= Vermont Route 110 =

North-south state highway in Vermont, US

Vermont Route 110
- Map of eastern Vermont with VT 110 highlighted in red

Route information
- Maintained by VTrans
- Length: 27.136 mi (43.671 km)

Major junctions
- South end: VT 14 in Royalton
- North end: US 302 in Barre

Location
- Country: United States
- State: Vermont
- Counties: Windsor, Orange, Washington

Highway system
- State highways in Vermont
| ← VT 109 | → VT 111 |

Vermont Route 110 (VT 110) is a state highway in the U.S. state of Vermont. The highway runs 27.136 miles (43.671 km) from VT 14 in Royalton in northern Windsor County north to U.S. Route 302 (US 302) in the town of Barre in central Washington County. VT 110 follows the valley of the First Branch White River through the Orange County towns of Tunbridge and Chelsea, which contain multiple historic buildings and covered bridges. The highway also follows the Jail Branch River, a tributary of the Winooski River, through Washington and Orange.

== Route description ==
VT 110 begins at a four-way intersection with VT 14 next to the confluence of the White River and the First Branch White River in the town of Royalton. The south leg of the intersection is Chelsea Street, which crosses the White River into the village of South Royalton, which contains the South Royalton Historic District and the Vermont Law School. VT 110 heads north as a two-lane highway through the valley of the First Branch White River. The highway passes the Royalton Mill Complex before entering the Orange County town of Tunbridge. VT 110 crosses the First Branch twice and passes the South Tunbridge Methodist Episcopal Church, the Howe Covered Bridge, and the Cilley Covered Bridge south of the town center. In the town center, which is contained in the Tunbridge Village Historic District, the highway crosses the First Branch a third time and passes the Hayward and Kibby Mill and the Mill Covered Bridge. North of the village, VT 110 passes the Foundry Bridge, the Larkin Covered Bridge, and the Flint Covered Bridge and crosses Dickerman Brook.

VT 110 continues into the Orange County seat of Chelsea. The highway crosses Cram Brook and passes the Moxley Covered Bridge on its way to the town center. VT 110 crosses the First Branch White River at the south end of the Chelsea Village Historic District and crosses Jail Brook and meets the western end of VT 113 in the center of town. The highway crosses the First Branch twice more before entering the town of Washington. VT 114 crosses several headwaters streams of the First Branch, then the route ascends from the stream valley to the village of Washington Heights. The highway descends into the valley of and has the first crossing of the Jail Branch River at the village of Washington. VT 110 passes through the southwest corner of the town of Orange then enters the Washington county town of Barre, where the highway is named Washington Road. The highway passes the East Barre Dam as it enters the village of East Barre. At Waterman Street, which leads to the historic Nichols House, VT 110 turns northeast, crosses the Jail Branch River in the village center, and reaches its northern terminus at a roundabout junction with US 302 (East Barre Road).

== Major intersections ==
| County | Location | mi | km | Destinations | Notes |
|---|---|---|---|---|---|
| Windsor | Royalton | 0.000 | 0.000 | VT 14 – Sharon, Bethel | Southern terminus |
| Orange | Chelsea | 13.197 | 21.239 | VT 113 east – Vershire, Thetford | Western terminus of VT 113 |
| Washington | Town of Barre | 27.136 | 43.671 | US 302 (East Barre Road) – Barre, Montpelier, Orange, Wells River | Northern terminus |
1.000 mi = 1.609 km; 1.000 km = 0.621 mi

== See also ==
- List of state highways in Vermont
