= Tunbridge Village Historic District =

Historic district in Vermont, United States

- U.S. National Register of Historic Places
- U.S. Historic district
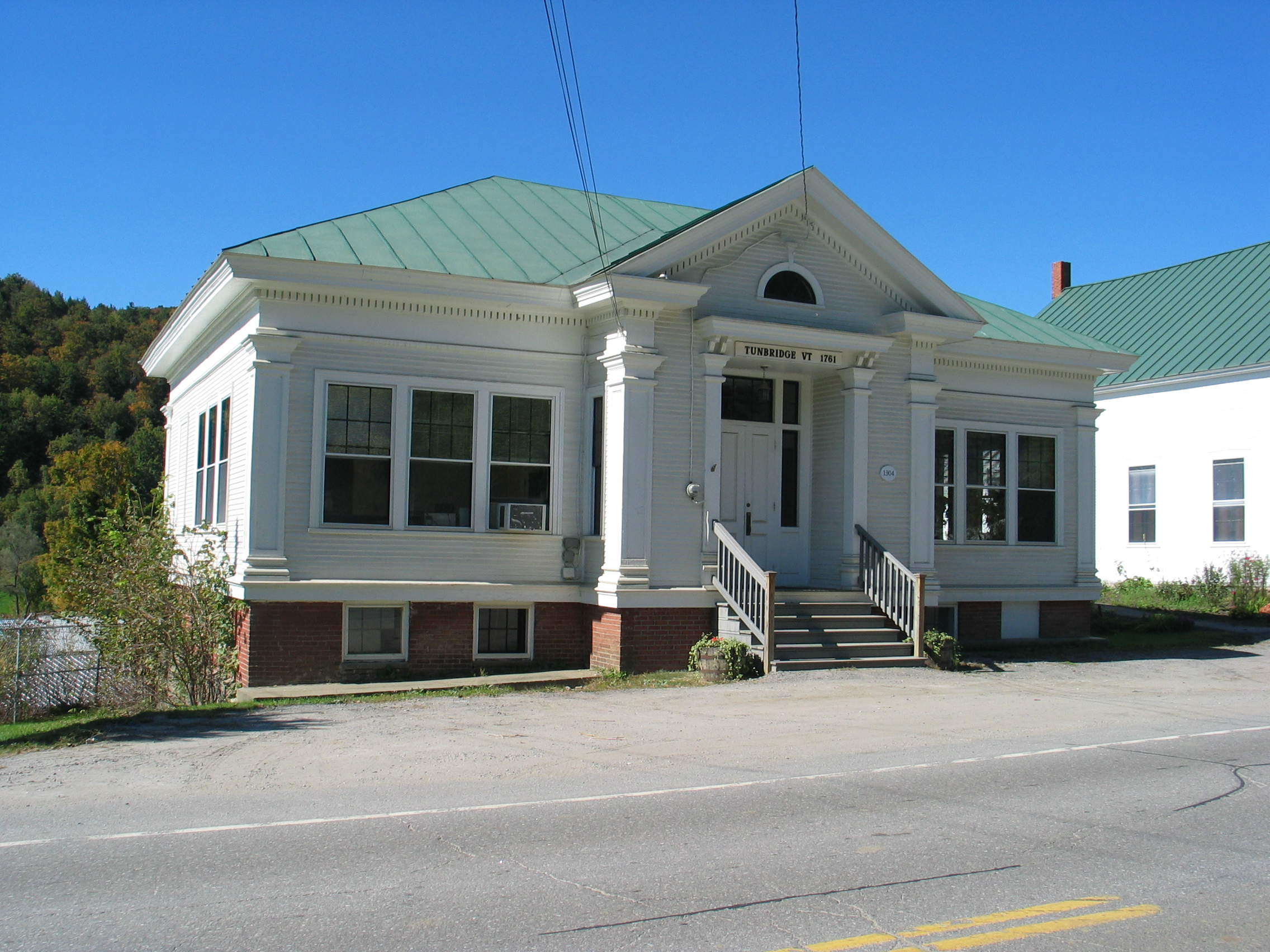

- Location within Vermont Location within the United States
- Location: Roughly, along VT 110 and adjacent rds. including Town Rd. 45 and Spring and Stafford Rds., Tunbridge, Vermont
- Coordinates: 43°53′15″N 72°29′42″W
- Area: 115 acres (47 ha)
- Built: 1800
- Architectural style: Gothic Revival, Greek Revival, Federal
- NRHP reference No.: 94000635
- Added to NRHP: June 24, 1994

The Tunbridge Village Historic District encompasses the early 19th-century village center of Tunbridge, Vermont. Stretched linearly along Vermont Route 110, the largely agricultural village reached its peak population around 1820, and was bypassed by the railroads, limiting later development. It was listed on the National Register of Historic Places in 1994.

== Description and history ==
The main village of Tunbridge (chartered 1761) was settled in the 1780s, beginning with the construction of a sawmill and gristmill on the banks of the First Branch White River in 1785. With the village adjacent to fertile bottomlands along the river, it developed as an agricultural center, and a brickyard was opened in 1820, providing building materials for several local buildings. The village was bypassed during the construction of railroads during the 19th century, but was able to maintain an agricultural economy due to its relative proximity to the station in nearby Royalton. In 1847, the village inaugurated the Tunbridge World's Fair, which has been held at fairgrounds in the village since 1875. The result of this economic history is a collection of buildings, most of which were built before 1840.

The historic district, which covers most of the village, extends mainly along Vermont 110, the principal artery along the First Branch White River. Its southern boundary is Howe Lane (Town Highway 45), and its northern boundary is beyond Spring Road. It includes properties along a number of side streets, including Strafford Road and Spring Street. The latter is where the Hayward and Kibby Mill and the Mill Covered Bridge are located. Most of the buildings are modest wood-frame houses, in either Federal or Greek Revival styles, although there are few houses with later Gothic and Italianate features, and a few are built of brick. The village is also home to a number of municipal buildings, as well as several churches. The fairgrounds are located on the west side of Vermont 110, where a bend in the river is not matched by the roadway. The fairground retains a number of well-preserved 19th-century buildings.

== See also ==
- National Register of Historic Places listings in Orange County, Vermont
