= South Tunbridge Methodist Episcopal Church =

Historic church in Vermont, United States

- U.S. National Register of Historic Places
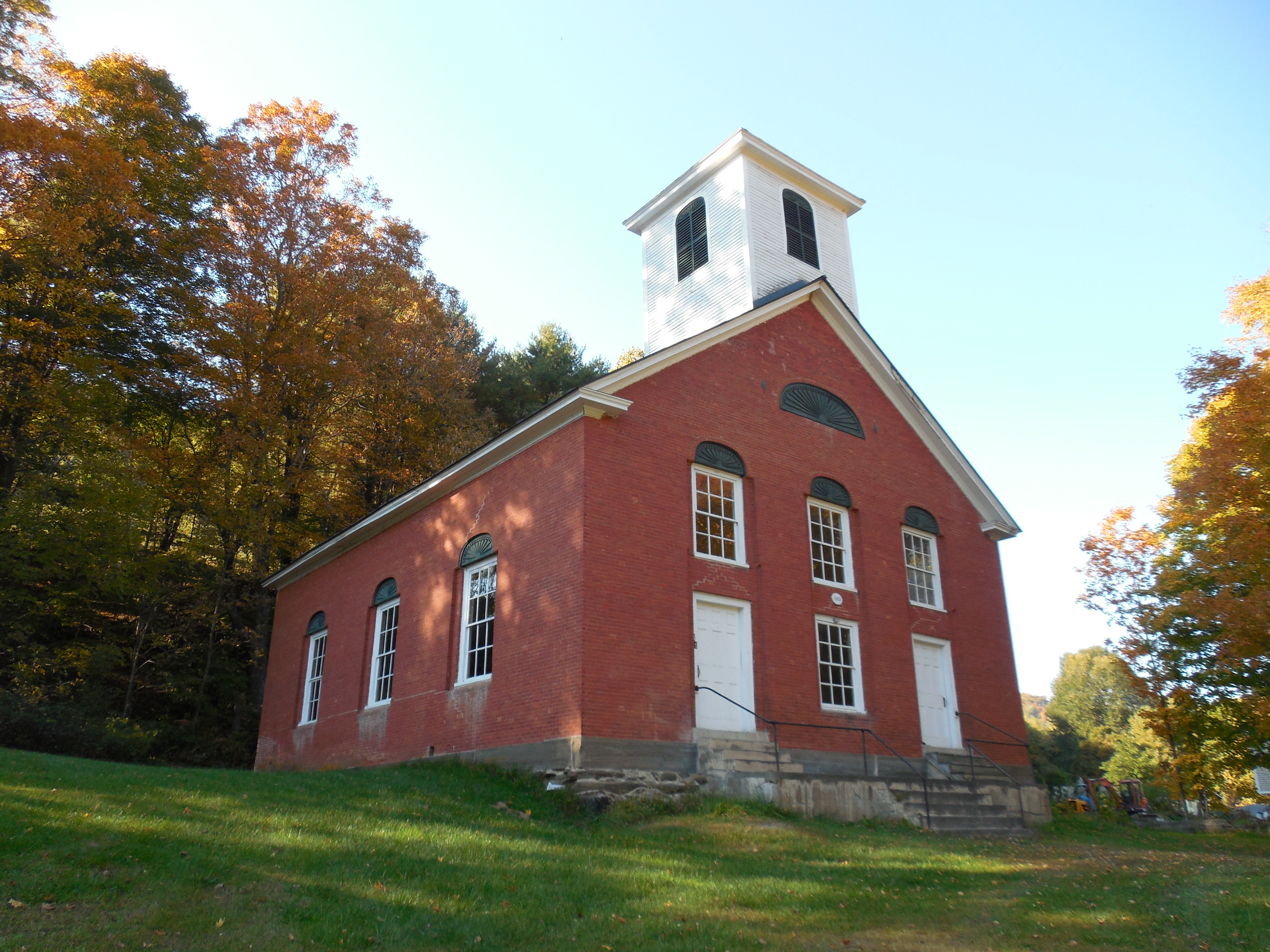
- South Tunbridge Methodist Episcopal Church

- Location within Vermont Location within the United States
- Location: VT 110, 1/3 mi. N of Royalton town line, Tunbridge, Vermont
- Coordinates: 43°51′24″N 72°30′7″W
- Area: 2 acres (0.81 ha)
- Built: 1833
- Architect: Hutchinson, William; Colburn, E.
- Architectural style: Federal
- MPS: Religious Buildings, Sites and Structures in Vermont MPS
- NRHP reference No.: 01000215
- Added to NRHP: March 2, 2001

The South Tunbridge Methodist Episcopal Church is a historic church on Vermont Route 110, about one-third of a mile north of the Royalton town line in Tunbridge, Vermont. Built in 1833, it is one of the finest examples of late Federal period architecture in Orange County, and was a mainstay of social and civic life in southern Tunbridge for many years. It was listed on the National Register of Historic Places in 2001.

== Description and history ==
The South Tunbridge Methodist Episcopal Church stands facing east on the west side of Vermont 110, on a rise overlooking the road and the adjacent First Branch White River. It is one of two public buildings in what is now a rural cluster of residences; to its south stands a 1920s community hall. The church is a single-story brick structure, with a gabled roof and stone foundation. The roof is topped by a single-stage clapboarded square tower, which is topped by a corniced flat roof, and has arched louvered openings for the belfry. The main facade is three bays wide and symmetrically arranged, with entrances flanking a central sash window on the ground floor, and three windows above. The second-level windows are set in recesses and topped by distinctive recessed sunburst-patterned brickwork. The sills of these windows are formed out of ogee-shaped bricks. The windows on the side walls have the same features. The interior of the church has a vestibule area topped by a now-enclosed gallery, with the main hall featuring a pressed tin roof and raised pulpit at the western end.

Prior to the construction of this church, area Methodists met in a house known then as the "old parsonage", a short way to the north. This structure was built in 1833 by William Hutchinson and E. Colburn. Its brickwork and distinctive sunburst decorations set it apart from other Federal period buildings in the area. For much of the 19th century, South Tunbridge was a thriving community, with a district school, post office, saw and grist mills, and blacksmithy. The church was a center of the local social life, hosting dinners and other social events for many years.

== See also ==
- National Register of Historic Places listings in Orange County, Vermont
