= Foundry Bridge =

- U.S. National Register of Historic Places
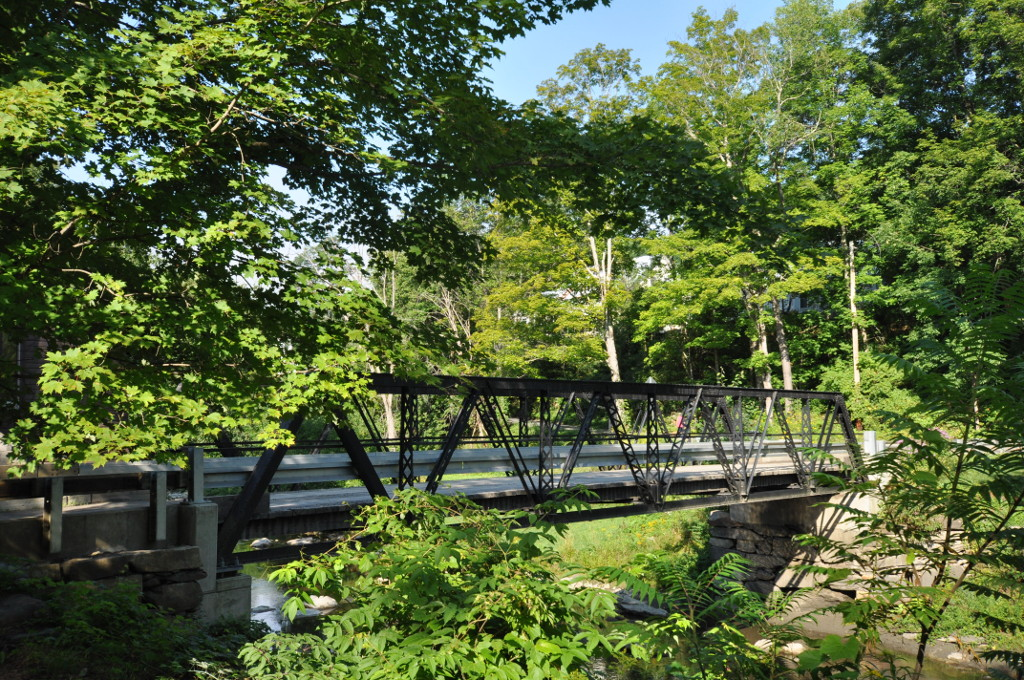

- Location within Vermont Location within the United States
- Location: Foundry Rd., just off VT 110, Tunbridge, Vermont
- Coordinates: 43°54′53″N 72°28′37″W
- Area: less than one acre
- Built: 1889
- Built by: Vermont Construction Co.
- Architectural style: Warren pony truss
- MPS: Metal Truss, Masonry, and Concrete Bridges in Vermont MPS
- NRHP reference No.: 07000692
- Added to NRHP: July 11, 2007

The Foundry Bridge is a historic Warren pony truss bridge, carrying Foundry Road across the First Branch White River in Tunbridge, Vermont. Built in 1889, it is one of the state's oldest wrought iron bridges, and the only surviving example in the state of work by the Vermont Construction Company, its only local manufacturer of such bridges. It was listed on the National Register of Historic Places in 2007.

== Description and history ==
The Foundry Bridge is located in the village of North Tunbridge, providing access across the First Branch White River to rural eastern parts of the town via Foundry Road. The bridge is a single-span Warren pony truss, set on abutments of dry laid stone. The bridge is trapezoidal in profile, its trusses 72 feet 6 inches (22.10 m) in length. The roadway width is 11 feet 6 inches (3.51 m), with a total structure width of 13 feet (4.0 m). Distinctive features of the trusses indicating its age include riveted joints (an advance over older pin connections) and posts between the truss panels. The bridge deck consists of timber stringers on a wrought iron frame, supporting a wooden bridge deck. The web of truss components reflects a means of fabrication that was obsolete at the time, but still in use by the builder, who had not yet adopted recent advances in steel rolling technology.

The bridge was built in 1889, its trusses fabricated by the Vermont Construction Company of St. Albans, which was the only Vermont business of the period to build wrought iron trusses. The bridge, built for the town at a cost of $876, provided access from the village of North Tunbridge to two of its major industries, Smith's Foundry (for which the road is named) and a gristmill. The Vermont Construction Company was in business from 1885 to 1901, when it was acquired by the American Bridge Company.

== See also ==
- National Register of Historic Places listings in Orange County, Vermont
- List of bridges on the National Register of Historic Places in Vermont
