= Flint Covered Bridge =

Covered bridge in Vermont

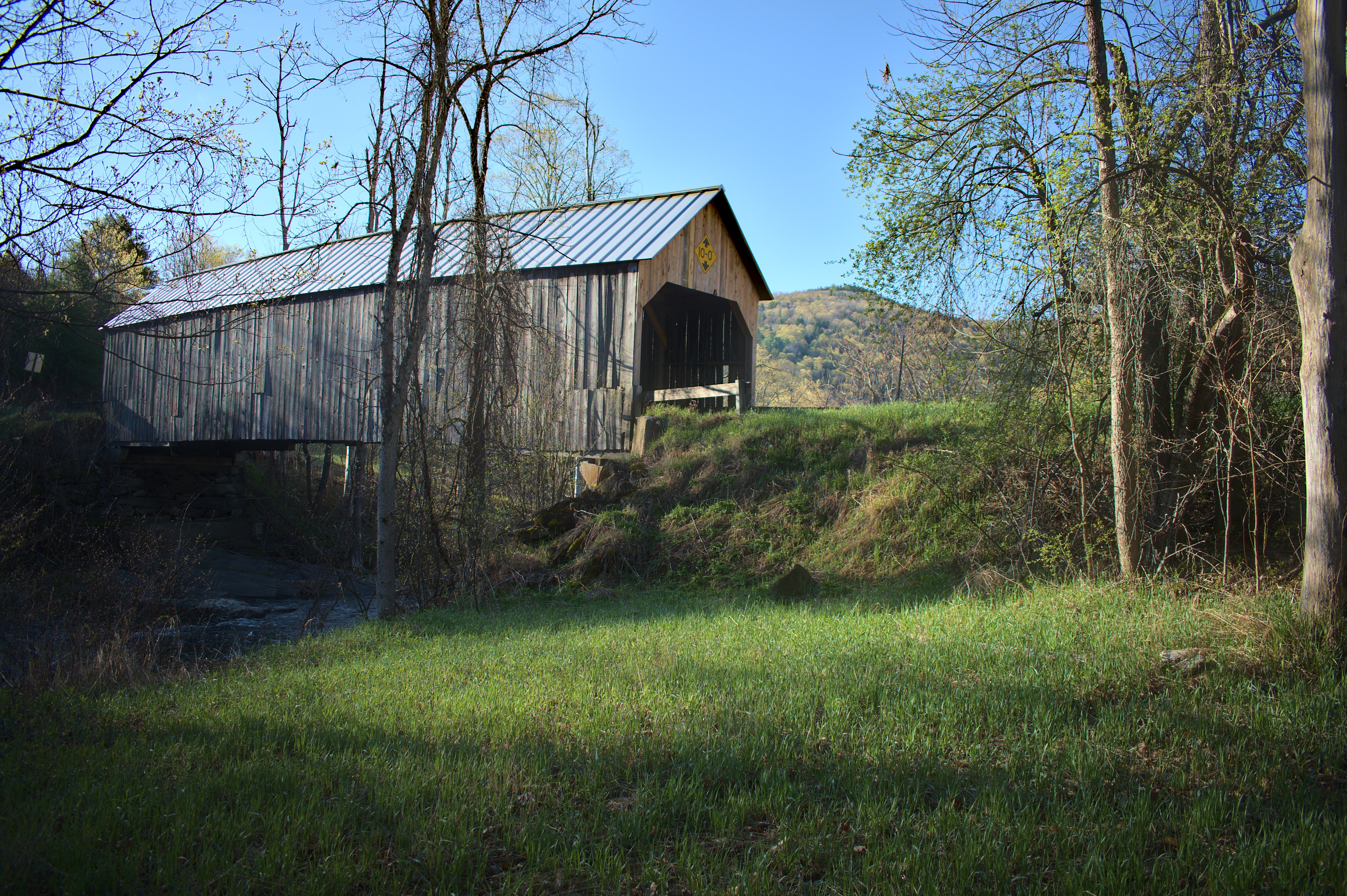
- Coordinates: 43°56′56″N 72°27′32″W
- Carries: Automobiles
- Locale: Tunbridge
- Flint Covered Bridge
- U.S. National Register of Historic Places
- Location within Vermont Location within the United States
- Location: Tunbridge, Vermont
- Coordinates: 43°56′56″N 72°27′31″W
- Area: 1 acre (0.40 ha)
- Built: 1845
- Architectural style: Queenpost truss
- NRHP reference No.: 74000239
- Added to NRHP: September 10, 1974

Characteristics
- Design: Queenpost Truss Bridge
- Material: Wood

History
- Construction end: 1845

Location
- Interactive map of Flint Covered Bridge

The Flint Covered Bridge is a historic covered bridge carrying Bicknell Hill Road over the First Branch White River in northern Tunbridge, Vermont. Built in 1845, it is the oldest of five 19th-century covered bridges in Tunbridge, representing one of the highest concentrations of covered bridges in the state. It was listed on the National Register of Historic Places on September 10, 1974.

== Description and history ==
The Flint Covered Bridge is located in far northern Tunbridge, just south of the town line with Chelsea, carrying Bicknell Hill Road over the First Branch White River just east of Vermont Route 110. It is a single-span Queenpost truss bridge, 87 feet (27 m) long, set on stone abutments that have been faced in concrete. It is 17.5 feet (5.3 m) wide, with a roadway width of 15 feet (4.6 m) (one lane). The trusses have been strengthened by iron rods descending from the diagonals, and laminated stringers have been added below the deck, with steel cables criss-crossed between the deck members to increase lateral stability. The sides and portal ends are finished in vertical board siding, and the bridge is covered by a gabled metal roof.

The bridge was built in 1845, and is the oldest of Tunbridge's five bridges. It was given an extensive renovation in 1969, in which its exterior siding was replaced in a sympathetic manner to its original finish. Along with a bridge in Chelsea, the bridges in Tunbridge, each spanning the same river in a 7-mile (11 km) stretch, represent one of the highest concentrations of historic covered bridges in the state.

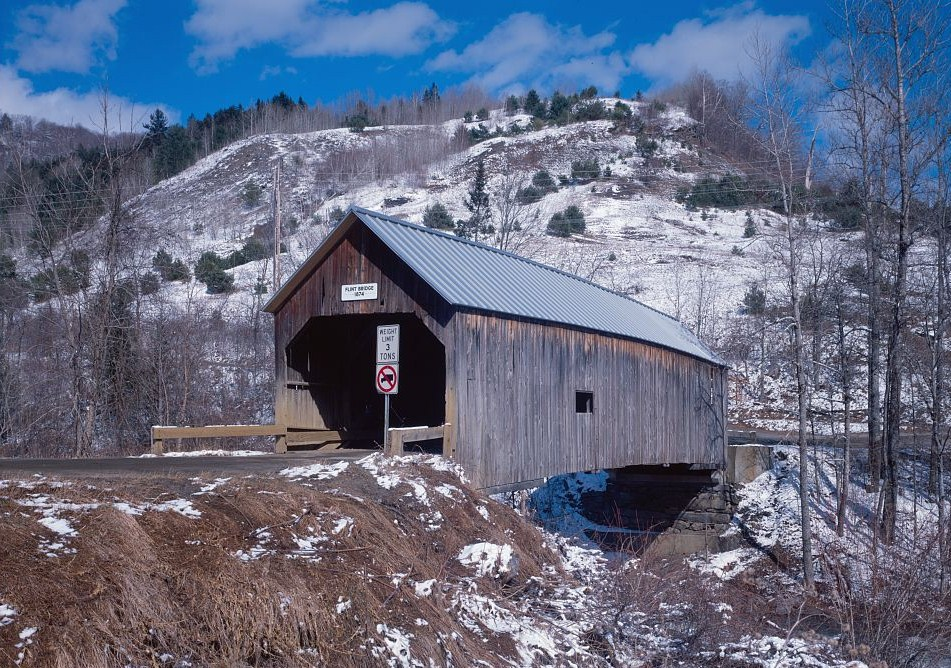

== See also ==
- List of Vermont covered bridges
- List of bridges documented by the Historic American Engineering Record in Vermont
- List of bridges on the National Register of Historic Places in Vermont
- National Register of Historic Places listings in Orange County, Vermont
