= Royalton Mill Complex =

Historic house in Vermont, United States

- U.S. National Register of Historic Places
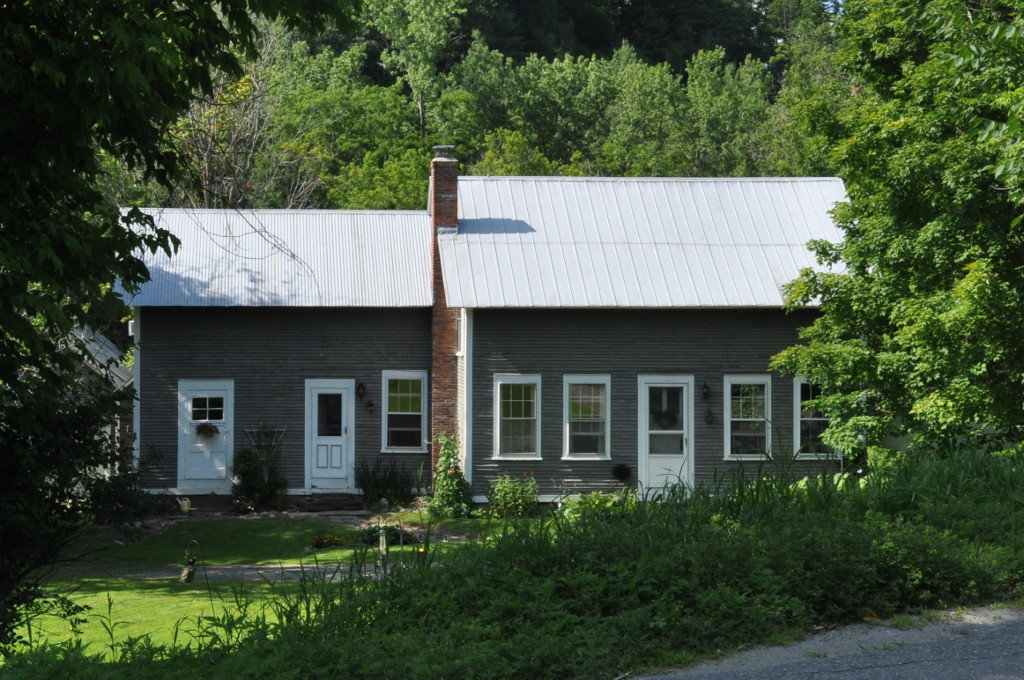
- The duplex

- Location within Vermont Location within the United States
- Location: South Royalton, Vermont
- Coordinates: 43°49′54″N 72°30′56″W
- Area: 1 acre (0.40 ha)
- Built: 1875
- Architectural style: Cape Cod Plan
- NRHP reference No.: 83003232
- Added to NRHP: February 3, 1983

The Royalton Mill Complex is a three-building residential site in what is now a rural setting of Royalton, Vermont. The two houses and barn are historically associated with a mill, whose breached dams and remnant foundations lie just to the north. One of the houses, built about 1780, is believed to be Royalton's oldest surviving building. The complex was listed on the National Register of Historic Places in 1983.

== Description and history ==
The Royalton Mill Complex lies along the eastern bank of the First Branch White River, about 0.5 miles (0.80 km) north of the village of South Royalton. It is set near a broad bend in the river, and is bounded on the east by Mill Road (Town Road 12). Set nearest the road is a 2 1/2-story wood frame duplex, which was built about 1840 as mill worker housing. West of this is a modest single-story Cape style house, with a five-bay facade and central chimney. This house was built in 1780–81, and probably includes lumber salvaged from mill and residential structures destroyed during the 1780 Royalton raid. South of the house stands a c. 1880 barn, built as part of the mill complex for storage. To the north of the house lie the remnants of the last mill buildings to stand on the site, with now-breached dams spanning the river.

This site on the First Branch White River was first developed industrially about 1776, probably by Isaac Morgan. Morgan rebuilt the mill and house after the 1780 raid, and the site had 190 years of industrial history. In the 19th century, the site included a sawmill, gristmill, fulling mill, nailery, and furniture factory. The surviving millhouse is one of only two 18th-century Cape houses in the town with an intact central chimney, and is believed to be the town's oldest building.

== See also ==
- National Register of Historic Places listings in Windsor County, Vermont
