= NGC 124 =

Spiral galaxy in the constellation Cetus

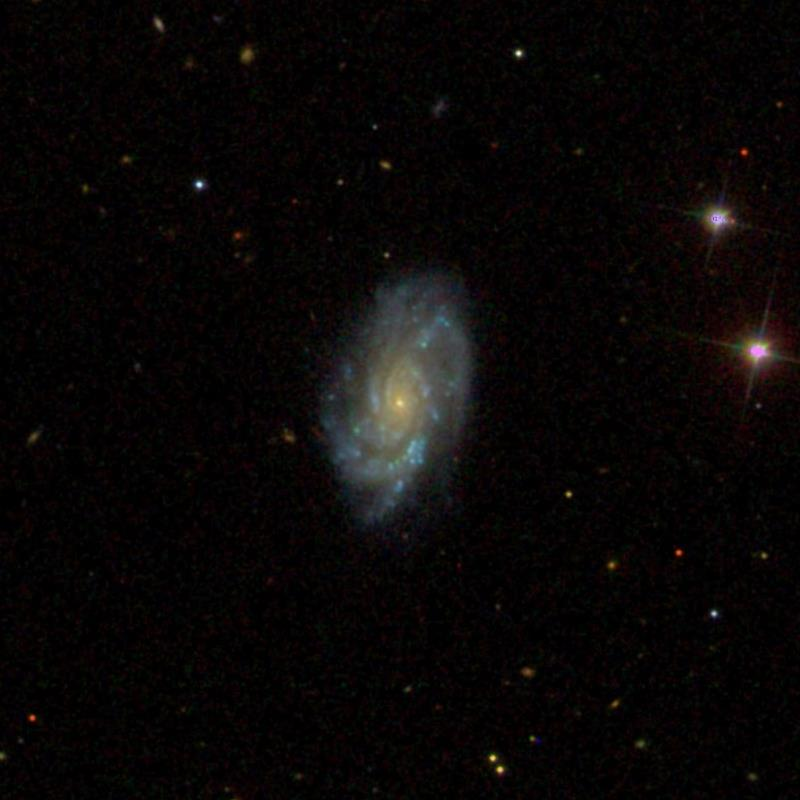
- NGC 124 as seen by SDSS

Observation data (J2000 epoch)
- Constellation: Cetus
- Right ascension: 00^{h} 27^{m} 52.363^{s}
- Declination: −01° 48′ 36.49″
- Redshift: 0.013543
- Heliocentric radial velocity: 4060
- Distance: 181.02 ± 25.22 Mly (55.500 ± 7.731 Mpc)
- Apparent magnitude (B): 13.9

Characteristics
- Type: SA(s)c
- Size: 84,200 ly (25,830 pc)
- Apparent size (V): 1.4′ × 0.9′

Other designations
- UGC 271, MGC+00-02-038, PGC 1715

NGC 124 is a spiral galaxy in the constellation Cetus. It was discovered by Truman Henry Safford on September 23, 1867. The galaxy was described as "very faint, large, diffuse, 2 faint stars to northwest" by John Louis Emil Dreyer, the compiler of the New General Catalogue.

The 17th magnitude supernova SN 2004dd was discovered in this galaxy on 12 July 2004. It was a type II supernova.
