= NGC 114 =

Galaxy in the constellation Cetus

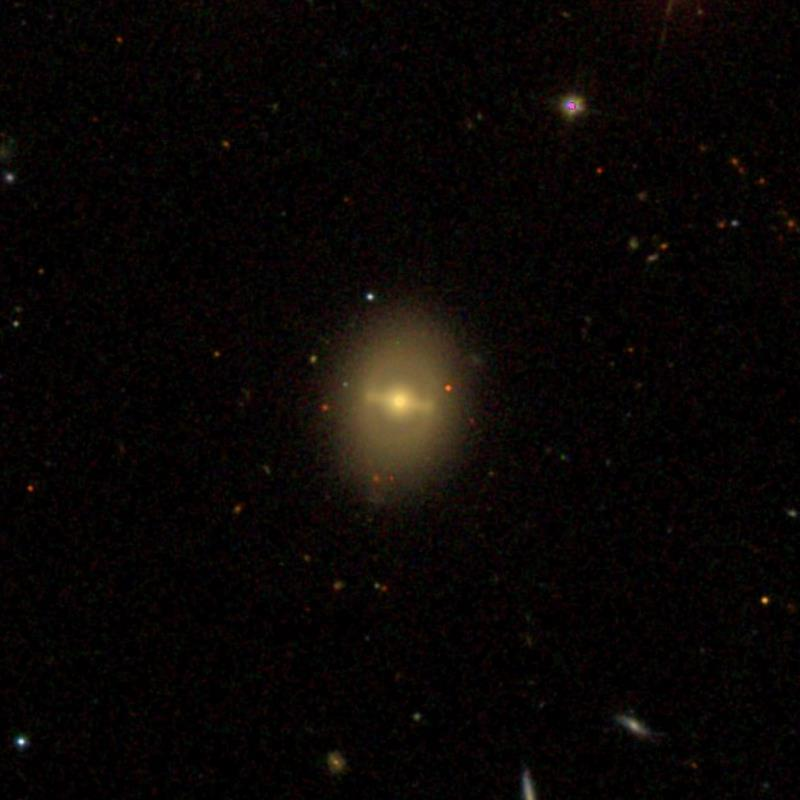
- SDSS view of NGC 114

Observation data (J2000 epoch)
- Constellation: Cetus
- Right ascension: 00^{h} 26^{m} 58.22113^{s}
- Declination: −01° 47′ 10.3429″
- Redshift: 0.013873
- Heliocentric radial velocity: 4159 km/s
- Distance: 195 Mly

Characteristics
- Type: SB0(rs)?
- Size: 55,000 ly

Other designations
- UGC 259, LEDA 1660, MCG +00-02-027, Mrk 946

NGC 114 is a barred lenticular galaxy located in the constellation Cetus. It was discovered by American astronomer Truman Henry Safford on September 23, 1867. The galaxy lies approximately 195 million light-years from Earth, and is about 55,000 light-years in diameter, nearly half the size of the Milky Way.
