= Moxley Covered Bridge =

- U.S. National Register of Historic Places
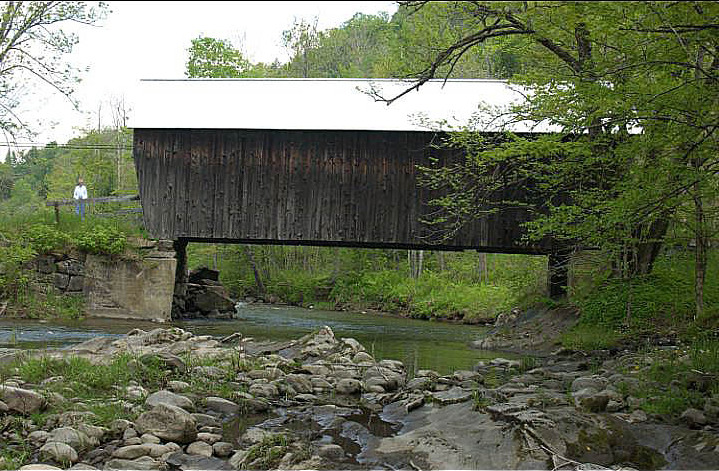

- Location within Vermont Location within the United States
- Location: Moxley Rd. across the First Branch White River, Chelsea, Vermont
- Coordinates: 43°57′25″N 72°27′49″W
- Area: 1 acre (0.40 ha)
- Built: 1886
- NRHP reference No.: 74000244
- Added to NRHP: September 10, 1974

The Moxley Covered Bridge is a historic covered bridge carrying Moxley Road across the First Branch White River in southern Chelsea, Vermont. Built in 1886-87, it is the town's only surviving 19th-century covered bridge. It was listed on the National Register of Historic Places in 1974.

== Description and history ==
The Moxley Covered Bridge stands in southern Chelsea, about 2.5 miles (4.0 km) south of the village center, on Moxley Road a short way east of Vermont Route 110. It is a single span multiple kingpost truss structure, resting on abutments of dry laid stone and concrete facing. The southern abutment is set on a prominent rock outcrop. The bridge is covered by a metal roof, and its exterior is finished in vertical board siding, which extends a short way to the interior of the portals. The trusses include wrought iron rods, and are set at an offset to one another, giving the bridge the shape of a parallelogram. A laminated beam has been bolted to the underside of the floor planking to provide additional strength. The bridge is 57 feet (17 m) long and 17 feet (5.2 m) wide, with a roadway width of 15 feet (4.6 m) (one lane).

The bridge was built c. 1886-87. It is Chelsea's only 19th-century covered bridge, and is one of a concentrated group (most in neighboring Tunbridge) of such bridges in the state.

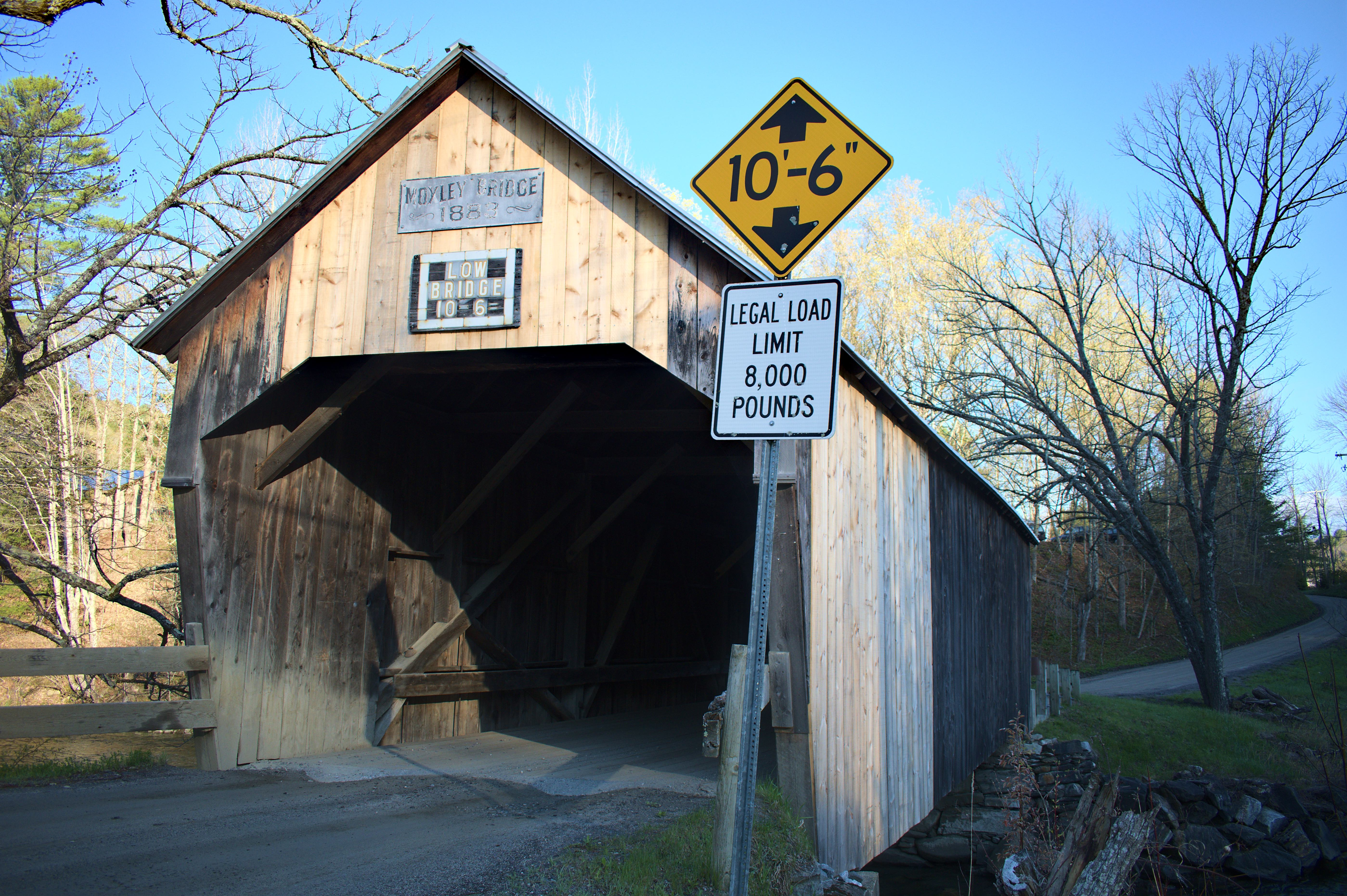

== See also ==
- National Register of Historic Places listings in Orange County, Vermont
- List of covered bridges in Vermont
- List of bridges on the National Register of Historic Places in Vermont
