= Joseph Smith Birthplace Memorial =

Memorial in Vermont, US

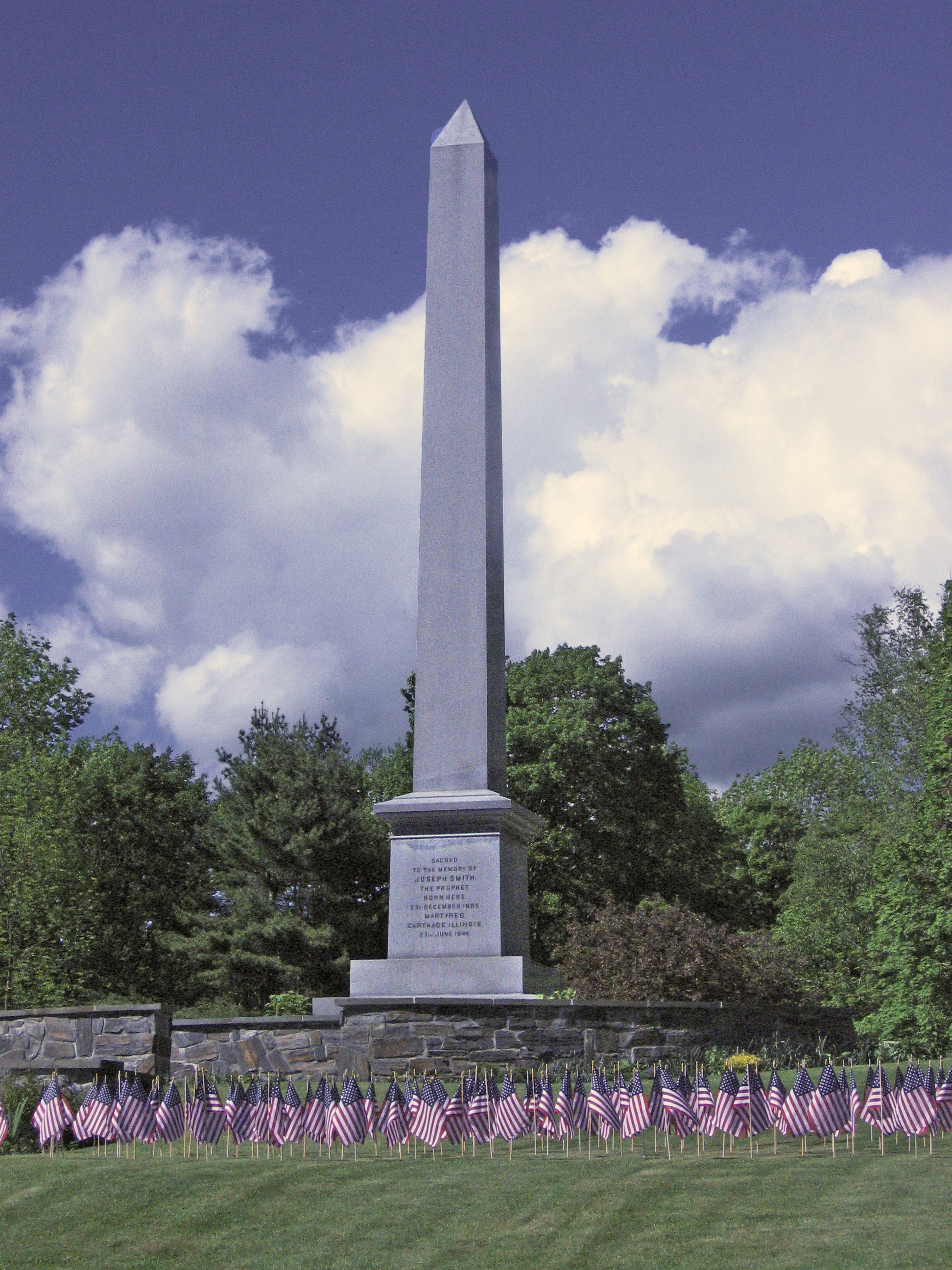
- The obelisk in May 2009
- Interactive map of Joseph Smith Birthplace Memorial
- 43°49′26″N 72°28′21″W
- Location: White River Valley, Sharon, Vermont, United States

History
- Dedication: December 23, 1905

Site notes
- Governing body: The Church of Jesus Christ of Latter-day Saints

The Joseph Smith Birthplace Memorial is a granite obelisk on a hill in the White River Valley near Sharon and South Royalton in the U.S. state of Vermont. It marks the spot where Joseph Smith was born on December 23, 1805. The monument was erected by the Church of Jesus Christ of Latter-day Saints (LDS Church), which recognizes Smith as its first president and founding prophet. The LDS Church continues to own and operate the site as a tourist attraction.

== History ==
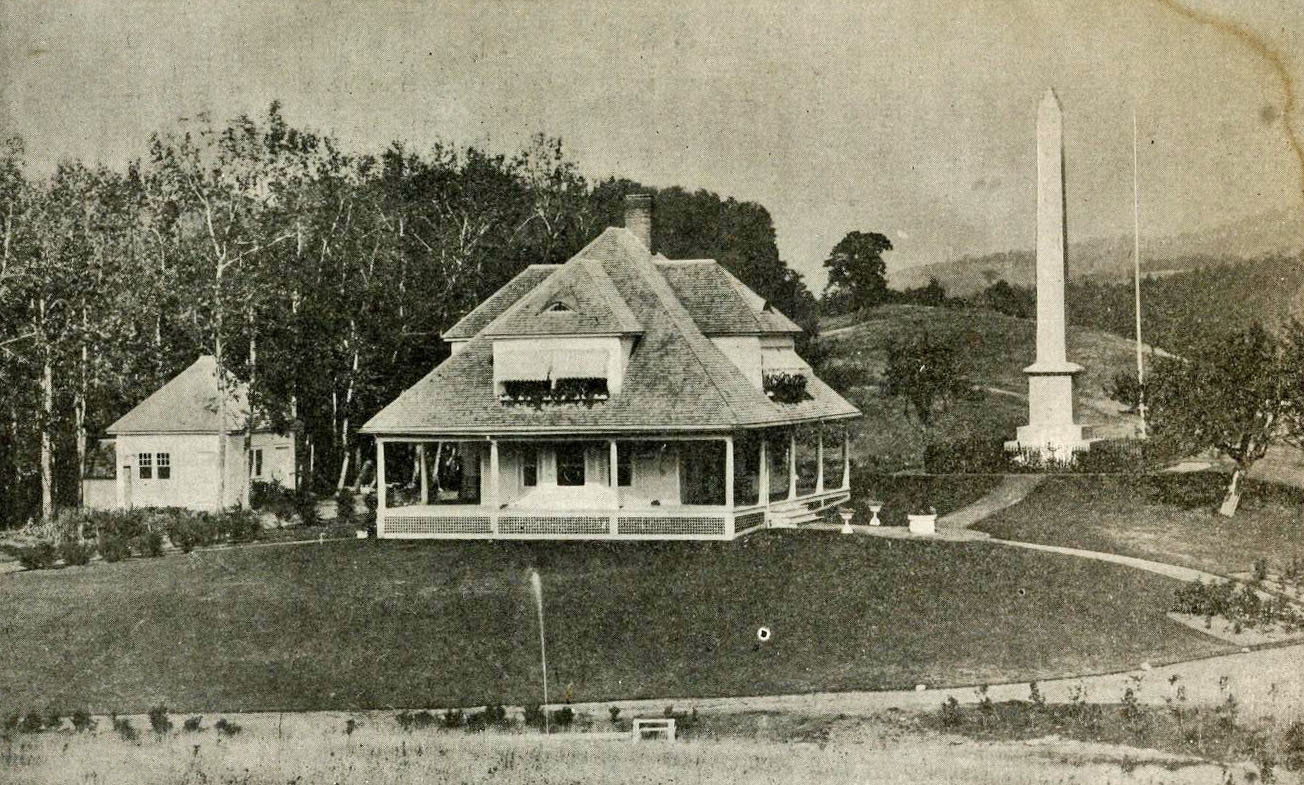
The "monument and the memorial cottage" depicted in 1907.

In 1884, LDS Church leader Junius F. Wells visited Smith's birthplace and conceived a plan to build a monument to him. Under the direction of church president Joseph F. Smith, Wells oversaw the construction of the monument and cottage house in 1905. The Joseph Smith Birthplace Memorial was dedicated by Joseph F. Smith on the 100th anniversary of Joseph Smith's birth, on December 23, 1905.

By 1907, Wells reported that there had been between seven and eight thousand visitors.

== Description ==
The monument stands 50 feet (15 m) tall and weighs approximately 100 short tons (91 t). The 40-short-ton (36 t) shaft of the obelisk is 38.5 feet (11.7 m) long: one for each year of Smith's life. The obelisk was quarried in Barre, Vermont, and it has been cited as a "remarkable engineering feat" and "one of the largest polished shafts in the world".

An LDS Church visitors' center and meetinghouse are on the same property as the memorial. Admission to the visitors' center and tours of the memorial site are free.
