= Howe Covered Bridge =

- U.S. National Register of Historic Places
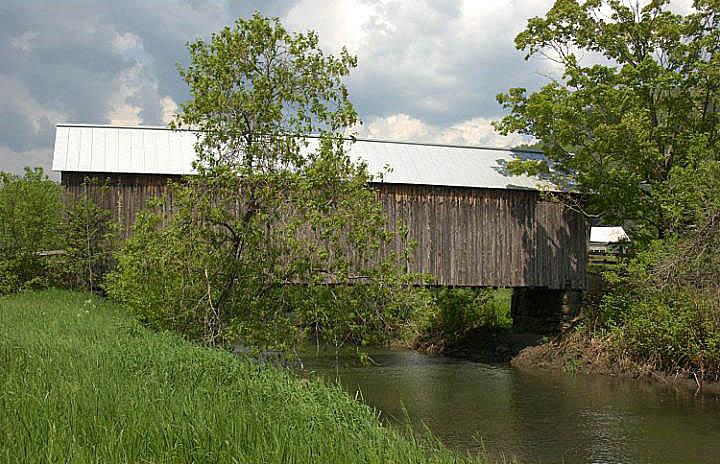

- Location within Vermont Location within the United States
- Location: Belknap Brook Rd., across the First Branch White River, Tunbridge, Vermont
- Coordinates: 43°51′53″N 72°29′58″W
- Area: 1 acre (0.40 ha)
- Built: 1879
- Architectural style: multiple Kingpost truss
- NRHP reference No.: 74000241
- Added to NRHP: September 10, 1974

The Howe Covered Bridge is a historic covered bridge carrying Belknap Brook Road across the White River in Tunbridge, Vermont, just east of Vermont Route 110. Built in 1879, it is one of five surviving bridges in the town, one of the highest concentrations of covered bridges in the state. It was listed on the National Register of Historic Places in 1974.

== Description and history ==
The Howe Covered Bridge is located in southern Tunbridge, just east of Vermont 110 on Belknap Brook Road. It is a single-span multiple Kingpost truss structure, 75 feet (23 m), resting on dry laid stone abutments. It has a roadway width of 13 feet (4.0 m) (one lane) and a total width of 15.5 feet (4.7 m). The abutments are extended upriver by concrete wingwalls. The trusses are formed of timbers bolted together, with vertical iron rods providing additional stability. The exterior is finished in vertical board siding, and is topped by a gabled metal roof. The portal ends are also finished in vertical board siding, which extends partway along the inside to shelter the truss ends.

The bridge was built about 1879; its builder is unknown. It is one of five surviving bridges in Tunbridge, which, along with another in nearby Chelsea, form a remarkable concentration of 19th-century covered bridges in the state.

== See also ==
- National Register of Historic Places listings in Orange County, Vermont
- List of Vermont covered bridges
- List of bridges on the National Register of Historic Places in Vermont
