= Sarah E. Buxton =

American lawyer and politician

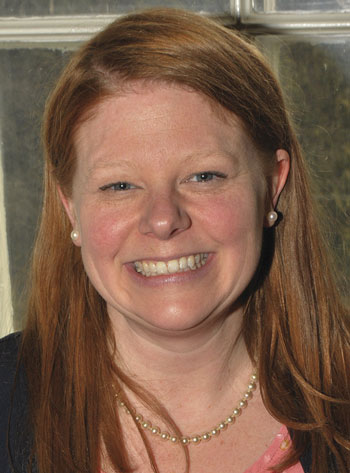

Director of the Workforce Development Division, Vermont Department of Labor
- Incumbent
- Assumed office April 2019
- Appointed by: Lindsay Kurrle
- Preceded by: David Lahr

Director of Workforce Policy and Performance, Vermont Department of Labor
- In office November 2017 – April 2019
- Appointed by: Phil Scott

Member of the Vermont House of Representatives from the Windsor-Orange-1 district
- In office January 2011 – January 2017
- Preceded by: David M. Ainsworth
- Succeeded by: David M. Ainsworth

Personal details
- Born: September 7, 1978 (age 47) Orwell, Vermont, U.S.
- Party: Democratic
- Education: University of Vermont (BA); Vermont Law School (JD)

Sarah E. Buxton (born September 7, 1978) is an American lawyer and politician from Vermont. She was a member of the Vermont House of Representatives from Tunbridge.

== Biography ==
Sarah Buxton was born on September 7, 1978, in Orwell. She graduated from Fair Haven Union High School in 1996. She attended the University of Vermont, graduating in 2000 with a degree in Political Science. She worked in Howard Dean's office when he was Governor, and later worked on his 2004 campaign for President.

She later worked for the Children’s Defense Fund, managed the 2006 reelection campaign for United States Representative Marcy Kaptur, and worked on Kaptur's Congressional staff.

In 2007 Buxton returned to Vermont to attend Vermont Law School. She received her J.D. (cum laude) in 2010 and was President of her class.

In 2010 Buxton was a successful Democratic candidate for the Vermont House of Representatives, representing the district which includes the towns of Royalton and her hometown of Tunbridge, and she was elected to a second term in 2012.

As a member of the Vermont House of Representatives, Buxton served on the House Education Committee and was an advocate for issues related to women's rights, children, and education. She was the lead sponsor of Act 166, which provides publicly funded Pre-K education for Vermont's children, and co-sponsored Vermont's Equal Pay Act.

Buxton worked full-time at Vermont Law School as assistant director of community relations and alumni affairs until the summer of 2013. She is a member of the Vermont Bar Association, the Gifford Hospital Auxiliary, and the Tunbridge Church. She is a former member of the University of Vermont Board of Trustees, having resigned on February 20, 2014, citing concerns about a potential conflict of interest when the University of Vermont partnered with Vermont Law School.

Buxton ran unsuccessfully for reelection in 2016: she was defeated by her House predecessor, Republican David M. Ainsworth. In 2010, she defeated Ainsworth by one vote. In 2016, Ainsworth defeated Buxton by one vote, 1,004 to 1,003. Confirming the results took two recounts. After the first, Buxton and Ainsworth were tied at 1,000 votes each. After physical inspection of the ballots to determine voter intent, seven that had not been counted were determined to have clear voter intent, and were included in the totals. Four ballots were awarded to Ainsworth, and three to Buxton.

In March 2017, Buxton began work at the Vermont Department of Labor. In November 2017, Governor Phil Scott announced that Buxton would become the department's director of workforce policy and performance.

In April 2019 she became the director of the Workforce Development Division of the Vermont Department of Labor.
