= White River Valley =

Central Vermont, United States

Coordinates: 43.6484°N 72.3132°W

The White River Valley is a region in central Vermont, United States. The area is a natural river valley of the White River.

As defined by the valley's chamber of commerce, it includes eleven towns: Bethel, Braintree, Brookfield, Chelsea, Hancock, Randolph, Rochester, Royalton, Sharon, Stockbridge, and Tunbridge.

The White River Valley Consortium works to address regional issues in the area, among fourteen towns, also including Granville, Pittsfield, and Strafford.

The Herald, also known as the White River Valley Herald and The Herald of Randolph, has served sixteen towns in the White River Valley since 1874.

The area was once heavily farmed, though reforestation efforts by the Civilian Conservation Corps were especially evident in the region. The White River Valley is well known for its scenery, which is typically rugged and pastoral like much of Vermont east of the Green Mountains:

== See also ==
- White River Valley Railroad
