= Hayward and Kibby Mill =

- U.S. National Register of Historic Places
- U.S. Historic district
- U.S. Historic district – Contributing property
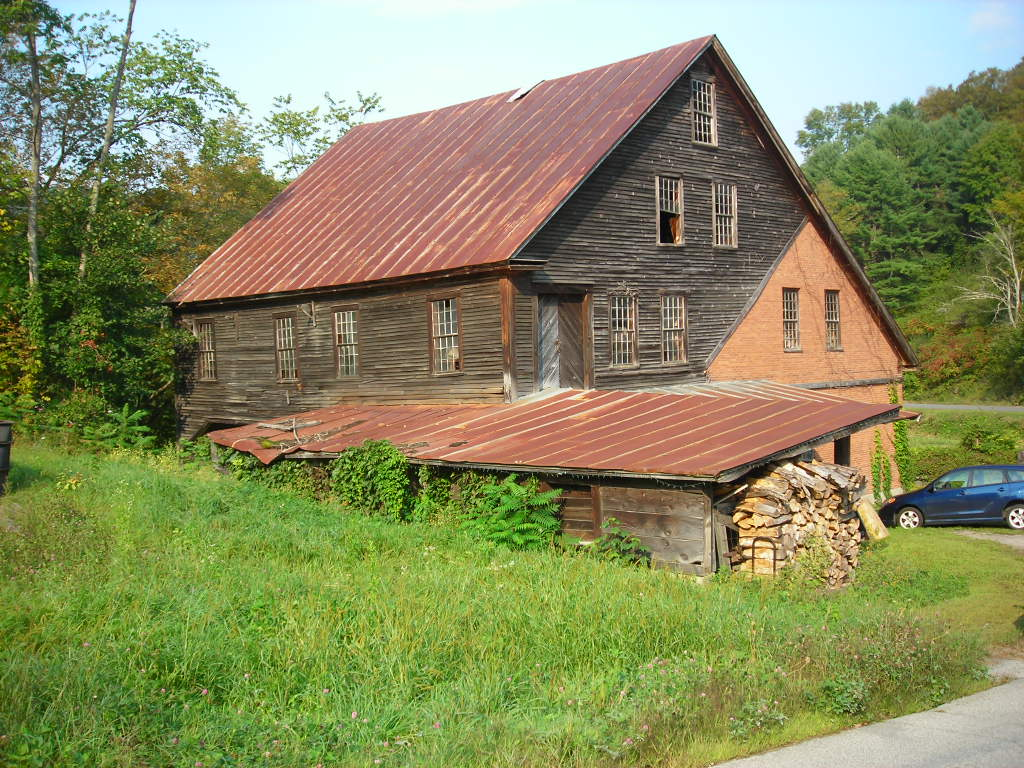
- The mill building

- Location within Vermont Location within the United States
- Location: Spring Rd. at First Branch White River, Tunbridge, Vermont
- Coordinates: 43°53′29″N 72°29′31″W
- Area: 1.3 acres (0.53 ha)
- Built: 1820
- Built by: Adams, A.C.
- Architectural style: Grist & saw mill
- Part of: Tunbridge Village Historic District (ID94000635)
- NRHP reference No.: 92000094

Significant dates
- Added to NRHP: March 12, 1992
- Designated CP: June 24, 1994

The Hayward and Kibby Mill, also known as the Tunbridge Mill, is a historic industrial facility on Spring Road in Tunbridge, Vermont. It includes a substantially complete water-powered 19th-century grist mill dating back to 1820, with a later sawmill added about 1870. It is one of the few surviving water-powered mills in the state, and is believed to be the only one featuring both a sawmill and grist (grain) mill. It was listed on the National Register of Historic Places in 1992.

== Description and history ==
The Hayward and Kibby Mill complex is located on the north side of Tunbridge village, occupying 1.3 acres (0.53 ha) on the south side of the First Branch White River. The complex includes a multi-component mill structure, a water power canal and dam, a former blacksmith shop, and the Mill Covered Bridge, which spans the river just below the dam and north of the surviving mill buildings. The mill building has as its core a 1 1/2-story brick structure, built about 1820 as a gristmill, to which a larger wood-frame sawmill was added about 1870. Across Spring Street from the mill is a 1 1/2-story brick building, built about 1803 as a blacksmith's shop, and since significantly altered to serve as a residence. That shop stands between the river and the stone-lined canal which provides water to the mill from the dam, a 1928 concrete replacement for the original dam, which was washed away by a flood in 1927. The mill interior includes operable 19th-century equipment, which can be powered by a turbine installed in the first half of the 20th century.

The mill stands on a site that has seen industrial activity since the 1780s, which was seen as advantageous due to the cascade created by a topographic constriction in the river flow at this point. The first mill was built by Elias Curtis, who also leased part of his water rights to Samuel Bement, who built the blacksmithy. Construction of the brick gristmill is of uncertain date: it fits stylistically into the period about 1820, but may have been built in the 1830s, when other village buildings were built using bricks from a nearby brickyard. The covered bridge was built in the 1880s, and was individually listed on the National Register in 1974.

== See also ==
- National Register of Historic Places listings in Orange County, Vermont
