= The Sharon Academy =

The Sharon Academy (TSA)

Location
- PO Box 207 Sharon, VT 05065; Sharon, Windsor, VT; United States; 43.78550°N 72.45370°W

Information
- School type: Independent
- Established: Established in 1994, opened later in 1996
- Headmaster: Mary Newman(as the Head of School) and Andrew Lane(as the Director of the Middle School)
- Grades: 7–12
- Enrollment: 140–170, 45(max enrollment for Middle School only)
- Color: Dark Green White
- Athletics conference: Central Vermont League Division IV
- Mascot: Phoenix
- Website: www.sharonacademy.org

The Sharon Academy (TSA) is a middle and high school both located in Sharon, Vermont, USA. Although, TSA is considered an independent school at the federal level, it still receives some payment from the state of Vermont and the town of Sharon.

== History ==
The Academy opened as a middle school with 12 students in one classroom of an old schoolhouse in September 1996. When students in the first class approached 8th grade graduation, and the prospect of transferring to high school, they expressed a desire to continue their education at TSA. The Vermont Department of Education approved the Academy's application to expand to include grades 9–12.

Enrollment numbers grew annually until the school reached its full capacity of 156 students. The Academy had outgrown the old schoolhouse, and construction began on a new facility on a hill overlooking the White River. The middle school continues to offer integrated studies at The Old Schoolhouse in Sharon, while the high school occupies the new facility, with a full size gym, a yurt village, an art room, a writing center, library, and science lab. The common area overlooks the river, surrounding valley, and mountains.

The Academy is a member of the Coalition of Essential Schools.

== School Events ==
Every year, the Middle School performs a circus with Troy Wunderle, a trained circus performer and ringmaster from Wunderle's Big Top Adventures. Before the performance, Wunderle teaches the students circus tricks that in some way contribute to the performance, regardless of circus theme, such as Juggling, Rola Bola, Unicycling, and Diabolos.

Additionally, there is yearly event called Chain Reaction Day where "The events and lectures for the day are inspired by Dr. Martin Luther King's legacy, and challenge us as a school community to examine our beliefs and our assumptions. Guest speakers are invited each year to talk about topics such as bullying, economic disparities within society, and racial tolerance."

== Athletics ==
Since 2006, TSA varsity soccer has gone to the state championship match five times. Twice (in the 2008 and 2009 seasons), their undefeated boys team lost in the championship game to Black River Academy; once 1–0, and once suffering a loss in a penalty shootout, respectively. In 2010 the Phoenix had a regular season record of 12–2. However, they were knocked out in a 4–3 game at the Vermont State semi-finals. In 2014 TSA went 14–0 in the regular season, claiming the number two seed in D-IV, but lost 2–0 to Twin Valley in the championship game.

In 2014-15 the boys basketball team had the best record in school history at 17–3 in the regular season. The Phoenix went to the finals. They lost to Proctor in overtime, 70-66.

The Sharon Academy athletics has also seen students go on to be Division I, II, and III NCAA athletes in women's basketball, women's soccer, men's basketball, men's soccer, and men's track and field.

The Sharon Academy has won CVL (Central Vermont League) championships in boys and girls basketball, and boys and girls soccer.
