= NGC 140 =

Spiral galaxy in the constellation Andromeda

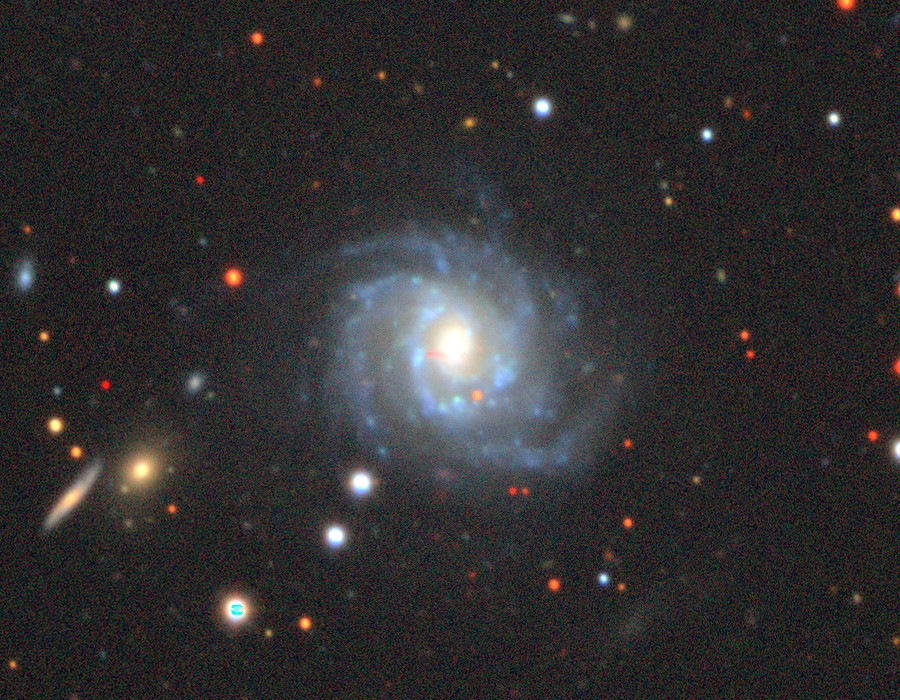
- NGC 140 imaged by Legacy Surveys

Observation data (J2000 epoch)
- Constellation: Andromeda
- Right ascension: 00^{h} 31^{m} 20.5^{s}
- Declination: +30° 47′ 33″
- Redshift: 0.021458
- Heliocentric radial velocity: 6433 km/s
- Apparent magnitude (V): 13.94

Characteristics
- Type: Scd
- Apparent size (V): 1.35' × 1.15'
- Notable features: "Very faint, small, round, gradually brighter middle."

Other designations
- UGC 311, PGC 1916

NGC 140 is a spiral galaxy in the constellation of Andromeda. It was discovered by Truman Henry Safford on October 8, 1866.

== Historical Information ==
Safford's discovery in 1866 was published in the appendix of an obscure paper. Sixteen years later, on November 5, 1882, Edouard Stephan discovered the same object, but was unaware of Safford's earlier discovery. Wolfgang Steinicke's version of the catalog lists Safford as the discoverer.

== Supernova ==
One supernova has been observed in NGC 140: SN 2025wug (Type IIb, mag. 16) was discovered by ATLAS on 2 September 2025.
