= Cilley Covered Bridge =

- U.S. National Register of Historic Places
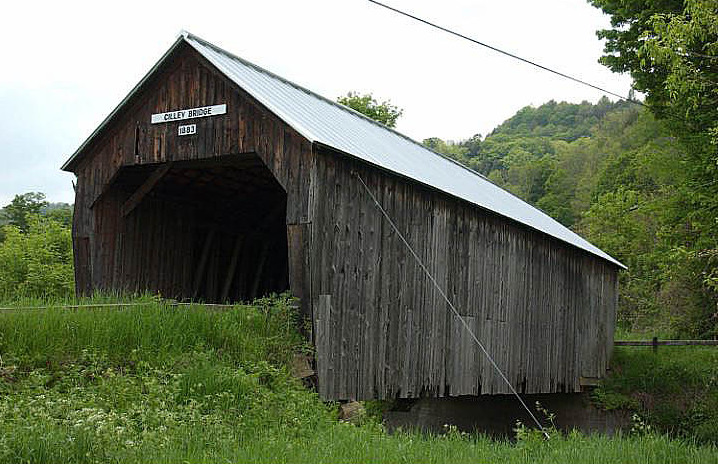

- Location within Vermont Location within the United States
- Location: Howe Ln across the First Branch White River, Tunbridge, Vermont
- Coordinates: 43°52′59″N 72°30′17″W
- Area: 1 acre (0.40 ha)
- Built: 1883
- Architectural style: multiple Kingpost truss
- NRHP reference No.: 74000238
- Added to NRHP: September 10, 1974

The Cilley Covered Bridge is a historic 19th-century covered bridge, carrying Howe Lane across the First Branch White River a short way south of the village of Tunbridge, Vermont. Built in 1883, it is a fine example of a king-post truss structure, and is one of the town's five 19th-century covered bridges. It was listed on the National Register of Historic Places in 1974.

== Description and history ==
The Cilley Covered Bridge stands in a rural area about 1 mile (1.6 km) south of the central village of Tunbridge. It carries Howe Lane, a side loop off Vermont Route 110, across the First Branch White River. It is a single-span king-post truss structure, 66 feet (20 m) long and 19 feet (5.8 m) wide, with a road bed 16 feet (4.9 m) wide (one lane). The bridge is set on abutments of stone, one of which has been faced in concrete, and is covered in vertical board siding and a metal roof. The south side of the bridge has two square window holes, which improve visibility due to a sharp turn in the road at one end. The trusses are set at a skew, giving the bridge the shape of a parallelogram. The portals are square, and the exterior sheathing extends around to the ends of the trusses on the interior.

The bridge was built in 1883, and has been little altered since then. It is one of six bridges in a 7-mile (11 km) stretch of the First Branch White River, representing one of the highest concentrations of covered bridges in the state.

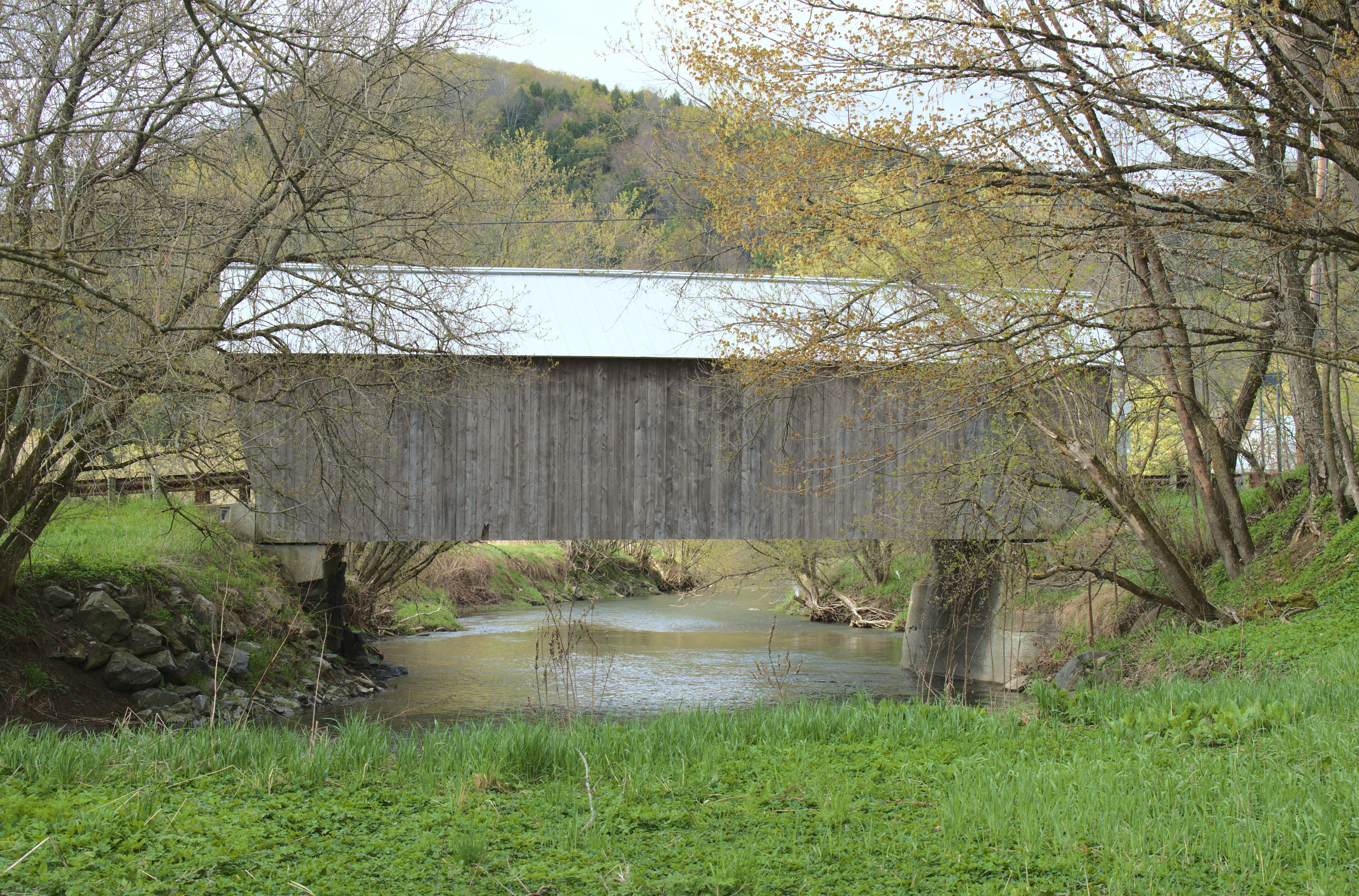

== See also ==
- List of Vermont covered bridges
- National Register of Historic Places listings in Orange County, Vermont
- List of bridges on the National Register of Historic Places in Vermont
