= NGC 118 =

Spiral galaxy in the constellation Cetus

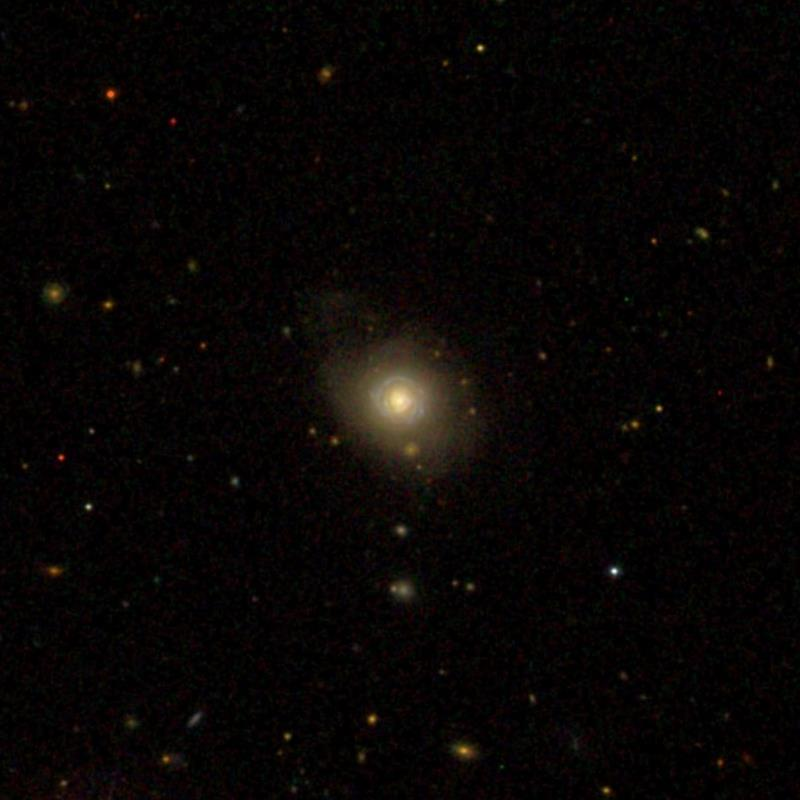
- SDSS image of NGC 118

Observation data (J2000 epoch)
- Constellation: Cetus
- Right ascension: 00^{h} 27^{m} 16.222^{s}
- Declination: −01° 46′ 48.50″
- Redshift: 0.037329
- Heliocentric radial velocity: 10982 km/s
- Distance: 524.5 ± 36.9 Mly (160.81 ± 11.30 Mpc)
- Apparent magnitude (V): 14.83
- Apparent magnitude (B): 14.63

Characteristics
- Type: S(rs)a? pec

Other designations
- UGC 264, MCG +00-02-032, Mrk 947, PGC 1678

NGC 118 is a spiral galaxy of type S(rs)a? pec with an apparent magnitude of 13.6 located in the constellation Cetus. It was discovered on September 23, 1867, by the astronomer Truman Safford.

== See also ==
- List of NGC objects
