= Royalton raid =

British-Indian military raid during the American War of Independence

- Part of the American Revolutionary War
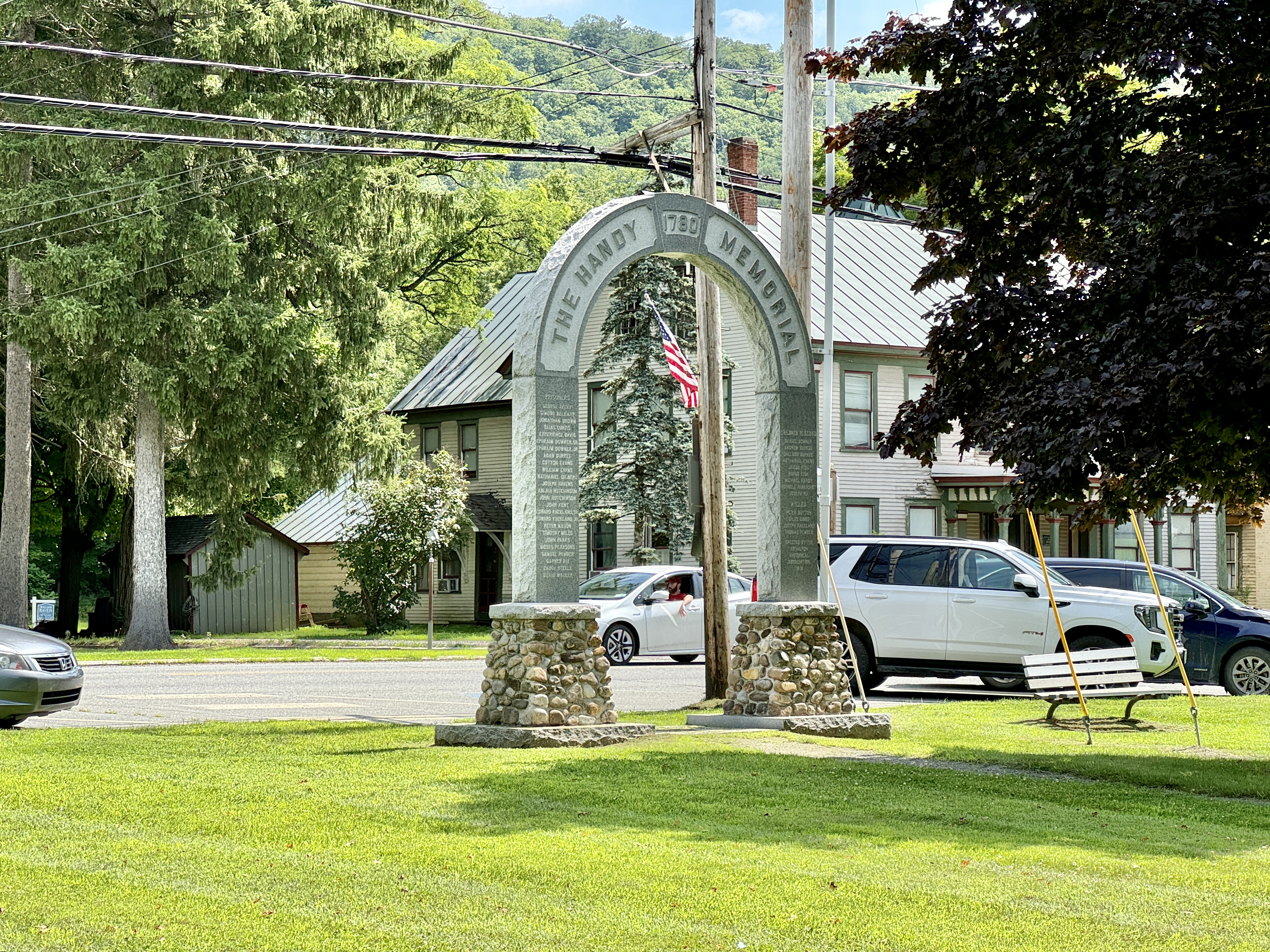
- The Hannah Handy Memorial in South Royalton commemorates the raid.
Date	October 16, 1780
Location	Vermont Republic
Result	British victory

Belligerents
Great Britain; Mohawks	Vermont Republic

Commanders and leaders
Lieutenant Richard Houghton	unknown

Strength
6 members of the 53rd Regiment of Foot; 1 grenadier 300 Kanien’kehá:ka (Mohawk Indians) warriors from Kahnawà:ke, Quebec	At Randolph: 300 members of the Republic of Vermont militia

Casualties and losses
None	4 killed 26 prisoners

The Royalton raid was a British-led Indian raid in 1780 against various towns along the White River Valley in the Vermont Republic during the American Revolutionary War. It was the last major Indian raid in New England.

== Raids ==
Lieutenant Richard Houghton of the 53rd Regiment of Foot led 300 Mohawk warriors from the Kahnawake Reserve in the British province of Quebec in October 1780. On October 16, they attacked and burned the towns of Royalton, Sharon, and Tunbridge along the White River in eastern Vermont. This raid was launched in conjunction with other raids led by Major Christopher Carleton of the 29th Regiment of Foot along the shores of Lake Champlain and Lake George, and Sir John Johnson of the King's Royal Regiment of New York in the Mohawk River valley. Four Vermont settlers were killed and 26 were taken prisoner to Quebec.

Houghton and his command were already on their way back north by the time that the local militia could assemble. The militia caught up with them near what is now Randolph, Vermont, and a few volleys were fired back and forth, but Houghton said that the remaining captives might be killed by the Mohawks if fighting continued, so the local militia let the raiders slip away. A plaque at the East Randolph cemetery marks the site of this event.

The Hannah Handy (Hendee) monument on the South Royalton town green is a granite arch honoring a young mother who lost her son in the raid. She crossed the river and successfully begged for the return of several children. She then caught up with Houghton's raiding party and begged him to release the young boys being held by the Mohawks, arguing that they would not survive the trip to Canada and their deaths would be on his hands. Houghton ordered the boys to be released to the woman for safe return to their families. The names of the boys were: Michael Hendee, Roswell Parkhurst (son of Capt. Ebenezer Parkhurst), Andrew and Sheldon Durkee, Joseph Rix, Rufus and ___ Fish, Nathaniel Evans, and Daniel Downer.
