= Joseph Fessenden House =

Historic house in Vermont, United States

- U.S. National Register of Historic Places
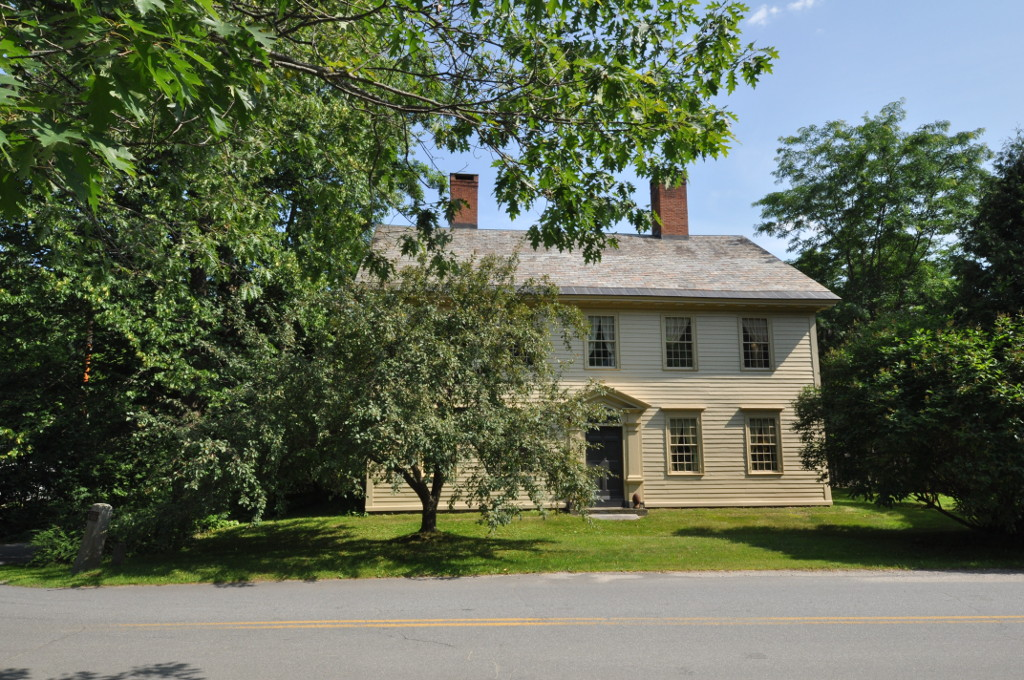

- Location within Vermont
- Location: 58 Bridge St., Royalton, Vermont
- Coordinates: 43°48′54″N 72°32′50″W
- Area: 1.1 acres (0.45 ha)
- Built: 1802
- Architectural style: Georgian, Federal
- NRHP reference No.: 02000953
- Added to NRHP: September 6, 2002

The Joseph Fessenden House is a historic house at 58 Bridge Street in Royalton, Vermont. Built about 1802, it is a high quality local example of transitional Georgian-Federal architecture. It was listed on the National Register of Historic Places in 2002.

== Description and history ==
The Fessenden House is located in Royalton village, at the corner of Bridge Street and Vermont Route 14. It fronts on a former alignment of Route 14, which provides access to the bridge and is separated from the current alignment by an elongated triangular green. The house is 2 1/2 stories in height, with a gabled roof, interior brick chimneys, clapboard siding, and a stone foundation. It has typical Georgian style massing, with a five-bay front facade. Sash windows occupy most of the bays, with the center entrance framed by a Federal period surround consisting of flanking pilasters rising to a gabled partial pediment that surmounts a half-round leaded transom window. First-floor windows are topped by simple projecting cornices. The interior has many high-quality period finishes, including elements of basement kitchens, working dumbwaiters, and Federal and Georgian style fireplace mantels. Near the house stands a 19th-century barn, moved to the site in the 20th century after the original barn was destroyed by fire.

The house was built about 1802, and exhibits an unusually high quality of detail for a small-town rural setting. Many of the buildings exterior and interior designs are derived from plates in Asher Benjamin's 1797 The Country Builder's Assistant, which helped popularize Federal architectural styles. Joseph Fessenden, for whom it was built, was a prosperous local merchant. The house was owned by a succession of well-to-do businessmen, and many of its interior features date from a c. 1830 remodeling.

== See also ==
- National Register of Historic Places listings in Windsor County, Vermont
