= NGC 769 =

Galaxy in the constellation Triangulum

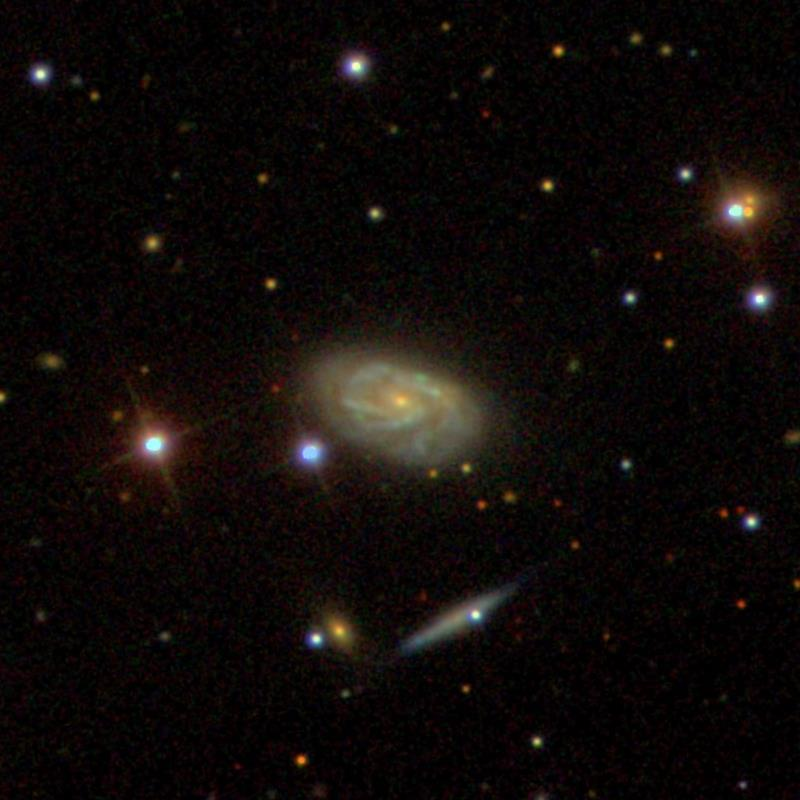
- SDSS image of NGC 769

Observation data (J2000 epoch)
- Constellation: Triangulum
- Right ascension: 01^{h} 59^{m} 35.915^{s}
- Declination: +30° 54′ 35.65″
- Redshift: 0.0148
- Heliocentric radial velocity: 4404 km/s
- Distance: 177 Mly (54.2 Mpc)
- Apparent magnitude (B): 13.4

Characteristics
- Type: Sc

Other designations
- UGC 1467, MCG +05-05-037, PGC 7537

NGC 769 is a spiral galaxy located in the constellation Triangulum about 197 million light years from the Milky Way. It was discovered by the American astronomer Truman Safford in 1866.

== See also ==
- List of NGC objects (1–1000)
