= Mill Covered Bridge (Tunbridge, Vermont) =

- U.S. National Register of Historic Places
- U.S. Historic district – Contributing property
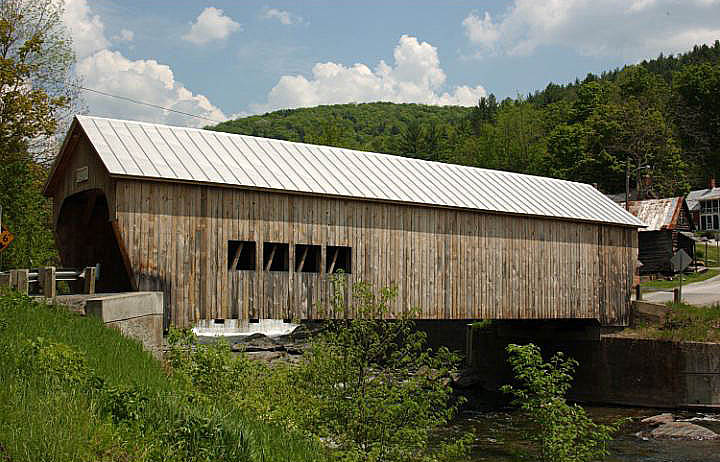

- Location within Vermont Location within the United States
- Location: W of VT 110, over First Branch White River, Tunbridge, Vermont
- Coordinates: 43°53′29″N 72°29′31″W
- Area: 1 acre (0.40 ha)
- Built: 1883
- Architectural style: multiple Kingpost truss
- Part of: Hayward and Kibby Mill (ID92000094)
- NRHP reference No.: 74000243

Significant dates
- Added to NRHP: July 30, 1974
- Designated CP: March 12, 1992

The Mill Covered Bridge is a replica historic covered bridge carrying Spring Road across the First Branch White River in Tunbridge, Vermont. It was built in 2000, nearly replicating a previous structure built on the site in 1883 and lost due to ice damage. It is one of a high concentration of covered bridges in Tunbridge and Chelsea. The 1883 bridge was listed on the National Register of Historic Places in 1974.

== Description and history ==
The Mill Covered Bridge is located on the north side of Tunbridge village, where it carries Spring Road across the First Branch White River, west of Vermont Route 110. It is located among the buildings of the former Hayward and Kibby Mill, a 19th-century mill complex. It is a single-span structure, with multiple kingpost trusses resting on abutments of stone and concrete. It is 72.5 feet (22.1 m) long and has a total width of 19 feet (5.8 m) and a roadway width of 15.5 feet (4.7 m) (one lane). The trusses are reinforced by wrought iron rods, which provide lateral bracing often provided by wooden members in other bridges. The exterior consists of a metal roof and vertical board siding, the latter extending around the portals and a short way into the interior. The floor consists of planking laid parallel to the trusses on supporting stringers.

The historic bridge was built about 1883 by Arthur G. Adams, a local carpenter credited with construction of a number of Tunbridge's five surviving covered bridges. These bridges, along with another in nearby Chelsea, form a remarkable concentration of 19th-century covered bridges in the state. This bridge was severely damaged by ice floes in March 1999 and subsequently demolished. A substantially similar bridge was completed on the site the following year.

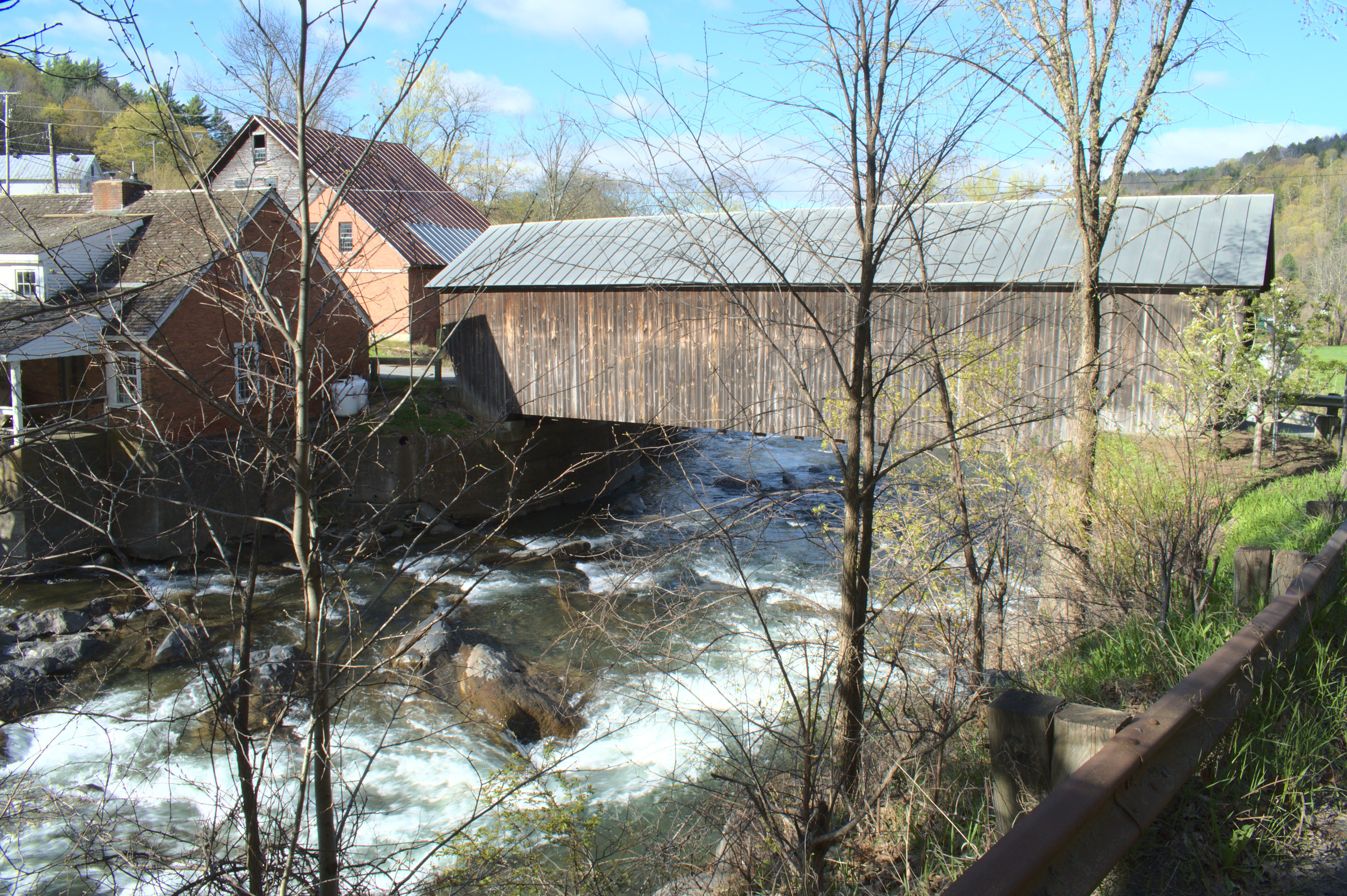

== See also ==
- National Register of Historic Places listings in Orange County, Vermont
- List of Vermont covered bridges
- List of bridges on the National Register of Historic Places in Vermont
