= ANICHINI, Inc. =

- Type: Private
- Industry: Textiles
- Founded: 1985, Tunbridge, Vermont
- Founder: Susan Dollenmaier
- Headquarters: Tunbridge, Vermont, United States
- Area served: United States and Canada
- Products: Luxury textiles
- Number of employees: 22 (2015)
- Website: www.anichini.com

ANICHINI, Inc. is an American luxury textiles company based in Tunbridge, Vermont. The company is a manufacturer and importer of luxury linens and textiles and produces hand made products in the United States. According to the Martha Stewart American Made website, ANICHINI is a full-spectrum textile company. ANICHINI products have been featured in Architectural Digest, Elle Decor, Gotham, and House Beautiful magazines and used by celebrities Cher, Sharon Stone, Christina Aguilera, Tom Cruise, Oprah Winfrey, Barbra Streisand, Madonna, Mariah Carey, Martha Stewart, and Steven Spielberg.

== Overview ==
ANICHINI was founded in 1980 by Susan Dollenmaier and Patrizia Anichini. The pair named the business after ANICHINI because of the Tuscan roots of the name. Initially the duo acted as purveyors of linens and antiques, they eventually began adding embellishments on existing products and building a brand name. In 1986, Dollenmaier moved the business to Tunbridge, Vermont and began importing fabrics from abroad and using locally based Vermont seamstresses to create custom designs. Dollenmaier became the full owner of the company in 1999. In 2001, Dollenmaier was named Vermont's Small Business Person by Vermont Business Magazine. ANICHINI imports, exports, wholesales, retails and manufactures textiles.

ANICHINI entered the hospitality business by producing bedding for five-star hotels and spas such as Caesars Palace, the Waldorf Astoria Towers, Canyon Ranch, and The Benjamin Hotel in New York. In 2006, ANICHINI's wholesale and retail sales went from $10 million to $20 million due to business with hotels.

The company's products have been in several films including Sex and the City and Forrest Gump. ANICHINI's Italian sheets were featured in the movie The Twilight Saga: Breaking Dawn – Part 1.
