= Sharon, Vermont =

- Town
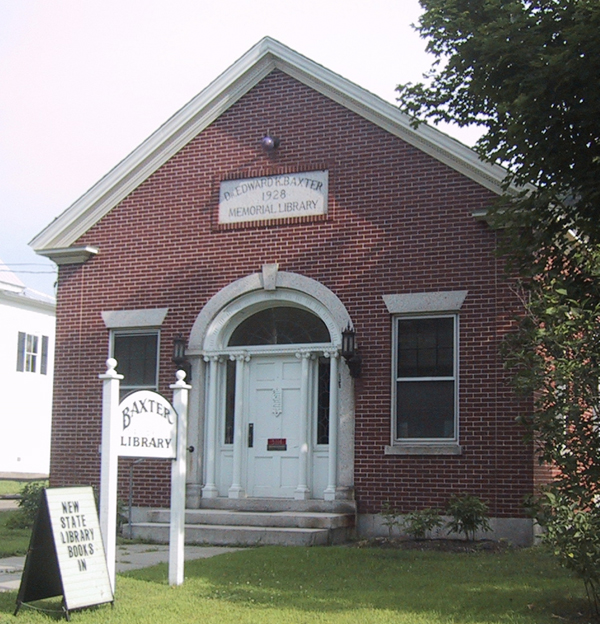
- Baxter Memorial Library

- Logo

- Location in Windsor County and the state of Vermont
- Coordinates: 43°46′25″N 72°26′38″W
- Country: United States
- State: Vermont
- County: Windsor
- Chartered: 1761

Area
  - Total: 40.1 sq mi (103.8 km^{2})
  - Land: 39.6 sq mi (102.6 km^{2})
  - Water: 0.46 sq mi (1.2 km^{2})
- Elevation: 1,207 ft (368 m)

Population (2020)
  - Total: 1,560
  - Density: 39.4/sq mi (15.2/km^{2})
- Time zone: UTC-5 (EST)
  - Summer (DST): UTC-4 (EDT)
- ZIP Codes: 05065 (Sharon); 05068 (South Royalton)
- Area code: 802
- FIPS code: 50-63775
- GNIS feature ID: 1462204
- Website: www.sharonvt.gov

Sharon is a town in Windsor County, Vermont, United States. It had a population of 1,560 at the 2020 census.

Sharon is the birthplace of Joseph Smith, founder of Mormonism. The town is also home to The Sharon Academy, an independent middle and high school.

== History ==
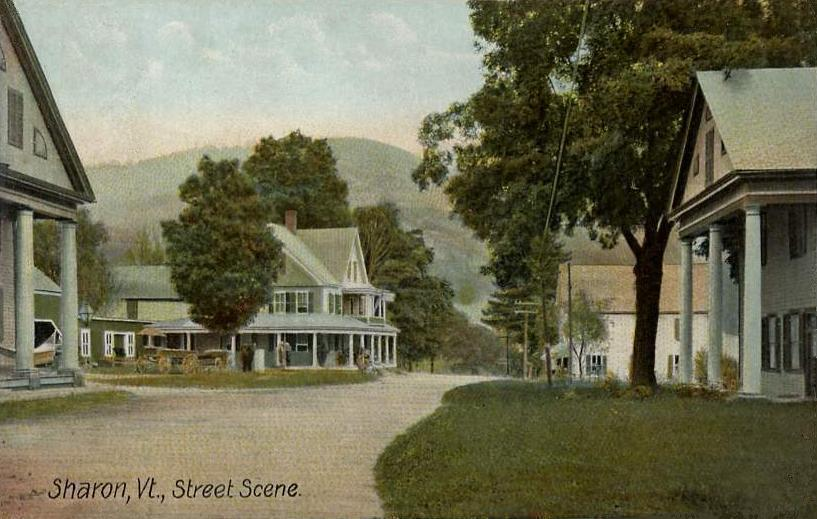
Street scene c. 1906

One of the New Hampshire grants, the township was created on August 17, 1761, by a royal charter which King George III of the United Kingdom issued to Governor Benning Wentworth. It was granted to John Taylor and 61 others, many from Sharon, Connecticut. The town was first settled about 1765 by Robert Havens and family. In 1780 during the Revolution, the village was attacked in the Royalton Raid, when a combined British-Mohawk force attacked and burnt the town.

Although the surface of the town is broken, the intervales contain fertile soil, and farming became an important industry. On June 26, 1848, the Vermont Central Railroad opened from White River Junction to Bethel, traversing Sharon and accelerating its development. The White River and its tributaries provided water power for mills. By 1859, when the population reached 1,240, Sharon had 12 sawmills, a gristmill, and a bobbin factory. Many of Sharon's most historic homes still line the White River.

In the mid-20th century the main form of employment in Sharon was still the lumber industry.

== Geography ==
According to the United States Census Bureau, the town has a total area of 40.1 square miles (103.9 km^{2}), of which 39.6 square miles (102.6 km^{2}) is land and 0.5 square mile (1.2 km^{2}) (1.20%) is water. Sharon is drained by the White River and its tributaries.

The town is crossed by Interstate 89 and Vermont routes 14 and 132.

== Demographics ==
Historical population
Census	Pop.	Note	%±
1790	569		—
1800	1,158		103.5%
1810	1,363		17.7%
1820	1,431		5.0%
1830	1,459		2.0%
1840	1,371		−6.0%
1850	1,240		−9.6%
1860	1,111		−10.4%
1870	1,013		−8.8%
1880	1,012		−0.1%
1890	737		−27.2%
1900	709		−3.8%
1910	585		−17.5%
1920	545		−6.8%
1930	569		4.4%
1940	530		−6.9%
1950	470		−11.3%
1960	485		3.2%
1970	541		11.5%
1980	828		53.0%
1990	1,211		46.3%
2000	1,411		16.5%
2010	1,502		6.4%
2020	1,560		3.9%
U.S. Decennial Census

As of the census of 2000, there were 1,411 people, 553 households, and 378 families residing in the town. The population density was 35.6 people per square mile (13.8/km^{2}). There were 663 housing units at an average density of 16.7 per square mile (6.5/km^{2}). The racial makeup of the town was 97.17% White, 0.57% African American, 0.43% Native American, 0.64% Asian, and 1.20% from two or more races. Hispanic or Latino of any race were 0.99% of the population.

There were 553 households, out of which 36.5% had children under the age of 18 living with them, 58.0% were married couples living together, 7.4% had a female householder with no husband present, and 31.5% were non-families. 24.6% of all households were made up of individuals, and 6.9% had someone living alone who was 65 years of age or older. The average household size was 2.55 and the average family size was 3.06.

In the town, the population was spread out, with 27.8% under the age of 18, 5.7% from 18 to 24, 30.4% from 25 to 44, 28.2% from 45 to 64, and 7.9% who were 65 years of age or older. The median age was 38 years. For every 100 females, there were 102.4 males. For every 100 females age 18 and over, there were 102.2 males. The median age of the population was 37.

The median income for a household in the town was $40,952, and the median income for a family was $47,500. Males had a median income of $32,112 versus $28,472 for females. The per capita income for the town was $20,824. About 5.3% of families and 7.3% of the population were below the poverty line, including 5.5% of those under age 18 and 9.4% of those age 65 or over.

=== 2010 census ===
As of the 2010 Census Sharon had a population of 1,502. The median age was 44 years old. The population was 95.5% non-Hispanic white, 0.9% African-American, 0.4% Native American, 0.7% Asian, 0.1% reporting some other race, 1.3% reporting two or more races and 1.2% Hispanic or Latino.

== Sites of interest ==
- Joseph Smith Birthplace Memorial
- Sharon Historical Society & Museum
- The Sharon Academy
- Baxter Memorial Library

== Notable people ==
- Jason Downer, justice of the Wisconsin Supreme Court
- Robby Mook, political campaign strategist, campaign manager for Hillary Clinton
- Joseph Olshan, American novelist and book publisher
- Charley Parkhurst, famous stagecoach driver
- Joseph Smith, founder of the Latter Day Saint movement
- John Spaulding, Vermont State Treasurer
