= Royalton, Vermont =

- Town
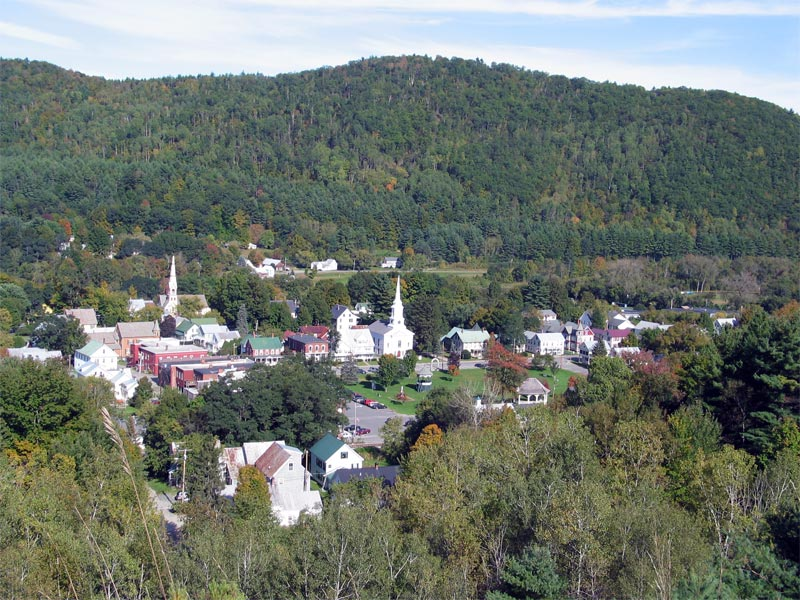
- Village of South Royalton from Interstate 89

- Seal

- Location in Windsor County and the state of Vermont
- Coordinates: 43°48′58″N 72°33′50″W
- Country: United States
- State: Vermont
- County: Windsor
- Chartered: 1769
- Settled: 1771
- Organized: 1774
- Communities: Royalton; North Royalton; South Royalton

Area
  - Total: 40.9 sq mi (106.0 km^{2})
  - Land: 40.4 sq mi (104.7 km^{2})
  - Water: 0.50 sq mi (1.3 km^{2})
- Elevation: 505 ft (154 m)

Population (2020)
  - Total: 2,750
  - Density: 68.0/sq mi (26.3/km^{2})
- Time zone: UTC-5 (EST)
  - Summer (DST): UTC-4 (EDT)
- ZIP Codes: 05068 (South Royalton); 05032 (Bethel)
- Area code: 802
- FIPS code: 50-60850
- GNIS feature ID: 1462191
- Website: www.royaltonvt.gov

Royalton is a town in Windsor County, Vermont, United States. The population was 2,750 at the 2020 census. It includes the villages of Royalton, South Royalton, and North Royalton. Vermont Law and Graduate School, the state's only accredited law school, is located in South Royalton.

== History ==
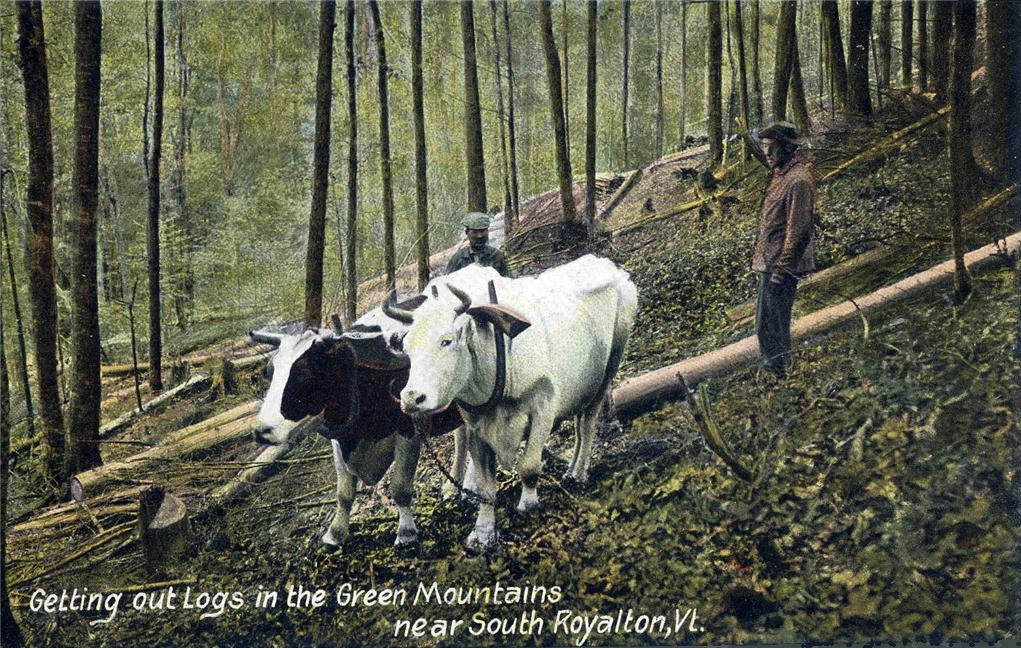
Logging scene c. 1907

The town was chartered on November 23, 1769, by Cadwallader Colden, Royal Lieutenant Governor of New York. The first permanent settlers were Robert Havens and his family, who arrived in 1771. Royalton was re-chartered by the Independent Republic of Vermont on December 20, 1781. The 1780 Royalton Raid was the last major British raid of the American War of Independence in New England. In 1848, the Vermont Central Railroad opened to South Royalton, which developed as a freight depot.

During the Revolutionary War Royalton was visited by Gilbert du Motier, Marquis de Lafayette

Although Joseph Smith, founder of Mormonism, was born in the adjacent town of Sharon near the Royalton boundary, the Joseph Smith Birthplace Memorial lies in the town.

In June 1974, the now-defunct Royalton College hosted the Institute for Humane Studies' Conference on Austrian Economics. The conference is considered the "single most important catalyst in this revival of Austrian economics", an economic theory also known as "The Austrian School", the "Vienna School" or the "Psychological School". Edwin G. Dolan hosted the conference. Notable presenters included Israel M. Kirzner, Ludwig M. Lachmann, and Murray N. Rothbard. The edited version of the conference proceedings appears in Professor Dolan's The Foundations of Modern Austrian Economics.

A landscape photo of Royalton stands in as the fictional town of Stars Hollow in the opening credits of Gilmore Girls. In the mid-20th-century, Royalton had an economy largely built around lumbering, dairy production, poultry raising, the raising of fresh produce vegetables and maple sugar production.

== Geography ==
The town is located on the east side of the Green Mountains, and the White River cuts through its center. According to the United States Census Bureau, the town has a total area of 40.9 square miles (106.0 km^{2}), of which 40.4 square miles (104.7 km^{2}) is land and 0.5 square mile (1.3 km^{2}) (1.25%) is water.

The town is crossed by Interstate 89 and Vermont routes 14, 107 and 110. It is bordered by the town of Bethel to the northwest, Randolph to the north, Tunbridge to the northeast, Strafford to the east, Sharon to the southeast, Pomfret to the south, and Barnard to the southwest.

== Demographics ==
Historical population
Census	Pop.	Note	%±
1790	748		—
1800	1,501		100.7%
1810	1,753		16.8%
1820	1,816		3.6%
1830	1,893		4.2%
1840	1,917		1.3%
1850	1,850		−3.5%
1860	1,739		−6.0%
1870	1,679		−3.5%
1880	1,558		−7.2%
1890	1,433		−8.0%
1900	1,427		−0.4%
1910	1,452		1.8%
1920	1,469		1.2%
1930	1,491		1.5%
1940	1,291		−13.4%
1950	1,331		3.1%
1960	1,388		4.3%
1970	1,399		0.8%
1980	2,100		50.1%
1990	2,389		13.8%
2000	2,603		9.0%
2010	2,773		6.5%
2020	2,750		−0.8%
U.S. Decennial Census

As of the census of 2000, there were 2,602 people, 1,155 households, and 622 families residing in the town. The population density was 64.4 people per square mile (24.9/km^{2}). There were 1,281 housing units at an average density of 31.7 per square mile (12.2/km^{2}). The racial makeup of the town was 97.20% White, 0.77% African American, 0.42% Native American, 0.77% Asian, and 0.85% from two or more races. Hispanic or Latino of any race were 0.88% of the population.

There were 1,155 households, out of which 26.5% had children under the age of 18 living with them, 43.8% were couples living together and joined in either marriage or civil union, 6.8% had a female householder with no husband present, and 46.1% were non-families. 34.5% of all households were made up of individuals, and 7.3% had someone living alone who was 65 years of age or older. The average household size was 2.24 and the average family size was 2.95.

In the town, the population was spread out, with 22.3% under the age of 18, 10.5% from 18 to 24, 35.5% from 25 to 44, 20.9% from 45 to 64, and 10.8% who were 65 years of age or older. The median age was 34 years. For every 100 females, there were 102.7 males. For every 100 females age 18 and over, there were 98.7 males.

The median income for a household in the town was $30,943, and the median income for a family was $42,898. Males had a median income of $29,708 versus $26,667 for females. The per capita income for the town was $16,755. About 7.6% of families and 15.0% of the population were below the poverty line, including 9.3% of those under age 18 and 11.6% of those age 65 or over.

=== 2010 census ===
As of the 2010 census Royalton had a population of 2,773. The median age was 36.

The population was 94.4% non-Hispanic white, 0.9% black, 0.4% Native American, 1.2% Asian, 0.1% Pacific Islander, 0.1% reporting some other race, 1.7% reporting two or more races and 1.5% Hispanic or Latino.

== Sites of interest ==
- Joseph Smith Birthplace Memorial
- Royalton Historical Society & Museum
- Royalton Raid Monument

== Notable people ==
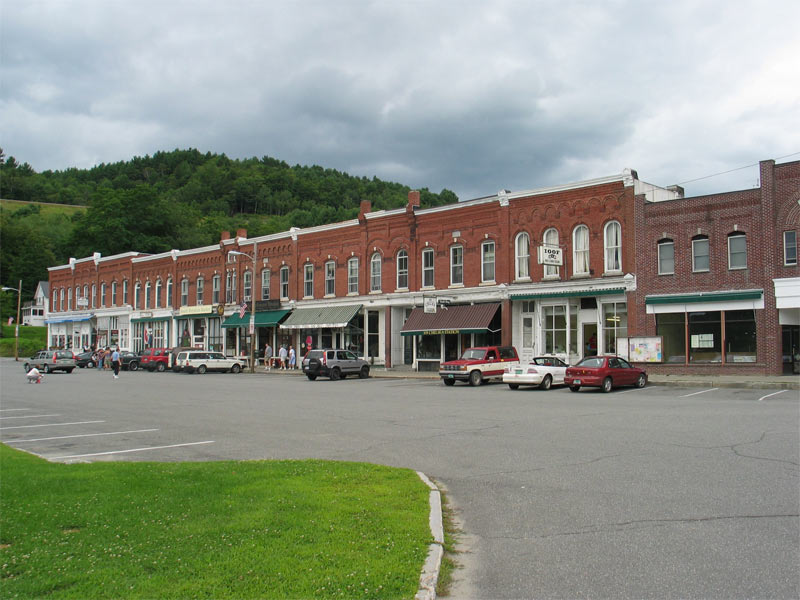
Village of South Royalton

- Franklin Noble Billings, Woodstock businessman
- Frederick H. Billings, lawyer, financier and railroad president
- Albert Carrington, religious leader
- Henry A. Chase, state assemblyman from Wisconsin
- Salmon P. Chase, US senator and 23rd governor of Ohio
- Jacob Collamer, US congressman, senator, and postmaster general
- Dudley Chase Denison, US congressman
- Charles Durkee, US senator
- Lemuel W. Joiner, state congressman and state senator from Wisconsin
- Truman Henry Safford, calculating prodigy
- Horatio N. Smith, state assemblyman and state senator from Wisconsin
- Patrick Henry Smith, merchant and state senator from Wisconsin
- William Smith, religious leader
