= Truman Henry Safford =

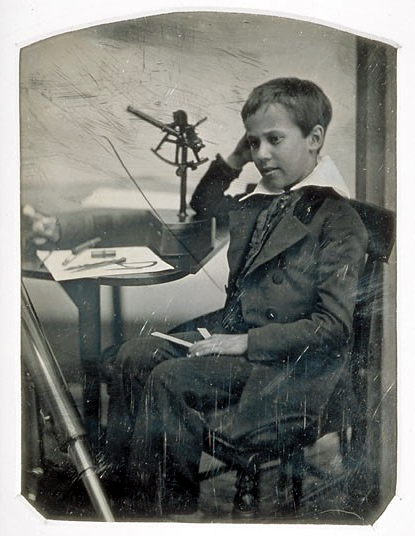
- Safford circa 1844, by Southworth & Hawes
- Born: January 6, 1836; Royalton, Vermont, United States
- Died: June 13, 1901 (aged 65); Newark, New Jersey, United States
- Known for: Calculating prodigy

Truman Henry Safford (6 January 1836 – 13 June 1901) was an American calculating prodigy. In later life he was an observatory director.

== Biography ==
Safford was born in Royalton, Vermont, on 6 January 1836. At an early age he attracted public attention by his remarkable calculation powers. At the age of nine, a local priest asked him to multiply 365,365,365,365,365,365 by itself. In less than a minute, Truman gave the correct answer of 133,491,850,208,566,925,016,658,299,941,583,225 with no paper. At around this age he also developed a new rule for calculating the moon's risings and settings, taking one-quarter of the time of the existing method.

Unlike many other calculating prodigies, Safford did not give public exhibitions. He went to Harvard College where he studied astronomy. During his time at Harvard, he was part of the founding class of the Rho chapter of the Zeta Psi fraternity. He became the second director of the Hopkins Observatory at Williams College, the oldest extant astronomical observatory in the United States. Safford served as director of the Observatory until his death.

In 1894, Safford had a stroke. He died on 13 June 1901 at 112 Broad Street in Newark, New Jersey where he was living with his son.

== Legacy ==
The Safford Fund for Williams College student researchers was created by his descendants to honor him. A portrait of him as a child prodigy hangs in the Hopkins Observatory's Mehlin Museum of Astronomy, adjacent to the Milham Planetarium. His natural calculating abilities seemed to wane with age.
