= Tunbridge, Vermont =

- Town
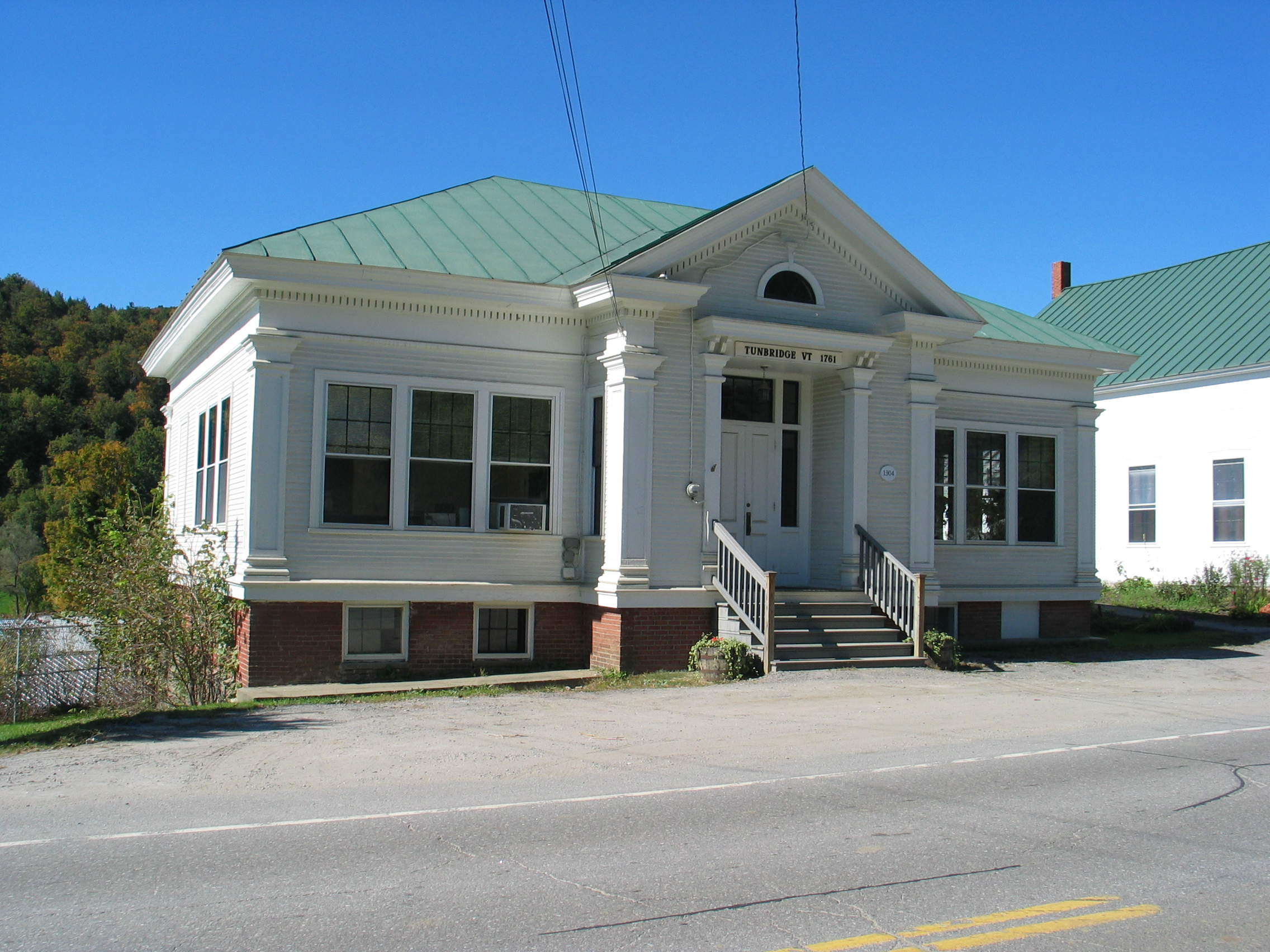
- Tunbridge town office

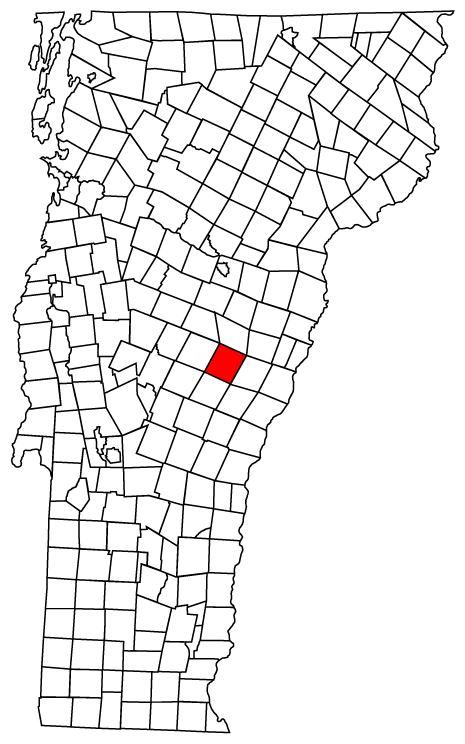
- Located in Orange County, Vermont
- Coordinates: 43°53′05″N 72°30′37″W
- Country: United States
- State: Vermont
- County: Orange
- Chartered: 1761
- Settled: 1776
- Organized: 1786
- Communities: Tunbridge; North Tunbridge; South Tunbridge

Area
  - Total: 44.7 sq mi (115.9 km^{2})
  - Land: 44.7 sq mi (115.9 km^{2})
  - Water: 0.039 sq mi (0.1 km^{2}) 0.09%
- Elevation: 568 ft (173 m)

Population (2020)
  - Total: 1,337
  - Density: 30/sq mi (11.5/km^{2})
  - Households: 548
  - Families: 343
- Time zone: UTC-5 (EST)
  - Summer (DST): UTC-4 (EDT)
- ZIP Codes: 05077 (Tunbridge); 05061 (Randolph Center); 05038 (Chelsea)
- Area code: 802
- FIPS code: 50-73675
- GNIS feature ID: 1462231
- Website: www.tunbridgevt.org

Tunbridge is a town in Orange County, Vermont, United States. As of the 2020 United States Census the town population was 1,337. The town consists of three village centers, all situated on Vermont Route 110 in the valley of the first branch of the White River. The three settlements are named North Tunbridge (also known locally as "Blood Village"), Tunbridge Village ("Market") and South Tunbridge ("Jigger").

== Historic sites ==
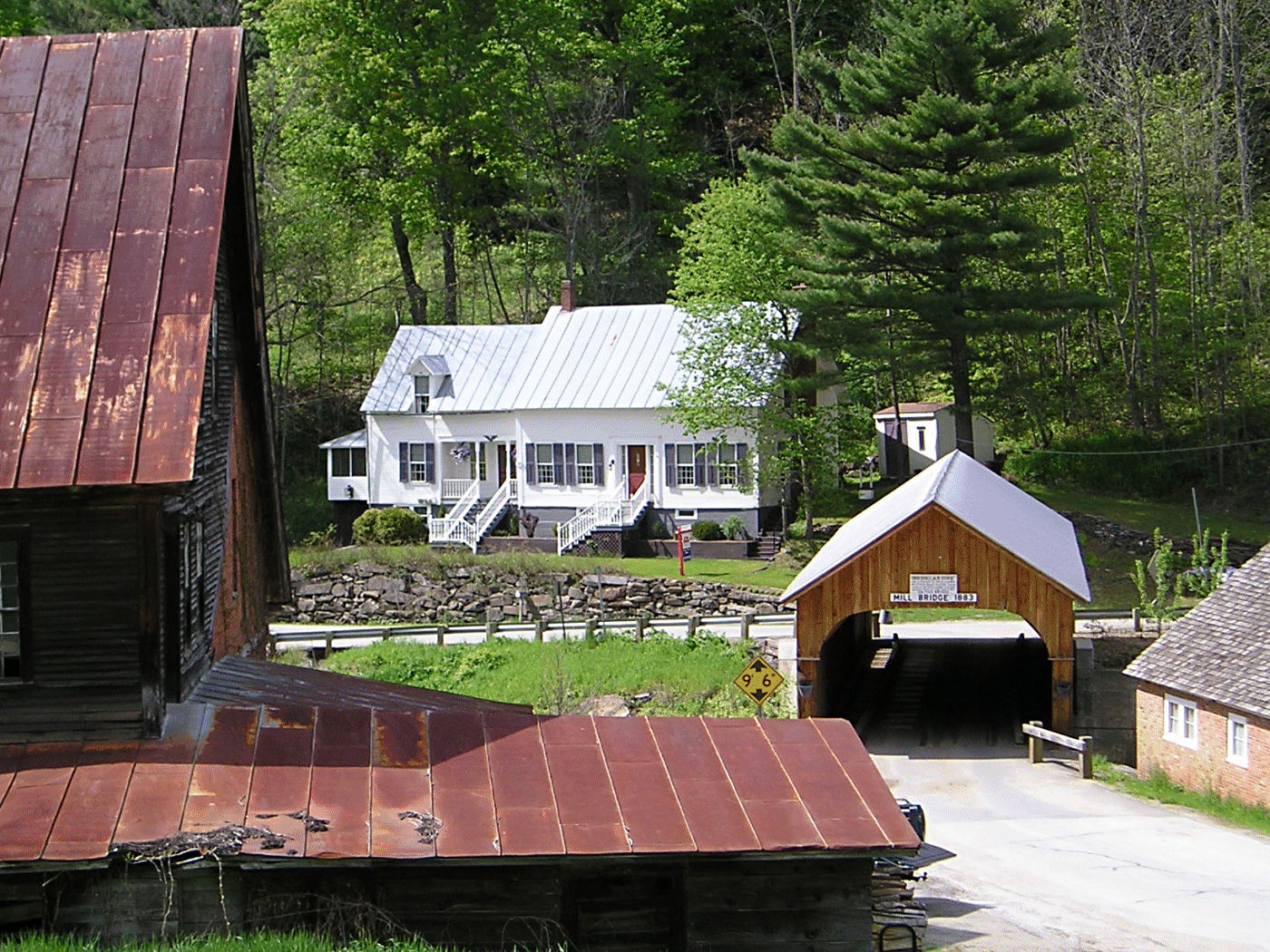
Hayward and Noble Mill, and Mill Bridge

The entire center of Tunbridge Village, including the fairgrounds, was placed on the National Register of Historic Places in 1994. Officially the district listing is "Roughly, along VT 110 and adjacent rds. including Town Rd. 45 and Spring and Strafford Rds."

Tunbridge has five covered bridges (all listed on the National Register)

- Cilley Bridge – southwest of Tunbridge Village (off Howe Lane from VT 110)
- Flint Bridge – North Tunbridge on Bicknell Hill Road (off VT 110)
- Larkin Bridge – North Tunbridge on Larkin Road (off VT 110)
- Howe Bridge – South of Tunbridge Village (entering on VT 110) at Belknap Road
- Mill (or Hayward & Noble or Spring Rd.) Bridge —in the Village, west side of VT 110 on Spring Road

Tunbridge also has two other structures are individually listed on the National Register:

- Hayward & Kibby (or Hayward & Noble) Mill – on Spring Road in Tunbridge Village
- South Tunbridge Methodist Episcopal Church

== Tunbridge World's Fair ==
The historical antecedent of the Tunbridge World's Fair can be traced to the town's charter, which therein authorized the establishment of two annual fairs when the population of the town reached fifty families.

It wasn't until 1867 that, after a succession of fairs in Orange County starting in 1847, the Tunbridge Agricultural Society was organized and staged a fair at the Elisha Lougee Farm in North Tunbridge. At the 1867 fair, Vermont's former Lieutenant Governor Burnham Martin referred to the fair as a "little World's Fair". Lewis Dickerman adopted the phrase and used it in the 1868 publicity handbills and the Tunbridge fair has since used the name.

In 1875, the Union Agricultural Society assumed the sponsorship of the fair and moved its location to the present fairgrounds in the center of Tunbridge.

In 1894, the fair joined the National Trotting Association, and for many years has maintained the only remaining grass race track in Vermont.

The annual fair continues to this day with demonstrations of farming and agricultural traditions and culture, working antique displays, horse and ox pulling, horse racing, cattle and horse shows, junior exhibits, floral and 4-H exhibits, contra dancing, gymkhana, and many free shows.

== Geography and geology ==
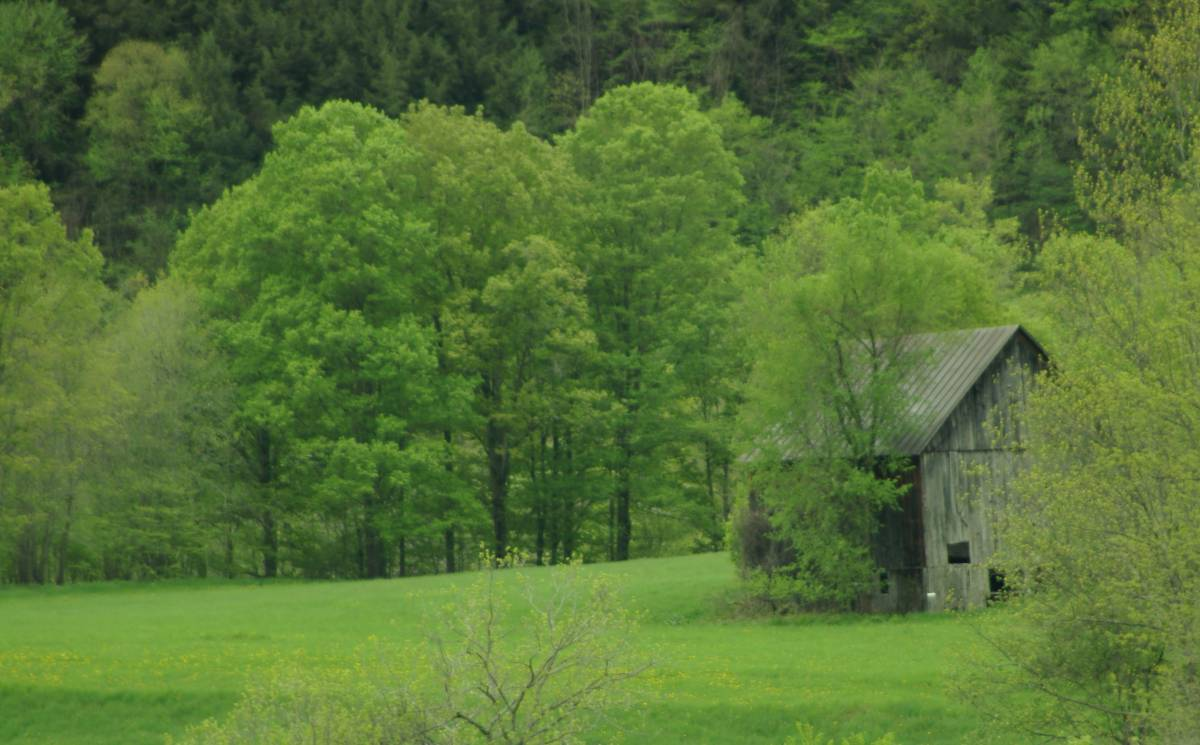
Tucker's Barn, Tunbridge Vermont

According to the United States Census Bureau, the town has a total area of 44.8square miles (115.9km^{2}), of which 44.7square miles (115.9km^{2}) is land and 0.04square mile (0.1km^{2}) (0.04%) is water. The First Branch of the White River running north to south divides Tunbridge into two nearly equal parts. Two mineral springs exist in the town, one of which is a white sulphur spring located on "Spring road," one and a half miles from Tunbridge Center; this spring was once valued for its medicinal properties.

The highest points of land are Brocklebank Hill at 2100+ ft near the northern boundary with Chelsea, Old Hurricane Hill at 1900+ ft in the northwestern part near East Randolph, and East Hill at 2112ft near the Strafford line. The soil is well-drained and was formed in Wisconsin-age glacial till, its average depth is around 20 to 40inches. Typical composition of the soil: a surface layer of very dark brown, partially decomposed organic material; a subsurface layer of gray fine sandy loam; upper subsoil of dark brown fine sandy loam and subsoil of brown channery fine sandy loam. The rocks underlying Tunbridge are entirely of the calciferous mica schist formation, with a small bed of granite, syenite and protogine in the northeastern part.

No. 9 of the Acts of 1985, effective March 27, 1985, designated the Tunbridge Soil Series as the official State Soil. The Tunbridge series (course-loamy, mixed, frigid Typic Haplothrod) consists of moderately deep to bedrock, well drained soils. It was selected from among more than 160 different soil series in the state. As it is a typical "hill farm" and "sugarbush" soil, the Tunbridge series well represents the soil resources of Vermont. A soil formed in loamy glacial till, it has good potential for agriculture and forestry. As Professor Richmond Bartlett of UVM says, "It's the soil that makes Vermont hills greener than those either in New Hampshire or New York."
---From Office of the Secretary of State, Vermont Legislative Directory and State Manual, Biennial Session, 1993–1994, p. 16.

Typical species of tree to be found in the landscape are white birch, yellow birch, American beech, red spruce, red maple, sugar maple, white ash, hemlock and white pine.

== Demographics ==
Historical population
Census	Pop.	Note	%±
1790	487		—
1800	1,314		169.8%
1810	1,640		24.8%
1820	2,003		22.1%
1830	1,920		−4.1%
1840	1,811		−5.7%
1850	1,786		−1.4%
1860	1,546		−13.4%
1870	1,405		−9.1%
1880	1,252		−10.9%
1890	1,011		−19.2%
1900	885		−12.5%
1910	918		3.7%
1920	907		−1.2%
1930	903		−0.4%
1940	882		−2.3%
1950	774		−12.2%
1960	743		−4.0%
1970	791		6.5%
1980	925		16.9%
1990	1,154		24.8%
2000	1,309		13.4%
2010	1,284		−1.9%
2020	1,337		4.1%
U.S. Decennial Census

As of the census of 2000, there were 1,309 people, 513 households, and 362 families residing in the town. The population density was 29.3 people per square mile (11.3/km^{2}). There were 679 housing units at an average density of 15.2 per square mile (5.9/km^{2}). The racial makeup of the town was 99.01% White, 0.23% African American, 0.08% Native American, 0.15% Asian, and 0.53% from two or more races. Hispanic or Latino of any race were 0.99% of the population.

There were 513 households, out of which 31.0% had children under the age of 18 living with them, 55.0% were couples living together and joined in either marriage or civil union, 11.3% had a female householder with no husband present, and 29.4% were non-families. 21.1% of all households were made up of individuals, and 8.4% had someone living alone who was 65 years of age or older. The average household size was 2.55 and the average family size was 2.94.

In the town, the population was spread out, with 25.4% under the age of 18, 5.1% from 18 to 24, 31.5% from 25 to 44, 24.8% from 45 to 64, and 13.2% who were 65 years of age or older. The median age was 38 years. For every 100 females, there were 99.5 males. For every 100 females age 18 and over, there were 95.4 males.

The median income for a household in the town was $40,855, and the median income for a family was $45,670. Males had a median income of $27,465 versus $23,182 for females. The per capita income for the town was $19,934. About 8.4% of families and 12.1% of the population were below the poverty line, including 17.8% of those under age 18 and 8.3% of those age 65 or over. the unemployment rate is 3.2% and the average commute time is 26.9 minutes.

84.9% of the Tunbridge population studied at high school level or higher and 25.8% have studied at bachelors level or higher.

== Notable people ==
- Sarah E. Buxton, member, Vermont House of Representatives
- David M. Camp, Lieutenant Governor of Vermont, 1836–1841
- Susan Dollenmaier, founder of ANICHINI, Inc.
- Frank A. Haskell, colonel in the Union Army and author of an account of the Battle of Gettysburg
- Harry David Lee, founder of Lee Jeans
- Solomon Mack, Veteran of the French and Indian War and American Revolution, grandfather of Joseph Smith Jr.
- Stephen Mack, merchant and politician
- Ivy Mix, bartender credited with popularizing mezcal in the United States
- John O'Brien, film maker and director
- Hyrum Smith, leader in the early Latter Day Saint movement
- Joseph Smith Sr., father of Joseph Smith Jr. and first Presiding Patriarch in the Latter Day Saint movement
- Samuel Harrison Smith, missionary
- Fred Tuttle, farmer, movie actor, candidate for political office

== Cemeteries ==
Dates represent years in use.

- Button: 1780–present
- Dickerman Hill: 1807–1934
- Drew: 1814–1881
- Durkee: 1812–1981
- Hunt: 1802–present
- Hutchinson: 1788–1923
- Hutchinson Lot: 1844–1860
- Kelsey Mt.: 1792–1921
- Monarch Hill: 1814–1876
- Mt. Pleasant: 1798–1982
- Old Meeting House: 1816–1940
- Ordway: 1813–1893
- Riddall: 1818–1820
- Smith: 1807–1881
- South Tunbridge: ? - present
- Spring Road (new): 1842–present
- Spring Road (old): 1831–1885
- Strafford Road: 1800–1968
- Tunbridge Village: 1807–present
- Ward Hill: 1804–1884
- Whitney Hill: 1809–1915
