= White River (Vermont) =

River in the U.S. state of Vermont

Coordinates: 43°57′39″N 72°52′47″W

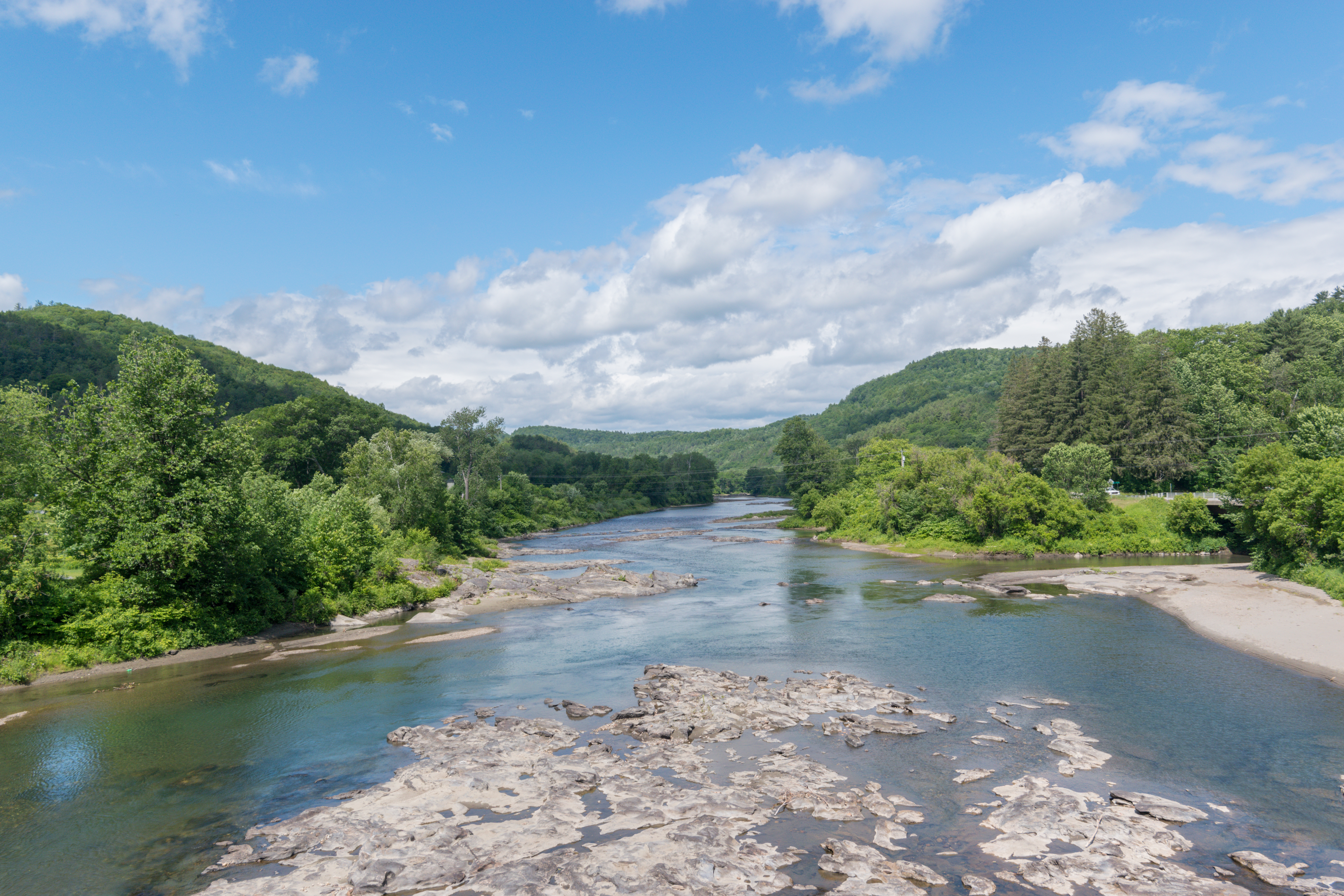
The White River in South Royalton, Vermont

The White River is a 60.1-mile-long (96.7 km) river in the U.S. state of Vermont. It is a tributary of the Connecticut River, and the namesake of the White River Valley.

Indigenous Origin: long before European colonization, the Indigenous Abenaki people called the waterway Wôbatekw, which translates directly to "clear stream" or "clear river". When European settlers arrived in the region, they translated the descriptive Abenaki concept into English, renaming it the White River due to its exceptionally clear, clean waters and white, tumbling rapids.

The White River rises at Skylight Pond south of Bread Loaf Mountain near the crest of the Green Mountains. The river flows east to the town of Granville, where it receives the outflow from the southern portion of Granville Notch. The river then turns south and, followed by Vermont Route 100, flows through the towns of Hancock and Rochester. Entering Stockbridge, the river turns northeast and, followed by Vermont Route 107, flows to the town of Bethel, where the Third Branch of the White River enters from the north. The Second Branch and the First Branch of the White River also enter from the north as the river flows through Royalton.

From Royalton to the river's mouth, the valley is occupied by Interstate 89 and Vermont Route 14. Flowing southeast, the river passes through the town of Sharon and enters the town of Hartford, where it reaches the Connecticut River at the village of White River Junction.

== See also ==
- List of rivers of Vermont
