= Post Mills Church =

Historic church in Vermont, United States

- U.S. National Register of Historic Places
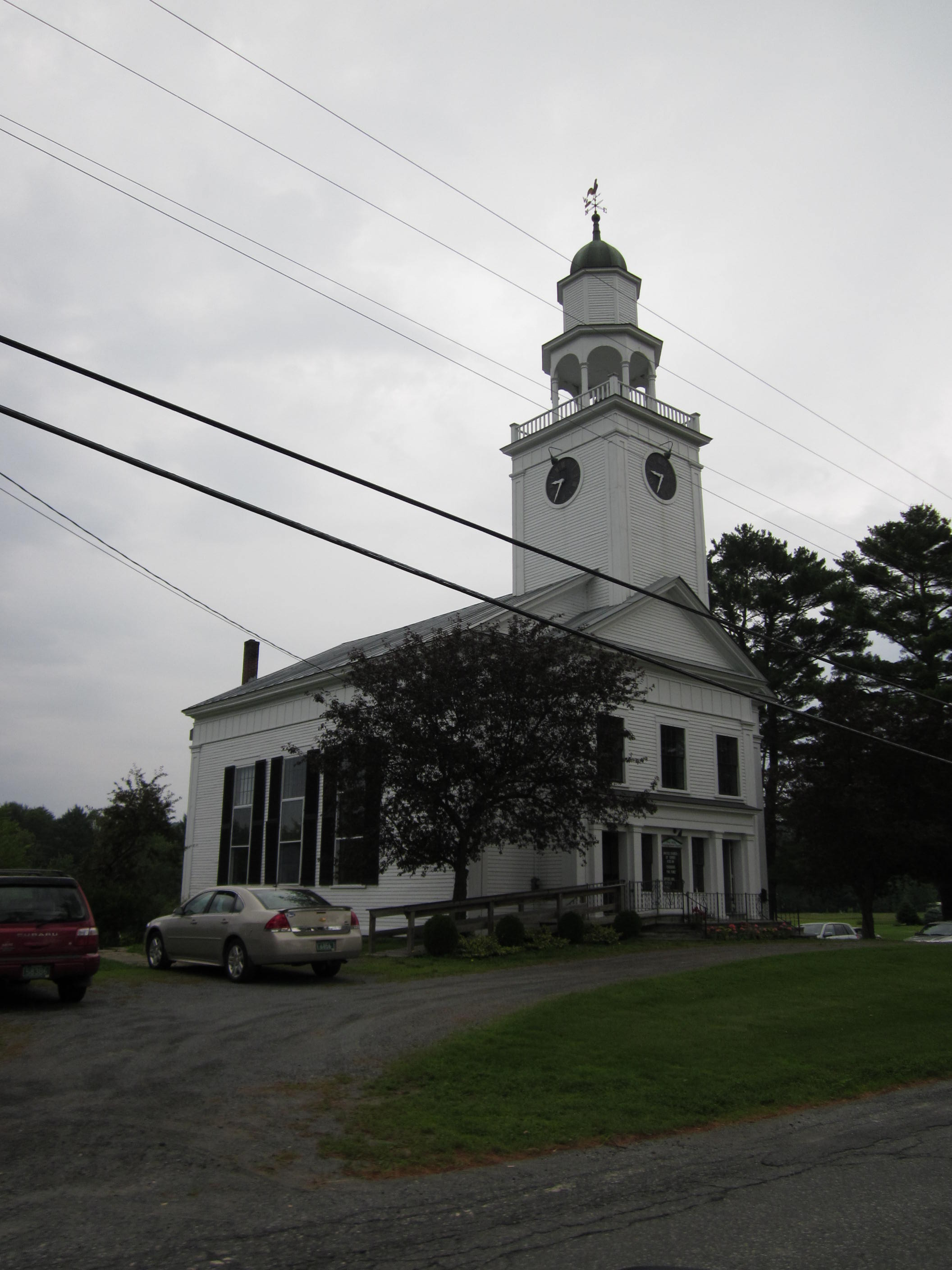

- Location within Vermont Location within the United States
- Location: 449 VT 244, E of jct. with VT 113, Thetford, Vermont
- Coordinates: 43°53′14″N 72°15′8″W
- Area: 0.3 acres (0.12 ha)
- Built: 1818
- Architect: Dodge, Capt. E.S.
- Architectural style: Greek Revival
- NRHP reference No.: 92001489
- Added to NRHP: October 29, 1992

The Post Mills Church is a historic church at 449 Vermont Route 244 in the Post Mills village of Thetford, Vermont. Built in 1818 and remodeled in 1855, it is an excellent example of Greek Revival architecture, with extremely rare late 19th century stencilwork on its interior walls and ceiling. It was listed on the National Register of Historic Places in 1992. The congregation is affiliated with the United Church of Christ.

== Description and history ==
The Post Mills Church stands in the eastern portion of the dispersed rural village of Post Mills in northern Thetford, on the north side of Vermont 244 near its junction with Robinson Hill Road. It is a single-story wood-frame structure, with a gabled roof, clapboarded exterior, and concrete block foundation. The main facade faces south, and has a central projecting section with fully pedimented gable. A square tower rises, straddling the main roof and front section, with a clock in the first stage, which is topped by a low balustrade. Above that is an open octagonal belfry with arched openings, and an octagonal third stage topped by a bellcast roof and weathervane. The front facade has corner pilasters at the corners of both the main building and projection, and an entablature extends across the front and the sides. The portion of the entablature on the projecting section has a distinctive frieze, created in 1855 out of the doors of the building's original box pews. The interior originally with a three-sided gallery, now only has a gallery at the rear, with bench pews facing the pulpit at the rear.

The church was built in 1818, and was originally more Federal in its appearance, based in part on plans published by Asher Benjamin. It underwent a major renovation in 1855, when the pews were replaced, a platform built for the pulpit, and the side galleries were removed. In 1887, when the plaster of the walls and ceilings was renewed, Hiram Powell decorated them with stencilwork. This type of decoration is extremely rare and fragile, because of its use of water-based distemper paint. Elements of this work were carefully restored in the 20th century.

The church was built for use by two congregations, one Baptist and the other Congregationalist. Local residents had for some years complained about the long trip to the Thetford Center Church (5 miles (8 km), essentially an all-day outing at the time), and the definitive separation of church and state in the 1810s freed them from tax obligations to that church.

== See also ==
- National Register of Historic Places listings in Orange County, Vermont
