= Thetford Center Historic District =

Historic district in Vermont, United States

- U.S. National Register of Historic Places
- U.S. Historic district
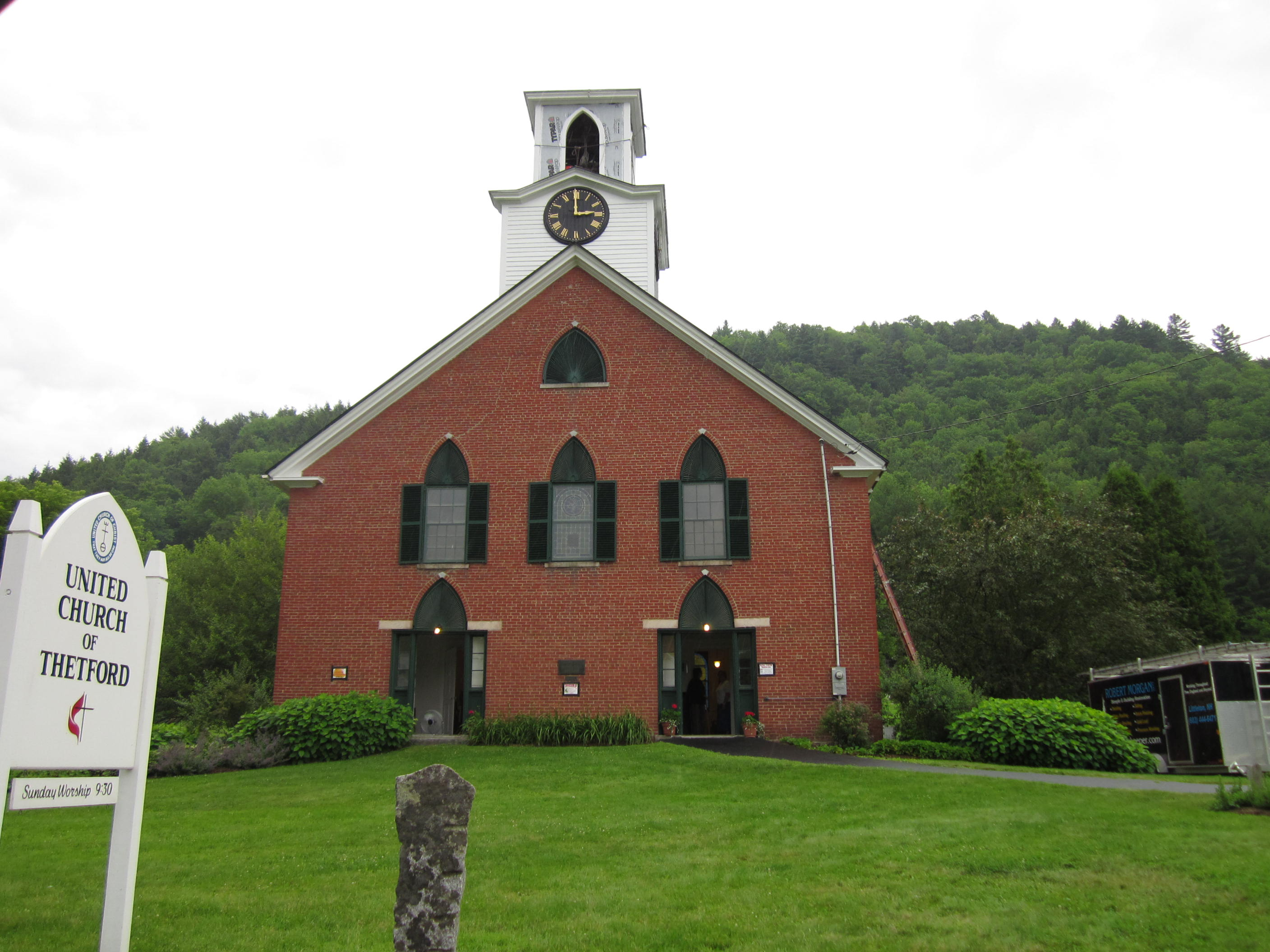

- Location within Vermont Location within the United States
- Location: Roughly along VT 113, Tucker Hill Rd., and Buzzell Bridge Rd., Thetford, Vermont
- Coordinates: 43°49′58″N 72°14′52″W
- Area: 375 acres (152 ha)
- Built: 1793
- Built by: Porter, Hezekiah
- Architectural style: Federal, Greek Revival, Italianate
- NRHP reference No.: 98000220
- Added to NRHP: March 5, 1998

The Thetford Center Historic District encompasses the village of Thetford Center in Thetford, Vermont. The village contains a well-preserved collection of early to mid-19th century architecture, a legacy of its period of greatest prosperity as an agricultural and industrial center. It was listed on the National Register of Historic Places in 1998.

== Description and history ==
The town of Thetford was chartered in 1761 by Benning Wentworth, governor of the Province of New Hampshire. What is now known as Thetford Center began as a sawmill and gristmill on the Ompompanoosuc River in 1772. The village grew in the first half of the 19th century as a predominantly industrial village, producing textiles and strawboard, made with scrap paper remnants. Later in the 19th century wood product factories benefited from the area's water power. Most of its remaining waterfront industries were condemned in the 1950s as part of a flood control project, leaving a predominantly residential, commercial, and civic village.

The historic district is mostly arrayed on Vermont Route 113 between Tucker Hill Road and Buzzell Bridge Road. It extends some way along both of those roads, running on Tucker Hill Road to the Thetford Center Covered Bridge. Most of the village's buildings were built between 1800 and 1880, and reflect the Federal, Greek Revival, and Italianate styles popular in the time period. Prominent buildings include the Hezekiah Porter House, at the northwest corner of VT 113 and Tucker Hill Road, a fine Federal period brick house, and the Gothic Revival Methodist Church. The district also includes surviving elements of the village's industrial past, which primarily consist of dams and foundations of mills along the Ompompanoosuc River.

== See also ==
- National Register of Historic Places listings in Orange County, Vermont
