= T. H. Chubb Fishing Rod Factory =

Factory in Vermont, US, 1869 to 1990s

The T. H. Chubb Fishing Rod Factory was a fishing rod factory in Post Mills, an unincorporated community in the Town of Thetford, Orange County, Vermont, United States. By the late nineteenth and into the early twentieth century, it was the largest fishing rod factory in America. By the late 1930s, the factory was taken over by the Malmquist Wood Products Company. The factory closed in the 1990s, remained abandoned for years, and was eventually torn down in 2010.

== History ==
The Chubb Fish[ing] Rod Factory was established in 1869, on the site of a former linseed oil factory on the Ompompanoosuc River, in the village of Post Mills.

Founded by Captain Thomas H. Chubb, formerly of Galveston, Texas, the story of the fishing rod factory provides insight into the Gilded Age in Vermont, but it is an atypical story as well.

=== Thomas H. Chubb ===
Thomas Henry Chubb was born in Charlestown, Massachusetts in 1836. Soon after, his family relocated to Galveston, TX, where his father, also Thomas, became involved in Texas' quest for independence from Mexico. The senior Thomas was a sailor, having gone to sea as a young boy. He worked his way up the ranks of sailing and shipbuilding, and in 1860, just prior to the outbreak of the Civil War, Chubb captained a vessel known as The Royal Yacht, one of the first ships pressed into Confederate service to protect the southern coastline.

Chubb graduated from Baylor University, and in 1859 married Isabel Mason. He served in the Confederate navy during the Civil War. After the war, Chubb moved to Vermont and along with a partner purchased a factory and produced rake and shovels handles. After this venture failed, Chubb bought out his partner and started manufacturing split bamboo fishing rods. As his business grew, Chubb put out a catalog offering a complete line of fishing tackle.

Around 1885, Chubb built and added the "Henshall Van Antwerp" reel to his fishing tackle line-up. Over the years, Chubb produced three different versions of the "Henshall Van Antwerp" reel.

=== The Factory Post-Thomas Chubb ===
In 1891, the factory burned down. Later that year, Chubb sold the business to Montague City Rod Co., who changed the company name from "Thos. H. Chubb" to "T.G. Chubb Rod Co." Historically, the company is considered one of the great reel makers the New England area.
