= Thetford Hill Historic District =

Historic district in Vermont, United States

- U.S. National Register of Historic Places
- U.S. Historic district
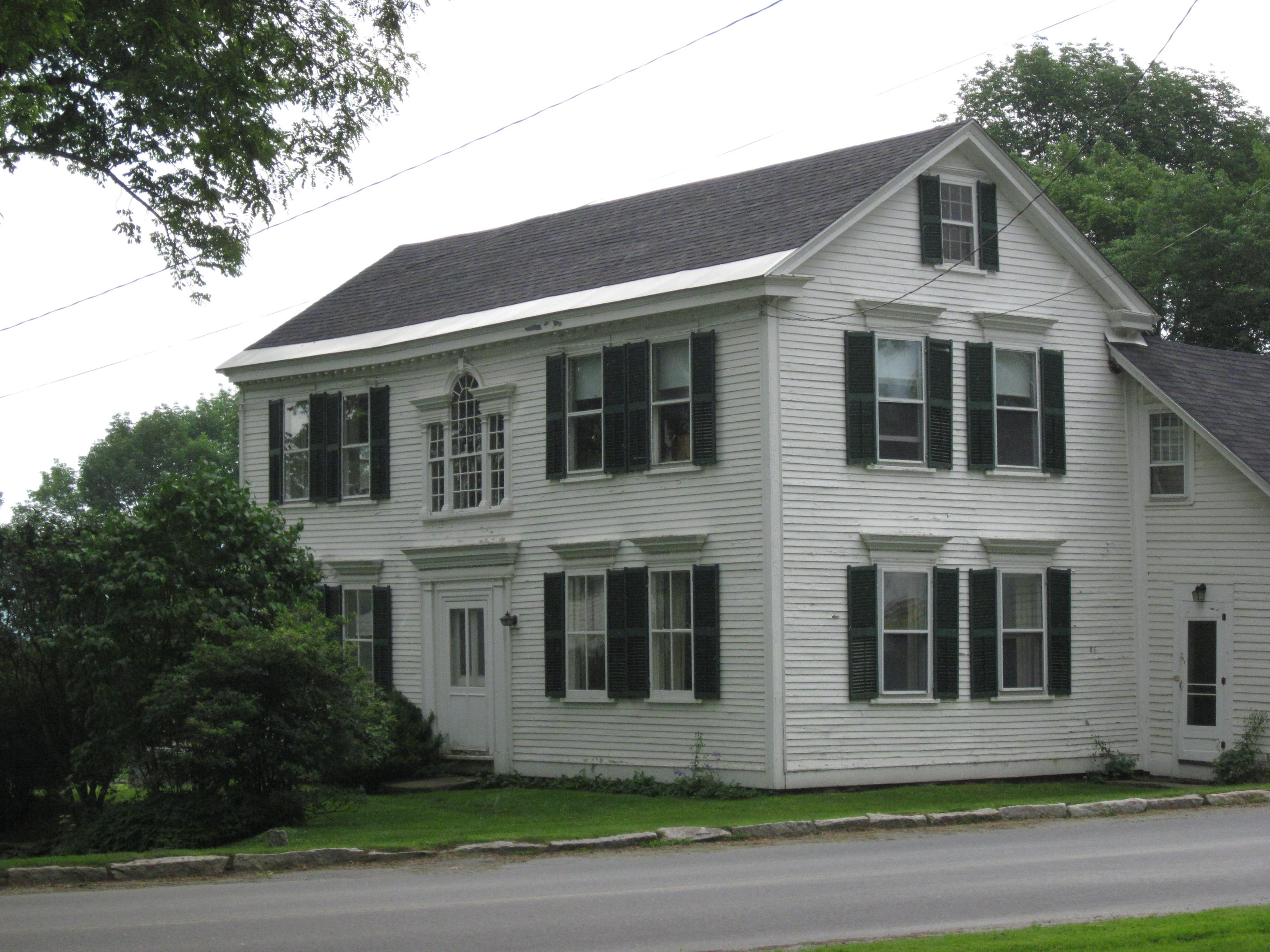

- Location within Vermont Location within the United States
- Location: Roughly Rt. 113 and Academy Rd., Thetford, Vermont
- Coordinates: 43°49′1″N 72°13′44″W
- Area: 25 acres (10 ha)
- Architect: Turner, Joshua; Et al.
- Architectural style: Mid 19th Century Revival, Federal, Federal
- NRHP reference No.: 88002134
- Added to NRHP: October 27, 1988

The Thetford Hill Historic District encompasses the well-preserved 19th-century village center of Thetford Hill in Thetford, Vermont. Developed between 1792 and about 1860 and located at what is now the junction of Vermont Route 113 and Academy Road, it includes mainly residential buildings, as well as several buildings of Thetford Academy and the 1785-88 Thetford Meetinghouse, one of the state's oldest churches in continuous use. The district was listed on the National Register of Historic Places in 1988.

== Description and history ==
The village of Thetford Hill, set at the junction of Vermont 113 and Academy Road, has its beginning in the construction (between 1785 and 1788) of the town meetinghouse, which was originally located on the town common just to the south. It was moved off the common in 1830 (as part of the separation of church and state) and given its present Greek Revival temple front. Growth of the village was initially limited, but was stimulated by the founding in 1819 of Thetford Academy, the state's oldest secondary school. The school's present buildings are built in a Colonial Revival style, and date from after 1942, the year a fire destroyed its 19th-century buildings. The village saw virtually no growth from 1860 until the mid-20th century, from which point additions to its architectural inventory have been sympathetic to its 19th-century heritage.

The historic district extends east along Vermont 113 and south along Academy Road from their junction, and extends a short way west on Route 113 and north on Houghton Hill Road, which runs north from the junction. The town green is at the southwest corner, and the church, the village's focal point, is across Route 113 to the north. The Thetford Academy campus is at the southern end of the district, abutting Thetford Hill State Park. while the district's eastern boundary is at Garey Road. Most of the buildings are residential in character, one to 2 1/2 stories in height, and of wood-frame construction, although there are some brick buildings. The Greek Revival and Federal styles are those most commonly seen.

== See also ==
- National Register of Historic Places listings in Orange County, Vermont
