= Vermont Route 244 =

State highway in Orange County, Vermont, US

Vermont Route 244
- VT 244 highlighted in red

Route information
- Maintained by VTrans
- Length: 5.640 mi (9.077 km)

Major junctions
- West end: VT 113 in Thetford
- East end: US 5 in Fairlee

Location
- Country: United States
- State: Vermont
- Counties: Orange

Highway system
- State highways in Vermont
| ← VT 243 | → VT 253 |

Vermont Route 244 (VT 244) is a state highway located within Orange County, Vermont, United States. The route runs from VT 113 in Thetford to U.S. Route 5 (US 5) in Fairlee. The highway is 5.640 miles (9.077 km) long and provides access to the Post Mills Airport from Interstate 91 (I-91) and US 5. VT 244 passes through the towns of Thetford, West Fairlee, and Fairlee, as well as the village of Post Mills.

== Route description ==
Vermont Route 244 begins at an intersection with Vermont Route 113 in the village of Post Mills, within the town of Thetford. The highway traverses the shoreline of Lake Fairlee, traveling north through West Fairlee and Fairlee before turning southeast, crossing under Interstate 91 and terminating at an intersection with U.S. Route 5.

== Major intersections ==
The entire route is in Orange County.

| Location | mi | km | Destinations | Notes |
|---|---|---|---|---|
| Thetford | 0.000 | 0.000 | VT 113 – Thetford Center, East Thetford, West Fairlee, Chelsea | Western terminus |
| Fairlee | 5.640 | 9.077 | US 5 – Fairlee, Bradford, Ely, Norwich | Eastern terminus |
1.000 mi = 1.609 km; 1.000 km = 0.621 mi
