= Camp Billings =

- U.S. National Register of Historic Places
- U.S. Historic district
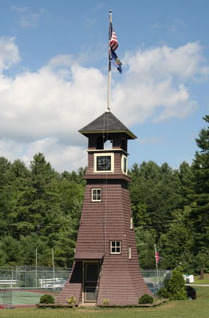
- Camp Billings clocktower

- Location within Vermont Location within the United States
- Location: 1452 VT 244, Thetford, Vermont
- Coordinates: 43°53′25″N 72°13′58″W
- Area: 10.8 acres (4.4 ha)
- Built: 1906
- Architectural style: Bungalow/Craftsman, Adirondack Rustic
- MPS: Organized Summer Camping in Vermont MPS
- NRHP reference No.: 05001524
- Added to NRHP: January 11, 2006

Camp Billings is a co-ed, summer camp on Lake Fairlee in West Fairlee and Thetford, Vermont, United States. Accredited by the American Camp Association, it was established in 1906, and is open by boys and girls between the ages of eight and sixteen. In 2006, it was listed as a historic district on the National Register of Historic Places.

== Activities ==
Camp activities include sailing, backpacking, boating, canoeing, windsurfing, swimming, snorkeling, diving, water sports, music, paddleboarding, tennis, arts and crafts, archery, waterskiing, teen club, junior program, fishing, ropes (zip lining, the infamous Holy Cow Swing, etc.), and drama. The camp also offers canoeing and backpacking trips, either during the day, or overnight.

== History ==
Camp Billings was founded in 1906 under the sponsorship of the local YMCA district by Dr. Garnder Cobb and Julia Billings, wife of businessman and conservationist Frederick Billings of Woodstock, Vermont. The land was first leased, and then purchased for the camp by members of the Billings family. It is believed to be the second-oldest active summer camp in the state. The camp saw significant growth through the 1920s, and continued its growth after lean years of the Great Depression and World War II. In 1957, its first director, Archibald Hurd, retired, creating a gap that was temporarily filled by volunteer alumni and staff. He was replaced by Ralph Lawrence who was director until 1995. John and Anne Freitas were directors from 1996 to 2000 and Bob Green was the Director from 2001 to 2018. A metal plate on the clock tower at the camp reads: “ Bob was Roasted here- July 29, 2018 “. Anne and Sean Collins are the current directors. Anne and Sean Collins are both educators who have themselves spent decades at Billings. Both were campers during the 1990s before joining the staff. Ann ran the office for many years, while Sean served as CIT director where he trained staff for nearly a decade. The camp has continued to grow, and is now managed by a non-profit organization no longer affiliated with the YMCA.

== See also ==
- National Register of Historic Places listings in Orange County, Vermont
