= List of surviving Link Trainers =

Of the more than 10,000 Link Trainers manufactured and sold worldwide, over 160 are known to be still in existence.

== Australia ==
At least 22 AN-T-18 trainers survive in Australia, in various states of repair. A number of these are in museums, but the majority are in the custody of the Australian Air Force Cadets, who were given them in the 1950s by the Royal Australian Air Force (RAAF). They were maintained until 1975 by the RAAF, and as a result many are still in relatively good condition, being either fully or partially operational. The number of operational AN-T-18s has been boosted in recent years by the restoration of several machines.

- One is on display with 600 (Aviation Training) Squadron of the Australian Air Force Cadets in Adelaide, South Australia.
- One is on display at the Aviation Heritage Museum in Bull Creek, Western Australia.
- Two are on display at the Nhill Aviation Heritage Centre in Nhill, Victoria.
- A D4 is on display at the Queensland Air Museum in Caloundra, Queensland.
- One is on display at the RAAF Museum in Point Cook, Victoria.
- One is on display at the South Australian Aviation Museum in Port Adelaide, South Australia.
- A D4 is on display at the B-24 Liberator Memorial in Werribee, Victoria.
- One is in storage at the Australian War Memorial in Campbell, Australian Capital Territory.
- One is in storage with Museums Victoria in Melbourne.
- AT5/2034 – D4 Mk. II in storage at the Museum of Applied Arts & Sciences in Sydney.

== Belgium ==
- One is on display at the Stampe and Vertongen Museum in Antwerp.

== Canada ==
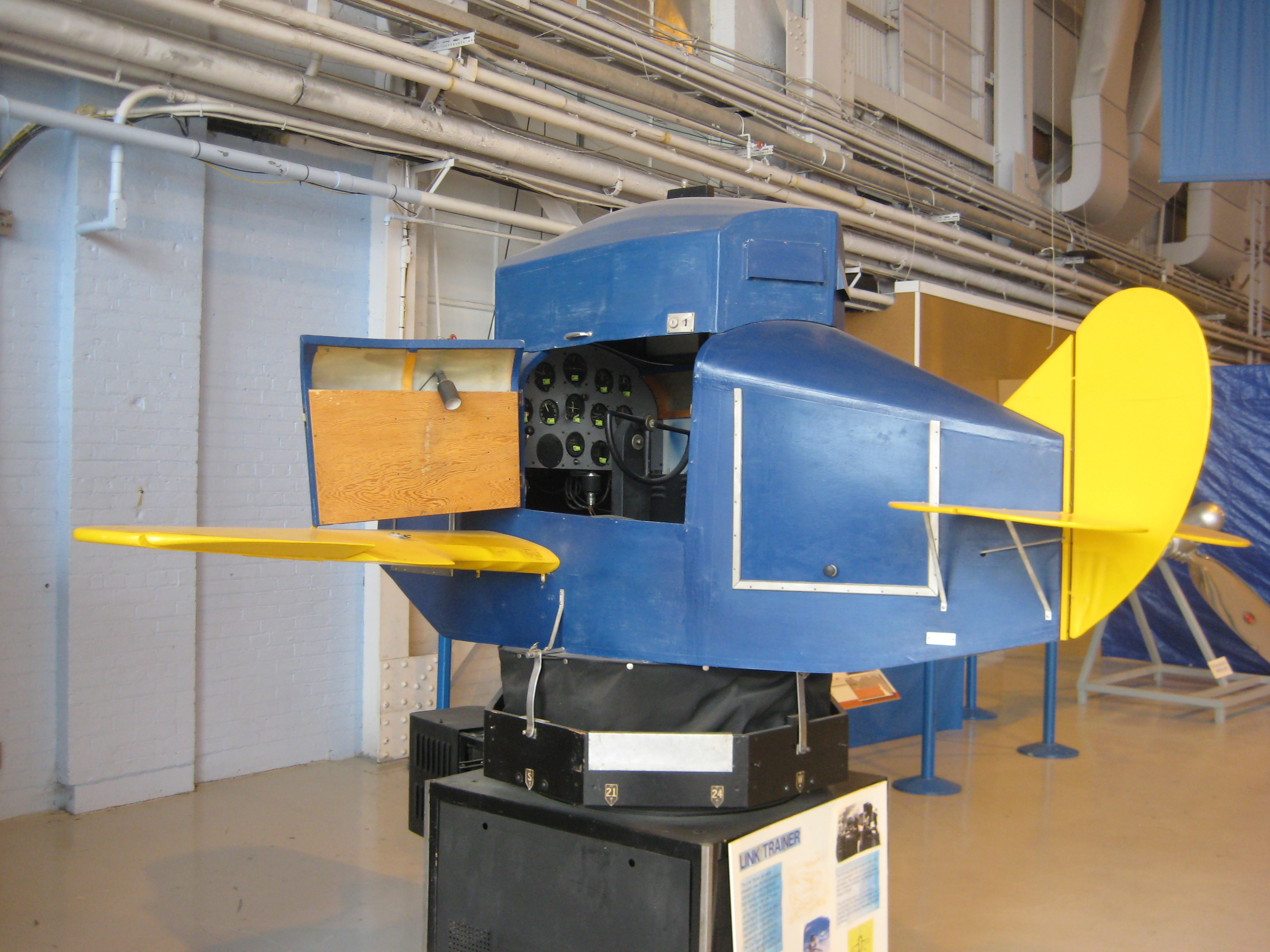
Link Trainer at the Western Canada Aviation Museum

- One is on display at the 1000 Islands History Museum in Gananoque, Ontario.
- One is on display with the Canadian Harvard Aircraft Association in Tillsonburg, Ontario.
- One is on display at the Canadian Aviation Museum in Windsor, Ontario.
- One is in storage at the Canadian Air and Space Museum in Toronto.
- One is on display at the Western Canada Aviation Museum in Winnipeg, Manitoba.
- One is on display at the Reynolds-Alberta Museum in Wetaskiwin, Alberta.
- One is on display at the Bomber Command Museum of Canada in Nanton, Alberta.
- One is on display at the British Columbia Aviation Museum in Sidney, British Columbia.
- One is on display at the Canadian Bushplane Heritage Centre in Sault Ste. Marie, Ontario.
- One is on display at the Canadian War Museum in Ottawa, Ontario.
- One is on display at the Commonwealth Air Training Plan Museum in Brandon, Manitoba.
- One is under restoration at the Comox Air Force Museum in Comox, British Columbia.
- One is on display at the North Atlantic Aviation Museum in Gander, Newfoundland.
- One is on display at the Claresholm Museum in Claresholm, Alberta.
- One is on display at the No. 6 RCAF Dunnville Museum in Dunnville, Ontario.
- One is on display at The Hangar Flight Museum in Calgary, Alberta.
- Two are on display at the Canadian Museum of Flight in Langley, British Columbia.
- Three are on display at the Alberta Aviation Museum in Edmonton, Alberta.

== Czech Republic ==
- 11240 – Link D.2 Trainer on display at the Prague Aviation Museum in Prague.

== Finland ==
- One is on display at the Finnish Aviation Museum in Vantaa, Uusimaa.

== Ireland ==
- One is on display at the Irish Air Corps Museum in Baldonnel, County Dublin.

== Luxembourg ==
- One is on display at the 385th Bomb Group Memorial Museum in Perlé, Redange.

== Netherlands ==
- One is on display at the Aviodrome in Lelystad, Flevoland. It is marked as PH-UBZ.
- One is on display at the Luchtvaart- & Oorlogsmuseum on Texel International Airport in Texel, Noord-Holland. It is marked as PH-TEE

== New Zealand ==
- One is on display at the Ashburton Aviation Museum in Ashburton, Canterbury.
- One is on display at the Museum of Transport and Technology in Western Springs, Auckland. It includes the instructor's station.
- A Model D4 is under restoration with the New Zealand Warbirds Association in Manurewa, Auckland. It includes the instructor's station.

== Malta ==
- One is on display at the Malta Aviation Museum in Ta' Qali, Attard.

== Portugal ==
- One is on display at the Museu do Ar near Pero Pinheiro, Sintra. It was previously used by TAP Portugal.

== Serbia ==
- One is on display at the Museum of Aviation in Surčin, Belgrade.
- One is on display at the Aeroklub Valjevo in Valjevo, Kolubara.

== South Africa ==
- One is in storage at the South African Airways Museum Society in Germiston, Gauteng.

== Sri Lanka ==
- A D4 is on display at the Sri Lanka Air Force Museum in Ratmalana, Colombo. This trainer was in service with the Royal Ceylon Air Force.

== Spain ==
- One is on display at the Fundación Infante de Orleans in Madrid.

== Sweden ==
- One is on display at the Västerås Flygmuseum in Västerås, Västmanland.
- An ANT-18 is on display at the Arboga Missile Museum in Arboga, Västmanland.

== United Kingdom ==
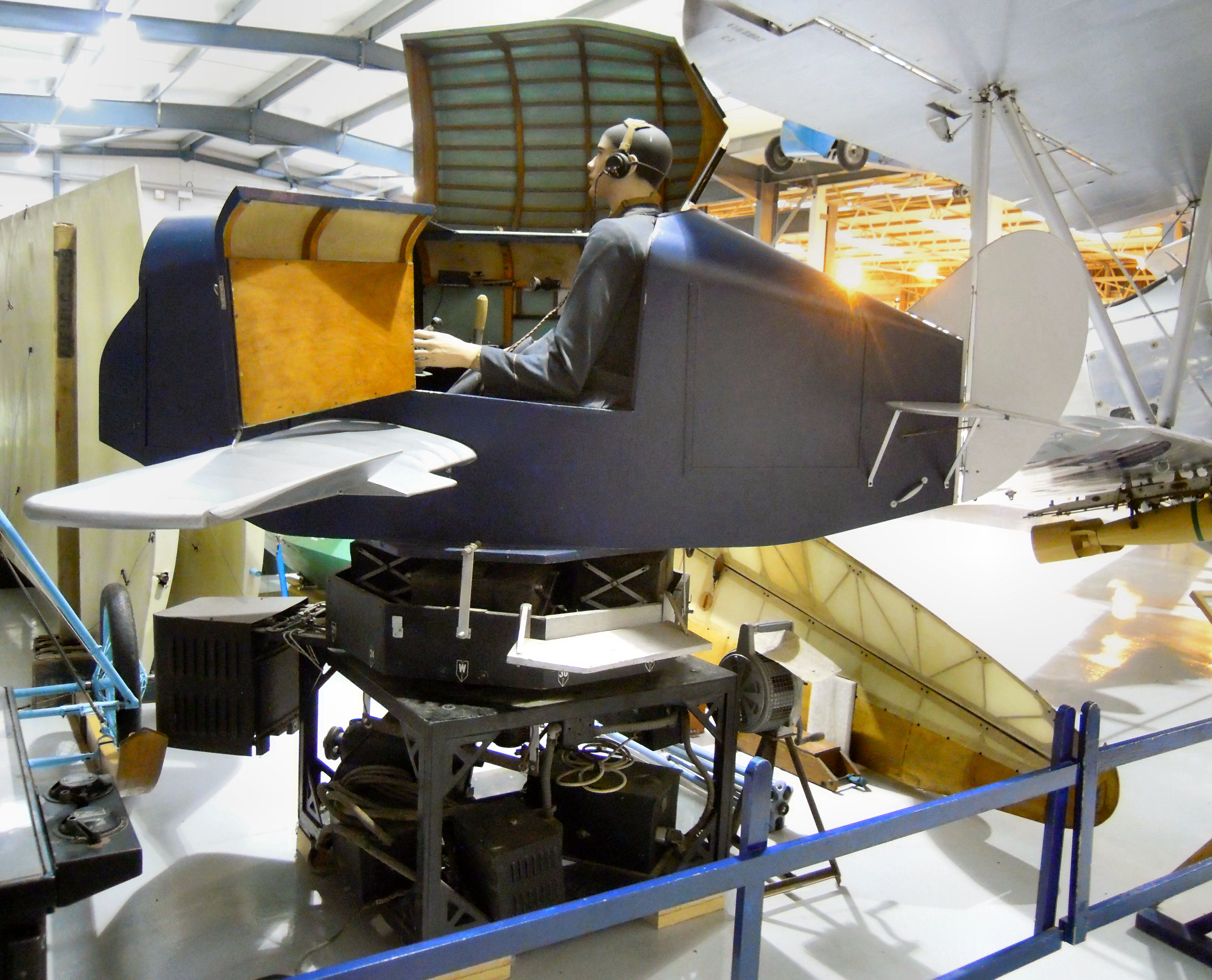
The Link Trainer at the Shuttleworth Collection in the UK

- A D4 is on display at the Imperial War Museum Duxford in Duxford, Cambridgeshire.
- One is in storage at the Brooklands Museum in Weybridge, Surrey.
- One is on display at the 100th Bomb Group Memorial Museum in Diss, Norfolk.
- A D4 is on display at the Boscombe Down Aviation Collection near Salisbury, Wiltshire.
- One is on display at the City of Norwich Aviation Museum in Horsham St Faith, Norfolk.
- One is on display at the de Havilland Aircraft Museum at London Colney, Hertfordshire.
- One is on display at the East Midlands Aeropark in Castle Donington, Leicestershire.
- One is on display at the Montrose Air Station Heritage Centre in Montrose, Angus.
- One is on display at the North East Land, Sea and Air Museums in Sunderland, Tyne and Wear.
- One is on display with the Ridgeway Military and Aviation Research Group at RAF Welford in Welford, Berkshire.
- One is on display at the Sywell Aviation Museum in Northampton, Northamptonshire.
- One is on display at the Tangmere Military Aviation Museum in Chichester, West Sussex.
- One is on display at the Wings Museum near Balcombe, West Sussex.
- Two are on display at Wellingborough School in Wellingborough, Northamptonshire. One uses the fuselage of a link trainer and has been converted to run a computer simulator.
- Three are on display at the Trenchard Museum at RAF Halton in Halton, Buckinghamshire.
- Four are on display at the Norfolk and Suffolk Aviation Museum in Flixton, Suffolk.
- Two are on display at the RAF Manston History Museum in Manston, Kent, with one in working order.
- One is on display with No. 130 (Bournemouth) Squadron of the Air Training Corps in Boscombe, Dorset.
- One is on display with No. 195 (Grimsby) Squadron of the Air Training Corps in Grimsby, Lincolnshire.
- One is on display with No. 328 (Kingston) Squadron of the Air Training Corps in Kingston upon Thames, London.
- One is on display with No. 424 (Southampton) Squadron of the Air Training Corps in Southampton, Hampshire.
- One is on display with No. 1063 (Herne Bay) Squadron of the Air Training Corps in Herne Bay, Kent.
- One is on display with No. 1349 (Woking) Squadron of the Air Training Corps in Woking, Surrey.
- One is on display at the Caernarfon Airworld Aviation Museum in Caernarfon, Gwynedd.
- One is on display at the Gatwick Aviation Museum in Charlwood, Surrey.
- One is on display at the Jet Age Museum in Staverton, Gloucestershire.
- One is on display at the Newark Air Museum in Winthorpe, Nottinghamshire.
- One is on display at the Shuttleworth Collection in Old Warden, Bedfordshire.
- One is on display at the Brenzett Aeronautical Museum in Brenzett, Kent.
- One is on display at Rochester Airport in Rochester, Kent.
- One is on display at the Romney Marsh Wartime Collection in Brenzett.

== United States ==
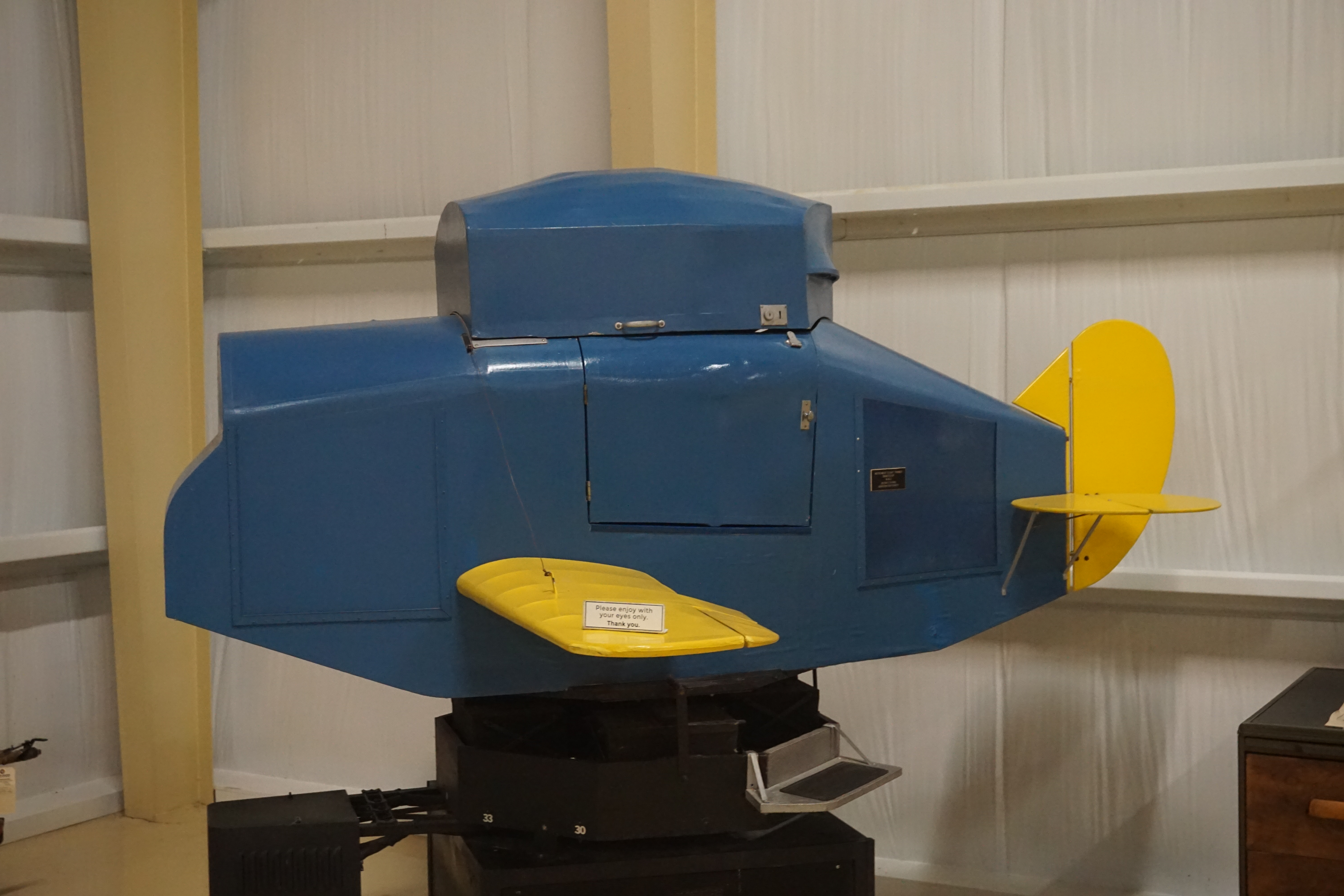
A Link Trainer on display at the Air Zoo

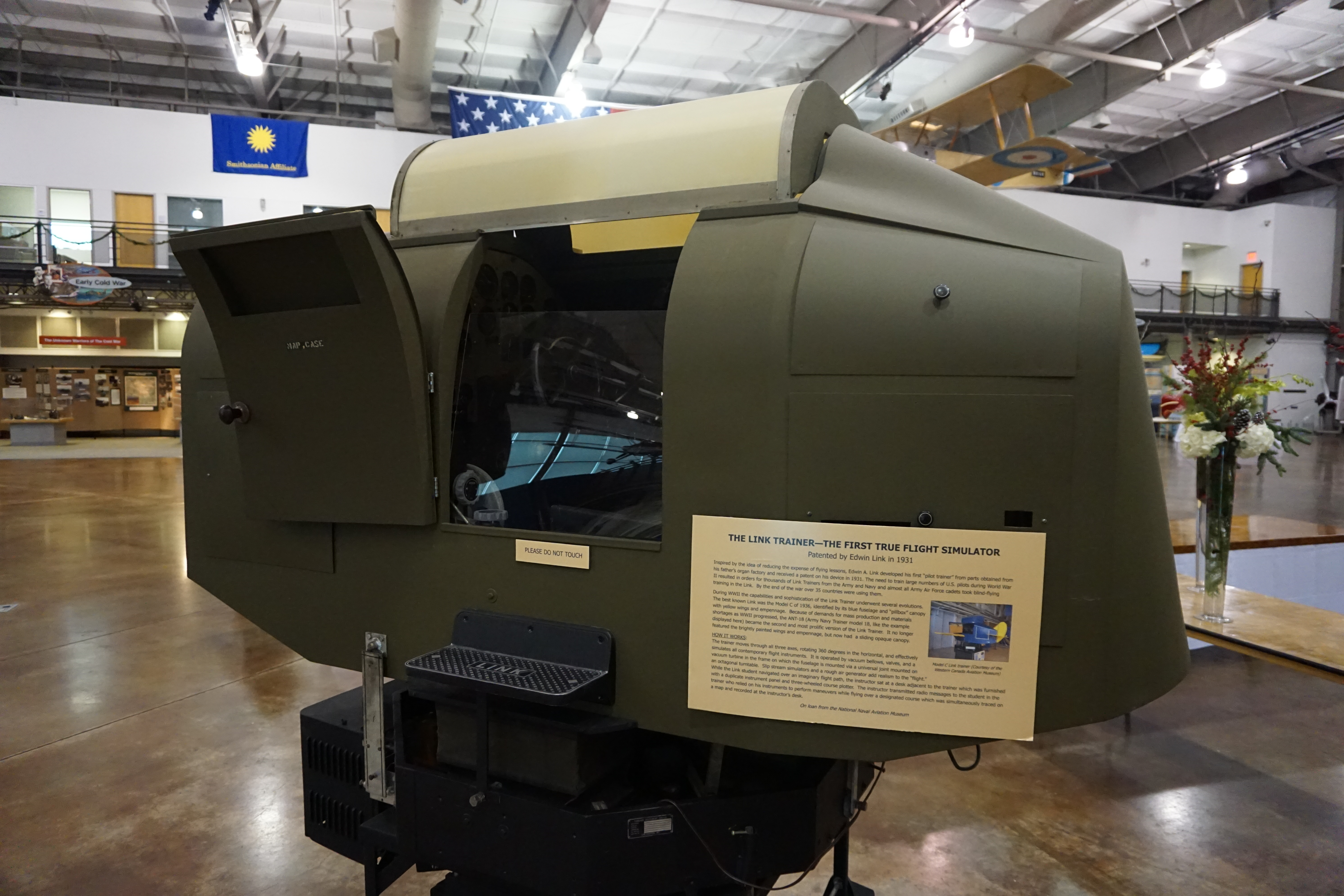
A Link Trainer on display at the Frontiers of Flight Museum

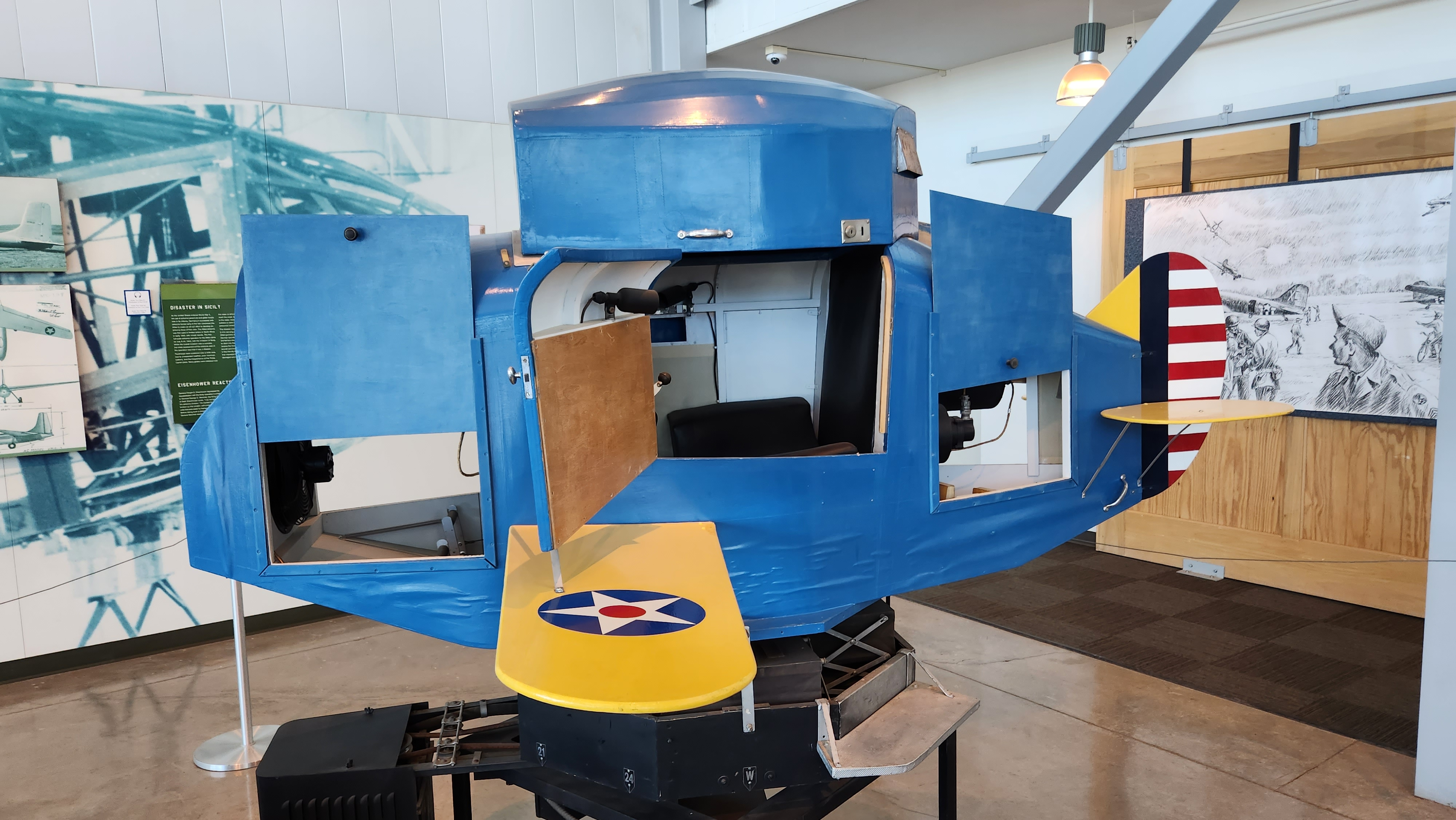
A Link Trainer on display at the Silent Wings Museum

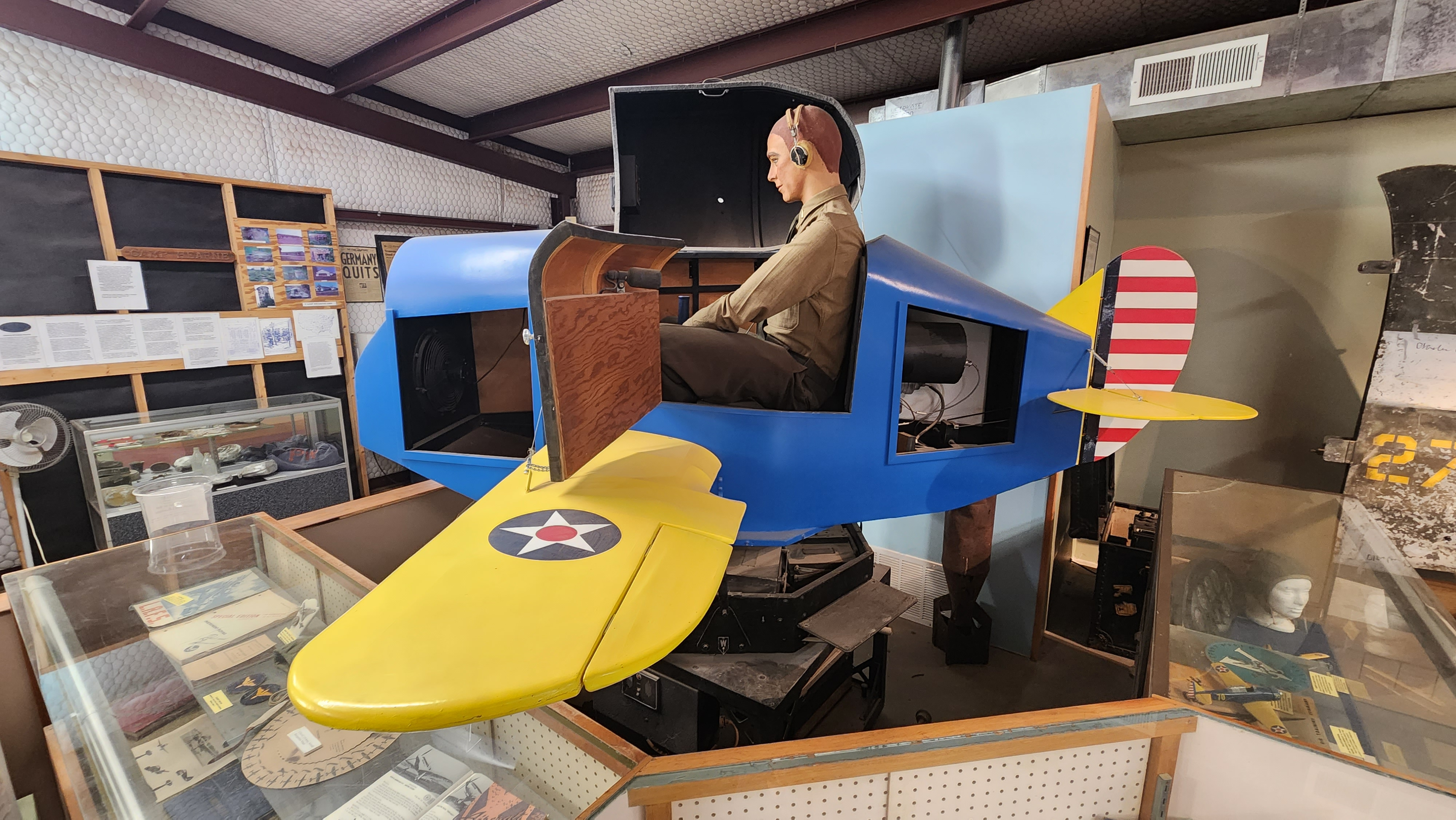
A Link Trainer on display at the Texas Air Museum

- One is on display at the Fagen Fighters WWII Museum in Granite Falls, Minnesota. It includes the instructor's station.
- One is on display at the Wings of Eagles Discovery Center in Horseheads, New York.
- One in on display at Randolph Air Force Base in Universal City, Texas.
- One is on display at CAE Dallas in Dallas, Texas.
- One is on display at the United Airlines Flight Training Center in Denver, Colorado.
- One is on display at the Greater Binghamton Airport in Binghamton, New York.
- One is on display at the Niagara Aerospace Museum in Niagara Falls, New York.
- One in on display at the Post Mills Airport in Post Mills, Vermont.
- One is on display at the British Flight Training School No. 1 Museum in Terrell, Texas. It includes the instructor's station.
- One is on display at the CAF Airpower Museum in Dallas, Texas.
- One is on display at the Cavanaugh Flight Museum in Addison, Texas.
- A GAT-1 is on display at the College Park Aviation Museum in College Park, Maryland. It was previously owned by the University of Maryland's Aerospace Engineering Department.
- One is on display at the Evergreen Aviation & Space Museum in McMinnville, Oregon.
- One is on display at the National Museum of World War II Aviation in Colorado Springs, Colorado. It includes the instructor's station.
- One is on display at the Naval Air Station Wildwood Aviation Museum in Rio Grande, New Jersey.
- One is on display at the North Carolina Aviation Museum and Hall of Fame in Asheboro, North Carolina.
- One is on display at the Palm Springs Air Museum in Palm Springs, California.
- One is on display at the San Diego Air & Space Museum in San Diego, California.
- One is on display at the Shannon Air Museum in Fredericksburg, Virginia.
- One is on display at the Southern Museum of Flight in Birmingham, Alabama.
- One is on display at the Silent Wings Museum in Lubbock, Texas. It includes the instructor's station.
- A model C-3 is under restoration at the Regional Military Museum in Houma, Louisiana.
- One is on display at the United States Army Aviation Museum at Fort Rucker near Ozark, Alabama. It was added to their collection in 2006.
- One is on display at the USS Lexington Museum on the Bay in Corpus Christi, Texas.
- One is on display at the Western Antique Aeroplane & Automobile Museum in Hood River, Oregon.
- One is on display at the Wings of the North Air Museum in Eden Prairie, Minnesota. It was restored by Air Corps Aviation.
- One is on display at Melbourne Orlando International Airport in Melbourne, Florida.
- One is on display in the Harris Corporation Atrium of the Engineering II building at the University of Central Florida in Orlando, Florida.
- One is on display at the Roberson Museum and Science Center in Binghamton, New York. It is part of an exhibit about Edwin Link and is in a typical classroom setting.
- One is on display at the Milton J. Rubenstein Museum of Science and Technology in Syracuse, New York.
- One is on display at the American Treasure Tour in Oaks, Pennsylvania.
- One is on display at the Airpower Museum in Ottumwa, Iowa.
- One is on display at the Castle Air Museum in Atwater, California.
- One is on display at the Chico Air Museum in Chico, California.
- One is on display at the EAA Aviation Museum in Oshkosh, Wisconsin.
- One is on display at the Empire State Aerosciences Museum in Glenville, New York.
- One is on display at the Estrella Warbirds Museum in Paso Robles, California.
- One is on display at the Heritage Flight Museum in Burlington, Washington.
- One is on display at the Hill Aerospace Museum in Roy, Utah.
- One is on display at the Hiller Aviation Museum in San Carlos, California.
- One is on display at the Illinois Aviation Museum in Bolingbrook, Illinois.
- One is on display at the Iowa Aviation Heritage Museum in Ankeny, Iowa.
- One is on display at the MAPS Air Museum in North Canton, Ohio.
- One is on display at the MAAPS Military Museum in Malden, Missouri.
- A model C-3 is on display at the Military Aviation Museum in Virginia Beach, Virginia.
- One is on display at the Minnesota Air National Guard Museum in St. Paul, Minnesota.
- One is on display at the Minter Field Air Museum in Shafter, California.
- One is on display at the Moffett Field Museum in Mountain View, California. It includes the instructor's station and was previously on display at NASA's Ames Research Center.
- One is on display at the Museum of Aviation at Robins Air Force Base near Warner Robins, Georgia.
- One is on display at the National Museum of Naval Aviation in Pensacola, Florida.
- One is on display at the National Museum of the United States Air Force in Dayton, Ohio.
- One is on display at the Naval Air Station Fort Lauderdale Museum in Fort Lauderdale, Florida. It is located in Link Trainer Building No. 8.
- One is on display at the Navy Simulation Museum in Sands Point, New York.
- One is on display at the National Warplane Museum in Geneseo, New York.
- One is on display at the Port Townsend Aero Museum in Port Townsend, Washington.
- One is on display at the Prairie Aviation Museum in Bloomington, Illinois. It includes the instructor's station.
- One is on display at the Selfridge Military Air Museum at Selfridge Air National Guard Base in Mount Clemens, Michigan. In addition, the museum has also built a replica.
- One is on display at the Texas Air Museum in Slaton, Texas.
- One is on display at the Travis Air Force Base Heritage Center at Travis Air Force Base in Fairfield, California.
- One is on display at the Tri-State Warbird Museum in Batavia, Ohio. It includes the instructor's station.
- One is on display at the Tuskegee Airmen National Historic Site in Tuskegee, Alabama. It consists of only the body of the trainer.
- One is on display at the Valiant Air Command Warbird Museum in Titusville, Florida. It includes the instructor's station.
- One is on display at the War Eagles Air Museum in Santa Teresa, New Mexico.
- One is on display at the Warhawk Air Museum in Nampa, Idaho.
- One is on display at the Western Museum of Flight in Torrance, California.
- One is on display at the Wings Over the Rockies Air and Space Museum in Denver, Colorado.
- One is on display at the Hamilton Field History Museum in Novato, California.
- One is on display at the World War II Flight Training Museum in Douglas, Georgia.
- One is on display at the Yankee Air Museum in Ypsilanti, Michigan.
- One is on display at The International Museum of World War II in Natick, Massachusetts.
- One is on display at the Daytona Beach Campus of Embry-Riddle Aeronautical University in Daytona Beach, Florida.
- One is in storage with the Carlsbad Army Airfield Museum in Carlsbad, New Mexico.
- One is in storage with the Quonset Air Museum in North Kingstown, Rhode Island.
- One is on display with the Minnesota Wing of the Commemorative Air Force in South St. Paul, Minnesota.
- One is on display with the Rocky Mountain Wing of the Commemorative Air Force in Grand Junction, Colorado.
- One is on display with Airbase Arizona of the Commemorative Air Force in Mesa, Arizona.
- One is under restoration at the Honor Point Military & Aerospace Museum in Spokane, Washington.
- One is under restoration with the Dixie Wing of the Commemorative Air Force in Peachtree City, Georgia.
- One is under restoration with the Lobo Wing of the Commemorative Air Force in Moriarty, New Mexico.
- One is on display at the Delta Flight Museum in Atlanta, Georgia, with a second, partially restored one in storage.
- Two are on display at the Combat Air Museum in Topeka, Kansas. One is a BIT-45/1-CA-1 that has been converted for helicopter flight training.
- Two are on display at the Glenn H. Curtiss Museum in Hammondsport, New York.
- Two are on display at the Greater Saint Louis Air & Space Museum in Cahokia, Illinois.
- Two are on display at the Millville Army Air Field Museum in Millville, New Jersey.
- Two are on display at the Museum of Flight restoration facility at Paine Field near Seattle, Washington. One includes the instructor's station.
- Two are on under restoration at the Pendleton Air Museum in Pendleton, Oregon.
- A GAT-1 and another model are on display at the CT&I Techworks! in Binghamton, New York.
- A model C-3 and a GAT-1 general aviation trainer are on display at the Air Victory Museum in Lumberton, New Jersey.
- Three are on display at the L3Harris Link Training and Simulation facility in Arlington, Texas.
- A model C, C-3 and C-4 are on display at the Mid-Atlantic Air Museum in Reading, Pennsylvania.
- Five are in storage at the Paul E. Garber Preservation, Restoration, and Storage Facility of the National Air and Space Museum in Suitland, Maryland: including a model AN-T-18, a 1946 "Model F, C-8", a "pilot maker" from 1930, and a modified 1986 GAT-1 general aviation trainer.
