= Lyme–East Thetford Bridge =

- U.S. National Register of Historic Places
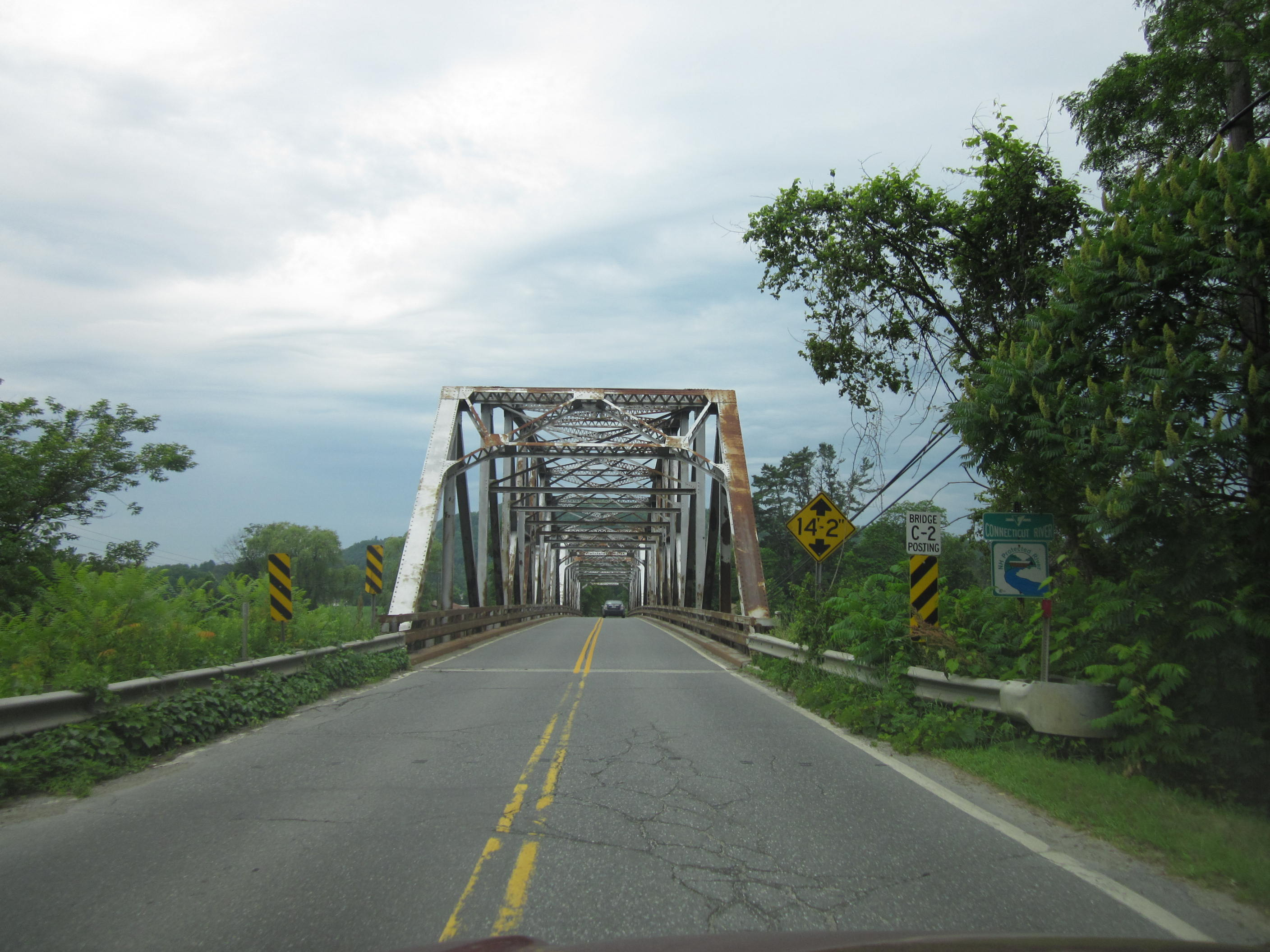
- View from the New Hampshire side

- Location within New Hampshire Location within Vermont Location within the United States
- Location: Connecticut River at Lyme, NH and East Thetford, VT
- Coordinates: 43.812144°N 72.1831°W
- Built: 1937
- NRHP reference No.: 100005159
- Added to NRHP: March 27, 2020

The Lyme–East Thetford Bridge is a historic bridge over the Connecticut River between Lyme, New Hampshire, and East Thetford, Vermont. From the New Hampshire side it carries East Thetford Road, which becomes Vermont Route 113 as it enters Vermont. A Parker truss bridge completed in 1937, it is 471 feet (144 m) long. The bridge was added to the National Register of Historic Places in 2020.

== Description and history ==
The Lyme–East Thetford Bridge is located in a rural setting between the village of East Thetford on the Vermont side and Lyme village 1 mile (1.6 km) to the east in New Hampshire. It consists of two Parker truss spans, set on concrete abutments and a central concrete pier. The trusses are fabricated out of rolled steel I-beams, and the main deck is steel covered by asphalt.

The bridge location was the site of a ferry as early as 1780. A bridge is documented at this site in the 1840s, and a bridge built in the 1890s was destroyed by flooding in 1936. The present bridge was constructed as a replacement for the latter bridge, its abutments and piers built higher as a defense against future flooding. The bridge trusses were fabricated by the American Bridge Company, and it was largely funded by the federal government through the Works Progress Administration. The bridge is fairly typical of truss bridges built in Vermont at the time, and is the longest two-span Parker truss in the state of New Hampshire. It is one of five Parker truss bridges spanning the Connecticut River. The bridge was closed during a rehabilitation project between April 2023 and November 2024.

== See also ==
- List of bridges on the National Register of Historic Places in New Hampshire
- List of bridges on the National Register of Historic Places in Vermont
- National Register of Historic Places listings in Grafton County, New Hampshire
- National Register of Historic Places listings in Orange County, Vermont
- List of crossings of the Connecticut River
