= Thetford Center Covered Bridge =

- U.S. National Register of Historic Places
- U.S. Historic district – Contributing property
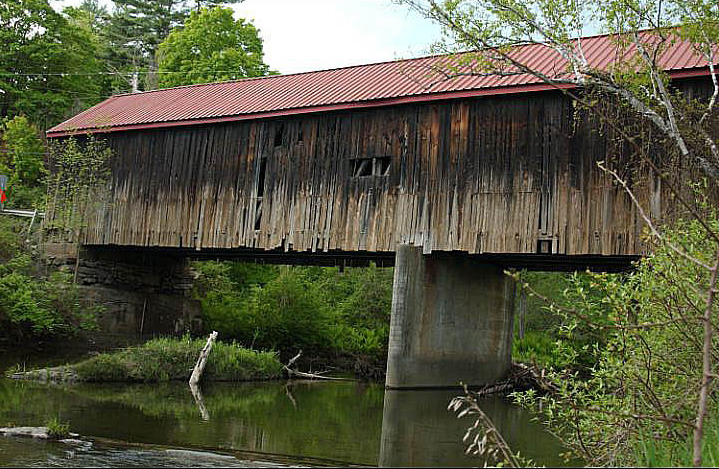

- Location within Vermont Location within the United States
- Location: Tucker Hill Rd. over Ompompanoosuc River, Thetford, Vermont
- Coordinates: 43°49′55″N 72°15′12″W
- Area: 1 acre (0.40 ha)
- Architectural style: Haupt truss bridge
- Part of: Thetford Center Historic District (ID98000220)
- NRHP reference No.: 74000247

Significant dates
- Added to NRHP: September 17, 1974
- Designated CP: March 5, 1998

The Thetford Center Covered Bridge is a historic covered bridge, carrying Tucker Hill Road across the Ompompanoosuc River in Thetford, Vermont. It is the state's only known example of the Haupt patent truss system. It was listed on the National Register of Historic Places in 1974.

== Description and history ==
The Thetford Center Covered Bridge is located a short way west of the village of Thetford Center, spanning the south-flowing Ompompanoosuc River, a tributary of the Connecticut River. The bridge has a span of 128.5 feet (39.2 m), and rests on dry laid stone abutments that have been capped in concrete and a central concrete pier. The bridge is covered by a metal roof and sheathed in vertical board siding. The portal ends project beyond the deck by about 1 foot (0.30 m). The deck is now supported by steel I-beams, and the original bridge trusses support only the bridge superstructure. The bridge has a total width of 20.5 feet (6.2 m), with an 18-foot (5.5 m) wide roadway (one lane). The bridge trusses are a variant of a multiple kingpost truss. Each truss has verticals and diagonals in that style, but is further augmented by a laminated arch, consisting of heavy planks pegged together.

The bridge's construction date is unknown. It is the only example of the Haupt patent truss known in the state, and may be the only example in the northeastern United States. The alterations made to support the deck with I-beams, including capping the abutments and adding the central pier, were made in 1963.

== See also ==
- Union Village Covered Bridge
- List of Vermont covered bridges
- National Register of Historic Places listings in Orange County, Vermont
- List of bridges on the National Register of Historic Places in Vermont
