= Union Village Covered Bridge =

- U.S. National Register of Historic Places
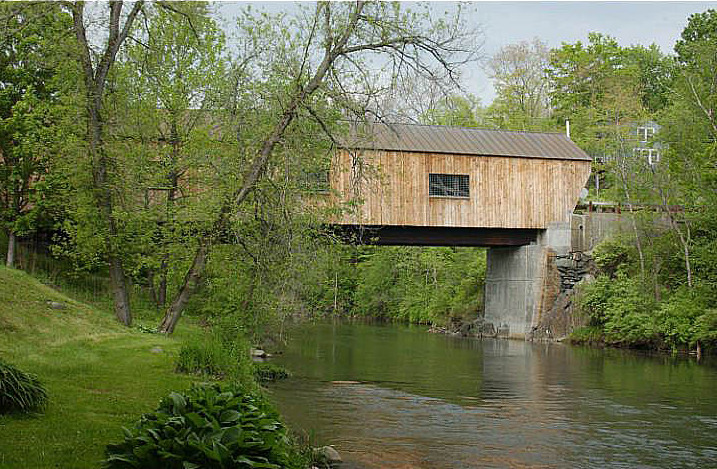

- Location within Vermont Location within the United States
- Location: Over Ompompanoosuc River in Union Village, Thetford, Vermont
- Coordinates: 43°47′19″N 72°15′17″W
- Area: 1 acre (0.40 ha)
- Architectural style: multiple Kingpost truss
- NRHP reference No.: 74000248
- Added to NRHP: September 17, 1974

The Union Village Covered Bridge is a historic covered bridge, carrying Academy Road across the Ompompanoosuc River in Union Village, Thetford, Vermont. Built in 1867, it is the state's longest 19th-century multiple kingpost truss bridge. It was listed on the National Register of Historic Places in 1974.

== Description and history ==
The Union Village Covered Bridge stands in southern Thetford, in rural Union Village, spanning the south-flowing Ompompanoosuc River on Academy Road. It is a single-span multiple kingpost truss structure, 113 feet (34 m) long with portals that flare outward. It rests on original abutments of dry-laid stone that have been faced or capped in concrete. It is 19 feet (5.8 m) wide, with a roadway width of 15 feet (4.6 m) (one lane). The floor supports consist of stringers that have been tie-bolted together, reinforced in the 20th century by the addition of laminated beams to the underside. The exterior is finished in vertical board siding, with square window openings cut into the sides. The roof is made of standing seam metal.

The bridge was built in 1867, and is one of two surviving 19th-century covered bridges in Thetford; the other is the Thetford Center Covered Bridge. The bridge underwent a major rehabilitation in 2002–2003. It is the state's longest multiple kingpost truss bridge.

== See also ==
- Thetford Center Covered Bridge
- National Register of Historic Places listings in Orange County, Vermont
- List of Vermont covered bridges
- List of bridges on the National Register of Historic Places in Vermont
