= Union Village, Vermont =

Village in Vermont, U.S.

Coordinates: 43°47′19″N 72°15′19″W

Union Village is a village that spans Norwich and Thetford, Vermont, and sits along the Ompompanoosuc River. It contains a small cluster of homes with many dating to the early 1800s, a red brick Methodist Episcopal church built in 1836, a covered bridge, a small defunct school house, and a United States Army Corps of Engineers flood control dam.

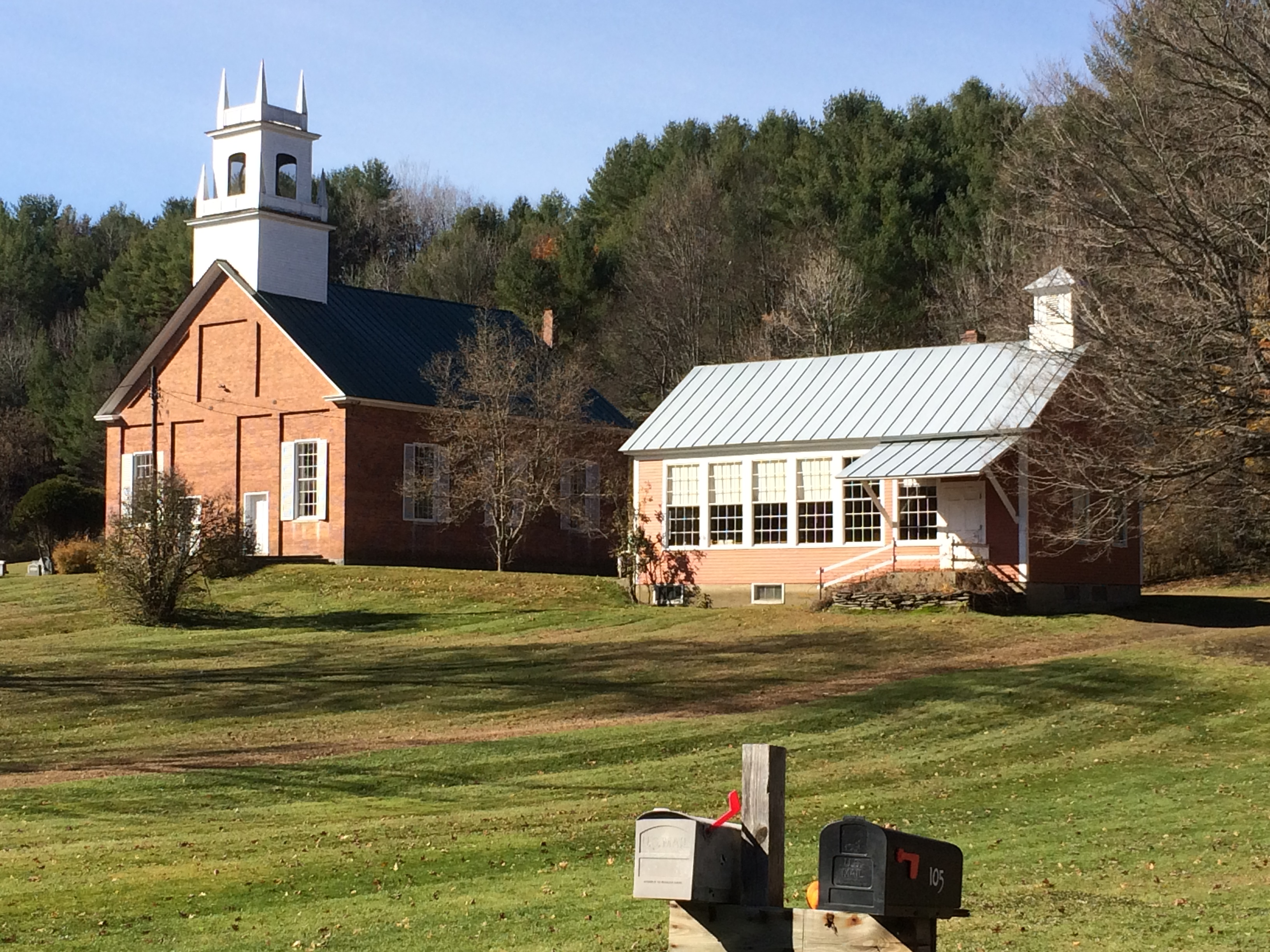
Union Village Vermont Church and School
