= Asa May House =

Asa May House may refer to:

- Asa May House (Capps, Florida), listed on the National Register of Historic Places in Jefferson County, Florida
- Asa May House (West Fairlee, Vermont), listed on the National Register of Historic Places in Orange County, Vermont
