= Thetford Hill State Park =

State park in Thetford, Vermont

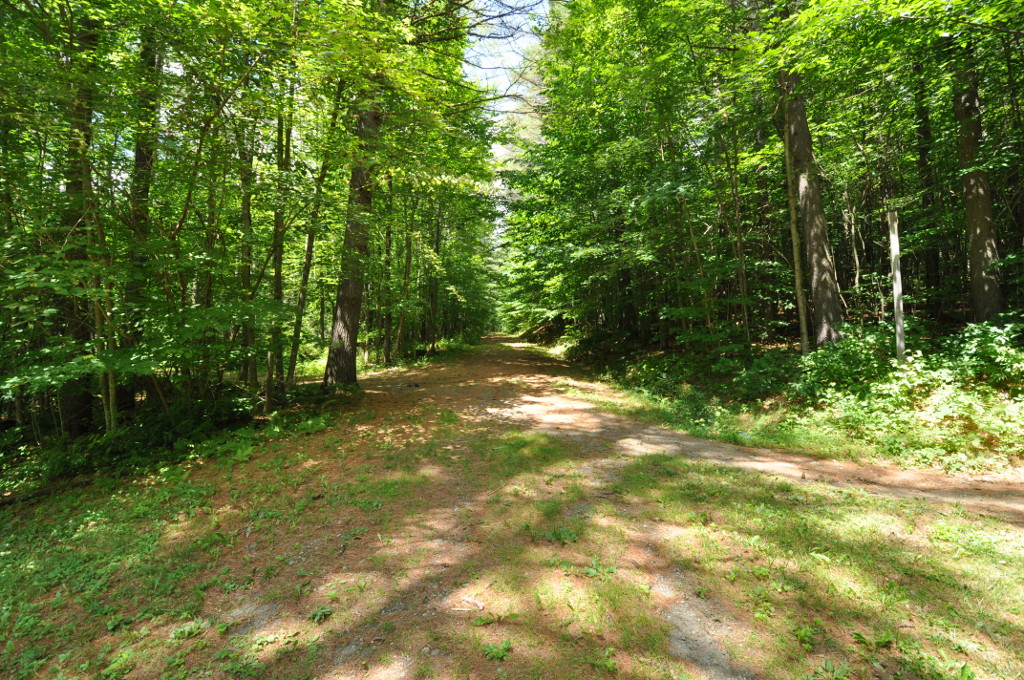
- Roadbed built by the CCC in Thetford Hill State Park
- Interactive map of Thetford Hill State Park
- Type: State park
- Location: Thetford, Vermont
- Coordinates: 43.8121°N 72.233°W
- Area: 262 acres (106 ha)
- Created: 1931
- Operator: Vermont Department of Forests, Parks, and Recreation
- Open: Day use
- Website: https://vtstateparks.com/thetford.html
- Thetford Hill State Park
- U.S. National Register of Historic Places
- U.S. Historic district
- NRHP reference No.: 02000029
- Added to NRHP: February 14, 2002

Thetford Hill State Park is a state park in Thetford, Vermont. It is a day-use park within the southern tract of Thetford Hill State Forest. The park includes paths for hiking and the 5-km Woods Hill Trail, a world-class cross-country running and skiing trail. Activities includes hiking, cross-country running and cross-country skiing. The park was listed on the National Register of Historic Places in 2002 for its historic facilities, some of which were developed by the Civilian Conservation Corps. It is currently under the care of Thetford Academy.

== Setting ==
Thetford Hill State Park is located in south-central Thetford, south of the village of Thetford Hill, and directly abutting the campus of Thetford Academy to the north. It occupies part of the eastern slope of a short ridge of hills, extending to the summit areas of Sunset Hill near the northern end of the ridge. The park is bounded on the east by Academy Road, from which the main access road rises to the west.

== Facilities ==
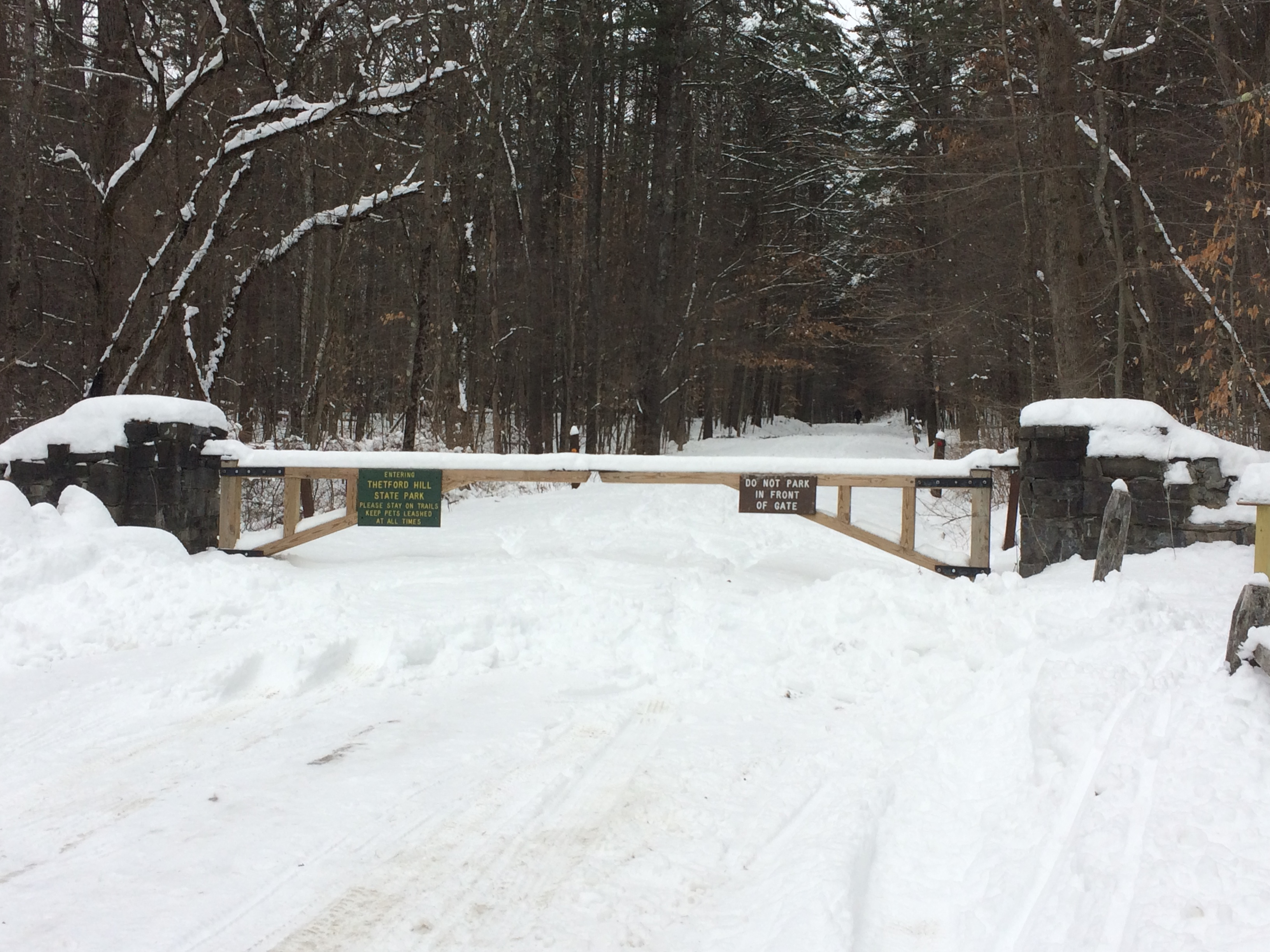
Entrance gate

Although the park was originally developed with a campground, it is now a day-use park with hiking trails. The road passes through a CCC-built gate, and runs nearly directly west, passing a wood-frame ranger contact station, near which a road branches south to a campground area formerly used by a summer camp. From the contact station, a road reaches Sunset Hill, a former picnicking area that now houses an outdoor classroom for Thetford Academy. The road is crossed and recrossed several times by the Woods Hill Trail, a multi-use hiking and cross-country ski trail that extends onto the Thetford Academy campus. Near the parking area are also the fragmented remains of a CCC-built campground, in which little more than stone fireplace and dilapidated restrooms are to be found.

== History ==
Before the park was created, the land was somewhat open, having been logged in the 19th century and only partially replanted. The state acquired the land in 1931, donated by Thetford local Dwight Goddard, and it was developed in the mid-1930s by crews of the Civilian Conservation Corps. Facilities built out then include the road and gate, and the campground near the summit. In 1964, a new camp loop was built near the present contact station, which was also built around that time, and the old campground was abandoned.

== See also ==
- National Register of Historic Places listings in Orange County, Vermont
