= Chauncey C. Churchill =

American politician

Chauncey C. Churchill (September 26, 1815 – April 18, 1889) was treasurer of Norfolk County, Massachusetts for 34 years and an Overseer of the House of Corrections. He was born in West Fairlee, Vermont as the son of William L. and Eliza Lamphear Churchill. He moved to Sudbury, Massachusetts before relocating again to Dedham, where he took a job at the Merchant Woolen Company's mill on Mother Brook.

From 1864 to 1869 he was deputy collector of internal revenue, and from 1871 to 1880 served on the Dedham School Committee. On June 7, 1842, he married Pemeia Sabin of Salisbury, and together they had a son, Chauncey S., and a daughter Isalore Marie. He was regarded as "one of Dedham's most esteemed and honored citizens."

He was elected as County Treasurer in April 1855 and was succeeded by Charles W. Smith. He was treasurer of the Norfolk Agricultural Society. His portrait is in the collection of the Dedham Historical Society. He was also a Justice of the Peace.
