= West Fairlee Center Church =

Historic church in Vermont, United States

- U.S. National Register of Historic Places
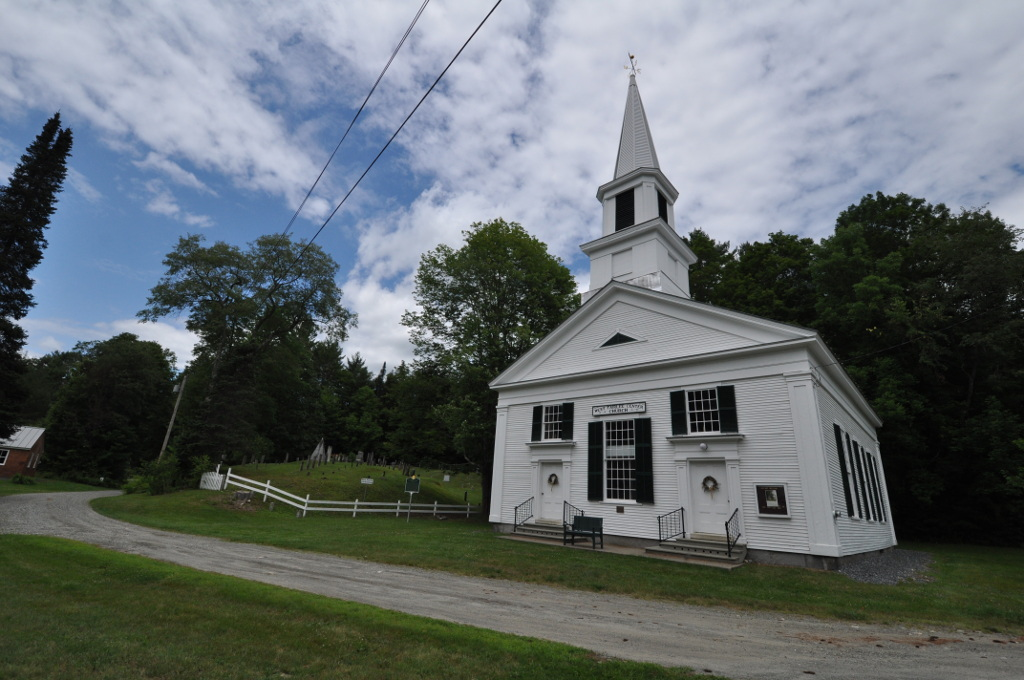

- Location within Vermont Location within the United States
- Location: 3870 Middlebrook Rd., West Fairlee, Vermont
- Coordinates: 43°56′34″N 72°13′31″W
- Area: less than one acre
- Built: 1855
- Architectural style: Greek Revival
- MPS: Religious Buildings, Sites and Structures in Vermont MPS
- NRHP reference No.: 02000662
- Added to NRHP: June 21, 2002

The West Fairlee Center Church is a historic church building at Middlebrook and Bear Notch Roads in West Fairlee, Vermont. Built in 1855, it is a fine and little-altered example of rural Greek Revival architecture, also notable for the association of its congregation with Nathaniel Niles, a prominent local minister, landowner, and politician. It was listed on the National Register of Historic Places in 2002.

== Description and history ==
The West Fairlee Center Church stands prominently in the rural village of West Fairlee Center, at the north side of the triangular junction of Middlebrook and Bear Notch Roads. It is a single-story wood-frame structure, with a gabled metal roof and clapboarded exterior. The roof is topped by a tower, its first stage crowned by a cornice, and the second stage consisting of an octagonal louvered belfry with paneled pilasters at the angled sides. It is topped by a steeple that is a 1973 replacement of the original. The main facade is three bays wide, with corner pilasters rising to an entablature and fully pedimented gable. There are two entrances flanking a central window; each is framed by paneled pilasters and a corniced entablature, and topped by a smaller window. The interior has a vestibule under a balcony, which has a pressed tin roof and chamfered square columns for support. The main sanctuary has plaster walls with wainscoting, and its ceiling is also pressed tin. The bench pews are original to the building, as is the pulpit area; the organ dates to 1893.

The town of West Fairlee was separated from Fairlee in 1797, supposedly in part due to a personal dispute between two major landowners, Col. Isaac Morey and Nathaniel Niles. Niles was a major landowner in West Fairlee, and often contended with Morey for a seat in the state legislature. Early Congregationalist gatherings were held at his house (which still stands to the south), prior to the construction of the first church in 1811. The present church was built in 1855 to accommodate the town's growing population. Its location, at roughly the geographic town center, was originally the economic and civic center of the community, but was eclipsed by the present village center later in the 19th century, when it arose as to support local mining operations.

== See also ==
- National Register of Historic Places listings in Orange County, Vermont
