= Gustavus Loomis =

American Union Army colonel and general (1789–1872)

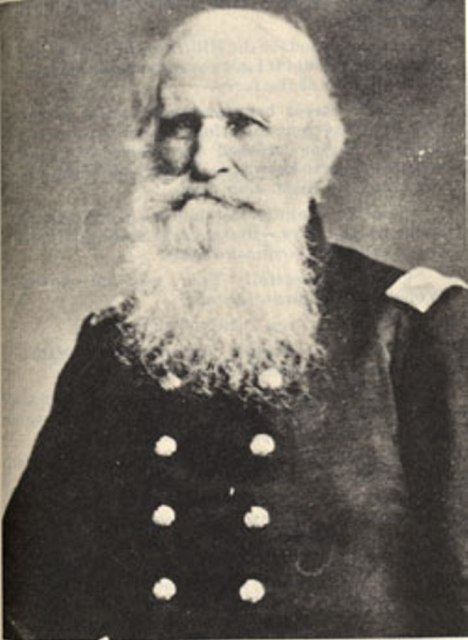
- Gustavus Loomis
- Born: September 23, 1789; Thetford, Vermont, U.S.
- Died: March 5, 1872 (aged 82); Stratford, Connecticut, U.S.
- Burial place: Grove Street Cemetery in New Haven, Connecticut
- Military career
- Allegiance: United States of America; Union
- Branch: United States Army; Union Army
- Service years: 1811–1867
- Rank: Colonel; Brevet Brigadier General
- Conflicts: War of 1812; Battle of Fort George; Capture of Fort Niagara (POW); Black Hawk War; Second Seminole War; Battle of Lake Okeechobee; Mexican-American War; Third Seminole War; American Civil War

Gustavus A. Loomis (September 23, 1789 – March 5, 1872) was a United States Army officer who served during the War of 1812, the Seminole Wars, the Mexican–American War and the American Civil War. He was one of the oldest soldiers to serve in the Civil War.

== Biography ==
Loomis was born in Thetford, Vermont, and graduated from West Point in 1811.

He entered the army as a second lieutenant of artillery. After garrison duty in the harbor of New York in 1812–13, he was ordered to the Niagara frontier in 1813 for service in the War of 1812. He assisted in the capture of Fort George (May 27, 1813) and was made prisoner at Fort Niagara on December 19, 1813. He was exchanged and transferred to the Artillery Corps on May 12, 1814.

Following the War of 1812, Loomis was promoted to captain in 1819. He was transferred to the infantry in 1821. In 1832, during the Black Hawk War, he was in garrison at Fort Crawford, Wisconsin. During the Second Seminole War, Loomis was promoted to major in the 2nd U.S. Infantry Regiment in 1838. He was promoted to lieutenant colonel on September 22, 1840. He commanded the 6th U.S. Infantry Regiment in Florida (1842–1844) and served as Lieut. Col of the 6th U.S. Infantry in the Mexican War (1846–1848). On March 9, 1851, Loomis was promoted to colonel and was given command of the 5th U.S. Infantry Regiment at Fort Belknap, Texas (1852–1853). During the Third Seminole War, he served as commander of the Department of Florida from 1857 to 1858.

During the Civil War, he was so successful as a recruiter in Connecticut and Rhode Island that President Lincoln made him Superintendent of General Recruiting for the entire Union army at Fort Columbus, New York. He also served as commandant of the prisoner of war camp at Fort Columbus.

On June 1, 1863, Loomis was retired from active duty as a colonel of infantry, but was immediately recalled to duty. In 1864, he was assigned as a senior court martial officer at Fort Columbus. He remained on active duty after the war to process administrative and court martial proceedings. In 1867, he was still in uniform, managing army supply, personnel, and administrative issues related to his duties as a court martial officer.

On July 17, 1866, President Andrew Johnson nominated Loomis for appointment to the brevet grade of brigadier general in the Regular Army for long and faithful service, to rank from March 13, 1865, and the U.S. Senate confirmed the appointment on July 26, 1866.

Gustavus Loomis died on March 5, 1872, at Stratford, Connecticut. He was buried at Grove Street Cemetery in New Haven, Connecticut. Throughout his life in the military, he was often known as a Christian officer.

== See also ==
- List of American Civil War brevet generals (Union)
