= Vermontasaurus =

Folk art wooden dinosaur sculpture

Coordinates: 43°53′09″N 72°14′59″W

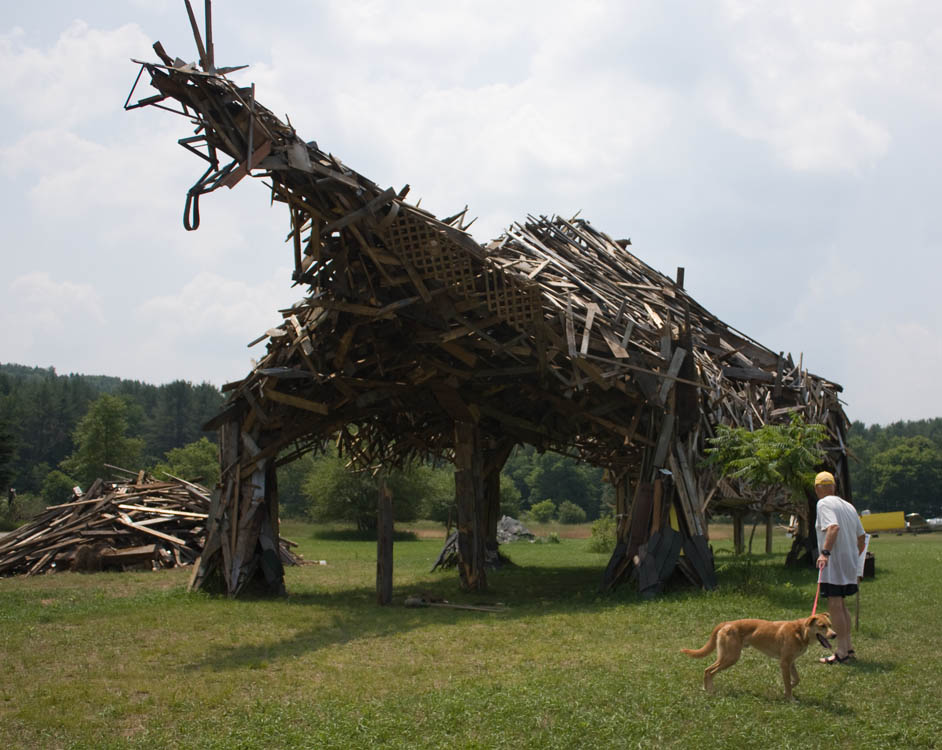
Vermontasaurus sculpture in Post Mills, Vermont, July 2010.

Vermontasaurus is a 25-foot-tall (7.6 m), 122-foot-long (37 m) folk art representation of a dinosaur at the Post Mills Airport in the town of Thetford, Vermont.

== Overview ==
The Vermontasaurus is the creation of Brian Boland, a retired teacher and experimental balloon pilot, who with a crew of volunteers used scrap lumber obtained from a collapsed portion of Boland's private museum and hot-air balloon manufacturing facility to build the sculpture, starting in June 2010. Boland adopted the name, "Vermontasaurus," from the comment of an onlooker.

According to the Valley News, the sculpture is part of an eclectic collection of old cars, improvised vehicles connected with hot-air ballooning, and other curiosities that Boland has assembled at the Post Mills Airport.

== Controversy ==
As of July 2010 the State of Vermont and the town of Thetford had weighed in on whether Vermontasaurus was a work of art or a structure that requires a permit. The state Division of Fire Safety prohibited people from being allowed underneath the sculpture, pending the approval of a structural engineer to attest that it was safe to do so. Subsequently, Vermont District Environmental Commission No. 3 granted a permit for the wooden dinosaur, ruling that it had no negative environmental impact under Vermont's Act 250. Despite an initial assertion that the structure would require a building permit, the town of Thetford waived the requirement, ruling that the structure is a work of art. The sculpture received confirmation as a permitted use from Thetford's Development Review Board in an August 2010 meeting attended by more than 50 people. The decision was controversial because such a large sculpture was not a use envisioned in the town's ordinances.

== Collapse and reconstruction ==
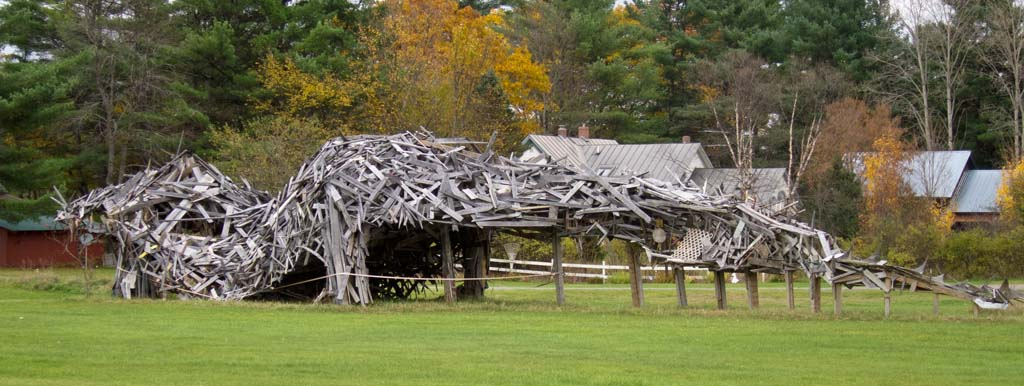
Vermontasaurus after its October 2011 collapse.

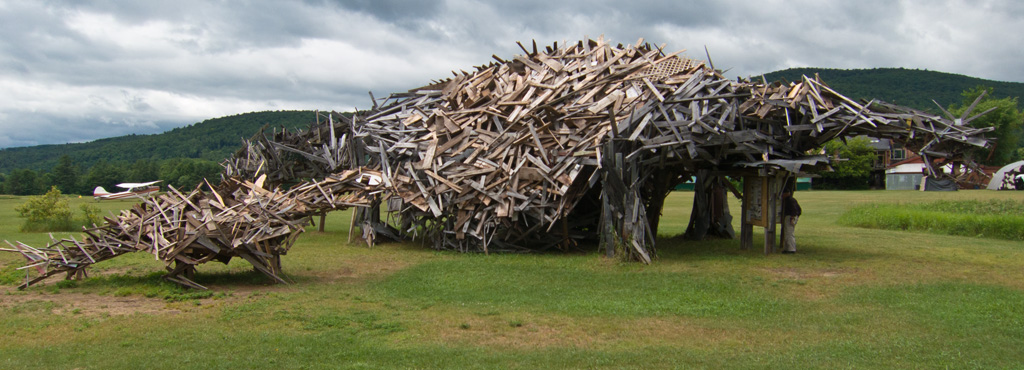
Vermontasaurus after its June 2012 restoration.

In October 2011, three months after the State of Vermont ruled that the sculpture could remain in place, the structure's midsection sagged to the ground. In June 2012, Boland organized approximately 50 volunteers from as far away as Maine to transform the collapsed portion of the sculpture into a revised representation of a dinosaur. In addition, volunteers built a "baby Vermontasaurus", alongside.
