= Post Mills Airport =

Airport in Thetford, Vermont

- IATA: none; ICAO: none; FAA LID: 2B9

Summary
- Airport type: Public
- Owner: Brian Boland (died in hot air balloon accident July 15, 2021)
- Serves: Post Mills, Vermont
- Elevation AMSL: 693 ft / 211 m
- Coordinates: 43°53′03″N 072°15′13″W
- Website: vtrans.vermont.gov/aviation/airports/post-mills-airport

Map
- Interactive map of Post Mills Airport

Runways
Direction	Length		Surface
Direction	ft	m	Surface
04/22	2,900	884	Turf
05/23	2,300	701	Turf

Statistics (2009)
- Aircraft operations: 4,333
- Based aircraft: 33
- Source: Federal Aviation Administration

Post Mills Airport (FAA LID: 2B9) is a privately owned, public use airport in Orange County, Vermont, United States. It is located within the central business district of the Village of Post Mills.

Although most U.S. airports use the same three-letter location identifier for the FAA and IATA, this airport is assigned 2B9 by the FAA but has no designation from the IATA

== Facilities and aircraft ==
Post Mills Airport covers an area of 50 acres (20 ha) at an elevation of 693 feet (211 m) above mean sea level. It has two turf runways designated 04/22, with a surface measuring 2,900 by 80 feet (884 x 24 m) and 05/23, with a surface measuring 2,300 by 80 feet (701 x 24 m).

For the 12-month period ending June 2, 2009, the airport had 4,333 aircraft operations, an average of 12 per day: 100% general aviation with a few air taxi and ultralights. At that time there were 33 aircraft based at this airport: 73% single-engine, 18% gliders and 9% ultralights. The latest activity there is their annual balloon festival where they have trained people operating the balloons. But also people who can create their own, register and sign up to try it out at the festival.

== See also ==
- List of airports in Vermont
