= Vermont Route 113 =

State highway in Orange County, Vermont, US

Vermont Route 113
- VT 113 highlighted in red

Route information
- Maintained by VTrans
- Length: 22.847 mi (36.769 km)

Major junctions
- West end: VT 110 in Chelsea
- I-91 in Thetford
- East end: East Thetford Road at Lyme, NH

Location
- Country: United States
- State: Vermont
- Counties: Orange

Highway system
- State highways in Vermont
← VT 112	→ VT 114

Vermont Route 113 (VT 113) is a 22.847-mile-long (36.769 km) east–west state highway in eastern Vermont in the United States. It runs south and east from an intersection with VT 110 in Chelsea to the New Hampshire border in Thetford. VT 113 crosses the Connecticut River, becoming East Thetford Road, an unnumbered local road in the town of Lyme, New Hampshire which connects to New Hampshire Route 10.

== Route description ==
Route 113 begins in the west at an intersection with Route 110 in the town of Chelsea. Route 113 begins its eastward journey proceeding out of Chelsea, passing into and through the town of Vershire, serving the town center. The highway takes a turn to the south towards the town of West Fairlee, where it intersects the western terminus of Route 244. Route 113 is signed as an east–west highway, but at this point is heading due south. It continues southward until crossing into the town of Thetford, where it begins to turn back to the east. Route 113 interchanges with Interstate 91 in the town, at Exit 14. The highway continues to the east, into the village of East Thetford, where it intersects U.S. Route 5 just west of the Connecticut River and the border with New Hampshire. Route 113 briefly overlaps US-5 (for about 30 yards), before turning east to cross the river. Route 113 ends at the bridge crossing, continuing as East Thetford Road in Lyme, New Hampshire, an unnumbered local road which intersects with NH-10 approximately 1 mile (1.6 km) to the east.

== Major intersections ==
The entire route is in Orange County.

Location	mi	km	Destinations	Notes
Chelsea	0.000	0.000	VT 110 – Tunbridge, South Royalton, Washington, East Barre	Western terminus
Thetford	14.832	23.870	VT 244 east – Ely, Lake Fairlee	Western terminus of VT 244
Thetford	20.969– 21.155	33.746– 34.046	I-91 – Fairlee, St. Johnsbury, Norwich	Exit 14 on I-91; diamond interchange
Thetford	22.524	36.249	US 5 north – North Thetford, Fairlee	Western end of concurrency with US 5
Thetford	22.579	36.337	US 5 south – Pompanoosuc, Norwich, White River Junction	Eastern end of concurrency with US 5
Thetford	22.847	36.769	East Thetford Road – Lyme NH	Continuation into New Hampshire via Lyme–East Thetford Bridge
1.000 mi = 1.609 km; 1.000 km = 0.621 mi: Concurrency terminus
