= West Fairlee, Vermont =

- Town
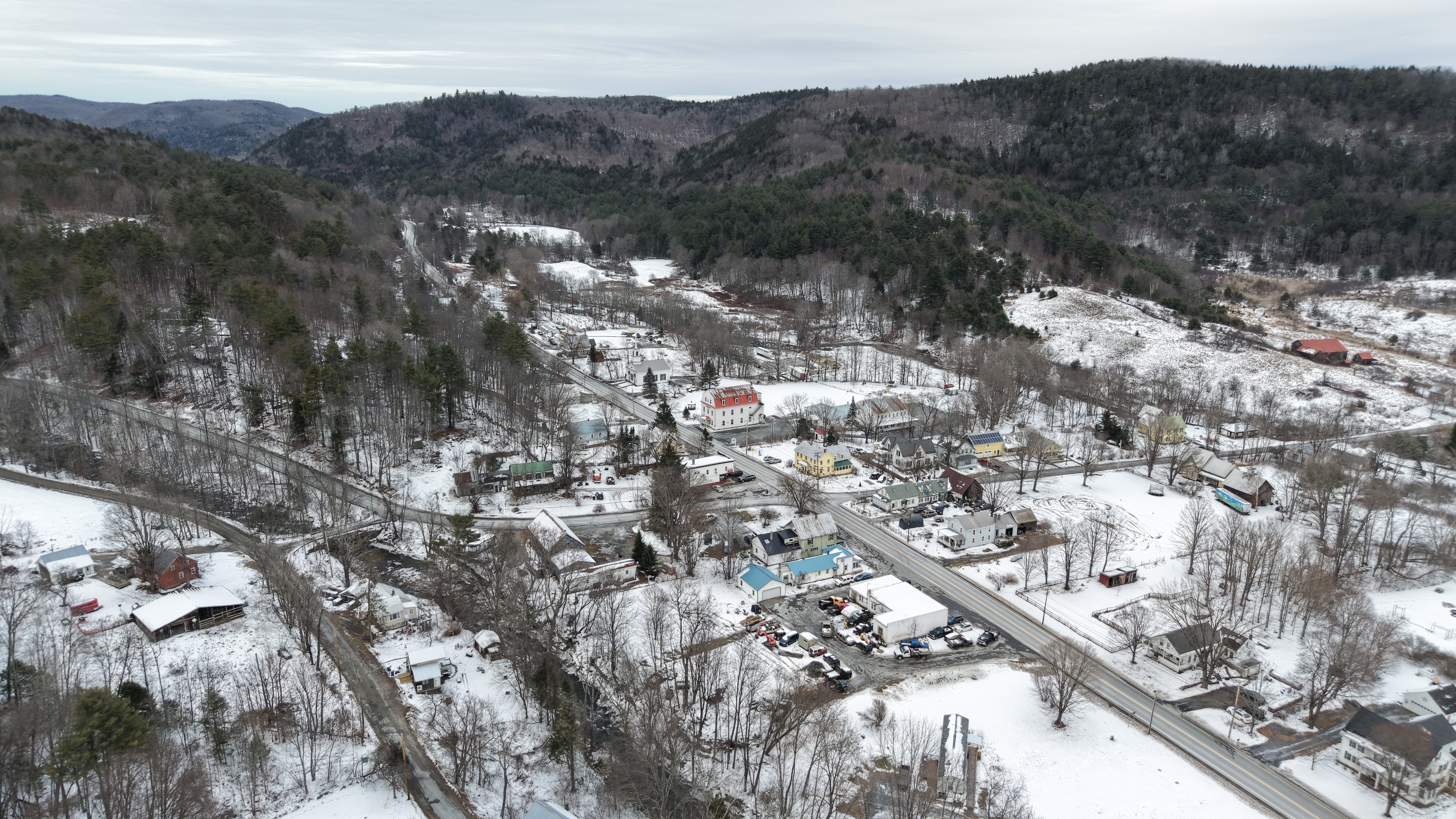
- West Fairlee, VT, from the southwest

- Logo

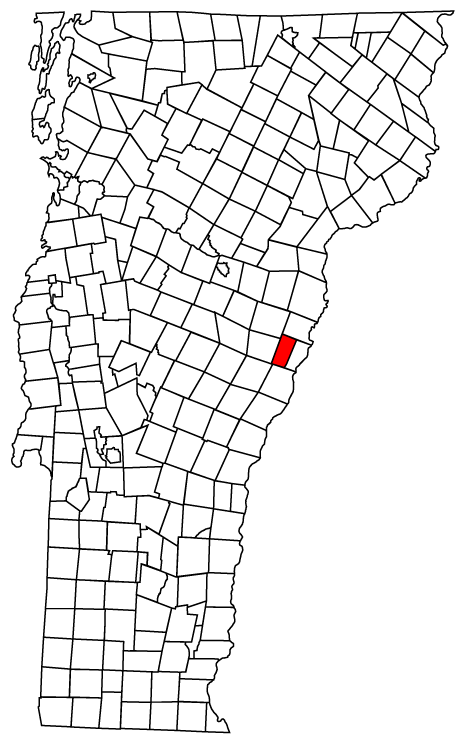
- Located in Orange County, Vermont
- Coordinates: 43°55′44″N 72°14′38″W
- Country: United States
- State: Vermont
- County: Orange
- Chartered: 1797
- Communities: West Fairlee; West Fairlee Center

Area
  - Total: 22.8 sq mi (59.1 km^{2})
  - Land: 22.6 sq mi (58.5 km^{2})
  - Water: 0.23 sq mi (0.6 km^{2})
- Elevation: 732 ft (223 m)

Population (2020)
  - Total: 621
  - Density: 27/sq mi (10.6/km^{2})
  - Households: 392
  - Families: 238
- Time zone: UTC-5 (EST)
  - Summer (DST): UTC-4 (EDT)
- ZIP Codes: 05083 (West Fairlee); 05045 (Fairlee); 05033 (Bradford); 05079 (Vershire)
- Area code: 802
- FIPS code: 50-79975
- GNIS feature ID: 1462249
- Website: westfairleevt.gov

West Fairlee is a town in Orange County, Vermont, United States. The population was 621 at the 2020 census.

== History ==
Originally a part of the town of Fairlee, West Fairlee separated in 1797. The town was first settled by Nathaniel Niles that same year. The town remained predominantly agricultural until copper was discovered in nearby Vershire in 1813. With the opening of the Ely Copper Mine in 1821 the town rapidly began to grow. The mine became the site of Vermont's largest labor revolt, dubbed the 'Ely War,' in 1883. Unable to remain financially solvent the mine was sold to George Westinghouse.

Combined with a fire that destroyed much of the town in 1910 and the mine's closure in 1920, West Fairlee's economy suffered immensely. Today the town is largely a bedroom community.

Samuel Graves originally established his brass and woodwind instrument company Graves & Co. here in 1824.

During the American Civil War, 98 residents served, or 11% of the town’s population. Among them was Medal of Honor recipient General Stephen Thomas. The town also sent men from Company A of the 15th Vermont Infantry Regiment, which was organized in West Fairlee in 1862.

West Fairlee was the summer residence of Nobel-winning economist Milton Friedman, which he named "Capitaf." It was here that he and his wife, Rose Friedman wrote the 1980 bestselling book, Free to Choose.

Portions of the 1983 film The Survivors, starring Walter Mathau and Robin Williams was filmed in West Fairlee.

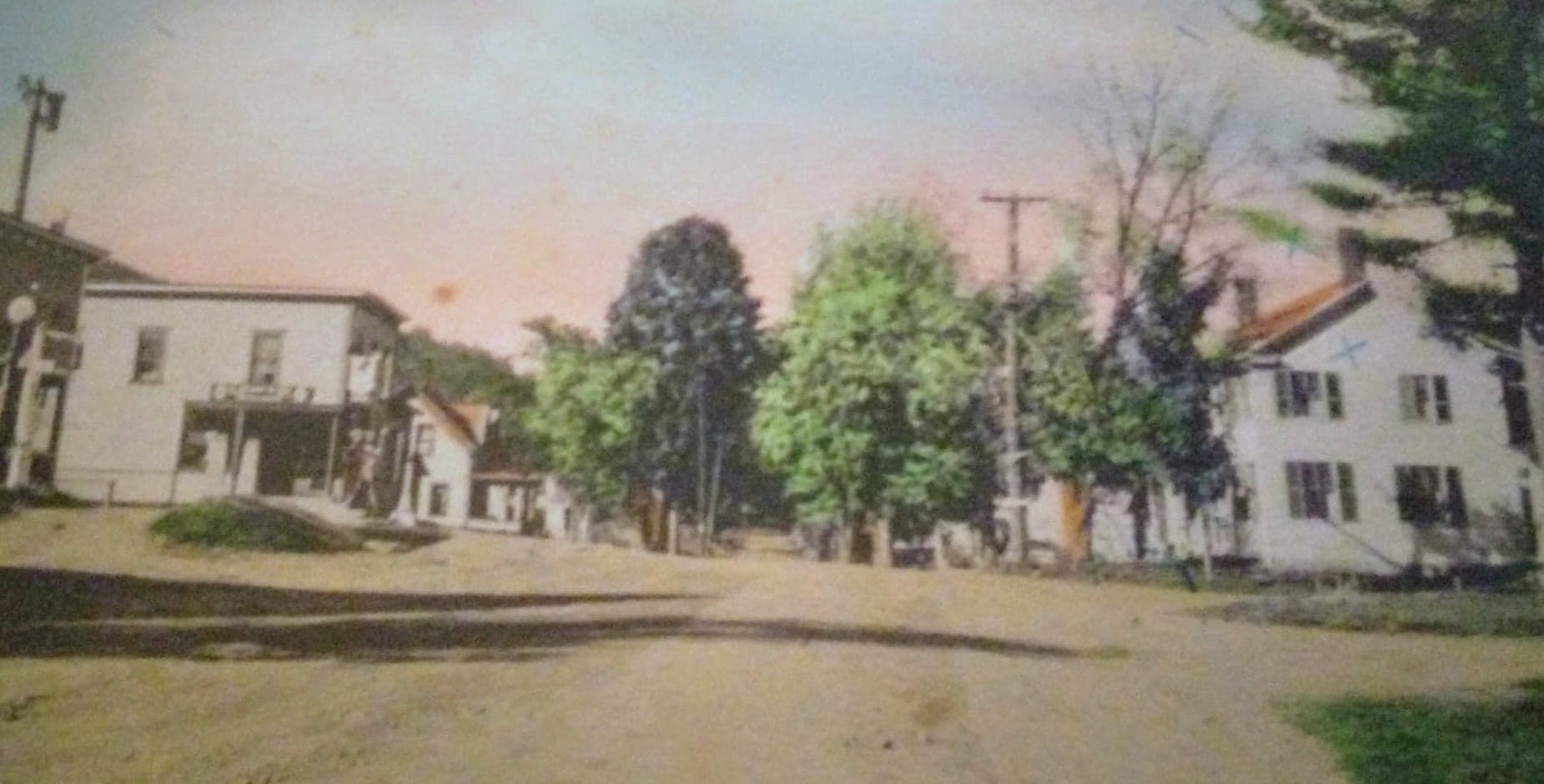
West Fairlee Village

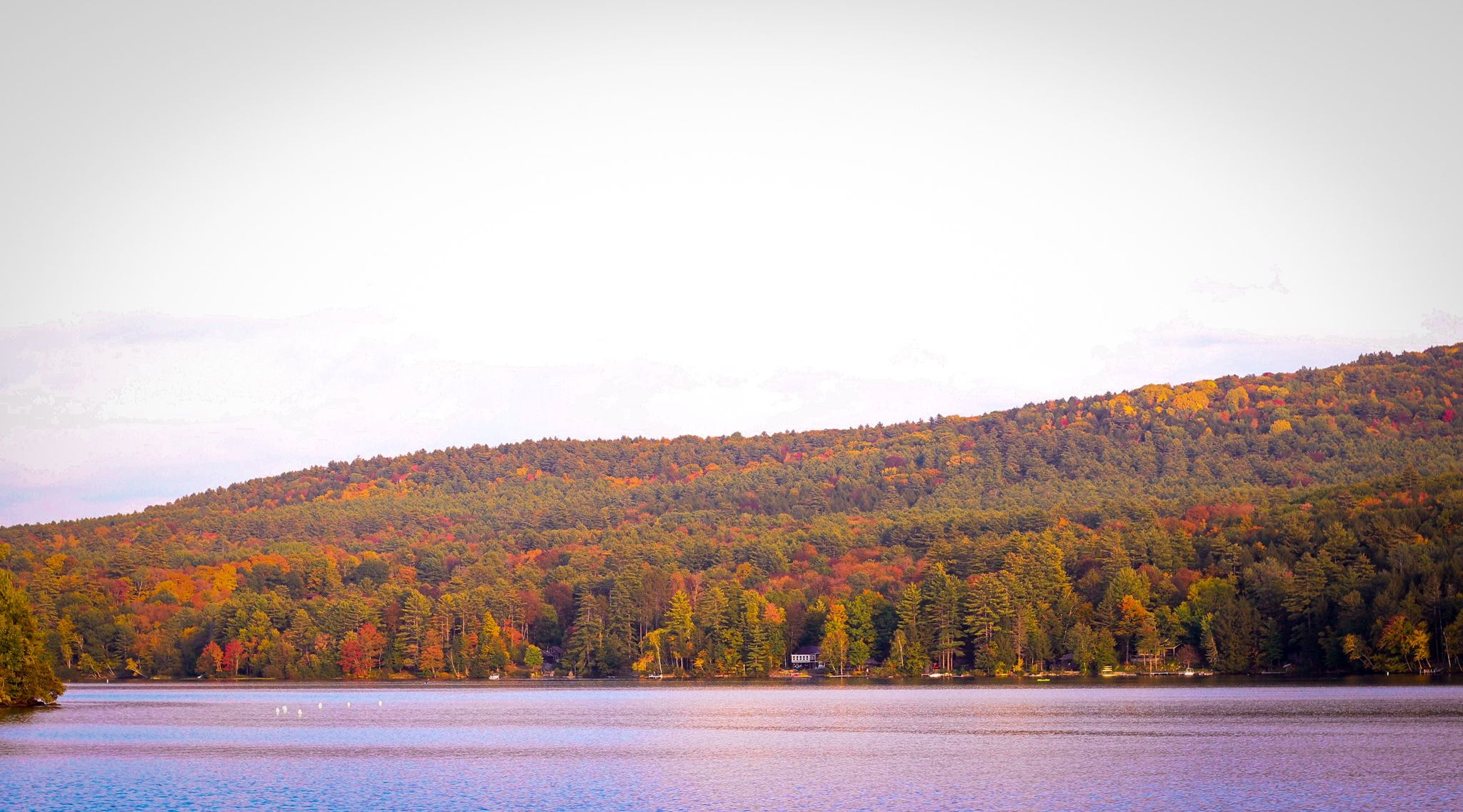
Lake Fairlee

== Landmarks ==
- West Fairlee is home to two historic summer camps: Camp Billings and Aloha Horizons Camp.
- West Fairlee Center Church
- Asa May House

== Geography ==
According to the United States Census Bureau, the town has a total area of 22.8 square miles (59.1 km^{2}), of which 22.6 square miles (58.5 km^{2}) is land and 0.2 square mile (0.6 km^{2}) (0.96%) is water. The Ompompanoosuc River flows through the southwestern part of the town.

== Demographics ==
Historical population
Census	Pop.	Note	%±
1800	391		—
1810	983		151.4%
1820	1,143		16.3%
1830	841		−26.4%
1840	824		−2.0%
1850	696		−15.5%
1860	830		19.3%
1870	833		0.4%
1880	1,038		24.6%
1890	561		−46.0%
1900	531		−5.3%
1910	446		−16.0%
1920	387		−13.2%
1930	405		4.7%
1940	428		5.7%
1950	363		−15.2%
1960	333		−8.3%
1970	337		1.2%
1980	427		26.7%
1990	633		48.2%
2000	726		14.7%
2010	652		−10.2%
2020	621		−4.8%
U.S. Decennial Census

As of the census of 2000, there were 726 people, 278 households, and 197 families residing in the town. The population density was 32.1 people per square mile (12.4/km^{2}). There were 340 housing units at an average density of 15.0 per square mile (5.8/km^{2}). The racial makeup of the town was 98.76% White, 0.14% African American, 0.55% Native American, 0.41% Asian, 0.14% from other races.

There were 278 households, out of which 36.3% had children under the age of 18 living with them, 56.8% were married couples living together, 7.9% had a female householder with no husband present, and 29.1% were non-families. 20.9% of all households were made up of individuals, and 5.4% had someone living alone who was 65 years of age or older. The average household size was 2.61 and the average family size was 3.02.

In the town, the population was spread out, with 27.8% under the age of 18, 7.0% from 18 to 24, 32.4% from 25 to 44, 24.4% from 45 to 64, and 8.4% who were 65 years of age or older. The median age was 35 years. For every 100 females, there were 102.8 males. For every 100 females age 18 and over, there were 100.0 males.

The median income for a household in the town was $40,667, and the median income for a family was $42,500. Males had a median income of $27,200 versus $22,788 for females. The per capita income for the town was $18,011. About 8.0% of families and 10.7% of the population were below the poverty line, including 16.1% of those under age 18 and 8.7% of those age 65 or over.

== Education ==
Residents are in the Rivendell Interstate School District. Westshire Elementary School is in West Fairlee.

== Notable people ==
- Asa L. Baldwin, Wisconsin state assemblyman
- Chauncey C. Churchill
- Jabez William Clay, Founder of Phi Sigma Kappa fraternity.
- Eben Pomeroy Colton, Lieutenant Governor of the State of Vermont from 1878 to 1880
- Milton Friedman, Nobel Prize-winning economist in economics
- Charlotte Geer Olympic rower
- Nathaniel Niles, US congressman
- Albert Southworth, photographer known for daguerreotypes in the first half of the 19th century
- Stephen Thomas, recipient of the Medal of Honor for gallantry
