= Ompompanoosuc River =

River in the U.S. state of Vermont

Coordinates: 43°45′06″N 72°13′45″W

- Ompompanoosuc River with Tucker Hill Road bridge

Location
- State: Vermont

Physical characteristics
- Mouth: Connecticut River
  - location: Pompanoosuc
- Length: 25 miles (40 km)

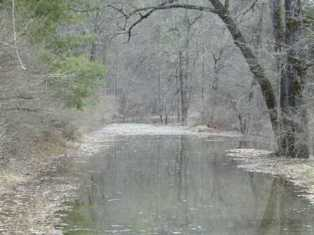
The Ompompanoosuc River near the Union Village Dam in Thetford

The Ompompanoosuc River /ˈɒmpɒmpənuːsək/ is a river, about 25 miles (40 km) long, in eastern Vermont in the United States. It is a tributary of the Connecticut River, which flows to Long Island Sound. According to the Geographic Names Information System, the river has also been known by the names "Om-pom-pa-noos-uc" and "Pompanoosuc."

The Ompompanoosuc River rises in eastern Orange County in the town of Vershire, and flows generally southwardly through the towns of West Fairlee and Thetford into northeastern Windsor County, where it joins the Connecticut River in the village of Pompanoosuc which is located in the town of Norwich.

In Thetford, the river is dammed by the Union Village Dam, which was built from 1946 to 1950 as part of a U.S. Army Corps of Engineers project for flood control. The structure is a 170-foot-high earthen dam, creating a seasonal lake in the winter.

The West Branch Ompompanoosuc River flows generally southeastwardly through the towns of Vershire and Strafford to Thetford, where it joins the main stem of the river.

== See also ==
- List of Vermont rivers
- Thetford Center Covered Bridge
- Union Village Covered Bridge
