= Post Mills, Vermont =

Unincorporated community in Vermont, U.S.

Coordinates: 43°53′08″N 72°15′38″W

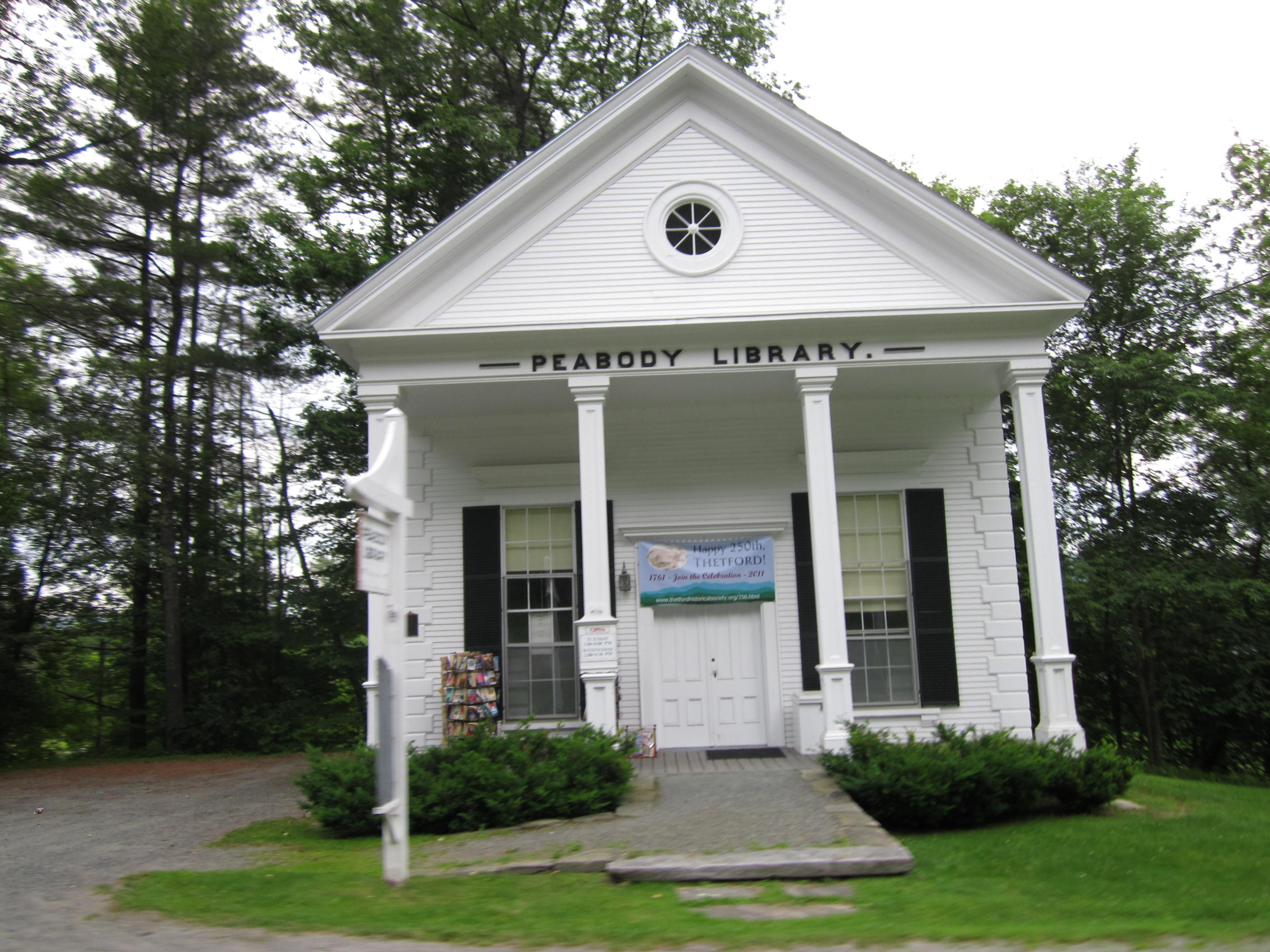
Peabody Library, Post Mills

Post Mills is an unincorporated community in the town of Thetford, Orange County, Vermont, United States.

== History ==
Post Mills was the site of the T. H. Chubb Rod Factory, which was, in the late 19th and early 20th century, the largest fishing rod factory in the country. By the late 1930s, the facility had been taken over by the Malmquist Wood Products Company. The factory closed in the 1990s and was torn down in 2010.

== Present day ==
Post Mills is largely a bedroom community. It is also home to the Post Mills Soaring Club and the Vermontasaurus, a large wooden statue of a dinosaur. The ZIP Code for Post Mills is 05058.
