= Thetford, Vermont =

- Town
- Thetford Hill, VT, from the southeast

- Seal

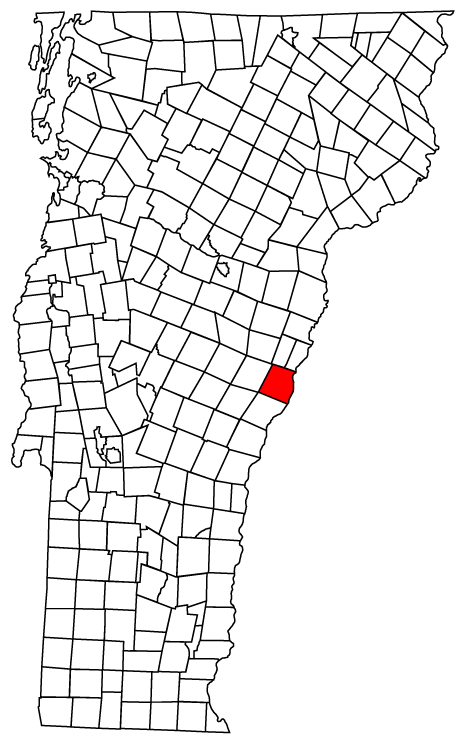
- Located in Orange County, Vermont
- Coordinates: 43°51′36″N 72°14′54″W
- Country: United States
- State: Vermont
- County: Orange
- Chartered: 1761
- Communities: East Thetford; North Thetford; Post Mills; Thetford Center; Thetford Hill; Union Village

Area
  - Total: 44.2 sq mi (114.4 km^{2})
  - Land: 43.6 sq mi (112.8 km^{2})
  - Water: 0.62 sq mi (1.6 km^{2})
- Elevation: 564 ft (172 m)

Population (2020)
  - Total: 2,775
  - Density: 64/sq mi (24.6/km^{2})
  - Households: 1,155
  - Families: 707
- Time zone: UTC-5 (EST)
  - Summer (DST): UTC-4 (EDT)
- ZIP Codes: 05074 (Thetford); 05075 (Thetford Center); 05043 (East Thetford); 05058 (Post Mills); 05045 (Fairlee)
- Area code: 802
- FIPS code: 50-72400
- GNIS feature ID: 1462226
- Website: www.thetfordvt.gov

Thetford is a town in Orange County, Vermont, United States in the Connecticut River Valley. The population was 2,775 at the 2020 census. Villages within the town include East Thetford, North Thetford, Thetford Hill, Thetford Center, Rices Mills, Union Village, and Post Mills. The town office is in Thetford Center.

Thetford is home to Thetford Academy, Vermont's oldest secondary school. Girl Scouts of the Green and White Mountains, formerly Swift Water Girl Scout Council, also has a summer residential camp here called Camp Farnsworth. Camp Farnsworth originally started under private ownership by Chelebe and Madama Farnsworth in 1909 when it was called Camp Hanoum.

== History ==
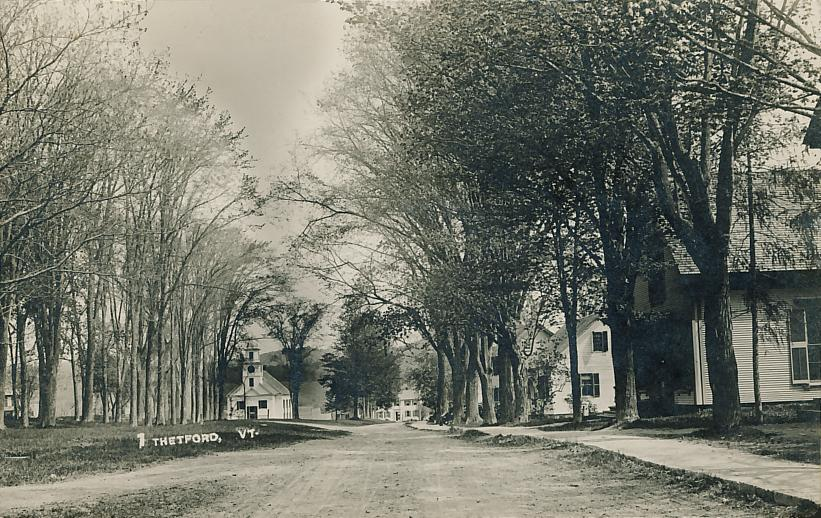
Thetford in 1912

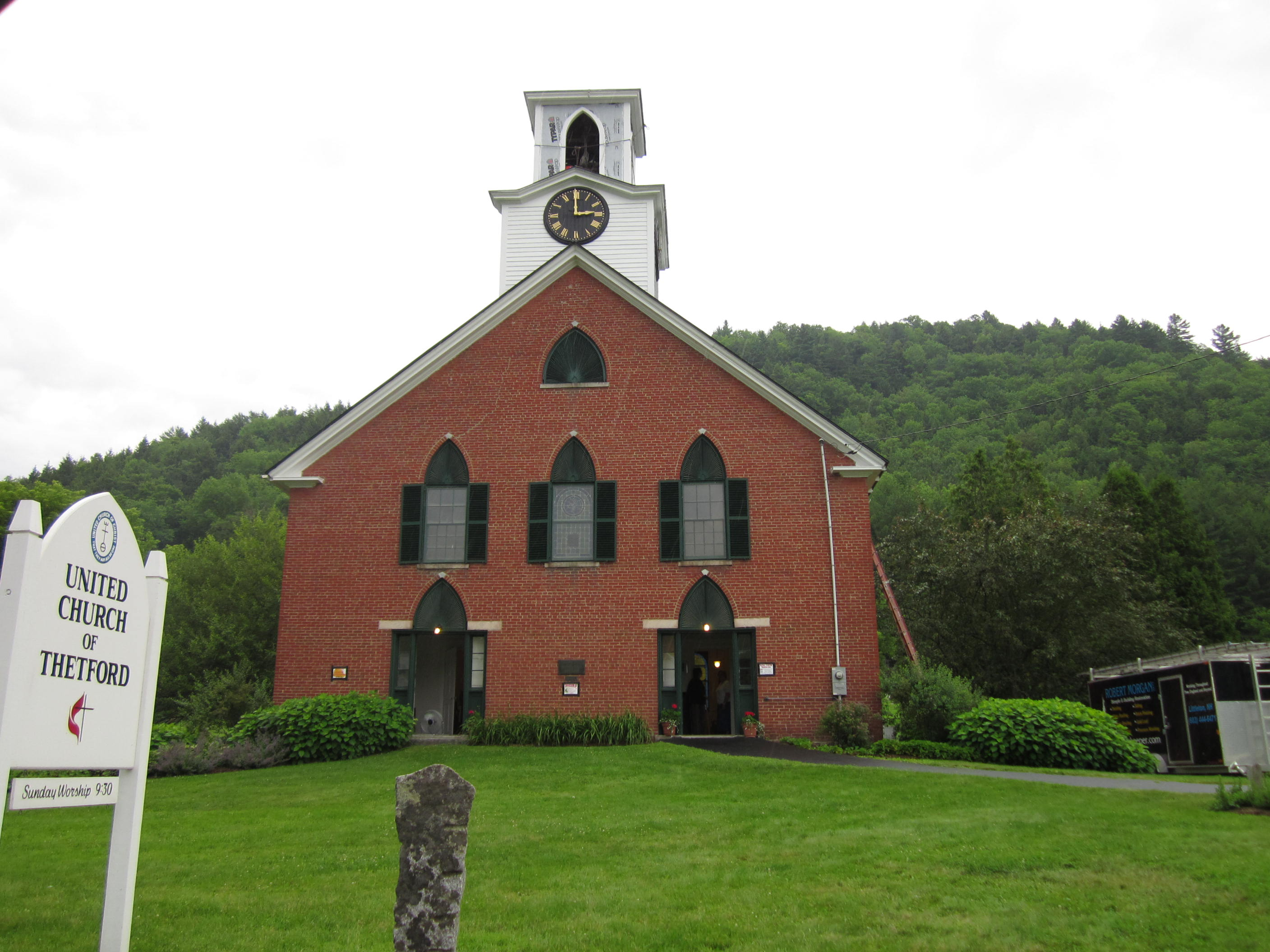
United Church of Thetford

The town was created on August 12, 1761, by way of a royal charter which King George III of Great Britain issued to Governor Benning Wentworth of New Hampshire. Wentworth named it for Augustus Henry Fitzroy, 3rd Duke of Grafton, 4th Earl of Arlington and 4th Viscount Thetford, who in 1768 became prime minister. It was first settled in 1764 by John Chamberlin, who lived at East Thetford beside the Connecticut River. He was an agent for one of 62 proprietors (51 from Hebron, Connecticut).

In 1910, the Camp Fire Girls were founded locally. This became a national organization within two years.

Gove Hill Retreat, a nonprofit Christian Retreat center, was founded in 1966 in Thetford Center. The center supplied hospitality to religious, educational and other non-profit organizations. The retreat was sited on property originally owned by John Gove, the first farmer and name sake of Gove Hill. It was closed December 31, 2013, after the American Baptist Churches of Vermont and New Hampshire (ABCVNH) decided the yearly upkeep was not worth it. The retreat center had run a deficit for a number of years. The Pastor's larger salary were both believed to be factors in the closing of the doors.

On March 1, 2025, Thetford became the first municipality in the United States to sign the Apartheid-Free Pledge in support of Palestine during the Israeli-Palestinian conflict that had started in 2023.

== Geography ==
According to the United States Census Bureau, the town has a total area of 44.2 square miles (114.4 km^{2}), of which 43.6 square miles (112.8 km^{2}) is land and 0.6 square mile (1.6 km^{2}) (1.36%) is water. It is bordered on the east by the Connecticut River, and the Ompompanoosuc River flows through the town. Interstate Highway 91 traverses it.

The town has six active, unincorporated villages: Thetford Hill, Thetford Center, East Thetford, North Thetford, Rice Mills, and Post Mills.

== Demographics ==
Historical population
Census	Pop.	Note	%±
1790	862		—
1800	1,478		71.5%
1810	1,785		20.8%
1820	1,915		7.3%
1830	2,113		10.3%
1840	2,065		−2.3%
1850	2,016		−2.4%
1860	1,876		−6.9%
1870	1,613		−14.0%
1880	1,529		−5.2%
1890	1,287		−15.8%
1900	1,249		−3.0%
1910	1,182		−5.4%
1920	1,089		−7.9%
1930	1,052		−3.4%
1940	1,043		−0.9%
1950	1,046		0.3%
1960	1,049		0.3%
1970	1,422		35.6%
1980	2,188		53.9%
1990	2,438		11.4%
2000	2,617		7.3%
2010	2,588		−1.1%
2020	2,775		7.2%
U.S. Decennial Census

As of the census of 2000, there were 2,617 people, 1,032 households and 730 families residing in the town. The population density was 60.1 people per square mile (23.2/km^{2}). There were 1,193 housing units at an average density of 27.4 per square mile (10.6/km^{2}). The racial makeup of the town was 97.44% White, 0.46% African American, 0.23% Native American, 0.57% Asian, 0.19% from other races, and 1.11% from two or more races. Hispanic or Latino of any race were 0.46% of the population.

There were 1,032 households, out of which 36.8% had children under the age of 18 living with them, 59.4% were married couples living together, 7.1% had a female householder with no husband present, and 29.2% were non-families. 23.2% of all households were made up of individuals, and 6.6% had someone living alone who was 65 years of age or older. The average household size was 2.54 and the average family size was 3.00.

In the town, the population was spread out, with 26.9% under the age of 18, 5.5% from 18 to 24, 29.8% from 25 to 44, 27.4% from 45 to 64, and 10.3% who were 65 years of age or older. The median age was 39 years. For every 100 females, there were 94.6 males. For every 100 females age 18 and over, there were 90.5 males.

The average annual household income in Thetford is $97,359, while the median household income sits at $72,292 per year. Residents aged 25 to 44 earn $75,833, while those between 45 and 64 years old have a median wage of $76,964. In contrast, people younger than 25 and those older than 65 earn less, at $75,250 and $61,451, respectively. (per https://www.point2homes.com/US/Neighborhood/VT/Thetford-Demographics.html). About 4.0% of families and 5.7% of the population were below the poverty line, including 8.8% of those under age 18 and 6.9% of those age 65 or over.

== Educational and cultural institutions ==
Thetford Elementary School on Thetford Hill serves town resident students from Kindergarten through 6th grade. The town then sends its middle and high school students primarily to Thetford Academy, a privately owned and publicly funded secondary school, in lieu of a public high school.

Open Fields School on Thetford Hill is an independent and alternative elementary school that serves children from kindergarten through 6th grade.

The Post Mills Church and the Vermontasaurus are cultural attractions in Post Mills.

== Notable people ==
- Augustus A. Bird, Wisconsin state legislator
- Malcolm Browne, Pulitzer Prize–winning journalist
- Mills O. Burnham, born in Thetford. Member, Florida House of Representatives
- William Closson, artist
- Ruth Dwyer, 1998 and 2000 Republican nominee for Governor
- John Eaton, brigadier general
- Louise Woodworth Foss, elocutionist
- Mahlon Hoagland (1921–2009), physician and biochemist, died in Thetford
- Alonzo Jackman, Norwich University professor and brigadier general
- Eugene Frederick Ladd, brigadier general
- Anne Lindbergh, author and daughter of Charles and Anne Morrow Lindbergh
- Gustavus Loomis, brigadier general
- Harvey Newcomb, clergyman and writer
- Grace Paley, National Book Award-winning fiction writer and poet
- Noel Perrin, essayist and professor at Dartmouth College
- Annie Proulx, author
- James S. Shapiro, professor of English at Columbia University
- Henry Wells, co-founder of Wells Fargo, American Express, and Wells College
- Dean Conant Worcester, zoologist, and authority on the Philippines
