= Larkin Covered Bridge =

Larkin Covered Bridge may refer to:

- Larkin Covered Bridge (Chester Springs, Pennsylvania), listed on the National Register of Historic Places in Chester County, Pennsylvania
- Larkin Covered Bridge (North Tunbridge, Vermont), listed on the National Register of Historic Places in Orange County, Vermont
