= Aloha Camp =

- U.S. National Register of Historic Places
- U.S. Historic district
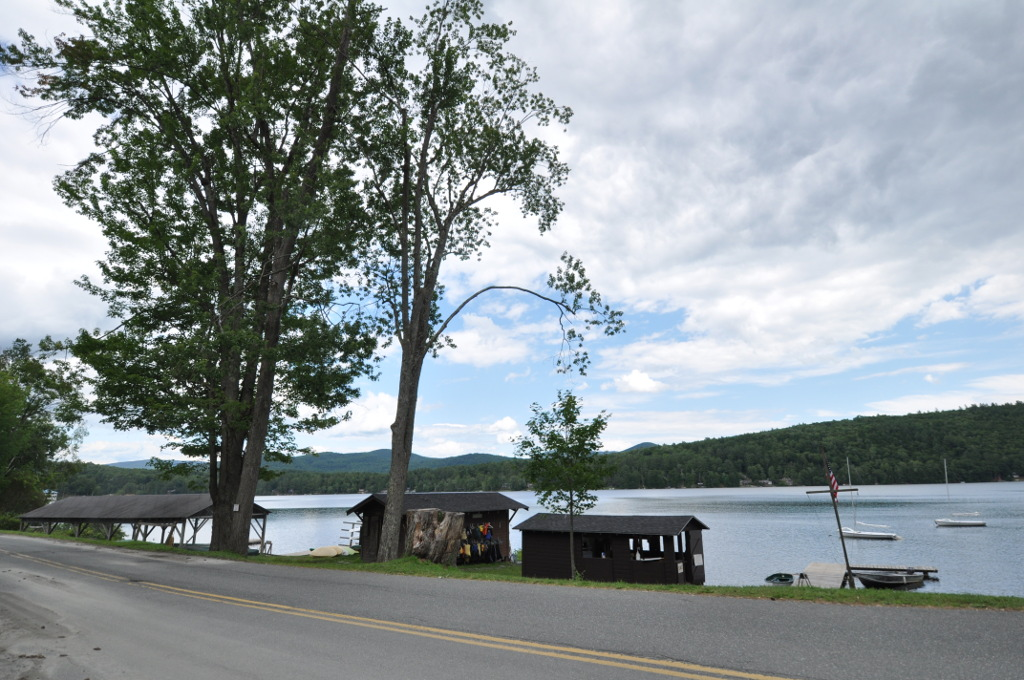
- View of Lake Morey from the camp

- Location within Vermont Location within the United States
- Location: 2039 Lake Morey Rd., Fairlee, Vermont
- Coordinates: 43°55′41″N 72°09′18″W
- Area: 131 acres (53 ha)
- Built: 1905
- Built by: Winship, Gustavus L.
- Architectural style: Queen Anne, Adirondack Rustic
- MPS: Organized Summer Camping in Vermont MPS
- NRHP reference No.: 03000892
- Added to NRHP: September 5, 2003

Aloha Camp is a summer camp for girls on Lake Morey in Fairlee, Vermont. Founded in 1905, it is the oldest girls' camp in the state. Open to children aged 12 to 17, it offers outdoor activities, arts and nature programs, and wilderness camping opportunities. The camp season is divided into two sessions of 3-1/2 weeks, running from late June to mid-August. The camp property is listed on the National Register of Historic Places.

== Facilities ==
Aloha Camp is located on central eastern Vermont, on the northwestern shore of Lake Morey, in the hills north of Fairlee village just west of the Connecticut River. It is laid out over 483 acres (195 ha) of land, divided in part by Lake Morey Road, which separates the bulk of the camp from its waterfront facilities. The camp layout is focused on the Main House and a number of activity buildings, with living quarters spread around the property. The Main House is an 1889 farmhouse, while the main activity buildings are repurposed agricultural outbuildings from the late 19th century. On the waterfront stands the Hale (pronounced in the Hawaiian manner, HAH-leh), an Adirondack style meeting hall with some Hawaiian stylistic touches.

== History ==
The camp was founded in 1905 by Harriet Farnsworth Gulick and Edward Leeds Gulick, both of whom grew up in missionary families with a history of service. The camp was named "Aloha" from the Hawaiian word meaning "welcome" (among other definitions). Edward Gulick was born and raised in Honolulu, and it is from this upbringing that the camp acquires its Hawaiian touches. The camp was so successful that the Gulicks soon opened Aloha Hive Camp on Lake Fairlee, for girls from 7 to 12 and Aloha Club on the shore of Lake Katherine in Piermont, New Hampshire, for girls from 17 to 70 (now closed), and in 1922 Lanakila Camp for boys, also on Lake Morey. The camps were run by members of the Gulick family until 1968, when the Aloha Foundation was established to continue their legacy.

== See also ==
- National Register of Historic Places listings in Orange County, Vermont
