= Aloha Hive Camp =

- U.S. National Register of Historic Places
- U.S. Historic district
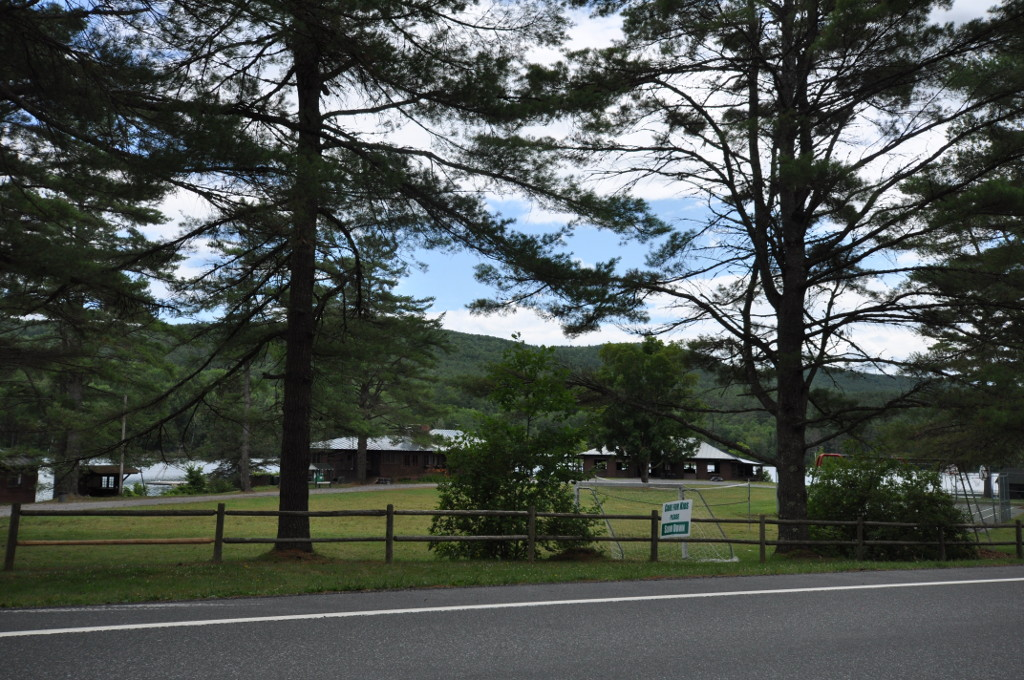

- Location within Vermont Location within the United States
- Location: 3295 VT Rt 244, Fairlee, Vermont 05045
- Coordinates: 43°53′32″N 72°13′8″W
- Area: 436.9 acres (176.8 ha)
- Built: 1915
- Architect: Reid, Edward C.
- Architectural style: Adirondack Rustic
- MPS: Organized Summer Camping in Vermont MPS
- NRHP reference No.: 03000893
- Added to NRHP: September 5, 2003

Aloha Hive Camp is a summer camp for girls on Lake Fairlee in West Fairlee, Vermont. Founded in 1915 as an expansion of Aloha Camp, it is open to girls aged 7 to 12, with two sessions between mid-June and late August. The camp operates on more than 400 acres (160 ha), offering a variety of outdoor activities as well as a rich arts and crafts program. The camp facilities were listed on the National Register of Historic Places in 2003.

== Facilities ==
Aloha Hive Camp is located in central eastern Vermont in the uplands west of the Connecticut River and south of Fairlee. Vermont Route 244 passes through the camp property, separating its upland areas from its waterfront. Its major facilities are located in the waterfront area, while residences (including large tents and cabins) are across the road, scattered on the hillside to the northwest. In addition to water-based sports, outdoor activities include tennis and horse riding, while indoor craft and other activities are conducted in buildings sprinkled around the campus. Many of the buildings are architecturally distinctive blends of Adirondack Rustic and Hawaiian bungalow style.

== History ==
The original Aloha Camp, located on nearby Lake Morey, was founded in 1905 by Harriet and Edward Gulick, both of whom grew up in missionary families with a history of service. The camp was named "Aloha" from the Hawaiian word meaning "welcome" (among other definitions). Edward Gulick was born and raised in Honolulu, and it is from this upbringing that the camp acquired its Hawaiian touches, which extend to the names of some of the buildings. The first camp was a great success, and the Gulicks acquired this property and opened the camp in 1915. It is the only one (out of four camps now operated by the Aloha Foundation) that is not based on a preexisting farmstead. The camp was operated by the Gulicks and then their descendants until 1968, when the foundation took over operations.

== See also ==
- Aloha Horizons Camp, also operated by Newcomers and also NRHP-listed
- National Register of Historic Places listings in Orange County, Vermont
