= Fairlee Railroad Depot =

- U.S. National Register of Historic Places
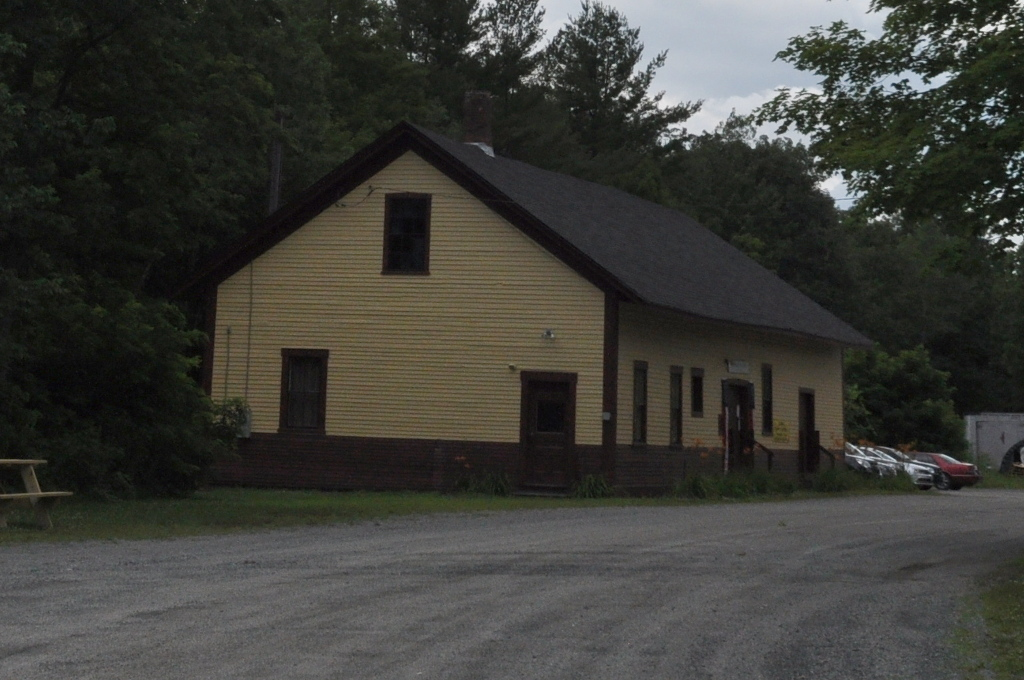

- Location within Vermont Location within the United States
- Location: Between US 5 and Boston and Maine Railroad Tracks, Fairlee, Vermont
- Coordinates: 43°54′23″N 72°8′40″W
- Area: 4.4 acres (1.8 ha)
- Built: 1848
- Built by: Connecticut & Passumpsic Rivers RR
- NRHP reference No.: 98000906
- Added to NRHP: July 23, 1998

The Fairlee Railroad Depot is a historic railroad station at 320 United States Route 5 in the village center of Fairlee, Vermont. Built in 1848 and used in active service until 1972, it is one of the few surviving first-generation railroad station buildings in the state. Now used as a retail space, it was listed on the National Register of Historic Places in 1998.

== Description and history ==
The former Fairlee Railroad Depot stands on the south side of US 5, adjacent to the now-disused railroad tracks that run between US 5 and the Connecticut River. It is accessed by a gravel drive in the shape of a broad U, with parking in front. It is a single-story rectangular wood-frame structure, with a gabled roof and clapboarded exterior. The street-facing facade has an irregular plan, with a number of doors and windows of differing sizes, reflecting a variety of historic functions. The building originally housed a lobby and passenger waiting area, occupying about one-third of its space, with the remainder used as a freight storage area.

The station was probably built in 1848 by the Connecticut and Passumpsic Rivers Railroad Company, chartered in 1843 to provide railroad service along the Connecticut River north of White River Junction. The station's precise construction date is not known due to a lack of documentation; the assessment of its age is based on architectural analysis. About 1870, the freight area was enlarged by construction of an addition, and the building's lobby and office area was remodeled around the turn of the 20th century. It is also likely that a bay window bumping out on the track side from the agent's office was added around the same time. Operation of the rail line was taken over by the Boston and Main Corporation in 1870, and it remained in service until 1972.

== See also ==
- National Register of Historic Places listings in Orange County, Vermont
