= Bayley Historic District =

Historic district in Vermont, United States

- U.S. National Register of Historic Places
- U.S. Historic district
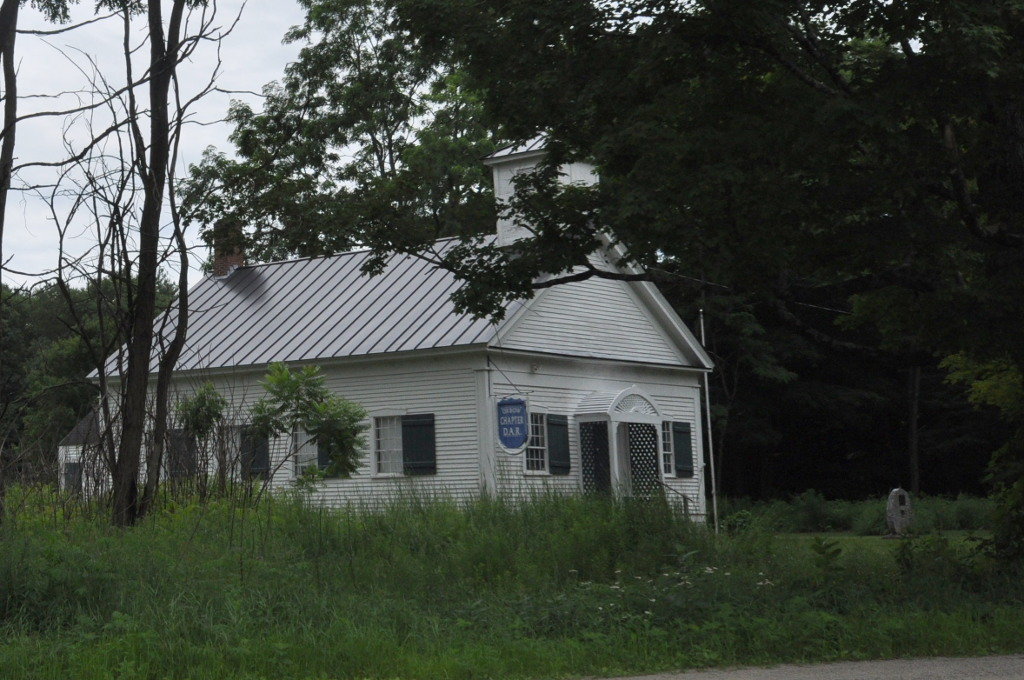
- The DAR chapterhouse, a former schoolhouse

- Location within Vermont Location within the United States
- Location: US 5 and Oxbow St., Newbury, Vermont
- Area: 20 acres (8.1 ha)
- Architectural style: Greek Revival, Federal, Cape Cod
- NRHP reference No.: 83003211
- Added to NRHP: July 28, 1983

The Bayley Historic District encompasses a small cluster of buildings in Newbury, Vermont, a number of which are associated with the historically prominent Bayley family. It includes some of the town's oldest buildings, and is where the founder of the town, Jacob Bayley, first settled and later died. The district is oriented along Oxbow Road west of United States Route 5 and north of the town's main village. It was listed on the National Register of Historic Places in 1983.

== Description and history ==
The town of Newbury was chartered in 1763, and was the first European settlement north of Charlestown, New Hampshire on the Connecticut River. Among its founders was Jacob Bayley, who rose to prominence as a local militia general, and as one of the driving forces behind the creation of the Bayley Hazen Military Road during the American Revolutionary War. The area where he settled is near a U-shaped meander in the river (named because of its resemblance to an oxbow, where the river's flood plain is particularly broad and fertile. While Bayley's house does not survive, that of his son does (on the north side of Oxbow Road, built c. 1785), and it is where he died in 1815.

The district is located about one mile north of the present village center of Newbury, at a point where US 5 bends from a north-south orientation to the northeast. Oxbow Road extends westward at this point, creating a triangular junction. The district extends westward from this junction to another triangular junction, where it bends south and Romance Lane continues further west. The district includes twelve houses, most dating to the 19th century, and a district schoolhouse, acquired in 1912 by the local chapter of the Daughters of the American Revolution. Most of the houses display architectural styling from the mid-to-late 19th century, although some, like the Bayley house, retain a Federal appearance. The Augustine/Kelley House, located near the corner of Romance and Oxbow, is a particularly fine example of Italianate architecture.

== See also ==
- National Register of Historic Places listings in Orange County, Vermont
