= Newbury, Vermont =

Newbury could be either of the following places in the U.S. state of Vermont:

- Newbury (town), Vermont
- Newbury (village), Vermont, within the town of Newbury
