= Fairlee Town Hall =

- U.S. National Register of Historic Places
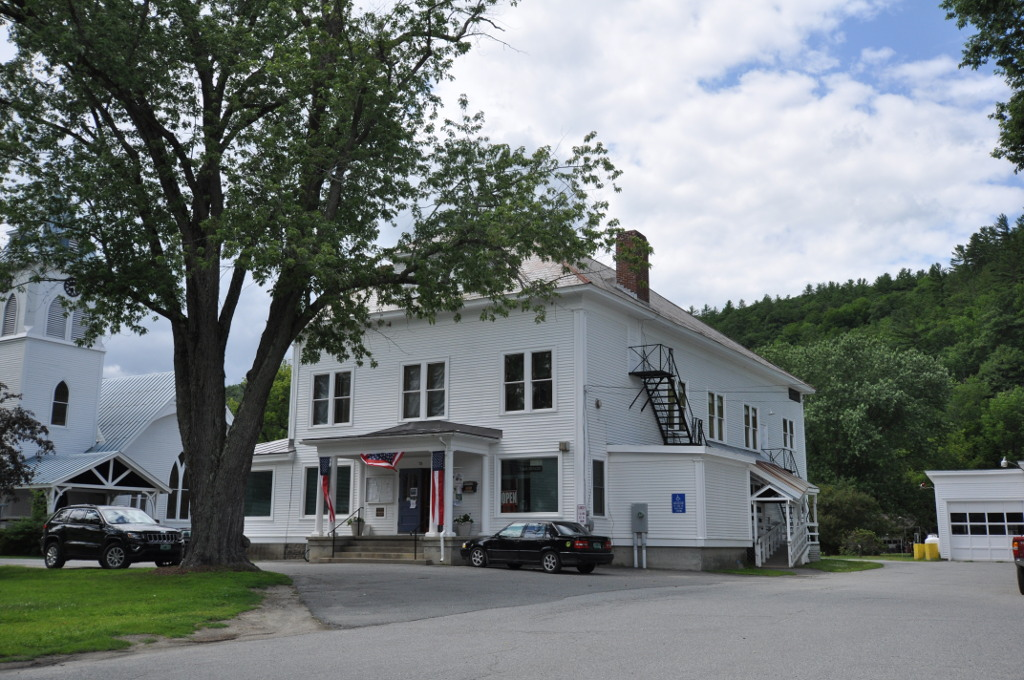

- Location within Vermont Location within the United States
- Location: 75 Town Common Rd., Fairlee, Vermont
- Coordinates: 43°54′30″N 72°8′32″W
- Area: less than one acre
- Built: 1913
- Architect: Donahue, John
- NRHP reference No.: 14000044
- Added to NRHP: February 25, 2014

Fairlee Town Hall, at 75 Town Common Road, is the municipal heart of Fairlee, Vermont. It was built in 1913 to a design by a local architect, replacing the old Fairlee Opera House, which was destroyed by fire in 1912. It is a fine example of Colonial Revival architecture, and is a focal point of the village center and the town's civic life. It was listed on the National Register of Historic Places in 2014.

== Description and history ==
Fairlee Town Hall is located on the north side of Town Common Road, a loop road on the north side of United States Route 5, the main road through Fairlee village. It is prominently sited between the community church and the local community store. It is a two-story wood-frame structure, with a hip roof, clapboarded exterior, and a poured concrete foundation finished above grade with rusticated concrete blocks. The east-facing front facade is symmetrical, with paired sash windows in the upper bays, and large fixed windows flanking the centered entrance on the ground floor. The entrance is sheltered by a hip-roofed porch supported by paired round columns with Colonial Revival styling. On either side of the main block are small single-story additions, one housing a storage vault. The interior of the building has an entry area with stairs to the second-floor auditorium and a small ticket booth (now storage closet). The first floor houses town offices, which have taken over space originally occupied by the library, and a meeting space and dining hall. The auditorium features a pressed tin ceiling, raised stage, and balcony. The painted curtain, ordered in 1912 for the opera house, depicts nearby Lake Morey. The building interior has retained virtually all of its original Colonial Revival trim.

On December 5, 1912, a fire raced through Fairlee's village center, destroying the Fairlee Opera House, church, library, and meetinghouse. The town acquired the opera house parcel and built the present structure in 1913. It was designed by John Donahue, a local architect with no other known commissions in the town. The side additions were added in the 1950s. Although the library has moved out, the building remains a focal point of community life, housing town offices and hosting events in the auditorium.

== See also ==
- National Register of Historic Places listings in Orange County, Vermont
