= Peabody Library =

Peabody Library could refer to

- Peabody Institute Library, a library at Johns Hopkins University in Baltimore, Maryland.
- Peabody Library (Thetford, Vermont)
- Peabody Institute Library (Peabody, Massachusetts)
- Peabody Township Library, a library in Peabody, Kansas
