= Morey Memorial Bridge =

- Samuel Morey Memorial Bridge
- U.S. National Register of Historic Places
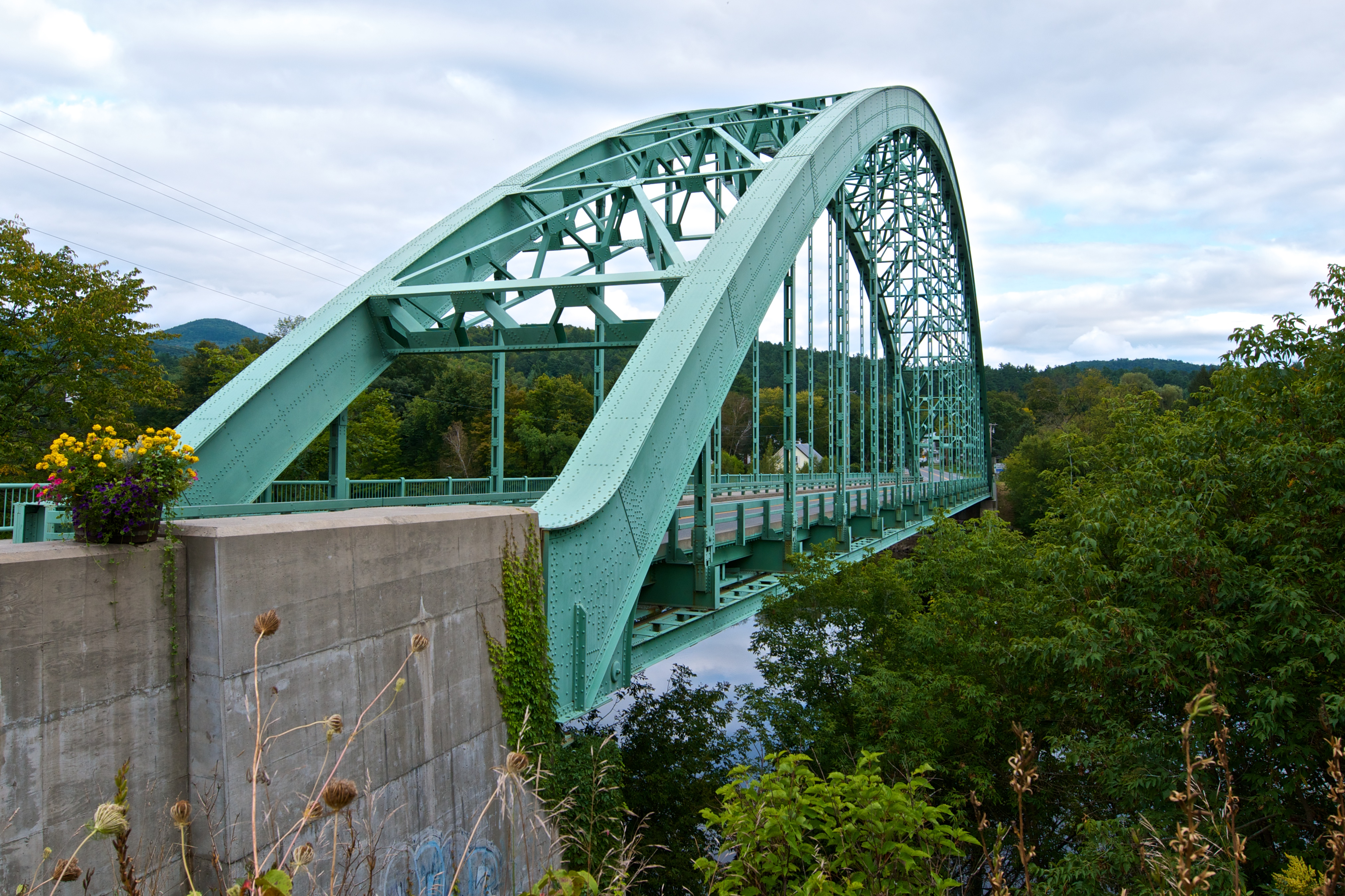

- Location within New Hampshire Location within Vermont Location within the United States
- Location: NH 25A over the Connecticut R., Orford, New Hampshire
- Coordinates: 43°54′25″N 72°8′23″W
- Area: less than one acre
- Built: 1936
- Built by: Hagen-Thibodeau Construction Co.
- Architect: John H. Wells
- Fabricator: American Bridge Company
- Architectural style: Steel Arch
- NRHP reference No.: 97001523
- Added to NRHP: December 8, 1997

The Samuel Morey Memorial Bridge is a historic bridge carrying New Hampshire Route 25A across the Connecticut River between Orford, New Hampshire and Fairlee, Vermont. The steel through-arch bridge was built in 1937–38 to replace an older wooden bridge which had been damaged by flooding in 1936. It spans 432 feet (132 m), stands about 35 feet (11 m) above the river, and its arches rise 85 feet (26 m) above the roadway. It rests on poured concrete abutments that have a light Art Deco or Moderne styling. Wing walls recede from the abutments into the banks in three stepped sections. Below the bridge in the river is visible some riprap, stone remnants of the old bridge's abutments and central pier. The bridge is of a "tied arch" design, in which the two arches are joined together by ties to distribute the active load. This is in contrast to the Justice Harlan Fiske Stone Bridge joining Brattleboro, Vermont and Chesterfield, New Hampshire, which was built about the same time, and distributes the active load to its abutments. The bridge components were manufactured by the American Bridge Company; construction was by Hagen-Thibodeau Construction Company at a contracted cost of just over $209,000.

The bridge is named for Samuel Morey, an early inventor of steamships and resident of both Orford and Fairlee.

The bridge was listed on the National Register of Historic Places in 1997.

== See also ==
- List of crossings of the Connecticut River
- List of bridges on the National Register of Historic Places in New Hampshire
- List of bridges on the National Register of Historic Places in Vermont
- National Register of Historic Places listings in Grafton County, New Hampshire
- National Register of Historic Places listings in Orange County, Vermont
