= Larkin Covered Bridge (North Tunbridge, Vermont) =

- U.S. National Register of Historic Places
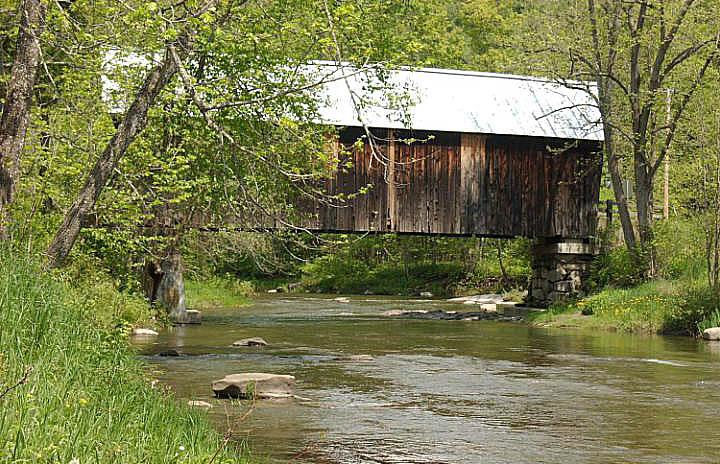

- Location within Vermont Location within the United States
- Location: Larkin Rd., Tunbridge, Vermont
- Coordinates: 43°55′22″N 72°27′56″W
- Area: 1 acre (0.40 ha)
- Built: 1902
- Architectural style: multiple kingpost truss
- NRHP reference No.: 74000327
- Added to NRHP: July 30, 1974

The Larkin Covered Bridge is a historic covered bridge, carrying Larkin Road across the First Branch White River in northern Tunbridge, Vermont. Built in 1902, it is one of the last documented covered bridges to be built in Vermont during the historic period of bridge construction, and is one of five covered bridges in the town. It was listed on the National Register of Historic Places in 1974.

== Description and history ==
The Larkin Covered Bridge stands a short way north of the village center of North Tunbridge, on Larkin Road a short way east of its junction with Vermont Route 110. It is a single-span multiple kingpost truss structure, 68 feet (21 m) long and 16 feet (4.9 m) wide, with a 13-foot (4.0 m) roadway (one lane). It rests on abutments of stone and concrete, and is covered by a metal roof. Its side walls are made of vertical board siding and have no openings. The portal ends and the interiors of the portals are also finished in vertical board siding. Although the trusses are set to form a rectangle, the portals are slightly skewed, giving the bridge a parallelogram shape on the outside.

The bridge was built in 1902, and is one of only two documented early 20th-century bridges in the state; the other is the Kingsbury Covered Bridge in nearby Randolph, built in 1904. The bridge is one of five in Tunbridge, which, when combined with one in Chelsea, form a remarkably dense concentration of covered bridges across a single waterway in the state.

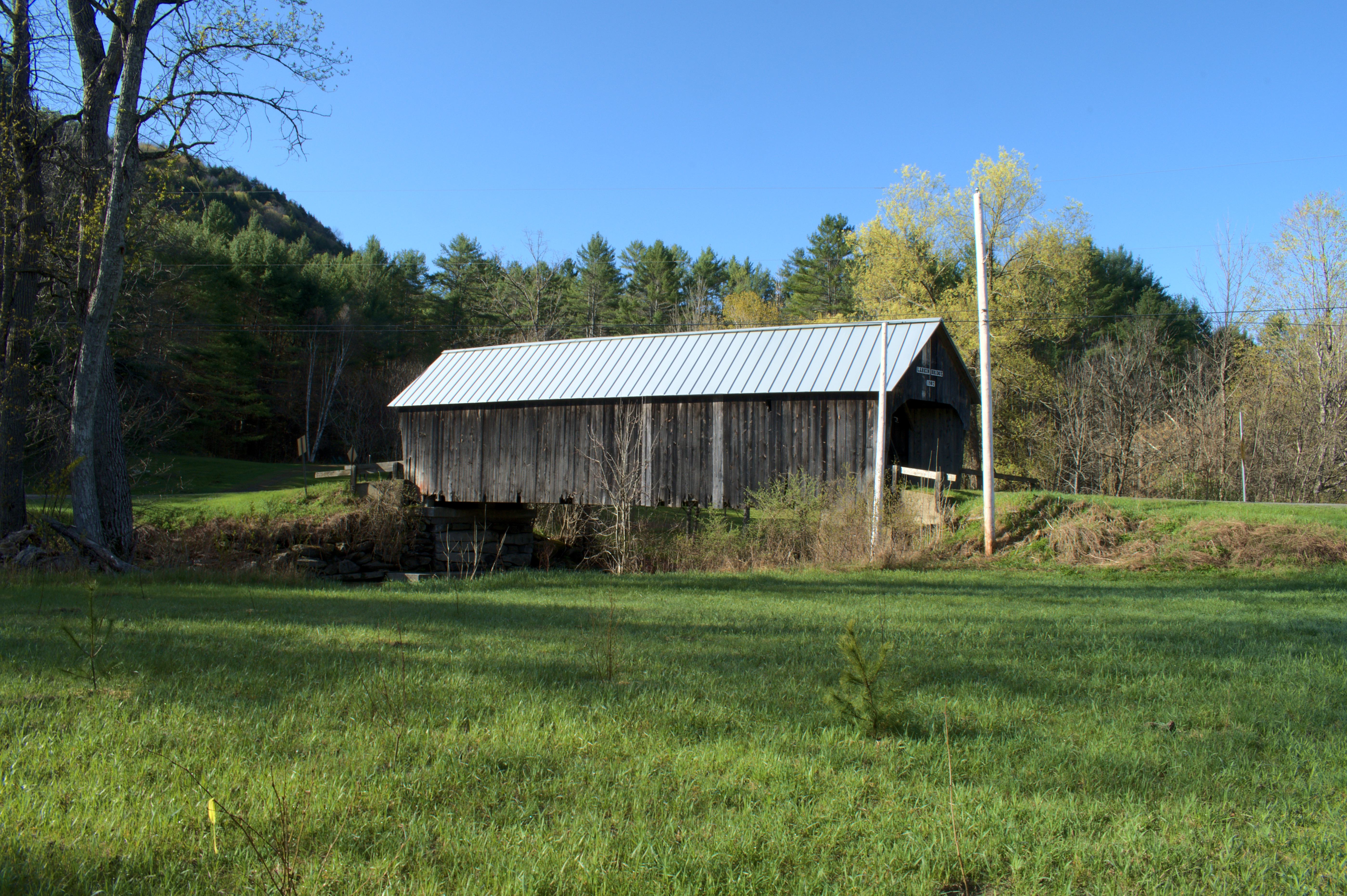

== See also ==
- National Register of Historic Places listings in Orange County, Vermont
- List of Vermont covered bridges
- List of bridges on the National Register of Historic Places in Vermont
