= Brock Hill Schoolhouse =

- U.S. National Register of Historic Places
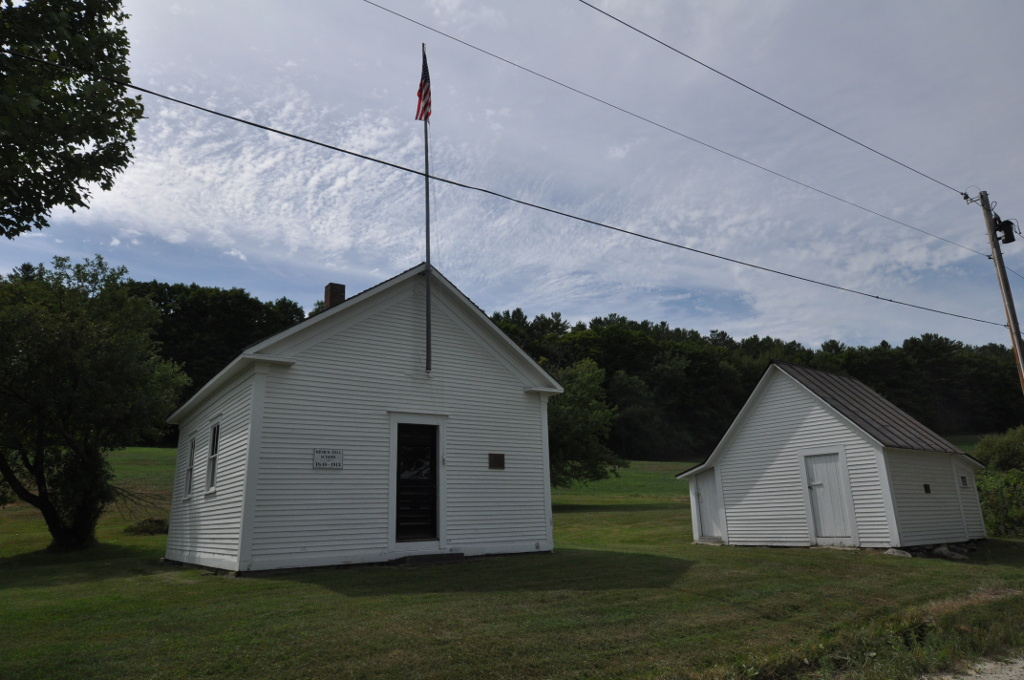

- Location within Vermont Location within the United States
- Location: North Rd., Newbury, Vermont
- Coordinates: 44°5′59″N 72°8′30″W
- Area: less than one acre
- Built: 1850
- Architectural style: Greek Revival
- MPS: Educational Resources of Vermont MPS
- NRHP reference No.: 03000738
- Added to NRHP: August 4, 2003

The Brock Hill Schoolhouse is a historic one-room schoolhouse on North Road in rural Newbury, Vermont. Built in 1850, it is a well-preserved example of a mid-19th century schoolhouse with Greek Revival styling. It was listed on the National Register of Historic Places in 2003.

== Description and history ==
The Brock Hill Schoolhouse stands in a rural area of western Newbury, on the west side of North Road. It is a modest single-story wood-frame structure, with a gabled cedar shingle roof, clapboard siding, and a modern concrete foundation which replaced an original fieldstone foundation. The main facade is unadorned except for a central entrance and a flagpole, mounted above the entrance. The sides and rear each have two window bays. The interior has a small coatroom, which is separated from the class room by a reproduction of an original divider wall. The interior walls are all finished in beadboard with a chair rail, painted in latex paint. A 19th-century wood stove stands in the center of the classroom.

The school was built sometime between 1802 and 1818, and served Newbury's District 8. Its name derives from its presence near the farm of Thomas Brock at the time of its initial construction; the land for the school was given by E.S. Brock when the school was rebuilt into its present shape in 1850. The school served the rural upland area's students until 1913. The school was apparently abandoned for a time, and was sold by the school district in 1960, seeing uses that may have included a hunting lodge. At one time it was fitted with plumbing and electricity, but these changes have been reversed. Adjacent to the schoolhouse is a surviving 19th-century privy and woodshed structure; both were the subject of restoration in the early 2000s.

== See also ==
- National Register of Historic Places listings in Orange County, Vermont
