= Aloha Horizons Camp =

- Camp Wyoda
- U.S. National Register of Historic Places
- U.S. Historic district
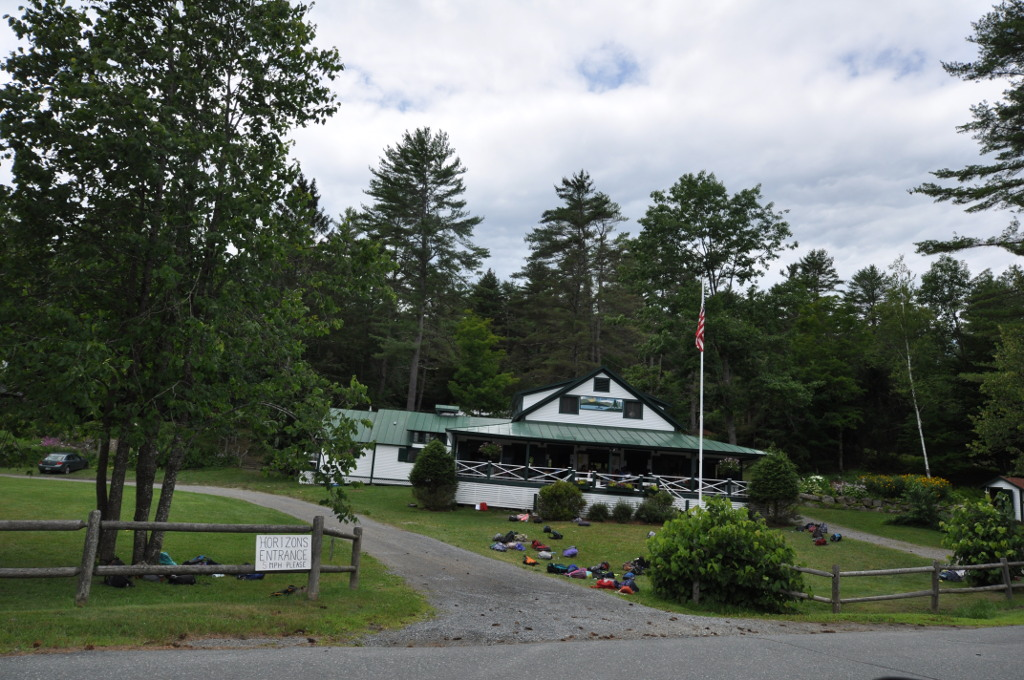

- Location within Vermont Location within the United States
- Location: 43 Middlebrook Rd., West Fairlee, Vermont
- Coordinates: 43°53′28″N 72°13′51″W
- Area: 97.8 acres (39.6 ha)
- Built: 1922
- Architectural style: Adirondack Rustic Bungalow
- MPS: Organized Summer Camping in Vermont MPS
- NRHP reference No.: 03000895
- Added to NRHP: September 5, 2003

Aloha Horizons Camp is a summer camp for boys and girls on Lake Fairlee in West Fairlee, Vermont. Opened in 1921 as Camp Wyoda, its property was acquired by the Aloha Foundation in 1997, and is now operated by that organization as a day camp for local children and vacationers staying in the area. Camp is divided into three two-week sessions; activities include water sports, land sports, and arts and crafts. The camp property, organized around a former farmstead, was listed on the National Register of Historic Places in 2003 for its well-kept collection of surviving early camp architecture.

== Facilities ==
Aloha Horizons Camp is located on the northern shore of Lake Fairlee, near the mouth of Middle Brook. The camp's 98 acres (40 ha) are divided by both Vermont Route 244 which parallels the lakeshore, and Middlebrook Road, which follows the stream uphill. Most of the camp buildings are located west of Middlebrook Road and north of VT 244, with athletic facilities east of Middlebrook and the waterfront area south of VT 244. Its main buildings, including the Main Building, Infirmary, Arts & Crafts Building, and Nature Building, date from the camp's first two decades, and are built in the Adirondack Rustic style. The waterfront includes a boathouse and a bleachers for watching events.

Camp Wyoda was founded in 1916 by Harvey and Margaret McLean Newcomer, and was first located in leased facilities on Passumpsic Point, east of the present location. In 1921, the Newcomers purchased the 19th-century Thompson farmstead, as the camp had outgrown the first facilities. Traces of the Thompson farm buildings exist in the Main Building and Arts & Crafts Building, both of which were extensively rebuilt in 1947. Camp Wyoda was operated by three generations of the Newcomer family, the last of which sold the camp to the Aloha Foundation in 1997. That organization, which runs three other camps in the area, including Aloha Hive Camp east of this camp, now operates it as a day camp for small children, and an outing-based camp for older children.

== See also ==
- National Register of Historic Places listings in Orange County, Vermont
