= Goshen Church =

Historic church in Vermont, United States

- U.S. National Register of Historic Places
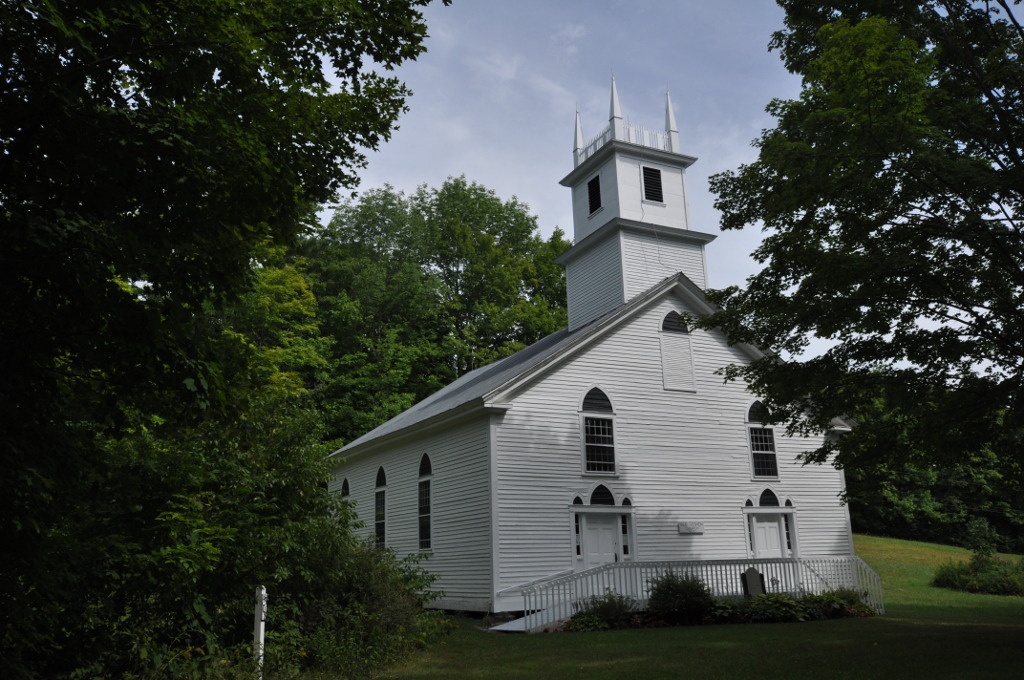

- Location within Vermont Location within the United States
- Location: Goshen Rd., Bradford, Vermont
- Coordinates: 44°2′52″N 72°8′54″W
- Area: less than one acre
- Built: 1834
- Architectural style: Greek Revival
- NRHP reference No.: 76000141
- Added to NRHP: September 03, 1976

Goshen Church is a historic church on Goshen Road in Bradford, Vermont. Built in 1834, it is a fine and little-altered example of vernacular Greek Revival architecture in a rural setting. It was listed on the National Register of Historic Places in 1976.

== Description and history ==
The Goshen Church is located in a rural upland area of western Bradford, on the east side of Goshen Road a short way south of its junction with Upper Rogers Road. It is a single-story wood-frame structure, with a gabled roof and clapboarded exterior. Its front facade is symmetrical, with two identical entrances, each framed by sidelight windows and topped by a triple tympanum with a central Gothic louver flanked by smaller similar ones. Above each entry is a sash window, also topped by a Gothic louver, and a similar opening, now sided over, is set in the gable end. A two-stage square tower rises from the roof ridge, with a plain first stage, and a smaller second belfry stage with rectangular louvered openings. The tower is topped by a railing with corner pinnacles. The interior retains original box pews and pulpit, the latter finished in a simulation of marble.

The church congregation was founded in the early 19th century, by citizens of Bradford and Newbury who had broken from more strongly Calvinist Baptist congregations. The location of their church, in Bradford near the town line with Newbury, was chosen as a convenience to its parishioners. The building has never been fitted with modern amenities such as electricity, and is now used for services only in the summertime.

== See also ==
- National Register of Historic Places listings in Orange County, Vermont
