= Oxbow Historic District =

Historic district in Vermont, United States

- U.S. National Register of Historic Places
- U.S. Historic district
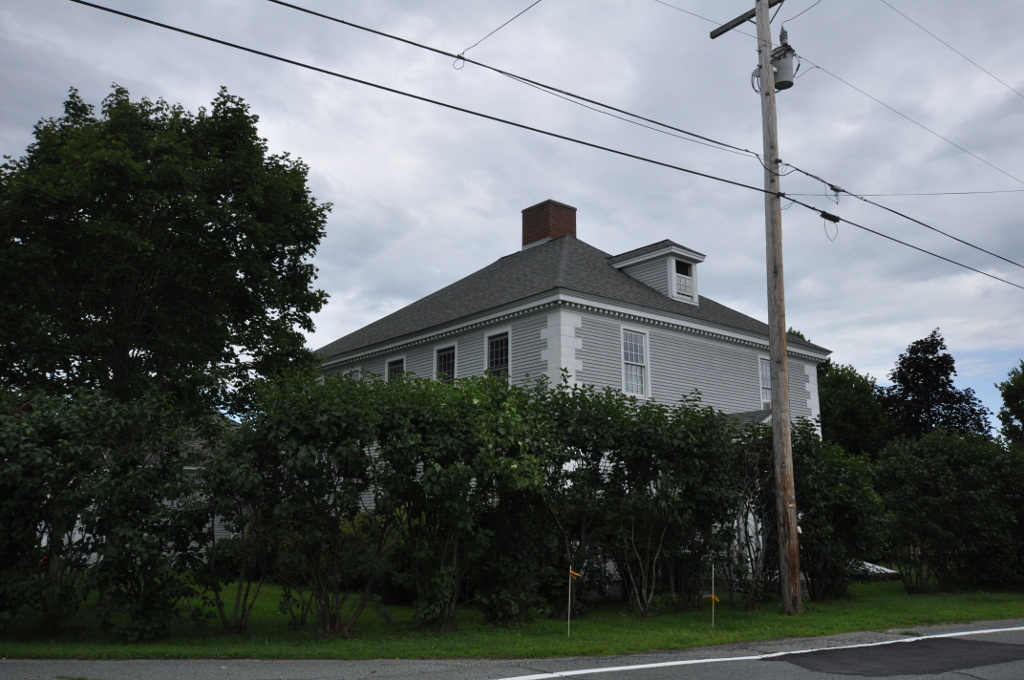

- Location within Vermont Location within the United States
- Location: US 5, Newbury, Vermont
- Coordinates: 44°5′42″N 72°2′50″W
- Area: 40 acres (16 ha)
- Architectural style: Georgian, Federal, Classical Revival
- NRHP reference No.: 83003215
- Added to NRHP: July 28, 1983

The Oxbow Historic District encompasses a well-preserved rural agricultural area on United States Route 5 in northern Newbury, Vermont. It was one of the first areas to be settled in the town, and includes seven agricultural properties, with six farmhouses built before 1835 and a number of surviving 19th-century farm outbuildings. It was listed on the National Register of Historic Places in 1983.

== Description and history ==
The town of Newbury is a rural community located on the upper reaches of the Connecticut River in central eastern Vermont. It was, along with neighboring Haverhill, New Hampshire, one of the first colonial settlements above Charlestown, New Hampshire, with early settlement beginning in the 1760s. The Newbury side had particularly rich agricultural land in an area known locally as the Great Oxbow, created by a large bend in the river. The northern end of the oxbow became a nexus of agricultural settlement. This area was joined to other river settlements by a road (now US 5). One of the houses still standing in the area was built in 1775 by Thomas Johnson, one of the early settlers.

US 5 follows a roughly north-south route in the area, and thus bypasses the large curve of the river oxbow. The historic district covers roughly the northern half of US 5 between its closest approaches to the northern and southern ends of the bend. The area includes seven properties originally developed as farmsteads, six of which were built before 1835. These are all relatively modest examples of Federal and Greek Revival architecture, except the Johnson-Bailey House, which is one of Newbury's few surviving examples of Georgian architecture. The seventh house, is a vernacular house built about 1870. Most of the surviving farm outbuildings (barns and sheds) date to the second half of the 19th century, while there are also a few 20th-century garages.

== See also ==
- National Register of Historic Places listings in Orange County, Vermont
