= National Register of Historic Places listings in Orange County, Vermont =

Location of Orange County in Vermont

This is a list of the National Register of Historic Places listings in Orange County, Vermont.

This is intended to be a complete list of the properties and districts on the National Register of Historic Places in Orange County, Vermont, United States. Latitude and longitude coordinates are provided for many National Register properties and districts; these locations may be seen together in a map.

There are 64 properties and districts listed on the National Register in the county, including 1 National Historic Landmark.

This National Park Service list is complete through NPS recent listings posted April 24, 2026.

Contents: Counties in Vermont
Addison - Bennington - Caledonia - Chittenden - Essex - Franklin - Grand Isle - Lamoille - Orange - Orleans - Rutland - Washington - Windham - Windsor

== Current listings ==
	Name on the Register	Image	Date listed	Location	City or town	Description
1	Allis State Park	Allis State Park	March 29, 2002 (#02000280)	VT 65; 44°02′41″N 72°38′12″W	Brookfield	
2	Aloha Camp	Aloha Camp	September 5, 2003 (#03000892)	2039 Lake Morey Rd. 43°55′41″N 72°09′18″W	Fairlee	
3	Aloha Hive Camp	Aloha Hive Camp	September 5, 2003 (#03000893)	846 VT 244; 43°53′32″N 72°13′08″W	West Fairlee	
4	Bayley Historic District	Bayley Historic District	July 28, 1983 (#83003211)	US 5 and Oxbow St. 44°05′11″N 72°03′09″W	Newbury	
5	Bedell Covered Bridge	Bedell Covered Bridge	May 28, 1975 (#75002171)	Crossed the Connecticut River between Haverhill, New Hampshire and Newbury, Vermont; 44°02′53″N 72°04′20″W	Newbury	Blown away by high winds in 1979.
6	Bradford Village Historic District	Bradford Village Historic District	May 28, 1975 (#75000142)	Residential area along Main, Depot, Pleasant, High, and Mill Sts., Wrights Ave., Goshen Rd., and U.S. Route 5; 43°59′52″N 72°07′29″W	Bradford	
7	Braintree Hill Meetinghouse and Cemetery	Braintree Hill Meetinghouse and Cemetery	September 9, 2024 (#100010811)	2756 Braintree Hill Road; 43°58′09″N 72°41′18″W	Braintree	
8	Braley Covered Bridge	Braley Covered Bridge	June 13, 1974 (#74000236)	East of Randolph off VT 14, over the Second Branch of the White River; 43°55′42″N 72°33′26″W	Randolph	
9	Bridge 22	Bridge 22	November 3, 2010 (#10000878)	Town Highway 27 (Creamery Rd); 43°59′17″N 72°07′48″W	Bradford	Metal Truss, Masonry, and Concrete Bridges in Vermont MPS
10	Brock Hill Schoolhouse	Brock Hill Schoolhouse	August 4, 2003 (#03000738)	North Rd. 44°05′59″N 72°08′30″W	Newbury	
11	Brookfield Village Historic District	Brookfield Village Historic District	March 28, 1974 (#74000237)	Sunset Lake area 44°02′35″N 72°36′07″W	Brookfield	
12	Camp Billings	Camp Billings	January 11, 2006 (#05001524)	1452 VT 244; 43°53′25″N 72°13′58″W	Thetford	
13	Camp Wyoda	Camp Wyoda	September 5, 2003 (#03000895)	43 Middlebrook Rd. 43°53′28″N 72°13′51″W	West Fairlee	Now known as Aloha Horizons Camp
14	Chandler Music Hall and Bethany Parish House	Chandler Music Hall and Bethany Parish House	July 16, 1973 (#73000196)	71 Main St. 43°55′32″N 72°39′57″W	Randolph	
15	Elwin Chase House	Elwin Chase House	November 2, 1977 (#77000099)	366 Topsham-Corinth Rd. 44°07′12″N 72°14′21″W	Topsham	
16	Chelsea Village Historic District	Chelsea Village Historic District	September 29, 1983 (#83003212)	N. and S. Main, Jail, School, Court, and Church Sts., and Maple and Highland Aves. 43°59′23″N 72°26′51″W	Chelsea	
17	Cilley Covered Bridge	Cilley Covered Bridge	September 10, 1974 (#74000238)	Southwest of Tunbridge over the First Branch of the White River; 43°52′59″N 72°30′17″W	Tunbridge	
18	Congregational Church of Chelsea	Congregational Church of Chelsea	September 3, 1976 (#76000140)	Chelsea Green; 43°59′19″N 72°26′48″W	Chelsea	
19	Depot Square Historic District	Depot Square Historic District	May 29, 1975 (#75000143)	Both sides of Main, Pleasant and Salisbury Sts., and both sides of the Central Vermont Railway tracks 43°55′23″N 72°39′58″W	Randolph	
20	Ely Boston & Maine Railroad Depot	Ely Boston & Maine Railroad Depot	December 9, 1994 (#94001448)	U.S. Route 5 south of its junction with VT 244; 43°52′24″N 72°10′40″W	Fairlee	
21	Fairlee Railroad Depot	Fairlee Railroad Depot	July 23, 1998 (#98000906)	Between U.S. Route 5 and the Boston and Maine Railroad tracks 43°54′23″N 72°08′40″W	Fairlee	
22	Fairlee Town Hall	Fairlee Town Hall	February 25, 2014 (#14000044)	75 Town Common Rd. 43°54′30″N 72°08′32″W	Fairlee	
23	Flint Covered Bridge	Flint Covered Bridge	September 10, 1974 (#74000239)	Northeast of Tunbridge off VT 110, over the First Branch of the White River; 43°56′56″N 72°27′31″W	Tunbridge	
24	Foundry Bridge	Foundry Bridge	July 11, 2007 (#07000692)	Foundry Rd. 43°54′52″N 72°28′37″W	Tunbridge	
25	Gifford Covered Bridge	Gifford Covered Bridge	July 30, 1974 (#74000240)	South of Randolph off VT 14 over the Second Branch of the White River; 43°55′00″N 72°33′25″W	East Randolph	
26	Goshen Church	Goshen Church	September 3, 1976 (#76000141)	North of Bradford on Goshen Rd. 44°02′52″N 72°08′54″W	Bradford	
27	Hayward and Kibby Mill	Hayward and Kibby Mill	March 12, 1992 (#92000094)	Spring Rd. at the First Branch of the White River; 43°53′29″N 72°29′31″W	Tunbridge	
28	Howe Covered Bridge	Howe Covered Bridge	September 10, 1974 (#74000241)	South of Tunbridge off VT 110, over the First Branch of the White River; 43°51′53″N 72°29′58″W	Tunbridge	
29	Kimball Public Library	Kimball Public Library	March 14, 1985 (#85000568)	67 Main St. 43°55′31″N 72°39′58″W	Randolph	
30	Kingsbury Covered Bridge	Kingsbury Covered Bridge	July 30, 1974 (#74000242)	South of East Randolph off VT 14 over the Second Branch of the White River; 43°52′52″N 72°34′56″W	East Randolph	
31	Lanakila Camp	Lanakila Camp	September 5, 2003 (#03000894)	2899 Lake Morey Rd. 43°56′12″N 72°08′30″W	Fairlee	
32	Larkin Covered Bridge	Larkin Covered Bridge	July 30, 1974 (#74000327)	Northeast of North Tunbridge off VT 110 over the First Branch of the White River; 43°55′22″N 72°27′56″W	Tunbridge	
33	Lyme–East Thetford Bridge	Lyme–East Thetford Bridge	March 27, 2020 (#100005159)	VT 113 / East Thetford Rd. over the Connecticut R. 43°48′44″N 72°10′59″W	Thetford	Extends into Grafton County, New Hampshire
34	Mari-Castle	Mari-Castle	May 24, 1990 (#90000796)	41 S. Main St. 43°55′03″N 72°40′06″W	Randolph	
35	Asa May House	Asa May House	April 7, 1993 (#93000240)	Town Highway 4 (Blood Brook Rd.) southeast of West Fairlee Center; 43°55′33″N 72°12′32″W	West Fairlee	
36	Mill Covered Bridge	Mill Covered Bridge	July 30, 1974 (#74000243)	West of VT 110, over the First Branch of the White River; 43°53′29″N 72°29′31″W	Tunbridge	
37	The Samuel Morey Memorial Bridge	The Samuel Morey Memorial Bridge	December 8, 1997 (#97001523)	NH 25A over the Connecticut River; 43°54′25″N 72°08′23″W	Fairlee	Extends into Grafton County, New Hampshire
38	Justin Smith Morrill Homestead	Justin Smith Morrill Homestead	October 15, 1966 (#66000795)	South of the Common; 43°51′46″N 72°22′33″W	Strafford	Gothic Revival home of Justin Smith Morrill, Vermont Representative and Senator known for the 1862 and 1890 Morrill Land-Grant Colleges Acts.
39	Moxley Covered Bridge	Moxley Covered Bridge	September 10, 1974 (#74000244)	South of Chelsea over the First Branch of the White River; 43°57′25″N 72°27′49″W	Chelsea	
40	Newbury Town House	Newbury Town House	July 28, 1983 (#83003213)	Scotch Hollow Rd. 44°06′22″N 72°07′34″W	Newbury	
41	Newbury Village Historic District	Newbury Village Historic District	August 4, 1983 (#83003214)	Main, Pulaski, Cross, and Pine Sts., Chapel Rd. and Romance Lane; 44°04′40″N 72°03′29″W	Newbury	
42	Marvin Newton House	Marvin Newton House	June 11, 1980 (#80000337)	Ridge Rd. 44°01′27″N 72°36′07″W	Brookfield	
43	Oxbow Historic District	Oxbow Historic District	July 28, 1983 (#83003215)	US 5; 44°05′42″N 72°02′50″W	Newbury	
44	Peabody Library	Peabody Library	September 27, 1984 (#84003466)	7299 VT 113; 43°53′07″N 72°15′40″W	Thetford	
45	Piermont Bridge	Piermont Bridge	June 6, 2001 (#01000630)	NH 25 over the Connecticut River; 43°58′40″N 72°06′45″W	Bradford	Extends into Grafton County, New Hampshire
46	Post Mills Church	Post Mills Church	October 29, 1992 (#92001489)	VT 244 east of its junction with VT 113; 43°53′14″N 72°15′08″W	Thetford	
47	Randolph Center Historic District	Randolph Center Historic District	November 21, 1974 (#74000245)	West and Main Sts. 43°56′18″N 72°36′46″W	Randolph	
48	South Newbury Village Historic District	South Newbury Village Historic District	July 28, 1983 (#83003216)	U.S. Route 5 and Doe Hill Rd. 44°02′44″N 72°05′11″W	Newbury	
49	South Tunbridge Methodist Episcopal Church	South Tunbridge Methodist Episcopal Church	March 2, 2001 (#01000215)	VT 110 1/3 mile north of the Royalton town line 43°51′24″N 72°30′07″W	Tunbridge	
50	Strafford Village Historic District	Strafford Village Historic District	June 20, 1974 (#74000246)	Roughly both sides of the Morrill Highway and Sharon Brook Rd. 43°51′54″N 72°22′44″W	Strafford	
51	Stratton's Inn	Stratton's Inn	July 29, 1982 (#82001703)	East of Brookfield on East St. 44°03′00″N 72°35′00″W	Brookfield	
52	Thetford Center Covered Bridge	Thetford Center Covered Bridge	September 17, 1974 (#74000247)	Over the Ompompanoosuc River; 43°49′55″N 72°15′12″W	Thetford	
53	Thetford Center Historic District	Thetford Center Historic District	March 5, 1998 (#98000220)	Roughly along VT 113, Tucker Hill Rd., and Buzzell Bridge Rd. 43°49′46″N 72°15′02″W	Thetford	
54	Thetford Hill Historic District	Thetford Hill Historic District	October 27, 1988 (#88002134)	Roughly VT 113 and Academy Rd. 43°49′01″N 72°13′44″W	Thetford	
55	Thetford Hill State Park	Thetford Hill State Park	February 14, 2002 (#02000029)	622 Academy Rd. 43°48′43″N 72°14′24″W	Thetford	
56	Tunbridge Village Historic District	Tunbridge Village Historic District	June 24, 1994 (#94000635)	Roughly, along VT 110 and adjacent roads including Town Road 45 and Spring and Stafford Rds. 43°53′15″N 72°29′42″W	Tunbridge	
57	Union Village Covered Bridge	Union Village Covered Bridge	September 17, 1974 (#74000248)	Over the Ompompanoosuc River; 43°47′19″N 72°15′17″W	Thetford	
58	Waits River Schoolhouse	Waits River Schoolhouse	September 27, 1988 (#88002656)	VT 25 north of Waits River; 44°05′29″N 72°17′09″W	Waits River	
59	Wells River Graded School	Wells River Graded School	September 3, 1976 (#76000142)	Main St. 44°09′06″N 72°02′44″W	Wells River	
60	Wells River Village Historic District	Wells River Village Historic District	July 28, 1983 (#83003217)	Main, Center, Grove, Cross, and Water Sts. 44°09′08″N 72°02′53″W	Wells River	
61	West Fairlee Center Church	West Fairlee Center Church	June 21, 2002 (#02000662)	3870 Middlebrook Rd. 43°56′34″N 72°13′31″W	West Fairlee	
62	West Newbury Village Historic District	West Newbury Village Historic District	September 15, 1983 (#83003218)	Snake and Tucker Mtn. Rds. 44°03′44″N 72°07′29″W	Newbury	
63	Harlie Whitcomb Farm	Harlie Whitcomb Farm	September 11, 1979 (#79000224)	George Street past the cemetery 44°09′23″N 72°24′03″W	Orange	Listed in Barre vicinity
64	Wildwood Hall	Wildwood Hall	October 2, 1978 (#78000237)	Moore's Hill Rd. 44°03′54″N 72°04′24″W	Newbury	

== See also ==
- List of National Historic Landmarks in Vermont
- National Register of Historic Places listings in Vermont
