= Elwin Chase House =

Historic house in Vermont, United States

- U.S. National Register of Historic Places
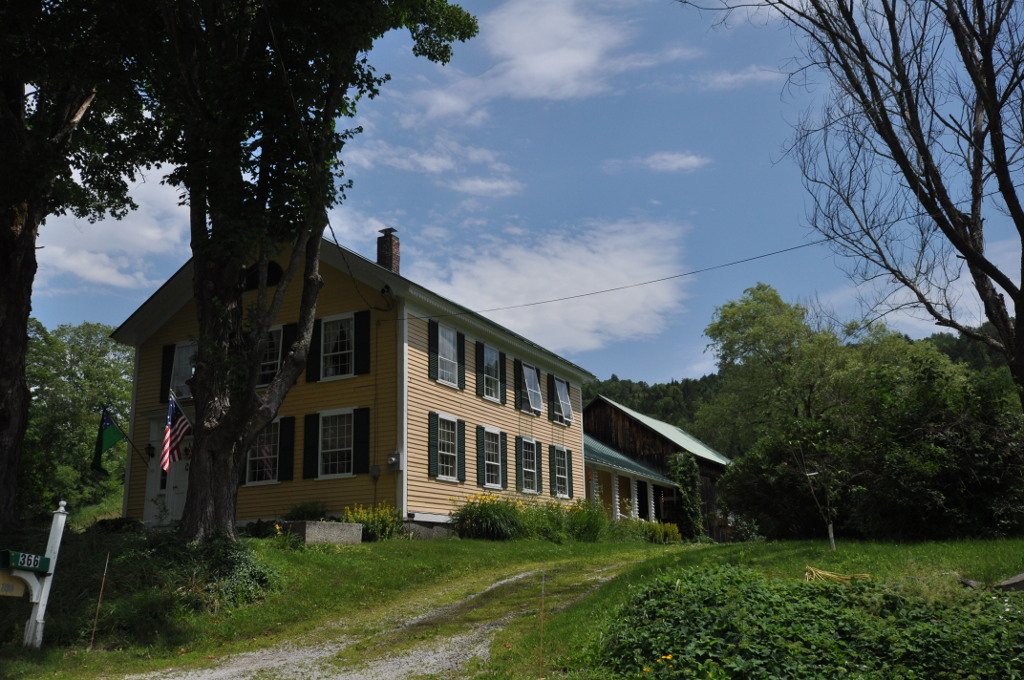

- Location within Vermont Location within the United States
- Location: 366 Topsham-Corinth Rd., East Topsham, Vermont
- Coordinates: 44°7′12″N 72°14′21″W
- Area: 1.5 acres (0.61 ha)
- Built: 1830
- Architectural style: Greek Revival
- NRHP reference No.: 77000099
- Added to NRHP: November 2, 1977

The Elwin Chase House is a historic house at 366 Topsham-Corinth Road in Topsham, Vermont. Built about 1830, it is a well-preserved example of Greek Revival architecture in a rural context. It is most prominent as one of the only known sites in Vermont of the artwork drawn by Rufus Porter, who worked as an itinerant muralist around the time of the house's construction. The house was listed on the National Register of Historic Places in 1977.

== Description and history ==
The Elwin Chase House stands a short way south of the village of East Topsham, on the east side of the Topsham-Corinth Road. It is a 2 1/2-story wood-frame structure, with a front-facing gabled roof and clapboarded exterior. The main facade, facing toward the street, is three bays wide, with the entrance in the leftmost bay. It is flanked by sidelight windows and pilasters, and is topped by a transom window and entablature. A Federal style fan adorns the gable above, and a narrow strip of bargeboard is set in the eaves. The sides have four window bays, and an ell and barn extend to the rear. The interior has relatively plain woodwork, the newel post of the main stair being a Victorian-era replacement of the original. The stairwell is adorned with a series of murals on virtually all of its surfaces. These are stylistically attributed to the itinerant muralist Rufus Porter, and include what appears to be a fragmentary signature.

The house's exact construction date is unknown, but is placed around 1830 based on architectural stylistic evidence. The murals, which were at the time of the property's listing on the National Register the only known example of Porter's work in the state, are dated to the early 1830s, based on the presence of the frigate USS Potomac, which had in that period made news for its circumnavigation of the globe.

== See also ==
- National Register of Historic Places listings in Orange County, Vermont
