= Bridge 22 =

- U.S. National Register of Historic Places
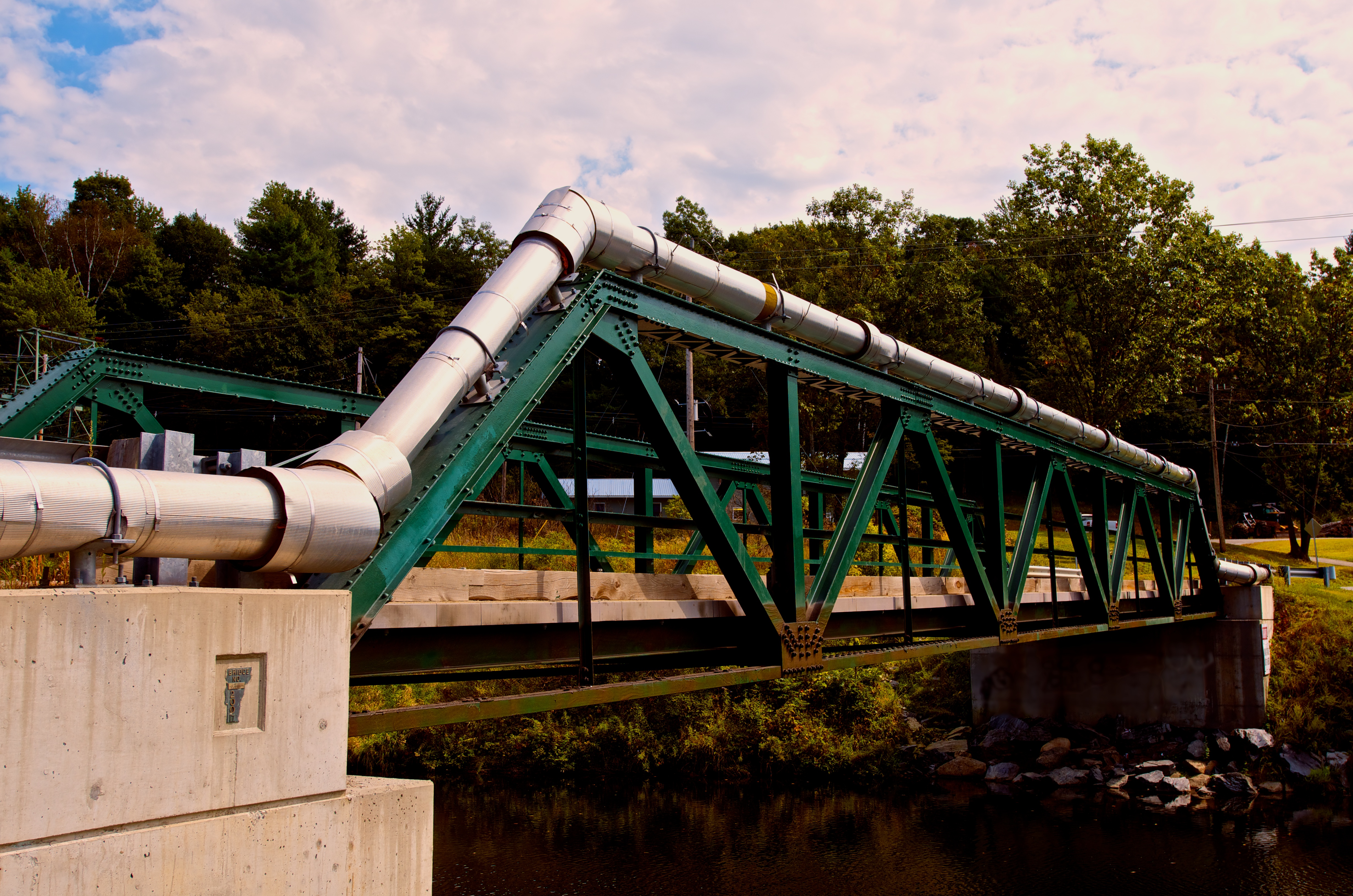

- Location within Vermont Location within the United States
- Location: Old Creamery Rd., Bradford, Vermont
- Coordinates: 43°59′17″N 72°7′48″W
- Area: 1 acre (0.40 ha)
- Built: 1934
- Built by: American Bridge Company
- Architectural style: Pony truss
- NRHP reference No.: 10000878
- Added to NRHP: November 3, 2010

Bridge 22, also known as the Creamery Bridge, is a historic pony truss bridge, carrying Old Creamery Road across the Waits River in Bradford, Vermont. Built in 1934, it is well-preserved late example of a bridge style then passing out of fashion. It was listed on the National Register of Historic Places in 2010.

== Description and history ==
Bridge 22 is located at the southern end of Bradford village, where Old Creamery Road runs generally south to connect that end of the village to Vermont Route 25. The Waits River at that point flows generally northward before turning east to empty into the Connecticut River. The bridge is a single-span Warren pony truss, 105 feet (32 m) in length. It has a total width of 17 feet 6 inches (5.33 m), and a roadway width of 16 feet 1 inch (4.90 m). The deck, made of metal panels paved over in asphalt, is supported by I-beams. A water utility pipe is attached to the southern truss.

The bridge was built in 1934, its trusses manufactured by the American Bridge Company at its plant in Ambridge, Pennsylvania. Although the Warren pony truss was a common bridge type in Vermont into the 1920s, changing manufacturing techniques and standardization of bridge types by the state meant that its use was in decline in the state when this bridge was built. It replaced a wooden bridge at the same location, and the truss form was probably selected due to the impracticality of designs for this location that required the supporting elements to be beneath the bridge deck. Some of the labor for the bridge's construction may have been given by townspeople in lieu of property tax payments.

== See also ==
- National Register of Historic Places listings in Orange County, Vermont
- List of bridges on the National Register of Historic Places in Vermont
