= Stratton's Inn =

Historic house in Vermont, United States

- U.S. National Register of Historic Places
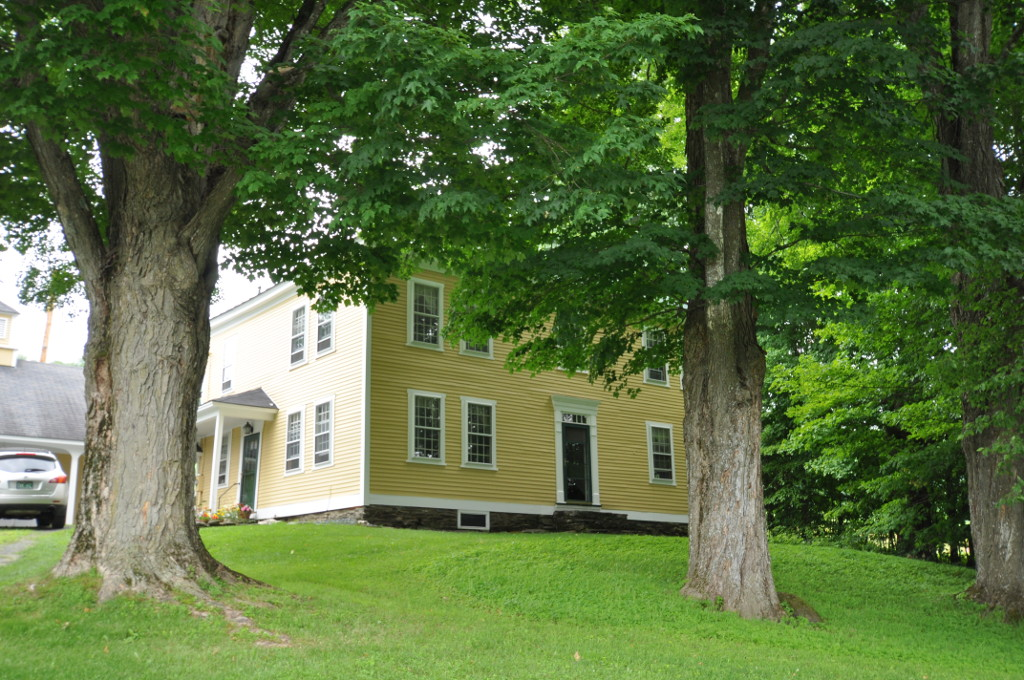

- Location within Vermont Location within the United States
- Location: East St., Brookfield, Vermont
- Coordinates: 44°2′50″N 72°35′5″W
- Area: 1 acre (0.40 ha)
- Built: 1795
- Built by: Stratton, Ebenezer
- Architectural style: Federal
- NRHP reference No.: 82001703
- Added to NRHP: July 29, 1982

Stratton's Inn is a historic house on East Street in Brookfield, Vermont. Built in the late 1790s as a tavern located at the junction of two locally important roads, it is a fine example of Federal period architecture, most importantly preserving the inn's original tap room. It was listed on the National Register of Historic Places in 1982.

== Description and history ==
Stratton's Inn stands in what is now a remote and rural area of northeastern Brookfield, on the west side of East Street. Just north of the house is a broad bend in the road, from which a former turnpike right-of-way is still discernible, heading southeast. The former inn is a two-story wood-frame structure, with a hip roof, large central chimney, clapboarded exterior, and stone foundation. The principal entrance is on the east-facing facade, which is five bays wide. The entrance is framed by slender Federal period pilasters, and is topped by a transom window and corniced entablature. Similar but less elaborate entrances are also found on the south and west sides. A 20th-century three-bay garage is attached at a setback on the south side. The interior of the house follows a fairly typical early Federal central-chimney plan, with a narrow entry vestibule with winding staircase in front of chimney, large chambers on either side, and a long chamber behind. The northern chamber was originally finished as a parlor, while the southern one was the tap room. Near the entrance to the vestibule is a closet, providing access to storage under the stairs, from which it is surmised the tavern host dispensed drinks.

The inn was most likely built sometime between 1795 and 1798 by Ebenezer Stratton, one of Brookfield's first settlers. It was located along what was known as Paine's Turnpike, a major north–south route. It is possible that a sign labelled "E. Stratton's", found in the Smithsonian Museum of American History, originally hung here. The property served as a stagecoach stop at least until 1838, and remained in the hands of Stratton's descendants until 1890, operated mainly as a farm.

== See also ==
- National Register of Historic Places listings in Orange County, Vermont
