= West Newbury Village Historic District =

Historic district in Vermont, United States

- U.S. National Register of Historic Places
- U.S. Historic district
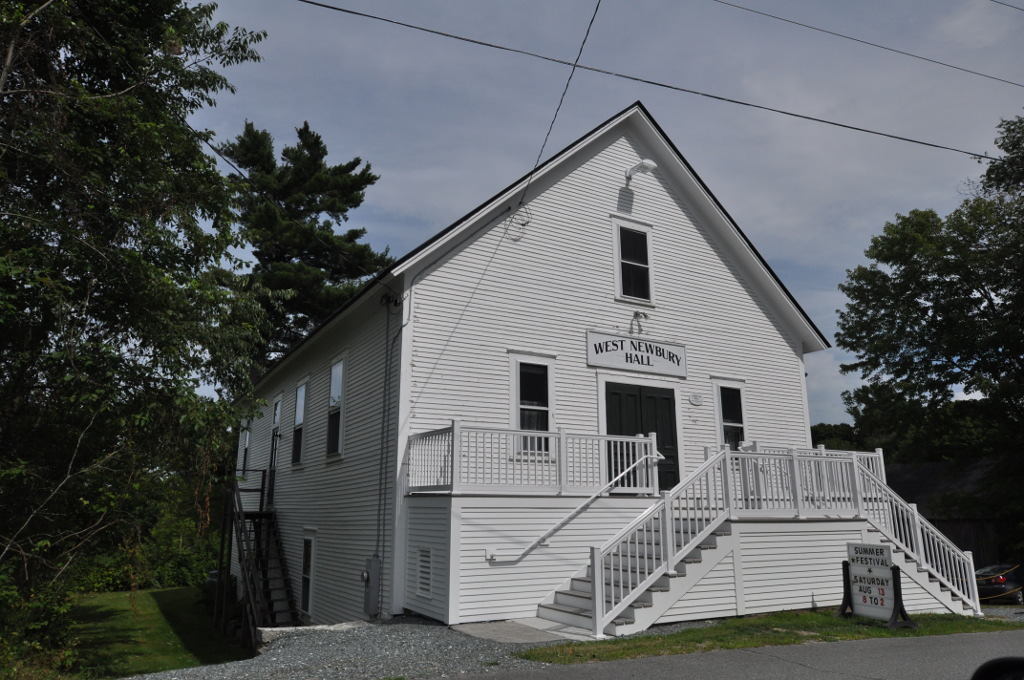
- West Newbury Community Hall

- Location within Vermont Location within the United States
- Location: Snake and Tucker Mtn. Rds., West Newbury, Vermont
- Coordinates: 44°3′44″N 72°7′29″W
- Area: 16 acres (6.5 ha)
- Architectural style: Greek Revival
- NRHP reference No.: 83003218
- Added to NRHP: September 15, 1983

The West Newbury Village Historic District encompasses the modest rural country village of West Newbury, Vermont. It is located at the junction of Tucker Mountain, Snake, and Tyler Farm Roads, and is relatively little altered since its 19th-century development. It was listed on the National Register of Historic Places in 1983.

== Description and history ==
The West Newbury area was first settled by colonists in the 1770s, with the small village center growing in the following decades to serve the outlying agricultural area of southern Newbury. The local meetinghouse was built in 1833, and in 1841 Samuel Eastman built the store (now converted to apartments) at the junction of Tyler Farm and Snake Roads. The village is home to Newbury's only surviving district schoolhouse, now owned by the local historical society. Unlike Newbury's other villages, which benefited from their location on the Connecticut River and later on the railroad, the village has always been of modest rural character.

The historic district is basically linear, running from the junction of Tyler Farm and Snake Roads southward along Tyler Farm Road to Rogers Hill Road. Its buildings are of wood-frame construction, one and two stories in height, and almost all were built before 1900. Its few 20th century intrusions, including the c. 1975 post office, are architecturally sympathetic to the village's historic character.

== See also ==
- National Register of Historic Places listings in Orange County, Vermont
