= South Newbury Village Historic District =

Historic district in Vermont, United States

- U.S. National Register of Historic Places
- U.S. Historic district
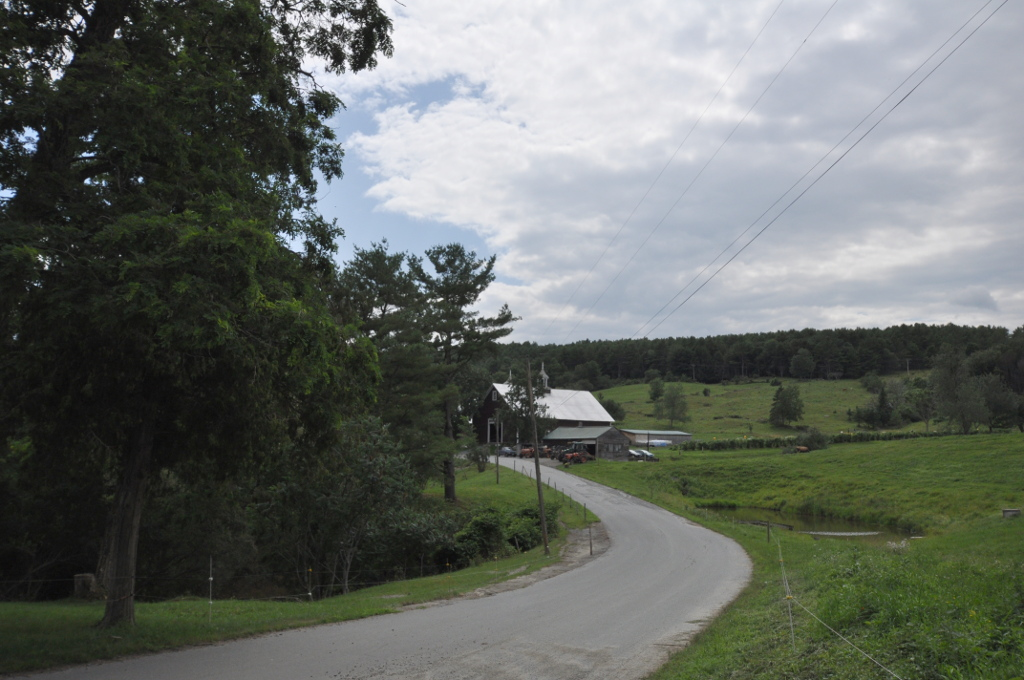

- Location within Vermont Location within the United States
- Location: Doe Hill Rd. (Old US 5) and Doe Ln., Newbury, Vermont
- Coordinates: 44°2′44″N 72°5′11″W
- Area: 12 acres (4.9 ha)
- Architectural style: Greek Revival, Federal, Gothic Revival
- NRHP reference No.: 83003216
- Added to NRHP: July 28, 1983

The South Newbury Village Historic District encompasses the surviving elements of a small industrial village in southern Newbury, Vermont. It includes five residences and several outbuildings, most of which are agricultural in character, representing the area's shift in use in the 20th century. The district was listed on the National Register of Historic Places in 1983.

== Description and history ==
The village of South Newbury consists of a small collection of residences and some associated outbuildings. It is located at the junction of Doe Lane and Doe Hill Road, the latter being a former alignment of United States Route 5, which now runs just to the east of the village. Four of the five houses are clustered at the junction, while the fifth, part of a farm complex, is located a short way to the south. The houses are unusually architecturally diverse for such a small collection, in some cases combining elements of different styles. Two of the houses in particular were built in the early 19th century as Federal style houses, and have substantial Italianate elements that were added later.

South Newbury is one of the first places to be settled in the town of Newbury. The early residents were drawn to the area by the rich farmlands of the Connecticut River floodplain, and by the water power offered by Hall's Brook, which descends to the river east of the district. The first mill on the brook was built in 1764, and in the 19th century several mills lined its banks, all since destroyed either by fires or spring floods. The village also benefited as a stop on the stagecoach route that ran along the river. Development was effectively arrested when the new alignment of US 5 bypassed the area.

== See also ==
- National Register of Historic Places listings in Orange County, Vermont
