= Lanakila Camp =

- U.S. National Register of Historic Places
- U.S. Historic district
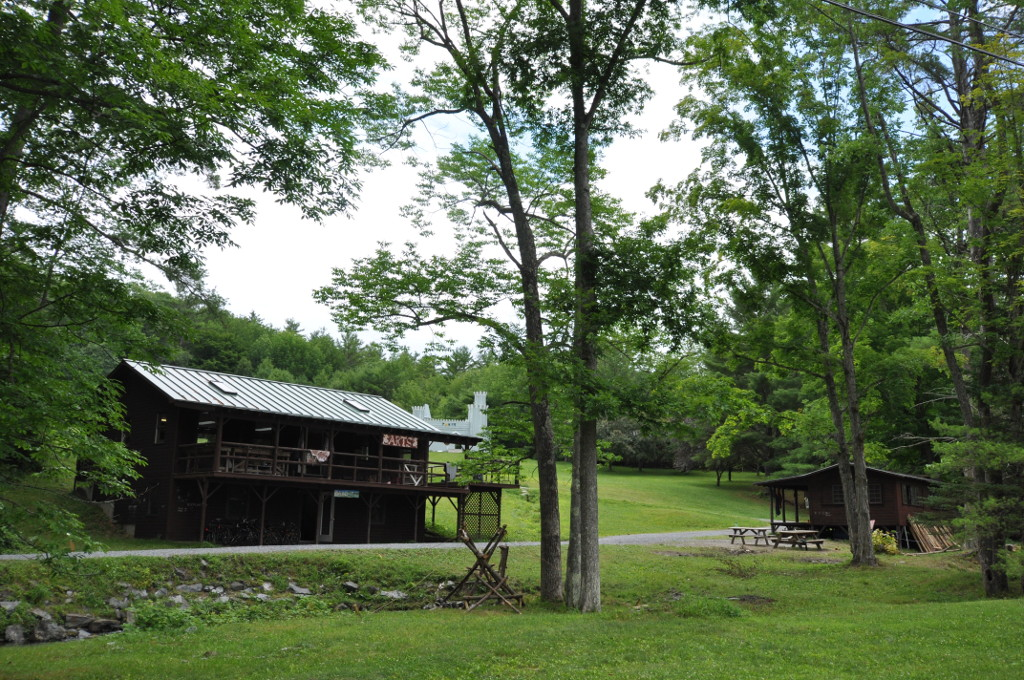

- Location within Vermont Location within the United States
- Location: 2899 Lake Morey Rd., Fairlee, Vermont
- Coordinates: 43°56′12″N 72°8′30″W
- Area: 348.6 acres (141.1 ha)
- Built: 1922
- Architectural style: Adirondack Rustic
- MPS: Organized Summer Camping in Vermont MPS
- NRHP reference No.: 03000894
- Added to NRHP: September 5, 2003

Lanakila Camp is a private summer camp for boys aged 8–14 on Lake Morey in Fairlee, Vermont. Founded in 1922 on the grounds of a 19th-century farm property, it is one of the state's older organized camps, with a significant number of period buildings in the Adirondack rustic style. The camp offers an array of outdoor activities, including water, field sports, and hiking, as well as indoor arts programs, all generally infused with an educational purpose. It has a full 7-week session (late June to early August), as well as two three-and-a-half-week sessions (Running from late June to mid-July, as well as mid-July to early August). During the off-season, its facilities are used as the Hulbert Outdoor Center, an educational center for adults, children, school groups and special events including things like weddings. The camp property was listed on the National Register of Historic Places in 2003.

== Facilities ==
Lanakila Camp is located at the northern tip of Lake Morey, on a parcel of nearly 483 acres (195 ha) that extends up the hillside to the west. The campus facilities are located on either side of Lake Morey Road, the town road which encircles the lake. Its visual focal point is the large Main House, where the camp offices and dining hall are found. It is located on the north side of Lake Morey Road, where it makes a sharp turn from south to east, with Brushwood Road running west. The house's oldest portions date to about 1850, when the property was a farm, with a barn of similar period located behind it serving as the camp's main assembly hall. Camper residential facilities are divided into clusters, most located within view of the road, and consist of a combination of cabins and tents set on platforms. Other facilities include a boat shed, craft building, infirmary, and a castle, as well as several structures and buildings that have been built by campers over the years.

== History ==
The camp was founded in 1922 by Harriet Farnsworth Gulick and Edward Leeds Gulick, which was the third camp they established on either Lake Morey or Lake Fairlee. All 6 camps are now operated by the Aloha Foundation, founded to continue the Gulick's legacy. The property, a farm since about 1850, was first used as a girls' camp called Camp Kia-Ora between 1917 and 1922. That camp was not a financial success, and its owners sold to the Gulicks, who at that time already had more than ten years' experience in operating camps. The camp was run by appointees of the Gulicks, and later their children, until the Aloha Foundation was organized in 1968.

== Foundation ==
The Aloha Foundation has EIN 03–6016791 as a 501(c)(3) Public Charity; in 2024 it reported total revenue of $12,308,925 and total assets of $60,457,562. It describes its mission in official documents: "The Aloha Foundation, Inc. is a non-profit educational institution with the objectives of fostering personal growth, self-reliance, self-confidence, cooperation, and a sense of community in people of all ages and backgrounds."

== See also ==
- National Register of Historic Places listings in Orange County, Vermont
