= Harlie Whitcomb Farm =

- U.S. National Register of Historic Places
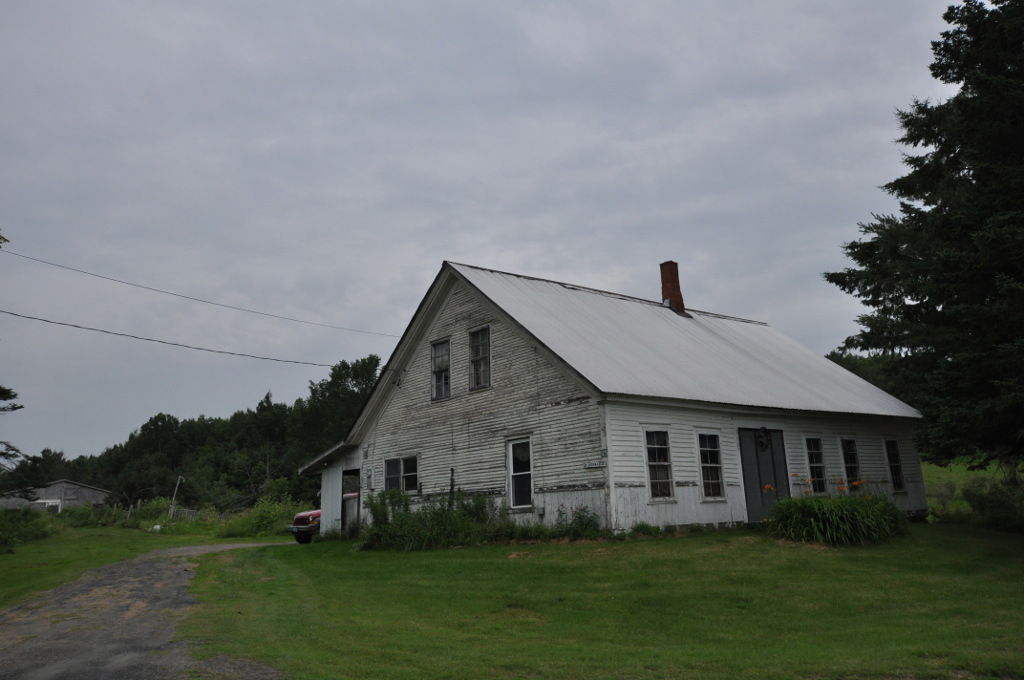

- Location within Vermont Location within the United States
- Location: George St. past the cemetery, Orange, Vermont
- Coordinates: 44°9′23″N 72°24′3″W
- Area: 10 acres (4.0 ha)
- Built: 1905
- Architectural style: Octagon Mode
- NRHP reference No.: 79000224
- Added to NRHP: September 11, 1979

The Harlie Whitcomb Farm is a historic farm property on George Street in Orange, Vermont. The property, which includes a pre-1869 farmhouse, was listed on the National Register of Historic Places in 1979, because the 10-acre (4.0 ha) property also included an octagonal three-story barn, one of a very few known in the state. The barn has since been demolished.

== Description and history ==
The Harlie Whitcomb Farm is located about 0.5 miles (0.80 km) north of Orange's village center, on the south side of George Street a short way north of the town cemetery. The 10 acres (4.0 ha) of the farm are set between the cemetery and a rise to the west. The house is a 1-1/2 story Cape style house, with a metal roof and clapboarded exterior. Its front facade is six bays wide, with the main entrance in the left center bay. A garage and shed stand on the property south of the house.

In 1905-06, Harlie Whitcomb built a three-story eight-sided barn at a remove to the south of the house. Because of the relatively unaltered condition of the barn, which had by the 1970s fallen out of regular use, the property was listed on the National Register of Historic Places in 1979. Octagonal barns underwent a revival around the turn of the 20th century, as an efficient means of feeding and caring for dairy cattle, and this barn was one of a dwindling number of surviving octagonal barns from that period. The barn has since been demolished, and only foundational remnants survive.

== See also ==
- National Register of Historic Places listings in Orange County, Vermont
