= Newbury Town House =

- U.S. National Register of Historic Places
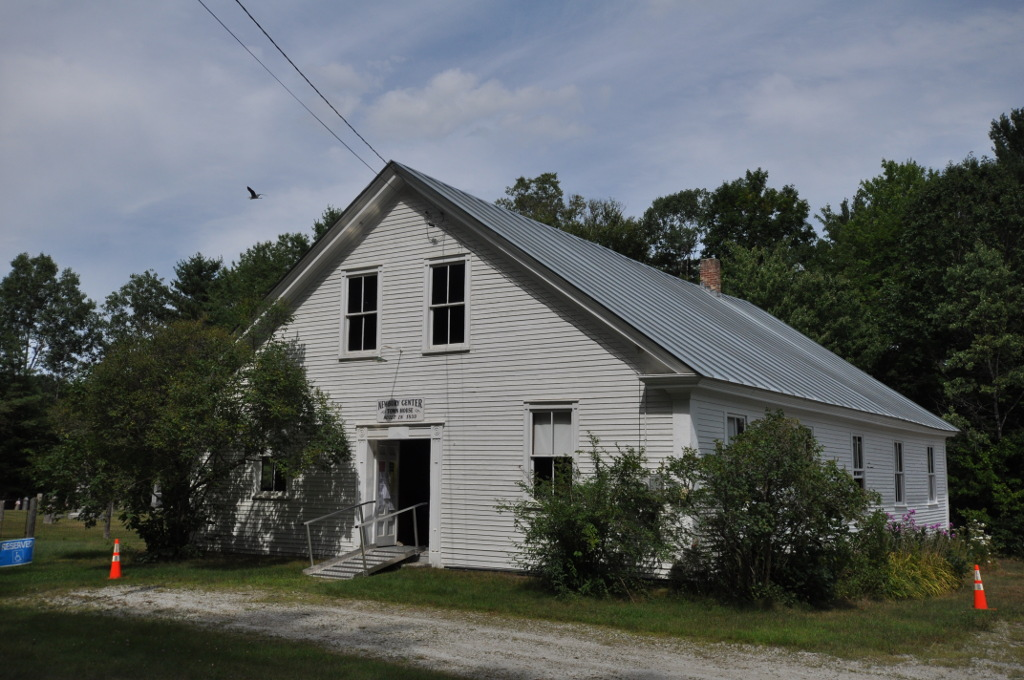

- Location within Vermont Location within the United States
- Location: Scotch Hollow Rd., Newbury, Vermont
- Coordinates: 44°6′22″N 72°7′34″W
- Area: 0.7 acres (0.28 ha)
- Built: 1839
- Architectural style: Greek Revival, Federal
- NRHP reference No.: 83003213
- Added to NRHP: July 28, 1983

The Newbury Town House is a historic government building on Scotch Hollow Road in Newbury, Vermont. Built in 1839, it is a well-preserved and little-altered example of an early Greek Revival town hall. It was listed on the National Register of Historic Places in 1983. While no longer used for town meetings, it is still owned by the town and used for other civic purposes, included elections.

== Description and history ==
The Newbury Town House is located near the geographic center of Newbury, in a rural setting on the east side of Scotch Hollow Road, roughly midway between its junctions with Fish Pond Road and Halls Lake Road. It is set back from the road, between two cemetery parcels. It is a fairly plain single-story wood-frame structure, with a gabled roof, clapboarded exterior, and stone foundation. The principal adornment on the exterior is its entrance surround, which consists of pilasters rising to bullseye blocks and a header with a protruding central pyramidal section flanked by paneled blocks. The pilasters are decorated with early Greek Revival fretwork. The interior of the hall retains original pew-like benches, and rustic horizontal board wainscoting.

The hall was built in 1839, as a centralized place to hold town meetings, which had previously been held in individual homes or barns. The land was donated by Charles George, who also gave some of the lumber for its framing. Its entry surround is based on patterns published by Asher Benjamin. The building has seen relatively little alteration, having mainly had only basic maintenance and minor repairs. It is no longer used for town meetings, but is used as a polling place and for other types of meetings.

== See also ==
- National Register of Historic Places listings in Orange County, Vermont
