= Peabody Library (Thetford, Vermont) =

- U.S. National Register of Historic Places
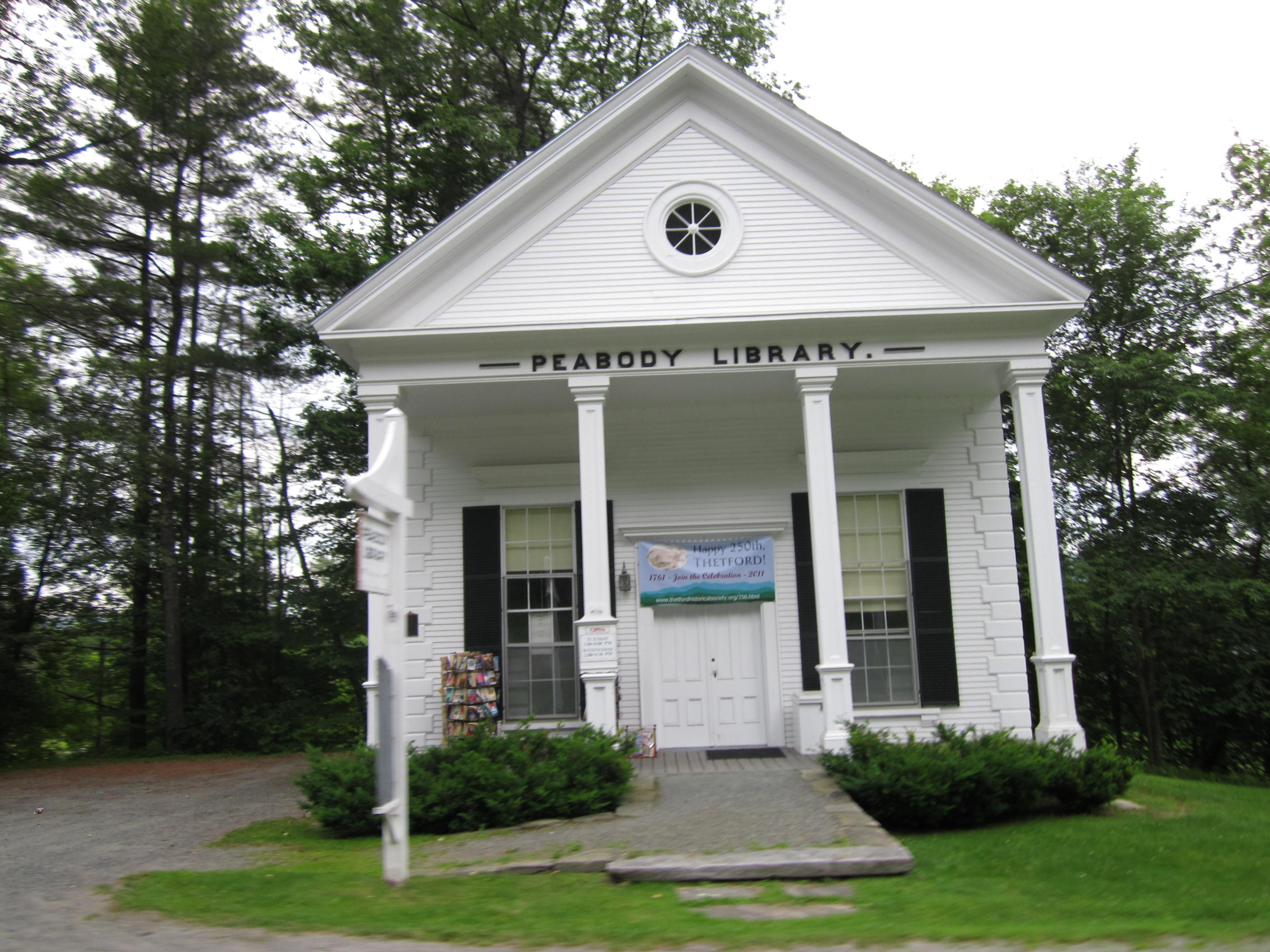

- Location within Vermont Location within the United States
- Location: 7922 VT Route 113, Thetford, Vermont
- Coordinates: 43°53′7″N 72°15′40″W
- Area: 0.3 acres (0.12 ha)
- Built: 1867
- Architectural style: Greek Revival, Italianate
- NRHP reference No.: 84003466
- Added to NRHP: September 27, 1984

The Peabody Library is one of two public libraries buildings in Thetford, Vermont, USA. Serving the village of Post Mills, it was built in 1867, and is the oldest active library in the state federation of public libraries. It was listed on the National Register of Historic Places in 1984.

== Architecture and history ==
The Peabody Library stands near the western end of the dispersed rural village of Post Mills in northern Thetford, just south of the junction of Vermont Routes 113 and 244. It is a modest single-story wood-frame building, with a gabled roof and clapboarded exterior. It is well decorated with Greek Revival and early Italianate features, including quoined corners, tall windows topped by corniced lintels and a recessed front porch supported by paneled pilasters. Above the porch is a fully pedimented gable with oculus window at the center. The interior has a single large chamber, which includes a narrow mezzanine level accessed by winding stairs near the front corners.

The library was a gift to the community of Post Mills by George Peabody, one of the first great American philanthropists. Peabody spent some time in Post Mills as a teenager, where his maternal grandfather lived. Peabody's grant of $5,000 paid for purchase of the land, construction of the building and acquisition of 1,100 volumes. The Thetford library system also includes the more modern Latham Library, located in Thetford Hill.

== See also ==
- National Register of Historic Places listings in Orange County, Vermont
