= Kingsbury Covered Bridge =

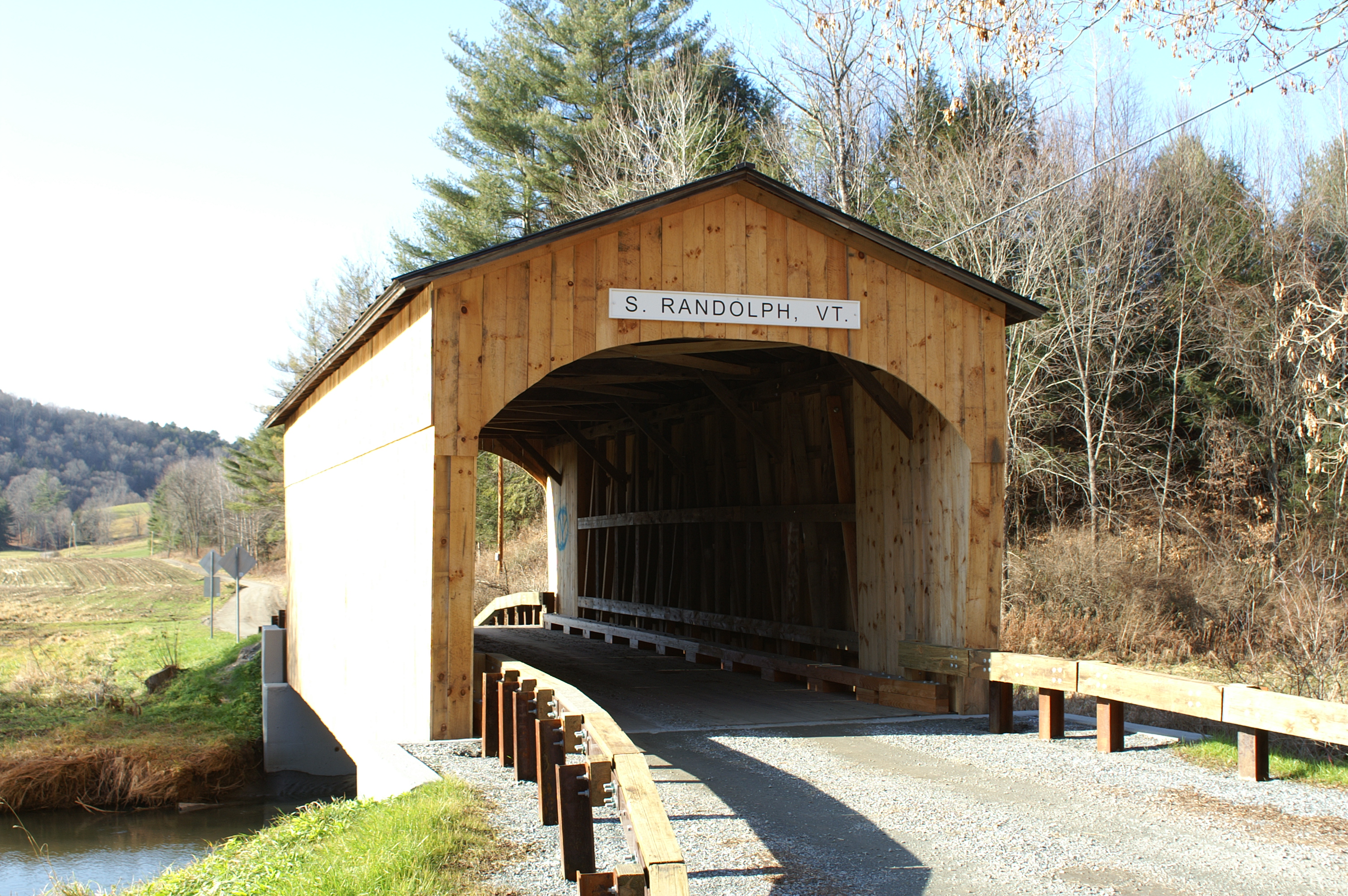
- Coordinates: 43°52′52″N 72°34′55″W
- Carries: Automobile
- Crosses: Second Branch of White River
- Locale: Randolph, Vermont
- Maintained by: Town of Randolph
- ID number: VT-09-02

Characteristics
- Design: Covered, King post
- Material: Wood
- Total length: 51.75 ft (15.77 m)
- Width: 15.75 ft (4.80 m)
- No. of spans: 1

History
- Constructed by: unknown
- Construction end: 1904
- Kingsbury Covered Bridge
- U.S. National Register of Historic Places
- Location within Vermont Location within the United States
- Coordinates: 43°52′52″N 72°34′56″W
- Area: 1 acre (0.4 ha)
- Built: 1904
- NRHP reference No.: 74000242
- Added to NRHP: July 30, 1974

The Kingsbury Covered Bridge, also called the Hyde Covered Bridge, is a wooden covered bridge that carries Kingsbury Road across the Second Branch of the White River in Randolph, Vermont. Built in 1904, it is last documented covered bridge to be built in Vermont during the historic 19th and early 20th century period. It was listed on the National Register of Historic Places in 1974.

== Description and history ==
The Kingsbury Covered Bridge is located in southernmost Randolph, just west of Vermont Route 14 on Kingsbury Road, a lightly traveled local road. It is a single-span multiple kingpost truss bridge, with trusses 51 feet (16 m) long resting on stone abutments. The bridge is 18 feet (5.5 m) wide, with a roadway width of 15.5 feet (4.7 m) (one lane). Its exterior is sheathed in vertical board siding, and it is covered by a metal roof. There are no windows in the side walls, and the portal ends and interiors are also covered in vertical boards.

The bridge was built in 1904 by an unknown builder. It is the youngest of the state's historic covered bridges; after this bridge was built, no new covered bridges were built in the state until the 1960s. It was restored in 1980, but closed shortly thereafter due to ice damage. It was repaired again in 1994. The repairs were short-lived as another restoration was completed in 2009.

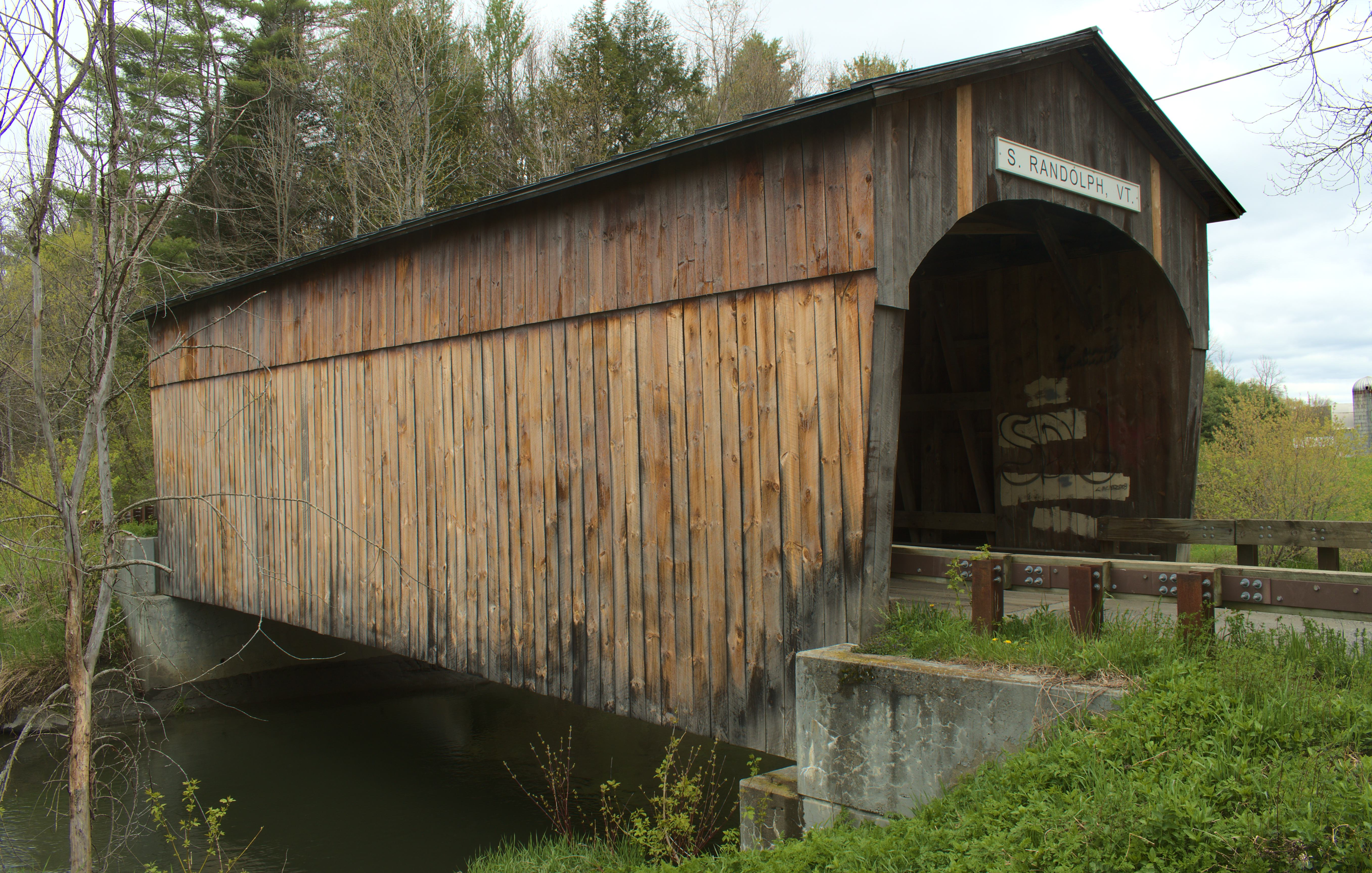

== See also ==
- National Register of Historic Places listings in Orange County, Vermont
- List of Vermont covered bridges
- List of bridges on the National Register of Historic Places in Vermont
