= Newbury (village), Vermont =

Newbury, Vermont
- Village
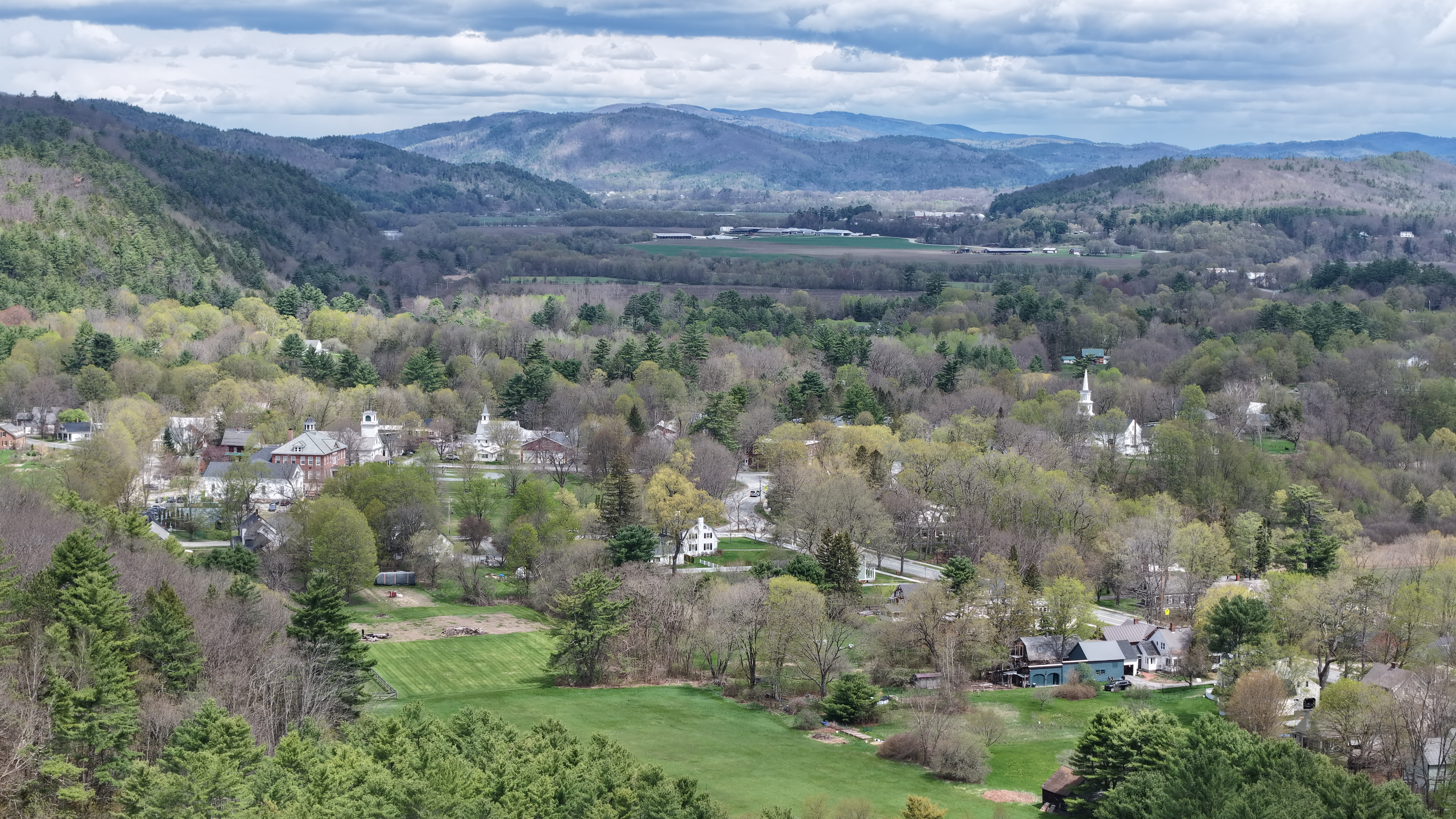
- Newbury, Vermont, from the south

- Location within the state of Vermont Newbury (the United States)
- Coordinates: 44°04′51″N 72°03′36″W
- Country: United States
- State: Vermont
- County: Orange
- Town: Newbury

Area
  - Total: 5.08 sq mi (13.16 km^{2})
  - Land: 4.97 sq mi (12.86 km^{2})
  - Water: 0.12 sq mi (0.31 km^{2})
- Elevation: 476 ft (145 m)

Population (2020)
  - Total: 447
  - Density: 90.0/sq mi (34.8/km^{2})
- Time zone: UTC-5 (Eastern (EST))
  - Summer (DST): UTC-4 (EDT)
- ZIP code: 05051
- Area code: 802
- FIPS code: 50-48100
- GNIS feature ID: 2378317

Newbury is an incorporated village in the town of Newbury in Orange County, Vermont, United States. The population was 447 at the 2020 census.

== History ==
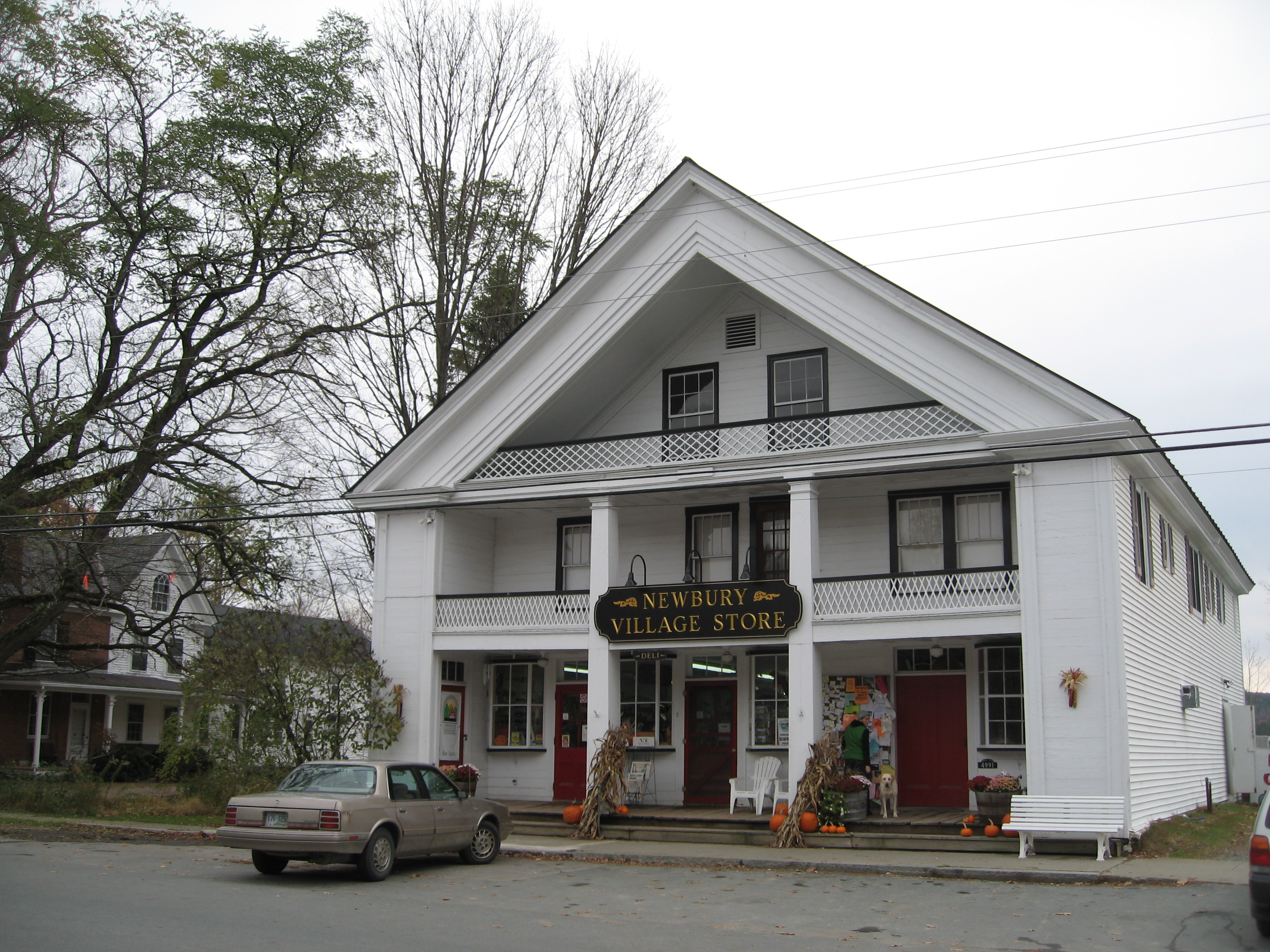
Newbury Village Store

Newbury village was settled in 1763, and was along with neighboring Haverhill, New Hampshire, the first colonial settlement north of Charlestown, New Hampshire on the Connecticut River. The area developed because of the rich agricultural possibilities afforded by broad oxbows in the river. The village developed in the 19th century as a local market center and as a stagecoach stop. Its population was boosted by the found of the Newbury Seminary in the 1830s.

The core of the village is listed as a historic district known as Newbury Village Historic District on the National Register of Historic Places. It was listed for its architectural significance in 1983. The historic village core around the village green includes 93 contributing buildings in an area of 73 acres (30 ha). Newbury Village is significant as a concentration of early 19th century architecture set around a traditional New England village green. Classical Revival architecture is represented in the district. Boston University, one of New England's largest universities, traces its roots to the establishment of the Newbury Biblical Institute, a Methodist school founded in Newbury, Vermont in 1839.

=== Historical buildings ===
Some of the more significant structures in Newbury are:

- Wells House, c.1830
- Newbury Manor, 1913
- Town Clerk's Office and Post Office, 1913
- Tenney Memorial Library, 1896
- 'Valmont," Crowley House, c.1835
- Congregational Vestry, 1843
- First Congregational Church, 1856
- Newbury General Store, c.1840
- Methodist Church, 1829
- Town Central School, 1913
- Village Meeting Hall, c.1926
- Newbury Inn/Thomas House, 1853 (built by Oliver Rogers)
- Mahoney House, c.1822
- Perry House, c.1835
- General Jacob Bayley Monument

== Geography ==
According to the United States Census Bureau, the village has a total area of 5.0 square miles (13.1 km^{2}), of which 5.0 square miles (13.0 km^{2}) is land and 0.04 square mile (0.1 km^{2}) (0.40%) is water.

== Demographics ==
Historical population
| Census | Pop. | Note | %± |
|---|---|---|---|
| 1910 | 412 | | — |
| 1970 | 344 | | — |
| 1980 | 425 | | 23.5% |
| 1990 | 412 | | −3.1% |
| 2000 | 396 | | −3.9% |
| 2010 | 365 | | −7.8% |
| 2020 | 447 | | 22.5% |
U.S. Decennial Census

As of the census of 2000, there were 396 people, 162 households, and 98 families residing in the village. The population density was 78.9 people per square mile (30.5/km^{2}). There were 188 housing units at an average density of 37.5/sq mi (14.5/km^{2}). The racial makeup of the village was 99.24% White, 0.51% Native American, and 0.25% from two or more races. Hispanic or Latino of any race were 0.51% of the population.

There were 162 households, out of which 36.4% had children under the age of 18 living with them, 50.0% were married couples living together, 6.2% had a female householder with no husband present, and 39.5% were non-families. 30.9% of all households were made up of individuals, and 15.4% had someone living alone who was 65 years of age or older. The average household size was 2.44 and the average family size was 3.09.

In the village, the population was spread out, with 29.5% under the age of 18, 3.8% from 18 to 24, 25.0% from 25 to 44, 25.8% from 45 to 64, and 15.9% who were 65 years of age or older. The median age was 41 years. For every 100 females, there were 102.0 males. For every 100 females age 18 and over, there were 82.4 males.

The median income for a household in the village was $27,115, and the median income for a family was $41,071. Males had a median income of $27,500 versus $23,000 for females. The per capita income for the village was $16,043. About 8.2% of families and 14.4% of the population were below the poverty line, including 12.0% of those under age 18 and 9.8% of those age 65 or over.

== See also ==
- National Register of Historic Places listings in Orange County, Vermont
