= Fairlee, Vermont =

- Town
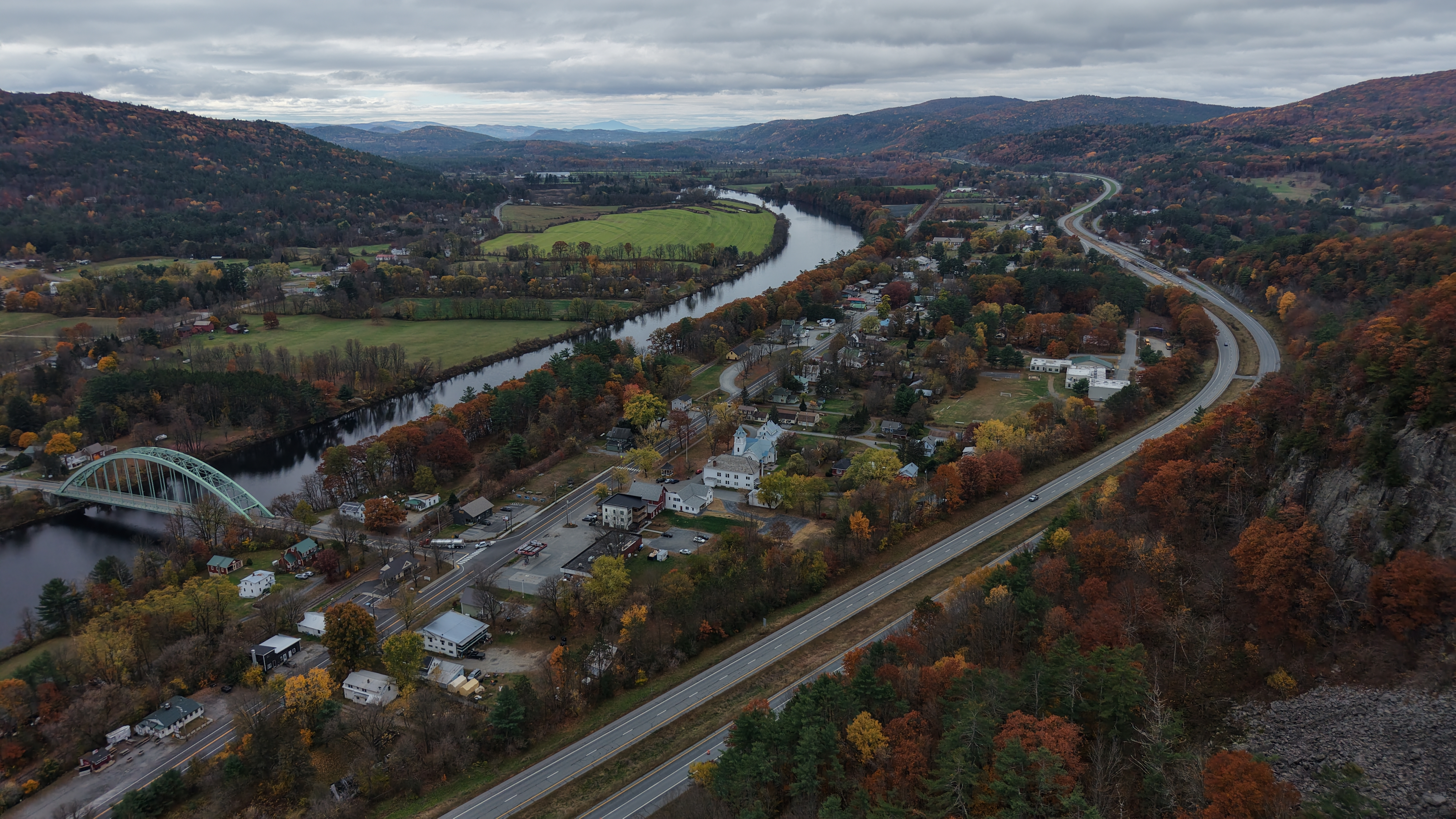
- Fairlee, VT, from the northeast

- Seal

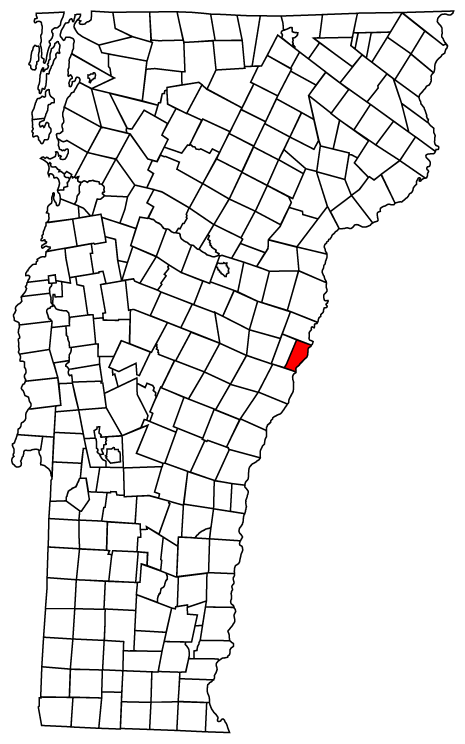
- Located in Orange County, Vermont
- Coordinates: 43°55′15″N 72°08′36″W
- Country: United States
- State: Vermont
- County: Orange
- Chartered: 1761

Area
  - Total: 21.2 sq mi (55.0 km^{2})
  - Land: 20.2 sq mi (52.3 km^{2})
  - Water: 1.0 sq mi (2.7 km^{2})
- Elevation: 968 ft (295 m)

Population (2020)
  - Total: 988
  - Density: 49/sq mi (18.9/km^{2})
  - Households: 471
  - Families: 250
- Time zone: UTC-5 (EST)
  - Summer (DST): UTC-4 (EDT)
- ZIP Codes: 05045 (Fairlee); 05033 (Bradford)
- Area code: 802
- FIPS code: 50-25675
- GNIS feature ID: 1462095
- Website: fairleevt.gov

Fairlee is a town in Orange County, Vermont, United States. The population was 988 at the 2020 census. It includes the village of Ely. Fairlee is home to Lake Morey, which claims to have the longest ice skating trail in the United States.

== History ==
One of the New Hampshire grants, Fairlee was chartered by Governor Benning Wentworth on September 9, 1761, and awarded to Josiah Channey, Joseph Hubbard and 62 others. It was first settled in 1766. On February 25, 1797, the western half of the grant was set off as West Fairlee.

The population was 575 by 1859, when it had several sawmills, a gristmill, and an establishment for lead pipe and pumps.

The Fairlee Railroad Depot was built in 1848 by the Connecticut & Passumpsic Rivers Railroad. Listed on the National Register of Historic Places in 1998, it is the oldest surviving railroad structure along the Connecticut River.

== Geography ==
According to the United States Census Bureau, the town has a total area of 21.2 square miles (55 km^{2}), of which, 20.2 sq mi (52 km^{2}) is land and 1 sq mi (2.6 km^{2}) (4.90%) is water. Bounded by the Connecticut River, Fairlee is drained by Glen Falls Brook, Big Brook and the outlet of Lake Morey. The village of Fairlee is on the eastern edge of the town, along U.S. Route 5.

== Demographics ==
Historical population
Census	Pop.	Note	%±
1790	463		—
1800	386		−16.6%
1810	983		154.7%
1820	1,143		16.3%
1830	656		−42.6%
1840	644		−1.8%
1850	575		−10.7%
1860	549		−4.5%
1870	416		−24.2%
1880	469		12.7%
1890	398		−15.1%
1900	438		10.1%
1910	438		0.0%
1920	459		4.8%
1930	456		−0.7%
1940	535		17.3%
1950	571		6.7%
1960	569		−0.4%
1970	604		6.2%
1980	770		27.5%
1990	883		14.7%
2000	967		9.5%
2010	977		1.0%
2020	988		1.1%
U.S. Decennial Census

As of the census of 2000, there were 967 people, 395 households, and 265 families living in the town. The population density was 47.9 people per square mile (18.5/km^{2}). There were 575 housing units at an average density of 28.5 per square mile (11.0/km^{2}). The racial makeup of the town was 97.52% White, 0.21% African American, 0.10% Native American, 0.52% Asian, 0.21% from other races, and 1.45% from two or more races. Hispanic or Latino people of any race were 0.83% of the population.

There were 395 households, out of which 31.4% had children under the age of 18 living with them, 54.2% were married couples living together, 7.8% had a female householder with no husband present, and 32.7% were non-families. 25.1% of all households were made up of individuals, and 10.1% had someone living alone who was 65 years of age or older. The average household size was 2.42 and the average family size was 2.88.

In the town, the population was spread out, with 23.6% under the age of 18, 7.2% from 18 to 24, 28.3% from 25 to 44, 25.4% from 45 to 64, and 15.4% who were 65 years of age or older. The median age was 41 years. For every 100 females, there were 96.9 males. For every 100 females age 18 and over, there were 96.5 males.

The median income for a household in the town was $44,018, and the median income for a family was $48,250. Males had a median income of $31,736 versus $25,217 for females. The per capita income for the town was $18,454. About 2.6% of families and 5.6% of the population were below the poverty line, including 4.7% of those under age 18 and 13.4% of those age 65 or over.

== Infrastructure ==
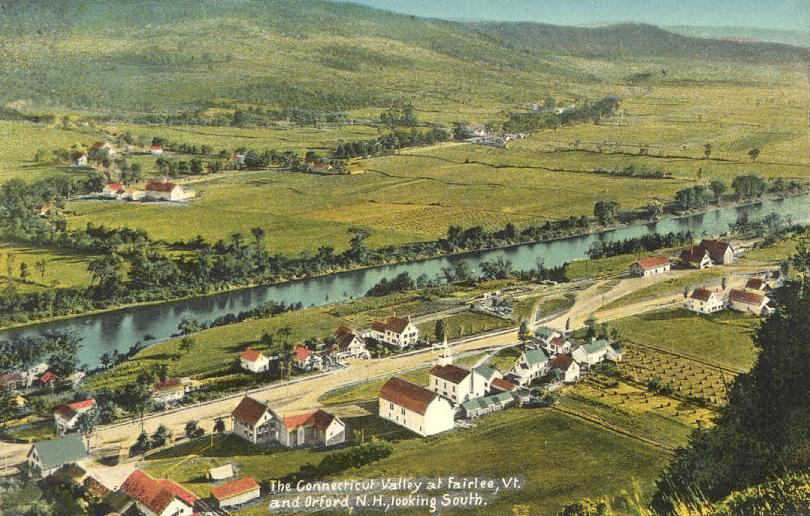
Fairlee from Morey Mountain c. 1907

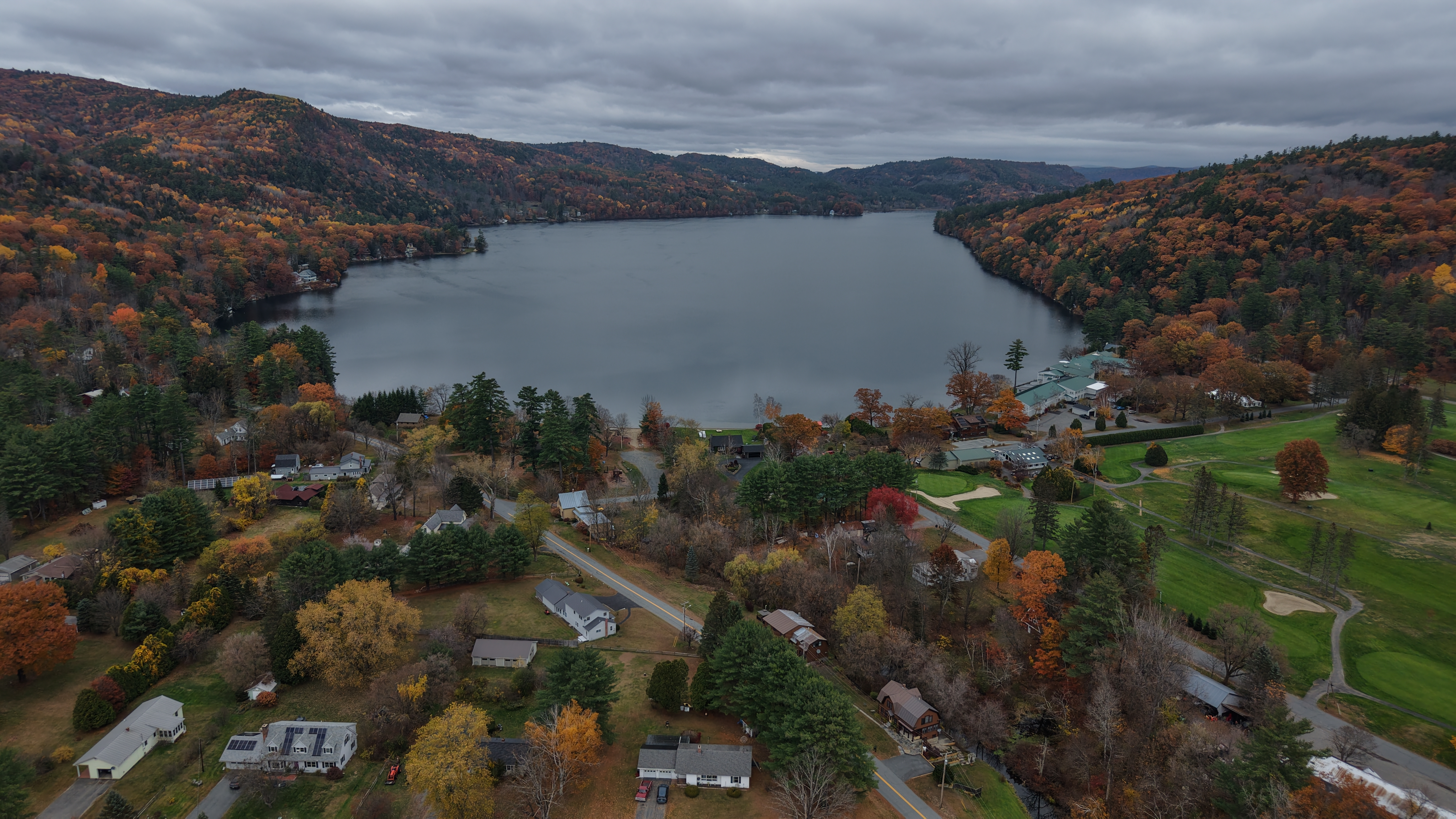
Lake Morey, VT, from the southwest

=== Transportation ===
The town is crossed by Interstate 91, U.S. Route 5, and Vermont Route 244.

== Education ==
Residents are in the Rivendell Interstate School District. Samuel Morey Elementary School is in Fairlee. In 2023 the school district's board of trustees voted to close it; six members voted in favor, two were against, and two were not present.

== Notable people ==
- Helen Gahagan Douglas, actress and US congresswoman
- Milton Friedman, economist, former summer resident of West Fairlee
- William H. Gilmore, Adjutant General of the Vermont National Guard
- Richard W. Mallary, US congressman
- Samuel Morey, inventor
- George W. Morrison, US congressman
- Nathaniel Niles, politician
- Stephen Thomas, politician and brigadier general
