= Vermont Route 25 =

State highway in Orange County Vermont, US

Vermont Route 25
- VT 25 highlighted in red, VT 25A in magenta, VT 25B in blue

Route information
- Maintained by VTrans
- Length: 17.739 mi (28.548 km)
- Existed: 1926–present

Major junctions
- South end: NH 25 at Piermont, NH
- I-91 in Bradford
- North end: US 302 in Orange

Location
- Country: United States
- State: Vermont
- Counties: Orange

Highway system
- State highways in Vermont
← VT 23	→ VT 25A
← Route 25	N.E.	→ Route 26
← VT 25A	VT 25B	→ VT 26

Vermont Route 25 (VT 25) is a 17.739-mile-long (28.548 km) north–south state highway in Orange County, Vermont, United States. It begins at the New Hampshire state line in Bradford, continuing across the Connecticut River as New Hampshire Route 25, and ends in Orange at U.S. Route 302 (US 302).

== Route description ==
VT 25 begins at the New Hampshire state line just south of the village of Bradford. The road continues across the state line at the Connecticut River as New Hampshire Route 25. Approximately 0.5 miles (0.8 km) west of the state line, VT 25 intersects with U.S. Route 5, which leads to the town center. Soon after, VT 25 has an interchange with Interstate 91 at Exit 16, then an intersection with VT 25B, a spur route leading from southbound VT 25 towards Bradford village. VT 25 continues in a northwest direction, following the path of the Waits River. It travels through mainly rural areas, passing through the small settlements of Bradford Center and East Corinth. VT 25 crosses the Waits River near the Corinth-Topsham town line, where it continues following the river through the communities of Waits River and West Topsham. VT 25 continues approximately 0.3 miles (0.48 km) after crossing into the town of Orange, where it ends at an intersection with U.S. Route 302.

== History ==

Vermont Route 25 was formerly known as New England Route 25A, an alternate route of New England Route 25 from Topsham through Bradford. It connected back to the main New Hampshire section of Route 25 via an overlap with New Hampshire Route 10. Within Vermont, the main route of New England Route 25 was assigned in 1926 to U.S. Route 2. At the same time, Vermont renumbered 25A to 25. In 1935, US 2 in Vermont was relocated to a more northerly alignment and the former New England Route 25 was redesignated as U.S. Route 302.

== Major intersections ==
The entire route is in Orange County.

Location	mi	km	Destinations	Notes
Bradford	0.000	0.000	NH 25 east – Piermont	Continuation into New Hampshire
Bradford	0.496	0.798	US 5 (Lower Plain) – Fairlee, Bradford	
Bradford	0.984– 1.176	1.584– 1.893	I-91 – Fairlee, White River Junction, Wells River, St. Johnsbury	Exit 16 (I-91); diamond interchange
Bradford	1.694	2.726	VT 25B east (South Main Street) – Bradford	Western terminus of VT 25B
Orange	17.739	28.548	US 302 (William Scott Memorial Highway) – Orange, Barre, Groton, Wells River	Northern terminus
1.000 mi = 1.609 km; 1.000 km = 0.621 mi

== Suffixed routes ==
=== Vermont Route 25A ===
Vermont Route 25A
- Location: Fairlee
- Length: 0.088 mi (142 m)

Vermont Route 25A (VT 25A) in Fairlee is the 0.088-mile (0.142 km) westward extension of New Hampshire Route 25A. It does not intersect VT 25; it is only related to VT 25 because of NH 25.

=== Vermont Route 25B ===
Vermont Route 25B
- Location: Bradford
- Length: 0.981 mi (1,579 m)

Vermont Route 25B (VT 25B) is a 0.981-mile (1.579 km) spur of southbound VT 25 towards the village of Bradford, which VT 25 bypasses. VT 25B ends at U.S. Route 5.
