= Waits River Schoolhouse =

- U.S. National Register of Historic Places
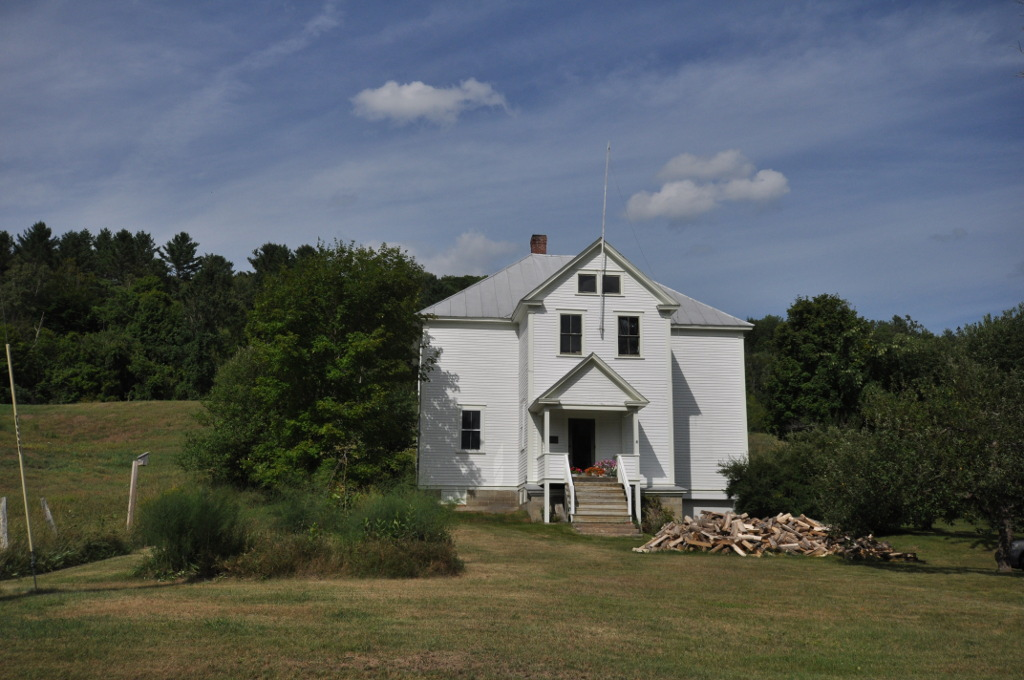

- Location within Vermont Location within the United States
- Location: VT 25 on the north side of Waits River, Vermont
- Coordinates: 44°5′29″N 72°17′9″W
- Area: 0.5 acres (0.20 ha)
- Built: 1914
- Built by: Zwicker, J.W.
- Architectural style: Colonial Revival
- NRHP reference No.: 88002656
- Added to NRHP: September 27, 1988

The Waits River School is a historic school building on Vermont Route 25 in the Waits River village of Topsham, Vermont, United States. Now a private residence, it was built in 1914 as a combination district school and Grange hall, serving in those roles until 1972 and 1953, respectively. It was listed on the National Register of Historic Places in 1988 for its Colonial Revival architecture and its importance in local educational history.

== Description and history ==
The former Waits River School building is located in the rural village of Waits River (a short way west of the West Topsham United Methodist Church on the north side of Vermont Route 25). It is a two-story wood-frame structure with a hip roof and a clapboarded exterior. A 2 1/2-story gabled section projects from the center of the front facade, with the main entrance at its base. The entry is slightly off-center and is sheltered by a gabled porch supported by square posts. The exterior is relatively unadorned, its massing, slender corner moulding, and partial gable returns the only major indicators of its Colonial Revival style. The interior is more elaborate and is reflective of an evolutionary history dictated by changing state requirements for school building standards.

The school was built in 1914 by J.W. Zwicker, replacing a district school that had burnt down the previous year. Despite attempts by the town to build it to then-current state standards, it did not meet them and required some alterations before achieving state certification in 1937. The principal alterations were the addition of banks of windows to improve classroom and lighting and the improvement of heating, ventilation, and bathroom facilities. The building also housed the local Grange chapter on the second floor until 1953, when that space was adapted for use as a second classroom. The school was closed in 1972 and sold to a private owner.

== See also ==
- National Register of Historic Places listings in Orange County, Vermont
