= William Nutt =

Colonel in the American Civil War

- Born: August 5, 1836; Topsham, Vermont, U.S.
- Died: August 30, 1909 (aged 73)
- Title: State Representative
- Spouse: Abigail Prentice Puffer
- Parent(s): Isaac Brewster Nutt; Sally Ann Munroe

William Nutt (August 5, 1836 – August 30, 1909) was a colonel in the American Civil War, a representative to the Massachusetts General Court from 1871 to 1872 and again in 1901, he was also the chairman of the board of the Natick Five Cents Savings Bank.

== Biography ==
He was born on August 5, 1836, in Topsham, Vermont, to Isaac Brewster Nutt and Sally Ann Munroe. His paternal grandparents were William Nutt and Mary Brewster. His grandfather's grandfather William Nutt was one of the first settlers of Londonderry, New Hampshire. Both his grandfather and his great grandfather Samuel served in the revolution and his father in the War of 1812. His early education was limited to a few terms in the district school of his native town. As soon as he was old enough he began to work on the farm of his father and for neighboring farmers.

In his sixteenth year, in 1852, he moved to Natick, Massachusetts, where he began to work at the shoemaker's trade. He supplemented his schooling by much reading and study, and attended private schools when he had the opportunity. As a shoemaker, associated with Henry Wilson, who afterwards became vice-president of the United States, he became interested in the slavery question, and in 1857, took part in the Kansas movement, the result of which was to keep that state free from slavery. He 'squatted' at Lawrence, Kansas.

His first vote was for the Free Soil ticket, and he was one of the active organizers of the Republican Party. He returned from Kansas to his home in Natick, Massachusetts, and followed his trade as a shoemaker until the Civil War broke out. He was a member of the militia company at Natick, but left the organization to enlist in Co. I. Capt. A. B. Underwood, 2nd regiment of the Massachusetts Volunteer Militia on May 15, 1861. He was made a corporal, and on August 11, 1861, he was promoted to sergeant. He was a very successful drill master, and was detailed early in the service to instruct officers as well as men of the 27th Indiana Regiment.

=== Civil War ===
His first skirmish was October 22, 1861, at Conrad's Ferry, Virginia. After the Battle of Ball's Bluff, in which he was engaged, he was in the hospital sick for several weeks, and was, when convalescent, detailed, December 1861 to recruiting service in Springfield, Massachusetts. He returned to his regiment in Martinsburg, Virginia, after being assigned to the 12th Massachusetts Regiment, from April to June 1862. The regiment lost nearly half its men and more than half its officers in an engagement August 9, 1862, and from that time until he left the regiment in March 1863, he was acting first sergeant with the special duty of drilling recruits.

At the Battle of Antietam a third of the regiment was killed or wounded. He was commissioned March 5, 1863, second lieutenant, and May, 1863, first lieutenant, in the 54th Massachusetts Regiment under Colonel Robert Gould Shaw. He was afterwards made a captain in the 55th Massachusetts Regiment.

He was the provost marshal of Jacksonville, Florida, in February, 1864; promoted major, November, 1864; Provost Marshal of Charleston, South Carolina, in February, 1865; promoted lieutenant colonel June 1865, and Brevet Colonel at the close of the war. He was mustered out in September, 1865.

=== Natick ===
He became a partner in the firm of David & Plummer, shoe manufacturers of Natick, but finding that business uncongenial, began to study law in December, 1866, in the office of Walter N. Mason, Natick. In February 1868 he was appointed agent of the Freedmen's Bureau, and located at Halifax and Lunenburg Counties, Virginia. After six months of this service, and study of law, her returned to Natick and was admitted to the bar in Middlesex County, Massachusetts, August 9, 1868. He opened an office in Natick, where Colonel Nutt was as prominent in political and public life as in military affairs.

He was always active in the Republican party, serving for many years on the town committee, often as chairman; frequently being delegate to the state and other conventions of his party. He was first elected moderator of the Natick town meeting, after a sharp contest in 1870. He was particularly well fitted for this duty by parliamentary knowledge, experience in presiding, and knowledge of town business, and often served the town, the last occasion being 1896.

He was the tax collector in 1870 and 1871; representative to the General Court of Massachusetts in 1871-1872, serving on the committee on labor in 1871 and on probate and insolvency and woman suffrage in 1872; chairman of the Natick board of selectmen 1874, 1876, and 1881; member of the board of health 1874; overseer of the poor for three years; member of the school committee 1873; on many important town committees; deputy sheriff 1877-1886 inclusive; trial justice of the Natick Court 1886 to 1892. He was elected state senator in 1901 by a vote of 7328 to 4204 for his opponent, in a district that had the previous year elected a democrat. He served on the committees on constitutional amendments, military affairs, and chairman of the committee on taxation. He was also on the important special committee which revised the public statutes. He was justice of the peace from 1867 and notary public from 1874.

=== Death ===
Colonel Nutt made a specialty of probate court practice, and has had the settlement of many important estates and trusts. He did most of the pension business for his locality. In his later years most of his practice was as attorney for the Natick Five Cents Savings Bank a very prosperous institution. He was a member of the investing board from 1869 until 1909, and chairman of the board and first vice-president of the bank until his resignation, on account of ill-health, May 1, 1909, a period, of forty years. Nutt had been suffering from hardening of the arteries for a long time, his fatal illness having really begun many months ago, and when he retired from practice last December it was hoped that he might enjoy at least a few years of rest in his old age, but fate willed otherwise. His condition grew steadily worse and Saturday he became unconscious. The members of the family were summoned and were all at the homestead waiting for the end which came Monday without his having regained consciousness.

== Legacy ==
He married at Framingham, Massachusetts, April 25, 1863, Abigail Prentice Puffer, who died January 27, 1906. He leaves four sons; William Harrison of Everett, Massachusetts; Charles of Worcester, Massachusetts; George of Natick, Massachusetts, and Henry of Winthrop, Massachusetts; three daughters, Nellie A. of Elwyn, Pennsylvania; Mrs Ralph D. Sutherland and Matilda of Natick, Massachusetts; two brothers, Isaac Brewster of Natick, Massachusetts, and Samuel of South Haven, Kansas, and one sister, Mrs. Nathan P. Rice, West Boylston, Massachusetts.

== See also ==
- 1872 Massachusetts legislature
