= Bradford Village Historic District =

Bradford Village Historic District may refer to:

- Bradford Village Historic District (Hopkinton and Westerly, Rhode Island)
- Bradford Village Historic District (Bradford, Vermont)
