= Edna Beard =

American politician

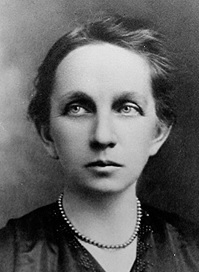
- From the November 9, 1922 edition of The Bethel Courier newspaper (Bethel, VT)

Member of the Vermont Senate from Orange County
- In office 1923–1925
- Preceded by: John C. Sherburne
- Succeeded by: Frederick H. Bickford

Chairwoman of the Vermont Senate Committee on the Library
- In office 1923–1925
- Preceded by: Harlow A. Bottum
- Succeeded by: Daniel Johnson

Member of the Vermont House of Representatives from the Town of Orange
- In office 1921–1923
- Preceded by: Sherman Chamberlain
- Succeeded by: Charles Colby

Town Treasurer of Orange, Vermont
- In office 1912–1928
- Preceded by: Royal Edson Beard
- Succeeded by: Earl D. Emerson

Personal details
- Born: July 25, 1877 Chenoa, Illinois, U.S.
- Died: September 18, 1928 (aged 51) Orange, Vermont, U.S.
- Resting place: Orange Center Cemetery; Orange, Vermont, U.S.
- Party: Republican
- Other political affiliations: Citizen's Party (September–November 1920)
- Parent(s): Royal Edson Beard (1845-1912); Flora (Curtiss) Beard (1849-1920)
- Education: Spaulding High School, Barre, Vermont
- Occupation: Farmer; School teacher and administrator Town treasurer

Edna Louisa Beard (July 25, 1877 – September 18, 1928) was the first woman legislator in Vermont; she was the first woman elected to the Vermont House of Representatives, and the first woman elected to the Vermont Senate.

A native of Illinois, her parents were from Orange, Vermont, and returned there in the early 1880s. Beard was raised and educated in Orange, graduated from Spaulding High School in Barre, and became a school teacher and administrator. She also served in local offices including town treasurer, and operated a dairy farm in partnership with one of her brothers.

In 1920, the Constitution's Nineteenth Amendment made it possible for women to vote in statewide and national elections. Beard ran for the Republican nomination to represent Orange in the Vermont House of Representatives. She lost, and subsequently filed to run as a third party candidate. 40 women in Orange registered to vote between the primary and general elections, and enough supported her to tip the scales for Beard, who won the seat and became Vermont's first woman state legislator. She served one term, 1921 to 1923, and in 1922 was a successful candidate for the State Senate, becoming the first woman to serve in that body. She left politics in 1924 because of ill health, but remained active on her farm and in her church.

Beard never married or had children. She died in Orange, and was buried at Orange Center Cemetery.

== Early life ==
Beard was born in Chenoa, Illinois on July 25, 1877, the daughter of Royal Edson Beard (1845–1912) and Flora (Curtiss) Beard. Her family was originally from Orange, Vermont, and they moved back to Orange in 1883. She was educated in Orange, and graduated from Barre's Spaulding High School in 1896.

Beard received her qualification as a teacher, and taught at several local area schools. She was both a teacher and superintendent of the Orange town schools beginning in 1906. She also served on the school board, was the town's assistant postmaster, and spent 16 years as town treasurer (1912–1928), after succeeding to the office following the death of her father, who was the incumbent. Beard never married or had children, and she resided on a dairy farm she operated in partnership with her brother Frank.

== Political career ==
=== Vermont House ===
In 1920, passage of the Nineteenth Amendment to the United States Constitution enabled women to vote in state and federal elections in Vermont. Beard ran for the Vermont House of Representatives, and lost the Republican primary, then tantamount to election in most Vermont towns, by six votes to Burt L. Richardson. Beard decided to run in the general election on the "Citizen's Party" line. Between the primary and general elections, 40 women in Orange registered to vote for the first time; in November, Beard defeated Richardson by 38 votes, and became the first woman elected to the Vermont House of Representatives.

She was given the first choice of seats in the House, and, as reported by the Rutland Herald, "She chose seat no. 146, and for a long time no man had the courage to select seat no. 145, which adjoined hers. The seat stood vacant for over an hour until Horatio Luce of Pomfret took the dare of his fellow members and sat down beside Miss Beard amid a storm of laughter and applause."

Her first bill in the Vermont House of Representatives, Act 218, was signed into law. It provided $2 a week child support for women whose husbands were "incapacitated by an incurable disease." Her maiden speech in the House was to second the renomination of Judge Stanley C. Wilson to the Vermont Superior Court, which contemporary news accounts indicated was received with "hearty applause."

=== Vermont Senate ===
In 1922 she was elected to Orange County's seat in the Vermont Senate, and was the first woman to serve in that body. She served one term, 1923 to 1925 and held a leadership role as chairwoman of the Senate Library Committee. Her first successful bill as Senator made it possible for county sheriffs to hire women as deputies.

== Later life ==
Beard was urged by supporters to enter the race for lieutenant governor in 1924, but left politics because she was in ill health. She was active in her local Congregational church, including teaching Sunday school, singing in the choir, and serving as its clerk, and remained involved with the church until her death.

== Death and burial ==
Beard died in Orange on September 18, 1928. She was buried in the Beard family plot at Orange Center Cemetery in Orange.

== Legacy ==
A portrait of Edna Beard by artist Ruth Mould is on display at the Vermont State House.
