= Waits River, Vermont =

Coordinates: 44.0896°N 72.2825°W

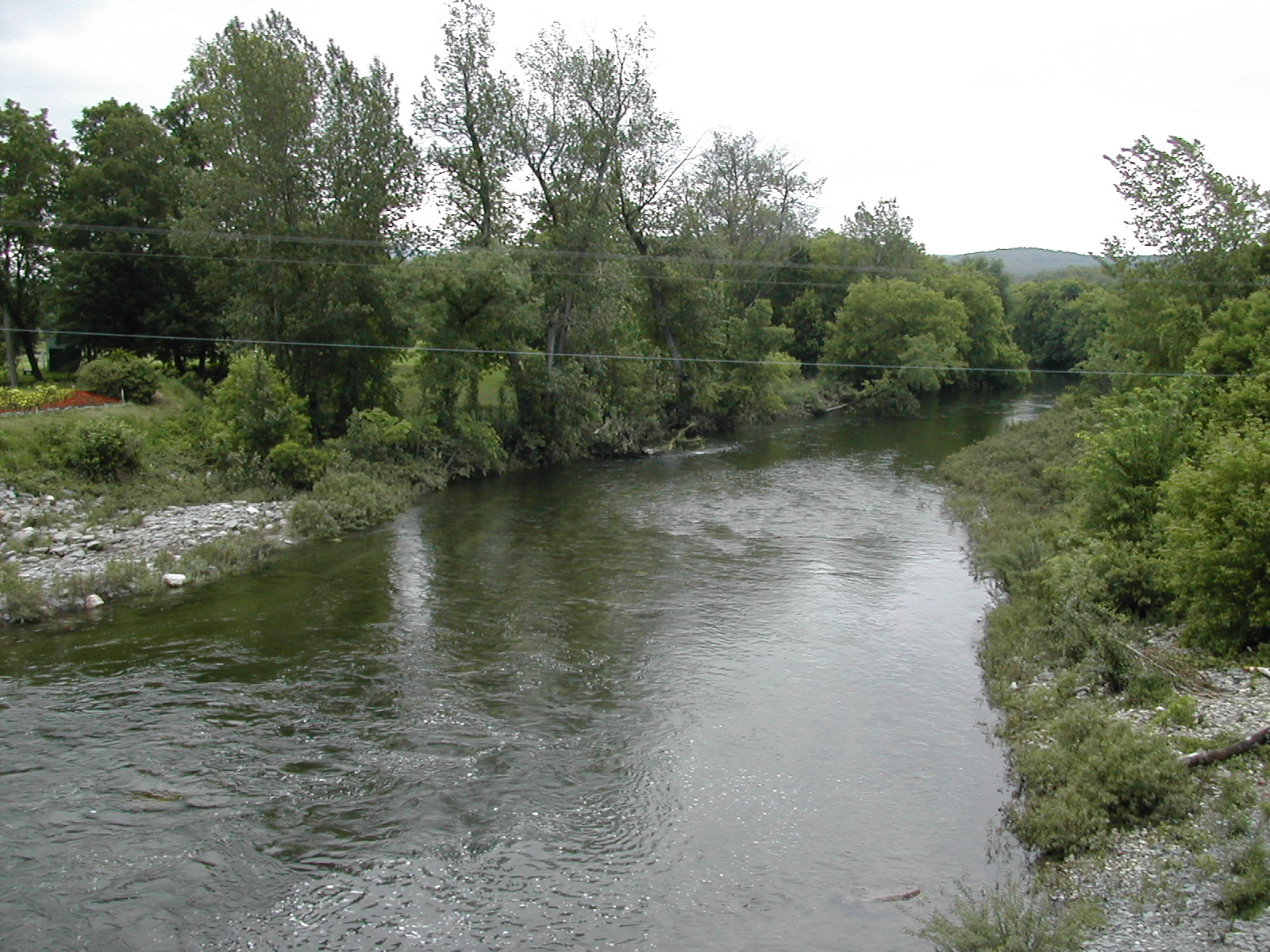
Waits River, from which the village takes its name, passes to the south

Waits River is a village in the town of Topsham, Vermont. Located alongside a river of the same name, the village of Waits River is made up of a number of residential homes, several barns and sheds, and a white Methodist church. Waits River Schoolhouse, an early 20th-century building which is now a private residence, was added to the National Register of Historic Places in 1988.

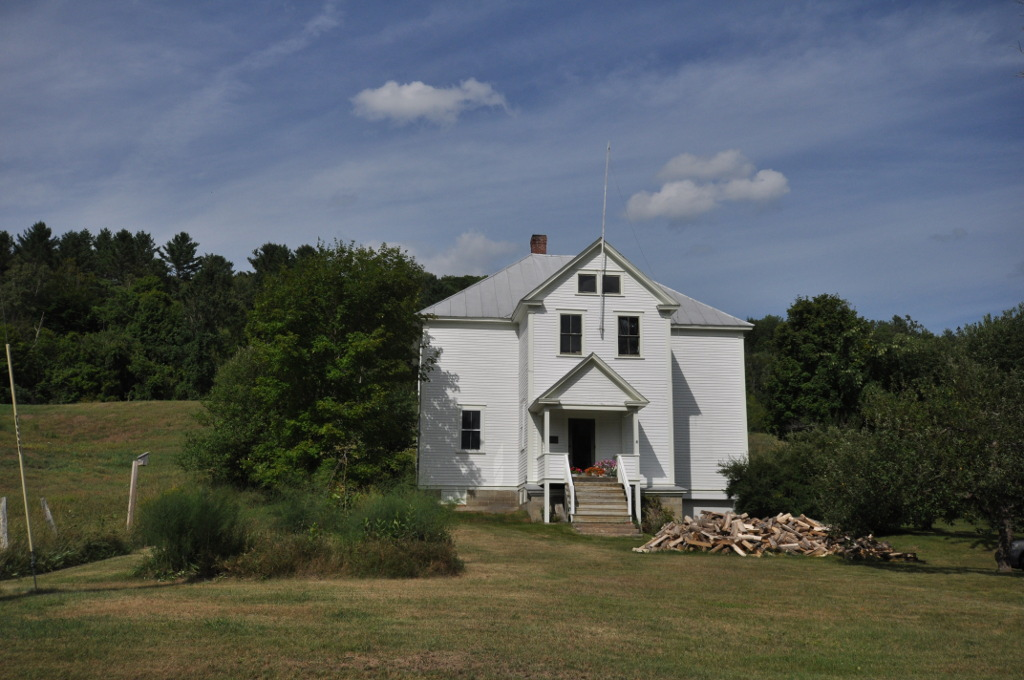
Waits River Schoolhouse

Photographs of the village during the foliage season have been popular since at least the 1960s, and scenic images of the village have appeared in jigsaw puzzles, calendars and postcards. Postcards of this type have been published since at least 1914.

A winter photograph of Waits River is featured on the cover of the 1959 album The Sounds of Christmas by Fred Waring and the Pennsylvanians.
