= Orange, Vermont =

- Town
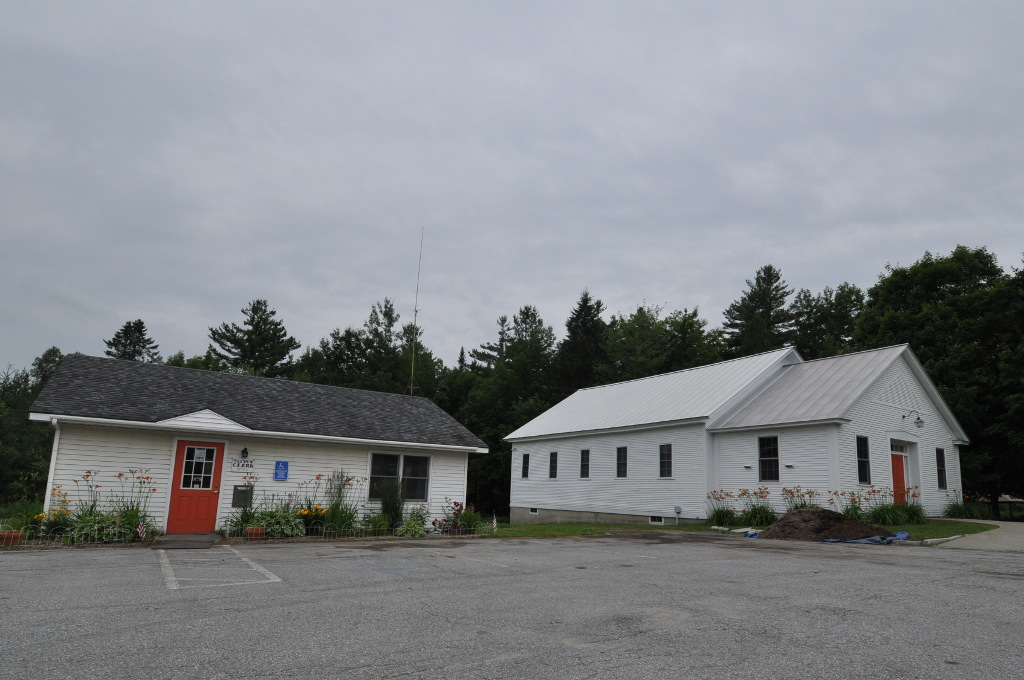
- Town offices of Orange

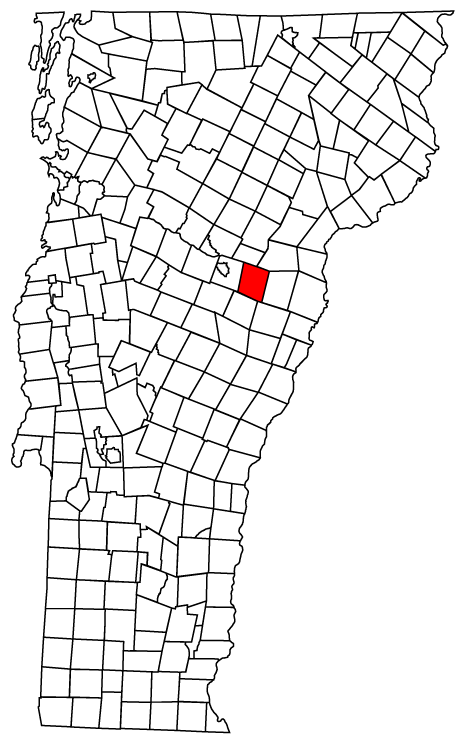
- Orange, Vermont
- Coordinates: 44°07′55″N 72°22′30″W
- Country: United States
- State: Vermont
- County: Orange
- Communities: Orange; East Orange

Area
  - Total: 39.0 sq mi (101.0 km^{2})
  - Land: 38.8 sq mi (100.4 km^{2})
  - Water: 0.23 sq mi (0.6 km^{2})
- Elevation: 1,765 ft (538 m)

Population (2020)
  - Total: 1,048
  - Density: 27/sq mi (10.4/km^{2})
- Time zone: UTC-5 (Eastern (EST))
  - Summer (DST): UTC-4 (EDT)
- ZIP Codes: 05641 (Orange); 05649 (East Barre); 05086 (West Topsham); 05675 (Washington)
- Area code: 802
- FIPS code: 50-53425
- GNIS feature ID: 1462167
- Website: orangevt.org

Orange is a town in Orange County, Vermont, United States. The population was 1,048 at the 2020 census.

== Geography ==
According to the United States Census Bureau, the town has a total area of 39.0 square miles (101.0 km^{2}), of which 38.8 square miles (100.4 km^{2}) is land and 0.2 square mile (0.6 km^{2}) (0.59%) is water. The Waits River flows through the northeastern part of Orange. Orange is also the site of the Dix Reservoir, the major water supply for adjoining Barre, along with its associated water processing facilities.

== Demographics ==
Historical population
Census	Pop.	Note	%±
1800	348		—
1810	686		97.1%
1820	751		9.5%
1830	1,016		35.3%
1840	984		−3.1%
1850	1,007		2.3%
1860	936		−7.1%
1870	733		−21.7%
1880	731		−0.3%
1890	589		−19.4%
1900	598		1.5%
1910	644		7.7%
1920	485		−24.7%
1930	508		4.7%
1940	482		−5.1%
1950	410		−14.9%
1960	430		4.9%
1970	540		25.6%
1980	752		39.3%
1990	915		21.7%
2000	965		5.5%
2010	1,072		11.1%
2020	1,048		−2.2%
U.S. Decennial Census

As of the census of 2000, there were 965 people, 362 households, and 278 families residing in the town. The population density was 24.9 people per square mile (9.6/km^{2}). There were 422 housing units at an average density of 10.9 per square mile (4.2/km^{2}). The racial makeup of the town was 98.55% White, 0.10% Native American, 0.21% Asian, 0.52% from other races, and 0.62% from two or more races. Hispanic or Latino of any race were 1.55% of the population.

There were 362 households, out of which 37.3% had children under the age of 18 living with them, 64.9% were couples living together and joined in either marriage or civil union, 6.6% had a female householder with no husband present, and 23.2% were non-families. 16.9% of all households were made up of individuals, and 4.4% had someone living alone who was 65 years of age or older. The average household size was 2.67 and the average family size was 3.03.

In the town, the population was spread out, with 27.0% under the age of 18, 6.1% from 18 to 24, 29.2% from 25 to 44, 27.0% from 45 to 64, and 10.6% who were 65 years of age or older. The median age was 38 years. For every 100 females, there were 97.3 males. For every 100 females age 18 and over, there were 97.8 males.

The median income for a household in the town was $40,300, and the median income for a family was $44,375. Males had a median income of $32,500 versus $22,614 for females. The per capita income for the town was $16,356. About 6.7% of families and 7.1% of the population were below the poverty line, including 3.5% of those under age 18 and 8.0% of those age 65 or over.

== History ==
In 1780, the American Revolution-era government of Vermont granted the town of Orange to Captain Ebenezer Green, Amos Robinson, and 63 other shareholders. At the time, New Hampshire, Vermont, and New York were fighting for control of Vermont, including the right to award town charters—a fight eventually won by Vermont. During the Revolution, New York unsuccessfully attempted to award a charter for the town of Kempton, which would have encompassed the same territory as Orange. The first settlement in Orange took place in 1793, when Joseph Williams and his family built a house in the southern portion of the town. Orange was officially organized in 1796 in a meeting which took place at Williams's home, and its first government consisted of: Joseph Thayer as town meeting moderator; John Sloane, town clerk; Thomas Storrs Paine, Fairbanks Bush, and Gould Camp as selectmen (Camp was also town treasurer); Ezra Paine, constable; listers Fairbanks Bush, Ezra Goodale, and Humphrey Hunt; and grand juror Joseph Williams. In 1798, Orange was represented in the Vermont House of Representatives for the first time, following the election of Ezra Goodale.

== Notable people ==
- Edna Beard, the first woman to serve in both the Vermont House of Representatives and the Vermont Senate
- Benjamin F. Fifield, lawyer who served as United States Attorney for the District of Vermont from 1869 to 1880
- Alexander Kennedy Miller, aviator and antique car collector
- Frank P. Sargent, Railroad union leader, U.S. Commissioner General of Immigration
- Stanley C. Wilson, Governor of Vermont (1931–1935)
