= Bradford, Vermont =

- Town
- Bradford, VT, viewed from the southwest

- Seal

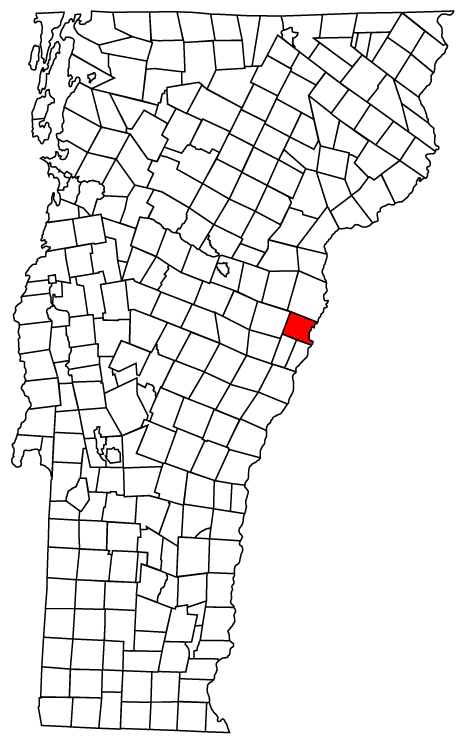
- Located in Orange County, Vermont
- Coordinates: 44°00′39″N 72°07′58″W
- Country: United States
- State: Vermont
- County: Orange
- Chartered: 1770
- Communities: Bradford; Bradford Center

Area
  - Total: 29.9 sq mi (77.4 km^{2})
  - Land: 29.8 sq mi (77.2 km^{2})
  - Water: 0.077 sq mi (0.2 km^{2})
- Elevation: 892 ft (272 m)

Population (2020)
  - Total: 2,790
  - Density: 93/sq mi (36.1/km^{2})
  - Households: 1,028
  - Families: 692
- Time zone: UTC-5 (EST)
  - Summer (DST): UTC-4 (EDT)
- ZIP Codes: 05033 (Bradford); 05040 (East Corinth)
- Area code: 802
- FIPS code: 50-07375
- GNIS feature ID: 1462046
- Website: bradford-vt.us

Bradford is a town in Orange County, Vermont, United States. The population was 2,790 at the 2020 census. Bradford is located on the county's eastern border, bordering both the Connecticut River and New Hampshire, and is a commercial center for some of its surrounding towns.

== History ==
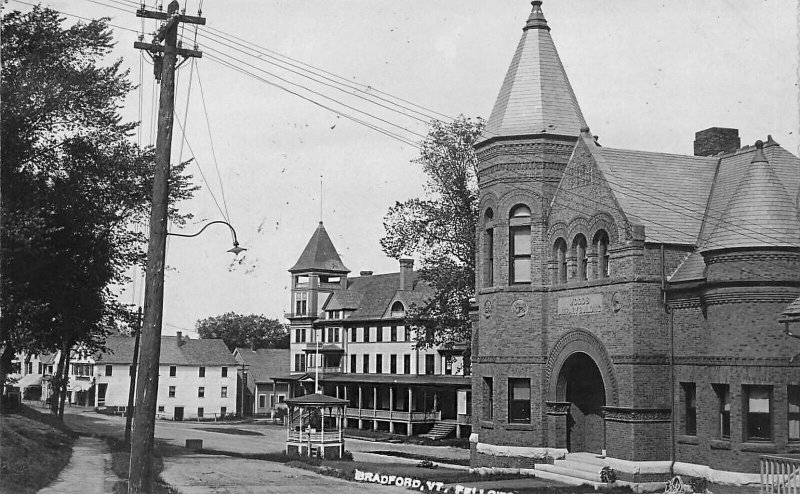
View of library in c. 1915

The earliest name of the settlement was Wait's River Town or Waitstown, in honor of Joseph Wait, a member of Rogers' Rangers. The town was originally part of Gloucester County in the Province of New York before becoming part of Vermont. In 1770, the town was established by New York patent: 3,000 acres (1,200 hectares) were granted on May 3, 1770, and the town was named Mooretown after Sir Henry Moore, 1st Baronet, then the royal governor of New York. On October 23, 1788, at the request of town's residents, the town was renamed Bradford by the Vermont General Assembly, likely after Bradford, Massachusetts. According to the Vermont Encyclopedia, Bradford "has always been an industrial and commercial center for the surrounding rural towns and villages."

== Geography ==
According to the United States Census Bureau, the town has a total area of 29.9 square miles (77 km^{2}), of which 29.8 square miles (77 km^{2}) is land and 0.1 square miles (0.26 km^{2}) (0.20%) is water. The Waits River flows through Bradford in a southeasterly direction to its confluence with the Connecticut River, which forms the eastern boundary of the town. The town rises from the river's meadows through low hills and river valleys and finally Wright's Mountain (at an elevation of 1,822 feet) close to the border with Newbury to the north.

Bradford is bordered by the towns of Newbury to the north, West Fairlee and Fairlee to the south, and Corinth to the west.

Piermont, New Hampshire lies across the Connecticut River to the east. The Piermont Bridge, a Pennsylvania truss bridge erected in 1928, connects Bradford and Piermont.

Bradford is part of the Upper Valley micropolitan region of east-central Vermont and west-central New Hampshire surrounding the Connecticut River.

== Demographics ==
Historical population
Census	Pop.	Note	%±
1790	654		—
1800	1,064		62.7%
1810	1,302		22.4%
1820	1,411		8.4%
1830	1,507		6.8%
1840	1,655		9.8%
1850	1,723		4.1%
1860	1,689		−2.0%
1870	1,492		−11.7%
1880	1,520		1.9%
1890	1,429		−6.0%
1900	1,338		−6.4%
1910	1,372		2.5%
1920	1,422		3.6%
1930	1,235		−13.2%
1940	1,507		22.0%
1950	1,551		2.9%
1960	1,619		4.4%
1970	1,527		−5.7%
1980	2,191		43.5%
1990	2,522		15.1%
2000	2,619		3.8%
2010	2,797		6.8%
2020	2,790		−0.3%
U.S. Decennial Census

As of the census of 2010, there were 2,797 people, 1,281 households, and 692 families residing in the town. The population density was 87.8 people per square mile (33.9 people/km^{2}). There were 1,217 housing units at an average density of 40.8 units per square mile (15.8 units/km^{2}). The racial makeup of the town was 97.71% White, 0.46% Black or African American, 0.46% Native American, 0.23% Asian, 0.15% Pacific Islander, and 0.99% from two or more races. Hispanic or Latino of any race were 0.61% of the population.

There were 1,028 households, out of which 33.8% had children under the age of 18 living with them. 51.8% were married couples living together, 12.5% had a female householder with no husband present, and 32.6% were non-families. 25.5% of all households were made up of individuals, and 11.8% had someone living alone who was 65 years of age or older. The average household size was 2.48 and the average family size was 2.98.

In the town, the population was spread out, with 26.2% under the age of 18, 7.6% from 18 to 24, 25.5% from 25 to 44, 25.1% from 45 to 64, and 15.6% who were 65 years of age or older. The median age was 40 years. For every 100 females, there were 91.0 males. For every 100 females age 18 and over, there were 88.3 males.

The median income for a household in the town was $37,270, and the median income for a family was $42,128. Males had a median income of $30,865 versus $28,857 for females. The per capita income for the town was $18,452. About 7.9% of families and 11.3% of the population were below the poverty line, including 15.5% of those under age 18 and 8.1% of those age 65 or over.

== Education ==
Bradford has two public schools: Bradford Elementary School for kindergarten through grade 6 and Oxbow High School for grades 7–12. Attached to Oxbow High School is the Riverbend Career and Technical Center for adults, a vocational center. Total school enrollment for fiscal year 2017–2018 was 242 at Bradford Elementary and approximately 373 at Oxbow/Riverbend. While Bradford Elementary serves only the Town of Bradford, Oxbow/Riverbend is part of a supervisory union, and so has students from the surrounding area as well. The central office for the Orange East Supervisory Union is located in Bradford.

A branch of Central Vermont Basic Education, which provides curricula for learning basic skills (reading, writing, math and computer literacy), English language that prepares the student for U.S. citizenship, credential programs for high school diplomas and GED, and college and career readiness, is also located in Bradford.

== Transportation ==
The town is crossed by Interstate 91 (6.42 miles (10.33 km) in the town), U.S. Route 5 (5.85 miles (9.41 km)) and Vermont Routes 25 and 25B (8.01 miles (12.89 km)).

Stagecoach Transportation bus service also serves Bradford, with commuter service to points south including Hanover, New Hampshire, Lebanon, New Hampshire and White River Junction, Vermont along its River Route. Stagecoach also provides a "Circulator Route" to shopping and service destinations in the Lower Cohase Region, and provides individual rides to health care and other approved appointments.

== Sites of interest ==
View from Wright's Mountain

The town has a number of scenic views, including of the Connecticut River Valley, Waits River Valley, and White Mountains. Also of note is the view from Wright's Mountain.

- Bradford Village Historic District—added to the National Register of Historic Places in 1975. Currently home to several popular restaurants, a general store and retail shops.
- Bradford Academy/Woods School Building at 172 North Main Street—an 1893 building (with a 1935 addition) that has been held by the town under a 99-year lease. The building houses the town government offices, town police department, and Bradford Historical Society.
- Bradford Public Library—designed by architect Lambert Packard and constructed in 1895.
- Old Church Theater—Permanently located in a 1793 building behind the Congregational Church on Main Street, the Old Church Theater has presented over 28 years of summer productions geared for family entertainment. The organization moved to temporary quarters adjacent to the Orange East Senior Center in November 2017, while the permanent building undergoes restoration. The actors are local residents from various backgrounds and some have gone on to make a career in the theater world. The theater is open to anyone wishing to act, direct, work backstage, help with set design, ticket sales and more.
- Wright's Mountain/Devil's Den Town Forest - Contains more than 500 contiguous protected acres and more than 10 miles of interconnected trails open to all non-motorized recreation. The area was named a National Scenic Trail in 2018.
- The Space on Main—Nonprofit co-working, maker, conference, event, and gallery space opened in 2017 in former Hill's 5 & 10 department store.
- Waits River Falls—also known as Bradford Falls and Bradford Dam. Scenic waterfall over rocky cascade on Waits River along U.S. Route 5 National Scenic Byway, abutting Boch Park picnic area.
- Elizabeth's Park—Playground with classic wooden castle/maze structure, charcoal grills and ice skating rink.
- Statue of Rear Admiral Charles Edgar Clark, captain of the battleship USS Oregon during the Spanish–American War.

== Notable people ==
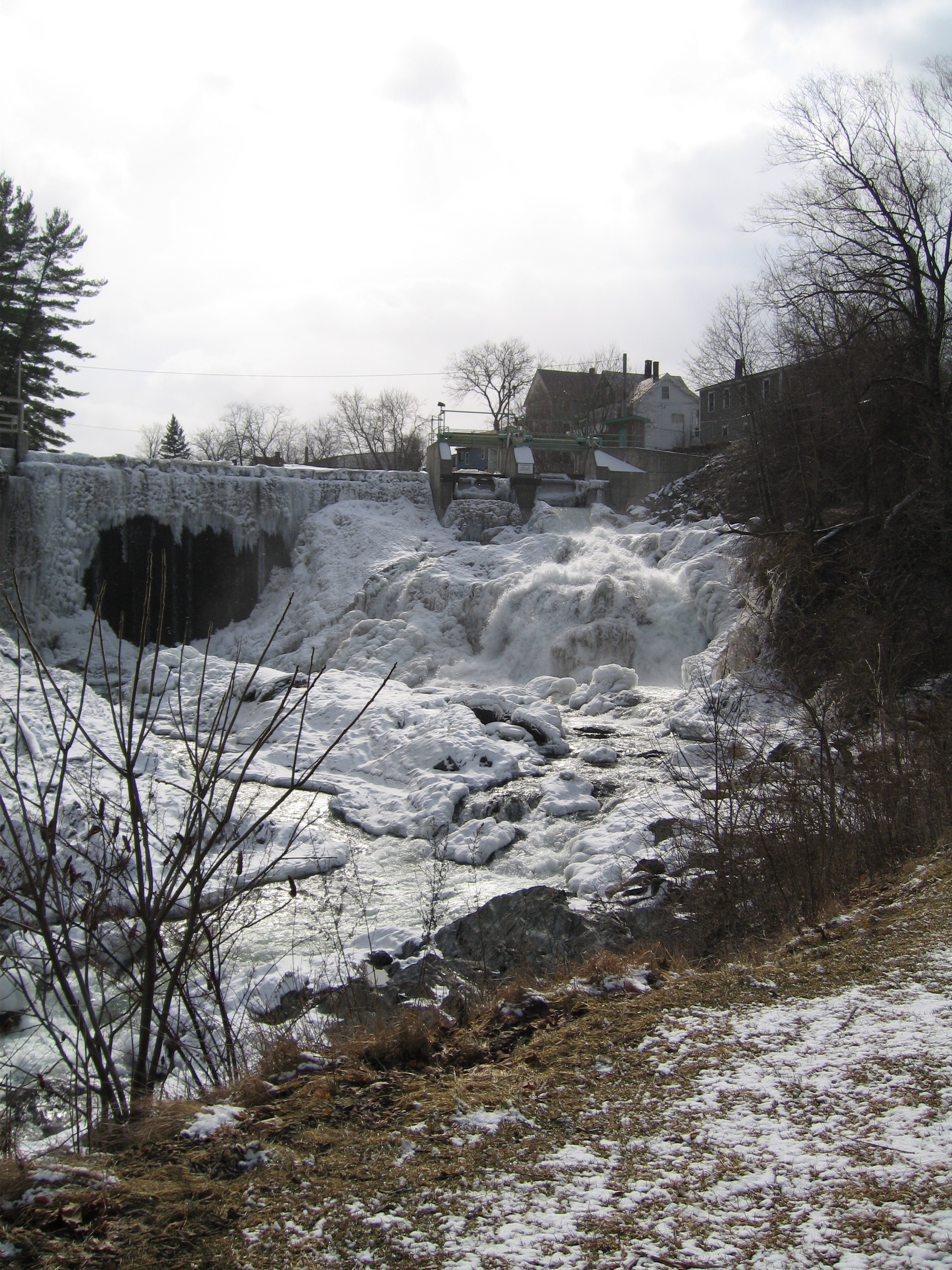
Frozen waterfall in Waits River

- Charles C. P. Baldwin, United States Marshal for the District of Vermont
- William Barron, United States Marshal for the District of Vermont
- John Putnam Chapin, mayor of Chicago; born in Bradford in 1810 and arrived in Chicago in 1832
- Charles Edgar Clark, captain of the USS Oregon during the Spanish–American War – born in Bradford in 1843
- Herbert Thomas Johnson, Adjutant General of the Vermont National Guard and namesake of Camp Johnson, the state National Guard Headquarters
- Thomas Herbert Johnson, expert on the life and works of Emily Dickinson
- Ursula Bailey Marvin, American planetary geologist and author who worked for the Smithsonian Astrophysical Observatory
- Philena McKeen, principal of Abbot Academy in Andover, Massachusetts
- Ned O'Gorman, poet and educator – spent part of his youth in Bradford
- Emily Rebecca Page, poet, spent much of her life in Bradford.
- Albert Sleeper, 29th governor of Michigan – born in Bradford in 1862, moved to Michigan in 1884
- Alexander Lucius Twilight, first African American to receive a degree from an American institution of learning
- Abel Underwood, U.S. Attorney for Vermont and state circuit court judge. Born in Bradford
- John H. Watson, Chief Justice of the Vermont Supreme Court
- James Wilson, first American globe maker – lived in Bradford
- Jay Wright, poet – lives in Bradford

== Works cited ==
- Bradford Town Plan: Adopted September 10, 2009, prepared by the Bradford Planning Commission with assistance from the Two Rivers Ottauquechee Regional Commission
