= James Wilson (globe maker) =

Globe maker from the United States (1763–1855)

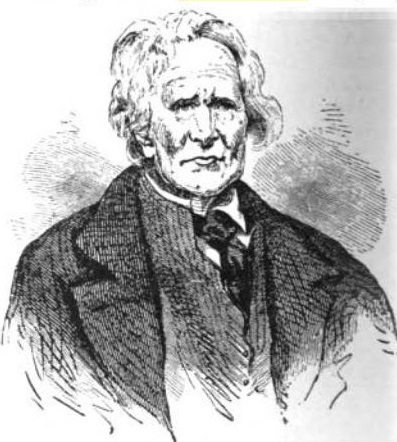
- Born: March 15, 1763; Londonderry, New Hampshire
- Died: March 26, 1855 (aged 92); Bradford, Vermont, US
- Occupation: Globe maker

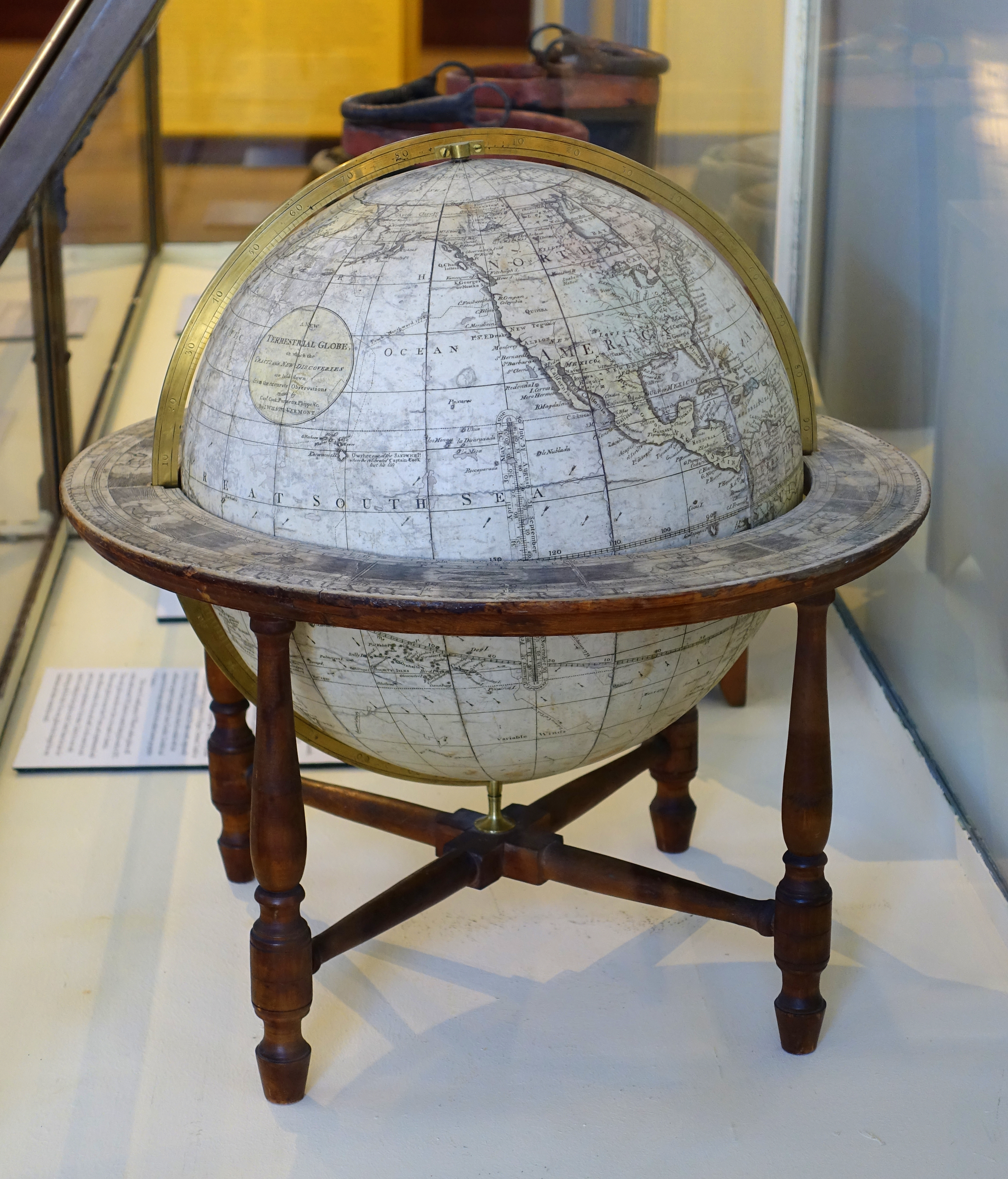
Terrestrial globe by James Wilson, 1810

James Wilson (March 15, 1763 – March 26, 1855) was the first maker of globes in the United States.

== Biography ==
James Wilson was born in Londonderry, New Hampshire on March 15, 1763, the son of James Wilson and Elanor (Hopkins) Wilson. Wilson was raised and educated in Londonderry, farmed with his father, and trained as a blacksmith. He moved to Bradford, Vermont in 1796, became interested in cartography, and taught himself map making. Though he had little formal education, he purchased an encyclopedia to learn geography, learned techniques for engraving, and began making maps with the intention of producing classroom aids for schoolchildren.

When he visited Dartmouth College's European globe collection, Wilson was inspired by a pair of terrestrial and celestial globes. He left determined to create his own, and produced a heavy wooden sphere covered with ink drawings on paper. Though this first attempt was too heavy and took too long to produce for it to be commercially feasible, Wilson continued look for ways to improve his product. He sought out experts in copper engraving, including Amos Doolittle, in order to master their art.

In 1813, Wilson opened the first geographic globe factory in the United States and sold his initial 13 inch globe for $50. The Wilson globes were widely successful, and Wilson expanded to production of sets of celestial and terrestrial globes in various sizes, materials and prices, including printed Papier-mâché, enabling them to be purchased inexpensively for use in schools and homes. Wilson increased his production to meet demand, and in partnership with his sons he opened a second factory in Albany, New York. Wilson remained active until he was over eighty, when he created a planetarium for the Thetford Academy. The planetarium was well received, and he began offering them for sale.

Wilson died in Bradford on March 26, 1855, and was buried at Upper Plain Cemetery in Bradford.

== Family ==
Wilson was first married to Molly Highland, who died in 1786. They were the parents of a son, James, who was born in 1785. Wilson's second wife was Sarah Donaldson, with whom he was the father of 10 children, seven of whom lived to adulthood. In 1805, Wilson married Agnes MacDuffee (1783–1875). They were the parents of four children, three of who lived to adulthood.

== Legacy ==
Wilson's surviving globes are highly prized and can be found in libraries, museums and private collections. The Bradford rest area on Interstate 91 contains a historical marker indicating where his home and workshop stood and commemorating his accomplishments. The Bradford Historical Society Museum's collections include an 1810 Wilson Globe in a custom-made case, which was created by Bradford's Copeland Furniture Company.
