= Waits River Formation =

- Stratigraphic range: Late Silurian to early Devonian
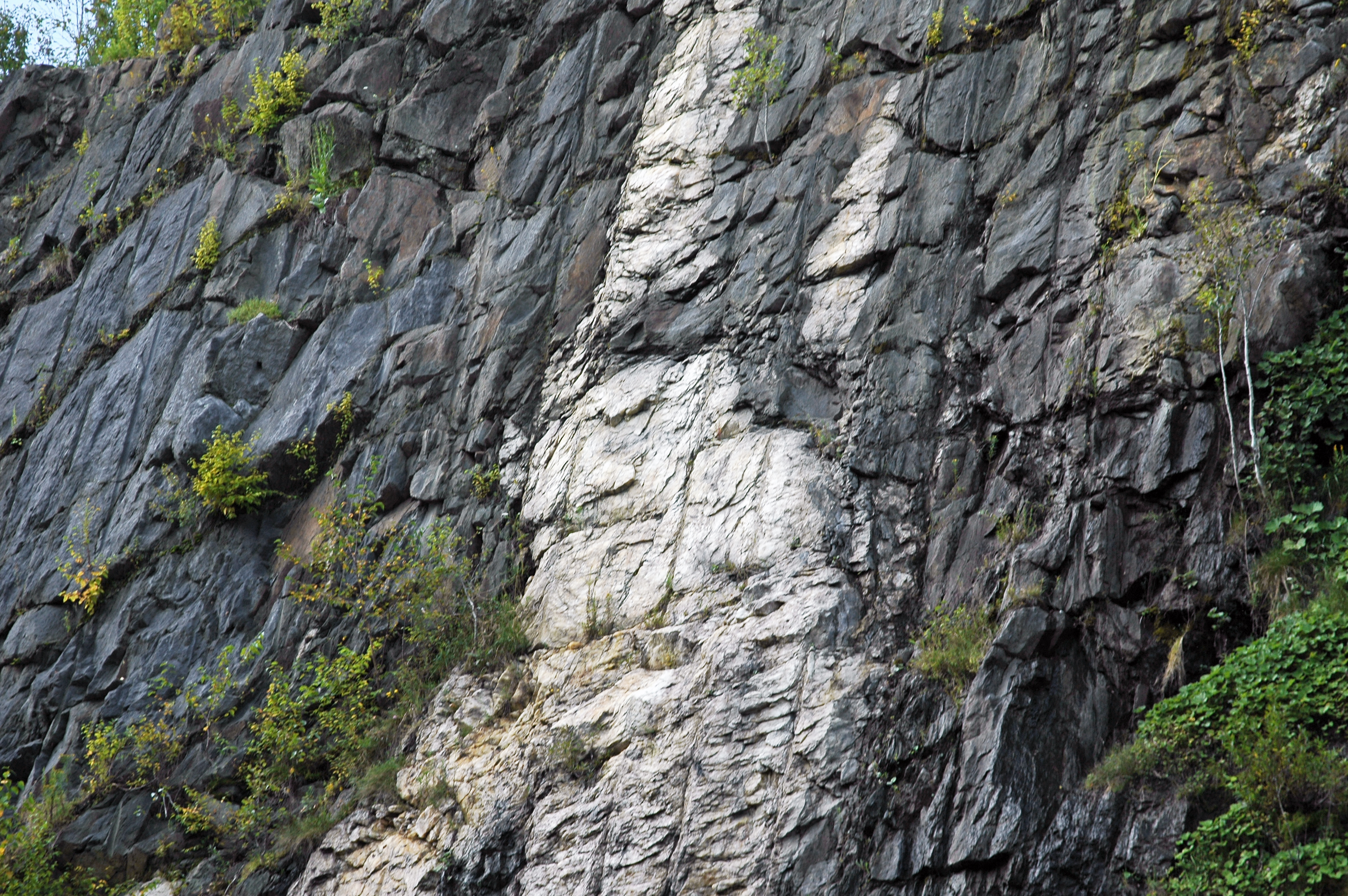
- Garnet schist and quartzite (Waits River Formation in Vermont)
- Type: Sedimentary, metamorphic
- Sub-units: Standing Pond Volcanic Member
- Underlies: Bradford Schist

Lithology
- Primary: Limestone
- Other: Phyllite, schist

Location
- Region: New England
- Country: USA
- Extent: Vermont, Massachusetts, New Hampshire

Type section
- Named for: Village of Waits River (within Topsham) and stream
- Named by: C. H. Richardson, 1906

The Waits River Formation (WRF) is a late Silurian to early Devonian limestone containing lesser amounts of phyllite and schist. It is located in the northern Appalachian Mountains of North America. It ranges from Long Island Sound in Connecticut to the Gulf of St. Lawrence in Quebec (about 1,000 km), and its width ranges from 10–50 km. It is part of the Connecticut Valley–Gaspé Trough, which is present in eastern and northeastern Vermont.

== Geologic setting ==
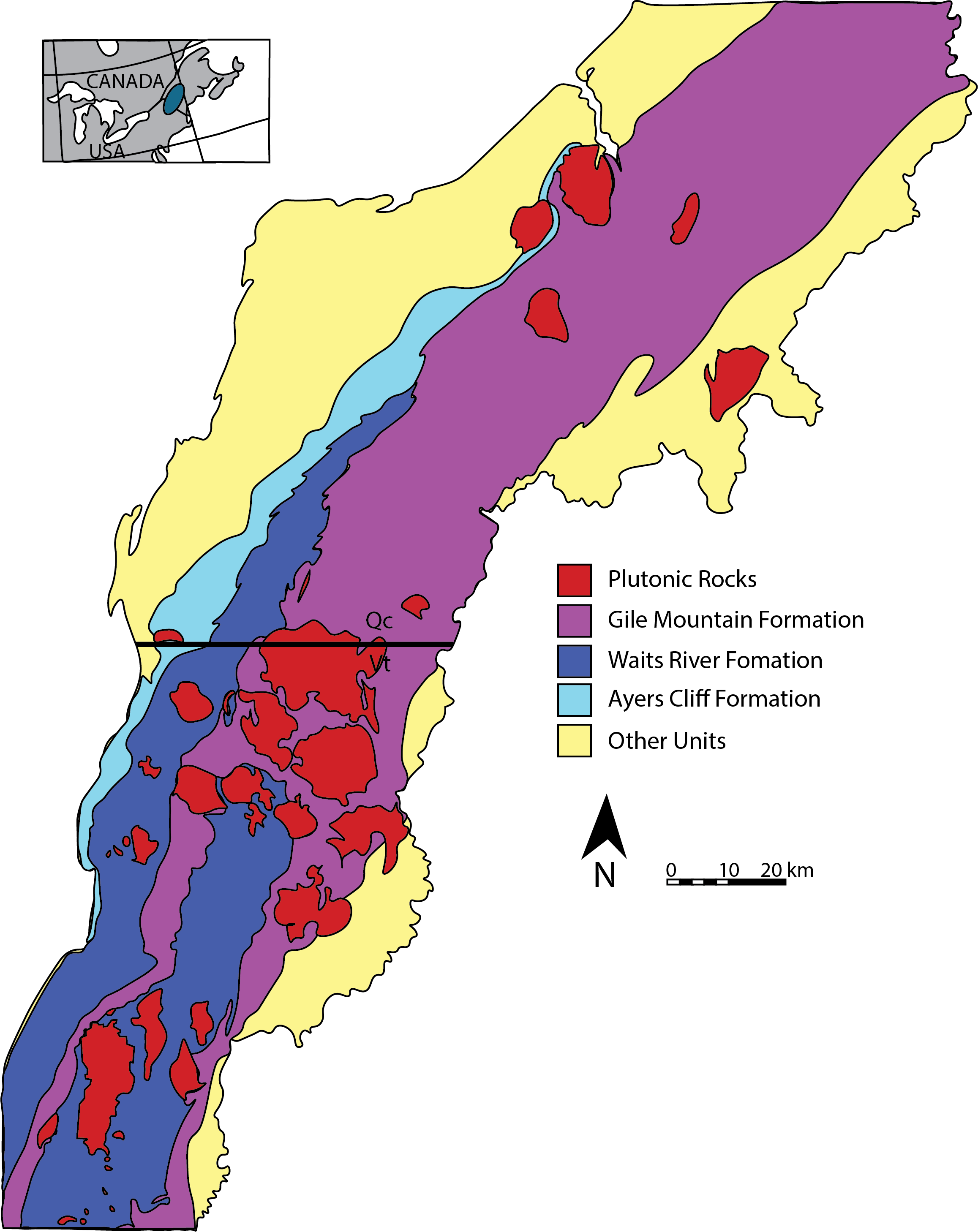
A map of the extent of the Waits River Formation and its surrounding units in the Connecticut Valley-Gaspé Trough. Modified from Perrot (2018)

The Waits River formation was deposited through normal faulting and back-arc extension in the late Silurian period. During the Acadian orogeny, the land mass Gander collided with Laurentia.

The facies of the unit indicates that its protolith was a carbonate rock, formed from a carbonate bank, reef or atolls around volcanic islands.

== Stratigraphy ==
The Waits River Formation is stratigraphically below the Gile Mountain Formation and above the Northfield Slate. It is composed of beds of siliceous marble 4-10 inches thick that are interbedded with weathering mica schist and randomly distributed beds of dark, micaceous quartzite. The distinguishing bed in the formation is a quartzose limestone that is white to blueish-grey. These beds range from 1 inch to 40 feet thick. The Standing Pond Volcanic Member intrudes the Waits River Formation, separating it from the Gile Mountain Formation. The overall formation thickness is 20,000 feet.

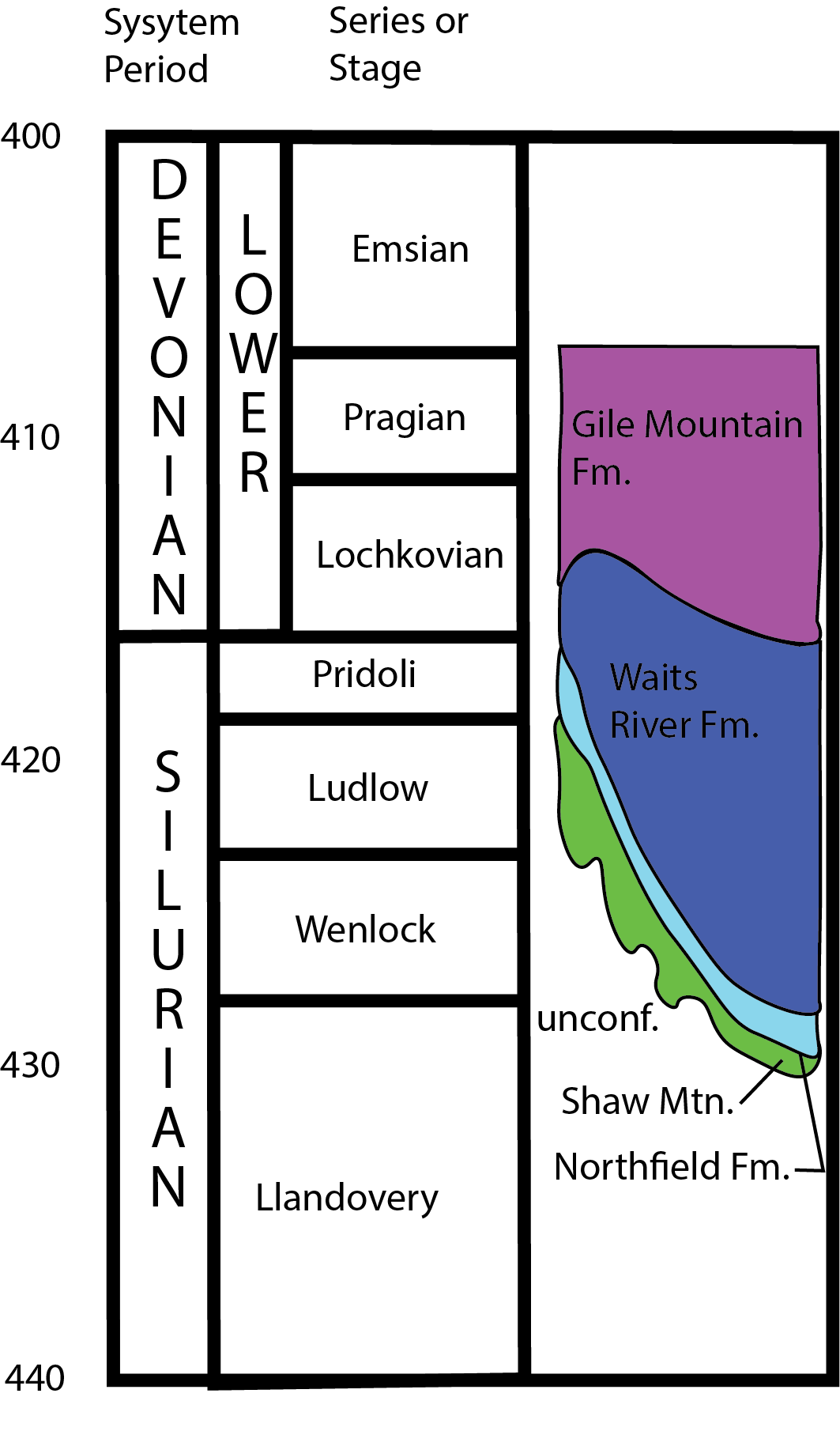
A stratigraphic column of Silurian-Devonian rock units including the Waits River Formation and the units surrounding it in the Connecticut Valley–Gaspé Trough. Modified from McWilliams, et al (2010)

The Waits River Formation is split into two varieties. The Gile Mountain Formation lies between the two varieties of the Waits River Formation. The eastern belt of the Waits River Formation is composed of about 50-80% of punky-brown quartz-carbonate beds with interbedded pelites. The western belt is dark-gray slate/phyllite with minor interbedding of pelites of quartz-carbonate granulite.

== Lithology ==
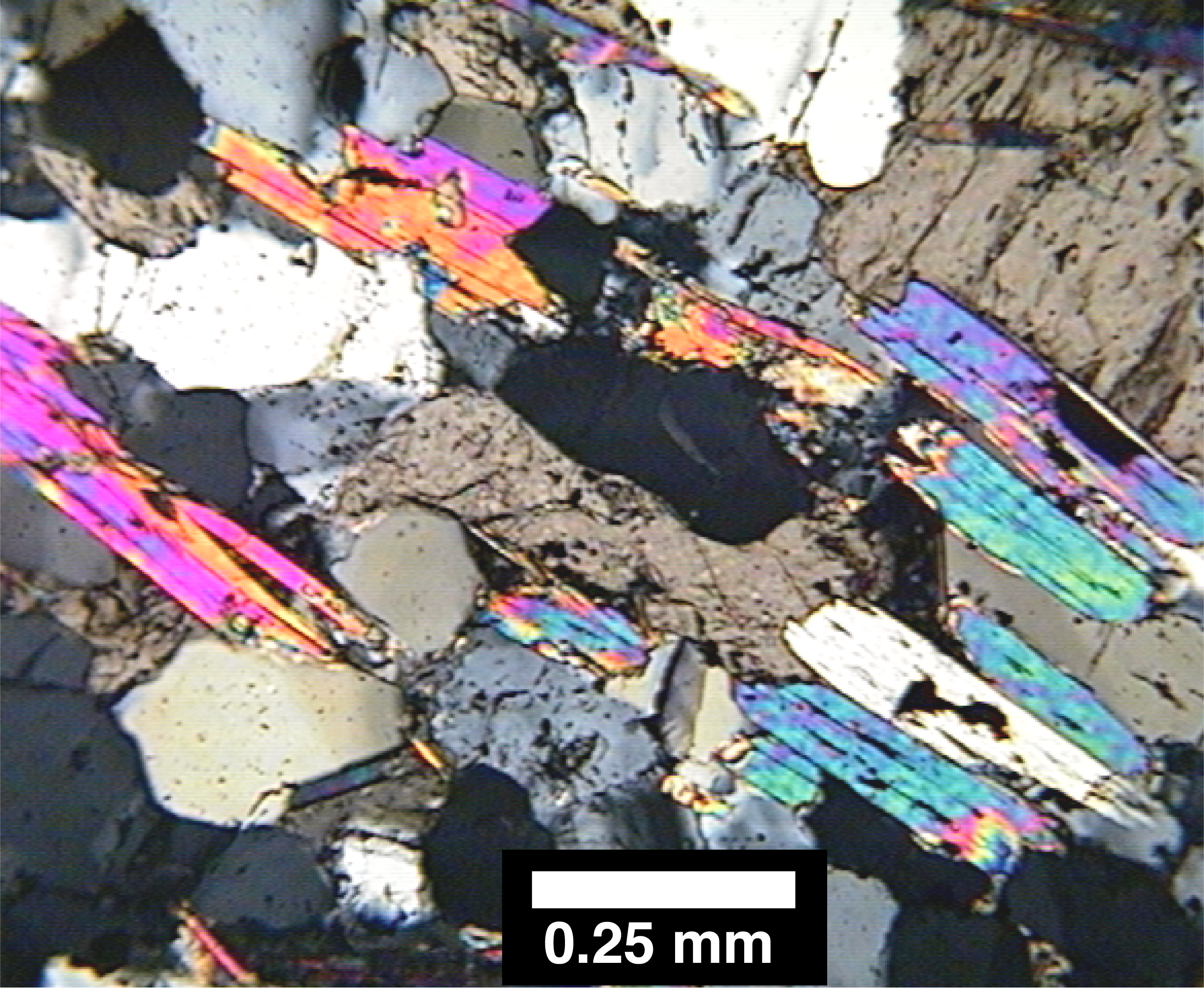
Thin section of the Waits River formation that shows quartz, calcite, plagioclase, muscovite, and biotite. Photo taken by Dr. Sarah Penniston-Dorland.

The Waits River formation is composed of interbedded, weathered marble, quartz-muscovite phyllite, slate, mica-schist, quartzite, and siliceous crystalline limestone, with garnet present throughout.

=== Members of the Waits River Formation ===
- Crow Hill: quartzite
- Barton River: interbedded siliceous limestone and phyllite
- Ayers Cliff: crystalline limestone with thin beds of slate and phyllite
- Standing Pond: Volcanic member with amphibolite, garnet schist, and pillow lavas

=== Metamorphism and fluid flow ===
The Waits River Formation has numerous veins throughout that are composed of a variation of quartz, calcite, muscovite, biotite, pyrrhotite, feldspar, and kyanite. These veins formed during regional metamorphism of various grades ranging from greenschist facies to amphibolite facies. The Waits River Formation was metamorphosed under garnet, kyanite, and chlorite, and biotite zones (500-570 °C).

=== Structure ===
The Waits River Formation is a part of the western belt of the Connecticut Valley-Gaspé Trough. The major geologic structures in the Waits River Formation are a result of two orogenies, the Salinic and Acadian. In the Salinic orogeny that occurred during the late Silurian, the sedimentation of the Connecticut Valley began during this time with the extension of the crust. In the Acadian orogeny, the collision of Avalonia and Laurentia resulted in the metamorphism of the Waits River Formation. The parallel bedding was deformed and exhibits pervasive schistosity and crenulation cleavage. At the region scale, the formation shows a series of recumbent folds and domes from the regional metamorphism.

== Age ==
Zircon dating (^{206}Pb/^{238}U) indicates that the unit is between 418 and 406 million years old (early Devonian).
