= Fairlee (CDP), Vermont =

Census-designated place in Vermont, United States

Fairlee, Vermont
- Census-designated place
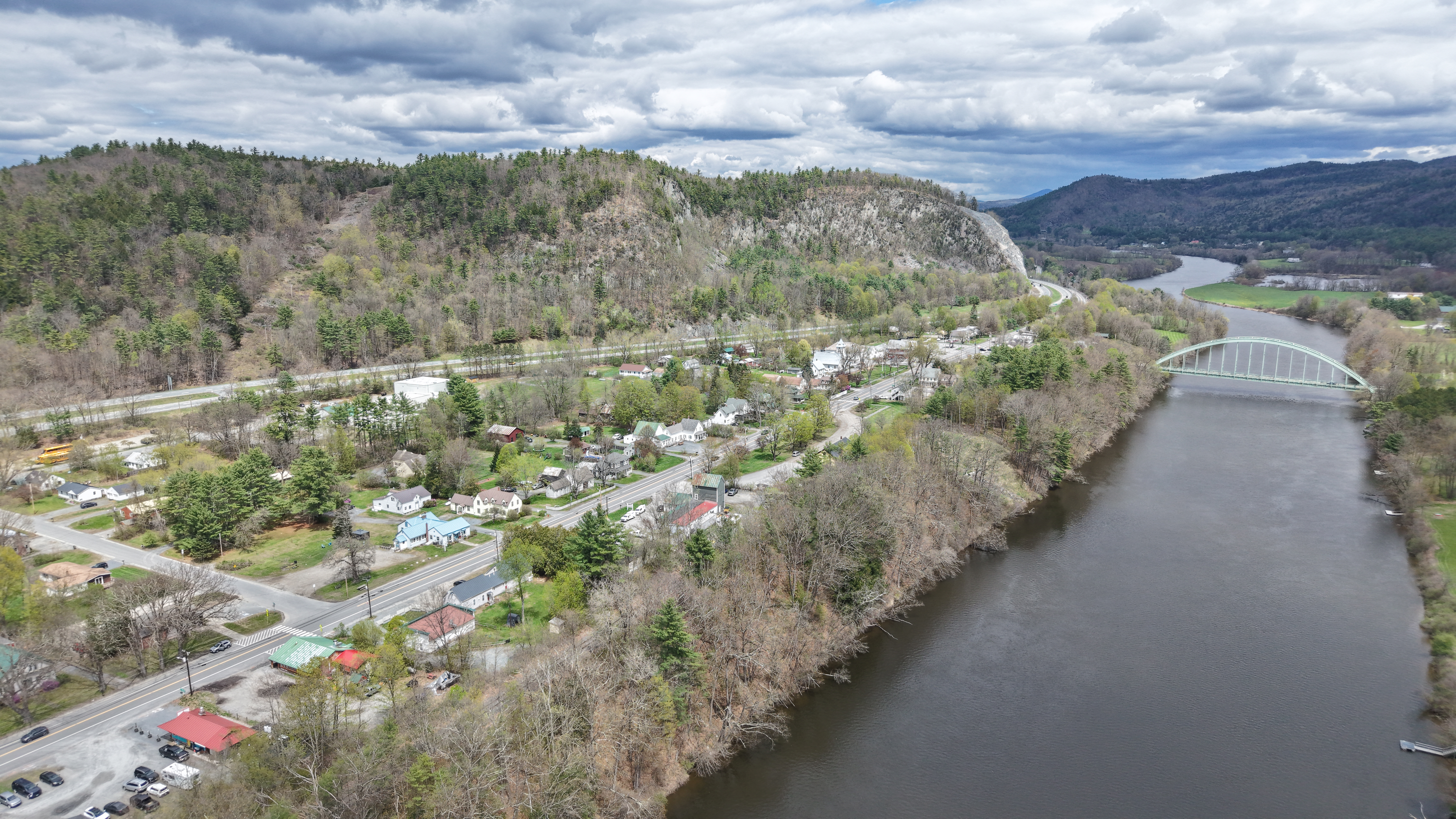
- Fairlee, VT, from the southwest

- Location within Vermont Location within the United States
- Coordinates: 43°53′54″N 72°09′20″W
- Country: United States
- State: Vermont
- County: Orange
- Town: Fairlee

Area
  - Total: 0.66 sq mi (1.71 km^{2})
  - Land: 0.60 sq mi (1.56 km^{2})
  - Water: 0.058 sq mi (0.15 km^{2})
- Elevation: 433 ft (132 m)

Population (2020)
  - Total: 198
- Time zone: UTC-5 (Eastern (EST))
  - Summer (DST): UTC-4 (EDT)
- ZIP Code: 05045
- Area code: 802
- FIPS code: 50-25600
- GNIS feature ID: 2586631

Fairlee is the primary village and a census-designated place (CDP) in the town of Fairlee, Orange County, Vermont, United States. As of the 2020 census, it had a population of 198 out of 988 in the entire town of Fairlee.

== Geography ==
The CDP is on the eastern edge of Orange County, in the southeastern part of the town of Fairlee. It is bordered to the east by the Connecticut River, which forms the Vermont–New Hampshire border. The town of Orford, New Hampshire, is to the east across the river. U.S. Route 5 passes through the center of the village, and Interstate 91 runs along the western edge. Both highways lead north 7 miles (11 km) to Bradford and south the same distance to Thetford. Vermont Route 25A leads east 350 feet (110 m) to the Samuel Morey Memorial Bridge across the Connecticut River, at which point it becomes New Hampshire Route 25A, leading into Orford.
