= West Newbury, Vermont =

- Village
- Location within Vermont Location within the United States
- Coordinates: 44°03′52″N 72°07′29″W
- Country: United States
- State: Vermont
- County: Orange
- Elevation: 909 ft (277 m)
- Time zone: UTC-5 (Eastern (EST))
  - Summer (DST): UTC-4 (EDT)
- ZIP code: 05085
- Area code: 802
- GNIS feature ID: 1460162

West Newbury is a small unincorporated village within the town of Newbury, in Orange County, Vermont, United States. The community is 3.5 miles (5.6 km) west-southwest of the somewhat larger village of Newbury. West Newbury has a post office with ZIP code 05085.
