= Middlesex Savings Bank =

Financial institution in the United States

- Type: Private
- Industry: banking
- Founded: 1835
- Headquarters: Natick, Massachusetts, United States
- Number of locations: Acton, West Acton, Ashland, Bedford, Bellingham, Boxborough, Concord, West Concord, Framingham, Franklin, Groton, Holliston, Hopkinton, Hudson, Littleton, Maynard, Medfield, Medway, Millis, Natick, Needham, Sherborn, Southborough, Sudbury, Walpole, Wayland, Wellesley, Westborough, Westford, Worcester Massachusetts
- Key people: Dana Neshe, Chair, President & CEO
- Services: banking
- Website: www.middlesexbank.com

Middlesex Savings Bank is a Massachusetts bank headquartered in Natick, Massachusetts, and founded in 1835. It is one of the largest mutual banks in Massachusetts with more than $6 billion in assets and 32 branches in the western Boston suburbs.

== History ==
The Middlesex Institution for Savings was founded on March 4, 1835, in Concord, Massachusetts. Natick Five Cents Savings Bank was founded in 1859. Medway Savings Bank was founded in 1871.
