= Corinth, Vermont =

- Town
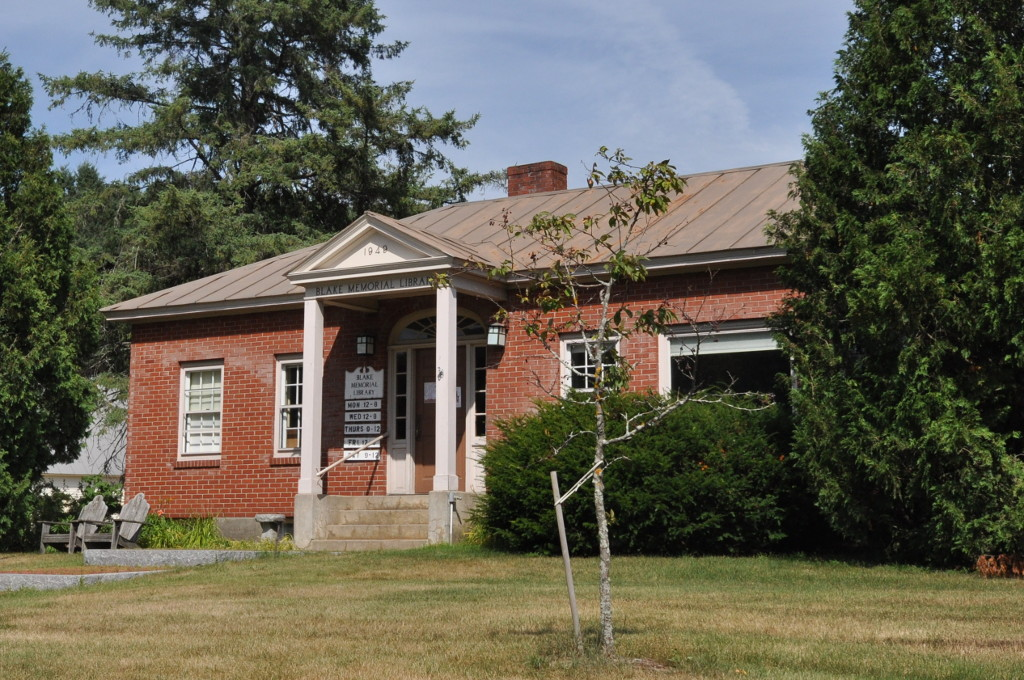
- Blake Memorial Library, East Corinth village

- Seal

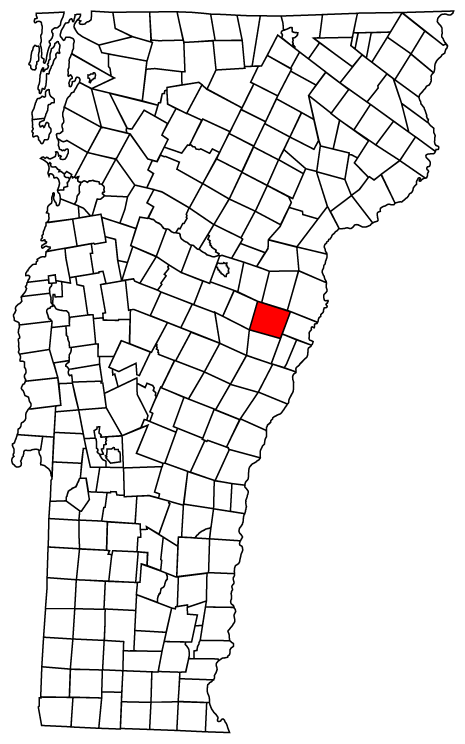
- Corinth, Vermont
- Coordinates: 44°01′40″N 72°16′37″W
- Country: United States
- State: Vermont
- County: Orange
- Communities: Cookville; Corinth Center; Corinth Corners; East Corinth; Goose Green; South Corinth; West Corinth

Area
  - Total: 48.6 sq mi (125.8 km^{2})
  - Land: 48.5 sq mi (125.7 km^{2})
  - Water: 0 sq mi (0.0 km^{2})
- Elevation: 1,450 ft (440 m)

Population (2020)
  - Total: 1,455
  - Density: 30/sq mi (11.6/km^{2})
- Time zone: UTC-5 (Eastern (EST))
  - Summer (DST): UTC-4 (EDT)
- ZIP Codes: 05039 (Corinth); 05040 (East Corinth); 05033 (Bradford); 05086 (West Topsham)
- Area code: 802
- FIPS code: 50-15700
- GNIS feature ID: 1462075
- Website: corinthvt.org

Corinth (/kəˈrɪnθ/ kə-RINTH) is a town in Orange County, Vermont, United States. The population was 1,455 at the 2020 census.

Local services include a general store, post office, doctor's office, library, and ball field.

== Geography ==
According to the United States Census Bureau, the town has a total area of 48.5 square miles (125.7 km^{2}), of which 48.5 square miles (125.7 km^{2}) is land and 0.04 square mile (0.1 km^{2}) (0.04%) is water. The Waits River flows through northeastern Corinth.

Corinth contains seven villages: East Corinth, West Corinth, South Corinth, Corinth Center, Corinth Corners, Cookville, and Goose Green.

=== Climate ===
Climate data for Corinth, Vermont, 1991–2020 normals, 2008-2022 snowfall: 1180ft (360m)
Month	Jan	Feb	Mar	Apr	May	Jun	Jul	Aug	Sep	Oct	Nov	Dec	Year
Mean daily maximum °F (°C)	25.2 (−3.8)	28.2 (−2.1)	37.2 (2.9)	50.7 (10.4)	63.4 (17.4)	72.0 (22.2)	76.9 (24.9)	74.3 (23.5)	66.9 (19.4)	55.1 (12.8)	42.2 (5.7)	31.2 (−0.4)	51.9 (11.1)
Daily mean °F (°C)	14.7 (−9.6)	16.8 (−8.4)	26.7 (−2.9)	39.7 (4.3)	52.1 (11.2)	61.1 (16.2)	66.3 (19.1)	63.0 (17.2)	55.9 (13.3)	44.7 (7.1)	33.5 (0.8)	22.6 (−5.2)	41.4 (5.3)
Mean daily minimum °F (°C)	4.2 (−15.4)	5.5 (−14.7)	16.2 (−8.8)	28.7 (−1.8)	40.9 (4.9)	50.2 (10.1)	55.6 (13.1)	51.7 (10.9)	44.8 (7.1)	34.3 (1.3)	24.8 (−4.0)	13.9 (−10.1)	30.9 (−0.6)
Average precipitation inches (mm)	3.01 (76)	2.48 (63)	2.93 (74)	3.40 (86)	3.77 (96)	4.39 (112)	4.30 (109)	3.93 (100)	3.53 (90)	4.53 (115)	3.24 (82)	3.64 (92)	43.15 (1,095)
Average snowfall inches (cm)	21.7 (55)	26.2 (67)	15.9 (40)	4.8 (12)	0.4 (1.0)	0.0 (0.0)	0.0 (0.0)	0.0 (0.0)	0.0 (0.0)	0.9 (2.3)	7.1 (18)	22.1 (56)	99.1 (251.3)
Source 1: NOAA
Source 2: XMACIS (snowfall)

== Demographics ==
Historical population
Census	Pop.	Note	%±
1790	578		—
1800	1,410		143.9%
1810	1,876		33.0%
1820	1,907		1.7%
1830	1,953		2.4%
1840	1,970		0.9%
1850	1,906		−3.2%
1860	1,627		−14.6%
1870	1,470		−9.6%
1880	1,627		10.7%
1890	1,027		−36.9%
1900	978		−4.8%
1910	1,005		2.8%
1920	936		−6.9%
1930	817		−12.7%
1940	822		0.6%
1950	786		−4.4%
1960	775		−1.4%
1970	683		−11.9%
1980	904		32.4%
1990	1,244		37.6%
2000	1,461		17.4%
2010	1,367		−6.4%
2020	1,455		6.4%
U.S. Decennial Census

As of the census of 2000, there were 1,461 people [1,367 per 2010, a loss of 96 people. All other statistics are per the 2000 census, including the following], 535 households, and 410 families residing in the town. The population density was 30.1 people per square mile (11.6/km^{2}). There were 728 housing units at an average density of 15.0 per square mile (5.8/km^{2}). The racial makeup of the town was 98.77% White, 0.21% African American, 0.21% Native American, 0.14% from other races, and 0.68% from two or more races. Hispanic or Latino of any race were 1.03% of the population.

There were 535 households, out of which 36.4% had children under the age of 18 living with them, 60.4% were married couples living together, 9.3% had a female householder with no husband present, and 23.2% were non-families. 16.4% of all households were made up of individuals, and 7.3% had someone living alone who was 65 years of age or older. The average household size was 2.73 and the average family size was 3.02.

In the town, the population was spread out, with 28.1% under the age of 18, 5.5% from 18 to 24, 28.4% from 25 to 44, 25.4% from 45 to 64, and 12.5% who were 65 years of age or older. The median age was 38 years. For every 100 females, there were 99.3 males. For every 100 females age 18 and over, there were 97.4 males.

The median income for a household in the town was $32,198, and the median income for a family was $33,646. Males had a median income of $29,964 versus $23,646 for females. The per capita income for the town was $14,431. About 7.1% of families and 10.7% of the population were below the poverty line, including 12.2% of those under age 18 and 7.7% of those age 65 or over.

== Media ==
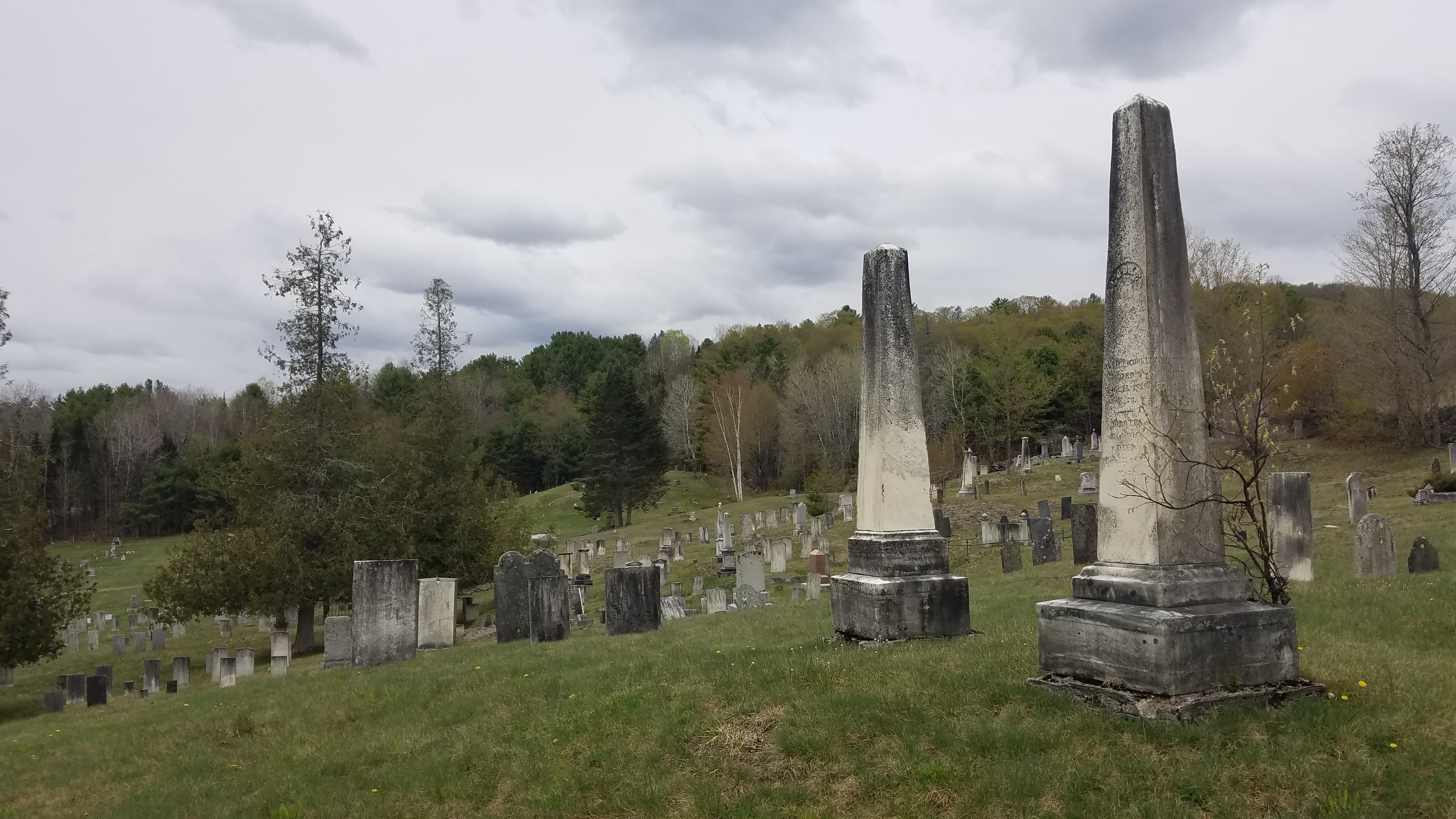
Cemetery in Corinth (2021)

The outdoor scenes of Tim Burton's film Beetlejuice (1988) were filmed in East Corinth.

== Notable people ==
- Tania Aebi – American sailor
- Hale K. Darling – American attorney and politician
- John Lawrence Grattan – US Cavalry officer (1830–1854)
- Patricia Neway – American opera & theater singer (1919–2012)
- Reuben Robie – American politician (1799–1872)
- Alexander Twilight – American politician (1795–1857)
