= Waits River =

Coordinates: 44.0895088°N 72.2820404°W

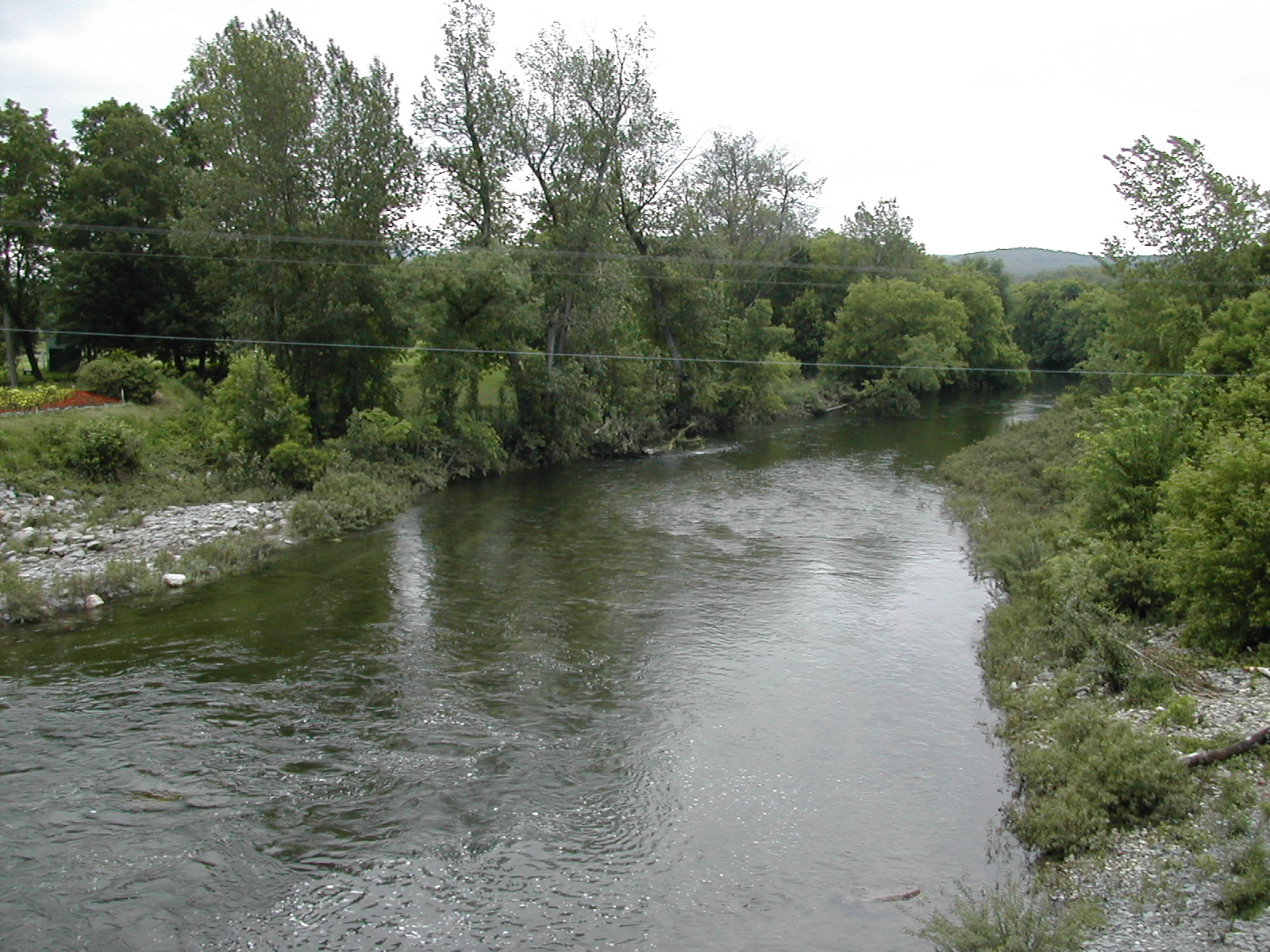
- The Waits River in Bradford, Vermont in 2002

Location
- Country: United States

Physical characteristics
- Source
  - location: Groton, Vermont
- Mouth
  - location: Connecticut River at Bradford, Vermont
- Length: 24.5 miles (39.4 km)

The Waits River is a 24.5-mile-long (39.4 km) river in eastern Vermont in the United States. It is a tributary of the Connecticut River, which flows to Long Island Sound. According to the Geographic Names Information System, it has also been known historically as "Wait's River" and as "Ma-houn-quam-mas-see." The Waits River Formation is a rock unit named after the river since it underlies most of the river.

The Waits River rises in southwestern Caledonia County in the town of Groton and shortly enters Orange County, where it flows generally southeastwardly through the towns of Orange, Topsham, Corinth and Bradford, to the village of Bradford where it joins the Connecticut River.

In the town of Bradford, it collects a short stream known as the South Branch Waits River, which flows eastwardly from Corinth. Further upstream, just south of the village of East Corinth, the Waits collects another tributary known as the Tabor Branch Waits River. The Tabor rises in the northwestern section of the Town of Topsham in an area known as "The Territory" as two smaller branches and flows southeasterly to the village of East Topsham, then southerly toward and through East Corinth.

== See also ==
- List of Vermont rivers
