= Orange County, Vermont =

County in Vermont, United States

- County
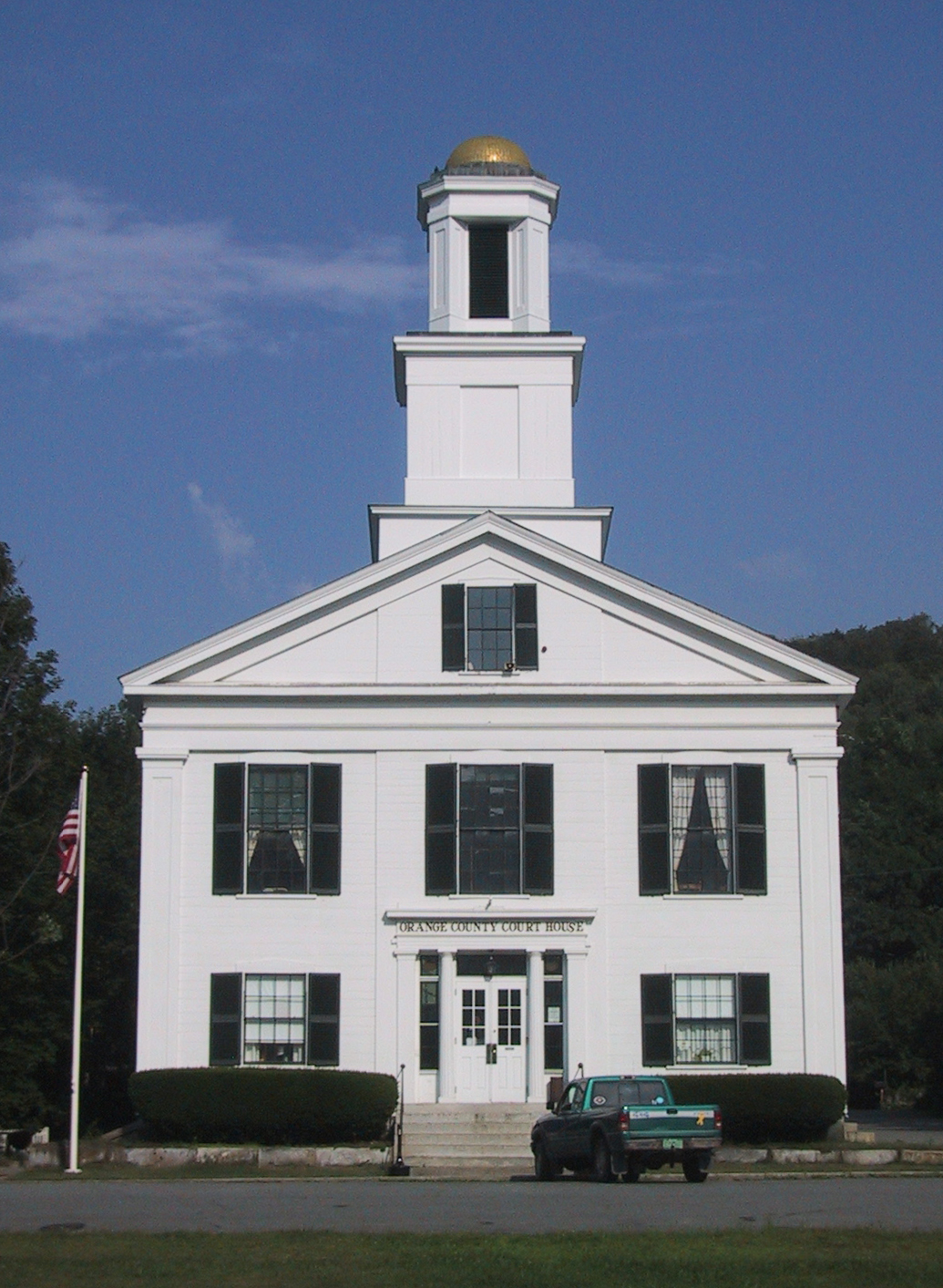
- Orange County Superior Court in Chelsea

- Location within the U.S. state of Vermont
- Coordinates: 43°59′45″N 72°22′30″W
- Country: United States
- State: Vermont
- Chartered: August 11, 1781
- Named for: William of Orange (William III of England)
- Shire Town: Chelsea
- Largest town: Randolph

Area
  - Total: 692 sq mi (1,790 km^{2})
  - Land: 687 sq mi (1,780 km^{2})
  - Water: 5.2 sq mi (13 km^{2}) 0.8%

Population (2020)
  - Total: 29,277
  - Estimate (2025): 30,002 ▲
  - Density: 42.6/sq mi (16.5/km^{2})
- Time zone: UTC−5 (Eastern)
  - Summer (DST): UTC−4 (EDT)
- Congressional district: At-large

Orange County is a county located in the U.S. state of Vermont. As of the 2020 census, the population was 29,277. Its shire town (county seat) is the town of Chelsea. Orange County was chartered on August 11, 1781.

== Geography ==
According to the U.S. Census Bureau, the county has an area of 692 square miles (1,790 km^{2}), of which 687 square miles (1,780 km^{2}) is land and 5.2 square miles (13 km^{2}) (0.8%) is water. Orange County is located near the geographic center of the state.

Despite Orange County's hilly terrain, several major routes cross the county. The county is served by both of Vermont's main Interstate highways; with Interstate 89 running north–south through the western side of the county, and Interstate 91 running north–south along the county's eastern edge and the New Hampshire state line. In addition to the Interstates, two U.S. Routes also enter Orange County. U.S. Route 5 parallels I-91 in a north–south route along the county's eastern edge, while U.S. Route 302 runs east–west along the county's northern border with Caledonia County. There are also several Vermont state routes located partially or fully within Orange County. Vermont Route 12, Vermont Route 14, Vermont Route 25, and Vermont Route 110 are all north–south routes, while Vermont Route 66 and Vermont Route 113 are east–west routes.

=== Adjacent counties ===
- Caledonia County – northeast
- Grafton County, New Hampshire – east
- Windsor County – southwest
- Addison County – west
- Washington County – northwest

== Demographics ==
Historical population
Census	Pop.	Note	%±
1790	10,526		—
1800	18,238		73.3%
1810	25,247		38.4%
1820	24,681		−2.2%
1830	27,285		10.6%
1840	27,873		2.2%
1850	27,296		−2.1%
1860	25,455		−6.7%
1870	23,090		−9.3%
1880	23,525		1.9%
1890	19,575		−16.8%
1900	19,313		−1.3%
1910	18,703		−3.2%
1920	17,279		−7.6%
1930	16,694		−3.4%
1940	17,048		2.1%
1950	17,027		−0.1%
1960	16,014		−5.9%
1970	17,676		10.4%
1980	22,739		28.6%
1990	26,149		15.0%
2000	28,226		7.9%
2010	28,936		2.5%
2020	29,277		1.2%
2025 (est.)	30,002	▲	2.5%
U.S. Decennial Census; 1790–1960 1900–1990; 1990–2000 2010–2018

=== 2020 census ===
As of the 2020 census, the county had a population of 29,277. Of the residents, 19.1% were under the age of 18 and 22.4% were 65 years of age or older; the median age was 46.5 years. For every 100 females there were 99.9 males, and for every 100 females age 18 and over there were 97.7 males.

The racial makeup of the county was 92.1% White, 0.6% Black or African American, 0.5% American Indian and Alaska Native, 0.6% Asian, 0.7% from some other race, and 5.6% from two or more races. Hispanic or Latino residents of any race comprised 1.6% of the population.

There were 12,364 households in the county, of which 25.3% had children under the age of 18 living with them and 23.6% had a female householder with no spouse or partner present. About 28.7% of all households were made up of individuals and 13.6% had someone living alone who was 65 years of age or older.

There were 14,953 housing units, of which 17.3% were vacant. Among occupied housing units, 78.7% were owner-occupied and 21.3% were renter-occupied. The homeowner vacancy rate was 1.6% and the rental vacancy rate was 7.5%.

Orange County, Vermont – Racial and ethnic composition Note: the US Census treats Hispanic/Latino as an ethnic category. This table excludes Latinos from the racial categories and assigns them to a separate category. Hispanics/Latinos may be of any race.
Race / Ethnicity (NH = Non-Hispanic)	Pop 2000	Pop 2010	Pop 2020	% 2000	% 2010	% 2020
White alone (NH)	27,533	27,898	26,852	97.54%	96.41%	90.79%
Black or African American alone (NH)	64	107	151	0.22%	0.36%	0.51%
Native American or Alaska Native alone (NH)	71	78	113	0.25%	0.26%	0.38%
Asian alone (NH)	94	137	160	0.33%	0.47%	0.54%
Pacific Islander alone (NH)	10	3	5	0.03%	0.01%	0.01%
Other race alone (NH)	25	25	119	0.08%	0.08%	0.40%
Mixed race or Multiracial (NH)	264	406	1,400	0.93%	1.40%	4.78%
Hispanic or Latino (any race)	165	282	477	0.58%	0.97%	1.62%
Total	28,226	28,936	29,277	100.00%	100.00%	100.00%

=== 2010 census ===
As of the 2010 United States census, the county had 28,936 people, 11,887 households, and 7,865 families. The population density was 42.1 inhabitants per square mile (16.3/km^{2}). There were 14,845 housing units at an average density of 21.6 per square mile (8.3/km^{2}).

The county's racial makeup was 97.0% white, 0.5% Asian, 0.4% black or African American, 0.3% American Indian, 0.3% from other races, and 1.5% from two or more races. Those of Hispanic or Latino origin made up 1.0% of the population. The largest ancestry groups were English (22.4%), Irish (16.5%); French (14.7%), German (10.4%), "American" (7.3%), French Canadian (7.1%), Italian (6.5%); Scottish (6.5%).

Of the 11,887 households, 28.3% had children under age 18 living with them, 51.9% were married couples living together, 9.3% had a female householder with no husband present, 33.8% were non-families, and 25.9% of all households were made up of individuals. The average household size was 2.37 and the average family size was 2.83. The median age was 43.8 years.

The county's median household income was $52,079 and the median family income was $61,221. Males had a median income of $41,281 versus $35,938 for females. The county's per capita income was $25,951. About 6.2% of families and 10.0% of the population were below the poverty line, including 13.2% of those under age 18 and 7.2% of those age 65 or over.

=== 2000 census ===
As of the census of 2000, the county had 28,226 people, 10,936 households, and 7,611 families. The population density was 41 people per square mile (16 people/km^{2}). There were 13,386 housing units at an average density of 19 per square mile (7.3/km^{2}).

The county's racial makeup was 98.02% White, 0.24% Black or African American, 0.27% Native American, 0.35% Asian, 0.04% Pacific Islander, 0.13% from other races, and 0.95% from two or more races. 0.58% of the population were Hispanic or Latino of any race. 24.3% were of English, 12.8% French, 11.5% American, 10.8% Irish, 6.0% German and 5.5% French Canadian ancestry. 97.4% spoke English and 1.5% French as their first language.

There were 10,936 households, of which 33.40% had children under the age of 18 living with them, 56.10% were married couples living together, 8.90% had a female householder with no husband present, and 30.40% were non-families. 23.40% of all households were made up of individuals, and 9.20% had someone living alone who was 65 years of age or older. The average household size was 2.52 and the average family size was 2.97.

25.60% of the county's population was under age 18, 7.80% was from age 18 to 24, 28.20% was from age 25 to 44, 25.60% was from age 45 to 64, and 12.80% was age 65 or older.

The median age was 39 years. For every 100 females, there were 99.20 males. For every 100 females age 18 and over, there were 96.60 males.

The county's median household income was $39,855, and the median family income was $45,771. Males had a median income of $30,679 versus $24,144 for females. The county's per capita income was $18,784. About 6.10% of families and 9.10% of the population were below the poverty line, including 11.40% of those under age 18 and 8.80% of those age 65 or over.

== Government ==
As in all Vermont counties, there is a small executive function that is mostly consolidated at the state level. Remaining county government is judicial. There are no "county taxes."

=== Legislators ===
Towns in Orange County are represented in four Vermont Senate Districts. The Orange Senate district includes most of Orange County. It is represented in the Vermont Senate by Mark A. MacDonald (D).

The Washington Senate district includes the Towns of Braintree and Orange, both in Orange County, as well as all of Washington County and the Town of Stowe in Lamoille County. It is represented in the Vermont Senate by Ann Cummings (D), Andrew Perchlik (D), and Anne Watson (D).

The Windsor Senate district includes the Town of Thetford, in Orange County, as well as most of Windsor County. It is represented in the Vermont Senate by Alison Clarkson (D), Dick McCormack (D), and Rebecca White (D).

The Caledonia Senate district includes the Town of Newbury, in Orange County, as well as most of Caledonia County. It is represented in the Vermont Senate by Jane Kitchel (D).

== Politics ==
In 1828, Orange County was won by National Republican Party candidate John Quincy Adams.

In 1832, the county was won by Anti-Masonic Party candidate William Wirt.

From William Henry Harrison in 1836 to Winfield Scott in 1852, the county would vote the Whig Party candidates.

From John C. Frémont in 1856 to Richard Nixon in 1960 (barring 1912, where the county was won by Progressive Party candidate and former president Theodore Roosevelt), the Republican Party would have a 104-year winning streak in the county.

In 1964, the county was won by Democratic Party incumbent President Lyndon B. Johnson, who became not only the first Democratic presidential candidate to win Orange County, but the first to win the state of Vermont entirely.

Following the Democrats victory in 1964, the county went back to voting for Republican candidates for another 20 year winning streak starting with Richard Nixon in 1968 and ending with George H. W. Bush in 1988.

The county would be won by Bill Clinton in both the 1992 and 1996 presidential elections.

George W. Bush would win Orange County in 2000 and would be the last time a Republican presidential candidate would carry the county.

John Kerry won the county in 2004, and Orange County has been won by the Democratic candidates in presidential elections since then.

In 2024, no candidates filed to run for high bailiff of Orange County, and two write-in candidates campaigned for the post. The winner of that race was Christopher Helali, a social studies teacher and member of the American Communist Party. Helali would move to Russia while still occupying the official role, as Vermont has no residency requirement for the position. United24Media reported that in October 2026, Helali had joined the Russian military, though no U.S. law restricts citizens from serving in other country's armed forces.

United States presidential election results for Orange County, Vermont
Year	Republican		Democratic		Third party(ies)	
Year	No.	%	No.	%	No.	%
1880	3,107	65.14%	1,631	34.19%	32	0.67%
1884	2,351	60.50%	1,392	35.82%	143	3.68%
1888	2,792	62.61%	1,277	28.64%	390	8.75%
1892	2,395	66.18%	1,088	30.06%	136	3.76%
1896	3,067	80.20%	567	14.83%	190	4.97%
1900	2,515	75.32%	740	22.16%	84	2.52%
1904	2,259	77.13%	587	20.04%	83	2.83%
1908	2,262	74.46%	667	21.96%	109	3.59%
1912	1,289	34.19%	956	25.36%	1,525	40.45%
1916	2,151	59.31%	1,379	38.02%	97	2.67%
1920	3,713	78.93%	938	19.94%	53	1.13%
1924	4,657	82.85%	724	12.88%	240	4.27%
1928	5,223	84.69%	914	14.82%	30	0.49%
1932	4,305	69.30%	1,830	29.46%	77	1.24%
1936	4,956	73.28%	1,796	26.56%	11	0.16%
1940	4,527	68.81%	2,029	30.84%	23	0.35%
1944	4,117	73.77%	1,464	26.23%	0	0.00%
1948	4,061	76.97%	1,139	21.59%	76	1.44%
1952	5,610	83.49%	1,082	16.10%	27	0.40%
1956	5,616	83.95%	1,072	16.02%	2	0.03%
1960	5,363	77.23%	1,581	22.77%	0	0.00%
1964	2,723	41.00%	3,918	58.99%	1	0.02%
1968	4,135	66.16%	1,879	30.06%	236	3.78%
1972	5,389	69.12%	2,332	29.91%	76	0.97%
1976	4,768	58.61%	3,171	38.98%	196	2.41%
1980	4,656	49.52%	3,079	32.75%	1,667	17.73%
1984	6,407	60.24%	4,088	38.44%	140	1.32%
1988	6,151	54.35%	4,977	43.97%	190	1.68%
1992	4,249	31.69%	5,774	43.06%	3,387	25.26%
1996	4,043	32.96%	6,107	49.79%	2,116	17.25%
2000	6,858	46.67%	6,694	45.55%	1,143	7.78%
2004	6,421	43.11%	8,159	54.78%	315	2.11%
2008	5,047	33.25%	9,799	64.56%	333	2.19%
2012	4,588	32.65%	9,076	64.58%	389	2.77%
2016	5,007	34.18%	7,541	51.48%	2,101	14.34%
2020	6,187	36.13%	10,304	60.18%	631	3.69%
2024	6,683	37.82%	10,220	57.83%	769	4.35%

== Education ==
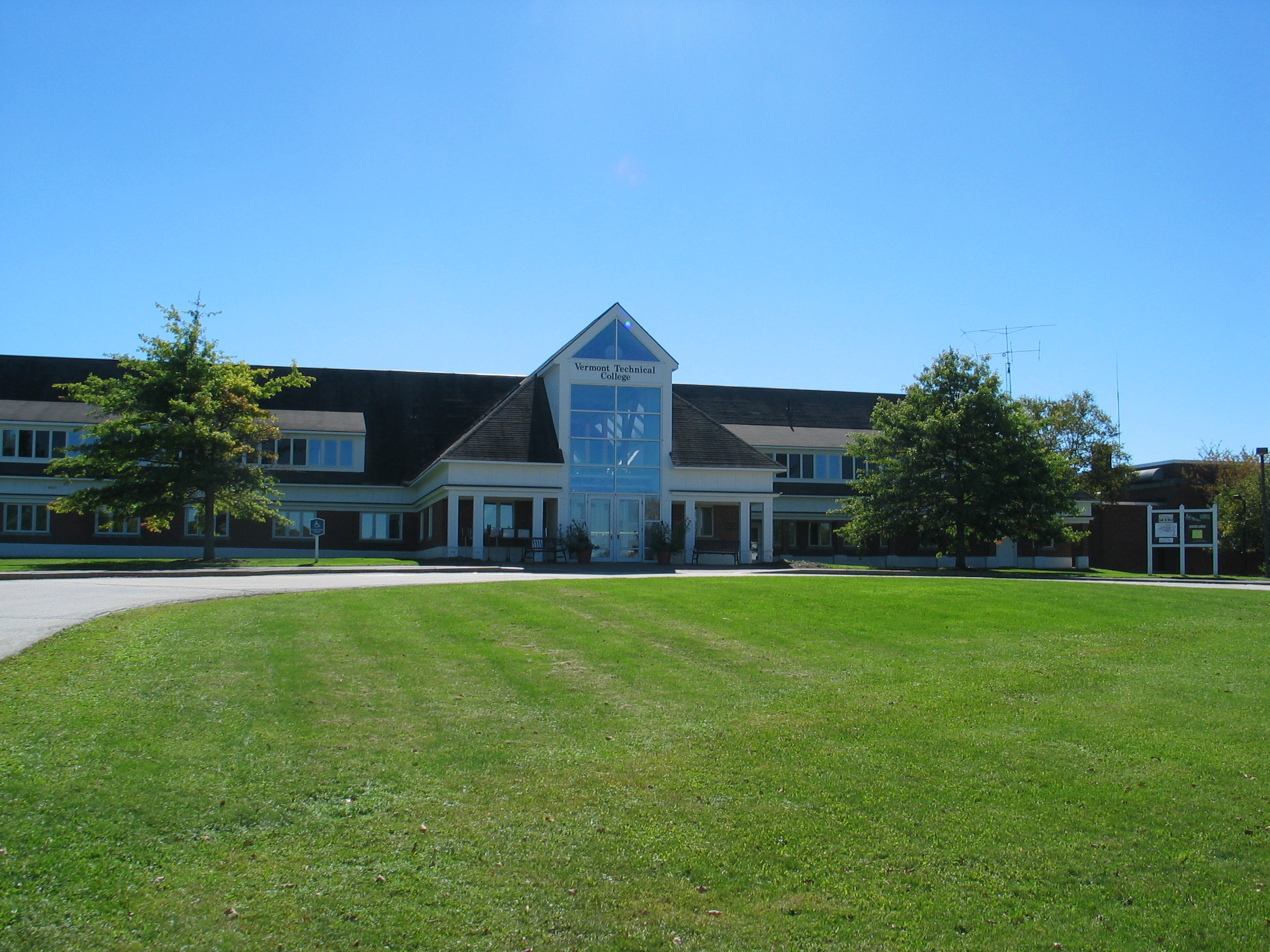
Vermont State University Randolph, known as Vermont Technical College until July 2023, has its campus in the village of Randolph Center.

The county is served by four school districts (supervisory unions):

- Orange East Supervisory Union
- Orange North Supervisory Union
- Orange Southwest Supervisory Union
- Orange Windsor Supervisory Union

Additionally, Fairlee, Vershire, and West Fairlee are in the Rivendell Interstate School District.

The town of Randolph is also home to the campus of Vermont State University Randolph (which was known as Vermont Technical College, or Vermont Tech, until July 2023).

== Recreation ==
Allis State Park is located in the town of Brookfield, and features a hiking trail, picnic pavilion, fire tower, and small campground.

== Communities ==
=== Towns ===
- Bradford
- Braintree
- Brookfield
- Chelsea (shire town, centrally located in the county)
- Corinth
- Fairlee
- Newbury
- Orange
- Randolph (Orange County's most populous town)
- Strafford
- Thetford
- Topsham
- Tunbridge
- Vershire
- Washington
- West Fairlee
- Williamstown

=== Villages ===
- Newbury
- West Newbury
- Wells River
- Union Village

=== Census-designated places ===
- Bradford
- Chelsea
- Fairlee
- Randolph
- Williamstown

=== Unincorporated community ===
- Post Mills

== See also ==
- National Register of Historic Places listings in Orange County, Vermont
- Alexander Kennedy Miller
