= Bradford (CDP), Vermont =

Census-designated place in Vermont, United States

Bradford, Vermont
- Census-designated place
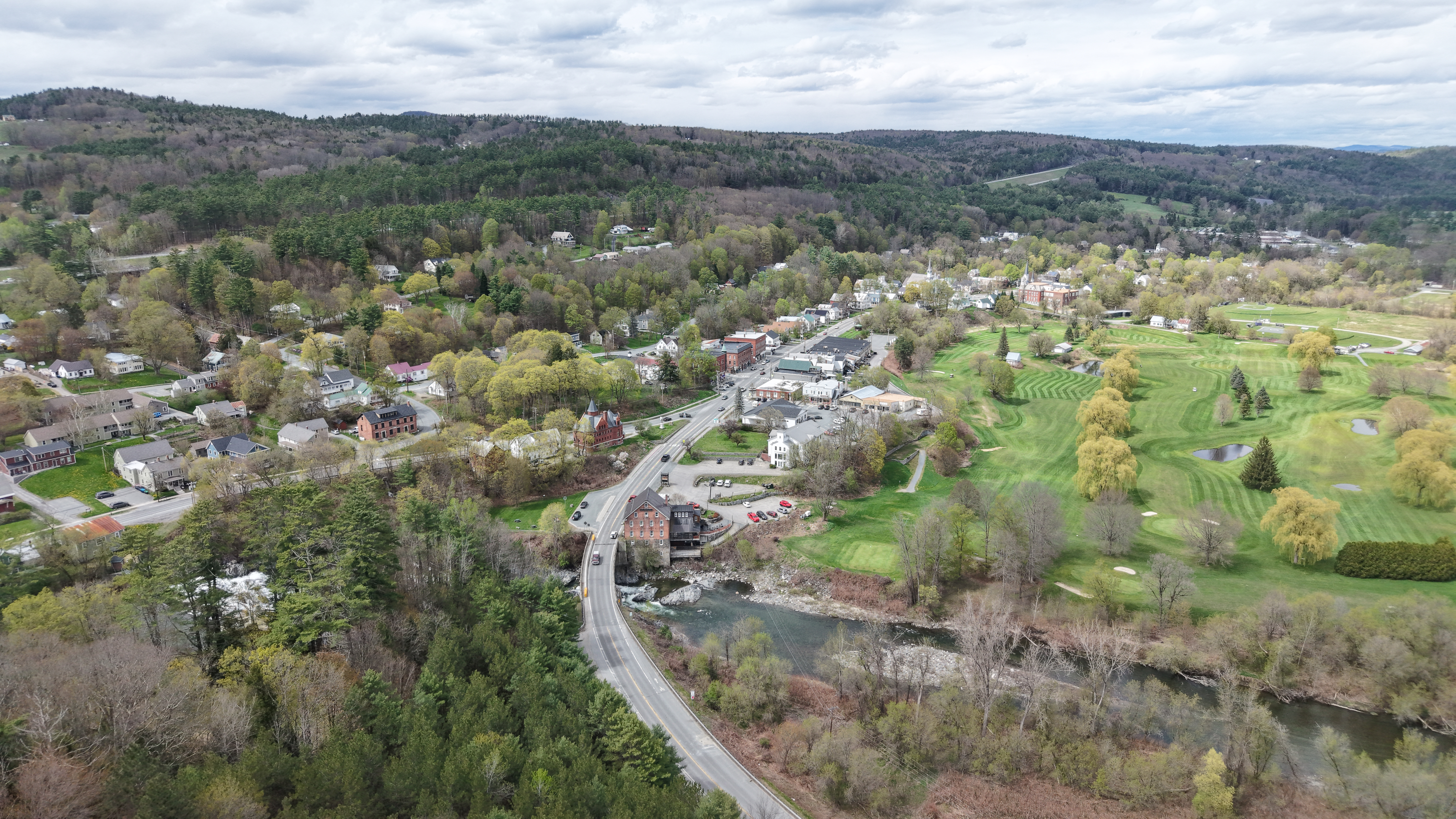
- Bradford, Vermont, from the southeast

- Location within the state of Vermont Bradford (the United States)
- Coordinates: 43°59′34″N 72°07′26″W
- Country: United States
- State: Vermont
- County: Orange
- Town: Bradford

Area
  - Total: 0.50 sq mi (1.3 km^{2})
  - Land: 0.50 sq mi (1.3 km^{2})
  - Water: 0 sq mi (0.0 km^{2})
- Elevation: 394 ft (120 m)

Population (2020)
  - Total: 907
  - Density: 1,800/sq mi (700/km^{2})
- Time zone: UTC-5 (Eastern (EST))
  - Summer (DST): UTC-4 (EDT)
- ZIP code: 05033
- Area code: 802
- FIPS code: 50-07225
- GNIS feature ID: 2378121

Bradford is a census-designated place in the town of Bradford, Orange County, Vermont, United States. The population was 907 at the 2020 census. The village disincorporated on December 1, 2004. The village became a census-designated place in 2008. The central commercial and residential portion of the village is listed on the National Register of Historic Places as the Bradford Village Historic District.

== History ==
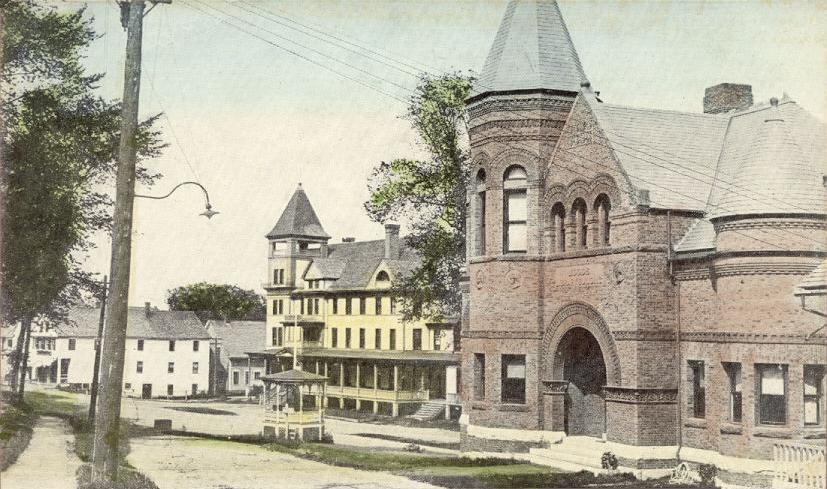
Woods Library and Hotel Low, c. 1915 postcard view

Bradford was established in the early 19th century, the steep drop of the Waits River recognized as a source of water power for industrial use. Asa Low spearheaded the development of that industry, building a brick grist mill in 1847. The village saw continued prosperity through the 19th century. The historic district designated in 1975 comprises 81 commercial, public, and religious buildings showcasing architectural styles from Federal and Greek Revival to Italianate and Romanesque. It includes the commercial business district of the village, the former industrial area near the Waits River, and adjacent residential areas.

=== Historic buildings ===
Some of Bradford's more significant historic buildings include:

- Former Boston and Maine Railroad depot (Depot Street), 1890
- Methodist Church (North Main Street), 1849
- Woods School Building or Bradford Academy (North Main Street), 1893–94
- Old Church (North Main Street), 1793–95
- Former Bliss Hotel (North Main Street), 1806
- Former Grist Mill (U.S. Route 5), 1847
- Woods Library Building (South Main Street), 1894–95
- Former Waitsville Fire House (South Main Street), 1871

== Geography ==
According to the United States Census Bureau, the village had a total area of 0.5 square mile (1.3 km^{2}), all land. The Waits River flows through the village.

== Demographics ==
As of the census of 2000, there were 815 people, 322 households, and 191 families residing in the village. The population density was 1,633.1 people per square mile (629.3/km^{2}). There were 372 housing units at an average density of 745.4/sq mi (287.3/km^{2}). The racial makeup of the village was 97.42% White, 0.86% Black or African American, 0.37% Native American, 0.49% Asian, and 0.86% from two or more races. Hispanic or Latino of any race were 0.74% of the population.

There were 322 households, out of which 30.4% had children under the age of 18 living with them, 42.2% were married couples living together, 16.1% had a female householder with no husband present, and 40.4% were non-families. 31.1% of all households were made up of individuals, and 14.6% had someone living alone who was 65 years of age or older. The average household size was 2.32 and the average family size was 2.95.

In the village the population was spread out, with 24.2% under the age of 18, 9.4% from 18 to 24, 23.3% from 25 to 44, 21.2% from 45 to 64, and 21.8% who were 65 years of age or older. The median age was 41 years. For every 100 females, there were 79.1 males. For every 100 females age 18 and over, there were 73.1 males.

The median income for a household in the village was $28,472, and the median income for a family was $32,031. Males had a median income of $30,673 versus $28,375 for females. The per capita income for the village was $14,456. About 10.1% of families and 16.6% of the population were below the poverty line, including 25.2% of those under age 18 and 7.7% of those age 65 or over.

== See also ==
- National Register of Historic Places listings in Orange County, Vermont
