= Topsham, Vermont =

- Town
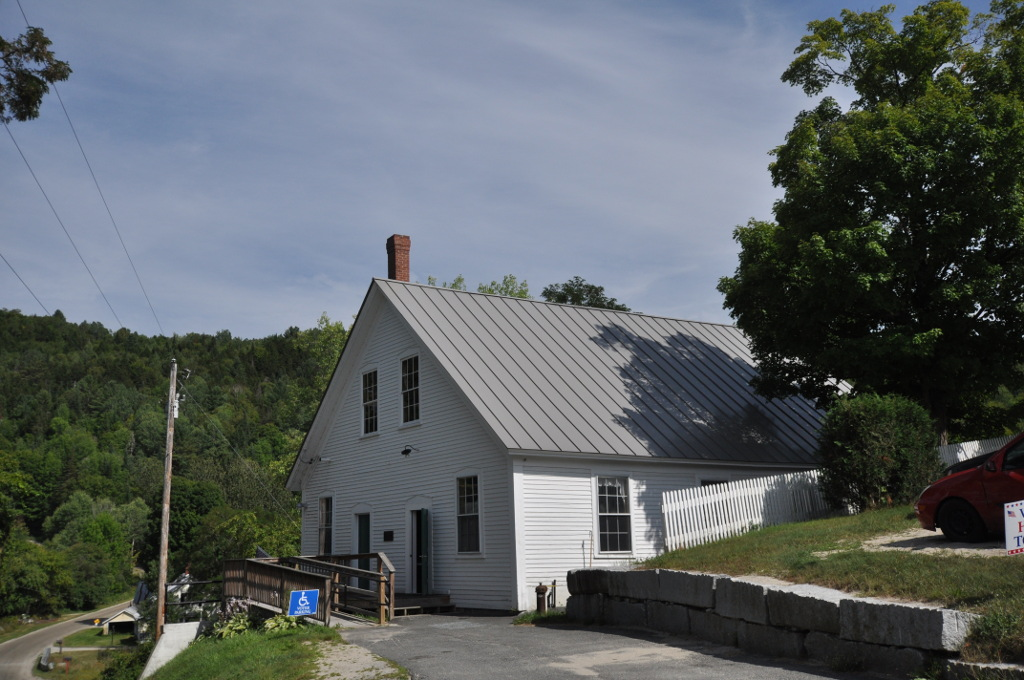
- Town hall, East Topsham village

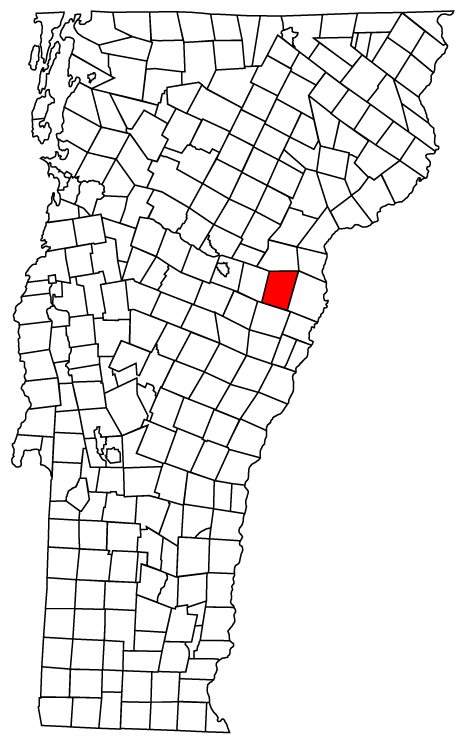
- Topsham, Vermont
- Coordinates: 44°07′14″N 72°15′54″W
- Country: United States
- State: Vermont
- County: Orange
- Communities: East Topsham; Topsham Four Corners; Waits River; West Topsham

Area
  - Total: 49.0 sq mi (126.9 km^{2})
  - Land: 48.9 sq mi (126.7 km^{2})
  - Water: 0.039 sq mi (0.1 km^{2})
- Elevation: 1,575 ft (480 m)

Population (2020)
  - Total: 1,199
  - Density: 25/sq mi (9.5/km^{2})
- Time zone: UTC-5 (Eastern (EST))
  - Summer (DST): UTC-4 (EDT)
- ZIP Codes: 05076 (Topsham); 05086 (West Topsham); 05040 (East Corinth)
- Area code: 802
- FIPS code: 50-73075
- GNIS feature ID: 1462228
- Website: townoftopshamvt.org

Topsham /ˈtɒpsəm/ is a town in Orange County, Vermont, United States. The population was 1,199 at the 2020 census. It contains four villages: East Topsham, Topsham Four Corners, Waits River, and West Topsham.

== Geography ==
According to the United States Census Bureau, the town has a total area of 49.0 square miles (126.9 km^{2}), of which 48.9 square miles (126.7 km^{2}) is land and 0.1 square mile (0.1 km^{2}) (0.10%) is water. The Waits River flows through the western part of Topsham. The town is on top of the Waits River Formation, a Silurian-Devonian limestone.

== Demographics ==
Historical population
Census	Pop.	Note	%±
1790	162		—
1800	344		112.3%
1810	814		136.6%
1820	1,020		25.3%
1830	1,384		35.7%
1840	1,745		26.1%
1850	1,668		−4.4%
1860	1,662		−0.4%
1870	1,418		−14.7%
1880	1,365		−3.7%
1890	1,187		−13.0%
1900	1,117		−5.9%
1910	918		−17.8%
1920	825		−10.1%
1930	720		−12.7%
1940	707		−1.8%
1950	733		3.7%
1960	638		−13.0%
1970	686		7.5%
1980	767		11.8%
1990	944		23.1%
2000	1,142		21.0%
2010	1,173		2.7%
2020	1,199		2.2%
U.S. Decennial Census

As of the census of 2000, there were 1,142 people, 421 households, and 324 families residing in the town. The population density was 23.3 people per square mile (9.0/km^{2}). There were 582 housing units at an average density of 11.9 per square mile (4.6/km^{2}). The racial makeup of the town was 98.69% White, 0.35% African American, 0.26% Native American, 0.61% Asian, and 0.09% from two or more races. Hispanic or Latino of any race were 0.53% of the population.

There were 421 households, out of which 38.2% had children under the age of 18 living with them, 63.7% were couples living together and joined in either marriage or civil union, 7.8% had a female householder with no husband present, and 23.0% were non-families. 16.9% of all households were made up of individuals, and 5.2% had someone living alone who was 65 years of age or older. The average household size was 2.71 and the average family size was 3.00.

In the town, the population was spread out, with 27.6% under the age of 18, 6.8% from 18 to 24, 32.3% from 25 to 44, 23.1% from 45 to 64, and 10.2% who were 65 years of age or older. The median age was 36 years. For every 100 females, there were 96.9 males. For every 100 females age 18 and over, there were 100.7 males.

The median income for a household in the town was $37,202, and the median income for a family was $37,440. Males had a median income of $27,708 versus $21,008 for females. The per capita income for the town was $15,405. About 9.3% of families and 12.8% of the population were below the poverty line, including 18.6% of those under age 18 and 8.8% of those age 65 or over.

== Notable people ==
- Jon Cone, developer of photographic ink jet technology
- George Augustus Gates, clergyman and college president
- F. J. Mills, Lieutenant governor of Idaho
- William Nutt, Massachusetts legislator and banker
- James Hamilton Peabody, Colorado governor
- Charles Ross Taggart, folklorist and musician
