= Pocumtuck Range =

Mountain range in Massachusetts, US

- Metacomet Ridge
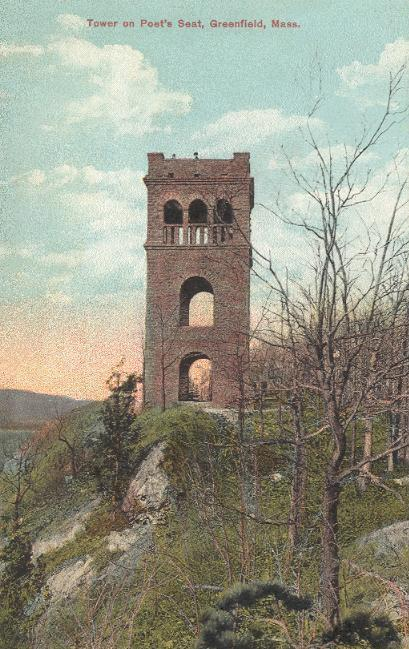
- Poet's Seat Tower on Rocky Mountain, northern Pocumtuck Range. 1915 postcard.

Highest point
- Peak: Pocumtuck Rock
- Elevation: 846 ft (258 m)
- Coordinates: 42°32′00″N 72°35′30″W

Dimensions
- Length: 11 mi (18 km) east-west

Geography
- Location within Massachusetts
- Country: United States
- State: Massachusetts

Geology
- Rock ages: Triassic and Jurassic
- Rock types: fault-block, igneous and sedimentary

The Pocumtuck Range, also referred to as the Pocumtuck Ridge, is the northernmost subrange of the Metacomet Ridge mountain range of southern New England, itself a subrange of the Appalachian Mountains. Located in Franklin County, Massachusetts, between the Connecticut River and the Deerfield River valleys, the Pocumtuck Range is a popular hiking destination known for its continuous high cliffs, scenic vistas, and microclimate ecosystems.

== Geography ==
The range, 11 miles (18 km) long by 1.75 miles (2.8 km) wide at its widest point, includes, from south to north, Sugarloaf Mountain of Deerfield; a central high ridge most often called Pocumtuck Ridge; and Rocky Mountain (sometimes called Greenfield Ridge) of Greenfield. Notable peaks include, from south to north:

- South Sugarloaf Mountain, 652 feet (199 m), a butte-like peak at the south end of the Pocumtuck Range, well known for its historic summit automobile road and abrupt butte-like cliffs overlooking the Connecticut River valley south.
- North Sugarloaf Mountain, 791 feet (241 m), looms above South Sugarloaf with ledges facing south and west.
- Pocumtuck Rock, 846 feet (258 m), the sandstone high point on the 2-mile (3 km) long cliffs of the Pocumtuck Ridge which rise 500 feet (150 m) above Interstate 91 and the rural Deerfield River Valley to the west.
- Trap Rock Ledge, 452 feet (138 m), a trap rock overlook on the east side of Pocumtuck Ridge.
- Sachem Head, 452 feet (138 m), a popular, exposed overlook at the south end of Rocky Mountain.
- Poet's Seat Tower, 492 feet (150 m), high point of Rocky Mountain, overlooking Greenfield.
- Canada Hill, 338 feet (103 m), the steep northern prominence of Rocky Mountain at the confluence of the Connecticut River and Falls River, prominent from both Greenfield and from the Connecticut River mill village of Turner's Falls, Massachusetts to the east.

The Deerfield River cuts between Rocky Mountain and Pocumtuck Ridge just before merging with the Connecticut River.

The Pocumtuck Range is located entirely in Deerfield and Greenfield. The Metacomet Ridge, of which it is a part, continues north as a series of low sedimentary hills and dwindling trap rock outcrops to just two miles south of the Vermont and New Hampshire borders in Northfield, Massachusetts. South of Sugarloaf Mountain, the Metacomet Ridge virtually disappears into low, scattered rises and flat plains of sedimentary rock before ascending again as the prominent trap rock Holyoke and Mount Tom Ranges nine miles south.

== Origin of the name ==
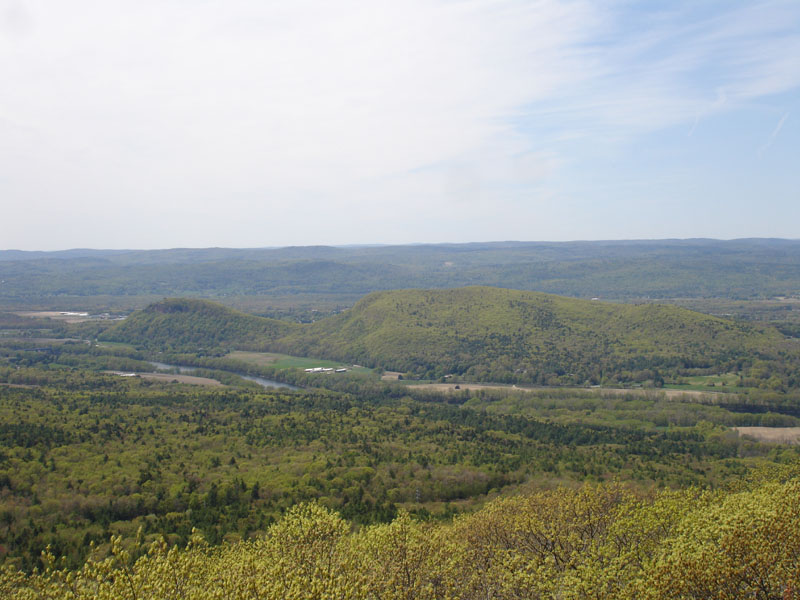
According to native belief, South Sugarloaf (left) and North Sugarloaf-Pocumtuck Ridge (right) are the head and body of a giant beaver killed by the spirit Hobomock

Pocumtuck (Pocumtuc) was the name of a now extinct tribe of Native Americans who lived in the area prior to 1800. According to stories ascribed to the tribe, Pocumtuck Ridge and Sugarloaf Mountain were the remains of a giant beaver killed by the giant spirit Hobomock (the same spirit who diverted the course of the Connecticut River in central Connecticut and was cursed to sleep forever as the Sleeping Giant mountain formation). The Pocumtucks allegedly believed that the beaver lived in an enormous lake that once occupied the Connecticut River Valley:

The Great Beaver, whose pond flowed over the whole basin of Mt. Tom, made havoc among the fish and when these failed he would come ashore and devour Indians. A pow-wow was held and Hobomock raised, who came to their relief. With a great stake in hand, he waded the river until he found the beaver, and so hotly chased him that he sought to escape by digging into the ground. Hobomock saw his plan and his whereabouts, and with his great stake jammed the beaver's head off. The earth over the beaver's head we call Sugarloaf, his body [Pocumtuck Ridge] lies just to the north of it.

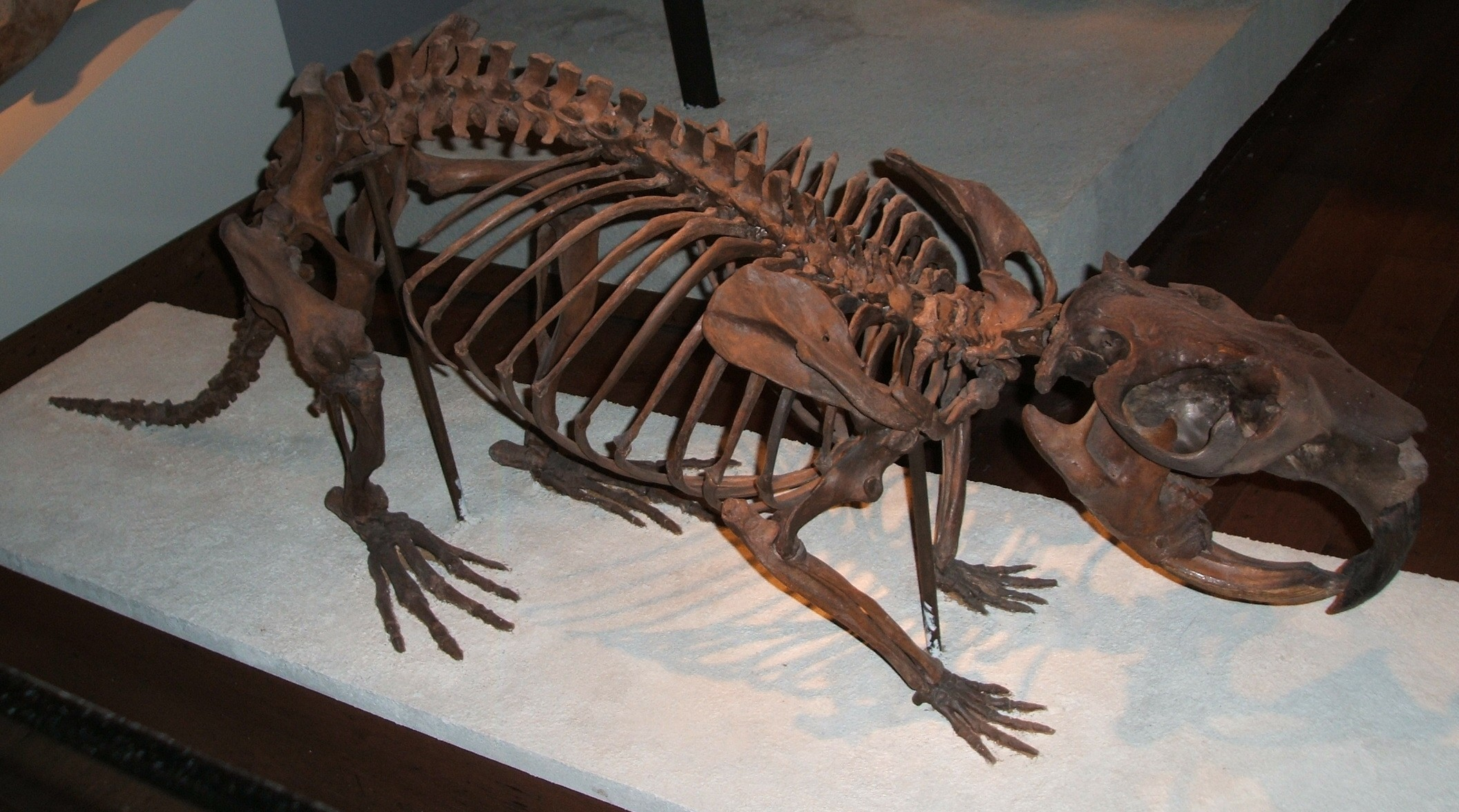
Castoroides ohioensis

A number of different versions of this story exist, all of them similar. There may be some scientific truth to the account. The lake described in the tale is very reminiscent of the post-glacial Lake Hitchcock which occupied the Connecticut River Valley from Burke, Vermont to New Britain, Connecticut 15,000 years ago. Around this time, a giant beaver species (Castoroides ohioensis) thrived from the post-glacial front to as far south as Florida. The animals were as large as black bears, weighed up to 450 lbs., and had teeth the size of bananas. A similar legend about the killing of a giant beaver by a helper-spirit and the subsequent transformation of the corpse into a landform occurs among the native Mi'kmaq people of Nova Scotia (see Glooscap).

== Geology and ecosystem ==
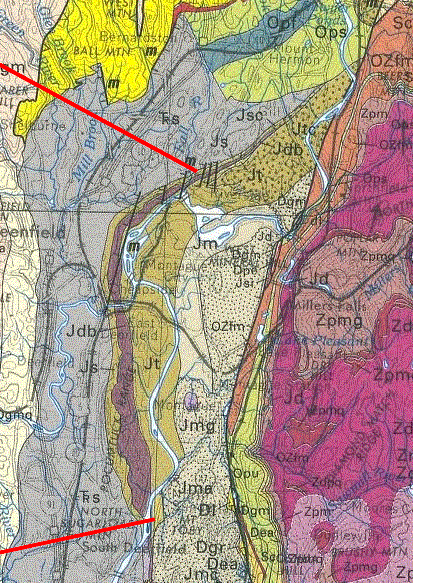
Bedrock geology of the Pocumtuck Range. Purple=trap rock; brown and blue-grey=arkose sandstone; beige (righthand only)=conglomerate. Red arrows indicate extent of range. South Sugarloaf Mountain, arkose, is located just below the lower arrow.

The Pocumtuck Range is composed of Sugarloaf arkose, a weather resistant sedimentary rock capped in places by a thin ridge of volcanic trap rock. The arkose is most apparent on Sugarloaf Mountain and the western cliff of Pocumtuck Ridge, while the trap rock is most apparent on the north and east side of Pocumtuck Ridge and throughout the summit ridge of Rocky Mountain in Greenfield. The range is a non-contiguous extension of the Metacomet Ridge that extends through New England from Long Island Sound to the Vermont border. The Pocumtuck Range forms the bottom and middle layers of a geologic layercake. The arkose is the oldest (bottom) layer, followed by the middle trap rock layer, which in turn gives way to a conglomerate rock top layer most visible across the Connecticut River as Mount Toby. These layers were formed between 190 and 210 million years ago as the continent of North America began rifting apart from Africa and Eurasia. A series of erosion and deposition (geology) episodes interspersed with heavy basalt lava flows created the layered strata; faulting and earthquakes tilted the layers diagonally while subsequent erosion and glacial activity exposed the tilted "layers" of sandstone, basalt, and erosion-resistant conglomerate rock visible today.

The Pocumtuck Range hosts a combination of microclimate ecosystems unusual to the region. Eastern red cedar, a dry-loving species, clings to the barren edges of cliffs. Backslope plant communities tend to be similar to the adjacent upland plateaus and nearby Berkshires, containing species common to the northern hardwood and oak-hickory forest ecosystem types. Eastern hemlock crowds narrow ravines, blocking sunlight and creating damp, cooler growing conditions with associated cooler climate plant species. Talus slopes are especially rich in nutrients and support a number of calcium-loving plants uncommon in the region. Miles of cliffs make ideal raptor habitat, and the range is an important seasonal raptor migration corridor. Thirty-seven species of fern can be found on the range, making it one of the richest ecosystems of fern diversity in the Commonwealth of Massachusetts. The range also supports extensive populations of whorled pogonia, a plant on the Massachusetts Environmental Protection Agency's watch list.

The Massachusetts Audubon Society considers the Rocky Mountain section of Pocumtuck Ridge "exceptionally rich in its diversity of [bird] species, especially during migration. . .an important area for breeding birds, and wintering individuals."

== Recreation and Conservation ==
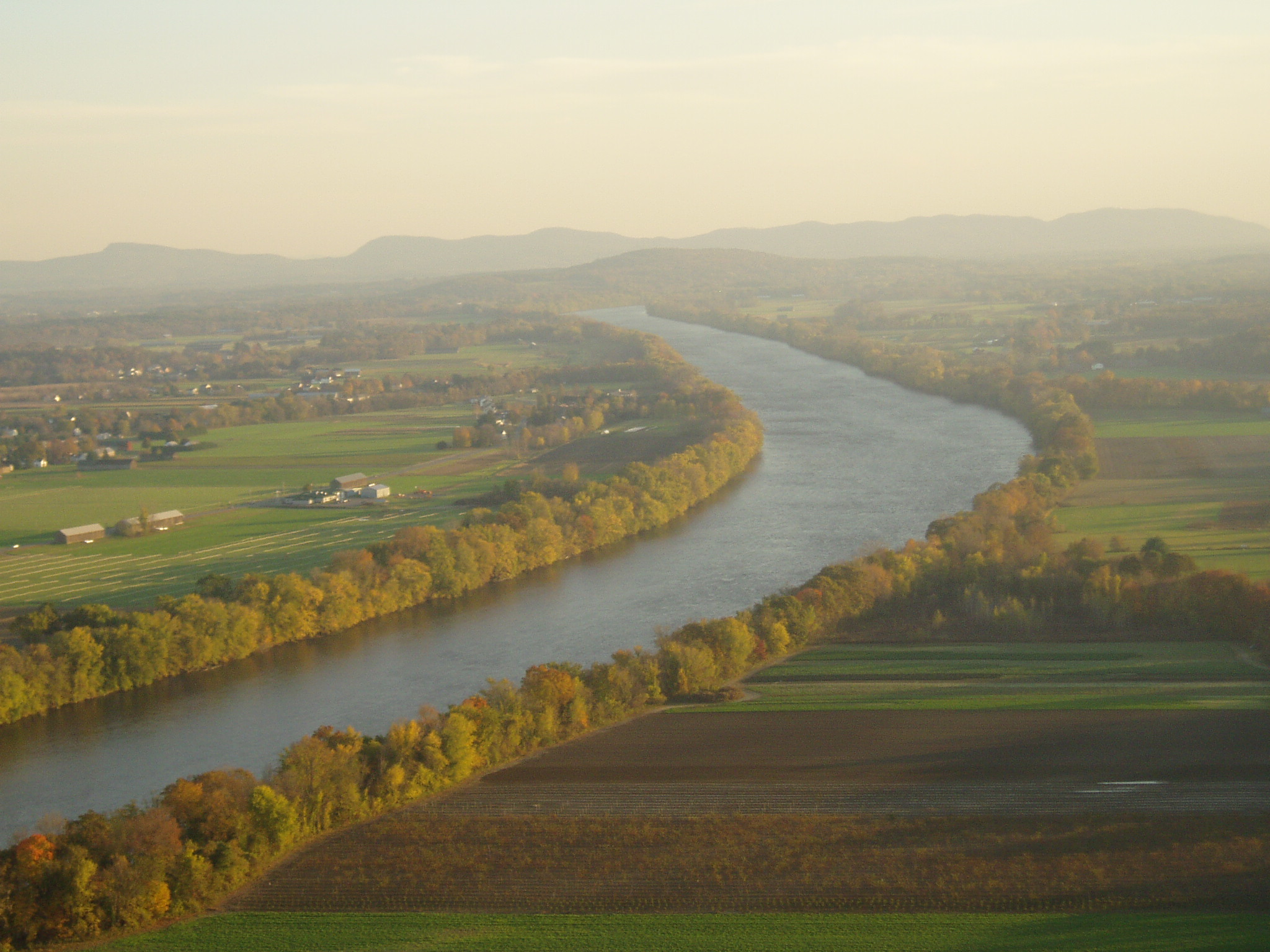
View of the Connecticut River from South Sugarloaf summit

Activities enjoyed on the Pocumtuck Range include hiking, mountain biking, snowshoeing, backcountry skiing, hunting (in season), picnicking, and bird watching.

Seventy percent of the ridgeline route traversed by the 20-mile (32 km) Pocumtuck Ridge Trail has been conserved as state, municipal, or non profit holdings, or as private land under conservation easement. The rest of the ridgeline, and much of the slopes of the mountain, remain in the private domain. The trail begins on South Sugarloaf and traverses the ridge to Poet's Seat.

A network of smaller marked and unmarked trails also crisscross the range. Sugarloaf Mountain, at the southern end of the range, is managed as the Mount Sugarloaf State Reservation, with an observation tower and automobile toll road, open in season. Several trails climb to the summits. Poet's Seat and the adjacent parklands on Rocky Mountain are managed by the City of Greenfield. Poet's Seat Tower Park features a 1912 sandstone observation tower named in honor of local poet Frederick Goddard Tuckerman. The annual Fourth of July fireworks celebration takes place at Poet's Seat. The tower is open seasonally via a quarter-mile walk from a ridgetop trailhead or via auto road (in season). An observation platform at the abrupt ledge of Sachem Head is accessible via the same trailhead. Eaglebrook School, a boarding school for boys grades six to nine, runs the chairlift-served Easton Ski Area on the west side of Pocumtuck Ridge (closed to the public). A defunct Eaglebrook ski area is located to the north. Another defunct ski area, once operated by Deerfield Academy, is located on the east side of the ridge.

The Pocumtuck Range is most threatened by development and quarrying. The Massachusetts Department of Conservation and Recreation and several local conservation non-profits have made conservation of the range a priority.

== See also ==
- Metacomet Ridge
- Pocumtuck Ridge Trail
- List of subranges of the Appalachian Mountains
- Nearby summits:

↓ South

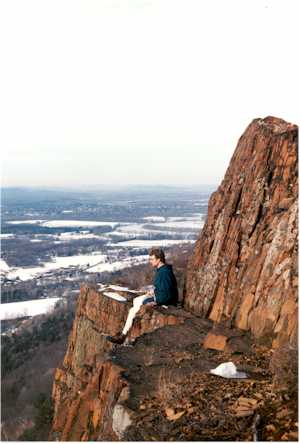
Mount Tom Range

South ↓

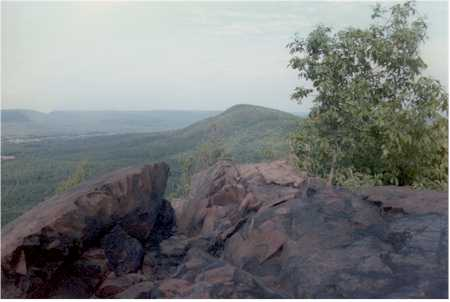
Holyoke Range

East >

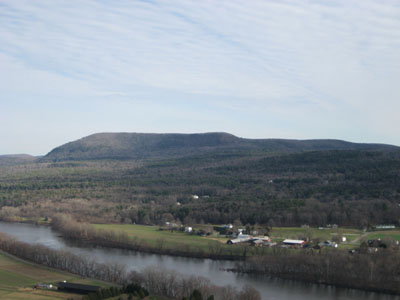
Mount Toby
