= Early modern Europe =

European history from mid-1400s to late 1700s

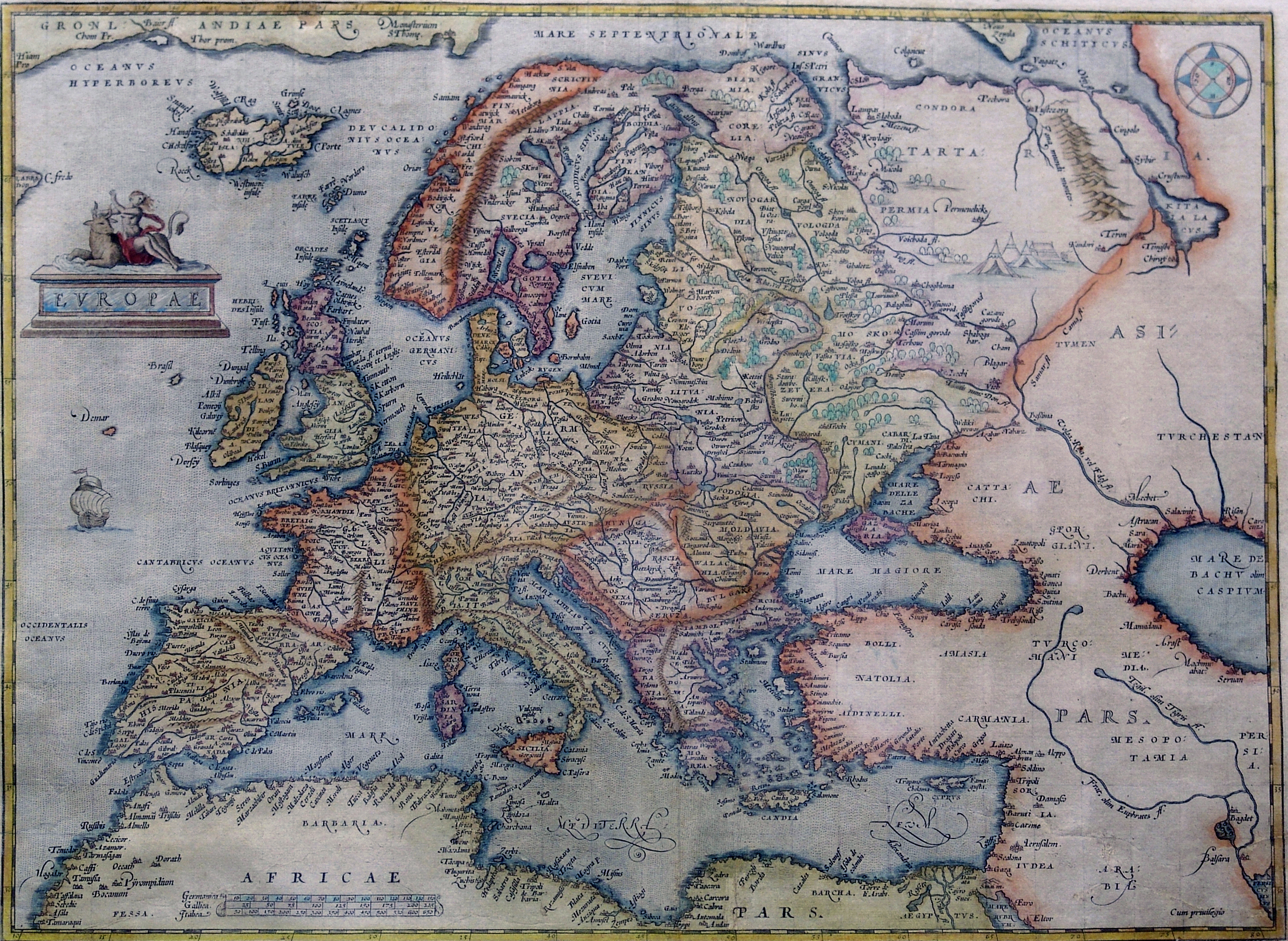
Abraham Ortelius: Map of Europe, 1595

Early modern Europe, also referred to as the post-medieval period, is the period of European history between the end of the Middle Ages and the beginning of the Industrial Revolution, roughly the mid 15th century to the late 18th century. Historians variously mark the beginning of the period with the invention of moveable type printing in the 1450s, the fall of Constantinople and end of the Hundred Years' War in 1453, the end of the Wars of the Roses in 1485, the beginning of the High Renaissance in Italy in the 1490s, the end of the Reconquista and subsequent voyages of Christopher Columbus to the Americas in 1492, or the start of the Protestant Reformation in 1517. The precise dates of its end point also vary and are usually linked with either the start of the French Revolution in 1789 or with the more vaguely defined beginning of the Industrial Revolution in late 18th century England.

Some of the more notable trends and events of the early modern period included the first circumnavigation of the Earth, the establishment of regular European contact with the Americas and South and East Asia and the European colonization of the Americas. The Protestant Reformation and the religious conflicts it provoked (including the French Wars of Religion and the Thirty Years' War), greatly altered the religious balance of Christendom, creating a formidable new opposition to the dominance of the Catholic Church, especially in Northern Europe.

Modern science emerged during the 17th century and was followed by increasingly rapid technological progress, as well as the establishment of secularized civic politics, law courts and the nation state. Capitalist economies began to develop in a nascent form, first in the Low Countries, and later in France, Germany and England. The period is often associated with the rise and dominance of the economic theory of mercantilism and the decline and eventual disappearance (at least in Western Europe) of feudalism and serfdom. The ensuing rise of global systems of international economic, cultural and intellectual exchange played an important role in the development of capitalism and represents an identifiable early phase of globalization. The five great powers of Europe that emerged by the end of the 18th century—Austria, France, Prussia, Russia, and the United Kingdom—formed the Concert of Europe that dominated European politics in the 19th century and up to World War I.

== Periodization ==
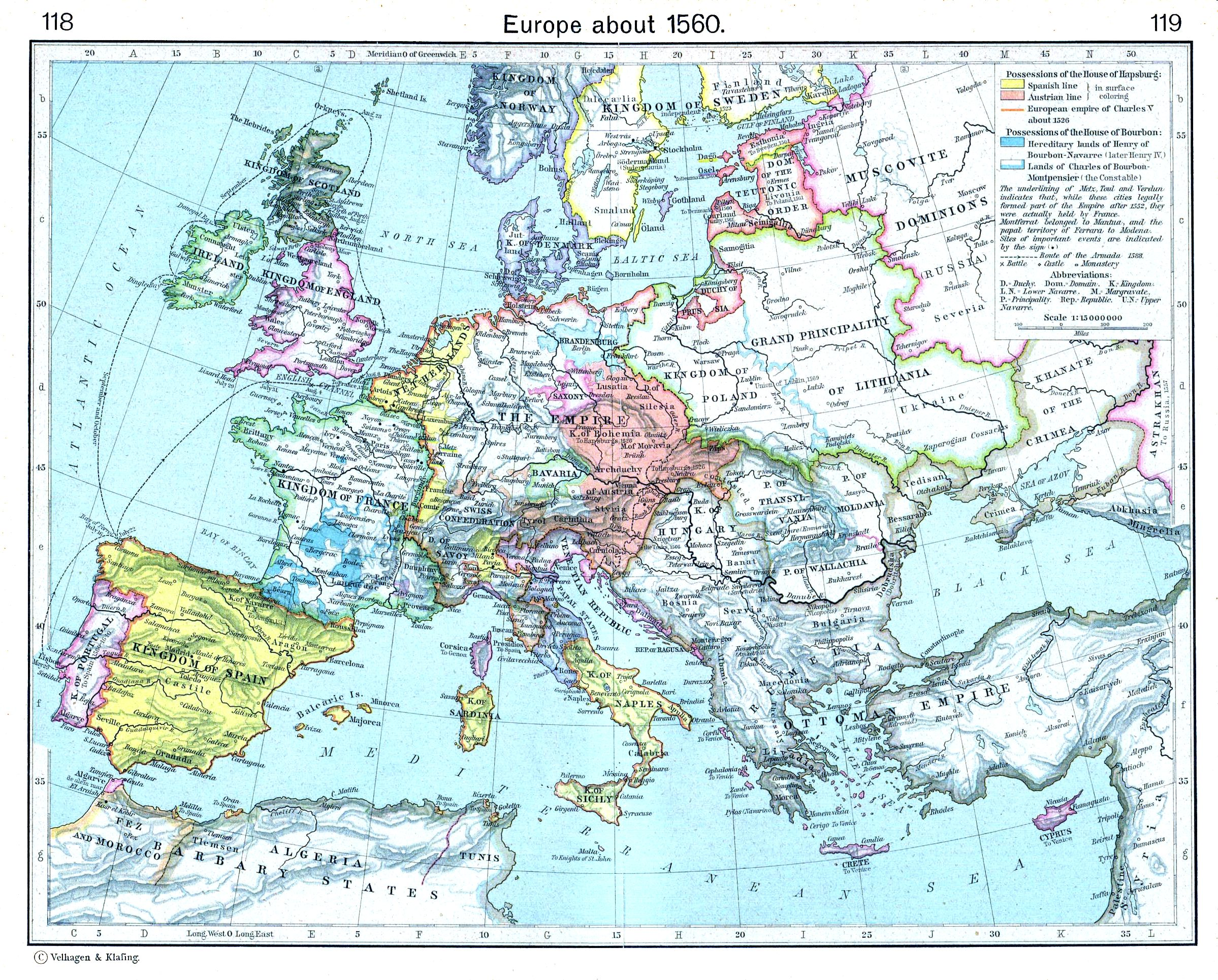
Europe about 1560, as in the 1923 William Shepherd Atlas

Regardless of the precise dates used to define its beginning and end points, the early modern period is generally agreed to have comprised the Renaissance, the Reformation, the Scientific Revolution, and the Enlightenment. As such, historians have attributed a number of fundamental changes to the period, notably the increasingly rapid progress of science and technology, the secularization of politics, and the diminution of the absolute authority of the Roman Catholic Church as well as the lessening of the influence of all faiths upon national governments. Many historians have identified the early modern period as the epoch in which individuals began to think of themselves as belonging to a national polity—a notable break from medieval modes of self-identification, which had been largely based upon religion (belonging to a universal Christendom), language, or feudal allegiance (belonging to the manor or extended household of a particular magnate or lord).

The beginning of the early modern period is not clear-cut, but is generally accepted to be in the late 15th century or early 16th century. Significant dates in this transitional phase from medieval to early modern Europe can be noted:

- 1450: The invention of the first European movable type printing process by Johannes Gutenberg, a device that fundamentally changed the circulation of information. Movable type, which allowed individual characters to be arranged to form words and which is an invention separate from the printing press, had been invented earlier in China.
- 1453: The conquest of Constantinople by the Ottomans signalled the end of the Byzantine Empire; the Battle of Castillon concluded the Hundred Years' War.
- 1485: The last Plantagenet king of England, Richard III, was killed at Bosworth and the medieval Wars of the Roses gave way to early modern Tudor monarchy, in the person of Henry VII.
- 1492: The first documented European voyage to the Americas by the Genoese explorer Christopher Columbus; the end of the Reconquista, with the final expulsion of the Moors from the Iberian Peninsula; the Spanish government expels the Jews.
- 1494: French king Charles VIII invaded Italy, drastically altering the status quo and beginning a series of wars which would punctuate the Italian Renaissance.
- 1503: Amerigo Vespucci's Mundus Novus letter is published.
- 1513: First formulation of modern politics with the publication of Machiavelli's The Prince.
- 1517: The Reformation begins with Martin Luther nailing his ninety-five theses to the door of the church in Wittenberg, Germany.
- 1526: Ferdinand I gains the crowns of Bohemia and Hungary.
- 1527: Sack of Rome by the mutinous troops of the Holy Roman Emperor Charles V.
- 1545: The Council of Trent begins Counter-Reformation and marks the end of the medieval Roman Catholic Church.

The end date of the early modern period is variously associated with the Industrial Revolution, which began in Britain in about 1750, or the beginning of the French Revolution in 1789, which drastically transformed the state of European politics and ushered in the Napoleonic era and modern Europe.

The role of nobles in the Feudal System had yielded to the notion of the Divine Right of Kings during the Middle Ages (in fact, this consolidation of power from the land-owning nobles to the titular monarchs was one of the most prominent themes of the Middle Ages). Among the most notable political changes included the abolition of serfdom and the crystallization of kingdoms into nation-states. Perhaps even more significantly, with the advent of the Reformation, the notion of Christendom as a unified political entity was destroyed. Many kings and rulers used this radical shift in the understanding of the world to further consolidate their sovereignty over their territories. For instance, many of the Germanic states (as well as English Reformation) converted to Protestantism in an attempt to slip out of the grasp of the Pope.

The intellectual developments of the period included the creation of the economic theory of mercantilism and the publication of enduringly influential works of political and social philosophy, such as Machiavelli's The Prince (1513) and Thomas More's Utopia (1515). In the 17th century, the Scientific Revolution was defined by the foundational works of Johannes Kepler's Astronomia Nova (1609), Galileo Galilei's Starry Messenger (1610) and Isaac Newton's Philosophiæ Naturalis Principia Mathematica (1687).

== Printing Revolution ==
The spread of printing between 1440 and 1500.

From a single print shop in the Free Imperial City of Mainz around 1440, printing had spread to about 270 cities across Europe and produced more than 20 million volumes by the end of the 15th century. Just 25 miles away, the Frankfurt Book Fair (Note: Like nearby Mainz, Frankfurt was a free imperial city of the Holy Roman Empire.) was established by 1462 and remained the primary marketplace for printers and publishers and the center of Europe's book trade for the next two hundred years. By the 16th century, the manuscript culture of the Middle Ages, where facts were few and far between, had begun to give way to a printing culture where living scholars could compare their own observations with those of other (living) scholars, transforming how knowledge was created, preserved and disseminated.

== Age of Discovery ==
The Age of Discovery was a period from approximately the 15th to the 17th century, during which seafarers from European countries explored, colonized, and conquered regions across the globe. The opening of maritime routes to the East Indies and European colonization of the Americas by the Spaniards and Portuguese, later joined by the English, French, and Dutch, spurred international global trade that connected previously isolated parts of the world to each other. The interconnected global economy of the 21st century has its origins in the expansion of trade networks during this era.

Universalis Cosmographia, Waldseemüller's 1507 world map, which was the first to show the Americas separate from Asia

Amerigo Vespucci's Mundus Novus letter, published in 1503 and repeatedly reprinted, provided the first explicit articulation in print that the lands discovered by European navigators to the West were not the edges of Asia, but rather an entirely different continent (a "New World"). Between 1519 and 1522, the Magellan–Elcano expedition achieved the first circumnavigation of Earth in history, including the first crossing of the Pacific by a European expedition, revealing the vast scale of that ocean. Every continent was visited and mostly mapped by Europeans, except the south polar continent now known as Antarctica. The continents drawn by European mapmakers developed from abstract "blobs" into the outlines more recognizable to us. The discovery of continents that were completely unknown to the ancients had a profound impact on European intellectual life in the 16th century. By revealing a "New World" unknown to the ancients, the European encounter with the Americas also specifically undermined the authority of Claudius Ptolemy, the 2nd-century scholar whose geographic and astronomical models had long been considered infallible.

European exploration also initiated the Columbian exchange between the Old World (Europe, Asia, and Africa) and New World (Americas). This exchange involved the transfer of plants, animals, human populations (including slaves), communicable diseases, and culture across the Eastern and Western Hemispheres. Epidemics of smallpox and other Eurasian diseases swept the Americas subsequent to European contact, killing between 10 million and 100 million people, up to 95% of the indigenous population of the Americas. The diffusion of New World crops reshaped Europe. Maize arrived first and spread swiftly through the Mediterranean and Balkans in the 16th century while the potato spread far more slowly in northern Europe. (Note: Potatoes yielded about three times the calories per acre of wheat or barley, mainly because it took only 3–4 months to mature versus 10 months for wheat. On top of this, potatoes had higher nutritive value than wheat, could be grown in even fallow and nutrient-poor soil, did not require any special tools, and were considered fairly appetising. A single acre of potatoes could feed a family of five or six, plus a cow, for the better part of a year, an unprecedented level of production. By 1715 the potato was widespread in the Low Countries, the Rhineland, southwestern Germany, and eastern France, but took longer to spread elsewhere.) The higher and more reliable caloric yield per acre of both crops altered the peasant diet and contributed to the retreat of recurrent famine (Note: The European potato failure of the mid-1840s was a significant exception. Northern and Western Europe suffered significant excess mortality, with the highest casualty rates occurring in the Scottish Highlands and Ireland via the Highland Potato Famine and Great Famine respectively. Mass emigration occurred as a result.) and to European population growth and urbanization. The era saw widespread enslavement, exploitation and military conquest of Indigenous peoples, concurrent with the growing economic influence and spread of Western culture, science and technology leading to a faster-than-exponential population growth world-wide.

== Reformation ==
The Protestant Reformation was a reform-oriented schism from the Roman Catholic Church initiated by Martin Luther and continued by John Calvin, Huldrych Zwingli, and other early Protestant Reformers. It is typically dated from 1517 - when Luther posted his 95 Theses criticizing the practice of indulgences to the door of the Castle Church in Wittenberg, Germany - to the Peace of Westphalia, which ended the Thirty Years' War (1618–1648). The four most important traditions to emerge directly from the Reformation were Lutheranism, the Reformed (also called Calvinist or Presbyterian) tradition, Anglicanism, and the Anabaptists. Subsequent Protestant churches generally trace their roots back to these initial four schools of the Reformation. The Radical Reformation also gave rise to the Anabaptist, Moravian and other Pietistic movements. The core motivation behind the Reformation was theological, though many other factors played a part, including the rise of nationalism, the Western Schism that eroded faith in the Papacy, the perceived corruption of the Roman Curia, the impact of humanism, and the new learning of the Renaissance that questioned much traditional thought.

Henry VIII broke England's ties with the Catholic Church, becoming the sole head of the English Church.

The Reformation reshaped the Church of England decisively after 1547. The separation of the Church of England (or Anglican Church) from Rome under Henry VIII, beginning in 1529 and completed in 1537, brought England alongside this broad Reformation movement; however, religious changes in the English national church proceeded more conservatively than elsewhere in Europe. Reformers in the Church of England alternated, for decades, between sympathies for ancient Catholic tradition and more Reformed principles, gradually developing, within the context of robustly Protestant doctrine, a tradition considered a middle way (via media) between the Roman Catholic and Protestant traditions.

The Roman Catholic Church responded with a Counter-Reformation initiated by the Council of Trent (1545-1563), which included a variety of new spiritual movements, reforms of religious communities, the founding of seminaries, the clarification of Catholic theology as well as structural changes in the institution of the Church. Much work in battling Protestantism was done by the well-organised new order of the Jesuits. In general, Northern Europe, with the exception of most of Ireland, came under the influence of Protestantism. Southern Europe remained Roman Catholic, while Central Europe was a site of a fierce conflict, culminating in the Thirty Years' War, which left it devastated.

Margaret C. Jacob argues that there has been a dramatic shift in the historiography of the Reformation. Until the 1960s, historians focused their attention largely on the great leaders and also the theologians of the 16th century, especially Luther, Calvin, and Zwingli. Their ideas were studied in depth. However, the rise of the new social history in the 1960s look at history from the bottom up, not from the top down. Historians began to concentrate on the values, beliefs and behavior of the people at large. She finds, "in contemporary scholarship, the Reformation was then seen as a vast cultural upheaval, a social and popular movement and textured and rich because of its diversity."

== Scientific Revolution ==
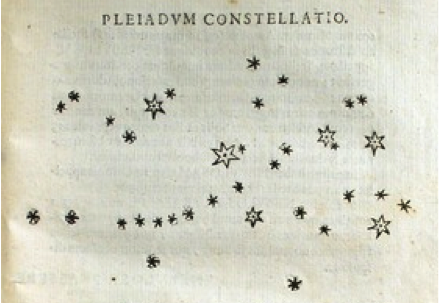
Galileo reported in the Starry Messenger (1610) that he saw at least ten times more stars through the telescope than are visible to the naked eye.

Italian astronomer Galileo Galilei’s (1564–1642) early 17th-century telescopic observations began the transformation of what had been a narrowly technical revision of classical astronomy into an increasingly aggressive challenge to traditional cosmology and its long-standing synthesis with Christian theology. (Note: In Aristotle's cosmology, Earth was the realm of imperfection, inconstancy, irregularity, and change while the heavens (Moon, Sun, planets, stars) were perfect, permanent, unchangeable and, in religious thought, the realm of heavenly beings.) English mathematical physicist Isaac Newton’s (1643–1727) Philosophiæ Naturalis Principia Mathematica (1687) dissolved the ancient boundary between the celestial and the terrestrial by showing how a single mathematical law - the law of universal gravitation - ruled both realms, the first great unification of physics.

The upheaval of the Scientific Revolution ended the medieval view of natural philosophy as the servant (or "handmaiden") of theology. As natural philosophy continued to grow in power, self-confidence and independence during the 17th century, the intellectual attitude of educated people shifted from fides quaerens intellectum toward a mode of understanding increasingly detached from religion. The "New Science" that emerged by the end of the century broke sharply with the natural philosophy that had preceded it, departed from previous Greek conceptions and traditions, was more mechanistic in its worldview and more integrated with mathematics, and was obsessed with the acquisition and interpretation of new evidence.

== Enlightenment ==
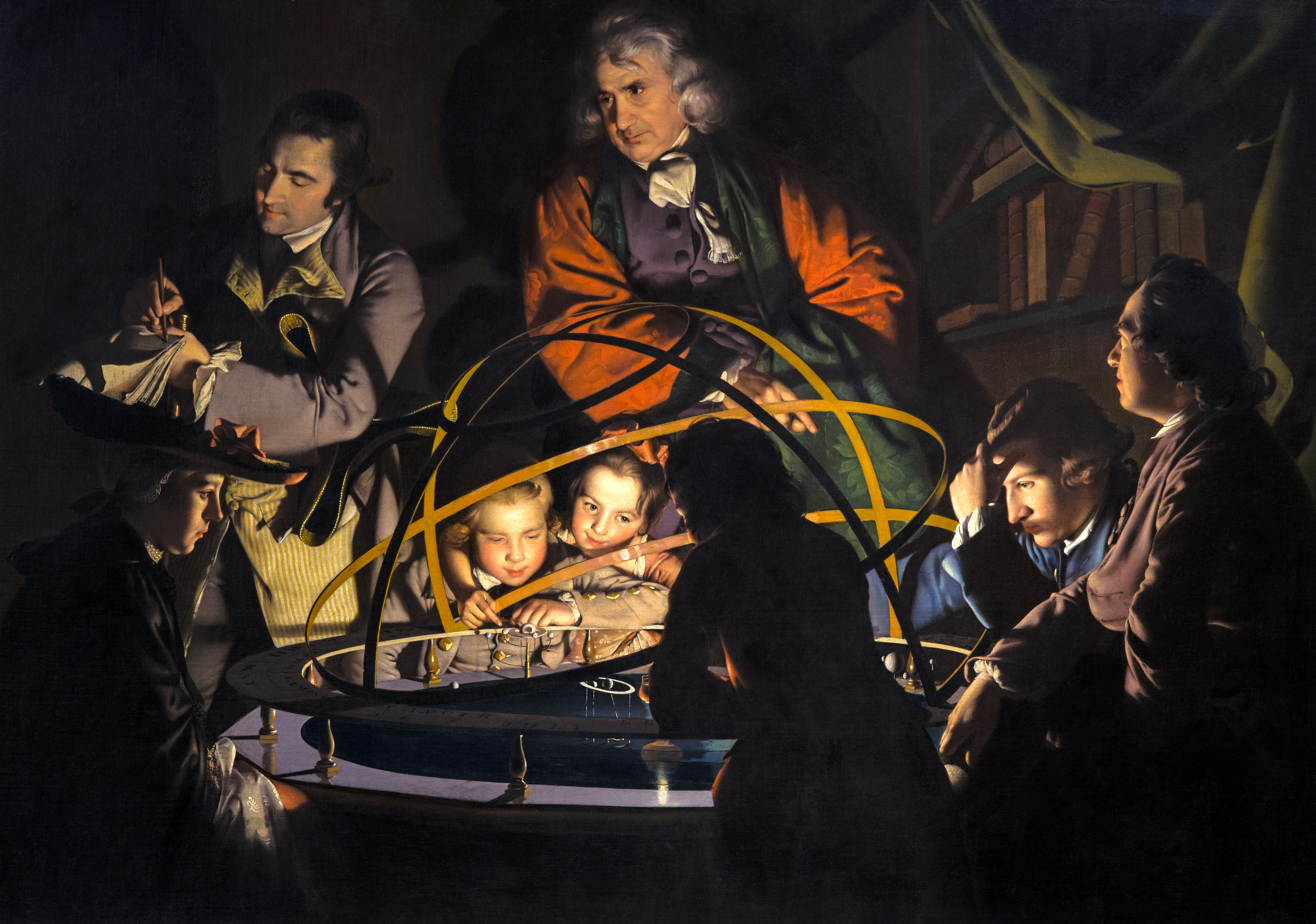
A Philosopher Lecturing on the Orrery, c. 1766

The Age of Enlightenment (also "Age of Reason" or simply "the Enlightenment") was a period of intellectual and cultural flourishing that emerged in the late 17th century in Western Europe and reached its peak in the 18th century as its ideas spread more widely across Europe. Characterized by an emphasis on reason, empirical evidence, and the scientific method, the Enlightenment promoted ideals of individual liberty, religious tolerance, progress, and natural rights. Its thinkers advocated for constitutional government, the separation of church and state, and the application of rational principles to social and political reform. The movement was characterized by the widespread circulation of ideas through new institutions: scientific academies, literary salons, coffeehouses, Masonic lodges, and an expanding print culture of books, journals, and pamphlets. The ideas of the Enlightenment undermined the authority of the monarchy and religious officials and paved the way for the political revolutions of the 18th and 19th centuries. A variety of 19th-century movements, including liberalism, socialism, and neoclassicism, trace their intellectual heritage to the Enlightenment.

== Difference between 'early modern' and the Renaissance ==
The expression "early modern" is sometimes used as a substitute for the term Renaissance, and vice versa. However, "Renaissance" is properly used in relation to a diverse series of cultural developments; which occurred over several hundred years in many different parts of Europe—especially central and northern Italy—and span the transition from late Medieval civilization and the opening of the early modern period.

The term "early modern" is most often applied to Europe, and its overseas empire. However, it has also been employed in the history of the Ottoman Empire. In the historiography of Japan, the Edo period from 1590 to 1868 is also sometimes referred to as the "early modern" period.

== Diplomacy and warfare ==
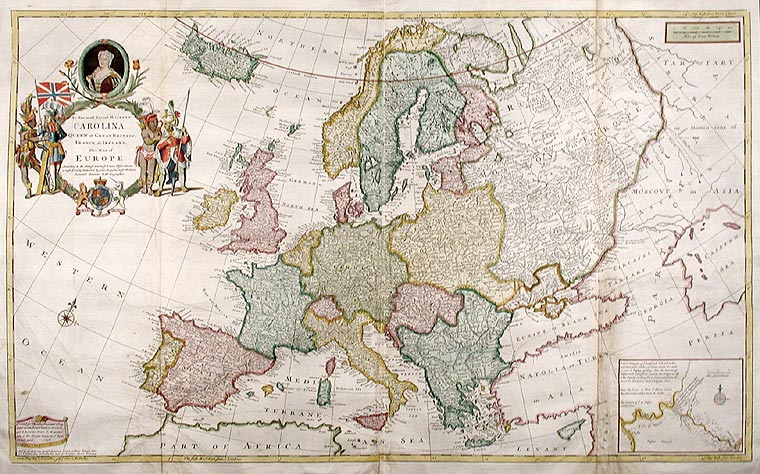
After the Peace of Westphalia in 1648, Europe's borders were largely stable. 1708 map by Herman Moll

The 17th century saw very little peace in Europe – major wars were fought in 95 years (every year except 1610, 1669 to 1671, and 1680 to 1682.) The wars were unusually ugly. Europe in the late 17th century, 1648 to 1700, was an age of great intellectual, scientific, artistic and cultural achievement. Historian Frederick Nussbaum says it was:

"prolific in genius, in common sense, and in organizing ability. It could properly have been expected that intelligence, comprehension and high purpose would be applied to the control of human relations in general and to the relations between states and peoples in particular. The fact was almost completely opposite. It was a period of marked unintelligence, immorality and frivolity in the conduct of international relations, marked by wars undertaken for dimly conceived purposes, waged with the utmost brutality and conducted by reckless betrayals of allies."

The worst came during the Thirty Years' War, 1618–1648, which had an extremely negative impact on the civilian population of Germany and surrounding areas, with massive loss of life and disruption of the economy and society.

=== Thirty Years' War: 1618–1648 ===
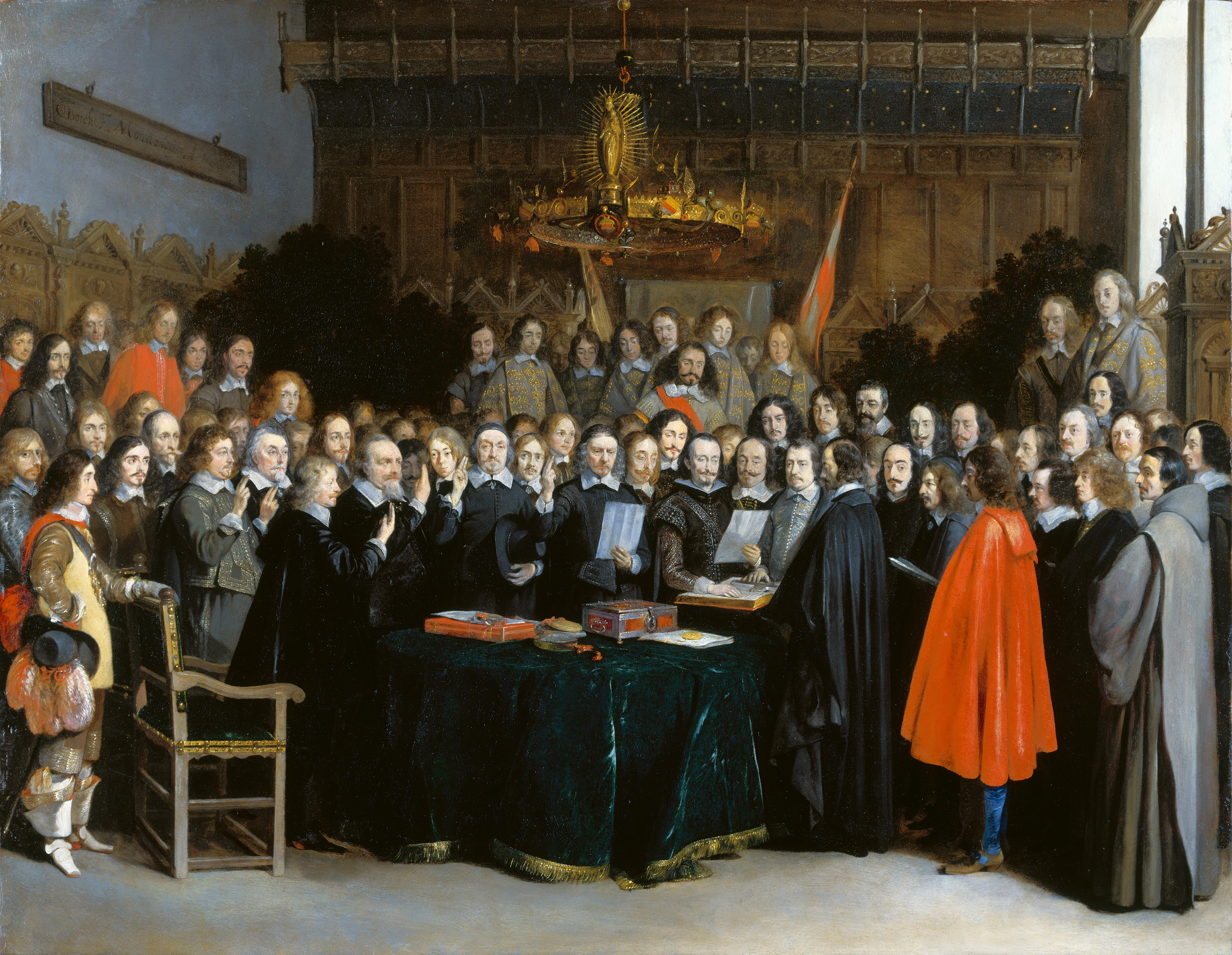
Treaty of Westphalia allowed Calvinism to be freely exercised.

The Reformation led to a series of religious wars that culminated in the Thirty Years' War (1618–1648), which devastated much of Germany, killing between 25% and 40% of its entire population. Roman Catholic House of Habsburg and its allies fought against the Protestant princes of Germany, supported at various times by Denmark, Sweden and France. The Habsburgs, who ruled Spain, Austria, the Crown of Bohemia, Hungary, Slovene Lands, the Spanish Netherlands and much of Germany and Italy, were staunch defenders of the Roman Catholic Church. Some historians believe that the era of the Reformation came to a close when Roman Catholic France allied itself with Protestant states against the Habsburg dynasty. For the first time since the days of Martin Luther, political and national convictions again outweighed religious convictions in Europe.

Two main tenets of the Peace of Westphalia, which ended the Thirty Years' War, were:

- All parties would now recognise the Peace of Augsburg of 1555, by which each prince would have the right to determine the religion of his own state, the options being Roman Catholicism, Lutheranism, and now Calvinism (the principle of cuius regio, eius religio).
- Christians living in principalities where their denomination was not the established church were guaranteed the right to practice their faith in public during allotted hours and in private at their will.

The treaty also effectively ended the Papacy's pan-European political power. Pope Innocent X declared the treaty "null, void, invalid, iniquitous, unjust, damnable, reprobate, inane, empty of meaning and effect for all times" in his bull Zelo Domus Dei. European sovereigns, Roman Catholic and Protestant alike, ignored his verdict.

Scholars taking a "realist" perspective on wars and diplomacy have emphasized the Peace of Westphalia (1648) as a dividing line. It ended the Thirty Years' War (1618–1648), where religion and ideology had been powerful motivating forces for warfare. Westphalia, in the realist view, ushered in a new international system of sovereign states of roughly equal strength, dedicated not to ideology or religion but to enhance status, and territorial gains. The Catholic Church, for example, no longer devoted its energies to the very difficult task of reclaiming dioceses lost to Protestantism, but to build large-scale missions in overseas colonial possessions that could convert the natives by the thousands using devoted members of society such as the Jesuits. According to Hamish Scott, the realist model assumes that "foreign policies were guided entirely by "Realpolitik," by the resulting struggle for resources and, eventually, by the search for what became known as a 'balance of power.'

Diplomacy before 1700 was not well developed, and chances to avoid wars were too often squandered. In England, for example, King Charles II paid little attention to diplomacy, which proved disastrous. During the Dutch war of 1665–67, England had no diplomats stationed in Denmark or Sweden. When King Charles realized he needed them as allies, he sent special missions that were uninformed about local political, military, and diplomatic situations, and were ignorant of personalities and political factionalism. Ignorance produced a series of blunders that ruined their efforts to find allies. King Louis XIV of France, by contrast, developed the most sophisticated diplomatic service, with permanent ambassadors and lesser ministers in major and minor capitals, all preparing steady streams of information and advice to Paris. Diplomacy became a career that proved highly attractive to rich senior aristocrats who enjoyed very high society at royal courts, especially because they carried the status of the most powerful nation in Europe. Increasingly, other nations copied the French model; French became the language of diplomacy, replacing Latin. By 1700, the British and the Dutch, with small land armies, large navies, and large treasuries, used astute diplomacy to build alliances, subsidizing as needed land powers to fight on their side, or as in the case of the Hessians, hiring regiments of soldiers from mercenary princes in small countries. The balance of power was very delicately calculated, so that winning a battle here was worth the slice of territory there, with no regard to the wishes of the inhabitants. Important peacemaking conferences at Utrecht (1713), Vienna (1738), Aix-la-Chapelle (1748) and Paris (1763) had a cheerful, cynical, game-like atmosphere in which professional diplomats cashed in victories like casino chips in exchange for territory.

== Major states ==
=== Holy Roman Empire ===
Since 1512, the Holy Roman Empire was also known as the Holy Roman Empire of the German nation. The Habsburg House of Austria held the position of Holy Roman Emperors since the mid-1400s and for the entire Early modern period. Despite the lack of a centralized political structure in a period in which national monarchies were emerging, the Habsburg Emperors of the Early modern period came close to form a universal monarchy in Western Europe.

The Habsburgs expanded their control within and outside the Holy Roman Empire as a result of the dynastic policy pursued by Maximilian I, Holy Roman Emperor. Maximilian I married Mary of Burgundy, thus bringing the Burgundian Netherlands into the Habsburg inheritance. Their son, Philip the Handsome, married Joanna the Mad of Spain (daughter of Ferdinand II of Aragon and Isabella of Castile). Charles V, Holy Roman Emperor (son of Philip and Joanna) inherited the Habsburg Netherlands in 1506, Habsburg Spain and its territories in 1516, and Habsburg Austria in 1519.

The main opponents of the Habsburg Empire were the Ottoman Empire and the Kingdom of France. The Habsburgs clashed with France in a series of Italian wars. The Battle of Pavia (1525) initiated the Habsburg primacy in Italy and the replacement of France as the main European power. The Ottoman siege of Vienna in 1529 was the beginning of a long series of wars between the Habsburgs and the Ottomans that lasted into the 18th century. The Holy Roman Emperor after Charles V, Emperor Ferdinand I, completed the Council of Trent and maintained Germany at peace until the Thirty Years' War (1618–1648). The Habsburgs controlled the elective monarchies of Hungary and Bohemia as well, and eventually turned these states into hereditary domains. The Ottomans' 2nd, and last, attempt to take Vienna in 1683, repelled by the largest cavalry charge in history led by the king of the Polish-Lithuanian Commonwealth, marked the end of Ottoman expansion into Europe.

=== Spain ===
In 1492 the Catholic Monarchs of Castile and Aragon funded Christopher Columbus's plan to sail west to reach the Indies by crossing the Atlantic. He landed on a continent uncharted by Europeans and seen as a new world, the Americas. To prevent conflict between Portugal and Castile (the crown under which Columbus made the voyage), the Treaty of Tordesillas was signed dividing the world into two regions of exploration, where each had exclusive rights to claim newly discovered lands.

The structure of the Spanish Empire was established under the Spanish Habsburgs (1516–1700) and under the Spanish Bourbon monarchs, the empire was brought under greater crown control and increased its revenues from the Indies. The crown's authority in The Indies was enlarged by the papal grant of powers of patronage, giving it power in the religious sphere.

Under Philip II of Spain, Spain, rather than the Habsburg empire, was identified as a more powerful nation than France and England globally. Furthermore, despite attacks from other European states, Spain retained its position of dominance with apparent ease. Spain controlled the Netherlands until the Dutch revolt, and important states in southern Italy. The Spanish claims to Naples and Sicily dated back to the 15th century, but had been marred by rival claims until the mid-16th century and the rule of Philip II. There would be no Italian revolts against Spanish rule until 1647. The death of the Ottoman emperor Suleiman the Magnificent in 1566 and the naval victory over the Ottoman Empire at the Battle of Lepanto in 1571 cemented the status of Spain as a superpower in Europe and the world. The Spanish Empire comprised territories and colonies of the Spanish Monarch in the Americas, Asia (Spanish Philippines), Europe and some territories in Africa and Oceania.

=== France ===
The Ancien Régime (French for "old regime") was the political and social system of the Kingdom of France from about 1450 until the French Revolution that started in 1789. The Ancien Régime was ruled by the late Valois and Bourbon dynasties. Much of the medieval political centralization of France had been lost in the Hundred Years' War, and the Valois Dynasty's attempts at re-establishing control over the scattered political centres of the country were hindered by the Wars of Religion). Much of the reigns of Henry IV, Louis XIII and the early years of Louis XIV were focused on administrative centralisation. Despite, however, the notion of "absolute monarchy" (typified by the king's right to issue lettres de cachet) and the efforts by the kings to create a centralized state, Ancien Régime France remained a country of systemic irregularities: administrative (including taxation), legal, judicial, and ecclesiastic divisions and prerogatives frequently overlapped, while the French nobility struggled to maintain their own rights in the matters of local government and justice, and powerful internal conflicts (like the Fronde) protested against this centralization.

The need for centralization in this period was directly linked to the question of royal finances and the ability to wage war. The internal conflicts and dynastic crises of the 16th and 17th centuries (the wars between Catholics and Protestants and the Habsburg's internal family conflict) and the territorial expansion of France in the 17th century demanded great sums which needed to be raised through taxes, such as the land tax (taille) and the tax on salt (gabelle) and by contributions of men and service from the nobility. The key to this centralization was the replacing of personal patronage systems organized around the king and other nobles by institutional systems around the state. The creation of intendants—representatives of royal power in the provinces—did much to undermine local control by regional nobles. The same was true of the greater reliance shown by the royal court on the "noblesse de robe" as judges and royal counselors. The creation of regional parlements had initially the same goal of facilitating the introduction of royal power into newly assimilated territories, but as the parlements gained in self-assurance, they began to be sources of disunity.

=== England ===
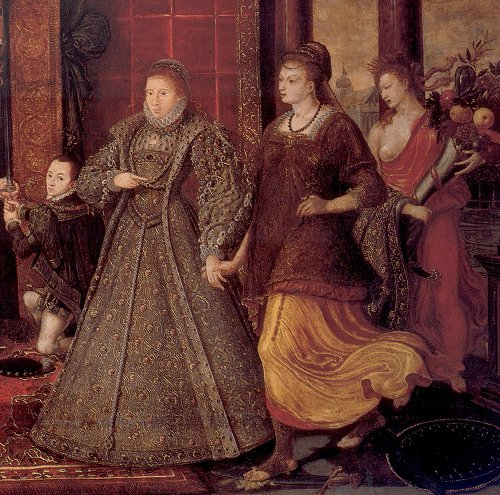
Elizabeth ushers in Peace and Plenty. Detail from The Family of Henry VIII: An Allegory of the Tudor Succession, c. 1572, attributed to Lucas de Heere.

The Elizabethan Era is the period associated with the reign of Queen Elizabeth I (1558–1603) and was a golden age in English cultural history. It was the height of the English Renaissance, and saw the flowering of English literature and poetry. This was also the time during which Elizabethan theatre grew. William Shakespeare, among others, composed highly innovative and powerful plays. It was an age of expansion and exploration abroad. At home the Protestant Reformation was established and successfully defended against the Catholic powers of Spain and France.

The Jacobean era was the reign James I of England (1603–1625). Overseas exploration and establishment of trading factories sped up, with the first permanent settlements in North America at Jamestown, Virginia in 1607, in Newfoundland in 1610, and at Plymouth Colony in Massachusetts in 1620. One king now ruled England and Scotland; the latter was fully absorbed by the Acts of Union 1707.

The tumultuous Caroline era was the reign of King Charles I (1625–1645), followed by his beheading by Oliver Cromwell's regime in 1649 . The Caroline era was dominated by the growing religious, political, and social conflict between the King and his supporters, termed the Royalist party, and the Puritan opposition that evolved in response to particular aspects of Charles' rule. The colonization of North America continued apace, with new colonies in Maryland (1634), Connecticut (1635), and Rhode Island (1636).

By the end of the 17th century, England had surpassed Italy to have the most productive economy in the world. The Glorious Revolution (1688) subjected the English crown to Parliament and sparked a Financial Revolution that made the state into a more creditworthy borrower than its absolutist rivals on the Continent whose unchecked monarchs were considered poorer credit risks by lenders. These economic and financial advantages were tested in the War of the Spanish Succession (1701–1714), in which a coalition of Great Britain, the Netherlands, the Habsburg monarchy, and Prussia opposed French hegemony, Britain won the strategic ports of Gibraltar and Minorca, and the country was set on a course towards "maritime, commercial, and financial supremacy."

=== Poland ===
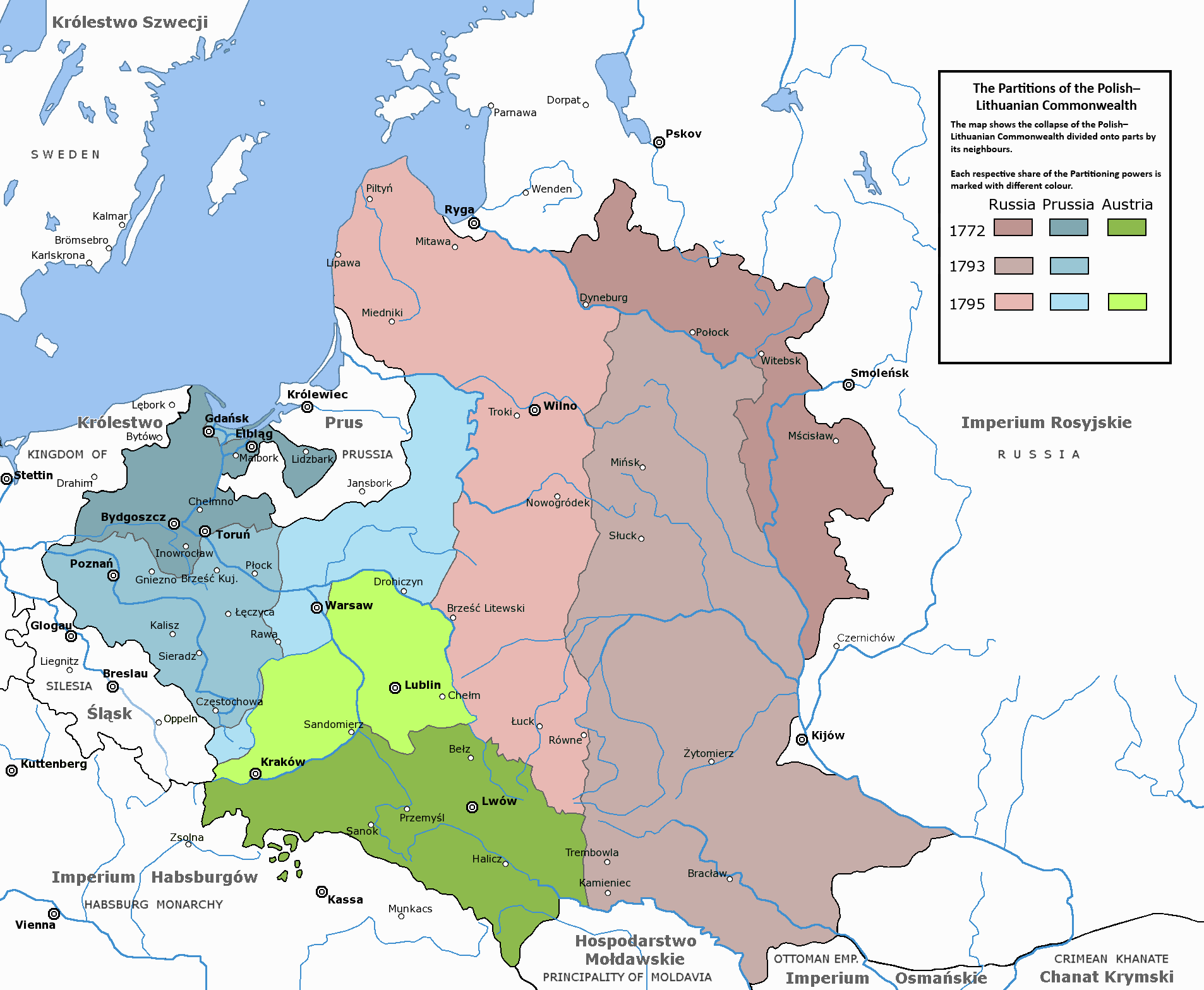
The three partitions of the Polish-Lithuanian Commonwealth: Russian (brown), Austrian (green) and Prussian (blue).

During the 1640s and 1650s, the Polish–Lithuanian Commonwealth faced near-extinction from a Cossack rebellion (1648–1657), the Polish–Russian War (1654–1667) and Swedish invasion (1655–1660). The Ottoman Empire’s second and last attempt to capture the Habsburg capital of Vienna (1683), however, was broken by the largest cavalry charge in history personally led by the King of Poland and Grand Duke of Lithuania. At the end of the 18th century, the country was carved up between Austria, Russia and Prussia (1772–1795).

=== Papacy ===
The papacy continued to exercise significant diplomatic influence during the Early modern period. The Popes were frequently assembling Holy Leagues to assert Catholic supremacy in Europe. During the Renaissance, Julius II and Paul III were largely involved in the Italian Wars and worked to preserve their primacy among the Italian princes. During the Counter-Reformation, the Papacy supported Catholic powers and factions all over Europe. Pope Pius V assembled the Catholic coalition that won the Battle of Lepanto against the Turks. Pope Sixtus V sided with the Catholics during the French wars of religion. Worldwide religious missions, such as the Jesuit China mission, were established by Pope Gregory XIII. Gregory XIII is also responsible for the establishment of the Gregorian calendar. Following the Peace of Westphalia and the birth of nation-states, Papal claims to universal authority came effectively to an end.

== Other political powers ==
- Ottoman Empire
- Early Modern Italy
  - Papal States
  - Republic of Florence, Duchy of Florence, Grand Duchy of Tuscany
  - Republic of Venice
  - Duchy of Milan
  - Republic of Genoa
  - Kingdom of Naples
- Kingdom of Portugal
- Dutch Republic
- Holy Roman Empire
  - Kingdom of Bohemia (Czech)
  - Habsburg monarchy (Austria)
- Early Modern Germany
  - Duchy of Prussia, Kingdom of Prussia
  - Duchy of Bavaria, Electorate of Bavaria
  - Electorate of the Palatinate
- Tsardom of Russia, Russian Empire
- Early Modern Sweden
- Denmark–Norway
- Early Modern Romania
- Kingdom of Hungary

== See also ==
- Renaissance
- Early Modern period
- Age of Discovery
- Protestant Reformation
- Catholic Counter-Reformation
- Scientific Revolution
- Thirty Years' War
- International relations 1648–1814
- Age of Enlightenment

== Sources ==
- Hall, A. Rupert (1970) [1954]. The Scientific Revolution, 1500–1800: The Formation of the Modern Scientific Attitude (2nd ed.). Boston: Beacon Press. ISBN 0-8070-5093-8.
- Major, J. Russell (1994). From Renaissance Monarchy to Absolute Monarchy: French Kings, Nobles & Estates. JHU Press. ISBN 0-8018-5631-0.
- Rice, Eugene, F. Jr. (1970). The Foundations of Early Modern Europe: 1460–1559. W.W. Norton & Co.
- John Coffey (2000), Persecution and Toleration in Protestant England 1558–1689, Studies in Modern History, Pearson Education
- Benjamin J. Kaplan (2007), Divided by Faith. Religious Conflict and the Practice of Toleration in Early Modern Europe. Cambridge University Press
- Joseph S. Freedman (1999), Philosophy and the Arts in Central Europe, 1500–1700: Teaching and Texts at Schools and Universities Aldershot: Ashgate
