= Easton Ski Area =

Ski hill in Deerfield, Massachusetts

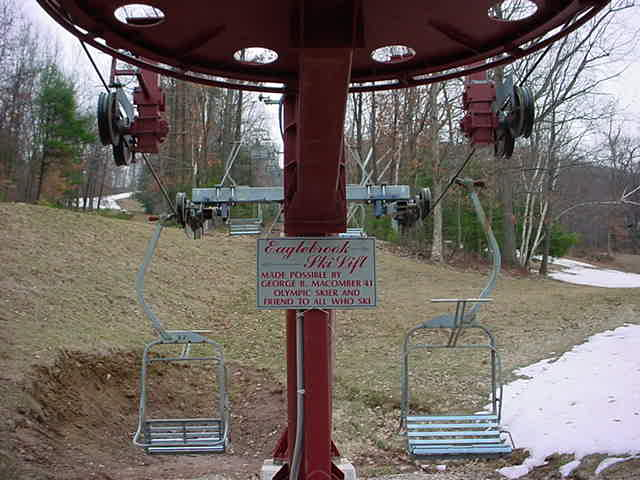
- The chairlift at the Easton Ski Area
- Interactive map of Easton Ski Area
- Location: Deerfield, Massachusetts, US
- Nearest city: Greenfield
- Lift system: 1 chairs: 1 Double
- Website: Eaglebrook School

Easton Ski Area, part of the Eaglebrook School, is a small, private alpine ski area located on the western slope of the Pocumtuck Range in Deerfield, Massachusetts.

Eaglebrook School's skiing history dates back to 1923. For many decades, various areas were used around the campus, including a rope tow served slope located near the northern portion of the present day ski area.

In the 1970s, a T-Bar lift was built from the bottom of the ski jumps to the top of the ridge, serving intermediate and expert terrain. A mid station was available for those using the lower mountain's beginner terrain. Years later, snowmaking and machine grooming were added.

In the mid-1990s, a novice trail was blasted just above the dormitories, providing the first top-to-bottom beginner terrain at the ski area.

Around the start of the 21st century, the T-Bar was removed and a slightly longer Doppelmayr double chairlift, purchased from Wachusett Mountain Ski Area, was installed.

== Terrain and lifts ==
- Macomber Chairlift - serves the entire mountain, including trails of all abilities.

== Snowmaking ==
Most of the trails at Easton Ski Area are covered with snowmaking. The snowmaking fleet includes many fan guns.
