= Eugene F. Rice Jr. =

American historian (1924–2008)

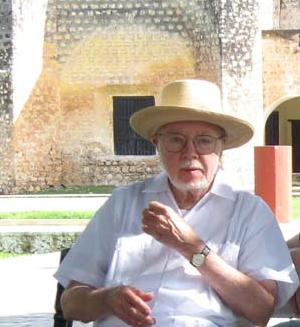
- Rice in Mexico, 2006
- Born: Eugene Franklin Rice Jr. August 20, 1924; Lexington, Kentucky, U.S.
- Died: August 4, 2008 (aged 83)
- Education: Harvard University
- Occupation: Historian
- Spouse: Charlotte Bloch
- Children: 3

Eugene Franklin Rice Jr. (August 20, 1924 – August 4, 2008) was an American historian specializing in the Church Fathers, Early Modern Europe, and the history of homosexuality (both male and female) in the Western world.

Rice was born in Lexington, Kentucky, and raised in Puerto Rico, where his father was president of The Central Aguirre Sugar Company.

He was educated at Eaglebrook School (1937–39) and Phillips Exeter Academy. He entered Harvard University in 1942, but was soon drafted. In the European theatre of operations, he served as sergeant (T3) in the Intelligence Section of a Signal Corps cryptanalysis company. Before getting his doctorate at Harvard in 1953 he studied two years at the École normale supérieure. It was in Paris that he met and married Charlotte Bloch from Prague, who had survived the Holocaust in London. Eugene Rice held a Guggenheim Fellowship in 1959 and along with his wife and three children, spent the academic year in Paris. From 1962 to 1963 Rice was at the Institute for Advanced Study in Princeton.

Rice was on the faculty of Cornell University from 1955 until 1964. He relocated to New York City to become a long-time member of the faculty of Columbia University, becoming chairman of its History Department in the early 1970s. In 1984, he was awarded the Columbia Great Teacher Award from the Society of Columbia Graduates. His books are as highly praised as his teaching and in 1986 Rice was awarded the Philip Schaff Prize from the American Society of Church History for Saint Jerome in the Renaissance. His Saint Jerome also won him the John Gilmary Shea Prize of the American Catholic Historical Association and the Award for Excellence from the American Academy of Religion. In 1991, fellow scholars John Monfasani and Ronald G. Musto paid tribute to him with a Festschrift: Renaissance Society and Culture: Essays in Honor of Eugene F. Rice, Jr. In addition to his scholarly pursuits, Eugene Rice was the longest serving executive director of the Renaissance Society of America (1966–82, 1985–87).

In his later years, his research interests continued to evolve. Rice was invited to present his new research on Western homosexuality as a distinguished visiting scholar at Toronto's Centre for Reformation and Renaissance Studies in 1992. Upon retirement in 1995, Rice became Shepherd Professor of History Emeritus and a member of the Society of Senior Scholars where, in later years, he continued to teach in the core curriculum. He founded and chaired the Columbia University Seminar on Homosexualities, which ran in the early 1990s. Rice was a member of the American Philosophical Society and the American Academy of Arts and Sciences.

== Selected publications ==
- The Renaissance Idea of Wisdom. 1958
- Foundations of Early Modern Europe, 1460–1559. 1970
- The Prefatory Epistles of Jacques Lefevre d'Etaples and Related Texts. 1972
- Medieval and Renaissance Studies. 1982
- Saint Jerome in the Renaissance. 1985
