= Mount Toby =

Upland in Sunderland and Leverett, Massachusetts, US

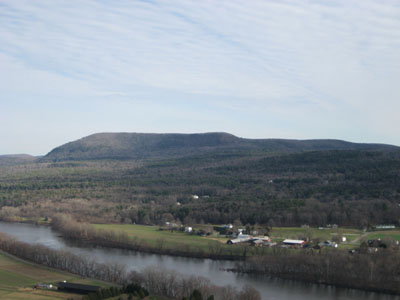
- Mount Toby as seen from South Sugarloaf

Highest point
- Elevation: 1,269 ft (387 m)
- Prominence: 856 ft (261 m)
- Coordinates: 42°29′16″N 72°32′15″W

Geography
- Location: Sunderland and Leverett, Massachusetts Massachusetts, U.S.
- Parent range: Associated with the Metacomet Ridge

Geology
- Rock age: 190 million years
- Mountain type(s): Fault-block; sedimentary

Climbing
- First ascent: Elnathan Toby (first reported)
- Easiest route: Telephone Line Trail

Mount Toby, 1,269 feet (387 m), is the highest summit of a sprawling collection of mostly wooded hills and knolls that rise from a distinct plateau-like upland in the towns of Sunderland and Leverett, Massachusetts, just east of the Connecticut River. This mountain mass, part of the Metacomet Ridge geology, is oval shaped and roughly three miles by two miles wide. Although three of the subordinate peaks have names of their own (Roaring Mountain, Ox Hill, Bull Hill), none of them are noteworthy on their own, and the designation “Mount Toby” is most often used (locally and formally) to describe the entire geologic mass. This article, therefore, describes the entire Mount Toby upland.

Mount Toby is notable for its high biodiversity, attractive woodlands, waterfalls, and its glacial kettle ponds (most notably Cranberry Pond). Although the summit is wooded, there is a fire tower, open to the public, which provides 360-degree views of Amherst and the Holyoke Range in the south; the Connecticut River and Mount Sugarloaf to the west; Mount Snow, Mount Ascutney, and Mount Monadnock in the north; and the nearby Peace Pagoda in Leverett to the east. Additionally, there are several cliffs located on the lower south and southwest facing slopes overlooking the Connecticut River Valley and the town of Sunderland.

== History ==
Mount Toby is named for Captain Elnathan Toby, a settler from colonial Springfield, said to be the first Caucasian to summit the mountain. Like other peaks in the Connecticut River Valley in the 18th century, a resort hotel was built on the summit of Mount Toby, but it burned down a year after it was constructed, and was not rebuilt. The land was subsequently acquired by the Massachusetts Agricultural College (now the University of Massachusetts Amherst), and is currently part of the Mount Toby State Demonstration Forest owned and managed by the University.

== Geology and ecosystem ==
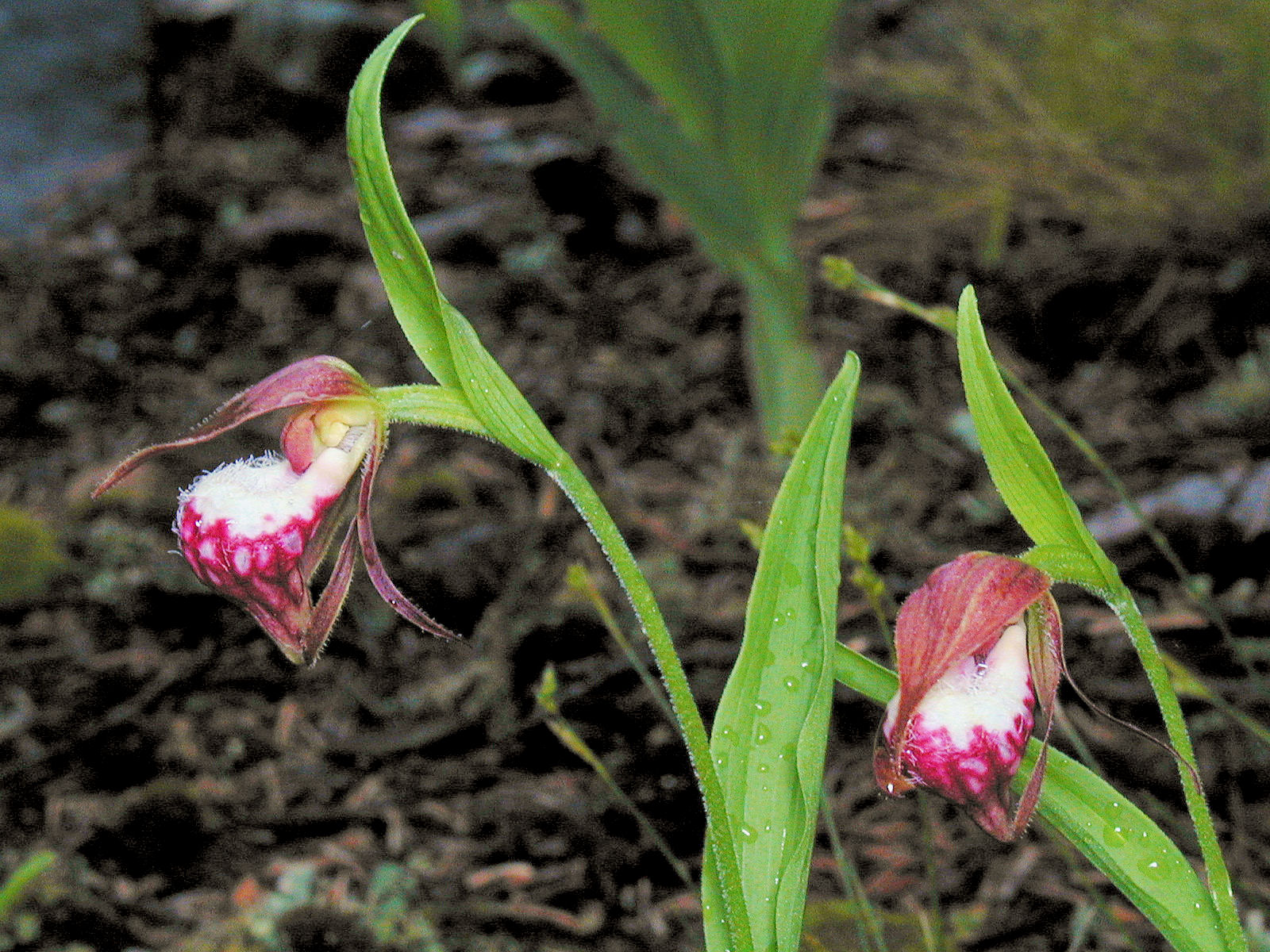
Ram's Head Lady Slipper

Mount Toby is considered one of the most biodiverse areas in New England. Fern and orchid species are particularly prolific on the mountain; forty-two of forty-five possible native fern species grow there as do rare orchids such as the Showy Lady Slipper and the Ram's Head Lady Slipper. Unlike the surrounding region, Mount Toby was never cleared of its timber during New England's intensive agricultural period in the 18th and 19th centuries; it has remained wooded throughout, although timber harvesting has played a part in its history.

Geologically speaking, Mount Toby is composed of a sedimentary conglomerate base known as Mount Toby Conglomerate. It is associated with the geologic processes which created the Metacomet Ridge that extends through New England from Long Island Sound to the Vermont border. Mount Toby is part of a larger geologic layer cake. The bottom layer is composed of arkose sandstone, visible across the Connecticut River on Sugarloaf Mountain in Deerfield, Massachusetts. The middle layer is composed basalt; it is most visible as the geology of the Pocumtuck Ridge, to the north. The top (youngest) layer is composed of Mount Toby Conglomerate. About 200 million years ago, as the continent of North America began rifting apart from Africa and Eurasia, a series of erosion and deposition episodes interspersed with heavy basalt lava flows created this layer cake. Faulting and earthquakes tilted the layers diagonally; subsequent erosion and glacial activity exposed the tilted "layers" of sandstone, basalt, and erosion-resistant conglomerate visible today. Although not composed of trap rock, Mount Toby is a closely associated with the trap rock Metacomet Ridge by virtue of its origin via the same rifting and uplift that created those mountains.

The west and south sides of Mount Toby drain via a series of brooks into the Connecticut River, thence Long Island Sound. The east side drains into Long Plain Brook, thence the Connecticut River. The north side drains into Cranberry Pond Brook, thence the Connecticut River.

== Waterfalls ==
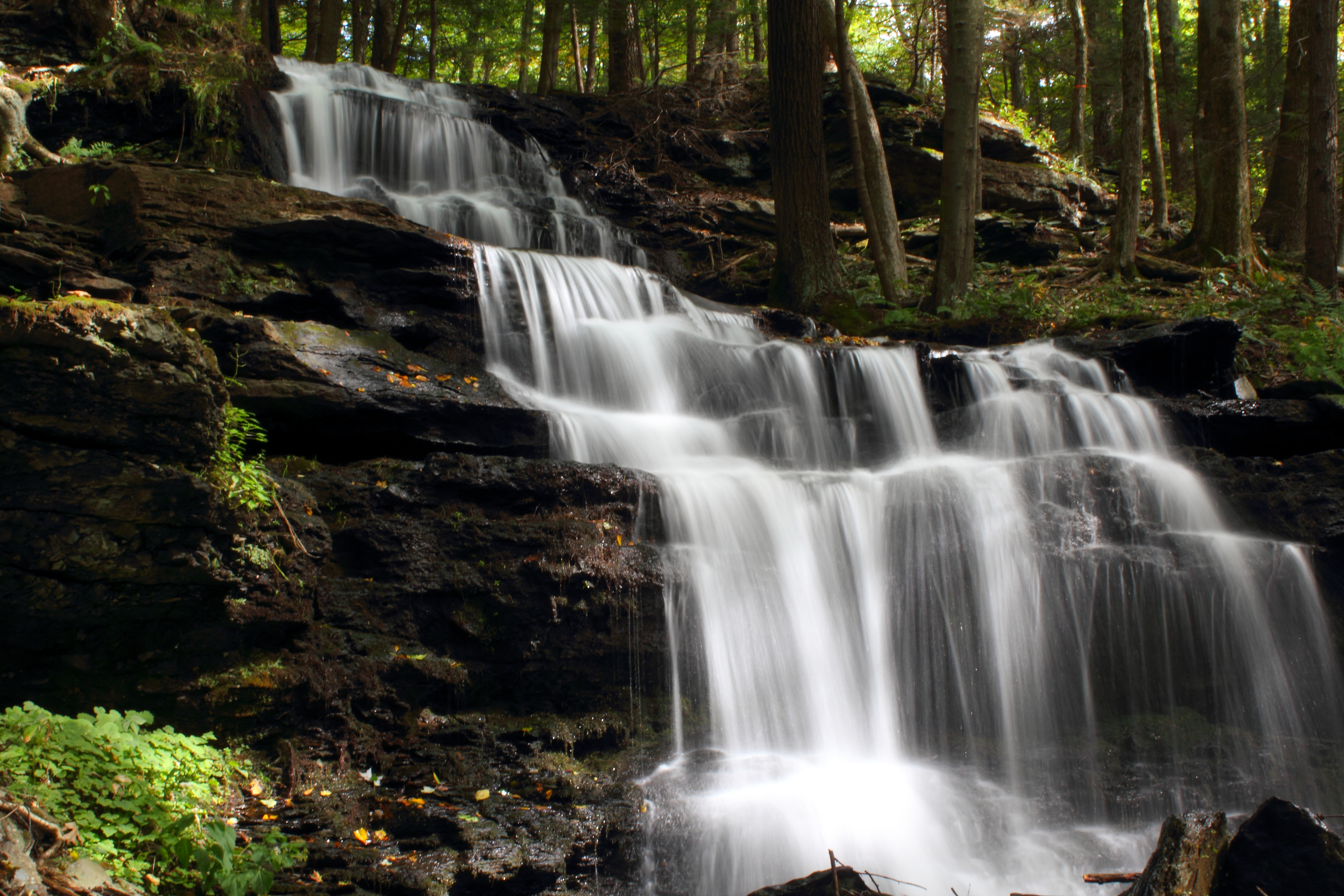
Gunn Brook Falls Sunderland, MA

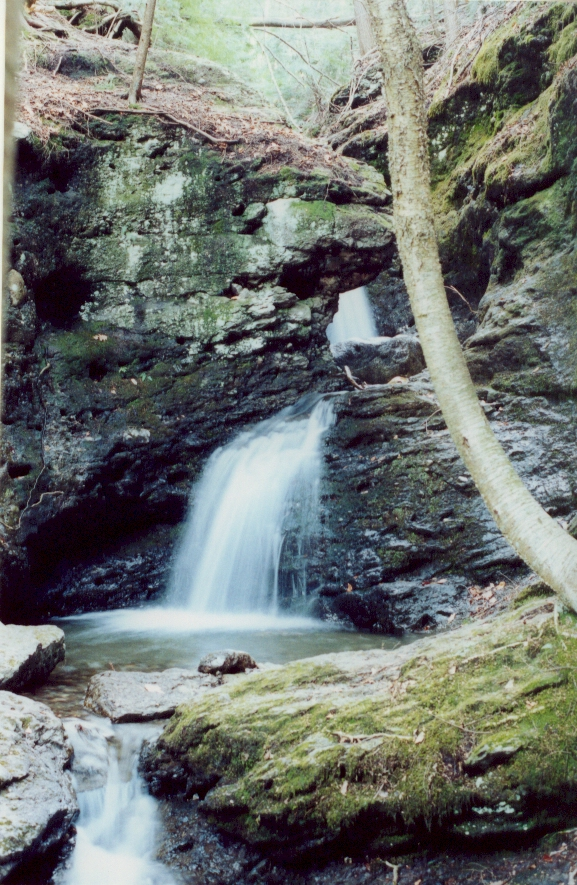
Middle basin, Roaring Falls

Located on the east side of the mountain is a series of waterfalls, pools, potholes, chutes, and cascades that plummet one hundred feet over rugged conglomerate ledges. The falls are most scenic in the spring and following periods of heavy precipitation; in the winter they are usually frozen over, and during dry periods the flow is often reduced to a trickle. Roaring Brook Falls is accessible by trail only. Gunn Brook Falls, located on the lower west side of the mountain, near the Connecticut River, and accessible via a short path from a public road, is smaller but has a more consistent flow. Slatestone Brook Falls, located on private property, is clearly visible from the road just north of Gunn Brook Falls. Slip Dog Falls is located in the center of the Mount Toby geography, west of the main summit and furthest from road access. A fifth waterfall, Green Swamp Brook Falls, is located on the south side of the massif, between the south ledges, just north of Bull Hill Road.

== Recreation ==
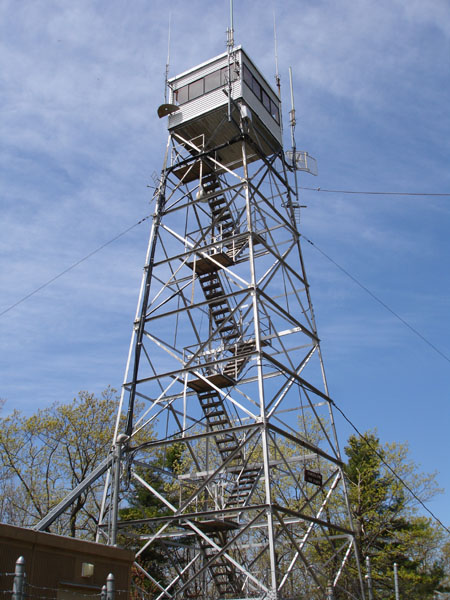
The Mount Toby Fire Tower

Mount Toby and its subordinate peaks are a popular hiking destination; the mountain hosts a network of trails, and the 47 mi (76 km) Robert Frost Trail crosses the summit and upland from south to north. With the exception of the Robert Frost Trail, many of the trails are poorly blazed. Because the surrounding lands are an educational and research forest, trees may also be marked with additional markings that may confuse hikers. Hikers should utilize recent topographic maps and orienteering skills to navigate the trail system. Horseback riding, fishing, ice skating, snowshoeing, cross country skiing, and mountain biking are also enjoyed in the mountain's environs. Most of the public trailheads (on the east side of Mount Toby) are not directly accessible via public transportation. Sunderland is the closest bus stop via the Pioneer Valley Transit Authority; these buses allow the transportation of up to three bicycles.

== Conservation ==
Although significant parcels on the mountain are protected—part of the Mount Toby State Demonstration Forest and other Massachusetts state holdings, or under easement or direct stewardship of the Nature Conservancy, the Trustees of Reservations, the United States Fish and Wildlife Service, and local conservation commissions—the large proportion of the mountain is in private ownership, with the Cowls Lumber Company the most significant landowner.

== See also ==
- Metacomet Ridge
- Metacomet-Monadnock Trail
- Robert Frost Trail (Massachusetts)

Adjacent summits:

↓ South

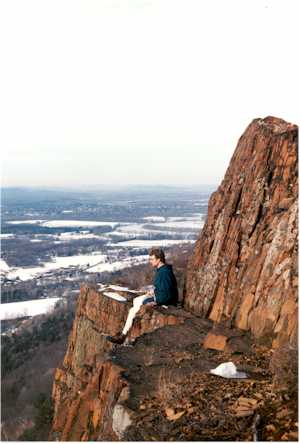
Mount Tom Range

South ↓

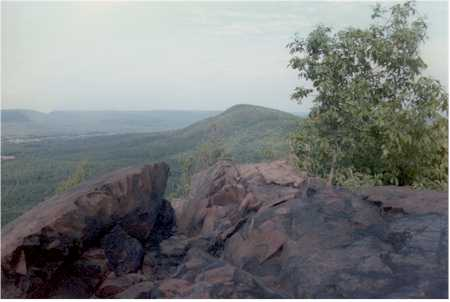
Holyoke Range

< West

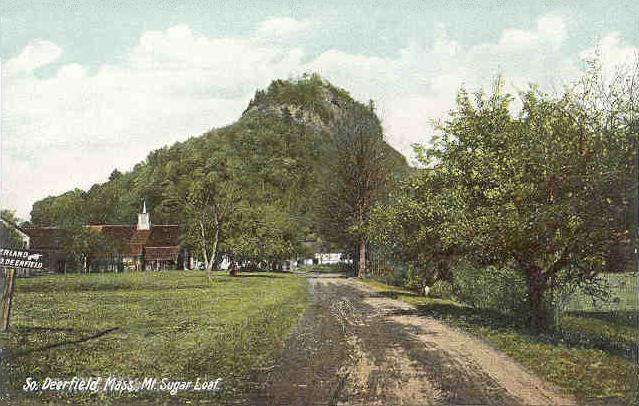
Pocumtuck Range
