= Eaglebrook School =

School in Massachusetts, USA

Coordinates: 42°32′35.58″N 72°35′33.33″W

- Deerfield, Massachusetts; United States

Information
- Type: Private junior boarding school
- Motto: Lumen, Fides, Labor, Facta (Light, Faith, Work, and Deeds)
- Established: 1922; 104 years ago
- Founder: Howard B. Gibbs
- Head of School: Andrew C. Chase '73
- Grades: 6–9
- Gender: Boys
- Enrollment: 257
  - Grade 6: 23
  - Grade 7: 46
  - Grade 8: 98
  - Grade 9: 80
- International students: 103
- Average class size: 10 students
- Student to teacher ratio: 3.5:1
- Campus: Rural, forested, mountainous
- Campus size: 850 acres
- Color
- Mascot: Eagle
- Rival: Cardigan Mountain School
- Tuition: $78,600 domestic boarding, $78,600 int'l boarding, $50,500 day
- Website: www.eaglebrook.org

Eaglebrook School is an independent junior boarding and day school for boys in grades six through nine. It is located in Deerfield, Massachusetts, United States. It is on the Pocumtuck Range near Deerfield Academy, and sited on an 850-acre (3.4 km^{2}) campus which is also preserved by the Deerfield Wildlife Trust. Eaglebrook School is accredited by the Association of Independent Schools in New England (AISNE).

== History ==
Eaglebrook School was founded in 1922 by Howard Gibbs, a friend of Headmaster Frank Boyden of Deerfield Academy. Gibbs, who graduated from Amherst College, envisioned a younger boy's boarding school that allowed boys to develop their innate abilities, discover new interests, and gain confidence.

Thurston Chase, an Eaglebrook teacher and Williams College graduate, took over the school after Gibbs' unexpected death. Student enrollment was expanded, and the school grew to include a gymnasium, tennis courts, a learning center, a science building, and four new dormitories.

After Chase's retirement, his son, Stuart Chase, became the headmaster. The school continued to grow as it bought 500 adjacent acres and added new playing fields, a track, a ski area with snow making and chair lift, a swimming pool, and two new dormitories.

In 2002, Andrew Chase, son of Stuart and Eaglebrook's former director of development, became the current headmaster.

The campus has undergone extensive massive upgrades since the mid-1990s. Baines House and the Thurston C. Chase Learning Center have been renovated. The Schwab Family Pool, and the McFadden Rink at Alfond Arena and a new track and field facility were built in the late 1990s. Two new dormitories, Kravis House and Mayer House, were completed in the early 2000s. In 2007, a major renovation was undertaken on Flagler House, Halsted House, and Taylor House. The Learning Center was also extensively renovated then. During the summer of 2010, the Sports Center was renovated, adding two new international squash courts, bringing the total to six, a new student lounge and student fitness room, and a 50-kilowatt solar panel system on the roof of the gym. The Edward P. Evans Academic Center for Science, Art, and Music, was opened in 2017.

== Governance ==
Eaglebrook is owned by the Allen-Chase Foundation, a nonprofit educational trust.

== Athletics ==
Many sports are offered:

Fall athletic offerings

- Cross country
- Football
- Mountain biking
- Soccer
- Water polo
- Pickleball

Winter athletic offerings

- Basketball
- Ice hockey
- Skiing (competitive and recreational)
- Ski patrol
- Snowboarding
- Squash
- Swimming

Spring athletic offerings

- Lacrosse
- Baseball
- Golf
- Tennis
- Track and field
- Ultimate disc
- Rock climbing

=== Easton Ski Area ===
Eaglebrook houses the Easton Ski Area, a small, private alpine ski area for Eaglebrook students and faculty. The ski area is served by a double chairlift and snowmaking, and is used by Eaglebrook students and faculty, as well as Eaglebrook's skiing teams and junior ski patrol.

== Notable alumni ==
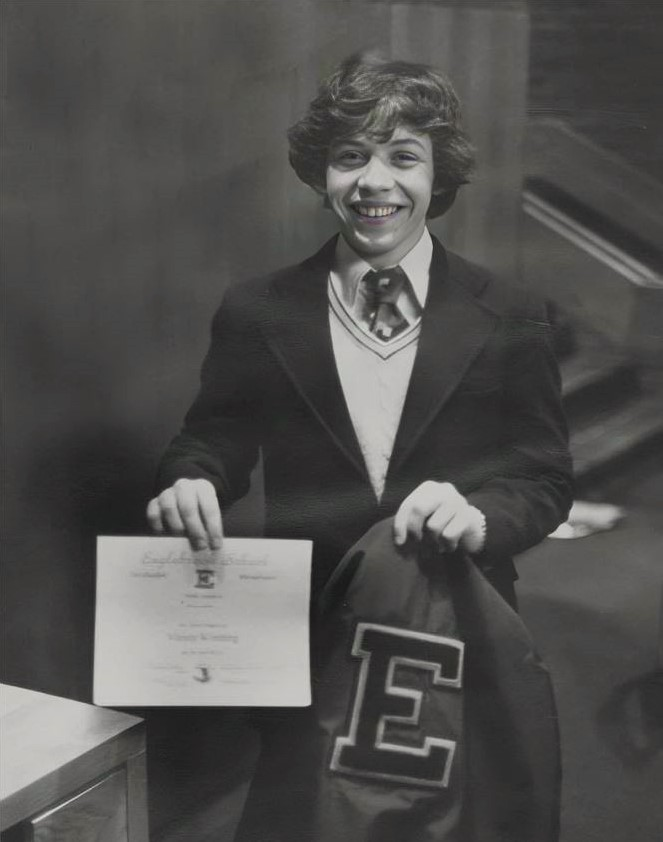
King Abdullah bin Al-Hussein, when he was a prince, receiving a certificate from Eaglebrook School in 1977

- King Abdullah II of Jordan
- Michael Beschloss
- Barry Bingham Jr.
- Henry Bromell '63, author, television writer/producer
- Nick Bromell
- Doug Burden
- Ennis Cosby
- Tony Dalton, Mexican-American actor
- Cameron Douglas, actor
- Michael Douglas '60, actor, director
- Peter Duchin, pianist, orchestra leader
- Chris Hedges '71, author, war correspondent, activist
- Thomas Hoving, former director of the Metropolitan Museum of Art
- J. B. Jackson, writer, publisher, instructor, sketch artist in landscape design
- Henry Kravis '60, investment banker, philanthropist
- Lewis "Scooter" Libby '65
- Rusty Magee '70
- Laurence Mark '64 film producer
- Mark Whitney Mehran
- Eugene F. Rice, Jr.
- Duncan Sheik '86
- Chris Waddell, Paralympics skiing champion
- Jason Wu, fashion designer
