= Pocumtuck Ridge Trail =

Trail in Greenfield, MA, USA

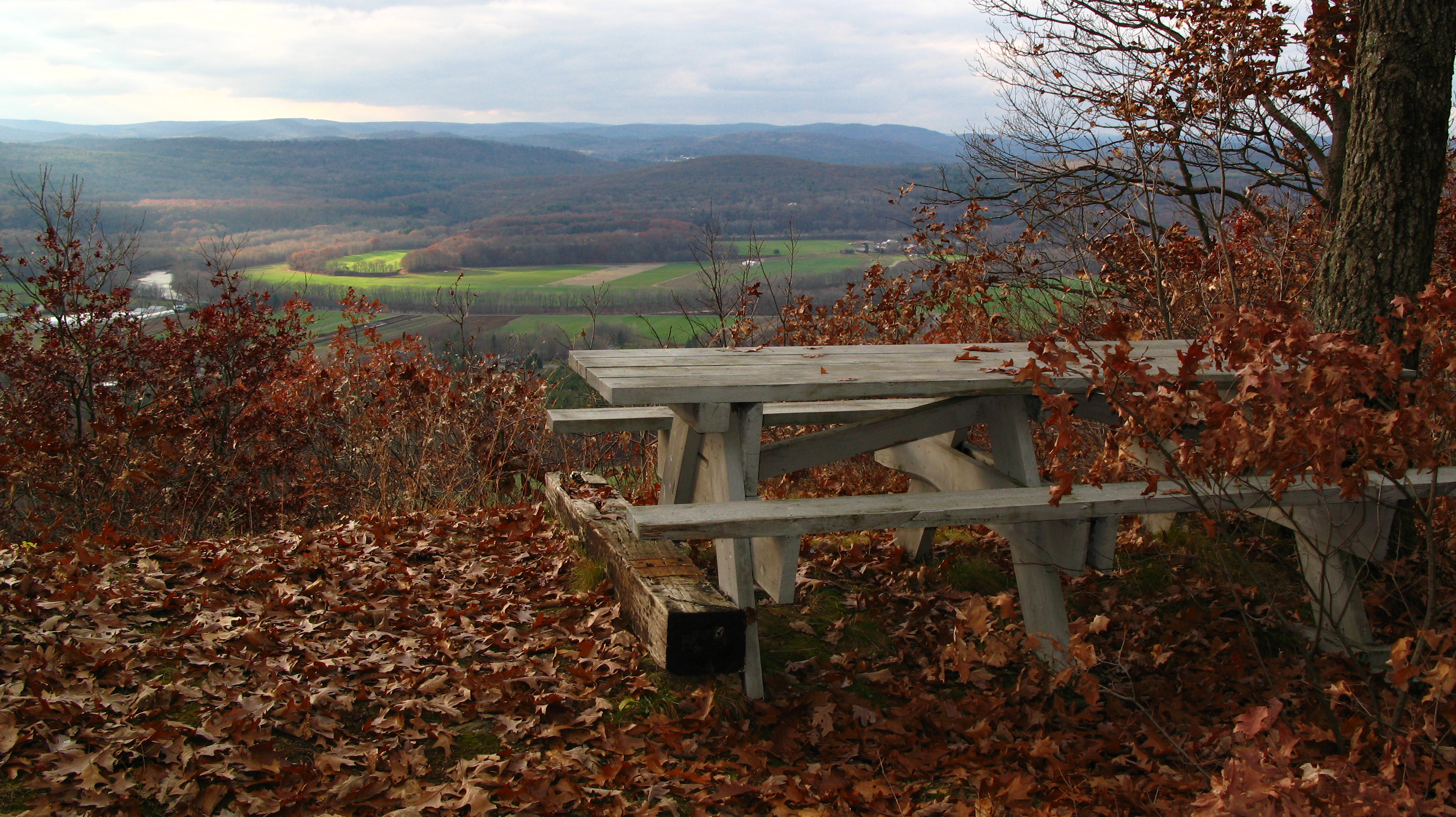
- Pocumtuck Ridge Trail looking west in South Deerfield MA. Mill Village Rd and the Deerfield River can be seen in the distance.
- Interactive map of Pocumtuck Ridge Trail
- Location: South Deerfield, MA., USA
- Coordinates: 42°31′26″N 72°35′29″W

The Pocumtuck Ridge Trail is a 20-mile (32 km) footpath that traverses the Pocumtuck Range of Deerfield and Greenfield, Massachusetts.

The trail is known for its dramatic views of the Deerfield River and Connecticut River valleys from extensive cliff faces. It traverses the ridgeline from Sugarloaf Mountain, at the southern end of the range, in the Mount Sugarloaf State Reservation, north over the main ridgeline of Pocumtuck Ridge, to Poet's Seat in Greenfield.

Seventy percent of the footway is located on conservation land. As of May 2010, an exception exists approximately one mile north of the east–west crossing high tension power line that is itself north of Stage Road and Ridge Road in Deerfield. Here, a private landowner has barricaded the trail with orange snow fencing, and has posted a plethora of no-trespassing signs including "you do not have permission to be here" and "you are being watched."
