= Mark Whitney Mehran =

American author and racer

Mark Whitney Mehran bibliography

Mark Whitney Mehran (also known as MWM) is an American author, business owner, land speed racer, Hot Rod and Chopper builder and Pinstriper. Born and raised in California, Mehran attended Eaglebrook School and Cate School, and graduated from Brown University with an honors degree in English and American Literature.

== Builder ==
Mehran has been building traditional hot rods, rat rods and motorcycle choppers at Hot Rod Surf since 1996. He has built many notable cars and bikes such as the “Silver Bullet”, “Blue Dream”, “O.R.M.” chopper and many other featured in books, movies and driving around the south California area.

== Business ==
=== Hot Rod Surf ===
Mehran started Hot Rod Surf in 1996. Hot Rod Surf started as a Surf Shop in Mission Beach, California. The shop moved locations to Pacific Beach, California. Mark built as many as 3-5 Hot Rods and Choppers per year out of Hot Rod Surf from 1996 to 2008.

=== Hot Rod Surf Publishing ===
In 2006 Mark Mehran started HOT ROD SURF Publishing, a label that distributes books and DVDs. Currently HOT ROD SURF Publishing has published 2 books and 3 DVDs.

Hot Rod Surf Publishing titles:

- HOT ROD SURF ‘All Steel All Real’ Vol.1
- How To Guide of Traditional Freehand Pinstriping Techniques
- How To Service Your Hot Rod DVD

== Author ==
Mehran writes books surrounding his lifestyle and interests of hot rods, pinstriping and custom culture.

Books:

- HOT ROD SURF 100% Genuine ISBN 0-9786756-1-4
- Basic Hot Rod Pinstriping Techniques with HOT ROD SURF ISBN 0-9786756-0-6

Mehran writes articles for Hot Rod magazines including:

- Rebel Rodz
- OverDrive Hot Rod News

== Land Speed Racer ==
Mehran joined the San Diego Roadster Club in 2007. He races O.R.M. bike number 1717B a A-PBG Harley Davidson in the 1350cc motorcycle class. At 2007 Bonneville Speed Week Mehran added a turbo to his motorcycle and set the world land speed record for his class on August 13, 2007.

== Artist ==
Mehran is an accomplished pinstriper of hot rods, motorcycles and Kustom Culture items.
