= Sugarloaf Mountain (Massachusetts) =

Butte-like mountain located in Deerfield, Massachusetts, United States

Sugarloaf Mountain (South Sugarloaf and North Sugarloaf)
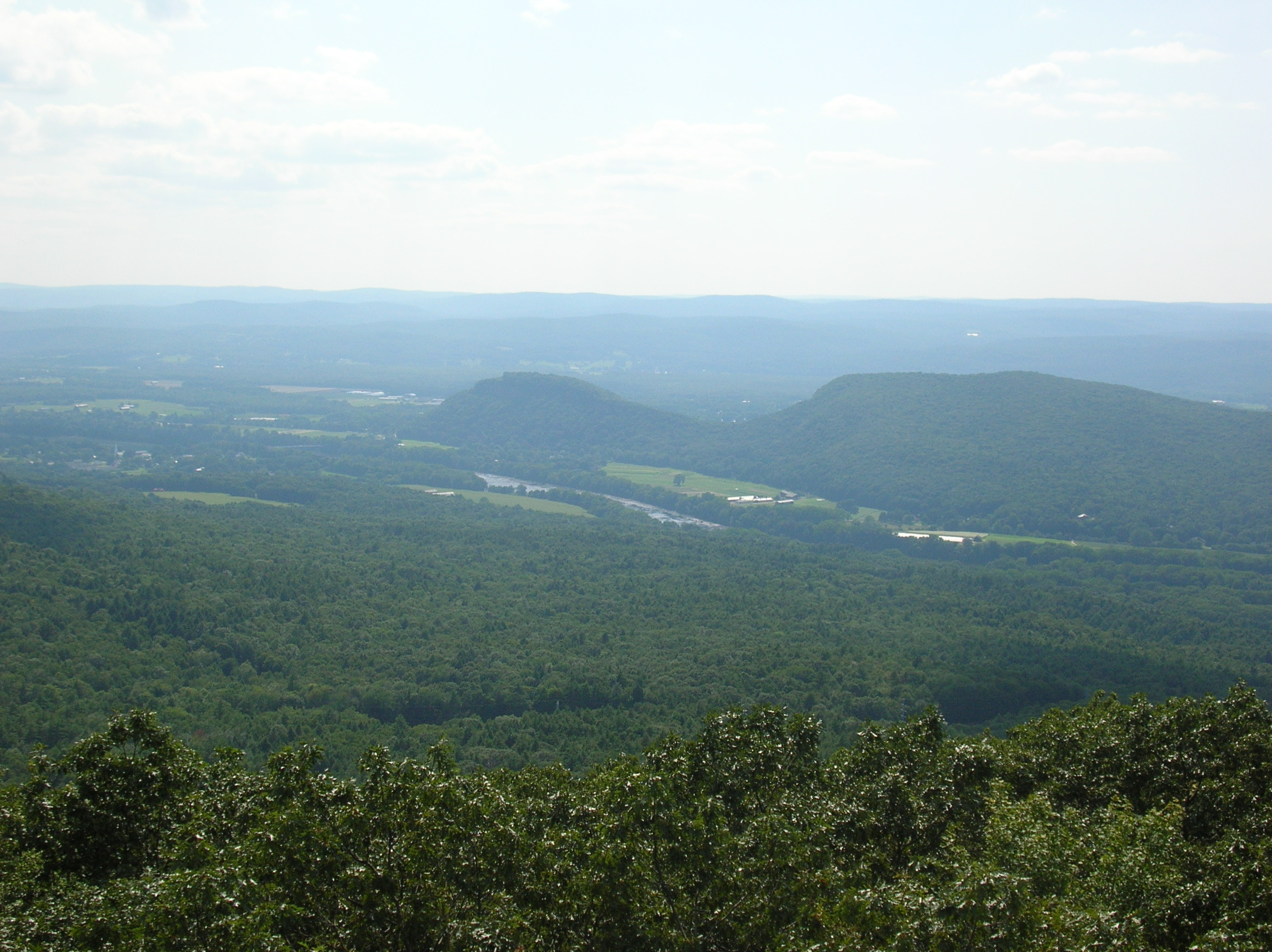
- South and North Sugarloaf viewed from Mt. Toby

Highest point
- Elevation: 652 ft (199 m)and 791 ft (241 m)
- Coordinates: 42°28′22″N 72°35′51″W and 42°29′28″N 72°35′53″W

Geography
- Location: South Deerfield, Massachusetts
- Parent range: Pocumtuck Range/ Metacomet Ridge

Geology
- Rock age: 210 million yrs.
- Mountain type(s): Fault-block; sedimentary

Climbing
- Easiest route: Auto road

Sugarloaf Mountain or Mount Sugarloaf, is a butte-like mountain located in South Deerfield, Massachusetts, United States, with two summits, North Sugarloaf Mountain 791 ft (241 m) and its more popular knee, South Sugarloaf Mountain 652 ft (199 m). Its cliffs, made of arkose sandstone, are a very prominent landscape feature visible for miles. Despite low elevations relative to the Berkshire Mountains to the west, dramatic cliff faces and a rise of 500 feet (150 m) to 600 feet (180 m) from the nearby Connecticut River make the mountain a popular tourist and hiking destination. Sugarloaf Mountain is the southern terminus of the Pocumtuck Range.

== Origin of the name ==
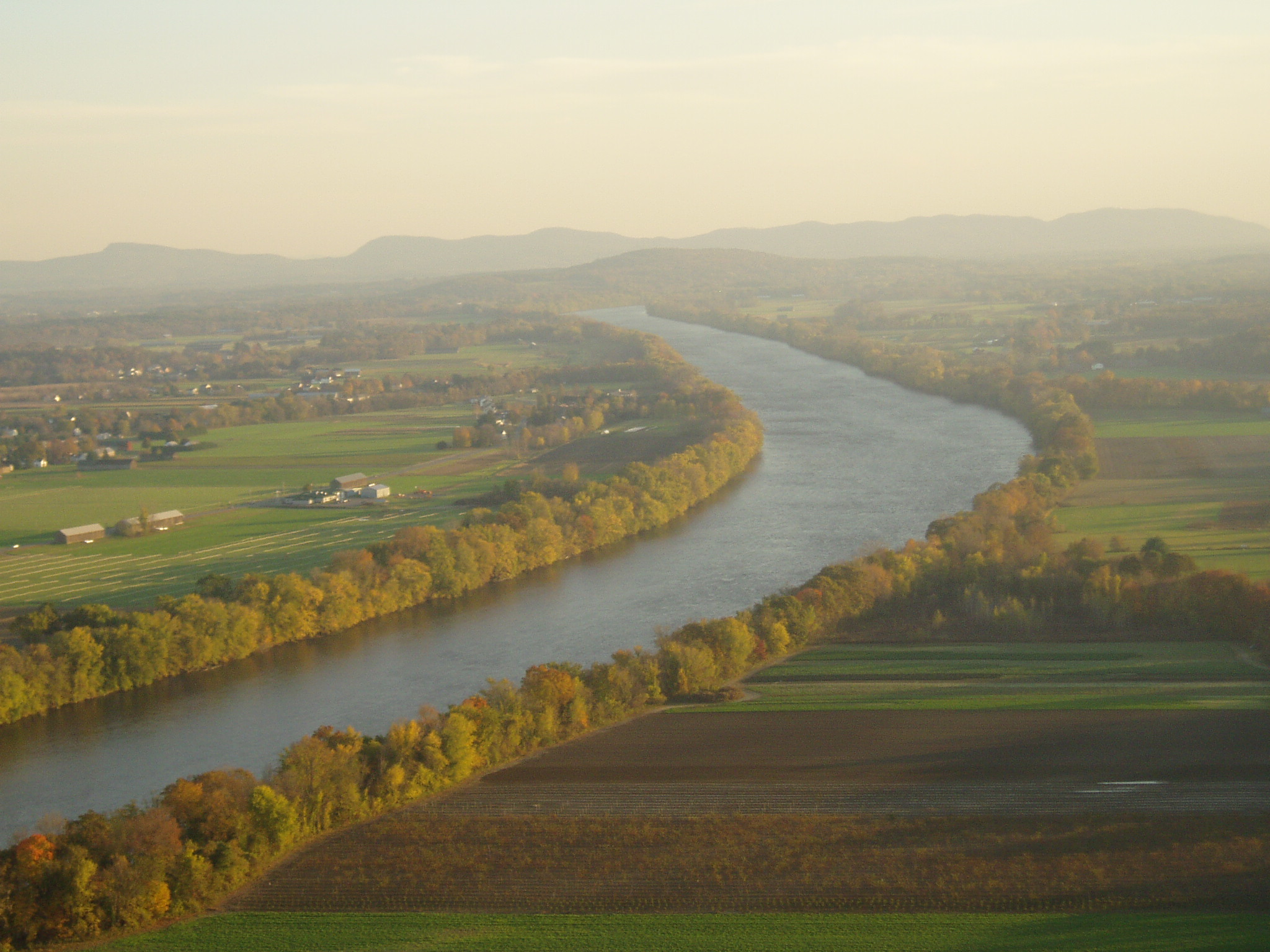
View of the Connecticut River from South Sugarloaf. Holyoke Range visible in the background.

The name sugarloaf refers to the loaf-like shape that sugar was once molded into for shipment. The names Sugarloaf Mountain and Mount Sugarloaf are both used to describe this mountain. USGS sources and published hiking maps refer to (North and South) Sugarloaf Mountain. However, the Massachusetts state reservation encompassing them is called the Mount Sugarloaf State Reservation. The name Mount Sugarloaf is sometimes used to describe only the south summit, and the north summit is sometimes described as the Pocumtuck Ridge. Both names are used locally.

The original Native American name for the mountain is Wequamps (or Wequomps). The root wehqu- in this name or weckw- in Weckwannuck "Sugarloaf Brook" means "at the point of or extremity of" and occurs in placenames indicating a stopping point. According to Native American myth, Sugarloaf Mountain is the carcass of a human-eating giant beaver who lived in a lake now occupied by the Connecticut River. The people complained to the god Hobomok that the beaver was greedy, and consuming all their resources. In response Hobomok decided to kill the beaver with a club he fashioned from a large tree. After the struggle, the beaver died, sank to the bottom of the lake, turned to stone, and became what is now Sugarloaf Mountain. There may be some truth to this tale; 15,000 years ago the Connecticut River from northern Vermont to southern Connecticut was post-glacial Lake Hitchcock. A now extinct species of giant beaver as big as black bears once inhabited North America at about the same time (see Pocumtuck Range for details).

== Geology ==
Sugarloaf Mountain, geologically contiguous with the Pocumtuck Ridge to the north, is composed of Triassic arkose sandstone and conglomerate. The Sugarloaf arkose was formed in a rift valley and sits in a half graben regionally called the Deerfield rift basin. The rift basin formed in Triassic-Jurassic time and is part of an area of crustal extension that extended from Long Island Sound into Vermont and New Hampshire. The 2,000 metres (6,600 ft) thick Sugarloaf arkose is the basal unit of the Deerfield rift basin and was formed by fluvial and alluvial processes. It is overlain by 50 m (160 ft) of lacustrine deposits called the Fall River beds. The Fall River beds are capped by 80 m (260 ft) of tholeiitic basalt flows which are most visible as part of the geology of the Pocumtuck Ridge to the north. The basalts are overlain by a black siltstone to conglomerate called the Turners Falls Sandstone and Mt. Toby Conglomerate. Mount Toby, the type locality for the Mt. Toby Conglomerate, can be seen directly across the Connecticut River from Sugarloaf Mountain.

About 200 million years ago, as the continent of North America began rifting apart from Africa and Eurasia, a series of erosion and deposition episodes interspersed with basalt lava flows created this layer cake. Faulting and earthquakes tilted the layers; subsequent erosion and glacial activity exposed the tilted "layers" of sandstone, basalt, and erosion-resistant conglomerate visible today. Although not composed of basalt trap rock, Sugarloaf Mountain is a closely associated with the Metacomet Ridge by virtue of its origin via the same rifting and uplift that created those mountains.

The Sugarloaf Formation (or Sugarloaf Arkose), of which Mt. Sugarloaf is partially composed, was deposited mainly by rivers and alluvial fans, with some localized floodplain ponds or swamps. The formation is known in other locations to preserve Triassic fossils such coprolites, plant remains such as Clathropteris and Equisitites, and fishes such as Semionotus, Redfieldius, and Ptycholepis. Additionally, the Sugarloaf Formation preserves rare examples of lithified armored mud balls.

== Recreation ==
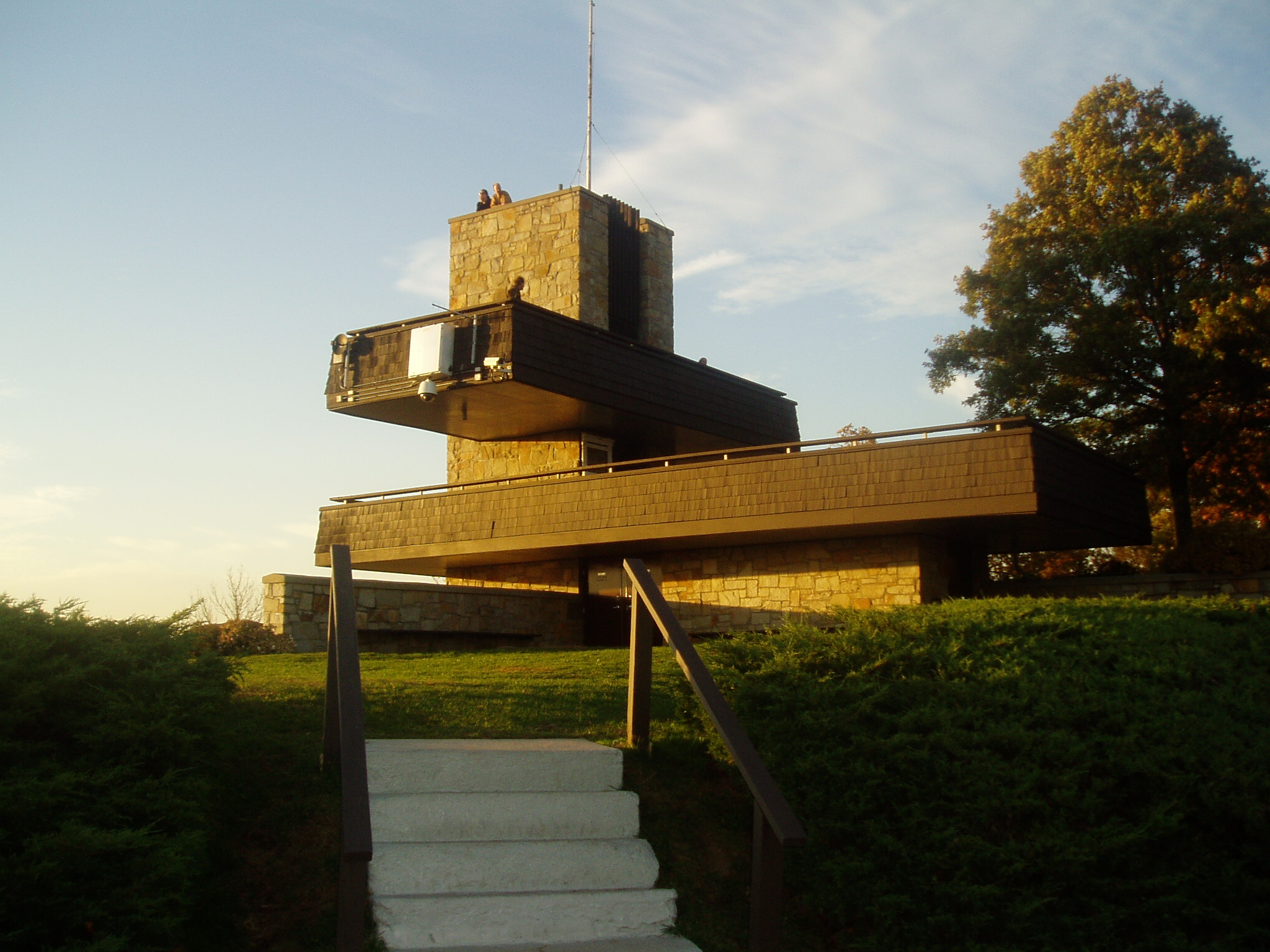
South Sugarloaf observation platform

A seasonal auto road climbs the summit of South Sugarloaf (open late spring through the fall foliage season), and a small seasonal observation tower is located on the summit. Several steep hiking trails, including the 20-mile (32 km) Pocumtuck Ridge Trail, make the mountain a favorite local hiking destination.

Most of the mountain has been conserved as part of the Mount Sugarloaf State Reservation. The reservation is easily accessible via Route 116 and is only a 15-minute drive from the University of Massachusetts Amherst campus. There is parking at the base of the mountain and at the top of the paved road that leads from the parking area to the summit of South Sugarloaf. It is free to hike the trails or climb the road by foot or by bike, but there is a nominal fee for vehicles. North Sugarloaf Mountain is only accessible by foot; a small cave is located just beneath the summit ledges.

== Film and television ==
In Fall 2008, the Mel Gibson film Edge of Darkness was filmed at the summit of South Sugarloaf. The observation tower was temporarily renovated for the film.

== Gallery ==
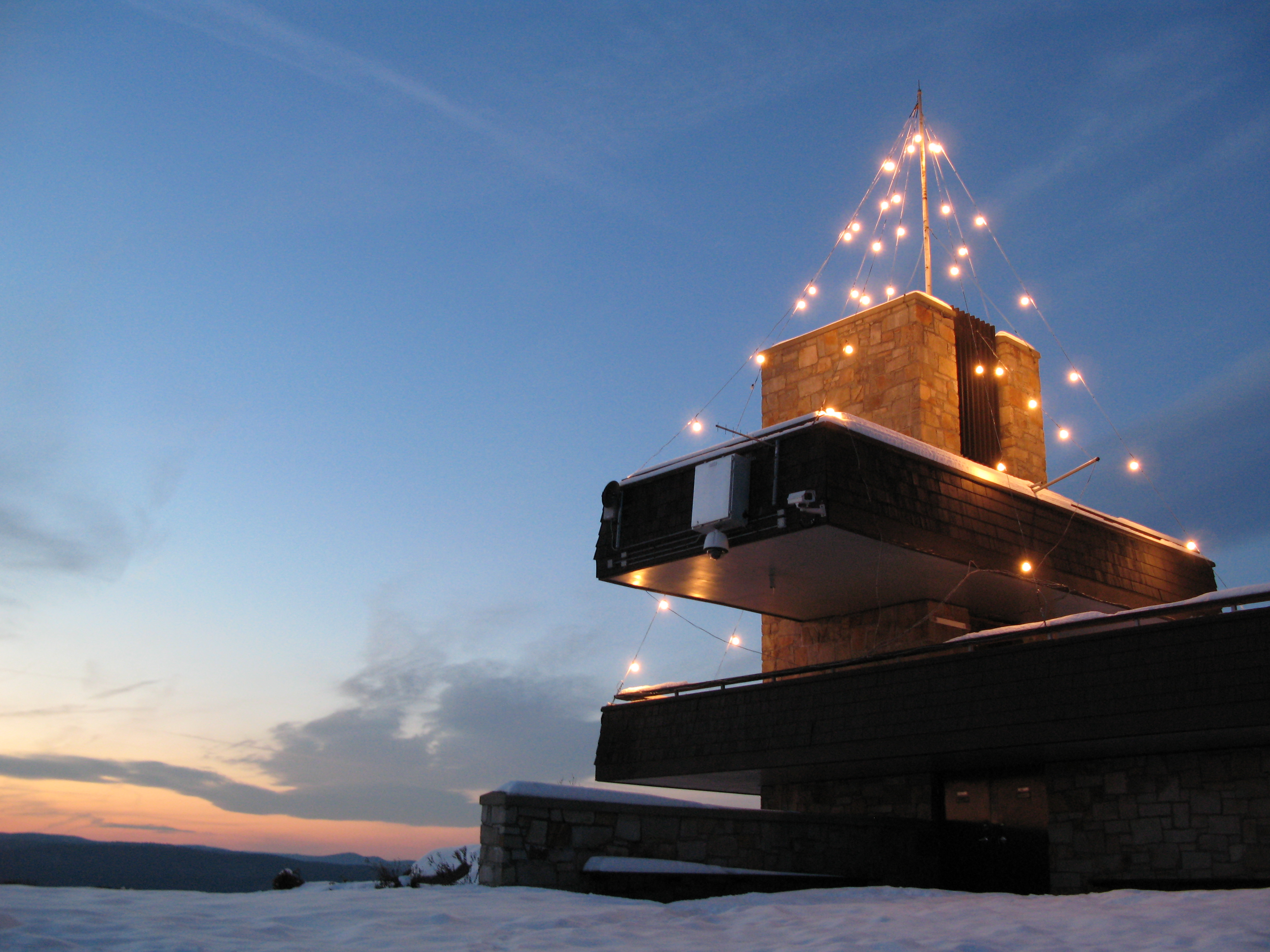
Observation Deck on Mt Sugarloaf in South Deerfield MA.

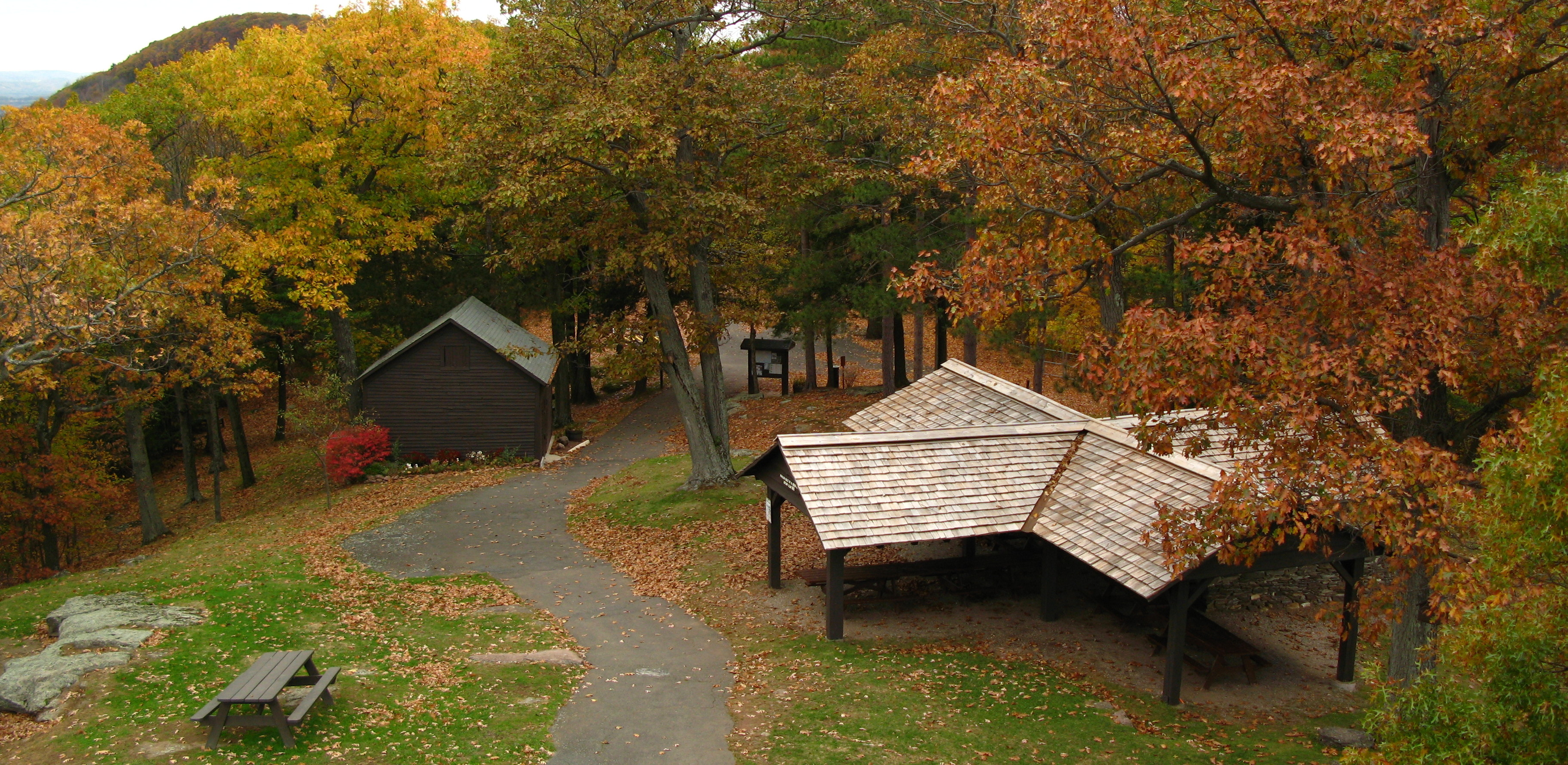
Picnic Grove on Mt Sugarloaf, South Deerfield MA

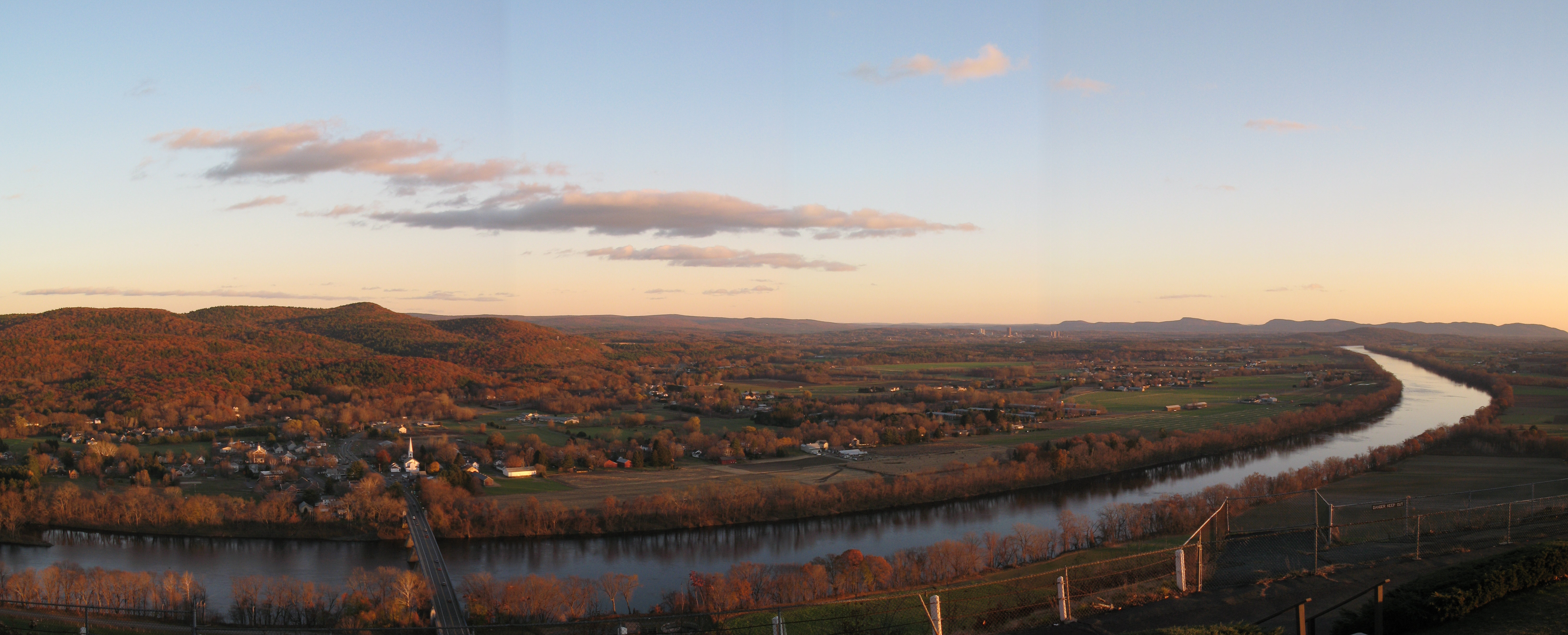
View of the Connecticut River and the Pioneer Valley looking East South East from Mt Sugarloaf in South Deerfield MA.

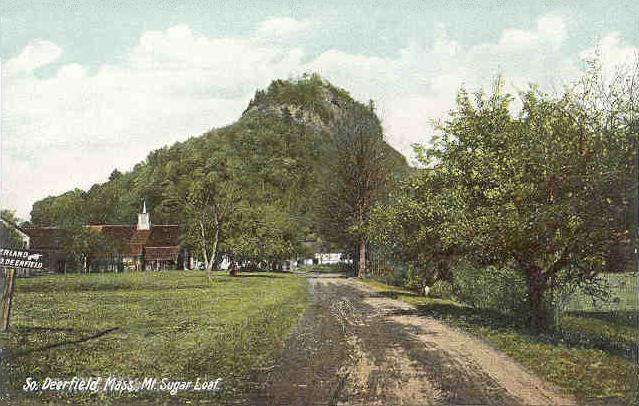
South Sugarloaf. 1910 postcard.

== See also ==
- Mount Sugarloaf and Sugarloaf Mountain are also the names of numerous other hills and mountains worldwide. Several nearby mountains with the name "Sugarloaf" are located in Maine, Vermont, New Hampshire, and Connecticut.
