= Joseph S. Freedman =

Joseph S. Freedman (born 1946) is Professor of History at Alabama State University in Montgomery, Alabama. He has been an Assistant (2000-2005), Associate (2005-2008), and Full Professor (2008-2012) of Education there. Since 2012, he has been a Full Professor of History there. His primary area of research is academic philosophy (Schulphilosophie) during the Early Modern Period with an emphasis on Central Europe. He publishes extensively on the history of philosophy and history of education. Freedman received his BA in History 1969, his MA in History in 1972, and his PhD in History in 1982, all from the University of Wisconsin–Madison. His PhD dissertation focused on philosophy and philosophical issues in historical perspective, together with the history of education.

He was also trained as a librarian and an archivist, earning a Master of Information and Library Science (University of Michigan, 1990). Freedman received his BA in History in 1969, his MA in History in 1972, and his PhD in History in 1982, all from the University of Wisconsin–Madison. He has worked since 2005 in the information field as a librarian, library manager, and university archivist. His secondary areas of research are archival theory from the 16th through the 19th centuries and subject-classifications during the early modern period.

Freedman has been a visiting professor at the Universities of Halle-Wittenberg (2004), Munich (2006), and Coimbra (2009). He has also given lectures at the Universities of Basel, Bern, Copenhagen, Halle-Wittenberg, Leipzig, Salzburg, and Tübingen as well as at Trinity College, Dublin. He was a fellow at the Max-Planck Institute for Legal History (2002), the Scaliger Institute at the University of Leiden (2003, 2004), the Johannes a Lasco Bibliothek in Emden (2005), the Berlin State Library (2011), and the Herzog August Bibliothek Wolfenbüttel (2012, 2013). He was also an Honorary Fellow at the Historisches Kolleg in Munich in 2014.

== Selected publications ==
- The Life, Significance, and Philosophy of Clemens Timpler, 1563/4–1624. Madison: University of Wisconsin. 1982. (3 volumes: unpublished PhD dissertation)
- European Academic Philosophy in the Late Sixteenth and Early Seventeenth Centuries: The Life, Significance, and Philosophy of Clemens Timpler (1563/4–1624). Hildesheim: Georg Olms. 1988. ISBN 9783487090139. (2 volumes)
- Philosophy and the Arts in Central Europe, 1500–1700: Teaching and Texts at Schools and Universities. Aldershot: Ashgate. 1999. ISBN 0-86078-780-X. (Collection of previously published essays)

== Selected articles ==
- "Aristotelianism and Humanism in the Late Reformation German Philosophy: The case of Clemens Timpler" in The Harvest of Humanism in Central Europe: Essays in Honor of Lewis W. Spitz, Fleischer, Manfred P., ed. St. Louis: Concordia Publishing House, 1992.
- "Classifications of Philosophy, the Sciences, and the Arts in Sixteenth- and Seventeenth-Century Europe" in The Modern Schoolman, St. Louis University, 1994, p. 37ff.
- Freedman, Joseph S. (2001). ""Professionalization" and "Confessionalization": The Place of Physics, Philosophy, and Arts Instruction at Central European Academic Institutions during the Reformation Era". Early Science and Medicine. 6 (4): 334–352. doi:10.1163/157338201x00181. JSTOR 4130320. PMID 11873784.
- "Melancthon's Opinion of Ramus and the Utilization of Their Writings in Central Europe" in The Influence of Petrus Ramus: Studies in sixteenth and seventeenth century philosophy and sciences, Feingold, Mordechai, Freedman, Joseph S., and Rother, Wolfgang, eds. Schwabe, 2001. ISBN 3-7965-1560-6
- "A Neglected Treatise on Scientific Method (methodus scientifica) Published by Johannes Bellarinus in 1606" in Geschiche Der Hermeneutik Und Die Methodik Der Textinterpretierenden Disziplinen, Schonert, Jorg and Vollhardt, Freidrich, eds. Walter de Gruyter, 2005, p. 43ff. ISBN 3-11-018303-X
