= Mount Sugarloaf State Reservation =

State park in Massachusetts, United States

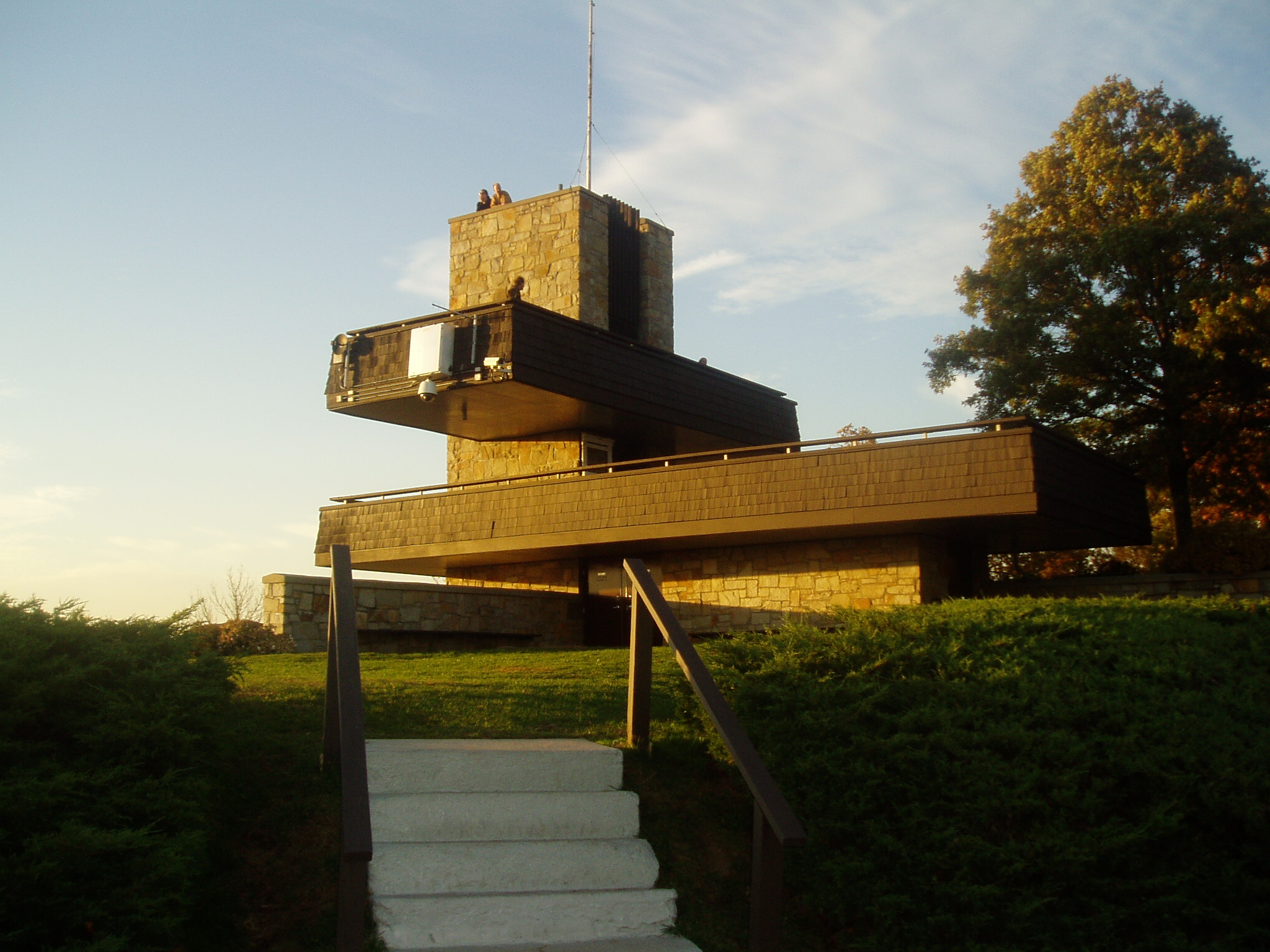
- Sugarloaf Observation Tower

- Location within Massachusetts Location within the United States
- Location: Deerfield, Massachusetts, United States
- Coordinates: 42°28′12″N 72°35′32″W
- Area: 533 acres (216 ha)
- Elevation: 643 ft (196 m)
- Administrator: Massachusetts Department of Conservation and Recreation
- Website: Official website

Mount Sugarloaf State Reservation is a state-owned public recreation area managed by the Massachusetts Department of Conservation and Recreation located in South Deerfield, just west of the Connecticut River. The state park includes the summits of North Sugarloaf Mountain and South Sugarloaf Mountain, as well as 1.75 miles of frontage on the Connecticut River and two river islands. The park is part of a larger park designation called the Connecticut River Greenway State Park. Portions of the park property along the river are used by the University of Massachusetts Amherst for agricultural research.

== Activities and amenities ==
The state maintains an automobile road and an observation tower on South Sugarloaf, open from late spring through the fall foliage season. The reservation is accessible via Route 116. Parking for a fee is available at the base of the mountain and at the summit of the auto road. The reservation is open for hiking, picnicking, and scenic viewing. Hiking trails include a section of the 20-mile Pocumtuck Ridge Trail. Canoe and kayak camping is allowed on the islands.
