= Poet's Seat Tower =

Coordinates: 42.5946°N 72.5865°W

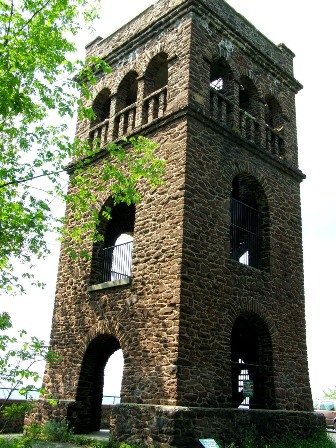
Poet's Seat Tower on Rocky Mountain, Greenfield, Mass.

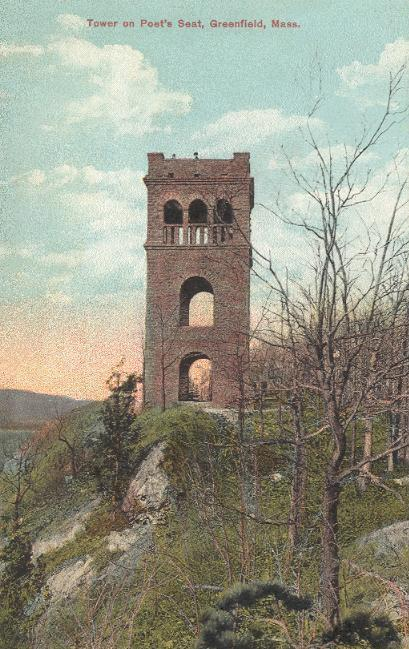
Poet's Seat Tower on Rocky Mountain, northern Pocumtuck Range. 1915 postcard.

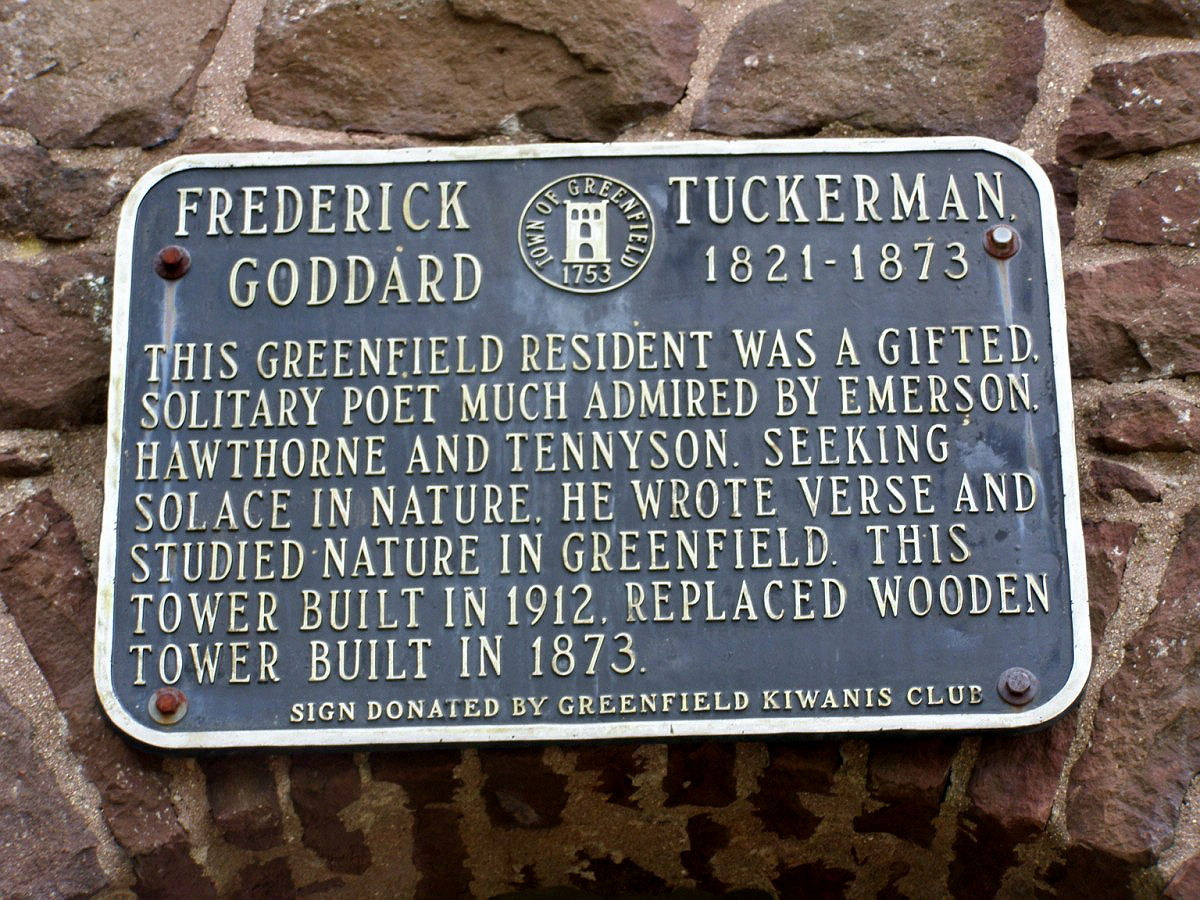
Commemorative Plaque at Poet's Seat Tower in Greenfield, Massachusetts

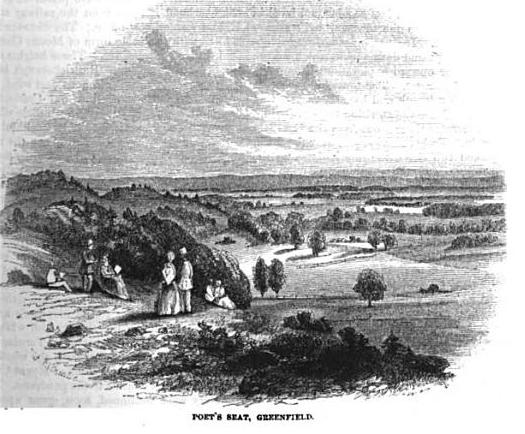
Illustration from November 1856 Harper's New Monthly Magazine

Poet's Seat Tower is a 1912 sandstone observation tower, located in Greenfield, Massachusetts. It was so named to honor a long tradition of poets being drawn to the spot, in particular, the local poet Frederick Goddard Tuckerman. By 1850, the location was referred to as "Poet's Seat" by Tuckerman in a surviving herbarium entry for November 10 of that year.

An earlier wooden tower was erected at the site on June 3, 1879. This first structure was built, along with a public drinking fountain and a road accessing the site, under the auspices of The Greenfield Rural Club.
