= List of crossings of the Connecticut River =

This is a list of bridges and other crossings of the Connecticut River from its mouth at Long Island Sound upstream to its source at the Connecticut Lakes. The list includes current road and rail crossings, as well as ferries carrying a state highway across the river. Some pedestrian bridges and abandoned bridges are also listed.

== Crossings ==
| Connecticut | Massachusetts | Vermont | New Hampshire |

| Crossing | Carries | Location | Built | Coordinates | Image |
Connecticut
| Amtrak Old Saybrook–Old Lyme Bridge | Amtrak Northeast Corridor | Old Saybrook and Old Lyme | 1907 | 41°18′39″N 72°20′57″W | |
| Raymond E. Baldwin Bridge | I-95 / US 1 | Old Saybrook and Old Lyme | 1948, 1993 | 41°19′09″N 72°20′51″W | |
| Chester–Hadlyme Ferry | Route 148 | Chester and Lyme | 1769 | 41°25′11″N 72°25′50″W | |
| East Haddam Bridge | Route 82 | Haddam and East Haddam | 1913 | 41°27′05″N 72°27′52″W | |
| Middletown–Portland railroad bridge | | Middletown and Portland | | 41°34′00″N 72°38′52″W | |
| Arrigoni Bridge | Route 17 / Route 66 | Middletown and Portland | 1938 | 41°34′09″N 72°38′55″W | |
| Rocky Hill–Glastonbury Ferry | Route 160 | Rocky Hill and Glastonbury | 1655 | 41°39′57″N 72°37′40″W | |
| William H. Putnam Memorial Bridge | Route 3 | Wethersfield and Glastonbury | 1959 | 41°42′51″N 72°38′27″W | |
| Charter Oak Bridge | US 5 / Route 15 | Hartford and East Hartford | 1942, 1991 | 41°45′11″N 72°39′18″W | |
| Founders Bridge | Route 2 | Hartford and East Hartford | 1958 | 41°45′56″N 72°39′55″W | |
| Morgan G. Bulkeley Bridge | I-84 / US 6 / US 44 | Hartford and East Hartford | 1908 (widened 1964) | 41°46′09″N 72°39′54″W | |
| Hartford–East Hartford railroad bridge | | Hartford and East Hartford | c. 1873 | 41°46′35″N 72°39′27″W | |
| Captain John Bissell Memorial Bridge | I-291 and pedestrian/bike path | Windsor and South Windsor | 1957 | 41°48′47″N 72°38′40″W | |
| Dexter Coffin Bridge | I-91 | Windsor Locks and East Windsor | 1959 | 41°55′00″N 72°37′22″W | |
| Bridge Street Bridge | Route 140 | Windsor Locks and East Windsor | 1992 | 41°55′45″N 72°37′27″W | |
| Warehouse Point railroad bridge | Amtrak New Haven–Springfield Line | Suffield and Enfield | 1903 | 41°56′36″N 72°36′50″W | |
| Enfield–Suffield Covered Bridge (destroyed 1900) | | Suffield and Enfield | 1832 | 41°58′30.34″N 72°36′22.31″W | |
| Enfield–Suffield Veterans Bridge | Route 190 | Suffield and Enfield | 1966 | 41°59′23″N 72°36′13″W | |
| Suffield and Thompsonville Bridge (demolished 1971) | | Suffield and Enfield | 1893 | 41°59′57″N 72°36′25.56″W | |
Massachusetts
| Julia B. Buxton Bridge (South End Bridge) | US 5 | Agawam and Springfield | 1954 | 42°04′53″N 72°34′58″W | |
| Memorial Bridge | Route 147 | West Springfield and Springfield | 1922 | 42°05′56″N 72°35′42″W | |
| Old Toll Bridge (demolished) | | West Springfield and Springfield | 1816 | 42°5′59.68″N 72°35′46.47″W | |
| | CSX Berkshire Subdivision | West Springfield and Springfield | 1873 | 42°06′05″N 72°35′57″W | |
| Arthur J. McKenna Bridge (North End Bridge) | US 20 | West Springfield and Springfield | 1924 | 42°06′31″N 72°36′51″W | |
| I-91 bridge | I-91 | West Springfield and Chicopee | 1966 | 42°08′07″N 72°36′55″W | |
| Chicopee – West Springfield Bridge (demolished 1987) | | West Springfield and Chicopee | | 42°8′38.39″N 72°37′7.11″W | |
| Massachusetts Turnpike bridge | I-90 | West Springfield and Chicopee | 1957 | 42°09′14″N 72°37′40″W | |
| Jones Ferry | | Holyoke and Chicopee | | 42°10′18″N 72°37′43″W | |
| I-391 bridge | I-391 | Holyoke and Chicopee | 1979 | 42°11′24″N 72°36′36″W | |
| Willimansett Bridge | Route 116 / Route 141 | Holyoke and Chicopee | 1891, 2015 | 42°11′42″N 72°36′05″W | |
| | Connecticut River Line | Holyoke and Chicopee | | 42°11′43″N 72°36′02″W | |
| Vietnam Memorial Bridge | Route 116 | Holyoke and South Hadley | 1990 | 42°12′42″N 72°35′46″W | |
| Joseph E. Muller Bridge | US 202 | Holyoke and South Hadley | 1958 | 42°12′58″N 72°36′28″W | |
| Northampton Toll Bridge | | Northampton and Hadley | 1808 | 42°20′11″N 72°37′04″W | |
| Calvin Coolidge Bridge | Route 9 | Northampton and Hadley | 1937 | 42°20′11″N 72°37′04″W | |
| Norwottuck Rail Trail Bridge | Norwottuck Rail Trail | Northampton and Hadley | 1887 | 42°20′14″N 72°37′07″W | |
| Hatfield Bridge (dismantled 1823) | | Hatfield and Hadley | 1807 | 42°21′55.44″N 72°35′21.65″W | |
| Sunderland Bridge | Route 116 | Deerfield and Sunderland | 1937 | 42°28′03″N 72°35′06″W | |
| Deerfield–Montague railroad bridge | Fitchburg Route | Deerfield and Montague | | 42°33′44″N 72°33′22″W | |
| Canalside Rail Trail Bridge | | Deerfield and Montague | c. 1880, 1936 | 42°34′45.30″N 72°34′29.53″W | |
| Montague City Covered Bridge (destroyed 1936) | | Greenfield and Montague | | 42°34′49.1″N 72°34′44.9″W (approx.) | |
| Montague trolley bridge (destroyed 1936) | | Greenfield and Montague | | 42°34′49.1″N 72°34′45.9″W (approx.) | |
| General Pierce Bridge | | Greenfield and Montague | 1947 | 42°34′49″N 72°34′47″W | |
| Turners Falls Road Bridge | | Greenfield and Montague | 1936 | 42°36′33″N 72°33′41″W | |
| Gill–Montague Bridge | | Gill and Montague | 1937 | 42°36′40″N 72°33′11″W | |
| French King Bridge | Route 2 | Gill and Erving | 1931 | 42°35′52″N 72°29′48″W | |
| Bennett's Meadow Bridge | Route 10 | Northfield | 1969 | 42°41′00″N 72°28′18″W | |
| Railroad bridge | New England Central Railroad | Northfield | 1903 | 42°42′22.40″N 72°27′33″W | |
| Schell Bridge (closed) | | Northfield | 1903 | 42°42′44″N 72°27′12″W | |
Vermont – New Hampshire
| Rail bridge (demolished) | Boston and Maine Railroad Fort Hill Branch (former) | Vernon and Hinsdale | 1913 | 42.737098°N 72.462587°W | |
| Rail bridge (partially demolished) | Boston and Maine Railroad Cheshire Branch (former) | Brattleboro and Hinsdale | | 42°50′16.38″N 72°32′46.21″W | |
| General John Stark Memorial Bridge | VT 119; NH 119 | Brattleboro and Hinsdale | 2024 | 42.85009°N 72.55185°W | |
| Charles Dana Bridge and the Anna Hunt Marsh Bridge (closed to vehicles) | pedestrians and bicycles (future) | Brattleboro and Hinsdale | 1920 | 42°51′05″N 72°33′10″W | |
| United States Navy Seabees Bridge | VT 9 NH 9 | Brattleboro and Chesterfield | 2003 | 42°53′02″N 72°33′07″W | |
| Route 123 bridge | VT 123; NH 123 | Westminster and Walpole | 1910 | 43°05′04″N 72°26′00″W | |
| Vilas Bridge (closed) | | Bellows Falls and North Walpole | 1930 | 43°08′07″N 72°26′25″W | |
| Stone Arch Bridge | Vermont Rail (Green Mountain) | Bellows Falls and North Walpole | | 43°08′09″N 72°26′25″W | |
| New England Central railroad bridge | | Bellows Falls and North Walpole | | 43°08′17″N 72°26′48″W | |
| Arch Bridge | | Bellows Falls and North Walpole | 1984 | 43°08′17″N 72°26′54″W | |
| Cheshire Bridge | VT 11; NH 11 | Springfield and Charlestown | 1806,1906,1930 | 43°15′37″N 72°25′38″W | |
| Route 12 bridge | VT 12; NH 12 | Ascutney and Claremont | 1969 | 43°24′11″N 72°24′01″W | |
| New England Central railroad bridge | | Windsor and Cornish | | 43°28′11″N 72°23′19″W | |
| Cornish–Windsor Covered Bridge | | Windsor and Cornish | 1866 | 43°28′25″N 72°23′01″W | |
| I-89 bridge | I-89 | Hartford and Lebanon | 1966 | 43°38′03″N 72°19′43″W | |
| Railroad bridge | | White River Junction and West Lebanon | | 43°38′49″N 72°18′48″W | |
| Lyman Bridge | US 4 | White River Junction and West Lebanon | 1936, 2015 | 43°39′02″N 72°18′51″W | |
| Ledyard Bridge | VT 10A; NH 10A | Norwich and Hanover | 1998 | 43°42′13″N 72°17′59″W | |
| Lyme–East Thetford Bridge | VT 113; East Thetford Road | East Thetford and Lyme | 1937 | 43°48′43″N 72°10′59″W | |
| North Thetford Bridge (closed 1959 - destroyed winter 1972/1973) | Bridge Street; North Thetford Road | North Thetford and Lyme | 1822, 1864 | 43°50′32″N 72°10′58″W | |
| Morey Memorial Bridge | VT 25A; NH 25A | Fairlee and Orford | 1937 | 43°54′25″N 72°08′22″W | |
| Piermont Bridge | VT 25; NH 25 | Bradford and Piermont | 1929 | 43°58′40″N 72°06′43″W | |
| Bedell Covered Bridge (destroyed by wind, 1979) | | South Newbury and Haverhill | 1805, 1823, 1862, 1866, 1979 | 44°02′43″N 72°04′27″W | |
| Newbury Crossing Road | | Newbury and Haverhill | 1970 | 44°03′58″N 72°03′05″W | |
| Ranger Bridge | US 302 | Wells River and Woodsville | 1917, 1923 | 44°09′14″N 72°02′27″W | |
| Wells River Bridge (closed) | Boston and Maine Corporation (railroad, upper level), road (lower level, until 1917) | Wells River and Woodsville | 1805, 1853, 1903 | 44°09′15″N 72°02′26″W | |
| Frazier Road bridge | | McIndoe Falls and Monroe | 1937 | 44°15′42″N 72°03′32″W | |
| Barnet Road bridge | | Barnet and Monroe | 1930 | 44°17′13″N 72°03′25″W | |
| I-93 bridge | I-93 | Waterford and Littleton | 1976, 1981 | 44°20′34″N 71°53′27″W | |
| Route 18 bridge | VT 18; NH 18 | Waterford and Littleton | 1934 | 44°20′33″N 71°53′20″W | |
| Whitcomb Bridge | | Gilman and Dalton | 1997 | 44°24′39″N 71°43′23″W | |
| old Whitcomb Bridge | pedestrian traffic only | Gilman and Dalton | 1928 | 44°24′40.34″N 71°43′21.45″W | |
| Twin State railroad bridge | | South Lunenburg and Dalton | 1928 | 44°25′38″N 71°40′35″W | |
| Mount Orne Covered Bridge | | Lunenburg and South Lancaster | 1911 | 44°27′36″N 71°39′10″W | |
| Rogers' Rangers Bridge | US 2 | Guildhall and Lancaster | 2020 | 44°29′46″N 71°35′39″W | |
| Guildhall Road | | Guildhall and Northumberland | 1984 | 44°33′51″N 71°33′31″W | |
| Janice Peaslee Bridge | | Maidstone and Stratford | 1893, 2005 | 44°39′6.69″N 71°33′45″W | |
| St. Lawrence and Atlantic Railroad bridge | | Bloomfield and North Stratford | | 44°45′08″N 71°37′52″W | |
| Route 105 bridge | VT 105 | Bloomfield and North Stratford | 1947 | 44°45′09″N 71°37′50″W | |
| Columbia Bridge | | Lemington and Columbia | 1912 | 44°51′11″N 71°33′05″W | |
| Route 26 bridge | VT 26; NH 26 | Lemington and Colebrook | 1953 | 44°53′56″N 71°30′27″W | |
| Route 114 bridge | VT 114; Main Street | Canaan and West Stewartstown | 1990 | 44°59′45″N 71°32′05″W | |
| Railroad bridge (former) | Baltimore truss bridge once used by Maine Central Railroad and North Stratford Railroad now used by hikers and snowmobilers. | Canaan and West Stewartstown | c. 1903 | 44°59′59.2″N 71°31′45.4″W | |
| Canaan–Stewartstown Bridge | | Beecher Falls and Stewartstown | 1930 | 45°00′28″N 71°30′27″W | |
New Hampshire
| Route 3 bridge | US 3 | Pittsburg and Clarksville | 1931 | 45°01′15″N 71°27′50″W | |
| Pittsburg–Clarksville Covered Bridge (closed 1981) | | Pittsburg and Clarksville | c. 1876 | 45°03′16″N 71°24′25″W | |
| Route 145 bridge | NH 145 | Pittsburg and Clarksville | 2006 | 45°02′57″N 71°23′29″W | |
| Murphy Dam Road | unpaved access road | Pittsburg and Clarksville | 1938 | 45°02′56.5″N 71°22′57.5″W | |
| Forest Access Road | logging traffic | Pittsburg | | 45°04′22″N 71°18′08″W | |
| Magalloway Road | logging traffic | Pittsburg | | 45°07′05″N 71°12′31″W | |
| Scott Brook Road | logging traffic | Pittsburg | | 45°10′54″N 71°10′38″W | |
| Route 3 bridge | US 3 | Pittsburg | 1961 | 45°11′23″N 71°11′24″W | |
