= Suffield and Thompsonville Bridge =

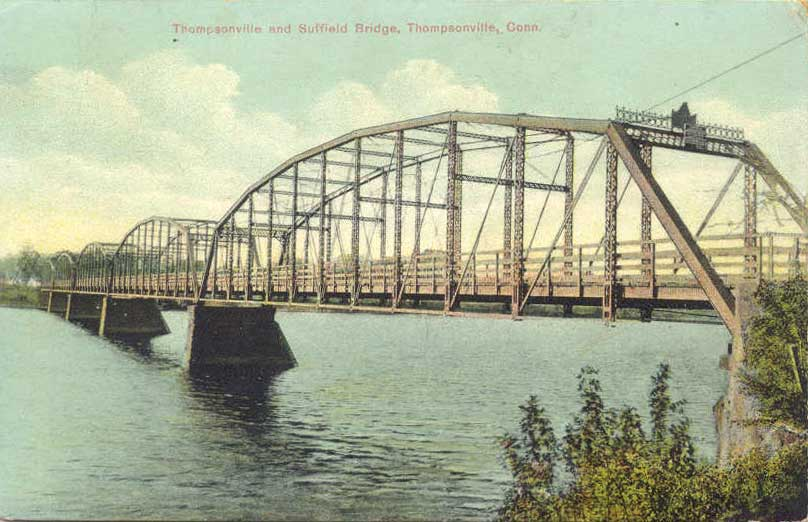
- Coordinates: 41°59′57″N 72°36′25.56″W
- Carries: vehicular and pedestrian traffic
- Crosses: Connecticut River
- Locale: Suffield, Connecticut, to Thompsonville, Connecticut

Characteristics
- Design: 5-span iron through truss bridge
- Total length: 1,060 feet (323 m)

History
- Construction start: August 15, 1892
- Construction end: January 14, 1893
- Opened: February 20, 1893
- Closed: 1971

Statistics
- Toll: 3¢ for pedestrians 12¢ for single teams 15¢ for double teams

Location
- Interactive map of Suffield and Thompsonville Bridge

The Suffield and Thompsonville Bridge was a 5-span iron through truss bridge over the Connecticut River located between present day Suffield, Connecticut, and Thompsonville, Connecticut (Enfield). It connected Burbank Avenue in Suffield with Main Street in Thompsonville. Demolished in 1972, Its four stone piers still stand today.

== History ==
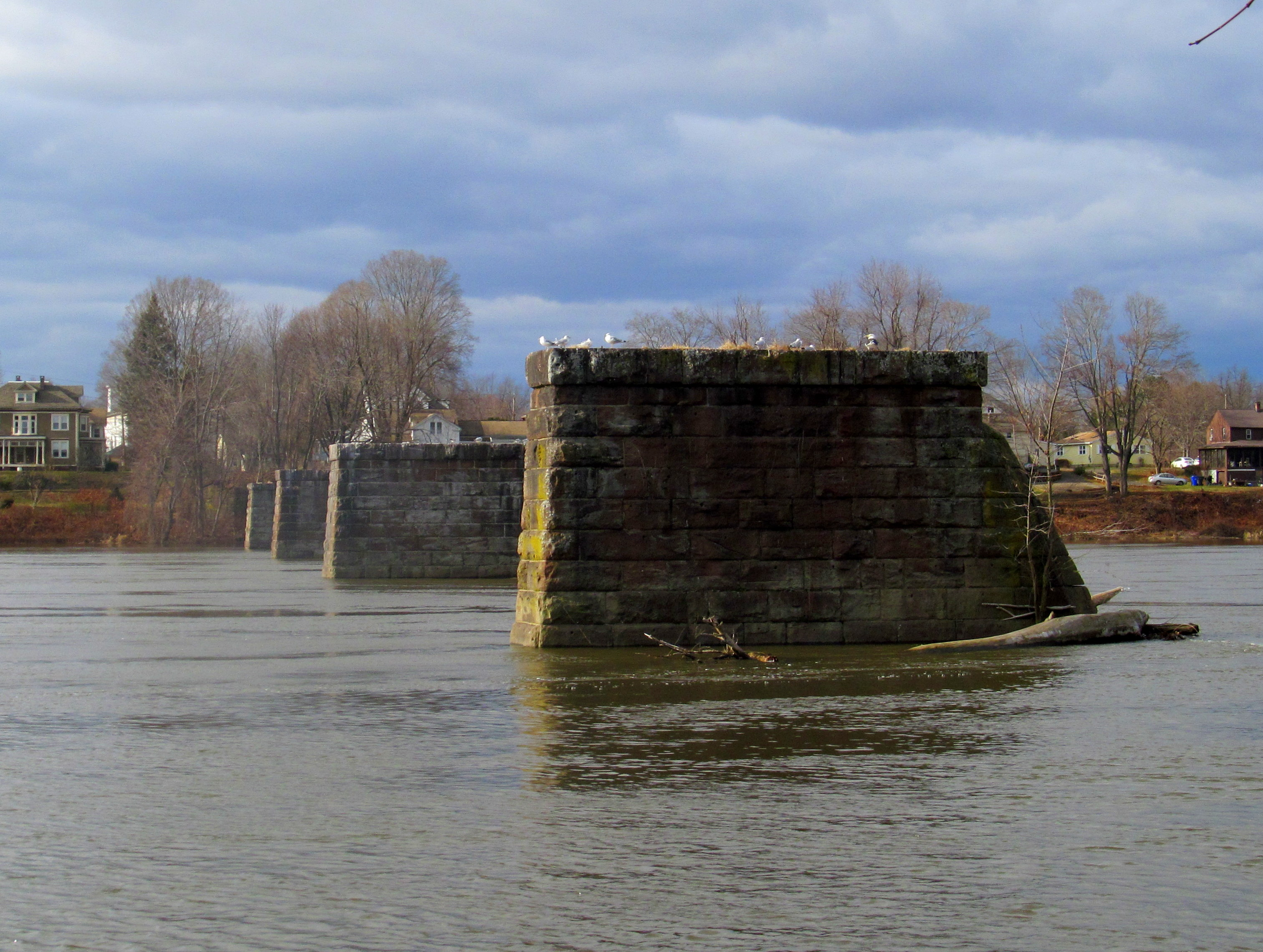
Former bridge piers photographed in 2014

In 1889 the Suffield and Thompsonville Bridge Company was granted a charter to construct an iron bridge across the Connecticut River between Thompsonville and Suffield. The Berlin Iron Bridge Company of Berlin, Connecticut, was the contractor for the ironwork, and O.W. Weand of Reading, Pennsylvania, was the contractor for the stonework. The first toll-taker was Nathan Hemenway. Tolls were initially three cents for pedestrians, twelve cents for single teams and fifteen cents for double teams.

The Enfield–Suffield Veterans Bridge opened downstream in 1966, and the Suffield and Thompsonville Bridge closed shortly thereafter. The ironwork was removed, but the four piers remain in the river.

== See also ==
- List of crossings of the Connecticut River
