= J. R. Montgomery Company Industrial Complex =

- U.S. National Register of Historic Places
- The complex, converted to apartments, in 2026

- Location within Connecticut Location within the United States
- Location: 25 Canal Bank Road; Windsor Locks, Connecticut, US
- Coordinates: 41°55′46″N 72°37′36″W
- Area: 2.28 acres (0.92 ha)
- Built: 1891–1939
- NRHP reference No.: 100001915
- Added to NRHP: December 29, 2017

The J. R. Montgomery Company Industrial Complex is a historic factory complex located on an island between the Enfield Falls Canal and the Connecticut River in Windsor Locks, Connecticut. It is next to the Windsor Locks Canal State Park Trail. The site has been listed on the National Register of Historic Places since 2017.

== Description and history ==
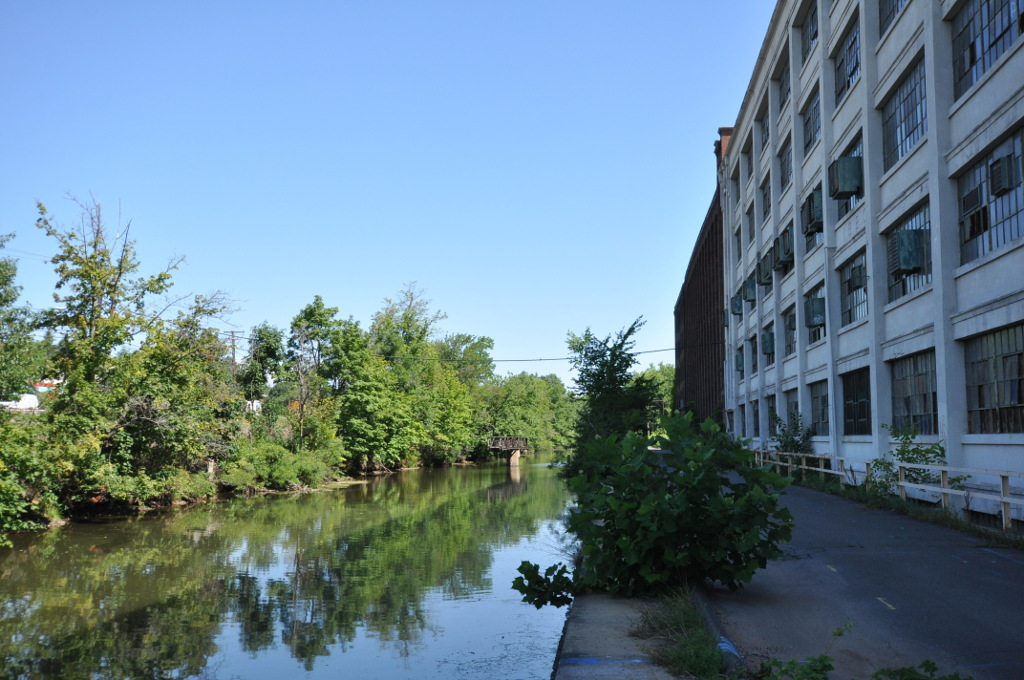
The complex in 2016 before renovations

The complex was built by J. R. Montgomery Company, which was founded in 1871 and moved to the site in 1881. It was once the country's largest manufacturer of tinsels, in addition to weaving cotton warps and yarns. It had a peak of 500 employees circa 1920. It fabricated metallic and plastic threads and wires from the 1920s onward. The metal threads were used in a wide range of manufactured products from electric razors, pacemakers, and computers.

German investors purchased the company and moved its operations to New Hampshire in 1989. The complex cycled through a series of owners and was ultimately abandoned. A devastating fire caused by arson destroyed two buildings in July 2006, followed by other fires in August 2009 and April 2010. The site was blighted and abandoned until 2020, when it was redeveloped into the privately owned Montgomery Mills Apartments.

The site comprises three main buildings. The oldest is a five-story brick building from ca. 1893 at the northern end. In the middle is a five-story brick building from ca. 1904, while the southern building is reinforced concrete constructed ca. 1920. The three buildings are connected. Ten smaller buildings dating from 1864 to 1977 also shared the site on the northern end, but most succumbed to fire and neglect and have been demolished.

== See also ==
- National Register of Historic Places listings in Hartford County, Connecticut
