= Noden-Reed Museum =

Historic house in Connecticut, United States

- David Pinney House and Barn
- U.S. National Register of Historic Places
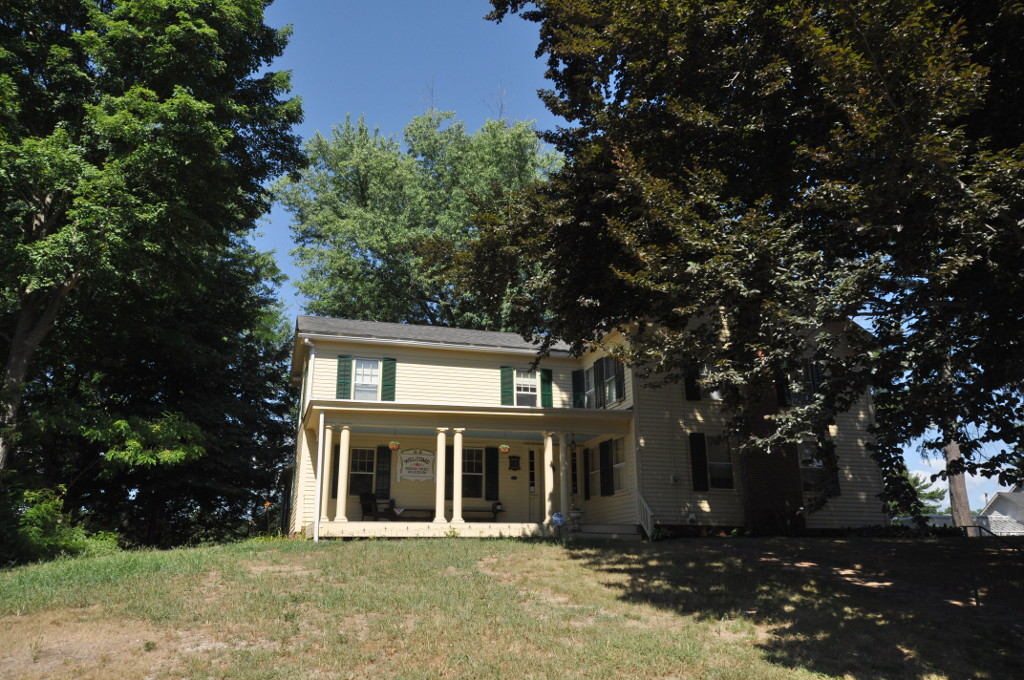

- Location within Connecticut Location within the United States
- Location: 58 West Street, Windsor Locks, Connecticut
- Coordinates: 41°55′57″N 72°38′24″W
- Area: 3 acres (1.2 ha)
- Built: 1840
- NRHP reference No.: 77001415
- Added to NRHP: July 25, 1977

The Noden-Reed Museum is a historic house museum at 58 West Street in Windsor Locks, Connecticut. It includes the David Pinney House and Barn, and is a surviving reminder of the town's agricultural past. It is administered by the local historical society, and is listed on the National Register of Historic Places.

== History ==
The town of Windsor Locks was originally part of Windsor, and was separately incorporated in 1854. Its economic activity was dominated by agriculture, with a boost given by the industrial and transport activity surrounding the Enfield Falls Canal, which allowed freight traffic to bypass rapids on the Connecticut River. David Pinney was a farmer working lands up from the river, about whom little is known. In 1826 he built the brick barn, and in the 1840s he built a Greek Revival house. The choice of brick for the barn was extremely unusual, because it was comparatively expensive for what is normally a utilitarian farm building. His farmlands were donated to the town in 1974 by the Reed family, most of which are now managed as a public park. The house and barn now form a small museum complex on the west side of West Street, managed by the local historical society.

== Architecture ==
The house is an L-shaped wood-frame structure, with a gabled roof and clapboarded exterior. It presents a gabled front on the right, with a recessed ell extending the left. A single-story porch extends across the face of the ell, supported by paired round columns. The house is not of particular architectural distinction. The barn is one of the only such structures known to exist in the state, and has remained in good condition since its construction. It is a two-story structure, covered by a gabled roof topped by a louvered cupola. On its main facade, there are three slightly pointed arch openings, which provide vehicular access to its interior, and there are two pedestrian entrances as well. These are not placed with symmetry or regularity, and are interspersed with a few sash windows. On the interior it is divided into three sections, with stalls for large animals on one side and small animals on the other. It also houses a collection of agricultural implements from a variety of time periods.

== See also ==
- National Register of Historic Places listings in Hartford County, Connecticut
