= Enfield–Suffield Covered Bridge =

Enfield - Suffield Covered Bridge
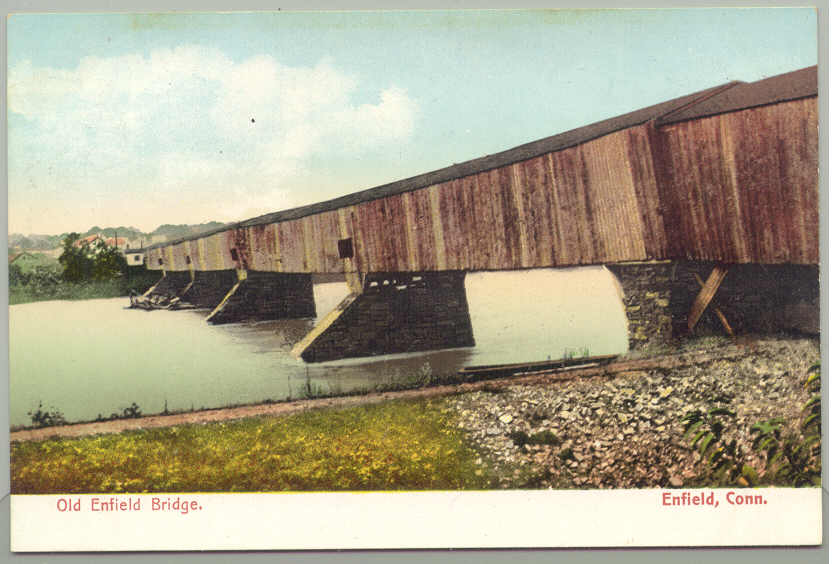
- Coordinates: 41°58′30.34″N 72°36′22.31″W
- Carried: Bridge Lane (Enfield, Connecticut) to Bridge Street (Suffield, Connecticut)
- Crossed: Connecticut River
- Locale: Enfield, Connecticut, to Suffield, Connecticut

Characteristics
- Design: wood covered bridge

History
- Opened: 1821, 1832
- Collapsed: February 15, 1900

The Enfield–Suffield Covered Bridge was a wooden covered bridge over the Connecticut River located between Enfield, Connecticut, and Suffield, Connecticut. The bridge connected Bridge Lane on the Enfield (east) side of the river with Bridge Street on the Suffield side of the river.

Half of the bridge was destroyed in a flood on February 15, 1900. Hosea Keach, agent for the New Haven Railroad at Enfield Bridge station, which was at the entrance to the bridge, was on the bridge when it collapsed. He rode a piece of the span down the river, and climbed to the roof, where he was seen by two railroad employees at the Warehouse Point railroad bridge. They lowered a rope from the railroad bridge as he passed below, rescuing him.

The remains of the bridge were purchased by Southern New England Telephone, which blew up the remaining part of the bridge and used the piers for carrying telephone wires across the river.

== See also ==
- List of crossings of the Connecticut River
