= Mount Orne Covered Bridge =

Mount Orne Bridge
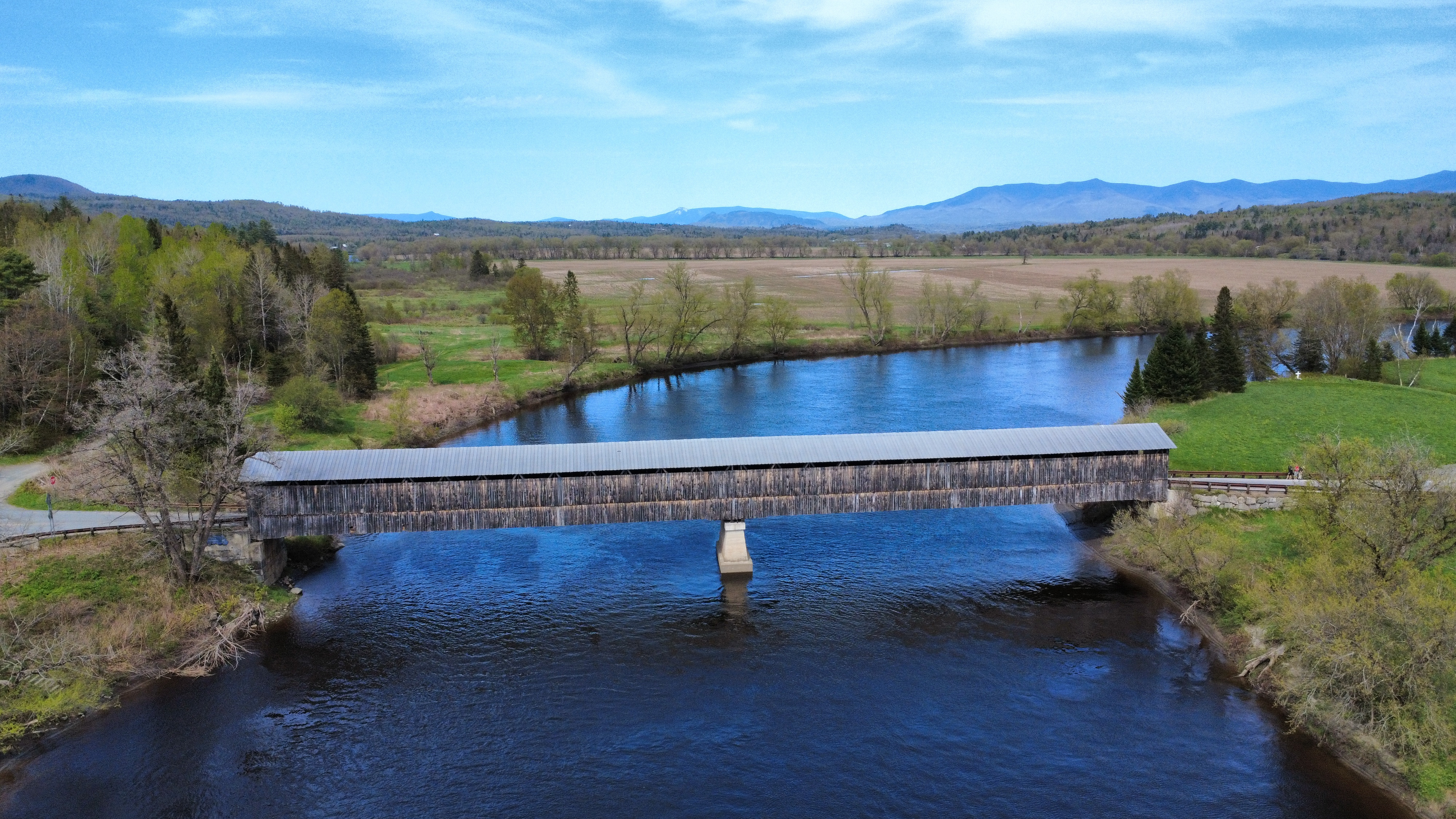
- View of the bridge from the south
- Coordinates: 44°28′N 71°39′W
- Crosses: Connecticut River
- Locale: Lancaster, New Hampshire to Lunenburg, Vermont
- Maintained by: Towns of Lancaster and Lunenburg
- ID number: 29-04-08 (NH #30)

Characteristics
- Design: Howe truss bridge
- Total length: 266.25 ft (81.15 m)
- Width: 20.5 ft (6.2 m)
- Longest span: 127.33 ft (38.81 m)
- Load limit: 6 tons
- Clearance above: 12.75 ft (3.89 m)

History
- Opened: 1911
- Closed
- Mount Orne Covered Bridge
- U.S. National Register of Historic Places
- Location within New Hampshire Location within the United States
- Location: Lancaster, New Hampshire & Lunenburg, Vermont
- Coordinates: 44°27′36″N 71°39′10″W
- Area: 1 acre (0.40 ha)
- Architect: Berlin Iron Bridge Co.
- Architectural style: Howe truss covered bridge
- NRHP reference No.: 76000124
- Added to NRHP: December 12, 1976

The Mount Orne Bridge is a covered bridge over the Connecticut River between Lancaster, New Hampshire, and Lunenburg, Vermont. It joins Elm Street (New Hampshire Route 135) in South Lancaster with River Road (Town Highway 1) in Lunenburg. Built in 1911, it is one of two Howe truss bridges across the Connecticut River. It was listed on the National Register of Historic Places in 1976.

== Description and history ==
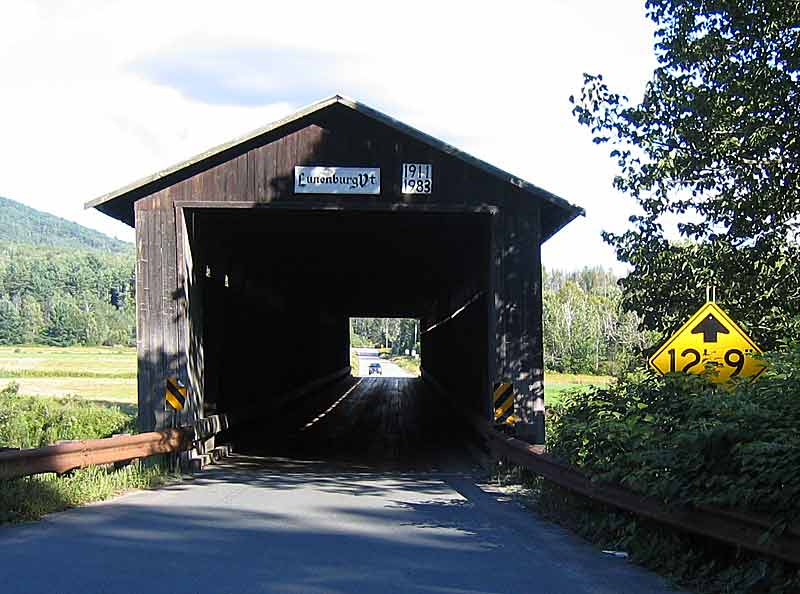
View of the bridge's entrance from the west

The Mount Orne Covered Bridge is located in a rural area of eastern Lunenburg and southwestern Lancaster. It spans the Connecticut River in a roughly northwest-southeast orientation. It consists of two spans of wood-and-iron Howe trusses, resting on stone abutments and piers which have been partially faced in concrete. The overall length of the bridge is 267 feet (81 m), with the western span measuring 134 feet (41 m) and the eastern span one foot (0.30 m) less. The bridge has an overall width of 20.5 feet (6.2 m), with a roadway of 15.5 feet (4.7 m). The bridge is covered by a corrugated metal gable roof, and is sided in vertical boarding that extends only partway to the eaves. The siding extends around to the insides of the portals.

The bridge was built in 1911 by the Berlin Construction Company, replacing one that was washed away by flooding in 1905. It is one of only two Howe truss bridges over the Connecticut River; the other, the Columbia Bridge, was built in 1912. The two bridges are among the last to be built during the historic period of covered bridge construction in either state. The costs of construction and maintenance are shared by the two towns.

In 1983, the bridge temporarily closed on July 5 for repair work; it was reopened and rededicated on November 23.

In November 2023, the bridge was closed (for an as yet undetermined amount of time) due to damage caused by an oversized vehicle driving through it.

== See also ==
- List of crossings of the Connecticut River
- List of covered bridges in Vermont
- List of covered bridges in New Hampshire
- List of bridges on the National Register of Historic Places in Vermont
- List of bridges on the National Register of Historic Places in New Hampshire
- National Register of Historic Places listings in Essex County, Vermont
- National Register of Historic Places listings in Coös County, New Hampshire
