= Vanasse Hangen Brustlin, Inc. =

American civil engineering consulting firm

Vanasse Hangen Brustlin, Inc. (VHB)
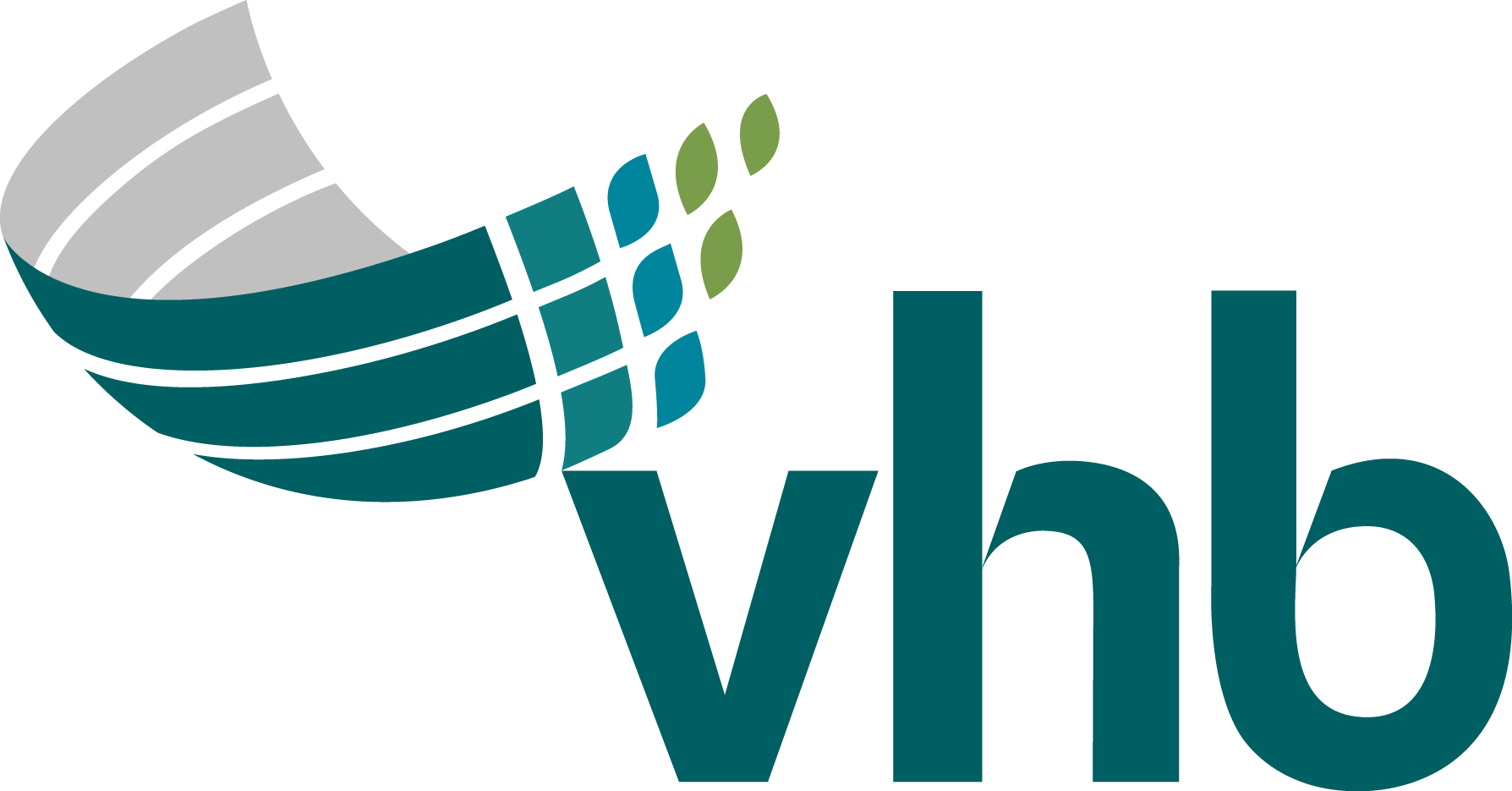
- Type: Private
- Industry: Civil Engineering
- Founded: 1978
- Founder: Bob Vanasse; Rich Hangen; Robert S. Brustlin; William J. Roache; John Kennedy; James D'Angelo
- Headquarters: Watertown, Massachusetts, United States
- Area served: Eastern Seaboard
- Key people: Mike Carragher (CEO)
- Number of employees: 1,600 (Jan. 2020)
- Website: www.vhb.com

Vanasse Hangen Brustlin, Inc. or VHB is a multidisciplinary American civil engineering consulting and design firm headquartered in Watertown, Massachusetts with offices throughout the country. The company was founded in 1979 by Bob Vanasse (1979 – 1990), Rich Hangen (1979 – retirement), Robert S. Brustlin (1979 – retirement), William J. Roache (1979 – retirement), John Kennedy (1979 – retirement) and James D'Angelo (1979 – 2001). The company primarily focuses on transportation and land development. VHB was a finalist in the US DOT Safety Visualization Challenge. VHB works on a variety of transportation engineering projects in the Northeast and along the east coast.

VHB was the lead designer and project manager for the Massachusetts Bay Transportation Authority's South Coast Rail project. In 2018, VHB received a Bronze Engineering Excellence Award from the American Council of Engineering Companies for their work on South Coast Rail bridges. VHB also is developing the permitting and environmental review for the Brooklyn–Queens Connector.

VHB also worked on the rebuild of the Washington Bridge in Providence; a company engineer spotted the sheared pins that results in an emergency closure in December 2023.

== Expansions ==
In 2009 VHB opened an office in Albany, New York. In 2010 VHB acquired New York- based Saccardi & Schiff and Orlando-based MSCW. In 2011 VHB acquired New York–based Eng-Wong, Taub & Associates. In 2012 VHB opened an office in South Portland, Maine. In 2013 VHB acquired Raleigh–based Martin/Alexiou/Bryson. In 2015 VHB acquired Orlando-based GMB Engineers & Planners Inc. In 2019 VHB acquired Burlington-based The Johnson Company.

== Awards ==
In 2018 VHB ranked 69th on the Engineering News-Record ranking of the Top Design Firms. In 2019 they ranked 62nd. In the Engineering News-Record 2019 top design firms by sector, VHB ranked #5 in Massachusetts, No. 3 in New Hampshire, No. 2 in Rhode Island and No. 1 in Vermont.

In 2018 VHB was named as the Women in Transportation Employer of the Year.

== See also ==
- Norwottuck Rail Trail Bridge
