= Arrigoni Bridge =

Bridge in Middlesex County, Connecticut

Charles J. Arrigoni Bridge
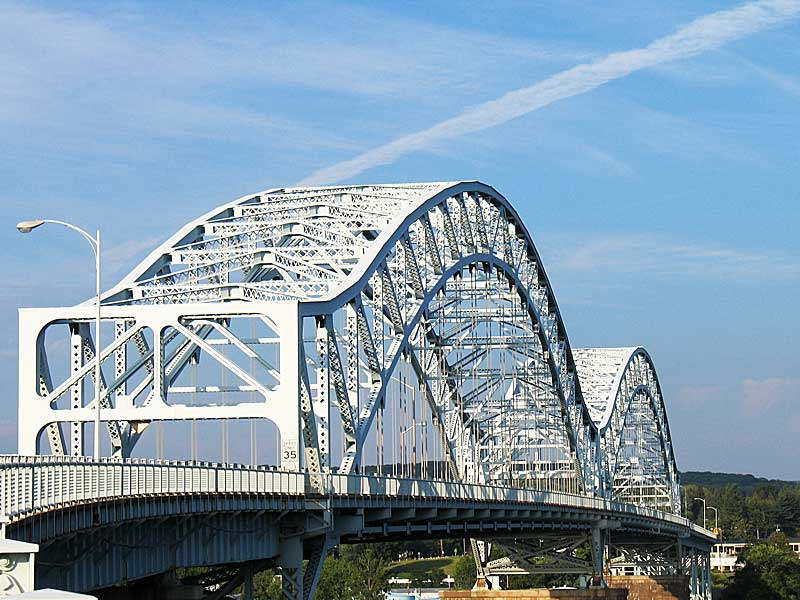
- Coordinates: 41°34′09″N 72°38′55″W
- Carries: 4 lanes of Route 17 / Route 66
- Crosses: Connecticut River and Route 9
- Locale: Middletown and Portland, Connecticut
- Maintained by: Connecticut Department of Transportation

Characteristics
- Design: Through arch bridge
- Total length: 3428.1 ft (1044.85 m)
- Width: 44.9 ft (13.7 m)
- Longest span: 2 × 660 feet (200 m)
- Clearance below: 89 ft (27.1 m)

History
- Construction start: 1936
- Construction end: 1938
- Opened: August 6, 1938

Statistics
- Daily traffic: 33,600

Location
- Interactive map of Charles J. Arrigoni Bridge

The Arrigoni Bridge, also known locally as the Portland Bridge, is a steel through arch bridge carrying Route 17 and Route 66 across the Connecticut River, connecting Middletown, Connecticut, to Portland, Connecticut. When it opened in 1938, the 1,200-foot (370 m) bridge was the most expensive bridge ever built in Connecticut, at a cost of $3.5 million. Its two distinctive 600-foot (180 m) steel arches have the longest span length of any bridge in the state. The bridge has an average daily traffic of 33,600.

It was named after state legislator Charles J. Arrigoni, who promoted the project. Arrigoni served in the Connecticut House of Representatives from 1933 to 1936 and in the Connecticut State Senate from 1937 to 1940.

== History ==
Portland and East Hampton, jointly known as Chatham until Portland separated in 1841, were originally part of the vast settlement of Middletown in 1652. Middletown families settled the towns east of the Connecticut River, and until the latter half of the 19th century, the only way to cross the river was via ferry. The first ferry service in Middletown began operation in 1726. The first bridge spanning the Connecticut River at Middletown was a swing truss bridge opened in 1872, carrying the New York, New Haven and Hartford Railroad. Still in active service, it is now known as the Providence & Worcester railroad bridge.

When the first non-railroad bridge in the area opened in 1896, it was said to be the longest highway drawbridge in the world at the time. Known as the Portland Passenger Bridge, it was built by the Berlin Iron Bridge Company for $180,000, and measured 1,300 feet (400 m) in length and had a draw span of 450 feet (140 m). It provided a roadway and an electric passenger car, accommodated foot traffic, and charged tolls for the crossing. The Portland Passenger Bridge was heavily damaged by flooding in 1936.

=== A new bridge ===
As motor traffic increased in the early 1900s, drivers clamored for a way to cross the river without being interrupted to let marine traffic pass through. Studies for a new bridge date back to at least 1933, when the state was calling it the Route 346 Bridge.

Construction on a new bridge began in 1936. Once the Arrigoni Bridge was completed in 1938, the old drawbridge was demolished. That same year, the Arrigoni Bridge won the American Institute of Steel Construction's first prize of "Most Beautiful Steel Bridge" in the large bridge category.

The choice of large steel through arches for this location, with the roadway suspended from the arches by cables, allowed wide navigation channels on the river, minimized pier construction, and provided a profile to the bridge that was aesthetically pleasing. By replacing the old drawbridge with a high-level crossing (the bridge provides more than 90 feet [27 m] of clearance above the river), the Arrigoni Bridge foreshadowed subsequent major highway crossings of Connecticut's navigable rivers.

From a technical standpoint, the bridge exemplifies the long-span bridge engineering of the first half of the 20th century. Because of the growing need to provide uninterrupted highway passage over large bodies of water, engineers increasingly were called upon to design large cantilevered trusses, suspension bridges, and steel arches. Innovative erection methods, the availability of very large structural components, and special metals all contributed to the development of long-span bridge technology. For example, nearly a third of the Arrigoni Bridge utilized high-strength silicon steel, and the bridge was almost entirely erected by building the arches outward from the center pier, letting them balance each other as they were extended over the water. Another notable engineering feature are the chains of huge eyebars under the roadway that tie together the ends of each arch; the tied-arch technique resists the outward horizontal thrust of the arches and thus allowed the piers to be much smaller and more economical.

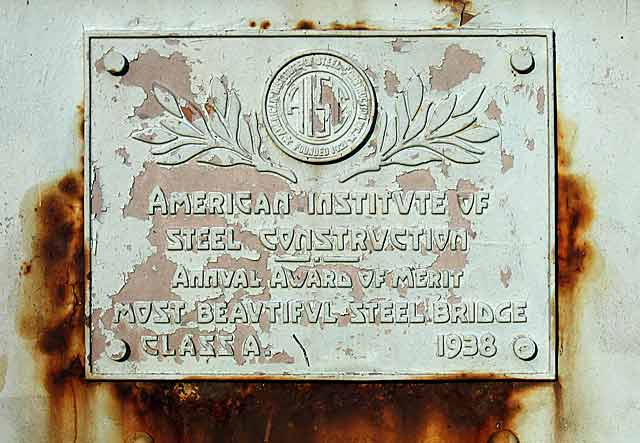
Award plaque

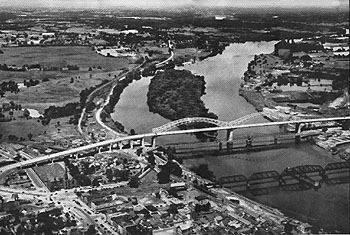
From a commemorative booklet entitled "The Middletown-Portland Bridge" August 6, 1938. Click the image for the accompanying text.

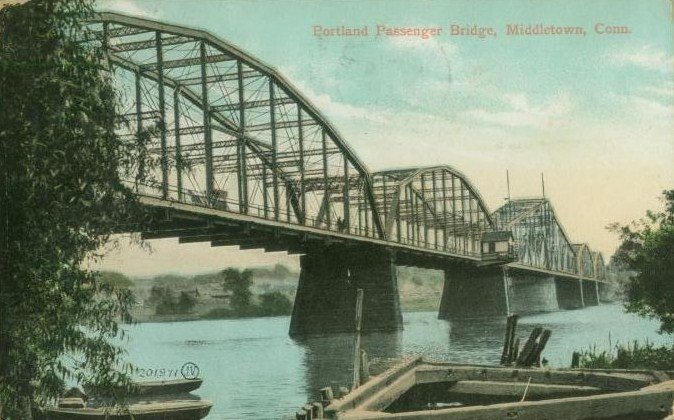
Portland Passenger Bridge over the Connecticut River; no longer in existence

== See also ==
- List of crossings of the Connecticut River
- French King Bridge—French King Bridge won the same award six years earlier
