= Hartford–East Hartford railroad bridge =

Railroad bridge in Hartford, Connecticut

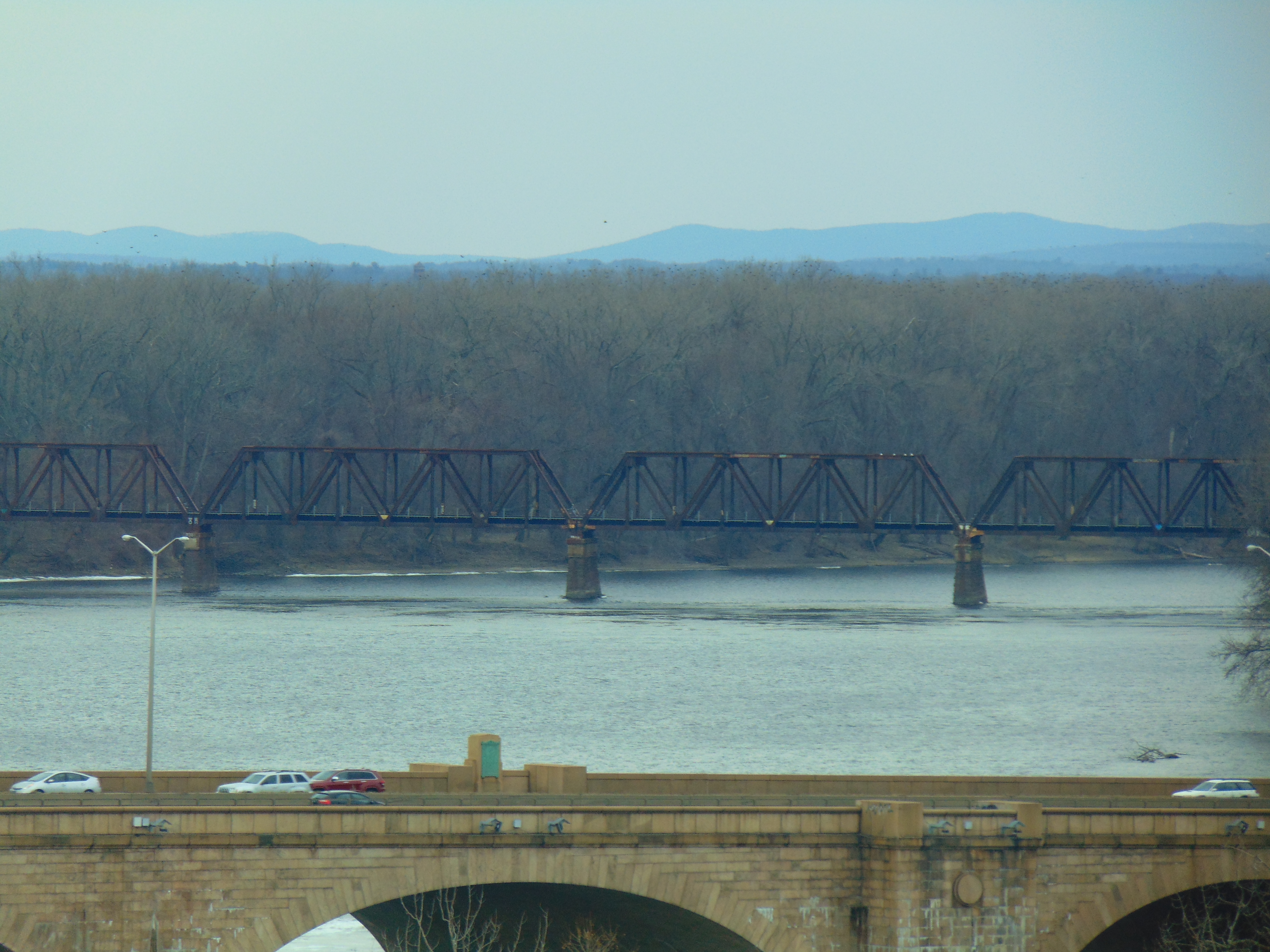
- The bridge going over the Connecticut River
- Coordinates: 41°46′35″N 72°39′27″W
- Carries: Rail traffic
- Crosses: Connecticut River
- Locale: Hartford, Connecticut
- Maintained by: CSO

Characteristics
- Design: truss bridge
- Clearance below: 28 ft (8.5 m)

Rail characteristics
- No. of tracks: 1

Location
- Interactive map of Hartford–East Hartford railroad bridge

The Hartford–East Hartford railroad bridge is a 5-span truss bridge connecting Hartford and East Hartford, Connecticut, over the Connecticut River. The bridge is 1,240 feet in length and 18.3 feet in width and was built ca. 1873 by the Hartford, Providence and Fishkill Railroad. The bridge is currently owned and maintained by the Connecticut Southern Railroad and carries freight traffic.

== History ==
Between 1916 and 1917, the New York, New Haven and Hartford Railroad strengthened the bridge to carry heavier locomotives and trains. The railroad added more abutments, reinforced the structural elements, and also added a second track.

The bridge was the scene of a fatal accident in 1925, when two work trains collided, resulting in the death of one railroad employee.

Due to the 1936 Northeast Flood, the bridge was temporarily taken out of service to assess potential damage. A pile of debris 500 feet long and 300 feet wide was caught under the bridge, requiring it be cleared before the bridge could be inspected and reopened. Until the bridge could be reopened, passenger service across the bridge was replaced by busses.

Following a request from the Connecticut Southern Railroad, in 2011 the state of Connecticut pledged $3 million to support repairs of the bridge, with the Connecticut Southern paying the remaining $1 million.

From Hartford side, looking towards East Hartford

== See also ==
- List of crossings of the Connecticut River
