= Ranger Bridge =

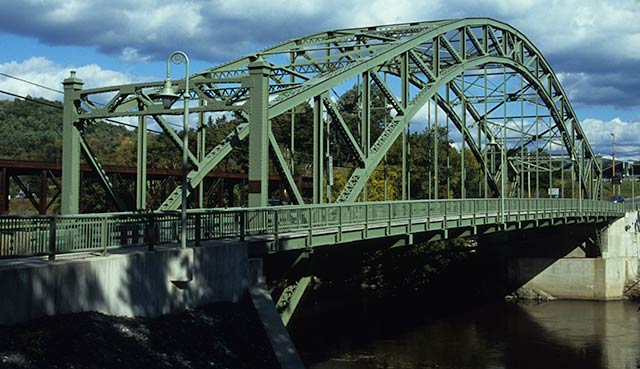
- Ranger Bridge in 2007
- Coordinates: 44°09′14″N 72°02′27″W
- Carries: US 302
- Crosses: Connecticut River
- Locale: between Woodsville, New Hampshire and Wells River, Vermont
- Official name: Veterans Memorial Bridge

Characteristics
- Design: steel three-hinged arch truss
- Total length: 259 feet (79 m)

History
- Designer: John W. Storrs (1917 bridge); J. R. Worcester (1923 bridge)
- Constructed by: Boston Bridge Company (1923 bridge)
- Construction end: 1917, 1923, 2003 rehab

The Ranger Bridge (officially Veterans Memorial Bridge) between Wells River, Vermont and Woodsville, New Hampshire, is a three-hinged steel arch truss bridge over the Connecticut River. It was built in 1923 to replace a 1917 bridge and is the oldest steel arch bridge over the Connecticut River.

== History ==
The Wells River Bridge was built in 1903 to carry rail and road traffic. In 1917, the road traffic was rerouted over a new bridge, a three-span Warren deck truss designed by John W. Storrs, just downstream, called the Ranger Bridge, for around $65,000 (US$1,600,000 with inflation). A flood undermined and destroyed this bridge in 1922.

J. R. Worcester designed the next bridge, which was built by the Boston Bridge Company, the same combination of designer and builder which made the Arch Bridge in Bellows Falls 18 years earlier. The current bridge was completed in 1923 as a three-hinged steel arch bridge. It was rehabilitated in 2001–3.

== See also ==
- List of crossings of the Connecticut River
