= Adino Nye Bell =

American politician

Adino Nye Bell (February 3, 1866 – October 26, 1956) was a Democratic politician who was elected to serve in the Vermont House of Representatives for five terms. He was elected in 1910, 1940, 1948, 1950, and 1952 from the town of Lunenburg, Essex County, Vermont.

He's life of community service included serving as the town's auditor for seventeen years between 1903 and 1933, school director from 1905 to 1908 and again from 1910 to 1913; justice of the peace 1910 to 1950; selectman 1926 to 1929; and town agent from 1941 to 1950.

During World War II he served as the chairman of the Essex County Rationing Board from 1942 to 1945.
