= Lunenburg (CDP), Vermont =

Census-designated place in Vermont, United States

Lunenburg, Vermont
- Census-designated place
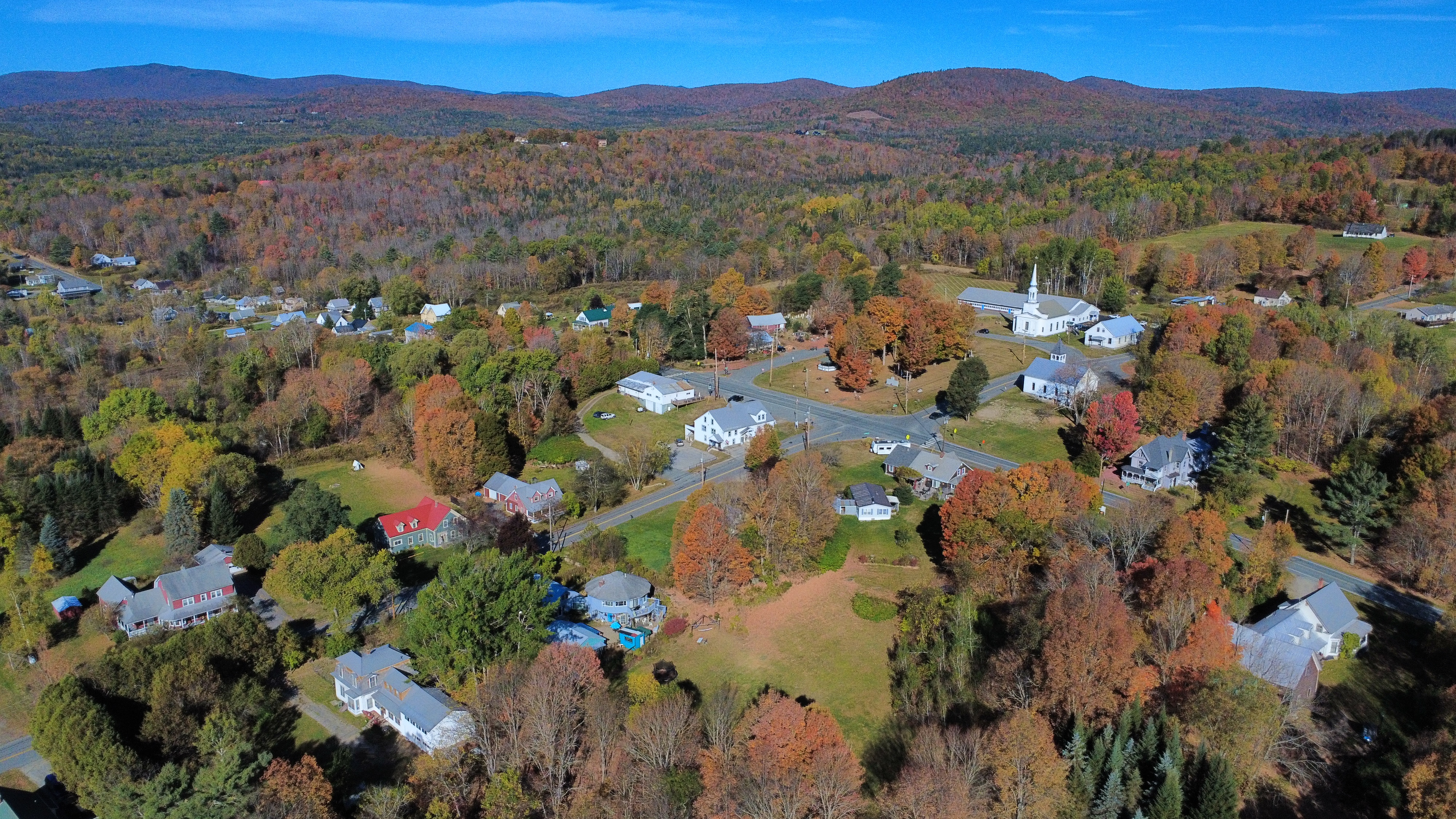
- Lunenburg, VT, from the southeast

- Location within Vermont Location within the United States
- Coordinates: 44°27′25″N 71°40′49″W
- Country: United States
- State: Vermont
- County: Essex
- Town: Lunenburg

Area
  - Total: 2.54 sq mi (6.58 km^{2})
  - Land: 2.54 sq mi (6.57 km^{2})
  - Water: 0 sq mi (0.0 km^{2})
- Elevation: 1,043 ft (318 m)

Population (2020)
  - Total: 234
- Time zone: UTC-5 (Eastern (EST))
  - Summer (DST): UTC-4 (EDT)
- ZIP Code: 05906
- Area code: 802
- FIPS code: 50-41350
- GNIS feature ID: 2805702

Lunenburg is the primary village and a census-designated place (CDP) in the town of Lunenburg, Essex County, Vermont, United States. It was first listed as a CDP prior to the 2020 census.

The CDP is in southern Essex County, in the southeast part of the town of Lunenburg. U.S. Route 2 passes through the village center, leading west 21 miles (34 km) to St. Johnsbury and east 7 miles (11 km) to Lancaster, New Hampshire.
