= Norwottuck Rail Trail Bridge =

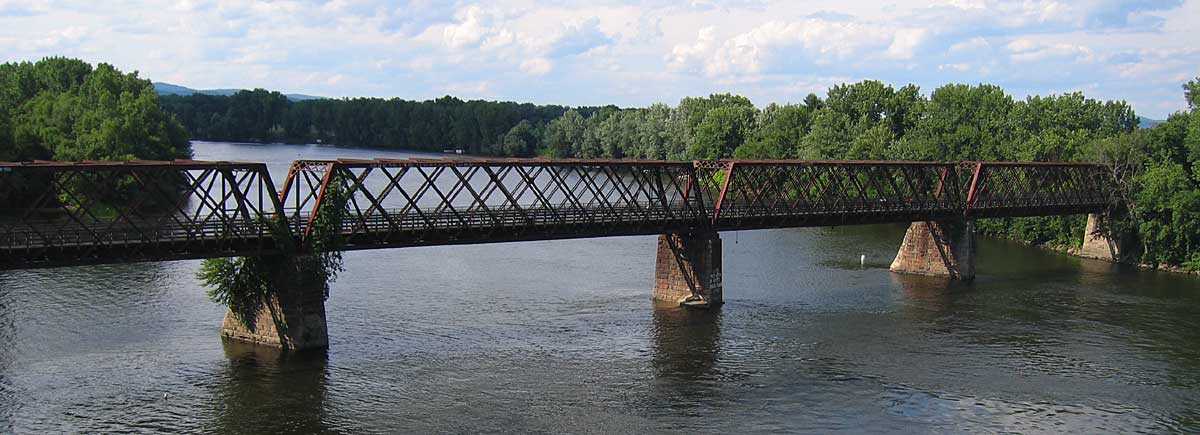
- Coordinates: 42°20′14″N 72°37′07″W
- Carries: Norwottuck Rail Trail
- Crosses: Connecticut River
- Locale: Northampton, Massachusetts to Hadley, Massachusetts
- Maintained by: MassDOT

Characteristics
- Design: steel lattice truss bridge
- Total length: approximately 1,492 feet (454.76 m)
- Longest span: approximately 200 feet (61 m)

History
- Opened: 1887, 1992

Location
- Interactive map of Norwottuck Rail Trail Bridge

The Norwottuck Rail Trail Bridge (also known as the Northampton Lattice Truss Bridge) is a former crossing of the Central Massachusetts Railroad over the Connecticut River in western Massachusetts. Connecting the towns of Northampton and Hadley by the Norwottuck Branch of the Mass Central Rail Trail, it is an eight-span steel lattice truss bridge used by bicycle and foot traffic. With two spans, it crosses but does not provide access to Elwell Island.

== History ==
Work on the bridge originally began with the Massachusetts Central Railroad in 1872, awarded to contractor John R. Smith of Springfield Massachusetts. Construction was long troubled, first as the Panic of 1873 halted construction of the bridge and the entire railroad from Northampton to Waltham, and in 1877 a heavy windstorm blew the unfinished framework of the bridge off the piers into the Connecticut River. The Massachusetts Central Railroad had a grand opening running trains between Hudson and Boston in 1881, but train service only reached as far west Jefferson before operations ended in 1883. The ruined bridge stood until 1887, when it was finally completed under the successor Central Massachusetts Railroad, which began service between Northampton and Boston the same year. It was built by the R. F. Hawkins Ironworks Company.

The Linden Street Bridge and the Stony Brook Bridge were built in 1894 and 1896 respectively by the same railroad, following the design of the Norwottuck Rail Trail Bridge.

The Norwottuck Rail Trail Bridge was redesigned by Vanasse Hangen Brustlin, Inc. of Watertown, rebuilt by MassHighway, and opened in 1992 to bicycle and foot traffic, as part of then named Norwottuck Rail Trail, and now the Norwottuck Branch of the Mass Central Rail Trail.

== See also ==
- List of bridges documented by the Historic American Engineering Record in Massachusetts
- List of crossings of the Connecticut River
