= Middletown–Portland railroad bridge =

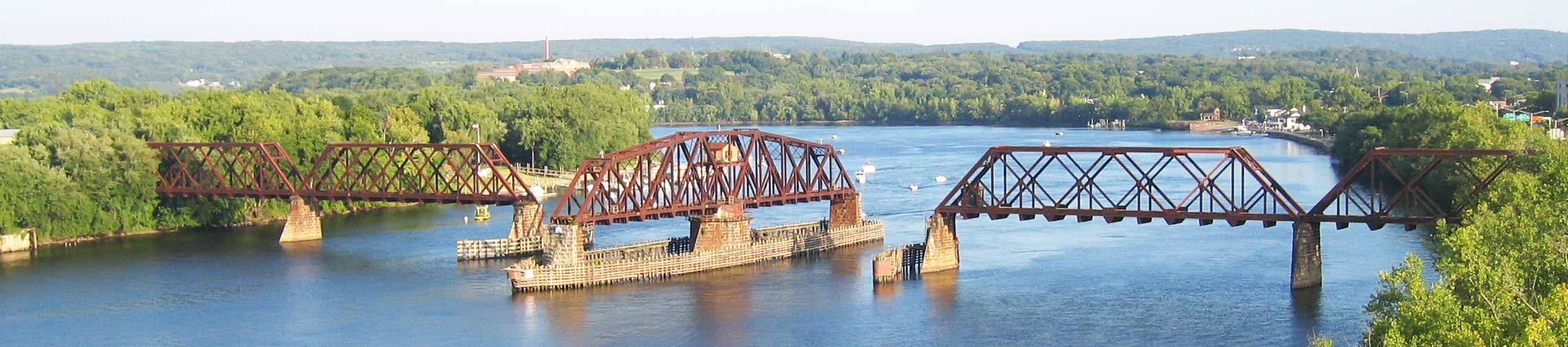
- The bridge viewed from the Arrigoni Bridge in 2007
- Coordinates: 41°34′00″N 72°38′52″W
- Carries: Providence and Worcester Railroad freight branch
- Crosses: Connecticut River
- Locale: Middletown and Portland, Connecticut
- Maintained by: ConnDOT

Characteristics
- Design: rail swing truss bridge
- Clearance below: 25 feet (7.6 m)

History
- Opened: 1911

Location
- Interactive map of Middletown–Portland railroad bridge

The Middletown–Portland railroad bridge is a swing truss railroad bridge crossing the Connecticut River and Route 9 in Middletown, Connecticut, just south of the Arrigoni Bridge. The bridge is a Warren through-truss swing bridge with an overall length of 1,142 ft (348 m) and a rotating center span. It is used by the Providence and Worcester Railroad to serve freight customers in Portland.

The first rail bridge at the site was constructed by the Boston and New York Air-Line Railroad in 1873. It was replaced by the current bridge in 1911. The bridge was featured prominently in the video for the 1993 Billy Joel hit "The River of Dreams".

As of August 2026, ConnDOT plans to rehabilitate the bridge from 2028 to 2031 at a cost of $87 million.

== See also ==
- List of crossings of the Connecticut River
