= Wells River Bridge =

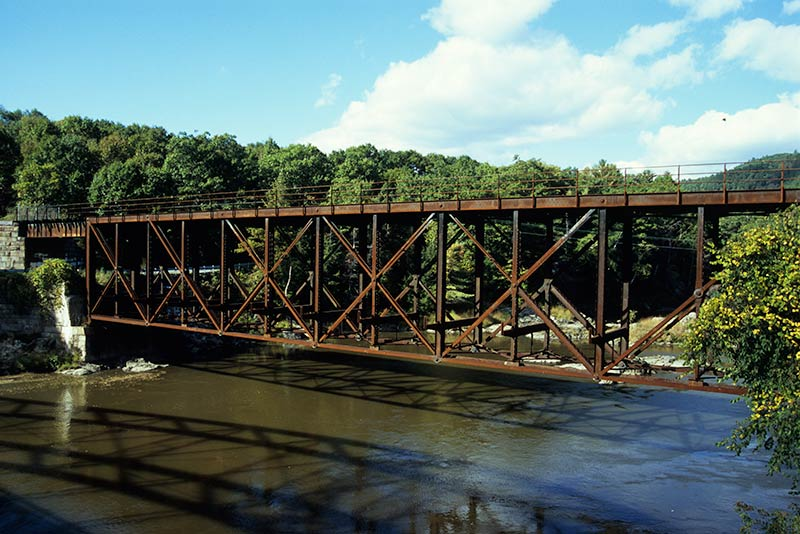
- Wells River Bridge in 2007
- Coordinates: 44°09′15″N 72°02′26″W
- Crosses: Connecticut River
- Locale: between Woodsville, New Hampshire and Wells River, Vermont
- Official name: Veterans Memorial Bridge

Characteristics
- Design: steel pin-connected Baltimore truss
- Total length: 253 feet (77 m)

History
- Construction end: 1805, 1853, 1903, reopened 2001-2003

The Wells River Bridge between Wells River, Vermont and Woodsville, New Hampshire, is a steel double-decked Baltimore truss bridge over the Connecticut River. It was built in 1903 to carry rail and road traffic.

== History ==
The first bridge at this crossing was built in 1805. In 1853, the Boston, Concord, & Montreal Railroad built a double-decked wooden Burr truss covered bridge over the Connecticut River on this alignment. The railroad collected tolls from users of the highway.

The current Wells River Bridge was built in 1903 by the Boston & Maine Railroad, which took over the route, to carry rail and road traffic, to replace the previous bridge. In 1917, the road traffic was rerouted over a new bridge just downstream, called the Ranger Bridge. The railroad continued to use this bridge until no later than 2001, when it was used for vehicle traffic while the Ranger Bridge was being rehabilitated. As of 2007, this bridge is fenced off and unused.

== See also ==
- List of crossings of the Connecticut River
