= Enfield–Suffield Veterans Bridge =

Enfield-Suffield Veterans Bridge
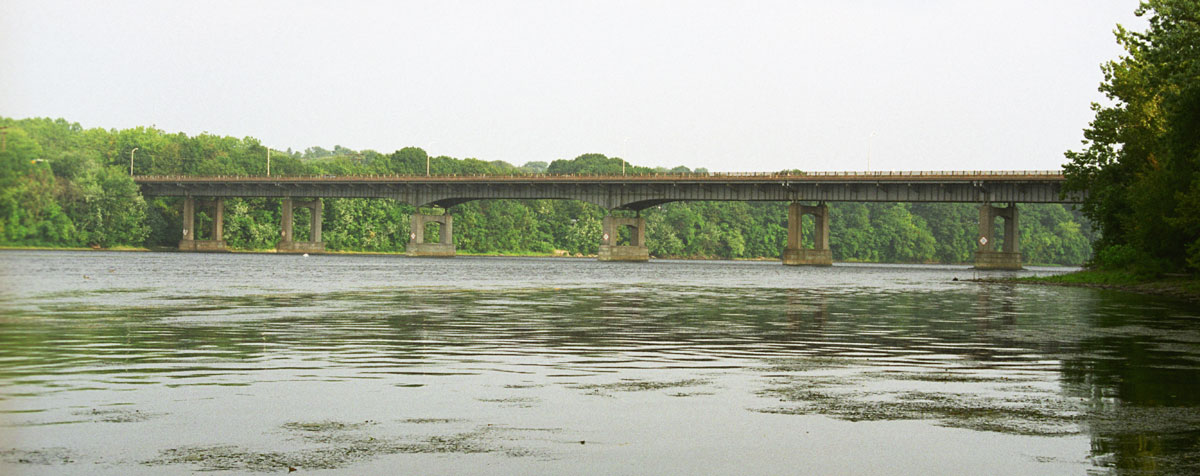
- Coordinates: 41°59′23″N 72°36′13″W
- Carries: Route 190, Windsor Locks Canal Trail
- Crosses: Connecticut River
- Locale: Enfield, Connecticut and Suffield, Connecticut
- Maintained by: ConnDOT

Characteristics
- Design: Steel plate girder bridge

History
- Construction end: 1966
- Opened: 1966

The Enfield–Suffield Veterans Bridge, commonly known in either town as the Enfield Bridge or Suffield Bridge, is the main traffic crossing that connects the towns of Enfield and Suffield, Connecticut over the Connecticut River. It carries Route 190 as well as the Windsor Locks Canal State Park Trail across the river.

== See also ==
- List of crossings of the Connecticut River
