= Neal Pond =

Lake in Vermont

Coordinates: 44.4905504°N 71.6925811°W

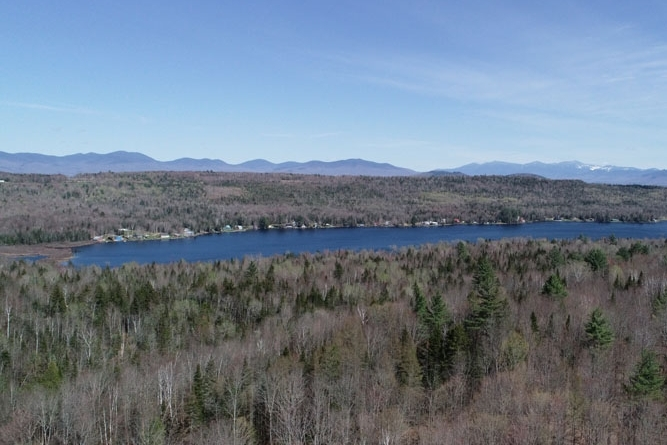
Looking east over Neal Pond

Neal Pond is a 185-acre body of freshwater located in Lunenburg, in Essex County, Vermont. The pond is fed by Hall Brook and Neal Brook at the northern end. Water exits Neal Pond at the southern end, where Neal Brook flows south until it meets the Connecticut River.

The shoreline is developed with approximately 70 cabins, camps, and public boat ramp managed by the Vermont Fish & Wildlife Department. Neal Pond has native fish, including Bullhead, Chain Pickerel, Northern Pike, Smallmouth Bass, and Yellow Perch.

A 2011 report found that Neal Pond had Eriocaulon septangulare growth along most of the shoreline and rare Equisetum growth.
