= Thompsonville, Connecticut =

Census-designated place in Connecticut, United States

- Census-designated place
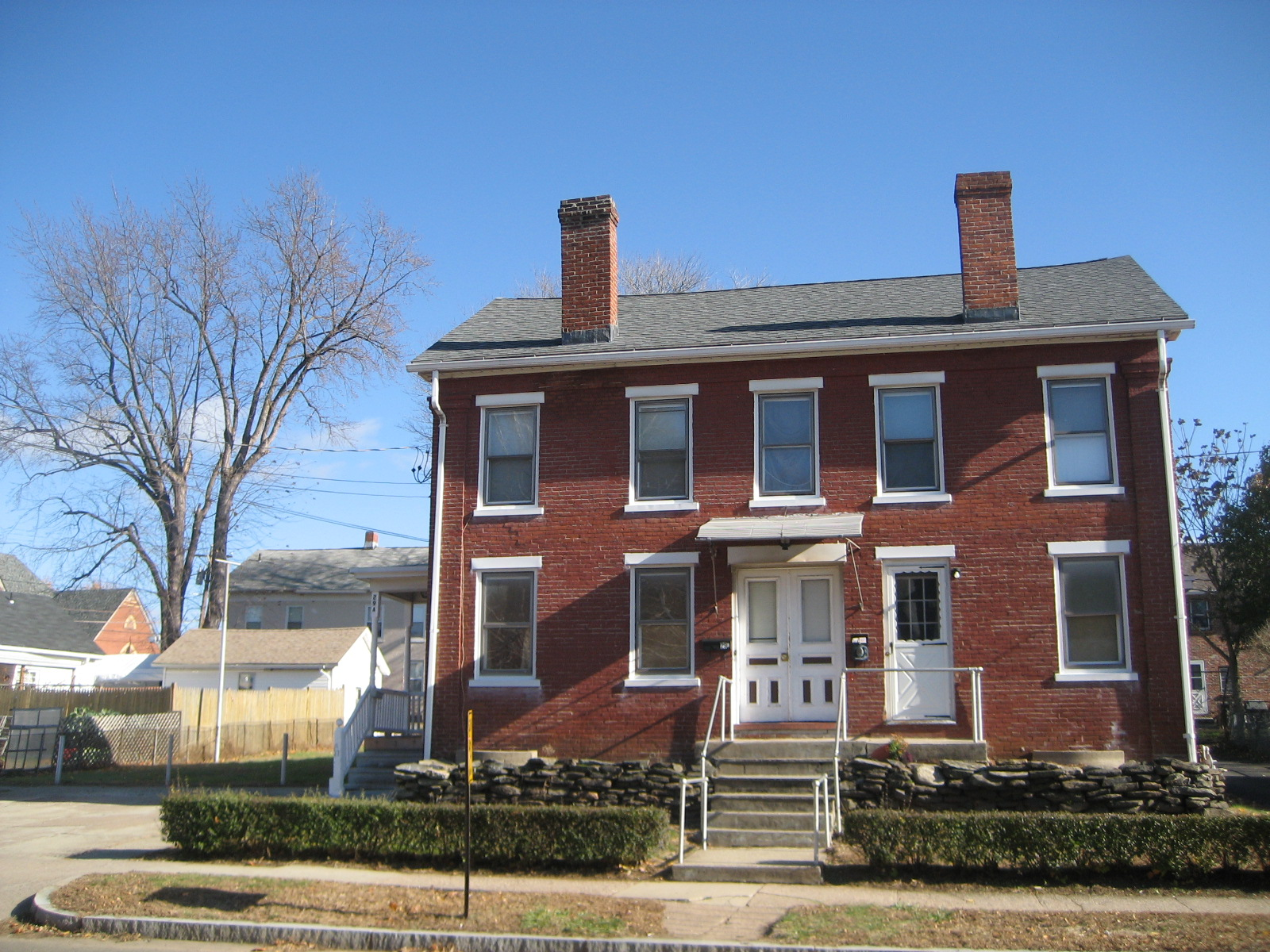
- Brick houses in Thompsonville

- Location within Connecticut Location within the United States
- Coordinates: 41°59′49″N 72°35′56″W
- Country: United States
- State: Connecticut
- County: Hartford
- Town: Enfield

Area
  - Total: 2.34 sq mi (6.06 km^{2})
  - Land: 2.03 sq mi (5.27 km^{2})
  - Water: 0.31 sq mi (0.79 km^{2})
- Elevation: 115 ft (35 m)

Population (2010)
  - Total: 8,577
  - Density: 4,214/sq mi (1,627.1/km^{2})
- Time zone: UTC-5 (Eastern)
  - Summer (DST): UTC-4 (Eastern)
- ZIP code: 06082
- Area code: 860
- FIPS code: 09-75940
- GNIS feature ID: 2377873

Thompsonville is a census-designated place (CDP) in the town of Enfield, Connecticut, United States. As of the 2020 census, Thompsonville had a population of 8,514.

== History ==
Thompsonville was established in the 19th century as a carpet-manufacturing community. Orrin Thompson, from whom the community takes its name, built a dam across Freshwater Brook in 1828 and opened the first carpet mill in 1829. Thompson's first mill, named "White Mill", employed skilled weavers brought from Scotland. Initially its product was largely flat-woven ingrain carpeting, an inexpensive type of carpeting, but over time it added more expensive weaves, such as three-ply ingrain and loop brussels. The mill had 230 looms in operation as of 1846.

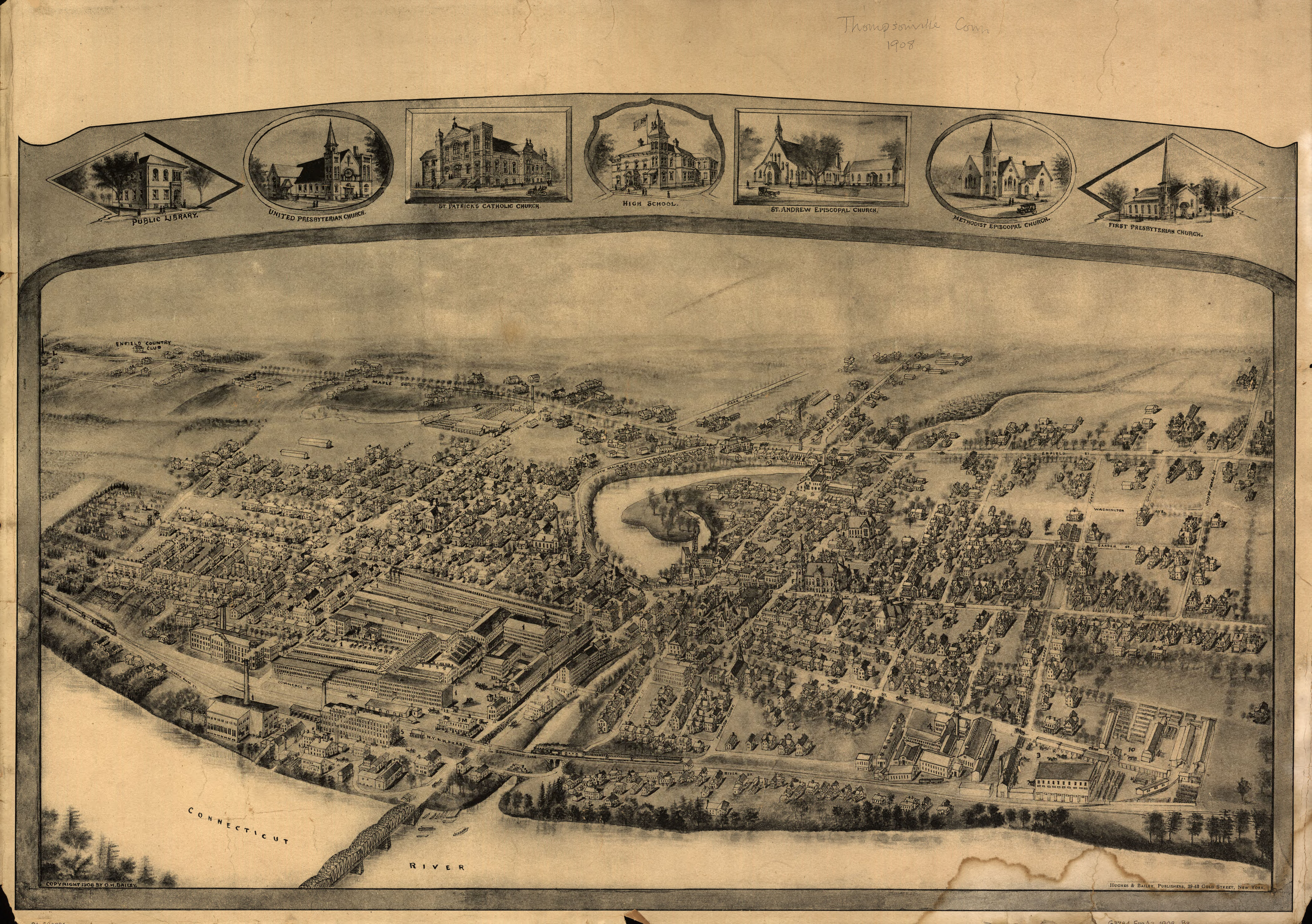
Panoramic map of Thompsonville with images of sights inset

Carpeting continued to be manufactured in Thompsonville until 1971, by which time most production had shifted to the southern United States.

== Geography ==
According to the United States Census Bureau, the CDP has a total area of 2.4 square miles (6.1 km^{2}), of which 2.0 square miles (5.3 km^{2}) is land and 0.31 square miles (0.8 km^{2}), or 12.99%, is water. Thompsonville is located on the east bank of the Connecticut River and is bounded by Interstate 91 to the east. U.S. Route 5 (Enfield Street) is the main road through the village, leading north to Longmeadow, Massachusetts, and into Springfield, and south through East and South Windsor to East Hartford. Connecticut Route 190 crosses Route 5, leading west across the Connecticut River into Suffield and east to Hazardville.

== Demographics ==
=== 2020 census ===
As of the 2020 census, Thompsonville had a population of 8,514. The median age was 34.7 years. 23.6% of residents were under the age of 18 and 14.0% of residents were 65 years of age or older. For every 100 females there were 92.4 males, and for every 100 females age 18 and over there were 89.2 males age 18 and over.

100.0% of residents lived in urban areas, while 0.0% lived in rural areas.

There were 3,491 households in Thompsonville, of which 29.5% had children under the age of 18 living in them. Of all households, 26.8% were married-couple households, 25.2% were households with a male householder and no spouse or partner present, and 36.5% were households with a female householder and no spouse or partner present. About 37.3% of all households were made up of individuals and 11.3% had someone living alone who was 65 years of age or older.

There were 3,792 housing units, of which 7.9% were vacant. The homeowner vacancy rate was 2.0% and the rental vacancy rate was 5.5%.

Racial composition as of the 2020 census
Race	Number	Percent
White	5,848	68.7%
Black or African American	863	10.1%
American Indian and Alaska Native	60	0.7%
Asian	243	2.9%
Native Hawaiian and Other Pacific Islander	1	0.0%
Some other race	680	8.0%
Two or more races	819	9.6%
Hispanic or Latino (of any race)	1,540	18.1%

=== 2000 census ===
At the 2000 census there were 8,125 people, 3,442 households, and 1,896 families living in the CDP. The population density was 3,797.9 inhabitants per square mile (1,466.4/km^{2}). There were 3,728 housing units at an average density of 1,742.6 per square mile (672.8/km^{2}). The racial makeup of the CDP was 90.01% White, 3.96% African American, 0.33% Native American, 1.61% Asian, 0.05% Pacific Islander, 1.50% from other races, and 2.54% from two or more races. Hispanic or Latino of any race were 4.70%.

Of the 3,442 households 29.5% had children under the age of 18 living with them, 33.3% were married couples living together, 17.0% had a female householder with no husband present, and 44.9% were non-families. 36.5% of households were one person and 11.5% were one person aged 65 or older. The average household size was 2.28 and the average family size was 3.02.

The age distribution was 25.5% under the age of 18, 8.2% from 18 to 24, 34.0% from 25 to 44, 16.6% from 45 to 64, and 15.7% 65 or older. The median age was 35 years. For every 100 females, there were 90.4 males. For every 100 females age 18 and over, there were 86.6 males.

The median household income was $39,154 and the median family income was $42,692. Males had a median income of $38,000 versus $29,550 for females. The per capita income for the CDP was $19,851. About 7.3% of families and 9.2% of the population were below the poverty line, including 11.8% of those under age 18 and 12.0% of those age 65 or over.
