= Norwottuck Branch Rail Trail =

Paved rail trail in Massachusetts, US

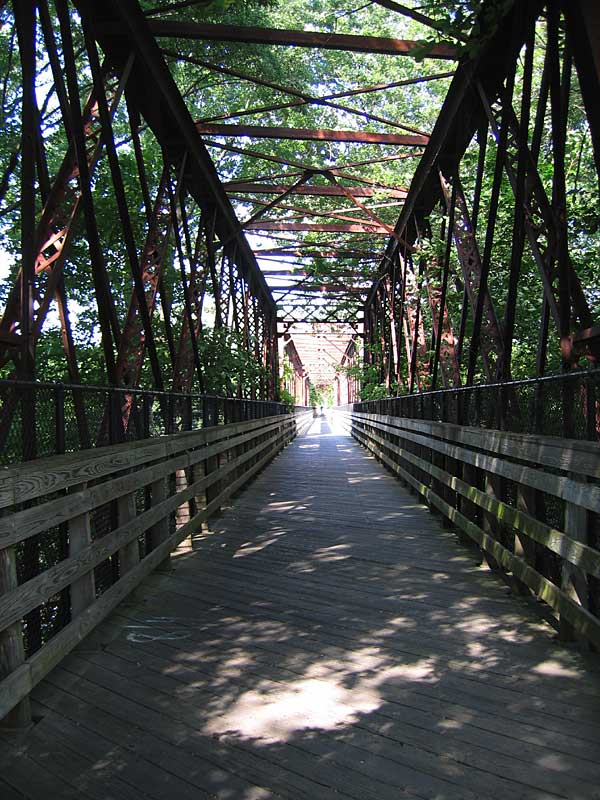
- Looking east from the western trailhead
- Length: 11 mi (18 km)
- Location: Northampton, Massachusetts to Belchertown, Massachusetts
- Established: 1993
- Designation: Massachusetts state park
- Trailheads: 42.32912°N 72.63227°W to 42.32947°N 72.46342°W
- Use: Hiking, bicycling, inline skating, cross-country skiing
- Difficulty: Easy
- Season: Year-round
- Sights: Beaver pond near the eastern end with various birds and other fauna (the Amherst College Wildlife Sanctuary), former rail bridge
- Surface: Paved
- Right of way: Former Central Massachusetts Railroad
- Maintained by: Department of Conservation and Recreation
- Website: Norwottuck Rail Trail

Trail map
- Norwottuck Branch of the Mass Central Rail Trail

The Norwottuck Branch Rail Trail (full name the Norwottuck Branch of the Mass Central Rail Trail, and formerly the Norwottuck Rail Trail) is an 11-mile (18 km) combination bicycle/pedestrian paved rail trail running from Northampton, Massachusetts, through Hadley and Amherst, to Belchertown, Massachusetts. It opened in 1993, and is now part of the longer Mass Central Rail Trail. It is considered to be part of the Northampton Rail Trail System which continues from the western terminus, and is proposed to connect to the Belchertown Greenway from the eastern terminus.

== Use ==
This trail is used by bicyclers, rollerbladers, and hikers. Both recreational and commuter traffic occurs here.

Sights to see include the Norwottuck Rail Trail Bridge over the Connecticut River. The beaver pond near the eastern end of the trail is host to a number of different kinds of birds including great blue heron and various woodpeckers, as well as ducks, turtles, and various other critters.

== Extension ==
The trail has been extended to the east approximately 1.5 miles (2.4 km) and currently ends at Warren Wright Road south of North Road and north of Wilson Road. A westward extension from Damon Road to Woodmont Road in Northampton opened in 2007. The trail ends close to the Northampton Bikeway, which runs from the other side of King Street to Florence and Look Park. Construction of a rail with trail project southward to downtown Northampton and Easthampton (to connect with the Manhan Rail Trail) is in the planning stages, as is a tunnel underneath the active rail line to join with the Northampton Bikeway. An underpass connecting the trail with the Northampton Bikeway north of downtown Northampton was expect to be bid on in 2015 and was expected to be completed in 2016. Trail users had been frustrated with the missing connection for years. Bidding on the project was closed in March 2016. The Massachusetts Department of Transportation selected Northern Construction Service for the $4.4 million tunnel with an expected completion in October 2017. The tunnel was opened in early November 2017. There are various other possible connections being considered, such as a connection to the Canalside Rail Trail.

The Mass Central Rail Trail is a partially completed 104-mile (167 km) bicycle path from Boston westward, incorporating the Norwottuck Rail Trail as part of its length.

== Reconstruction ==
The original trail had degraded over time. One aspect of the problem is that the original pavement was an attempt at being "green", and incorporated crushed used glass bottles as part of its aggregate. This material had been slowly emerging over time, causing flat tires and other issues.

As a response to the condition of the trail, the Massachusetts Department of Conservation and Recreation and the Massachusetts Department of Transportation Highway Division embarked on the Norwottuck Branch Rail Trail Rehabilitation Project. Specifics of the reconstruction plan included widening the trail from its original 8 feet (2.4 m) to 10 feet (3.0 m) to better accommodate busy traffic, especially on weekends, since widening would lessen the impact of traffic as on any other kind of road. After being under discussion for several years, the $4 million reconstruction project got underway in August 2013; it was completed in June 2015.

== History ==
The rail bed under which the trail operated opened in 1887 under the control of the Central Massachusetts Railroad. Shortly after its completion, it was leased by the Boston and Maine Railroad and referred to as the Central Massachusetts Branch. Three round trip passenger trains were run in the 1920s, as well as numerous freight trains. Competition from cars and trucks caused a decline on the line, as passenger service was discontinued in 1932 and freight service managed to hang on for another forty-two years, primarily to deliver goods to a farmer's supply warehouse in Amherst.

The rail bed was acquired by the state in 1980 and developed into the trail in 1993, then titled the Norwottuck Rail Trail. The name of "Norwottuck" was the result of a suggestion by the Hadley Historical Commission, who believed that the name corresponded to the local Native American tribe, the Norwottucks. It was also the term for the entire area. The Department of Conservation and Recreation later expanded the trail's name to the Norwottuck Branch of the Mass Central Rail Trail, as part of the effort to complete the Mass Central Rail Trail.

== See also ==
- Norwottuck Rail Trail Bridge
- Central Massachusetts Railroad
