= Gilman, Vermont =

Census-designated place in Vermont, United States

- Census-designated place
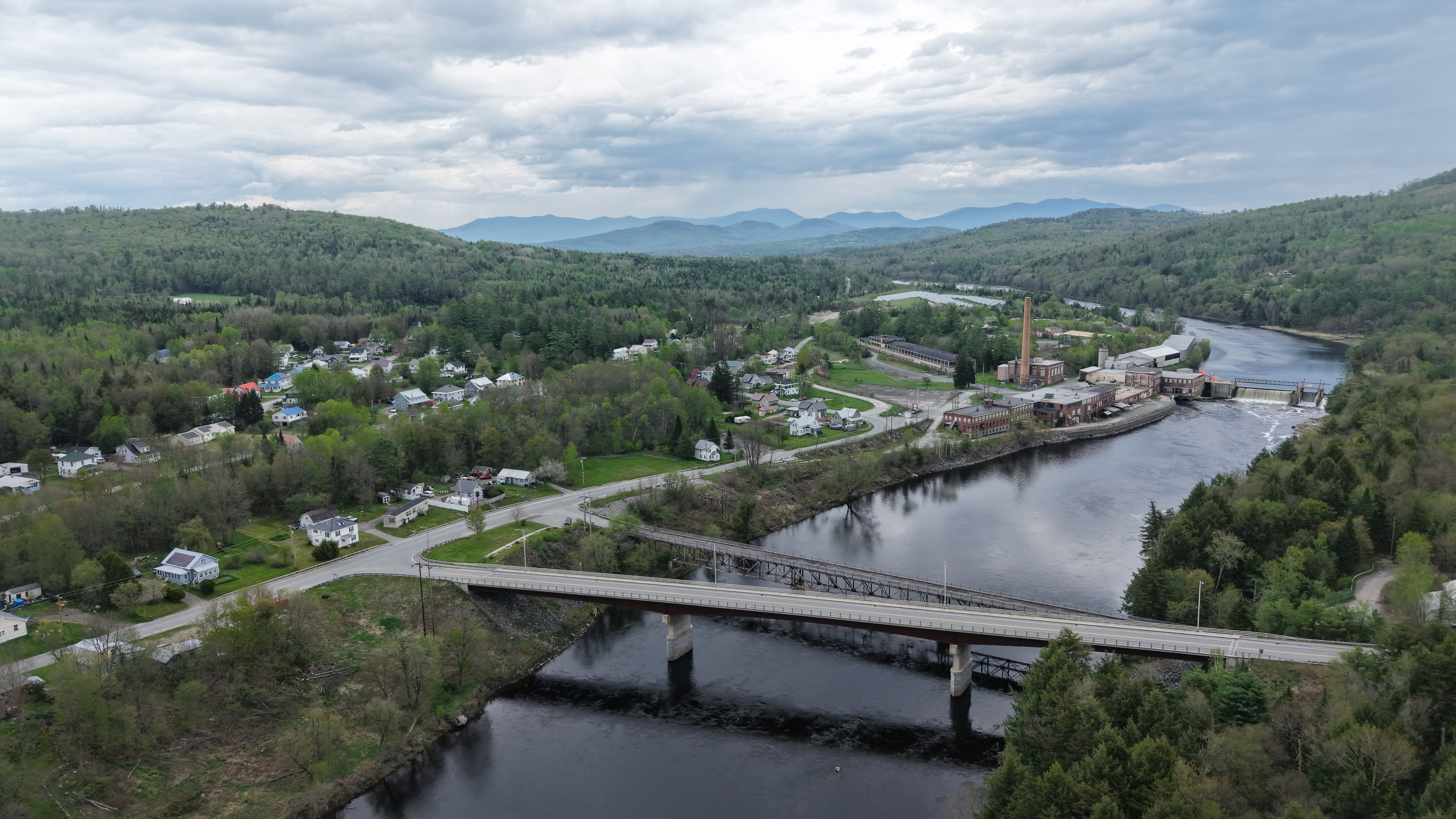
- Gilman, VT, from the west

- Location within Vermont Location within the United States
- Coordinates: 44°24′49″N 71°42′56″W
- Country: United States
- State: Vermont
- County: Essex
- Town: Lunenburg
- Elevation: 850 ft (260 m)
- Time zone: UTC-5 (Eastern (EST))
  - Summer (DST): UTC-4 (EDT)
- Zip code: 05904
- Area code: 802
- GNIS feature ID: 2807144

Gilman (also Fitzdale) is an unincorporated community and census-designated place (CDP) in the town of Lunenburg, Essex County, Vermont, United States. It was first listed as a CDP prior to the 2020 census. As of the 2020 census, Gilman had a population of 238. The community has a post office with ZIP code 05904.

== Notable people ==
- George L. Fox, who was one of the Four Chaplains, was the minister of a Methodist church in Gilman.
