= Enfield Falls Canal =

Canal in Connecticut, United States

- Windsor Locks Canal and railroad bridge (postcard mailed in 1909)
- Interactive map of Enfield Falls Canal

Specifications
- Length: 5.25 miles (8.45 km)
- Locks: 1 (north end); 3 (south end)
- Status: Closed
- Navigation authority
- Enfield Falls Canal (Windsor Locks Canal)
- U.S. National Register of Historic Places
- Location within Connecticut Location within the United States
- Nearest city: Windsor Locks, Connecticut
- Area: 55 acres (22 ha)
- Built: 1829
- Engineer: Canvass White
- NRHP reference No.: 76001998
- Added to NRHP: April 22, 1976

History
- Construction began: 1827
- Date completed: November 11, 1829

Geography
- Start point: 41.9866°N 72.6053°W
- End point: 41.9169°N 72.6248°W

Enfield Falls Canal (commonly known as the Windsor Locks Canal) is a canal that was built to circumvent the shallows at Enfield Falls (or Enfield Rapids) on the Connecticut River, between Hartford, Connecticut and Springfield, Massachusetts. It is situated along the west side of the river, adjacent to the towns of Suffield and Windsor Locks in Hartford County in the state of Connecticut, United States. Windsor Locks is named after the series of locks on the canal.

== History ==
Prior to the opening of the canal, the scows or flat-bottomed boats which plied the Connecticut River could only ascend the falls by engaging local fallsmen to propel the craft forward utilizing set poles. One fallsman was required for each ton of cargo. Not only did the added labor costs make this method of overtaking the falls expensive, but the amount of cargo that could be transported was limited to approximately ten tons. Any additional freight had to be offloaded at Warehouse Point on the east bank and warehoused for later transport or carried around the falls by ox teams.

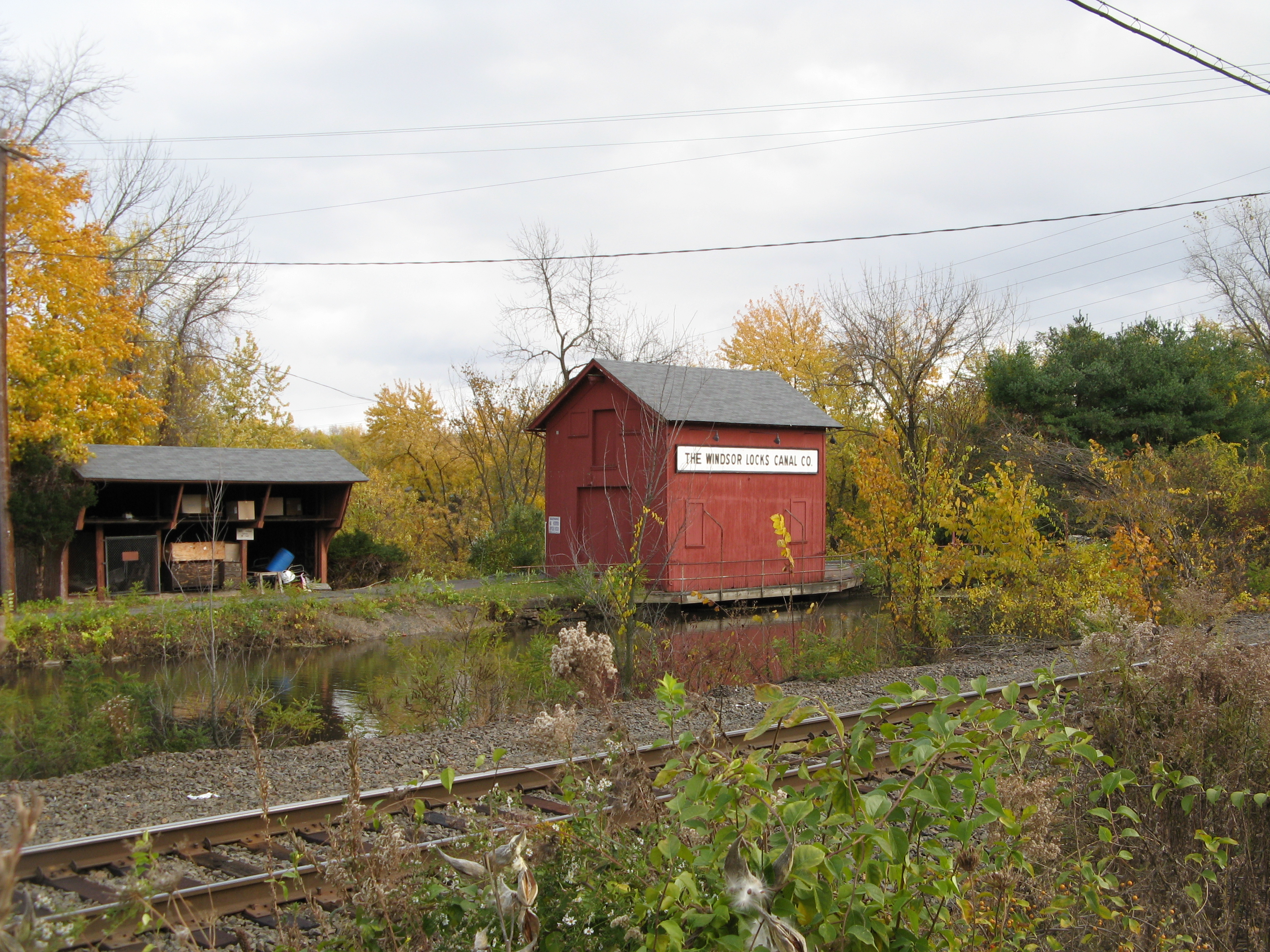
Windsor Locks Canal Company buildings alongside the canal. Amtrak's New Haven-Springfield Line is visible in the foreground.

Construction of the canal commenced in 1827 and it was opened on November 11, 1829. The canal was 5 1/4 miles (8.4 km) long and had a vertical drop of 32 ft (9.8 m). The locks admitted craft up to 90 ft (27 m) long and 20 ft (6.1 m) wide. The canal was unique among canals of the era in that it was designed with structural reinforcement to facilitate steam tug boat traffic. The design of the canal included a massive head gate with apertures that could be opened and closed to precisely control water levels not only within the lock chambers but within the canal itself. The design feature supported the incorporator's dual intent to profit not only from tolls charged on canal traffic but from the sale of mill sites and the leasing of water rights to mill operators along the last mile of the canal bank.

Once the canal was opened, boats were able to carry much larger loads, and the anticipated steamboat services were introduced using newly designed vessels capable of passing through the lock chambers. Charles Dickens traveled along the canal on February 7, 1842. However, by 1844 the Hartford and Springfield Railroad had started operation, and navigation on the Connecticut River gradually reduced. The profits realized from the sale of water rights proved to be the more lucrative of the canal's two purposes.

== Today ==
Today the canal is listed in the National Register of Historic Places, but closed to navigation and privately owned by the Ahlstrom Corporation, which has a manufacturing facility adjacent to the canal. The locks themselves still exist, but have not been usable since the 1970s. The towpath is open for hiking and cycling as the Windsor Locks Canal State Park Trail. The trail is generally open from April 1 through November 15. The southernmost portion of the trail runs parallel to the J. R. Montgomery Company Industrial Complex.

== See also ==
- Windsor Locks Canal State Park Trail
- J. R. Montgomery Company Industrial Complex
- National Register of Historic Places listings in Hartford County, Connecticut
