= Lunenburg, Vermont =

- Town
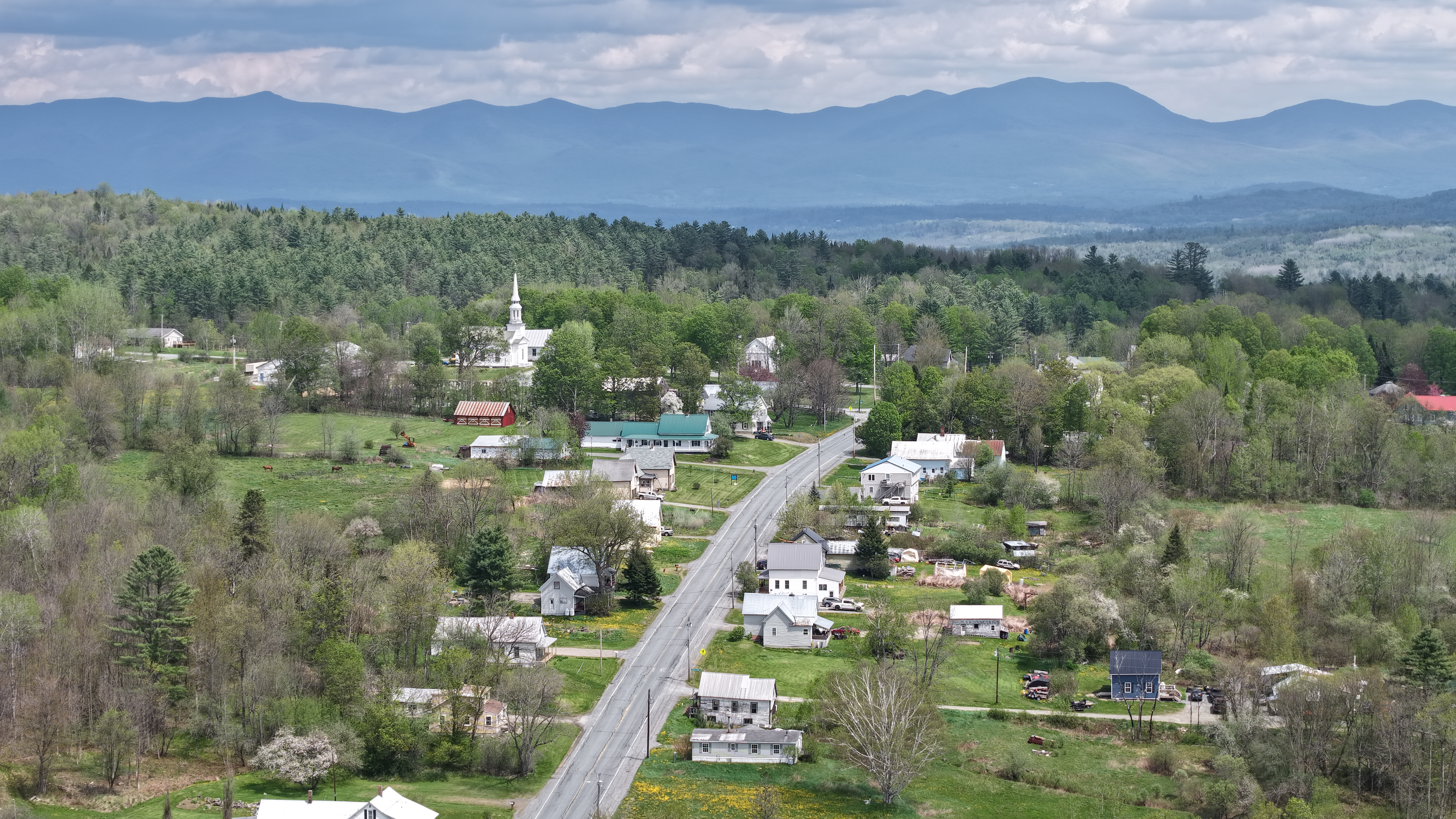
- Lunenburg, VT, from the southwest

- Seal
- Nickname: The Mountain Town
- Location in Essex County and the state of Vermont
- Coordinates: 44°29′11″N 71°42′4″W
- Country: United States
- State: Vermont
- County: Essex
- Communities: Lunenburg; Gilman; Mill Village; South Lunenburg; West Lunenburg

Area
  - Total: 45.8 sq mi (118.6 km^{2})
  - Land: 45.1 sq mi (116.7 km^{2})
  - Water: 0.69 sq mi (1.8 km^{2})
- Elevation: 1,240 ft (380 m)

Population (2020)
  - Total: 1,246
  - Density: 28/sq mi (10.7/km^{2})
- Time zone: UTC-5 (EST)
  - Summer (DST): UTC-4 (EDT)
- ZIP Codes: 05904 (Lunenburg); 05906 (Gilman)
- Area code: 802
- FIPS code: 50-41425
- GNIS feature ID: 1462139
- Website: www.lunenburg-gilmanvt.gov

Lunenburg is a town in Essex County, Vermont, United States. The population was 1,246 at the 2020 census, the most populous in Essex County. Lunenburg contains the villages of Lunenburg and Gilman and hamlets of South Lunenburg and Mill Village (Northern Lunenburg), and is part of the Berlin, NH –VT Micropolitan Statistical Area.

== History ==
Lunenburg was granted by Benning Wentworth, the royal governor of New Hampshire, on July 5, 1763, to David Page and 68 other people. It is widely believed that David Page named the town, which stems from one of the titles for Prince Karl Wilhelm Ferdinand of Brunswick-Lunenburg. Lunenburg was the home of Vermont State Representative Adino Nye Bell. Lunenburg is also believed to have inspired the Robert Frost poem "The Mountain", which takes place in a town called Lunenburg.

== Geography ==
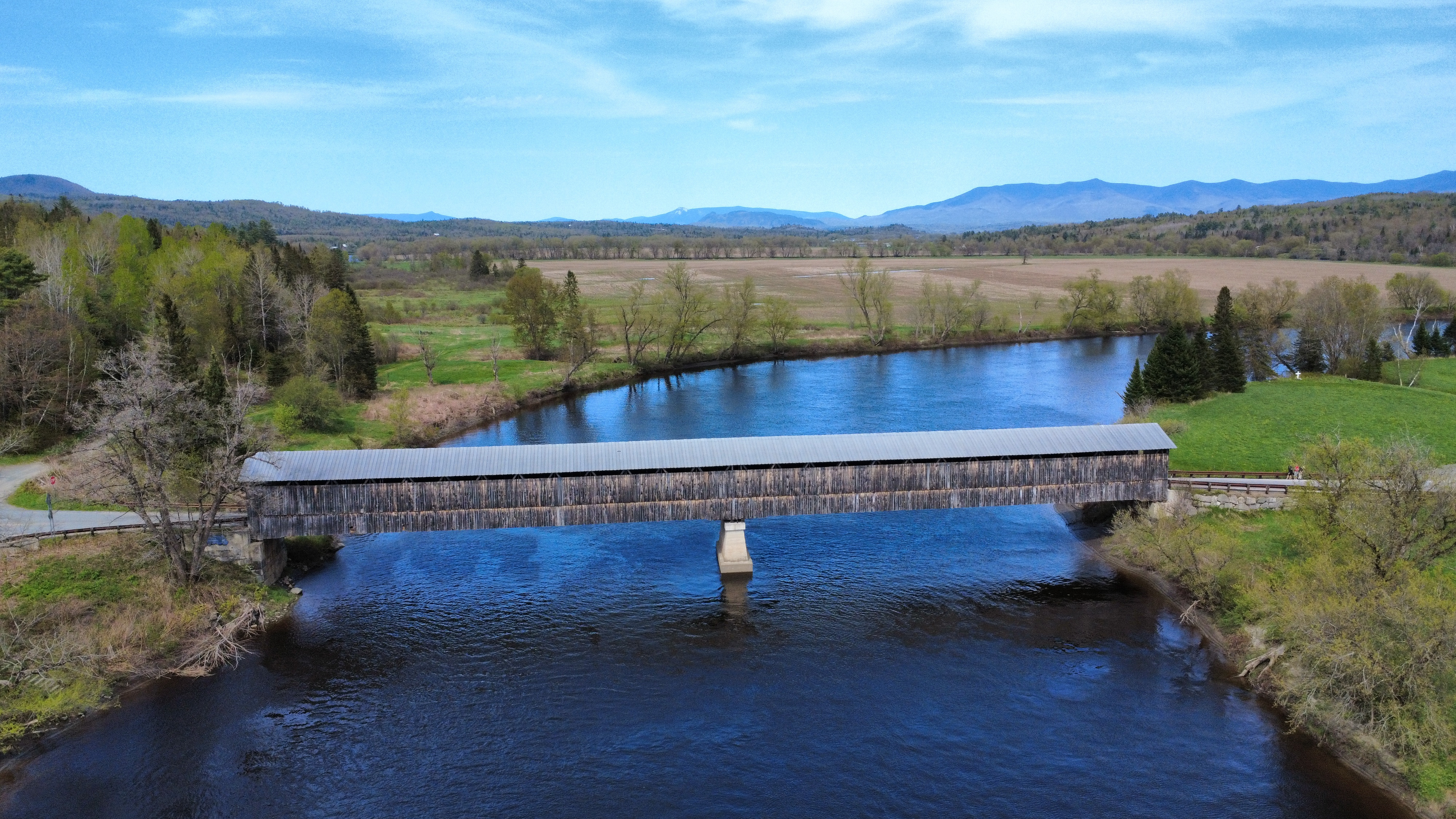
Mount Orne Covered Bridge between Lunenburg and South Lancaster, NH

Lunenburg is in southern Essex County along the Connecticut River, the border between Vermont and New Hampshire. It is bordered to the west by the town of Concord, to the northwest by Victory, at its northernmost point by Granby, and to the northeast by Guildhall, all in Vermont. Across the Connecticut, to the east is the town of Lancaster, New Hampshire, and to the south is the town of Dalton, New Hampshire. U.S. Route 2 crosses through the center of Lunenburg, leading west to St. Johnsbury and east to Lancaster and Gorham, New Hampshire. The Mount Orne Covered Bridge is in the eastern part of town, crossing the Connecticut to South Lancaster, New Hampshire.

According to the United States Census Bureau, Lunenburg has a total area of 45.8 square miles (118.6 km^{2}), of which 45.1 square miles (116.7 km^{2}) is land and 0.69 square miles (1.8 km^{2}), or 1.55%, is water. Neal Pond, north of the town center, is the largest body of water. There are also four brooks—Neal Brook, Mink Brook, Catbow Brook, and Hudson Brook—all of which feed into the Connecticut River. There are also smaller creeks throughout the town. The highest point is 2,279-foot (695 m) Temple Mountain in the northern part of town.

== Demographics ==
Historical population
Census	Pop.	Note	%±
1790	119		—
1800	393		230.3%
1810	714		81.7%
1820	856		19.9%
1830	1,054		23.1%
1840	1,130		7.2%
1850	1,123		−0.6%
1860	1,034		−7.9%
1870	999		−3.4%
1880	1,038		3.9%
1890	1,019		−1.8%
1900	968		−5.0%
1910	880		−9.1%
1920	1,048		19.1%
1930	1,400		33.6%
1940	1,374		−1.9%
1950	1,299		−5.5%
1960	1,237		−4.8%
1970	1,061		−14.2%
1980	1,138		7.3%
1990	1,176		3.3%
2000	1,328		12.9%
2010	1,302		−2.0%
2020	1,246		−4.3%
U.S. Decennial Census

As of the census of 2000, there were 1,328 people, 516 households, and 366 families living in the town. The population density was 29.5 inhabitants per square mile (11.4/km^{2}). There were 747 housing units at an average density of 16.6 per square mile (6.4/km^{2}). The racial makeup of the town was 97.82% White, 0.08% African American, 0.68% Native American, 0.08% Asian, and 1.36% from two or more races. Hispanic or Latino of any race were 0.38% of the population.

There were 516 households, out of which 33.5% had children under the age of 18 living with them, 57.0% were married couples living together, 8.5% had a female householder with no husband present, and 28.9% were non-families. 21.7% of all households were made up of individuals, and 9.7% had someone living alone who was 65 years of age or older. The average household size was 2.55 and the average family size was 2.97.

In the town, the population was spread out, with 26.4% under the age of 18, 7.1% from 18 to 24, 29.1% from 25 to 44, 23.1% from 45 to 64, and 14.4% who were 65 years of age or older. The median age was 37 years. For every 100 females, there were 103.1 males. For every 100 females age 18 and over, there were 98.8 males.

The median income for a household in the town was $28,802, and the median income for a family was $33,000. Males had a median income of $26,793 versus $18,594 for females. The per capita income for the town was $12,804. About 8.7% of families and 12.6% of the population were below the poverty line, including 15.0% of those under age 18 and 9.9% of those age 65 or over.

== Presidential Election Results ==
Year	Democrat	Republican	Other	Total	National Winner
1980	156	230	31	417	Ronald Reagan (R)
1984	120	299	0	419	Ronald Reagan (R)
1988	182	278	1	461	George H. W. Bush (R)
1992	227	188	159	574	Bill Clinton (D)
1996	207	164	76	447	Bill Clinton (D)
2000	210	320	29	559	George W. Bush (R)
2004	252	314	7	573	George W. Bush (R)
2008	330	269	19	618	Barack Obama (D)
2012	296	243	28	567	Barack Obama (D)
2016	171	311	80	562	Donald Trump (R)
2020	243	366	32	641	Joe Biden (D)
