= Deerfield–Montague railroad bridge =

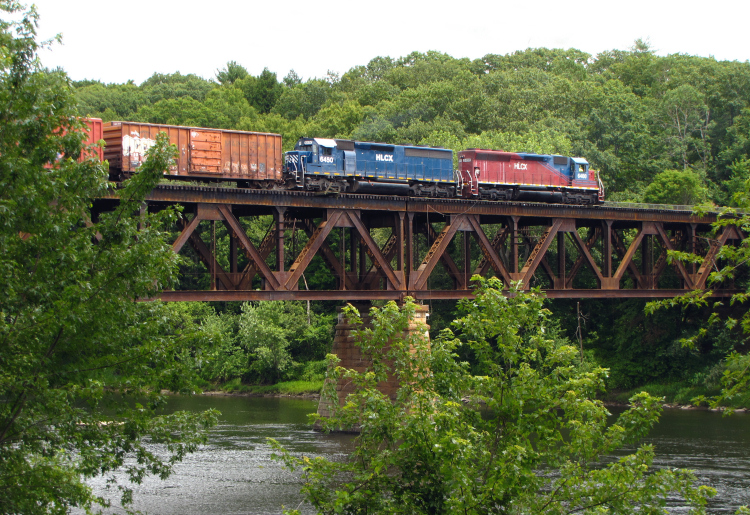
- Pan Am Railways freight train on the bridge in 2010
- Coordinates: 42°33′44″N 72°33′22″W
- Carries: Fitchburg Route
- Crosses: Connecticut River
- Locale: Deerfield and Montague, Franklin County, Massachusetts
- Maintained by: Berkshire and Eastern Railroad

Characteristics
- Design: Deck truss bridge
- Material: Iron on masonry piers
- No. of spans: 3
- Piers in water: 2

A three-span deck-truss railroad bridge crosses the Connecticut River between Deerfield and Montague in Franklin County, Massachusetts.

The railroad crossing at this location dates to 1850 when a branch of the Fitchburg Railroad opened from Grout's Corner west to Greenfield. This line would later connect to the Hoosac Tunnel, which opened to rail traffic in 1875. The bridge carries rail traffic in and out of the former Boston & Maine Railroad yard at East Deerfield. The bridge, owned by Pan Am Southern, is at the east end of the yard.
