= Windsor Locks Canal State Park Trail =

State park in Connecticut, United States

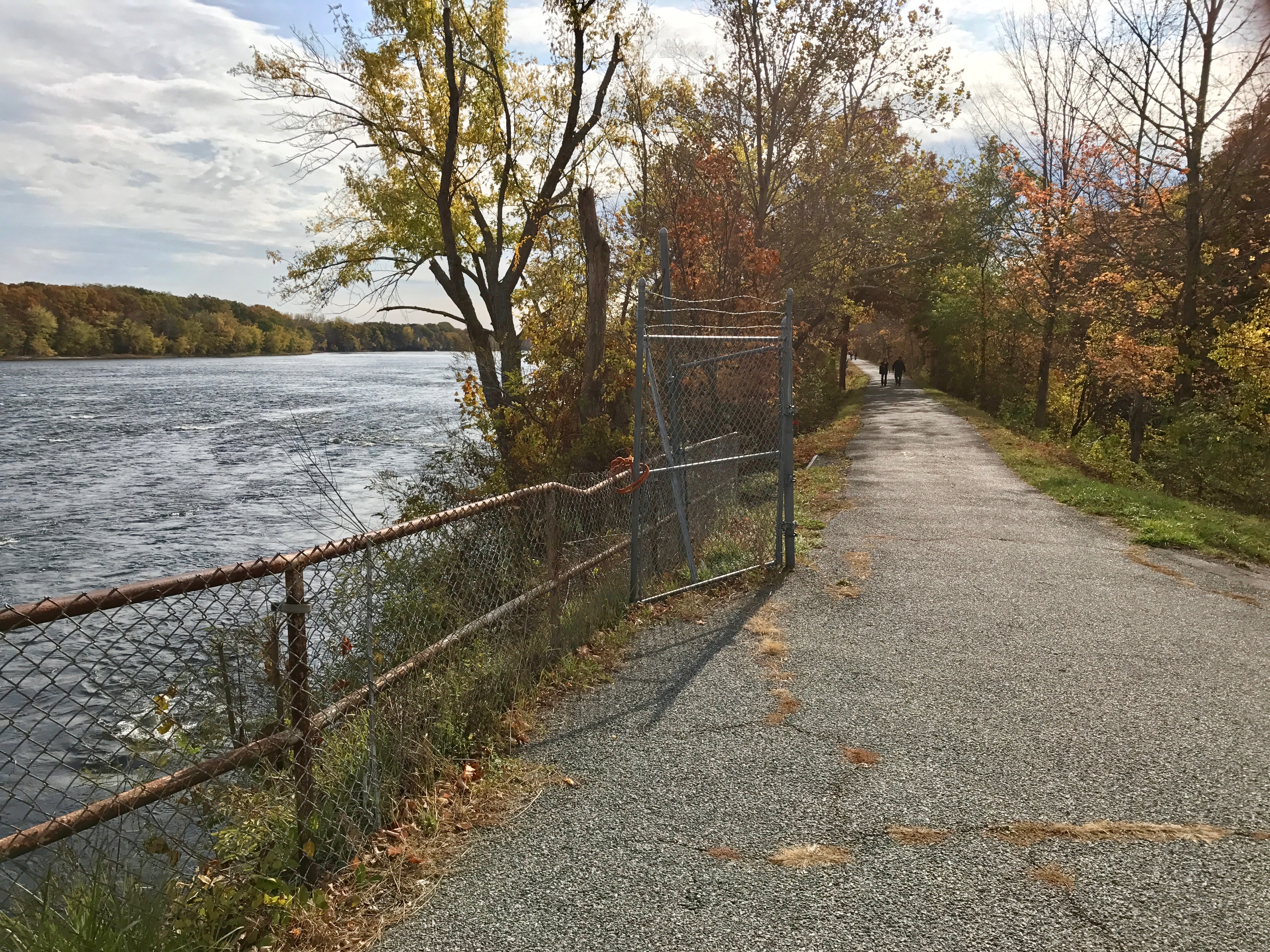
- Trail and Connecticut River looking south from the northern trail head in Suffield
- Length: 4.5 miles (7.2 km)
- Location: Hartford County, Connecticut, United States
- Designation: Connecticut state park
- Trailheads: Suffield and Windsor Locks
- Use: Hiking, biking, fishing
- Sights: Canal, Connecticut River
- Surface: Paved
- Maintainer: Connecticut Department of Energy and Environmental Protection
- Website: Official website

Windsor Locks Canal State Park Trail is a public recreation area that parallels the Connecticut River for 4.5 miles (7.2 km) between Suffield and Windsor Locks, Connecticut. The modern paved surface covers the original dirt towpath of the historic Enfield Falls Canal. The park is used for fishing, hiking, and biking.
