= Windsor Locks, Connecticut =

- Town
- Town of Windsor Locks
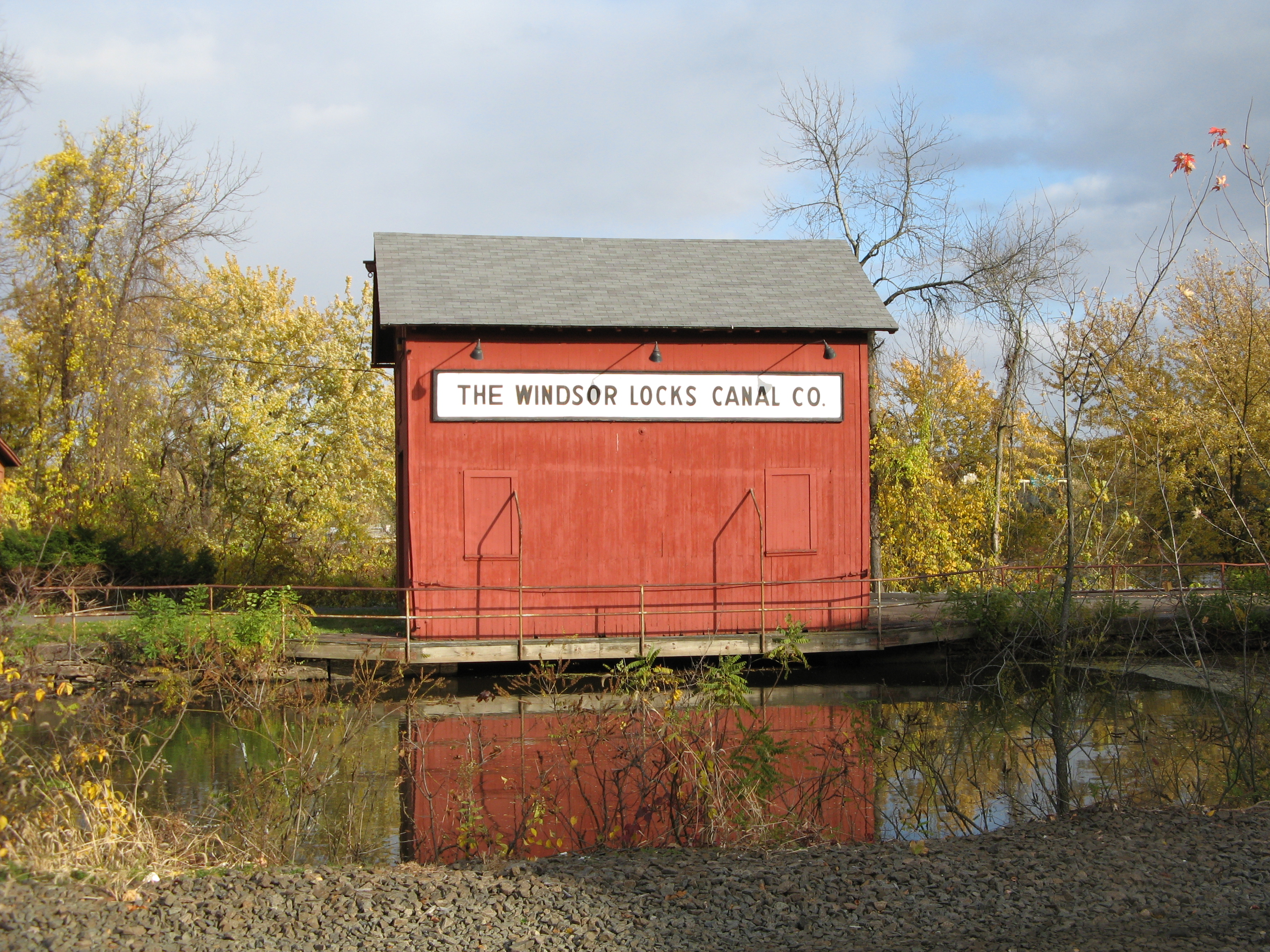
- The Windsor Locks Canal Company alongside the Enfield Falls Canal

- Seal

- Coordinates: 41°55′30″N 72°38′58″W
- Country: United States
- U.S. state: Connecticut
- County: Hartford
- Region: Capitol Region
- Settled: 1633
- Incorporated: 1854

Government
  - Type: Selectman-town meeting
  - First selectman: Jonathan W. Savino (D)
  - Selectman: Mark Whitten (D)
  - Selectman: James E. Cannon (R)

Area
  - Total: 9.4 sq mi (24.3 km^{2})
  - Land: 9.0 sq mi (23.4 km^{2})
  - Water: 0.35 sq mi (0.9 km^{2})
- Elevation: 157 ft (48 m)

Population (2020)
  - Total: 12,613
  - Density: 1,400/sq mi (539/km^{2})
- Time zone: UTC-5 (Eastern)
  - Summer (DST): UTC-4 (Eastern)
- ZIP Code: 06096
- Area codes: 860/959
- FIPS code: 09-87070
- GNIS feature ID: 0212355
- Website: www.windsorlocksct.org

Windsor Locks is a town in Hartford County, Connecticut, United States. The town is part of the Greater Hartford area. As of the 2020 census, its population was 12,613. It is the site of Bradley International Airport, which serves the Greater Hartford-Springfield region and occupies approximately a third of the town. Windsor Locks is also the site of the New England Air Museum.

Located beside the Connecticut River and equidistant from the densely populated cities of Springfield, Massachusetts, and Hartford, Connecticut, Windsor Locks is named for a set of canal locks that opened in 1829. Windsor Locks is situated just south of the first large falls in the Connecticut River, the Enfield Falls, which is the head of navigation (the farthest point that seagoing vessels can reach) of the Connecticut River. The Enfield Falls Canal circumvents the Enfield Falls and its nearby shallows.

== History ==
Originally part of Windsor, Windsor Locks incorporated as a separate town in 1854. It is named after the thriving Enfield Locks going around Enfield Falls, which opened in 1829. Bradley International Airport opened as a military base in 1940, and opened to civilian use in 1947. In 1967 the town boundary was altered due to the opening of the Bradley Airport Connector. The town boundary between Windsor Locks and Windsor changed several times and currently sits with Windsor Locks being on the westbound side and Windsor on the eastbound side of the median of CT Route 20.

=== 1965 Little League World Series Win ===
Led by Coach Russ Mattesen, Windsor Locks Little League advanced to the finals, competing against Stoney Creek Little League from Stoney Creek, Ontario, on August 28, 1965. Pitcher Mike Roche struck out 14 players, and Dale Misek struck a two-run home run to seal victory by a score of 3-1.

Windsor Locks Little League was then crowned the champion of the 1965 Little League World Series.

== Geography ==
According to the United States Census Bureau, the town has a total area of 9.4 square miles (24.3 km^{2}), of which 9.0 square miles (23.4 km^{2}) is land and 0.35 square miles (0.9 km^{2}), or 3.65%, is water.

=== Climate ===
Windsor Locks has a humid continental climate with hot and humid summer days to cold sometimes frigid winter nights. Average January temperature high is 36 °F (2.2 °C) and a low of 18 °F (−7.8 °C) temps can reach zero degrees or below 4 nights a year. Summer in Windsor Locks can be hot with the average July temperature of 87 °F (30.6 °C) at daytime and 63 °F (17.2 °C) at nighttime. Temperatures at or above 90 can occur 15 to 25 days per year. The hottest temperature at Windsor Locks was 103 °F (39.4 °C) on July 22, 2011, and the coldest recorded temperature was −26 °F (−32 °C) on January 22, 1961. Average rainfall in Windsor Locks is 46.27 inches.

== Demographics ==
Historical population
Census	Pop.	Note	%±
1860	1,587		—
1870	2,154		35.7%
1880	2,332		8.3%
1890	2,758		18.3%
1900	3,062		11.0%
1910	3,715		21.3%
1920	3,554		−4.3%
1930	4,073		14.6%
1940	4,347		6.7%
1950	5,221		20.1%
1960	11,411		118.6%
1970	15,080		32.2%
1980	12,190		−19.2%
1990	12,358		1.4%
2000	12,043		−2.5%
2010	12,498		3.8%
2020	12,613		0.9%
U.S. Decennial Census

As of the census of 2000, there were 12,043 people, 4,935 households, and 3,306 families residing in the town. The population density was 1,333.8 inhabitants per square mile (515.0/km^{2}). There were 5,101 housing units at an average density of 218.1 persons/km^{2} (565.0 persons/sq mi). The racial makeup of the town was 92.47% White, 2.67% African American, 0.12% Native American, 2.57% Asian, 0.00% Pacific Islander, 0.75% from other races, and 1.42% from two or more races. 2.22% of the population were Hispanic or Latino of any race.

There were 4,935 households, out of which 29.3% had children under the age of 18 living with them, 50.9% were married couples living together, 11.7% had a woman whose husband does not live with her, and 33.0% were non-families. 27.0% of all households were made up of individuals, and 11.3% had someone living alone who was 65 years of age or older. The average household size was 2.43 and the average family size was 2.97.

In the town, the population was spread out, with 23.7% under the age of 18, 6.2% from 18 to 24, 31.2% from 25 to 44, 22.5% from 45 to 64, and 16.5% who were 65 years of age or older. The median age was 39 years. For every 100 females, there were 94.2 males. For every 100 females age 18 and over, there were 92.1 males.

The median income for a household in the town was $48,837, and the median income for a family was $59,054. Males had a median income of $41,179 versus $33,641 for females. The per capita income for the town was $23,079. 4.4% of the population and 3.3% of families were below the poverty line. Out of the total people living in poverty, 4.5% were under the age of 18 and 4.7% were 65 or older.

== Economy ==
Until 2000, Windsor Locks was home to the oldest corporation listed on the New York Stock Exchange, the Dexter Corporation. Established in 1767 as C.H. Dexter and Sons, the company grew from a family-owned saw and grist mill and evolved into a multi-national producer of long fiber papers and chemical laminates. In its 233 years of operation, the company grew from manufacturing tissues, toilet paper, and tea bags to marketing more specialized products like medical garments and industrial finishes. Faced with a proposed buyout by International Specialty Products Incorporated in 2000, the Dexter Corporation separated its three divisions and sold them off to avoid a hostile takeover.

The Life Sciences division merged with Invitrogen Corporation. The Specialty Polymers division was sold in part to AkzoNobel, and the remaining businesses merged with Loctite Corporation. The third division, Dexter Nonwoven Materials, located on the company's original site in Windsor Locks, was sold to the Finnish Ahlstrom Paper Group. The physical plant continues to operate, with offices located nearby at 2 Elm Street. In 2011, the Home and Personal Nonwovens division of Ahlstrom Windsor Locks was sold to Suominen Corporation, also headquartered in Finland.

In 1952 Hamilton Standard opened its aircraft propeller plant in Windsor Locks. In 1999, Hamilton Standard merged with Sundstrand Corporation to become Hamilton Sundstrand, which is headquartered in Windsor Locks. Hamilton Sundstrand changed names to UTC Aerospace Systems before acquiring Rockwell Collins and forming Collins Aerospace in 2018.

On September 19, 2008, the Federal Reserve Bank of Boston ceased operations at Windsor Locks and moved them to the Federal Reserve Bank of Philadelphia.

== Education ==
Primary and secondary education falls under the oversight of Windsor Locks Public Schools. Windsor Locks contains five public schools for students in grades Pre-K3 to 12th grade and one transition academy for students age 18–21.

- North Street Elementary School: Pre-K3–2nd
- South Street Elementary School: 3rd–5th
- Windsor Locks Middle School: 6th–8th
- Windsor Locks High School (traditional): 9–12
- Pine Meadow Academy (alternative, Big Picture Learning Affiliate School): 9–12
- Rise Transition Academy: transition program from ages 18–21

== Government and politics ==
As of 2023, Windsor Locks is split into two House districts: the 60th represented by Jane Garibay (D) and the 61st represented by Tami Zawistowski (R).

Windsor Locks uses the selectman-town meeting system with an elected Board of Finance. Windsor Locks adopted the Windsor Locks Town Charter in 1981. Windsor Locks' Board of Selectman is composed of First Selectman Jonathan Savino (D), Selectman Mark Whitten (D), and Selectman James Cannon (R).

== Historical places ==
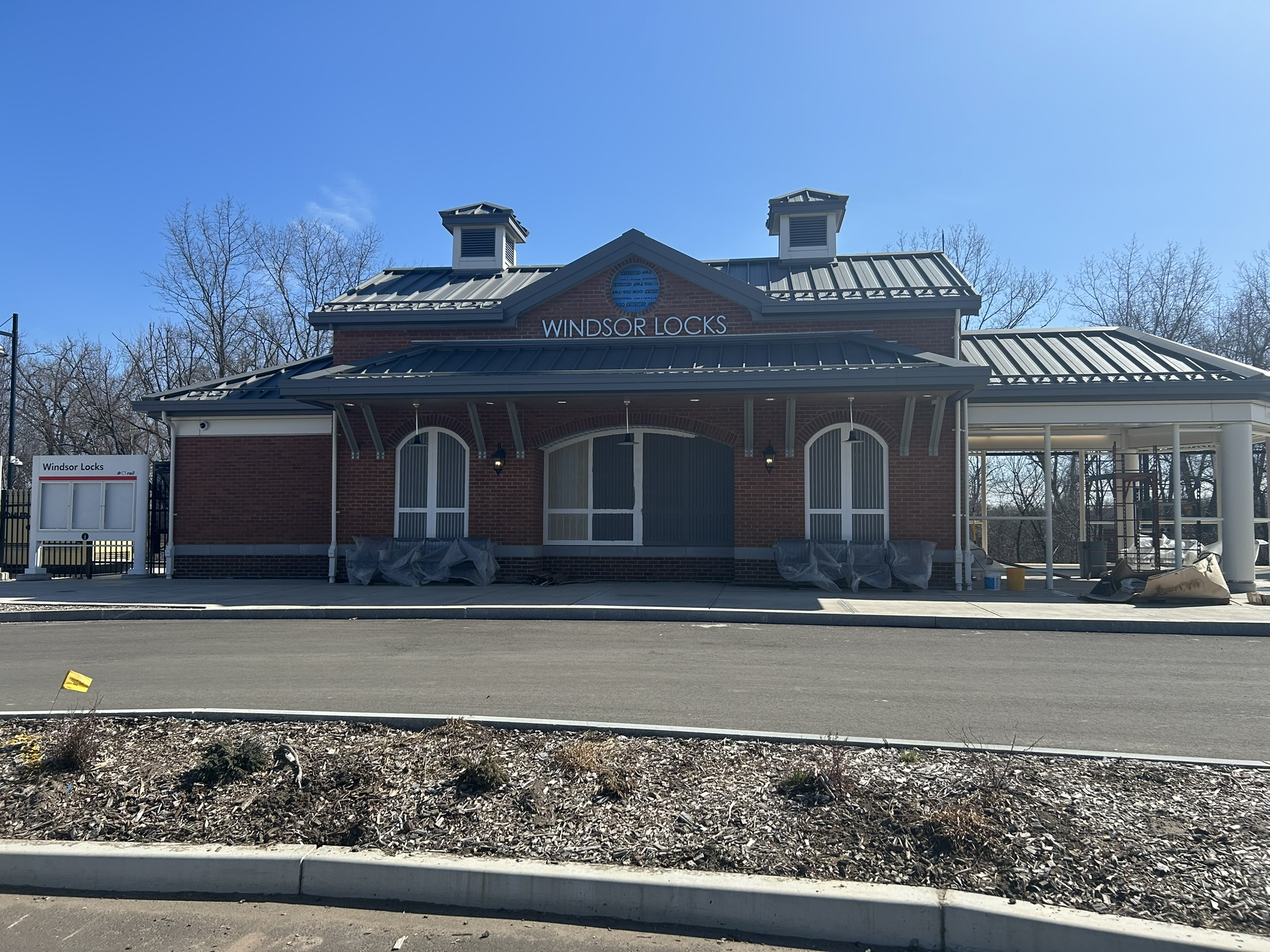
Windsor Locks station under construction in March 2026. The train station is served by the CT Rail Hartford Line and Amtrak, and is part of the bus route to Bradley International Airport. It replaced the 1981-built station on October 18, 2026.

The following places in Windsor Locks are on the National Register of Historic Places.

- David Pinney House and Barn – 58 West Street (added August 25, 1977)
- Enfield Falls Canal – along Connecticut River from Windsor Locks north to Suffield CT at a location directly across the Connecticut River from Thompsonville (added May 22, 1976)
- J. R. Montgomery Company Industrial Complex – 25 Canal Bank Road (added December 31, 2017)
- Memorial Hall – Intersection of South Main and Elm Streets (added July 2, 1987)
- Windsor Locks Passenger Station – Main Street (added October 2, 1975)

== Notable people ==
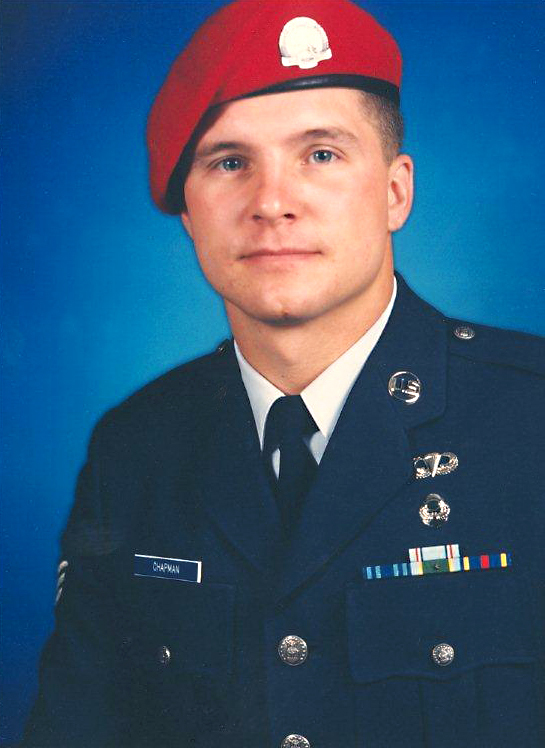
Senior Airman John Chapman, recipient of the Medal of Honor

- John A. Chapman (1965–2002), US Air Force Combat Controller, posthumously awarded the Medal of Honor
- Ella Grasso, 83rd Governor of Connecticut
- Henry Molaison (1926–2008), American patient who suffered from life-threatening epilepsy and therefore got his medial temporal lobe surgically removed, and as a tragic consequence of this life-saving treatment, developed anterograde amnesia.
- Kathryn Morris, American actress, best known for her lead role as Detective Lilly Rush in the CBS series Cold Case
- Kim Zolciak, television personality, best known for The Real Housewives of Atlanta and Don't Be Tardy

== See also ==
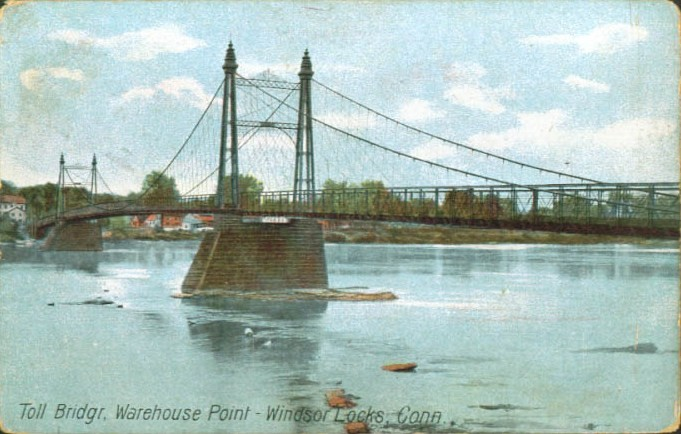
Toll bridge over the Connecticut River, c. 1910

- Bradley International Airport
- Windsor Locks station
- New England Air Museum
- FlightSimCon
