= Old Red Bridge =

Former bridge in Massachusetts, United States

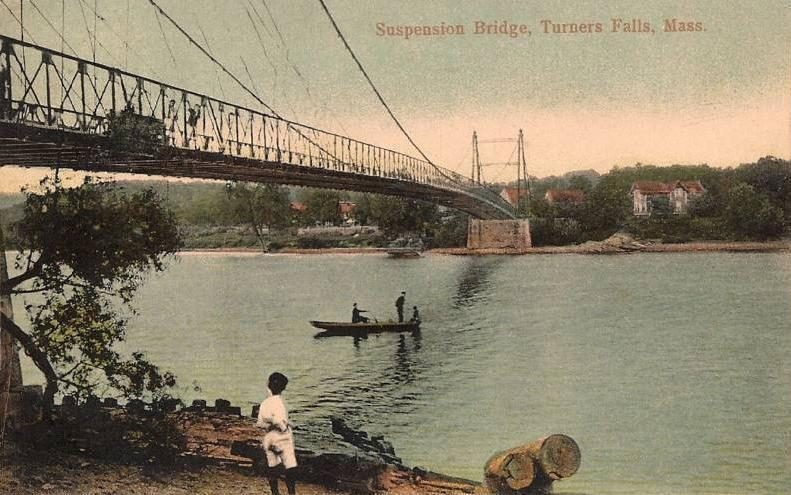
- Postcard of the bridge (1907)
- Coordinates: 42°36′27″N 72°32′58″W
- Crossed: Connecticut River
- Locale: Gill and Turners Falls

Characteristics
- Design: Cable-stayed suspension bridge
- Longest span: 550 ft (170 m)

History
- Constructed by: New York Bridge Co.
- Construction cost: US$42,000
- Opened: 1878
- Demolished: 1942
- Red Bridge Anchorage
- U.S. Historic district – Contributing property
- Part of: Riverside Village Historic District (ID100001617)
- Designated CP: September 18, 2017

Location
- Interactive map of Old Red Bridge

Old Red Bridge, originally known as Red Bridge and the Upper Suspension Bridge, was a cable-stayed suspension bridge crossing the Connecticut River between the town of Gill with the village of Turners Falls in Franklin County, Massachusetts. The bridge opened in 1878 and was demolished in 1942. An anchorage remaining from the bridge was spared from demolition in 1985 when Gill residents voted to preserve the structure, which contained rare armored mud balls that had been discovered by a local geology professor. Old Red Bridge was subsequently designated as a state historic civil engineering landmark and its anchorage is a contributing structure within the Riverside Village Historic District.

== History ==
=== Background ===
The Red Bridge replaced a ferry that had operated across this segment of the Connecticut River since 1792, when the first dam at Turners Falls was constructed across the river. Before that, a ferry had operated further upstream to avoid rapids that had existed at the site and were eliminated by the dam.

In 1872, the White Bridge was constructed downstream of the dam (on the site of the current Turners Falls Road Bridge), providing a connection between Turners Falls and Greenfield. It was the second suspension bridge in Franklin County. The Red Bridge was built six years later upstream of the dam, providing a faster way to cross the river between Turners Falls and Gill compared to the ferry. The White Bridge was also later referred to as the "Lower Suspension Bridge" to distinguish it from the Red Bridge—also known as the "Upper Suspension Bridge"—that was built further upstream.

=== Construction and opening ===
Construction of the Red Bridge began in May 1878. The abutment and anchorage on the north end of the bridge were laid on rock foundations while piles had to be driven for the foundations supporting the abutment and anchorage on the south end of the bridge because rock was located 30 feet (9.1 m) below the surface. The bridge's towers were completed by September, cables were laid across the bridge beginning in October, and the installation of flooring began in November. The bridge opened in December 1878. Horse teams were initially allowed to cross the bridge at nights and on Sundays, while pedestrian foot traffic was permitted at all times. The bridge was fully open by January 1879.

At the time of completion, the 550-foot (170 m) long span was the fifth longest suspension bridge in the United States. The Red Bridge was constructed at a cost of $42,000 and was designed to accommodate four times the load of the White Bridge. Both the Red and White bridges used a hybrid cable-stayed suspension bridge design developed by John A. Roebling that combed elements of cable-stayed and suspension bridges, with both vertical and diagonal suspender cables (similar to the Brooklyn Bridge). The Red Bridge was constructed by the New York Bridge Co. (also known as Hutchinson & Shipman) and used wires and cables manufactured by Roebling's company. The construction contract implied that Roebling's company was also involved in the bridge's structural design.

The opening of the Red Bridge resulted in a growth of residential development of Gill, which was used as a suburb for workers in Turners Falls. It also increased commerce between the two locales, with farms in Gill exporting their products to Turners Falls.

=== Deterioration and demolition ===
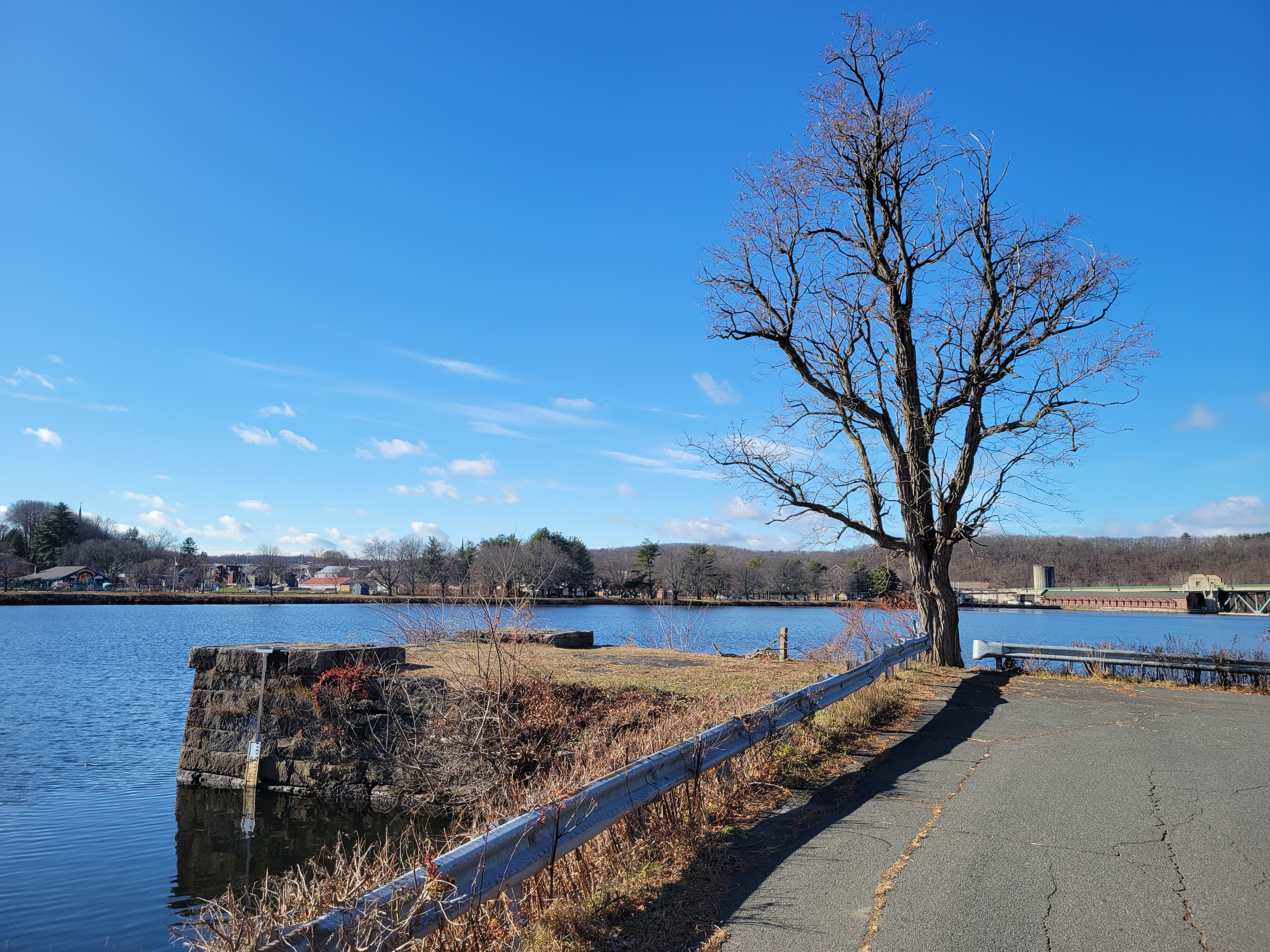
A former bridge abutment in 2024, with Turners Falls–Gill Bridge in the background

In its early years, the Red Bridge only required periodic repairs to replace its flooring; however, by the early 1930s, deterioration of the structure restricted traffic and only one vehicle was able to cross the span at a time. Limited load capacities on both the Red and White bridges led officials to call for the replacement of both structures with a new bridge in 1933. A flood in March 1936, which destroyed the Montague City Covered Bridge and temporarily shut down the Red Bridge, prompted the state to construct a new bridge. The Turners Falls–Gill Bridge was completed in September 1938 as a replacement to the Red and White bridges. The Red Bridge was subsequently closed to vehicular traffic on November 28, 1938, but remained open for use by pedestrians.

The Red Bridge was demolished in 1942 to provide scrap metal for the World War II effort. As part of the demolition work, one of the stone abutments on the north end of the bridge was removed and Postal Telegraph Company wires across the span were relocated.

=== Preservation of anchorage ===
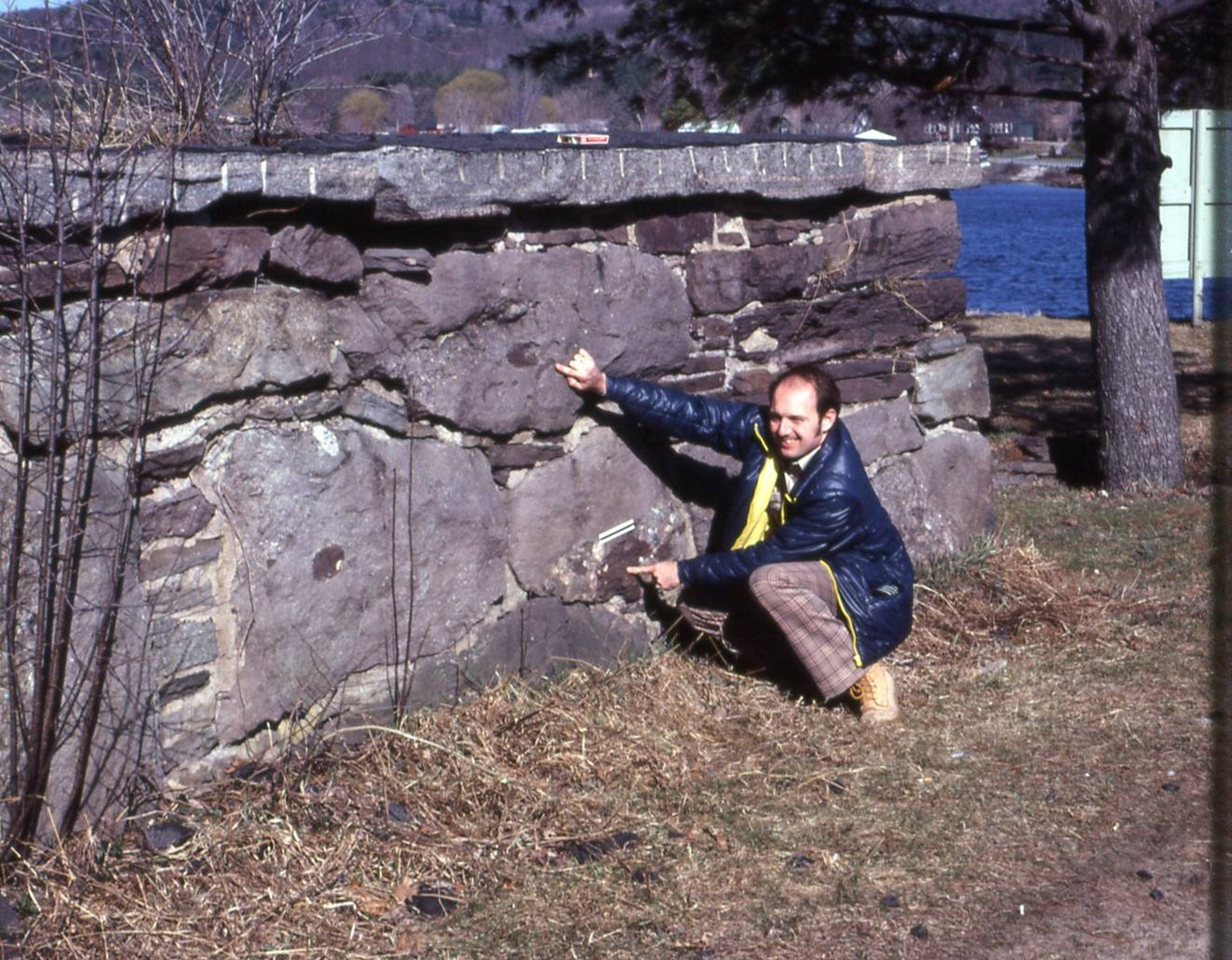
Professor Little pointing to armored mud balls he discovered in Unity Park

In the early 1970s, Richard Little, a geology professor at Greenfield Community College, discovered armored mud balls in the anchorage of Old Red Bridge in Turners Falls' Unity Park. He later found additional armored mud balls in the surrounding area, including ones in other sandstone blocks used for the construction of Old Red Bridge and in stratigraphic sections of exposed rock located below the dam. Little originally assumed that other geologists had previously found the armored mud balls, but upon doing further research he found that they had not been discovered. They were also rare and had only been found in eight locations in the world.

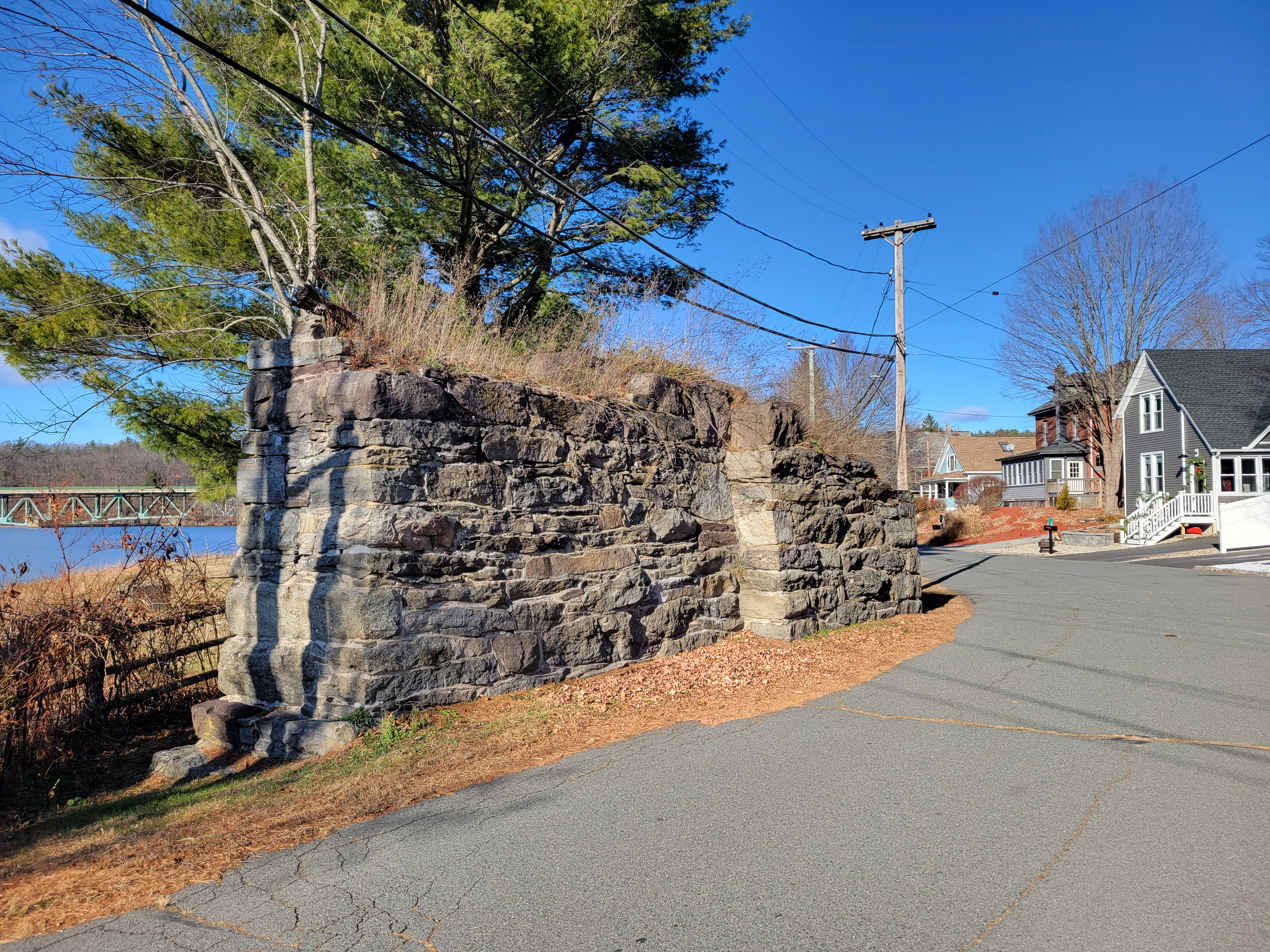
The preserved anchorage located on Gill's Riverview Drive in 2024

In April 1985, the Town of Gill planned to remove the anchorage on the north side of the bridge to improve visibility for motorists driving along the road that runs next to it and to eliminate what some people considered to be an "eyesore." However, their efforts were temporarily stopped by Theresa Rice, a resident that lived 25 feet (7.6 m) away from the structure, who cited the rare nature of the geological formations contained within the structure. She urged the town's board of selectmen to keep the anchorage, gaining support from her neighbors and the Gill Historical Commission as well as backing from other scientists. After debate, residents of the town voted to keep the structure and the Gill Bridge Street Anchorage Preservation Committee was formed to beautify the anchorage and recognize its historic significance.

At the request of the committee, a curator from the Smithsonian Institution visited the anchorage in July 1985 and noted its local and regional historic significance. The committee researched the structure and hoped to designate it as a state historic civil engineering landmark. Upon learning about the Gill's efforts to save the anchorage, members of the History and Heritage Committee of the Boston Society of Civil Engineers nominated the Old Red Bridge as a historic civil engineering landmark, an effort which was supported by the town's board of selectmen.

The former bridge was designated as a Massachusetts Historic Civil Engineering Landmark by the American Society of Civil Engineers in 1990. A bronze plaque marking the designation was installed on the remaining anchorage in Gill and dedicated on May 10, 1991 along with a ceremony held at another historic bridge in Franklin County that had also been designated as a state historic civil engineering landmark—the Bardwell's Ferry Bridge over the Deerfield River between the towns of Shelburne and Conway. A mural of the former bridge and a historical marker for the Riverside Village Historic District are also located near the anchorage. The Red Bridge anchorage is included as a contributing structure to the historic district.

== See also ==
- List of crossings of the Connecticut River
