= Riverside Village Historic District =

Historic district in Massachusetts, United States

- U.S. National Register of Historic Places
- U.S. Historic district
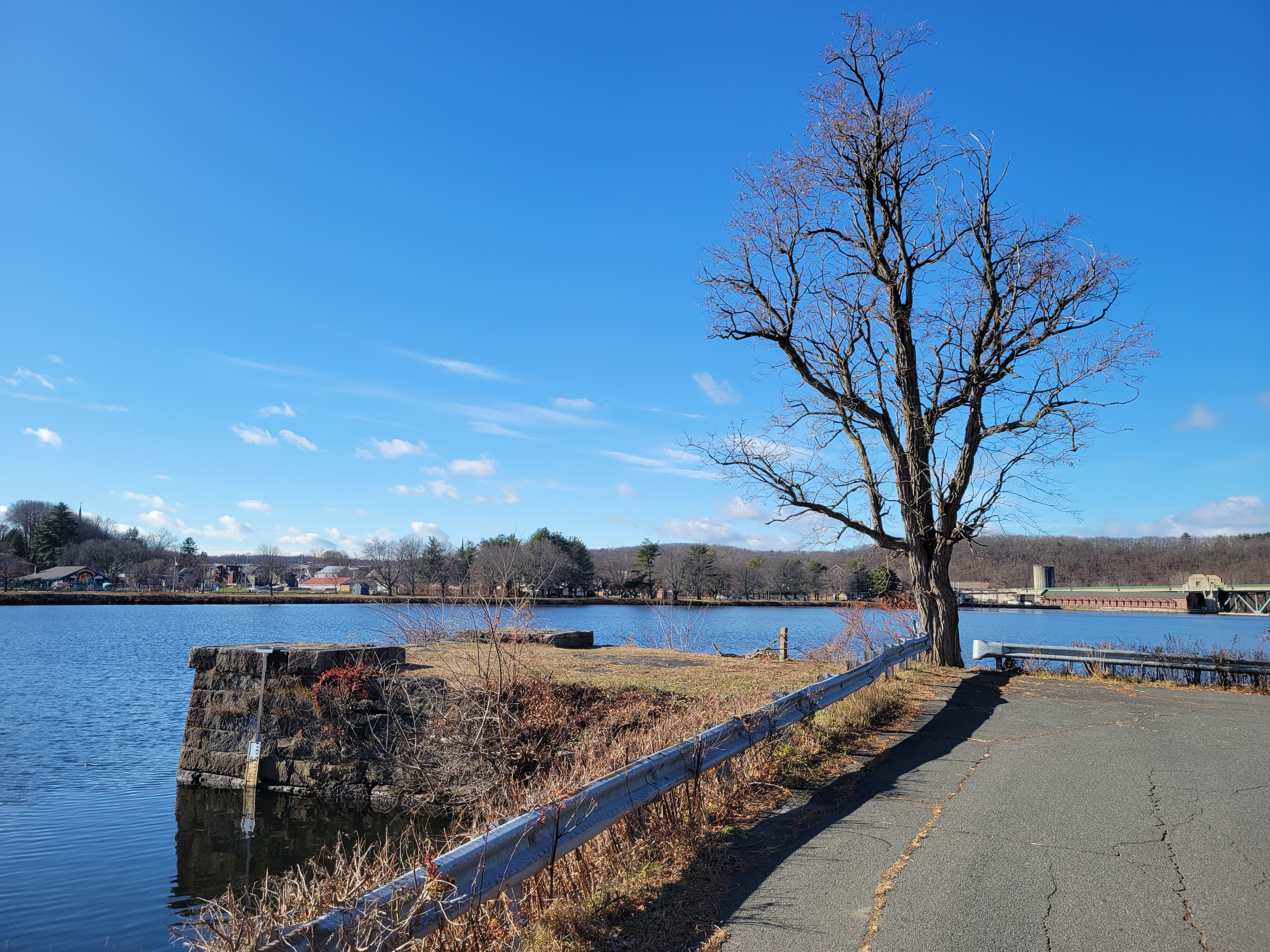
- Red Suspension Bridge Abutment

- Location within Massachusetts Location within the United States
- Location: 0-77 French King Hwy., 0-61 Riverview Dr., 1-9 Grove, 2-9 Myrtle, 8 Meadow, 2-23 Oak, 1-4 Pine & 3-32 Walnut Sts., Gill, Massachusetts
- Coordinates: 42°36′41″N 72°32′52″W
- NRHP reference No.: 100001617
- Added to NRHP: September 18, 2017

The Riverside Village Historic District encompasses a village community near Massachusetts Route 2 in Gill, Massachusetts. The district was listed on the National Register of Historic Places in 1992.

== Description and history ==
Colonial settlement of what is now the town of Gill began in the mid-18th century, and the town was incorporated in 1794. Riverside, located on the northern bank of the Connecticut River, now opposite the 19th-century industrial village of Turners Falls, was its first point of settlement. The oldest surviving building in Gill is the Howland Tavern, built about 1760 and now set on the south side of the French King Highway (Massachusetts Route 2). In the early 19th century sawmills were erected along the river, which produced lumber used in the development of Gill and neighboring communities. When Turners Falls was developed later in the 19th century, Riverside was economically eclipsed, and became a place for workers there to live. The Turners Falls Lumber Company, located in Riverside, burned down in 1903, and its site was never redeveloped.

The historic district is roughly bounded on the north by the French King Highway and the south by the river. A network of mainly residential streets is clustered southwest of the highway and the Gill–Montague Bridge, built in 1937-38 as a replacement for an older failing suspension bridge. Most of the buildings in the district are modest frame houses. They are built in a diversity of styles, representing the shifts in fortunes of the community and its industries. Notable non-residential buildings include a c. 1920 gas station, a 1926 schoolhouse, and a vegetable stand built in the 1940s to serve traffic passing on the highway.

== See also ==
- National Register of Historic Places listings in Franklin County, Massachusetts
