= Armored mud ball =

Sedimentary structure

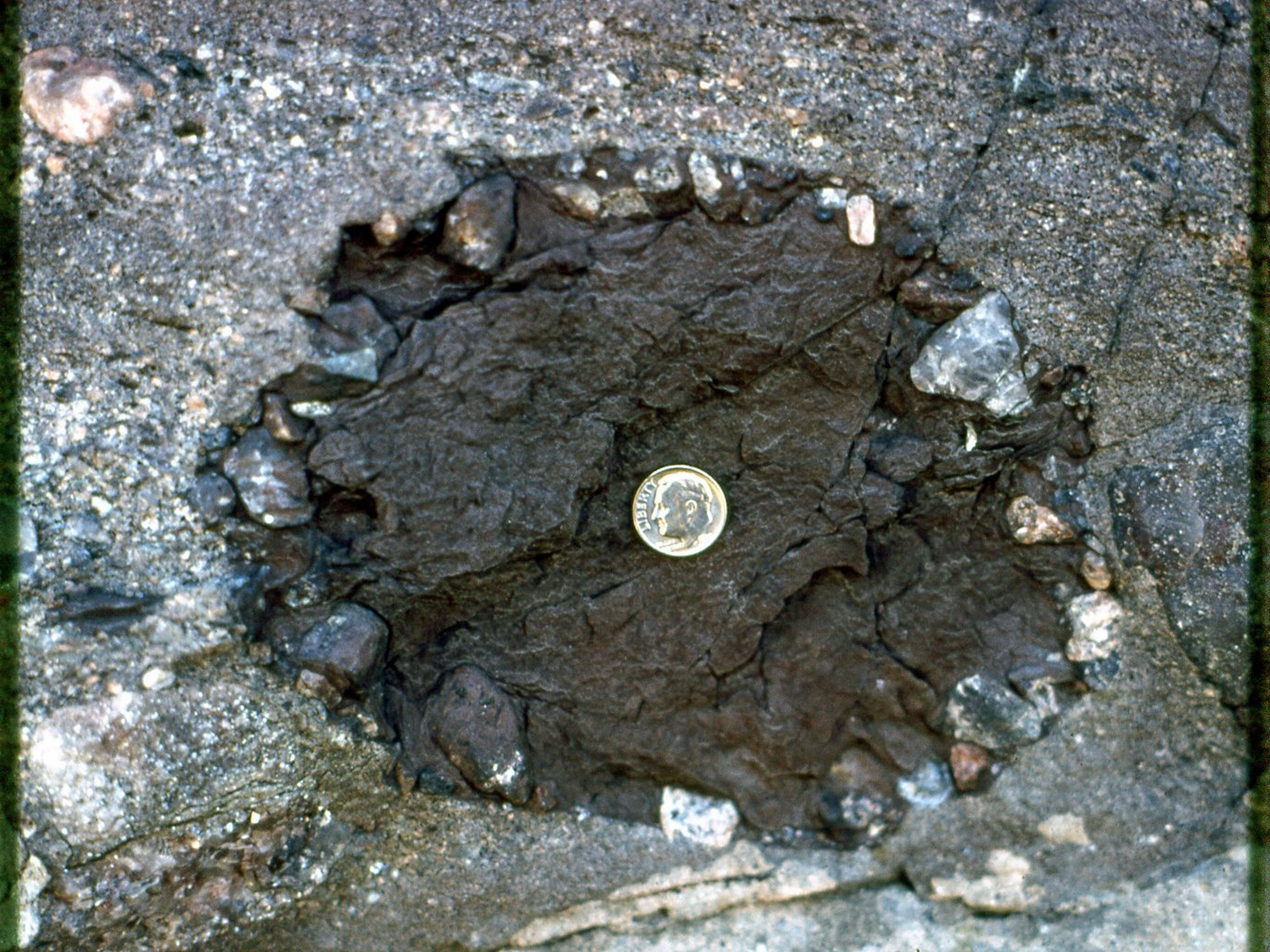
A Jurassic lithified armored mud ball, with a dime (17.9 mm diameter) for scale.

An armored mud ball is a small sedimentary structure, formed in flowing water, which consists of a fragment of clay or mud that has been rolled by currents into a spherical shape, and which then becomes coated in a layer of sand, gravel or pebbles that serves to protect (armor) it against further breakdown. Armored mud balls can vary in size from less than a centimeters up to 50 centimeters in diameter. Typically, they are between 5 and 10 centimeters in diameter. Mud balls are known to form in many parts of the world, and armored mud balls can form in river, lake or marine environments.

Under circumstances of rapid burial, armored mud balls can become incorporated into other sediments which subsequently form sedimentary rocks. Exposures of these lithified armored mud balls are very rare, but are known from a small number of locations around the world.

== Etymology ==
The name "pudding balls" was originally given to these structures by geologist Lon D. Cartwright Jr. in 1928. However, because the pebbles that protect them are not spread evenly throughout the clay body, but are found only on the outer surface, the name 'armored mud ball' was proposed in 1940 by geologist Hugh Stevens Bell, and has since been widely adopted.

== Formation ==
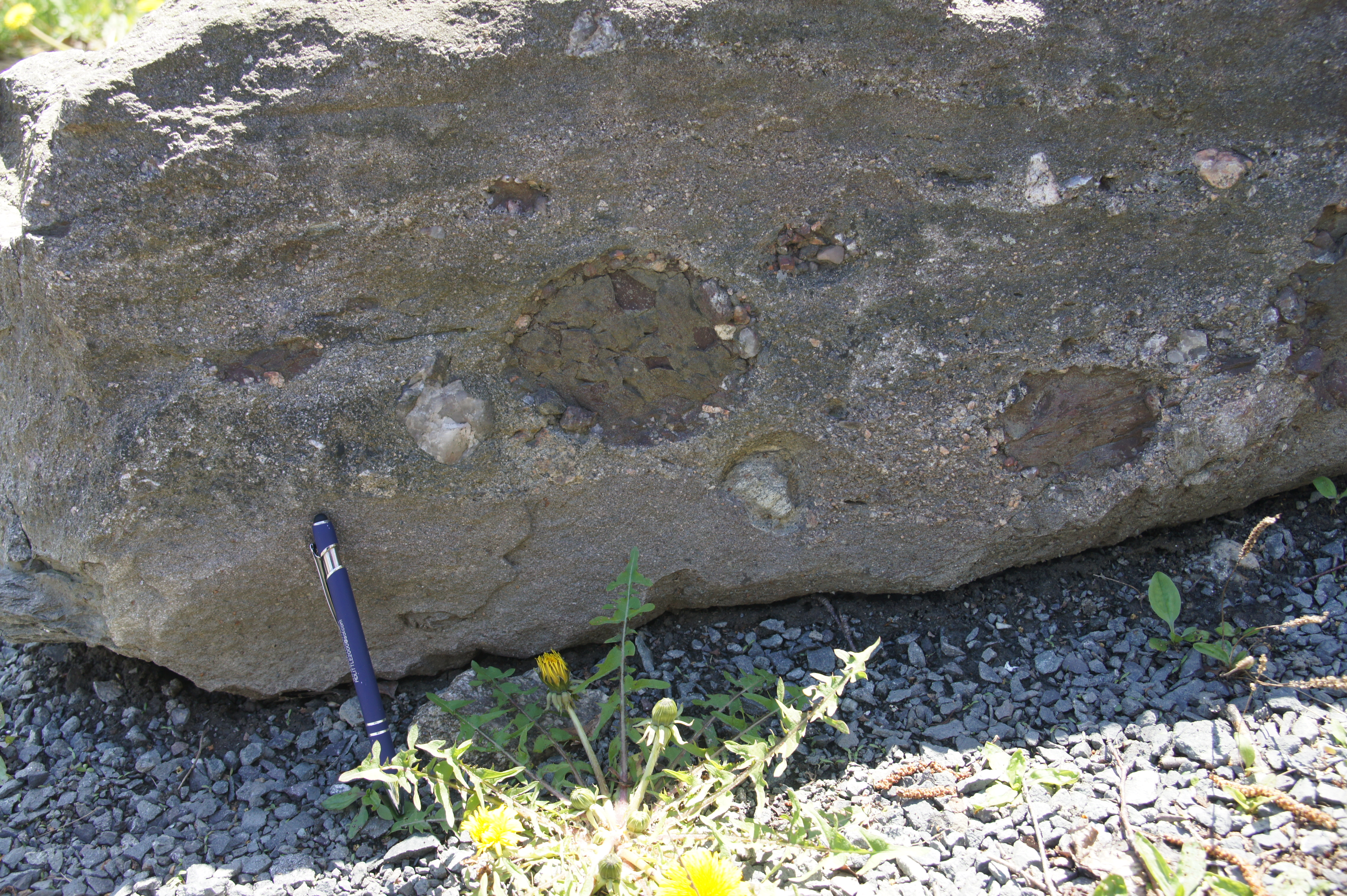
Lithified armored mud balls in the Jurassic-aged Turners Falls Formation, Turners Falls, Massachusetts

=== Pre-lithification ===
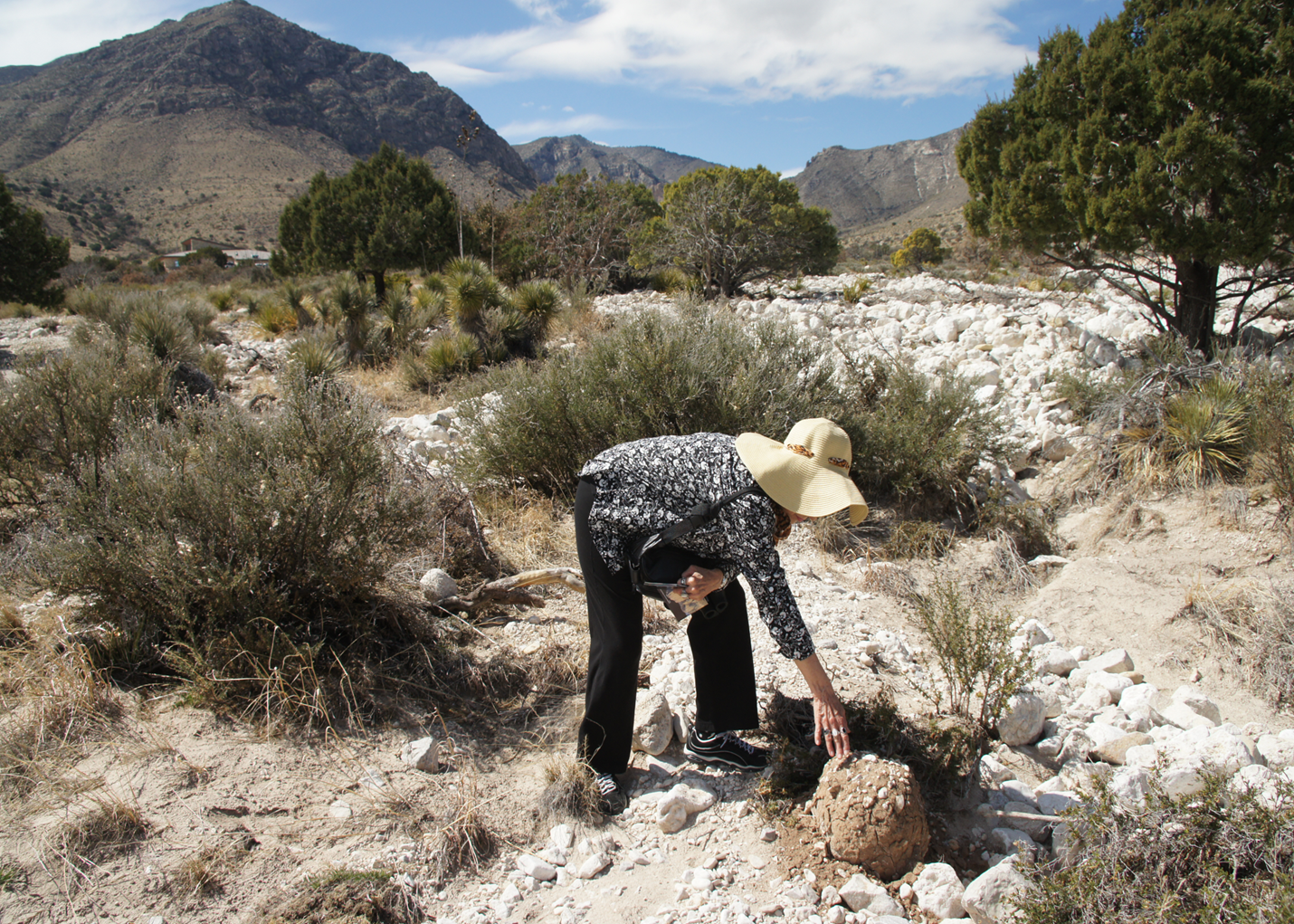
Non-lithified armored mud ball in Guadalupe Mountains National Park, 2015

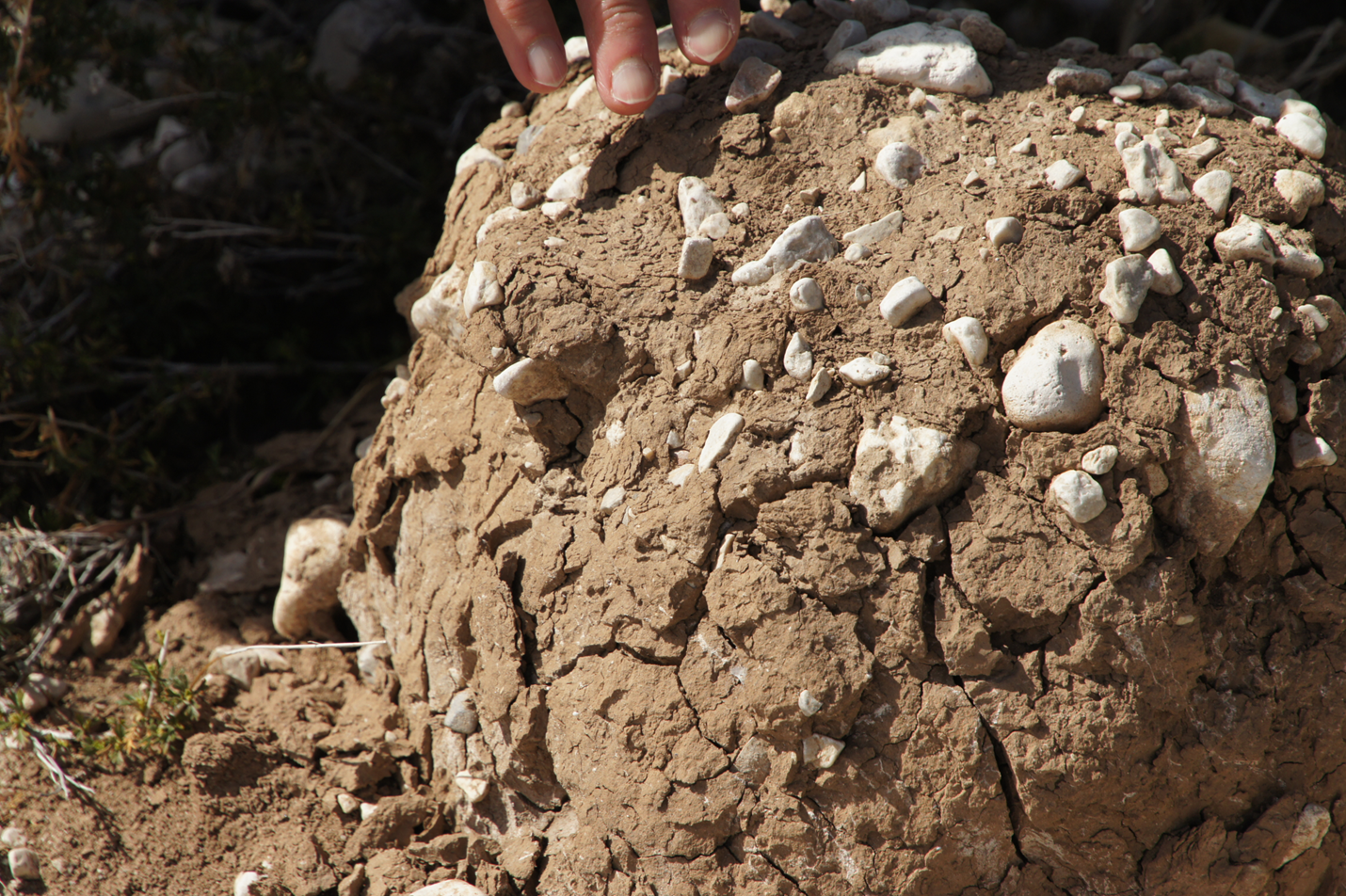
Close-up of non-lithified armored mud ball

In the early 20th century, James Gardner hypothesized that these structures formed by the accumulation of fine clay particles as they flowed along a stream, gradually building up concentric rings of sediments by adhesion until their weight eventually stopped them rolling with the current. That view held sway for some 20 years, despite an earlier suggestion in 1875 by Jones and King that those mud balls found on beaches had formed from broken off fragments of clay from adjacent cliffs which had then been rolled by wave action.

By 1940 it was generally accepted that their formation was due to rolling of broken off fragments of clay and not to concretion.

Armored mud balls are derived from fragments of clay or mud that get broken off from their original sediment layers deposits by erosion, commonly in places such as sea cliffs or the cut bank of a river. The mud fragments are washed and rolled by flowing water and become covered in larger particles from the bed of the watercourse. The particles, typically sand or pebbles, form an "armor" that allows the mud ball to retain its shape during transport. This is especially important for armored mud balls that form in deep-ocean sediment flows known as turbidity currents, where fragments of mud initially eroded from submarine canyons become coated with a sand armor that allows them to travel for tens of kilometers without being destroyed. Armored mud balls formed by wave action in beach environments can sometimes carry an armor of seashell fragments instead of pebbles.

=== Lithification ===
Despite their name, armored mud balls are typically quite fragile and often disintegrate after drying out, making them a rare occurrence in the geologic record. However, if armored mud balls are buried quickly, there is a chance that they may become lithified along with their entombing sediment and get preserved for millions of years. The mud balls themselves are preserved as small chunks of mudstone or siltstone surrounded by a ring of pebbles.

== Examples ==
Teichert & Kummel (1972) described armored mud balls from the Kap Stosch area of East Greenland. These specimens were unusual because their cores had been eroded, but part of the armor included fossils that had been eroded from older layers and redeposited along with the armored mud balls in Triassic sediments.

Richter (1926) found an armored mud ball from Eocene age sediments near Vienna, Austria.

Cartwright (1928) described "pudding balls" from the Pliocene Pico Formation of the Ventura Quadrangle, California.

Kugler & Saunders (1959) mention armored mud balls from the Miocene of Trinidad, the Eocene of Ecuador, and the Jurassic of Spitsbergen. The Spitsbergen examples have shell fragments for armor, indicating they formed in a beach environment.

Stanley (1964) described armored mud balls in Eocene submarine channel deposits from France.

Little (1982) discovered very well-preserved armored mud balls in alluvial fan deposits of the Lower Jurassic Turners Falls Sandstone from Turners Falls, Massachusetts. A total of 25 armored mud balls were found in quarried sandstone blocks that used to serve as cable anchors for a now-defunct suspension bridge over the Connecticut River. Subsequent investigations by Little revealed more armored mud balls from the Turners Falls Formation in the towns of Turners Falls and Gill, as well as the Upper Triassic Sugarloaf Formation in the towns of Greenfield and Deerfield, Massachusetts. The examples from the Connecticut River Valley of Western Massachusetts are particularly notable because they are among the most well-preserved and easily accessible lithified armored mud balls in the world.

== See also ==
- Mudstone – Fine grained sedimentary rock whose original constituents were clays or muds
- Siltstone – Sedimentary rock which has a grain size in the silt range
- Rip-up clasts – Pieces of clay or mud removed by currents
- Sea balls – Group of aquatic phenomena
