= Riverside Archeological District =

Historic district in Massachusetts, United States

- U.S. National Register of Historic Places
- U.S. Historic district
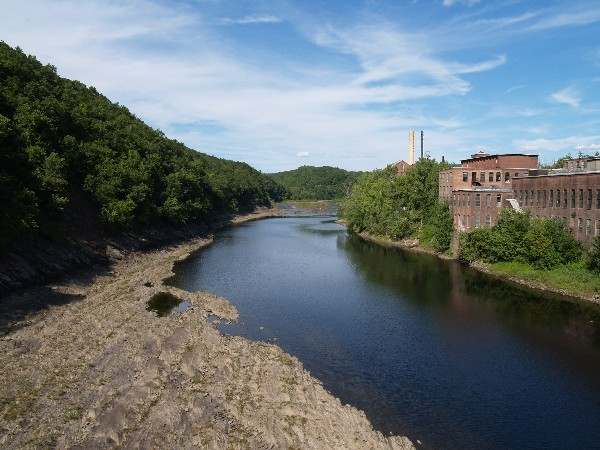
- Portions of the district are visible on the left side of this photograph
- Nearest city: Gill and Greenfield, Massachusetts
- NRHP reference No.: 75000256
- Added to NRHP: July 9, 1975

The Riverside Archeological District is a historic archaeological site in Gill and Greenfield, Massachusetts. The site added to the National Register of Historic Places in 1975.

== Site description ==
The Riverside Archeological District encompasses a sizable tract of land north of Turners Falls, a major whitewater rapids on the Connecticut River, north of the eponymous village of Turners Falls, Massachusetts in Gill and Greenfield. Located in northern Massachusetts near the mouths of four major tributaries to the Connecticut, the area has an archaeological history known to date back to the late Pleistocene. During the earliest contacts between European colonists and Native Americans in the 17th century, the area was known to house major Native encampments, and was the site of the 1676 Battle of Turner's Falls in King Philip's War. The area has been recognized has archaeologically significant since the 19th century, with well-attested accounts of small finds and some distinctive burial sites.

Formalized archaeology in the area began in the early 20th century with the accumulation of artifacts from Gill in 1915 and 1916 that are now in the collection of the American Indian Archaeological Institute in Washington, DC. It has continued at low levels of activity throughout the 20th century.

== Boundaries ==
The western boundary of the site is roughly Adams Road in Greenfield; the eastern boundary is in the Lily's Pond area of Barton Cove in Gill, a sheltered area of the Connecticut River. The northern boundary is just north of Riverside Cemetery in Gill, and the southernmost portion of the area may extend just across the river into the village of Turners Falls.

== See also ==
- Dedic Site, in South Deerfield
- National Register of Historic Places listings in Franklin County, Massachusetts
