= Robert E. Bourdeau =

American physicist

Robert Eugene Bourdeau
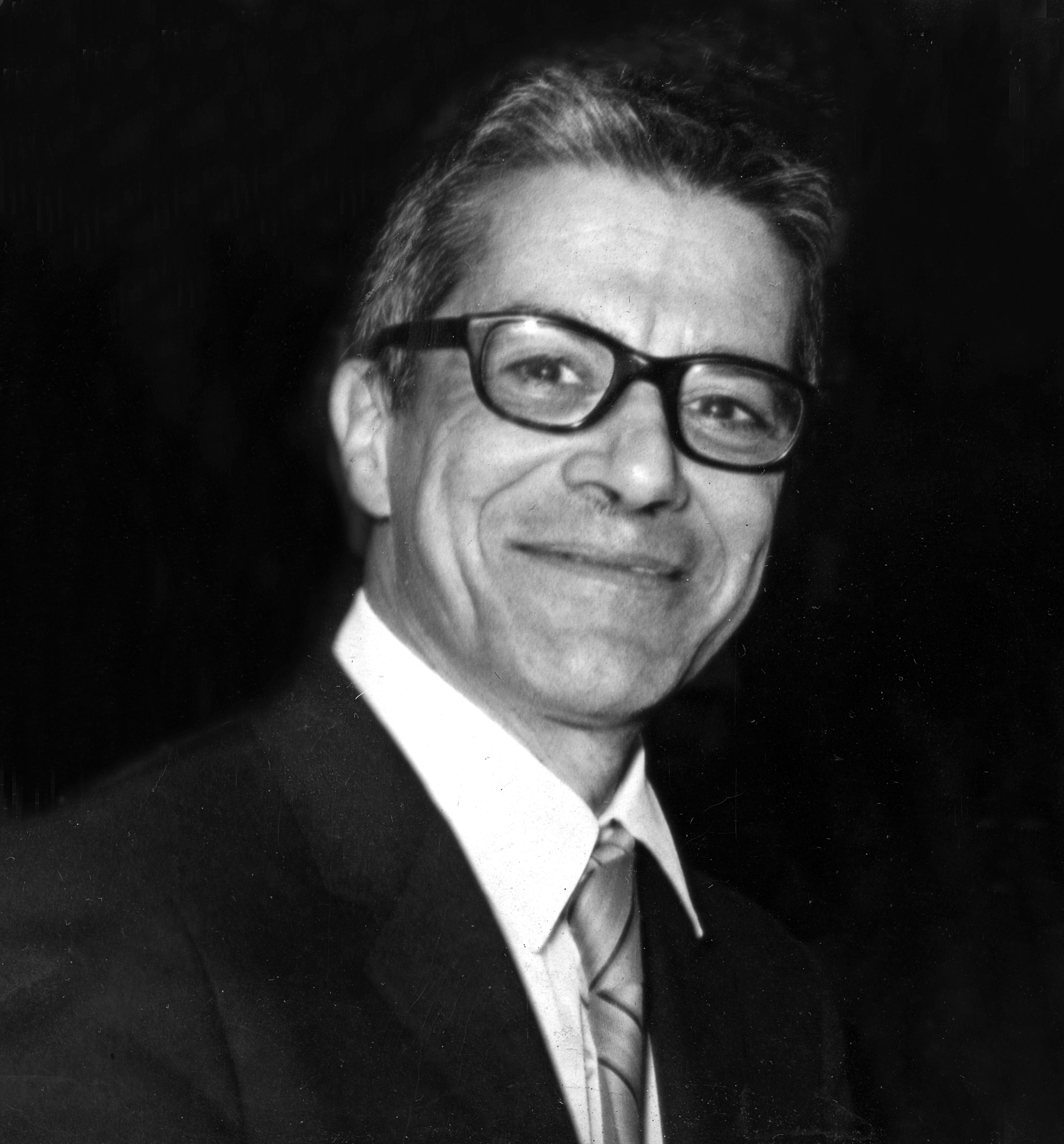
- Born: February 1, 1922; Turners Falls, Massachusetts
- Died: March 5, 2010 (aged 88); Laurel, Maryland
- Resting place: St. Anne's Cemetery, Turners Falls, Massachusetts
- Education: University of Massachusetts (B.S.)
- Spouses: Claire Estelle Baldwin, Lucille Lioy Loche
- Children: Michele Ann, Robert Roland
- Scientific career
- Fields: Ionosphere, plasma physics, radio science
- Workplaces: Naval Research Laboratory, National Aeronautics and Space Administration

Robert Eugene Bourdeau (February 1, 1922 – March 5, 2010) was an American physicist known for major contributions to the study of the ionosphere, plasma physics and radio science using space vehicles including satellites and rockets. Among his many achievements was the launch on November 3, 1960, of Explorer 8 from Cape Canaveral, Florida. This occurred during his 16-year career at the National Aeronautics and Space Administration (NASA). He was both Project Manager and Project Scientist for Explorer 8 which added significant knowledge to the understanding of these fields.

Prior to his career at NASA Bourdeau worked at the Naval Research Laboratory and participated in the historic post-war V-2 rocket program at the White Sands Proving Ground. There he began his research into the ionosphere. After the V-2 program ended around 1946, Bourdeau concentrated mainly on Department of Defense classified research that included studies of atmospheric electricity.

== Biography ==
=== Early years ===
Bourdeau was born on February 2, 1922, in Turners Falls, Massachusetts, the fifth of eight children of Rosanna (Dubois) and Stanislaus Bourdeau. Stanislaus was born in Montreal, Canada and Rosanna was also of French Canadian descent. Their eight children included the oldest, daughter Doris and seven sons. All the children attended St. Anne's elementary school, which was a French/English bilingual school. Robert Bourdeau graduated from Turners Falls High School in 1939 and went on to study physics at the University of Massachusetts in Amherst. In addition to his physics studies, he played right wing on the soccer team. He graduated with a Bachelor of Science degree in physics in 1943.

Bourdeau's three older brothers (Roland, Joseph and Edward) and two of his younger brothers (Francis and Bernard) served in the Army during World War II. His youngest brother Paul served in the Air Force in England in the 1950s.

=== Navy service ===
While in college, Bourdeau contacted the United States Navy with the intention of serving during World War II. He was encouraged to finish his education because the Navy needed physicists. Upon his graduation, he was commissioned an Ensign in the United States Navy and would eventually achieve the rank of Lieutenant. He immediately joined the Naval Research Laboratory (NRL) in Washington, D.C. During this phase of his career, Bourdeau worked on anti-submarine warfare including defense against the Henschel Hs 293, a German anti-ship guided missile. He resigned his commission when the war ended in 1945 and joined the Naval Research Laboratory as a civilian employee.

=== Naval Research Laboratory career ===
==== Rocket Sonde Branch ====
In January 1946 the Naval Research Laboratory formed the Rocket Sonde Branch (RSB) in part to establish itself as a "research institution of the highest caliber" under Ernst Henry Krause. Bourdeau was part of the initial core group of the RSB along with Milton Rosen, Gilbert Jerome Perlow and Homer E. Newell Jr. Krause put Milt Rosen in charge of the development of a sounding rocket for use in the research into the ionosphere. They anticipated that development of the rocket would take two years. This was Project Viking.

The most manpower and highest priority were given to a team charged with the study of the radio propagation characteristics of the ionosphere, an area Bourdeau would continue to pursue in following years. This team was headed at various times by John F. Clark and T. Robert Burnight.

==== V-2 Research at NRL ====
After the war, the Army began the V-2 rocket program using V-2s recovered from Germany as well as the German scientists associated with that program. Krause managed to get access to this program in support of the ionospheric radio propagation research. Between 1946 and 1952 the NRL RSB was involved in 17 V-2 launches. Fourteen of these were successful and carried experiments involving cosmic radiation, solar radiation, pressure, and temperature. From 1946 through 1948 Bourdeau was involved in experiments measuring the attenuation of the X-band as it passed through the rocket exhaust and the measurement of the electrical field surrounding the midsection of the V-2 during flight.

==== Atmospheric Electricity Branch ====
After the V-2 rocket supply was used up, Bourdeau became involved in classified Department of Defense (DOD) programs in the Atmospheric Electricity Branch of NRL which was headed up by John F. Clark and T. Robert Burnight. He logged 5,000 flight hours doing research that included blind landing approaches in hurricanes, analysis of airborne atomic debris and atmospheric electricity, especially in thunderstorms. He left the NRL in 1958 upon the formation of the National Aeronautics and Space Administration (NASA).

=== NASA career ===
Bourdeau joined NASA at its formation in 1958 as Head of the Planetary Ionospheres Branch in the Space Sciences division at the Goddard Space Flight Center. He immediately submitted a proposal for satellite research based on his V-2 experiments ten years earlier. His proposal was accepted and he received the funding to design and build what would become Explorer 8. The only caveat was that he had to demonstrate feasibility. He did this by launching a sounding rocket with the proposed experiment from Fort Churchill in the Canadian Arctic in early 1960. The launch was a success and he was given the go-ahead to proceed with his project.

==== Head of Planetary Ionospheres Branch ====
Explorer 8

Bourdeau was named both Project Manager and Project Scientist for Explorer 8. Being Project Manager meant that he was responsible for managing the budget, the construction and the testing of the satellite, as well as the associated contractors and the press. Being Project Scientist meant that he was responsible for selecting other experiments and scientists to be included on Explorer 8. He found scientists and engineers to encode the signals from the experiments, design and build the radio-frequency transmitter, design the associated antenna and coat the satellite skin for thermal control. He worked with the Marshall Space Flight Center in Huntsville, Alabama to do the testing of the satellite.

Explorer 8 was a resounding success and cemented Bourdeau's reputation in his chosen field. Although it is technically correct that "battery power failure" occurred on December 27, 1960, Bourdeau and his team intentionally chose a short life over the risk of solar panel technology which was in its infancy. Bourdeau chose to retrieve a small amount of good quality data over a larger amount of data of unknown quality. The expected life of Explorer 8 was 60 days and it actually produced data at a rate of 500 bits of data per second during its life of 54 days. The data retrieved from the short life of this satellite was invaluable.

Explorer 8 was also instrumental in investigating the plasma sheath (interaction between the ionosphere and the satellite). These results led to interactions between Bourdeau and the manned flight program in Houston which had obvious interest in these results.

Ariel 1

Bourdeau was chosen as one of three U.S. Project Scientist for Ariel 1, a joint project between the U.S. and Great Britain. Ariel 1 was launched in 1962 and furthered his international reputation as a primary researcher in the field of ionospheric physics.

In 1962, he was awarded the NASA Exceptional Scientific Achievement Medal "for major scientific advance in the study of the ionosphere and for significant technological progress in the understanding of the plasma sheath about satellites, in his assignment as Project Manager and Scientist on Explorer VIII, NASA's first satellite to investigate the ionosphere, and as Project Scientist of Ariel."

Beacon Explorers

Bourdeau was the Project Scientist for the so-called "Beacon Explorers (BE)". These were smaller satellites intended to further the study of the ionosphere. BE-A was launched on March 19, 1964, but it never achieved orbit and was declared a mission failure. BE-B (also known as Explorer 22) was launched on October 10, 1964, from Vandenberg AFB. This satellite contributed significant data collection as well as world map production. It failed in February 1970 and was replaced by BE-C. BE-C (also known as Explorer 27) was launched on April 29, 1965, from Wallops Island, Virginia. This satellite produced data until July 20, 1973, when it was turned off due to inference with higher priority spacecraft.

Interplanetary Monitoring Platform

Bourdeau was responsible for a Thermal Ion and Electron Sensor experiment on the first three satellites in the Interplanetary Monitoring Platform program. These satellites were known as IMP A (Explorer 18), IMP B (Explorer 21) and IMP C (Explorer 28). These satellites were launched in 1963, 1964 and 1965. This experiment was essentially a continuation of the Explorer VIII ion trap experiments.

Sounding Rockets

Bourdeau is listed as the experimenter on a total of 27 sounding rockets between March 16, 1960, and August 24, 1965. Of these, four are listed as rocket failures and one as partially successful. The remaining 22 carried successful experiments in the ionosphere and plasma physics. Six were launched during the total solar eclipse on July 20, 1963. The sounding rockets were launched either from the Churchill Rocket Research Range in Fort Churchill, Canada or NASA's Wallops Flight Facility on Wallops Island, Virginia. Results from these experiments continued his record of publications in scientific journals and appearances in symposia.

==== Director of Projects ====
In 1965, Bourdeau was offered the position of Director of Projects (this directorate was renamed to Flight Projects in 1973). He hesitated over this decision because he feared losing touch with his beloved science but, in the end, he decided it was a challenge he should accept. As a result, he was put in charge of the following programs; Applications Technology Satellites, Orbiting Astronomical Observatory (OAO), Orbiting Geophysical Observatory (OGO), TIROS, Nimbus, and Delta (rocket family)

It is notable that during this time, in spite of managing all these people and programs, Bourdeau continued his scientific endeavors by participation in a Positive ION Study on OGO 2 and OGO 4.

==== Director of Space Applications and Technology ====
On April 10, 1972, Bourdeau was appointed Director of Space Applications and Technology. He held this position until his retirement. While in this role he was responsible for the Interplanetary Monitoring Platform I (Also known as Explorer 47) as well as the Small Astronomy Satellite 2.

=== Post-NASA career ===
Bourdeau retired from NASA in 1973 after being offered an attractive "early out" financial package. He went back into various corporate research labs in the D.C. area doing his beloved research. This portion of his career was cut short after he was hit by a drunk driver while in a crosswalk in Silver Spring, Maryland. Multiple bones in his legs were broken. He continued to work for a while from his hospital bed at home but eventually retired permanently. He did continue to go to GSFC to attend presentations and events. In 2004 he wrote recollections of his career that he shared with family.

== Personal life ==
Bourdeau was married twice. His first marriage, to Claire Estelle Baldwin, was on August 15, 1944. He met Claire (a Navy WAVE) while rescuing her from being hit by a bus. They had two children: Michele Ann Bourdeau (Timothy McQueen) born June 12, 1945, and Robert Roland (Audrey) born January 1, 1948. Bob and Claire were divorced in July 1974. He married Lucille (Lioy) Loche on November 2, 1974.

=== Death ===
Bourdeau died on March 5, 2010, in Laurel, Maryland, from complications of a stroke. His final resting place is St. Anne's cemetery in Turners Falls, Massachusetts.

== Awards ==
- NASA Exceptional Scientific Achievement Medal 1962
- NASA Distinguished Service Medal 1969
