= Turners Falls Road Bridge =

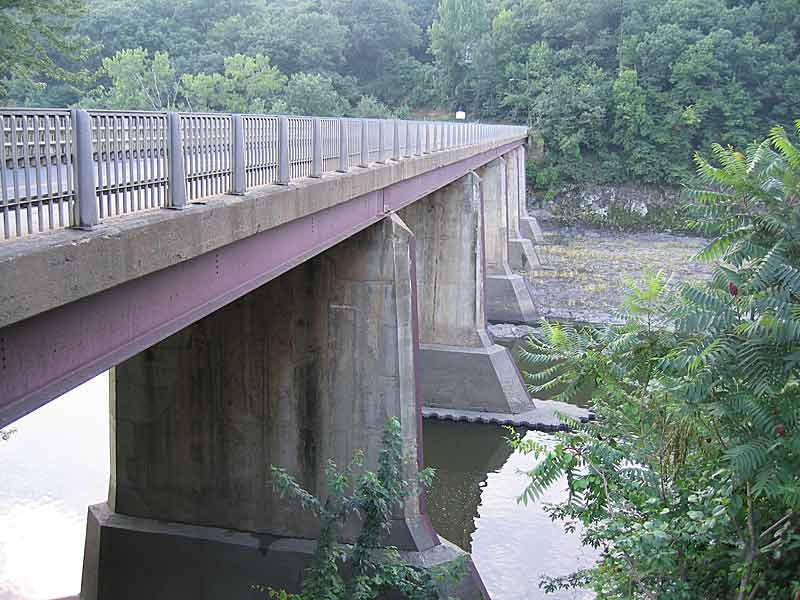
- Upstream side of the bridge with the river fully diverted away
- Coordinates: 42°36′33″N 72°33′41″W
- Carries: vehicular and pedestrian traffic
- Crosses: Connecticut River
- Locale: Greenfield and Montague, Franklin County, Massachusetts
- Official name: White Bridge
- Maintained by: MassHighway
- ID number: G1200212RMHDNBI

Characteristics
- Design: Stringer/Multi-beam or Girder
- Material: Steel (and concrete)
- Total length: 135.9 metres (445.9 ft)
- Width: 6.1 metres (20.0 ft)
- No. of spans: 6
- Piers in water: 5
- Load limit: 51.5 metric tons

History
- Opened: 1936

Statistics
- Daily traffic: 10,800 (2003)

The Turners Falls Road Bridge (officially White Bridge) is a concrete and steel road bridge over the Connecticut River in the U.S. state of Massachusetts. It carries Turners Falls Road and connects the town center of Greenfield and the village of Turners Falls (in the town of Montague).

== History ==
The current bridge is the second on this site. Previously, a suspension bridge constructed in 1871 and known as the "Lower Suspension Bridge" was located at the site. The old bridge was constructed with funds from the towns of Greenfield and Montague and cost about $36,000. A road connecting the bridge to Greenfield center was laid out by the following year. The bridge was constructed primarily to allow laborers in Greenfield to easily go to the newly developing village of Turners Falls. The previous bridge was severely damaged in the 1936 flood and the current bridge was constructed soon after.

In the 1920s, Route 2 (former New England Route 7) originally left Greenfield via Turners Falls Road, crossing the old suspension bridge into the village of Turners Falls. Route 2 left Turners Falls via Millers Falls Road. In 1932, a more modern bridge capable of handling the increased automobile traffic, the French King Bridge, opened further upstream and Route 2 was relocated to its modern alignment along French King Highway. The former alignment through Turners Falls was designated as Route 2A. The Route 2A designation remained on Turners Falls Road until the 1960s.

The Massachusetts Highway Department started a rehabilitation project in 2010, which is, as of May 2015, almost done.

== See also ==
- List of crossings of the Connecticut River
