= Walter Kostanski =

American businessman and politician

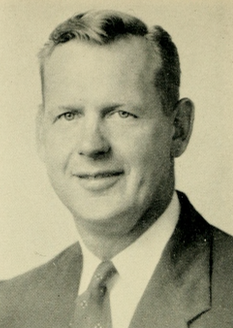
- Born: December 10, 1923; Erving, Massachusetts
- Died: June 15, 2015 (aged 91)
- Occupations: Businessperson & Politician
- Years active: 1957 to 1995
- Organizations: Massachusetts House of Representatives; Franklin County Register of Deeds
- Political party: Republican

Walter Theodore Kostanski Jr. (December 10, 1923–June 15, 2015) was an American businessman and politician.

== History ==
=== Early life ===
Walter Kostanski was born in Erving, Massachusetts. He lived in Turners Falls, Massachusetts and went to the Turners Falls High School.

In 1942, Kostanski tried out for the Chicago Cubs, and then the Brooklyn Dodgers in 1946.

=== Military ===
Kostanski served in the United States Naval Armed Guard during World War II. While in the guard he served as a Gunners Mate Third Class on the ESSO Rochester from 1943-1946. In 1947, Kostanski married Virginia Geraghty.

Walter Kostanski
- Allegiance: United States
- Branch: United States Naval Armed Guard
- Service years: 1943-1946
- Awards: WWII Victory Medal, American Area Campaign Ribbon; European – African Area; Campaign Ribbon; Asiatic – Pacific Area Ribbon; The Philippine Liberation Medal

=== Business ===
After his service in the military he went to the Franklin & Marshall College and to the New England Institute of Funeral Directing Embalming. Kostanski lived in Turners Falls with his wife and family. He was a funeral director and was the owner of the Kostanski Funeral Home in Turners Falls.

=== Politics ===
Kostanski served in the Massachusetts House of Representatives from 1957 to 1971 and was a Republican. He served as the Franklin County Register of Deeds from 1971 to 1995. Kostanski retired in 1995.

=== Death ===
Kostanski died at his home in Turners Falls on June 15, 2015.

== Awards and medals ==
War medals include:

- WWII Victory Medal
- American Area Campaign Ribbon
- European – African Area Campaign Ribbon
- Asiatic – Pacific Area Ribbon
- The Philippine Liberation Medal
