= Rip-up clasts =

Pieces of clay or mud removed by currents

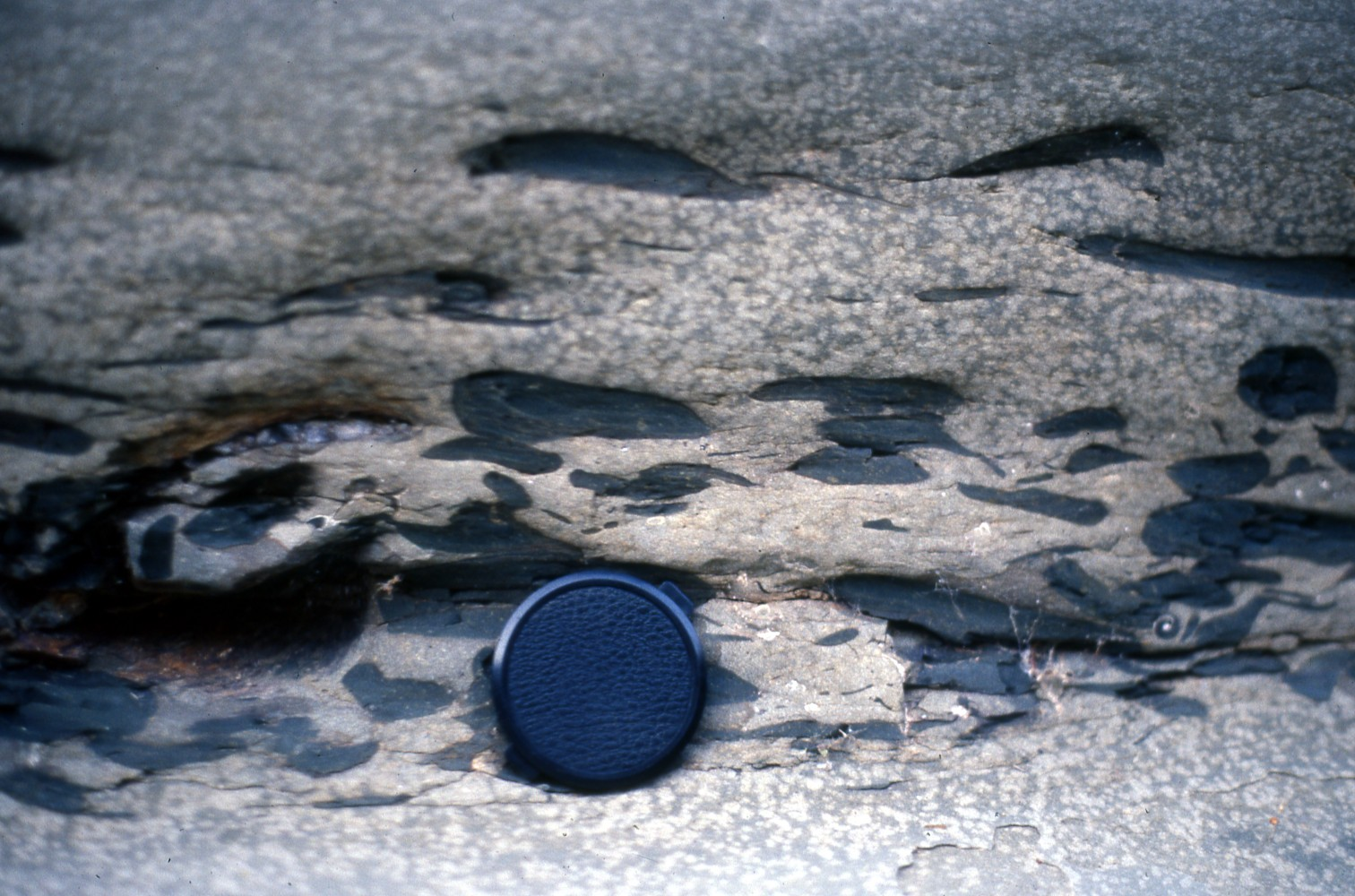
Shale rip-up clasts in a nearshore marine sandstone, Matilija Fm. Topatopa Mountains, California.

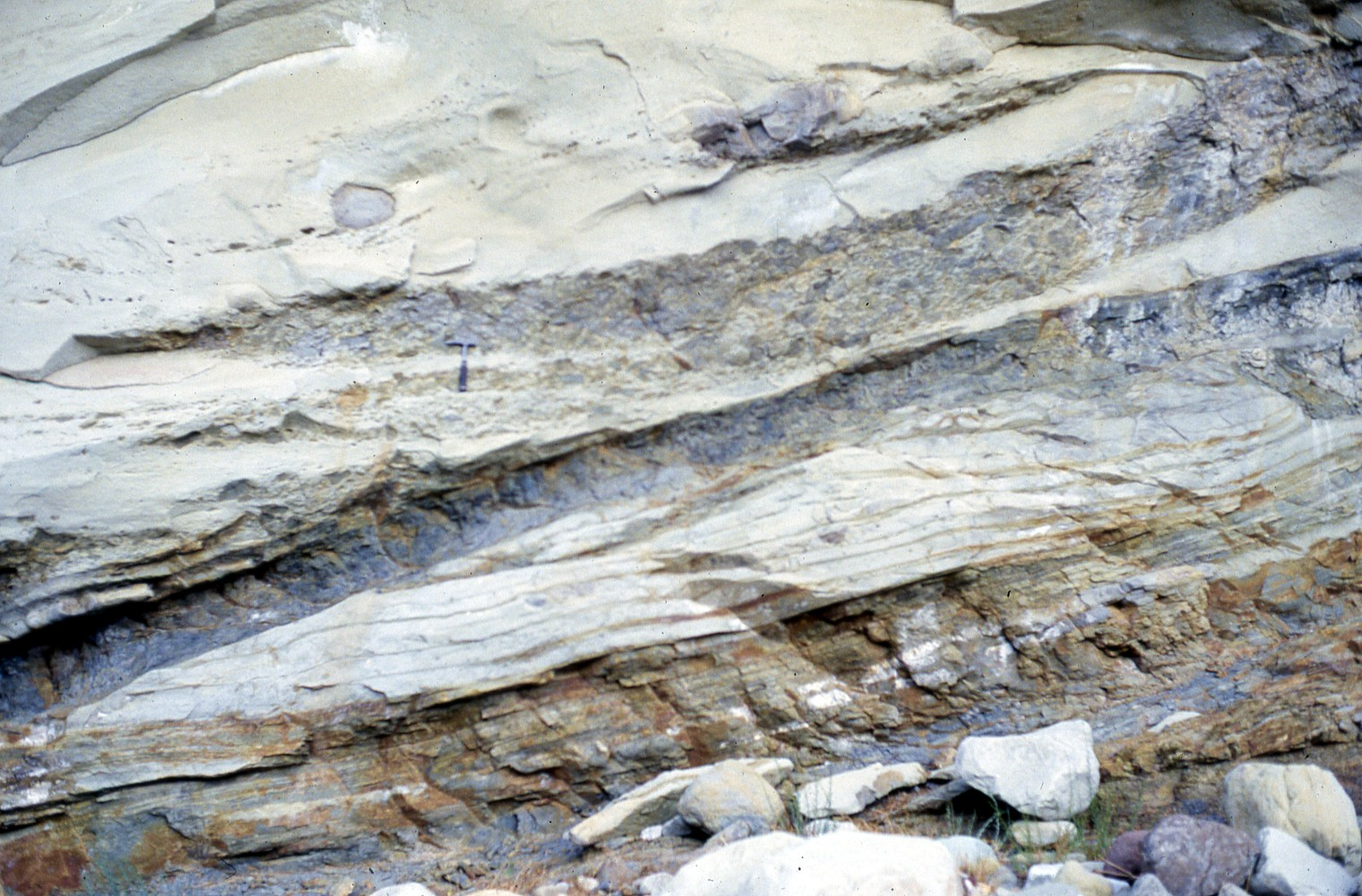
A giant shale rip-up clast at the base of a high-density turbidite, Cozy Dell Fm. Topatopa Mountains, California.

Rip-up clasts are gravel-size pieces of clay or mud created when an erosive current flows over a bed of clay or mud and removes pieces of clayey sediment, and transports them some distance. Because clayey sediments can be quite cohesive, even when freshly deposited, large clasts of clayey sediment can be ripped up, transported and subsequently preserved when the eroding current finally deposits its sediment. After deposition and deep burial by the accumulation of additional sediments, diagenesis transforms the gravel-size pieces of clayey sediment into shale or mudstone rip-up clasts. Shale rip-up clasts are often found at the base of sandy turbidites, in lag deposits at the base of channelized sandstones, and associated with subaqueous dunes and bars.

== See also ==
Armored mud ball
