= Turners Falls–Gill Bridge =

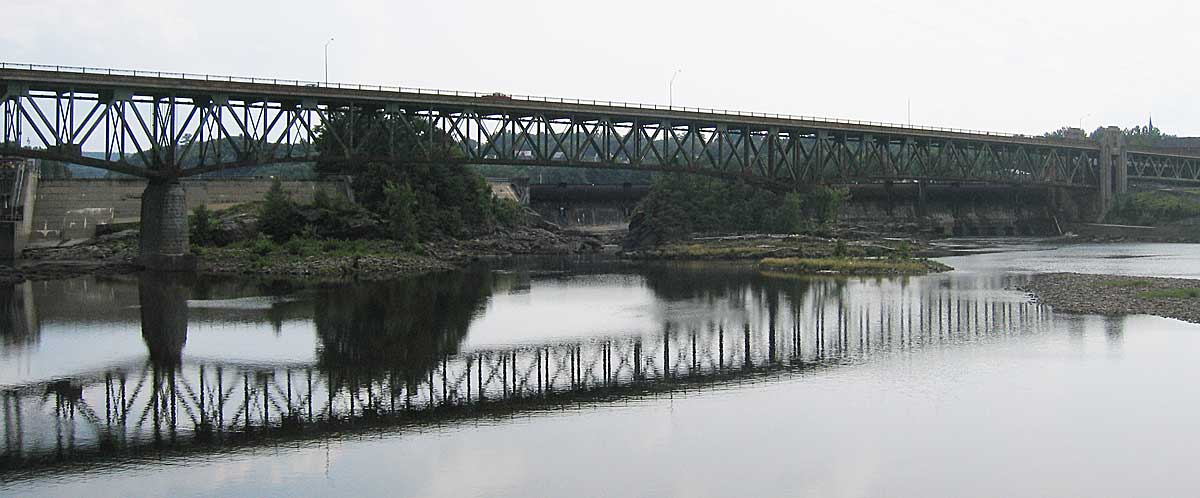
- Coordinates: 42.6115°N 72.552°W
- Carries: pedestrian and vehicular traffic
- Crosses: Connecticut River
- Locale: Gill and Turners Falls

Characteristics
- Design: truss bridge
- Total length: 528.2 metres (1,733 ft)

History
- Construction end: 1938

Location
- Interactive map of Turners Falls–Gill Bridge

The Turners Falls–Gill Bridge (sometimes called the Gill–Montague Bridge), is a steel deck truss bridge crossing the Connecticut River in Massachusetts. It connects the Town of Gill with the village of Turners Falls in the Town of Montague. The bridge carries automobile and pedestrian traffic.

Eagle over Bible architectural detail on the Gill end of the bridge, a nod to Dwight L. Moody

== History ==
Before the bridge was constructed, a ferry known as "Bissel's Ferry" operated approximately a quarter-mile upriver from this site. In 1878, the ferry was replaced by an earlier bridge, known as the Upper or 'Red' Suspension Bridge—distinguishing it from the "Lower Suspension Bridge," at the current downriver site of the Turners Falls Road Bridge—which was 563 feet long. Damaged beyond repair in the devastating Connecticut Valley flood of 1936, it was replaced by the current bridge in 1938 and torn down in 1942 to recover materials for the war effort; its piers remain on the river banks.

The current structure began construction on May 17, 1937 and was completed in September 1938. The bridge was dedicated on Saturday, September 10, 1938. By 2010, the road deck of the bridge had become riddled with potholes and uneven pavement. A major renovation project began in summer 2010 and finished in 2014 at an estimated cost of $40.7 million.
