= Turners Falls Formation =

Geological Formation in Massachusetts

- Type: Geological formation
- Unit of: Newark Supergroup

Location
- Region: Massachusetts
- Country: United States

The Turners Falls Formation or Turners Falls Sandstone is an Early Jurassic geological formation in Massachusetts. Various reptile tracks and footprints are known from this strata. These include Antipus flexiloquus, which has been interpreted as belonging to a small quadrupedal reptile or a pterosaur, though it is most likely a crocodylomorph.

The formation is thought to represent the distal zones of three alluvial fans flowing west into a semiarid rift valley formed by a Mesozoic graben. These deposits represent the first infilling of the lowland that would one day become the Connecticut River Valley.

In addition to trace fossils, the Turners Falls Formation bears some of the most well-preserved specimens of armored mud balls in the world.

== See also ==
- List of pterosaur-bearing stratigraphic units
- Portland Formation
- Armored mud ball
