= Dedic Site =

Archaeological site in Massachusetts, US

- DEDIC Site
- U.S. National Register of Historic Places
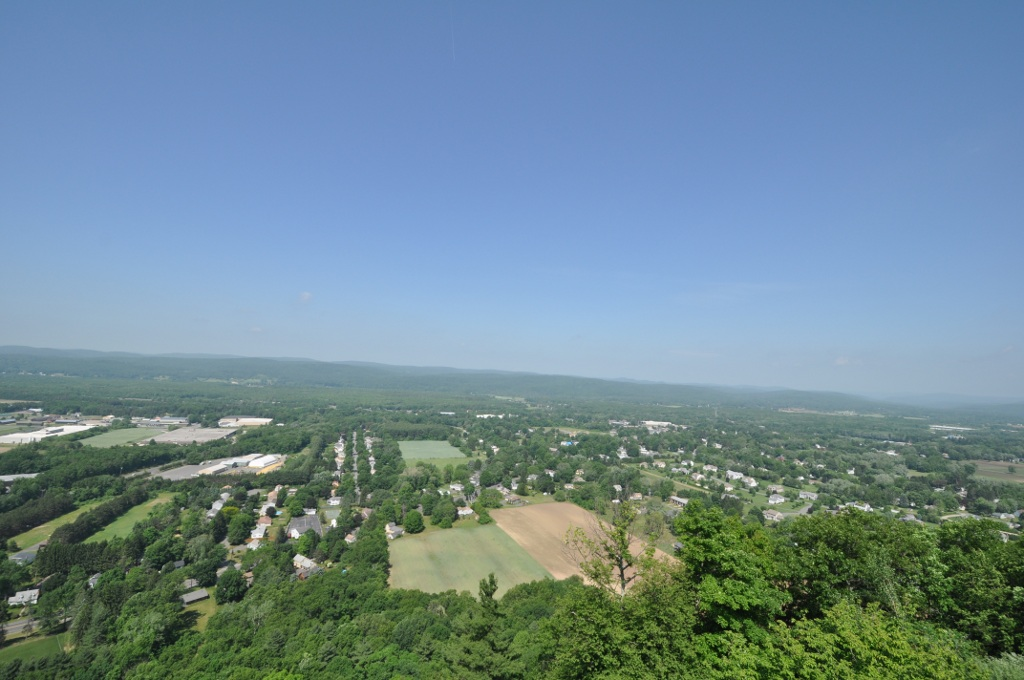
- View of South Deerfield from Mount Sugarloaf

- Location within Massachusetts Location within the United States
- Nearest city: South Deerfield, Massachusetts
- NRHP reference No.: 80000504
- Added to NRHP: July 16, 1980

The DEDIC or DEDIC/Sugarloaf Site is a paleo-Indian Clovis-era archaeological site in South Deerfield, Massachusetts. It encompasses an area of the Connecticut and Deerfield River valleys containing evidence of relatively large-scale human habitation dating back some 10,000 years. It is located in the general vicinity of Mount Sugarloaf. Part of it is set on the lip of a ravine, apparently a site that the natives used as a kill site, since it served as a choke point in the movements of large animals. It was added to the National Register of Historic Places in 1980.

The site was first identified by a survey conducted in 1978 for the Deerfield Economic Development & Industrial Corporation, a local government economic development organization. Its significance was recognized, and the site was protected by a protective covenant. Adjacent land, in private ownership, was investigated in 1995 by Dr. Richard Gramly, and was acquired by the state when it was threatened by development. The site was again excavated by Dr. Gramly in 2013. This work greatly expanded the number of finds, and is of the opinion that the site is one of largest late-Clovis sites in New England. It has yielded stone artifacts such as scrapers, drills, hammerstones, and a stone bead, with the source stone material coming from a variety of locations across New England. One of the finds is (as of 2015) the largest known fluted lance head to be found in the northeastern United States.

A display of artifacts found at the site has been established in Deerfield's Conway Street municipal building.

== See also ==
- National Register of Historic Places listings in Franklin County, Massachusetts
- Riverside Archeological District, in nearby Gill
