= Gill, Massachusetts =

- Town
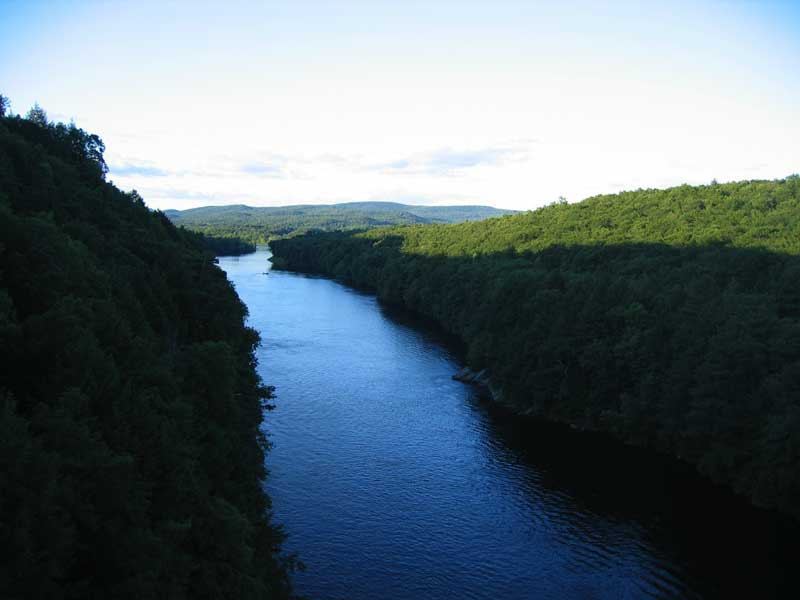
- The Connecticut River looking north in the early evening, from the French King Bridge at the Erving–Gill town line

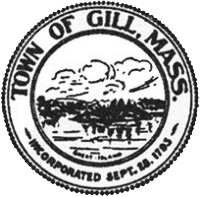
- Seal

- Location in Franklin County in Massachusetts
- Coordinates: 42°38′25″N 72°30′00″W
- Country: United States
- State: Massachusetts
- County: Franklin
- Settled: 1776
- Incorporated: 1793

Government
  - Type: Open town meeting

Area
  - Total: 14.8 sq mi (38.3 km^{2})
  - Land: 13.7 sq mi (35.6 km^{2})
  - Water: 1.0 sq mi (2.7 km^{2})
- Elevation: 377 ft (115 m)

Population (2020)
  - Total: 1,551
  - Density: 113/sq mi (43.6/km^{2})
- Time zone: UTC−5 (Eastern)
  - Summer (DST): UTC−4 (Eastern)
- ZIP Code: 01354
- Area code: 413
- FIPS code: 25-25730
- GNIS feature ID: 0618164
- Website: www.gillmass.org

Gill is a town in Franklin County, Massachusetts, United States. The population was 1,551 at the 2020 census. It is part of the Springfield, Massachusetts Metropolitan Statistical Area.

== History ==
Prior to the arrival of English colonists, the Massachusetts portion of the Connecticut River valley was occupied by the Nipmuc, an Algonquin-speaking tribe. A site on the river near the great falls shows evidence of human habitation dating back 10,000 years or more. In the 1670s the Nipmuc had a village called Peskeompscut in that area. During King Philip's War in 1676, Captain William Turner led 150 colonists in an attack on this settlement, in which 100-200 Indians (mostly women, children, and elderly) were slain. The falls came to be known as Turners Falls after Turner, who was slain in the battle. (The falls thereafter gave that name to the village of Turners Falls in neighboring Montague.)

Gill was first settled in 1776 and was officially incorporated in 1793. The town is named in honor of Moses Gill, a member of Massachusetts' Executive Council who became lieutenant governor in 1794 and acting governor in 1799 when Governor Increase Sumner died.

The first town meeting was held December 18, 1793, with Moses Bascom as moderator. Elected officers were Moses Bascom Jr. as town clerk and treasurer, Moses Bascom, William Smalley and Noah Munn as selectmen and assessors, and David Squires as constable.

== Geography ==
According to the United States Census Bureau, the town has a total area of 14.8 square miles (38.3 km^{2}), of which 13.7 square miles (35.6 km^{2}) is land and 1.0 square mile (2.7 km^{2}), or 6.96%, is water.

Gill is located on the west bank of the Connecticut River, which flows along the town's eastern and southern edges. The river forms most of the town's boundary with Northfield, to the east, and separates the town from Erving to the southeast, and Montague to the south. The Fall River, a small tributary, forms the boundary with Greenfield to the southwest. Continuing clockwise, the town shares land boundaries with Bernardston in the northwest, and a portion of Northfield to the north.

== Demographics ==
Historical population
Year	Pop.	±%
1850	754	—
1860	683	−9.4%
1870	653	−4.4%
1880	733	+12.3%
1890	960	+31.0%
1900	1,015	+5.7%
1910	942	−7.2%
1920	879	−6.7%
1930	983	+11.8%
1940	931	−5.3%
1950	1,070	+14.9%
1960	1,203	+12.4%
1970	1,100	−8.6%
1980	1,259	+14.5%
1990	1,583	+25.7%
2000	1,363	−13.9%
2010	1,500	+10.1%
2020	1,551	+3.4%
2022	1,560	+0.6%
* = population estimate. Source: United States census records and Population Estimates Program data.

As of the census of 2000, there were 1,363 people, 537 households, and 373 families residing in the town. The population density was 97.5 inhabitants per square mile (37.6/km^{2}). There were 560 housing units at an average density of 40.1 per square mile (15.5/km^{2}). The racial makeup of the town was 97.43% White, 0.29% African American, 0.07% Native American, 0.81% Asian, 0.37% from other races, and 1.03% from two or more races. Hispanic or Latino of any race were 0.73% of the population.

There were 537 households, out of which 32.6% had children under the age of 18 living with them, 58.1% were married couples living together, 8.0% had a female householder with no husband present, and 30.5% were non-families. 23.1% of all households were made up of individuals, and 10.8% had someone living alone who was 65 years of age or older. The average household size was 2.53 and the average family size was 3.03.

In the town, the population was spread out, with 23.7% under the age of 18, 6.6% from 18 to 24, 26.8% from 25 to 44, 30.2% from 45 to 64, and 12.8% who were 65 years of age or older. The median age was 42 years. For every 100 females, there were 95.3 males. For every 100 females age 18 and over, there were 91.5 males.

The median income for a household in the town was $50,750, and the median income for a family was $61,339. Males had a median income of $35,402 versus $26,613 for females. The per capita income for the town was $23,381. About 3.9% of families and 4.4% of the population were below the poverty line, including 2.5% of those under age 18 and 11.8% of those age 65 or over.

== Education ==
Gill is home to one elementary school, the Gill Elementary School. Middle and high school students attend Great Falls Middle School and Turner Falls High School in Montague respectively.

The campus of Northfield Mount Hermon School is located in the Mount Hermon section of the town.

== Points of interest ==
- French King Bridge
- Gill–Montague Bridge
- Northfield Mount Hermon School
- Renaissance Community, a commune (1968–1988)
- Turners Falls Dam

== Notable people ==
- Bryan Callen, American stand-up comedian, actor, writer and podcaster
- E. Stevens Henry, U.S. Representative
- Sereno Merrill, Wisconsin State Assemblyman
- Matt Striebel, Professional lacrosse midfielder

== Gallery ==
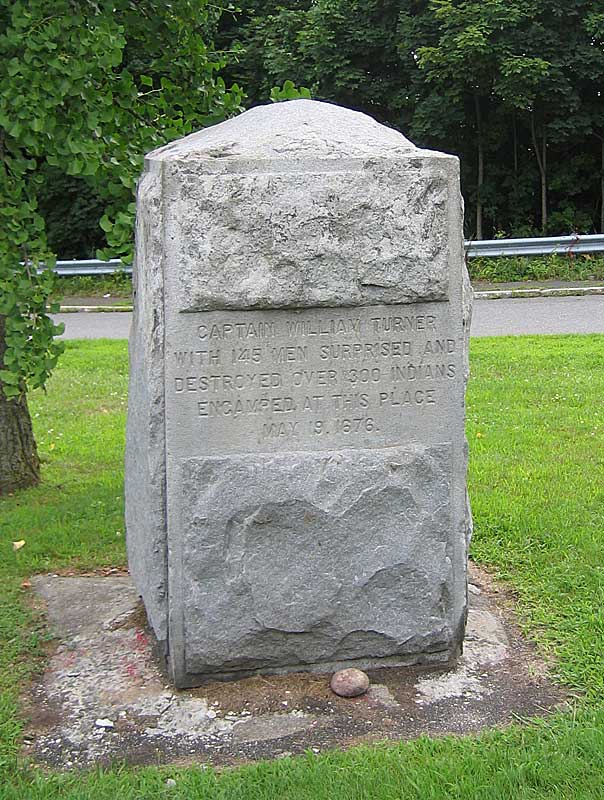
Monument on the Gill side of the Turners Falls–Gill Bridge, with the text "Captain William Turner with 145 men surprised and destroyed over 300 Indians encamped at this place May 19, 1676"

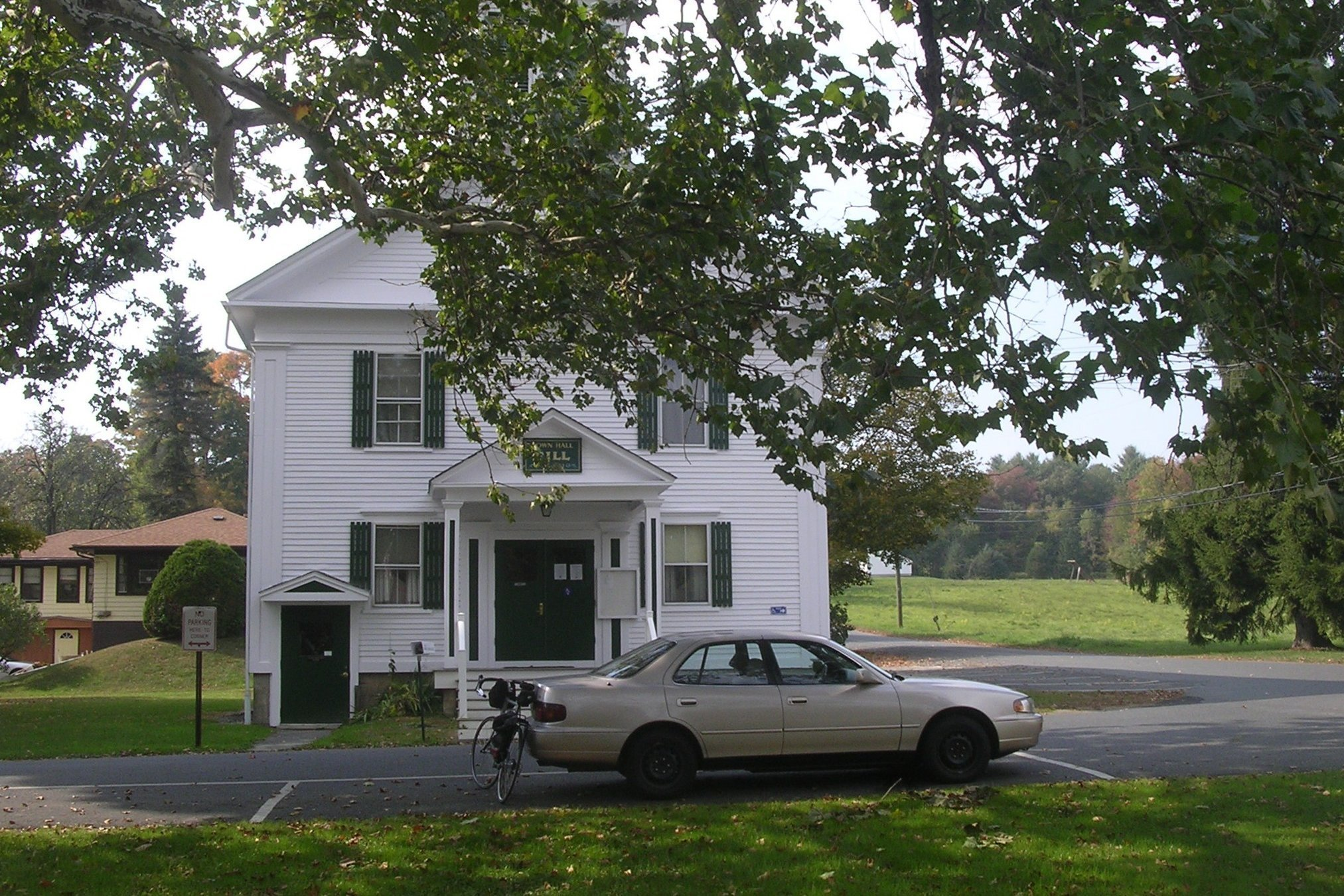
Gill Town Hall
