= French King Bridge =

Bridge in Gill and Erving, Massachusetts

French King Bridge aka: FKB
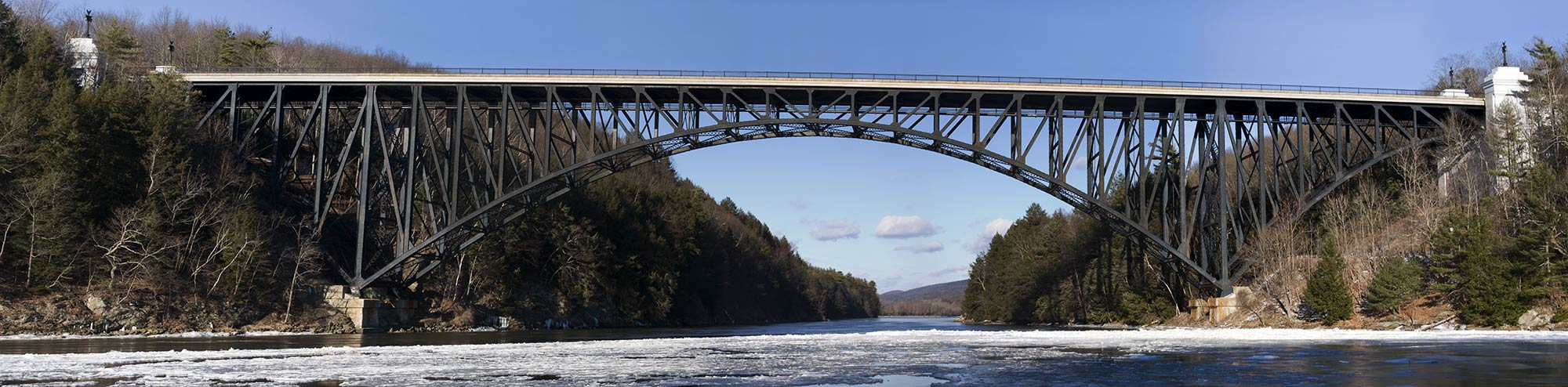
- Coordinates: 42°35′52″N 72°29′48″W
- Carries: Route 2 pedestrian and vehicular traffic
- Crosses: Connecticut River
- Locale: Gill, Massachusetts, and Erving, Massachusetts
- Maintained by
- ID number: E-10-014 or G-04-009

Characteristics
- Design: Spandrel-braced steel deck arch bridge
- Total length: 782 feet (238 m)
- Width: 47.8 feet (14.6 m)
- Height: 140 feet (43 m)
- Longest span: 460 feet (140 m)

History
- Construction start: September 1931
- Construction end: 1932
- Opened: September 10, 1932; 94 years ago

Location
- Interactive map of French King Bridge aka: FKB

The French King Bridge is the three-span "cantilever arch" bridge that crosses the Connecticut River on the border between the towns of Erving and Gill, Massachusetts, United States. The bridge, part of Massachusetts Route 2, carries automobile, bicycle, and pedestrian traffic and is owned and managed by the Massachusetts Department of Transportation (MassDOT).

== History ==
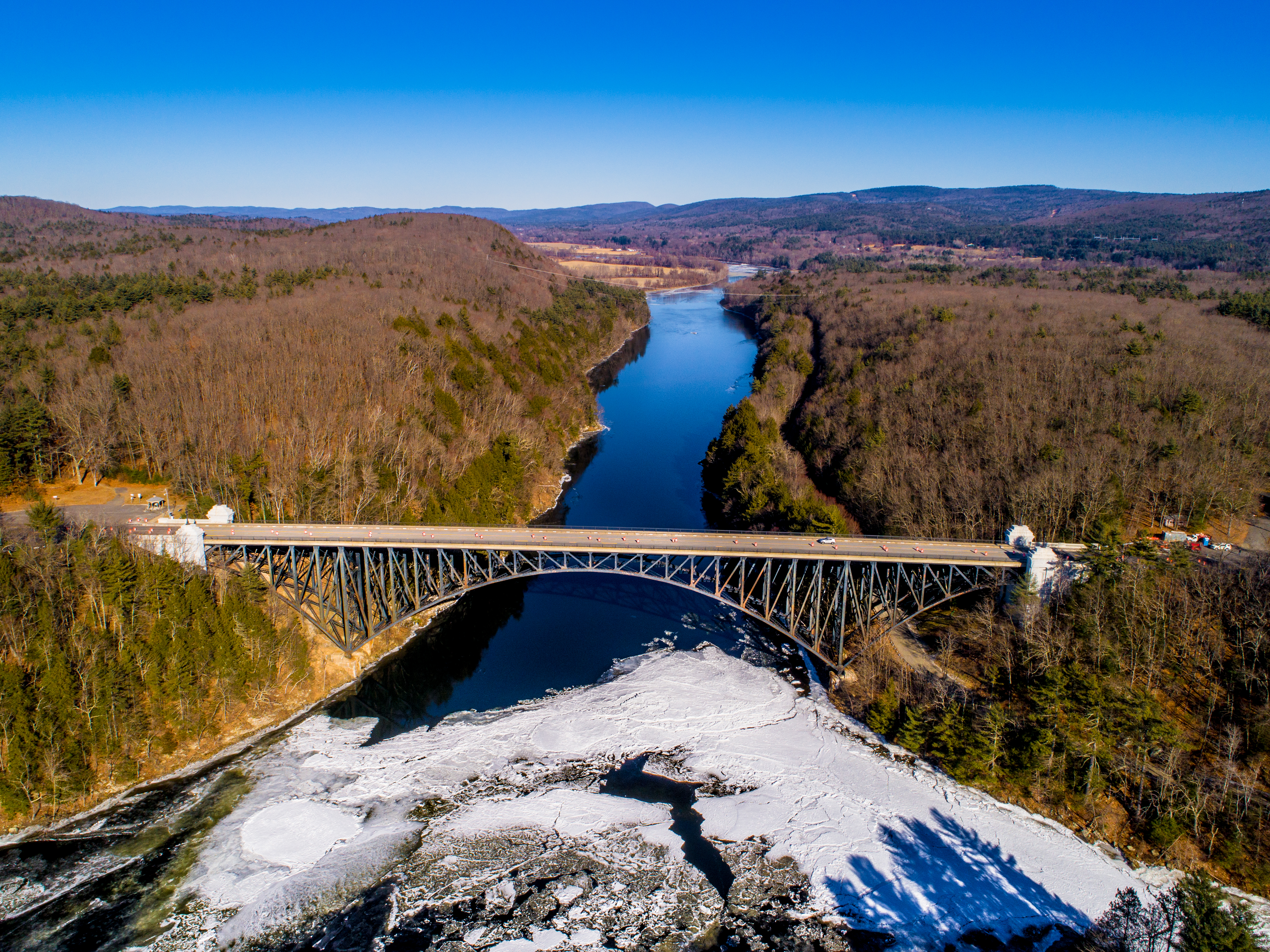
French King Bridge

The French King Bridge (FKB) was opened to traffic on September 10, 1932. It was named the "Most Beautiful Steel Bridge" of 1932 by the American Institute of Steel Construction. The bridge was rebuilt in 1992, and refurbished in 2008–2010.

== Suicides ==
In 2009, police had said that between 26 and 31 people were known to have jumped off the bridge since its construction in 1932, with only 2 survivors.

In 2023, a nine-foot high steel barrier was erected on both sides of the bridge by the MassDOT. The barriers have all but stopped the need for emergency responders to be called to the bridge for the rescue of people in crisis, or for the recovery of people who have jumped.

== Name ==
The name comes from a nearby geographical feature named French King Rock, visible in the middle of the river.

== Image gallery ==
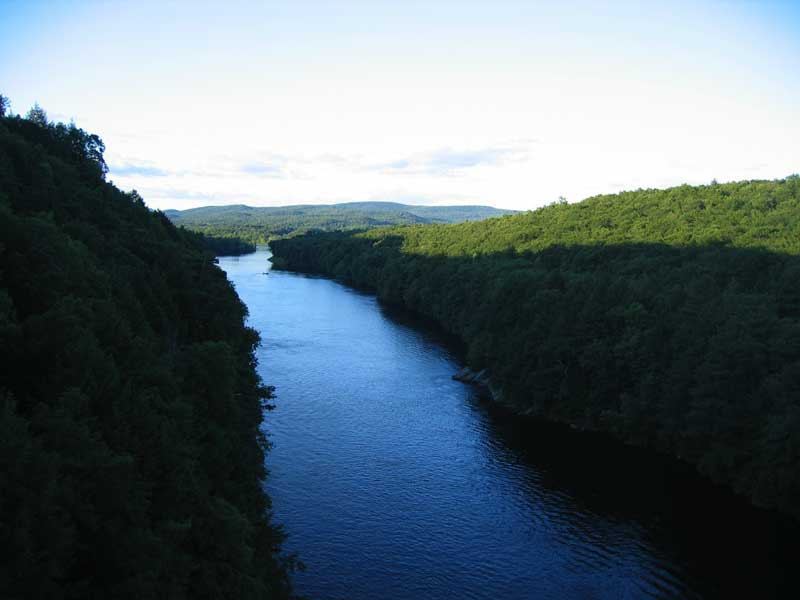
A view north from the top of the bridge during summer (August 2007)

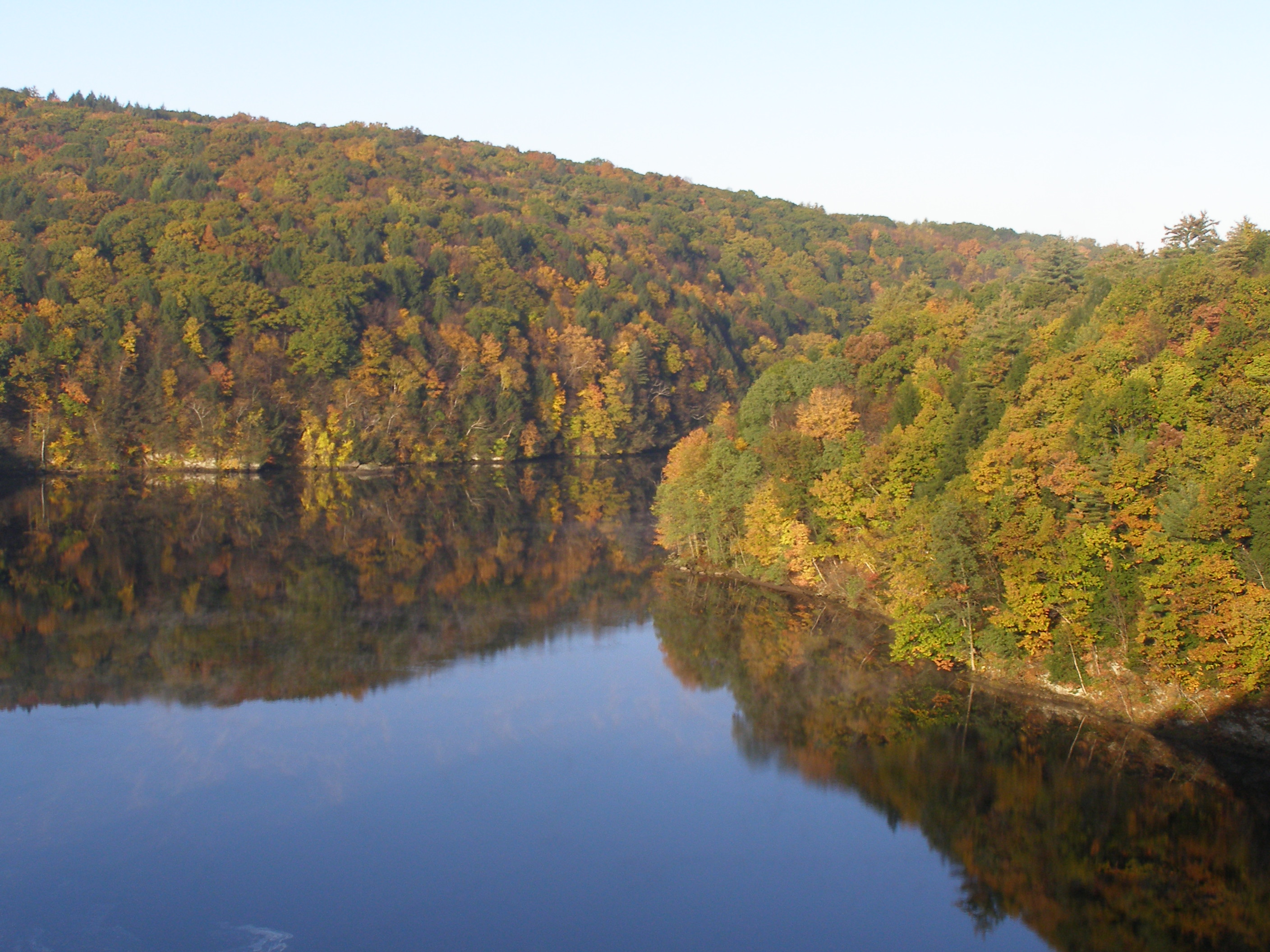
A view from the bridge to Connecticut River at Autumn

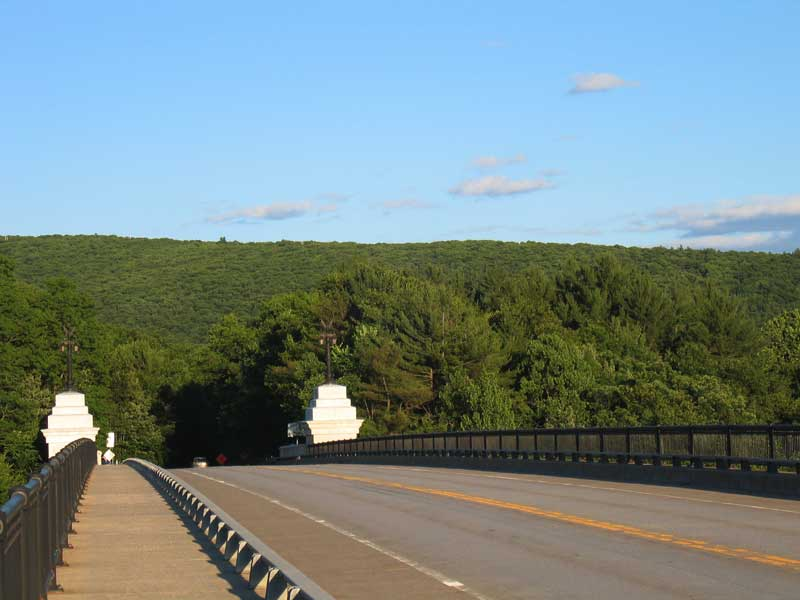
A view of the road surface and guard rails

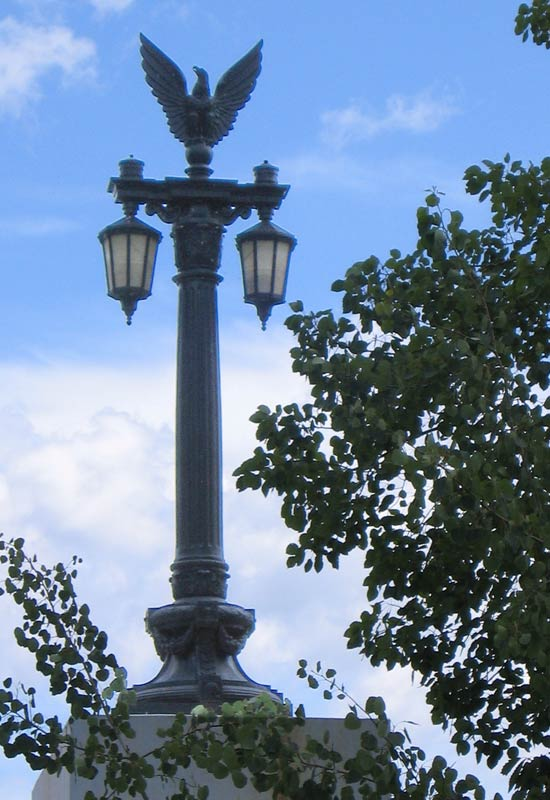
The southwest lamp post

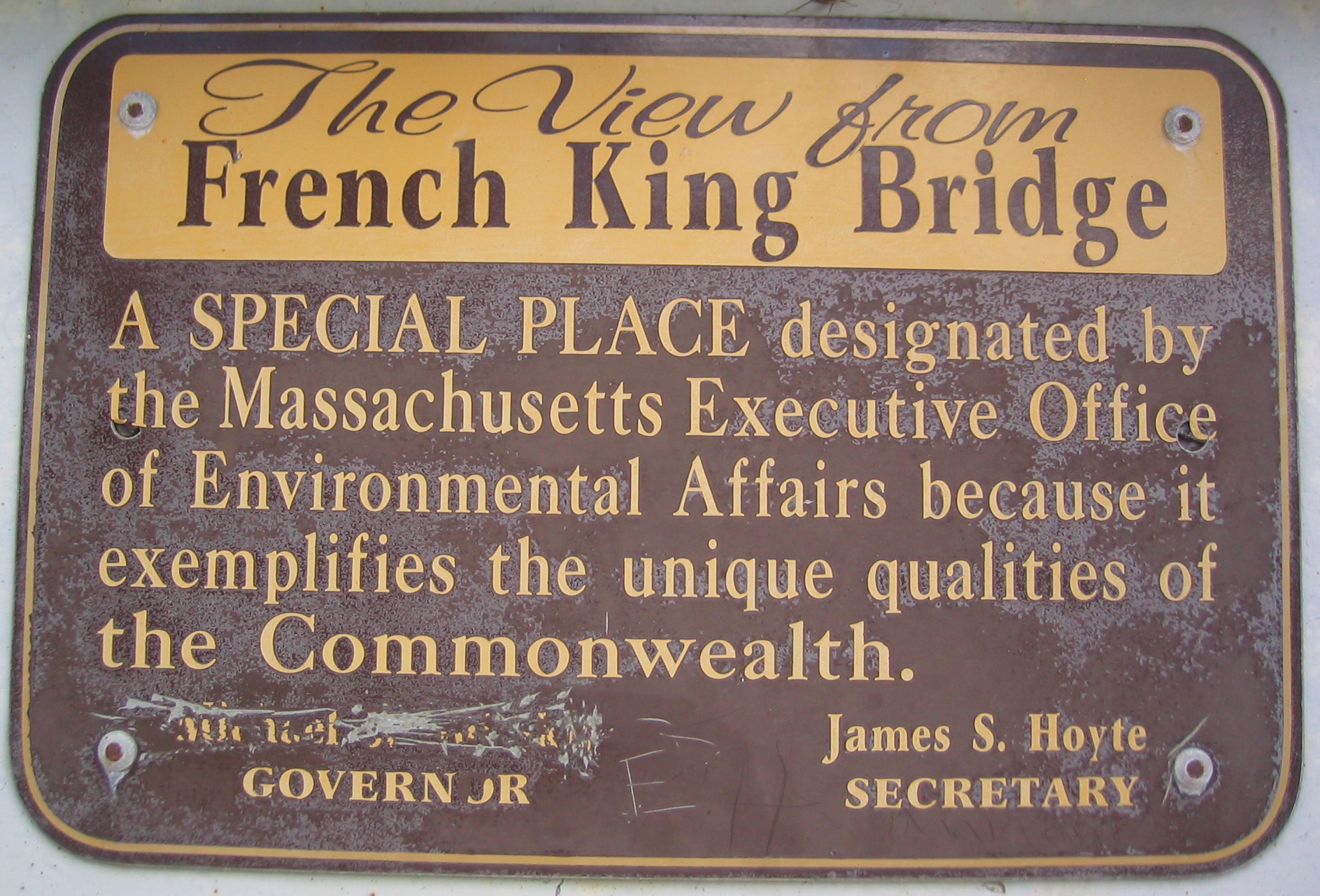
The honorary plaque on the North West side of the bridge

== See also ==
- List of bridges documented by the Historic American Engineering Record in Massachusetts
- List of crossings of the Connecticut River
