= Renaissance Community =

Massachusetts commune, founded 1968

Coordinates: 42.6432°N 72.4906°W

Brotherhood of the Spirit: Warwick, Mass. 1970.

The Brotherhood of the Spirit (renamed Renaissance Community in 1974) was one of the largest and most enduring communes in the northeast United States and as such was a distinct link between the commune phenomenon of the 1960s and the New Age movement. In existence from 1968 through 1988, its rise and fall mirrored that of its charismatic and mercurial leader, Michael Metelica. The Brotherhood of the Spirit underwent several distinct identity changes during its 20-year history. The Brotherhood of the Spirit was reported in the Wall Street Journal, Look, Family Circle, and Mademoiselle magazines. They had also been featured on 60 Minutes and the David Frost show.

In 1974, the Brotherhood became the legally-recognized Renaissance Church Community and moved its operations to the mill town of Turners Falls, MA.

Resentment and Metelica's increasing abusive behavior due to drug and alcohol addictions led to eventual migrations of members out of the community until 1988 when the few remaining members paid Metelica to leave and never return.

== The Aftermath: 1988–2006 ==
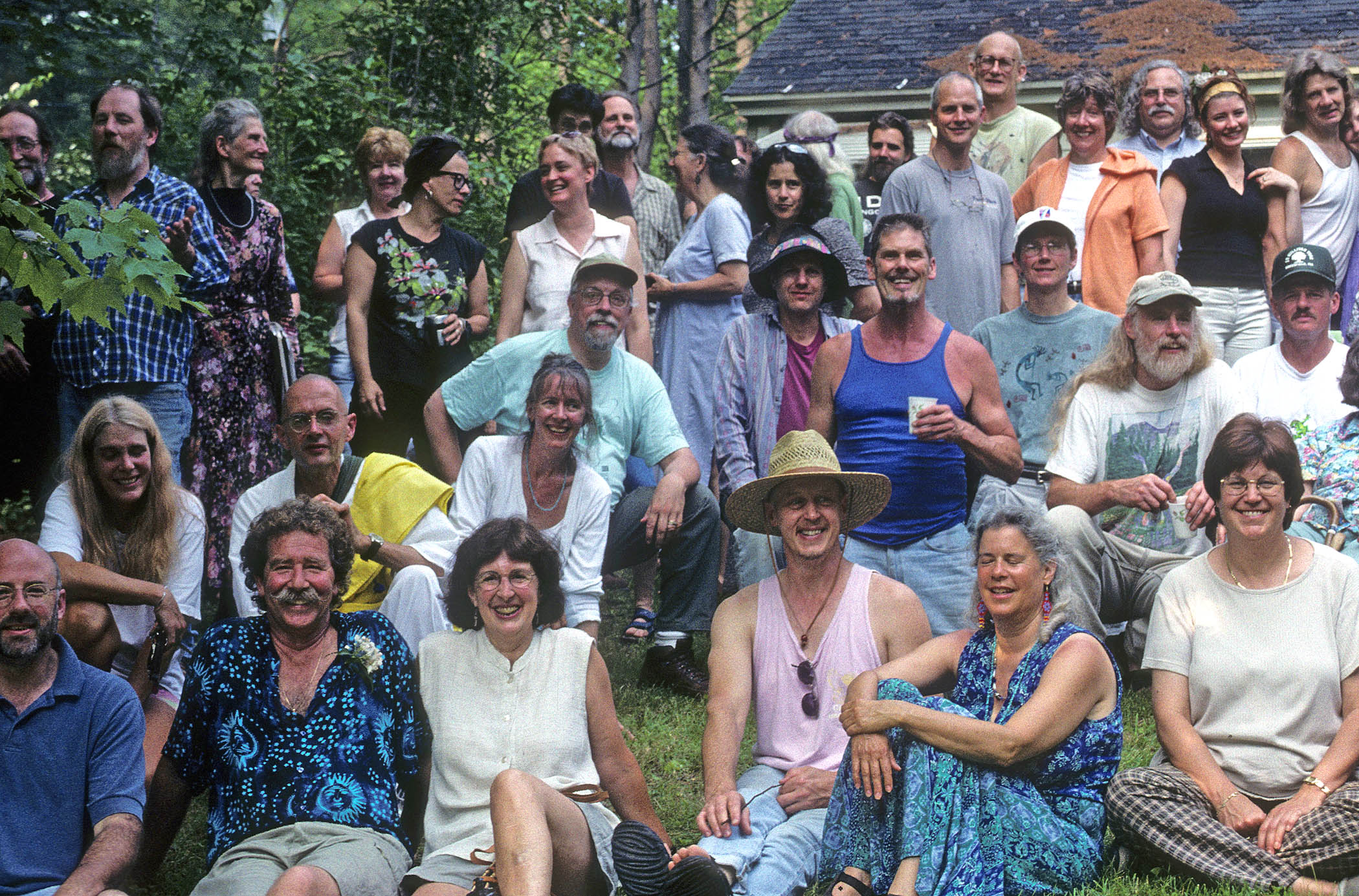
Reunion, 2002.

In 1988, the Renaissance Community as a recognizable communal entity came to an end. The commune's property was cleaned up and cooperatively managed. The various houses were sold off to private ownership or converted and renovated into separate apartments. Several contracting businesses based in Gill still exist, along with regular seminars dealing with meditation and spiritual practice. Former and current members attend reunions and discuss the community's controversial legacy. In May 2006, former member Bruce Geisler produced a documentary film about the community entitled Free Spirits: The Birth, Life and Loss of a New Age Dream.
