= Turners Falls, Massachusetts =

- Census-designated place
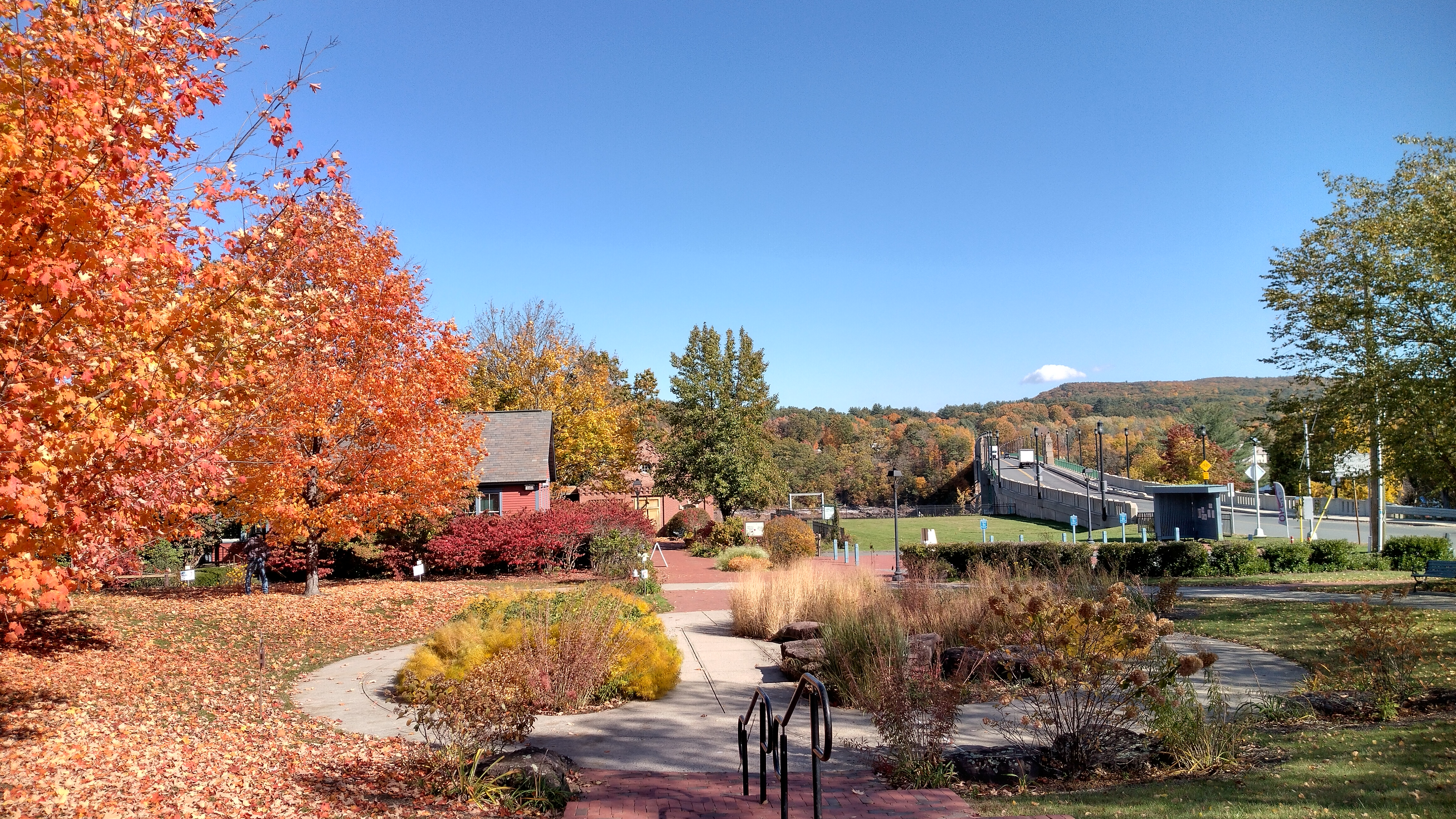
- Turners Falls at Great Falls Discovery Center

- Location in Franklin County in Massachusetts
- Coordinates: 42°35′56″N 72°33′25″W
- Country: United States
- State: Massachusetts
- County: Franklin
- Town: Montague

Area
  - Total: 2.30 sq mi (5.96 km^{2})
  - Land: 1.90 sq mi (4.92 km^{2})
  - Water: 0.40 sq mi (1.04 km^{2})
- Elevation: 240 ft (73 m)

Population (2020)
  - Total: 4,512
  - Density: 2,373/sq mi (916.4/km^{2})
- Time zone: UTC-5 (Eastern (EST))
  - Summer (DST): UTC-4 (EDT)
- ZIP Code: 01376
- Area code: 413
- FIPS code: 25-70815
- GNIS feature ID: 0608956
- Turners Falls Historic District
- U.S. National Register of Historic Places
- U.S. Historic district
- Location within Massachusetts Location within the United States
- Location: Turners Falls, Massachusetts
- Coordinates: 42°36′30″N 72°33′23″W
- Built: 1867
- Architect: William P. Crocker, C.W. Hazelton
- NRHP reference No.: 82004966
- Added to NRHP: May 2, 1982

Turners Falls is an unincorporated village and census-designated place in the town of Montague in Franklin County, Massachusetts, United States. The population was 4,512 at the 2020 census. It is part of the Springfield, Massachusetts Metropolitan Statistical Area. Its name is often used as a metonym for the entire town of Montague, for which it is the business district and comprises more than half the population.

== Geography ==
Turners Falls is located at 42°35′56″N 72°33′25″W (42.598943, -72.556809).

According to the United States Census Bureau, the village has a total area of 2.3 square miles (6.0 km^{2}), of which 1.9 square miles (4.9 km^{2}) is land and 0.39 square miles (1.0 km^{2}) (17.02%) is water.

== Demographics ==
Historical population
Census	Pop.	Note	%±
2010	4,470		—
2020	4,512		0.9%
U.S. Decennial Census

=== 2020 census ===
As of the 2020 census, Turners Falls had a population of 4,512. The median age was 41.8 years. 19.2% of residents were under the age of 18 and 20.6% of residents were 65 years of age or older. For every 100 females there were 94.1 males, and for every 100 females age 18 and over there were 90.3 males age 18 and over.

99.8% of residents lived in urban areas, while 0.2% lived in rural areas.

There were 2,100 households in Turners Falls, of which 22.9% had children under the age of 18 living in them. Of all households, 31.0% were married-couple households, 22.3% were households with a male householder and no spouse or partner present, and 35.0% were households with a female householder and no spouse or partner present. About 38.0% of all households were made up of individuals and 16.3% had someone living alone who was 65 years of age or older. There were 2,233 housing units, of which 6.0% were vacant. The homeowner vacancy rate was 1.9% and the rental vacancy rate was 4.1%.

Racial composition as of the 2020 census
Race	Number	Percent
White	3,859	85.5%
Black or African American	79	1.8%
American Indian and Alaska Native	31	0.7%
Asian	44	1.0%
Native Hawaiian and Other Pacific Islander	0	0.0%
Some other race	130	2.9%
Two or more races	369	8.2%
Hispanic or Latino (of any race)	382	8.5%

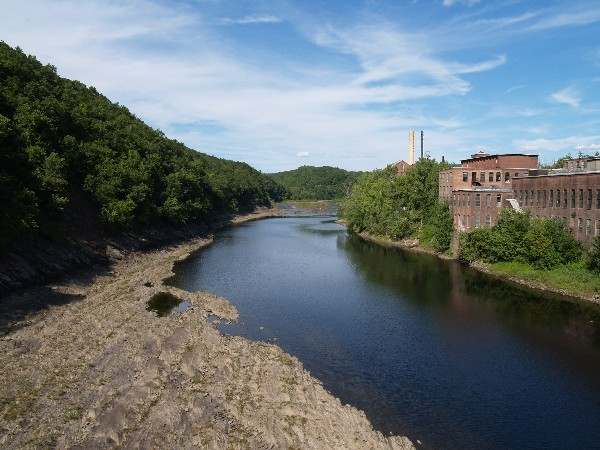
View of Connecticut River at Turners Falls (the right bank)

=== 2000 census ===
As of the census of 2000, there were 1,995 households, out of which 27.7% had children under the age of 18 living with them, 39.2% were married couples living together, 14.0% had a female householder with no husband present, and 42.2% were non-families. 35.7% of all households were made up of individuals, and 17.0% had someone living alone who was 65 years of age or older. The average household size was 2.22 and the average family size was 2.87.

In the CDP, the population was spread out, with 23.9% under the age of 18, 8.8% from 18 to 24, 26.4% from 25 to 44, 22.2% from 45 to 64, and 18.7% who were 65 years of age or older. The median age was 39 years. For every 100 females, there were 90.2 males. For every 100 females age 18 and over, there were 86.3 males.

The median income for a household in the CDP was $24,243, and the median income for a family was $38,041. Males had a median income of $30,997 versus $25,444 for females. The per capita income for the CDP was $16,446. About 13.4% of families and 18.9% of the population were below the poverty line, including 28.6% of those under age 18 and 8.9% of those age 65 or over.

== History and culture ==
The village of Turners Falls was founded in 1868 as a planned industrial community according to the plan of Alvah Crocker, a prominent man from Fitchburg who envisioned in the immense power of the waterfalls the means of establishing a great city. Crocker was influenced by other, earlier and successful experiments in Lowell and elsewhere. Crocker's vision was to attract industry to the town by offering cheap hydropower that was made by the harnessing of the Connecticut River, through the construction of a dam and canal. His development concept was to sell mill sites along the power canal to those companies and to sell individual building lots to mill workers who would come to work in the mills. The rest of the village was laid out in a horizontal grid pattern with cross streets numerically. Avenue A, the main commercial district, was designed as a grand tree lined avenue.

=== Turners Falls Massacre ===
The largest of the five villages comprising the town of Montague, Turners Falls was named after Captain William Turner, who played a key role in the region's Indian Wars. In 1676, during King Philip's War, Captain Turner led a group of about 160 mounted soldiers from Hadley and made a surprise attack on an Indian encampment located near the falls. The attack on a sleeping village of Native Americans on the Gill side of the Great Falls lasted several hours and resulted in the death of many people including many women and children. The area by the falls was traditionally shared by the Pocumtuk Confederacy, the Nipmucs, and the Wabanaki tribes because of the abundance of salmon and shad available there.

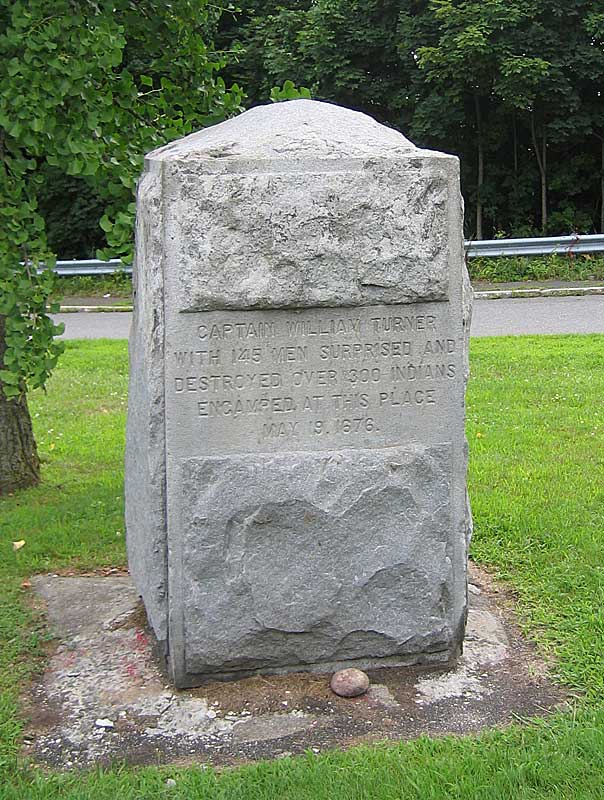
Monument on the Gill, Massachusetts, side of the Gill–Montague Bridge, with the text "Captain William Turner with 145 men surprised and destroyed over 300 Indians encamped at this place May 19, 1676"

Of the 160 attackers, at least 40 were killed in the withdrawal. Some, including the Chaplain, Reverend Hope Atherton got separated from the main body and had to find their way alone; a few were successful while others never returned. Captain Turner's body was found about a month later and was buried on a bluff west of where he fell. A tablet marks the spot today.

The Turners Falls massacre was called the Battle of Turner's Falls at the time and is often viewed as a turning point in the King Philip's War. As the historian Russell Bourne points out, “After the Peskeompskut massacre, allied sachems openly discussed the strategy of King Phillip, the name given to the Native American leader Metacom, and sending his head to the English as a prelude to peace negotiations”. Within one month of the massacre, the English offensive in the Connecticut Valley ended suddenly. The end of King Philip's War came not long afterward.

In recognition of the tragic nature of the Turners Falls massacre, the Board of Selectmen and Town of Montague, as part of its 250th anniversary, joined with representatives of various Native American tribes on May 19, 2004, in a Reconciliation Day ceremony.

== Historic district ==
The central portion of the village is a historic district on the National Register of Historic Places. Known as the Turners Falls Historic District, it is roughly bounded by the Connecticut River, Power Canal, 9th Street and L Street. The Renaissance Community owned several properties and businesses in downtown Turners Falls from 1972 to 1980.

== Points of interest ==
- Turners Falls Canal
- Great Falls Discovery Center
- Gill–Montague Bridge
- The Shea Theater
- Canalside Rail Trail

== Notable people ==
- Robert E. Bourdeau, astrophysicist and Explorer 8 Project Manager
- Rico Brogna, former Major League baseball first baseman
- Philip H. Hoff (1924–2018), 73rd Governor of Vermont
- Walter Kostanski (1923–2015), Massachusetts state representative and funeral director

== See also ==
- National Register of Historic Places listings in Franklin County, Massachusetts
- Renaissance Community
