= Turners Falls branch =

The Turners Falls branch was the name of two abandoned railway lines in the United States:

- Turners Falls branch (Boston and Maine Railroad), opened in 1868 and abandoned in 1947
- Turners Falls branch (New Haven), opened in 1882 and abandoned in 1985
