= Scattershot =

Scattershot may refer to:

- Scattershot (book), a 2008 memoir by David Lovelace
- Scattershot (Transformers), a Transformers character
