= Charles Root =

Charles Root may refer to:

- Charlie Root (1899–1970), American right-handed pitcher in Major League Baseball
- Charles Boudinot Root (1818–1903), American silversmith
- Charles W. Root, American lawyer and politician in Minnesota
