= Scattershot (book) =

Scattershot: My Bipolar Family
- First edition cover
- Author: David Lovelace
- Language: English
- Genre: Nonfiction, memoir
- Publisher: Dutton Adult
- Publication date: 4 September 2008
- Publication place: United States
- Media type: Print (Hardback)
- Pages: 304 pp (Hardback edition)
- ISBN: 978-0-525-95078-3
- OCLC: 220420253
- Dewey Decimal: 616.89/5 22
- LC Class: RC516 .L68 2008

Scattershot: My Bipolar Family is a 2008 memoir, written by American writer, carpenter, and former Montague Bookmill proprietor David Lovelace, published by Dutton Adult. Lovelace's memoir chronicles the challenges of growing up in a family in which four out of five members suffer from bipolar disorder, including Lovelace himself. Only his sister, who is a professional therapist, was spared the ravages of bipolar disorder, while both his parents, his brother, and himself, have suffered to differing degrees over the years.

Lovelace has written poetry, some of which has been nominated for the Pushcart Prize and the Patterson Review's Allen Ginsberg Award. He currently resides in western Massachusetts with his wife and children.

== Description ==
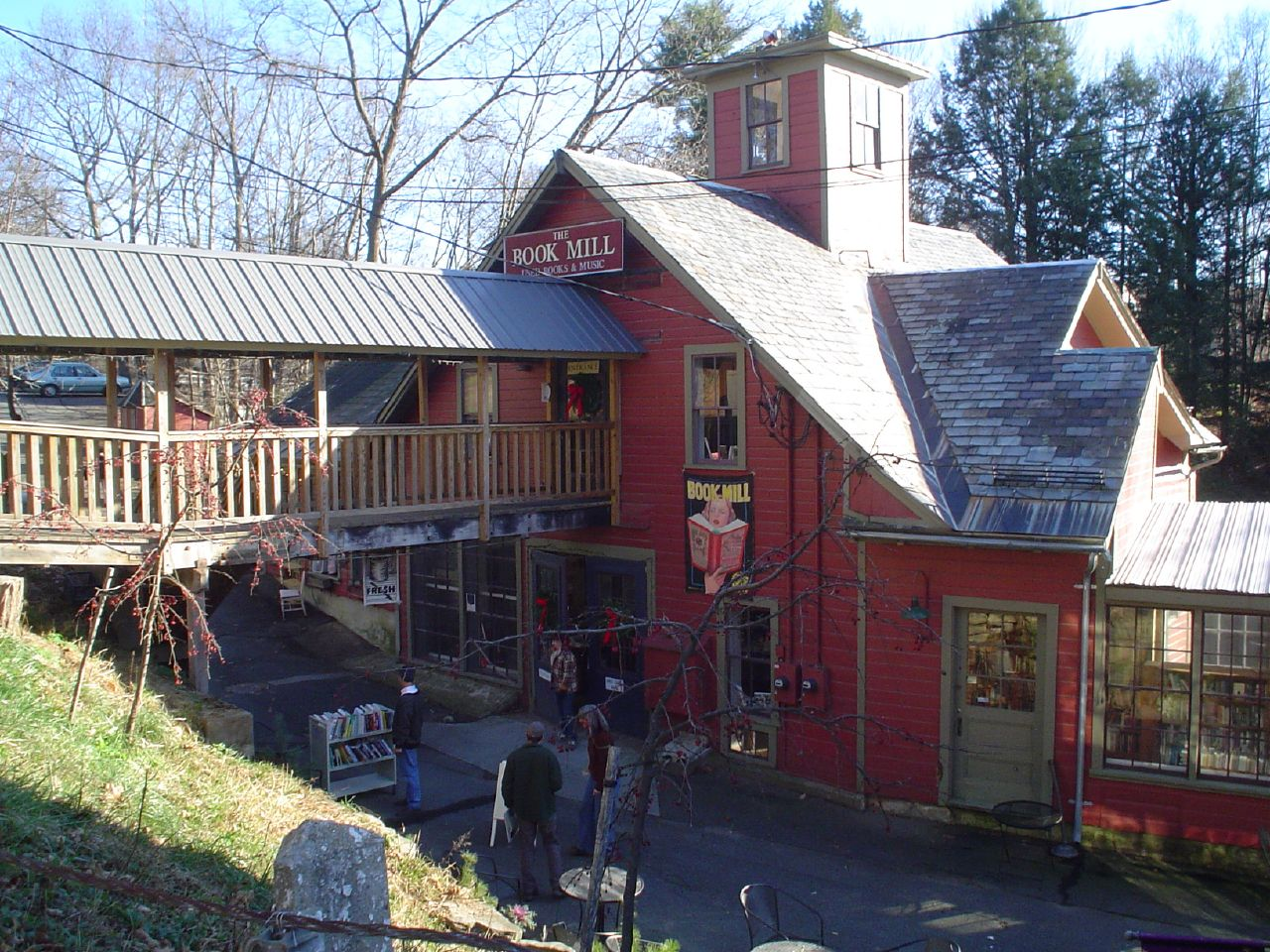
The front entrance to The Bookmill in Montague, Massachusetts.

A native of Massachusetts, Lovelace's relationship with bipolar disorder began at an early age, when his mother, an artist, suffered from severe bouts of depression, and later when his father, a professor of Theology at Gordon-Conwell Theological Seminary, exhibited increasingly eccentric behavior. He and his brother followed suit with their own symptoms as they grew up, developing similar mood and psychological disorders, a common problem for the family—excepting Lovelace's sister, who has always had her mental health—which they privately termed the "whim-whams".

The memoir uses ample humor to chronicle Lovelace's childhood and his early adulthood growing up in and around Hamilton, Massachusetts with bipolar disorder; it shines a light on the positive aspects of bipolar disorder, such as the remarkable creative gifts it can bestow upon the afflicted, while being, unfortunately, totally devastating on other occasions.

== Reception ==
Scattershot is described by Alex Miller in the Vail Daily as "disturbing in places", yet "funny in others". In comparison to other memoirs, he states that "it’s very evenly portrayed, without any finger-pointing". Whitney Spotts of the Lansing State Journal states that "the author manages to convey the dark corners of bi-polar disorder from a tender, understanding place."

Publishers Weekly praised "Lovelace's poetic prose [as] both matter-of-fact and haunted, capturing the unpredictable rhythms of mental illness" and believed "[r]eaders will get a real sense of the interior world of a single patient, and a family, on the verge of a mental breakdown." Eric Liebetrau, in the Charleston City Paper, writes that "Lovelace's prose mimics his fragile mental condition, accelerating to a breathless poetry during his manic phases and slowing to a near-catatonic whisper during the depressive phases."

According to the book's publisher, there was initially interest in a movie adaptation; the section of the Dutton Gotham Books Fall 2008 Catalog on the book states: "Leonardo DiCaprio and Bill Monahan, the Oscar-winning screenwriter of The Departed, are both attached to this property in Hollywood, and a deal with a major studio is expected shortly."
