= Turners Falls branch (Boston and Maine Railroad) =

Former railway line in Franklin County, Massachusetts, United States

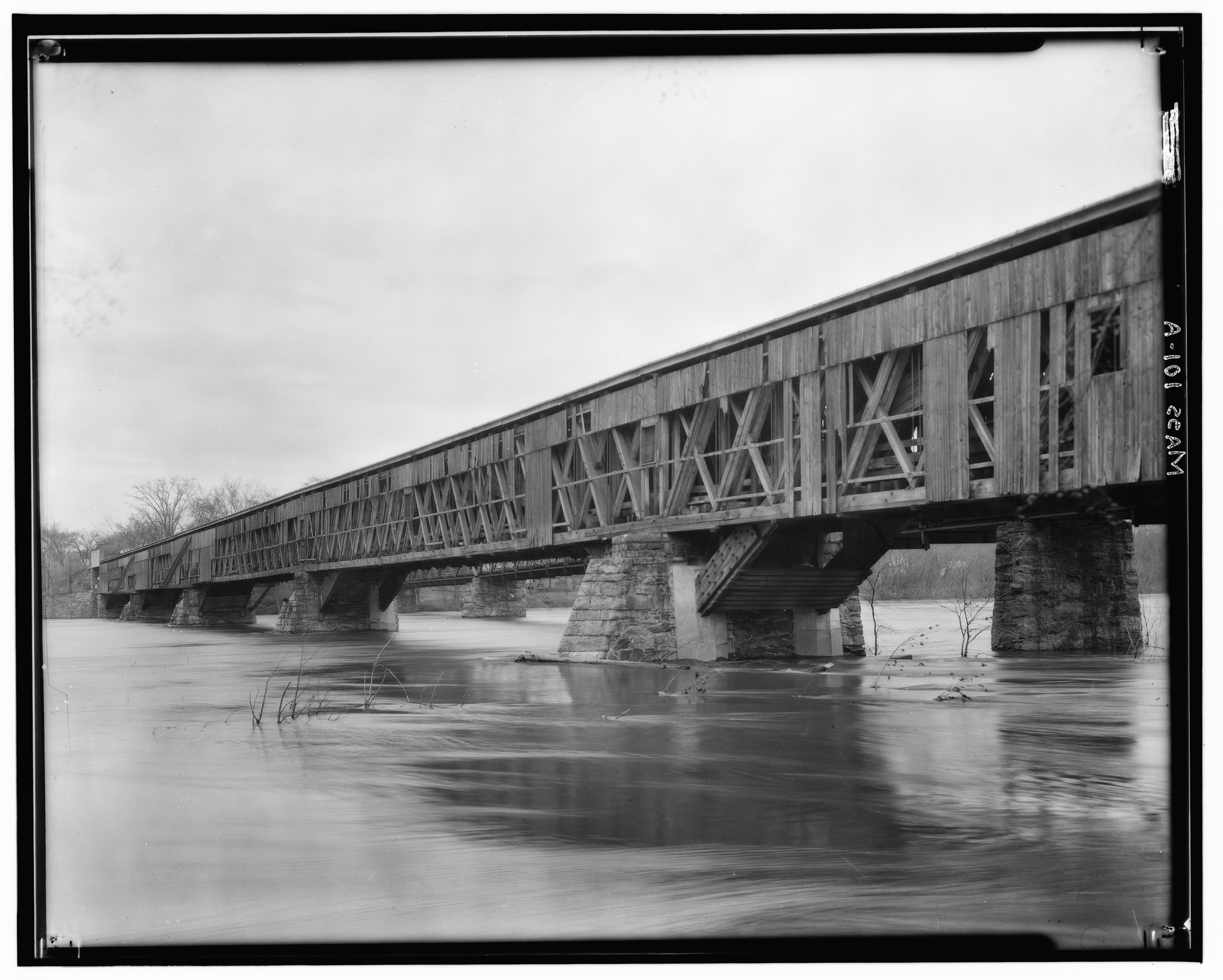
- The Montague City Covered Bridge, on which the line crossed the Connecticut River, in 1934

Overview
- Status: Abandoned
- Owner: Vermont and Massachusetts Railroad (1868–1874); Fitchburg Railroad (1874–1900); Boston and Maine Railroad (1900-1947)

History
- Opened: 1868
- Closed: 1947

Technical
- Line length: 3.0 mi (4.8 km)
- Track gauge: 1,435 mm (4 ft 8 1/2 in) standard gauge

The Turners Falls branch was a railway line in Franklin County, Massachusetts, in the United States. It ran 3 miles (4.8 km) from a junction with the Fitchburg route east of Greenfield, Massachusetts, to Turners Falls, Massachusetts. It was originally built in 1868 by the Vermont and Massachusetts Railroad, later part of the Boston and Maine Railroad. The B&M acquired the New Haven's Turners Falls branch in 1947 and abandoned its own line. Part of the abandoned line is now the Canalside Rail Trail.

== History ==
The Vermont and Massachusetts Railroad built the Turners Falls branch in 1868. The line crossed the Connecticut River and ran due north into Turners Falls, Massachusetts. The passenger depot was located downtown, near 7th Street and A Avenue. An industrial spur crossed the Turners Falls Canal to serve various industries there. The Fitchburg Railroad leased the V&M in 1874; the Boston and Maine Railroad (B&M) leased the Fitchburg in 1900.

The B&M obtained trackage rights over the New Haven branch in 1925, and these rights became more important after a flood in 1936 destroyed the B&M's bridge over the Connecticut River. The New Haven ceased operating over its own branch in 1943, and the B&M acquired the portion between Cheapside and Turners Falls in 1947. The B&M then abandoned the remainder of its original branch, save the industrial spur that crossed the canal. That remainder was abandoned with the rest of the former New Haven branch in 1985. Part of the former B&M route along the canal is now part of the Canalside Rail Trail, which opened in 2008.
