= Turners Falls branch (New Haven) =

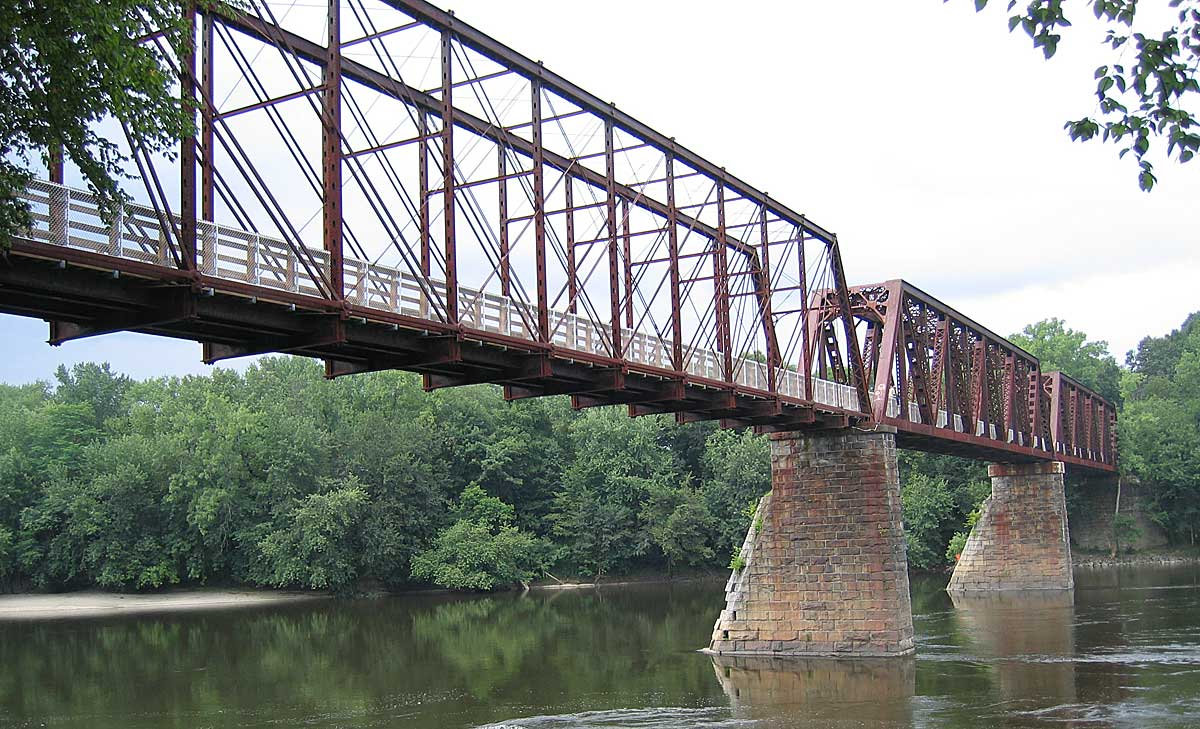
- The former bridge over the Connecticut River

Overview
- Status: Abandoned
- Owner: New Haven and Northampton Railroad (1882–1887); New York, New Haven and Hartford Railroad (1887–1947); Boston and Maine Railroad (1947–1985)

History
- Opened: 1882
- South Deerfield–Cheapside abandoned: 1943
- B&M ownership: 1947
- Closed: 1985

Technical
- Line length: 9 mi (14 km)
- Track gauge: 1,435 mm (4 ft 8 1/2 in) standard gauge

The Turners Falls branch was a railway line in Franklin County, Massachusetts, in the United States. It ran 9 miles (14 km) from a junction with the Shelburne Falls Extension at South Deerfield, Massachusetts, to Turners Falls, Massachusetts. It was originally built in 1868 by the New Haven and Northampton Railroad, later part of the New York, New Haven and Hartford Railroad. The Boston and Maine Railroad, which had its own branch to Turners Falls, acquired the Turners Falls branch from the New Haven in 1947 and abandoned its own line. The B&M subsequently abandoned the branch in 1985. Part of it is now the Canalside Rail Trail.

== History ==
In 1881, New Haven and Northampton Railroad (NH&N) built north from Northampton, Massachusetts, toward the Troy and Greenfield Railroad. This line, known as the Shelburne Falls Extension, ran parallel to the Connecticut River Line of the Fitchburg Railroad. The Turners Falls line branched off this extension at South Deerfield, Massachusetts, and ran north into Turners Falls, Massachusetts. The Fitchburg possessed its own branch to Turners Falls, originally built by the Vermont and Massachusetts Railroad in 1868.

The New York, New Haven and Hartford Railroad leased the NH&N in 1887, while the Boston and Maine Railroad (B&M) leased the Fitchburg Railroad in 1900. The New Haven abandoned the Shelburne Falls Extension between South Deerfield and the connection with the former Troy and Greenfield Railroad, now the Fitchburg main line, in 1923. The B&M obtained trackage rights over the branch in 1925, and these rights became more important after a flood in 1936 destroyed the B&M's bridge over the Connecticut River.

The New Haven abandoned the branch between South Deerfield and Cheapside in 1943. The B&M bought the remainder of the branch in 1947 and abandoned its own branch, except for some industrial trackage in Turners Falls. Although the B&M received some state money in the late 1970s for rehabilitating the branch, service ceased in October 1981, and the B&M filed for abandonment in 1985.

The Canalside Rail Trail, which opened in 2008, incorporates portions of both Turners Falls branches, including the former New Haven bridge over the Connecticut River.
