= Montague Center Historic District =

Historic district in Massachusetts, United States

- U.S. National Register of Historic Places
- U.S. Historic district
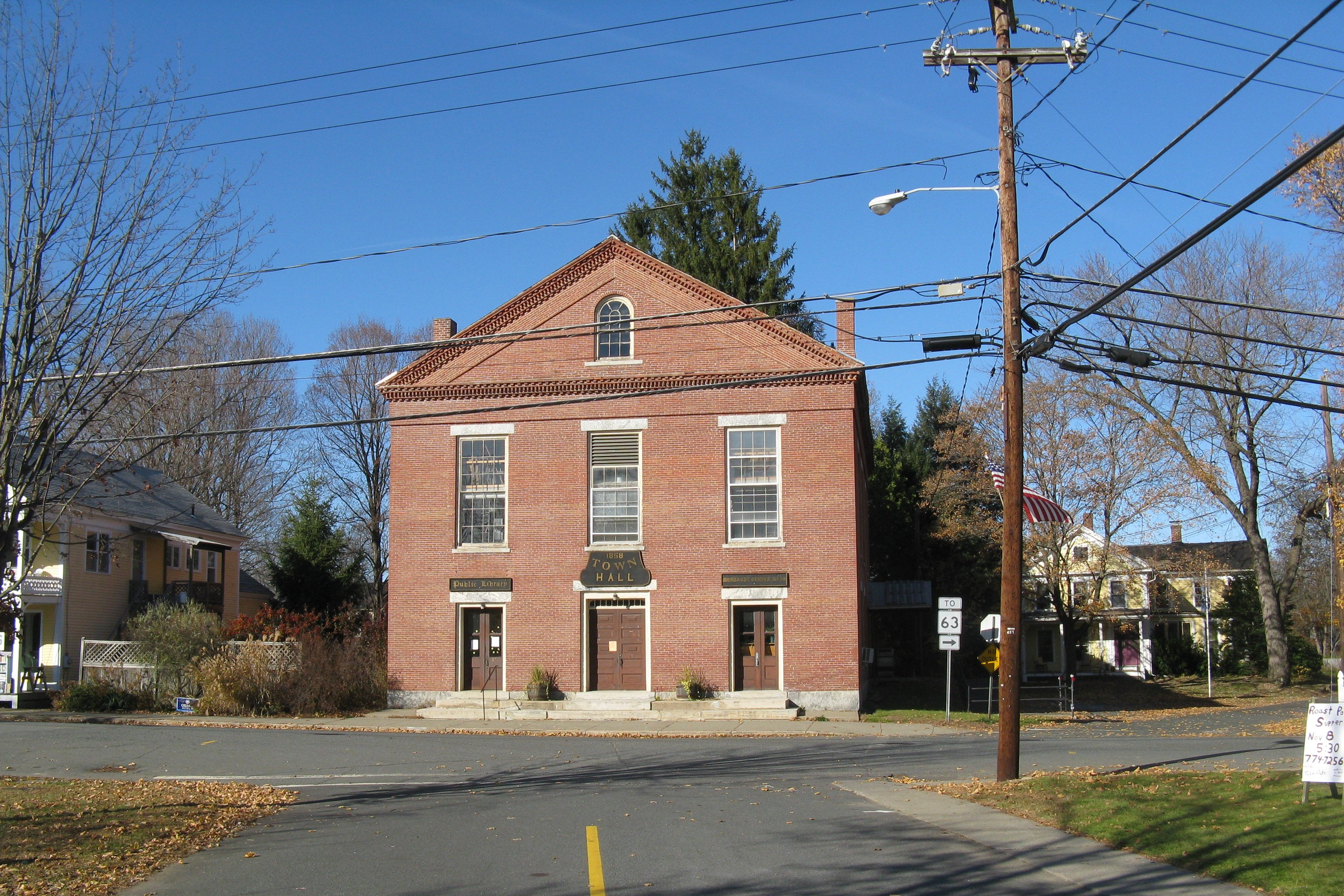
- 1858 Town Hall

- Location within Massachusetts Location within the United States
- Location: Center, Main, North, School, and Union Sts.. Montague, Massachusetts
- Coordinates: 42°32′6″N 72°32′5″W
- Area: 170 acres (69 ha)
- Built: 1751
- Architect: multiple
- Architectural style: Colonial, Greek Revival
- NRHP reference No.: 01001236
- Added to NRHP: November 16, 2001

The Montague Center Historic District encompasses the well-preserved 19th century village center of Montague, Massachusetts. Montague Center, one of the town's five villages, is the civic heart of the town, and was also an active industrial area in the 19th century. The district was listed on the National Register of Historic Places in 2001.

== Description and history ==
The village of Montague Center, one of five, is located in the central-southern part of the incorporated Town of Montague, with the Saw Mill River flowing generally westward on the north and east sides of the village. Main Street runs through the village with a minor westward jog in the center of the village, deviating from its generally northerly track. The east-west portion of this jog has a triangular green at its eastern end, with Center Street running eastward and North Street running north.

Further south on Main Street is a smaller triangle that forms the split-tail end of Old Sunderland Road at Main Street. In this triangular green is a tall sign-post box with several 18th-century signs giving directions to nearby towns, one of which is purportedly fake.

Originally the entirety of the town, splitting off from Sunderland in 1752, Montague Center took shape in the 19th century as the site of an early gristmill and the intersection of two east-west and north-south roads. Main Street is where the most significant buildings in the village lie, along with North and Center Streets, which line the town common. A school and two churches from the 1830s flanked the common, as did the 1858 town hall, now the village library. The oldest building in the district is the Root Tavern that dates to about 1734, now a home.

The district also includes the Alvah Stone Mill, now known as the Bookmill, separately listed on the National Register; it is located on the Saw Mill River.

== See also ==
- National Register of Historic Places listings in Franklin County, Massachusetts
