= Lake Pleasant, Massachusetts =

Village in Massachusetts, United States

Coordinates: 42°33′23″N 72°31′05″W

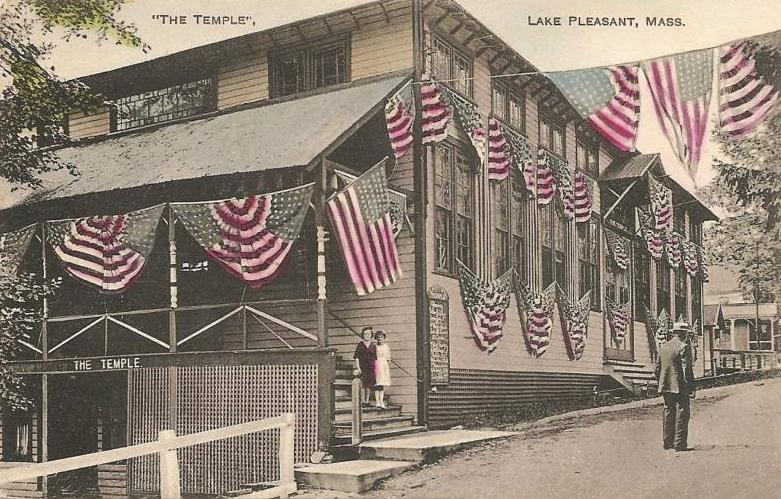
The Temple c. 1908

Lake Pleasant is a village in Montague, Franklin County, Massachusetts, United States. It is also the site of an early and prominent American Spiritualist campground. It claims to be the oldest continuously-existing Spiritualist community in the United States.

Lake Pleasant was founded in 1870 as a "campmeeting grounds" with 75 tent lots, and by 1872 was popular with Spiritualists for summer tenting. In 1874 the New England Spiritualist Campmeeting Association (NESCA) was organized by Henry Buddington and Joseph Beals, and in 1879 formally incorporated. The village rapidly expanded to 90 small cottages, and 50 acres (200,000 m^{2}) around the lake were divided into many more camping lots. At its peak, circa 1900, Lake Pleasant contained 196 homes and cottages, swelling in August to as many as 2,000 residents. Lake Pleasant was one of a couple dozen Spiritualist camp meetings in the Northeast during this time, including Onset Bay, Grove in Wareham, Massachusetts, Queen City Park in Burlington, Vermont, and Lily Dale, outside Jamestown, New York.

Emma Hardinge Britten, one of the many invited speakers at Lake Pleasant, painted this portrait of the community in 1880:

Its attractions are manifold — embracing every variety of inland scenery — everything possible for the comfort and convenience of visitors, and ample facilities for amusement and recreation. The lake is a beautiful sheet of about one hundred and eight acres, and is within a mile of another lake of sixty acres. Bath houses are located at convenient points on the shore, a commodious wharf lies near the foot of the stairs leading to the grove from the railroad station, and a flotilla of boats is always in readiness to take out pleasure or fishing parties. An elegant Pavilion stands on an elevated plateau overlooking the grove on the one side, and the railroad station on the other, accessible from each by easy flights of stairs. . . . From the first peep of day, the campers are astir, lighting gipsy fires, preparing breakfast, and trading with the various hawkers who ply with their provisions regularly through the white-tented streets. After the morning meal, visits are exchanged, and the business of the day proceeds with as much energy and order as in the cities. Sailing parties, séances, amusements, and business, all proceed in due course, until the hour for speaking arrives, when thousands assemble at the speaker’s stand, to partake of the solid intellectual refreshment of the day. Lectures, balls, parties, illuminations, public discussions, &c., &c., fill up the time until midnight, when the white tents enclose the slumbering hosts; the fires and lamps are extinguished, and the pale moonbeam shines over rocks, groves, and lakes, illumining scenes as strange and picturesque as ever the eye of mortal gazed upon. . . . Bookstalls abound, photographs of spirits and mortals are on sale, and literature is rapidly changing hands. Healing, trance, test, and physical Mediums, put out their signs, and ply their professional avocations as industriously here as at home.

Lake Pleasant's decline began in 1907 with a fire that destroyed 130 homes, and its fate was sealed when the lake itself became a public water supply off limits to recreation. As property values declined, many buildings were acquired by the water department for demolition. From 1913 to 1976, Lake Pleasant was home to two competing Spiritualist organizations, each with its own temple and followers, namely the original NESCA, affiliated with the National Spiritualist Association of Churches, and The National Spiritual Alliance established in 1913. The two groups differed on questions of reincarnation. The NECSA temple burned down in 1955, and NECSA itself disbanded in 1976.

== Old postcards ==
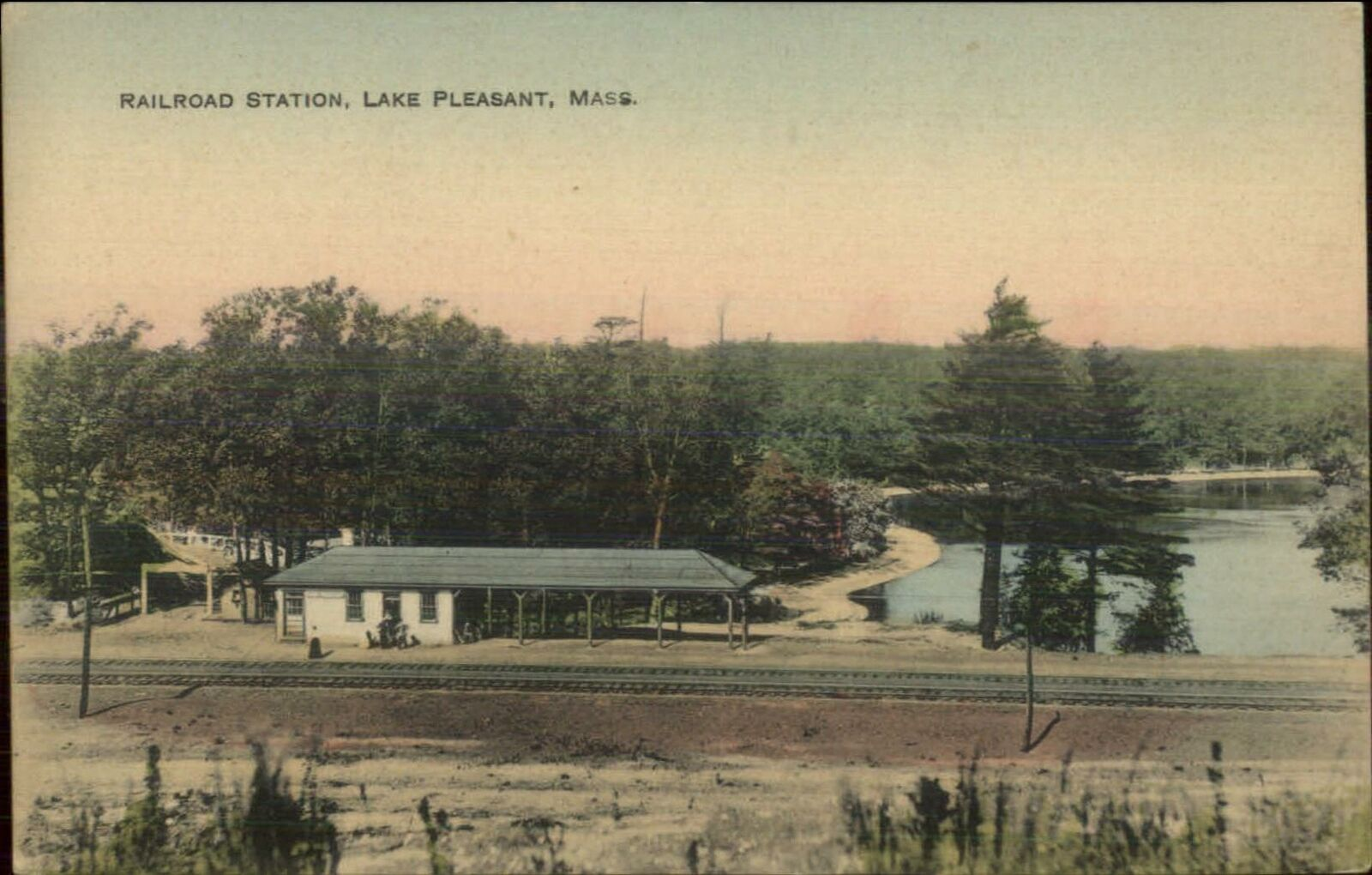
Railroad Station

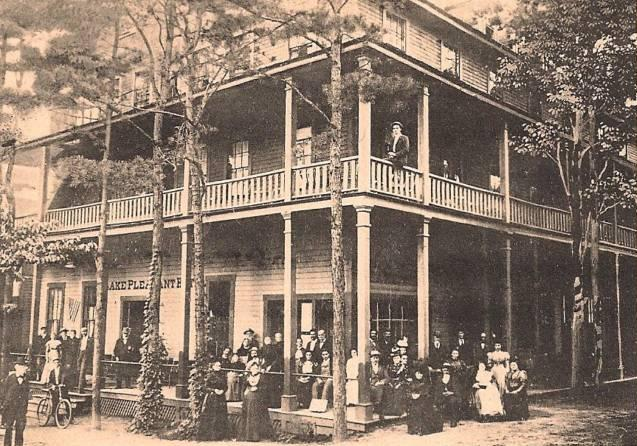
The Lake Pleasant Hotel

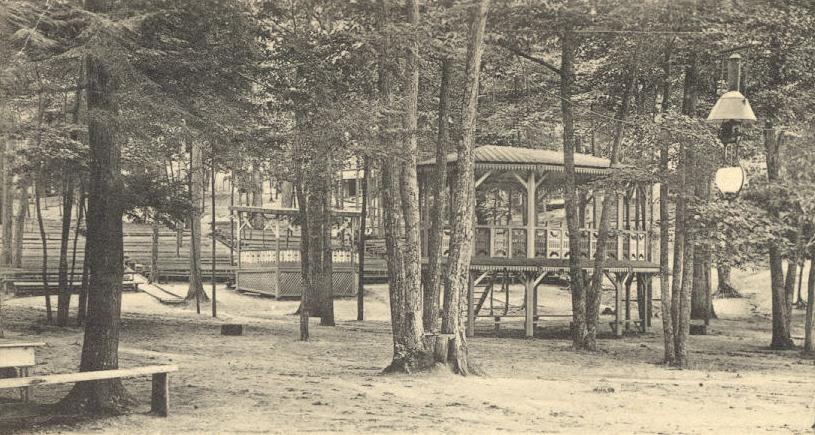
Picnic Grove

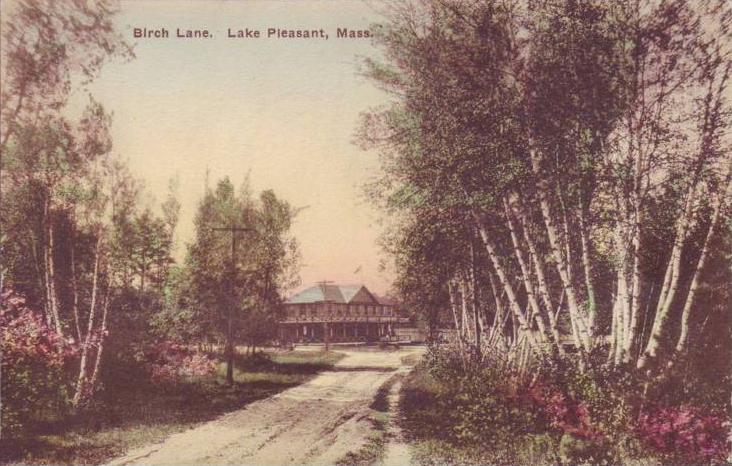
Birch Lane
