= Canalside Rail Trail Bridge =

Bridge in Massachusetts, US

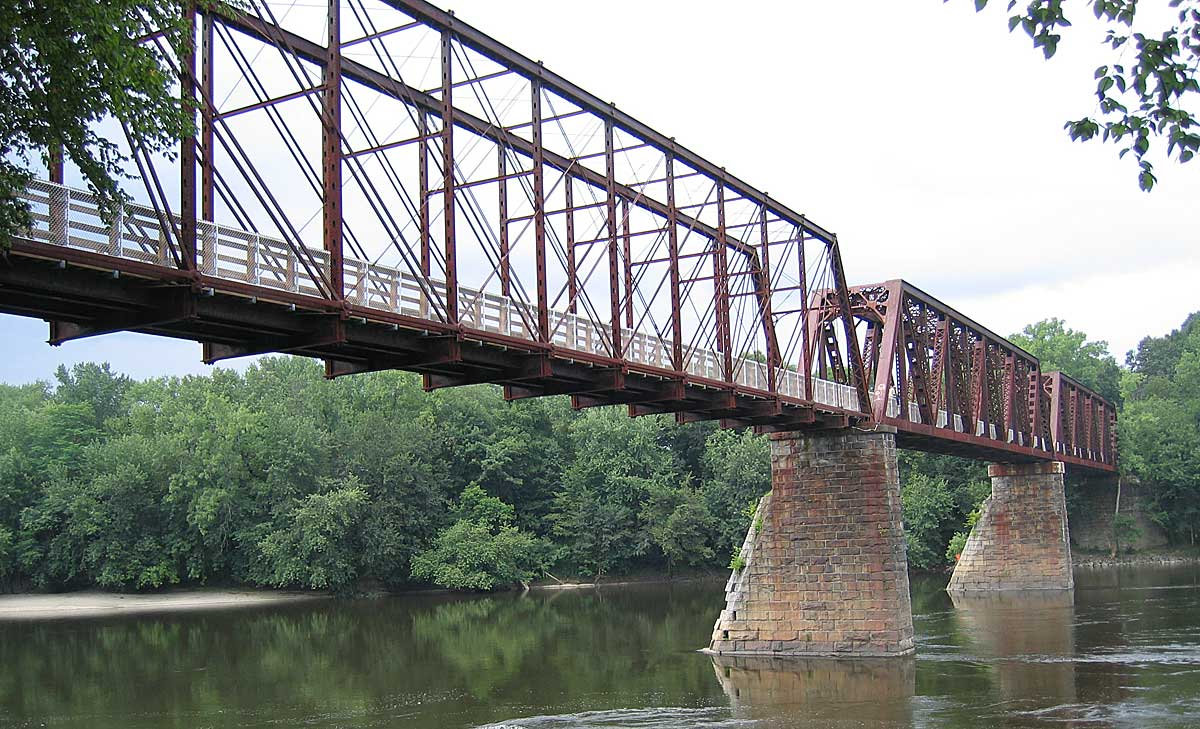
- Coordinates: 42°34′45.3″N 72°34′29.53″W
- Carries: Canalside Rail Trail
- Crosses: Connecticut River
- Locale: Deerfield / Montague, Franklin County, Massachusetts, USA
- ID number: D06033/M28019

Characteristics
- Design: Through truss bridge 1 × Whipple truss 2 × Warren truss
- Material: Cast or Wrought Iron, on masonry piers
- No. of spans: 3
- Piers in water: 2

History
- Opened: 1880, 1936, 2006

The Canalside Rail Trail Bridge (also known as the New York, New Haven and Hartford Railroad (Turners Falls Branch) Bridge) is a former New York, New Haven and Hartford Railroad (Turner Falls Branch) rail bridge across the Connecticut River between Deerfield and Montague, Massachusetts. The bridge (Massachusetts numbers: D06033/M28019) is on the Massachusetts Historic Bridge Inventory as a "Historic Metal Truss Bridge", currently the sixth oldest metal truss bridge on the state-wide historic registry. The Canalside Rail Trail, completed in Spring 2008, incorporates this bridge.

== History and construction of the bridge ==
Originally built in 1880 by Keystone Bridge Co., Pittsburgh, Pennsylvania, two of its three spans were knocked off their piers by the floating Montague City Covered Bridge during the 1936 flood. Subsequently, those spans were rebuilt and replaced in 1936 by the Phoenix Bridge Company, Phoenixville, Pennsylvania. The remaining span of the original bridge is the oldest surviving span across the Connecticut River. The older span is a Whipple truss design. The newer spans use a modified Warren truss design (vertical truss members are added to the traditional form of a Warren truss).

The bridge was refurbished in 2006 to be part of the new Canalside Rail Trail. However, though the bridge can now be used, the refurbishing is not complete as of July 2007. The western pier has some stones out of place and some stones fallen off. There is currently work going on to fix this issue.

== Image gallery ==
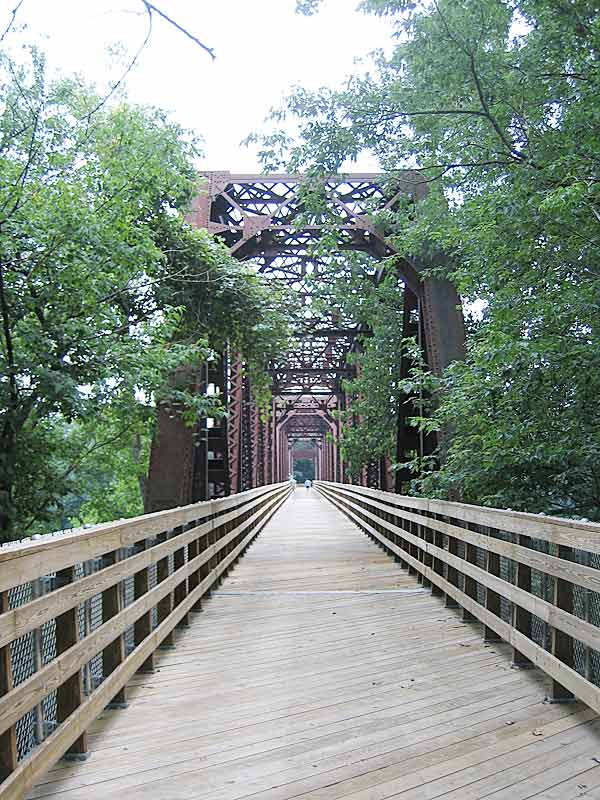
Looking west along the length of the bridge from the eastern end, you can see the newly constructed wooden bridge deck and the safety railings.

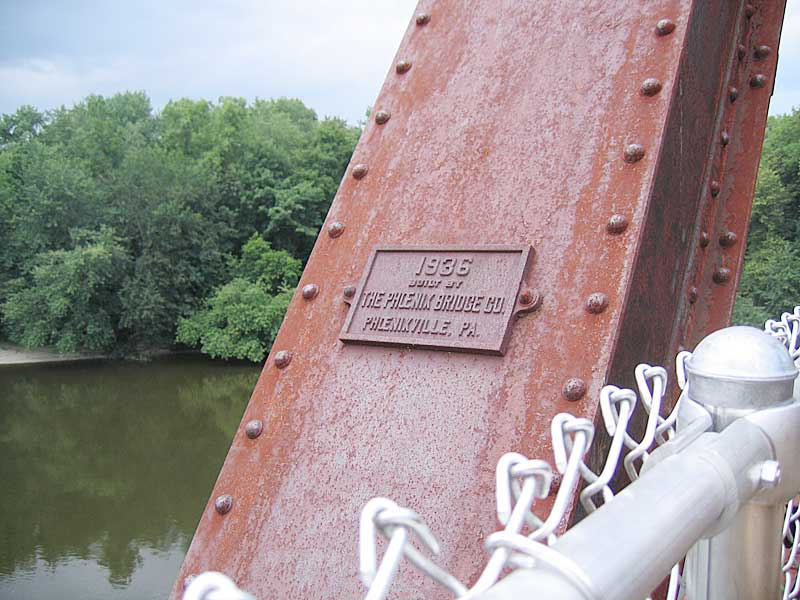
This image shows the plate bolted to the western end of the first of the "new" spans put up in 1936.

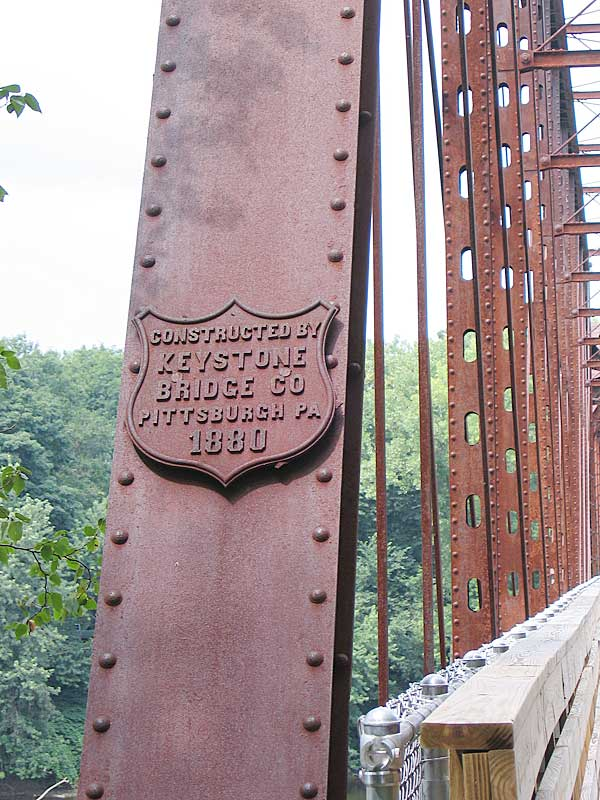
This image shows the plate put up by the Keystone Bridge Company on the one span of the bridge which is circa 1880.

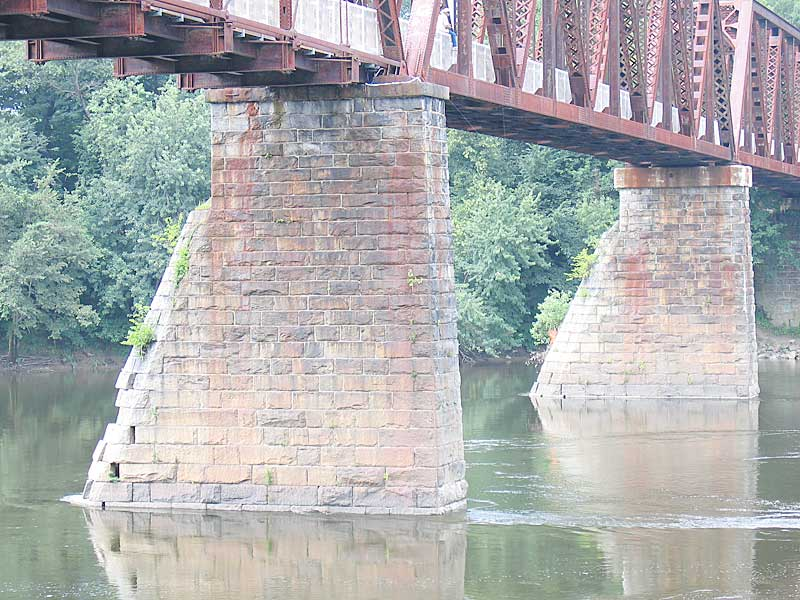
This image shows the bridge piers, including some of the lesser damage sustained by the western pier.

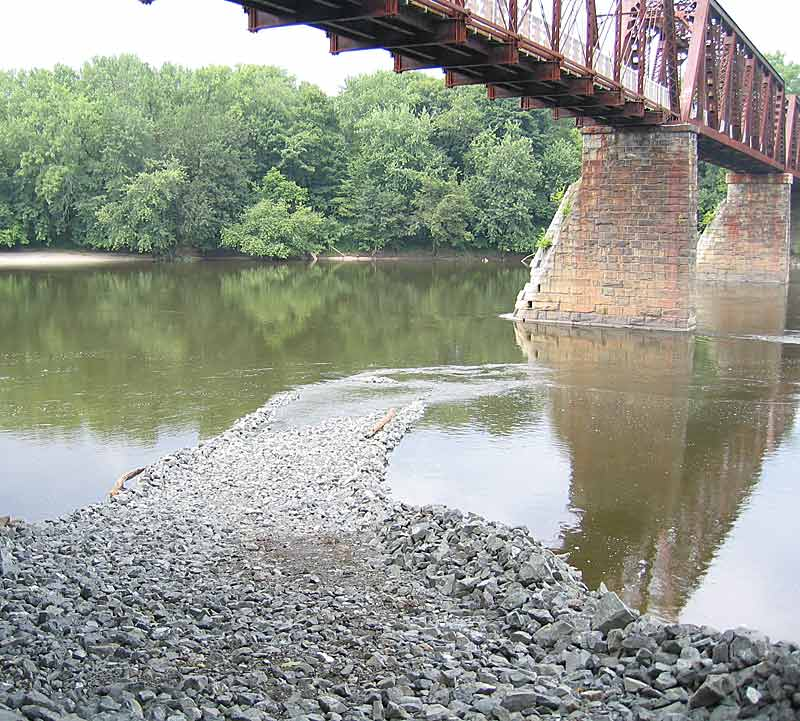
Here is the temporary road being built so that repairs can be made to the western pier.

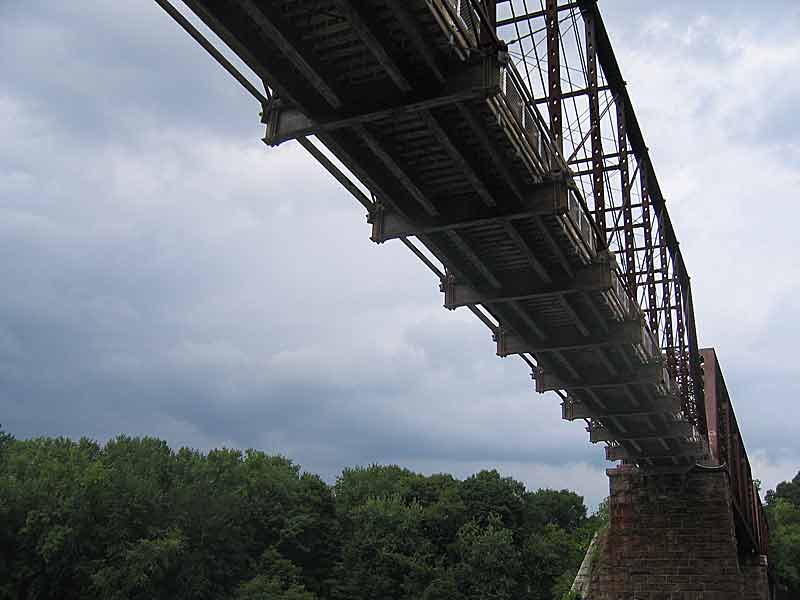
Underside of the rail bridge, showing the main deck supports

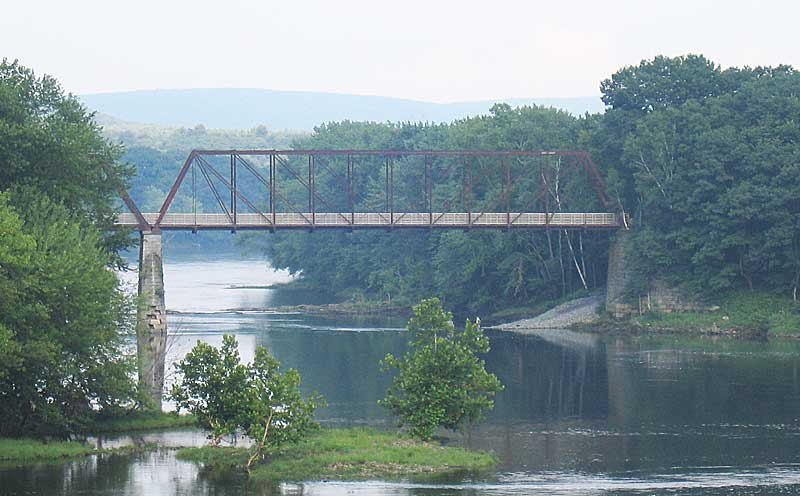
The oldest span of the three, from the north

== See also ==
- List of crossings of the Connecticut River

== Notes ==
A: "MassHighway must possess evidence that the bridge has been individually listed in, or has been found eligible for individual listing in, the National Register of Historic Places. Bridges that have been found to be contributing elements within National Register-listed or -eligible historic districts, but that do not appear to possess characteristics that would qualify them for individual listing in the National Register, are NOT included in the list."
B: Project 604128 DEERFIELD- MONTAGUE- BIKE TRAIL CONSTRUCTION, FRANKLIN COUNTY BIKEWAY (PHASE I, Part A) This proposed project was originally a part of Project # 602958 Franklin County Bikeway (Phase 1, Part B) in Montague that was advertised August 23, 2003. This phase of the bikeway project begins at McClelland Farm Road and continues north along existing abandoned railroad right-of-way before terminating at Montague City Road for a distance of approximately 1.3 miles. The project also includes the modification of the three span, wood trestle, former railroad bridge over the Connecticut River into a bikeway bridge.

# Location:   Town of Montague
Construction Begins:  Winter 2005/2006
Construction Ends:  Spring 2008
Resident Engineer:  John Burek [Email MassHighway]
Construction Contract Value:  $1,816,361.00
Construction Bid Price:   $1,616,692.50
Initial Construction Estimate:  $1,164,690.00
MassHighway District:   District 2
Current Status:   Bike path under construction (as of 04/10/2006)
Additional Info:  Project suspended for winter (as of 12/05/2007)
# 43206 -- Construction Contract
PF# 604128 - DEERFIELD- MONTAGUE- BIKE TRAIL CONSTRUCTION, FRANKLIN COUNTY BIKEWAY (PHASE I, Part A)  99% Complete
# 97333 -- Design -- Bike/Ped Projects
FRANKLIN COUNTY BIKEWAY   Final
Notice to Proceed:  01/24/2006
Project Designer:   Municipality
Funding Source:   Surface Trans. Program
Current Status
Bike path under construction
Additional Info
Project suspended for winter
Project Initiation Form   PRC Submitted   11/07/2003
Project Review Committee  Received  12/01/2003
Project Review Committee  PRC Approved  12/03/2003
Project Review Committee  Letter  12/30/2003
Project Status  Advertised  09/25/2004
Highway Design Process  Type Study Received   03/01/2004
Highway Design Process  Type Study Comments to DE   05/07/2004
Highway Design Process  1st Structural Submission Received  06/29/2001
Highway Design Process  1st Structural Comments to DE   07/19/2001
Highway Design Process  2nd Structural Design Received  06/29/2001
Highway Design Process  2nd Structural Comments to DE   07/19/2001
Highway Design Process  Subsequent Comments to DE   09/21/2004
Highway Design Process  Subsequent Comments to DE   12/09/2004
Highway Design Process  Bridge Design Approved  01/26/2005
25% Design  25% Plans Received  04/16/1999
25% Design  25% Comments to DE  11/10/1999
25% Design  Design Public Hearing   06/15/2000
75% Design  75% Plans Received  07/01/2001
75% Design  75% Comments to DE  10/30/2001
100% Design   100% Plans Received   05/27/2004
100% Design   100% Plans Received   06/25/2004
Final Design  PS&E to CEPO  09/20/2004
Final Design  PS&E Received   11/11/2004
100% Design Review  100% Plans Received   06/03/2004
100% Signs/Markings   100% Plans Approved   06/29/2004
100% TCA  100% Plans Approved   06/08/2004
ENV STATUS  Section Cleared - Federal Aid   06/30/2005
Document/Plan Submissions   0   06/29/2004
