= Charles Boudinot Root =

American silversmith (1818–1903)

Charles Boudinot Root (1818? – May 7, 1903) was a silversmith and a prominent North Carolina citizen of the 19th century. He became president of the Raleigh, North Carolina Gas Company shortly after the American Civil War. He served in this capacity for eighteen years. A native of New England, and descended from a prominent family, he was born in Montague, Massachusetts, on October 31, 1818, or September 12, 1819.

== Business and public career ==
He came to Raleigh after studying at the academy in Greenfield, Massachusetts, and spending a short period in New York City. Root became involved in trade when he arrived in Raleigh in 1837. He managed a jewelry business owned by Bernard Dupuy for five years, before buying the company out on November 15, 1843. He sold the firm in 1860 and was never involved in business trade afterward.

For a decade (1852–1862) he was director of North Carolina Mutual Life Insurance Company, of Raleigh. Root was elected tax collector of Raleigh in 1884 and also served as a city alderman and chairman of county commissioners.

== Marriage ==
Root was married to Anne Freeman Gales Root (1821–1894). She was the daughter of Weston Raleigh Gales (1803–1848), a Raleigh editor and the niece of Joseph Gales, once the editor of the National Intelligencer. Anne's personal correspondence, primarily her letters to her daughter, Love, written between 1841 and 1872, are now a part of the Wilson Library collection of the University of North Carolina at Chapel Hill.

== Death ==
Root died in Raleigh in 1903.
