= Canalside Rail Trail =

Trail in Massachusetts, United States

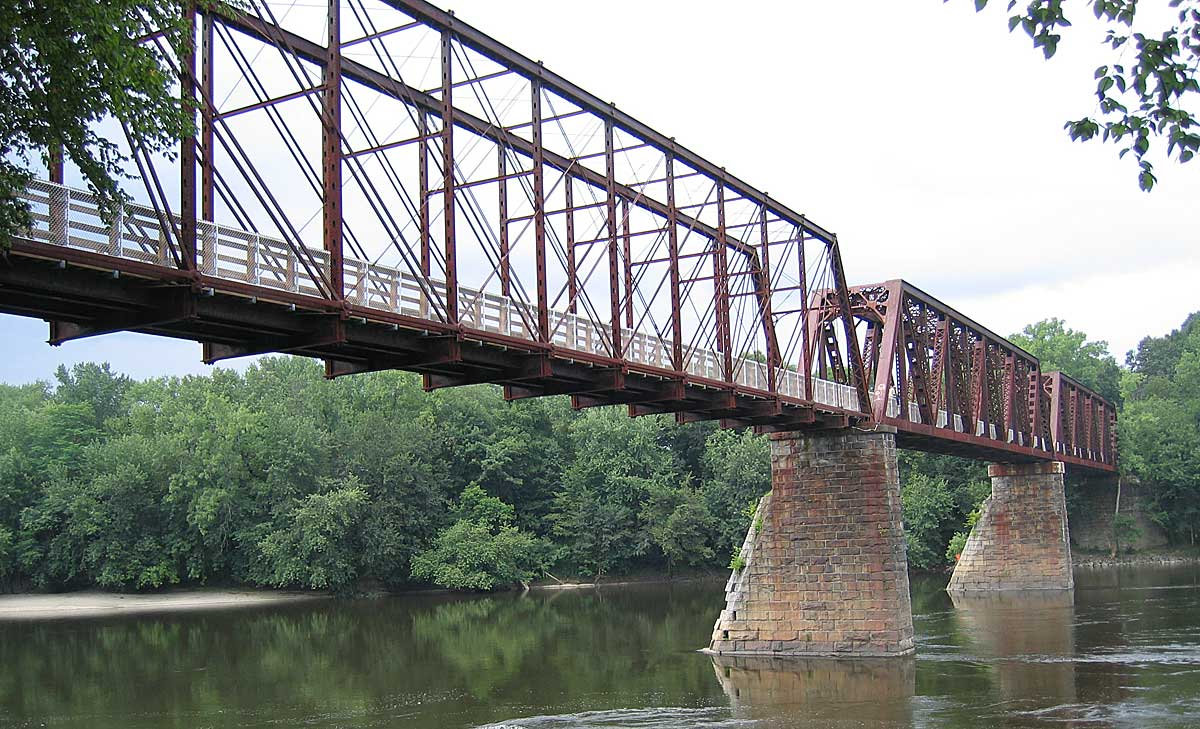
- Canalside Rail Trail Bridge over the Connecticut River
- Length: 3.8 miles (6.1 km)
- Location: Connecticut River Valley; Franklin County, Massachusetts
- Established: 2008
- Designation: Massachusetts state park
- Trailheads: East Deerfield (42°34′23″N 72°34′31″W); Turners Falls, Montague (42°36′22″N 72°33′00″W)
- Use: Hiking, biking
- Difficulty: Easy
- Sights: Connecticut River, Power Canal, Deerfield River
- Surface: Paved
- Maintained by: Department of Conservation and Recreation
- Website: Canalside Rail Trail Location of trailheads in Massachusetts

The Canalside Rail Trail is a 3.8-mile (6.1 km) trail, partially on old railroad beds, from East Deerfield to Turners Falls in Montague, Massachusetts, US. A short portion of the trail runs along town streets, but the majority is on a paved trail from which motor vehicles are prohibited. The northern terminus is Unity Park, on Barton's Cove in Turners Falls. The southernmost portion crosses the Connecticut River on the Canalside Rail Trail Bridge and ends at McClelland Farm Road in Deerfield. The trail was completed in spring 2008.

== See also ==
- Turners Falls branch (New Haven)
