= Bookmill =

Coordinates: 42.537833°N 72.537274°W

The Bookmill
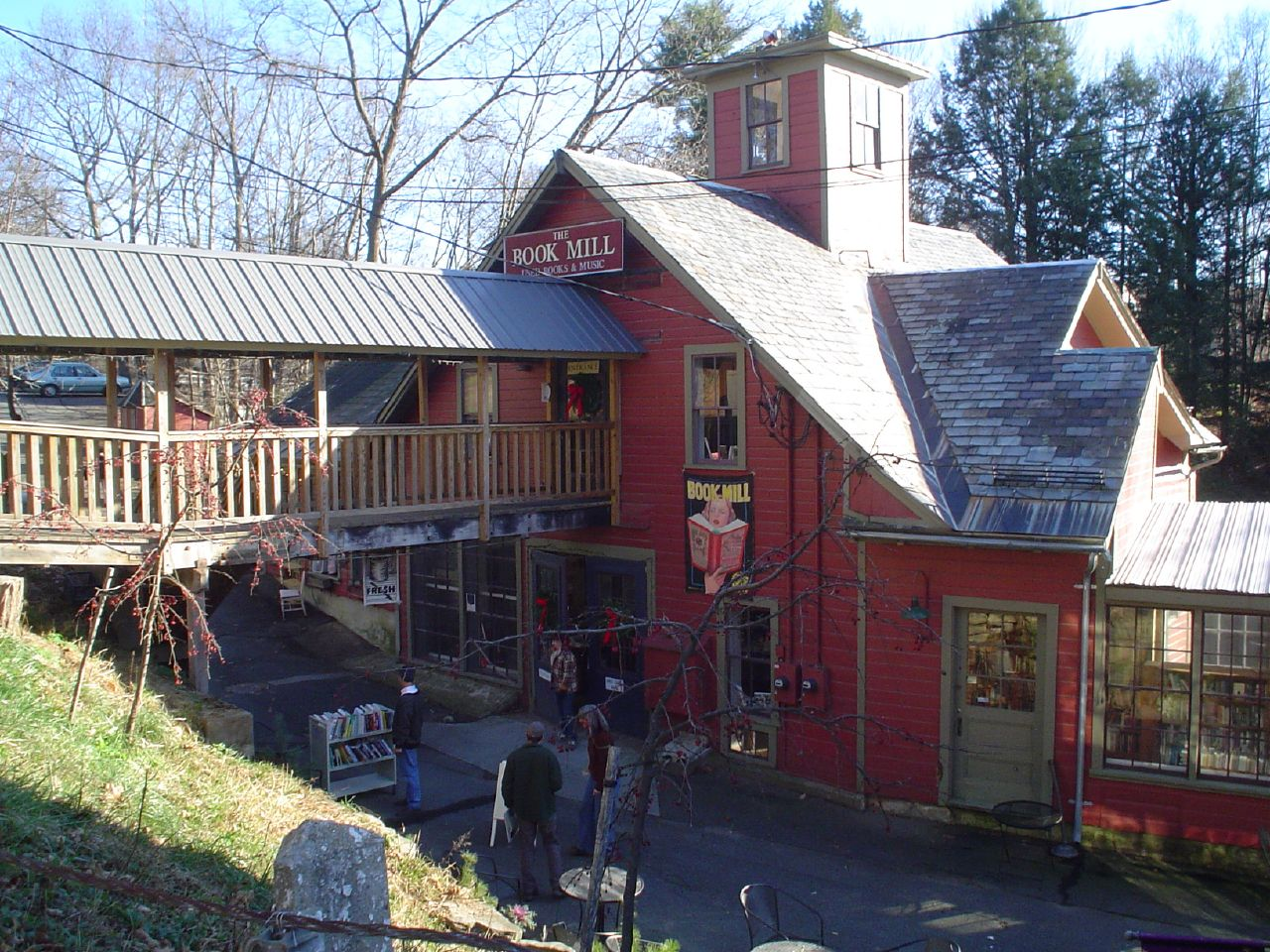
- Type: Private
- Founder: Jim Murphy/ Allan Ross
- Headquarters: Montague, Massachusetts, U.S.
- Products: Books
- Website: Official website

- Alvah Stone Mill
- U.S. National Register of Historic Places
- U.S. Historic district
- U.S. Historic district – Contributing property
- Location within Massachusetts Location within the United States
- Location: Montague, Massachusetts
- Built: 1834
- Architectural style: Greek Revival
- Part of: Montague Center Historic District (ID01001236)
- NRHP reference No.: 97000562

Significant dates
- Added to NRHP: June 30, 1997
- Designated CP: November 16, 2001

The Bookmill (sometimes Book Mill) is an independent bookstore in Montague, Massachusetts. The 1834 grist mill it occupies is listed as the Alvah Stone Mill on the National Register of Historic Places.

The store's motto is "Books you don't need in a place you can't find," and it claims to have "40,000 books and one waterfall." Housed in a 19th-century former gristmill, The Boston Globe called it "a magnet for bibliophiles from the nearby Amherst-Northampton Five College area". In 2005, the Globe devoted an entire article to the bookstore, quoting the owner as saying, "We're not particularly convenient, we're not particularly efficient, but we're beautiful."

The New York Times has described The Bookmill as "the valley's most pristine ambiance for just plain readers" and praised "the Book Mill's cafe, where the baked offerings are superior, as is the view of the rushing waters and the evergreens on the opposite bank, sharply edged against the snow."

Comedian John Hodgman frequents the Bookmill. In a 2013 interview Hodgman claimed "...most dear to my heart The Book Mill and Lady Killigrew in Montague. That's a used bookstore and great cafe where I would spend every hour of every day even if they didn't have Wi-Fi, and they do."

== Building history ==
The Bookmill is located at one of the oldest sites in Montague with an industrial history, and is first identified as a mill site in a 1764 map. The central portion of the current building dates to 1834, when the then-standing mill, a grist mill, was rebuilt to also perform the carding and fulling of wool. The foundation of this portion, which houses traces of the old water power works, is of 18th century origin. In 1934, the mill was converted into a machine shop by the Martin Machine Company, which operated here into the 1980s.

In 1987 Jim Murphy and Allen Ross purchased the property and turned it into the bookmill. They built a deck overlooking the Sawmill River. In the building with The Montague Bookmill were restaurants, including The Blue Heron, and other specialty stores and cafes throughout the years, including The Sawmill River Arts Gallery which is a collective of fifteen local artists and celebrating its 15th year in 2025.

David Lovelace and John Petrovato bought the bookmill property in 1992 and it changed hands again in 1999, when Mark Beaubien took ownership.

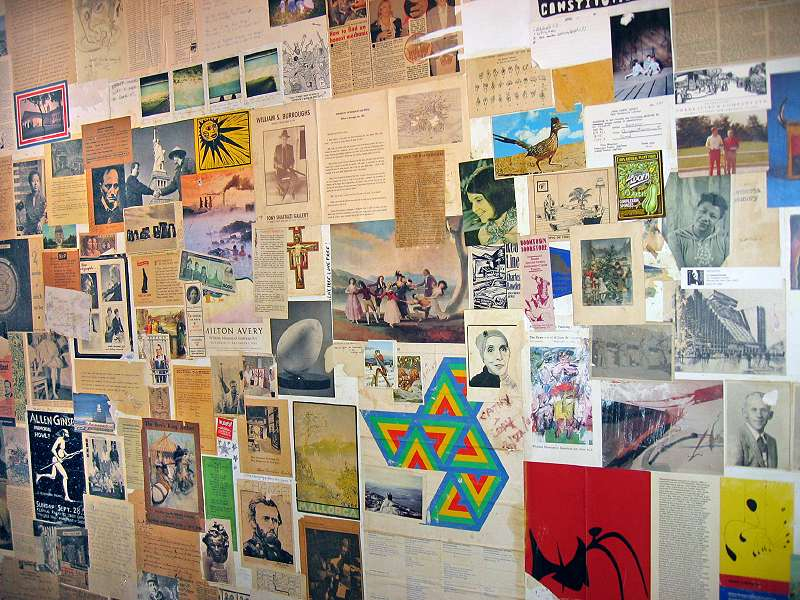
"Of the many quirks in the Montague Bookmill, a bookstore and cafe just outside Amherst and Northampton, perhaps the most serendipitous are on its bathroom walls."—The Boston Globe, 2005

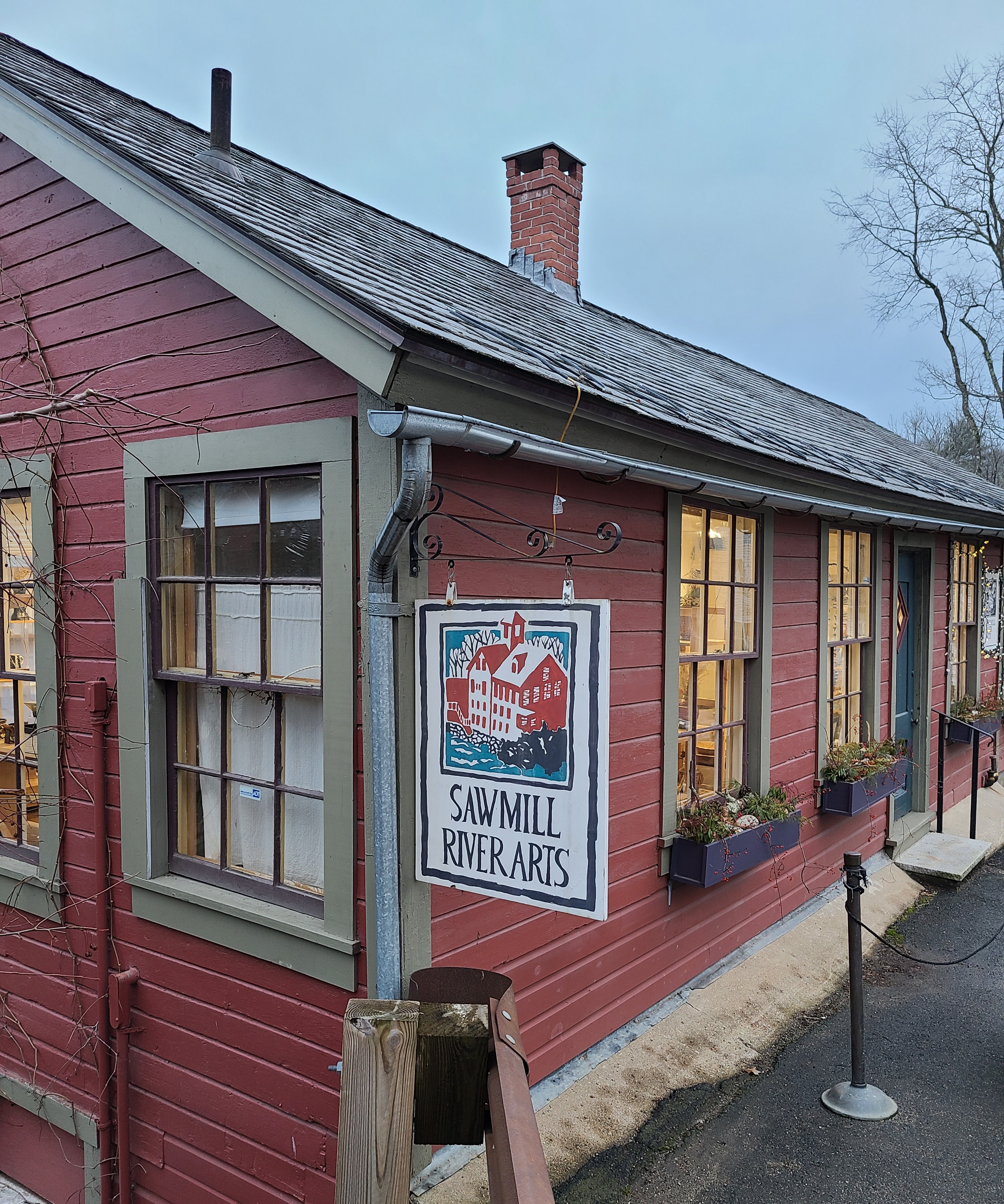
Sawmill River Arts beside the Bookmill

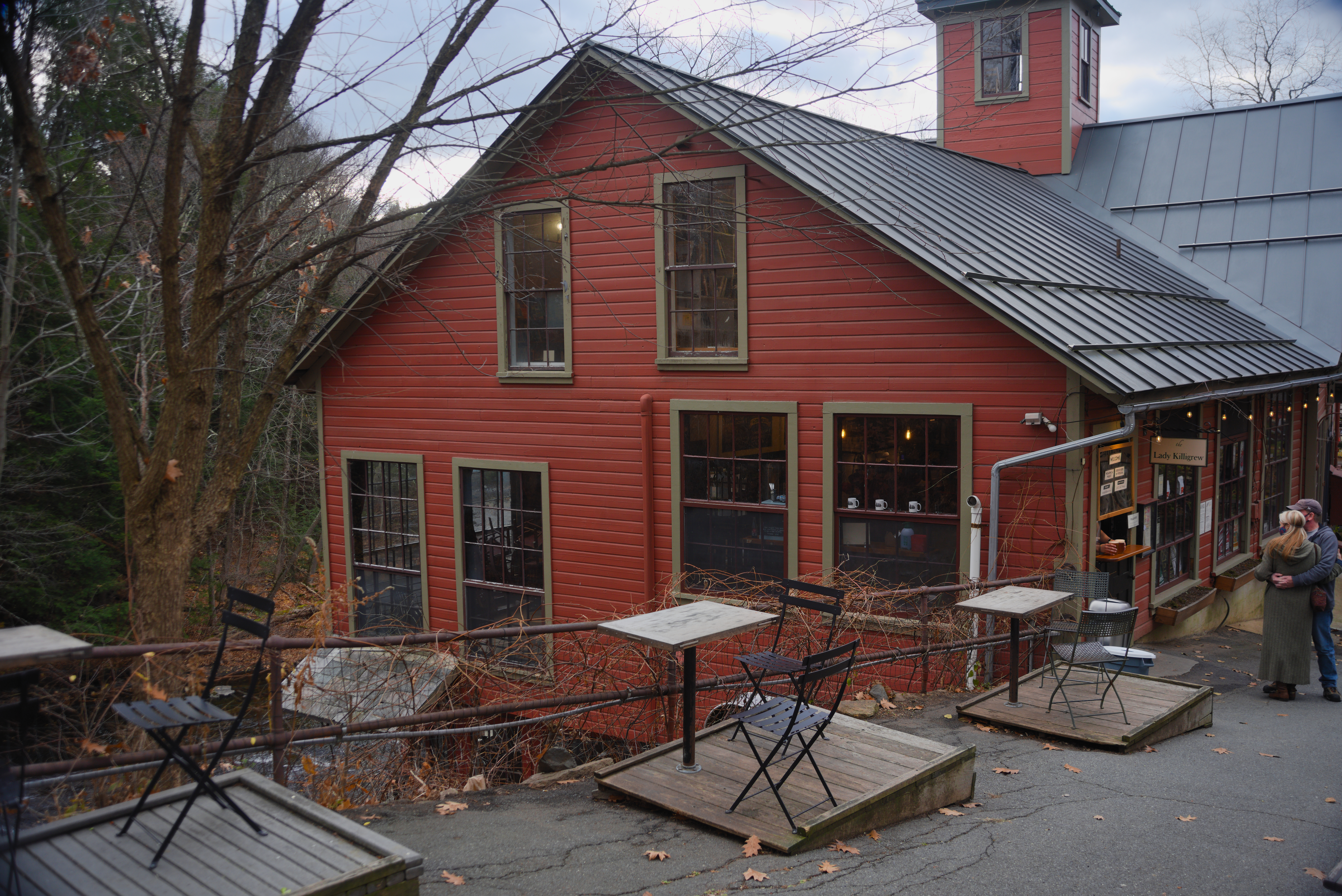
Bookmill and adjacent sandwich shop

== See also ==
- National Register of Historic Places listings in Franklin County, Massachusetts
