= Montague, Massachusetts =

- Town
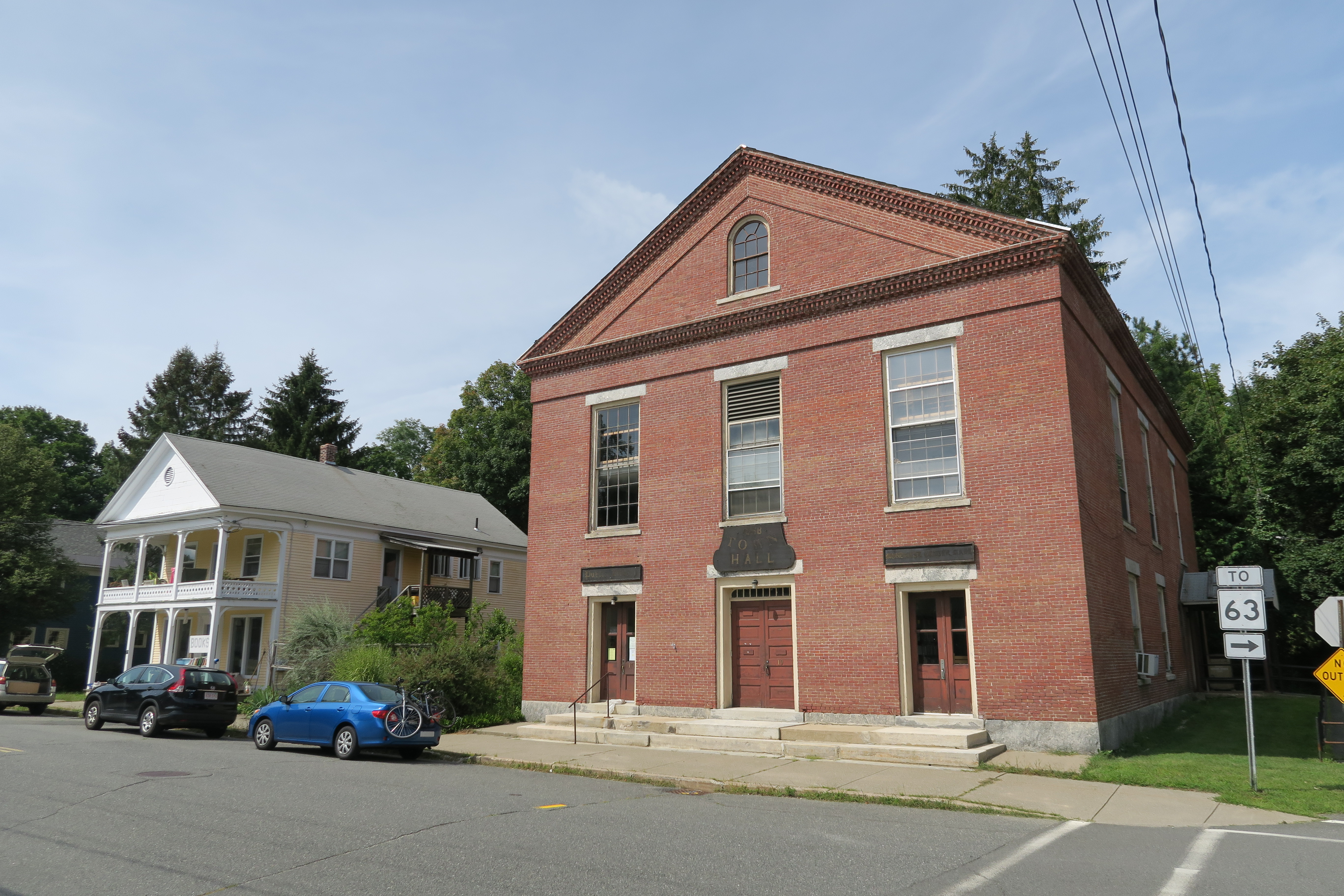
- Old Town Hall

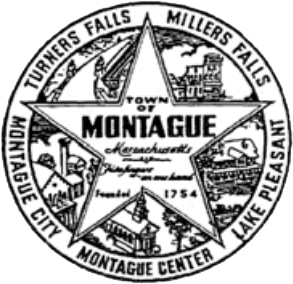
- Seal
- Motto: Five fingers on one hand
- Location in Franklin County in Massachusetts
- Coordinates: 42°32′08″N 72°32′08″W
- Country: United States
- State: Massachusetts
- County: Franklin
- Settled: 1715
- Incorporated: 1754

Government
  - Type: Representative town meeting

Area
  - Total: 31.5 sq mi (81.5 km^{2})
  - Land: 30.2 sq mi (78.1 km^{2})
  - Water: 1.3 sq mi (3.4 km^{2})
- Elevation: 259 ft (79 m)

Population (2020)
  - Total: 8,580
  - Density: 285/sq mi (110/km^{2})
- Time zone: UTC-5 (Eastern)
  - Summer (DST): UTC-4 (Eastern)
- ZIP Codes: 01347 (Lake Pleasant); 01349 (Millers Falls); 01351 (Montague); 01376 (Turners Falls)
- Area code: 413
- FIPS code: 25-42285
- GNIS feature ID: 0618171
- Website: www.montague-ma.gov

Montague is a town in Franklin County, Massachusetts, United States. The population was 8,580 at the 2020 census. It is part of the Springfield, Massachusetts metropolitan statistical area.

The villages of Montague Center, Montague City, Lake Pleasant, Millers Falls (which it shares with Erving), and Turners Falls are located in the town of Montague; Turners Falls, comprising over half the population of the town and its main business district, is sometimes used as a metonym for the entire town of Montague.

== History ==
Originally inhabited by the Pocomtuc tribe, the area was known as Peskeompskut. Montague was first settled by Europeans in 1715 and was incorporated in 1754. The town has five villages within it: Montague Center, Montague City, Turners Falls, Millers Falls, and Lake Pleasant. Montague Center was the original European settlement and was originally a part of the town of Sunderland. Lake Pleasant was a prominent spiritualist campground. Turners Falls was a planned mill community (similar to but less successful than that at Lowell, Massachusetts) that developed when the canal was converted to use for power production rather than transportation in the mid-19th century. Between 1974 and 1980, the Montague Nuclear Power Plant was proposed for construction in the town. In October 2010, the village of Turners Falls hosted the 1st annual Franklin County Pumpkinfest, now known as The Great Falls Festival.

Musician Tiny Tim suffered a heart attack on stage on September 28, 1996, at what was then the Montague Grange Hall; his health never recovered and he died on November 30, 1996, in Minnesota.

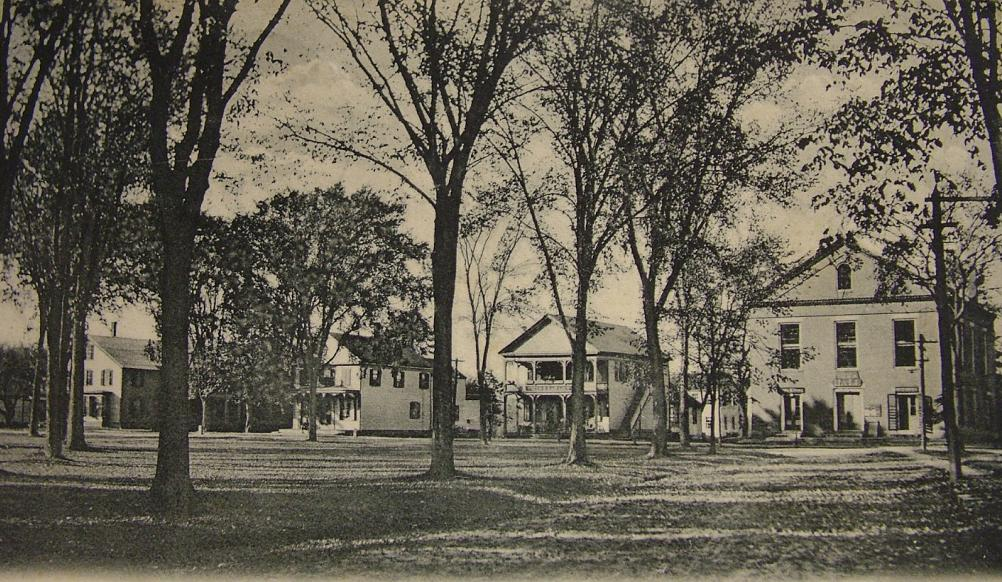
Montague Center in 1907

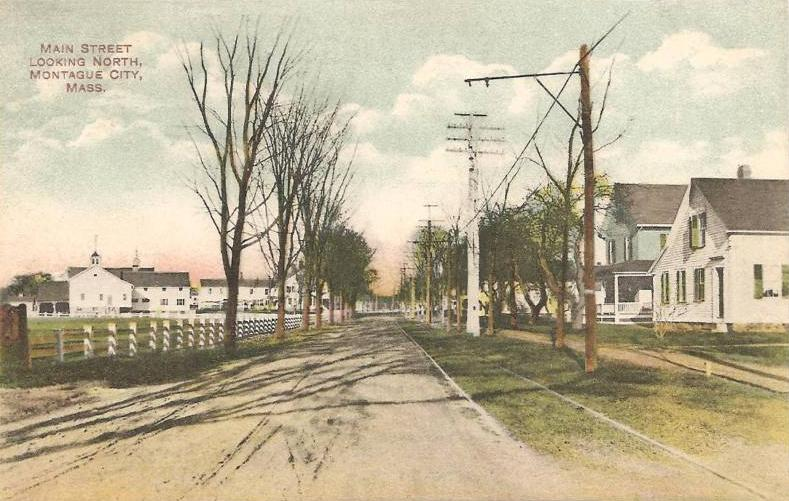
Montague City in 1907

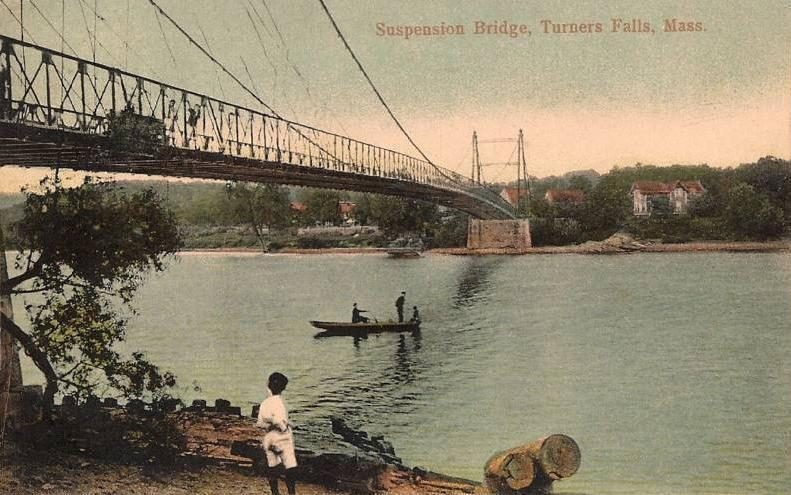
Old Red Bridge in 1907

== Geography ==
According to the United States Census Bureau, the town has a total area of 31.5 square miles (81.5 km^{2}), of which 30.2 square miles (78.1 km^{2}) is land and 1.3 square miles (3.4 km^{2}), or 4.14%, is water. Bounded on the west by the Connecticut River, Montague is drained by the Millers River.

The town is served by state routes 2, 47 and 63.

== Demographics ==
Historical population
Year	Pop.	±%
1790	906	—
1840	1,288	+42.2%
1850	1,518	+17.9%
1860	1,593	+4.9%
1870	2,224	+39.6%
1880	4,875	+119.2%
1890	6,296	+29.1%
1900	6,150	−2.3%
1910	6,866	+11.6%
1920	7,675	+11.8%
1930	8,081	+5.3%
1940	7,582	−6.2%
1950	7,812	+3.0%
1960	7,836	+0.3%
1970	8,451	+7.8%
1980	8,011	−5.2%
1990	8,316	+3.8%
2000	8,489	+2.1%
2010	8,437	−0.6%
2020	8,580	+1.7%
2022	8,463	−1.4%
Source: United States census records and Population Estimates Program data.

As of the census of 2000, there were 8,489 people, 3,616 households, and 2,169 families residing in the town. The population density was 279.2 inhabitants per square mile (107.8/km^{2}). There were 3,844 housing units at an average density of 126.4 per square mile (48.8/km^{2}). The racial makeup of the town was 95.13% White, 0.84% African American, 0.39% Native American, 0.93% Asian, 0.11% Pacific Islander, 0.68% from other races, and 1.92% from two or more races. Hispanic or Latino of any race were 2.56% of the population.

There were 3,616 households, out of which 28.7% had children under the age of 18 living with them, 42.9% were married couples living together, 12.4% had a female householder with no husband present, and 40.0% were non-families. 31.9% of all households were made up of individuals, and 13.5% had someone living alone who was 65 years of age or older. The average household size was 2.31 and the average family size was 2.90.

In the town, the population was spread out, with 23.0% under the age of 18, 7.8% from 18 to 24, 29.3% from 25 to 44, 23.4% from 45 to 64, and 16.5% who were 65 years of age or older. The median age was 39 years. For every 100 females, there were 90.4 males. For every 100 females age 18 and over, there were 88.6 males.

The median income for a household in the town was $33,750, and the median income for a family was $43,194. Males had a median income of $33,705 versus $27,303 for females. The per capita income for the town was $17,794. About 9.1% of families and 13.1% of the population were below the poverty line, including 17.5% of those under age 18 and 10.1% of those age 65 or over.

== Education ==
Montague is home to two public elementary schools. The Hillcrest Elementary School serves K–1, and the Sheffield Elementary School serves 2–5. Middle School students attend Great Falls Middle School, and high school students attend Turners Falls High School.

== Notable people ==
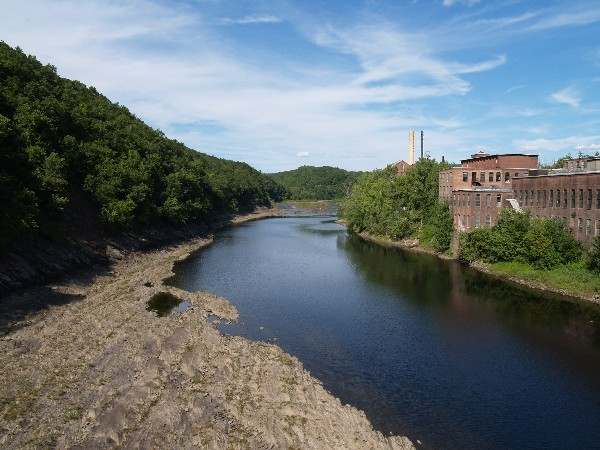
Connecticut River at Turners Falls

- Christopher Baldwin, illustrator and author
- Robert E. Bourdeau, astrophysicist and Explorer 8 Project Manager
- Rico Brogna, first baseman for five teams over a nine-year career
- Eric Chester, author, activist and professor
- Cornelia Clapp, zoologist
- Philip H. Hoff, governor of Vermont
- Samuel L. Montague, politician
- Isaac Morley, religious leader
- George Van Horn Moseley, Jr., colonel, United States Army
- Amán Rawson, American-Argentine medical doctor and father of Argentine Interior Minister Guillermo Rawson
- Janice Raymond
- Charles Boudinot Root, silversmith and businessman
- Sidney Root, businessman
- Luther Severance, congressman
- Doug Smith, relief pitcher
- Tommy "Foghorn" Tucker, third all-time in being hit-by-pitch in major league baseball

== See also ==
- Bookmill
- Canalside Rail Trail
- Canalside Rail Trail Bridge
- General Pierce Bridge
- Montague Center Historic District
- Turners Falls Road Bridge
