= Vermont Route 63 =

State highway in Washington County, Vermont, US

Vermont Route 63
- VT 63 highlighted in red

Route information
- Maintained by VTrans
- Length: 3.901 mi (6.278 km)

Major junctions
- West end: I-89 in Berlin
- East end: VT 14 in Barre

Location
- Country: United States
- State: Vermont
- Counties: Washington

Highway system
- State highways in Vermont
← VT 62	→ VT 64

Vermont Route 63 (VT 63) is a short 3.901-mile-long (6.278 km) state highway in Washington County, Vermont, United States. It connects Interstate 89 (I-89) in Berlin to VT 14 south of the city of Barre.

== Route description ==
VT 63 begins as an offshoot of Interstate 89 at exit 6 in Berlin. It generally parallels VT 62, which lies about 2.5 miles (4.0 km) north and travels into the center of the city of Barre. VT 63 stays to the south, running mostly due east for about 3 miles (4.8 km) before terminating at an intersection with VT 14 in South Barre, a census-designated place within the town of Barre. VT 63 mainly functions as an alternate route to VT 62, providing access to Barre while avoiding the Edward F. Knapp State Airport and the Berlin Mall area to the north.

== Major intersections ==
The entire route is in Washington County.

Location	mi	km	Destinations	Notes
Berlin	0.000	0.000	I-89 – White River Junction, Montpelier, Burlington	Western terminus; exit 6 on I-89; trumpet interchange
Town of Barre	3.901	6.278	VT 14 (South Barre Road) to US 302 – Barre	Eastern terminus; Census-designated place of South Barre
1.000 mi = 1.609 km; 1.000 km = 0.621 mi
