= Vermont Route 12 =

North-south state highway in Vermont, US

Vermont Route 12
- VT 12 highlighted in red, VT 12A in blue

Route information
- Maintained by VTrans
- Length: 101.627 mi (163.553 km)
- Existed: 1922–present

Major junctions
- South end: NH 12 in Weathersfield
- I-91 in Hartland; US 4 in Woodstock; US 2 in Montpelier
- North end: VT 15A at Morrisville

Location
- Country: United States
- State: Vermont
- Counties: Windsor, Orange, Washington, Lamoille

Highway system
- State highways in Vermont
← VT 11	→ VT 14
← Route 11	N.E.	→ Route 13

Vermont Route 12 (VT 12) is a 101.627-mile-long (163.553 km) north-south state highway in Vermont that runs from Weathersfield to Morrisville.

Route 12 is one of the Vermont roads on which moose are most often encountered. They are common from Worcester to Elmore.

== Route description ==
Route 12 begins at the New Hampshire state line on the Connecticut River in the town of Weathersfield. It continues north along the west bank of the Connecticut River, overlapped with U.S. Route 5, until Hartland. It then heads northwest to Woodstock and then north through Montpelier to end at Vermont Route 15A in Morrisville. Vermont Route 12 runs parallel to Interstate 89 from the Woodstock/Hartford vicinity to Montpelier.

== Major intersections ==
County	Location	mi	km	Destinations	Notes
Windsor	Weathersfield	0.000	0.000	NH 12 south – Claremont, Keene	Continuation from New Hampshire
Windsor	Weathersfield	0.394	0.634	VT 131 west to I-91 – Cavendish, Ludlow US 5 south	Southern end of concurrency with US 5
Windsor	Weathersfield	1.544	2.485	VT 44A north – Brownsville	Southern terminus of VT 44A
Windsor	Windsor	5.412	8.710	VT 44 west – Brownsville	Eastern terminus of VT 44
Windsor	Hartland	9.459	15.223	I-91 – White River Junction, Ascutney, Springfield	Exit 9 on I-91; diamond interchange
Windsor	Hartland	10.498	16.895	US 5 north – White River Junction	Northern end of concurrency with US 5
Windsor	Hartland	18.203	29.295	US 4 east – Quechee, White River Junction	Southern end of concurrency with US 4
Windsor	Woodstock	22.085	35.542	US 4 west to VT 106 south	Northern end of concurrency with US 4
Windsor	Bethel	38.474	61.918	VT 107 west – Rutland	Southern end of concurrency with VT 107
Windsor	Bethel	40.340	64.921	VT 107 east to I-89	Northern end of concurrency with VT 107
Orange	Randolph	48.413	77.913	VT 12A north – Roxbury	Southern terminus of VT 12A
Orange	Randolph	48.528	78.098	VT 66 east to I-89	Western terminus of VT 66
Orange	Brookfield	58.932	94.842	VT 65 east – Brookfield, Floating Bridge	Western terminus of VT 65
Washington	Northfield	63.333	101.925	VT 64 east to I-89 – Williamstown	Western terminus of VT 64
Washington	Northfield	64.457	103.733	VT 12A south – Roxbury	Northern terminus of VT 12A
Washington	Montpelier	75.226	121.065	US 2 Bus. US 2 west (Memorial Dr.) to I-89 US 2 east (Berlin St.) to US 302 – East Montpelier, St. Johnsbury	Southern end of concurrency with US 2 Bus.; eastern terminus of US 2 Bus.
Washington	Montpelier	75.430	121.393	US 2 Bus. west	Northern end of concurrency with US 2 Bus.
Lamoille	Morristown	101.627	163.553	VT 15A – Hardwick	Northern terminus
1.000 mi = 1.609 km; 1.000 km = 0.621 mi: Concurrency terminus

== Vermont Route 12A ==
Vermont Route 12A
- Location: Randolph–Northfield
- Length: 20.842 mi (33.542 km)

Vermont Route 12A is a state highway in central Vermont, United States. It provides an alternate route to VT 12 between Randolph and Northfield, via Braintree, Granville and Roxbury.

The road currently used by Vermont Route 12A was originally designated New England Interstate Route 12A as part of the New England Interstate Route System and existed as such until it was replaced by a different system in 1926.

=== Major intersections ===
County	Location	mi	km	Destinations	Notes
Orange	Randolph	0.000	0.000	VT 12 to I-89 – Northfield, Bethel, Rutland	Southern terminus
Addison	No major junctions				
Washington	Roxbury	14.854	23.905	Warren Mountain Road	To VT 100 – Warren
Washington	Northfield	20.842	33.542	VT 12 – Northfield, Montpelier, Barre	Northern terminus
1.000 mi = 1.609 km; 1.000 km = 0.621 mi

== See also ==
- Vermont Route 14 - The northernmost section used to be New England Route 12B
