= Vermont Route 66 =

State highway in Orange County, Vermont, US

Vermont Route 66
- VT 66 highlighted in red

Route information
- Maintained by VTrans
- Length: 7.621 mi (12.265 km)

Major junctions
- West end: VT 12 in Randolph
- I-89 in Randolph
- East end: VT 14 in Randolph

Location
- Country: United States
- State: Vermont
- Counties: Orange

Highway system
- State highways in Vermont
← VT 65	→ VT 67

Vermont Route 66 (VT 66) is a short 7.621-mile-long (12.265 km) state highway located entirely within the town of Randolph in Orange County, Vermont, United States. It serves as a connection between the center and east side of the town.

Vermont Technical College is located near the midpoint of Route 66, about a mile east of its interchange with Interstate 89 (I-89).

== Route description ==
Route 66 begins at an intersection with Route 12 in downtown Randolph, near the southern terminus of Route 12A. It runs northeast towards the town center and interchanges with I-89 at Exit 4. Route 66 continues east into Randolph Center, where it passes Vermont Technical College. Route 66 turns to the north and then to the east out of the town center, before cutting to the southeast and ending at Route 14 in East Randolph.

== Major intersections ==
The entire route is in Randolph, Orange County.

mi	km	Destinations	Notes
0.000	0.000	VT 12	Western terminus
2.437– 2.605	3.922– 4.192	I-89 – Barre, White River Junction	Exit 4 on I-89; diamond interchange
7.621	12.265	VT 14 – Williamstown, Barre, Royalton	Eastern terminus
1.000 mi = 1.609 km; 1.000 km = 0.621 mi
