= Vermont Route 65 =

State highway in Orange County, Vermont, US

Vermont Route 65
- VT 65 highlighted in red

Route information
- Maintained by VTrans
- Length: 5.222 mi (8.404 km)

Major junctions
- West end: VT 12 in Brookfield
- East end: VT 14 in Brookfield

Location
- Country: United States
- State: Vermont
- Counties: Orange

Highway system
- State highways in Vermont
← VT 64	→ VT 66

Vermont Route 65 (VT 65) is a 5.222-mile-long (8.404 km) east–west state highway within the town of Brookfield in Orange County, Vermont, United States. The western terminus of the route is at VT 12 in Brookfield. Its eastern terminus is at VT 14 in the village of East Brookfield. VT 65 traverses the Sunset Lake Floating Bridge and provides access to Allis State Park.

== Route description ==
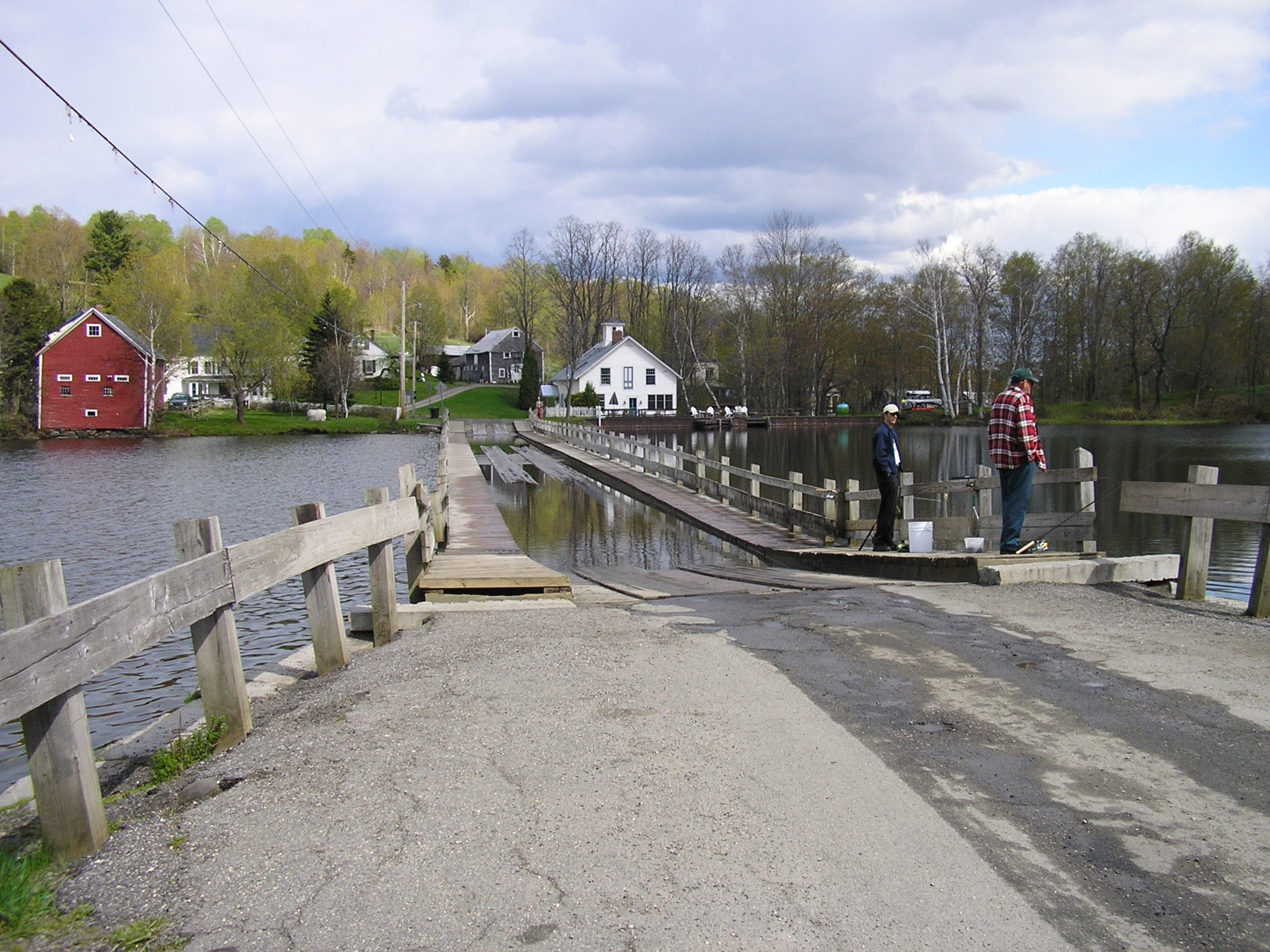
Floating bridge in Brookfield traversed by VT 65

VT 65 begins at an intersection with VT 12 in front of Baker Pond in the town of Brookfield. VT 65 runs east and turns immediately south through dense woods paralleling VT 12. Turning away from VT 12 for a short distance, the route bends southeast, passing a junction with Lamson Pond Road. VT 65 runs southward, reaching a northeastern fork of Allis State Park, intersecting the park access road. At the junction with Bear Hill Road (Township Highway 22), VT 65 turns eastward through a rural section of Vermont, passing the northern shore of South Pond. The route then turns north along West Street, making a quick right off West Street and passing over Interstate 89, but no access to the interstate is provided. VT 65 crosses over a small pond on the Sunset Lake Floating Bridge into downtown Brookfield.

In the section of Brookfield, VT 65 reaches Stone Road, where it turns southeast, passing a junction with Ridge Road. After Ridge Road, the route runs along the southern edges of the ridge, passing some houses and dense woods. After another curve, VT 65 bends northeast and reaches a junction with VT 14 in the village of East Brookfield. This junction marks the eastern terminus of VT 65.

From VT 12 to Brookfield VT 65 is an "improved highway" (i.e. graded gravel road). From Brookfield to VT 14 the highway is paved.

== Major intersections ==
The entire route is in Brookfield, Orange County.

mi	km	Destinations	Notes
0.000	0.000	VT 12 – South Northfield, Northfield, East Braintree, Randolph	Western terminus
5.222	8.404	VT 14 (Main Street) – Williamstown, Barre, North Randolph, Royalton	Eastern terminus
1.000 mi = 1.609 km; 1.000 km = 0.621 mi
