= Vermont Route 64 =

East-west state highway in Vermont, US

Vermont Route 64
- Mill Hill Road
- VT 64 highlighted in red

Route information
- Maintained by VTrans
- Length: 6.770 mi (10.895 km)

Major junctions
- West end: VT 12 in Northfield
- I-89 in Williamstown
- East end: VT 14 in Williamstown

Location
- Country: United States
- State: Vermont
- Counties: Washington, Orange

Highway system
- State highways in Vermont
← VT 63	→ VT 65

Vermont Route 64 (VT 64) is a 6.770-mile-long (10.895 km) state highway in the U.S. state of Vermont. It connects VT 12 in Northfield to VT 14 in Williamstown. Along the way, it intersects Interstate 89 (I-89) in Williamstown.

== Route description ==
VT 64 begins at VT 12 in the town of Northfield. The route proceeds to the east for about 2 miles (3.2 km), crossing into the town of Williamstown, then interchanges with I-89 at Exit 5. VT 64 continues approximately 4 miles (6 km) to the east, ending at an intersection with VT 14 in Williamstown.

== Major intersections ==
County	Location	mi	km	Destinations	Notes
Washington	Northfield	0.000	0.000	VT 12 – East Braintree, Randolph, Northfield, Montpelier	Western terminus
Orange	Williamstown	2.779– 2.967	4.472– 4.775	I-89 – Randolph, White River Junction, Barre, Montpelier	Exit 5 on I-89; diamond interchange
Orange	Williamstown	6.770	10.895	VT 14 (Main Street) – Brookfield, South Barre	Eastern terminus
1.000 mi = 1.609 km; 1.000 km = 0.621 mi
