= Vermont Route 132 =

State highway in eastern Vermont, US

Vermont Route 132
- VT 132 highlighted in red

Route information
- Maintained by VTrans and the Towns of Sharon, Strafford, Thetford, and Norwich
- Length: 16.877 mi (27.161 km)

Major junctions
- West end: VT 14 in Sharon
- I-89 in Sharon
- East end: US 5 in Norwich

Location
- Country: United States
- State: Vermont
- Counties: Windsor, Orange

Highway system
- State highways in Vermont
← VT 131	→ VT 133

Vermont Route 132 (VT 132) is a 16.877-mile-long (27.161 km) state highway in eastern Vermont, United States. It runs east to west from U.S. Route 5 in Norwich to VT 14 (VT 14) in Sharon 300 yards (270 m) from the New Hampshire border in the east. The route interchanges with Interstate 89 (I-89) at exit 2, an interchange situated 300 yards (274 m) from the VT 14 junction. The segment of VT 132 from VT 14 to the ramp from I-89 northbound is maintained by the state; the remainder is town-maintained.

== Route description ==
VT 132 begins at an intersection with VT 14 in the Windsor County town of Sharon. At this junction with VT 14 for the 0.14-mile (0.23 km) long stretch northward, the route is maintained by VTrans. Passing Sharon Elementary School, the route enters an extended diamond interchange with Interstate 89 (exit 2). At the end of this interchange, maintenance changes from VTrans to the town of Sharon. VT 132 continues northeast through the town of Sharon as a two-lane highway, passing residences on the hills overlooking I-89.

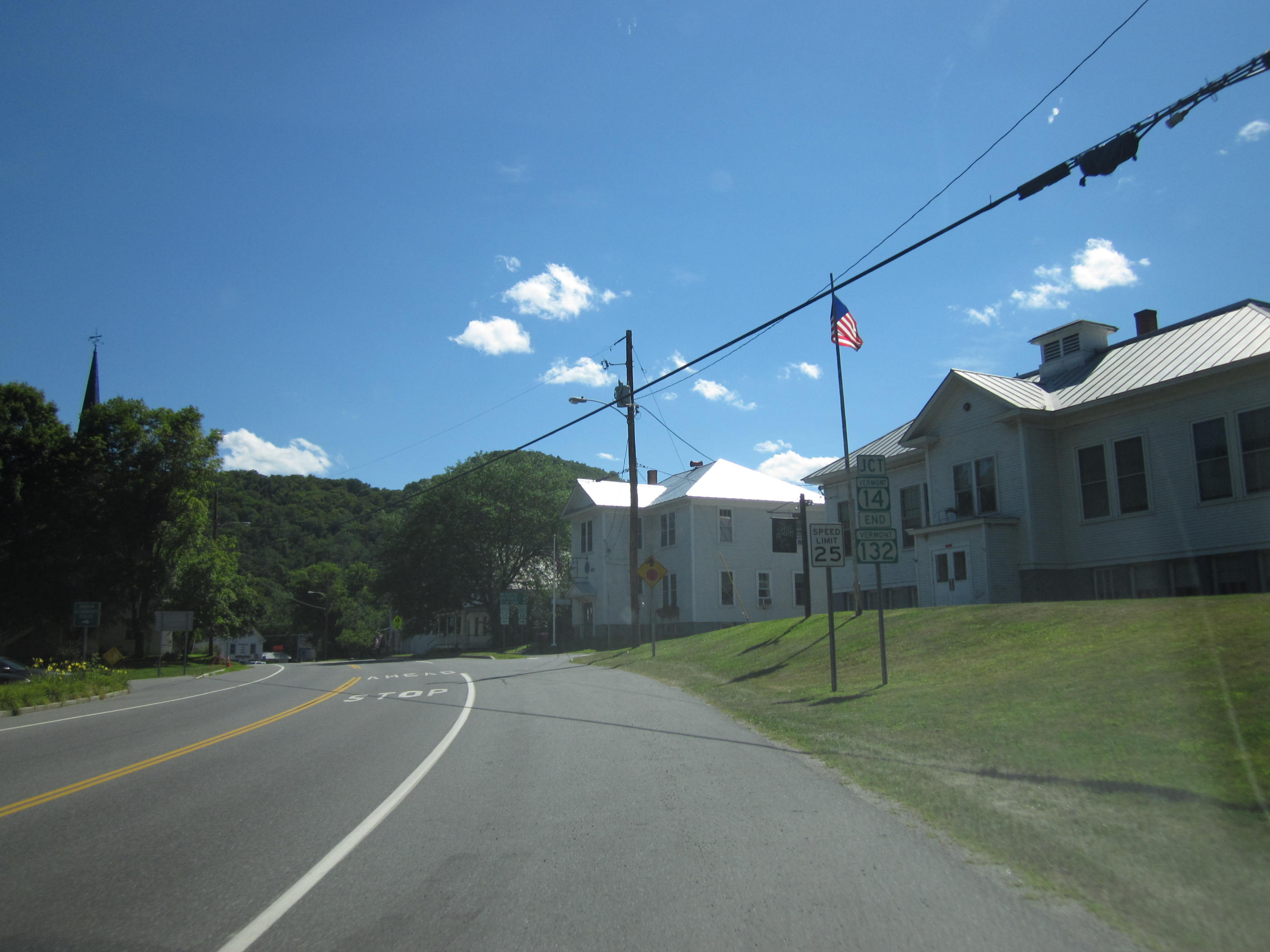
VT 132 southbound approaching VT 14 in Sharon

Soon the route bends further to the northeast, becoming more rural and wooded in nature. Winding northeast, the route soon reaches a junction with Beaver Meadow Road before bending northward into the woods near Maple Ridge Lane. At the junction with Highlake Road, the route goes from north to northeast, passing a junction with Cross Road before crossing the line into Orange County. Crossing through dense woods, the route enters the town of Strafford. Now maintained by the town of Strafford, the route bends northeast out of the woods and past numerous residences on the bottom of a ridge.

Now running eastward, VT 132 bends northeast into the hamlet of South Strafford, intersecting the Justin Morrill Memorial Highway. At this junction, VT 132 turns eastward, becoming the main road through South Strafford. Through South Strafford, the route begins paralleling the west branch of the Ompompanoosuc River and reaching a junction with Mine Road, where it turns north. Crossing and paralleling the river, the route bends east and parallels the waterway into the hamlet of Copper Flat. VT 132 begins running southeast and east through woods in Strafford, crossing into the town of Thetford.

At Miller Pond Road, the route continues winding along the riverside bending southeast into the hamlet of Rices Mills. The main route through Rices Mills, VT 132 runs south through the dense woods nearby the river, which runs east at this point. Turning south, the route soon crosses the Windsor County line, entering the town of Norwich. VT 132 runs south through Union Village, a nearby hamlet before turning southeast at Union Village Road. Paralleling the river, VT 132 remains a two-lane rural road through Norwich, crossing under I-91 with no interchange. After another bend along the Ompompanoosuc River, the route reaches a junction with US 5 near the Connecticut River.

== Major intersections ==
County	Location	mi	km	Destinations	Notes
Windsor	Sharon	0.000	0.000	VT 14 – West Hartford, Hartford, South Royalton	Western terminus
Windsor	Sharon	0.143– 0.212	0.230– 0.341	I-89 – White River Junction, Barre, Bethel	Exit 2 (I-89); diamond interchange
Orange	No major junctions				
Windsor	Norwich	16.877	27.161	US 5 – East Thetford, Norwich	Eastern terminus
1.000 mi = 1.609 km; 1.000 km = 0.621 mi
