= Vermont Route 14 =

North-south state highway in Vermont, US

Vermont Route 14
- VT 14 highlighted in red

Route information
- Maintained by VTrans
- Length: 108.946 mi (175.332 km)
- Existed: 1922–present

Major junctions
- South end: US 4 / US 5 in White River Junction
- US 302 in Barre; US 2 in East Montpelier; US 5 in Coventry
- North end: VT 100 in Newport

Location
- Country: United States
- State: Vermont
- Counties: Windsor, Orange, Washington, Caledonia, Orleans

Highway system
- State highways in Vermont
← VT 12A	→ VT 15
← Route 13	N.E.	→ Route 15

Vermont Route 14 (VT 14) is a 108.946-mile-long (175.332 km) north–south state highway in northeastern Vermont, United States. It extends from U.S. Route 4 (US 4) and US 5 in White River Junction to VT 100 in Newport. Between White River Junction and the city of Barre, the route parallels Interstate 89 (I-89). VT 14 was originally designated in 1922 as part of the New England road marking system. Its north end was truncated in 1926 as a result of the designation of US 2 but was extended north along an old alignment of VT 12 in the 1960s.

== Route description ==
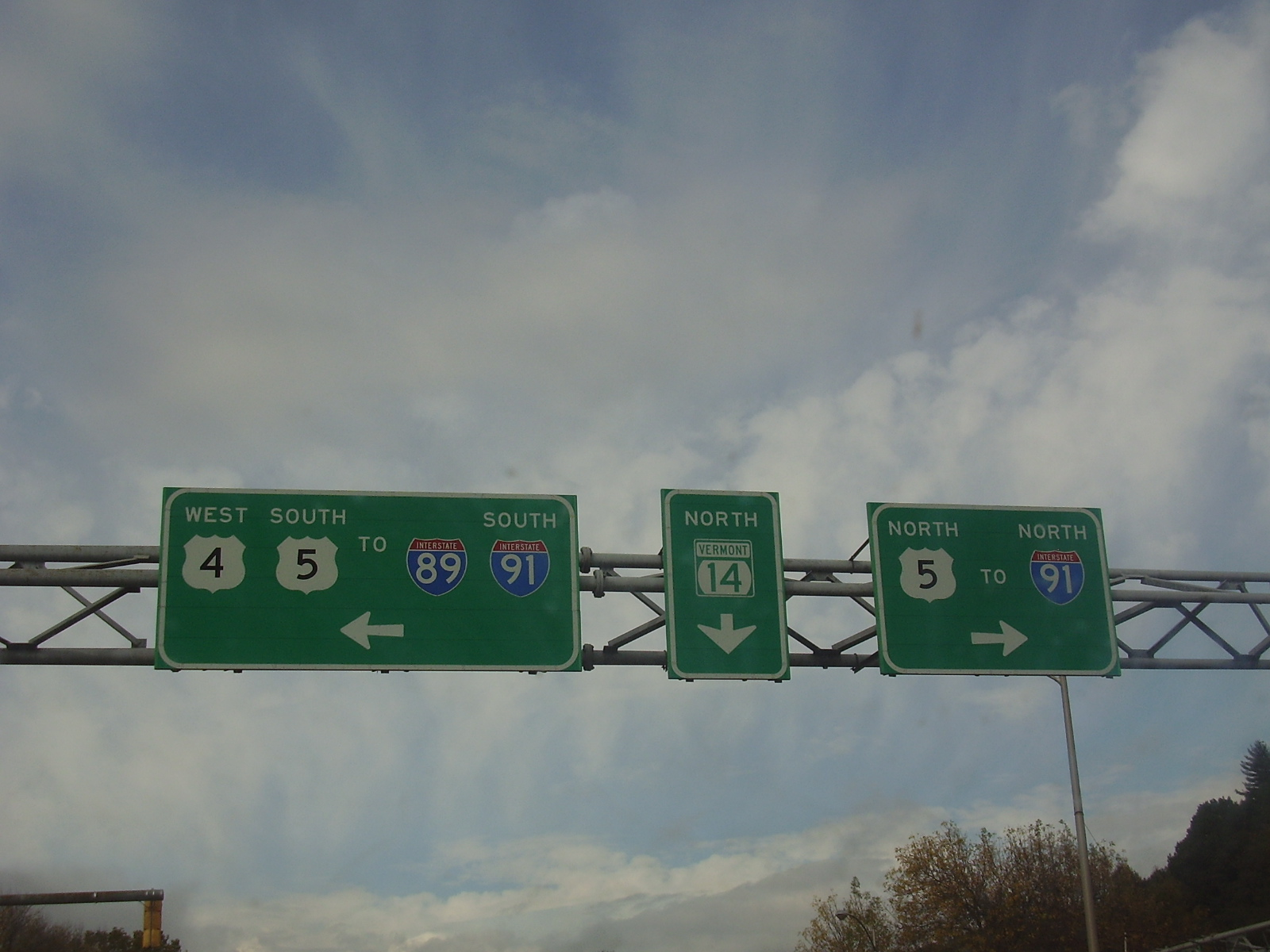
Overhead signage at the southern terminus of VT 14 in White River Junction as viewed from US 4 westbound

=== White River Junction to East Montpelier ===
VT 14 begins at the intersection of US 4 and US 5 in White River Junction in the town of Hartford, at the confluence of the White River and the Connecticut River. VT 14 heads northwest as Maple Street, crossing under I-91 without an interchange, and continues through the town center of Hartford, along the north bank of the White River. 5 miles (8 km) later it passes through the small village of West Hartford and soon enters the town of Sharon. After traveling another 5 miles (8 km) along the river, VT 14 intersects with VT 132 in Sharon center and continues northwest into the town of Royalton, where it passes through the town's three villages along the White River. VT 14 first goes through South Royalton, where it has a junction with VT 110, then continues to follow the winding path of the river through Royalton center, finally reaching the village of North Royalton, where it meets with VT 107. From here, VT 14 turns north, leaving the main White River to follow the Second Branch of the White River. VT 14 runs for about 3 miles (5 km) in western Royalton town, then enters the village of East Bethel in the town of Bethel. Less than 1 mile (1.6 km) later, VT 14 enters the town of Randolph, passing through the village of South Randolph. After traveling north for another 4.5 miles (7.2 km), VT 14 arrives in the village of East Randolph, where it has a junction with VT 66, which is signed for the Randolph town center.

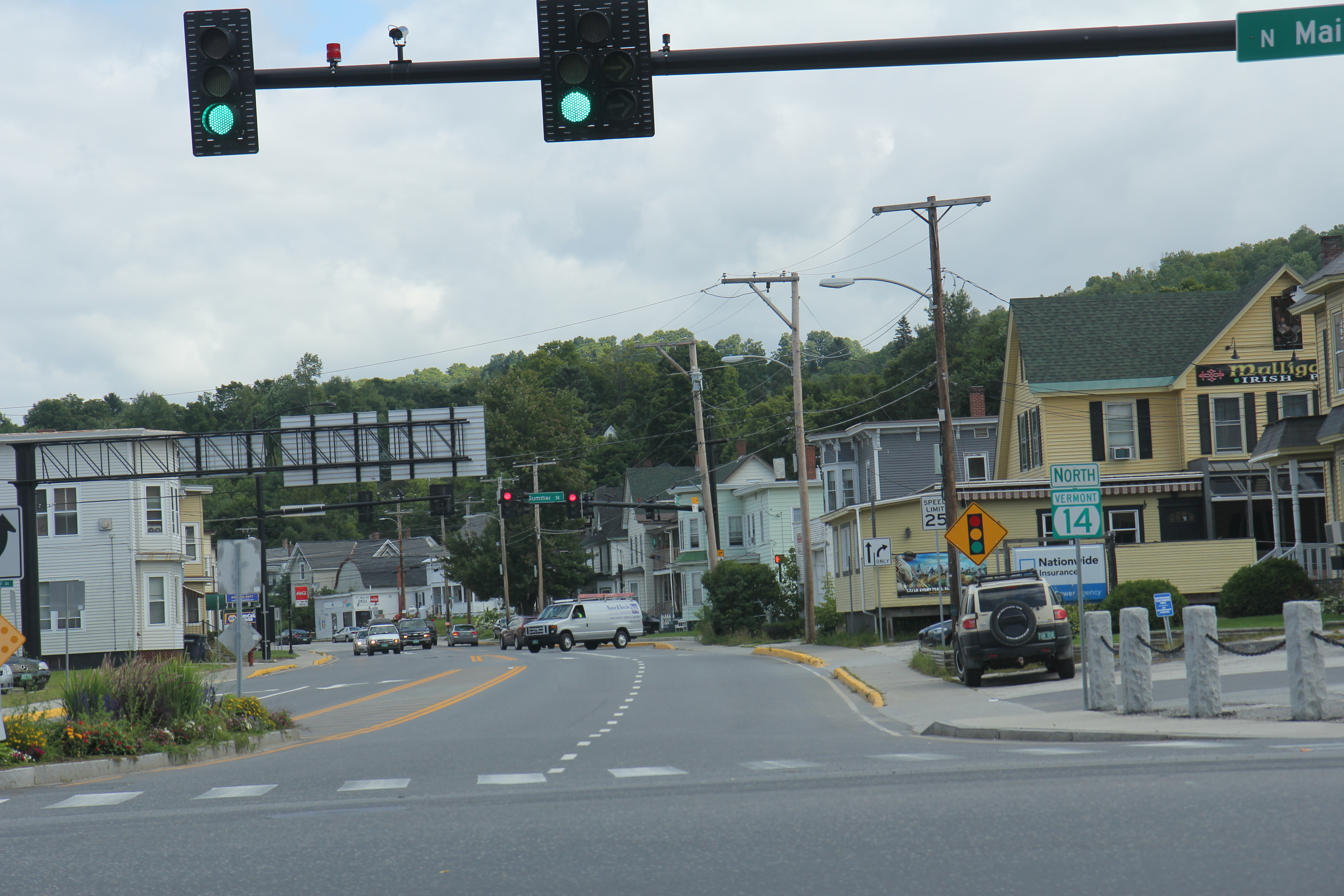
Vermont Route 14 in Barre

VT 14 continues north for another 2 miles (3.2 km) through the village of North Randolph before entering the town of Brookfield. Upon reaching the village of East Brookfield about 3.6 miles (5.8 km) north of the town line, VT 14 intersects with VT 65, the route to Brookfield center. Further north, VT 14 passes by Ainsworth State Park, which straddles the town line between Brookfield and Williamstown and also marks the upstream end of the Second Branch of the White River. VT 14 continues north through the narrow mountain pass of the state park and eventually arrives at the town center of Williamstown, where it intersects VT 64. After another 2.3 miles (3.7 km), VT 14 crosses into the town of Barre. It proceeds through the village of South Barre, intersecting with VT 63, and continuing into the city of Barre. In Barre city, VT 14 runs along South Main Street for 1.2 miles (1.9 km) until the junction with U.S. Route 302. US 302 and VT 14 overlap along North Main Street as they head into the city center. At the city center, the two overlapped routes split at a large four-way intersection that also includes a junction with VT 62, a short connector to I-89. US 302 heads northwest directly towards the city of Montpelier, while VT 14 heads north along Maple Avenue towards the town of East Montpelier. VT 14 briefly re-enters Barre town for about 0.6 miles (1.0 km) before entering the town limits of East Montpelier. After 2.4 miles (3.9 km), VT 14 crosses the Winooski River into the town center, where it meets U.S. Route 2.

=== East Montpelier to Newport ===
After overlapping with US 2 for 0.2 miles (0.32 km) through East Montpelier center, VT 14 continues for 3 miles (5 km) to an intersection with VT 214, in North Montpelier village. It soon enters the town of Calais, running for nearly 7 miles (11 km) through the eastern part of this mostly rural town, including the village of East Calais, plus another 8 miles (13 km) through the next town, Woodbury. Within Woodbury, it passes through the small town center, then continues past Greenwood Lake to run for several miles along the narrow river valley at the eastern edge of the Woodbury Mountains. Upon entering the next town, Hardwick, the valley opens up as the road approaches the town center, where the Lamoille River crosses east to west. Here, northbound VT 14 is joined by westbound VT 15, as they run concurrently to the northwest for about 1 mile (1.6 km), crossing the Lamoille River just north of the town center, after which VT 15 continues west as the two routes separate. VT 14 continues north along the west shore of Hardwick Lake, as the valley the road has been passing through narrows again. After 4 miles (6 km), VT 14 briefly enters the town of Greensboro, where it passes along the shore of Lake Eligo, then continues northwest into the town of Craftsbury. VT 14 bypasses the small villages of the town, running along a more westerly track.

After traveling 8 miles (13 km) through rural Craftsbury, VT 14 proceeds north into the town of Albany, where it runs for another 7 miles (11 km), passing through the village of Albany along the way. North of Albany, VT 14 continues into the town of Irasburg, where it intersects VT 58 at the town center. The two routes overlap to the north and west for 2.1 miles (3.4 km). After another 3.5 miles (5.6 km) in northern Irasburg town, VT 14 enters Coventry, where it is immediately joined by U.S. Route 5 coming from the southeast. The two routes overlap for about 0.5 miles (0.8 km) through Coventry center then separate, with US 5 heading north to the city of Newport and VT 14 heading northwest towards the town of Newport, where it ends at VT 100, less than 0.5 miles (0.8 km) after crossing the town line. VT 100 and VT 105 continue into Newport Center.

== History ==
=== 19th century turnpikes ===
The roads of the southern half of modern VT 14 were improved at the beginning of the 19th century as various privately owned turnpikes. The oldest of these was the White River Turnpike, which was chartered on November 1, 1800. The road was to run 21 miles (34 km) from the mouth of the White River to the point where it was joined by the Second Branch of the White River, and connected the settlements of White River Junction, Sharon, and Royalton. The toll road was in operation for 52 years. By the end of this period, receipts from the road had become very small due to the recent opening in 1850, along the same path as the turnpike, of a new railway line of the Vermont Central Railroad.

Another portion of modern VT 14, between East Brookfield and Williamstown center, was to be improved by another turnpike corporation, the Williamstown Center Turnpike, which was chartered on November 14, 1803. The charter provided that the road be turned over to the state after having been in operation for 25 years (later amended to 40 years). The company, however, did not do anything in its first two years of existence and only began laying out the road in 1805.

A third turnpike corporation, the Randolph Turnpike, was chartered on November 7, 1805, to build a 10-mile (16 km) northward continuation of the White River Turnpike. The road of the Randolph Turnpike was to run from North Royalton to East Randolph. The corporation was dissolved by the state legislature on November 6, 1833.

=== Route designation ===

In 1922, the New England states adopted a region-wide system for route numbering. New England Route 14 was initially designated as a north–south route beginning at White River Junction, through Montpelier, to the city of Burlington. The route used modern VT 14 to Barre, then US 302 to Montpelier, and US 2 to Burlington. By 1925, an extension into New Hampshire had been designated continuing across the Connecticut River to Lebanon, New Hampshire and heading southeast to Franklin, along modern US 4 to Andover and New Hampshire Route 11 to Franklin.

At the end of 1926, the American Association of State Highway Officials formally established the U.S. Highway System and many of the New England inter-state routes were redesignated as U.S. Routes. The portion of New England Route 14 from Barre to Burlington was assigned to U.S. Route 2, while the portion in New Hampshire was assigned to U.S. Route 4. This shortened Route 14 in the south to US 4/US 5 in White River Junction, and in the north to US 2 in the city of Barre. In 1935, the portion of US 2 between Montpelier and St. Johnsbury was relocated to a more northerly alignment using a section of then Vermont Route 18. The old US 2 alignment was redesignated as US 302. VT 14 was extended northward several miles to East Montpelier, ending at the junction of newly relocated US 2 and Vermont Route 12.

On May 1, 1960, the northern half of Vermont Route 12 (north of Montpelier) was relocated to the "Montpelier-Morrisville State Highway", which connected Montpelier with the village of Morrisville. Originally, VT 12 continued north from Montpelier via East Montpelier to Hardwick and Barton, then overlapped with U.S. Route 5 to the city of Newport via Coventry. Between Hardwick and Coventry, VT 12 had an alternate route, Vermont Route 12B, that took a more westerly alignment via Albany. The relocation of the northern half of VT 12 to a new alignment resulted in the redesignation of its original northern alignment. The portion between Hardwick and Barton became a new Vermont Route 16. The portion between East Montpelier and Hardwick was assigned as an extension of VT 14. At the same time, VT 12B was also redesignated as a further northward extension of VT 14, including an additional 4-mile (6.4 km) piece connecting to VT 100 in the town of Newport, resulting in the modern VT 14 alignment.

== Major intersections ==
County	Location	mi	km	Destinations	Notes
Windsor	White River Junction	0.000	0.000	US 4 / US 5 to I-91	Southern terminus
Windsor	Sharon	12.869	20.711	VT 132 east to I-89 – South Strafford, Barre	Western terminus of VT 132
Windsor	Royalton	17.757	28.577	VT 110 north – Tunbridge	Southern terminus of VT 110
Windsor	Royalton	21.286	34.256	VT 107 west to I-89 – Bethel, Randolph	Eastern terminus of VT 107
Orange	Randolph	30.357	48.855	VT 66 west to I-89 – Randolph Center, Randolph	Eastern terminus of VT 66
Orange	Brookfield	36.815	59.248	VT 65 west – Brookfield, Floating Bridge	Eastern terminus of VT 65
Orange	Williamstown	44.327	71.337	VT 64 west to I-89 – Northfield	Eastern terminus of VT 64
Washington	Town of Barre	48.362	77.831	VT 63 west to I-89	Eastern terminus of VT 63
Washington	City of Barre	50.188	80.770	US 302 east (Washington St.)	Southern end of concurrency with US 302
Washington	City of Barre	50.645	81.505	US 302 west (North Main Street) VT 62 to I-89	Northern end of concurrency with US 302; eastern terminus of VT 62
Washington	East Montpelier	55.729	89.687	US 2 west – Montpelier	Southern end of concurrency with US 2
Washington	East Montpelier	55.936	90.020	US 2 east – Plainfield, St. Johnsbury	Northern end of concurrency with US 2
Washington	East Montpelier	59.066	95.058	VT 214 south – Plainfield	Northern terminus of VT 214
Caledonia	Hardwick	75.357	121.275	VT 15 east – Barton, St. Johnsbury	Southern end of concurrency with VT 15
Caledonia	Hardwick	76.495	123.107	VT 15 west – Morrisville	Northern end of concurrency with VT 15
Orleans	Irasburg	100.195	161.248	VT 58 east to I-91 – Orleans	Southern end of concurrency with VT 58
Orleans	Irasburg	101.473	163.305	VT 58 west – Lowell	Northern end of concurrency with VT 58
Orleans	Coventry	105.052	169.065	US 5 south – Orleans, St. Johnsbury	Southern end of concurrency with US 5
Orleans	Coventry	105.596	169.940	US 5 north – Newport	Northern end of concurrency with US 5
Orleans	Town of Newport	108.946	175.332	VT 100 – Troy, Westfield, Jay, North Troy, Newport	Northern terminus
1.000 mi = 1.609 km; 1.000 km = 0.621 mi: Concurrency terminus

== See also ==
- List of state highways in Vermont
