= Interstate 89 =

Interstate in Vermont and New Hampshire

Interstate 89
- I-89 highlighted in red

Route information
- Length: 191.12 mi (307.58 km)
- Existed: August 14, 1957–present
- NHS: Entire route

Major junctions
- South end: I-93 / Everett Turnpike / NH 3A in Bow, NH
- I-91 in White River Junction, VT; I-189 in South Burlington, VT
- North end: R-133 at the Canadian border near Highgate Springs, VT

Location
- Country: United States
- States: New Hampshire, Vermont
- Counties: NH: Merrimack, Sullivan, Grafton; VT: Windsor, Orange, Washington, Chittenden, Franklin

Highway system
- Interstate Highway System; Main; Auxiliary; Suffixed; Business; Future
- New Hampshire Highway System; Interstate; US; State; Turnpikes
- State highways in Vermont
← NH 88	NH	→ I-93
← VT 78	VT	→ I-91

Interstate 89 (I-89) is an Interstate Highway in the New England region of the United States traveling from Bow, New Hampshire, to the Canada–United States border between Highgate Springs, Vermont, and Saint-Armand, Quebec. As with all odd-numbered primary Interstates, I-89 is signed as a north–south highway. However, it follows a primarily northwest-to-southeast path. The route forms a major part of the main connection between the cities of Montreal and Boston. In Quebec, Canada, the route continues as Route 133 for a few kilometers, then Autoroute 35, forming a near-complete limited-access highway route between Boston and Montreal, following I-93 south from I-89's terminus. The largest cities directly served by I-89 are Concord, the state capital of New Hampshire; Montpelier, the state capital of Vermont; and Burlington, Vermont. I-89 is one of three main Interstate highways whose route is located entirely within New England, along with I-91 and I-93 (both of which also have their northernmost pavement in Vermont).

I-89 connects smaller cities and rural areas within New Hampshire and Vermont, and maintains two lanes of traffic in each direction throughout the route. Unlike its neighboring Interstates, it does not intersect any even-numbered Interstates along its route. It does, however, parallel (and intersect multiple times with) portions of three US Routes: US Route 4 (US 4) from Enfield, New Hampshire, to Hartford, Vermont; US 2 from Montpelier to Colchester, Vermont; and US 7 from Burlington to the Canadian border. US 7 and US 2 overlap each other between Burlington and Colchester.

In Chittenden County, Vermont, I-189 begins at exit 13 in South Burlington. The Champlain Parkway, which will be one travel lane in each direction and have at-grade crossings, is being constructed between the current terminus of I-189 at US 7 and Burlington's South End as a link toward downtown Burlington. I-189 is the only auxiliary route of I-89.

== Route description ==
Lengths
	mi	km
NH	60.87	97.96
VT	130.25	209.62
Total	191.12	307.58

=== New Hampshire ===
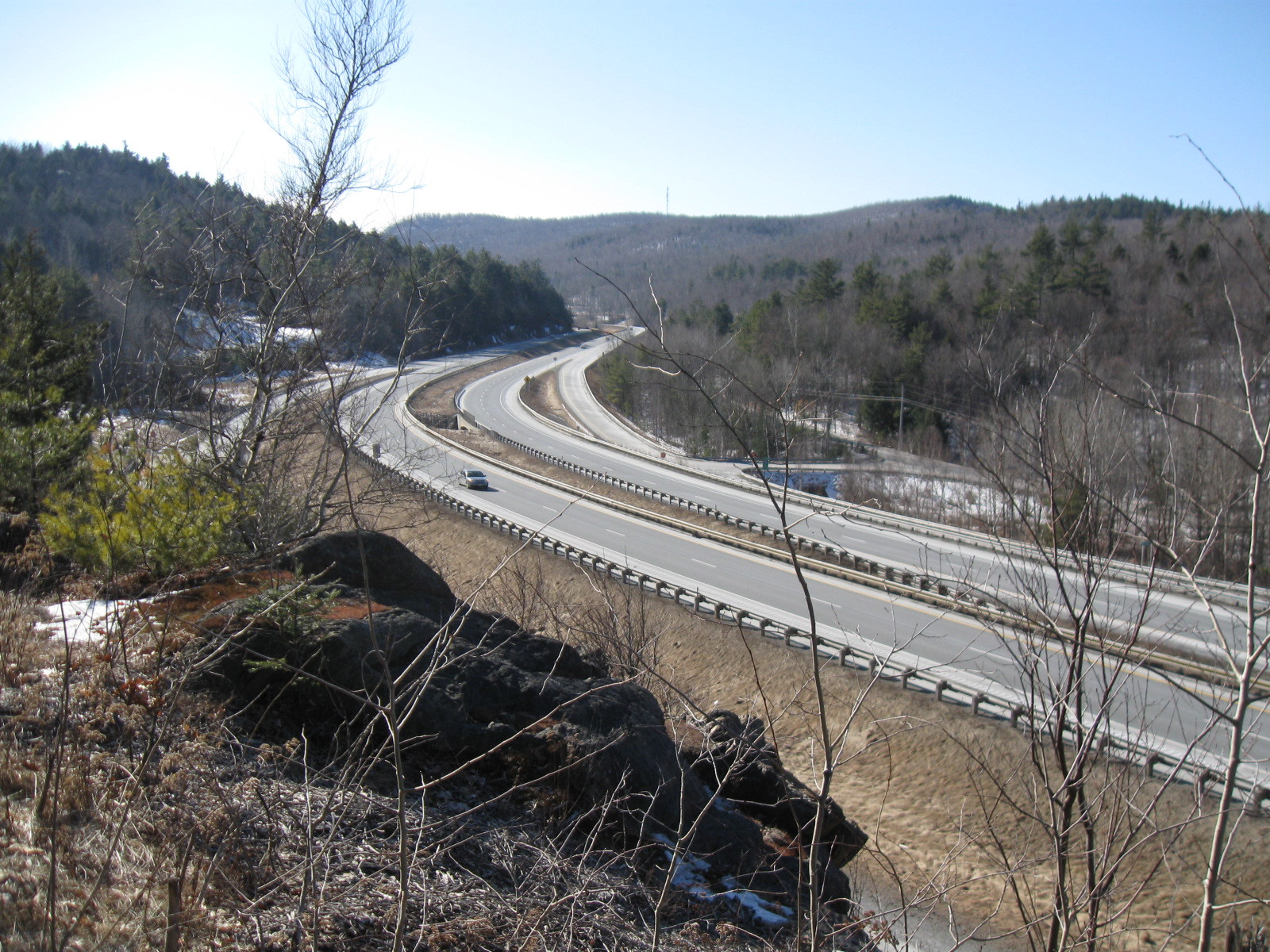
New Hampshire exit 15 (Montcalm), looking south

I-89 runs for about 61 miles (98 km) in the state of New Hampshire and is the major freeway corridor through the western part of the state. Despite being signed as a north–south freeway, its first eight miles (13 km) actually run east–west before shifting to the northwest. The two major population centers along I-89's length in New Hampshire are Concord, at its southern terminus, and Lebanon, on the Vermont state line. Mileage signs along I-89 in each direction consistently list one of the two cities. Also located along I-89 in New Hampshire are the towns of Grantham, New London, and Warner.

Starting at an interchange with I-93 and New Hampshire Route 3A (NH 3A) in the town of Bow, just south of the New Hampshire capital city of Concord, the highway runs a northwest path through the Dartmouth–Lake Sunapee Region. One exit directly serves Concord (exit 2) before the highway enters the neighboring town of Hopkinton. East–west NH 11 joins I-89 at exit 11 and runs concurrently with it for about three miles (4.8 km) before departing at exit 12. At exit 13 in Grantham, NH 10 enters I-89, and the pair of highways form another concurrency, this one for about 15 miles (24 km).

Southeast of Lebanon, signs for exit 15 display the name "Montcalm", while exit 16 directs travelers to "Purmort". Neither place name existed at the time of construction of the Interstate. Exits 15 and 16 were built to access portions of the town of Enfield that were otherwise cut off by the new highway. The names were chosen by Enfield's selectpeople in 1960; the Purmorts were a prominent local family in the early history of Enfield, and Montcalm was a nearby settlement that had once had its own school and post office. While the Purmort exit does allow access to the state road network (specifically to US 4 via Eastman Hill Road), the Montcalm exit provides access to an otherwise isolated community; every public road from the exit is a dead-end, and leaving the Montcalm area by car requires getting back on I-89 at exit 15. However, a bicycle path parallels I-89 between exits 14 and 16 along the path of Old Route 10, allowing foot or bicycle access to the community.

The highway continues northwest, passing through Lebanon, in which the Dartmouth–Hitchcock Medical Center is located. A few miles north of this point is Dartmouth College. US 4 parallels I-89 through Lebanon. Exits 17 through 20 serve the city of Lebanon and are passed in quick succession. At exit 19, northbound NH 10 separates from I-89 and joins westbound US 4 to pass through West Lebanon. The final exit in New Hampshire is exit 20, providing access to West Lebanon's large retail district along NH 12A. Just after this interchange, the highway crosses the Connecticut River and enters Vermont, where it remains for the rest of its run northwest to the Canadian border.

=== Vermont ===
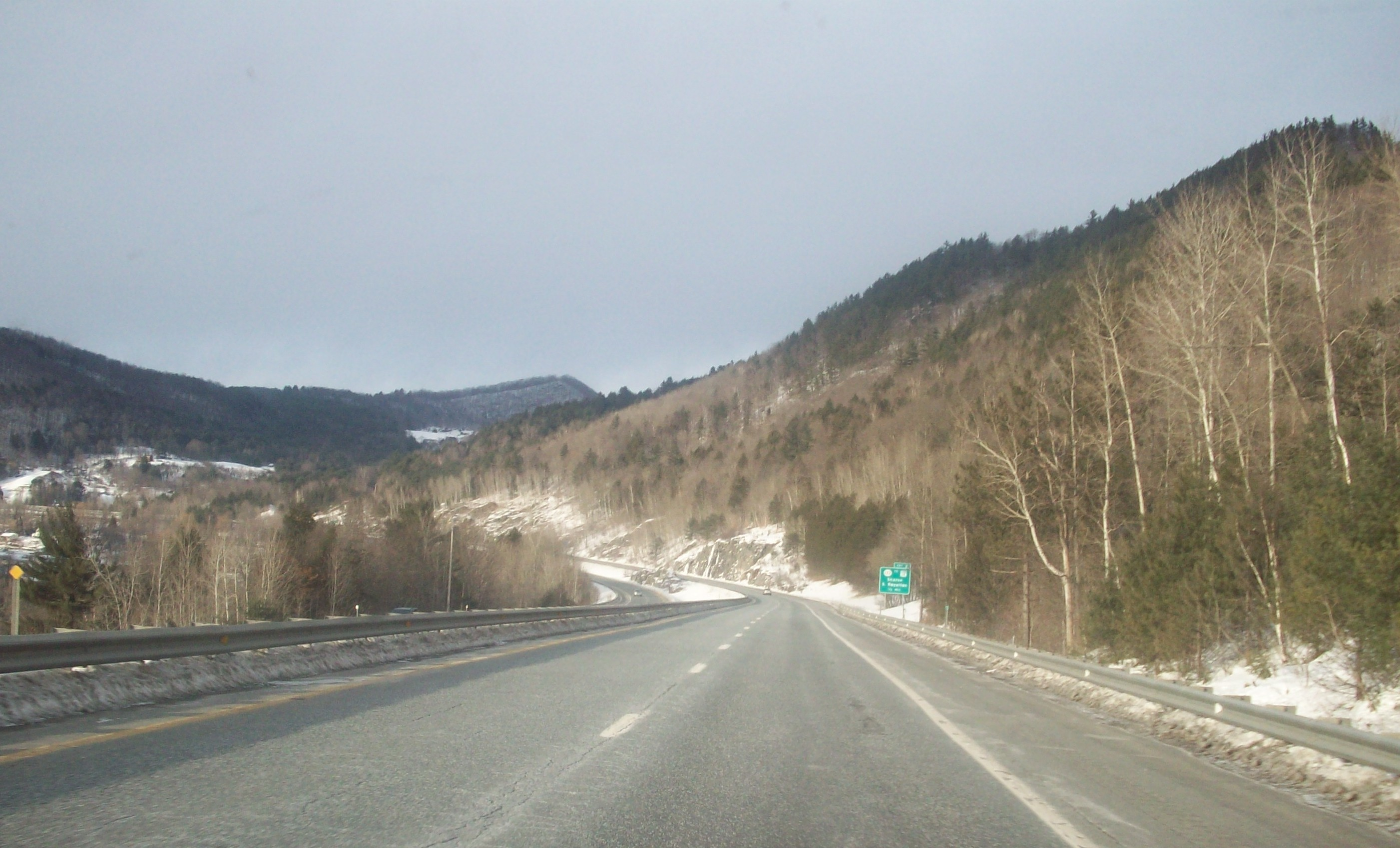
I-89 northbound in Vermont, approaching exit 2 in Sharon

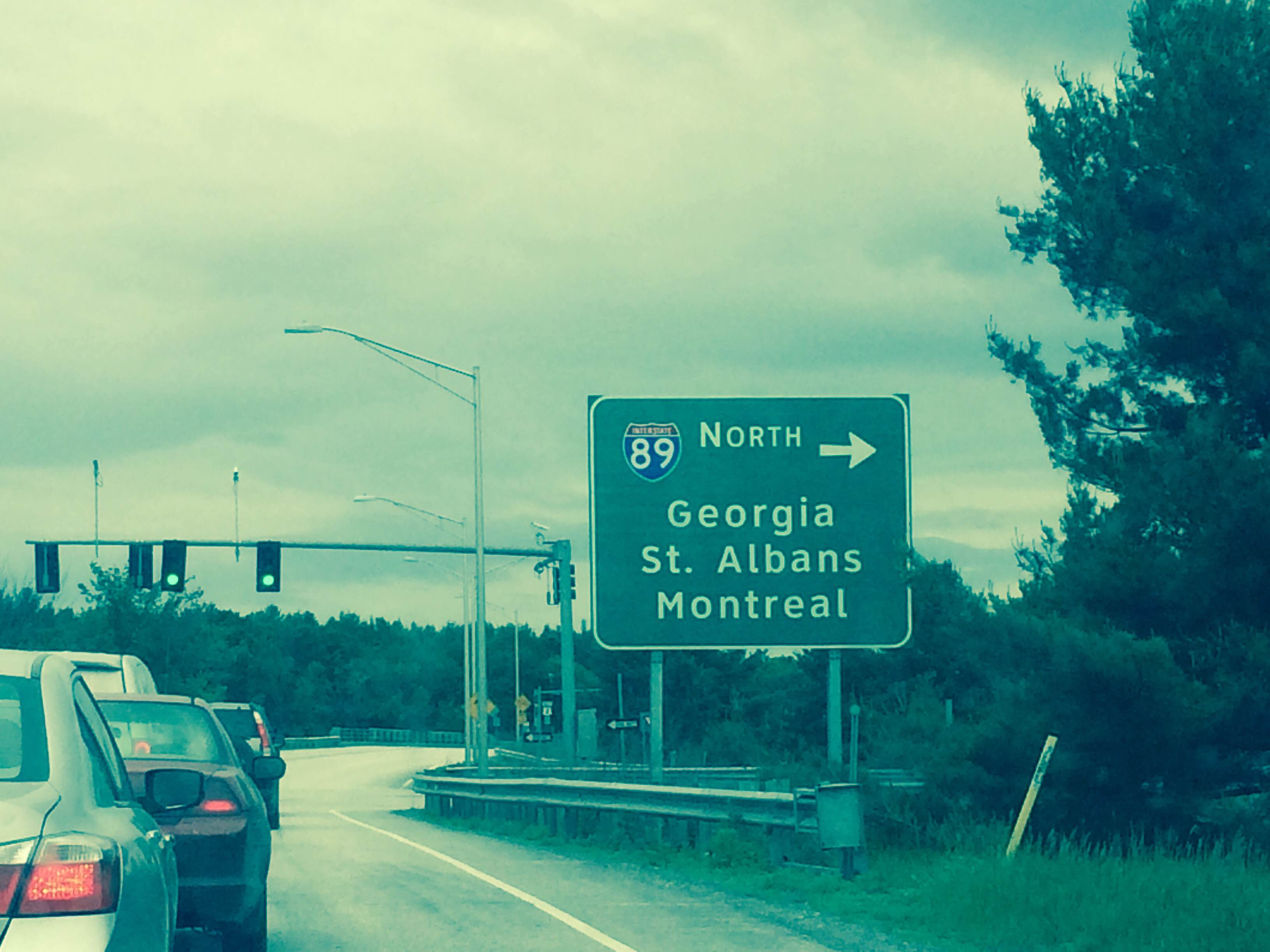
I-89 exit 17 in Colchester (June 5, 2015), Chittenden County

I-89 is one of Vermont's most important roads, as it is the only Interstate Highway to directly serve both Vermont's capital city (Montpelier) and largest city (Burlington). Other important cities and towns located along I-89 are Barre, Waterbury, and St. Albans. Williston, which has become Burlington's big-box retail center (and one of the fastest-growing towns in the state) over the past decade, also has an interchange along I-89.

Crossing the Connecticut River into Vermont, I-89 continues the northwesterly direction it carried in New Hampshire. The Interstate intersects I-91 at a previously unnumbered interchange (now exit 1) immediately upon entering Vermont. Shortly afterward, another interchange with US 4 occurs. The highway begins to enter the scenic rolling hills of Vermont, turning almost due northward about 20 miles (32 km) from the New Hampshire state line, and continues through the high country of central Vermont. The Interstate passes through the towns of Sharon, Royalton, Bethel, Randolph, Brookfield, and Williamstown before reaching the "twin cities" of Barre and Montpelier in the middle of Vermont. The Interstate's highest point was said to be in the town of Brookfield, although the sign that made the declaration was taken down in the late 1990s.

Another directional shift, again to the northwest, occurs while passing the interchange for Montpelier. For the next 40 miles (64 km), I-89's path is not so much chosen as it is logical: paralleling the Winooski River and US 2, the highway cuts through the section of the Appalachian Mountains known as the Green Mountains, and is surrounded by peaks of over 4,000 feet (1,200 m): Camel's Hump to the south and Mount Mansfield to the north. US 2 crosses the Interstate frequently, and has several interchanges with it, en route to Burlington.

I-89 was unique due to one instance of its signage. Between (Vermont) exits 9 and 10, a sign showing the distance to the next control cities in each direction was completely in metric. While there are many instances of signs being in both miles and kilometers, this was the only case of solely metric in the entire Interstate System. Both signs were replaced in 2010 and show distances in miles only. (I-19 in Arizona used to be the other "only signed in metric" Interstate in the US, but has been changed over in recent years as the last two kilometers have been changed.) Speed limit signs have always been posted in miles per hour.

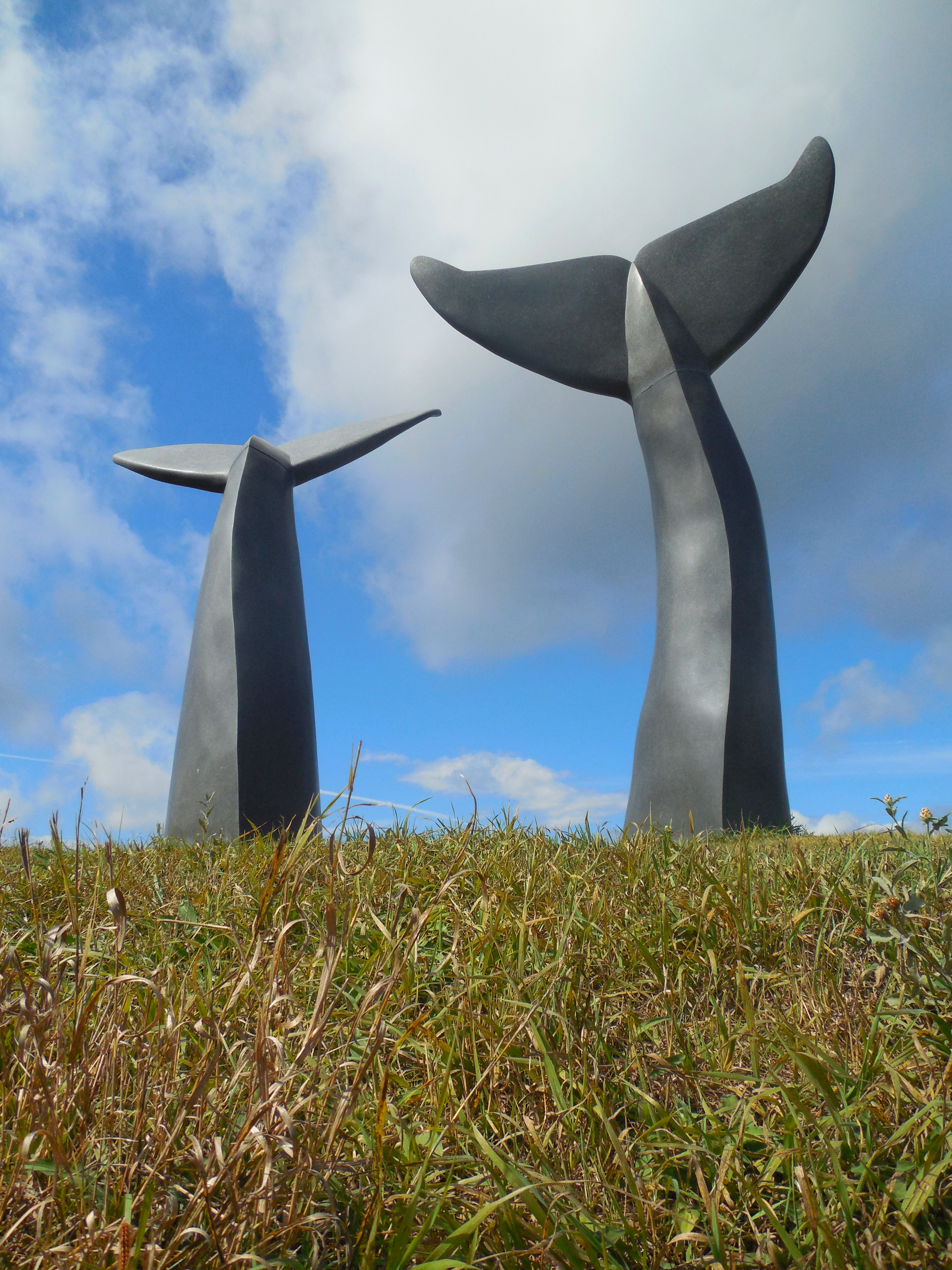
Reverence along I-89 northbound in South Burlington, just west of exit 12

After exit 11 in Richmond, I-89 leaves the Green Mountains to enter the Champlain Valley, and a notable shift in the landscape is visible. Here, just outside Burlington, the highway turns northward once again. Also, at this turn is where the only official auxiliary highway starts, I-189. A second highway, I-289, was proposed as a beltway through Burlington's northeastern suburbs in the 1980s; amid controversy, the highway has only been partially completed as Vermont Route 289 (VT 289), a super two roadway. It has yet to directly meet its parent.

Passing I-189 at exit 13, I-89 sees the busiest freeway interchange in the entire state, exit 14. A full cloverleaf interchange at this exit provides access to downtown Burlington, the University of Vermont, and the retail-heavy Dorset Street, via US 2. Heading north from Burlington, the landscape quickly fades from suburban development into rolling hills more characteristic of northern New England, providing a vista overlooking Lake Champlain. I-89 passes through Milton, Georgia, St. Albans, Swanton, and finally the border town of Highgate Springs. The highway ends at the Canada–United States border at the Highgate Springs–St. Armand/Philipsburg Border Crossing in Highgate Springs. Its final exit, which northbound motorists can use to reverse direction onto I-89 south without crossing the border, is exit 22—the highest exit number along the route. US 7 has its northern terminus at this interchange as well.

The divided highway continues about four miles (6.4 kilometers) into Philipsburg, Quebec, as a dual carriageway-section of Route 133, then changes to Autoroute 35 and continues to Saint-Jean-sur-Richelieu and Chambly before it meets Autoroute 10, which goes to Montreal. The I-89 border crossing is the only instance where an Interstate entering Quebec does not become an Autoroute upon entry. There were plans to complete the extension of Autoroute 35 from Saint-Sébastien to the border crossing at I-89's northern terminus in 2025, creating a freeway-to-freeway connection, but the final phase was indefinitely postponed in March 2025.

== History ==
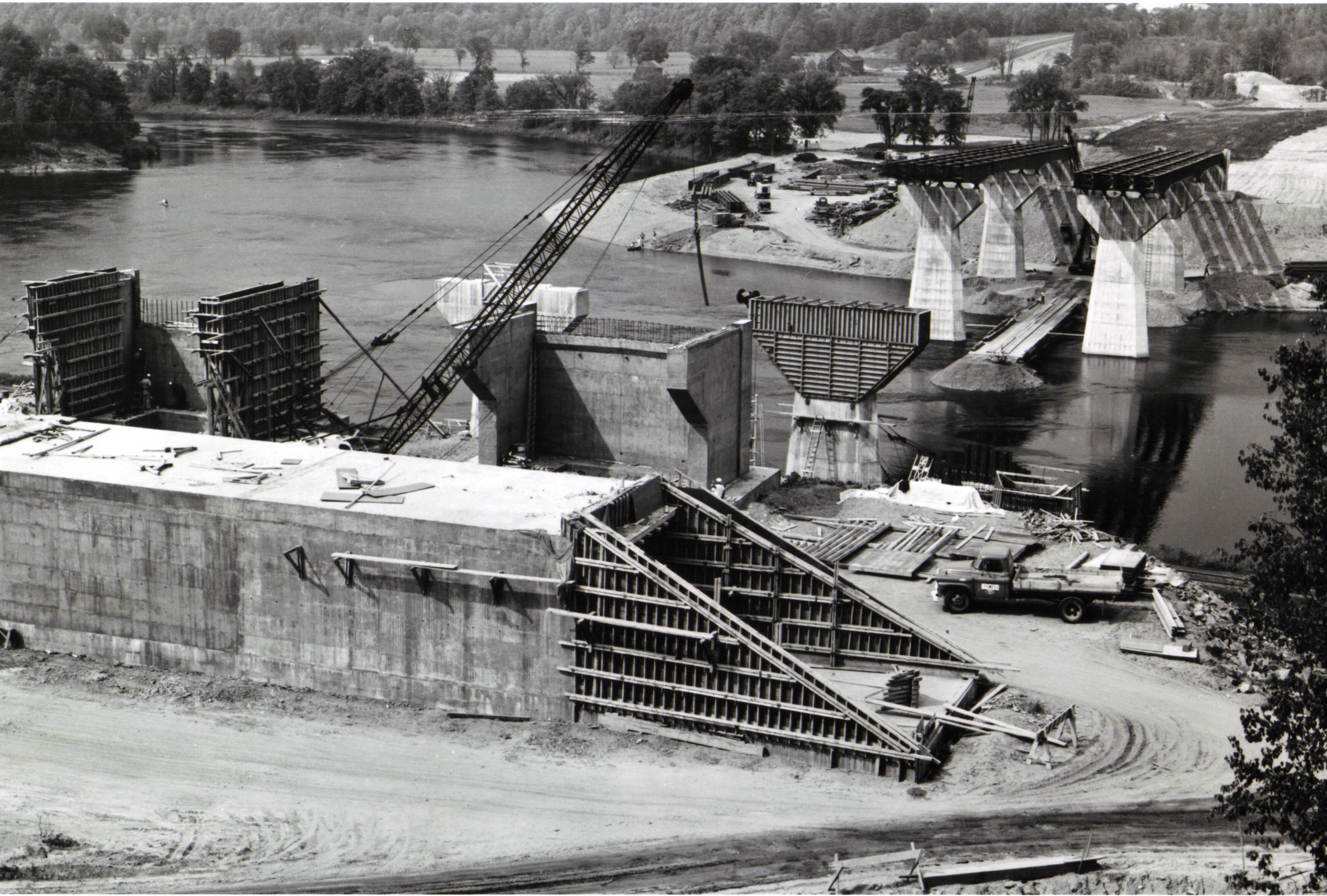
Construction of the White River Bridge near White River Junction, Vermont (1965)

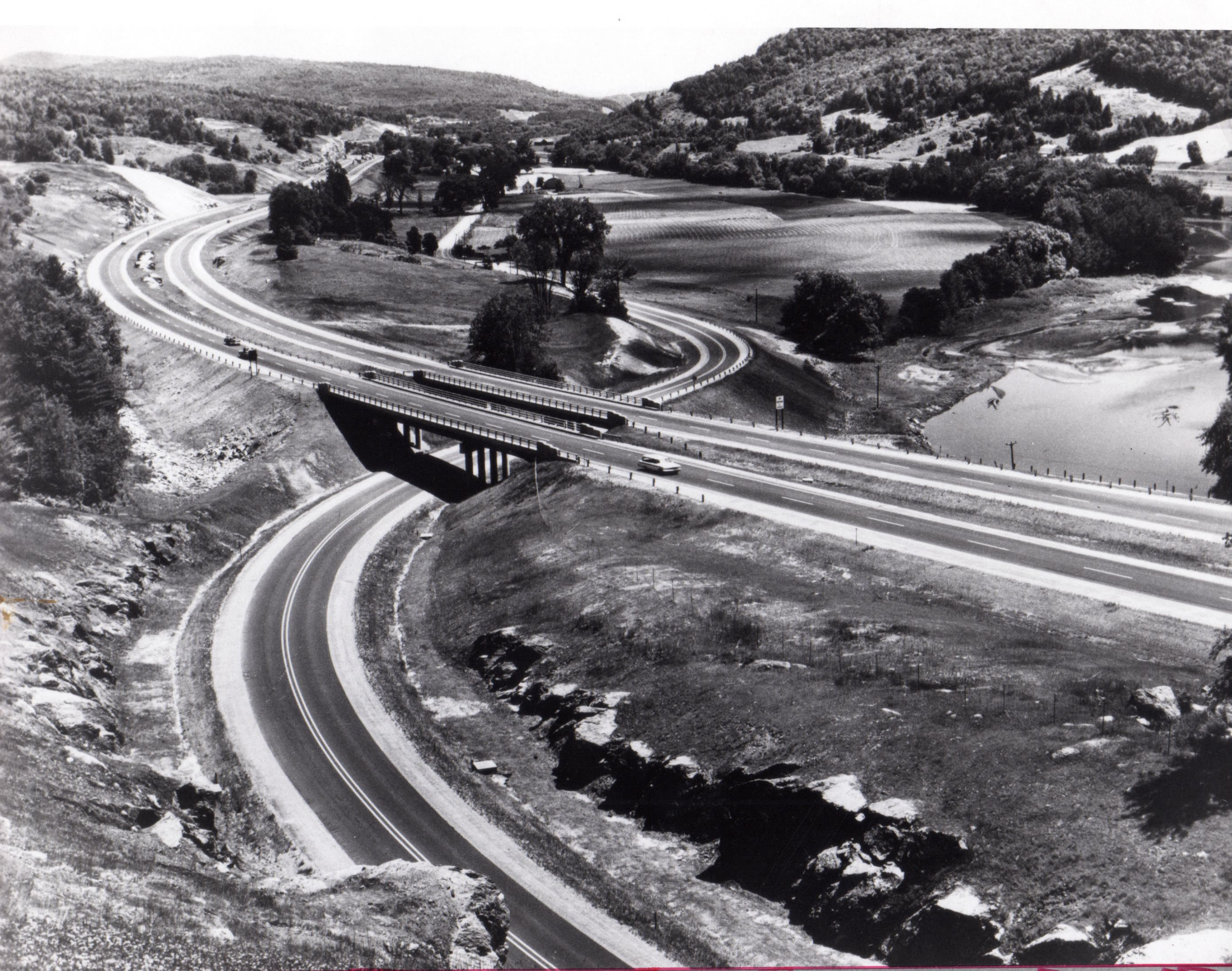
I-89 looking easterly up the Winooski River valley, crossing U.S. Route 2, approximately 2 3/4 miles west of Waterbury (1963)

=== Construction ===
I-89 was commissioned as part of the Federal-Aid Highway Act of 1956, meant to connect Norwalk, Connecticut, to the Canada–United States border via the US 7 corridor, which is the current northern terminus of I-89. Within three years, however, opposition to the project (particularly from Massachusetts, which desired a freeway connection from Boston to Montreal) shifted I-89 to its present alignment that connects Boston with Montreal. The first section of the highway was opened between Montpelier and Middlesex, Vermont, in November 1960, and between Middlesex and Waterbury in December 1960. The highway was subsequently opened between Waterbury and Bolton in November 1961; between South Burlington and Winooski in November 1962; between Winooski and Colchester and between Richmond and South Burlington in November 1963; between Bolton and Richmond in October 1964; in Colchester in November 1964; and between Swanton and Highgate in 1965. The Interstate was opened in most parts of New Hampshire in 1967, and the entirety of the route was opened in 1982.

=== Original proposal ===
I-89 was originally supposed to be a directly north–south route from I-95 in Norwalk, Connecticut, to its current northern terminus at the Canada–United States border. The route shifted after opposition came from residents and local lawmakers in interior New England who did not want an Interstate running through their countryside and towns. One major problem that was a big part in sinking the project was that the highway would have to go through the Green Mountain National Forest in Vermont. Parts of the Interstate were built in Connecticut, between Norwalk and Wilton and from Brookfield to Danbury, a short bypass around Lenox, Massachusetts, and in southern Vermont between Bennington and Manchester and are currently designated as US 7. The state of Connecticut had plans to extend the Norwalk segment to meet with the Danbury segment but has instead opted to widen portions of the existing road to four lanes. There has always been talk of building the original route of I-89, as it would bring economic development to cities like Pittsfield, Massachusetts, and Bennington, Vermont, and connect parts of the interior Northeast to New York City, but nothing has ever been formally proposed since the original proposal in the 1950s.

=== Other routes between Boston and Montreal ===
The current route of I-89 is the main artery between Boston and Montreal, two large metropolitan areas in the US and Canada, respectively. Before I-89 was built, there was no limited-access route between the two cities. The route between the two cities is not complete, however, as Autoroute 35 in Quebec still needs to be extended south of its current terminus to connect to I-89 at the Canada–United States border. In 2019, it was announced that the highway would be complete by 2023, As of July 2022, grading of the right of way between the existing terminus at exit 15 to Chemin Champlain is in progress.

== Future ==
Vermont and New Hampshire are working together to reconstruct the Vietnam Veterans Memorial Bridge over the Connecticut River. As part of construction, the deck and superstructure of the bridge would be replaced, and auxiliary lanes would be added to give more merging room for travelers entering and exiting I-89 at the exits for I-91. Construction will occur between 2020 and 2022.

The Vermont Agency of Transportation (VTrans) has released plans to build a diverging diamond interchange along I-89 at exit 16 (milepost exit 91; US 2/US 7) in Colchester, the first interchange of its kind in the state. Construction was expected to start in early 2023 and be completed in late 2025. However, phase I of construction began earlier than originally planned in winter 2022. Phase I work will relocate utilities, replace waterlines, and remove ledges, along with additional work on retaining walls and drainage. Working on the diverging diamond itself is expected to begin in fall 2024 once bidding and a contract let has been made. However, its completion has now been pushed back to mid-2026.

Starting in early 2024, VTrans is improving the interchange at exit 17 (milepost 97; US 2/US 7) at I-89 and the Chimney Corner intersection of US 2 and US 7 in Colchester, with corresponding roadway improvements and the replacement of the existing bridge carrying US 2 over I-89 within the project limits. In order to address safety concerns of traffic backing up onto I-89 northbound, the intersection of the northbound off-ramp and US 2 will be improved by adding a left turn lane onto US 2 eastbound to increase capacity. The southbound off-ramp will also be reconstructed to make way for a new southbound on-ramp to eliminate the left-turn conflict point for vehicles accessing I-89 southbound from US 2 westbound. In addition, the intersection of US 2 and US 7 will be reconfigured along with the widening of the roadways to accommodate additional turning lanes, all of which are key project elements in reducing queuing and delays. Construction will last for three construction seasons and, as of June 2024, is expected to be completed in mid-2026.

== Exit list ==
New Hampshire uses sequential exit numbering, with the interchange with I-93 in Concord being unnumbered. In 2020, Vermont added "milepoint exit" numbers to existing signs, essentially marking each interchange with two exit numbers (except the I-91 interchange, which was previously unnumbered). However, the gore point exit number signs continue to show only the sequential exit numbers.

State	County	Location	mi	km	Old exit	New exit	Destinations	Notes
New Hampshire	Merrimack	Bow	0.000	0.000		–	NH 3A to US 3 – Bow Junction, Concord, Hooksett, Manchester	Southern terminus; at-grade intersection
New Hampshire	Merrimack	Bow				–	I-93 (Everett Turnpike) to I-393 east / US 4 (US 202) – Concord, Portsmouth, Manchester, Boston	Southbound exit and northbound entrance
New Hampshire	Merrimack	Bow	0.223	0.359		1	Logging Hill Road – Bow	
New Hampshire	Merrimack	Concord	2.127	3.423		2	NH 13 (Clinton Street) – Concord	
New Hampshire	Merrimack	Concord	3.848	6.193		3	Stickney Hill Road	Northbound exit and southbound entrance
New Hampshire	Merrimack	Hopkinton	6.594	10.612		4	US 202 / NH 9 to NH 103 – Hopkinton	Northbound exit and southbound entrance
New Hampshire	Merrimack	Hopkinton	8.533	13.733		5	US 202 / NH 9 – Henniker, Keene, Hopkinton	No southbound access to US 202 east/NH 9 east
New Hampshire	Merrimack	Hopkinton	10.207	16.427		6	NH 127 – Contoocook, West Hopkinton	
New Hampshire	Merrimack	Warner	14.187	22.832		7	NH 103 – Davisville, Contoocook	
New Hampshire	Merrimack	Warner	16.788	27.018		8	NH 103 – Warner	Northbound exit and southbound entrance
New Hampshire	Merrimack	Warner	19.930	32.074		9	NH 103 – Warner, Bradford	Also serves Newport and Claremont
New Hampshire	Merrimack	Sutton	26.871	43.245		10	North Road to NH 114 – Sutton	Access to NH 114 via Gile Pond Road
New Hampshire	Merrimack	New London	30.918	49.758		11	NH 11 east (King Hill Road) – New London	Southern end of NH 11 concurrency
New Hampshire	Merrimack	New London	34.593	55.672		12	NH 11 west to NH 103A – New London, Sunapee	Northern end of NH 11 concurrency
New Hampshire	Sullivan	Sunapee	37.023	59.583		12A	To NH 114 – Georges Mills, Springfield	Access via Georges Mill Road; to NH 11
New Hampshire	Sullivan	Grantham	43.040	69.266		13	NH 10 south – Grantham, Croydon	Southern end of NH 10 concurrency
New Hampshire	Sullivan	Grantham	48.020	77.281		14	North Grantham	Southbound exit and northbound entrance; access via Old Route 10
New Hampshire	Grafton	Enfield	50.376	81.072		15	Smith Pond Road / Old Route 10 – Montcalm	
New Hampshire	Grafton	Enfield	51.799	83.362		16	Methodist Hill Road / Eastman Hill Road – Purmort	To Whaleback Mountain Road
New Hampshire	Grafton	Lebanon	54.128	87.111		17	US 4 to NH 4A – Enfield, Canaan	Former I-89 Bus.; also serves Enfield Shaker Museum and Mascoma Lake
New Hampshire	Grafton	Lebanon	56.018	90.152		18	NH 120 – Lebanon, Hanover	Also serves Dartmouth College and Dartmouth-Hitchcock Medical Center
New Hampshire	Grafton	Lebanon	58.300	93.825		19	US 4 / NH 10 north – West Lebanon, Hanover	Northern end of NH 10 concurrency; former I-89 Bus.
New Hampshire	Grafton	Lebanon	60.331	97.093		20	NH 12A – West Lebanon, Claremont	Also serves Plainfield and Lebanon Municipal Airport
Connecticut River			60.864 0.000	97.951 0.000	Vietnam Veterans Memorial Bridge			
Vermont	Windsor	Hartford	0.570	0.917	-	1	I-91 – White River Junction, Brattleboro	Signed as exits 1A (north) and 1B (south) northbound; exits 10A-B (69A-B) on I-91
Vermont	Windsor	Quechee	3.930	6.325	1	3	US 4 – Woodstock, Rutland	Rutland not signed southbound; also serves Quechee and Killington
Vermont	Windsor	Sharon	13.420	21.597	2	13	VT 132 to VT 14 – Sharon, South Royalton	
Vermont	Windsor	Royalton	22.120	35.599	3	22	VT 107 to VT 14 / VT 100 – Bethel, Royalton	Also serves Joseph Smith birthplace, Rutland, and Vermont Law School
Vermont	Orange	Randolph	30.900	49.729	4	30	VT 66 to VT 12 – Randolph	
Vermont	Orange	Williamstown	42.950	69.121	5	42	VT 64 to VT 12 / VT 14 – Northfield, Williamstown	Also serves Brookfield and Norwich University
Vermont	Washington	Berlin	46.920	75.510	6	47	VT 63 east to VT 14 – South Barre, Barre	Western terminus of VT 63
Vermont	Washington	Berlin	50.290	80.934	7	50	VT 62 east to US 302 – Berlin, Barre	Western terminus of VT 62; also serves Edward F. Knapp State Airport
Vermont	Washington	Montpelier	52.940	85.199	8	52	US 2 to VT 12 – Montpelier, St. Johnsbury	VT 12/St. Johnsbury not signed northbound
Vermont	Washington	Middlesex	58.720	94.501	9	58	US 2 to VT 100B – Middlesex, Moretown	Also serves Waitsfield, Warren, and Mad River Byway
Vermont	Washington	Waterbury	63.760	102.612	10	63	VT 100 to US 2 – Waterbury, Stowe	Also serves Waitsfield and Warren
Vermont	Chittenden	Richmond	78.410	126.189	11	78	US 2 to VT 117 – Richmond, Williston, Bolton	
Vermont	Chittenden	Williston	83.960	135.121	12	83	VT 2A to US 2 / VT 116 – Williston, Essex Junction	Also serves Burlington International Airport, Vermont Technical College, Hinesburg and Bristol
Vermont	Chittenden	South Burlington	87.490	140.802	13	87	I-189 west to US 7 – Burlington, Shelburne, Rutland	Eastern terminus of I-189; also serves Vergennes and Middlebury
Vermont	Chittenden	South Burlington	88.730	142.797	14	88	US 2 – South Burlington, Burlington	Signed as exits 14E (88A) (east) and 14W (88B) (west); serves Burlington International Airport, University of Vermont, and Champlain College
Vermont	Chittenden	Winooski	90.480	145.613	15	90	VT 15 – Winooski, Essex Junction	Northbound exit and southbound entrance; serves Saint Michael's College, Community College of Vermont
Vermont	Chittenden	Colchester	91.490	147.239	16	91	US 2 / US 7 to VT 15 – Winooski, Colchester	VT 15 not signed northbound; interchange currently under construction to become diverging diamond interchange
Vermont	Chittenden	Colchester	97.870	157.506	17	97	US 2 / US 7 – Lake Champlain Islands, Milton, Colchester	Also serves New York State via ferry or bridge
Vermont	Franklin	Georgia	106.550	171.476	18	106	US 7 / VT 104A – Georgia Center, Fairfax, Milton	
Vermont	Franklin	Town of St. Albans	113.750	183.063	19	113	St. Albans State Highway to US 7 / VT 36 / VT 104 – St. Albans	Also serves VT 105 to Enosburg and Richford
Vermont	Franklin	Town of St. Albans	117.630	189.307	20	117	US 7 / VT 207 – St. Albans	
Vermont	Franklin	Town of Swanton	123.370	198.545	21	123	VT 78 to US 7 – Swanton	Also serves Highgate Center and New York State
Vermont	Franklin	Highgate	129.830	208.941	22	129	US 7 south – Highgate Springs	Northern terminus of US 7
Vermont	Franklin	Highgate	130.254	209.623	–	–	R-133 north to A-35 – Saint-Jean-sur-Richelieu, Chambly, Montréal	Continuation into Quebec; future connection with A-35
1.000 mi = 1.609 km; 1.000 km = 0.621 mi: Concurrency terminus; Incomplete access

== Related routes ==
- I-89 Business (I-89 Bus.) was looped through the city of Lebanon, New Hampshire, along US 4.
- I-189 is a connector between the Champlain Parkway/US 7 and I-89 in South Burlington, Vermont.
- I-289 was slated to go around Burlington, but it was never completed. The lone completed section of the highway is signed as VT 289.
