= Plug-in electric vehicles in Vermont =

As of December 2021, there were about 5,000 electric vehicles in Vermont, accounting for less than 1% of all vehicles in the state. As of August 2021, 5.1% of new vehicle registrations in the state were electric.

In 2021, Vermont was ranked by AutoInsuranceEZ as the third-best state in the United States for electric vehicle ownership.

== Government policy ==
In December 2019, the Vermont Agency of Transportation announced a tax rebate of up to $4,000 for the purchase of plug-in hybrid vehicles, and up to $5,000 for all-electric vehicles.

== Charging stations ==
As of February 2022, there were about 900 charging stations in Vermont. As of November 2021, there were 16 DC charging locations in the state.

== By region ==
=== Burlington ===
As of January 2021, there were about 1,600 electric vehicles registered in Chittenden County, equivalent to 1 for every 102 residents, the highest in the state.
