= Allis State Park =

State park in Orange County, Vermont

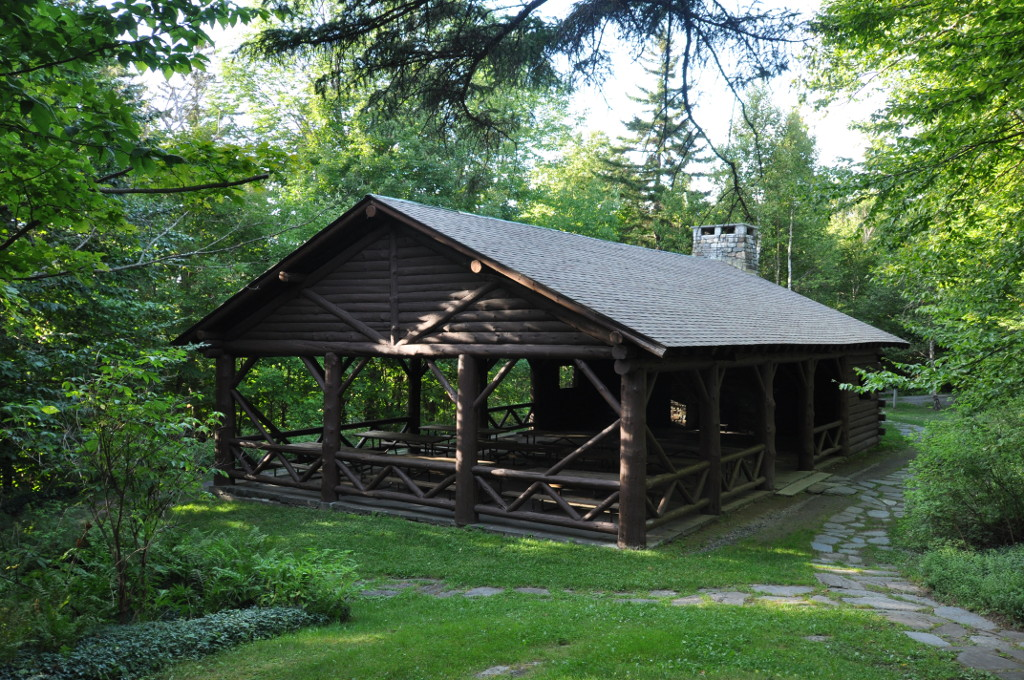
- Picnic pavilion

- Location within Vermont
- Interactive map of Allis State Park
- Location: Brookfield, Vermont, United States
- Coordinates: 44°2′54″N 72°38′6″W
- Area: 625 acres (253 ha)
- Established: 1928
- Administrator: Vermont Department of Forests, Parks, and Recreation
- Open: Memorial Day weekend - Labor Day weekend
- Website: Official website
- Vermont State Parks
- Allis State Park
- U.S. National Register of Historic Places
- U.S. Historic district
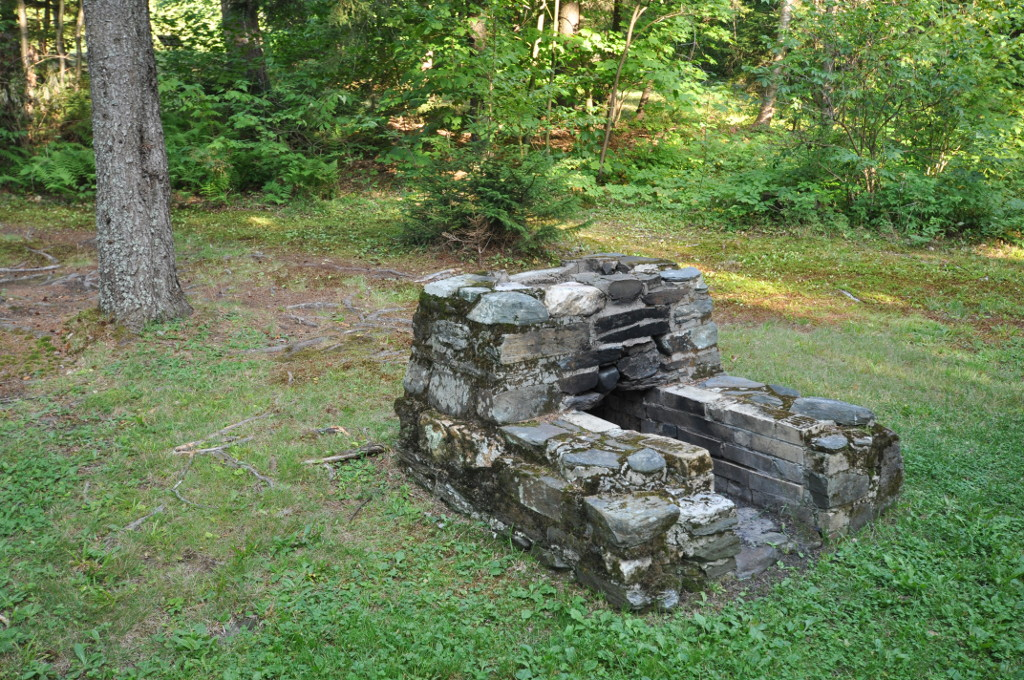
- Fireplace built by the CCC
- NRHP reference No.: 02000280
- Added to NRHP: March 29, 2002

Allis State Park is a state park in Brookfield, Vermont. Established in 1928, Allis State Park was the second state park to be created in Vermont. It is named for Wallace S. Allis, who willed his Bear Mountain Farm to the State of Vermont to be developed as a campground and recreational area. In 1932, the park was developed by the Civilian Conservation Corps (CCC), which built the access roads, constructed a picnic shelter, picnic grounds and a campground. There is a fire/lookout tower on Bear Hill.

== Location and features ==
Allis State Park encompasses 625 acres (253 ha) of uplands in the watershed of Vermont's White River in western Brookfield, occupying part of a ridge bounded on the east by Bear Hill Road/Vermont Route 65 and on the west by Vermont Route 12. The park is accessed from Bear Hill Road/VT 65, which is one of the last remaining Vermont state highways that is still maintained as a gravel road.

The park's principal feature is the summit of Bear Hill, which is accessed via the park road from Bear Hill Road. The park road rises to the west before bending south, after which it reaches the entrance gate and then subsequently splits. The right-hand road loops around the campground, while the left-hand road serves the day-use area, which includes the picnic area, picnic pavilion, and fire/lookout tower.

The campground loop has 18 tent sites, along with 8 lean-to sites, for a total of 26 campsites. Water is available from faucets throughout the campground, and there is a comfort station with restrooms near the middle of the camping loop where showers are available. There is also a campsite for group camping that is set apart from the rest of the campsites. The day-use area connects to the campground via a short, marked trail.

The Bear Hill Nature Trail is a 3/4 mile hiking loop that connects to the day-use/picnic area at both ends. A horseshoe pit is also located at the picnic area where there are picnic tables, grills and fireplaces.The fire/lookout tower, at the center of the picnic area, provides 360 degree views of the surrounding mountains of Vermont. The picnic pavilion has handicap-accessible restrooms that serve the day-use area.

== History ==
The park was created in 1928 when Wallace Allis gifted his farm to the people of Vermont. Prior to making the gift, Allis had allowed area residents to the upper areas of his farm, which provide views over the surrounding countryside. The park facilities were developed in the 1930s by the Civilian Conservation Corps, which constructed the access road, camping loop, and picnic pavilion. The park facilities were listed on the National Register of Historic Places in 2002.

== See also ==
- National Register of Historic Places listings in Orange County, Vermont
