= Tip Top Building =

Building complex in Vermont, U.S.

Coordinates: 43°38′58″N 72°19′13″W

The Tip Top Building is a 45,000 square foot (4,200 m^{2}) arts and creative business center located in downtown White River Junction, Vermont.

The building is actually a complex of several buildings dating from the 1880s, when the Smith Baking Company operated it as a commercial bakery. In 1910, the Vermont Baking Company purchased Smith Baking Company and erected what is now the center of the complex. Several additions were made over decades, primarily covered loading docks to protect delivery trucks from weather and a garage to repair trucks. Ward Baking company purchased the complex and ran the bakery until 1974 when it closed. The property changed hands several times in the next 25 years as it was used for a variety of industrial purposes, motor rewinding being the final use.

In 2000, Matt Bucy, a White River Junction, Vermont resident, purchased the complex with the help of a group of investors. He was a former engineer with New England Digital (a now-defunct pioneer in the synthesizer and digital audio industries), and a Yale-trained architect.

Initially, Bucy envisioned an arts and media center with studios for artists and some larger spaces for internet and media companies. A proposed Dartmouth Media Institute, an offshoot of Dartmouth College, conceived by composer Jon Appleton (who was also the founder of New England Digital) and funded by some prominent corporations, was envisioned as the media anchor. The building was located directly across the street from a major Verizon regional switching facility, which made it a desirable location for those in need of high-speed telecommunications links. After September 11 and the collapse of the internet bubble, plans for high tech companies and the Institute dissolved, forcing a replanning of the building into smaller, more affordable spaces that individuals could rent.

This strategy worked and by February 2003 most of the building was leased to artists and small creative businesses, including a large number of healing arts practitioners, and a restaurant. In 2004, the building was used as an example of the burgeoning "creative economy" in a conference held in Woodstock, Vermont.
