= Reverence (sculpture) =

Public sculpture in Vermont USA, unveiled 1989

Coordinates: 44°26′44″N 73°08′35″W

Reverence

Reverence with the Green Mountains in the background

Reverence is a sculpture in Vermont created by Jim Sardonis in 1989 that depicts two tails of whales "diving" into a sea of grass. It is meant to symbolize the fragility of the planet. The tails were made from 36 tons of African black granite and stand 12 to 13 feet (3.7 to 4.0 m) tall.

The sculpture was commissioned by British metals trader David Threlkeld, who was then a resident of Randolph, Vermont. The tails were to be at the entrance to a conference center that Threlkeld was planning, but financing fell through and Threlkeld moved to Arizona. After ten years at this Randolph site, they were sold and then moved to Technology Park in South Burlington where FedEx has a distribution center and public hiking trail with parking lot.

The Whale Tails, as the sculpture is more commonly known by local residents, is a landmark on the north side of Interstate 89 between exit 12 in Williston and exit 13 in South Burlington, notable partly because Vermont is a landlocked state. The sculpture has graced the covers of at least two books, Weird New England by Joseph A. Citro and the art history textbook A World of Art by Henry Sayre.

This sculpture is documented in the Smithsonian's Save Outdoor Sculpture! database. The sculpture was examined for Save Outdoor Sculpture! in 1992 while it was located along Interstate 89, west of exit 4, Randolph Center, Vermont.

== Whales in Vermont ==
Fossils of marine invertebrates found in the Champlain Valley reveal that Vermont was underwater during the Paleozoic Era, more than 300 million years ago, long before the advent of mammals. In recent geologic history, the last glacier melted away about 12,500 years ago, and the sea poured in. This inland sea was inhabited by many of the animals that inhabit the North Atlantic today, including mollusks, sea urchins, squid, herring, cod, salmon, seals, and belugas. In 1849, while constructing a railroad, workmen uncovered the bones of a beluga whale in a swampy area in Charlotte, Vermont. The fossil beluga is housed in the Perkins Museum at the University of Vermont. By about 10,000 years ago, the Champlain Valley had risen above sea level. The valley's waters drained northward into the St. Lawrence River, a major waterway in Canada connecting the Great Lakes with the Atlantic Ocean. Over 20 fossils of ancient beluga whales have been found around Lake Champlain.

== The artist ==
Jim Sardonis is a jewelry maker as well. Some of his jewelry is based on Reverence including rings depicting the two tail

Sardonis said about his work:

My work is inspired by natural forms – human, plant, and animal ... I seek opportunities to use my work to emphasize the kinship and interconnectedness of all living things and the importance of the survival of each of them.

— Jim Sardonis, in an interview
