= Williamstown (CDP), Vermont =

Census-designated place in Vermont, United States

Williamstown, Vermont
- Census-designated place
- Location within Vermont Location within the United States
- Coordinates: 44°07′38″N 72°32′32″W
- Country: United States
- State: Vermont
- County: Orange
- Town: Williamstown

Area
  - Total: 3.36 sq mi (8.71 km^{2})
  - Land: 3.36 sq mi (8.69 km^{2})
  - Water: 0.0077 sq mi (0.02 km^{2})
- Elevation: 886 ft (270 m)

Population (2020)
  - Total: 1,264
- Time zone: UTC-5 (Eastern (EST))
  - Summer (DST): UTC-4 (EDT)
- ZIP Code: 05679
- Area code: 802
- FIPS code: 50-84100
- GNIS feature ID: 2586660

Williamstown is the primary village and a census-designated place (CDP) in the town of Williamstown, Orange County, Vermont, United States. As of the 2020 census, it had a population of 1,264, out of 3,515 in the entire town of Williamstown.

== Geography ==
The CDP is in northwestern Orange County, in the north-central part of the town of Williamstown. It is in the valley of the Stevens Branch of the Winooski River, part of the Lake Champlain watershed. Vermont Route 14 passes through the village center, leading north 6 miles (10 km) to Barre and south through Williamstown Gulf 26 miles (42 km) to South Royalton in the White River Valley. Vermont Route 64 leads west from Williamstown village 4 miles (6 km) to Interstate 89.
