= Sunset Lake Floating Bridge =

Bridge in Vermont, US

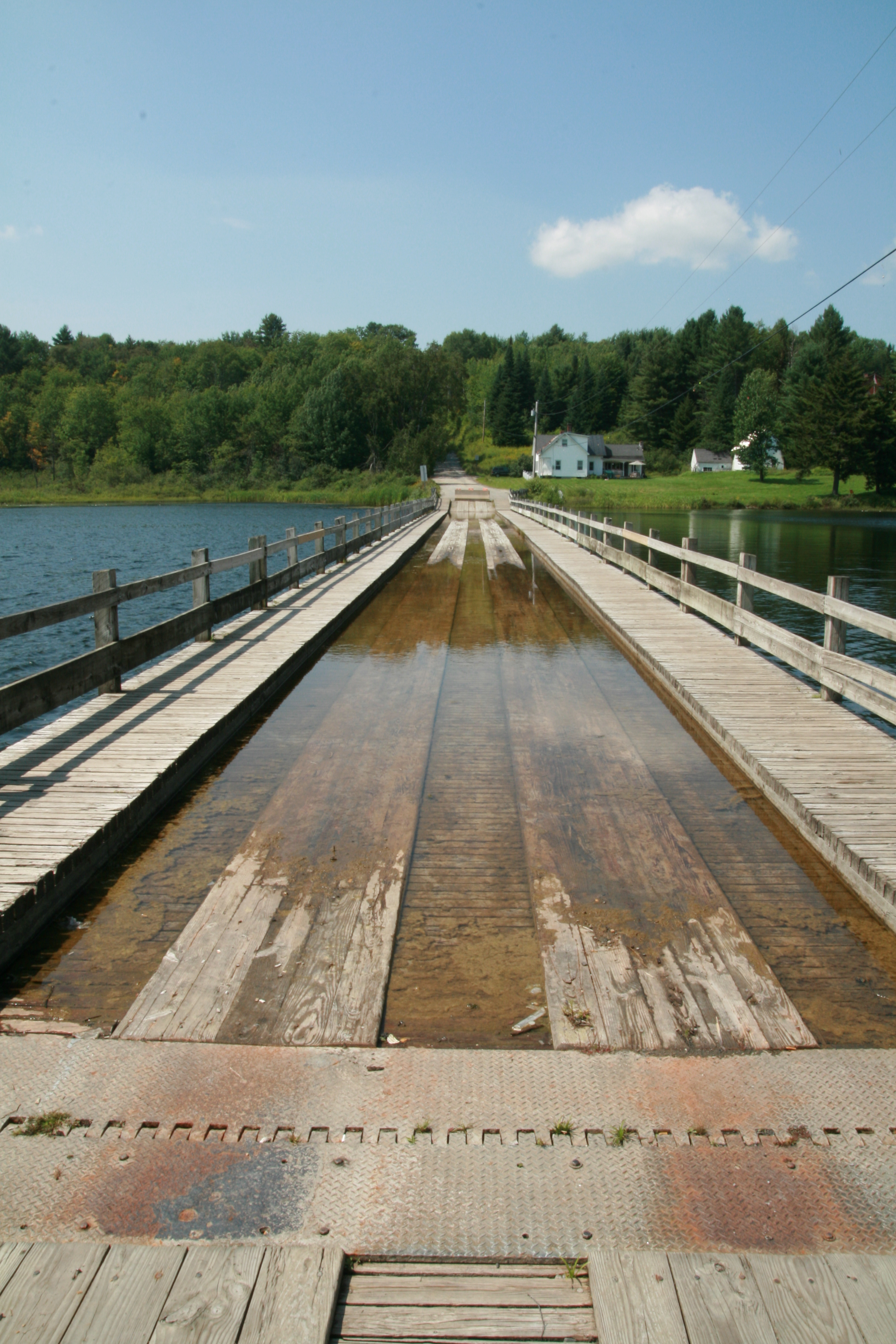
- Sunset Lake Floating Bridge in 2008
- Coordinates: 44.042525°N 72.604651°W
- Carries: 1 lane of VT 65
- Crosses: Sunset Lake
- Locale: Brookfield, Vermont, United States

Characteristics
- Design: Pontoon bridge
- Total length: 318 feet (97 m)
- Design life: 100 years

History
- Construction cost: $2.4M
- Opened: 1820, ?, ?, 1884, ?, 1936, 1978, 2015
- Replaces: previous bridge

Location
- Interactive map of Sunset Lake Floating Bridge

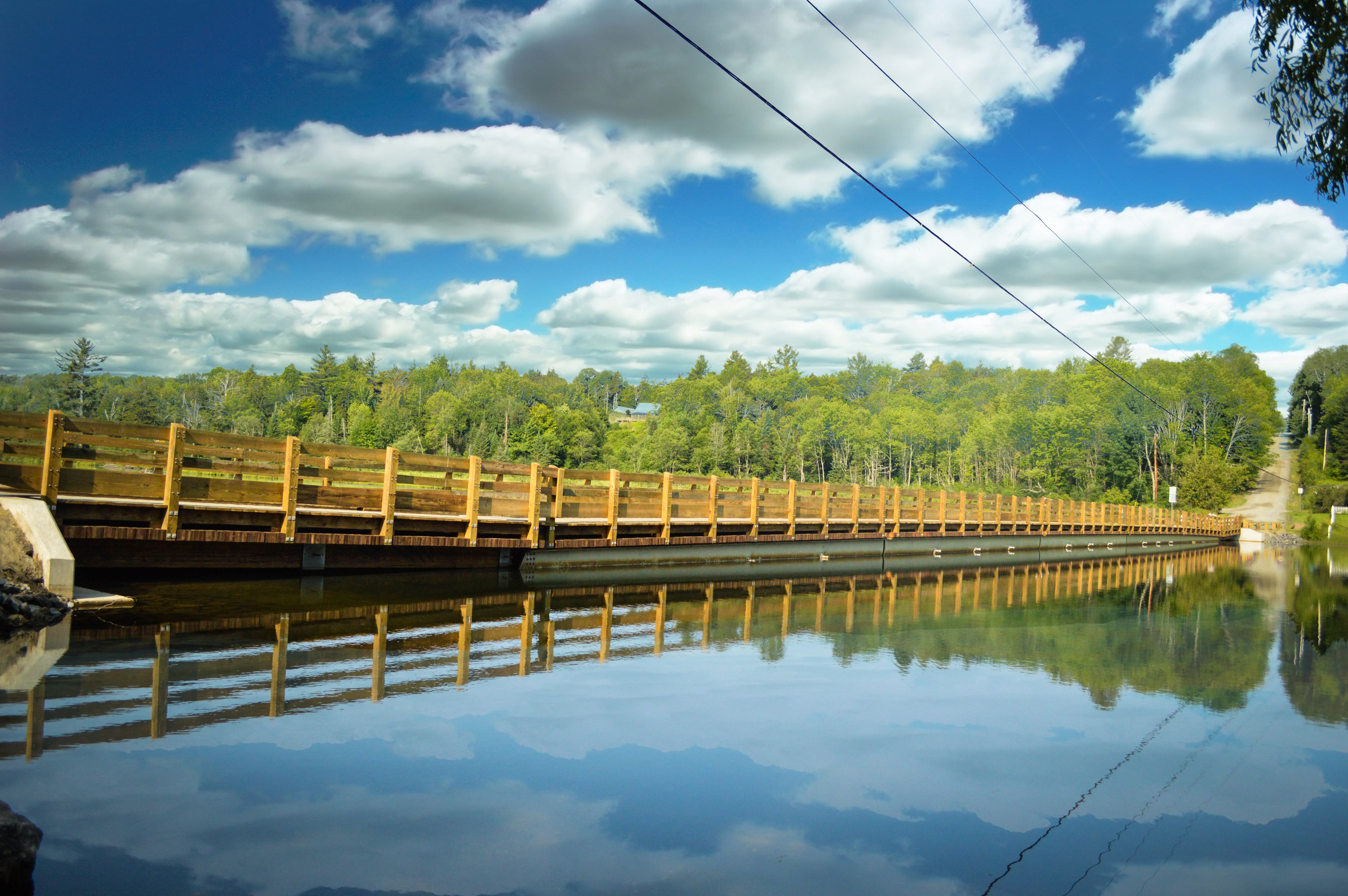
Floating bridge on Sunset Lake in Brookfield, VT

The Sunset Lake Floating Bridge is a floating bridge that carries Vermont Route 65 across Sunset Lake in Brookfield, Vermont, United States.

== History ==
The first bridge on this site was erected in 1820. It was built this way because the lake is too deep for traditional pilings. According to the Watershed Management Division of Vermont, the lake's depth can reach 120 feet (37 m).

The seventh bridge was closed to traffic and torn down in 2008 for replacement due to failure of its flotation system, which was based on foam-filled barrels.

The current bridge, the eighth at this location, is supported by fiber-reinforced polymer pontoons.
