= South Barre, Vermont =

Census-designated place in Vermont, United States

- Census-designated place
- Location in Washington County and the state of Vermont
- Coordinates: 44°09′58″N 72°29′59″W
- Country: United States
- State: Vermont
- County: Washington

Area
  - Total: 2.1 sq mi (5.4 km^{2})
  - Land: 2.1 sq mi (5.4 km^{2})
  - Water: 0 sq mi (0.0 km^{2})
- Elevation: 968 ft (295 m)

Population (2000)
  - Total: 1,242
  - Density: 593/sq mi (229.1/km^{2})
- Time zone: UTC-5 (Eastern (EST))
  - Summer (DST): UTC-4 (EDT)
- ZIP Codes: 05670 (South Barre); 05641 (Barre); 05654 (Graniteville)
- Area code: 802
- FIPS code: 50-66025
- GNIS feature ID: 2378134

South Barre is a census-designated place (CDP) in the town of Barre in Washington County, Vermont, United States. As of the 2020 census, South Barre had a population of 1,193.

== Geography ==
According to the United States Census Bureau, the CDP has a total area of 5.4 km^{2} (2.1 sq mi), all land.

=== Climate ===
This climatic region is typified by large seasonal temperature differences, with warm to hot (and often humid) summers and cold (sometimes severely cold) winters. According to the Köppen Climate Classification system, South Barre has a humid continental climate, abbreviated "Dfb" on climate maps.

== Demographics ==
As of the census of 2000, there were 1,242 people, 534 households, and 367 families residing in the CDP. The population density was 229.4 people /km^{2} (594 people/mi^{2}). There were 553 housing units at an average density of 102.2 units /km^{2} (265 units/mi^{2}). The racial makeup of the CDP was 98.87% White, 0.24% African American, 0.24% Asian, 0.08% from other races, and 0.56% from two or more races. Hispanic or Latino of any race were 2.74% of the population.

There were 534 households, out of which 28.5% had children under the age of 18 living with them, 57.7% were married couples living together, 7.9% had a female householder with no husband present, and 31.1% were non-families. 26.8% of all households were made up of individuals, and 10.3% had someone living alone who was 65 years of age or older. The average household size was 2.33 and the average family size was 2.78.

In the CDP, the population was spread out, with 21.7% under the age of 18, 6.6% from 18 to 24, 26.0% from 25 to 44, 30.3% from 45 to 64, and 15.5% who were 65 years of age or older. The median age was 42 years. For every 100 females, there were 93.5 males. For every 100 females age 18 and over, there were 91.5 males.

The median income for a household in the CDP was $38,750, and the median income for a family was $50,625. Males had a median income of $32,167 versus $22,974 for females. The per capita income for the CDP was $23,480. About 2.9% of families and 5.7% of the population were below the poverty line, including 4.8% of those under age 18 and 3.1% of those age 65 or over.
