= White River Junction, Vermont =

Census-designated place in Vermont, United States

- Census-designated place
- Location in Windsor County and the state of Vermont
- Coordinates: 43°39′00″N 72°19′44″W coordinates_footnotes =
- Country: United States
- State: Vermont
- County: Windsor

Area
  - Total: 1.7 sq mi (4.4 km^{2})
  - Land: 1.7 sq mi (4.3 km^{2})
  - Water: 0.039 sq mi (0.1 km^{2})
- Elevation: 551 ft (168 m)

Population (2020)
  - Total: 2,528
  - Density: 1,500/sq mi (590/km^{2})
- Time zone: UTC-5 (Eastern (EST))
  - Summer (DST): UTC-4 (EDT)
- ZIP codes: 05001, 05009
- Area code: 802
- FIPS code: 50-83575
- GNIS feature ID: 2378350

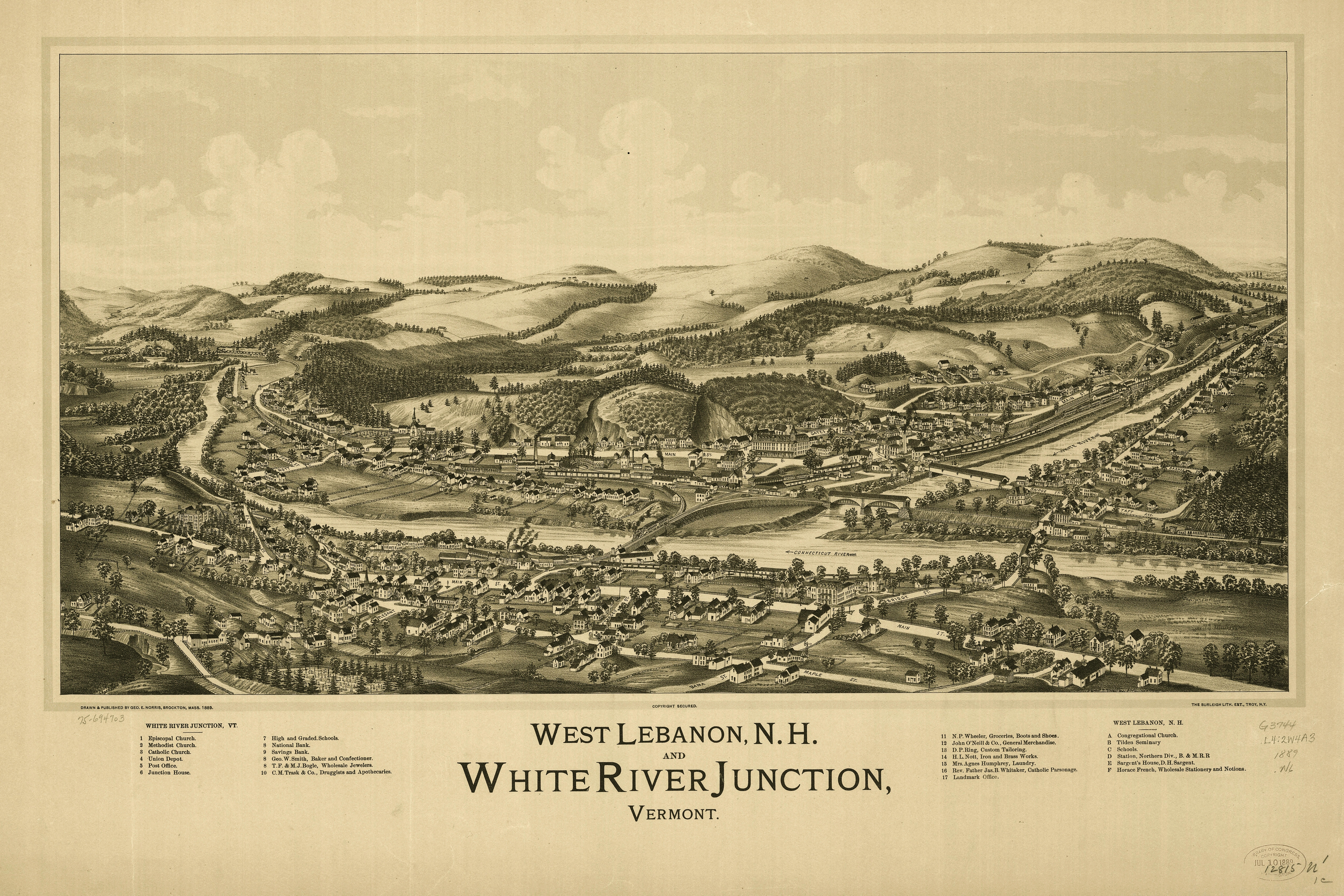
White River Junction in 1889

White River Junction is an unincorporated village and census-designated place (CDP) in the town of Hartford in Windsor County, Vermont, United States. The population was 2,528 at the 2020 census, up from 2,286 in 2010, making it the largest community within the town of Hartford.

The village includes the White River Junction Historic District, a historic district listed on the National Register of Historic Places in 1980 and whose boundaries increased in 2002. The historic district reflects the urban architecture of the area from the late 19th century and early 20th century. The district is bounded by the Central Vermont railroad tracks, Gates Street, and South Main Street. It includes at least 29 contributing and non-contributing buildings. Notable buildings include the Coolidge Hotel, the First National Bank building, a U.S. Post Office building, and the White River Junction Fire House, showing examples of Greek Revival, Colonial Revival, Richardsonian Romanesque, Italianate, and Romanesque architecture.

== History ==
The village has long had a role in transportation, primarily as a railroad junction. From the arrival of the first railroads in the late 1840s until rail diminished in importance in the 1950s and 1960s, White River Junction was the most important railroad community in Vermont. Its original importance was due to its location at the confluence of the White River with the Connecticut River. In 1803 Elias Lyman built a bridge across the Connecticut from the north bank of the White River to West Lebanon, New Hampshire.

The local population remained quite low until the arrival of the railroad in the 1840s. Five different railroad lines were laid through the village site between 1847 and 1863 (the Vermont Central Railway and Connecticut River Railroad in 1847, the Connecticut and Passumpsic Rivers Railroad in 1848, the Northern New Hampshire Railroad in 1849, and the Woodstock Railroad in 1863), creating an eight-track crossing that was served by 50 passenger trains daily. In 1849, the village's first railroad depot was built, and local farmer Samuel Nutt arranged to buy and dismantle a hotel in Enfield, New Hampshire, and move it to his farm on the other side of the railroad tracks from the depot. His hotel, named the Junction House, was the first of three hotels to occupy the site, which now is home to the Coolidge Hotel, built in 1924.

White River Junction hosted the annual Vermont State Fair from the mid-19th century until the mid-20th century. A special rail spur carried visitors uphill from the station to the fairgrounds.

== Geography ==
According to the United States Census Bureau, the village has a total area of 1.7 square miles (4.4 km^{2}), of which 1.6 square miles (4.3 km^{2}) is land and 0.1 square miles (0.1 km^{2}) (2.94%) is water.

The village takes its name from the White River, which joins with the Connecticut River there.

The village is only a five-minute drive from Hanover, New Hampshire, which hosts Dartmouth College and nearly equidistant from major cities and towns such as Rutland, Montpelier, St. Johnsbury, Brattleboro, Keene, and Concord.

== Demographics ==
As of the census of 2000, there were 2,569 people, 1,169 households, and 648 families residing in the village. The population density was 1,557.6 per square mile (601.1/km^{2}). There were 1,235 housing units at an average density of 748.8 per square mile (289.0/km^{2}). The racial makeup of the village was 96.54% (2,480) White, 0.58% (14) African American, 0.43% (11) Native American, 0.70% (17) Asian, 0.04% (1) from other races, and 1.71% (43) from two or more races. Hispanic or Latino of any race were 0.58% of the population.

There were 1,169 households, out of which 28.1% had children under the age of 18 living with them, 38.0% were married couples living together, 13.4% had a female householder with no husband present, and 44.5% were non-families. 36.9% of all households were made up of individuals, and 15.7% had someone living alone who was 65 years of age or older. The average household size was 2.19 and the average family size was 2.86.

In the village, the population was spread out, with 24.3% under the age of 18, 7.3% from 18 to 24, 29.9% from 25 to 44, 23.3% from 45 to 64, and 15.3% who were 65 years of age or older. The median age was 38 years. For every 100 females, there were 89.0 males. For every 100 females age 18 and over, there were 86.8 males.

The median income for a household in the village was $33,667, and the median income for a family was $44,094. Males had a median income of $34,200 versus $21,591 for females. The per capita income for the village was $17,221. About 8.1% of families and 11.6% of the population were below the poverty line, including 17.0% of those under age 18 and 4.7% of those age 65 or over.

== Culture ==
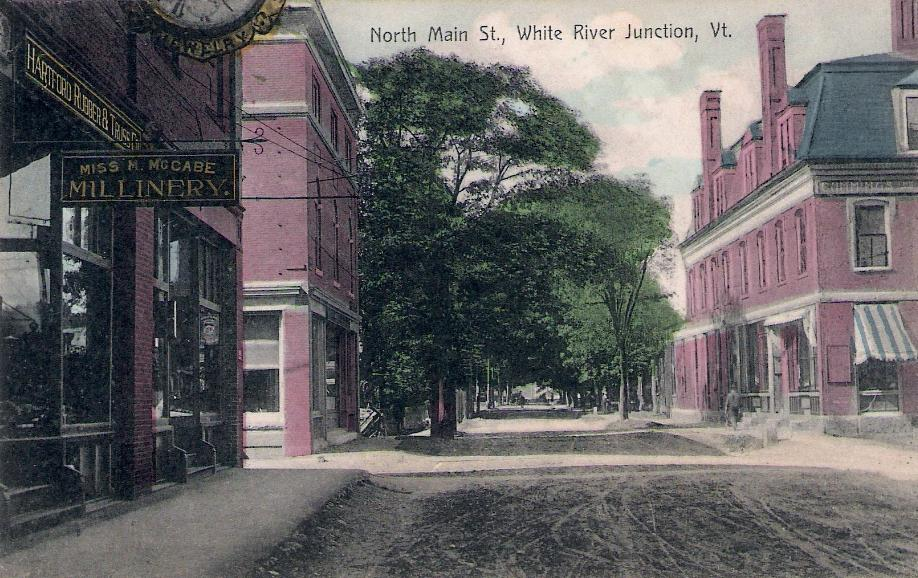
North Main Street c. 1908

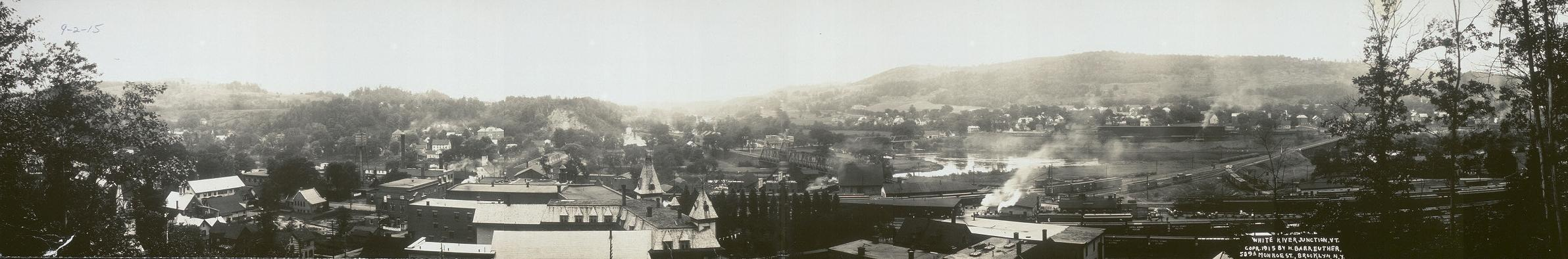
White River Junction in 1915

White River Junction served as the location for the filming of director D.W. Griffith's film Way Down East, in part filmed on the ice floes of the Connecticut and White rivers, starring Lillian Gish and Richard Barthelmess. While filming, both cast and crew lodged at the Hotel Coolidge (then the Junction House). After 1950, important murals were painted on the walls of this hotel by Peter Gish. One of these, saying simply "ROOM WITH BATH" and a large arrow, has become a bit of a landmark. S. Douglas Crockwell painted a mural, Vermont Industries, in the post office in 1937. Federally commissioned murals were produced from 1934 to 1943 in the United States through the Section of Painting and Sculpture, later called the Section of Fine Arts, of the Treasury Department.

Hotel Coolidge, renovated in 1997, now operates as a 30-room hotel and a 26-bed youth hostel by Hostelling International USA. The 1920s structure once served as a railway hotel. The hotel is said to be haunted by the ghost of Ezra "Wrench" Magoon, a farmer and known bootlegger who died in the Hotel Coolidge in the summer of 1918.

White River Junction is home to the Center for Cartoon Studies, a 2-year art school focusing on sequential art.

It is also home to the Tip Top Building, a renovated 45,000-square-foot (4,200 m^{2}) bakery that houses artists, creative businesses and a cafe.

The Main Street Museum, described by the Washington Post as a "blastfighter,"is an eclectic display space for material culture and an experiment in a new taxonomy. It makes its home in White River Junction's former fire station on Bridge Street, next to the underpass.

White River Junction is home to Northern Stage, a professional regional theatre. It is also home to The Writers' Center, which offers classes and workshops to the local writing community.

== Transportation ==
=== Roads and highways ===
White River Junction is crossed by:

- I-89
- I-91
- US 4 (Crossroad of Vermont Byway)
- US 5 (Connecticut River Byway)
- VT 14

To take advantage of the village's location as one of Vermont's busiest junctions, and as the place where the state's two major Interstate highways meet, several chain hotels have been built in the area.

=== Rail ===
Amtrak, the national passenger rail system, provides daily service through White River Junction, operating its Vermonter between Washington, D.C., and St. Albans, Vermont. White River Junction was formerly an important junction on the Boston & Maine Railroad's Connecticut River Line. White River Junction also serves as a major stop along the Green Mountain Railroad for the White River Flyer train.

=== Bus ===
Greyhound, the national intercity bus system, provides daily service to and from White River Junction from a terminal on the corner of US Route 5 and Sykes Mountain Road. Two of their lines serve this station, one between Montreal and Boston, with northbound stops including Montpelier, Burlington and Burlington International Airport, and southbound stops including Concord, NH, Manchester, NH, and Manchester-Boston Regional Airport. The other represents the northern terminus of a line to New York City. Premier Coach's Vermont Translines, as part of a partnership with Greyhound, also stops there on its route between Rutland and Lebanon, New Hampshire. Service on this route began on June 9, 2014.

Advance Transit provides local bus transportation in and around the White River Junction area. All routes are fare free and run all week long.

== Education ==
White River Junction is in the Hartford School District, and is home to four of the seven Hartford School District schools, and the only high school in the district, them being White River Elementary, Hartford Memorial Middle School, Hartford High School, and the HACTC.

Mid Vermont Christian School, a private K-12 school, has a White River Junction postal address, but is physically in Quechee.

== Notable people ==
- Jim Cantore, The Weather Channel meteorologist
- Cayetano Garza, comic artist, cartoonist and illustrator
- James Sturm, comic artist and founder/director of the Center for Cartoon Studies
