= Vermont Agency of Transportation =

Government agency in Vermont, United States

Vermont Agency of Transportation (VTrans)

Agency overview
- Preceding agencies: Vermont Highway Department; Vermont Department of Aeronautics; Vermont Department of Motor Vehicles; Vermont Department of Public Transit
- Jurisdiction: Vermont
- Headquarters: Barre City Place; 219 N. Main Street; Barre, Vermont
- Employees: 1270+
- Agency executives: Joe Flynn, Secretary of Transportation; Wanda Minoli, Commissioner of Motor Vehicles
- Parent agency: State of Vermont
- Website: Vtrans.vermont.gov

The Vermont Agency of Transportation (VTrans) is a government agency of the U.S. state of Vermont that is responsible for planning, constructing, and maintaining a variety of transportation infrastructure in the state. This includes roads, bridges, state-owned railroads, airports, park and ride facilities, bicycle facilities, pedestrian paths, public transportation facilities and services, and Department of Motor Vehicles operations and motor carrier enforcement.

== Responsibility ==
The federal government has provided most of the money to construct federal (Class I) highways but the state has the responsibility to maintain them. The state, in turn, builds state (Class II) roads and it is up to the local towns and municipalities to maintain them.

== History ==
The Vermont State Highway Commission was established in 1892. A six-year study by the commission led to the establishment of state funding for the construction of new roads in 1898. A new State Highway Board was created in 1921 consisting of the governor and two appointed officials. Two years later, the board created the Department of Highways. In 1960, several organizations including the Commissioner of Highways, the State Highway Board, and the Board of Public Works were merged into the Department of Highways. In 1973, a Transportation Advisory Board was established and tasked with assessing all existing transportation organizations and developing a ten-year plan for state transportation. From the recommendations of the board, a new Agency of Transportation was created as the central authority of transportation in Vermont in 1975. The new agency was headed by a seven-member Transportation Board. Changes in leadership structure, divisions, and committees in 1986 established the agency as it currently stands.

== Structure ==
The agency divides the state into four regions: Northwest, Northeast, Southwest, and Southeast. Each region is further divided into two maintenance districts. Each maintenance district has a district headquarters. The agency's main headquarters serves an additional district, for a total of nine districts statewide. The agency employs 1,300 people and is divided into three main divisions and an associated department. They are:

=== Highway Division ===
The Highway Division is primarily responsible for the construction and maintenance of Vermont's road system. Its tasks also include installing and maintaining signals, signs, and culverts, providing grants and support for municipal level projects, maintaining the agency's fleet of vehicles, providing safety training, and informing the public of road conditions.

=== Division of Policy, Planning, and Intermodal Development ===
The PPID oversees other means of transportation in the state. Railways, airports, and public transportation are under its supervision. It is also responsible for creating future plans and prioritizing projects. It collaborates with other councils and the general public. The Vermont operations of Amtrak's Ethan Allen Express and Vermonter receive financial support.

=== Division of Finance and Administration ===
This Division performs the administrative functions of the agency. Its tasks include negotiating contracts, information technology support, budget and accounting, auditing, compliance with labor laws, and hiring.

=== Department of Motor Vehicles ===
Although not considered a division of the agency, the Vermont DMV is associated with it. The agency assists with the enforcement of DMV policy. The main headquarters are in Montpelier and there are ten other offices throughout the state.

== Funding ==
In the 2020 fiscal year, the agency's total budget is $615.8 million. It includes $258 million from state transportation funding, $320 million in federal funding, $13.3 million from TIB Funds, and $24.5 million from other sources such as internal services and interdepartmental transfers. This has been appropriated as $33.2 million for the Department of Motor Vehicles, $447.7 million to the Highway Division for construction, maintenance, and municipal support, $15.5 million for Finance & Administration, and $89.2 million for Policy, Planning, and Intermodal Development.

== Controversy ==
VTrans applies a salt brine to roads to melt snow and ice. The brine has been suggested as a factor in increased corrosion of vehicles. The agency states that there is no evidence to prove this. Nevertheless, a bill was introduced in the Vermont legislature in 2017 to prevent and ban the use of salt brine in the entire state.

== See also ==
- List of state highways in Vermont
- Vehicle registration plates of Vermont
