= Frank Gaylord =

American sculptor (1925–2018)

- Born: Frank Chalfant Gaylord II; March 9, 1925; Clarksburg, West Virginia, U.S.
- Died: March 21, 2018 (aged 93); Northfield, Vermont, U.S.
- Resting place: Hope Cemetery, Barre, Vermont
- Education: Carnegie Institute of Technology, Temple University
- Known for: art, memorials
- Notable work: Korean War Veterans Memorial

Frank Chalfant Gaylord II (March 9, 1925 – March 21, 2018) was an American sculptor best known for "The Column", a sculptural tableau of United States soldiers and sailors which is part of the Korean War Veterans Memorial in Washington, D.C.

== Career ==
Gaylord was born in March 1925 to Richard and Thelma (Hamilton) Gaylord in Clarksburg, West Virginia. He was named for his grandfather, Frank C. Gaylord. He graduated from Washington Irving High School in Clarksburg.

Gaylord was drafted at the age of 18 into the United States Army. He served as a paratrooper in the 17th Airborne Division during World War II. He saw action in Africa, Europe, and the Middle East, and was awarded the Bronze Star Medal for fighting in the Battle of the Bulge. During this time, he sketched many of the men he served with in the military. He was wounded, and spent several months in military hospitals convalescing.

After being discharged from the Army at the end of the war, Gaylord attended the Carnegie Institute of Technology (now Carnegie Mellon University) in Pittsburgh, Pennsylvania. He transferred to the Tyler School of Art at Temple University, where he received his Bachelor of Fine Arts in 1950.

Gaylord and his wife moved to Barre, Vermont, in 1951. Interested in a career in sculpting granite, Gaylord apprenticed under noted Vermont sculptor Bruno Sarzanini.

Early in his career, Gaylord carved tombstones. Over time, he received numerous commissions for life-sized and larger-than-life representational figures and figure groups throughout the United States and Canada. In 1989 Frank became partners with his son-in-law John Triano. John ran the business and Frank was able to focus on the art. In 1990, Gaylord was selected to sculpt a field of 38 soldiers (later reduced to 19) for the Korean War Veterans Memorial in Washington, D.C. Some of the faces of the sculptures he created for the work (known as "The Column") are drawn from men he served with during World War II, including William A. Callaway and John Erdman.

=== Copyright infringement lawsuit against USPS ===
In 2002, the United States Postal Service used a photograph of Gaylord's soldier sculptures for a stamp commemorating the Korean War. Gaylord sued for copyright infringement in 2006. The United States Court of Federal Claims denied his claim, but this was overturned by the United States Court of Appeals for the Federal Circuit in Gaylord v. United States, 595 F.3d 1364 (Fed. Cir. 2010). On remand, the Court of Federal Claims awarded Gaylord $5,000 in compensation. But on appeal, the Court of Appeals for the Federal Circuit again vacated the decision and remanded the case back to the Court of Federal Claims for a new determination of damages based on what Gaylord and the Postal Service might have negotiated. On September 20, 2013, The United States Court of Federal Claims awarded Gaylord damages of $684,845 (equivalent to $946,554 in 2025).

== Personal life and honors ==
Gaylord was married to Mary Cornwell. The couple had three children, Leanne Gaylord Triano and Victoria Gaylord. Also, his son, John Richard Gaylord died in 1962. He has two grandchildren, Amy Triano Tefft M.D., her husband Cory, his great granddaughters Quinn Nicole Tefft, Isabel Mary Tefft, great grandsons Theodore John Tefft, Henry Hart Tefft, and grandson John Gaylord Triano. Gaylord worked in a 7,000 square feet (650 m^{2}) studio in Barre, Vermont.

Gaylord was honored for his work several times. These recognitions include an honorary doctorate from Norwich University in Northfield, Vermont, in 1998 and the Governor's Award from the Vermont Council on the Arts in 2003.

Gaylord died at the Northfield, Vermont home of his daughter and son in law on March 21, 2018. He was 93. He was buried in the Hope Cemetery in Barre, Vermont.

== Notable works ==
This is a partial list of Gaylord's works which have received public notice:

- Governor Thomas Chittenden (Montpelier, Vermont)
- Christopher Columbus (Waterbury, Connecticut) – decapitated in July 2020 amid protests in Connecticut over the murder of George Floyd.
- President Calvin Coolidge (Amherst College, Amherst, Massachusetts)
- Arthur Fiedler (Mugar Memorial Library, Boston University, Boston, Massachusetts)
- Governor Ella T. Grasso (Hartford, Connecticut)
- General Ernest N. Harmon (Norwich University, Northfield, Vermont)
- Heart to Heart (also known as the Policemen's Memorial) (Jacksonville, Florida)
- Grizzly Bear (York, Pennsylvania)
- I Got It! (Fifth Third Field, Toledo, Ohio)
- Little League Monument (Williamsport, Pennsylvania)
- William Penn (Penn Treaty Park, Philadelphia, Pennsylvania)
- Pioneer Family (Akron, Ohio)
- William Shakespeare (Old Globe Theatre, San Diego, California)
- United States Korean War Memorial, United Nations Memorial Cemetery, Busan, South Korea – carved from Barre Granite at the Rock of Ages Corporation in Barre, Vermont, and dedicated under the auspices of the American Battle Monuments Commission in 2013.
