= Barre granite =

Variety of Vermont granite

Coordinates: 44°9′8″N 72°29′2″W

- Stratigraphic range: Devonian
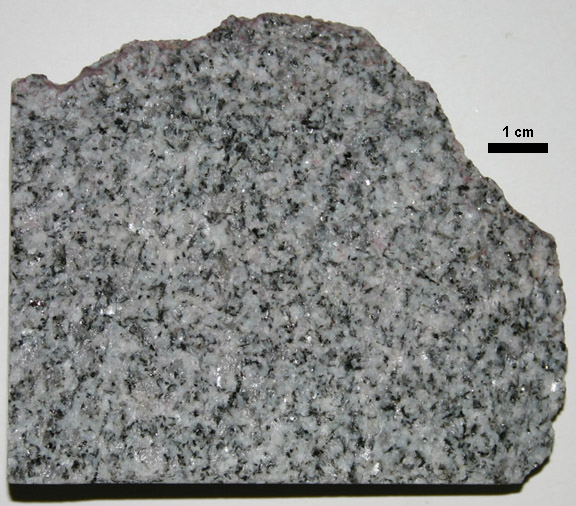
- Barre granite
- Type: igneous

Lithology
- Primary: granite

Location
- Region: New England
- Extent: Vermont

Type section
- Named for: Barre Township, Washington County, Vermont
- Named by: C. H. Richardson, 1902

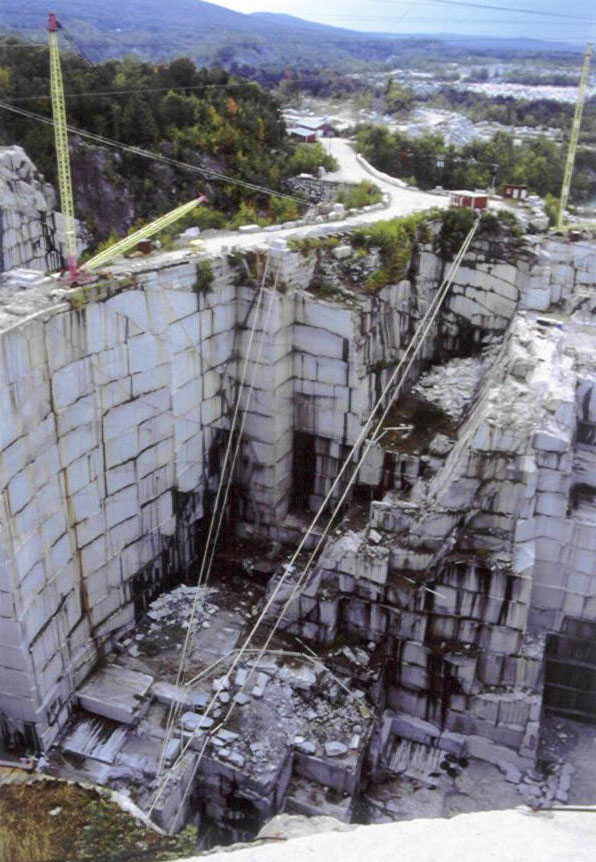
The E. L. Smith Quarry, where the Barre Granite is mined

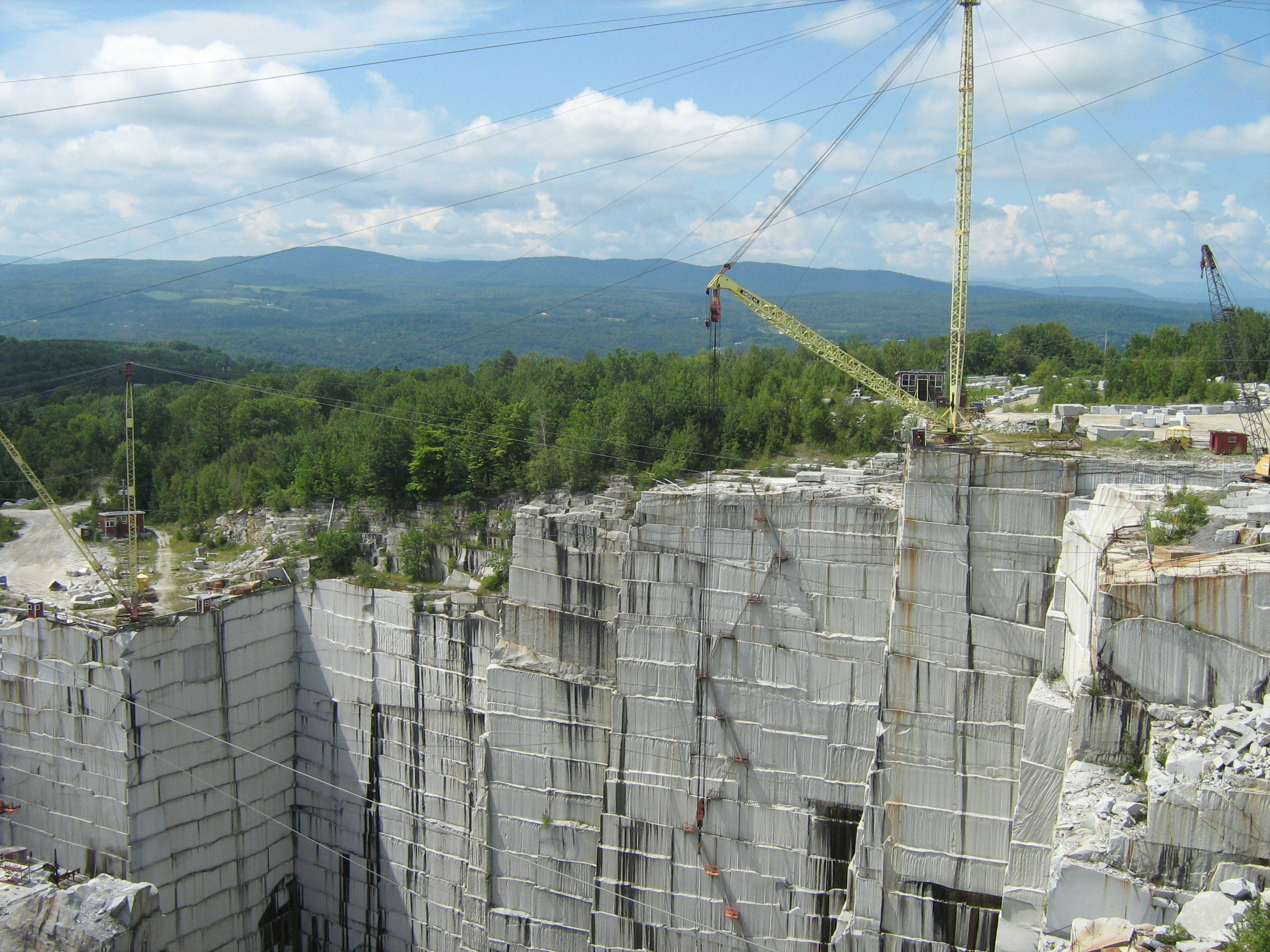
Another view of the quarry

Barre granite /ˈbæri/ is a Devonian granite pluton near the town of Barre in Washington County, Vermont. Richardson described it as a "fine granite, composed of quartz, feldspar, and mica. The mica is both muscovite and biotite." It intrudes into the Waits River Formation.

== Building and sculpting stone ==
The granite is mined at the E. L. Smith Quarry, the world's largest "deep hole" granite quarry, owned by the Rock of Ages Corporation. All of the stones in the Hope Cemetery in neighboring city of Barre are made with Barre granite. "Barre Grey" granite is sought after worldwide for its fine grain, even texture, and superior weather resistance.

Many sculpture artists prefer it for indoor sculpture. Sculptor Frank Gaylord used it for the United States Korean War Memorial at the United Nations Memorial Cemetery, Busan, South Korea.
