= Barre, Vermont =

Barre, Vermont may refer to:

- Barre (city), Vermont
- Barre (town), Vermont
