= Websterville, Vermont =

Census-designated place in Vermont, United States

- Census-designated place
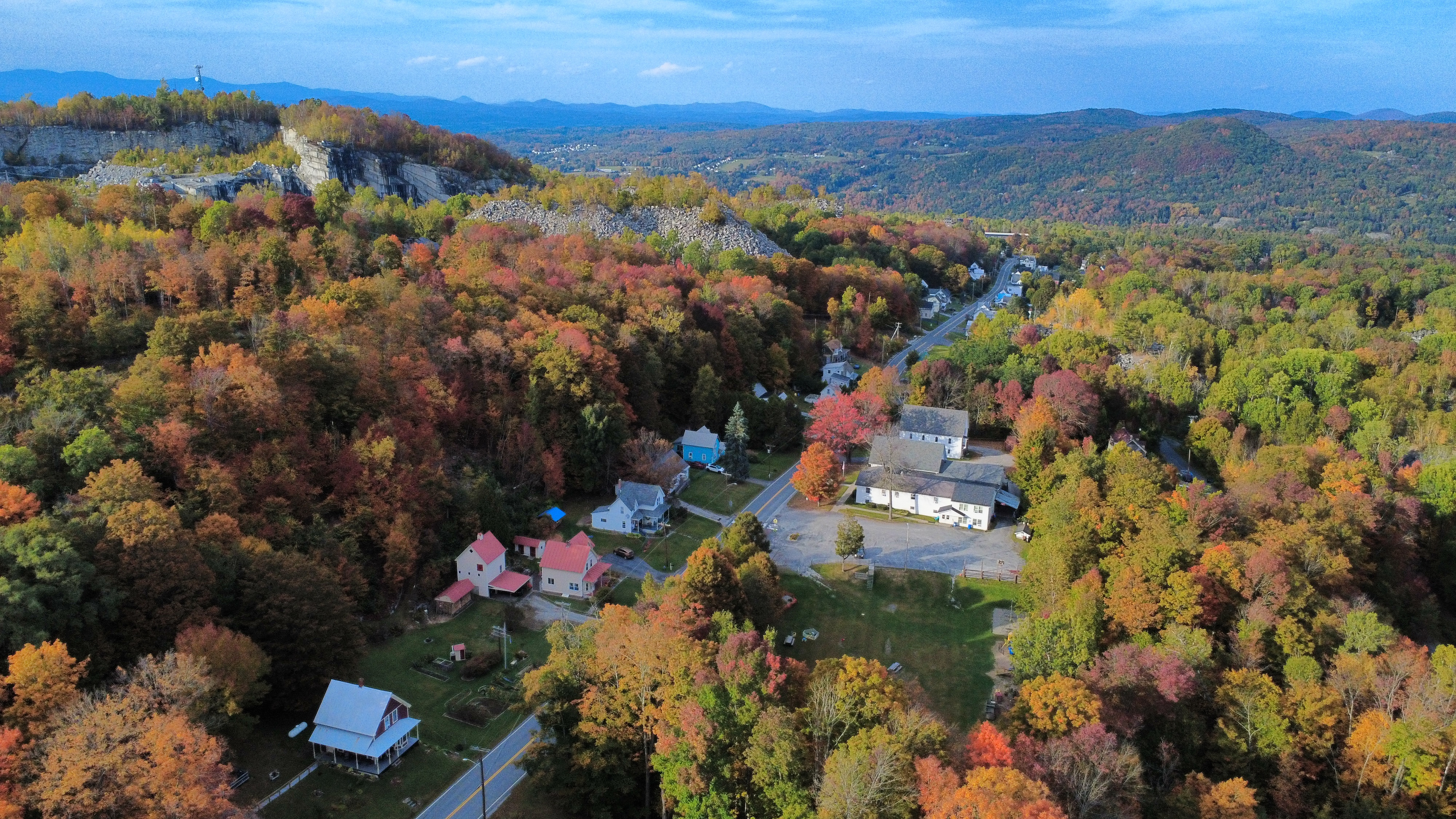
- Websterville, VT, from the south

- Location in Washington County and the state of Vermont
- Coordinates: 44°09′42″N 72°28′24″W
- Country: United States
- State: Vermont
- County: Washington

Area
  - Total: 1.7 sq mi (4.4 km^{2})
  - Land: 1.7 sq mi (4.3 km^{2})
  - Water: 0.039 sq mi (0.1 km^{2})
- Elevation: 1,247 ft (380 m)

Population (2010)
  - Total: 550
  - Density: 330/sq mi (130/km^{2})
- Time zone: UTC-5 (Eastern (EST))
  - Summer (DST): UTC-4 (EDT)
- ZIP Codes: 05678 (Websterville); 05641 (Barre)
- Area code: 802
- FIPS code: 50-77800
- GNIS feature ID: 2584794

Websterville is a census-designated place (CDP) in the town of Barre, Washington County, Vermont, United States. As of the 2020 census, Websterville had a population of 570. Prior to 2010, it was part of the Graniteville-East Barre CDP, which consisted of three unincorporated villages in the town: Graniteville, East Barre, and Websterville.

== Geography ==
According to the United States Census Bureau, the Websterville CDP has a total area of 1.7 square miles (4.4 km^{2}), of which 1.7 square miles (4.3 km^{2}) is land and 0.04 square miles (0.1 km^{2}), or 2.68%, is water.
