= Nichols House (East Barre, Vermont) =

Historic house in Vermont, United States

- U.S. National Register of Historic Places
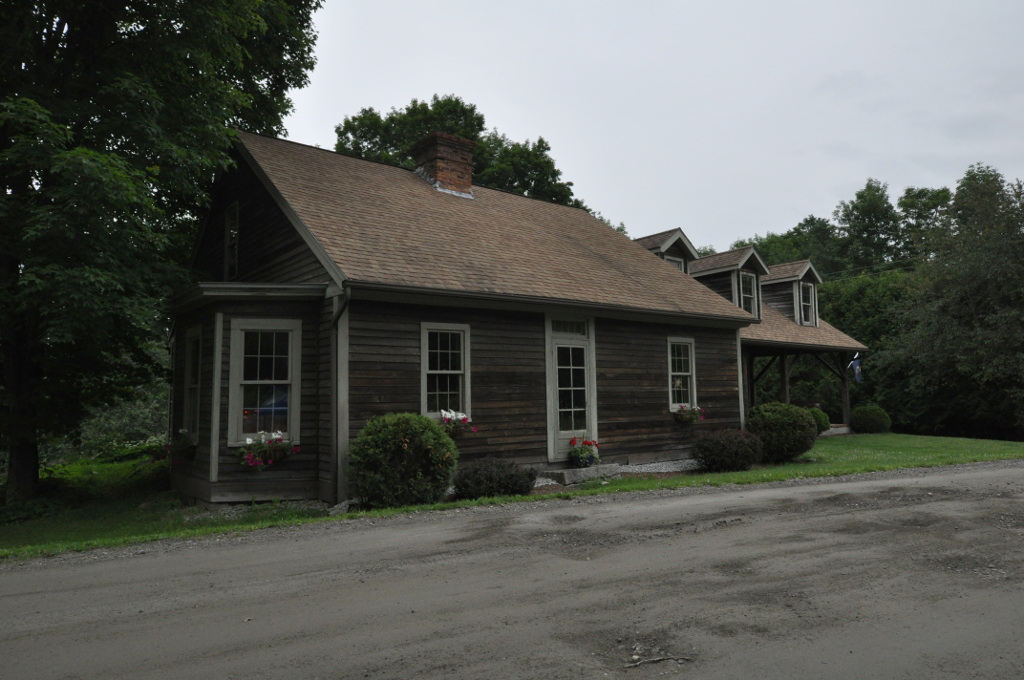

- Location within Vermont Location within the United States
- Location: Little John Rd. at Waterman Rd., East Barre, Vermont
- Coordinates: 44°8′59″N 72°27′31″W
- Area: 2 acres (0.81 ha)
- Built: 1799
- Architectural style: Greek Revival, Cape Cod
- NRHP reference No.: 78000247
- Added to NRHP: January 31, 1978

The Nichols House is a historic house at the junction of Little John and Waterman Roads, south of the East Barre village of the town of Barre, Vermont. Built in 1799, it is one of the Barre area's oldest surviving buildings, built by one of the town's first settlers. It was listed on the National Register of Historic Places in 1978.

== Description and history ==
The Nichols House stands in a rural area of eastern Barre, on the northern corner of the four-way junction of Little John, Waterman, Donahue, and Lowery Roads. The house is oriented facing southwest toward Little John Road. It is a 1 1/2-story wood-frame Cape-style house with a gabled roof, central chimney, and clapboarded exterior. Its main facade has three bays with a central entrance flanked by sash windows. The molding surrounding the doors and windows is simple, and the only significant architectural note is the four-light transom window above the entrance. A modern ell, also 1 1/2 stories, extends to the right, stepped back from the main block.

Thomas Nichols moved with his family to the Barre area in 1799 from Worcester, Massachusetts, and built this house. He died the following year, leaving his seventeen-year-old son as head of the household. The house remained in the family until at least the late 19th century. It is an extremely rare example of a vernacular pre-Greek Revival house in the Barre-Montpelier area.

== See also ==
- National Register of Historic Places listings in Washington County, Vermont
