= Graniteville-East Barre, Vermont =

- Former CDP
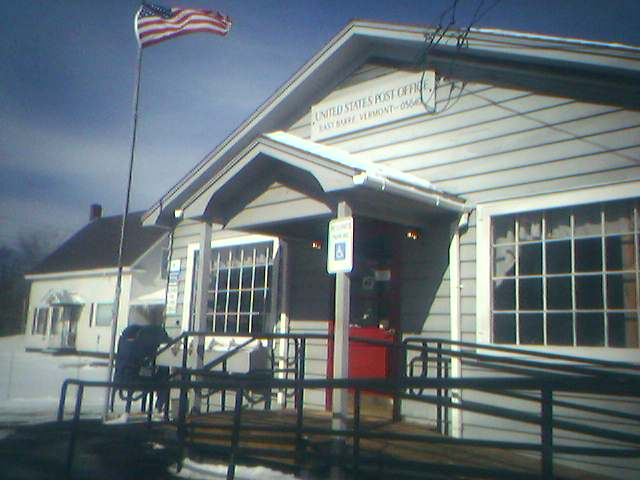
- Post office in East Barre
- Interactive map of Graniteville-East Barre, Vermont
- Coordinates: 44°9′32″N 72°28′5″W
- Country: United States
- State: Vermont
- County: Washington

Area
  - Total: 7.0 sq mi (18.1 km^{2})
  - Land: 6.9 sq mi (18.0 km^{2})
  - Water: 0 sq mi (0.0 km^{2})

Population (2000)
  - Total: 2,136
  - Density: 307/sq mi (118.5/km^{2})
- Time zone: UTC-5 (Eastern (EST))
  - Summer (DST): UTC-4 (EDT)
- ZIP code: 05649 (East Barre), 05654 (Graniteville)
- Area code: 802
- FIPS code: 50-29450

Graniteville-East Barre is a former census-designated place (CDP) defined for the 2000 census in the town of Barre, Washington County, Vermont, United States. The population of the CDP was 2,136 at the 2000 census. The CDP consisted of three unincorporated villages in the town: Graniteville, East Barre, and Websterville. For the 2010 census, the three areas have been split into separate CDPs in accordance with the 2010 criterion of not aggregating multiple places into one CDP.

== Geography ==
According to the United States Census Bureau, the CDP had a total area of 18.1 km^{2} (7.0 sq mi), of which 18.0 km^{2} (6.9 sq mi) was land and 0.1 km^{2} (0.039 sq mi) (0.29%) was water.

== Demographics ==
As of the census of 2000, there were 2,136 people, 843 households, and 599 families residing in the CDP. The population density was 118.5 people /km^{2} (307 people/mi^{2}). There were 880 housing units at an average density of 48.8 units /km^{2} (126 units/mi^{2}). The racial makeup of the CDP was 97.57% White, 0.23% African American, 0.14% Native American, 0.42% Asian, 0.33% from other races, and 1.31% from two or more races. Hispanic or Latino of any race were 1.73% of the population.

There were 843 households, out of which 33.9% had children under the age of 18 living with them, 55.4% were couples living together and joined in either marriage or civil union, 11.6% had a female householder with no husband present, and 28.9% were non-families. 22.7% of all households were made up of individuals, and 10.1% had someone living alone who was 65 years of age or older. The average household size was 2.53 and the average family size was 2.93.

In the CDP the population was spread out, with 25.9% under the age of 18, 7.4% from 18 to 24, 30.3% from 25 to 44, 21.8% from 45 to 64, and 14.7% who were 65 years of age or older. The median age was 37 years. For every 100 females, there were 91.7 males. For every 100 females age 18 and over, there were 91.1 males.

The median income for a household in the CDP was $36,488, and the median income for a family was $40,069. Males had a median income of $26,385 versus $22,284 for females. The per capita income for the CDP was $16,153. About 7.4% of families and 8.4% of the population were below the poverty line, including 15.5% of those under age 18 and 1.4% of those age 65 or over.
