= Graniteville, Vermont =

Census-designated place in Vermont, United States

- Census-designated place
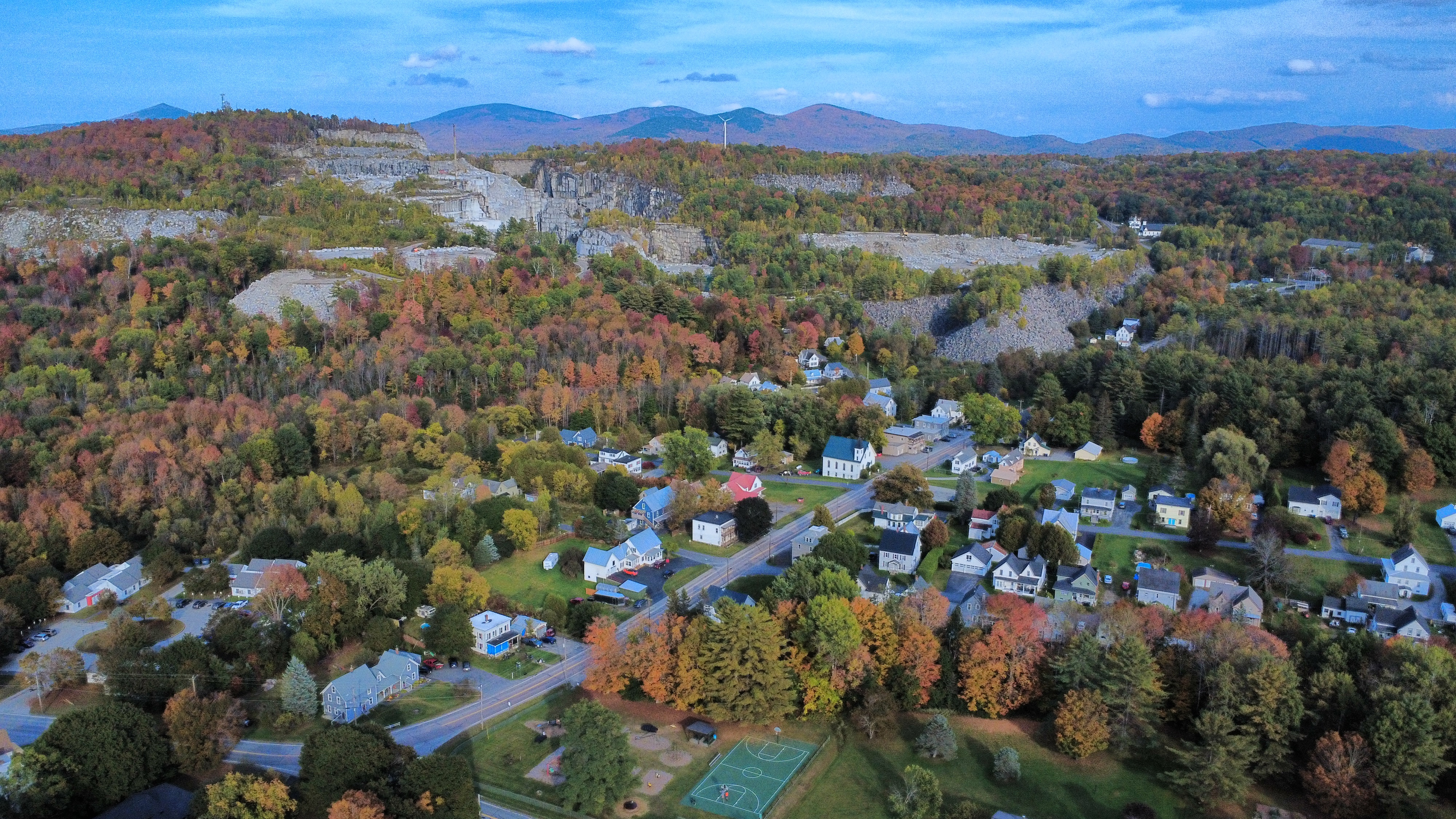
- Graniteville, VT, from the southwest

- Location in Washington County and the state of Vermont
- Coordinates: 44°08′57″N 72°29′32″W
- Country: United States
- State: Vermont
- County: Washington

Area
  - Total: 1.7 sq mi (4.5 km^{2})
  - Land: 1.7 sq mi (4.4 km^{2})
  - Water: 0.039 sq mi (0.1 km^{2})
- Elevation: 1,378 ft (420 m)

Population (2010)
  - Total: 784
  - Density: 460/sq mi (180/km^{2})
- Time zone: UTC-5 (Eastern (EST))
  - Summer (DST): UTC-4 (EDT)
- ZIP code: 05654
- Area code: 802
- FIPS code: 50-29425
- GNIS feature ID: 2584790

Graniteville is a census-designated place (CDP) in the town of Barre, Washington County, Vermont, United States. As of the 2020 census, Graniteville had a population of 717. Prior to 2010, it was part of the Graniteville-East Barre CDP, which consisted of three unincorporated villages in the town: Graniteville, East Barre, and Websterville.

Graniteville is home to the Rock of Ages granite company and the E. L. Smith Quarry, the world's largest deep hole granite quarry.

== Geography ==
According to the United States Census Bureau, the Graniteville CDP has a total area of 1.7 square miles (4.5 km^{2}), of which 1.7 square miles (4.4 km^{2}) is land and 0.04 square miles (0.1 km^{2}), or 1.94%, is water.
