= Quarry Workers' International Union of North America =

QUIUNA
- Quarry Workers' International Union of North America
- Merged into: United Steel Workers of America
- Founded: 1903
- Dissolved: 1971
- Headquarters: Barre, Vermont
- Location: United States, Canada
- Key people: Fred W. Suitor
- Affiliations: American Federation of Labor

The Quarry Workers' International Union of North America was a trade union with its headquarters in Barre, Vermont.

== History ==
The union was chartered by the American Federation of Labor on September 8, 1903. It was the merger of two smaller, AFL-affiliated unions. The Quarrymen's National Union of the United States of America' operated from 1890 to 1900 and the National State Quarrymen's Union from 1895 to 1898.

In 1938, it withdrew from the AFL and joined the Congress of Industrial Organizations (CIO). Three years later, it renamed itself the United Stone and Allied Products Workers of America (USAPWA). In 1955, it became a founding member of the AFL–CIO. After years of decline, it merged with the United Steel Workers of America in 1971.

The union's papers (1906-1914) are held by the Walter P. Reuther Library at Wayne State University.

== Notable people ==
- Fred W. Suitor, the organization's Secretary-Treasurer from 1911-1930, was a member of the Socialist Party of America and served as mayor of Barre from 1929-1931.

=== Presidents ===
C. J. Allen
Joseph F. Daly
John M. MacCauley
1935: John C. Lawson
Cecil V. Crawford
1942: H. C. Ledyard
1946: Sam H. Scott
c.1970: James P. Kurtz
