= Robert Gordon (Vermont politician) =

American politician

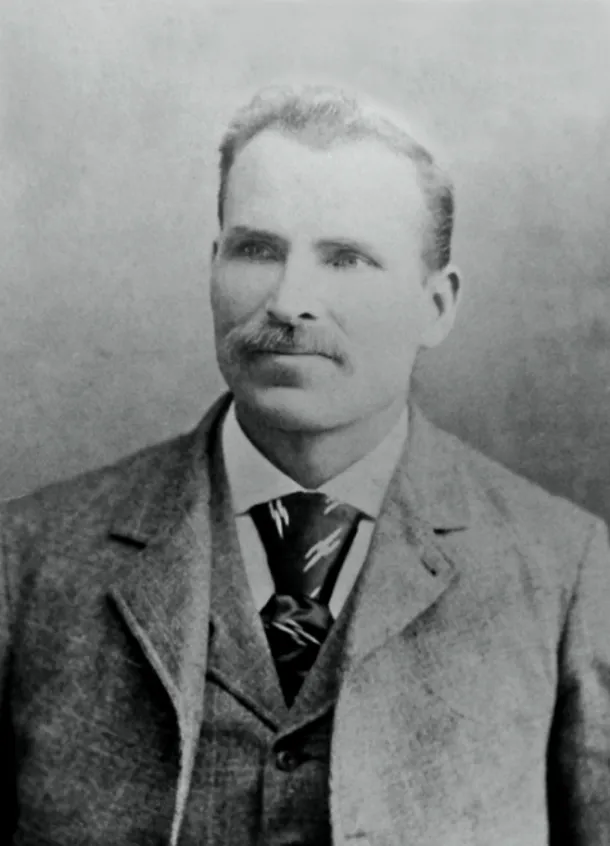

Mayor of Barre
- In office 1916–1917

Personal details
- Born: 1865; Aberdeenshire, Scotland
- Died: November 1, 1921 (aged 56); Lynn, Massachusetts, U.S.
- Occupation: Stonecutter and politician

Robert Gordon (1865 – November 1, 1921) was an American politician from Vermont. He served as mayor of Barre, Vermont from 1916 to 1917 and was the first socialist elected in the state. In his inaugural address, Gordon stressed the need to improve the health conditions of the workers in the city's vibrant quarrying industry, saying "Something has to be done to improve the health conditions in the granite sheds, for men are learning that high wages don’t mean much if you are down and out at fifty."

Gordon was born in Aberdeenshire, Scotland in 1865 and moved to Barre in 1880. Three years later at the age of 18, he became a stone-cutter. Between two marriages, Gordon had five children. Gordon and his family were actively involved in Barre's Scottish community. He first ran for mayor in 1912 and nearly won, except the city's Central Labor Union endorsed James Mutch, who was an independent and member of the influential Granite Cutters' International Association. Both Mutch and Gordon lost and Board of Trade chairman Lucius Thurston was elected mayor. Gordon was eventually elected mayor in 1916 alongside one other fellow Socialist. However, a conservative majority was elected to the Board of Alderman; Gordon's employer was elected chair of the board. After one term in office, in his policies were highly contested, Gordon retired from politics. Fellow Socialist Fred W. Suitor lost his bid to replace Gordon. Like other stone-cutters, Gordon suffered from ill-health and died of tuberculosis at the age of 56 at a Lynn, Massachusetts sanitarium.

In 1929, Suitor won the mayorship and became the second Socialist mayor of the city.

== See also ==
- List of elected socialist mayors in the United States
