= East Barre, Vermont =

Census-designated place in Vermont, United States

- Census-designated place
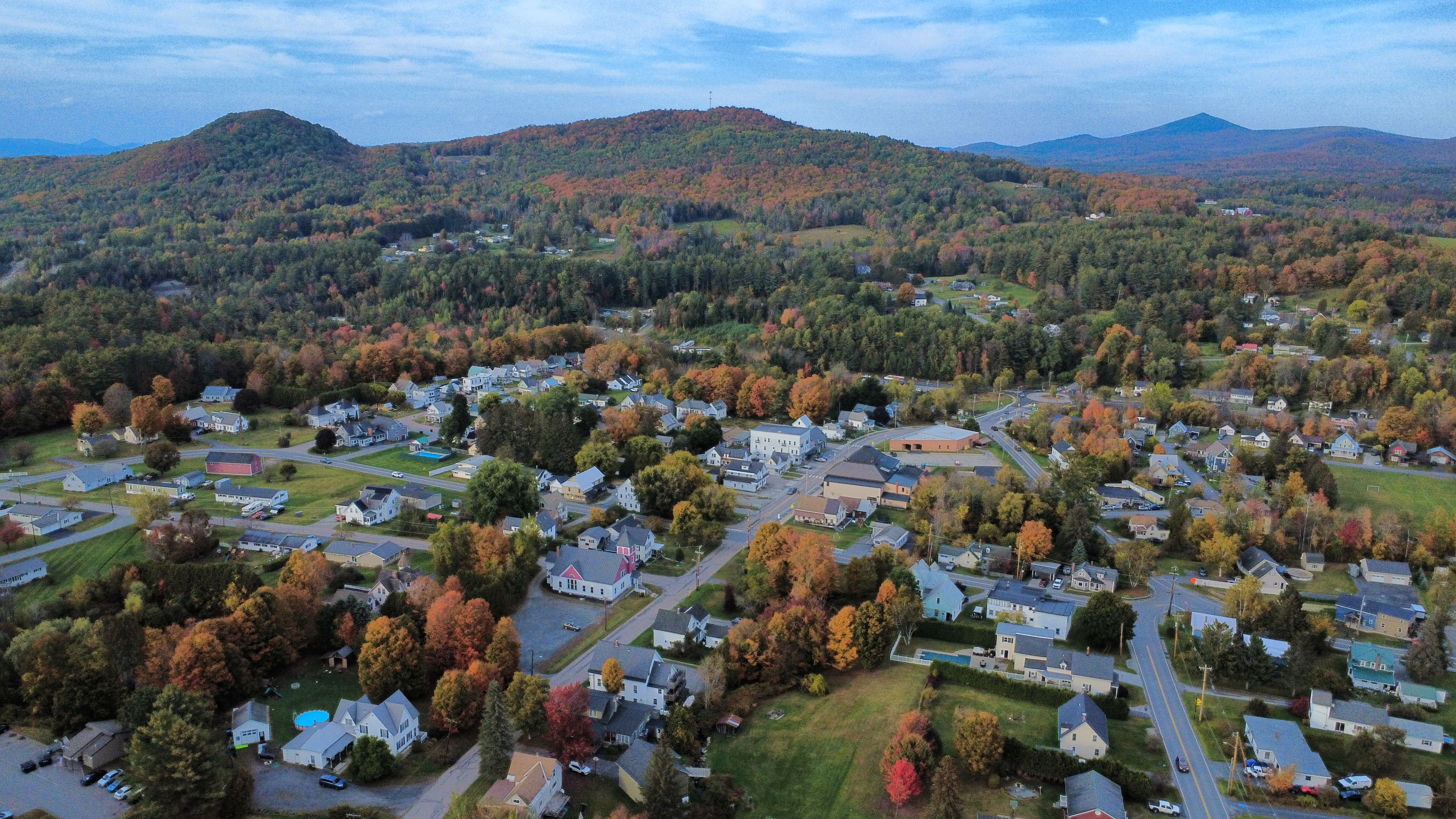
- East Barre, VT, from the southwest

- Location in Washington County and the state of Vermont
- Coordinates: 44°09′00″N 72°26′59″W
- Country: United States
- State: Vermont
- County: Washington

Area
  - Total: 2.69 sq mi (6.96 km^{2})
  - Land: 2.67 sq mi (6.92 km^{2})
  - Water: 0.015 sq mi (0.04 km^{2})
- Elevation: 1,135 ft (346 m)

Population (2010)
  - Total: 826
  - Density: 309/sq mi (119/km^{2})
- Time zone: UTC-5 (Eastern (EST))
  - Summer (DST): UTC-4 (EDT)
- ZIP Codes: 05649 (East Barre); 05641 (Barre)
- Area code: 802
- FIPS code: 50-19075
- GNIS feature ID: 2584788

East Barre is a census-designated place (CDP) in the town of Barre, Washington County, Vermont, United States. As of the 2020 census, East Barre had a population of 811. Prior to 2010, East Barre was part of the Graniteville-East Barre CDP, which consisted of three unincorporated villages in the town: Graniteville, East Barre, and Websterville.

== Geography ==
According to the United States Census Bureau, the East Barre CDP has a total area of 2.69 square miles (6.96 km^{2}), of which 2.67 square miles (6.92 km^{2}) is land and 0.015 square miles (0.04 km^{2}), or 0.52%, was water.
