= Hope Cemetery =

Cemetery in Barre, Washington County, Vermont

- Interactive map of Hope Cemetery

Details
- Established: 1895
- Location: Barre, Vermont
- Country: United States
- Coordinates: 44°12′40″N 72°29′59″W
- Type: Public
- Size: 65 acres (26 ha)
- Find a Grave: Hope Cemetery

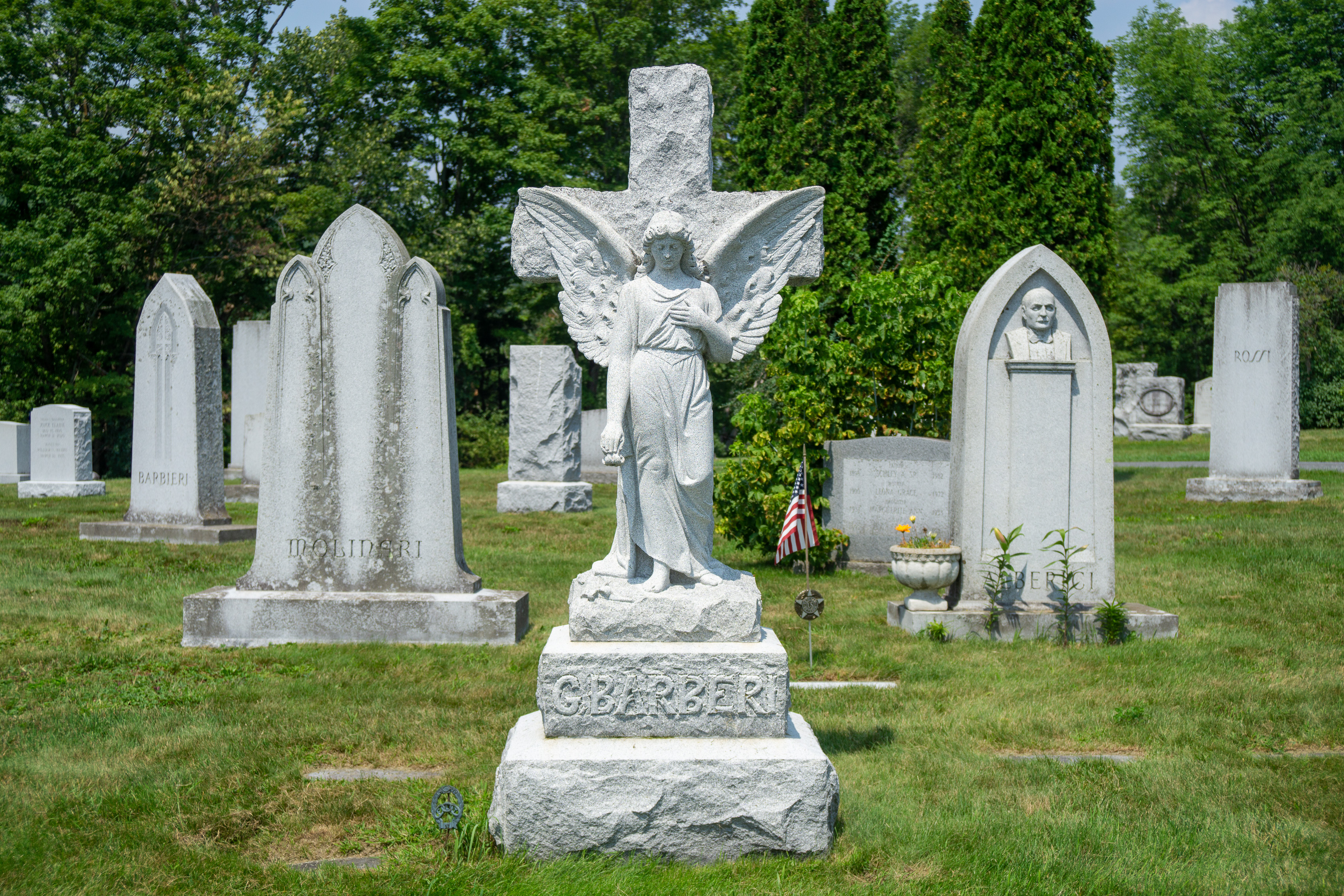
Hope Cemetery

Hope Cemetery is a rural cemetery in Barre, Vermont. The city calls itself the "Granite Capital of the World", and the cemetery is known for the superb granite craftsmanship on its memorials and tombstones.

== History ==
Hope Cemetery was established in 1895, with the purchase of 53 acres of farmland for $7,000. It was designed by the landscape architect Edward P. Adams. By 1895, skilled artisans from around the world, especially Italy, emigrated to Barre to participate in the booming granite industry. One of the main uses of granite throughout the country was in tombstones and memorials. It is estimated that one-third of all memorials in the United States came from Barre.

Silicosis, a respiratory disease caused by granite dust, was common among the artisans and sculptors who were breathing it in every day, which led to an abnormally high death rate. In addition, the 1918–1919 Spanish flu epidemic caused many additional deaths, adding to the need for tombstones. Knowing that death was imminent and possibly around the corner, many sculptors were given to designing their own tombstones to showcase their skill. It is estimated that 75% of the tombstones were designed by the occupants of the graves.

== Today ==
Hope Cemetery has since grown in size to 65 acres (26 ha), and there are more than 10,000 tombstones and memorials located inside. All of its stones are made from "Barre Grey" granite. The cemetery is a common tourist destination, and has been referred to as a "'Museum' of granite sculpture," the "Uffizi of Necropolises", by Vermont folklorist Joseph A. Citro, a "Gallery of granite artistry," a "sculpture garden" and a "Huge outdoor museum."

It is still possible for ornate and unusual tombstones to be put into Hope Cemetery. These large memorials can range in cost from US$20,000–30,000+. Simple headstones cost about $2,000.

Hope is the largest of three cemeteries managed by the city of Barre. It was featured in a story run by the Associated Press, and was also featured in a segment in National Geographic on cities and towns in America.

== Notable burials ==
- Frank Gaylord (1925–2018), sculptor

== Gallery ==
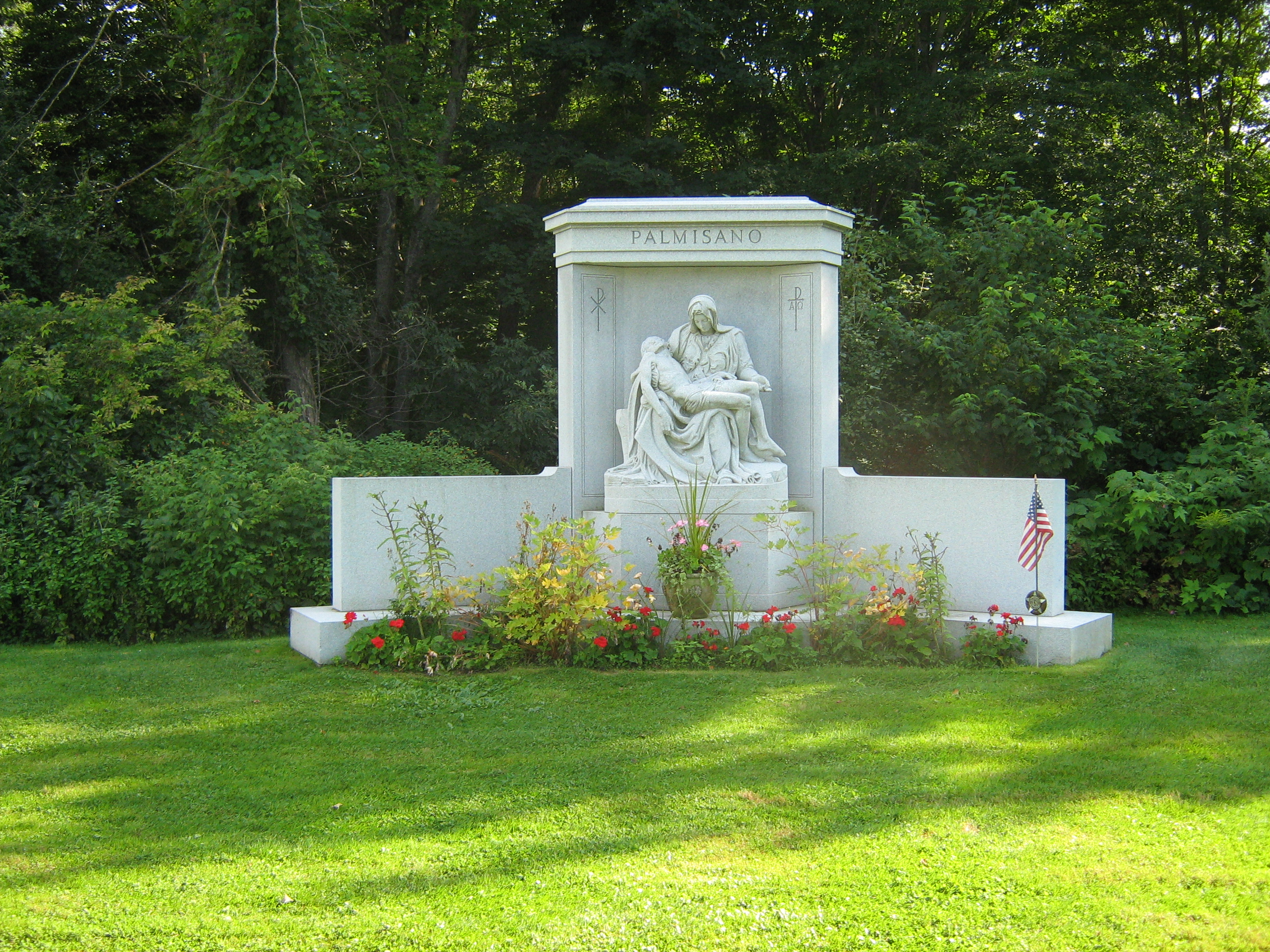
Gravestone with a reproduction of Michelangelo's Pietà.

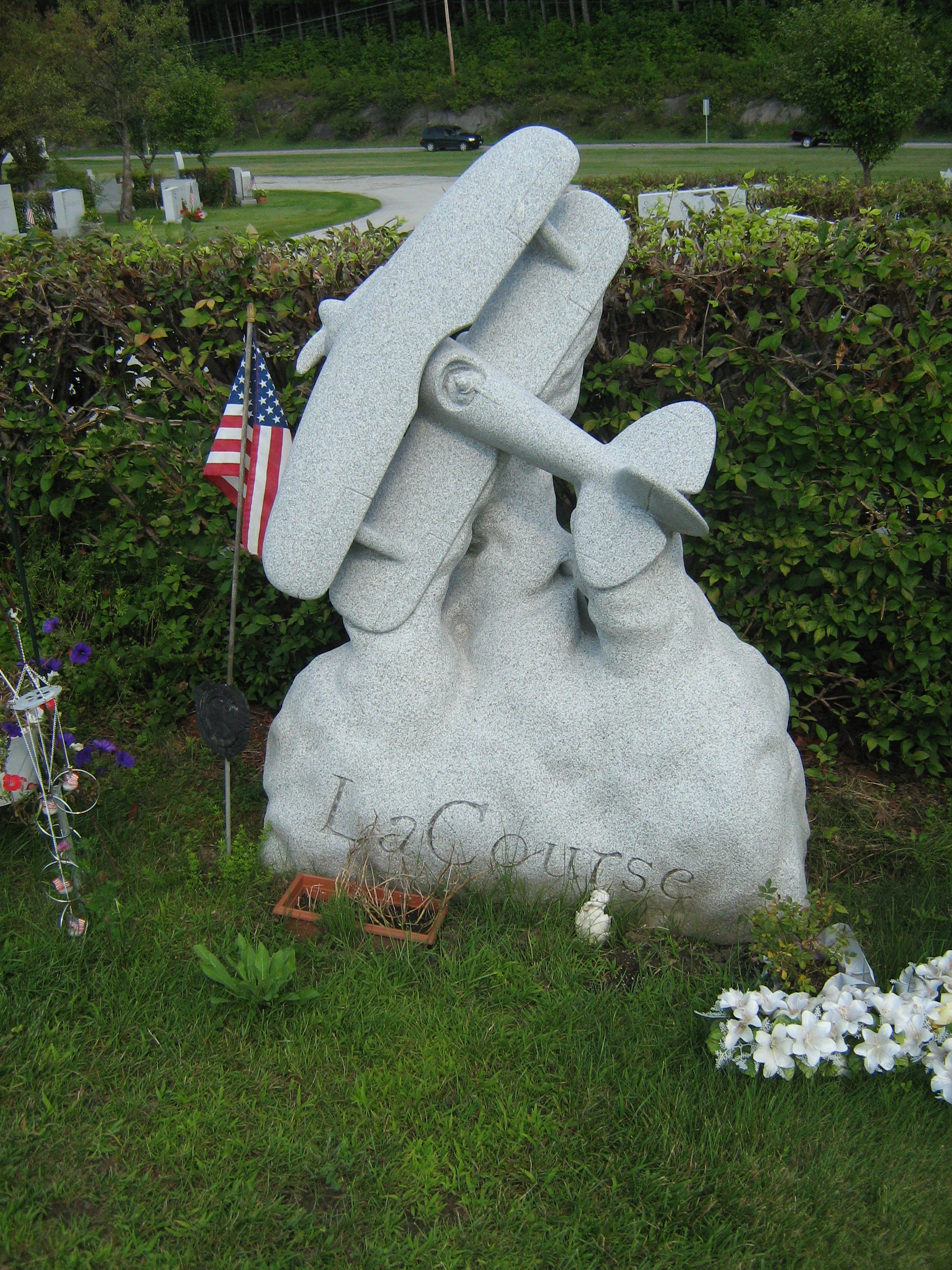
Gravestone of a pilot.

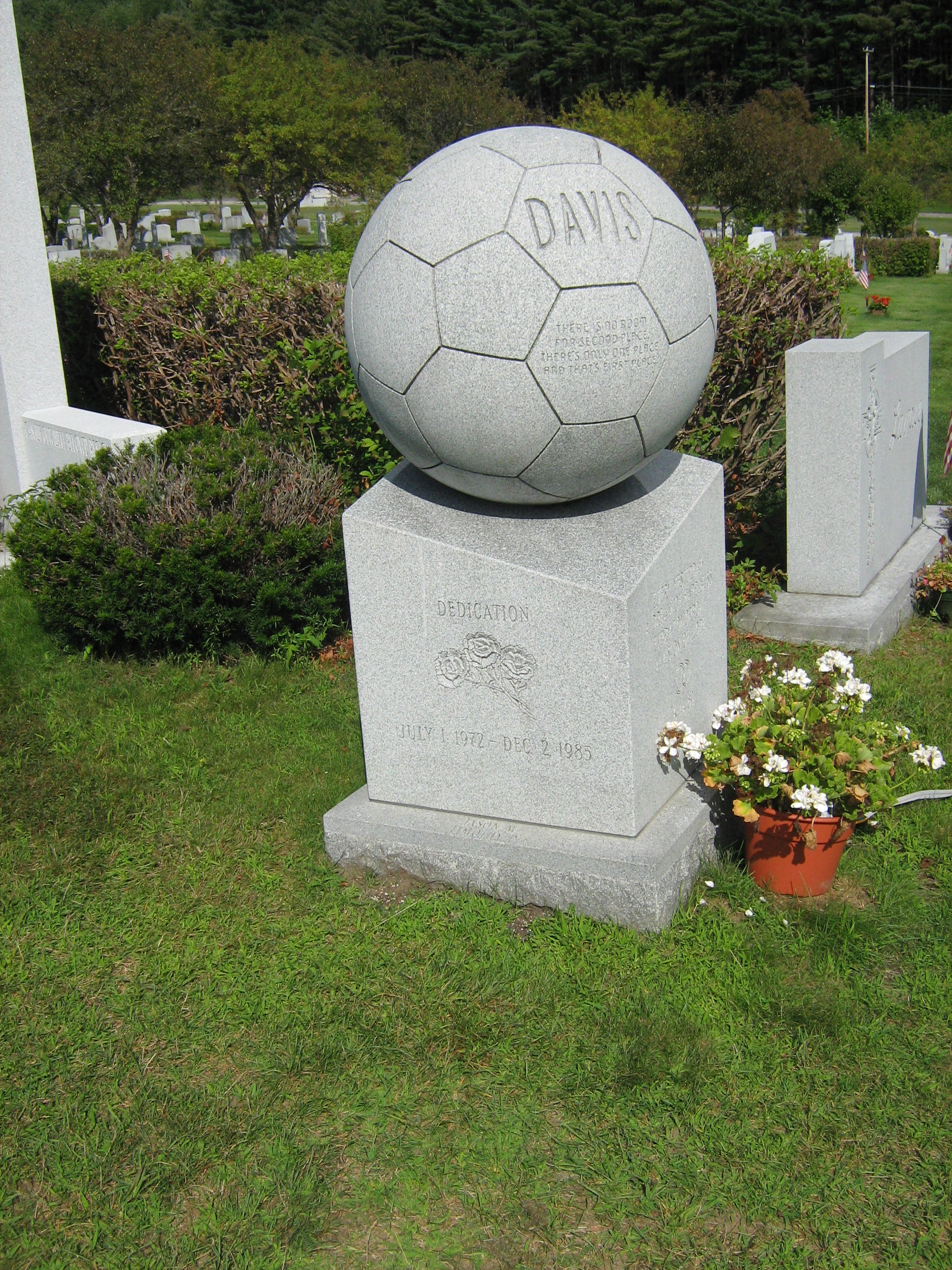
Gravestone of a 13-year-old soccer enthusiast.

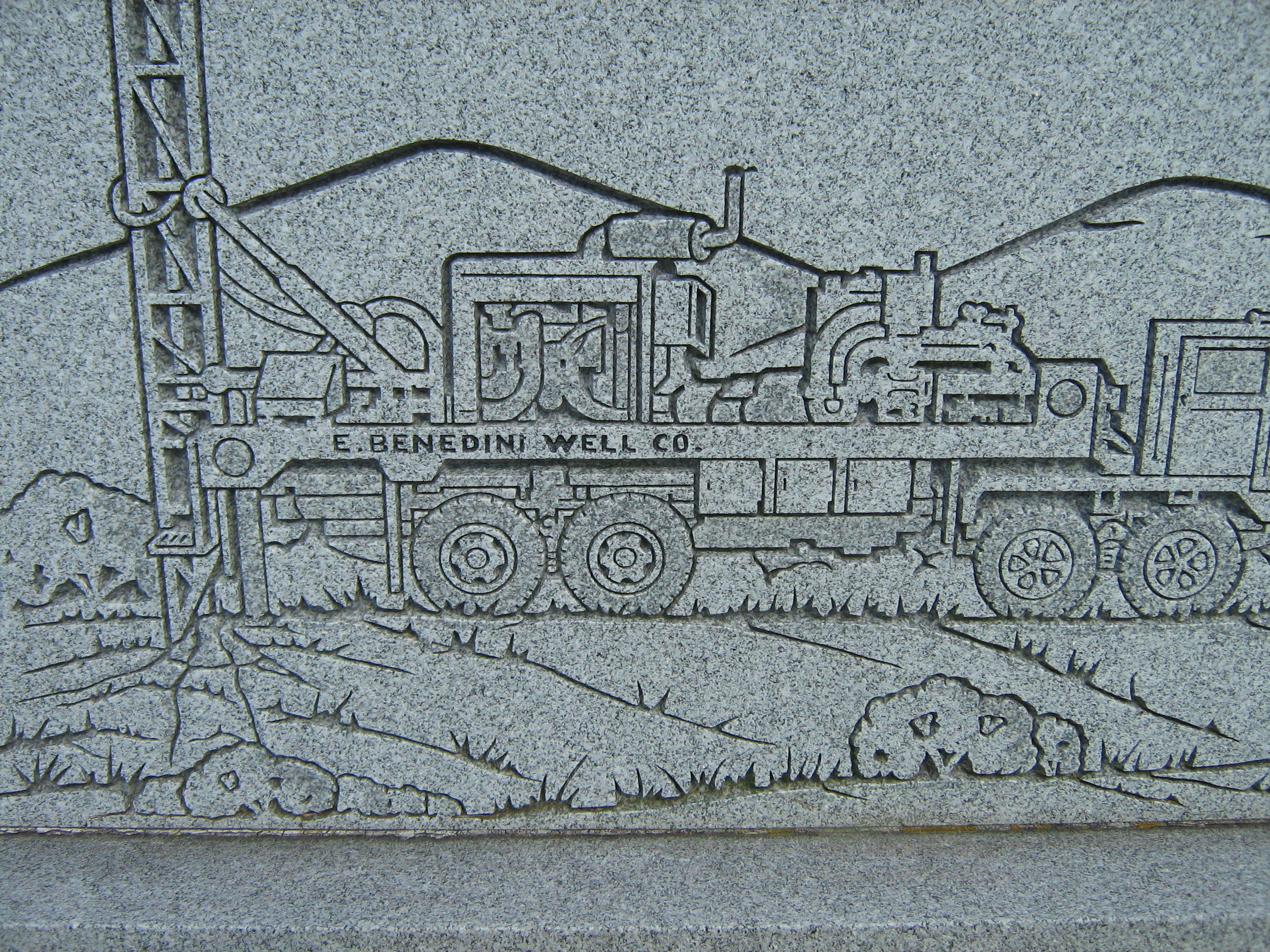
Detail of artwork on the gravestone of a well driller.
