= Fred W. Suitor =

American labor leader and politician

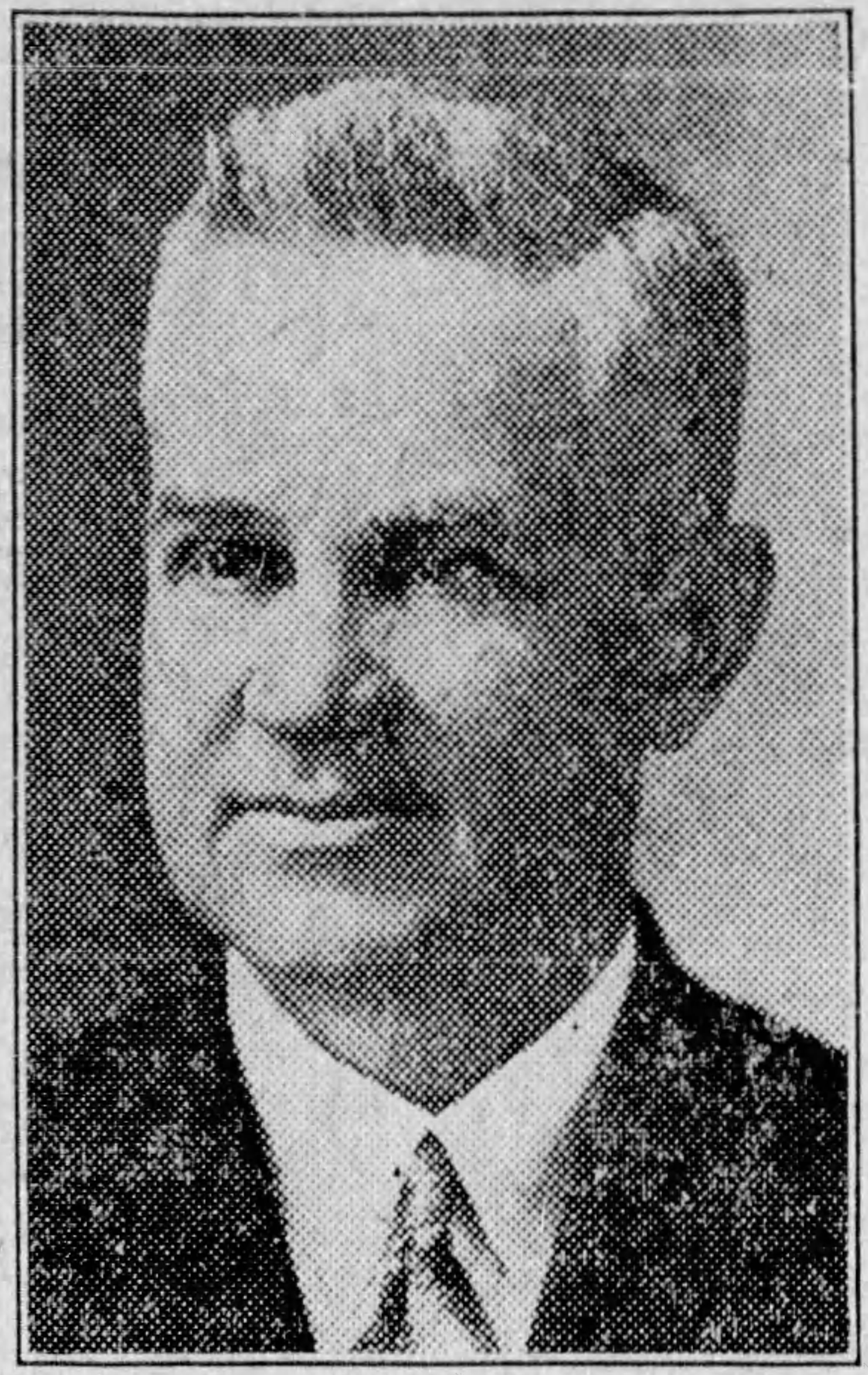
- Suitor c. 1932

Mayor of Barre, Vermont
- In office 1929–1931

Personal details
- Born: 1879 Leeds, Quebec
- Died: May 10, 1934 (aged 55)
- Occupation: Labor leader and politician

Fred W. Suitor (1879 – May 10, 1934) was an American labor leader and politician from Vermont. Suitor was a leader in the Quarry Workers' International Union of North America. Elected Secretary-Treasurer of the QWIUNA in 1911, he maintained that position until 1930. In 1915, he was president of the Vermont Federation of Labor. He was the second socialist mayor of Barre, Vermont after Robert Gordon.

== Labor ==
As a child, he worked part-time in a Quebec copper mill. He eventually became a blacksmith and worked in Vermont's large granite industry. In 1908, at the age of 29, Suitor became a business agent for the Quarry Workers union. In 1911, he was elected Secretary-Treasurer of the union, a position he continued in until 1930. He held other positions of influence in the union until his death in 1934.

== Politics ==
In politics, Suitor was a member of the Socialist Party of America, which distinguished him from some other high-ranking labor leaders who were often opposed to socialism. He was twice a candidate of the Socialist Party of Vermont for Governor (1912 and 1932). He was also involved in municipal politics in Barre and was elected as the city's mayor from 1929 to 1931.

While mayor, Suitor was known as a "sidewalk socialist", a play on the sewer socialism that emphasized immediate reforms over revolutionary changes common among elected socialists in the United States. Notable among his accomplishments as mayor was the creation of a public park, now known as Rotary Park. A major challenge Suitor confronted as mayor was the onset of the Great Depression. In response to the economic downturn, he proposed and voters approved a $50,000 bond to be used to improve infrastructure and keep local men working.

== Personal ==
Suitor was born in 1879 in the Anglophone village of Leeds, Quebec. In grade school, he worked part-time in a copper mill. In 1892, he and his family settled in Barre, Vermont. Suitor died following a series of heart attacks in the spring of 1934 at the age of 55. Historian Robert E. Weir notes that the former quarry worker "died at a relatively young age, though an advanced one by the standards of granite workers."

== See also ==
- List of elected socialist mayors in the United States
