= Rock of Ages Corporation =

Vermont based quarrying company

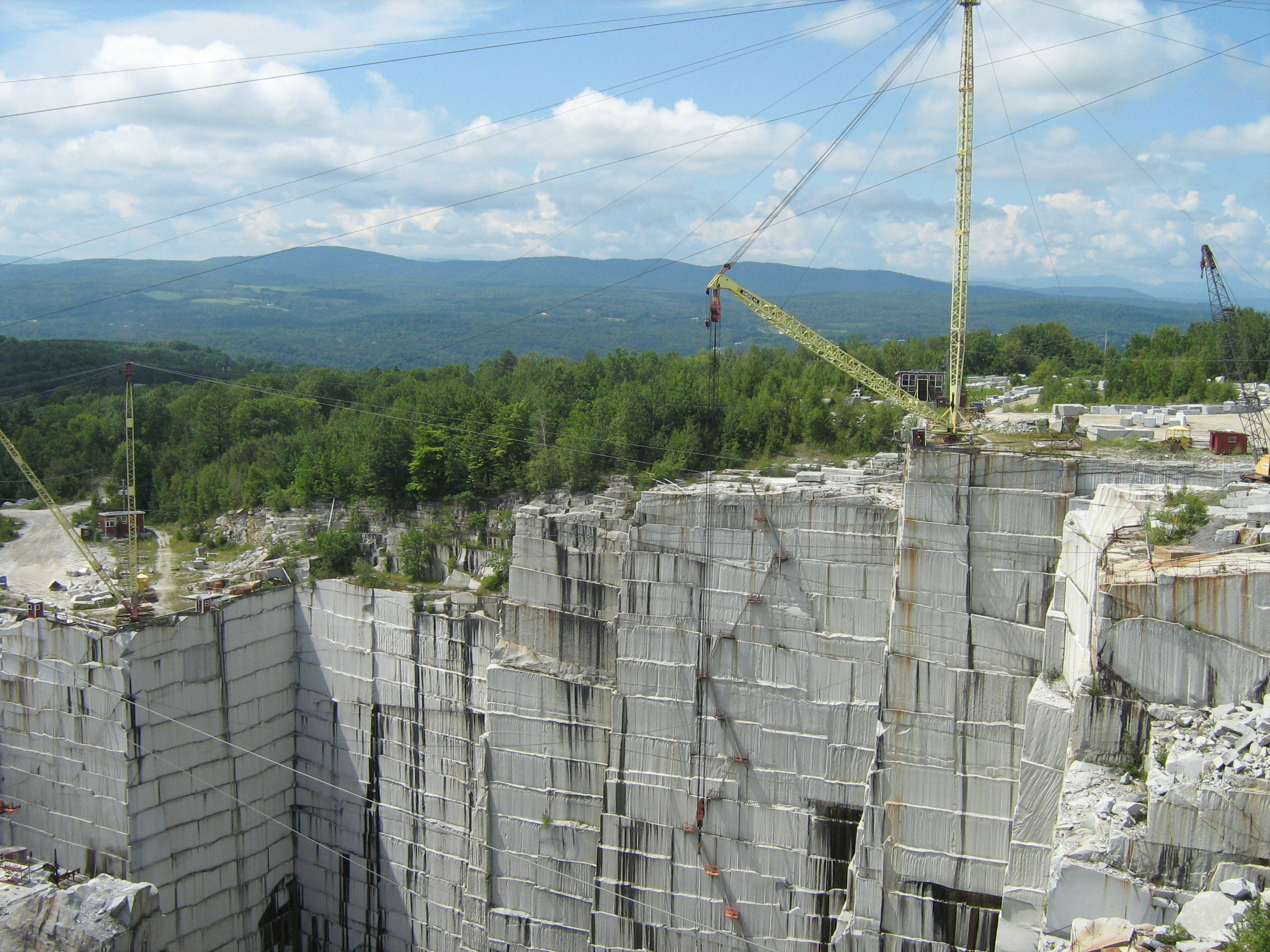
Rock of Ages granite quarry, viewed from an observation platform during a factory tour

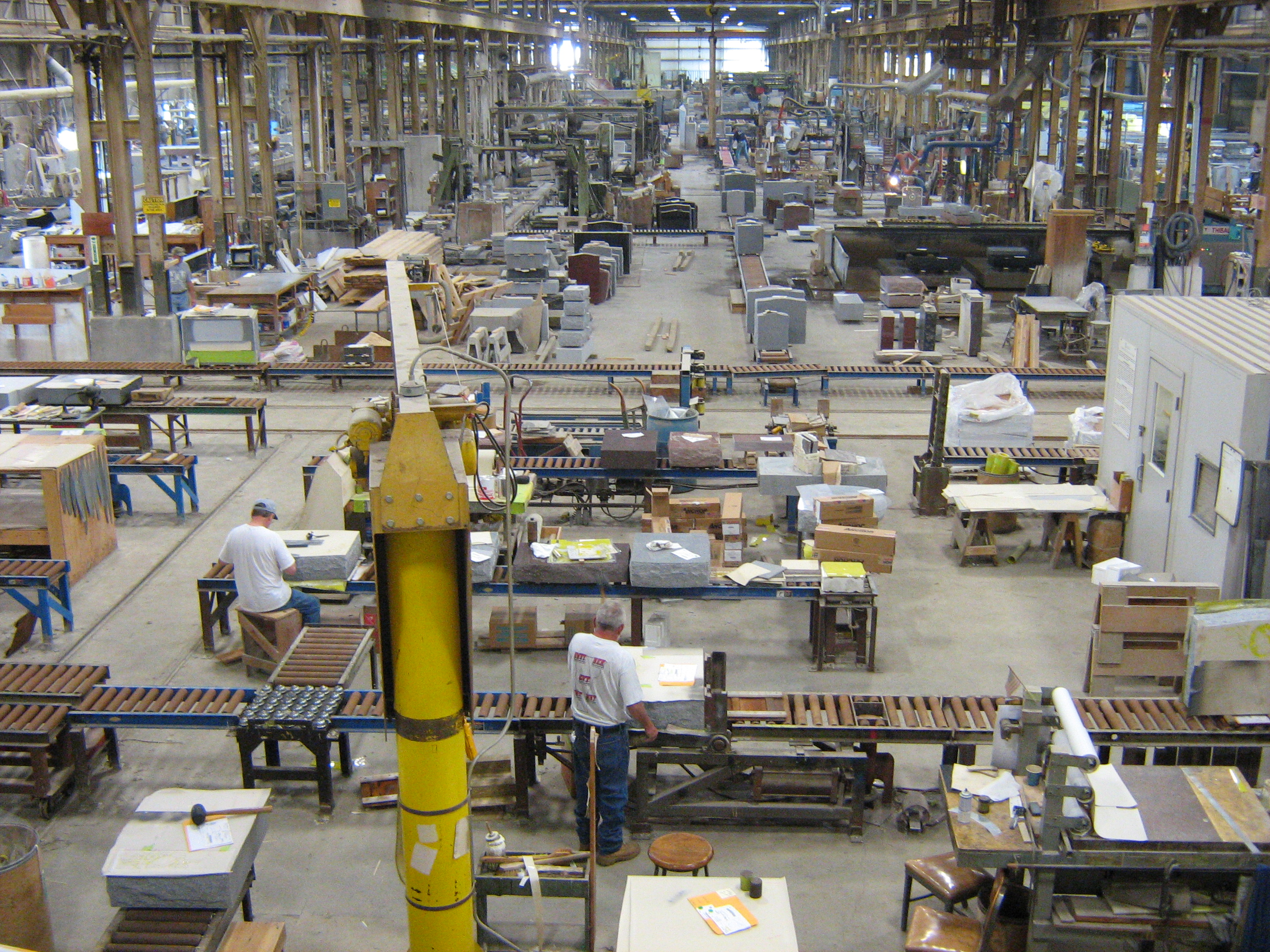
Rock of Ages granite shed

Rock of Ages Corporation is a granite quarrying and finishing company located in Graniteville, Vermont. It was founded in 1885.

The company employs around 230 people, and made a profit of around $800,000 in 2009 on revenues of $21.6 million, up from a loss of more than $2 million in 2008.

On 19 October 2010, Swenson Granite, based in Concord, New Hampshire, announced that it and Rock of Ages had agreed to merge. Swenson paid Rock of Ages shareholders a total of $39 million.

On 16 September 2016, Polycor inc., of Quebec City, Quebec, Canada -a natural stone producer, announced the acquisition of Swenson Granite and Rock of Ages Corporation to become the largest producer of marble and granite in North America. This also includes the Canadian division of Rock of Ages Corporation, located in Stanstead, Quebec, along the Vermont and Quebec border.

ROAC maintains the world's largest "deep hole" granite quarry. The quarry is called the "E. L. Smith Quarry", and the Devonian Barre Granite is mined there. Granite was originally quarried using primitive techniques in which hand saws and explosive charges were used to blast away the "benches" of the quarry. Modern techniques have evolved to include the use of diamond-tipped wire saws and water jets. Visitors to the Rock of Ages factory and gift shop can also watch quarriers in the quarry cutting the granite away from the quarry wall.

The company was one of the cemetery-related businesses profiled in the 2005 PBS documentary A Cemetery Special.

== Notable works ==
- United States Korean War Memorial, United Nations Memorial Cemetery, Busan, South Korea – a Frank Gaylord sculpture carved from Barre Granite.
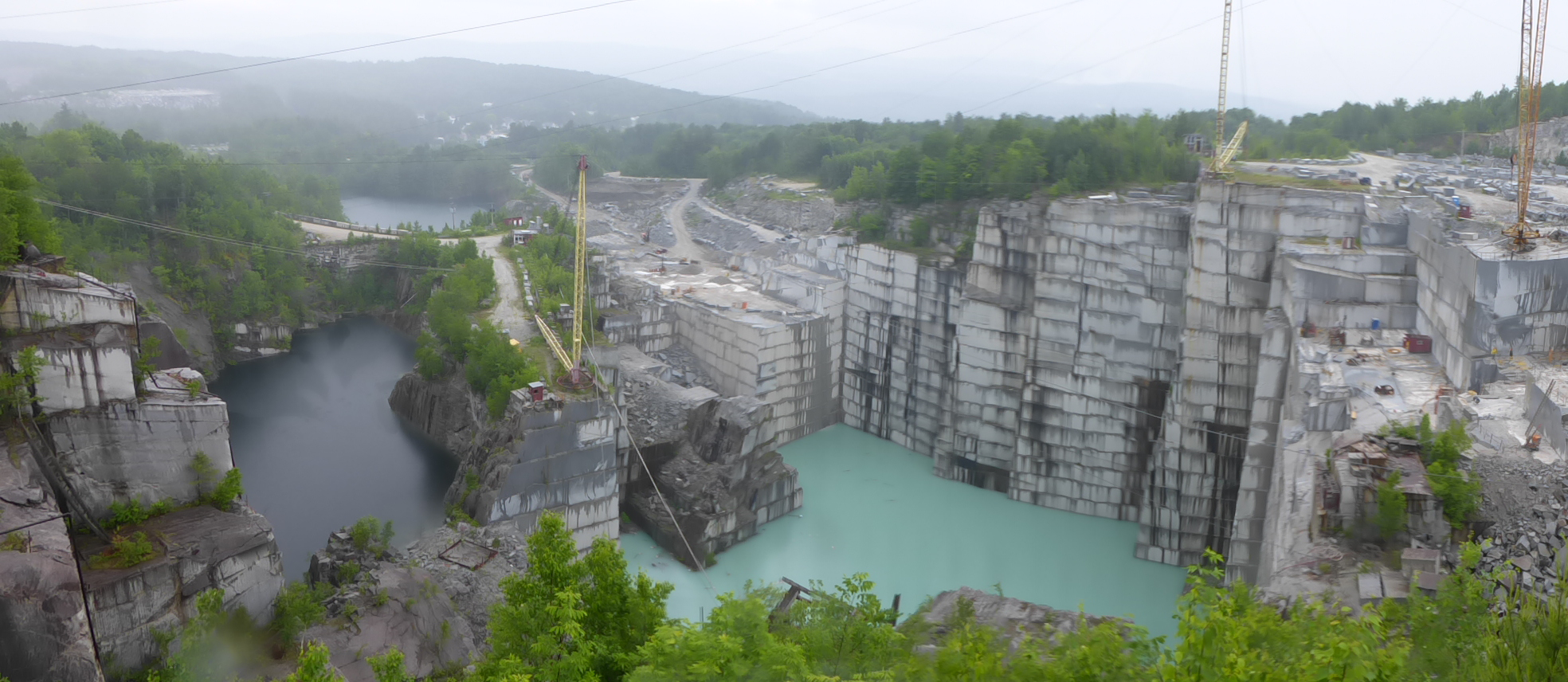
Rock of Ages panorama
