= George Floyd protests in Connecticut =

2020 civil unrest after the murder of George Floyd

- Part of George Floyd protests
- Date: May 28 – August 25, 2020 (2 months and 4 weeks)
- Location: Connecticut, United States
- Caused by: Police brutality; Institutional racism against African Americans; Reaction to the murder of George Floyd; Economic, racial and social inequality

Cities in Connecticut that held a protest with approximately 100 or more participants

This is a list of George Floyd protests in Connecticut, United States.

== Locations ==
=== Ansonia ===
A protest was held on June 8 with over a hundred participants.

=== Bridgeport ===
A section of Route 8 was shut down by protesters on May 30.

=== Cheshire ===
Around 500 people attended a protest march on June 7. Several members of the town committee were in attendance.

=== Danbury ===
On June 3, a protest march consumed downtown city streets in the early afternoon, and later spilled over onto Interstate 84.

=== Darien ===
A crowd ranging from a hundred to a thousand marched through Darien and Noroton on May 31.

=== East Hartford ===
On June 7, hundreds of protesters marched from a parking lot on Main Street along Interstate 84 to the Mortensen Riverfront Plaza in Hartford to protest police brutality.

=== East Haven ===
Several dozen residents gathered on the town green on June 5. Several members of the East Haven Police Department denounced the actions of the officers present at George Floyd's murder.

=== Enfield ===
On June 4, more than 300 people protested on Enfield's town green while a large contingent of protesters marched to the local police headquarters.

=== Fairfield ===
On June 2, hundreds of students marched throughout the town. The demonstrators, wearing black, filled Sherman Green at about 11:30 a.m., lying across Post Road in Downtown to block traffic. They also made a 3-mile march downtown, through the beach area and up to Old Town Hall, where they formed a speaking circle. The protest lasted well into the afternoon. There were also a few people standing outside Fairfield Police Department.

=== Greenwich ===
Several dozen protesters rallied near the Greenwich Police Department on June 1. The police chief and a selectman spoke to the crowd. Roads were closed and businesses were boarded up.

=== Groton ===
On June 7, nearly 1,000 people peacefully marched through the streets to support Black Lives Matter. The event was organized by students from Fitch High School.

=== Hamden ===
On June 2, around 50 protesters marched from the Abdul-Majid Karim Hasan Islamic Center to Town Hall to protest the murder of George Floyd and demand police accountability. On June 7, a protest with over a hundred people took place, which blocked Route 15.

=== Hartford ===
On May 29, hundreds of people protested in front of the Capitol. On May 30, more than 1,000 people marched to the Hartford Police Department and Connecticut State Capitol. On June 1, protesters demonstrated in front of the Hartford Police Department headquarters before marching to Interstate 84, where they blocked traffic on both sides. The event was peaceful despite warnings from police that they were blocking emergency vehicles from St. Francis Hospital. Some officers held hands and prayed with protesters. The demonstrators dispersed at 6:30 pm.

On June 6, hundreds of protesters attended multiple events in Hartford. The first one, called "No Lives Matter Until Black Lives Matter: Protest for Our Future", marched from Pope Park to the Capitol Building. A second protest was held at the Global Communications Academy, while another group marched from Bushnell Park to the Connecticut Supreme Court, where a silent sit-in was held.

=== Manchester ===
On June 6, demonstrators marched from Manchester City Hall to the police station at noon.

=== Meriden ===
On June 6, over 1,000 people gathered at the Meriden Green to support Black Lives Matter and George Floyd.

=== Middletown ===
A peaceful march across main street was attended by a few hundred people on Saturday night, May 30.

=== Mystic ===
Over a hundred people gathered at the Liberty Pole Square on June 2.

=== New Britain ===
On May 31 a march occurred with hundreds of participants at the Walnut Hill Park.

A "Ride for Unity" protest took place on June 2.

=== New Canaan ===
On June 4, peaceful protests took place in front of the police headquarters.

=== New Haven ===
On May 31, roughly 1,000 protesters shut down a section of Interstate 95.

On June 5, 5,000 protesters marched from the New Haven Green to the New Haven Police Department headquarters.

=== New London ===
Dozens of protesters gathered along Bank Street on May 30.

At least a thousand people marched in New London on June 6. Protesters called for the New London Police Department to be defunded and for a statue of Christopher Columbus to be removed.

=== Newington ===
On June 4, 2020 "hundreds of protesters" demonstrated in Newington.

On June 22, 2020, a protest was held at Mill Pond Park to advocate for defunding the police. It was countered by a Blue Lives Matter protest.

=== North Haven ===
Over 100 people attended a protest and march on the Town Green on August 25.

=== Norwich ===
Several hundred protesters gathered in Downtown Norwich on June 2.

=== Old Saybrook ===
On June 3, hundreds of people gathered for a vigil to honor victims of police brutality. They marched up and down Main Street and also gathered at the Katharine Hepburn Cultural Arts Center, where they listened to a group of speakers, including State Senator Norm Needleman.

=== Oxford ===
On June 7, over 400 people gathered on Route 67. Protesters took a knee for about eight minutes 46 seconds.

=== Portland ===
Around two dozen people attended a protest at the Arrigoni Bridge despite the event's cancellation due to construction. They lay down in the center of the bridge, blocking traffic on both sides.

=== Shelton ===
More than 120 people gathered at the Huntington Green for a protest on May 31.

=== Southington ===
Hundreds gathered for a protest on June 1 at the town green.

=== Stamford ===
Hundreds gathered at the Stamford Police Headquarters on May 31 for an eight-minute "kneel of silence."

=== Stratford ===
A peaceful protest was held in front of town hall on May 30, with a few hundred protesters.

=== Torrington ===
Hundreds gathered for a protest on June 3.

=== Trumbull ===
On June 6, a protest occurred at the gazebo at Trumbull Town Hall at 11am.

=== Wallingford ===
A silent protest was held on June 5 near Wallingford Town Hall. Hundreds of people attended.

=== Waterbury ===
On May 31, peaceful demonstrations took place in two locations: at the intersection of Wolcott Street and Long Hill Road, and outside the Waterbury Police Department. 28 people were arrested for disorderly conduct, though no property damage or protester injuries were reported. On July 4, 2020, the statue of Christopher Columbus by the late Frank C. Gaylord was vandalized and decapitated. by Brandon Ambrose, who turned himself in to Waterbury police, and who was charged and convicted of criminal mischief and desecration of property, (those charges could be dropped if Ambrose completes a criminal diversion program.), and fined $8,800. Police said Ambrose attempted to sell the nose of the statue online.

=== Watertown ===
On June 19 a march was held in Watertown. Protesters marched from the town Green to Main Street.

=== West Hartford ===
On June 2, several hundred families and individuals gathered outside of West Hartford City Hall.

=== West Haven ===
On June 5, a group of people marched to the West Haven Police Department. They also protested the death of Mubarak Soulemane, who was killed in West Haven by a state trooper in January. A woman drove her car into the protesters.

=== Weston ===
On June 7, students from Weston High School organized a peaceful protest against police brutality at the town library.

=== Westport ===
On May 31, a hundred people rallied in downtown Westport.

=== Wethersfield ===
Hundreds of protesters marched to the Wethersfield Police Department on June 5.

=== Windsor ===
On June 7, the Human Relations Commission organized a vigil on town green on Broad Street to honor George Floyd and others killed by police.
