= Barre (town), Vermont =

Barre, Vermont
- Town
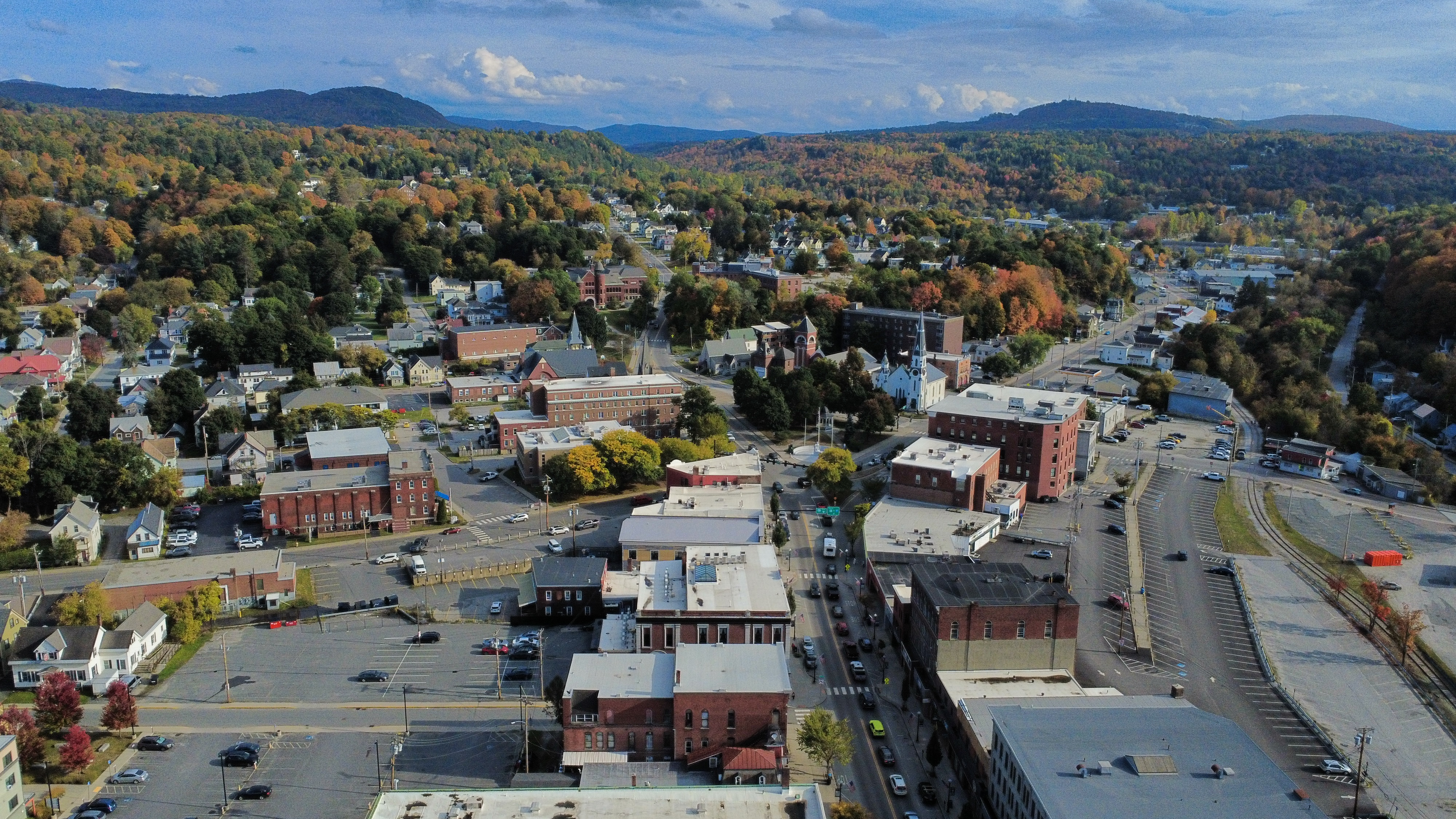
- Barre, VT, from the northwest

- Seal
- Motto: Vis Collis Eius Etiam Vis Noster Est
- Location in Washington County and the state of Vermont
- Coordinates: 44°11′10″N 72°29′32″W
- Country: United States
- State: Vermont
- County: Washington
- Communities: East Barre; Graniteville; Lower Websterville; South Barre; Upper Graniteville; Websterville

Area
  - Total: 30.7 sq mi (79.5 km^{2})
  - Land: 30.7 sq mi (79.4 km^{2})
  - Water: 0.039 sq mi (0.1 km^{2})
- Elevation: 994 ft (303 m)

Population (2020)
  - Total: 7,923
  - Density: 258/sq mi (99.8/km^{2})
- Time zone: UTC-5 (Eastern (EST))
  - Summer (DST): UTC-4 (EDT)
- ZIP Codes: 05641 (Barre); 05649 (East Barre); 05654 (Graniteville); 05670 (South Barre); 05678 (Websterville)
- Area code: 802
- FIPS code: 50-03250
- GNIS feature ID: 1462036
- Website: www.barretown.org

Barre (/ˈbæri/ BARR-ee) is a town in Washington County, Vermont, United States. The population was 7,923 at the 2020 census, making it the 3rd largest municipality in Washington County and the 16th largest municipality in Vermont. Popularly referred to as "Barre Town", the town of Barre almost completely surrounds "Barre City", which is a separate municipality. The original town now known as Barre was first chartered in 1780 as the Town of Wildersburgh. In 1793 the name Wildersburgh was unpopular with the inhabitants and the name of the town was changed to Barre. In 1895 the City of Barre was incorporated and separated from the town of Barre, and both continue to exist as separate municipalities.

== Geography ==
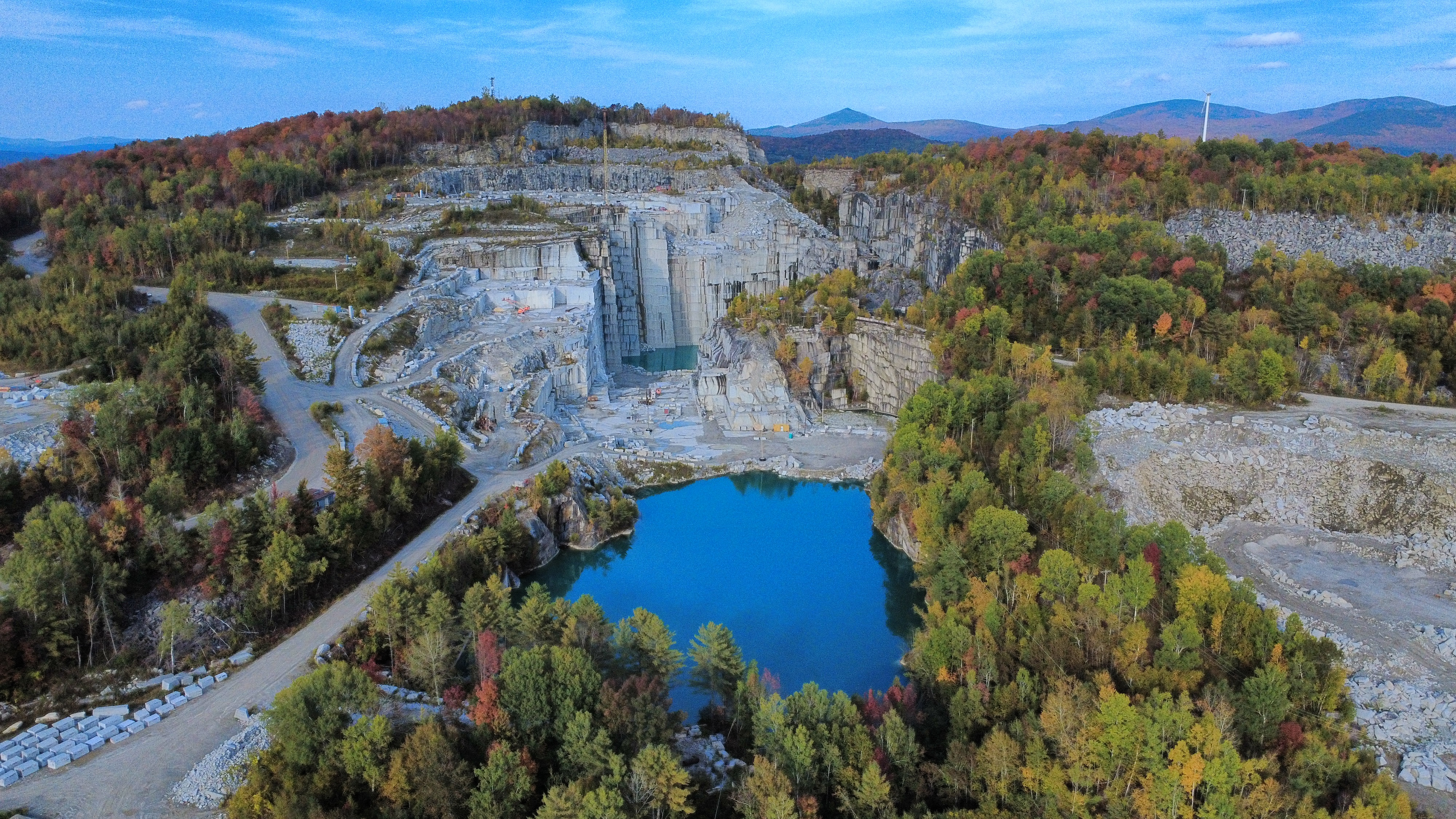
Rock of Ages Quarry, VT, from the southwest

According to the United States Census Bureau, the town has a total area of 30.7 square miles (79.5 km^{2}), of which 30.6 square miles (79.4 km^{2}) is land and 0.1 square mile (0.1 km^{2}) (0.16%) is water. Barre is the self-proclaimed "Granite Center of the World". Initially established with the discovery of vast granite deposits at Millstone Hill soon after the War of 1812, the granite industry and the town itself saw a boom with the arrival of the railroad. The fame of this vast deposit of granite, which some geologists say is 4 miles (6.4 km) long, 2 miles (3.2 km) wide and 10 miles (16 km) deep, soon spread to Europe and Canada. Large numbers of people migrated to Barre from Italy, Scotland, Spain, Scandinavia, Greece, Lebanon, Canada, and a number of other countries. The population increased from 2,060 in 1880, to 6,790 in 1890, to 10,000 in 1894. Millstone Hill and the nearby Barre Town Forest are now the site of a recreational, wooded trail network, where the mining holes and grout piles are still peppered throughout.

== Government ==
Barre Town is represented by Francis "Topper" McFaun (R) and Robert LaClair (R) in the Washington-2 district of the Vermont House of Representatives. It is represented by Ann Cummings (D-Montpelier), Anthony Pollina (P-Middlesex) and Andrew Perchlik (D-Montpelier) in the Washington district of the Vermont Senate.

=== Local government ===
All governmental authority of the Town rests with the citizens of the Town, who exercise their powers in Town meeting and/or Town elections, and to whom the elected and appointed officers of the Town are ultimately responsible. Except as otherwise provided in the Town Charter, all the powers of the Town shall be entrusted to and exercised by a Selectboard composed of five members chosen by the voters of the Town. Three members shall be elected for terms of three years, and two members shall be elected for terms of two years. The Selectboard shall discharge all the duties conferred or imposed upon selectboards by law, including the duties of sewer commissioners, Board of Liquor Commissioners, Local Board of Health, and any similar ex officio duties. The Town Manager is the Chief Administrative Officer of the Town and is appointed by the Selectboard.

- Selectboard – Paul White (Chair), Norma Malone (Vice-Chair), W. John "Jack" Mitchell, Bob Nelson, and Justin Bolduc.
- Town Manager – Carl Rogers
- Town Clerk – Tina Lunt

=== Communities ===
- "Barre City" is incorporated separately from the Town ("Barre Town").
- East Barre is an unincorporated village and census-designated place (CDP) located near the eastern border of the town at the intersection of U.S. Route 302 and Vermont Route 110 next to the Jail Branch of the Winooski River.
- Graniteville, a CDP near the southern border of the town, is home to the Rock of Ages E.L. Smith Quarry, the world's largest deep hole quarry. It was used as a backdrop in Batman & Robin and Star Trek.
- South Barre is an unincorporated village and CDP located south of the City of Barre, along Vermont Route 14 and the Stevens Branch of the Winooski River.
- Websterville is an unincorporated village and CDP.

== Demographics ==
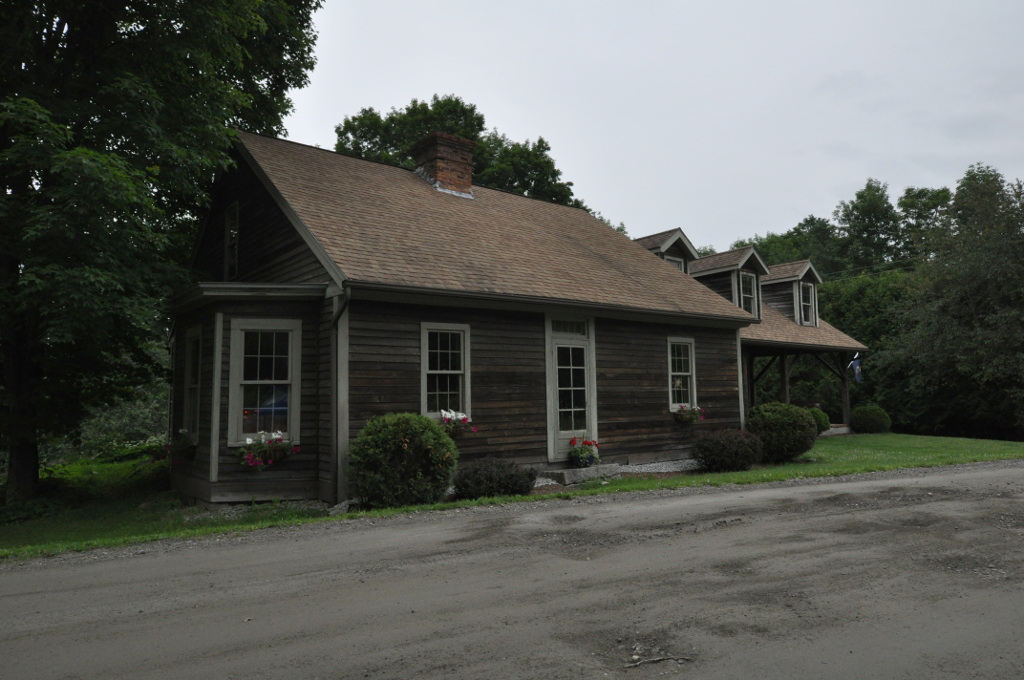
Nichols House, East Barre, Vermont.

Historical population
Census	Pop.	Note	%±
1790	76		—
1800	919		1,109.2%
1810	1,669		81.6%
1820	1,955		17.1%
1830	2,012		2.9%
1840	2,126		5.7%
1850	1,845		−13.2%
1860	1,839		−0.3%
1870	1,882		2.3%
1880	2,060		9.5%
1890	6,812		230.7%
1900	3,346		−50.9%
1910	4,194		25.3%
1920	3,882		−7.4%
1930	4,280		10.3%
1940	4,052		−5.3%
1950	4,145		2.3%
1960	4,580		10.5%
1970	6,509		42.1%
1980	7,090		8.9%
1990	7,411		4.5%
2000	7,602		2.6%
2010	7,924		4.2%
2020	7,923		0.0%
U.S. Decennial Census

As of the census of 2000, there were 7,602 people, 2,951 households, and 2,216 families residing in the town. The population density was 248.1 people per square mile (95.8/km^{2}). There were 3,046 housing units at an average density of 99.4 per square mile (38.4/km^{2}). The racial makeup of the town was 98.47% White, 0.18% Black or African American, 0.09% Native American, 0.29% Asian, 0.18% from other races, and 0.78% from two or more races. Hispanic or Latino of any race were 1.51% of the population.

There were 2,951 households, out of which 34.4% had children under the age of 18 living with them, 64.0% were couples living together and joined in either marriage or civil union, 7.6% had a female householder with no husband present, and 24.9% were non-families. 20.3% of all households were made up of individuals, and 8.9% had someone living alone who was 65 years of age or older. The average household size was 2.57 and the average family size was 2.95.

In the town, the population was spread out, with 25.6% under the age of 18, 6.1% from 18 to 24, 27.7% from 25 to 44, 26.7% from 45 to 64, and 13.9% who were 65 years of age or older. The median age was 40 years. For every 100 females, there were 94.7 males. For every 100 females age 18 and over, there were 93.4 males.

The median income for a household in the town was $46,563, and the median income for a family was $53,565. Males had a median income of $32,873 versus $26,061 for females. The per capita income for the town was $21,609. About 3.7% of families and 5.2% of the population were below the poverty line, including 6.9% of those under age 18 and 1.9% of those age 65 or over.

== Education ==
Barre Town has its own public school, Barre Town Middle and Elementary School, which hosts students from pre-school through grade eight. The public high school is Spaulding High School and is located in Barre City. Also located in Barre Town are the Websterville Christian Academy and the Montessori School of Central Vermont.

== Notable people ==
- Jodi Cilley, film producer, educator and entrepreneur
- Lui Collins, singer-songwriter (folk)
- Madelyn Davidson, Vermont State Treasurer
- A. Clarke Dodge (1834–1916), Wisconsin businessman and politician
- Norman Dubie, poet
- D. C. Jarvis (1881–1966), physician
- Miranda July, performance artist, musician, writer, and film director
- Dave Moody, NASCAR commentator
- Katherine Paterson, Newbery Award-winning author of books for children
- Tracey Poirier, Vermont National Guard brigadier general
- Helen Bonchek Schneyer, folk musician

== See also ==
- Isaac Barré
