= Barre (city), Vermont =

City in Vermont, United States

Barre, Vermont
- City
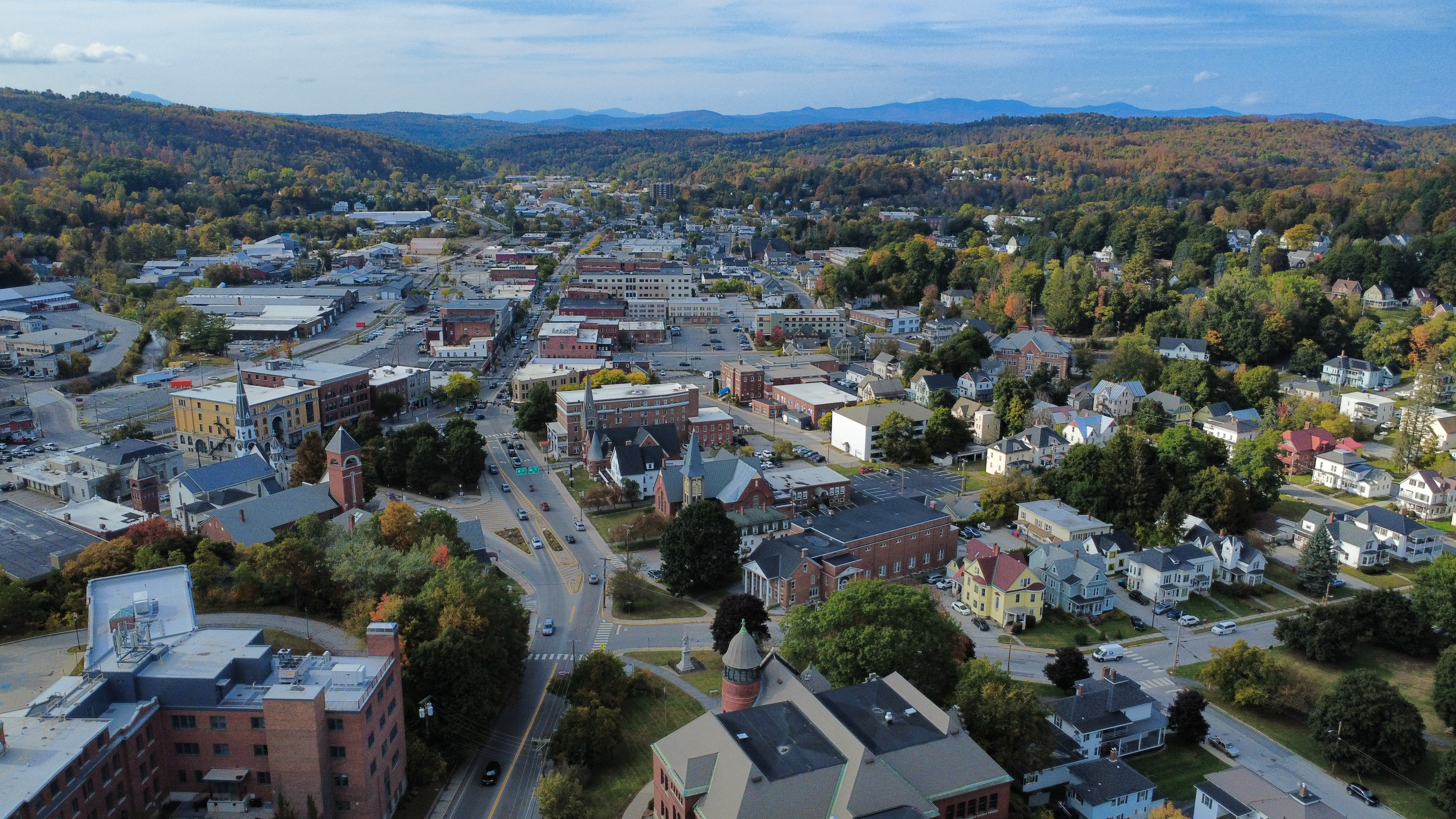
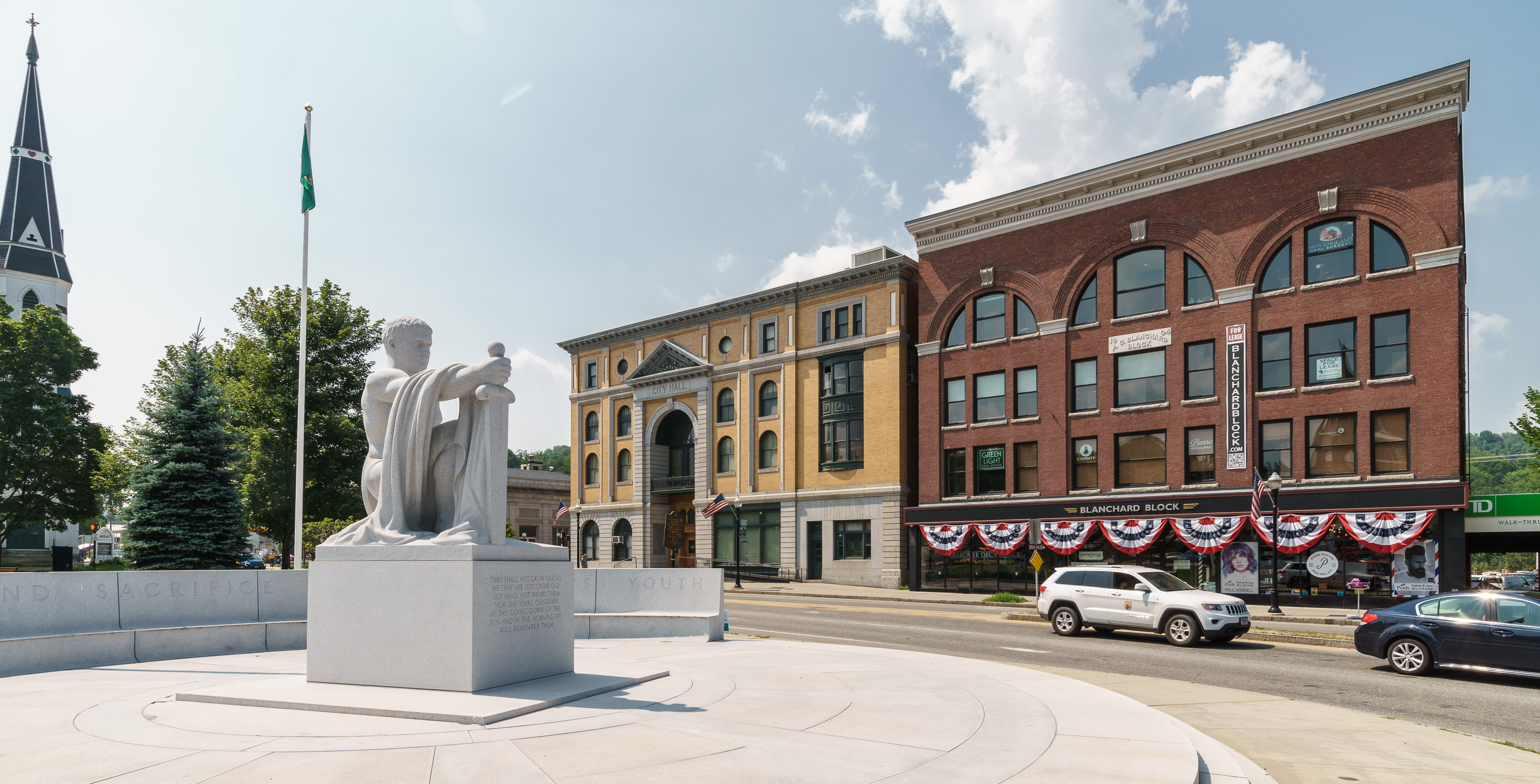
- Barre, VT, from the southeast "Youth Triumphant" welcomes visitors to Barre

- Flag Seal
- Nickname: Granite Center of the World
- Location in Washington County and the state of Vermont
- Coordinates: 44°11′53″N 72°30′06″W
- Country: United States
- State: Vermont
- County: Washington
- Incorporated: 1895
- Named for: Isaac Barré

Area
  - City: 3.98 sq mi (10.31 km^{2})
  - Land: 3.95 sq mi (10.22 km^{2})
  - Water: 0.031 sq mi (0.08 km^{2})
- Elevation: 600 ft (180 m)

Population (2020)
  - City: 8,491
  - Density: 2,160.8/sq mi (834.29/km^{2})
  - Metro: 59,626
- Time zone: UTC−5 (Eastern (EST))
  - Summer (DST): UTC−4 (EDT)
- ZIP code: 05641
- Area code: 802
- FIPS code: 50-03175
- GNIS feature ID: 1462035
- Website: www.barrecity.org

Barre (/ˈbæri/ BARE-ee) is a city in and the most populous municipality of Washington County, Vermont, United States. As of the 2020 census, the municipal population was 8,491. Popularly referred to as "Barre City", it is almost completely surrounded by "Barre Town", which is a separate municipality.

Barre is often twinned with the nearby Vermont state capital of Montpelier in local media and businesses. It is the main city in the Barre-Montpelier micropolitan area, which has nearly 60,000 residents and is Vermont's third largest metropolitan area after those of Burlington and Rutland. Barre is also Vermont's fifth largest city.

== History ==
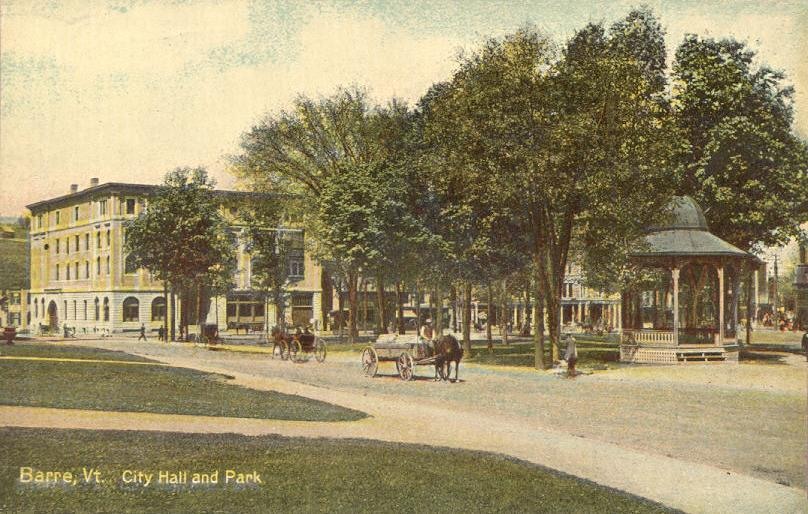
City Hall and park in c. 1910

On November 6, 1780, the land was granted to William Williams and 64 others. Originally called Wildersburgh, it included what is today both the town and city of Barre. It was first settled in 1788 by John Goldsbury and Samuel Rodgers, together with their families. But dissatisfied with the name Wildersburgh, citizens renamed the town after Isaac Barré, a champion of the American Colonies. In 1895, 4.0 square miles (10 km^{2}) within the town was set off and incorporated as the separate city. "In 1780 a tract of 19,900 acres of land in Vermont was chartered under the name of "Wildersburgh" to a number of proprietors. At a town-meeting of the inhabitants of this tract held in September, 1793, it was agreed that a house of worship should be erected, and it was voted that the man who would give the most towards building the same should have the right to name the township. Ezekiel Dodge Wheeler bid £62, and was permitted to name the township "Barre"—for Barre, Massachusetts, whence some of the settlers of the new township had emigrated."

=== Granite industry ===
Barre Granite

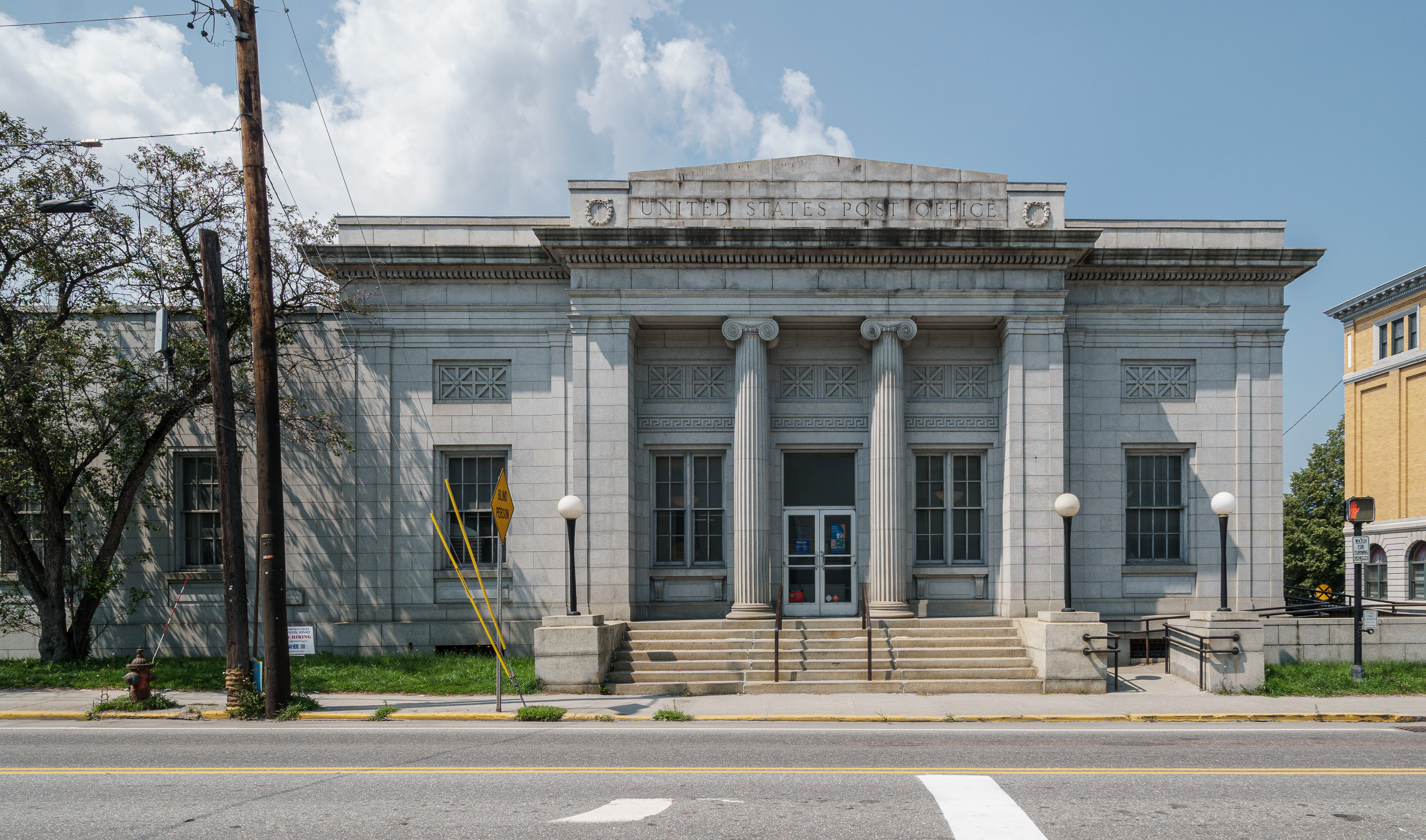
The downtown post office is one of many Barre buildings made from local granite

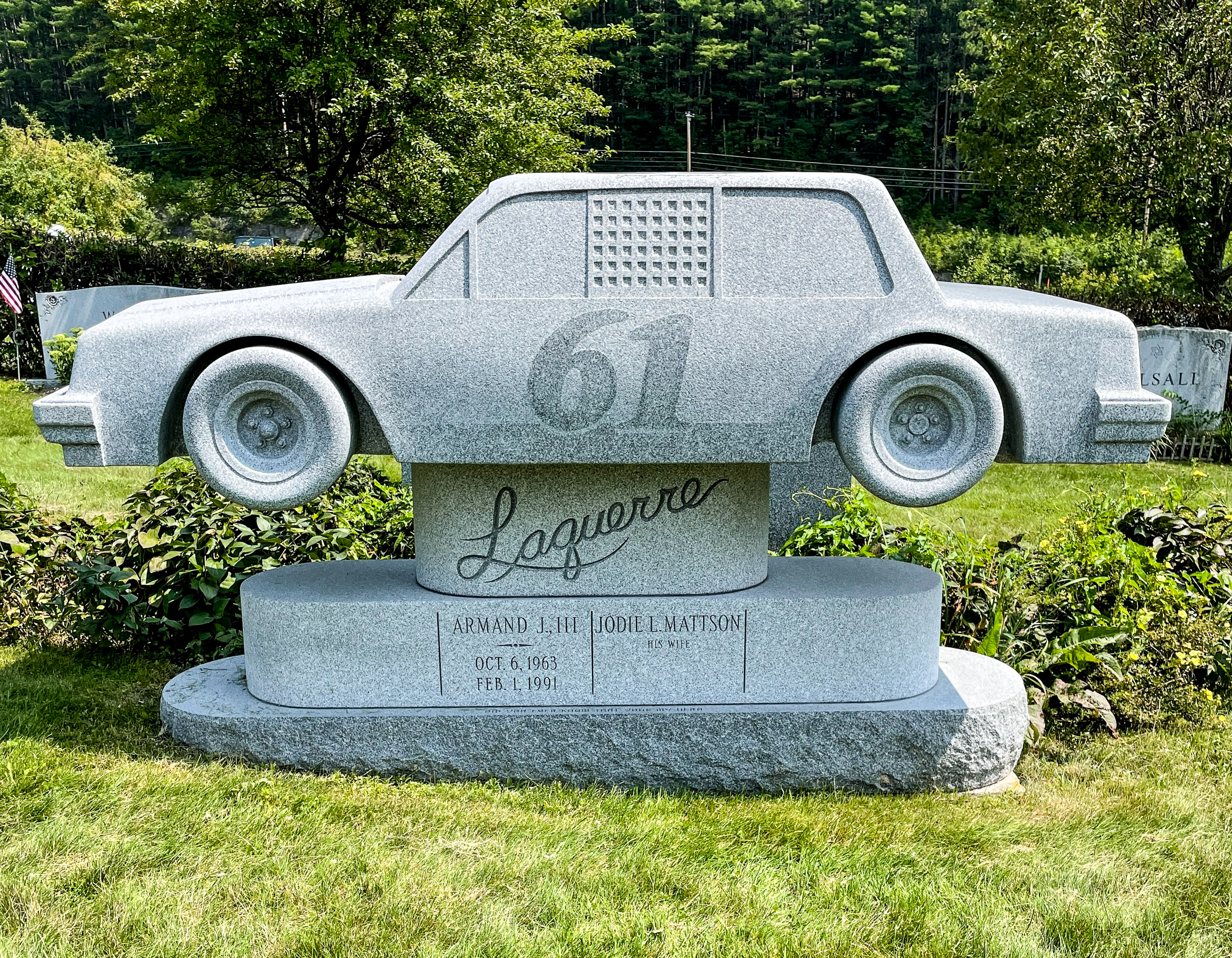
Barre's Hope Cemetery is widely known for its elaborate granite headstones

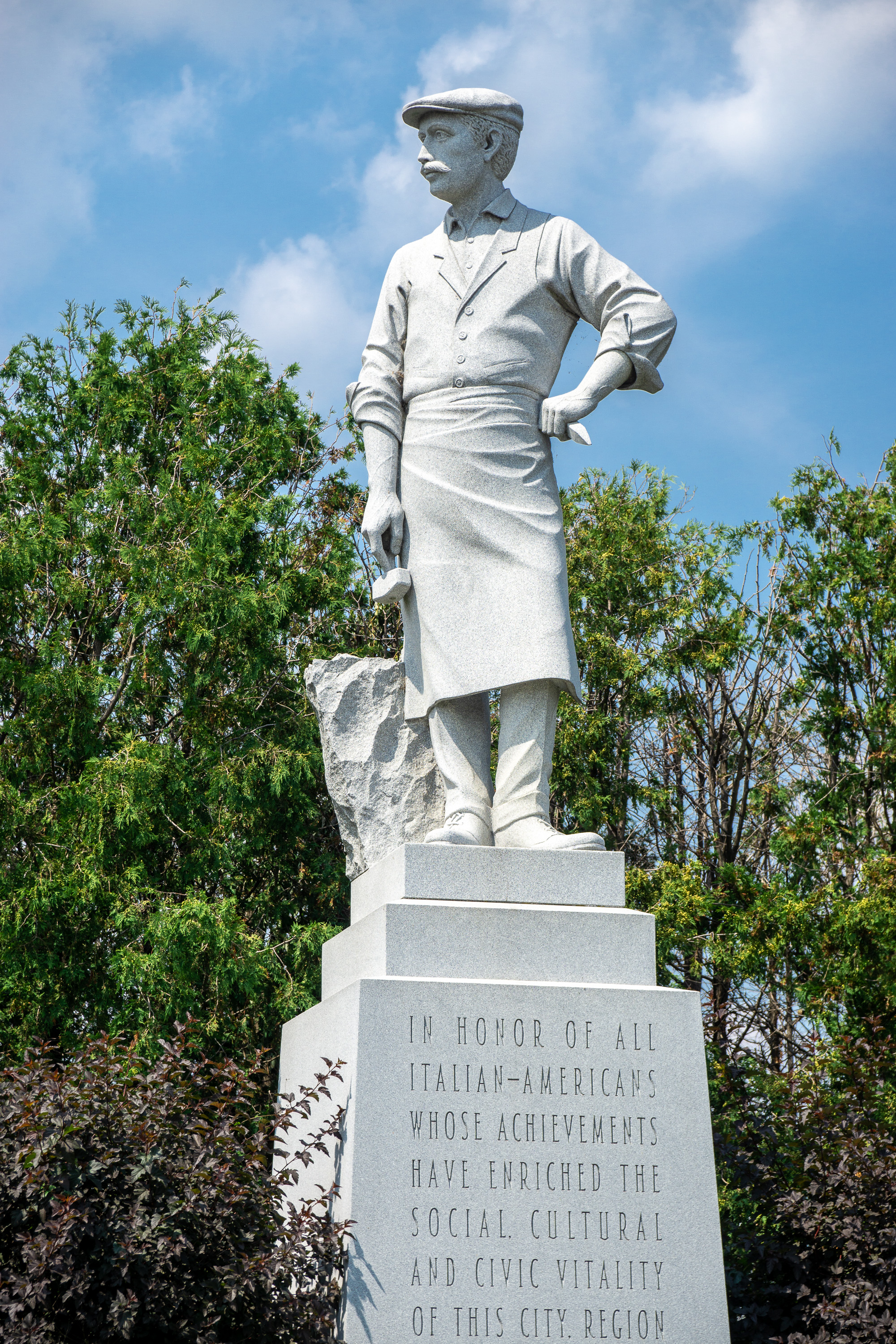
The Stonecutter Memorial is a tribute to Barre's Italian stonecutter heritage

Barre is the self-proclaimed "fGranite Center of the World". Initially established with the discovery of vast granite deposits at Millstone Hill soon after the War of 1812, the granite industry and the city itself saw a boom with the arrival of the railroad. The fame of this vast deposit of granite, which some geologists say is 4 miles (6.4 km) long, 2 miles (3.2 km) wide and 10 miles (16 km) deep, soon spread to Europe and Canada. Large numbers of people migrated to Barre from Italy, Scotland, Spain, Scandinavia, Greece, Lebanon, Canada, and a number of other countries. The population increased from 2,060 in 1880, to 6,790 in 1890, to 10,000 in 1894. By the turn of the century, Barre was noted as the state's most diverse city.

Millstone Hill is now the site of a recreational, wooded trail network, where the mining holes and grout piles are still peppered throughout.

The Italian immigrants in particular brought a radical, largely anarchist labor movement to Barre. In the 1920s and 1930s, a number of granite strikes roiled the city; some disputes concerned wages, but workers increasingly mobilized to address health and hazard in the quarries and "sheds." The strike of 1922, arguably fought to a draw, raised ethnic tensions; French Canadians were painted as strikebreakers. The Quarry Workers' International Union of North America was based in Barre. They were originally affiliated with the Socialist Labor Party before affiliating with the Industrial Workers of the World, and in 1916 and in 1929 the city elected a Socialist Party candidate as mayor of Barre. The old Socialist Labor Party Hall is still standing and was listed on the National Register of Historic Places in 2000.

"Barre Gray" granite is sought after worldwide for its fine grain, even texture, and superior weather resistance. Many sculpture artists prefer it for outdoor sculpture. In 1936 the granite quarry in Barre carved out a 35-ton cross from one section of stone in the quarry.

Hope Cemetery in Barre displays extensive examples of the sculptors' art.

== Geography and climate ==
According to the United States Census Bureau, the city has a total area of 4.0 square miles (10 km^{2}), all land. Barre is drained by the Stevens Branch River and Jail Branch River, tributaries of the Winooski River.

The city is served by I-89, US 302, VT 14 and VT 62. It is bordered by the town of Berlin to the west but is otherwise surrounded by the separate Town of Barre.

Climate data for Montpelier, VT (Edward F. Knapp State Airport) 1991–2020 normals, extremes 1948–present)
Month	Jan	Feb	Mar	Apr	May	Jun	Jul	Aug	Sep	Oct	Nov	Dec	Year
Record high °F (°C)	66 (19)	70 (21)	82 (28)	90 (32)	91 (33)	95 (35)	97 (36)	97 (36)	92 (33)	85 (29)	76 (24)	67 (19)	97 (36)
Mean maximum °F (°C)	50.3 (10.2)	50.0 (10.0)	59.8 (15.4)	75.6 (24.2)	83.8 (28.8)	87.9 (31.1)	88.4 (31.3)	87.0 (30.6)	83.7 (28.7)	74.5 (23.6)	65.0 (18.3)	51.9 (11.1)	90.2 (32.3)
Mean daily maximum °F (°C)	25.8 (−3.4)	28.9 (−1.7)	37.6 (3.1)	51.5 (10.8)	65.0 (18.3)	73.2 (22.9)	77.6 (25.3)	76.1 (24.5)	68.6 (20.3)	55.3 (12.9)	42.8 (6.0)	31.3 (−0.4)	52.8 (11.6)
Daily mean °F (°C)	16.6 (−8.6)	18.9 (−7.3)	27.9 (−2.3)	40.9 (4.9)	53.3 (11.8)	61.8 (16.6)	66.5 (19.2)	64.9 (18.3)	57.4 (14.1)	45.5 (7.5)	34.4 (1.3)	23.2 (−4.9)	42.6 (5.9)
Mean daily minimum °F (°C)	7.4 (−13.7)	8.9 (−12.8)	18.1 (−7.7)	30.3 (−0.9)	41.7 (5.4)	50.5 (10.3)	55.5 (13.1)	53.7 (12.1)	46.3 (7.9)	35.7 (2.1)	26.0 (−3.3)	15.1 (−9.4)	32.4 (0.2)
Mean minimum °F (°C)	−16.7 (−27.1)	−12.0 (−24.4)	−4.3 (−20.2)	17.0 (−8.3)	28.5 (−1.9)	37.8 (3.2)	45.1 (7.3)	43.1 (6.2)	32.3 (0.2)	22.6 (−5.2)	9.1 (−12.7)	−6.9 (−21.6)	−19.2 (−28.4)
Record low °F (°C)	−34 (−37)	−29 (−34)	−18 (−28)	2 (−17)	20 (−7)	29 (−2)	35 (2)	31 (−1)	20 (−7)	14 (−10)	−7 (−22)	−27 (−33)	−34 (−37)
Average precipitation inches (mm)	2.32 (59)	2.06 (52)	2.49 (63)	3.04 (77)	3.52 (89)	4.21 (107)	4.27 (108)	3.81 (97)	3.33 (85)	3.87 (98)	2.85 (72)	2.93 (74)	38.70 (983)
Average snowfall inches (cm)	22.6 (57)	18.0 (46)	16.8 (43)	4.9 (12)	0.0 (0.0)	0.0 (0.0)	0.0 (0.0)	0.0 (0.0)	0.0 (0.0)	0.9 (2.3)	9.1 (23)	21.9 (56)	94.2 (239)
Average precipitation days (≥ 0.01 in)	13.6	13.2	12.7	13.5	13.9	14.4	14.0	12.6	10.9	13.9	13.9	15.4	162.0
Average snowy days (≥ 0.1 in)	12.0	9.1	7.5	3.3	0.0	0.0	0.0	0.0	0.0	0.9	5.7	11.7	50.2
Average ultraviolet index	1	2	3	5	7	8	8	7	5	3	2	1	4
Source 1: NOAA (snow 1981–2010)
Source 2: Weather Atlas

== Demographics ==
Historical population
Census	Pop.	Note	%±
1850	1,845		—
1860	1,839		−0.3%
1870	1,882		2.3%
1880	2,060		9.5%
1890	6,812		230.7%
1900	8,448		24.0%
1910	10,734		27.1%
1920	10,008		−6.8%
1930	11,307		13.0%
1940	10,909		−3.5%
1950	10,922		0.1%
1960	10,387		−4.9%
1970	10,209		−1.7%
1980	9,824		−3.8%
1990	9,482		−3.5%
2000	9,291		−2.0%
2010	9,052		−2.6%
2020	8,491		−6.2%
U.S. Decennial Census

As of the census of 2000, there were 9,291 people, 4,220 households, and 2,253 families residing in the city. The population density was 2,309.4 people per square mile (891.7 people/km^{2}). There were 4,477 housing units at an average density of 1,112.8 units per square mile (429.7 units/km^{2}). The racial makeup of the city was 97.40% White, 0.48% Black or African American, 0.38% Native American, 0.52% Asian, 0.01% Pacific Islander, 0.32% from other races, and 0.89% from two or more races. Hispanic or Latino of any race were 1.68% of the population.

There were 4,220 households, out of which 26.3% had children under the age of 18 living with them, 37.0% were couples living together and joined in either marriage or civil union, 12.3% had a female householder with no husband present, and 46.6% were non-families. Of all households, 39.2% were made up of individuals, and 16.0% had someone living alone who was 65 years of age or older. The average household size was 2.14 and the average family size was 2.86.

In the city, the population was spread out, with 22.4% under the age of 18, 7.9% from 18 to 24, 29.5% from 25 to 44, 27.0% from 45 to 69, and 13.2% who were 65 years of age or older. The median age was 38 years. For every 100 females, there were 86.5 males. For every 100 females aged 18 and over, there were 82.6 males.

The median income for a household in the city was $30,393, and the median income for a family was $42,660. Males had a median income of $33,175 versus $20,319 for females. The per capita income for the city was $18,724. About 9.9% of families and 13.0% of the population were below the poverty line, including 16.2% of those under age 18 and 12.6% of those age 65 or over.

== Arts and culture ==
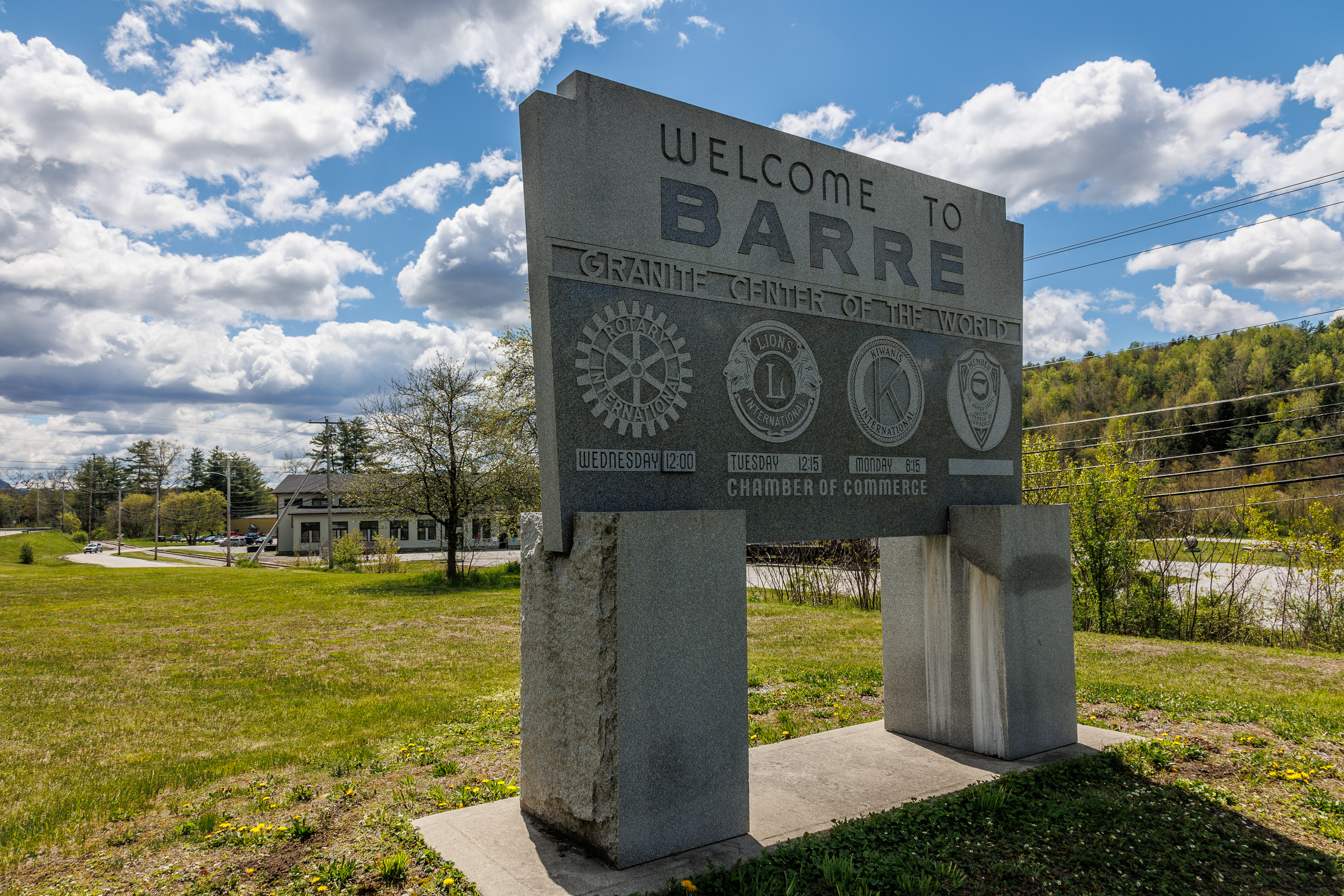
Welcome sign, cut from local granite

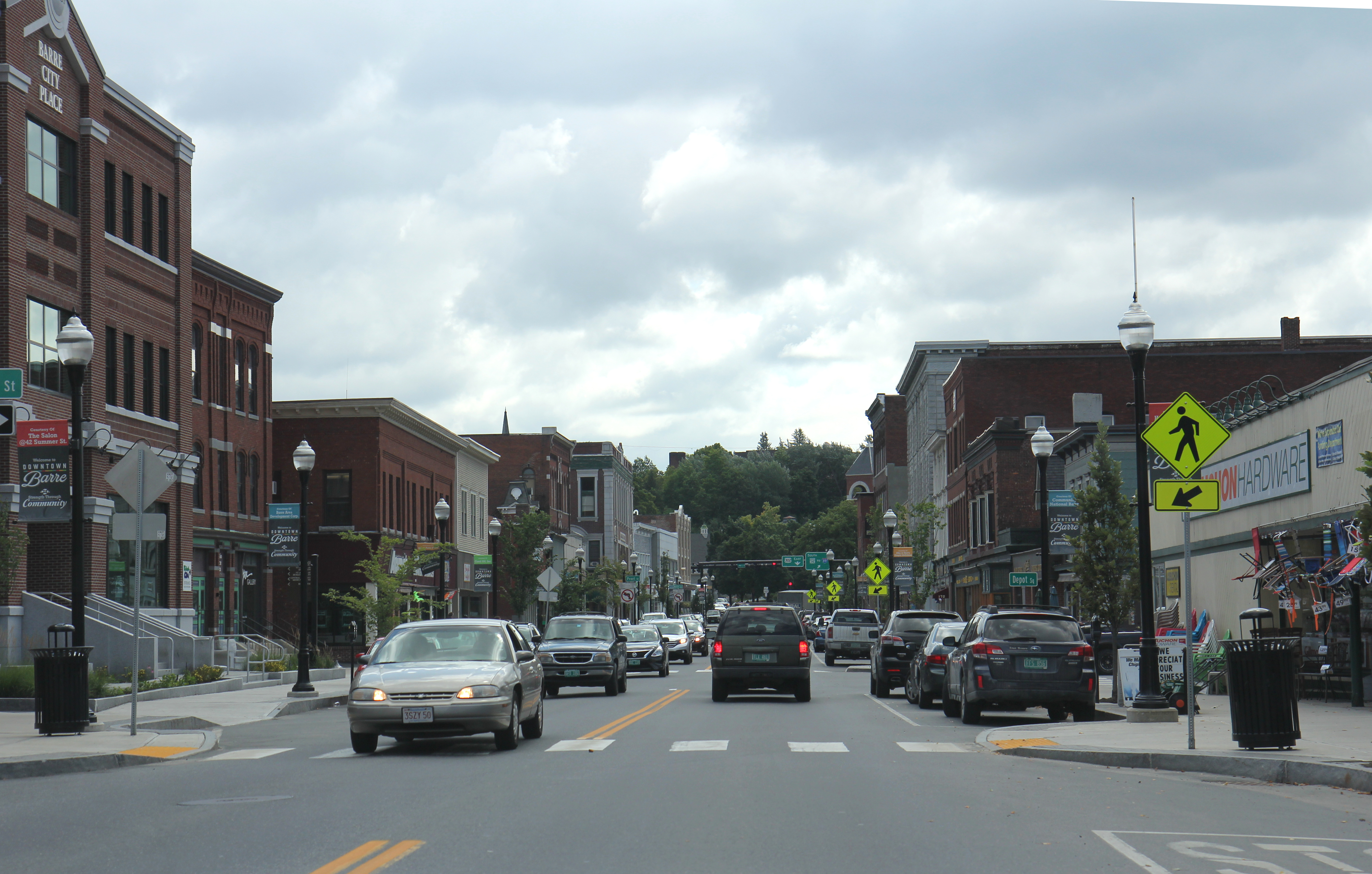
Downtown Barre

Alfred Hitchcock's movie The Trouble With Harry premiered at the Paramount Theater in Barre on September 27, 1955.

The original version of the Tony Award-winning musical Hadestown initially premiered in Barre in 2006.

Barre is also home to the following cultural landmarks:

- Barre Opera House
- Studio Place Arts
- Vermont Historical Society
- Vermont Granite Museum
- Summer Street Mural Project

== Government ==
Barre currently does not have a mayor, following the death of mayor Thom Lauzon on November, 16, 2026. Barre City has a "Council-Manager" form of government, and mayors serve two-year terms, with nonpartisan elections held in May (formerly March). The city is divided into three wards, and each ward elects two members of the city council. Councilors serve staggered two-year terms, so one council seat from each ward is up for election every March.

Barre City also elects a full-time city clerk and treasurer. The current Clerk and Treasurer is Cheryl Metivier. The city of Barre employs a full-time city manager. Nicolas Storellicastro currently holds this position.

== Sports ==
A Premier Basketball League (PBL) team, the Vermont Frost Heaves, played its games in Barre at the Barre Auditorium and at the Memorial Auditorium in Burlington, Vermont. The team was originally owned by Sports Illustrated writer Alexander Wolff. A local group later assumed ownership and operated the Heaves until the team ceased operations in late 2010 and subjected its players to a dispersal draft.

The Vermont Mountaineers, a collegiate summer baseball team which belongs to the New England Collegiate Baseball League, plays its home games at nearby Montpelier Recreation Field.

Team	Founded	Sport	League	Stadium
Vermont Frost Heaves	2005	Basketball	Premier Basketball League	Barre Auditorium Memorial Auditorium (Burlington)
Vermont Mountaineers	2003	Baseball	New England Collegiate Baseball League	Montpelier Recreational Field (Montpelier)

The quarter-mile, high-banked Thunder Road International Speedbowl is the premier motorsports venue in the state and associated with notable NASCAR figures Ken Squier and Dave Moody. Vermont Governor Phil Scott often participates in the track's "Governor's Cup 150" among other events. Thunder Road is also frequented by the American Canadian Tour late-model series of New England, New York, and southeastern Canada. The track, which is located in Barre Town, was built in 1958 and has been in operation since 1960.

== Parks and outdoor recreation ==
- City Hall Park
- Cow Pasture (natural area)
- Currier Park
- Canales Woods Park
- Dente Park
- Municipal Swimming Pool
- Rotary Park
- South Barre Bike Path

== Notable people ==
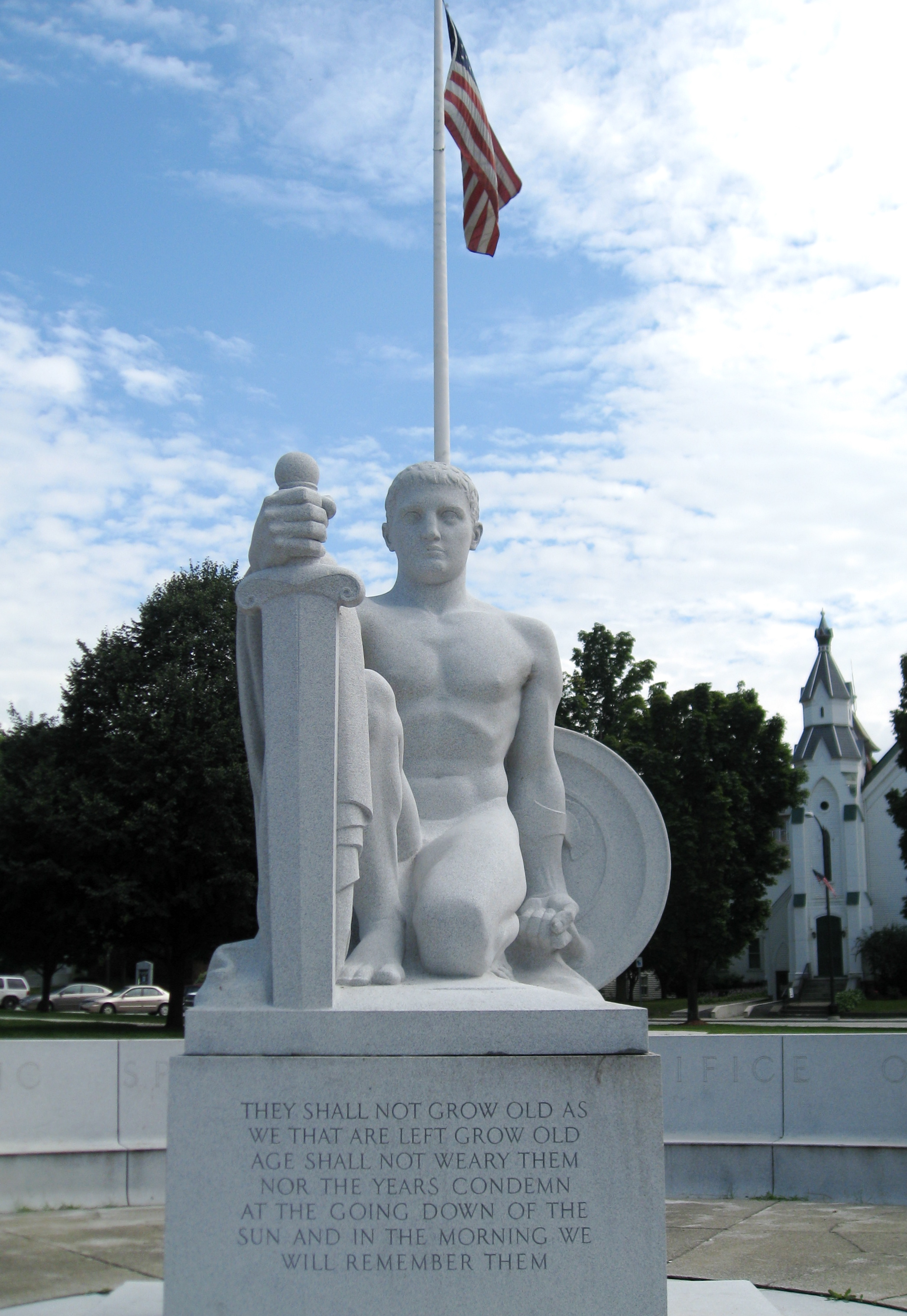
The Barre World War I Memorial, "Youth Triumphant", by sculptor C. Paul Jennewein

- Gayleen Aiken, artist
- Norman Anderson, athlete
- David Ball, NFL player
- Lucina C. Broadwell, murder victim
- Thomas H. Cave, Vermont State Treasurer
- Deane C. Davis, 74th governor of Vermont
- Ira Hobart Evans, Civil War era Medal of Honor recipient
- Young Firpo, boxer
- James Fisk, United States Senator and Congressman from Vermont
- Luigi Galleani, Italian anarchist
- Hollister Jackson, 54th lieutenant governor of Vermont
- Thomas D. Kinley, US Army major general, lived in Barre
- Jennifer McMahon, novelist
- James F. Milne, Secretary of State of Vermont
- Dave Moody, sportscaster
- Katherine Paterson, author
- Charles Poletti, 46th governor of New York
- Paul N. Poirier, member Vermont House of Representatives and Barre City Council
- Sheldon Clark Reed (1910–2003), biologist and geneticist, was born in Barre
- Richard Romanus, actor
- Phil Scott, 82nd governor of Vermont
- Socrates N. Sherman, member of the United States House of Representatives from New York
- Fred Swan, artist

== Mayors of Barre ==
Mayors of Barre since it was incorporated as a city include:

- Emery L. Smith, 1895–1896
- John W. Gordon, 1896–1900
- Harvey Hersey, 1900–1901
- Nelson D. Phelps, 1901–1902
- Charles W. Melcher, 1902–1903
- J. Henry Jackson, 1903–1904
- William Barclay, 1904–1907
- John Robins, 1907–1910
- James Mutch, 1910–1912
- Lucius H. Thurston, 1912–1913
- William H. Ward, 1913–1915
- Frank E. Langley, 1915–1916
- Robert Gordon, 1916–1917
- Eugene C. Glysson, 1917–1920
- Frank E. Langley, 1920–1922
- Waldron Shield, 1922–1926
- Frank L. Small, 1926–1928
- Nelson E. Lewis, 1928–1929
- Fred W. Suitor, 1929–1931
- Edwin Keast, 1931–1932
- William W. LaPoint, 1932–1934
- John A. Gordon, 1934–1939
- Edwin F. Heininger, 1939–1944
- Chauncey M. Willey, 1944–1954
- Reginald T. Abare, 1954–1956
- Cornelius O. Granai, 1956–1958
- George N. Estivill, 1958–1964
- Cornelius O. Granai, 1964–1966
- Garth W. Blow, 1966–1968
- Wilfred J. Fisher, 1968–1978
- Vergilio L. Bonacorsi, 1978–1982
- Robert S. Duncan, 1982–1984
- Robert A. Bergeron, 1984–1990
- Wilfred J. Fisher, 1990–1992
- Harry S. Monti, 1992–1996
- Paul A. Dupre, 1996–2000
- Harry S. Monti, 2000–2004
- Peter D. Anthony, 2004–2006
- Thomas J. Lauzon, 2006–2018
- Lucas J. Herring, 2018–2022
- Jake Hemmerick, 2022–2024
- Thomas J. Lauzon, 2024–2026

== See also ==
- Robert Burns Memorial
- Edward F. Knapp State Airport—Barre's airport (located in Berlin)
- Central Vermont Medical Center—Barre's hospital (located in Berlin)
- Spaulding High School (Barre, Vermont)—Barre's public high school
- Aldrich Public Library
- Waskowmium—large collection of artworks founded by Mark S. Waskow, who lives in Barre
