= Depot Square Historic District (Randolph, Vermont) =

Historic district in Vermont, United States

- U.S. National Register of Historic Places
- U.S. Historic district
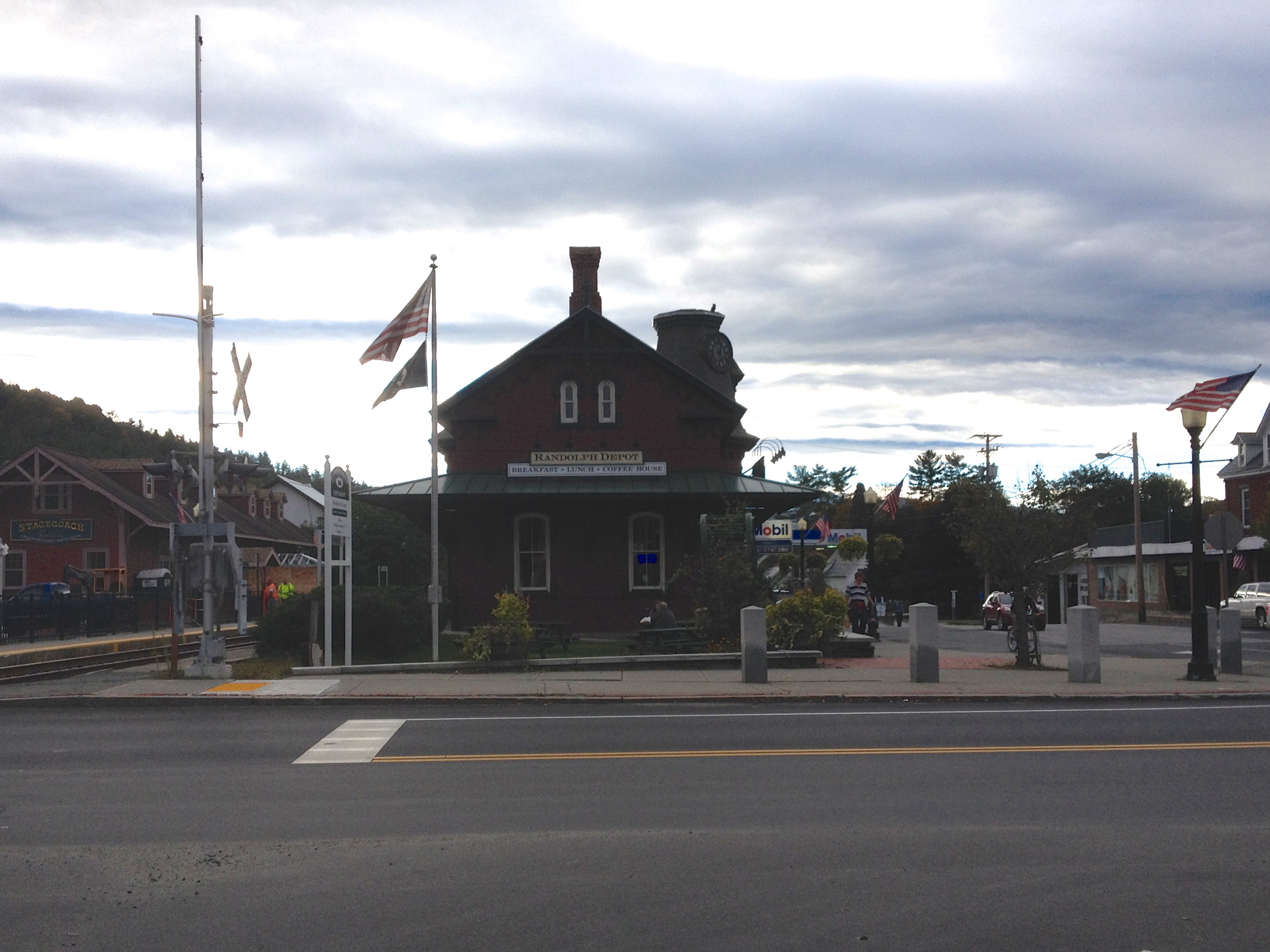
- Interactive map of Depot Square Historic District
- Location: Both sides of Main, Pleasant and Salisbury Sts., and both sides of Central Vermont Rwy. tracks, Randolph, Vermont
- Coordinates: 43°55′23″N 72°39′58″W
- Area: 12 acres (4.9 ha)
- Built: 1877
- Architectural style: Greek Revival, Late Victorian, Second Empire
- NRHP reference No.: 75000143
- Added to NRHP: May 29, 1975

The Depot Square Historic District encompasses the historic commercial business district of Randolph, Vermont. Developed in the mid-19th century around the facilities of the Central Vermont Railway, the area features a high concentration of well-preserved Second Empire and late Victorian commercial architecture. It was listed on the National Register of Historic Places in 1975.

== Description and history ==
The town of Randolph is located in the White River valley of central Vermont, roughly midway between Montpelier (the state capital) and White River Junction, a commercial and industrial center on the Connecticut River. It was originally centered on the banks of the White River in the western part of the town, about 0.5 miles (0.80 km) north of the present commercial business district. The Central Vermont Railway introduced service to the town in 1848, and its depot became the new focus for commercial and industrial activity. Most of the area's buildings date after 1875, with the current railroad station dating to 1877. Industrial buildings include the Randolph Coal and Ice Company building, and a large grain mill. Depot Square is lined with brick commercial buildings built in the 1870s and 1880s, that are fine examples of Second Empire and Late Victorian architecture.

The historic district is organized around the three sets of railroad tracks that run roughly east–west, roads that parallel them on either side (forming Depot Square), and stretches of Main Street (Vermont Route 12) and Pleasant Street that extend north from railroad crossing to their point of junction. The train depot is located at Salisbury and Main streets, and commercial buildings line Main and Salisbury streets, and Merchants Row in this area. Pleasant Street is lined on one side by predominantly residential buildings, and the other by the back sides of Main Street properties.

== See also ==
- National Register of Historic Places listings in Orange County, Vermont
