= Sparhawk =

Sparhawk may refer to:

== People ==
- Alan Sparhawk, American guitarist and vocalist with Low
- Bud Sparhawk (born 1937), American author
- Edward Vernon Sparhawk (1798–1838), American writer and poet
- Elizabeth Sparhawk-Jones (1885–1968), American painter
- Frances Campbell Sparhawk (1847–1930), American author
- Luther Tucker Sparhawk (1831–1918), American photographer

== Other ==
- An older or dialect name for the sparrowhawk
- Sparhawk Mill in Yarmouth, Maine
- Sparhawk, the main character in David Eddings series’, The Elenium and The Tamuli.
