= Jack Rowell (photographer) =

American photographer from Vermont

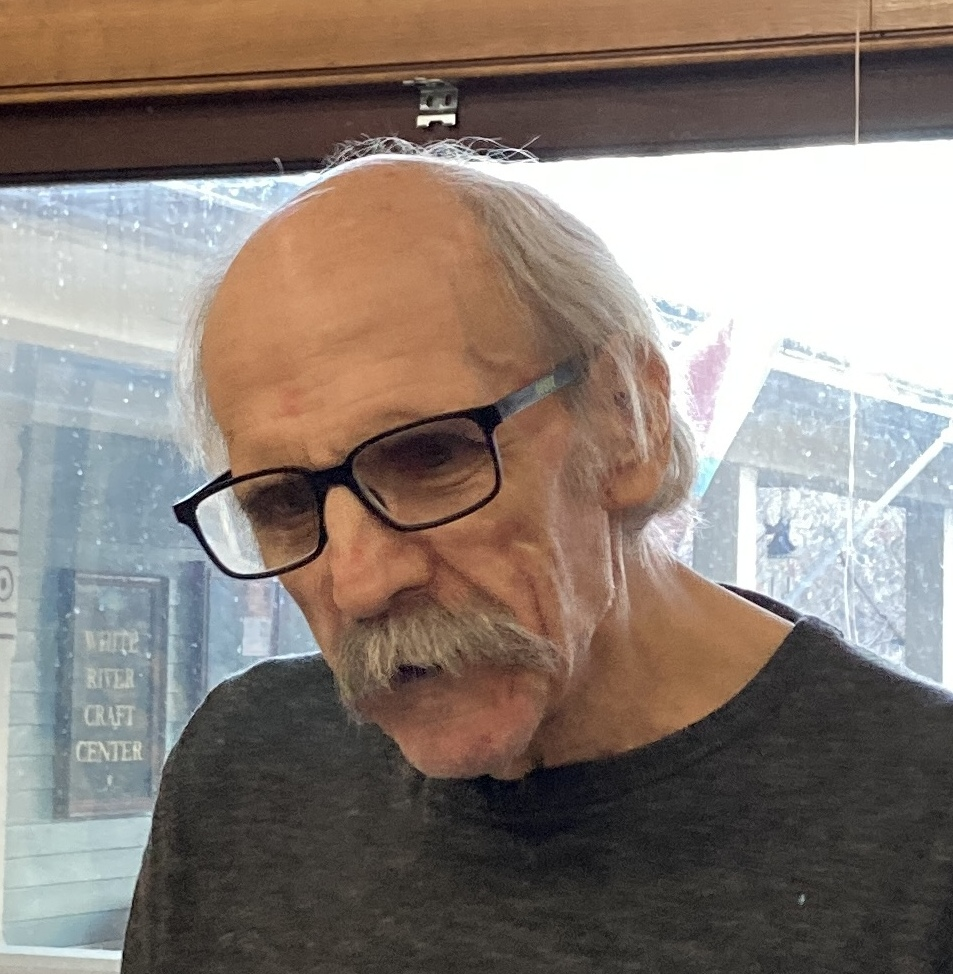
- Rowell in 2025
- Born: 1955 (age 70–71); Tunbridge, Vermont
- Known for: portrait photography
- Notable work: Tunbridge Fair, Hale Street Gang

Jack Rowell (born 1955) is an American photographer known for his portraiture of everyday Vermonters.

== Early life and education ==
Rowell was born in Tunbridge, Vermont and grew up in Groton and Randolph, Vermont. His father was a logger and his mother worked in a factory. He got a camera for Christmas as a child and began taking pictures, later moving to a Kodak Instamatic. In high school he started shooting on 35mm film and used the school's darkroom to process his images. He got a GED in 1973 and did manual labor jobs while selling photographs to a local newspaper, the White River Valley Herald, getting paid $1 a photo. The newspaper later published his first book, "Tunbridge Fair, Photographs by Jack Rowell" documenting the Tunbridge World's Fair where Rowell's father would sell coffee tables.

== Career ==
Rowell's focus as a photographer has been on documenting rural life in Vermont, what Vermont Sunday Magazine called "the Vermont you don't see in Vermont Life magazine." He began taking photographs of the Tunbridge Fair as a teenager using a friend's borrowed Petri camera. He continued to shoot images at the fair throughout the 1960s, 1970s and 1980s.

Rowell was associate producer for the local independent films Man with a Plan and Nosey Parker, claiming it was because "I had a light meter and the director didn't." The subject of the film, Fred Tuttle, made an actual run for U.S. Senate in 1998 and Rowell photographed him twice for People magazine and traveled on the road with him and director John O'Brien promoting the film. Of Tuttle, Rowell said "Fred was tough to photograph, but I knew how to do it because I knew him. His father and my great grandfather were friends and used to play bridge together."

He has done product and trade photography, including work for Vermont Castings, Phil Godenschwager, the Lake Champlain International Fishing Derby and Miss Vermont. His work has appeared in the Burlington Free Press, Time, Newsweek, The New York Times and the Economist. He has had exhibits at Dartmouth's Hopkins Center, AVA Gallery and the Chandler Art Gallery.

Rowell was the photographer for a traveling Vermont Folklife exhibit called "The Hale Street Gang", featuring "12 elderly participants in a memoir-writing workshop." Rowell met the 80- and 90-year-old memoirists at a local senior center event and enjoyed hearing their stories about places he'd known from his childhood. The exhibit featured audio recordings of their work paired with Rowell's photographs of them.

== Equipment ==
Rowell uses a Nikon D810 digital camera. For film cameras he has used Canon and Nikon 35mm cameras as well as a Mamiya camera for medium format and a Sinar camera for his large format portraits.

== Bibliography ==
- Tunbridge Fair, Photographs by Jack Rowell (1980)
- Jack Rowell Photographs (2025)
