= Carroll Ketchum =

American politician and businessman (1937–2022)

Member of the Vermont House of Representatives from the Windsor-Rutland-2 Vermont Representative District, 2002–2012 district
- In office 2001–2004
- Preceded by: Henry L. Holmes
- Succeeded by: Sandy Haas

Personal details
- Born: October 4, 1937 Randolph, Vermont
- Died: February 26, 2022 Bethel, Vermont
- Party: Vermont Republican Party, Republican Party (United States)
- Spouse: Marguerite Ketchum
- Children: Holly, Jay
- Parent(s): Francis W. and Mildred (Durocher) Ketchum
- Profession: Banker

Carroll F. Ketchum (October 4, 1937 – February 26, 2022) was an American politician and businessman.

Ketchum was born in Randolph, Vermont. He graduated from Whitcomb High School in Bethel, Vermont. Ketchum lived in Bethel with his wife and family. He worked in the banking business (Proctor Trust Company, Proctor Bank, Green Mountain Bank, and Mascoma Savings Bank). He was Bethel Town Moderator for 25 years. Ketchum served in the Vermont House of Representatives from 2001 to 2004.

== Vermont House of Representatives ==
Ketchum served as a State Representative for the Windsor-Rutland 2 district from 2001 to 2004. He was affiliated with the Republican party. After deciding not to run again in 2004, Progressive Sandy Haas went on to win his seat.

=== Primaries ===
- In 2000, Ketchum won 85% of the vote, beating his opponent, Frank C. Taplin, for the Republican nomination.
- In 2002, Ketchum won the Republican nomination uncontested.

=== Elections ===
- In 2000, Ketchum won his election receiving 52.5% of the vote. He beat his Democratic opponent, Ola O'Dell, and his Libertarian opponent, Larry Curtis.
- In 2002, Ketchum won 63.6% of the vote, beating his only opponent, Larry Curtis (running on a Liberty Unity ticket).
