= John K. Parish =

American politician

John Kimball Parish

Member of the Wisconsin State Assembly
- In office 1885–1885

Personal details
- Born: November 18, 1848 Randolph, Vermont, U.S.
- Died: June 1, 1932 (aged 83) Hermansville, Michigan, U.S.
- Party: Republican
- Education: University of Wisconsin
- Occupation: Jurist, politician, lawyer

John Kimball Parish (November 18, 1848 – June 1, 1932) was an American jurist and politician.

Born in Randolph, Vermont, Parish moved to Waupaca, Wisconsin in 1867. He graduated from University of Wisconsin in 1872, studied law, and was admitted to the Wisconsin bar in 1873. Parish then moved to Medford, Wisconsin, in 1873, and practiced law. In 1875, Parish was appointed district attorney of Taylor County, Wisconsin and was reelected to the office. In 1885, Parish served in the Wisconsin State Assembly and was a Republican. Parish was then elected Wisconsin Circuit Court judge and served twenty-four years. Parish died at his son's house in Hermansville, Michigan.
