= Calvin Edson =

American 19th century circus performer

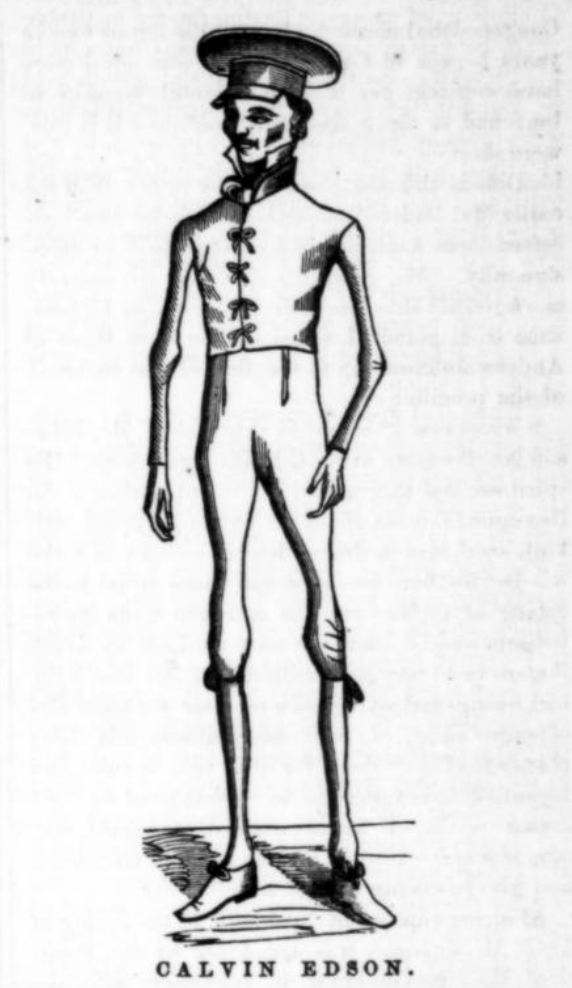
- Born: Stafford Connecticut
- Died: Randolph, Vermont
- Other names: General Bony Edson

Calvin Edson (born March 4, 1788) was an American man known for being the first well known "Living Skeleton" in American sideshows.

== Early life ==
Edson was born in 1788 in Stafford, Connecticut to Eliab and Prudence Edson and the family moved to Randolph, Vermont shortly after he was born. He was one of eleven children. He had one brother, Alexander, who was also emaciated in appearance.

Edson fought in the Battle of Plattsburgh as a member of the 11th Regiment. After a period of living outdoors with his regiment in 1814 he began to lose weight rapidly. He was 5 feet 3 or 4 inches tall and eventually reported to weigh only 45 pounds. Other than his emaciated appearance, he was in decent physical health.

== Sideshow performing ==
Edson performed as the Living Skeleton in circus shows, wearing a tight-fitting black suit, the first popular "skeleton" performer. In 1831 he traveled to Europe where his promotional materials said that he had been "introduced to the College of Physicians and Surgeons" in Paris where he was claimed to have been called "the greatest phenomena of nature the world has ever beheld." Edson traveled around the US with broadsheets announcing his performances where he put himself on display and also danced. These broadsheets had illustrations of Edson on them and were later reproduced in newspapers. He was said to have earned $15 a week for his work. He performed in a theater production as a character called Jeremiah Thin.

Edson's death was reported in newspapers nationwide in 1832 attributed to oculist John Scudder Jr. of Scudder's American Museum. It was claimed that his body was stolen from its tomb and inspected, and he was said "to have had a tapeworm twelve to fourteen feet in length." He was, in fact, alive and had just been on a short trip. Edson toured several museums in New York through the 1830s.

== Personal life ==
Edson was married to Rachael Cutler Edson in 1822 and had four children; two of his daughters were deaf and mute.
