= Randolph station (Vermont) =

Amtrak train station in Randolph, Vermont

Randolph, VT
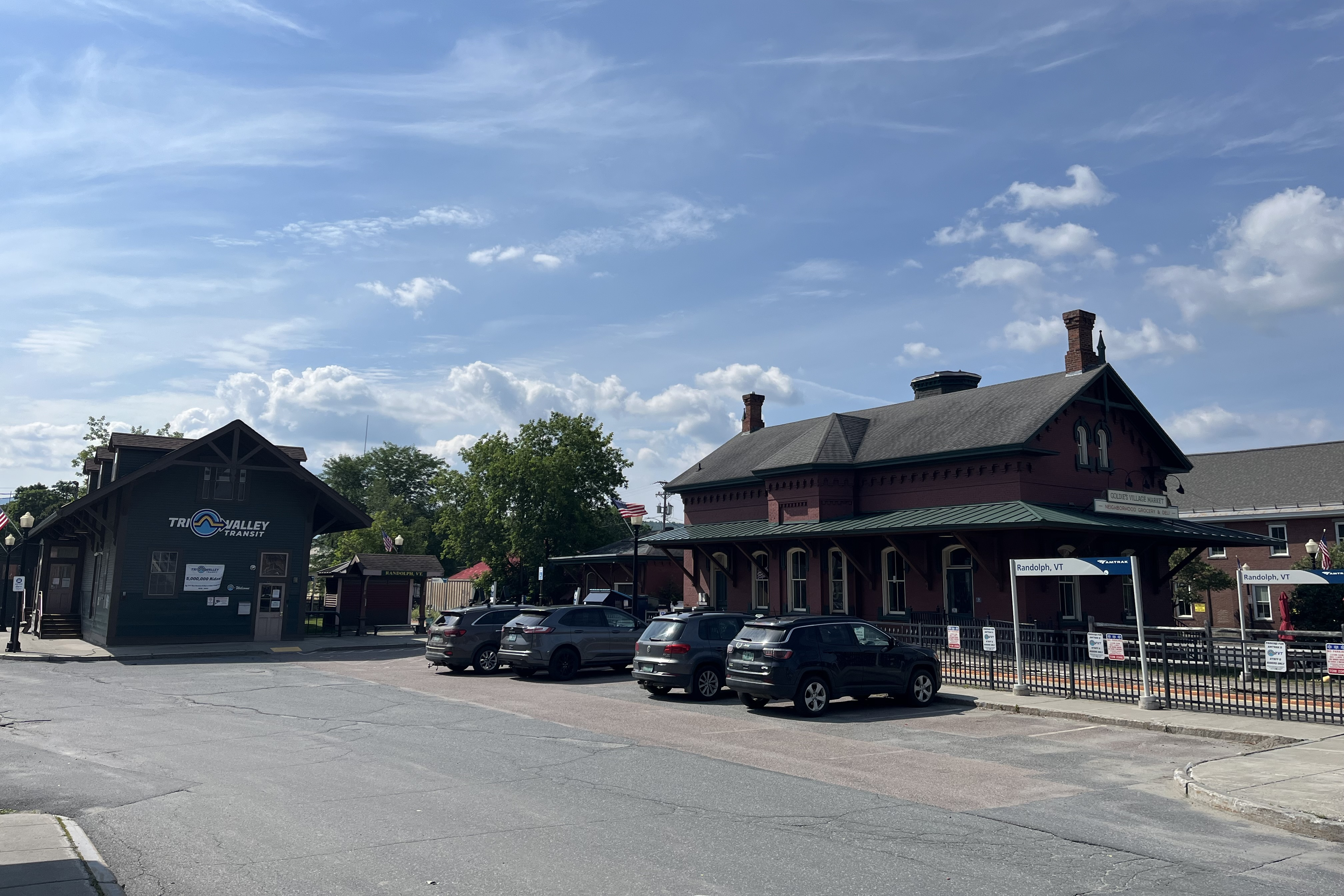
- Randolph station in 2026

General information
- Location: South Main Street and Salisbury Street; Randolph, Vermont; United States
- Coordinates: 43°55′22″N 72°39′57″W
- Owner: Randolph Depot Restaurant
- Line: New England Central Railroad
- Platforms: 1 side platform
- Tracks: 1
- Connections: Stagecoach Transportation

Construction
- Accessible: Yes

Other information
- Station code: Amtrak: RPH

History
- Opened: January 31, 1849 (Vermont Central Railroad); April 14, 1996 (Amtrak)
- Closed: 1966
- Rebuilt: 1877

Passengers
- FY 2025: 2,933 (Amtrak)

Services
Preceding station	Amtrak	Following station
White River Junction toward Washington, D.C.	Vermonter	Montpelier toward St. Albans
Former services
Preceding station	Central Vermont Railway	Following station
Bethel toward New London	Main Line	Braintree toward St. Johns
- Central Vermont Railway depot
- U.S. Historic district – Contributing property
- Location: South Main & Salisbury Streets; Depot Square; Randolph, Vermont
- Area: 12 acres (4.9 ha)
- Built: 1877
- Architectural style: Greek Revival, Late Victorian, Second Empire
- Part of: Depot Square Historic District (ID75000143)
- Designated CP: May 29, 1975
Location

Randolph station is an Amtrak train station in Randolph, Vermont, United States. The only train that serves the station is the Vermonter, which operates between St. Albans, Vermont and Washington, D.C. The former depot building contains a market and restaurant. On the other side of the tracks is the depot for a non-profit bus company, Tri-Valley Transit, essentially creating an unofficial intermodal transportation center. However, the schedules of the two systems are not aligned in any way.

== History ==
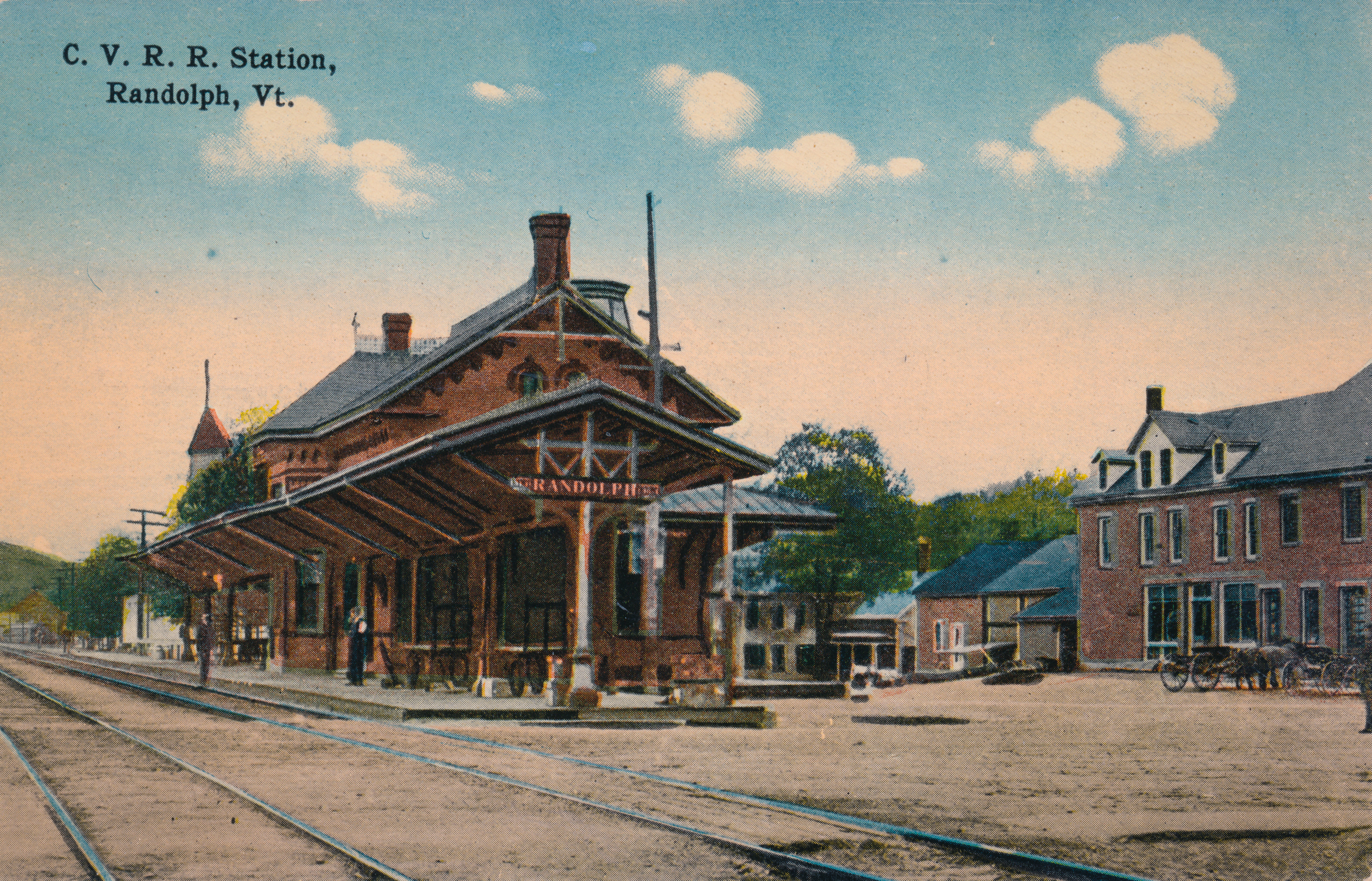
The station around 1915

The Vermont Central Railroad was chartered to build a line along the Connecticut River to Lake Champlain, which was to include service to Randolph. The original station was not built until 1848, by which time the VCRR was acquired by the Central Vermont Railway. By the late-1870s (although signs on the depot suggest 1881), Central Vermont moved the original depot and built a new one, converting the VCRR station into a freight house. When Central Vermont was on the verge of bankruptcy in 1896, the Grand Trunk Western Railroad, a subsidiary of Canadian National Railway bought the railroad and the station out and kept it afloat throughout most of the 20th Century.

Both passenger and freight service ended in Randolph in 1966. A group of volunteers later restored the stations and the surrounding area, including converting the second station into a café and restaurant.

Randolph Station became a contributing property to the Depot Square Historic District in 1975. In the 1990s, local leaders began lobbying Amtrak to make Randolph a new railroad stop, even going so far as to rebuild the original VCRR freight depot into a bus depot for Randolph Stagecoach Transportation, now Tri-Valley Transit. Amtrak began using the station as a stop on the Vermonter in 1996.
