= Tunbridge World's Fair =

Annual event in September in Tunbridge, Vermont

Coordinates: 43.888870°N 72.494806°W

The Tunbridge World's Fair is an annual event held in mid-September in Tunbridge, Vermont. The fair continues to this day with demonstrations of farming and agricultural traditions and culture, working antique displays, horse and ox pulling, harness racing, cattle and horse shows, junior exhibits, floral and 4-H exhibits, contra dancing, gymkhana, and many free shows.

== History ==
The Tunbridge World's Fair began in 1867 and has been held annually for 159 years. The first eight fairs were held in North Tunbridge, Vermont, while the following have been held in Tunbridge. The fair is currently chaired by Gordon Barnaby, who took over from Alan Howe in 2022 — who in turn had followed Euclid Farnham after the 2009 fair. Farnham had been president of the fair for over 30 years, and had made major efforts to change the fair from a "drunkards reunion," with "girlie-shows" (strip shows) and unlimited alcohol, to a more family-friendly environment. Some of the fair's earlier character was captured in a book of photography, Jack Rowell's Tunbridge Fair.

The fair was cancelled in 1917–18, again from 1942–44, and in 2020 (due to the COVID-19 pandemic).

== Operation ==
The fair is operated by a board of 100 shareholders. The shares were first sold in 1901 to raise funds for the fair's continued operation. Shares are passed through families and give the shareholders 1/100th ownership and a vote in fair proceedings. The fair, however, is a completely non-profit venture, and shareholders receive no portion of the fair's revenue.
