= Sandy Haas =

American politician

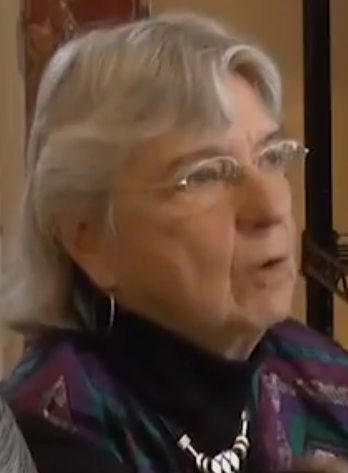

Member of the Vermont House of Representatives from the Windsor-Rutland-2 Vermont Representative District, 2002–2012 district
- In office 2005–2021
- Preceded by: Carroll Ketchum

Personal details
- Born: May 8, 1946 (age 80) Orange, California, U.S.
- Party: Vermont Progressive
- Spouse: David Marmor
- Education: University of California, Berkeley (BA); UC Berkeley School of Law (JD)
- Profession: Lawyer, innkeeper

Sandy Haas (born May 8, 1946) is a Vermont lawyer and innkeeper. Since 2005, she has served as a Progressive Party member of the Vermont House of Representatives representing the Windsor-Rutland-2 District.

== Background ==
Haas was born on May 8, 1946, in Orange, California. She got her B.A. at the University of California, Berkeley in 1968, and her J.D. from Boalt Hall in 1974. She moved to Rochester in Windsor County, Vermont in 1980, and lives there with her partner David Marmor. She is retired from her former private legal practice, and keeps The New Homestead Bed & Breakfast in Rochester.

== Political career ==
She has been a member of Rochester's Planning Commission since 1982, and served as a Trustee of Public Funds for Rochester from 1987 to 2003. In 2004, she was elected to the House of Representatives, and has served in that capacity ever since. She is assigned to the Corrections Oversight, Human Services and Judicial Rules committees, and is the present party caucus leader of the Progressives in the House.

== Education ==
Sandy Haas has received her education from the following institutions:

- JD, University of California, Berkeley, 1974
- BS, University of California, Berkeley, 1968

== Political experience ==
Sandy Haas has had the following political experience:

- Representative, Vermont State House of Representatives, 2004–present
- Progressive Leader, Vermont State House of Representatives, former

== Current Legislative Committees ==
Sandy Haas has been a member of the following committees:

- Government Accountability, Member
- Human Services, Vice Chair
- Judicial Rules, Member

== Caucuses/Non-Legislative Committees ==
Sandy Haas has been a member of the following committees: Chair, Rochester Planning Commission Rochester Trustee of Public Funds, 1987-2003

== Professional Experience ==
Sandy Haas has had the following professional experience:

- Innkeeper, New Homestead Bed & Breakfast
- Lawyer, Private Practice

== Organizations ==
Sandy Haas has been a member of the following organizations:

- Board Member, Clara Martin Center, 1982–98
- Board Member, White River Valley Players, 1984-2005
