= White River Valley Herald =

Newspaper published in Randolph Vermont

- Type: Weekly newspaper
- Publisher: Tim Calabro
- Editor: Tim Calabro
- Founded: 1874
- Headquarters: Randolph, Orange County, Vermont
- Circulation: 5,500
- ISSN: 2834-1791 (print); 2834-1805 (web)
- OCLC number: 38587151
- Website: ourherald.com

The White River Valley Herald is a weekly newspaper published in Randolph, Vermont, covering 16 communities in Vermont's Upper Valley region. Circulation was 5,500 in 2015.

== History ==
The Herald was established in 1874 by L.P. Thayer after purchasing the Green Mountain Herald, also published in Randolph. After an 1877 fire, the newspaper consolidated with the Chelsea Post, the Vermont News from Bethel, Vermont, and the Green Mountain Herald and was called The Herald and News. It was published in two editions, a four-page paper with only local news, and a slightly more expensive eight-page paper with "all the news." The newspaper had separate editions for the towns of Chelsea, Bethel and added editions for Rochester and South Royalton in 1894.

This newspaper was purchased by L.B. Johnson in 1894. The paper's current offices were built in 1899. In 1941 Johnson changed the name to The White River Valley Herald. Ownership of the paper passed to John Drysdale, who was publisher until 1971. In 1960 The Herald became the first newspaper in Vermont to use offset printing. The paper was published in house until 1994. Drysdale's son M. D. Drysdale took over the newspaper in 1971 and changed the name to The Herald of Randolph. Tim Calabro and his wife Katie Vincent-Roller, became the Herald's owners in June 2015 via the company Black White Red, LLC, which does business as The Herald of Randolph. Calabro had started at the paper as a photographer while he was still in high school.

In 2020 the newspaper changed its name back to the White River Valley Herald.

== Awards ==
The Herald won first place from the Vermont Press Association in 2013 for coverage of Hurricane Irene and its effect on the Upper Valley.

The New England Newspaper and Press Association said “The Herald is known as one of the best weeklies in New England and beyond” when they inducted M. D. Drysdale into their Hall of Fame.

== Online presence ==
The Herald has had a website since June 2000 where some content is behind a paywall. The paper also has a presence on Facebook and Instagram.
