= Phil Godenschwager =

American artist (b. 1949)

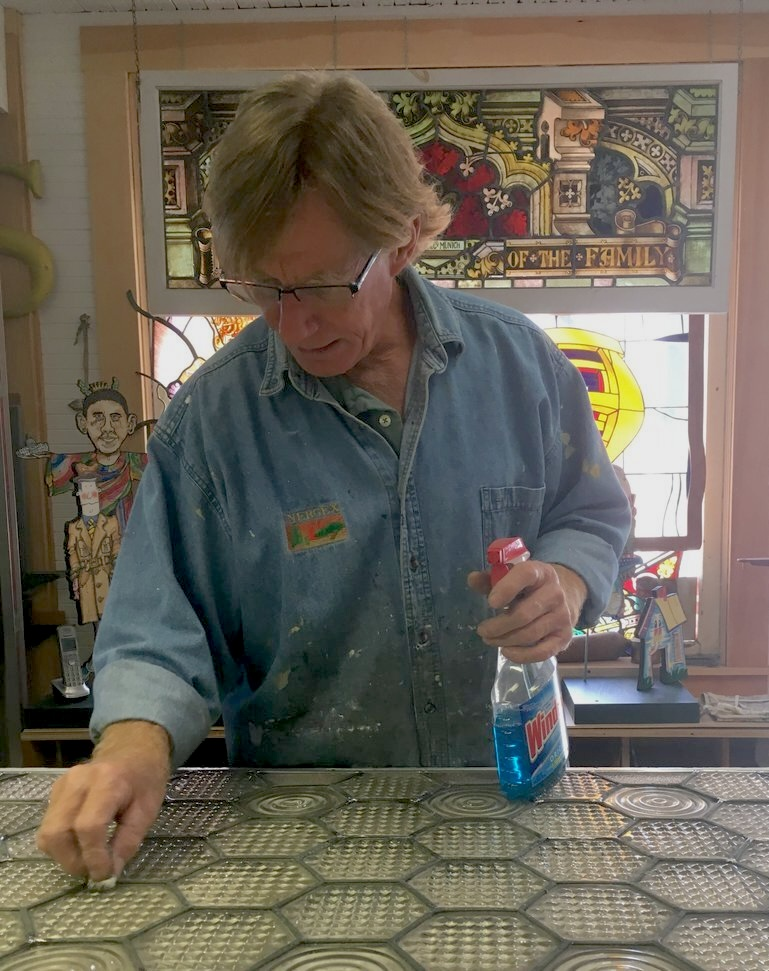
- Godenschwager in 2017
- Born: 1949 (age 76–77)
- Known for: stained glass, public art, commercial art
- Website: philgodenschwager.com

Phil "Flip" Godenschwager (born 1949) is an American artist and designer from Vermont working in stained glass and mixed-media sculpture.

== Early life and education ==
Godenschwager was born the son of a military officer. The family traveled for his work and Godenschwager "grew up all over the world." A lover of comics as a child, he began taking painting lessons in the Philippines when he was 8 and started showing his work when he was 12. He went to high school in Athens, Greece where he refined his drawing skills, and completed his high school education in the United States where he won the school art medal.

He joined ROTC in college but became disillusioned with the military in 1969 and pivoted towards working on ending the war in Vietnam. He graduated from Ohio University with a degree in graphic design and advertising in 1970 and moved to Vermont where he supported himself doing carpentry. He later earned an MFA in glass sculpture in the first graduating class at Vermont College in 1993.

== Career ==
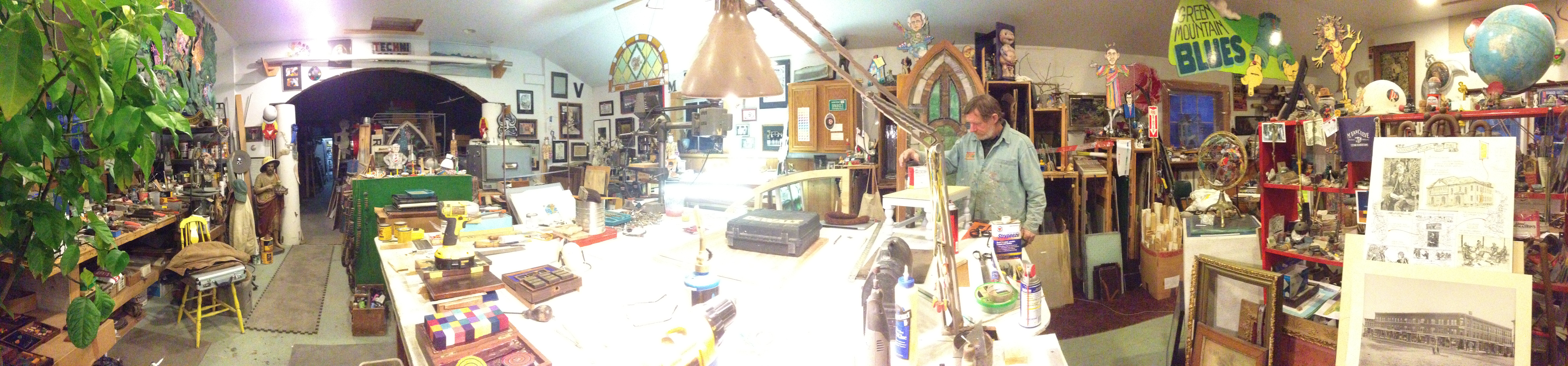
Godenschwager in his studio

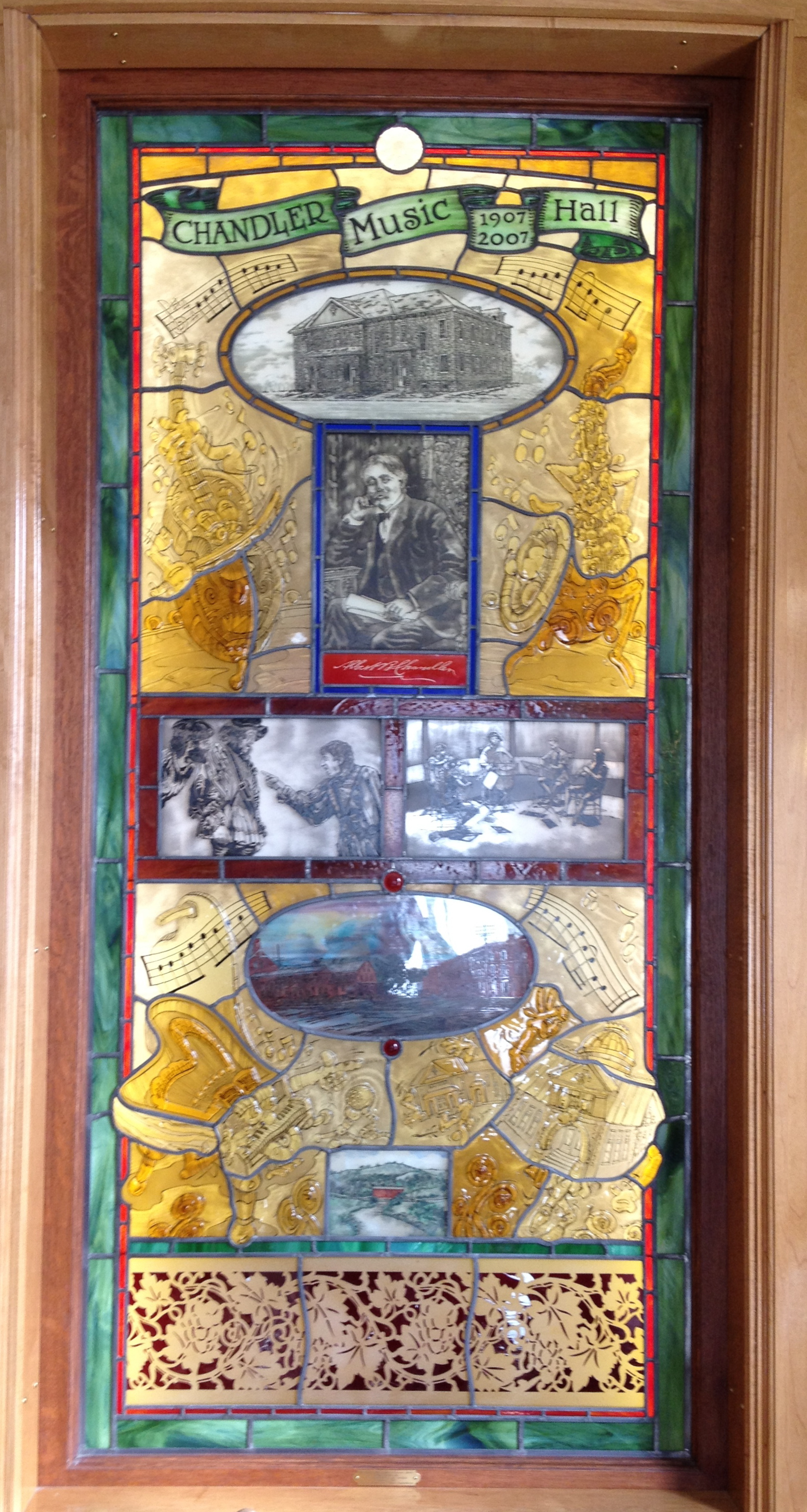
Chandler Music Hall artwork by Godenschwager

Godenschwager's early work was primarily commercial art. He did package design for Procter & Gamble, posters for rock concerts, and stove design for Vermont Castings. He lived in several places in the US including New Orleans and Washington state.

From 1979 to 1984, he worked for Montpelier's Great American Salvage Company until it closed, doing hundreds of stained glass restorations. He then traveled to the West Coast to study stained glass painting under Albinas Elskus at Pilchuck. After his return to Vermont he became creative director at Advanced Animations, providing art direction for their team of designers.

His best known piece may be the animated clock tower he designed and helped build for the FAO Schwarz flagship store in New York City when he worked at Advanced Animation; it was visible in the movie Big. He later consulted with Advanced Animations helping them create animatronic Jurassic Park dinosaurs for a theme park in China.

He designed another stained glass clock called "Season’s out of Time" for the South Burlington City Hall building. The hands of the clock are surrounded by a spiral of maple leaves in shifting colors mimicking the changing of the seasons.

Godenschwager's work is often large in scale. In 2010 he was one of 38 artists selected to decorate a life-sized cow in Burlington's "The Cows Come Home to Burlington" citywide art installation. He designed, built, and installed a sixteen-panel set of windows for the chapel at the Vermont Veterans Memorial Cemetery and created a 100-square foot stained glass skylight for the Burlington Public Works Department. He created a 45 foot long twenty-panel hand-painted stained glass installation called "Window to the Rails" depicting a Norfolk & Western Class J 611 steam engine pulling a train for the O. Winston Link Museum in Roanoke, Virginia. The work took him nearly two years to complete, containing over 400 pieces of glass, all hand-painted and kiln-fired; Godenschwager installed it himself.

Another train project was his public art piece "The Waterbury Special", an award-winning design which came out of the Waterbury Rail Art Project. It's a 60-foot-long two-dimensional backlit aluminum train, installed on a New England Central Railroad bridge in Waterbury, Vermont. The train is made up of historic buildings from the town of Waterbury and was Godenschwager's first large-scale project in metal.

In 2020, Godenschwager was chosen to be the inaugural muralist for Randolph's mural walk. Godenschwager attributes his success to a workmanlike approach to his art, working eight hours a day, Monday through Friday, in his Randolph studio, Atlantic Art, Glass and Design, which he opened in 1988. While his signature style is painted and intricate glass work, he has also worked in cartooning, mixed-media sculpture, painting and ink illustration. He describes his influences as ranging from Walt Disney to Walt Kelley to R. Crumb.

== Political artwork ==
In addition to his commercial and commissioned work, he often does illustrations with a more political bent. He did a commissioned artwork for a Vermont Arts Council project Art of Action, the state's largest commissioned visual art project since the WPA. Godenschwager created several large carved foam panels which were hand-painted to show scenes of Vermont. In one, "The Great Wall of Vermont" the state of Vermont is represented as a green rectangle surrounded by encroaching stores and other development.

As a response to the BP oil spill he created a drawing featuring the Capitol building sinking below discolored Gulf waters; he calls it "Mission Accomplished." In another mixed-media piece about 9/11 called “It Just So Happened, That Day, the Whole World Was Watching,” a hollowed-out television set rests on legs resembling the twin towers. The television's innards are replaced with "a crowd of toys — from Mr. Potato Head to Felix the Cat — reenact[ing] the famous photo from Tiananmen Square: a tiny cowboy on a white horse staring down the barrel of a toy tank."

== Example works ==
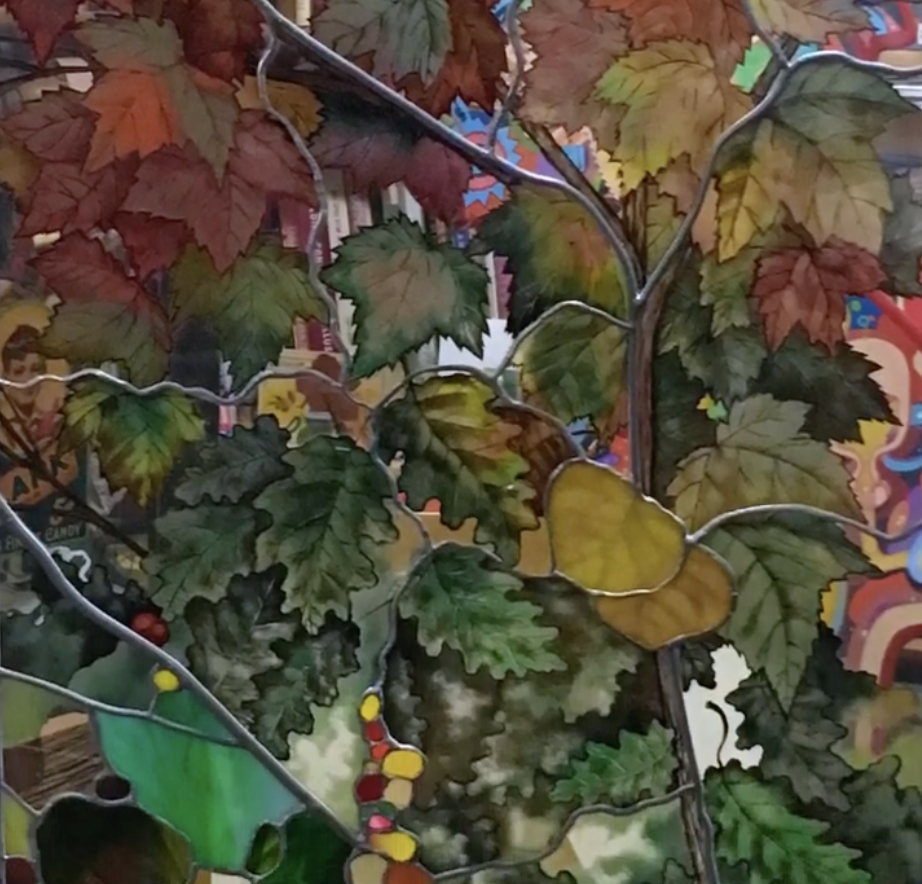
Detail of stained glass artwork

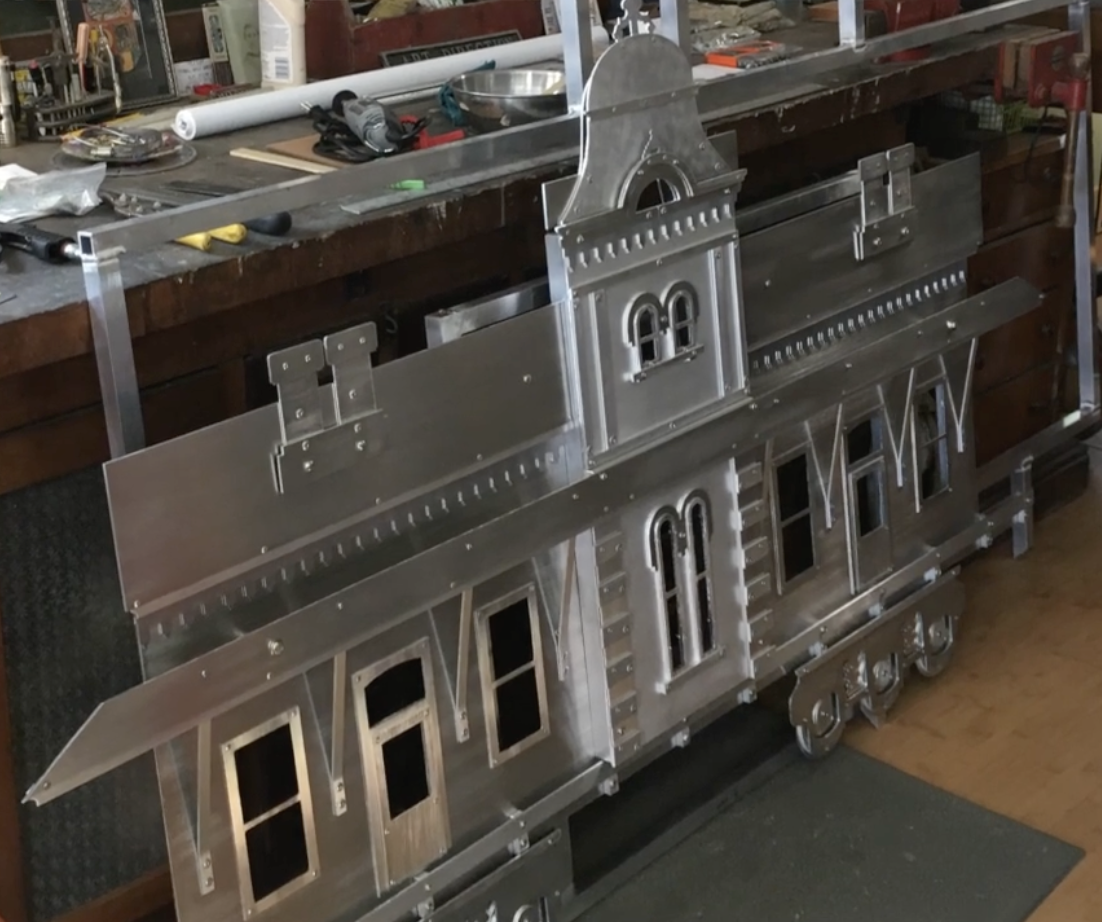
One "car" from The Waterbury Special

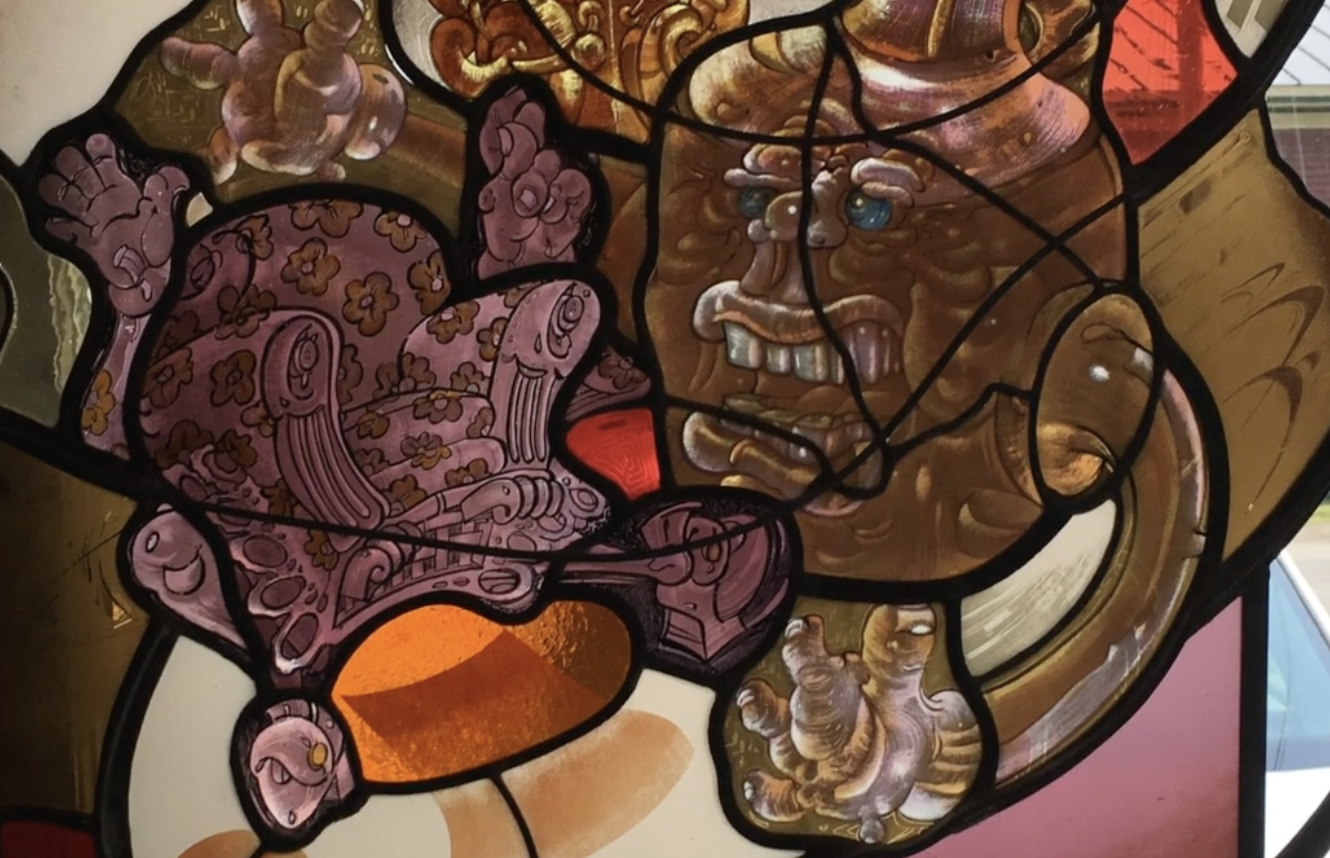
Detail of stained glass artwork
