= Randolph (CDP), Vermont =

Census-designated place in Vermont, United States

Randolph, Vermont
- Census-designated place
- Location within Vermont Location within the United States
- Coordinates: 43°55′34″N 72°40′18″W
- Country: United States
- State: Vermont
- County: Orange
- Town: Randolph

Area
  - Total: 4.51 sq mi (11.69 km^{2})
  - Land: 4.47 sq mi (11.59 km^{2})
  - Water: 0.039 sq mi (0.10 km^{2})
- Elevation: 650 ft (200 m)

Population (2020)
  - Total: 2,083
- Time zone: UTC-5 (Eastern (EST))
  - Summer (DST): UTC-4 (EDT)
- ZIP Code: 05060
- Area code: 802
- FIPS code: 50-58000
- GNIS feature ID: 2586650

Randolph is the primary village and a census-designated place (CDP) in the town of Randolph, Orange County, Vermont, United States. As of the 2020 census, it had a population of 2,083, out of 4,774 in the entire town of Randolph.

== Geography ==
The CDP is in southwestern Orange County, in the southwestern corner of the town of Randolph. It is bordered to the east by the Third Branch of the White River and its tributary Ayers Brook, all part of the Connecticut River watershed.

Vermont Route 12 passes through the center of the village as its Main Street, leading north through Brookfield Gulf 17 miles (27 km) to Northfield and south 7 miles (11 km) to Bethel. Vermont Route 12A departs Route 12 in Randolph and leads northwest, then north and northeast 22 miles (35 km) to Northfield. Vermont Route 66 has its western terminus in Randolph and leads east 3 miles (5 km) to Randolph Center and 7 miles (11 km) to East Randolph. Interstate 89 passes 2 miles (3 km) east of Randolph, accessible from Route 66.

The New England Central Railroad passes through the village, with Amtrak passenger service available from Randolph station in the village center.
