= Frances Campbell Sparhawk =

American author

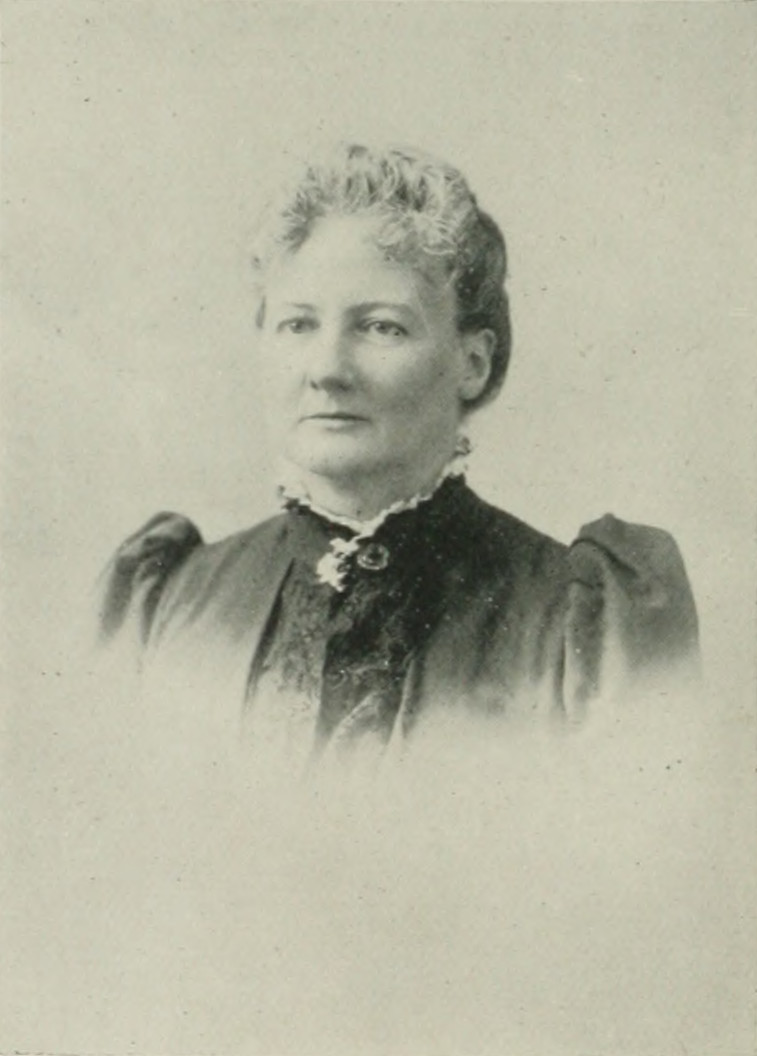
- Born: July 28, 1847; Amesbury
- Died: January 9, 1930 (aged 82); Brookline
- Occupation: Writer

Frances Campbell Sparhawk (July 28, 1847 – January 9, 1930) was an American author.

Frances Campbell Sparhawk was born on July 28, 1847, in Amesbury, Massachusetts. Her education was received in private schools. The poet Whittier was an early and intimate friend of her father, Dr. Thomas Sparhawk. She has published a large number of serial stories in The Christian Union and The Bay State Monthly. Her most important contribution to serial fiction is entitled "Elizabeth," a romance of colonial days, and describes New England and the siege of Louisburg. This appeared in The Bay State Monthly. She is also the author of A Lazy Man's Work (New York, 1881), Little Polly Blatchley (Boston, 1887), Miss West's Class in Geography (1887), and the Dorothy Brooke series of books for young adult girls. Frances Campbell Sparhawk died on January 9, 1930, in Brookline, Massachusetts.
