= Randolph, Vermont =

- Town
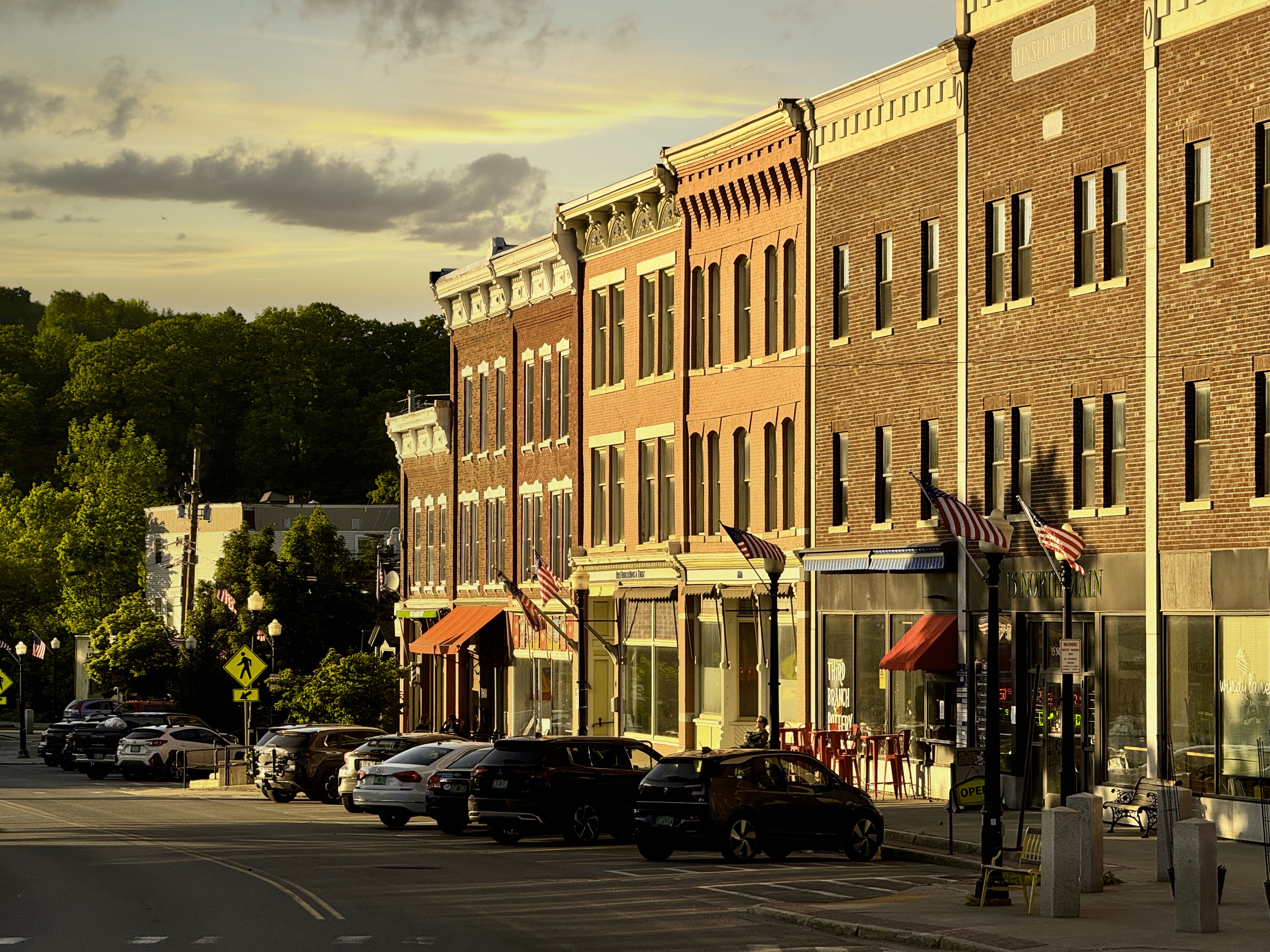
- Downtown Randolph

- Flag
- Motto: "The Heart of Vermont"
- Randolph town boundaries
- Coordinates: 43°56′14″N 72°36′23″W
- Country: United States
- State: Vermont
- County: Orange
- Chartered: 1781 (Vermont)
- Communities: Randolph; Randolph Center; East Randolph; North Randolph; South Randolph

Area
  - Total: 47.9 sq mi (124.1 km^{2})
  - Land: 47.9 sq mi (124.0 km^{2})
  - Water: 0.039 sq mi (0.1 km^{2})
- Elevation: 1,371 ft (418 m)

Population (2020)
  - Total: 4,774
  - Density: 99.71/sq mi (38.50/km^{2})
  - Households: 1,783
  - Families: 1,066
- Time zone: UTC−5 (EST)
  - Summer (DST): UTC−4 (EDT)
- ZIP Codes: 05041 (East Randolph); 05061 (Randolph Center); 05060 (Randolph)
- Area code: 802
- FIPS code: 50-58075
- GNIS feature ID: 1462182
- Website: randolphtownvt.org

Randolph is a town in Orange County, Vermont, United States. The population was 4,774 at the 2020 census, making Randolph the largest town in Orange County. The town is a commercial center for many of the smaller, rural farming communities that surround it.

When the area was originally settled there were three villages—Randolph Center, East Randolph and West Randolph—the current locations of the three fire departments. What is now Randolph, the primary village of the town, had previously been the village of West Randolph.

== History ==
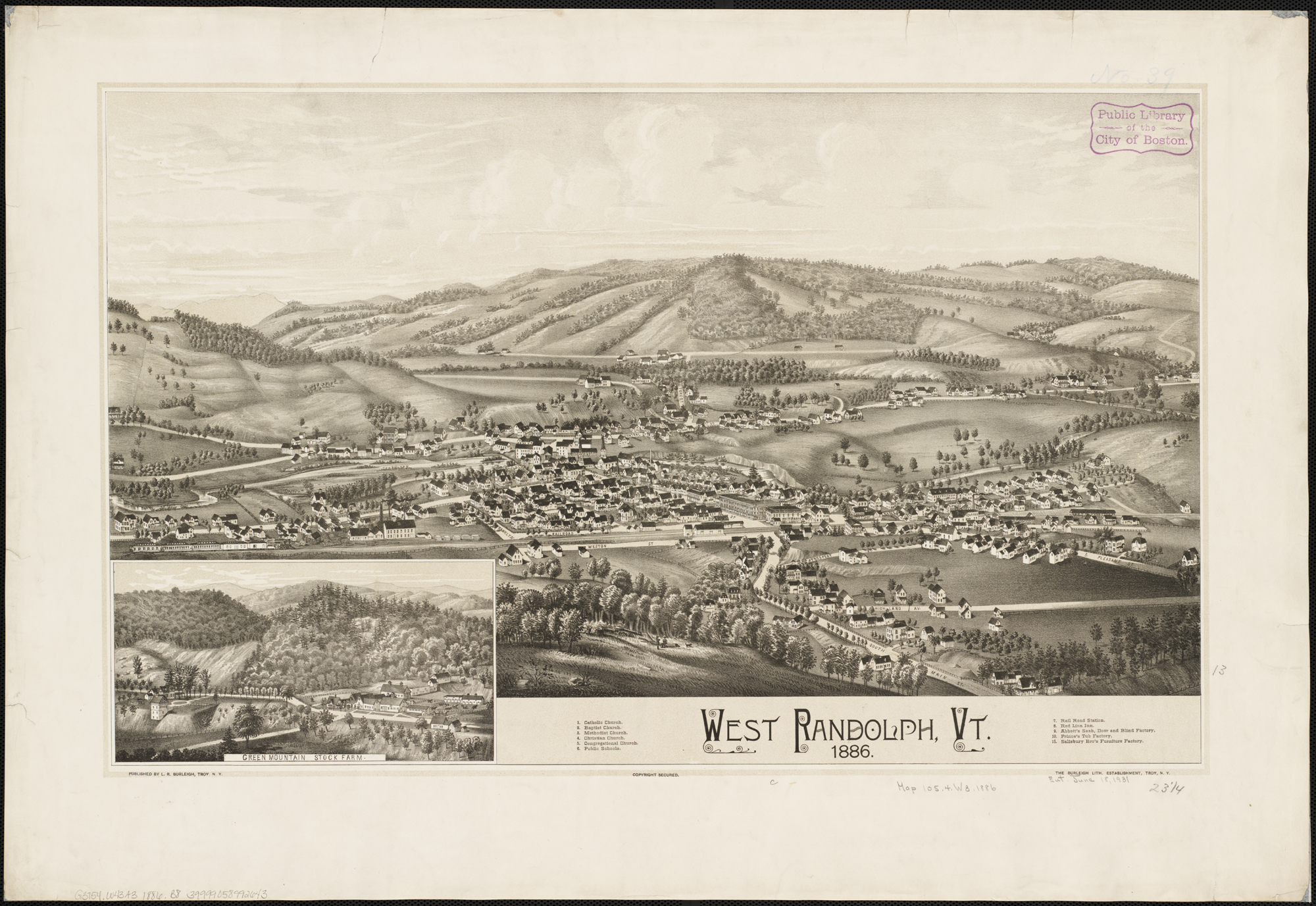
Print of West Randolph from 1886 by L.R. Burleigh with listing of landmarks

Vermont granted the town on November 2, 1780, when the New Hampshire settlers could not locate the original grantees, whose patents were issued by New York. It was chartered on June 29, 1781, to Aaron Storrs and 70 others, and was originally named "Middlesex".

The town was first settled c. 1778, when Vermont was an unrecognized state whose government existed in defiance of the government of New York, which claimed Vermont was a part of New York. To encourage recognition of the state by the United States, the town was renamed in honor of Edmund Randolph, one of the Founding Fathers of the United States.

With productive soil for cultivation, farming became an intensive industry. By 1830, when the population reached 2,743, between twelve and thirteen thousand sheep grazed its pastures. Randolph was noted for its good butter, cheese and mutton.

Two branches of the White River provided water power for watermills. By 1859, the town had three gristmills, one oil mill, and one carding mill. In 1848, the Vermont Central Railroad opened service through the town. Randolph's prosperity during the Victorian era endowed it with some fine architecture, including the Second Empire Randolph Railroad Depot and Renaissance Revival Kimball Public Library.

In 1921, Randolph was the setting for, and provided some of the cast of, a silent movie called The Offenders. In 1922, the same was true for the film Insinuation.

Today, Randolph is a thriving meeting-spot and shopping center for the surrounding area. The town is home to attractions such as the Porter Music Box Museum and the Chandler Music Hall. Also located in Randolph are the Gifford Medical Center, a hospital; Dubois & King, a civil and structural engineering firm; and Randolph Union High School, which also serves students from the neighboring towns of Braintree and Brookfield. Downtown Randolph hosts the Amtrak station, shops, restaurants, Playhouse Movie Theatre, and several gas stations.

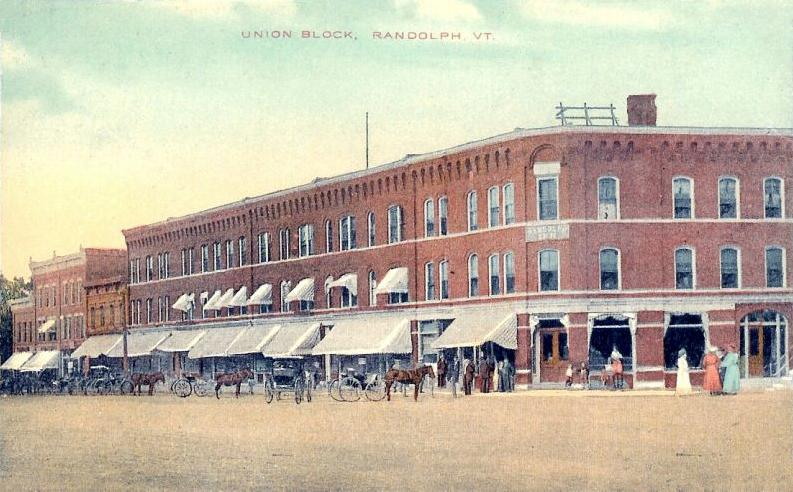
Union Block in 1912

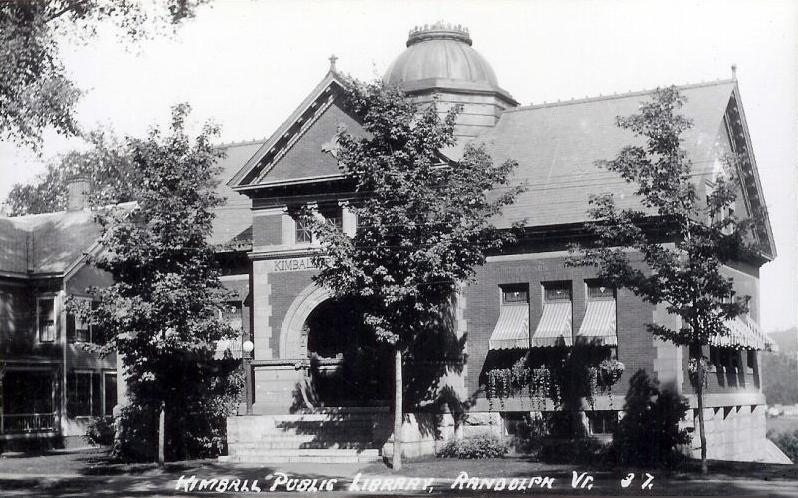
Kimball Library c. 1915

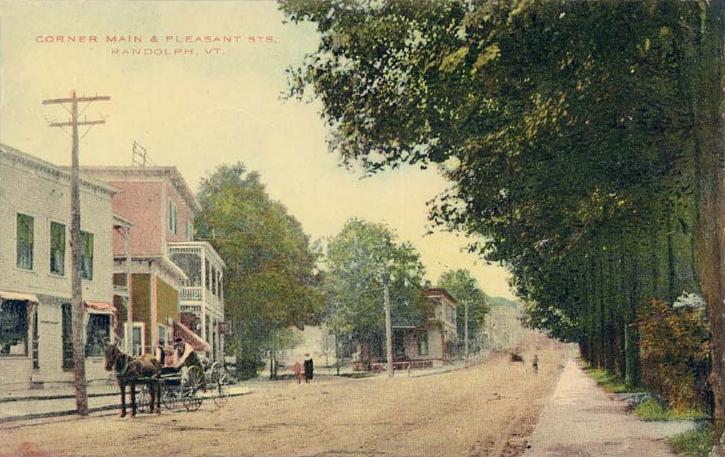
North Main Street in 1913

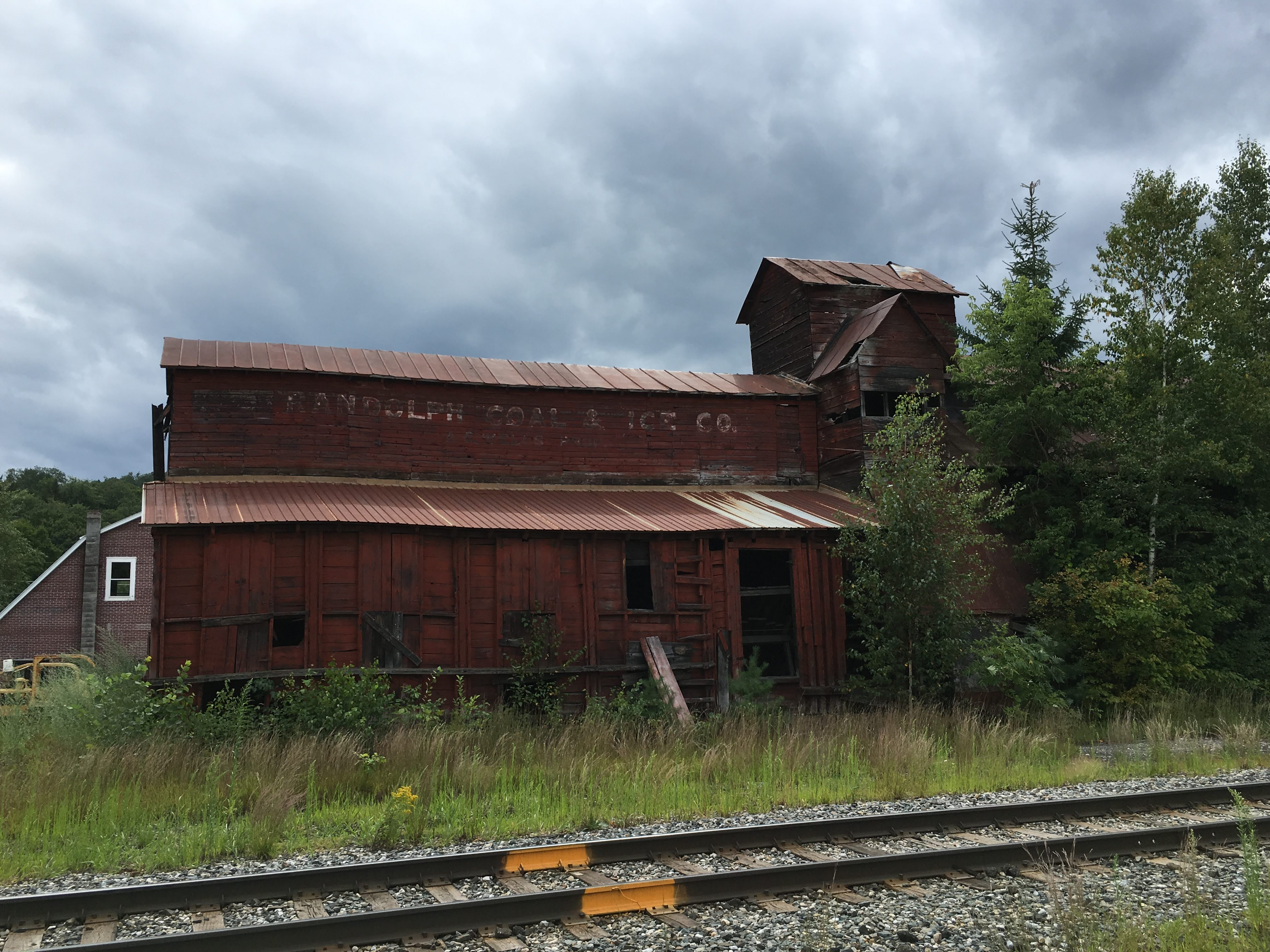
Randolph Coal & Ice Company

== Geography ==
According to the United States Census Bureau, the town has a total area of 47.9 square miles (124.1 km^{2}), of which 47.9 square miles (124.0 km^{2}) is land and 0.04 square mile (0.1 km^{2}) (0.08%) is water. Randolph is drained by the second and third branches of the White River.

== Demographics ==
Historical population
Census	Pop.	Note	%±
1790	892		—
1800	1,841		106.4%
1810	2,255		22.5%
1820	2,487		10.3%
1830	2,743		10.3%
1840	2,678		−2.4%
1850	2,666		−0.4%
1860	2,502		−6.2%
1870	2,829		13.1%
1880	2,910		2.9%
1890	3,232		11.1%
1900	3,141		−2.8%
1910	3,191		1.6%
1920	3,010		−5.7%
1930	3,166		5.2%
1940	3,278		3.5%
1950	3,499		6.7%
1960	3,414		−2.4%
1970	3,882		13.7%
1980	4,689		20.8%
1990	4,764		1.6%
2000	4,853		1.9%
2010	4,778		−1.5%
2020	4,774		−0.1%

As of the census of 2000, there were 4,853 people, 1,769 households, and 1,144 families residing in the town. The population density was 101.4 people per square mile (39.2/km^{2}). There were 1,905 housing units at an average density of 39.8 per square mile (15.4/km^{2}). The racial makeup of the town was 97.77% White, 0.21% African American, 0.14% Native American, 0.60% Asian, 0.08% Pacific Islander, 0.02% from other races, and 1.17% from two or more races. Hispanic or Latino of any race were 0.54% of the population.

There were 1,769 households, out of which 31.5% had children under the age of 18 living with them, 50.9% were couples living together and joined in either marriage or civil union, 9.6% had a female householder with no husband present, and 35.3% were non-families. 27.7% of all households were made up of individuals, and 12.6% had someone living alone who was 65 years of age or older. The average household size was 2.45 and the average family size was 3.00.

In the town, the population was spread out, with 23.3% under the age of 18, 15.9% from 18 to 24, 23.8% from 25 to 44, 23.1% from 45 to 64, and 13.9% who were 65 years of age or older. The median age was 36 years. For every 100 females, there were 103.1 males. For every 100 females age 18 and over, there were 105.4 males.

The median income for a household in the town was $41,283, and the median income for a family was $50,756. Males had a median income of $31,353 versus $25,160 for females. The per capita income for the town was $20,591. About 5.3% of families and 7.9% of the population were below the poverty line, including 7.7% of those under age 18 and 7.5% of those age 65 or over.

== Education ==
The Randolph campus of Vermont State University is located in Randolph Center. Formerly known as Vermont Technical College, it merged with Northern Vermont University and Castleton University to form VSU in 2023.

Two public schools operated by the Orange Southwest Supervisory Union serve Randolph.

- Randolph Elementary School K–6
- Randolph Union High School, grades 7–12

== Transportation ==
=== Roads and highways ===
Randolph is served by five state-maintained routes. Interstate 89 passes through Randolph and has one exit near the center of town. Paralleling the Interstate are Vermont Route 12, which passes through downtown Randolph and the western half of town, and Vermont Route 14, which passes through the eastern half of town. East-west Vermont Route 66, which is located entirely within Randolph, connects all three of those north-south routes. Vermont Route 12A splits from Vermont Route 12 just north of downtown Randolph and heads to the northwest to enter Braintree.

=== Public transportation ===
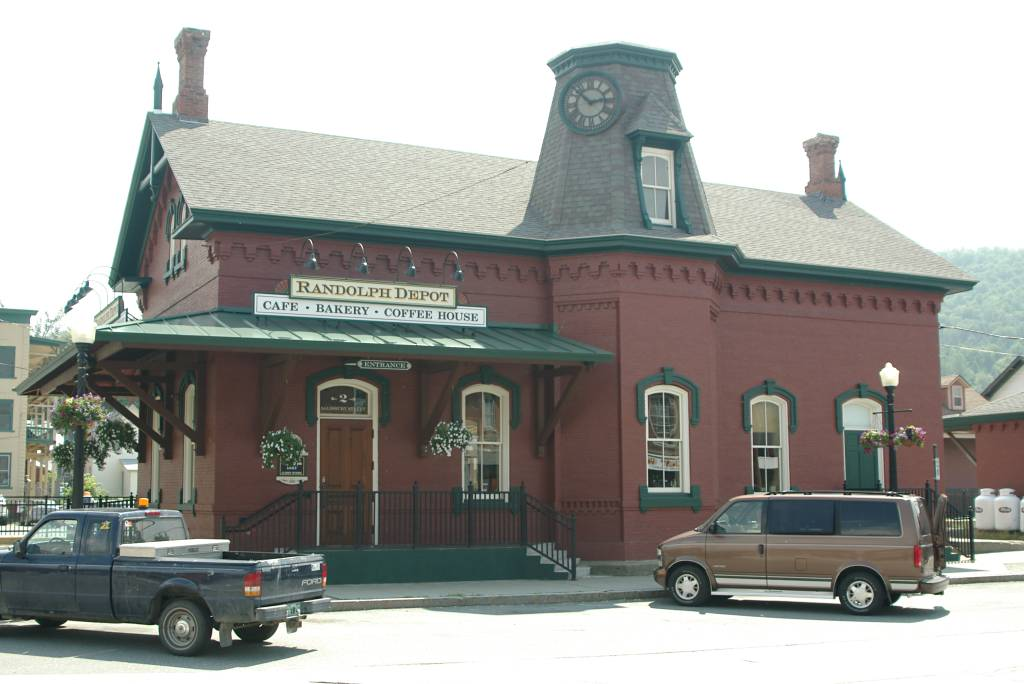
Randolph Railroad Depot

Amtrak, the national passenger rail system, provides daily service to Randolph, operating its Vermonter between Washington, D.C. and St. Albans, Vermont. Tri-Valley Transit provides local bus transportation across town, Orange County and to and from the White River Junction and Lebanon, New Hampshire areas.

== Media ==
=== Weekly newspaper ===
The White River Valley Herald

=== Radio ===
- WWFY – 100.9 FM (Froggy 100.9 FM – Today's BIG Country)
- WRFK – 107.1 FM (107.1 Frank FM – Classic Rock)
- WCVR – 1320 AM (Real Country 1320 – country)
- WVXR – 102.1 FM (VPR Classical)
- WVTC – 90.7 FM (Vermont Tech Radio – various music)

== Sites of interest ==
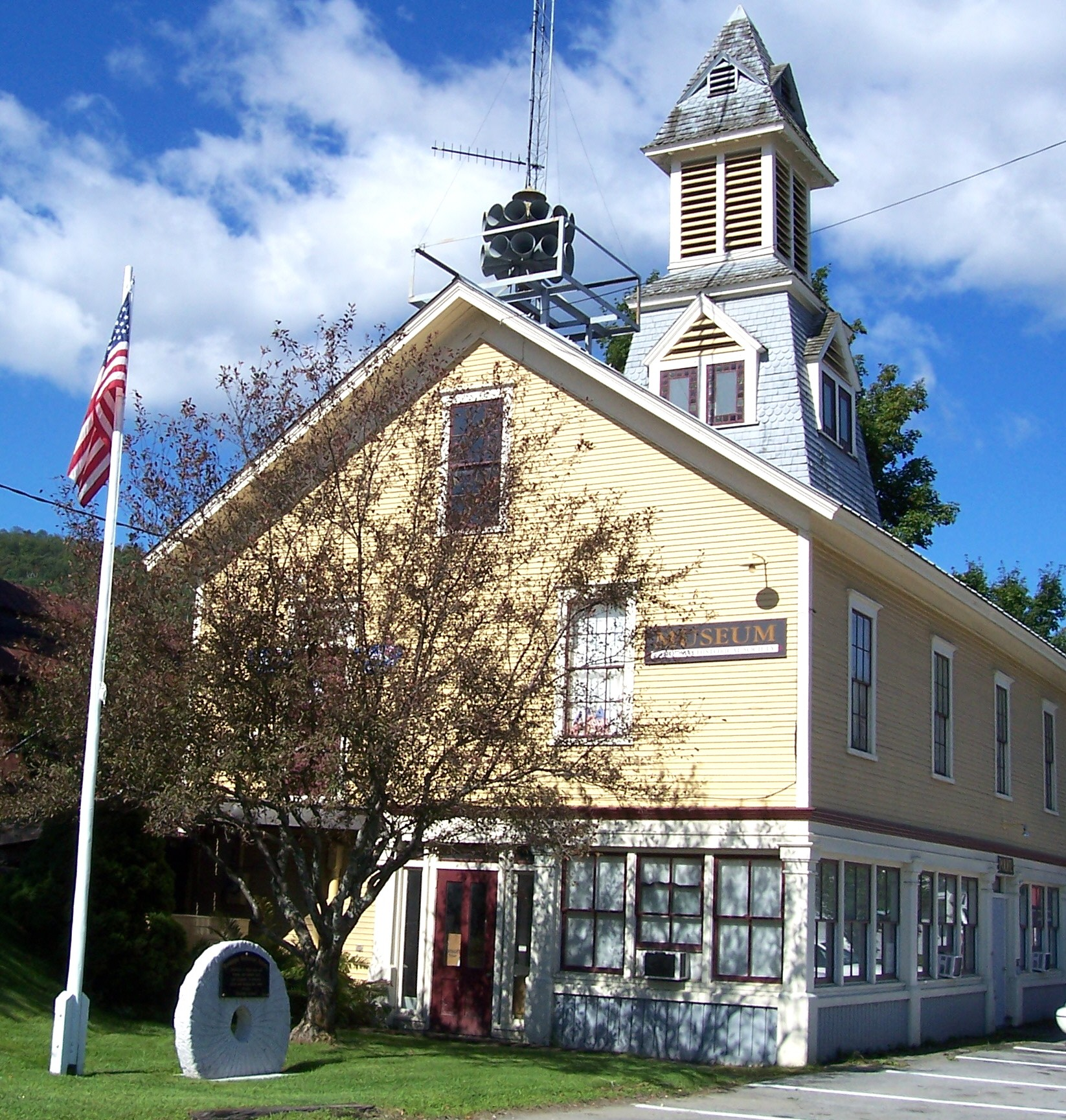
Randolph Historical Society Museum

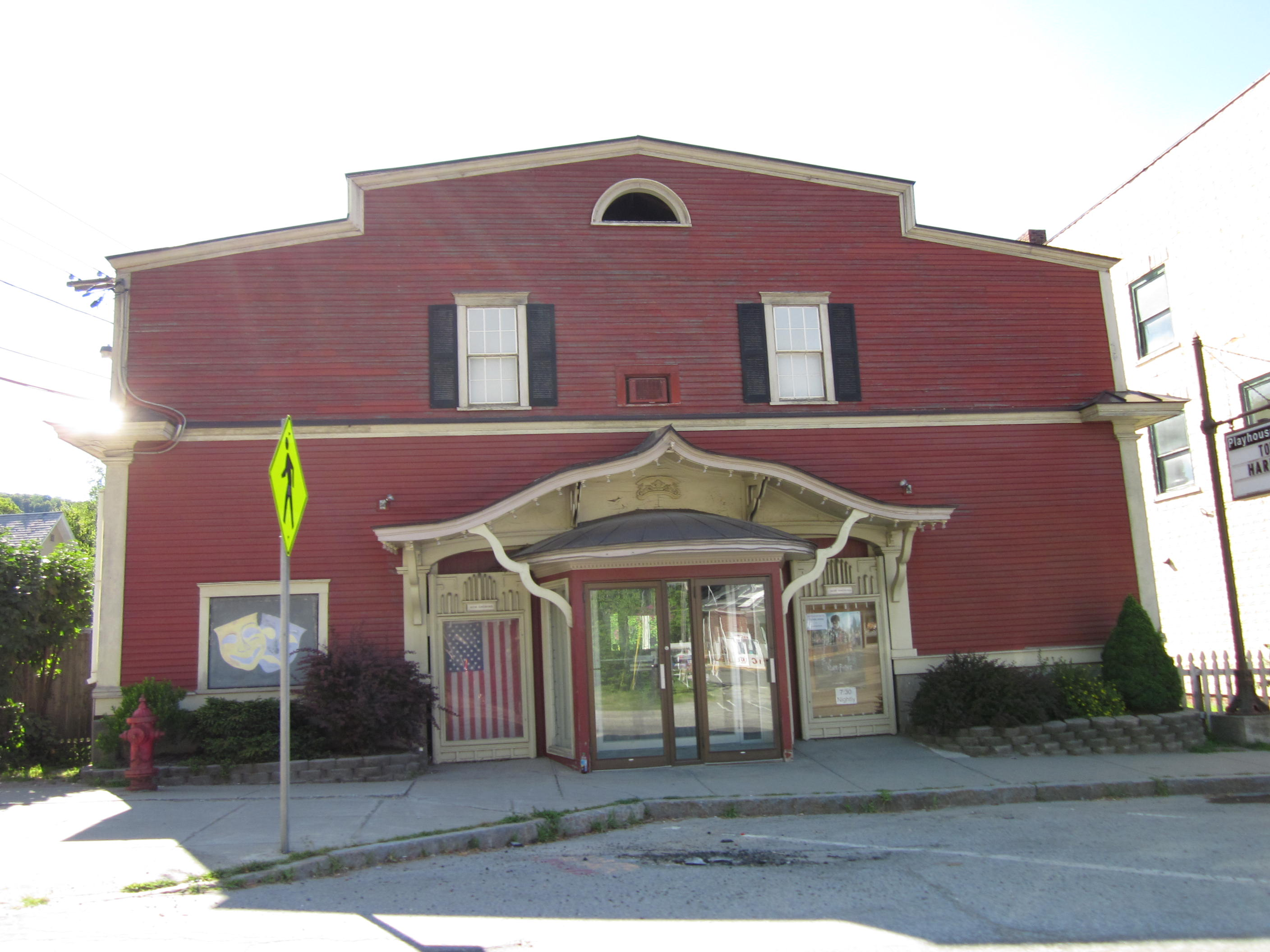
Playhouse movie theater

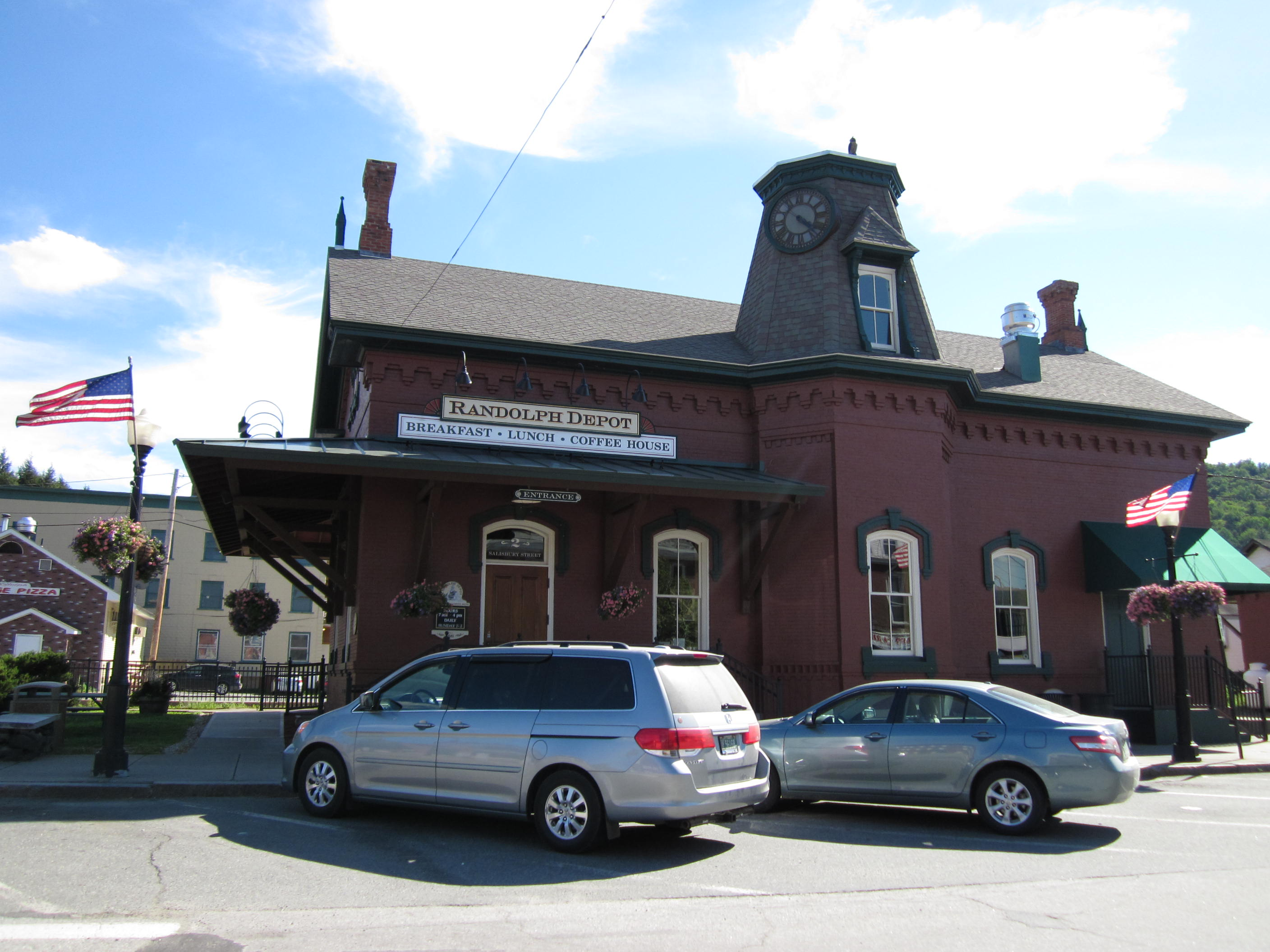
Depot building

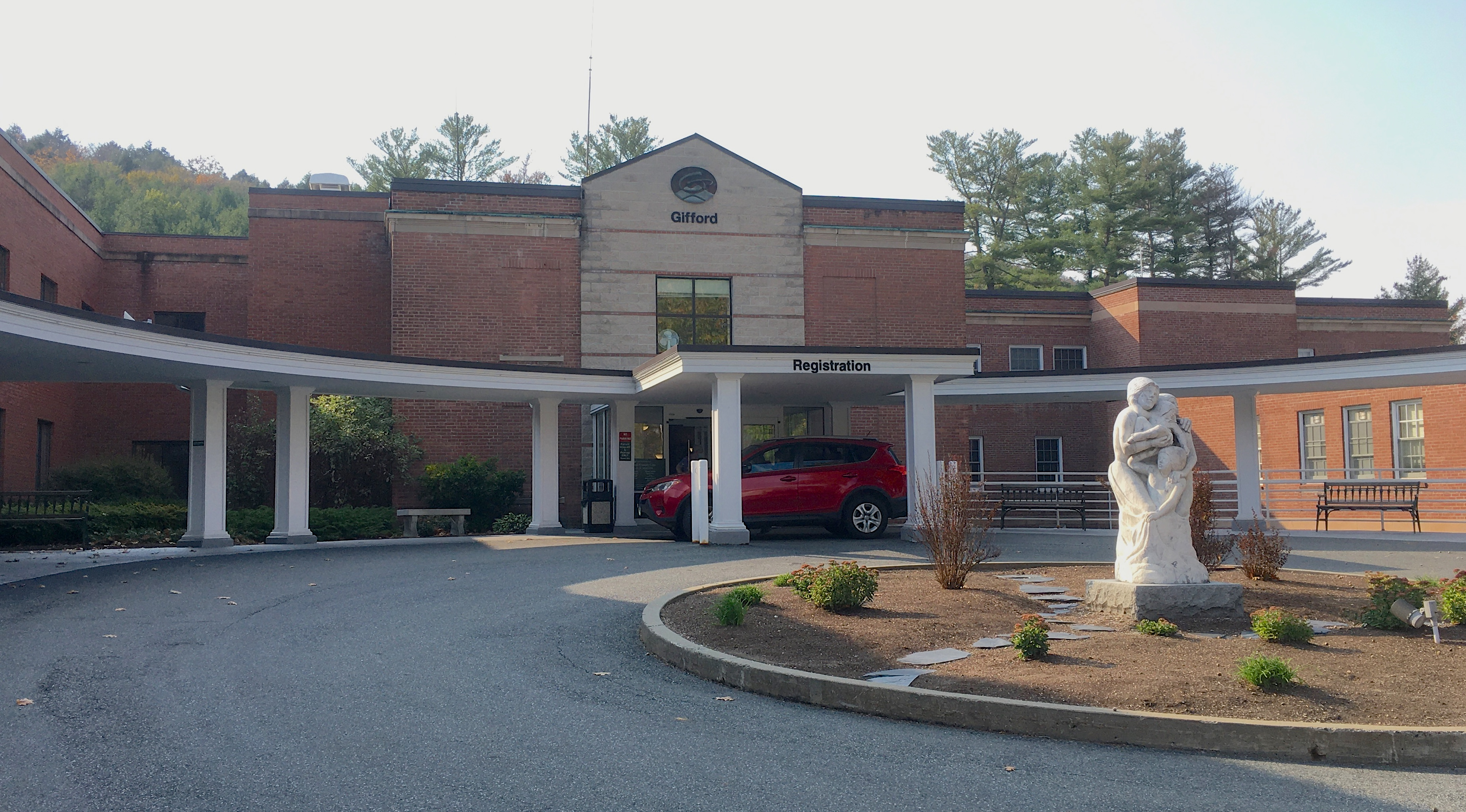
Gifford Medial Center

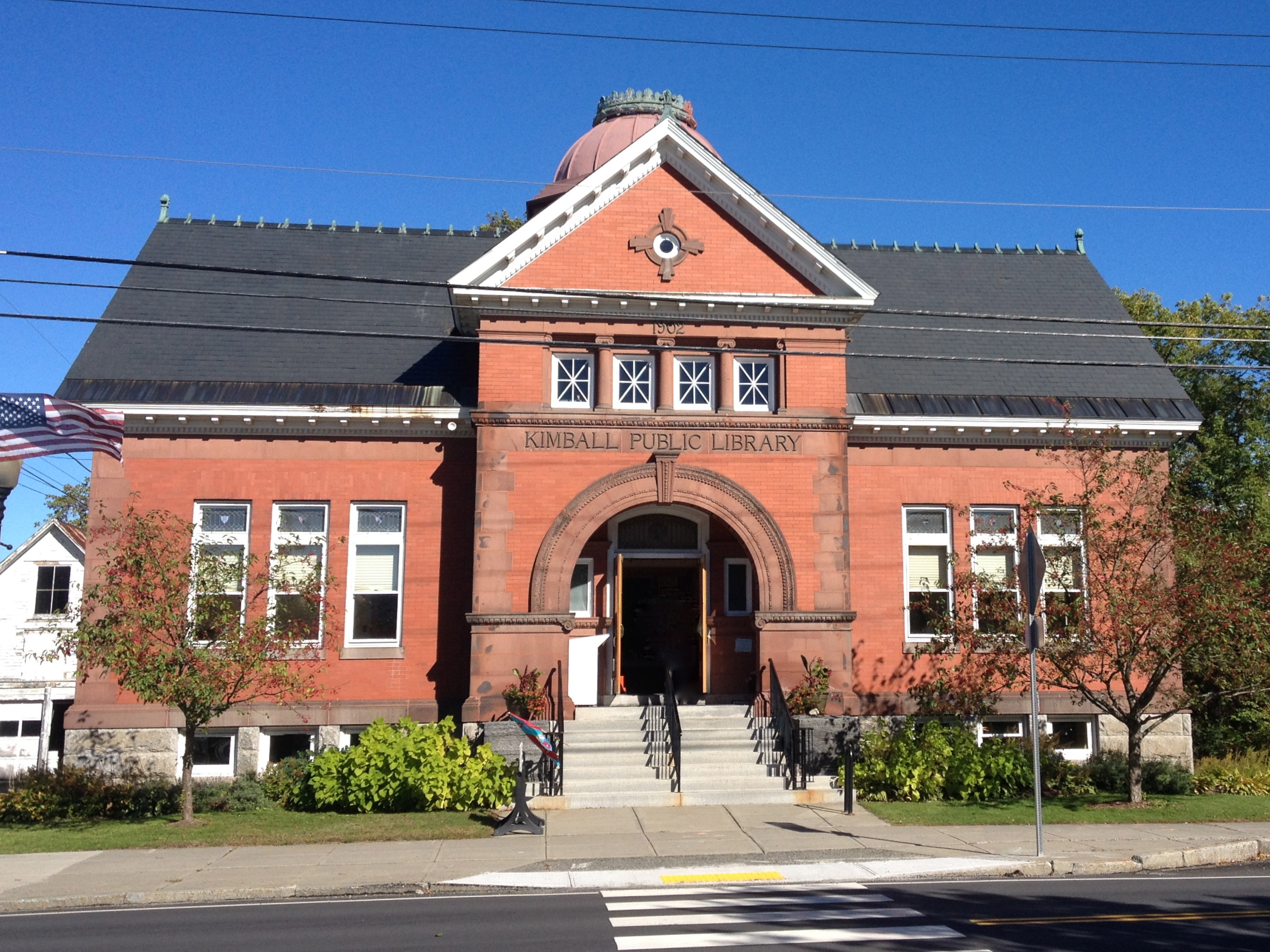
Kimball Public Library

== Notable people ==
- George W. Barker, U.S. Marshal for Vermont, Judge of Maniwitoc County, Wisconsin
- Jedediah Berry, author
- Dudley Blodget, Wisconsin politician
- Calvin H. Blodgett, mayor of Burlington, Vermont
- Nathaniel L. Carpenter, businessman
- Albert Brown Chandler, president of the Postal Telegraph Company
- Dudley Chase, United States Senator
- Harry H. Cooley, Secretary of State of Vermont
- William H. Dubois, Vermont State Treasurer
- Calvin Edson, soldier and sideshow performer
- Joseph Edson, U.S. Marshal for Vermont
- Lebbeus Egerton, Lieutenant Governor of Vermont
- Martin Flint, Anti-Masonic Party leader who served as Adjutant General of the Vermont Militia
- Henrik Galeen, actor, director
- Phil Godenschwager, artist
- William Hebard, US congressman
- Carroll Ketchum, Vermont state legislator
- Emily Levan, distance runner
- Zosia Mamet, singer, actress
- Jean Merrill, writer and editor
- Fraser Metzger, clergyman, politician, and college administrator, resided in Randolph
- Colonel Jonathan Miller, Freedom fighter, abolitionist and women's rights
- Justin Morgan, horse breeder and composer
- Sherman R. Moulton, Chief Justice of the Vermont Supreme Court
- Buster Olney, columnist for ESPN The Magazine
- John K. Parish, Wisconsin state legislator and jurist
- Jack Rowell (photographer), photographer
- John W. Rowell, Chief Justice of the Vermont Supreme Court
- John C. Sherburne, Vermont's first Rhodes Scholar and Chief Justice of the Vermont Supreme Court
- Milan H. Sessions, politician
- Ronni Solbert, children’s book illustrator
- Luther Tucker Sparhawk, photographer
- Larry Townsend, Vermont legislator
- Levi Baker Vilas, Vermont and Wisconsin politician
- Stephen W. Webster, Vermont state legislator who served as President pro tempore of the Vermont Senate
- Jessamyn West, librarian

== International relations ==
Randolph is twinned with:

- (Ukraine) Myrhorod

== See also ==
- List of municipalities in Vermont
