= Luther Tucker Sparhawk =

American photographer (1831–1918)

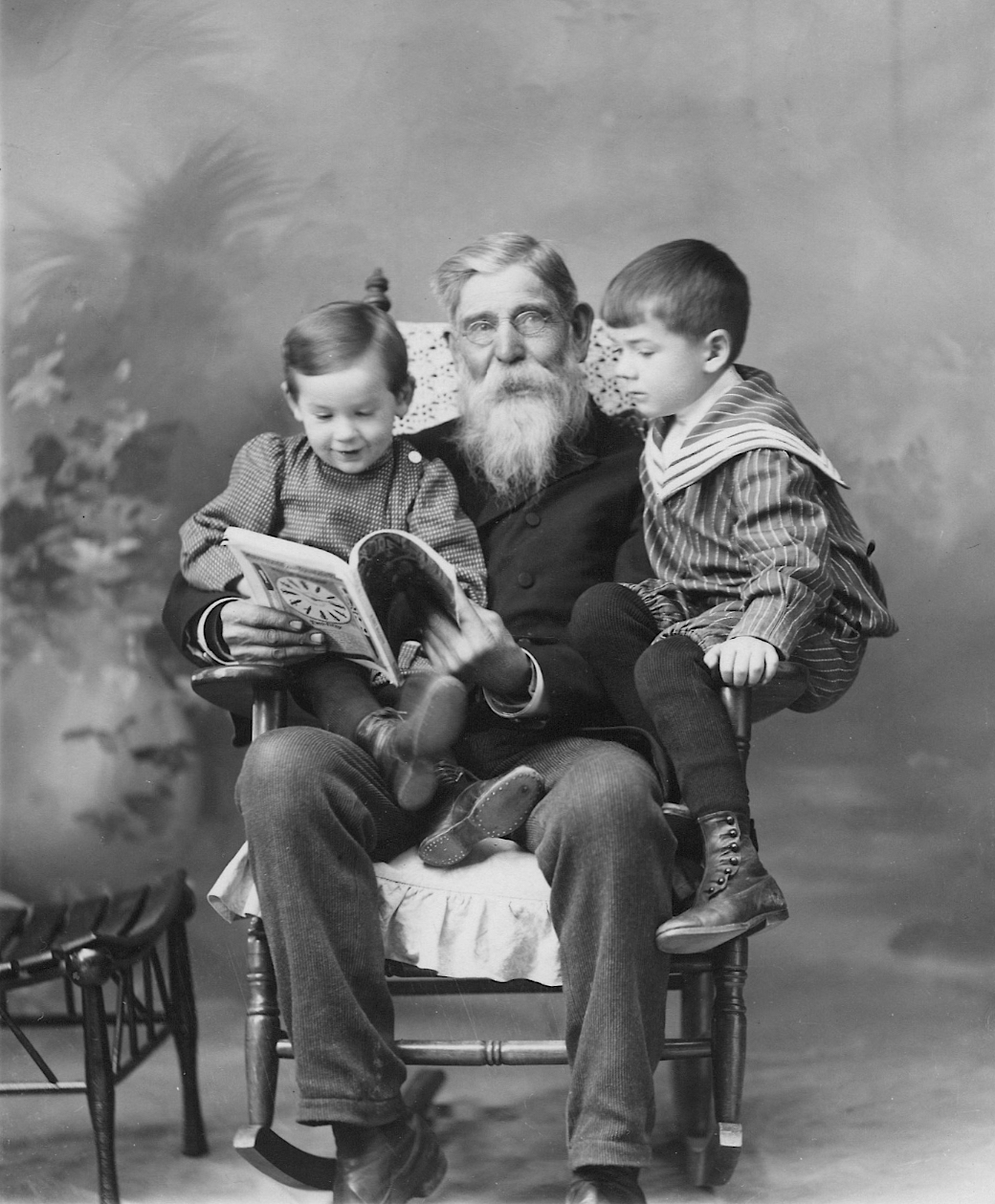
- Sparhawk with his grandsons
- Born: February 11, 1831; Rochester, Vermont
- Died: March 4, 1918 (aged 87); Randolph, Vermont
- Resting place: South View Cemetery. Randolph, Vermont
- Other name: L.T. Sparhawk
- Known for: Photography

Luther Tucker "L.T." Sparhawk (February 11, 1831 – March 4, 1918) was an early American photographer from Randolph, Vermont.

== Early life ==
Sparhawk was born in Rochester, Vermont, the son of Samuel Sparhawk and Laura (Fitts) Sparhawk, one of eight children. He moved to Randolph, Vermont in 1842 and spent the rest of his life there. His early profession was as a maker and tuner of melodeon reeds and he would often assemble other things for friends and family including fishing rods and children's toys. He also worked as a coal merchant and made maple molasses.

== Career ==
Sparhawk entered photography by learning to make ambrotypes from R. M. Macintosh in Northfield, Vermont and set up his own studio in Randolph, Sparhawk Studios. While he worked in photography for the rest of his life, the studio itself was located in six different downtown locations and sometimes co-located with a photography retail store and a hair salon.

He was a progressive photographer, often trying new styles, and there are extant images from him in ambrotype, tintype, glass negative and daguerreotype formats. He was said to be one of the first New Englanders to use the "dry plate" method of photography, and retouch negatives. He was listed in national registries of photography supply dealers as one of the few Vermonters in such a trade. He designed many of his own mechanisms including his own shutters for high speed photography and assisted other novice photographers with their mechanical photographic issues.

Sparhawk was an early popularizer of dry-plate photography in the region. His studio would give away dry plate cameras as a loss leader on the condition that people agreed to buy their glass plates from the studio. The studio also sold photographic frames. He also published the works of other photographers, including a noteworthy title Lands of Alaska, photographs by Dr. H.H. McIntire containing stereoscopic images of the Pribilof Islands in the 1870s through 1880s highlighting or alluding to the poor treatment of the Aleuts by the US government. Sparhawk considered stereoscopic images "the best kind of views ever made." His daughter Blanche assisted him in the studio until she was married.

Photographs from his studio are held by the Getty Museum, the Library of Congress, New York Public Library, and the Beinecke Library.

== Personal life ==
He married Josephine Bean on October 31, 1860. They had seven children, three of whom lived to adulthood: George, Willis, and Blanche. His wife predeceased him, dying on November 24, 1915 . Sparhawk died of pneumonia on March 4, 1918.

== Example works ==
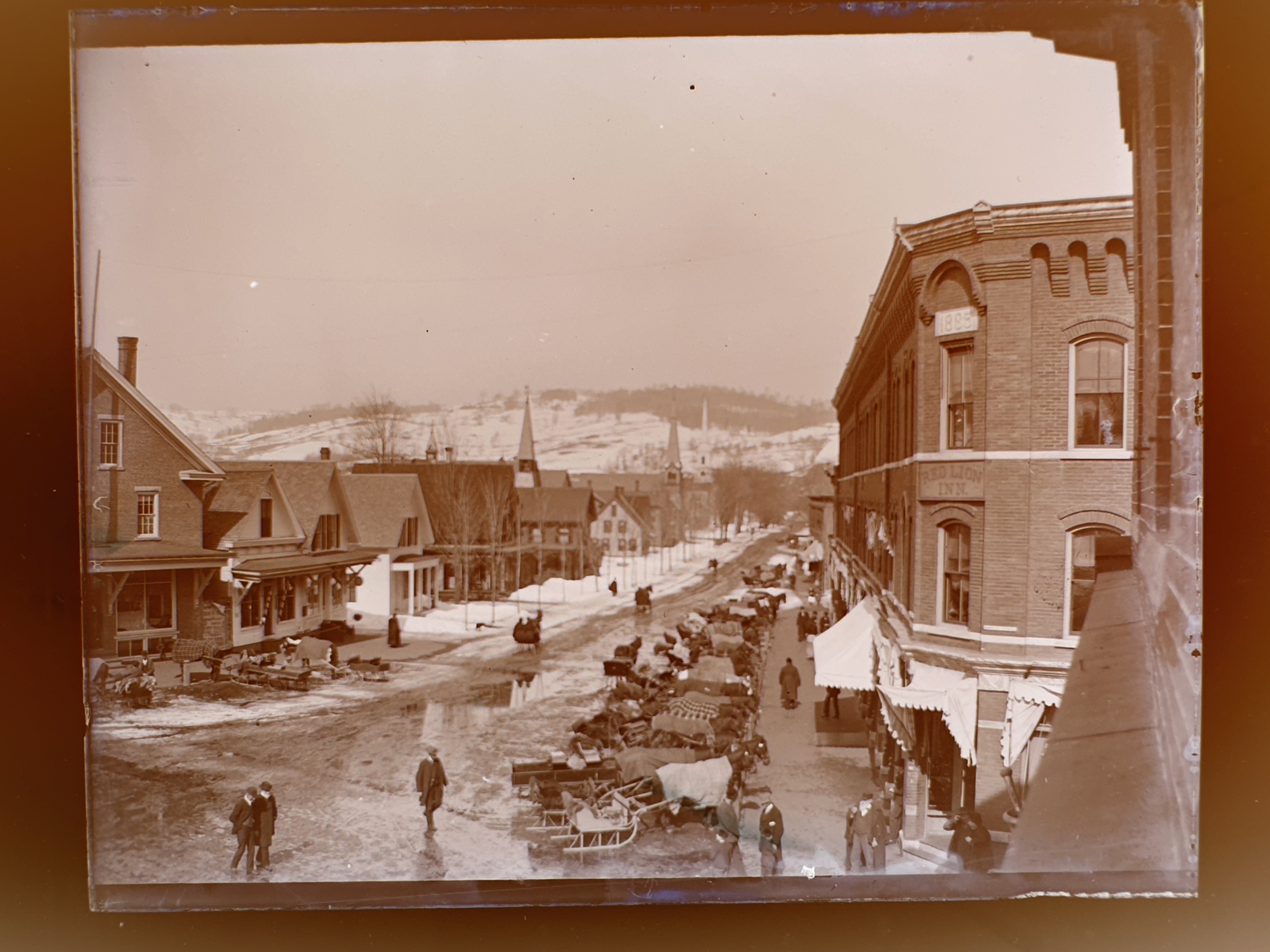
Main Street, Randolph Vermont

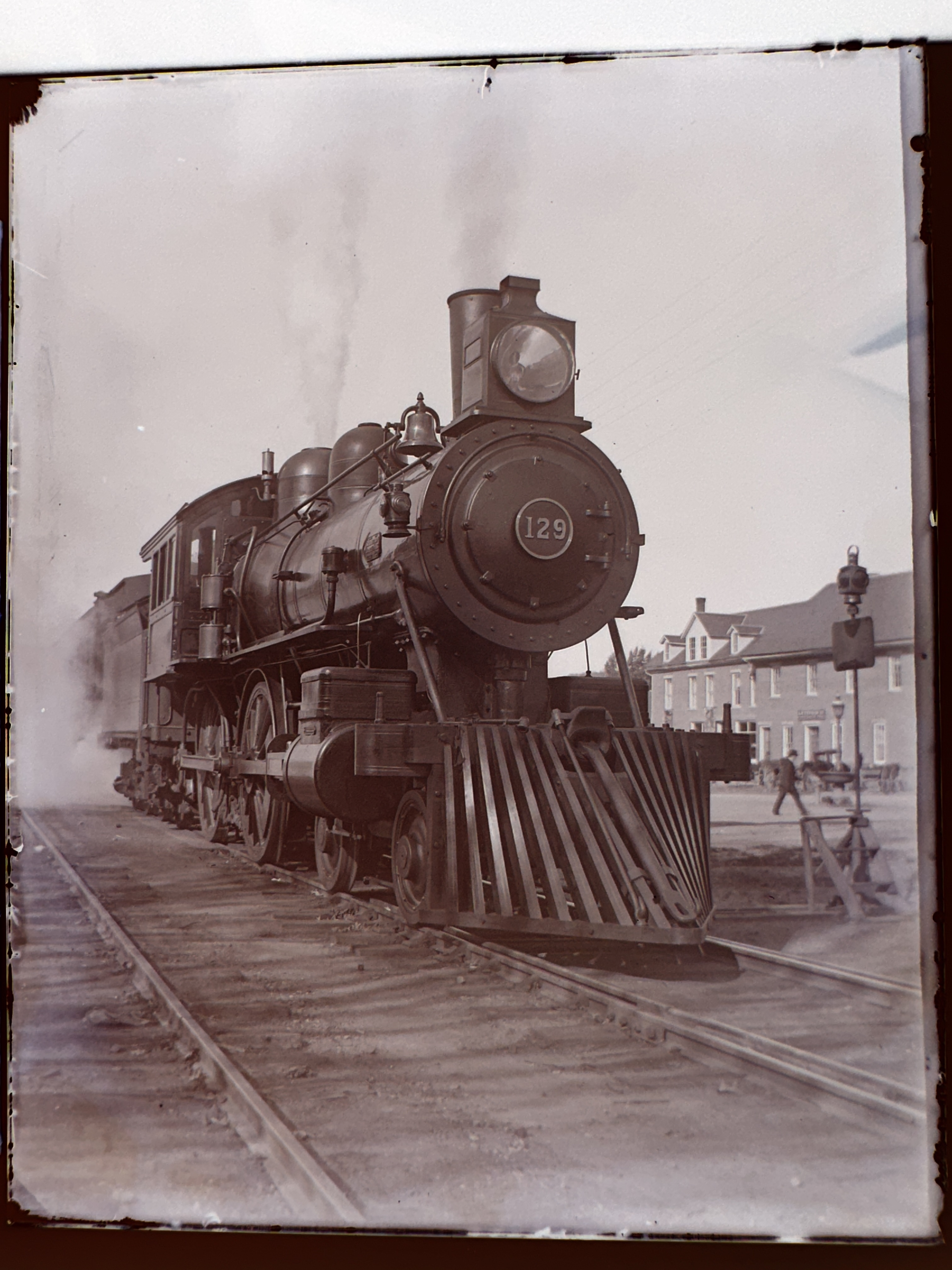
Locomotive 129

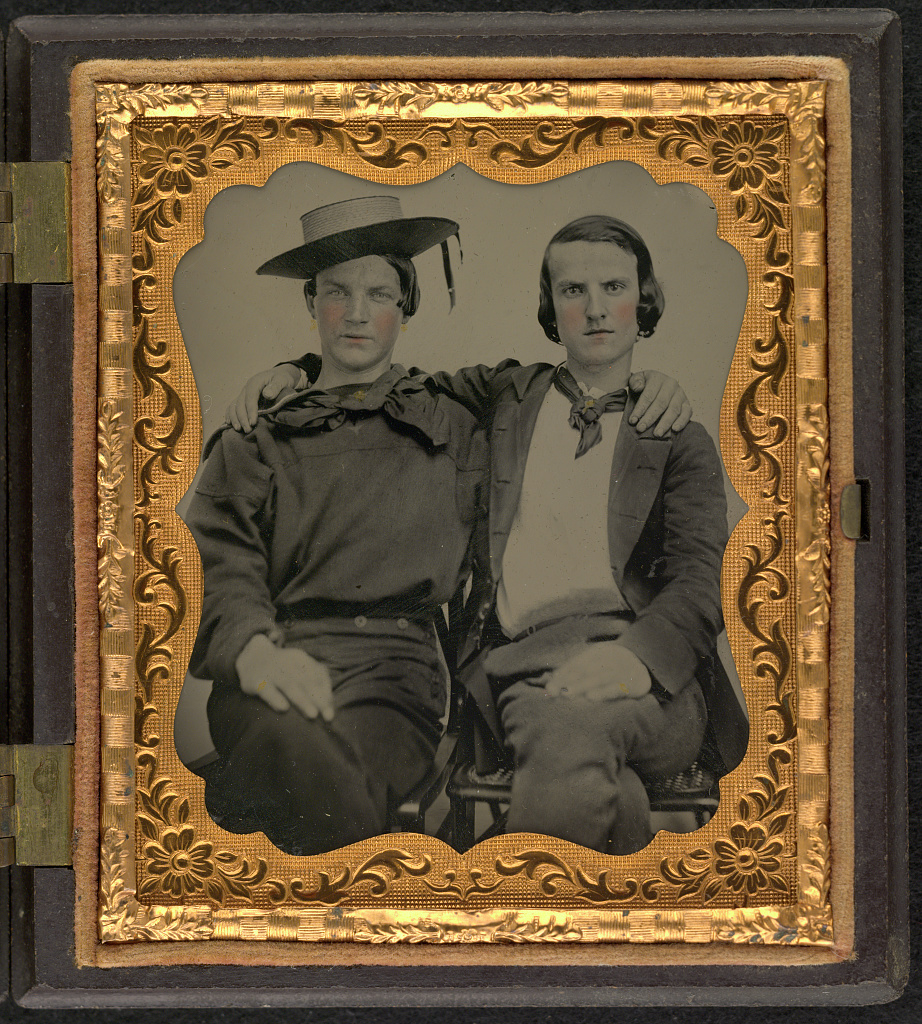
Unidentified sailor and civilian (from LOC)

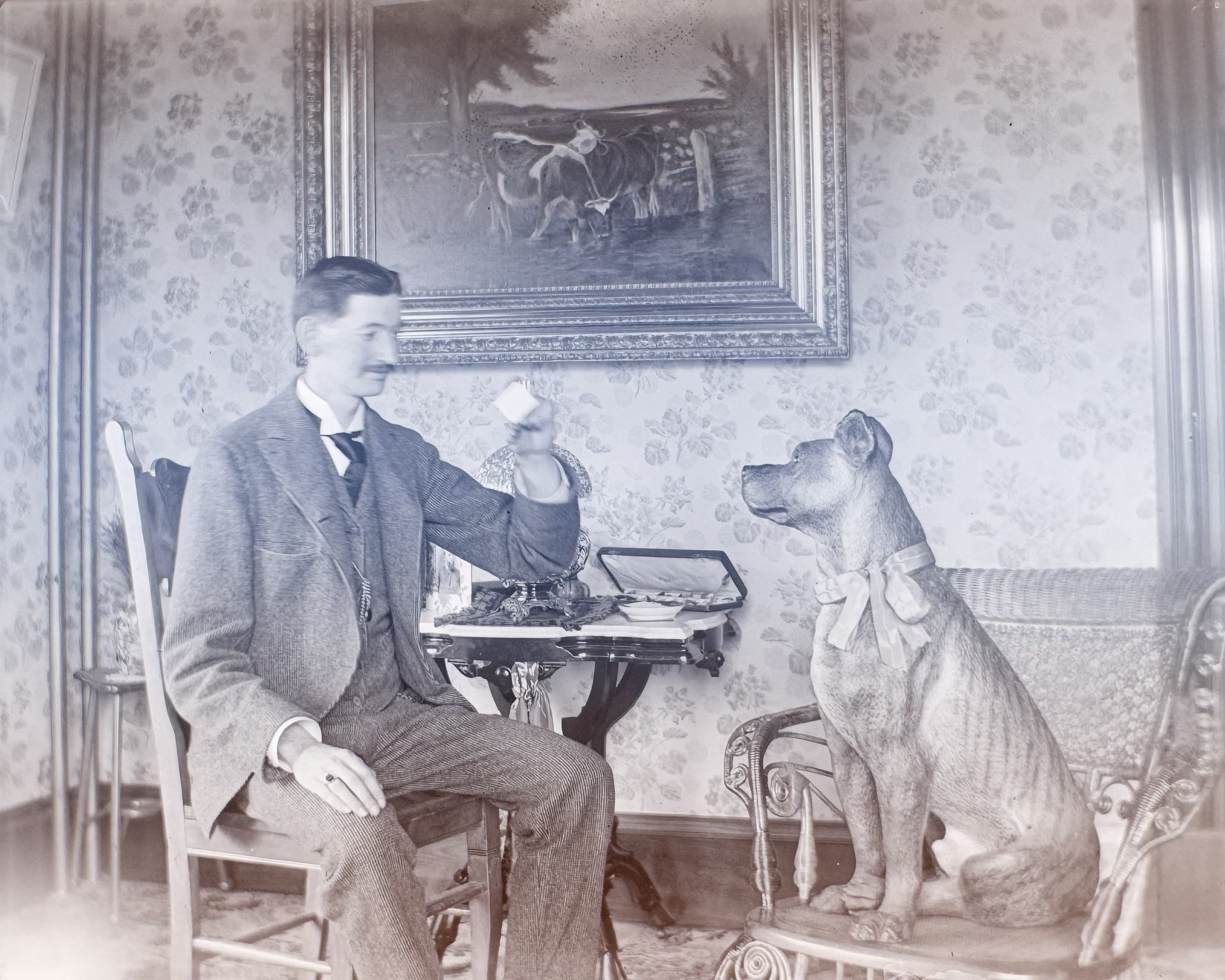
F. A. Walsh with dog

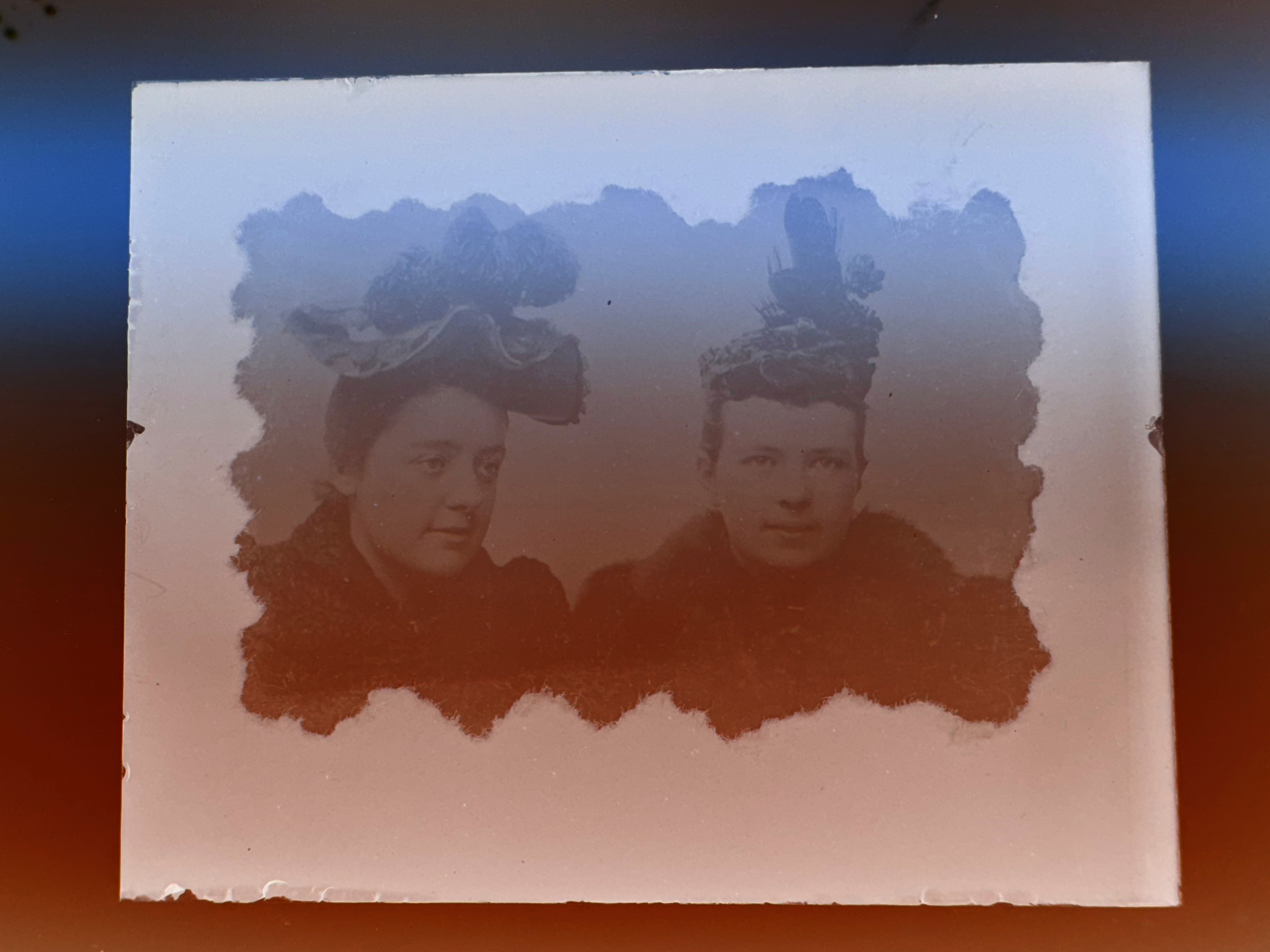
Clara and Daisy (enlarged from tintype)
