= Harrington House =

Harrington House may refer to:

in the United Kingdom

- Harrington House Care Home, Harrington Street, Bourne, Lincolnshire, PE10 9HA.
- 13 Kensington Palace Gardens, known as Harrington House. Former townhouse of the Earl of Harrington and currently the residence of the Russian ambassador in Londont
- Harrington House, Craig's Court, Whitehall, central London: built in 1702 for William Stanhope, 1st Earl of Harrington, now a Government building
- Harrington House, Bourton-on-the-Water, Gloucestershire

in the United States (by state then city)

- Harrington-Birchett House, Tempe, Arizona, listed on the National Register of Historic Places in Maricopa County, Arizona
- Connelly-Harrington House, Siloam Springs, Arkansas, listed on the NRHP in Benton County, Arkansas
- Holladay-Harrington House, Greenville, Delaware, listed on the NRHP in New Castle County, Delaware
- Harrington Meetinghouse, Pemaquid, Maine, NRHP-listed
- Harrington (Princess Anne, Maryland), NRHP-listed
- Theodore Harrington House, Southbridge, Massachusetts, NRHP-listed
- Harrington Block, Waltham, Massachusetts, NRHP-listed
- Samuel Harrington House, Waltham, Massachusetts, NRHP-listed
- Harrington House (Weston, Massachusetts), NRHP-listed
- Rose Harrington House, Stevensville, Montana, listed on the NRHP in Ravalli County, Montana
- Harrington-Smith Block, Manchester, New Hampshire, listed on the NRHP in Hillsborough County, New Hampshire
- Harrington Cobblestone Farmhouse and Barn Complex, Hartland, New York, NRHP-listed
- Harrington-Dewar House, Holly Springs, North Carolina, listed on the NRHP in Harnett County, North Carolina
- Harrington House (Dayton, Oregon), listed on the NRHP in Yamhill County, Oregon
- Landergin-Harrington House, Amarillo, Texas, listed on the NRHP in Potter County, Texas
- Harrington House (Bethel, Vermont), listed on the NRHP in Windsor County, Vermont
- Harrington Bank Block and Opera House, Harrington, Washington, listed on the NRHP in Lincoln County, Washington
