= Harrington House (Bethel, Vermont) =

Historic house in Vermont, United States

- U.S. National Register of Historic Places
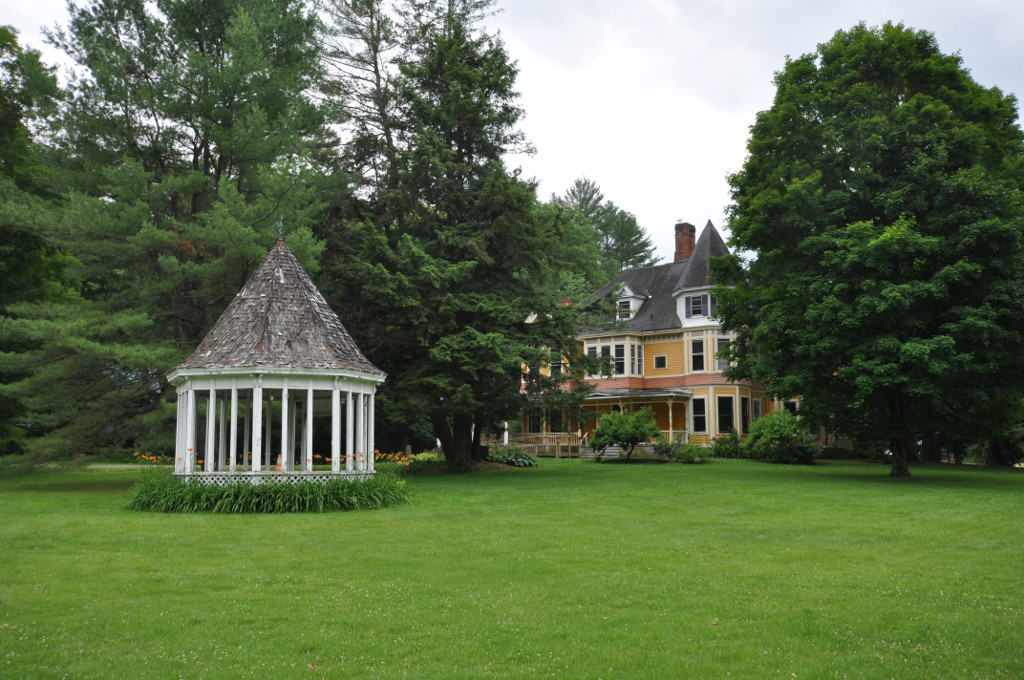

- Location within Vermont
- Location: North Rd. and VT 107, Bethel, Vermont
- Coordinates: 43°49′17″N 72°37′56″W
- Area: 4.9 acres (2.0 ha)
- Built: 1890
- Built by: Maxham, Olin, Henry
- Architectural style: Queen Anne
- NRHP reference No.: 83003230
- Added to NRHP: March 16, 1983

The Harrington House is a historic house at 88 North Road in Bethel, Vermont. Built in 1890–91, it is a fine example of high-style Queen Anne Victorian architecture, a relative rarity in the state. The house was listed on the National Register of Historic Places in 1983. Its most recent additions have included a restaurant, bed and breakfast inn.

== Description and history ==
The Harrington House stands in a rural-residential area south of Bethel village, at the triangular junction of Vermont Route 107 and North Road. It is a rambling 2 1/2-story wood-frame structure, with the irregular and asymmetric massing typical of the Queen Anne period. Its most prominent exterior features are a three-story polygonal turret that projects from one corner, and its porches and port-cochere, which feature delicate turned woodwork. The exterior is clad partly in wooden clapboards and partly in wooden shingles, and has a variety of projecting bays and dormers in its roof. The interior also features high-quality period woodwork, including an especially elaborate main staircase, as well as eight fireplaces featuring polychrome tiles.

The house was built in 1889 for Edwin and Mary Harrington, both originally from Stockbridge. Harrington was a successful businessman who had had a successful career in Philadelphia. This house was built by a local contractor; its architect is not known. Edwin Harrington died in 1891; his wife expanded the number of buildings on the grounds, adding the carriage house and gazebo. After the Harrington ownership ended in 1910, the house was adaptively reused for commercial purposes, first as a medical sanitorium, and then as a bed and breakfast inn. It has most recently housed a restaurant.

== See also ==
- National Register of Historic Places listings in Windsor County, Vermont
