= Locust Creek House Complex =

Historic house in Vermont, United States

- U.S. National Register of Historic Places
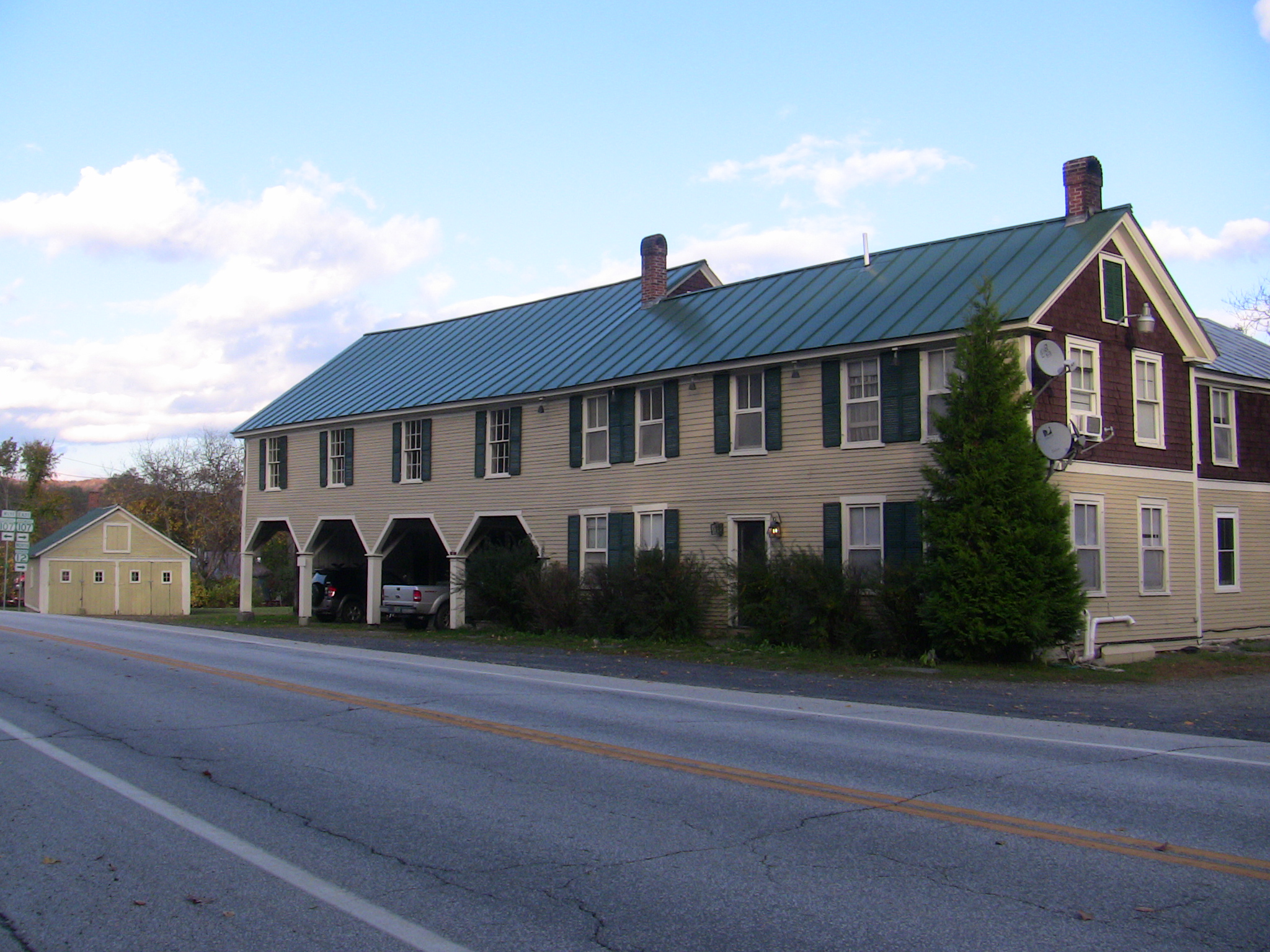

- Location within Vermont Location within the United States
- Location: VT 12, Bethel, Vermont
- Coordinates: 43°48′32″N 72°39′4″W
- Area: 1.3 acres (0.53 ha)
- Built: 1837
- Built by: Putnam, Daniel
- NRHP reference No.: 82001766
- Added to NRHP: December 10, 1982

The Locust Creek House Complex is a historic former tavern turned farmstead at 4 Creek Road (Vermont Route 12) in Bethel, Vermont. Built in 1837 and enlarged in 1860, it is a rare surviving example of a rural tavern in the state, with an added complex of agriculture-related outbuildings following its transition to a new role. The property was listed on the National Register of Historic Places in 1982. It now houses residences.

== Description and history ==
The Locust Creek House Complex stands on the east side of Vermont Route 12, just south of its junction with Vermont Route 107. It is a rambling complex of wood-frame structures, one or two stories in height, with most of them connected together. Stretching along the road are a five-bay I-house and a four-bay carriage barn with open ground-floor bays. Projecting from the rear of the I-house is a 1 1/2-story ell, while a barn is joined to the northeast corner of the carriage barn, and a gabled shed extends further north from the side of the barn. The southern sections of this structure have been covered in a modern metal roof, and adapted for residential use, with the open carriage barn bays used as vehicle parking.

The house is the oldest portion of the building, and was constructed as a tavern in 1837. It was apparently not very successful financially, going through a number of lessee and ownership changes in its early years. The carriage barn was added in 1860, also including a large ballroom with a sprung floor on the second floor. Then billed as a hotel, it became a favored local social venue for dances and other events. Because the railroad did not pass nearby, it eventually declined and closed permanently in 1899. For the first half of the 20th century it was the centerpiece of a small dairy farm.

== See also ==
- National Register of Historic Places listings in Windsor County, Vermont
