= Bethel Village Historic District =

Historic district in Vermont, United States

- U.S. National Register of Historic Places
- U.S. Historic district
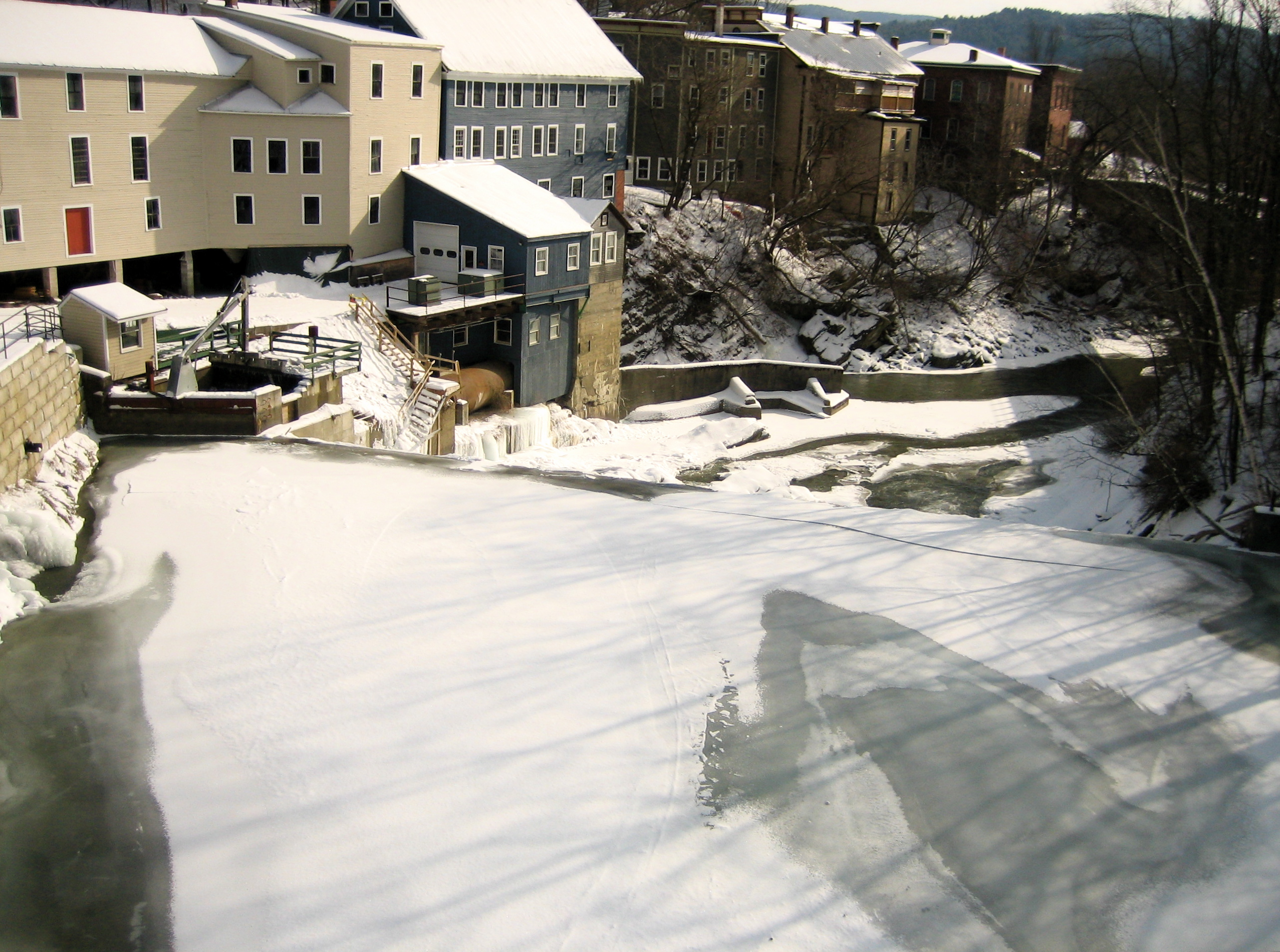
- View of White River, with Main Street buildings on the left, January 2007

- Location within Vermont Location within the United States
- Location: Both sides of S. Main, Main, N. Main, and Church Sts.; also River Rd. to the White River, Bethel, Vermont
- Coordinates: 43°49′51″N 72°38′2″W
- Area: 55 acres (22 ha) (original); 2.5 acres (1.0 ha) (size of 1990 increase)
- Built: 1779
- Architectural style: Greek Revival, Federal, Italianate Revival
- NRHP reference No.: 76000199 (original); 90000797 (increase)

Significant dates
- Added to NRHP: September 3, 1976
- Boundary increase: May 24, 1990

The Bethel Village Historic District encompasses the historic core of the village of Bethel in the town of Bethel, Vermont, USA. The L-shaped district extends along Main and Church Streets, including many of the village's commercial and civic buildings, as well as a significant number of 19th and early 20th-century residences. The district was listed on the National Register of Historic Places in 1976, and was slightly enlarged in 1990.

== Description and history ==
The small town of Bethel is located roughly midway between White River Junction and Montpelier in the White River valley of central southern Vermont. Its main village is located near the confluence of the Third Branch White River with its main branch, and has historically been focused on the water power provided by a set of falls on the Third Branch. The town was chartered in 1779, and a sawmill and gristmill were built at the falls soon afterward. The community soon grew as a small industrial center, and as a stop on the stage road that ran along the river (now roughly Vermont Routes 12 and 107 in this area). It was further enhanced in importance by the arrival of the railroad in 1849. A major fire destroyed a portion of its downtown in 1877, resulting in the construction of new, more fire-resistant buildings. In the late 19th century, the village benefited from the nearby granite extraction industry, which supplied stone for some major buildings in the eastern United States. The village declined during the Great Depression, with fires again destroying portions of the downtown in 1938 and 1945.

The historic district extends along Main and Church Streets (both marked VT 12) in an L-shaped configuration extending from River Street (where VT 107 bends west across the river) to Pleasant Street (where VT 12 continues north). The district extends for short distances along North Main Street (beyond the Church/Main intersection) and along River Street, where it extends to the bridge carrying that road across the White River. The Main Street portion of the district is characterized by commercial buildings, with a focused cluster of 19th-century two and three-story commercial buildings shortly before the Church Street intersection. Municipal buildings are found on the east side of Main Street near that junction, and several churches line Church Street across the river along with a number of residences. The district is architecturally diverse, reflecting styles from the early 19th century to the early 20th century.

== See also ==
- National Register of Historic Places listings in Windsor County, Vermont
