= Justice Leonard =

Justice Leonard may refer to:

- John E. Leonard (1845–1878), associate justice of the Louisiana Supreme Court
- Orville R. Leonard (1834–1894), associate justice of the Supreme Court of Nevada
