= Justice Garber =

Justice Garber may refer to:

- John Garber (judge) (died 1908), associate justice of the Supreme Court of Nevada
- Milton C. Garber (1867–1948), associate justice of the Supreme Court of the Territory of Oklahoma
