= 1904 United States presidential election in California =

- November 8, 1904
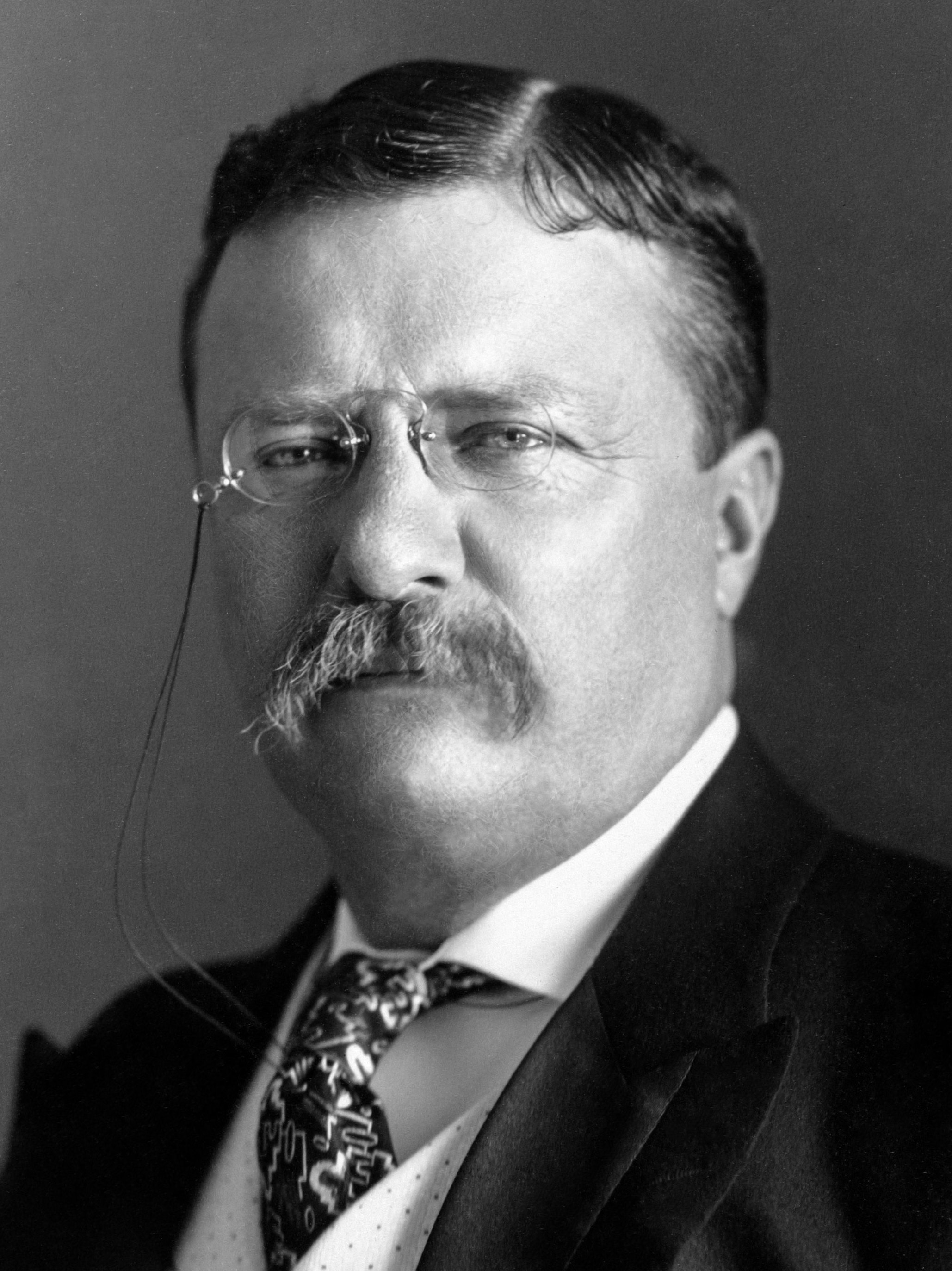

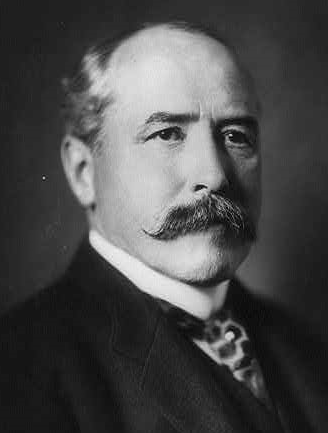

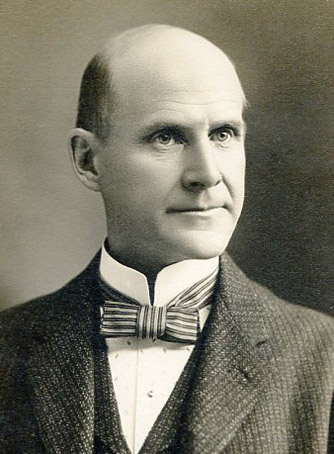
Nominee	Theodore Roosevelt	Alton B. Parker	Eugene V. Debs
Party	Republican	Democratic	Socialist
Home state	New York	New York	Indiana
Running mate	Charles W. Fairbanks	Henry G. Davis	Ben Hanford
Electoral vote	10	0	0
Popular vote	205,226	89,404	29,535
Percentage	61.84%	26.94%	8.90%
County results
Roosevelt
40–50%
50–60%
60–70%
70–80%
80–90%
Parker
40–50%
President before election
Theodore Roosevelt
Republican
Elected President
Theodore Roosevelt
Republican

The 1904 United States presidential election in California took place on November 8, 1904, as part of the 1904 United States presidential election. State voters chose 10 representatives, or electors, to the Electoral College, who voted for president and vice president.

California voted for the Republican incumbent, Theodore Roosevelt and his running mate Charles W. Fairbanks of Indiana. They defeated the Democratic nominees, former Chief Judge of New York Court of Appeals Alton B. Parker and his running mate, former US Senator Henry G. Davis of West Virginia. Roosevelt won the state by a wide margin of 34.9%. This was the first election in which a Republican carried Fresno County, Glenn County, Kern County, Lake County, Merced County, Modoc County, San Benito County, Stanislaus County, and Tulare County. Additionally, this was first time since 1872 that a Republican carried El Dorado County and Yolo County.

== Results ==
General Election Results
Party	Pledged to	Elector	Votes
Republican Party	Theodore Roosevelt	William S. Wood	205,226
Republican Party	Theodore Roosevelt	Ulysses S. Grant Jr.	204,856
Republican Party	Theodore Roosevelt	Edward Sweeney	204,578
Republican Party	Theodore Roosevelt	Charles M. Hammond	204,552
Republican Party	Theodore Roosevelt	Francis M. Smith	204,425
Republican Party	Theodore Roosevelt	Morris B. Harris	204,250
Republican Party	Theodore Roosevelt	Charles J. Walker	204,210
Republican Party	Theodore Roosevelt	William J. Dingee	204,158
Republican Party	Theodore Roosevelt	George H. Pippy	204,157
Republican Party	Theodore Roosevelt	Richard Melrose	203,779
Democratic Party	Alton B. Parker	James G. Maguire	89,404
Democratic Party	Alton B. Parker	John Garber	89,294
Democratic Party	Alton B. Parker	Edward White	89,284
Democratic Party	Alton B. Parker	Frank J. Sullivan	89,235
Democratic Party	Alton B. Parker	J. Ross Clark	89,223
Democratic Party	Alton B. Parker	Thomas Blair	89,138
Democratic Party	Alton B. Parker	A. F. Jones	89,118
Democratic Party	Alton B. Parker	Eugene Germain	88,980
Democratic Party	Alton B. Parker	J. W. Barneberg	88,870
Democratic Party	Alton B. Parker	W. M. S. Beebe	88,818
Socialist Party	Eugene V. Debs	Joseph Lawrence	29,535
Socialist Party	Eugene V. Debs	J. G. Hurst	29,424
Socialist Party	Eugene V. Debs	H. C. Tuck	29,414
Socialist Party	Eugene V. Debs	L. E. Leonard	29,389
Socialist Party	Eugene V. Debs	Thomas Booth	29,383
Socialist Party	Eugene V. Debs	Oswald Seifert	29,370
Socialist Party	Eugene V. Debs	Carl Bracher	29,366
Socialist Party	Eugene V. Debs	G. S. Brower	29,323
Socialist Party	Eugene V. Debs	W. A. Corey	29,312
Socialist Party	Eugene V. Debs	G. W. Woodbey	29,174
Prohibition Party	Silas C. Swallow	Charles T. Clark	7,380
Prohibition Party	Silas C. Swallow	Adams C. Bane	7,369
Prohibition Party	Silas C. Swallow	Adams C. Bane	7,353
Prohibition Party	Silas C. Swallow	Joseph E. McComas	7,347
Prohibition Party	Silas C. Swallow	John A. B. Wilson	7,347
Prohibition Party	Silas C. Swallow	William O. Clark	7,343
Prohibition Party	Silas C. Swallow	Joel G. Wright	7,335
Prohibition Party	Silas C. Swallow	Albert H. Southwick	7,334
Prohibition Party	Silas C. Swallow	William T. Eddy	7,333
Prohibition Party	Silas C. Swallow	Joel H. Smith	7,329
Write-in		Scattering	333 (Note: Includes 2 for Thomas E. Watson, who was the Populist nominee for President) (Note: The Statement of Vote only gives these as statewide totals, but the county figures can be found in the original county returns at the State Archives)
Votes cast (Note: Based on totals for highest elector on each ticket)			331,878

=== Results by county ===
County	Theodore Roosevelt Republican		Alton B. Parker Democratic		Eugene V. Debs Socialist		Silas C. Swallow Prohibition		Scattering Write-in		Margin		Total votes cast (Note: Based on the highest elector on each ticket)
County	#	%	#	%	#	%	#	%	#	%	#	%	Total votes cast
Alameda	19,065	70.32%	4,399	16.23%	3,293	12.15%	353	1.30%	0	0.00%	14,666	54.10%	27,110
Alpine	74	89.16%	9	10.84%	0	0.00%	0	0.00%	0	0.00%	65	78.31%	83
Amador	1,279	54.45%	915	38.95%	128	5.45%	27	1.15%	0	0.00%	364	15.50%	2,349
Butte	2,799	58.84%	1,574	33.09%	273	5.74%	111	2.33%	0	0.00%	1,225	25.75%	4,757
Calaveras	1,571	58.75%	844	31.56%	244	9.12%	15	0.56%	0	0.00%	727	27.19%	2,674
Colusa	885	46.78%	900	47.57%	92	4.86%	15	0.79%	0	0.00%	-15	-0.79%	1,892
Contra Costa	2,833	62.54%	1,257	27.75%	391	8.63%	48	1.06%	1	0.02%	1,576	34.79%	4,530
Del Norte	429	60.17%	187	26.23%	83	11.64%	14	1.96%	0	0.00%	242	33.94%	713
El Dorado	1,248	54.10%	865	37.49%	174	7.54%	20	0.87%	0	0.00%	383	16.60%	2,307
Fresno	4,929	55.78%	2,815	31.86%	762	8.62%	330	3.73%	0	0.00%	2,114	23.92%	8,836
Glenn	765	50.03%	725	47.42%	24	1.57%	15	0.98%	0	0.00%	40	2.62%	1,529
Humboldt	4,930	72.46%	1,249	18.36%	457	6.72%	97	1.43%	71	1.04%	3,681	54.10%	6,804
Inyo	452	55.73%	231	28.48%	84	10.36%	44	5.43%	0	0.00%	221	27.25%	811
Kern	2,359	51.61%	1,724	37.72%	436	9.54%	52	1.14%	0	0.00%	635	13.89%	4,571
Kings	1,110	58.67%	595	31.45%	121	6.40%	66	3.49%	0	0.00%	515	27.22%	1,892
Lake	641	45.40%	594	42.07%	124	8.78%	53	3.75%	0	0.00%	47	3.33%	1,412
Lassen	573	62.69%	301	32.93%	35	3.83%	5	0.55%	0	0.00%	272	29.76%	914
Los Angeles	32,507	66.25%	10,030	20.44%	4,047	8.25%	2,299	4.69%	184	0.37%	22,477	45.81%	49,067
Madera	784	51.85%	610	40.34%	92	6.08%	26	1.72%	0	0.00%	174	11.51%	1,512
Marin	2,199	70.71%	772	24.82%	127	4.08%	12	0.39%	0	0.00%	1,427	45.88%	3,110
Mariposa	461	42.88%	486	45.21%	121	11.26%	7	0.65%	0	0.00%	-25	-2.33%	1,075
Mendocino	2,904	61.55%	1,489	31.56%	235	4.98%	90	1.91%	0	0.00%	1,415	29.99%	4,718
Merced	972	49.07%	863	43.56%	108	5.45%	38	1.92%	0	0.00%	109	5.50%	1,981
Modoc	559	53.91%	444	42.82%	18	1.74%	16	1.54%	0	0.00%	115	11.09%	1,037
Mono	245	64.64%	82	21.64%	47	12.40%	5	1.32%	0	0.00%	163	43.01%	379
Monterey	2,453	59.17%	1,415	34.13%	167	4.03%	111	2.68%	0	0.00%	1,038	25.04%	4,146
Napa	2,425	63.30%	1,135	29.63%	177	4.62%	94	2.45%	0	0.00%	1,290	33.67%	3,831
Nevada	2,249	58.72%	1,167	30.47%	340	8.88%	74	1.93%	0	0.00%	1,082	28.25%	3,830
Orange	2,665	59.54%	1,034	23.10%	501	11.19%	276	6.17%	0	0.00%	1,631	36.44%	4,476
Placer	2,050	62.60%	1,023	31.24%	153	4.67%	48	1.47%	1	0.03%	1,027	31.36%	3,275
Plumas	707	65.28%	347	32.04%	23	2.12%	6	0.55%	0	0.00%	360	33.24%	1,083
Riverside	2,638	65.23%	678	16.77%	534	13.20%	194	4.80%	0	0.00%	1,960	48.47%	4,044
Sacramento	6,666	65.16%	2,384	23.30%	1,060	10.36%	110	1.08%	10	0.10%	4,282	41.86%	10,230
San Benito	888	54.51%	645	39.59%	34	2.09%	62	3.81%	0	0.00%	243	14.92%	1,629
San Bernardino	3,884	58.23%	1,573	23.58%	796	11.93%	417	6.25%	0	0.00%	2,311	34.65%	6,670
San Diego	4,303	59.51%	1,398	19.33%	1,377	19.04%	152	2.10%	1	0.01%	2,905	40.17%	7,231
San Francisco	39,816	60.86%	18,027	27.55%	7,250	11.08%	334	0.51%	0	0.00%	21,789	33.30%	65,427
San Joaquin	4,498	61.65%	2,293	31.43%	387	5.30%	118	1.62%	0	0.00%	2,205	30.22%	7,296
San Luis Obispo	2,015	54.79%	1,167	31.73%	353	9.60%	132	3.59%	11	0.30%	848	23.06%	3,678
San Mateo	2,146	68.45%	851	27.15%	124	3.96%	14	0.45%	0	0.00%	1,295	41.31%	3,135
Santa Barbara	2,676	62.85%	1,152	27.05%	353	8.29%	77	1.81%	0	0.00%	1,524	35.79%	4,258
Santa Clara	8,274	66.10%	3,100	24.77%	743	5.94%	400	3.20%	0	0.00%	5,174	41.34%	12,517
Santa Cruz	2,626	60.66%	1,105	25.53%	407	9.40%	191	4.41%	0	0.00%	1,521	35.14%	4,329
Shasta	1,891	55.10%	935	27.24%	543	15.82%	63	1.84%	0	0.00%	956	27.86%	3,432
Sierra	791	65.05%	376	30.92%	45	3.70%	4	0.33%	0	0.00%	415	34.13%	1,216
Siskiyou	2,104	59.67%	1,219	34.57%	184	5.22%	19	0.54%	0	0.00%	885	25.10%	3,526
Solano	3,176	61.37%	1,555	30.05%	326	6.30%	118	2.28%	0	0.00%	1,621	31.32%	5,175
Sonoma	5,269	61.63%	2,816	32.94%	345	4.04%	118	1.38%	2	0.02%	2,453	28.69%	8,550
Stanislaus	1,437	52.39%	1,110	40.47%	101	3.68%	95	3.46%	0	0.00%	327	11.92%	2,743
Sutter	872	60.81%	488	34.03%	53	3.70%	21	1.46%	0	0.00%	384	26.78%	1,434
Tehama	1,234	56.32%	720	32.86%	191	8.72%	46	2.10%	0	0.00%	514	23.46%	2,191
Trinity	467	54.11%	308	35.69%	84	9.73%	4	0.46%	0	0.00%	159	18.42%	863
Tulare	2,221	48.54%	1,643	35.90%	574	12.54%	131	2.86%	7	0.15%	578	12.63%	4,576
Tuolumne	1,280	48.30%	1,006	37.96%	296	11.17%	43	1.62%	25	0.94%	274	10.34%	2,650
Ventura	1,995	63.86%	840	26.89%	227	7.27%	62	1.98%	0	0.00%	1,155	36.97%	3,124
Yolo	1,702	51.87%	1,301	39.65%	190	5.79%	88	2.68%	0	0.00%	401	12.22%	3,281
Yuba	1,235	62.72%	633	32.15%	81	4.11%	0	0.00%	20	1.02%	602	30.57%	1,969
Total	205,226	61.84%	89,404	26.94%	29,535	8.90%	7,380	2.22%	333	0.10%	115,822	34.90%	331,878

==== Counties that flipped from Democratic to Republican ====
- El Dorado
- Fresno
- Glenn
- Inyo
- Kern
- Lake
- Merced
- Modoc
- San Benito
- San Luis Obispo
- Shasta
- Stanislaus
- Tulare
- Tuolumne
- Yolo
