= Orville R. Leonard =

American judge (1834–1894)

Orville Rinaldo Leonard

Justice of the Supreme Court of Nevada
- In office 1877–1889
- Preceded by: Warner Earll
- Succeeded by: Michael A. Murphy

Personal details
- Born: November 13, 1834 Gaysville, Stockbridge, Vermont
- Died: September 22, 1894 (aged 59) Woodstock, Vermont
- Spouse(s): Eliza B. Sylvester (m. 1868; died); Grace Welles (m. 1894)
- Education: Attended Dartmouth College (1858–1860)
- Occupation: Lawyer, Judge

Orville Rinaldo Leonard (November 13, 1834 – September 22, 1894) was a justice of the Supreme Court of Nevada from 1877 to 1889.

== Early life, education, and career ==
Born in Gaysville, Stockbridge, Vermont, Leonard was the son of John and Lois Leonard, his father being a farmer. Leonard attended Dartmouth College from 1858 to 1860, though he did not graduate, leaving in his junior year. He then went to California, where he read law under Judge Isaac S. Belcher of San Francisco. gained admission to the bar in May 1863, and moved to Humboldt County, Nevada, where he engaged in the practice of law. He was elected District Attorney in 1863, and held the position until 1869. During that time, he was a delegate to the 1868 Republican National Convention in Chicago, which nominated Ulysses S. Grant for President.

== Judicial service and later life ==
In 1876, Leonard was elected to the Nevada Supreme Court. He was re-elected in 1882 for another term of six years more, serving for that period as chief justice. He published several volumes of the Nevada Supreme Court Reports. From 1890 to 1894, he lived in Ogden, Utah.

== Personal life ==
Leonard was a Republican, and in religion "believed in the over-ruling Providence, and that we cannot escape punishment for wrong-doing, but in no other sense did he believe in eternal punishment". He married Eliza B. Sylvester of West Newbury, Massachusetts in May 1868. They had no children.

On August 13, 1894, Leonard married Grace Welles of Elmira, New York. He died about six weeks later, following a severe headache, while the couple was on their honeymoon in Woodstock, Vermont. He was buried in the family cemetery at Stockbridge.

Political offices
Preceded by Warner Earll	Justice of the Supreme Court of Nevada; 1877–1889	Succeeded by Michael A. Murphy
