= Bethel Historic District =

Bethel Historic District may refer to:

- Bethel Historic District (Bethel, Delaware), listed on the NRHP in Delaware
- Bethel Historic District (Bethel, Missouri), listed on the NRHP in Missouri
- Bethel Village Historic District, Bethel, Vermont, listed on the NRHP in Vermont
