= Charles Henry Belknap =

American judge (1841–1926)

Justice of the Supreme Court of Nevada
- In office 1872–1875
- Preceded by: John Garber
- Succeeded by: Warner Earll

Justice of the Supreme Court of Nevada
- In office 1881–1904
- Preceded by: William H. Beatty
- Succeeded by: Frank H. Norcross

Personal details
- Born: 1841 New York
- Died: October 6, 1926 (aged 85) San Francisco, California
- Spouse: Virginia Bradley
- Children: 4
- Occupation: Lawyer, Judge

Charles Henry Belknap (1841 – October 6, 1926) was a justice of the Supreme Court of Nevada from 1872 to 1875, and from 1881 to 1904.

Born in New York, Belknap moved to Nevada where he served two terms as mayor of Virginia City, Nevada, and later became a lower court judge. In 1873, he was appointed to the state supreme court by Governor Lewis R. Bradley, but was defeated in a bid for reelection to the seat the following year. In 1880, he again ran for the seat and this time was elected, thereafter remained on the court until 1904.

In 1873, Belknap married Virginia Bradley, the daughter of Governor Bradley, with whom he had four children who survived him. Following Belknap's retirement from the court, he moved to San Francisco, California, where he remained until his death at the age of 85, two weeks after the death of his wife.

Political offices
Preceded by John Garber; William H. Beatty	Justice of the Supreme Court of Nevada; 1872–1875; 1881–1904	Succeeded by Warner Earll; Frank H. Norcross
