= Warner Earll =

American judge (1814–1888)

Justice of the Supreme Court of Nevada
- In office 1875–1877
- Preceded by: Charles Henry Belknap
- Succeeded by: Orville R. Leonard

Personal details
- Born: c. 1814
- Died: January 10, 1888 (aged 74); San Luis Obispo, California
- Children: Arthur Earll
- Occupation: Lawyer, Judge

Warner Earll (c. 1814 – January 10, 1888) was a justice of the Supreme Court of Nevada from 1875 to 1877.

In the general election of 1874, Earll was elected to fill out the balance of the unexpired term of John Garber, defeating incumbent C. H. Belknap, who had been temporarily appointed to the seat. Earll served but two years and was not a candidate to succeed himself.

At the election of 1876, O. R. Leonard was elected to succeed Earll and was re-elected in 1882, defeating M. Kirkpatrick and M. N. Stone, respectively.

Earll died at his home in San Luis Obispo, California, at the age of 73. A tribute to his memory, worth and ability was pronounced by Justice Thomas Porter Hawley and appears in the 19 Nevada Reports. Earll had a son, Arthur, who was also a lawyer, and who had practiced law in his father's firm for a time. Arthur died in 1889, shortly after being elected district attorney.

Political offices
| Preceded by Charles Henry Belknap | Justice of the Supreme Court of Nevada; 1875–1877 | Succeeded by Orville R. Leonard |
