= Gaysville, Vermont =

- Village
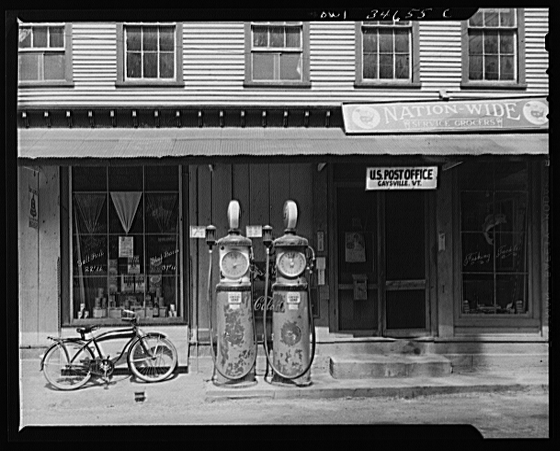
- Gaysville, Vermont, in 1943

- Location within Vermont
- Coordinates: 43°46′42″N 72°41′56″W
- Country: United States
- State: Vermont
- County: Windsor
- Elevation: 630 ft (190 m)
- Time zone: UTC-5 (Eastern (EST))
  - Summer (DST): UTC-4 (EDT)
- ZIP code: 05746
- Area code: 802
- GNIS feature ID: 1457531

Gaysville is an unincorporated village in the town of Stockbridge, Windsor County, Vermont, United States. The community is located along Vermont Route 107 and the White River, 18 miles (29 km) northeast of Rutland. Gaysville has a post office with ZIP code 05746.
