= Bethel (CDP), Vermont =

Census-designated place in Vermont, United States

Bethel, Vermont
- Census-designated place
- Location in Windsor County and the state of Vermont.
- Coordinates: 43°49′38″N 72°37′46″W
- Country: United States
- State: Vermont
- County: Windsor

Area
  - Total: 1.6 sq mi (4.2 km^{2})
  - Land: 1.6 sq mi (4.1 km^{2})
  - Water: 0.039 sq mi (0.1 km^{2})
- Elevation: 535 ft (163 m)

Population (2010)
  - Total: 569
  - Density: 360/sq mi (140/km^{2})
- Time zone: UTC-5 (Eastern (EST))
  - Summer (DST): UTC-4 (EDT)
- ZIP code: 05032
- Area code: 802
- FIPS code: 50-05725
- GNIS feature ID: 2586620

Bethel is a census-designated place (CDP) that comprises the central village of the town of Bethel, Windsor County, Vermont, United States. As of the 2010 census, the population of the CDP was 569, compared to 2,030 for the entire town of Bethel.

== Geography ==
Bethel is located along the Third Branch of the White River, at its confluence with the White River.

Vermont Routes 12 and 107 diverge at the village, with Route 12 heading north up the Third Branch valley towards Randolph and Route 107 heading southwest up the White River Valley towards Stockbridge. The two routes travel east in a concurrency down the White River valley into Royalton.
