= Michael A. Murphy =

American judge (1837–1909)

Michael Augustus Murphy

Justice of the Supreme Court of Nevada
- In office 1889–1895
- Preceded by: Orville R. Leonard
- Succeeded by: McKaskia Stearns Bonnifield

Attorney General of Nevada
- In office 1879–1883
- Preceded by: John R. Kittrell
- Succeeded by: William H. Davenport

Personal details
- Born: September 29, 1837; New York
- Died: October 26, 1909 (aged 72); Carson City, Nevada
- Spouse: Martha J. Myers (m. 1859; died 1892)
- Children: 5
- Occupation: Lawyer, Judge

Michael Augustus Murphy (September 29, 1837 – October 26, 1909) was a Nevada attorney who served as attorney general of Nevada, and as a justice of the Supreme Court of Nevada from 1889 to 1895.

== Early life and education ==
Born in New York, his parents had moved to McHenry County, Illinois, when he was but an infant, and he grew up on a farm in that state. In 1853, when he was 16 he sailed to California by the Nicaraguan route and joined a brother who had preceded him in Trinity County, where they engaged in mining and farming. The mining excitement at Aurora brought him to Nevada, arriving in the state on April 16, 1863.

He began reading law in 1859, and continued until 1867. He was admitted to the bar in Esmeralda County, Nevada. He had been active politically meanwhile, and in 1868 was elected assessor of Esmeralda county. In 1872 he was elected district attorney of the same county, and held the office for six years.

In 1878 the Republican Party nominated him for attorney general of Nevada. Although his opponent, the incumbent John R. Kittrell, was a strong candidate, Murphy was elected by a large majority. He held the office for four years.

== Judicial service ==
In 1882, Murphy was not renominated by the Republican Party for another term as attorney general. He was instead nominated, and then elected, as a district judge, and also held that office for four years. At the end of his term in 1886, Murphy returned to private practice.

In 1888, he was elected judge of the supreme court of the state, taking office in 1889 and continuing in office for six years, until 1895. In 1898, Murphy once again won the Republican Party nomination for attorney general, but lost in the general election to the candidate from the Silver Party. In 1902 he was elected district judge of the first judicial district, which included Douglas, Esmeralda, Lyon, Ormsby and Storey counties. In this last election he was the only man on his ticket to be elected.

== Personal life and death ==
In September 1859, he married Martha J. Myers, with whom he had five children. Martha died in 1892.

Murphy died at his home in Carson City, Nevada, from pneumonia, following a long illness, at the ago of 72.

Political offices
| Preceded by Orville R. Leonard | Justice of the Supreme Court of Nevada; 1889–1895 | Succeeded by McKaskia Stearns Bonnifield |
| Preceded by John R. Kittrell | Attorney General of Nevada; 1879–1883 | Succeeded by William H. Davenport |
