= Heinie Stafford =

American baseball player (1891-1972)

- Pinch hitter
- Born: November 1, 1891; Orleans, Vermont, U.S.
- Died: January 29, 1972 (aged 80); Lake Worth, Florida, U.S.
- Batted: Right Threw: Right

MLB debut
- October 5, 1916, for the New York Giants

Last MLB appearance
- October 5, 1916, for the New York Giants

MLB statistics
- Batting average: .000
- Home runs: 0
- Runs batted in: 0
- Stats at Baseball Reference

Teams
- New York Giants (1916)

Henry Alexander "Heinie" Stafford (November 1, 1891 – January 29, 1972) was an American Major League Baseball player who played a single game for the New York Giants in 1916.

== Tufts University (1912–1916) ==
Born in Orleans, Vermont, Stafford played in the hotel leagues with Oneonta in 1911 and Saranac Lake in 1912. In 1912, Stafford received a scholarship from Tufts University where he was chosen as the senior class president. Stafford was a star sprinter and captain of the school's baseball team. In 1916, the Tufts baseball team went 18–1 but lost to Harvard for the college championship of the East. An article in the Boston Herald said the following of Stafford: "He has well earned the right to be called the fastest base runner in college baseball, as his record of 22 stolen bases shows. His work at second base is no less notable, for he has taken everything that has come his way, and out of 83 chances he has made five slipups." Stafford ended up batting .404 and leading the nation with 30 runs scored and 24 stolen bases.

== New York Giants (1916) ==
Stafford graduated from Tufts in June 1916 and signed a contract with the New York Giants. After a short stint in the minors, where he played as a left fielder and shortstop, the Giants called Stafford up to the big leagues at the end of the 1916 season. Stafford sat on the bench for the Giants until October 5 – the last day of the season. With two outs in the top of the ninth inning, the Giants trailing by two runs, and the bases empty, the rookie from Vermont was sent in as a pinch hitter for the Giants' pitcher. Stafford hit into a game- and season-ending out for the Giants, as the Brooklyn Dodgers won the pennant.

== Personal plea from John McGraw ==
His pinch-hit out on the last day of the 1916 season turned out to be his only major league at bat. Stafford was offered a job as a research chemist with a textile company and opted for business rather than baseball. In February 1917, Giants manager John McGraw tried to persuade Stafford to give baseball another try. Stafford saved a letter McGraw sent offering "to take you south with me and give you a thorough spring schooling in base ball." McGraw opined that there was "enough promise to you to make me positive that it is worth your while" and cautioned Stafford against "wasting a first class opportunity." Despite McGraw's personal plea, Stafford decided to pursue his work in the textile business.

Stafford returned to baseball briefly during World War I, playing in the industrial leagues where his wartime teammates included Chief Bender and Home Run Baker.

== Life after baseball ==
After the war, Stafford returned to work in the textile business, working on the development of nylon. He retired from the textile business in 1941 and bought a 340-acre (1.4 km^{2}) Vermont dairy farm with a house built in 1832. He gave up farming in the 1950s and went into the real estate business and was later elected to the Vermont General Assembly from Bethel, Vermont. Stafford died at age 80 in 1972 while spending the winter in Lake Worth, Florida.

== Nickname "Heinie" ==
"Heinie" was a popular nickname for German baseball players in the early part of the 20th century. Stafford was one of 22 major league Heinies in the first half of the century. Others include: Heinie Beckendorf (1909–1910); Heinie Berger (1907–1910); Heinie Groh (1912–1927); Heinie Manush (1923–1939) (the only Hall of Fame "Heinie"); Heinie Meine (1922–1934); Heinie Mueller (1920–1935); Heinie Mueller (1938–1941); Heinie Peitz (1892–1913); Heinie Reitz (1893–1899); Heinie Sand (1923–1928); Heinie Schuble (1927–1936); Heinie Smith (1897–1903); Heinie Wagner (1902–1918); and Heinie Zimmerman (1907–1919). No player since World War II has been identified by the nickname Heinie.
