= Harrington Block =

- U.S. National Register of Historic Places
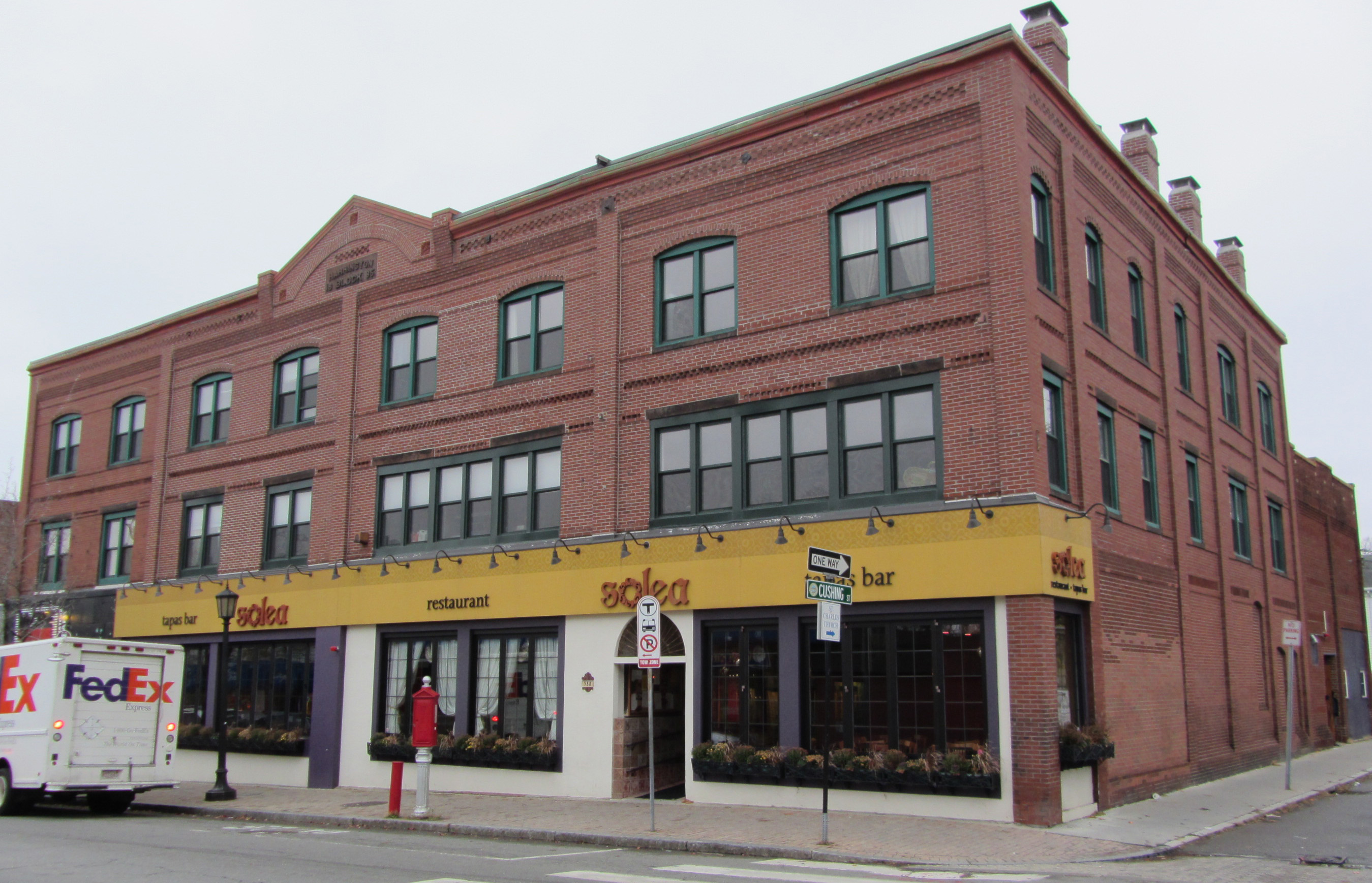

- Location within Massachusetts Location within the United States
- Location: 376–390 Moody St., Waltham, Massachusetts
- Coordinates: 42°22′10.6″N 71°14′13.2″W
- Built: 1884
- Architect: Parks, C.F.
- Architectural style: Queen Anne, Panel Brick
- MPS: Waltham MRA
- NRHP reference No.: 89001543
- Added to NRHP: September 28, 1989

The Harrington Block is a historic commercial and retail building at 376–390 Moody Street in Waltham, Massachusetts. The three-story brick building was built 1884–85 by Charles Harrington, a local real estate speculator who was also employed by the Boston Manufacturing Company. It is one of the city's few Queen Anne commercial building, and is the oldest commercial building on Moody Street to escape major alteration. The ground floor originally housed retail establishments (as it does now), while the upper floors were residential.

The building was listed on the National Register of Historic Places in 1989.

== See also ==
- National Register of Historic Places listings in Waltham, Massachusetts
