= Harrington–Birchett House =

Historic house in Tempe, Arizona

- U.S. National Register of Historic Places
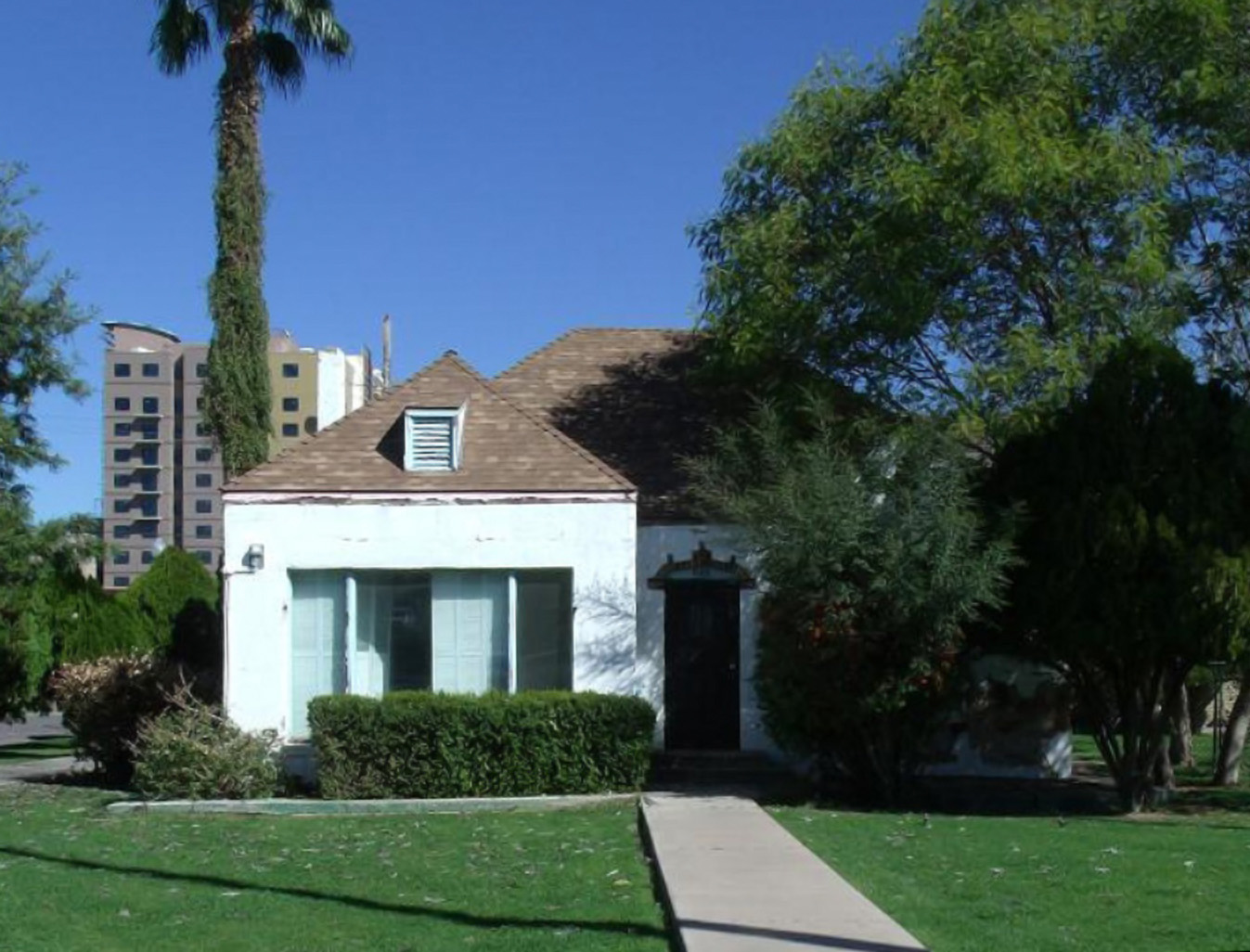
- Front facade on 7th Street

- Location within Arizona Location within the United States
- Location: 202 E. 7th St., Tempe, Arizona
- Coordinates: 33°25′24″N 111°56′7″W
- Area: less than one acre
- Built: 1895
- Built by: Goodwin brothers
- Architectural style: Tudor Revival
- MPS: Tempe MRA
- NRHP reference No.: 84000716
- Added to NRHP: May 7, 1984

The Harrington–Birchett House is a former residence in downtown Tempe, Arizona. Originally built in 1895, the house was listed on the National Register of Historic Places in 1984.

== History ==
The house was built in 1895 as part of the J.W. Harrington homestead. It was built by the Goodwin brothers, who were then operating a brick-making business in Tempe. In 1904, the house was acquired by Mattie Birchett, in the same year that her son, Joseph T. Birchett, married. Mattie, her husband Joseph and their family lived in the home until circa 1920, when Joseph retired from the Birchett Brothers mercantile store for health reasons.

After Mattie's death in 1925, the house became a rental property until Joseph T. and Guess Birchett reoccupied it in the early 1930s. Joseph T. was a partner in the mercantile store with his brother John, in addition to owning considerable real estate in the area; he was also a director of the Tempe National Bank and served as mayor of Tempe from 1912 to 1914. Guess was known locally as the "bird-lady" for her research on birds and nature; the United States Fish and Wildlife Service even designated her home as a federally protected bird sanctuary from 1940 to 1970. She was the sister of Honor Anderson Moeur, wife of Governor Benjamin B. Moeur. The family occupied the Harrington–Birchett home because of its proximity to her sister's family's house. She also participated in beautification efforts in the city of Tempe and was named its Centennial Queen in 1971. Guess died in 1979.

Ownership of the house passed to Arizona State University when it purchased the property in 1989. As part of improvements to the property related to the development of the College Avenue Commons building to the east, a non-contributing slump block garage built in 1937 was demolished.

== Architecture ==
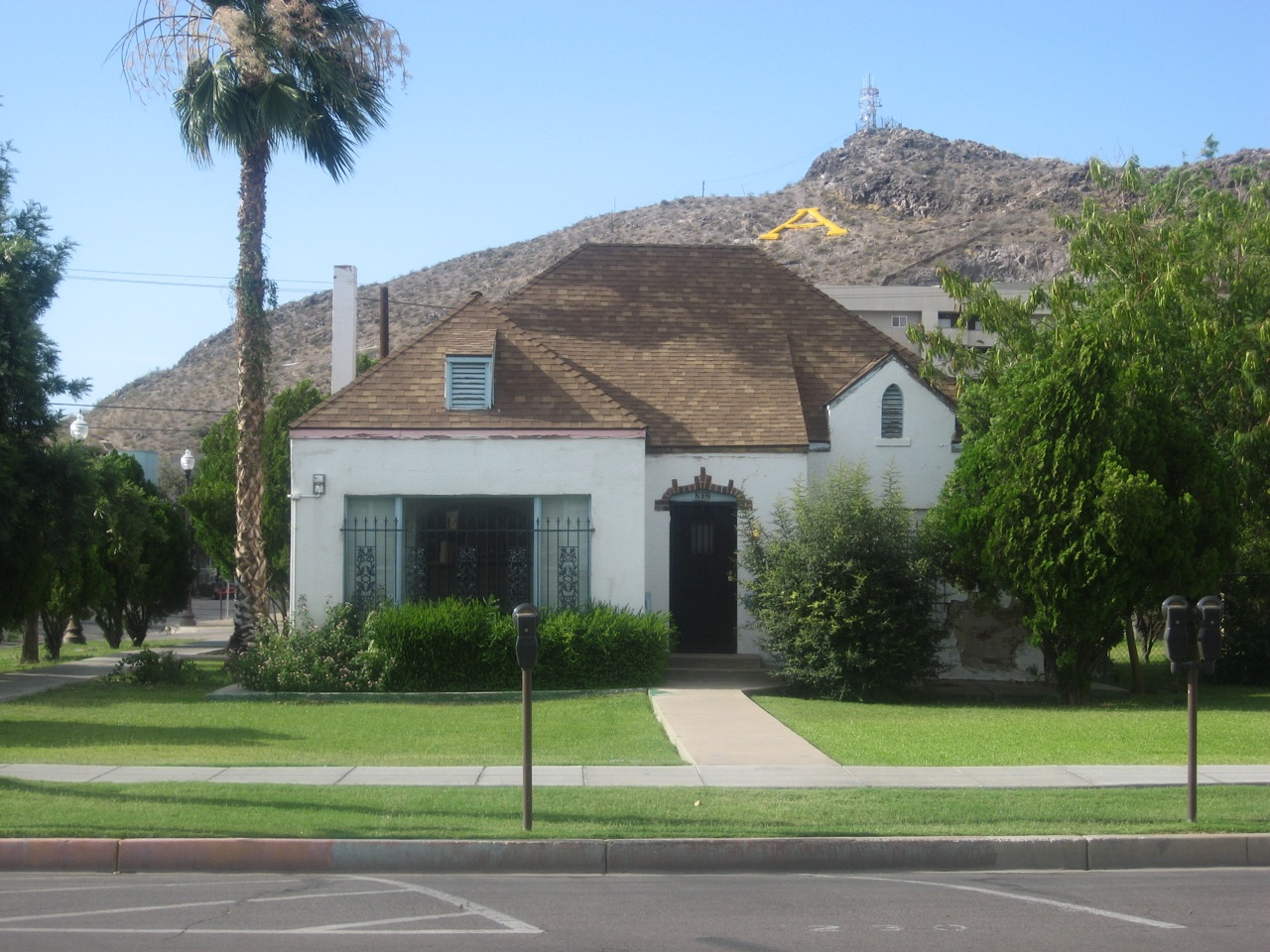
Harrington–Birchett House in 2009

The Harrington–Birchett House was built as a brick Victorian cottage; however, a 1931 remodeling changed it into a Period Revival-style home with Tudor elements, including the enclosure of the house's porches. The house has an exterior coating of stucco over its brick face.

The house features an irregular plan with a steeply pitched hip roof. The front facade has a setback for the central entryway and again on the east end. The doorway is framed by two concrete steps and set into a semi-elliptical arch made of decorative brick. Wood-framed windows are either in double-hung or casement arrangements. A double garage at the rear of the house has two car doors.

Stylistically, the complete transformation of the home's architectural style is "unusual".
