= Samuel Harrington House =

Historic house in Massachusetts, United States

- U.S. National Register of Historic Places
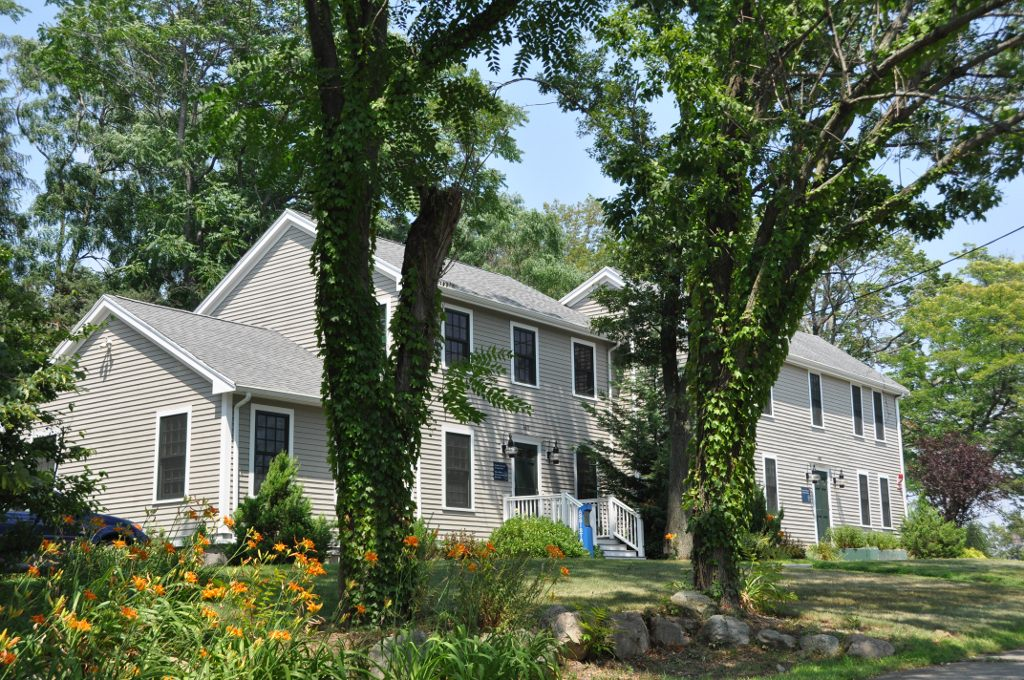

- Location within Massachusetts Location within the United States
- Location: Old South St., Waltham, Massachusetts
- Coordinates: 42°21′47″N 71°15′35″W
- Architectural style: Georgian
- MPS: Waltham MRA
- NRHP reference No.: 89001508
- Added to NRHP: September 28, 1989

The Samuel Harrington House is a historic house on Old South Street in Waltham, Massachusetts. Now on the campus of Brandeis University, it houses the Rabb School of Continuing Studies. It was built in middle of the 18th century, and is one of the city's few houses to survive from that period. It remained in the Harrington family into the 20th century. The house was listed on the National Register of Historic Places in 1989, where it is listed at 475 South Street.

== Description and history ==
The Samuel Harrington House is located between Old South Street and South Street near the southeastern end of the Brandeis University Campus. It has a 2 1/2-story wood-frame structure, five bays wide, with a side-gable roof and large central chimney. A pair of ells, the first two-story and the second one, extend to its left, with a secondary entrance in the first ell.

The land on which the house stands was bought by Robert Harrington in 1684. The first firm documentary evidence of the house's existence dates to 1793, but stylistic evidence suggests it was built in the late First Period, c. 1730. It was likely built by Robert's son Samuel as a wedding present for his son, also named Samuel. The house served briefly as an inn, as South Street was at the time a major road leading to the Post Road (now United States Route 20). The last Harrington to own the property died in the 1960s.

== See also ==
- National Register of Historic Places listings in Waltham, Massachusetts
