= Bethel, Vermont =

- Town
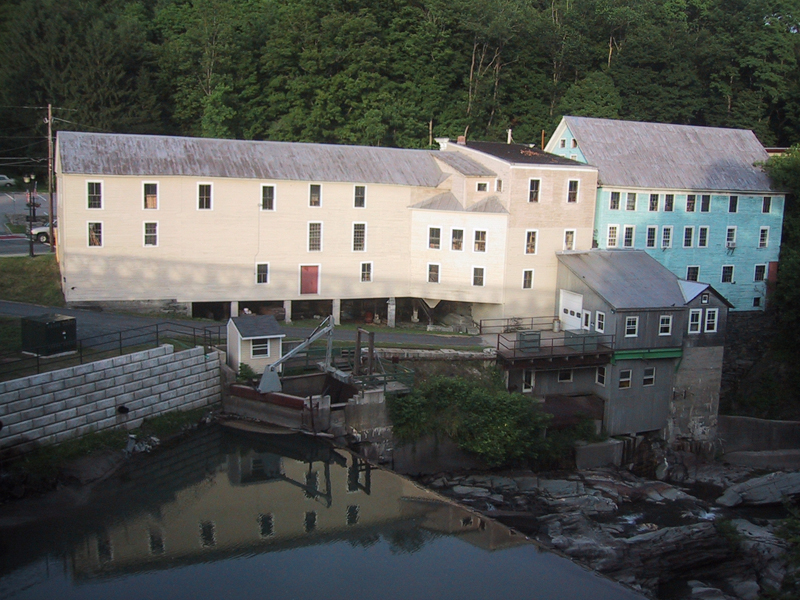
- Old mill buildings in Bethel, Vermont

- Location in Windsor County and the state of Vermont.
- Coordinates: 43°51′20″N 72°40′42″W
- Country: United States
- State: Vermont
- County: Windsor
- Chartered: 1779 (Vermont)
- Communities: Bethel; Bethel Gilead; East Bethel; Lilliesville; Lympus

Area
  - Total: 45.4 sq mi (117.7 km^{2})
  - Land: 45.2 sq mi (117.0 km^{2})
  - Water: 0.27 sq mi (0.7 km^{2})
- Elevation: 1,004 ft (306 m)

Population (2020)
  - Total: 1,942
  - Density: 42.99/sq mi (16.60/km^{2})
- Time zone: UTC-5 (EST)
  - Summer (DST): UTC-4 (EDT)
- ZIP Codes: 05032 (Bethel); 05060 (Randolph)
- Area code: 802
- FIPS code: 50-05800
- GNIS feature ID: 1462043
- Website: townofbethelvt.com

Bethel is a town in Windsor County, Vermont, United States. The population was 1,942 at the 2020 census. The town includes the locations of Bethel village, Bethel-Gilead, East Bethel, Lilliesville, Lympus (formerly Olympus), and West Bethel. Bethel is best known for being the source of Bethel White granite which was used to build Washington Union Station and the National Museum of Natural History. Bethel was the first town created by the independent Republic of Vermont in 1779 and was named after the Biblical village of Bethel.

== Etymology ==
Dudley Chase, a grantee, was on a surveying expedition with a group of men. The men made camp in an area near the (now)entrance to Gilead Brook road where there is a group of large moss covered rocks. The men slept on the rocks and upon waking, Dudley Chase declared that it was the best night sleeping he had just like the Biblical experience of Jacob when sleeping in a field with a stone for a pillow. In the Biblical story, Jacob named the place Beth-el (House of God). Chase's associates were so impressed that they named the town the same.

== Geography ==
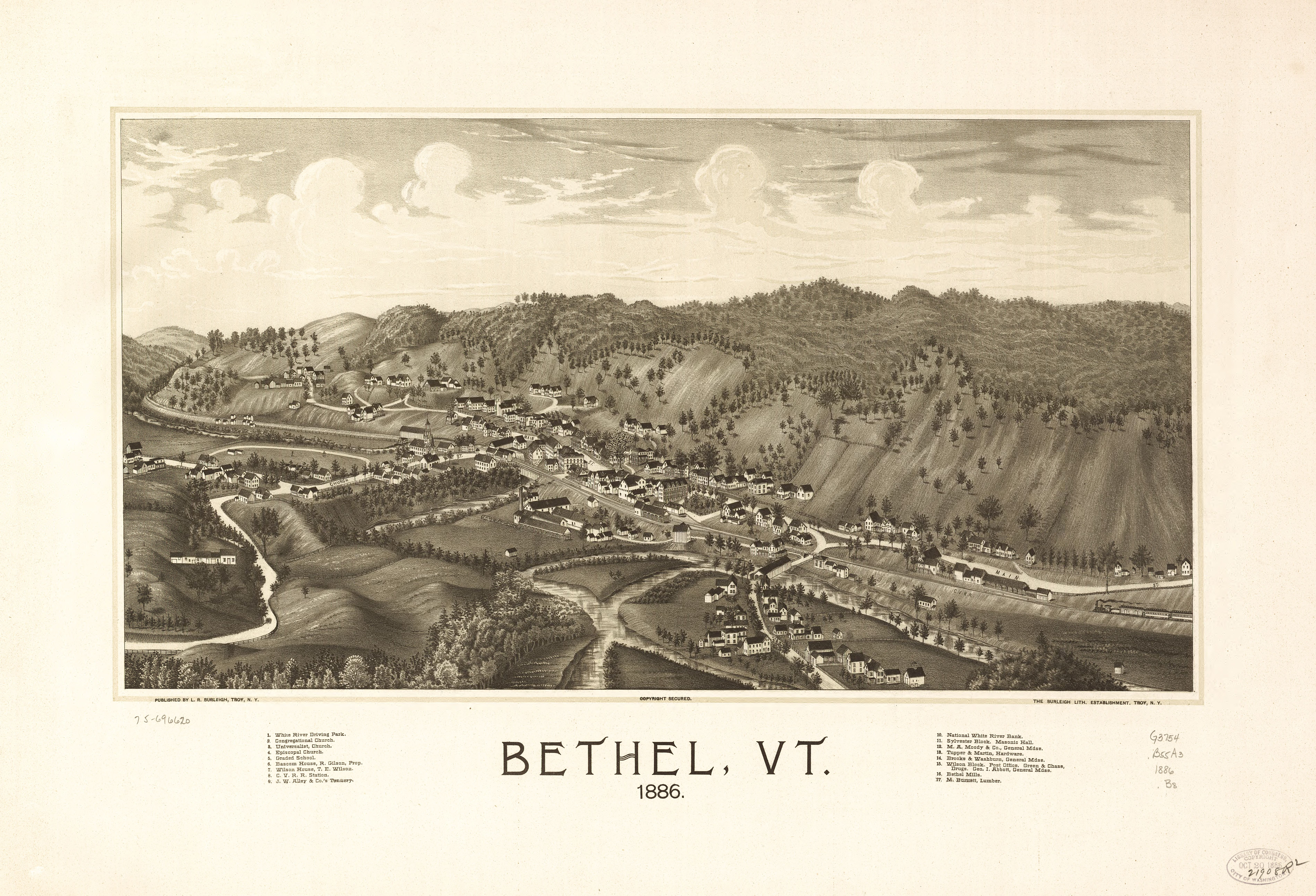
Lithograph of Bethel from 1886 by L.R. Burleigh with list of landmarks

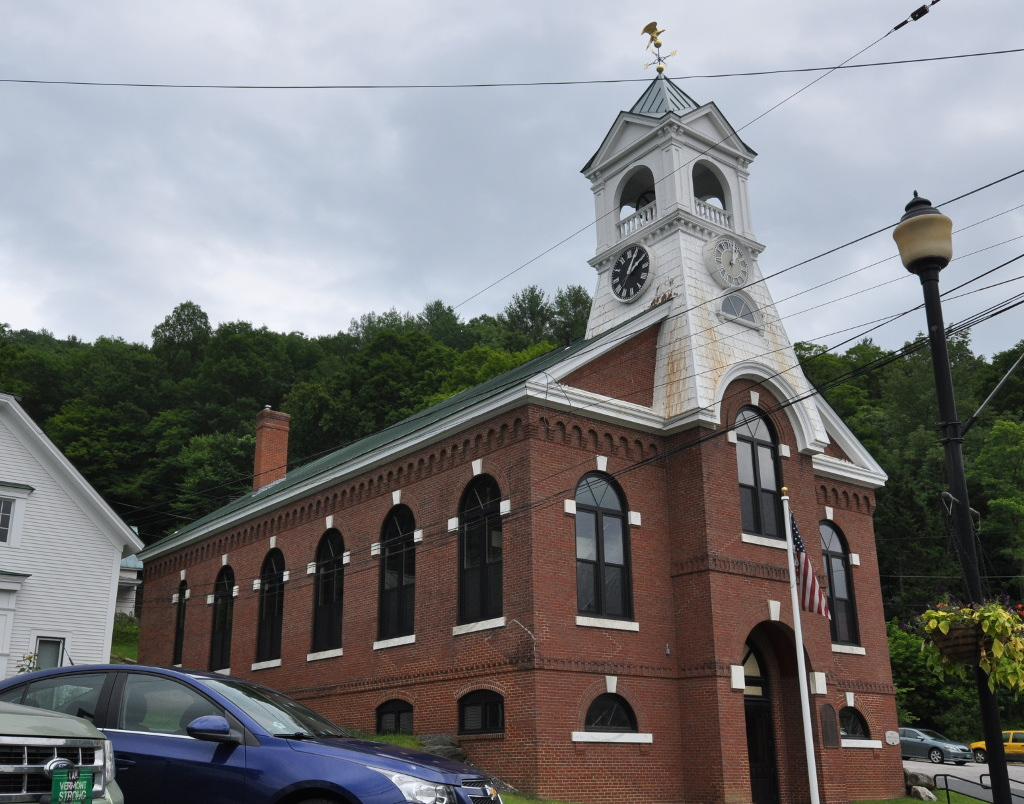
Bethel Town Hall

According to the United States Census Bureau, the town has a total area of 45.4 square miles (117.7 km^{2}), of which 45.2 square miles (117.0 km^{2}) is land and 0.27 square miles (0.7 km^{2}), or 0.58%, is water.

Bethel is crossed by Interstate 89 (Exit 3 serves the town), Vermont Route 12 and Vermont Route 107. Amtrak's Vermonter train, operating daily between St. Albans and Washington, DC also passes through, but does not stop in town as it traverses the New England Central Railroad. The closest stations are Randolph to the north and White River Junction to the southeast.

=== Climate ===
This climatic region is typified by large seasonal temperature differences, with warm to hot (and often humid) summers and cold (sometimes severely cold) winters. According to the Köppen Climate Classification system, Bethel has a humid continental climate, abbreviated "Dfb" on climate maps.

== Demographics ==
Historical population
| Census | Pop. | Note | %± |
|---|---|---|---|
| 1790 | 473 | | — |
| 1800 | 913 | | 93.0% |
| 1810 | 1,041 | | 14.0% |
| 1820 | 1,318 | | 26.6% |
| 1830 | 1,667 | | 26.5% |
| 1840 | 1,886 | | 13.1% |
| 1850 | 1,730 | | −8.3% |
| 1860 | 1,834 | | 6.0% |
| 1870 | 1,817 | | −0.9% |
| 1880 | 1,693 | | −6.8% |
| 1890 | 1,448 | | −14.5% |
| 1900 | 1,611 | | 11.3% |
| 1910 | 1,943 | | 20.6% |
| 1920 | 1,782 | | −8.3% |
| 1930 | 1,650 | | −7.4% |
| 1940 | 1,477 | | −10.5% |
| 1950 | 1,534 | | 3.9% |
| 1960 | 1,356 | | −11.6% |
| 1970 | 1,347 | | −0.7% |
| 1980 | 1,715 | | 27.3% |
| 1990 | 1,866 | | 8.8% |
| 2000 | 1,968 | | 5.5% |
| 2010 | 2,030 | | 3.2% |
| 2020 | 1,942 | | −4.3% |
U.S. Decennial Census

As of the census of 2000, there were 1,968 people, 817 households, and 548 families residing in the town. The population density was 43.4 people per square mile (16.8/km^{2}). There were 956 housing units at an average density of 21.1 per square mile (8.1/km^{2}). The racial makeup of the town was 97.82% White, 0.25% African American, 0.10% Native American, 0.36% Asian, 0.05% Pacific Islander, 0.05% from other races, and 1.37% from two or more races. Hispanic or Latino of any race were 1.47% of the population.

There were 817 households, out of which 30.8% had children under the age of 18 living with them, 53.2% were married couples living together, 9.9% had a female householder with no husband present, and 32.9% were non-families. 25.9% of all households were made up of individuals, and 10.0% had someone living alone who was 65 years of age or older. The average household size was 2.41 and the average family size was 2.87.

In the town, the population was spread out, with 24.7% under the age of 18, 6.3% from 18 to 24, 28.8% from 25 to 44, 27.3% from 45 to 64, and 13.0% who were 65 years of age or older. The median age was 39 years. For every 100 females, there were 96.2 males. For every 100 females age 18 and over, there were 94.0 males.

The median income for a household in the town of Bethel was $34,141, and the median income for a family was $41,250. Males had a median income of $30,109 versus $21,829 for females. The per capita income for the town was $17,577. About 7.9% of families and 10.6% of the population were below the poverty line, including 9.7% of those under age 18 and 15.7% of those age 65 or over.

== Education ==
Residents of Bethel in grades Pre-K–5 attend the Bethel Elementary School. Until July 2018, students in grades 7–12 attended Whitcomb Junior-Senior High School. In October 2017, residents of Bethel and South Royalton voted to merge as White River Unified School District in order to comply with Vermont Act 46. Those in grade 6–8 attend White River Valley Middle School, which is on the Bethel School campus. Grades 9–12 attend White River Valley High School. The two towns have a six-person school board composed of three members from each town. Bethel is part of the White River Valley Supervisory Union which serves the towns of Bethel, Chelsea, South Royalton, Tunbridge, Sharon, Stockbridge, Strafford, and Rochester.

== Bethel Revitalization Initiative ==
Since 2016, the town has focused on revitalizing the downtown. Each Fall, there is a "Bethel Better Block" event with a focus on bringing people downtown and fostering community with pop up shops and street art. In the Winter, Bethel presents Bethel University, a chance for community members to teach and learn from each other. In Spring of 2017, the Vermont Arts Council awarded Bethel a grant that funded three community arts projects, including a trout mural, lamp post banners by a local artist, and sculpture benches.

== Notable people ==
- Harry Burrell, Major League Baseball pitcher and right fielder; born in Bethel
- Richard McCormack, member of the Vermont Senate
- Pat Putnam, MLB first baseman, born in Bethel
- Heinie Stafford, MLB pitcher and Vermont legislator
- Stephen Thomas, awarded a Medal of Honor for his actions in the Civil War
- Larry Townsend, Vermont legislator
- Kirk White, Masonic and Pagan lecturer and author, and Vermont legislator

== In popular culture ==
- In 2005, a Bethel teen was the focus of an episode of the MTV reality show, MADE.
