= John Garber (judge) =

American judge (1833–1908)

- Garber c. 1902

Justice of the Supreme Court of Nevada
- In office January 2, 1871 – November 7, 1872
- Preceded by: J. Neely Johnson
- Succeeded by: Charles H. Belknap

Personal details
- Born: November 9, 1833 Staunton, Virginia
- Died: December 14, 1908 (aged 75) Berkeley, California
- Spouse: Juliet White
- Education: University of Virginia
- Occupation: Lawyer, Judge

John Garber (November 9, 1833 – December 14, 1908) was a justice of the Supreme Court of Nevada from 1871 to 1872.

== Biography ==
Born in Staunton, Virginia, Garber matriculated at the University of Virginia in 1852, and after graduating, taught school for a short time and worked as a civil engineer for two years on the construction of the Virginia Central Railroad, from Staunton to Richmond. He studied law in Virginia to gain admission to the bar, and then moved to San Francisco, California, in 1857, where he briefly practiced law with his uncle, Joseph G. Baldwin, before moving to Santa Cruz, California for eighteen months, practicing law and serving as a Justice of the Peace. He practiced in Nevada City, California from 1859 to May 1863, then moved to Austin, Nevada, where he practiced until 1867. During that time he met and married Juliet White. He then returned to San Francisco, where he practice law until 1870.

In 1870, Garber moved to Virginia City, Nevada, where he practiced mining law until his election to the territorial supreme court in November of that year. He served from 1871 until his resignation on November 7, 1872, thereafter moving back to California to resume private practice. In February 1904, President Theodore Roosevelt offered Garber a seat on the Isthmian Canal Commission, which Garber declined.

Garber died at his home in Berkeley, California following an attack of typhoid fever.

Political offices
Preceded by J. Neely Johnson	Justice of the Supreme Court of Nevada; 1871–1872	Succeeded by Charles H. Belknap
