= Vermont Route 107 =

State highway in Windsor County, Vermont, US

Vermont Route 107
- VT 107 highlighted in red

Route information
- Maintained by VTrans
- Length: 13.503 mi (21.731 km)

Major junctions
- West end: VT 100 in Stockbridge
- I-89 in Royalton
- East end: VT 14 in Royalton

Location
- Country: United States
- State: Vermont
- Counties: Windsor

Highway system
- State highways in Vermont
← VT 106	→ VT 108

Vermont Route 107 (VT 107) is an east–west state highway in Windsor County, Vermont, United States. It runs for 13.503 miles (21.7 km) from VT 100 in Stockbridge in the west to VT 14 in Royalton in the east. VT 107 mostly serves to connect VT 100 to Interstate 89 (I-89).

== Route description ==
VT 107 begins at an intersection with VT 100 in the town of Stockbridge. It follows the course of the White River east and northeast through the community of Riverside. Northeast of Riverside, VT 107 enters the town of Bethel, where it intersects VT 12. The two roads run concurrently for just under 2 miles (3.2 km). Near the Bethel Town Forest, the two routes split; VT 12 heads west while VT 107 heads east into the town of Royalton. Near its eastern end, VT 107 intersects I-89 at a folded diamond interchange. The route ends at VT 14 near the center of the town.

== Major intersections ==
The entire route is in Windsor County.

Location	mi	km	Destinations	Notes
Stockbridge	0.000	0.000	VT 100 – Pittsfield, Killington, Rutland, Rochester	Western terminus
Bethel	8.236	13.255	VT 12 south (Creek Road) – Barnard, Woodstock	Western end of concurrency with VT 12
Bethel	10.102	16.258	VT 12 north (Main Street) – Bethel, Randolph	Eastern end of concurrency with VT 12
Royalton	12.709– 12.925	20.453– 20.801	I-89 – White River Junction, Barre, Montpelier	Exit 3 on I-89; partial cloverleaf interchange
Royalton	13.503	21.731	VT 14 – East Randolph, Royalton	Eastern terminus
1.000 mi = 1.609 km; 1.000 km = 0.621 mi: Concurrency terminus

== See also ==
- List of state highways in Vermont
