= Stockbridge, Vermont =

- Town
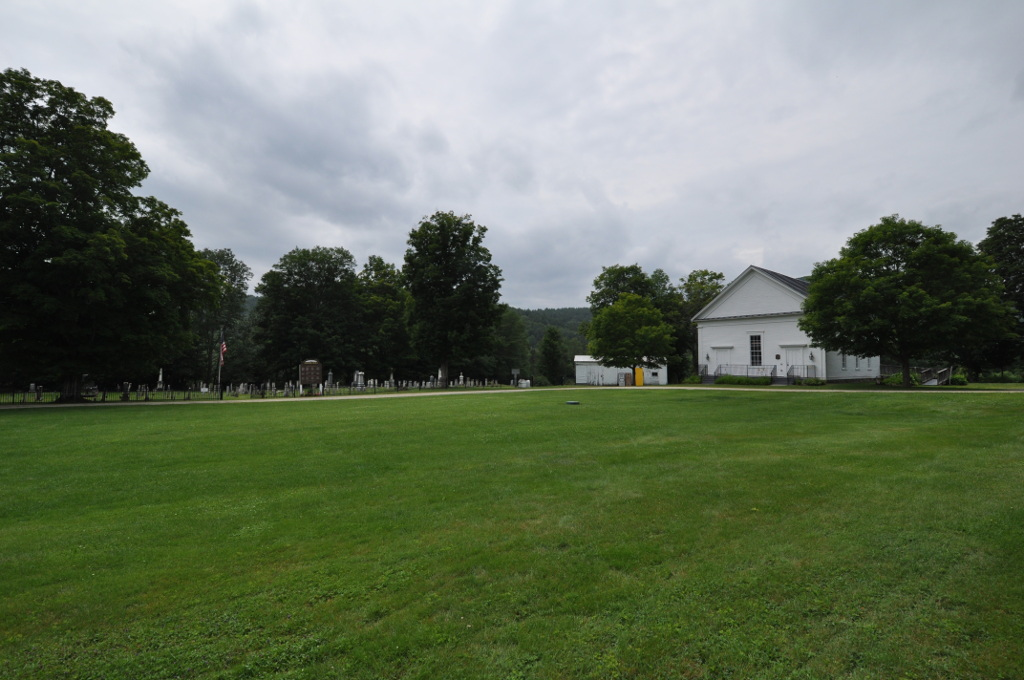
- Stockbridge Common Historic District

- Location in Windsor County and the state of Vermont.
- Coordinates: 43°45′32″N 72°44′46″W
- Country: United States
- State: Vermont
- County: Windsor
- Communities: Stockbridge; Gaysville; Riverside

Area
  - Total: 46.2 sq mi (119.6 km^{2})
  - Land: 45.9 sq mi (118.9 km^{2})
  - Water: 0.27 sq mi (0.7 km^{2})
- Elevation: 925 ft (282 m)

Population (2020)
  - Total: 718
  - Density: 15.6/sq mi (6.04/km^{2})
- Time zone: UTC-5 (Eastern (EST))
  - Summer (DST): UTC-4 (EDT)
- ZIP Codes: 05772 (Stockbridge); 05746 (Gaysville)
- Area code: 802
- FIPS code: 50-70375
- GNIS feature ID: 1462218
- Website: stockbridgevt.gov

Stockbridge is a town in Windsor County, Vermont, United States, which contains the village of Gaysville. The population was 718 at the 2020 census. Stockbridge was one of thirteen Vermont towns isolated by flooding caused by Hurricane Irene in 2011.

== Geography ==
According to the United States Census Bureau, the town has a total area of 46.2 square miles (119.6 km^{2}), of which 45.9 square miles (118.9 km^{2}) are land and 0.27 square miles (0.7 km^{2}), or 0.60%, is water.

== Demographics ==
Historical population
Census	Pop.	Note	%±
1790	100		—
1800	432		332.0%
1810	700		62.0%
1820	964		37.7%
1830	1,333		38.3%
1840	1,499		12.5%
1850	1,327		−11.5%
1860	1,264		−4.7%
1870	1,269		0.4%
1880	1,124		−11.4%
1890	894		−20.5%
1900	822		−8.1%
1910	737		−10.3%
1920	618		−16.1%
1930	460		−25.6%
1940	490		6.5%
1950	427		−12.9%
1960	392		−8.2%
1970	389		−0.8%
1980	508		30.6%
1990	618		21.7%
2000	674		9.1%
2010	736		9.2%
2020	718		−2.4%
U.S. Decennial Census

As of the census of 2000, there were 674 people, 281 households, and 193 families residing in the town. The population density was 14.6 people per square mile (5.6/km^{2}). There were 528 housing units at an average density of 11.4 per square mile (4.4/km^{2}). The racial makeup of the town was 98.37% White, 0.59% African American, 0.45% Native American, 0.45% Asian and 0.15% Pacific Islander. Hispanic or Latino of any race were 0.45% of the population.

There were 281 households, out of which 29.9% had children under the age of 18 living with them, 58.0% were married couples living together, 6.8% had a female householder with no husband present, and 31.3% were non-families. 22.8% of all households were made up of individuals, and 9.3% had someone living alone who was 65 years of age or older. The average household size was 2.40 and the average family size was 2.81.

In the town, the population was spread out, with 22.7% under the age of 18, 5.0% from 18 to 24, 29.2% from 25 to 44, 27.4% from 45 to 64, and 15.6% who were 65 years of age or older. The median age was 41 years. For every 100 females, there were 104.2 males. For every 100 females age 18 and over, there were 100.4 males.

The median income for a household in the town was $37,292, and the median income for a family was $44,821. Males had a median income of $30,417 versus $25,000 for females. The per capita income for the town was $21,379. About 2.0% of families and 5.3% of the population were below the poverty line, including 3.2% of those under age 18 and 8.0% of those age 65 or over.

== Education ==
A school was built on South Hill in 1896 making it the ninth school in operation in the town of Stockbridge and village of Gaysville. In 1897, there were 169 students in town with some schools with as few as 6 students, and some with more than 25. In 1956, Stockbridge Central School (SCS) was built on Route 107 to combine the students from the three remaining schools in town. SCS is a pre-kindergarten through 6th grade elementary school.

== Notable people ==
- Orestes Brownson, intellectual, preacher, and labor organizer
- Mark W. Bullard, Oregon pioneer
- Elias Keyes, American politician, judge, U.S. Representative from Vermont
- George Crockett Strong, General during the U.S. Civil War, born in Stockbridge
