= Topsham Historic District =

Historic district in Maine, United States

- U.S. National Register of Historic Places
- U.S. Historic district
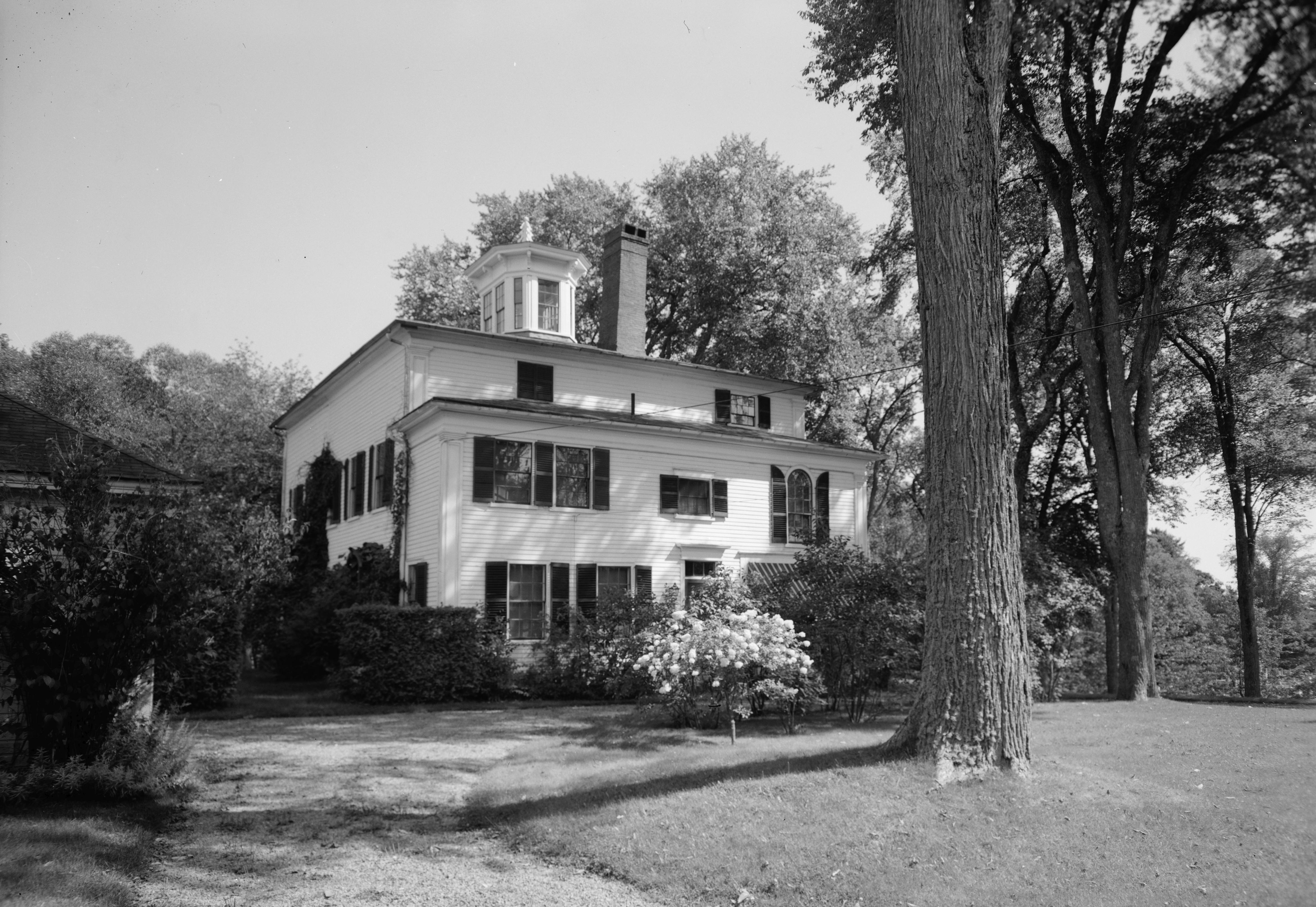

- Location within Maine Location within the United States
- Location: Elm, Main, and Green Sts., Topsham, Maine
- Coordinates: 43°55′36″N 69°57′42.6″W
- Area: 45 acres (18 ha)
- Built: 1800
- Architectural style: Greek Revival, Federal
- NRHP reference No.: 78000198
- Added to NRHP: January 9, 1978

The Topsham Historic District encompasses the historic village center of Topsham, Maine. Extending along parts of Elm, Green, and Pleasant Streets, the area has a fine collection of 19th and early 20th-century architecture, with the majority built before 1850. It is almost entirely residential, with only a few non-residential uses, including a church. The district was listed on the National Register of Historic Places in 1978.

== Description and history ==
The town of Topsham is located on the north bank of the Androscoggin River, opposite the town of Brunswick in the western part of Maine's Mid Coast region. Area for a town center was set aside in the 1639, but the town was abandoned during conflicts with local indigenous persons of the late 17th and early 18th centuries. It was resettled beginning in 1714 under the auspices of the Pejepscot Proprietors, a Boston-based consortium of businessmen, but permanent occupation did not take place until the 1730s. It continued to be subjected to native attacks in King George's War and the French and Indian War, hampering growth until the 1760s. Sawmills and gristmills were built on the river, beginning significant growth in both Topsham and Brunswick. A bridge was built across the river in 1796.

The historic section of Topsham Village is roughly centered on the junction of Elm, Pleasant, and Green Streets. It extends south on Green Street and north on Pleasant Street, as far as Perkins Street. Its western extent is Main Street (United States Route 201), where a few houses on the east side are included, and extends east on the north side of Elm Street as far as the railroad right-of-way just west of Maine State Route 196. The district has 58 historic buildings, most of which are residences built before 1850. Fully half the buildings are Federal in style, with Greek Revival architecture also well represented. The only buildings not originally built as a residence are the 1835 Federal-style Baptist church, and the town offices, which are housed in a c. 1840 academy, restyled about 1900 in the Colonial Revival style.

== See also ==
- National Register of Historic Places listings in Sagadahoc County, Maine
