= Pejepscot Proprietors =

Colonial land investors of Maine, U.S.

- Company type: Privately held company
- Industry: Real property
- Founded: 1714
- Defunct: 1764
- Fate: Disbanded
- Headquarters: Pejepscot, Maine, United States
- Areas served: Brunswick, Maine; Topsham, Maine; Harpswell, Maine
- Products: Land
- Number of employees: 8 (1714)

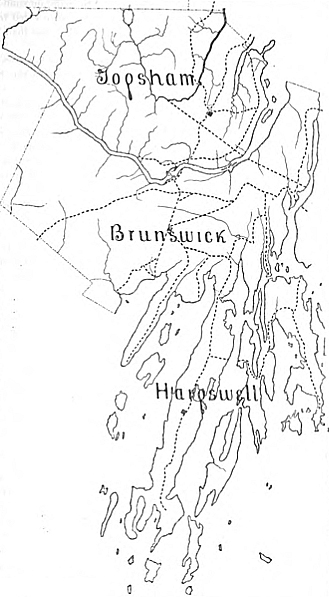
Roads in Brunswick, Topsham and Harpswell, Maine c. 1764

The Pejepscot Proprietors was a company of land investors who colonized the current towns of Brunswick, Topsham and Harpswell, Maine, between 1715 and 1814.

The area known as Pejepscot, Maine, was first inhabited by the Wabanaki Native Americans. During the European colonization of the Americas, the first settler was Thomas Purchase, settling on the banks of the Androscoggin River in Brunswick, at the site of Fort Andross and Pejepscot Falls. After the Native American wars came to a close, the proprietors acquired the land holdings from Purchase's successor, Richard Wharton, in the Maine district of the Province of Massachusetts Bay, and furthered the colonization of Maine.

== History ==
The first settler of Pejepscot was Thomas Purchase in 1628. After four years of occupancy, Purchase was issued a deed from the Plymouth Company in 1632 for the land. Purchase moved to Boston after a raid on his house during King Philip's War and the land was bought by Richard Wharton on October 10, 1683.

After Wharton passed away Ephraim Savage, of Boston was given authority by the Massachusetts Superior Court to sell the land in order to liquidate Wharton's debts. On September 5, 1714 Savage sold the land to the Pejepscot Proprietors. The first members of the proprietors included Thomas Hutchinson, Adam Winthrop, John Watts, David Jeffries, Stephen Minot, Oliver Noyes, John Ruck of Boston, Massachusetts, and John Wentworth of Portsmouth, New Hampshire.

The sum of the transaction was £140 and would be known as the Pejepscot Purchase. The Pejepscot proprietors disband after the incorporations of the three towns.

Town incorporation dates
Town	Year of name change
Brunswick, Maine	1717
Harpswell, Maine	1733
Topsham, Maine	1764
