= Brunswick Falls =

Dam and waterfall in Brunswick and Topsham, Maine

- Pejepscot Falls
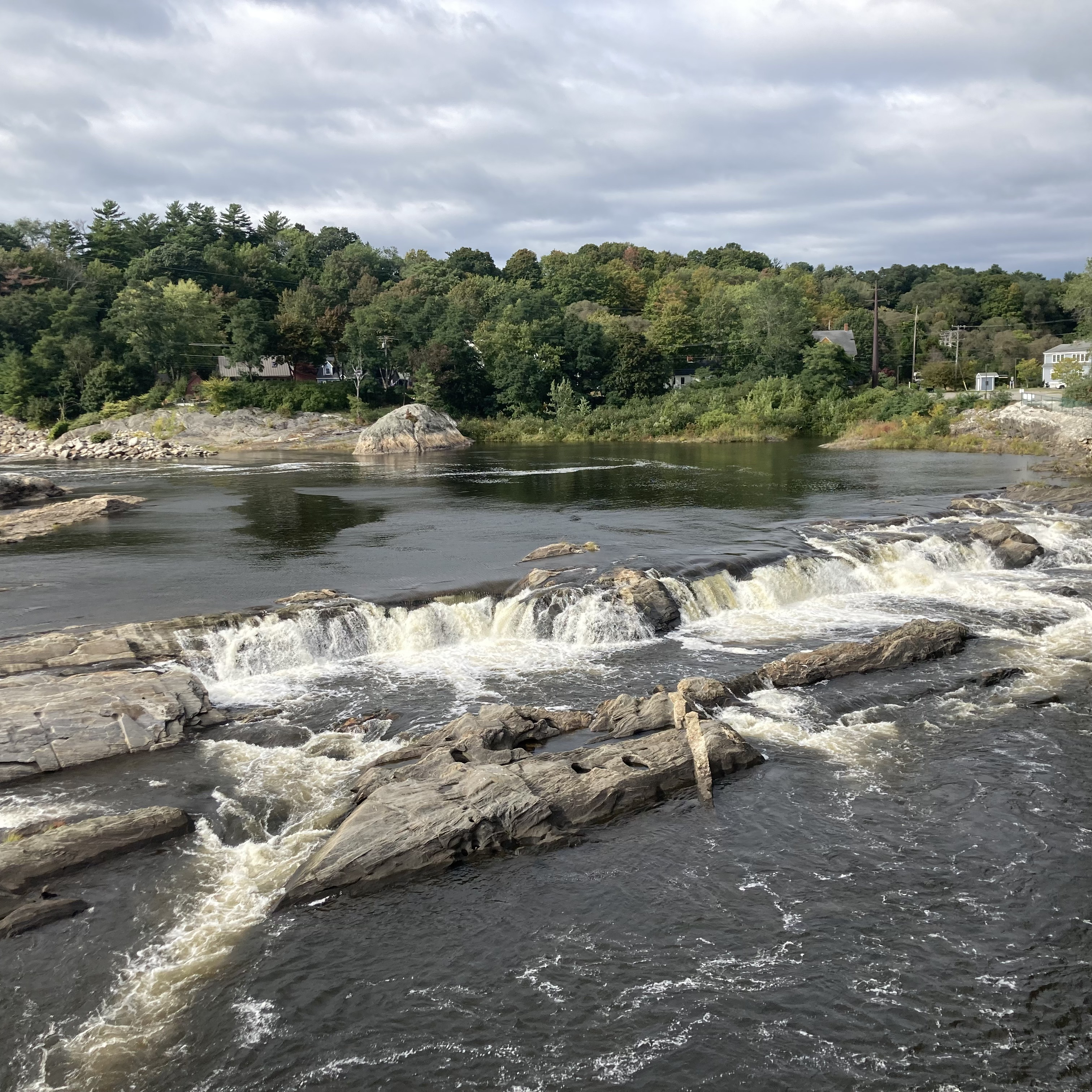
- Brunswick Falls (Middle tier) from the Frank J. Wood Bridge in 2022

- Location within Maine
- Location: Brunswick and Topsham, Maine, US
- Coordinates: 43.9212°N 69.9661°W
- Type: Cascade
- Total height: 41.83 ft (12.75 m) (1835)
- Number of drops: 3
- Run: 1,280 ft (390 m) (1835)
- Watercourse: Androscoggin River
- Average flow rate: 85,000 cu ft/s (2,400 m^{3}/s)

Brunswick Falls, also known as Pejepscot Falls, lie on a rocky section of the Androscoggin River, bordering the towns of Brunswick and Topsham, Maine, United States. First occupied by Paleoindians and the Wabanaki Native Americans, the falls were a plentiful resource for food and trade. Throughout colonial history, the Industrial Revolution, and into the 21st century, the falls have been a vital part of Brunswick and Topsham's economy, harnessing its power for energy development.

== Ancient history ==
=== Pre-human ===
Around 25,000 years ago all of New England, including Maine, was covered by the massive Laurentide Ice Sheet. Climate change forced the sheet of ice to start receding, with the last of the glacial ice disappearing from Maine by 10,000 years ago.

Large sand dunes accumulated in this glacial period as winds picked up outwash sand forming river valleys, such as the Androscoggin River. As the climate warmed, the modern stream and river network was soon established, including Brunswick Falls.

The formation of the natural falls consists of granite and gneiss, with three levels (prior to 1981). The rocks in the middle falls projects above the water at several points, serving as a natural island (Shad Island), to the several sections of the falls.

=== Indigenous peoples ===
Paleo-Indians, over several millennia, settled into the area along the Androscoggin River and Brunswick Falls, eventually becoming the Wabanaki Native Americans, encompassing what is today Brunswick, Topsham and Harpswell, Maine. The Wabanakis called this area of Maine Pejepscot and lived there until the 1600s, when the first Europeans arrived. During the time of the Wabanaki natives, they embraced the resources of the falls. Pejepscot Falls, as it was then called, was the site of a trading post that the Wabanakis established to exchange furs with other local Native American tribes.

== European settlement ==
In the year 1628, Thomas Purchase of England was the first European settler to set foot in Pejepscot, building his own trading post at Pejepscot Falls. Purchase had an agreement with the natives for the land, as long as they were still able to hunt and fish at the falls. Four years later, in 1632, the Plymouth Company granted a patent to the land known as Pejepscot, including the falls, to Purchase and his brother-in-law, George Way. The falls had a rich stock of salmon, sturgeon and shad, which Purchase took advantage of, shipping barrels of fish laden with salt to London.

During the various Native American Wars in the region, there were two fortifications established adjacent to the falls. During King William's War, the first fort was built in 1688: Fort Andross, commanded by Major Thomas Savage and under the authority of the Dominion of New England. During King Philip's War, the second fortification was built in 1715 on the ruins of Fort Andross and was known as Fort George. This fort was dismantled in 1736 when the Native American wars were coming to an end.

== Dams ==
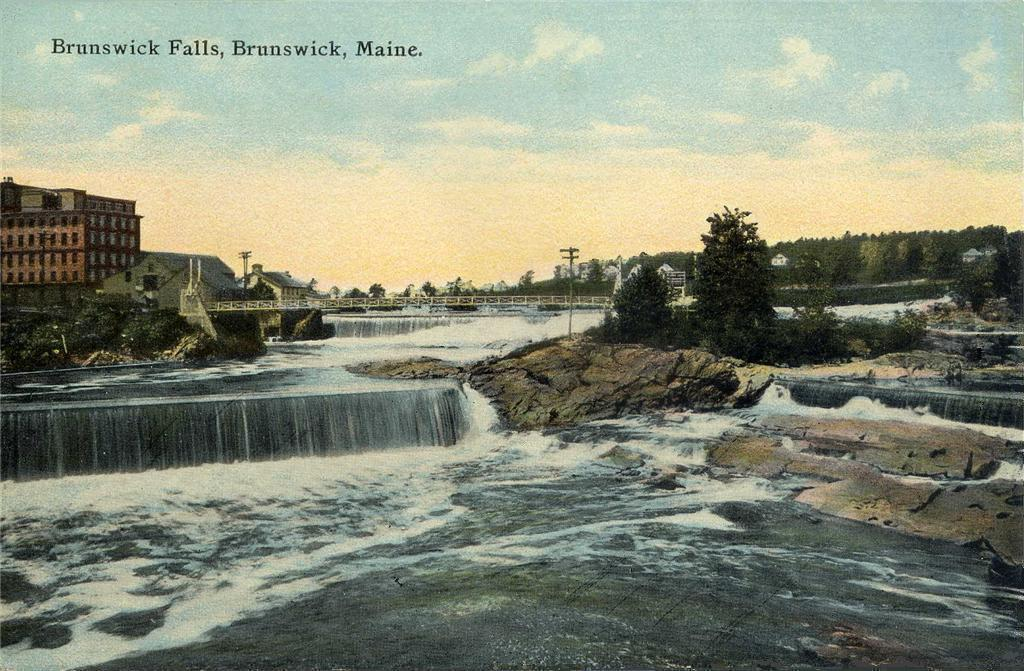
Brunswick Falls (Upper & middle), c. 1912, Cabot Mill on the left

Throughout the 19th century, many dams were built across the Androscoggin River between the towns of Brunswick and Topsham, Maine. The first dam was built in 1753 and, like all subsequent dams of this century, was washed away by freshets.

Colonel Loammi Baldwin, from Boston, made a survey of the water-power of the Androscoggin River in Brunswick. In his report, dated November 12, 1835, Baldwin stated that the Androscoggin River discharges more water than any other river in the state of Maine, being equal, at the lowest stage of the water, to more than 4,000 cubic feet (110 m^{3}) per second. According to this report, all the water at Brunswick Falls was 40.83 feet (12.44 m) high, divided at that time by three dams. At the upper dam there was a fall of 11.30 feet (3.44 m); at the middle dam, 14.04 feet (4.28 m); and at the lower dam, 15.49 feet (4.72 m). From the upper to the lower dam, the distance of the run was 1,280 feet (390 m).

During the Industrial Revolution, there was a multitude of cotton mills that harnessed the water-power of the falls.

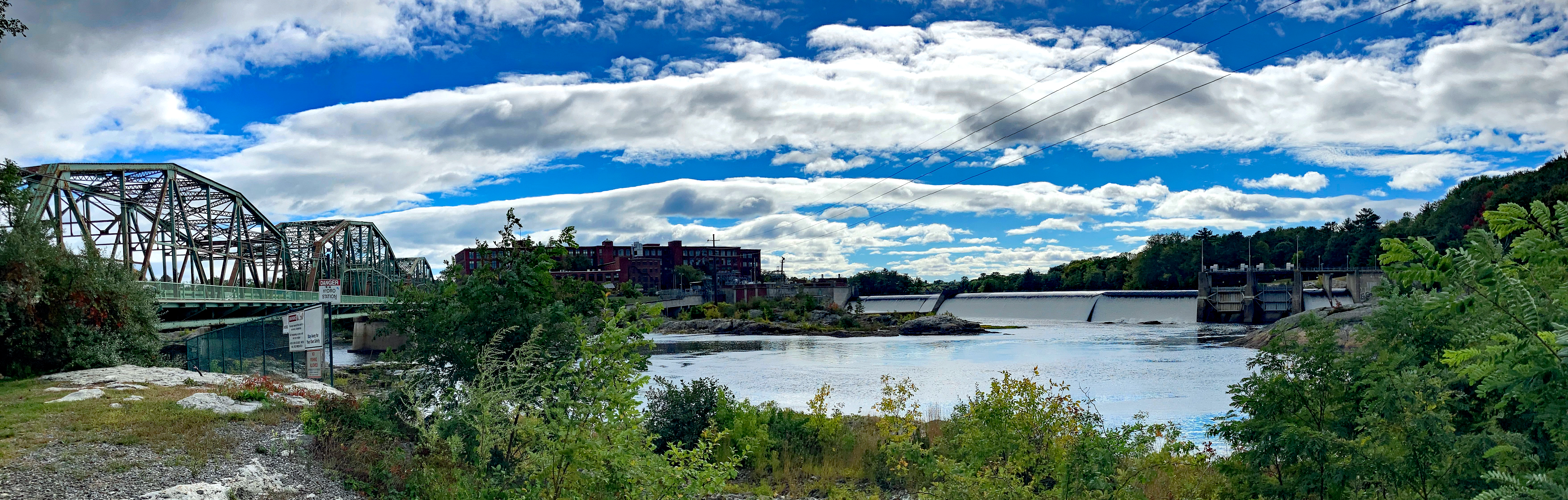
Panoramic image of the falls from the Topsham point of view in 2022. Frank J. Wood Bridge on the left, and Fort Andross in the middle.

== Brunswick Hydroelectric Plant ==
Brunswick Dam
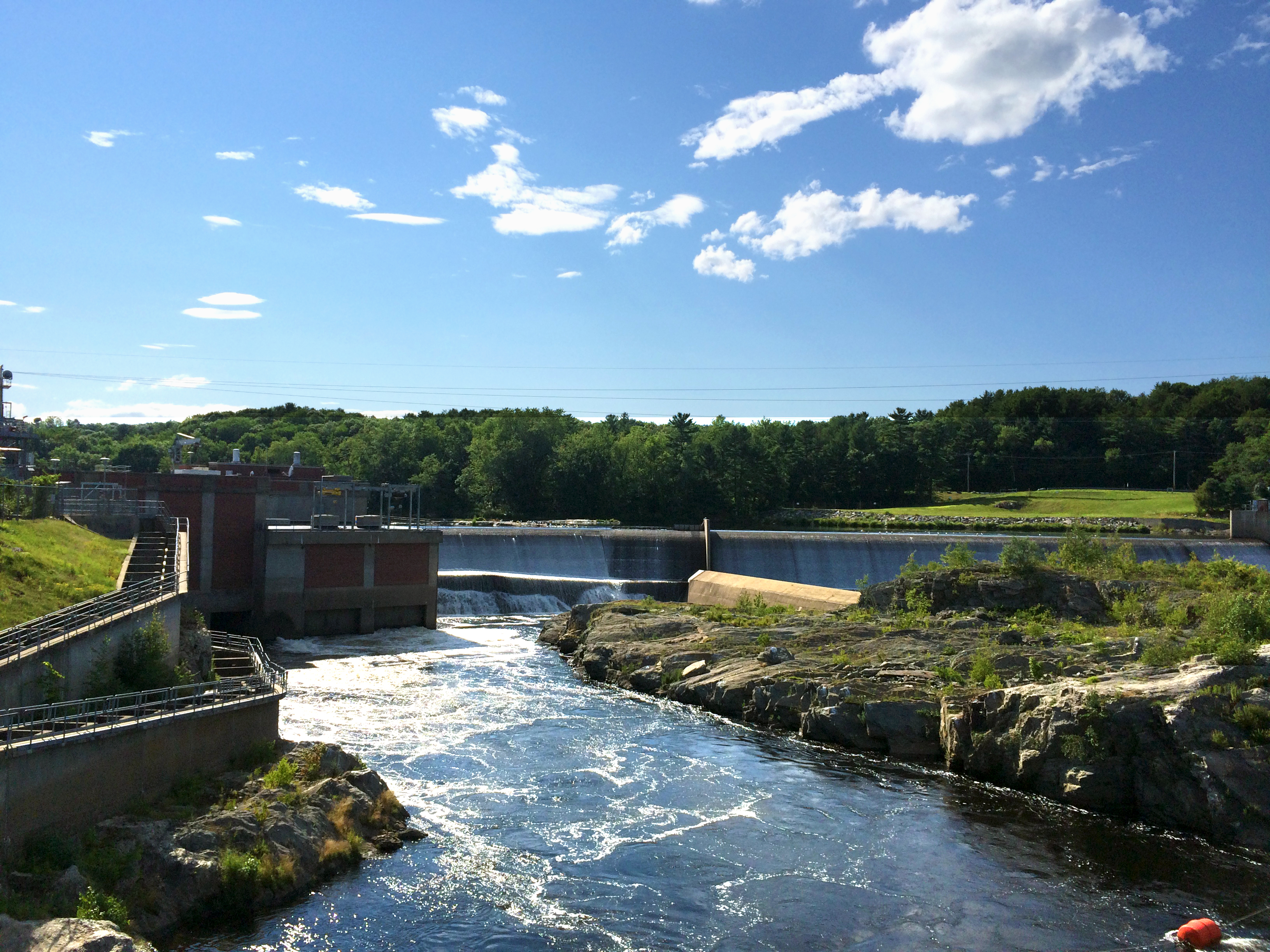
- Brunswick Hydroelectric Station in 2022
- Interactive map of Brunswick Dam
- Coordinates: 43.9214°N 69.9678°W
- Purpose: Flood control and Power
- Status: Operational
- Opening date: 1982

Dam and spillways
- Type of dam: Gravity dam

Brunswick Hydroelectric Station
- Operators: Brookfield Renewable; Central Maine Power
- Type: Conventional
- Turbines: Generator 1: 13 MW; Generator 2: 3.5 MW; Generator 3: 3.5 MW
- Installed capacity: 20 MW
- Website; Brookfield Renewable Energy
- Operator ID: 39006; FERC license number: 2284

Sagadahoc Light and Power Company was the first organization to acquire electric power from Brunswick Falls, with the purpose to generate, sell, and distribute electricity for lighting, heating and manufacturing in the towns of Bath and Brunswick. They were acquired by Bath and Brunswick Light & Power Company in 1910, who in turn, was acquired by Central Maine Power on December 31, 1920.

Between 1979 and 1982 construction occurred for the Brunswick Hydroelectric Station, operated by Brookfield Renewable, sending power to Central Maine Power's electrical grid. The dam became the lower-most dam on the Androscoggin River at head of tide.

Commercial power generation at Unit 1 began in March 1982. In the same year construction began on Units 2 and 3 of the Brunswick hydroelectric station including a fish ladder. It was completed in May 1983.

The station has three generators at work for a total capacity of 20 megawatts. Generator 1, being the largest has a capacity of 13 megawatts and generators 2 and 3 each have a capacity of 3.5 megawatts.

== Fishways ==
Since 1809 when the first cotton mill was erected at the falls, fish have been blocked by dams from the Androscoggin River. Salmon, sturgeon, alewife and shad were very abundant in the Androscoggin, but their number has greatly diminished during modern times.

In 1871, a substantial stone fishway was made at the middle falls. To construct it, the ledge on the northwest end of the dam was cut through. The fishway was on the Topsham side of the dam, at the lower side. The height of the fall at this time was 18 feet (5.5 m). A year later, a wooden fishway was put in on the lower dam next to Shad Island. These were not the first fishways; as early as 1789, the fish wardens were instructed by the town of Topsham to see that the dams were opened so that fish could pass.

While the falls' original dams were made from wood and stone, later dams were constructed using concrete, eliminating the possibility for fish to move upstream. By the 1930s, the Androscoggin's population of sea-run fish was virtually gone, although the Clean Water Act of 1972 helped restore a few species.

In 1982, during the construction of the Brunswick Hydroelectric Dam, a fish ladder, at a cost of US$2 million, was built. It was believed that 85,000 American shad would pass through the ladder each year. However, as reported in 2017, only one per year, were able to swim up the steps of the fish ladder. In 2018 the number of fish who were able to do so increased to 32, and in 2019 it increased to sixty-three. In 2020, the number decreased to twenty-three. Shad, salmon and sturgeon are not regularly able to make it up, but are often beaten or injured along the way.

How many fish have passed through the ladder
Year	Salmon	Shad	Herring
2017	0	1	49,923
2018	1	21	179,040
2019	1	63	81,025
2020	5	23	67
2021	5	550	54,906
2022	17	228	139,326
2023	8	14	67,927

== See also ==
- Pejepscot Historical Society
- History of Maine
- List of waterfalls
