= Skolfield–Whittier House =

Coordinates: 43°54′50″N 69°57′49″W

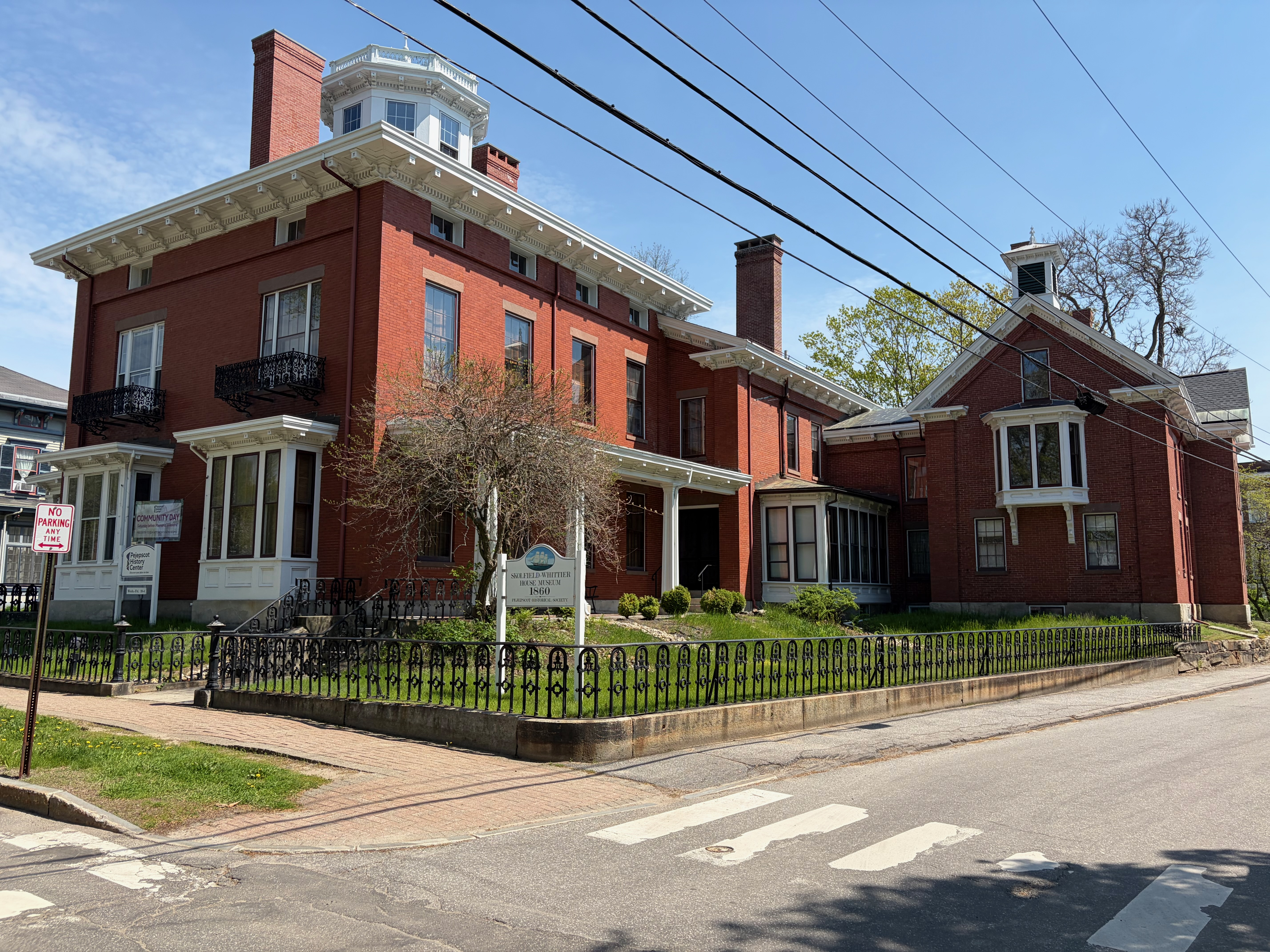
Pictured in 2026

The Skolfield–Whittier House is a Victorian museum of the Pejepscot Historical Society, located at 161 Park Row in Brunswick, Maine. It is often referred to as a "time capsule" because it has been virtually untouched since the Victorian era. It overlooks Lower Mall.

== The Skolfields ==
The Skolfield–Whittier House is one half of an Italiante-style duplex built between 1858 and 1862 for the sons of wealthy shipbuilder Master George Skolfield (1780–1866). Captain Alfred Skolfield (1815–1895) owned the side that is now known as the Skolfield–Whitter House, splitting the construction cost of $15,751.96 with his brother Captain Samuel Skolfield (1826–1916), who owned and lived in the other side of the building (now used as the Pejepscot Historical Society headquarters).

In 1862, Alfred, his wife Martha Harward (1836–1904), and their young daughter Eugenie (1860–1951) moved into their new home. The family furnished the home with expensive furniture from Portland's Walter Corey Company, choosing a Rococo Revival style (much of this furniture remains in the home today). Several of the rooms also feature marble fireplaces with encaustic tile and stylish curtains. At this time the home was most likely lit by gaslight. In 1864 Martha gave birth to a second daughter, Augusta Marie (1864–1902).

=== Move to England ===
In 1867, for reasons that are not entirely clear, Alfred moved his family to Liverpool, England. It may be that political tensions developing during the Reconstruction era were the motivation for the move, as the Skolfields were staunch Democrats living in a region that was primarily Republican. After relocating to England, they did not sell their Brunswick home, choosing instead to rent it out to several different people during their absence. In 1868 Professor J.B. Sewall moved into the home, followed by Stephen O. Purington (1880–1882) and finally Dr. Mitchell (1883–1885), who in 1885 purchased the house next door and became the Skolfields' neighbor.

=== Return to Brunswick and renovation of home ===
In 1885, after living abroad for 18 years, the Skolfields returned to their home and almost immediately began renovations. The plumbing was updated and the former carriage house renovated and attached to the rest of the building. The new space served to house the relocated kitchen, informal dining room, and laundry room. The former kitchen was converted and expanded to become a formal dining room, and the old dining room was renovated into a drawing room.

The influence of English style upon the Skolfields is apparent in the renovations made to the house at this time. The family purchased many new decorations for the home in England, including carpets, a piano, a Chippendale wall bracket and several paintings by J.B. Smith, Spinks, Enser and Woolett. The Skolfields also updated their furniture by purchasing many pieces in the popular Eastlake style. English influence led the Skolfields to separate the bathtub and toilet added to the former carriage house into two separate rooms. In 1891, the home was wired for electricity and circa 1894–1895, the home was connected to the new town sewer lines.

== The Whittiers ==
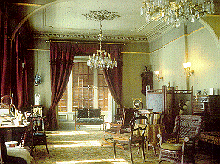
The Skolfield–Whittier House drawing room

Alfred Skolfield died on June 1, 1895, but a new patriarch in the home would soon take his place. On June 24, Eugenie married Frank Whittier (1861–1924) in the drawing room, the most formal room of the house. Frank, a Phi Beta Kappa Bowdoin College graduate from Farmington, Maine, received his medical degree in 1889 and was appointed professor of Pathology and Bacteriology at the Maine Medical School (a now-defunct school of Bowdoin College) in 1891. Frank was Maine's first forensic pathologist, and also took on responsibilities as the first medical examiner for Cumberland County, Brunswick milk inspector, and chairman of the Maine Medical Association's committee on venereal diseases. He appears to have been the first to use a serology test (to distinguish human blood from that of other animals) in a court of law, as well as the first to develop a test for ballistic fingerprinting.

Frank and Eugenie made few changes to the home. Frank added a grandfather clock (believed to have been a Whittier family heirloom) to the entrance hall, and circa 1910–1912 the couple moved their master bedroom to the former carriage house. The former master bedroom was converted into the current library. By 1913, a telephone had been installed in the home.

Eugenie and Frank had three daughters: Isabel (1896–1976), Alice (1898–1994) and Charlotte (1903–1912). Charlotte died at the age of 9 after accidentally catching on fire in the family kitchen. Isabel and Alice both attended Bryn Mawr College, graduating in 1920 and 1921, respectively. Isabel became a teacher at Brooklyn College, where she taught for more than 30 years, and was a close friend of Margaret Chase Smith (there are many pictures of Smith scattered about the home). Meanwhile, Alice followed in her father's footsteps, setting up a practice in Portland to become Maine's first female pediatrician.

After Frank's death in 1924, Eugenie took up a life of travel, and she and her daughters usually spent only summers at their Brunswick home. In 1982, Alice, the last living member of the family, donated the entire home and its contents to the Pejepscot Historical Society. The museum is open for guided tours during the summer season.
