= Fort Andross =

Site of colonial forts and cotton mills

- Part of Dominion of New England
- Brunswick, Maine
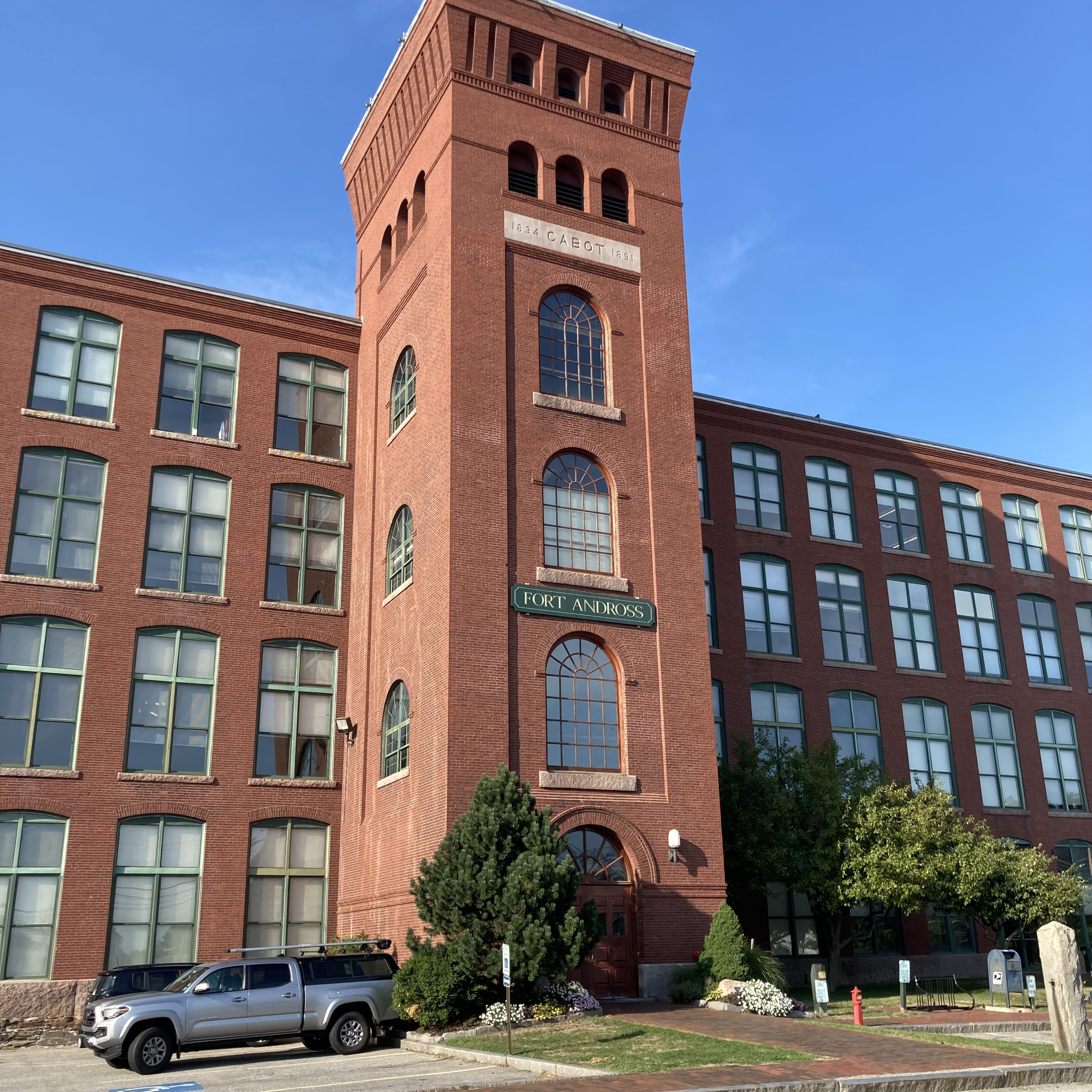
- Mill Complex on the site of Fort Andross c. 2022 reading "1834 CABOT 1891". 1834 being the year the building was first erected by The Brunswick Company, and 1891 the year the expansion "wings" were added by The Cabot Manufacturing Company.

Site information
- Type: Fortification
- Controlled by: Dominion of New England

Location
- Coordinates: 43°55′09″N 69°58′01″W

Site history
- Built: 1688
- Materials: Wood and stone
- Fate: Demolished, non-existent
- Demolished: 1694
- Battles/wars: King William's War
- Events: Rebuilt and renamed as Fort George

Garrison information
- Past commanders: Lieutenant Colonel McGregory; Major Thomas Savage

Fort Andross, also known as Fort George and Cabot Mill, was initially established as a trading post and later converted into a historic garrison by the colonial Province of Massachusetts Bay as a defensive measure against the Wabanaki Native Americans who were allied with France during King William's War (1688–1697). It was situated next to Brunswick Falls, on the Androscoggin River in Brunswick, Maine. During the war, the fortification was destroyed, rebuilt, and renamed Fort George in 1715. Once the Native American wars came to an end, the fort was abandoned.

In the 19th century, the site of the fort was repurposed as a location for several cotton mills, including the Cabot Manufacturing Company, and in the 20th century several industrial buildings occupied the locale. In 1986, the mills were revitalized and transformed into office and retail spaces and renamed back to Fort Andross to reflect the original name.

== Trading post and forts ==
=== Trading post ===
In the year 1620, a charter was granted by King James I of England to forty noblemen, knights, and gentlemen, calling themselves the Plymouth Company. Their territory extended from the fourteenth to the forty-eighth parallel of latitude, and from sea to sea. The council, on June 16, 1632, granted a patent to Thomas Purchase and his brother-in-law George Way. Purchase had settled in the area, four years prior, in 1628, setting up a trading post to buy and sell goods, mainly salmon, sturgeon and furs along the Androscoggin River. The site was adjacent to a 41 foot (12 metres) waterfall known then as Pejepscot Falls, in what is now Brunswick, Maine. The Wabanaki Native Americans referred to this area of Brunswick, Topsham and Harpswell Maine as Pejepscot which translates to "long, rocky rapids part".

In 1675, the settlements in Pejepscot were burned by the French and their native allies during King Philip's War and Purchase fled to Boston.

=== Fort Andross ===
In 1688, Fort Andross was the first fortification on the banks of the Androscoggin River and controlled by the British Empire.

After King Philip's War and during King William's War, Governor Edmund Andros of the Dominion of New England, who desired the promotion of eastern settlements, came to Pejepscot in the midwinter of 1688. Andros with an army of 1,000 men, built a new fort on the occasion that the Wabanaki Native Americans would attack the area, as it was a highly sought after location for fishing and hunting. The location of the fort is in the same location as the preceding trading post owned by Thomas Purchase. Fort Andross was under the command of Lieutenant Colonel McGregory and Major Thomas Savage; it was destroyed during King William's War by the French and their Wabanaki allies in 1694.

Although Fort Andross was named after Governor Edmund Andros, it is not known as to why the spelling changed, adding an extra "S" at the end. In 1878, the Wheeler brothers wrote a book titled The History of Brunswick, Topsham, and Harpswell, Maine. This book is, what the Pejepscot Historical Society states as, "the authoritative text on the three towns through 1878." There are several notations of the fort where it is spelled both with one "S", and with two.

=== Fort George ===
Fort George
- Part of United Kingdom
- Brunswick, Maine
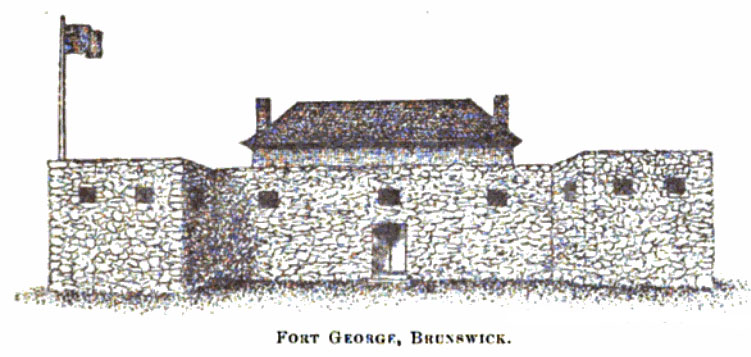
- Artist rendition of Fort George, drawn from memory by Danielle Stone Sr. c. 1715

Site information
- Type: Fortification
- Controlled by: British Empire

Location
- Coordinates: 43.919392°N 69.9692445°W
- Height: 10 feet (3.0 m)

Site history
- In use: 1715-1736
- Materials: Lime mortar
- Fate: Abandoned, not standing

Garrison information
- Past commanders: Captain John Gyles; Benjamin Larrabee; Captain William Woodside

After Queen Anne's War, a new fort was built in 1715 by Captain John Gyles on the ruins of Fort Andross. This fort was named Fort George, named after King George I of Great Britain. The fort was 3 feet (0.91 m) underground with a 3-foot-thick (0.91 m) wall base, standing 10 feet (3.0 m) high above ground, laid with lime mortar. The barracks housed fifteen men. A large two story dwelling house, appearing above the walls and a cannon protecting the local settlers.

During the span of Fort George (1715–1736), many local proprietors of the lands in Brunswick and Topsham volunteered as soldiers to garrison the Fort.

During the many Native American wars that were fought in the area, the inhabitants of Brunswick and Topsham gathered within the walls of the fort whenever they felt unsafe. But there were also times when trade ran fluidly with the natives.

As the series of wars were beginning to end in the region, the government of Massachusetts deemed it unnecessary to retain the fort any longer, even though earlier in the year, Adam Hunter, of Topsham Maine, received a commission as Captain, with the authority to raise an independent company.

In 1736, the General Court of Massachusetts decided to dismantle Fort George. A petition was sent to the legislature, by the inhabitants of Brunswick and Topsham, asking for the fort to remain. The petition was denied. The property was reverted to the proprietors who leased it, together with all the buildings and land connected with it, to George Harwood. He occupied the premises until November 1, 1761.

At a meeting of the Pejepscot Proprietors, held in 1761, Belcher Noyes (Municipal clerk) was instructed to execute a deed of the old fort, with the buildings and land belonging to it, and the privilege of the stream at the falls, half to Jeremiah Moulton, Esquire, the other half to Captain David Dunning, for the sum of one hundred thirty three pounds six shillings and eight pence. Noyes gave Harwood a written order to surrender the fort and buildings to either Moulton or Dunning.

The ruins of the fort, with some portions of the wall yet standing, were seen as late as 1802. The materials of the old fort were used in the construction of dwellings in Brunswick and Topsham. Some of the lime mortar from the fort was used for the foundations of these buildings.

=== Memorials ===
==== 1810 ====
To mark the location of both forts, in 1810, three surveyors from the town of Brunswick, John Abbot, John Perry Jr. and Jacob Abbot, while surveying Maine Street, drilled a hole into a rock in the ground and drove an iron bolt 1.25 inches (32 mm) in diameter and 18 inches (460 mm) in length. Technically not a memorial, as it was used for surveying purposes, the iron bolt was removed during the Cabot Manufacturing Company expansion of 1891.

==== 1930 ====
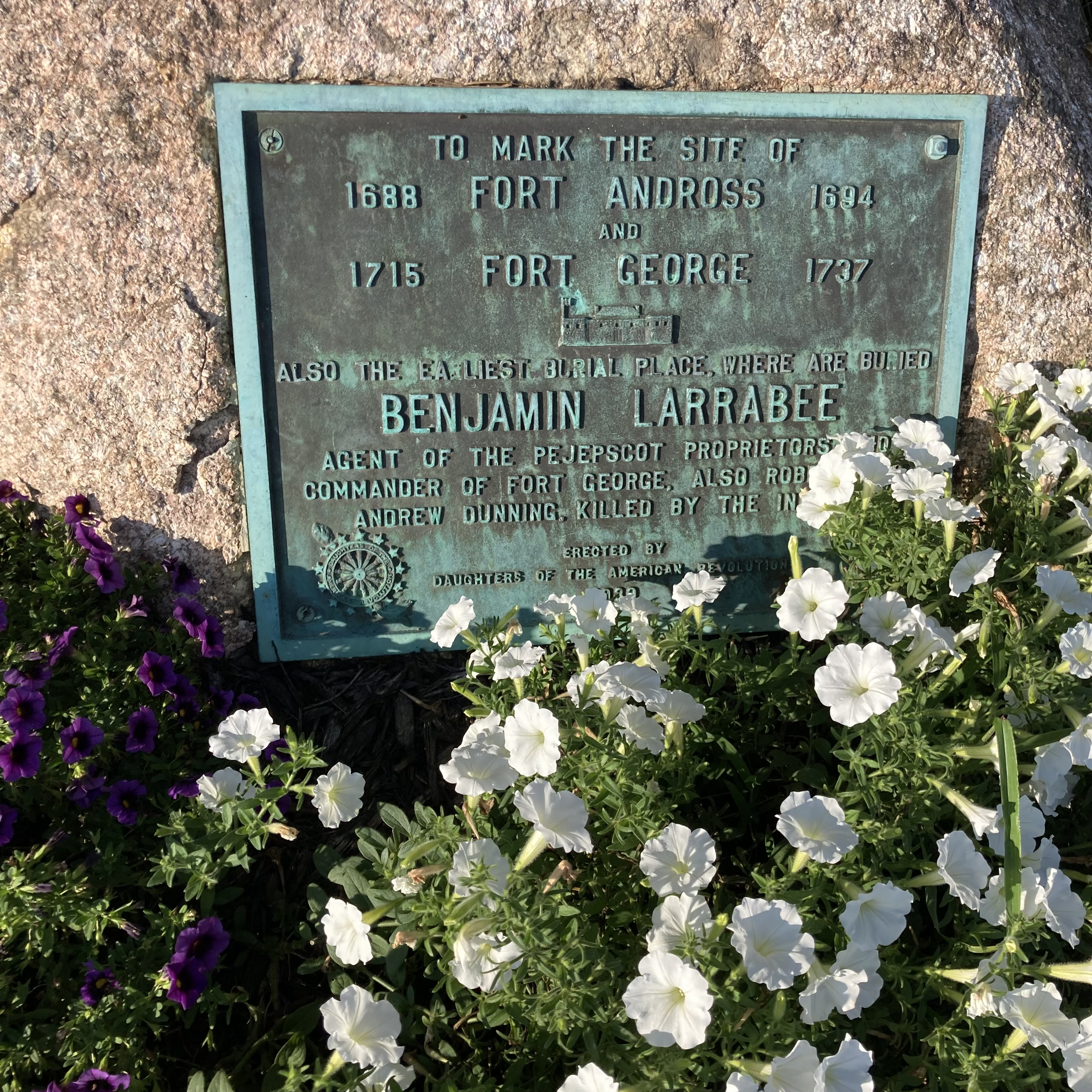
Fort Andross marker

Adjoining the stone fort built by Governor Andros in 1689, a cemetery was used until the town was incorporated in 1739. There were headstones marking the burial place of Benjamin Larrabee, agent of the Pejepscot proprietors, one of the commanders of Fort George, and the ancestor of the Larrabees living in this vicinity. There were also the gravestones of Robert and Andrew Dunning, who were killed by Native Americans at Mason's rock in Brunswick. The site of this cemetery was covered with mill buildings in the early 1800s.

In 1930, the Daughters of the American Revolution, a nonprofit organization that promotes education and patriotism, erected a monument in honor of Fort Andross and Fort George, as well as respecting the place of burial of Larrabee and the Dunnings.

To mark the site of Fort Andross (1688–1694) and Fort George (1715–1737). Also the earliest burial place, where are buried Benjamin Larrabee, agent of the Pejepscot Proprietors and Commander of Fort George also Robert and Andrew Dunning killed by the indians.

— Daughters of the American Revolution, 1930

== Mill factories ==
After Fort George was abandoned in 1736, seventy-three years passed before the site was once again occupied. There were several mills built on the site from 1809 to the 1950s, manufacturing cotton and wool products.

Mill factories on the site of Fort Andross
Mill	Start Date	End Date	Years Active
Brunswick Cotton Manufacturing Company	1809	1812	3
Maine Cotton and Woolen Factory Company	1812	1825	13
Eagle Factory	1825	1834	9
The Brunswick Company	1834	1843	9
Whitwell, Seaver, & Co.	1843	1847	4
Warumbo Manufacturing Company	1847	1853	6
The Cabot Company	1853	1857	4
The Cabot Manufacturing Company	1857	1942	85
Verney Brunswick Mills Inc.	1942	1955	13

=== Brunswick Cotton Manufacturing Company ===
The first factory built on the site of Fort Andross was established by the Brunswick Cotton Manufacturing Company, harnessing power from the Androscoggin River at Brunswick Falls. This was the first cotton mill to be built in Maine and only the sixth in the USA. The company was incorporated March 4, 1809. Ezra Smith, Governor William King (1820–1821), and Doctor Porter were among the proprietors. The company was formed for the manufacture of cotton yarn, which was shipped to other mills to be made into cloth. The mill did not prove a success, and the shareholders lost all their capital. The mill was a three-story, gambrel roofed, wooden building, and stood next to Brunswick Falls on the ruins of Fort Andross and Fort George.

=== Maine Cotton and Woolen Factory Company ===
The second mill was that of the Maine Cotton and Woolen Factory Company, which was incorporated in October 1812. The mill was made from wood and Deacon John Perry was the first agent.

In 1820 there were 1,248 cotton spindles in full operation, and 240 woollen spindles, nine woollen looms, nine carding machines and nine fulling machines. 100,000 yards (91,000 m) of cotton cloth were made per season. About one hundred people were employed at that time but the mill was destroyed by a fire in 1825.

Soon after the fire, a mill for carding wool and dressing cloth was established by John Dyer. It was called the Eagle Factory and it stood at the end of the previous mill. It was removed in 1834.

=== The Brunswick Company ===
In 1834, The Brunswick Company was incorporated and bought the land. Among the corporators was the 11th governor of Maine, Governor Robert P Dunlap (1843–1847) as well as members of the Dunning and McKean families. The new mill consisted of granite, four stories high, 146 feet (45 m) long, capable of containing 5,120 spindles of cotton.

In total, aside from the Fort Andross site, the company had four additional mills of equal size, two dwelling houses, three stories high, one store, a counting room, stone picker-house, cotton store, and a forging-shop, all completely finished, with all but four situated in Brunswick. They also occupied the whole breadth of the Androscoggin River with islands and dams, thirteen and a half acres of land in Brunswick and Topsham, and Hydropower sufficient to have as many saws and spindles of cotton machinery as there was space.

The Brunswick Company ran this factory until 1840, when they leased it to Mr. Allen Colby, who managed it until March 1843, when it was sold at auction in Boston, Massachusetts to Whitwell, Seaver, & Co., for $34,400. The original cost was about $190,000. Whitwell, Seaver, & Co. entrusted the management of it to Messrs A.P. Kimball and John Dunning Coburn, of Boston, who soon afterwards purchased it. The company, after carrying on with business for a few years, failed.

On July 3, 1847, the Warumbo Manufacturing Company (not to be confused with Worumbo Mill in Lisbon Falls, Maine) was incorporated and the stock of the Brunswick Company, consisting of mortgages from the previous owners, was bought for $40,000. The company was organized in the summer of 1848, but a few years later, it also failed.

=== Cabot Manufacturing Company ===
Cabot Mill (1857–1941)
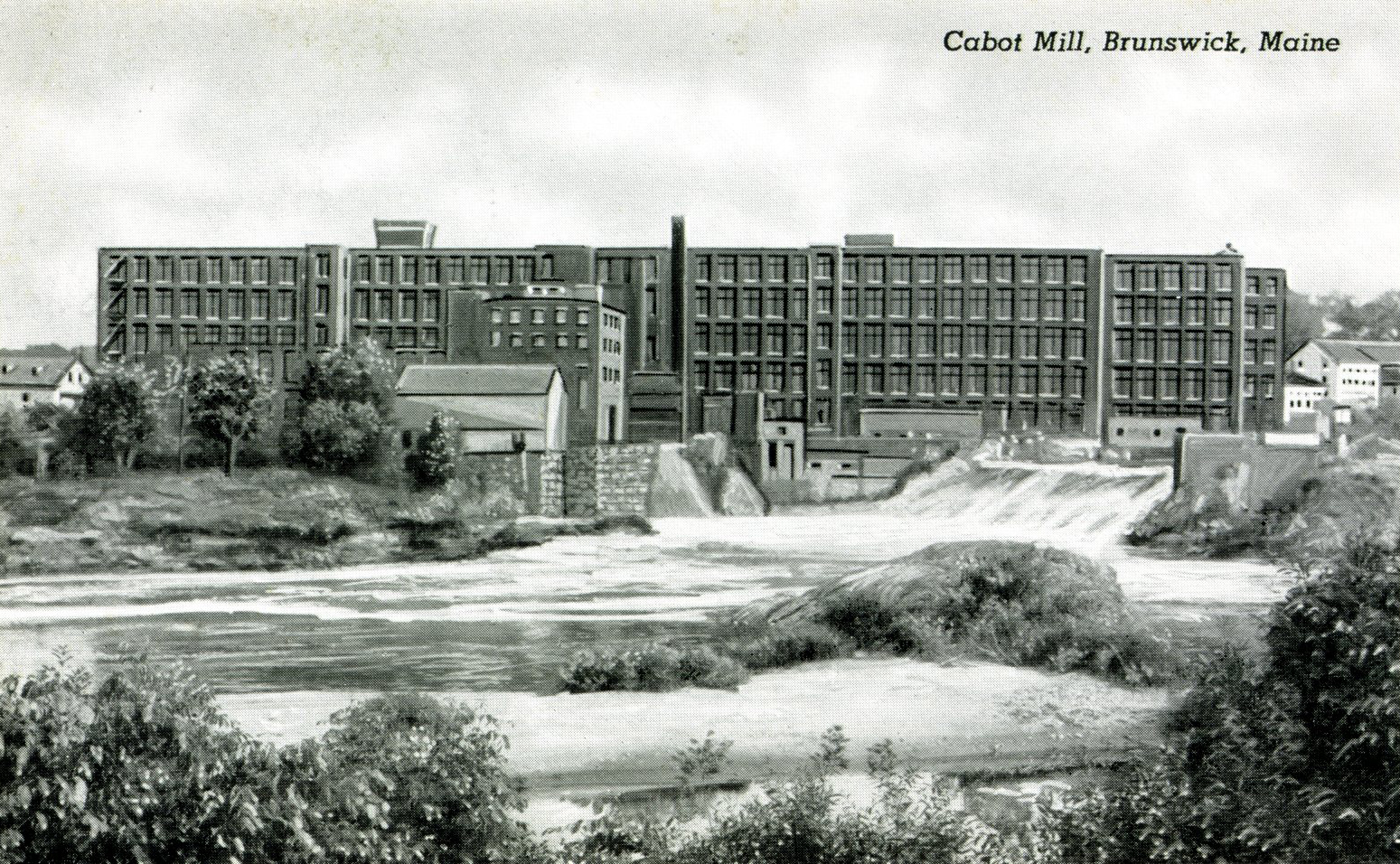
- Cabot Mill

Cotton and rayon
- Alternative names: Fort Andross Mill Complex
- Spindles: 65,000 (1891)
- Current status: Standing, usage changed
- Structural system: Engineering brick
- Location: Brunswick, Maine
- Owner: Cabot Manufacturing Company (1857-1941)
- Current owners: Waterfront Maine (1986)

Construction
- Floor count: 4
- Floor area: 45,000 square foot (4,200 m^{2})

Equipment
- Mule Frames: 65,000 (1891)

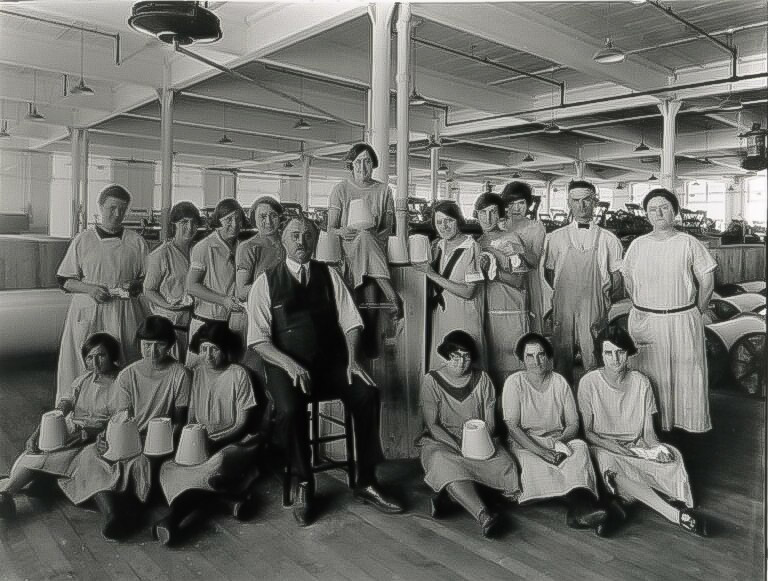
Cabot Mill 1920 winding room

In 1853 the Cabot Company, of the Cabot family from Boston, Massachusetts, bought the factory. Due to a large amount of debt and a number of the shareholders failing to pay their assessments, it was sold at auction in 1857. A number of the former owners bought up the stock and re-organized under the name of The Cabot Manufacturing Company (also known as Cabot Mill), with a capital of $400,000.

In 1857 the company had 235 looms. There were 9,000 spindles at work; the mill gave employment to 175 employees, and turned out 50,000 yards of cotton per week.

In 1865 an addition to the building of 70 feet (21 m) was made on the east side and 50 feet (15 m) on the west side, making two wings on the ends. In 1867 the mill had 26,000 spindles. The company owned thirty acres of land on the two sides of the river and seventy-five tenements, and made its own gas, which it also supplied to the town. In 1877 the capital stock was $600,000; the number of spindles, 35,000; the number of employees was five hundred and fifty. The buildings of the company were a factory, office, storehouse, store, and one hundred tenements.

In 1891 the Cabot Manufacturing company asked, and was granted access to the town owned lot within feet (meters) of their mill for the purpose of expansion. This small lot is where the memorial of the old Fort George stood. The addition was 196 feet (60 m) long and 118.5 feet (36.1 m) wide and four stories high, putting the capacity of spindles up to 65,000 with 900 employees.

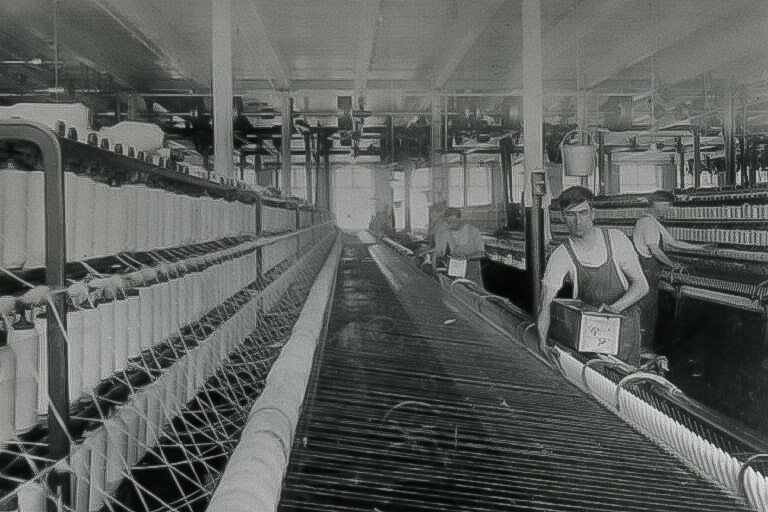
Cabot Mill 1920 winding room

After the American Civil War ended in 1865, Brunswick saw an influx of French Canadians looking for work. In response to this demand, the Cabot mill built tenement housing for the new force of Franco-American workers. These tenements were located on Mill Street within walking distance of the mill.

The factory used child labour: the smallest children removed the spools filled by the spinning machine and replaced them with empty ones. On August 12, 1881, Franco-American children as young as seven years old went on strike and the mill had to shut down for three days. The striking children were offered one penny more an hour, the same pay as the nearby Bates Mill, in the neighboring town of Lewiston. A few days later, the adults, knowing of the success of their children, banded together and went on strike as well. A few days after the strike began, Benjamin Greene, the face of the Cabot Manufacturing Company in town, gave a 30-days notice to vacate to the residents in the company-owned tenements.

In 1885, when a diphtheria epidemic raced through the Brunswick's Franco-American population, the state of Maine ordered the Cabot Manufacturing Company to clean up the tenements it had neglected.

In 1942 the Cabot Manufacturing Company sold the factory to the Verney Corporation who called the mill Verney Brunswick Mills. This would be the last mill to occupy the site first built in 1809. The Verney Brunswick Mill was used for cotton, rayon and shoe manufacturing and concluded operations in 1955.

== Industrial buildings ==
=== Lewis Industrial Building ===
In 1955 the Gera Corporation bought the mill from the Verney Corporation but quickly sold it to George Lewis, a Portland realty developer and food wholesaler who bought the old mill at a cost of $500,000 and named it the Lewis Industrial Building.

Among the tenants of the Lewis Industrial Building was the Auerbach Shoe Company. In 1968, Auerbach Shoe was ranked tenth for footwear manufacturers in all of New England selling women's and children's boots.

During the 1970s gas crisis, Auerbach Shoe was experiencing a shortage of vinyl, a petroleum derivative. In 1974 Auerbach went through a "slack period", which was supposed to be temporary, but the plant never reopened. The following year a lawsuit was filed on behalf of the employees who lost their pensions.

It was standard practice for small independent shoe manufacturers to close over the December holidays. A full two and one-half months after the time when annual operations were normally resumed, management still publicly claimed that the layoff was merely seasonal. They closed in December 1973 and never resumed operations.

=== Fort Andross ===
In the 1980s the old mill was briefly used for storage by Bath Iron Works, but the building was in disrepair.

In 1986 Coleman P. Burke of New York City, founder and managing partner of Waterfront Maine (North River Company), purchased the land and mill building at auction. Due to the non-use of the 45,000 square foot (4,200 m^{2}) structure, 857 windows had to be replaced before it could be rented for retail and office space.

Coming full circle, the name of the building was changed to Fort Andross, reflecting the original fort that occupied the site in 1688.

==== Archaeological dig ====
In 2018, an archaeological excavation found pottery from the 1800s in the parking lot of Fort Andross. Representatives from Maine Preservation also discovered a 3-foot wall dating to the same era.

==== Mural ====
In August 2023 a mural was completed on the south side of the building facing U.S. Route 1. The painting is 40 feet (12 m) tall and 35 feet (11 m) wide and is named Many Stitches Hold Up the Sky. It took ten years to acquire the $75,000 from donations to the organization Brunswick Public Art and was painted by artists Jen Greta Cart and Chris Cart of Hallowell, Maine. The mural is a contemporary depiction of eight culturally significant peoples that have inhabited the area.

== See also ==
- Pejepscot Historical Society

== Notes ==
a. On the inside front cover of the 2nd ed. (1974), via Curtis Memorial Library (Brunswick, Maine), the Pejepscot Historical Society states "The History of Brunswick, Topsham, and Harpswell, Maine has long been considered the authoritative text on the three towns through 1878."
b. This article incorporates text from this source, which is in the public domain.
