= René Seyssaud =

French painter (1867–1952)

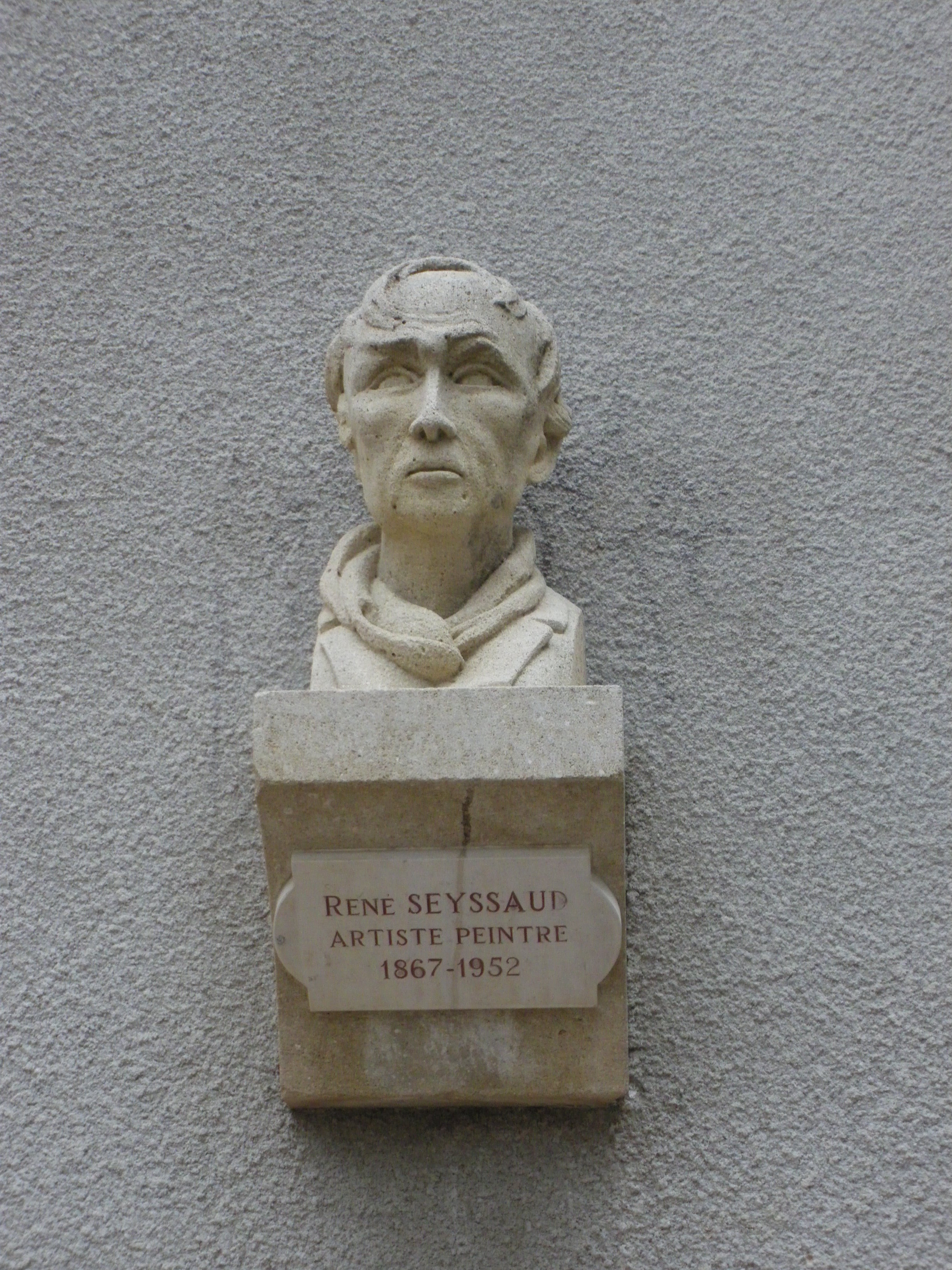
- Bust of Seyssaud in Villes-sur-Auzon
- Born: Auguste René Seyssaud; 16 June 1867; Marseille, Bouches-du-Rhône, French Empire
- Died: 26 September 1952 (aged 85); Saint-Chamas, Bouches-du-Rhône, French Republic
- Occupation: Painter

Auguste René Seyssaud (French pronunciation: [ʁəne sɛso]; 16 June 1867 – 26 September 1952) was a French Provençal painter and is known as a precursor of Fauvism.

== Biography ==
Seyssaud was born on 16 June 1867 in Marseille, but spent his childhood at his ancestral home of Pezet house (Villes-sur-Auzon). He came from a Vaucluse family, his father (Siffrein Seyssaud) being a lawyer. As he showed aptitude for painting from a young age, he was first enrolled at the École des beaux-arts de Marseille (1879–1883) and after the death of his father in 1885, he joined the École des beaux-arts d'Avignon, where his master was Pierre Grivolas.

Noted for his powerful temperament and his bold, brightly coloured palette, Seyssaud together with Louis Valtat has been described as a precursor of Fauvism. His first major exhibition was at the Salon des Indépendants in Paris in 1892. He then opened the Salon d'Automne and the Salon des Tuileries.

His marriage on 11 January 1899 to Louise Philibert gave him the opportunity to settle in Villes-sur-Auzon, where he chose Mont Ventoux and the gorges of the Nesque as his pictorial themes. On 27 April 1901, François Thiébault-Sisson wrote in Le Temps about Seyssaud:

We should give first place here to someone who is like no one else, who is part of no group and who owes nothing to anyone except himself. Seyssaud, this solitary, unsociable man from Provence, has made himself, a long way from Paris, into a master.

— François Thiébault-Sisson

Suffering from tuberculosis, his doctors advised Seyssaud to move closer to the sea and in 1904 he moved to Saint-Chamas, where his studio overlooked the Étang de Berre. He lived there until his death. Still, Seyssaud often came back to the foot of the Ventoux and in the mid-1930s, he set up a studio in Aurel. His cousins Jean, the twins Paul and Philippe, came there to meet him and, following his example, took up painting and made a name for themselves.

Seyssaud died in Saint-Chamas on 26 September 1952. His features are preserved in the portrait painted by Pierre Ambrogiani and kept by the Musée municipal Paul Lafran in Saint-Chamas. A 1950 photograph of him by Norman Parkinson is part of the National Portrait Gallery, London.

== Work ==
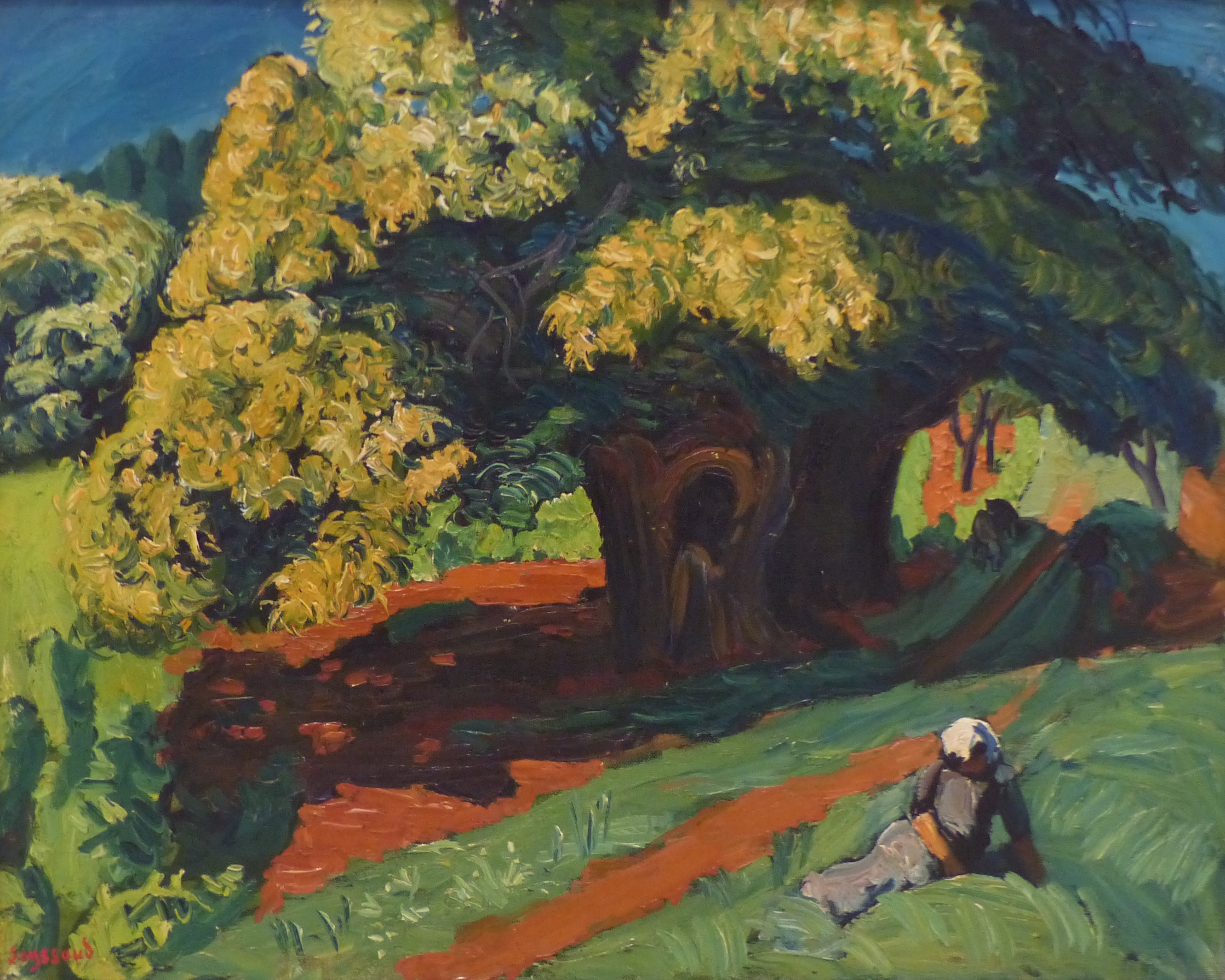
Châtaigniers en fleurs in the Clavet Museum

Seyssaud is best known for his still lifes, his landscapes and the display of peasant life. His work was especially inspired by the Provençal landscape. In the Provence, the village of Villes-sur-Auzon, a Vaucluse village, and Saint-Chamas, near the Etang de Berre, were his main sources of inspiration.

- Musée d'Orsay
  - Les Oliviers, oil on canvas, 100.0 × 81.3 cm, 1898
- Musée des Beaux-Arts de Dijon:
  - Portrait d'enfant, oil on canvas, 45 × 36,5 cm, 1890.
  - Raisins et figues, oil on canvas, vers 1909.
- Musée des Beaux-Arts de Marseille
  - Coings et pot bleu, oil on canvas, 38 × 46 cm, vers 1908.
- Musée d'Art de Toulon
  - Paysans au travail, oil on canvas, 81 × 59 cm, non datée
  - L’Etang de Berre
- Hermitage Museum, Saint Petersburg
  - La Route, oil on canvas, 32 × 49,3 cm, 1901

== Recognition ==
- 1946: Officer of the Legion of Honour
- 1952: Grand Prix d'Honneur des Provinces Francaises at the Menton Biennale

A street in Marseille, the Rue René Seyssaud, and a municipal library in Villes-sur-Auzon (the Bibliothèque René Seyssaud) bear his name.

== Exhibitions ==
- Musée des Beaux-Arts La Cohue de Vannes ("Seyssaud: D’une lumière à l’autre"): 30 April 2022 – 2 October 2022
- Musée des beaux Arts de Nîmes ("René Seyssaud, la couleur exaltée"): 15 July 2020 – 17 January 2021
- Palais des Arts (Marseille) ("René Seyssaud – L’ivresse de la couleur"): 14 July 2012 – 18 November 2012
- Musée de Région Auguste Chabaud, Graveson: 14 April 2012 – 1 July 2012
- Chapelle Saint-Pierre, Saint Chamas ("Nature et Volupté"): 7 June 2008 – 29 July 2008
- Musée Ziem, Martigues ("Sensations de mer"): 5 November 2003 – 28 January 2004
