= Cettin =

5th-century Celtic Catholic saint

Saint Cettin of Oran

Bishop
- Died: 5th century Oran
- Venerated in: Catholic Church
- Canonized: Pre-Congregation
- Major shrine: County Roscommon, Oran
- Feast: 16 June

Cettin also known as Saint Cettin of Oran or Cethach, Cetagh and Cethagh was a disciple of Saint Patrick. He helped St. Patrick in evangelizing in Ireland. St. Patrick consecrated him as an auxiliary bishop of Oran. He is believed to have died in 5th century. His feast day is 16 June. His shrine at Oran, County Roscommon was a well-known place of pilgrimage, and survived until the end of the eighteenth century.

== In popular culture ==
Saint Cettin is referred to by the character Patrick "Kitten" Braden in the novel Breakfast on Pluto by Irish novelist Patrick McCabe as well as its film adaptation.
