= Pejepscot Historical Society =

Coordinates: 43°54′51″N 69°57′50″W

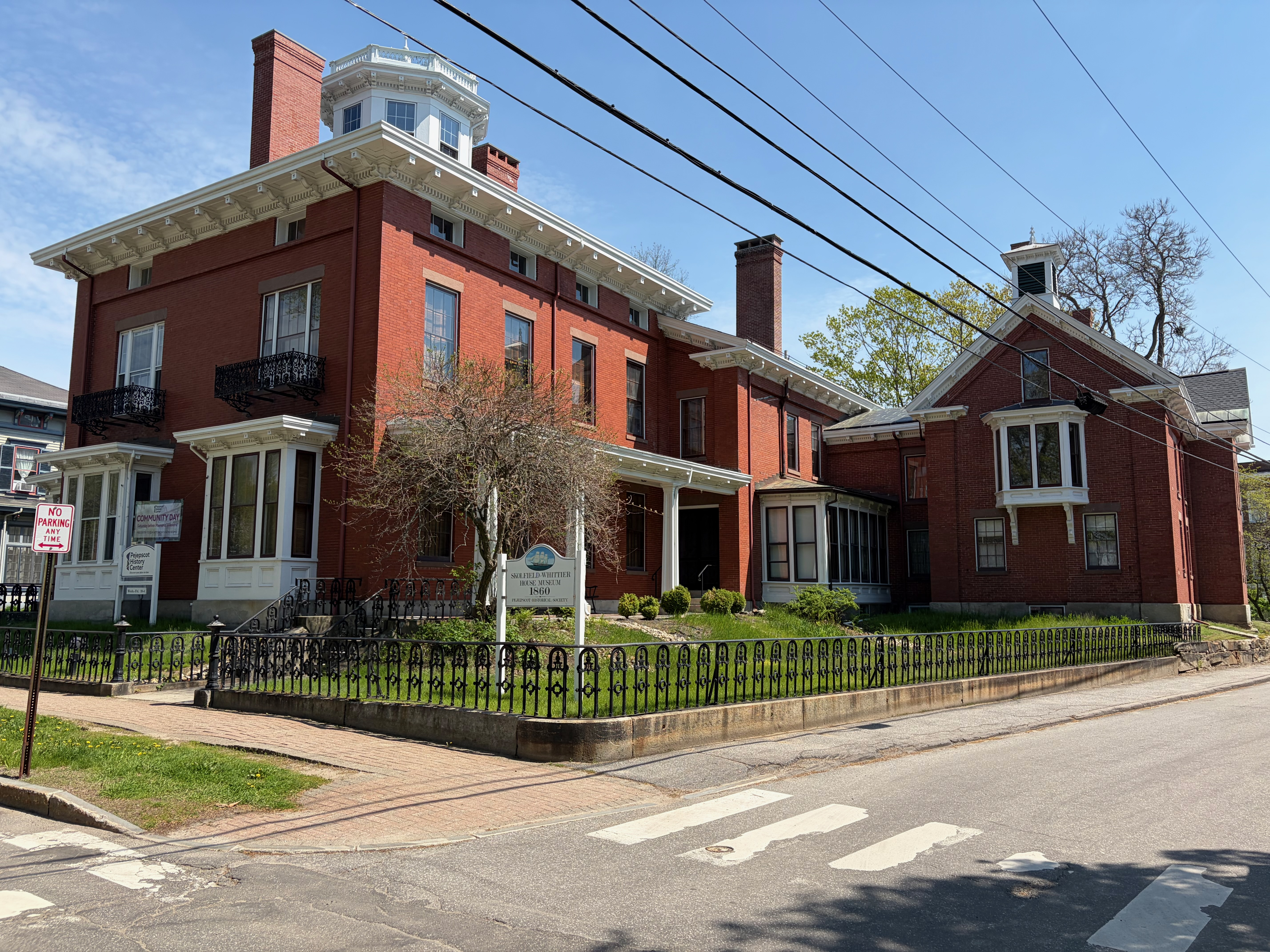
The society is headquartered on the left side of an Italianate duplex. The right side houses the Skolfield-Whittier House, a society museum.

The Pejepscot Historical Society, known as the Pejepscot History Center, is the fourth-oldest historical society in the state of Maine. Founded in 1888, the society's mission is to preserve and celebrate the history of the Pejepscot region, which includes the towns of Brunswick, Harpswell and Topsham.

== History of the society ==
=== Beginnings ===
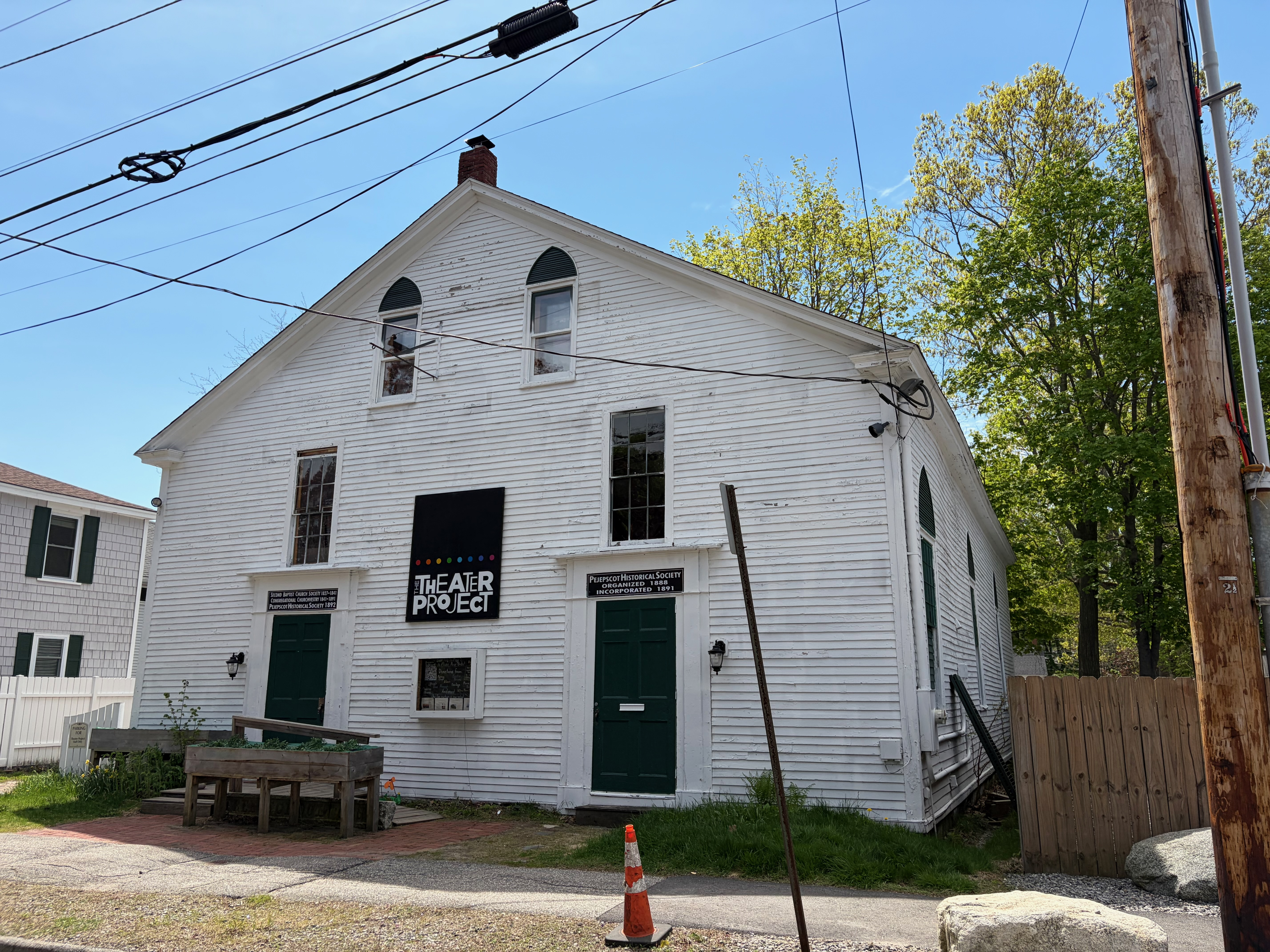
The society has used the former First Congregational Church building, located on School Street and completed in 1827, since 1892.

The society was founded by 16 local citizens who officially met for the first time on January 10, 1888, at the Brunswick Selectmen's Room in the Odd Fellows building. At the time, the town of Brunswick was recognized as the largest and wealthiest in the state and was nearing its 150th anniversary. Brunswick's rapid industrialization "inspired many to look back at the lifestyles, traditions, and history of the area soon to be lost".

At this first meeting the group adopted a set of by-laws, elected officers, approved a regular meeting schedule and established membership dues at $1. The group's first order of business was to plan Brunswick's 150th anniversary celebration, scheduled for June 13, 1889. Originally referred to as "Local Historical Society", by the time of its legal incorporation in December 1891 the group had chosen the name "Pejepscot Historical Society" to reflect the history of not just the town of Brunswick but of the region.

By 1889 the society had amassed a collection of approximately 500 artifacts. In 1891 charter member John Furbish purchased the 1827 First Congregational Church building on School Street (later known as the Varney Lecture Hall) in Brunswick for the society's use at the price of $1,000. The organization then worked to raise the $1000 (as well as an additional $500 for repairs) needed to buy the building from Furbish. By the end of 1892 the society had its first home, and on May 3, 1893, the first artifacts were moved into the School Street building.

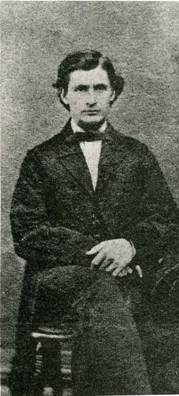
Furbish in his 1863 wedding photo

=== Decline and rejuvenation ===
From 1908 to 1922 only one society meeting was held, due in part to the deaths of a large portion of the group's members and founders. Following this lengthy period of inactivity, in May 1923 a meeting was held to reorganize the historical society. The success of a lecture series, which brought prominent speakers to the town, helped revitalize the society and in 1939 the group played a role in Brunswick's bicentennial celebration.

Issues with the Varney Lecture Hall pushed the organization to search for a new, larger, heated space beginning in 1955. In 1974 the society purchased a large Italiante brick building at 11 Lincoln Street known as the McManus-Richardson House and began moving their collection (now numbering over 1,500 artifacts) into the building.

=== Establishment of museums ===
In March 1982, Alice Skolfield Whittier offered her half of a Park Row duplex and its contents to the organization as what was called by then-president F. Burton Whitman "the biggest and best gift ever made to our Society". The building, known as the Skolfield-Whittier House, serves as a time capsule of Victorian life. Not long after this, the owners of the building adjoining the Skolfield-Whittier House sold their property to the society so that the organization might be headquartered near its first separate museum. To help fund this purchase, the society sold their building at 11 Lincoln Street and relocated to the Park Row duplex.

Later that same year the former home of Civil War hero Joshua L. Chamberlain was auctioned off following the death of its owner. At the request of local citizens, the society purchased the building and began extensive restoration work. In July 1984 the house was opened to the public as the Joshua L. Chamberlain Museum.

== See also ==
- List of historical societies in Maine
