= Pejepscot =

Historical village in Maine

- Villages
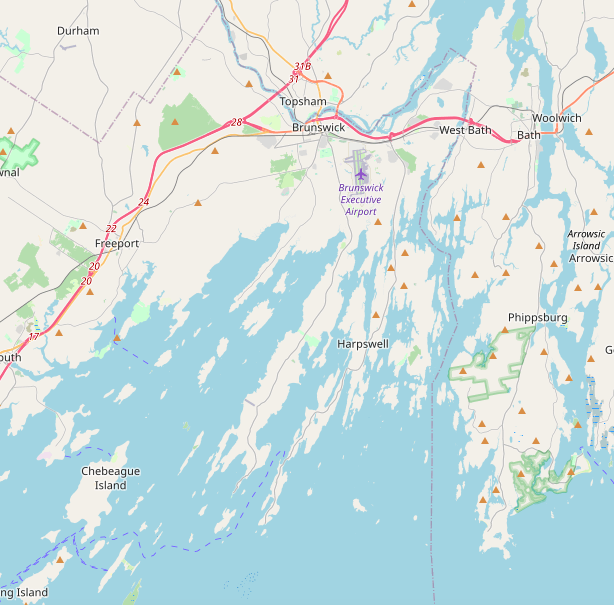
- Current towns of Brunswick, Topsham and Harpswell, Maine
- Country: United States
- State: Maine
- County: Sagadahoc; Cumberland
- Settled: 1628
- End date: 1717
- Founder: Thomas Purchase
- Towns: Brunswick; Topsham; Harpswell

Government
  - Type: Self-governing colony
  - Body: Massachusetts Bay Colony 1639

Population (1715)
  - Total: 30–40
- Website: pejepscothistorical.org

Pejepscot is a historical settlement first occupied by a subset of the Androscoggin Native Americans (formerly known as the Anasagunticooks), known as the Wabanaki. The region encompasses the current towns of Brunswick, Topsham and Harpswell, Maine, in Sagadahoc and Cumberland counties and was first settled by English settlers in 1628.

== History ==
=== Native Americans ===
Before the European colonization of the Americas, Pejepscot was inhabited by the Wabanaki Native Americans. The word Pejepscot has its roots in the Wabanaki language and has different translations ("long, rocky rapids part" and "crooked like a diving snake"). This area refers to a specific section of the Androscoggin River, the major waterway and lifeblood for all who inhabited the region.

Pejepscot is the current towns of Brunswick, Topsham, and Harpswell, Maine, in Sagadahoc and Cumberland counties.

=== Colonization ===
In the year 1620, a charter was granted by King James II of England to "forty noblemen, knights, and gentlemen", calling themselves the Plymouth Company. Their territory extended from the fourteenth to the forty-eighth parallel of latitude, and from sea to sea.

Arriving in 1628, the first permanent European settler in Pejepscot was Thomas Purchase from Dorchester, Dorset, England. On June 16, 1632, the Plymouth Company granted a patent to Purchase and his brother in-law George Way for the lands at Pejepscot, in the current towns of Brunswick, Topsham and Harpswell Maine. Purchase settled at Pejepscot Falls adjacent to the Site of Fort Andross.

In the proceedings of the Plymouth Council in England, the following minutes were entered:

(Early Modern English) "16 June 1632. 8 Cat. I. The said Councill graunt certaine, called the River Bishopscott, unto George Way and Thomas Purchase.... A Graunt part to George Way and Thomas Purchase of certaine Lands in New England, called the River Bishopscotte (Pejepscot), and all that Bounds and Limitts of the Maine Land, adjoining to the said River to extend two myles: from the said River Northwards four myles, and the Pejepscot proprietors reserved seven hundred acres of land for the heirs of Thomas Purchase, i.e., "Elizabeth and her five children by Mr. Purchase, and her son, Samuel Pike." from the house 1 there to the Ocean sea with all other Profitts and Commodities whatsoever, paying to the King one fifth part of gold and silver oare, and another fifth part to the President and Councill, also paying twelve pense to the said President and Councill for every hundred Acres of Ground in use, to the rent- gatherer for the time being, as by the same Graunt may appeare."

— Sainsbury (1632). Colonial Papers. Vol. 1 (52). England: Plymouth Council. p. 7.

On August 22, 1639, the purchase made a legal agreement with John Winthrop, Governor of Massachusetts, placing his land under the jurisdiction of that colony. This was a right to jurisdiction only, not to the soil.

On July 7, 1684, after Purchase fled to Boston during King Philip's War, the land was next settled and purchased through Native Americans by Richard Wharton, a Boston merchant, except for a few islands, in 1714. In the Massachusetts General Court, the land was sold to a group of Boston merchants. organized as the Pejepscot Proprietors. They sold land in small lots as a commercial enterprise to establish a settlement.

By 1715, in the Brunswick portion of Pejepscot, there were only thirty to forty residents. The region of Pejepscot kept that name and location until the Massachusetts General Court constituted the three towns.

Table
| Town | Year of name change |
|---|---|
| Brunswick, Maine | 1717 |
| Harpswell, Maine | 1733 |
| Topsham, Maine | 1764 |

== Archaeological sites ==
=== Pejepscot Site ===
- Pejepscot Site
- U.S. National Register of Historic Places
- Nearest city: Topsham, Maine
- Area: 0.7 acres (0.28 ha)
- NRHP reference No.: 87000922
- Added to NRHP: June 12, 1987

The Pejepscot Site is a prehistoric archaeological site on the banks of the Androscoggin River in Topsham, Maine. The site is a small Native American habitation site dating to the Late woodland or early classic stage. It was discovered in the 1980s during planning for a water power project on the river above Brunswick Falls.

=== Merrymeeting Bay Pioneers Project ===
In 2020, the Merrymeeting Bay Pioneers Project found a 17th-century dwelling in a field at the Hunter Farm on Foreside Road in Topsham. The home, built in a field, was made of wood, clay, and stone. Stones were placed beneath the timbers to keep them from rotting.

=== Fort Andross ===
In 2018, an archaeological excavation found pottery from the 1800s in the parking lot of Fort Andross. Representatives from Maine Preservation also discovered a 3-foot wall dating to the same era.
