= Thomas Purchase =

English settler in Maine (1577–1678)

- Born: 1577; Dorchester, Dorset, Kingdom of England
- Died: 1678 (aged 100–101); Lynn, Massachusetts, Massachusetts Bay Colony
- Occupation: Trader
- Years active: 1628–1678
- Era: Colonial (U.S.)
- Known for: First settler of Pejepscot (1628)
- Spouses: Mary Purchase (m. 1631–1656) Elizabeth Blaney (m. 1657–1677)

Thomas Purchase (1577–1678), also known as Thomas Purchis and Thomas Purchas, was the first English settler to occupy the region of Pejepscot, Maine in what is now Brunswick, Topsham and Harpswell. In 1628 he set up a trading post at the site of Fort Andross to barter with the local Wabanaki Native Americans.

== Early life ==
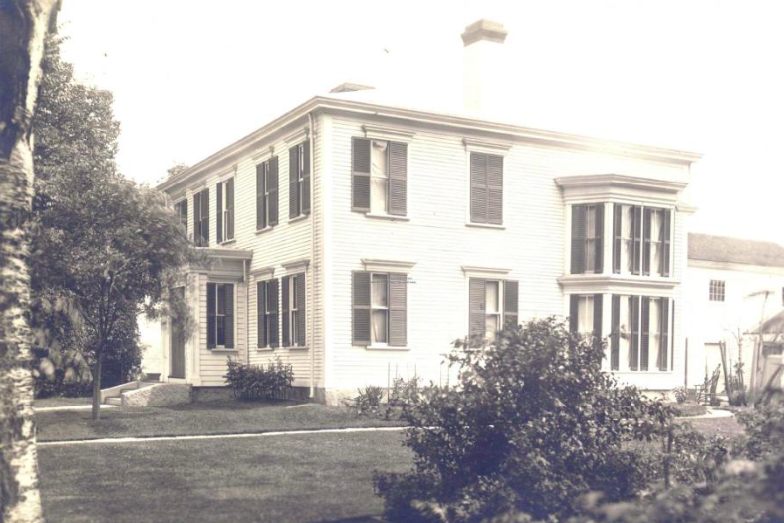
Approximate location of Purchase's house and fishery (picture of Daniel Stone House, c. 1920)

Thomas Purchase was born in 1577 at Dorchester, Dorset, England, to Oliver Purchase and Thomesin (Harris) Purchase.

On August 6, 1613, a fire broke out in Dorchester, burning down 170 homes, setting the impetus for the future colonization movement of Massachusetts that led to the Massachusetts Bay Company. In the years after the first fire, the town was plagued with overpopulation. By the time of the next fire in 1622, John White, a Puritan minister, convinced the people of Dorchester to start a new company and head to the New World. The name of this group of investors was called the Dorchester Company. When the company failed, the original investors were part of the group that formed the Massachusetts Bay Company.

== Settling in Maine ==
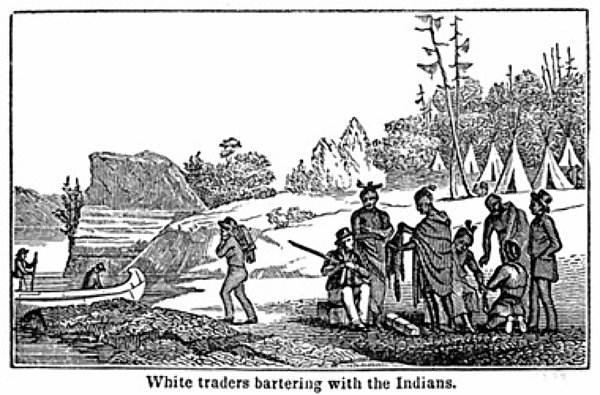
Trading with natives

Although it is unknown which ship carried Purchase to North America or the exact date, it is documented that he made a return trip from England in 1629. He boarded the ship The Lyon (not to be confused with Lyon's Whelp), leaving Bristol England on April 5, along with five other ships, arriving in Salem, Massachusetts. He was 53 years old.

Purchase was the first English settler in what is now called Brunswick, Maine. Before it was incorporated into a town in 1739, the region was known by the Wabanaki Native Americans as Pejepscot (long, rocky rapids part), encompassing the current towns of Brunswick, Topsham, and Harpswell, Maine.

In 1628, Purchase settled in Saco, Maine, then in Pejepscot. He became acquainted with the value of the land which he afterward acquired. On June 16, 1632, the Plymouth Company granted a patent to Purchase and his brother-in-law George Way.

With this new deed, Purchase set up a trading post, where the natives already had one, to buy and sell goods, mainly salmon, sturgeon and furs on a section of the Androscoggin River known as Pejepscot Falls, adjacent to the Site of Fort Andross.

The location of Thomas Purchase's residence in Brunswick is unclear, but one of his homes where he cured fish may have been located near a lot on Water Street in Brunswick, located near Captain Daniel Stone's estate.

On August 22, 1639, he made a legal conveyance to John Winthrop, Governor of Massachusetts, of all his land and put himself under the jurisdiction of that colony.

Throughout his time at Pejepscot, Purchase was a fisherman, hunter, trader and raised cattle. He bartered with the natives and other settlers with a rich stock of salmon, sturgeon, and shad, as well as wildlife game. Purchase had a monopoly on the area and would cure and pack fish for export to London. He was also a farmer cultivating soil and had enough maize to store for the winter.

== King Philip's War ==
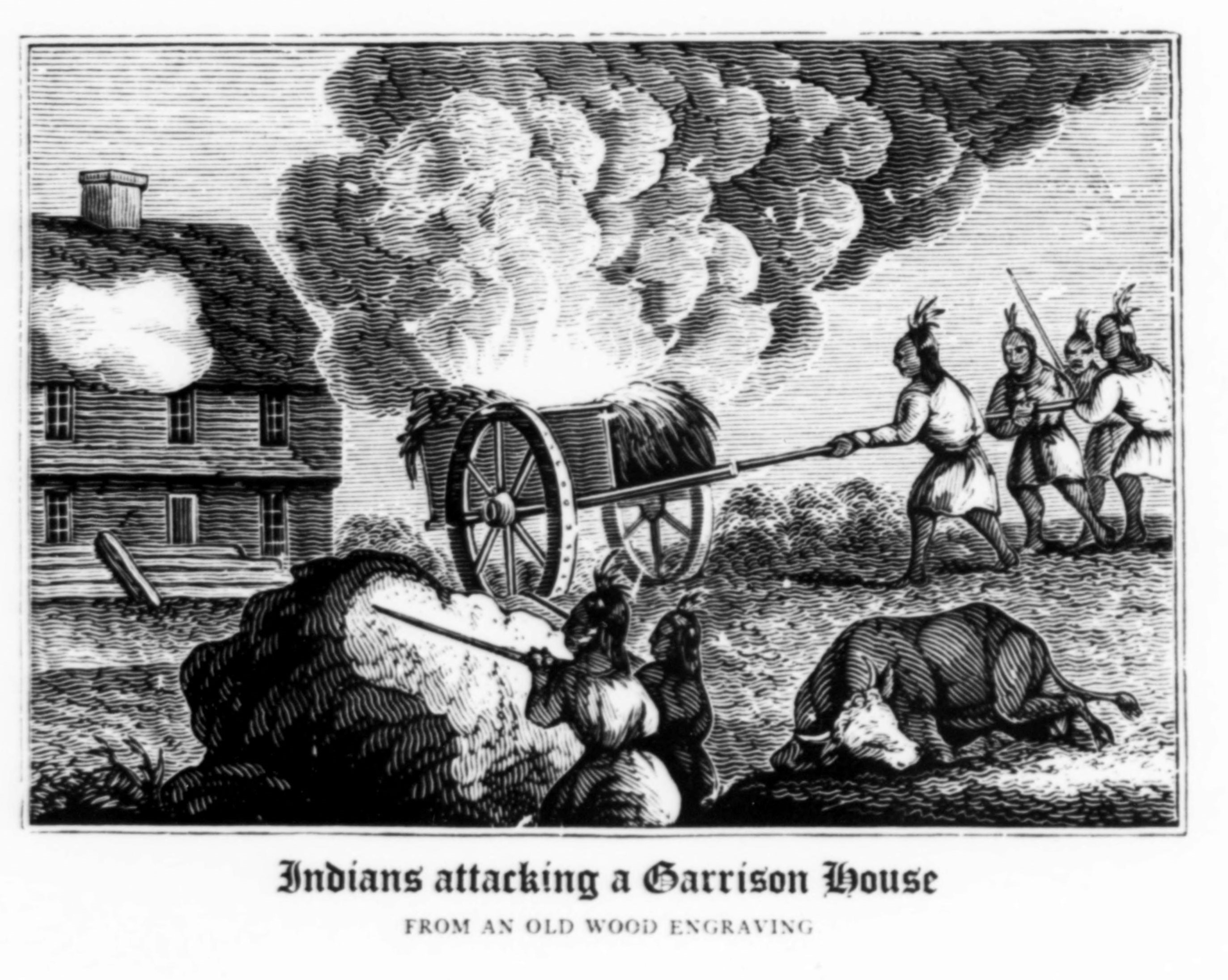
Attack on a Garrison House

In 1675, King Philip's War between Native Americans and New England colonists broke out. By September of that year, hostilities commenced at Pejepscot. A party of twenty natives went to Purchase's house and pretended to his wife that they wished to trade. Discovering that her husband and son were absent, they robbed the house. Purchase's son returned home while this happened and fled for his life. The following year Purchase's house was burned by the natives.

With the destruction of his home, Purchase lost the only copy of the patent that held his property. The original had been left with Mr. Francis Ashley in England. Soon after this fire, along with other settlers, he moved to a nearby island where they waited for a ship to take them to Lynn, Massachusetts, where he lived the rest of his life.

== Family and death ==
Thomas Purchase was married twice. His first wife was Mary Gove. The marriage occurred in 1631; Gove died in Boston on January 7, 1656. His second marriage, in 1657, was to Elizabeth Williams; they had five children together, four daughters and one son. Their children were Thomas Purchase Jr., Jane Purchase, Elizabeth Purchase, and two unnamed daughters. Thomas Purchase Jr. was reported lost at sea in 1685.

The Probate court at Lynn, Massachusetts, dates Thomas Purchase's death to 1678, at 101 years old.
