= Maine Street =

Street in Brunswick, Maine

Coordinates: 43.91158°N 69.96336°W

- Twelve Rod Road (former)
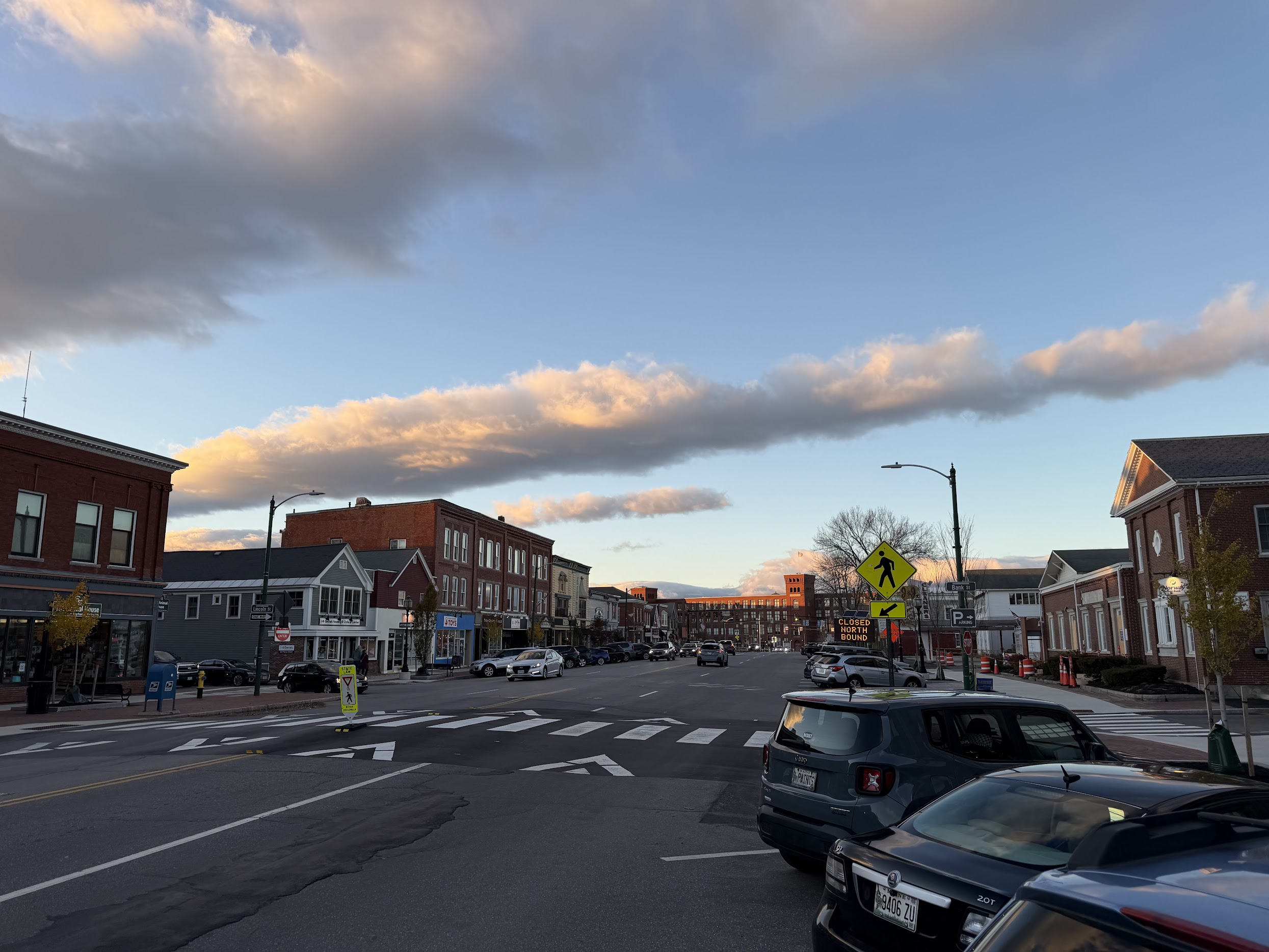
- Looking north toward Fort Andross
- Part of: US 201; SR 24
- Length: 2.2 mi (3.5 km)
- Location: Brunswick, Maine, U.S.
- Northern end: Main Street, Topsham
- Southern end: Mere Point Road/Pleasant Hill Road, Brunswick

Construction
- Completion: 1717 (309 years ago)

Maine Street is the main street passing through Brunswick, Maine, United States. Laid out in 1717, it runs for around 2 miles (3.2 km), from its convergence with Main Street in Topsham in the north to a convergence with Mere Point Road and an intersection with Pleasant Hill Road in the south. The street is part of Brunswick Commercial Historic District. In 2026, Travel + Leisure magazine named Maine Street fourth in its list of America's most charming Main Streets.

The Pejepscot Falls Bridge separates Brunswick and Topsham, on the northern side of the Androscoggin River's Brunswick Falls. At its northern end, Maine Street forms the starting point of U.S. Route 201 (US 201). Topsham's Main Street picks up the designation at the bridge's midpoint. At its southern extremity, Maine Street picks up the Maine State Route 24 (SR 24) designation, which it carries north to its intersection with Bath Road, beside Bowdoin College. The need for the route to bypass downtown Brunswick arose because of the low capacity of the Frank J. Wood Bridge (the predecessor to the Pejepscot Falls Bridge).

Maine Street was named Twelve Rod Road prior to Maine's statehood in 1820. A rod is an imperial unit equal to 16.5 feet (5.0 m) making the width of Maine Street equal to 198 feet (60 m), one of the state's broadest main streets.

Maine Street was formerly the route of the old Indian trail which led between the falls of the Androscoggin and Maquoit Bay. On June 3, 1717, by order of the Pejepscot Proprietors, construction started on the road spanning from Fort George to Maquoit Bay. From Bowdoin College south to Maquoit Bay, a mile distant, the street would be split and called Mere Point Road.

U.S. Route 1 passes beneath Maine Street just south of the Pejepscot Falls Bridge, while major intersections along its route (from north to south) are Pleasant Street, Bath Road (SR 24) and Pleasant Hill Road.

== Points of interest ==
Notable points along its route include (from north to south):

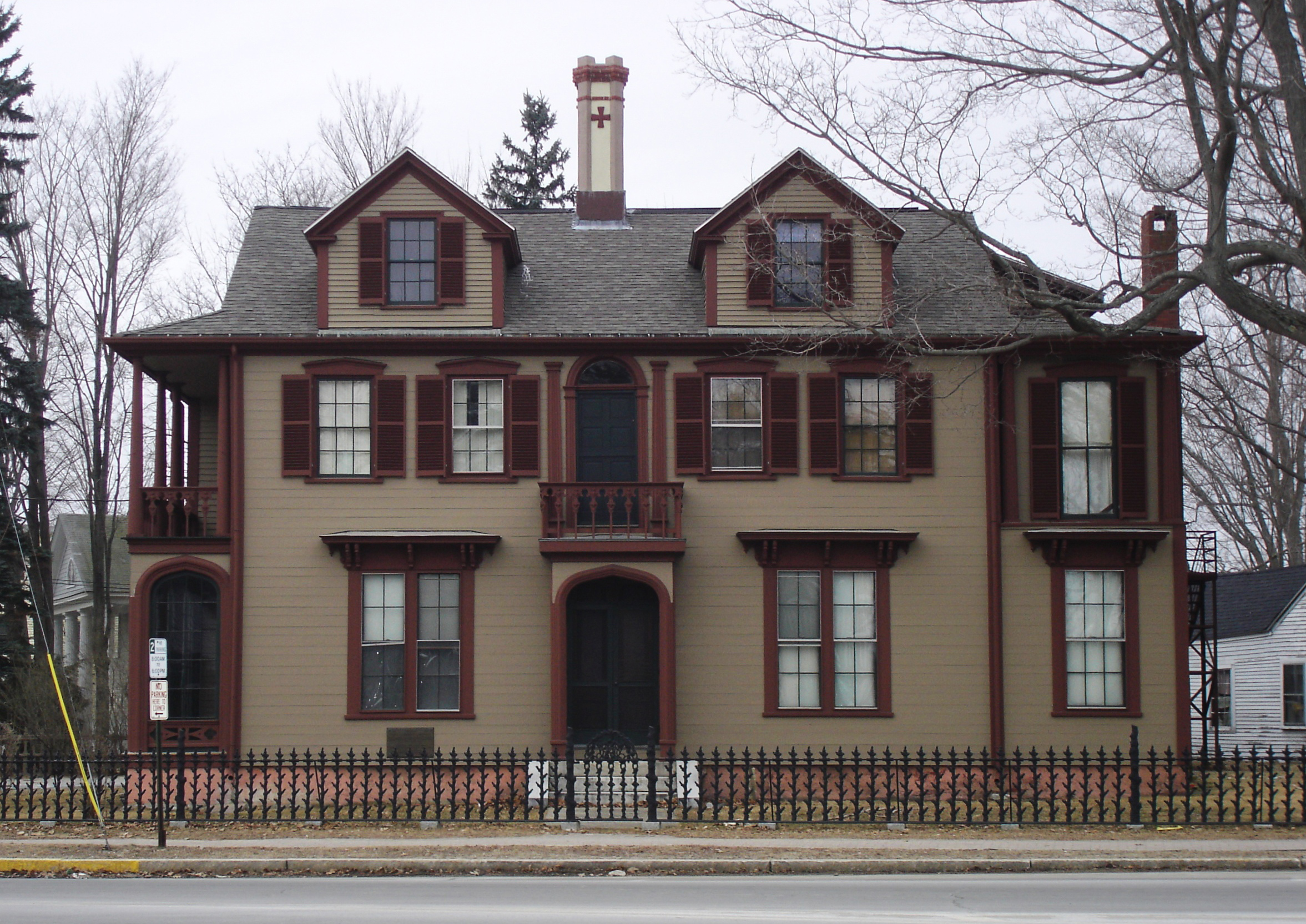
The Joshua L. Chamberlain Museum

- Fort Andross
- Morning Glory Natural Foods, one of the oldest businesses in Brunswick, established in 1981
- Lower Mall
- First Parish United Church of Christ, 207 Maine Street. Founded 1845 and added to the National Register of Historic Places in 1969
- Joshua L. Chamberlain Museum
- Bowdoin College
- Upper Mall

Park Row runs parallel to Maine Street from Lower Mall to just north of Whittier Street, beyond the Bowdoin campus.

Brunswick Amtrak station is sometimes knows as "Brunswick Maine Street station", even though it is located off of Maine Street, on Station Avenue.

Brunswick's original town hall formerly stood in the Lemont Block, completed in 1870, at the northern corner of the Maine Street and Pleasant Street intersection. The town hall was destroyed in the 1960s.

The Tontine Hotel stood on the eastern side of Maine Street, at its intersection with School Street, between 1828 and 1904. The Maine Medical Association was established at the hotel in 1853.

== Commercial and residential areas ==
Maine Street itself is almost wholly commercial, with businesses up until Lower Mall on the eastern side of the street and until around Bath Road on the western side. The principal residential streets of Brunswick adjoin Maine Street: Pleasant Street, Cumberland Street, Lincoln Street and High Street on its western side, and Federal Street to the east.
