= Jesse Appleton =

Second president of Bowdoin College (1772–1819)

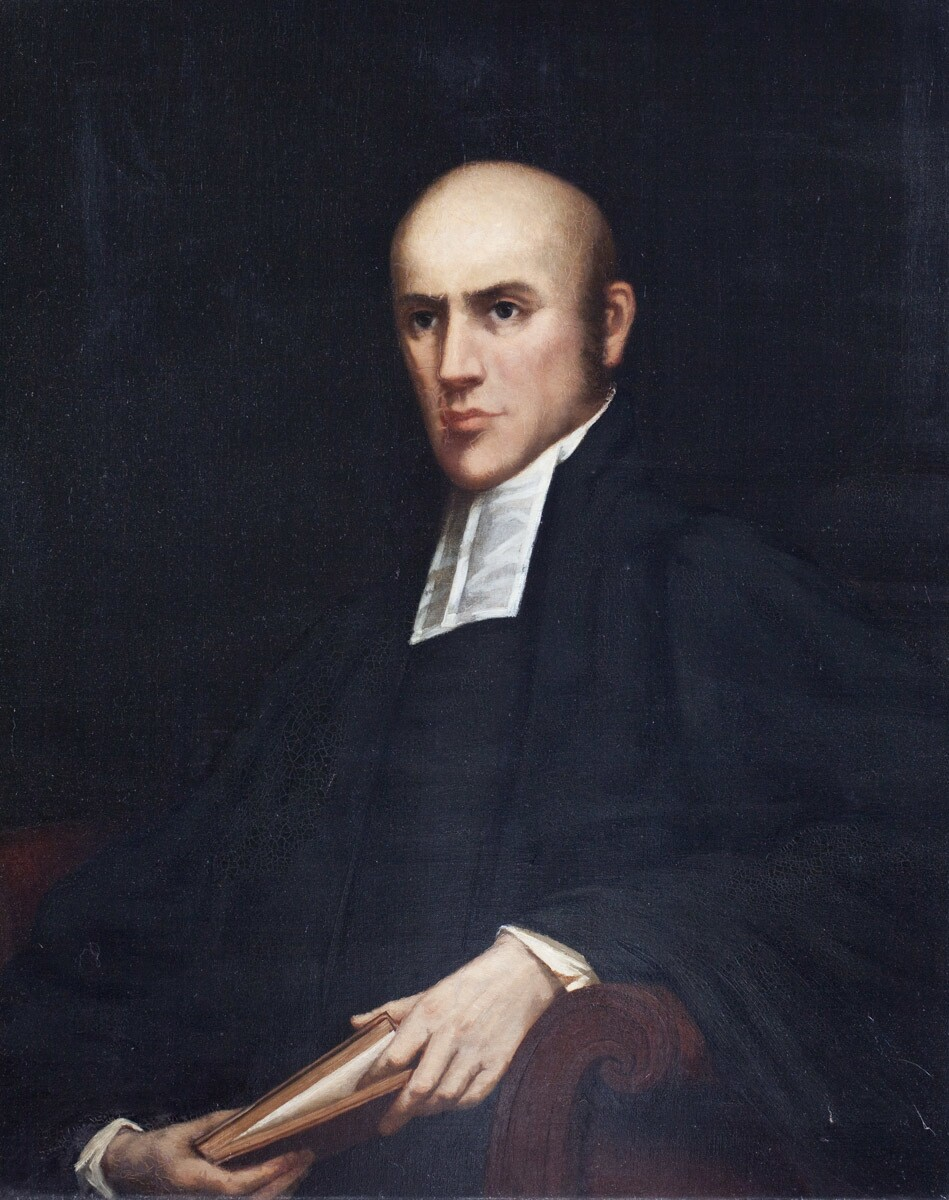

2nd President of Bowdoin College
- In office 1809–1819
- Preceded by: Joseph McKeen
- Succeeded by: William Allen

Personal details
- Born: November 17, 1772 New Ipswich, New Hampshire
- Died: November 12, 1819 (aged 46) Brunswick, Maine
- Spouse: Elizabeth Means
- Children: Mary; Frances; Jane; William; John
- Relatives: Appleton family
- Education: Dartmouth College (1792)
- Profession: Professor

Jesse Appleton (November 17, 1772 – November 12, 1819) was the second president of Bowdoin College and the father of Jane Pierce, the First Lady of the United States.

== Early life ==
Appleton was born on November 17, 1772, in New Ipswich, New Hampshire. He was the son of Francis Appleton (1733–1816) and Elizabeth (née Hubbard) Appleton (1730–1815).

He graduated from Dartmouth College in Hanover, New Hampshire, in 1792.

== Career ==
After graduating from Dartmouth, Appleton worked at a parish in Hampton, New Hampshire. In the early 19th century, he received the honorary degree of Doctor of Divinity from both Dartmouth and Harvard University. In 1807, he was appointed president of Bowdoin, where he remained until he died of tuberculosis in 1819. A congregationalist minister and prominent Christian lecturer, Appleton was notably determined to make Bowdoin students more pious. He worked at the school, right before it reached its full prominence in the 1820s, when Nathaniel Hawthorne, Henry Wadsworth Longfellow, and Franklin Pierce attended.

He was elected a Fellow of the American Academy of Arts and Sciences in 1810, and was elected a member of the American Antiquarian Society in 1813.

== Personal life ==
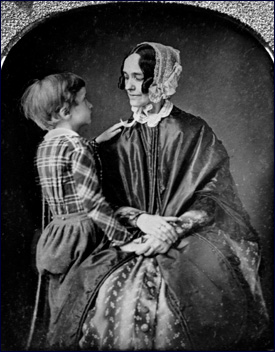
Appleton's daughter, Jane Pierce with her last surviving son, Benjamin Pierce, who died in 1853 in a train crash, two months before his father was sworn into office as president.

He married Elizabeth Means (1779–1844). Elizabeth was the daughter of Stewartstown, County Tyrone, Ireland born Robert Means (1742–1823) and Mary McGregor (1752–1838). His wife's sister, Mary Means (1777–1858), was married to Jeremiah Mason on November 6, 1799. Together, Jesse and Elizabeth were the parents of five children who survived through infancy, including:

- Mary Means Appleton (1801–1883), who married John Aiken (1797–1867)
- Frances Appleton (1804–1839), who married famed Bowdoin professor Alpheus Spring Packard, Sr. (1798–1884) who edited The Works of Rev. Jesse Appleton, D.D., with a Memoir of His Life and Character in 1837.
- Jane Means Appleton (1806–1863), who would become First Lady to President Franklin Pierce on November 19, 1834.
- William Appleton (1808–1830), who died unmarried.
- John Appleton (1814–1817), who died young.

Appleton died on November 12, 1819, in Brunswick, Maine. He is interred at Pine Grove Cemetery in Brunswick.

=== Descendants ===
Through his daughter Mary, he was the grandfather of William Appleton Aiken (1833–1929), who in 1861 married Eliza Coit Buckingham (1838–1924), and Mary Appleton Aiken, who in 1868 married Francis H. Snow (1840–1908), a professor and chancellor of the University of Kansas who became prominent through the discovery of a fungus fatal to chinch bugs and its propagation and distribution.

Through his daughter Frances, he was the grandfather of four boys and one girl, including William Alfred Packard (1830-1909), an 1851 alumnus of Bowdoin, Alpheus Spring Packard Jr. (1839–1905), a Civil War surgeon, entomologist who corresponded with Charles Darwin, Charles A. Packard, George Packard, and Frances Appleton Packard.

Through his daughter Jane, he was the grandfather of Franklin Pierce, Jr. (1836–1836), who died young, Franklin "Frank" Robert Pierce (1839–1843), who died at age four from epidemic typhus, and Benjamin Pierce (1841–1853), who died two months before Pierce's inauguration as president when the passenger car of the train they were traveling in broke loose and rolled down an embankment.

| Preceded by Joseph McKeen | President of Bowdoin College; 1807–19 | Succeeded by William Allen |
