= William Smyth (professor) =

American academic and writer (1797–1868)

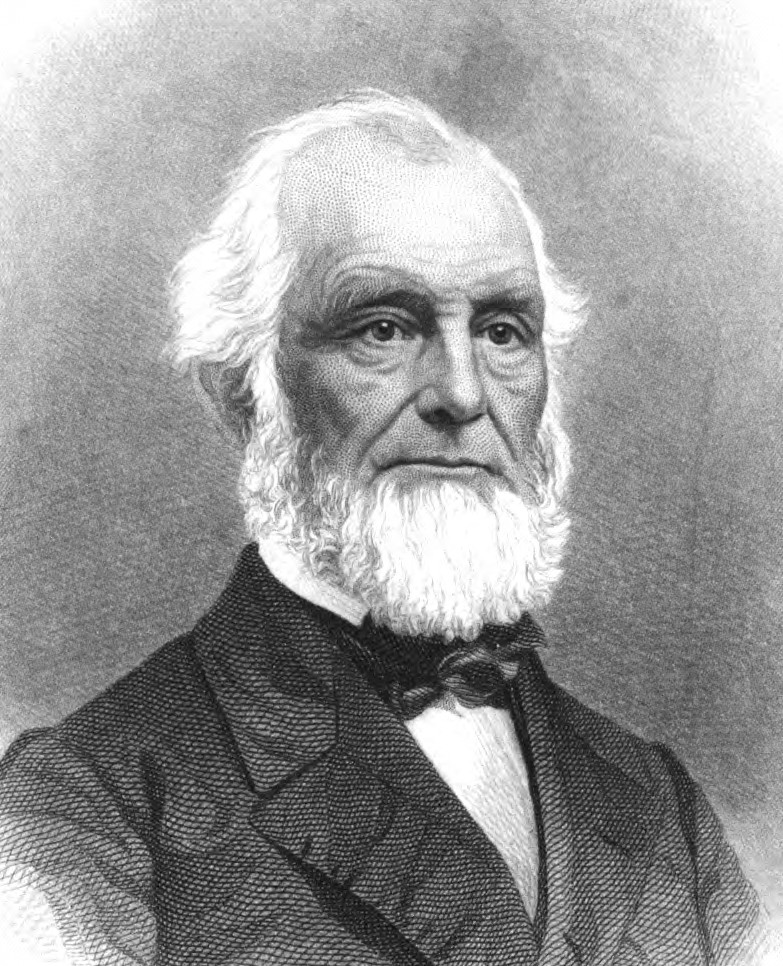
- Born: February 2, 1797; Pittston, Maine, U.S.
- Died: April 3, 1868 (aged 71); Brunswick, Maine, U.S.
- Education: Bowdoin College; Andover Theological Seminary
- Occupation: Academic
- Spouse: Harriet Porter
- Children: 9

Signature
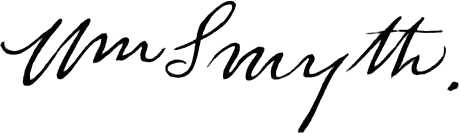

William Smyth (February 2, 1797 – April 3, 1868) was an American academic and writer on mathematics and other subjects.

== Early life ==
William Smyth was born in Pittston, Massachusetts (which became part of Maine is 1820) on February 2, 1797. He graduated from Bowdoin College in 1822, then studied theology at Andover Theological Seminary.

== Career ==
In 1825, he became a professor of mathematics at Bowdoin College, and in 1846 became an associate professor of natural philosophy. The Bowdoin College Department of Mathematics Smyth Prize is named in his honor.

Smyth was an ardent abolitionist of slavery and supporter of the temperance movement. While at Bowdoin, Smyth supported the effort to the First Parish Church, which is now on the National Register of Historic Places.

== Personal life ==
Smyth married Harriet Porter, daughter of Mary (née Porter) and Nathaniel Coffin. They had nine children.

He died in Brunswick, Maine in April 1868. He is interred at Pine Grove Cemetery in Brunswick.

== Bibliography ==
Smyth wrote several widely used textbooks:

- Elements of Algebra (1833) digitized version
- Elementary Algebra for Schools (1850) digitized version
- Treatise on Algebra" (1852) digitized version
- Trigonometry, Surveying, and Navigation(1855) digitized version
- Elements of Analytical Geometry" (1855)
- Elements of the Differential and Integral Calculus" (1856; 2d ed., 1859) digitized version
- Lectures on Modern History, edited by Jared Sparks (1849) digitized version
