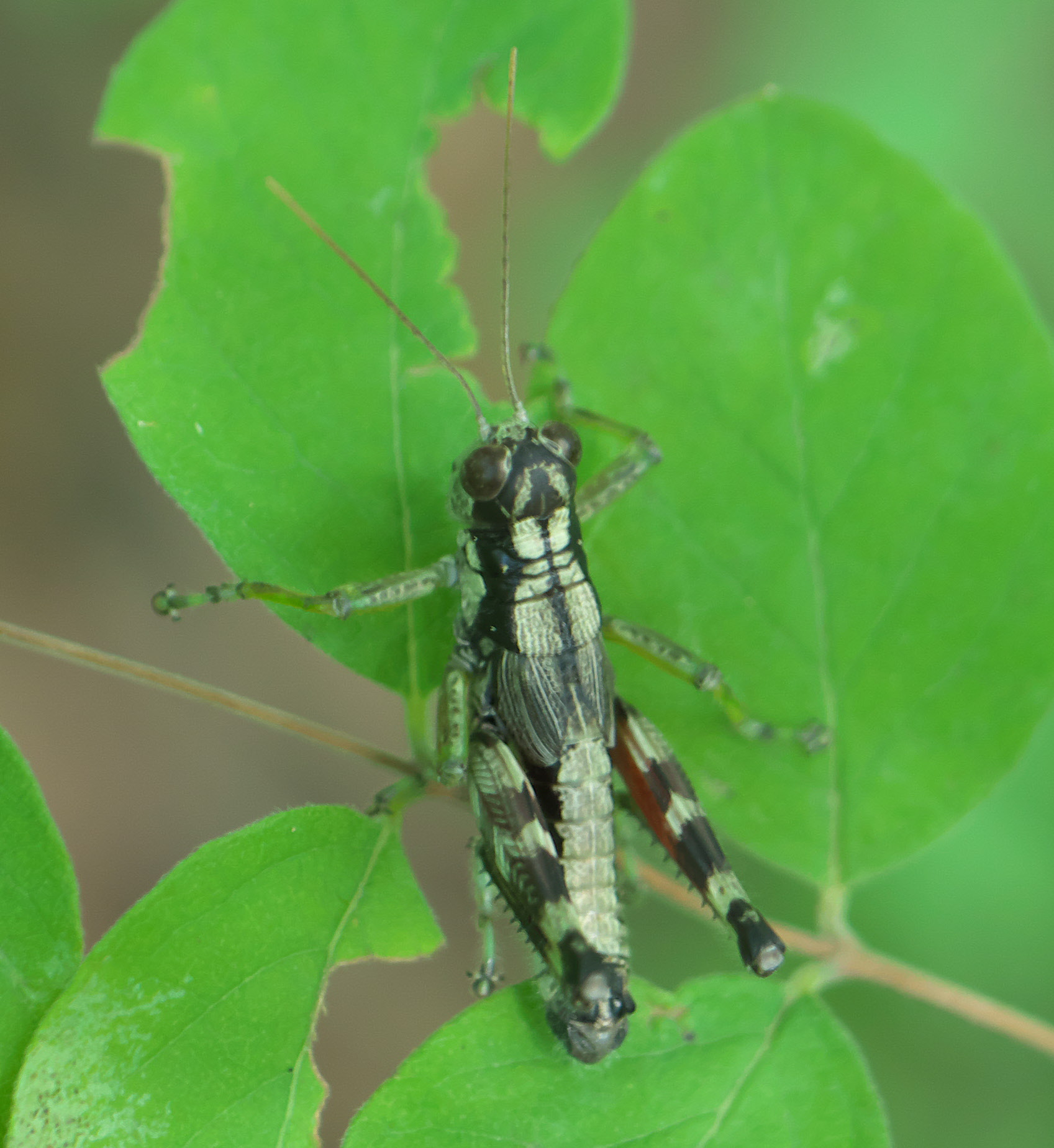
- Dendrotettix quercus, Oklahoma

Scientific classification
- Kingdom: Animalia
- Phylum: Arthropoda
- Clade: Pancrustacea
- Class: Insecta
- Order: Orthoptera
- Suborder: Caelifera
- Family: Acrididae
- Tribe: Podismini
- Genus: Dendrotettix
- Species: D. quercus

Binomial name
- Dendrotettix quercus Packard, 1890

= Dendrotettix quercus =

Species of grasshopper

Dendrotettix quercus, known generally as the post oak grasshopper or post-oak locust, is a species of spur-throated grasshopper in the family Acrididae. It is found in North America.
