= Indian Trail =

Indian Trail may refer to:

- A part of or the whole of the Great Trail created by Native Americans
- Indian Trail, North Carolina
- Indian Trails, an intercity bus service provider in and around Michigan
- Indian Trails Conference, a high school athletic conference in Wisconsin

== See also ==
- Indian Trail School (disambiguation)
- Indian Trails Middle School (disambiguation)
- Indian Trails Council (disambiguation)
