= Massachusetts Hall, Bowdoin College =

- U.S. National Register of Historic Places
- U.S. Historic district – Contributing property
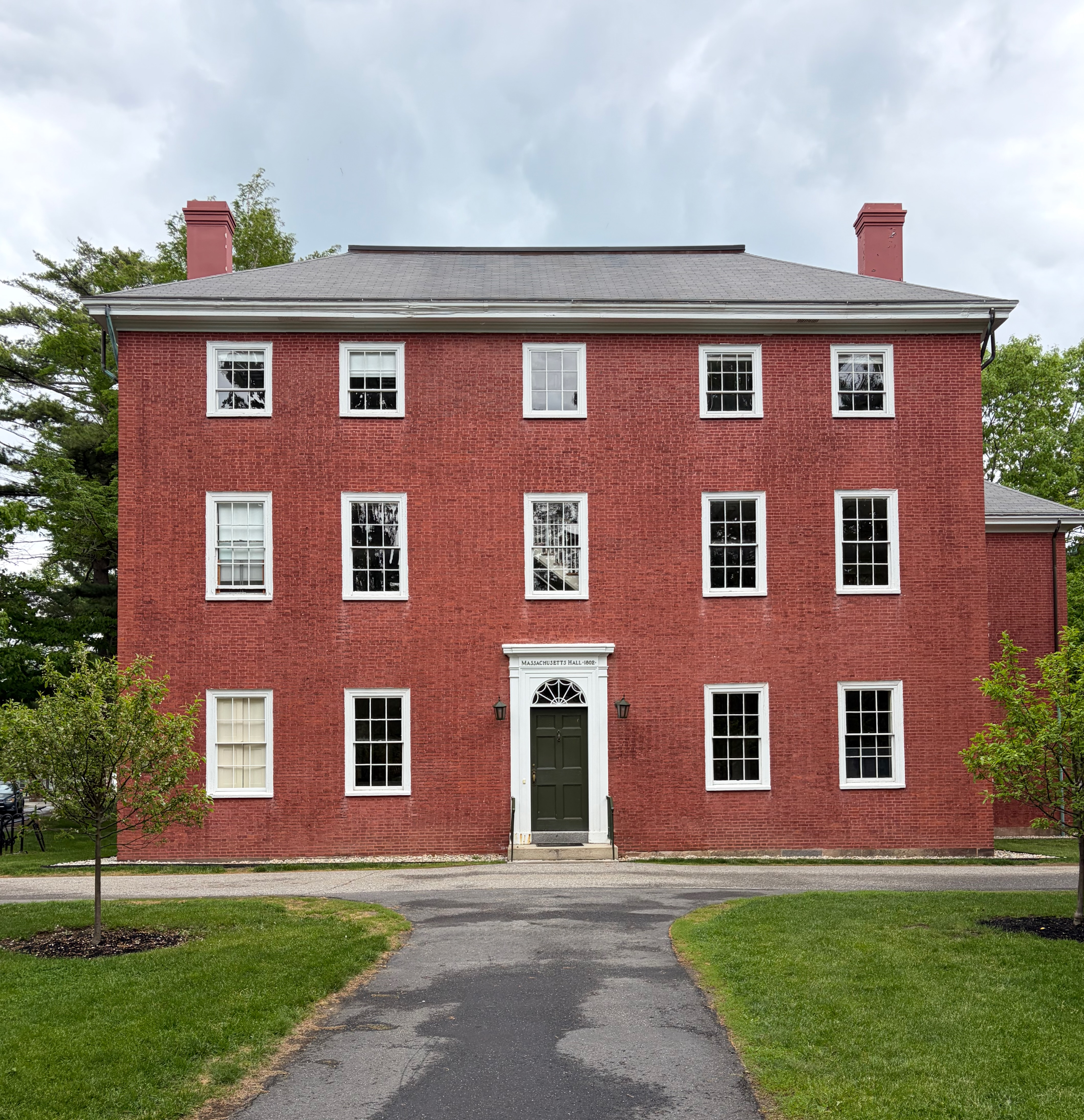
- Front of Massachusetts Hall

- Location within Maine Location within the United States
- Location: Bowdoin College campus, Brunswick, Maine
- Coordinates: 43°54′35″N 69°57′43″W
- Area: less than one acre
- Built: 1798
- Architect: Samuel and Aaron Melcher (1798); Abel C. Martin (1872); Felix A. Burton (1936–37)
- Architectural style: Federal
- Part of: Federal Street Historic District (ID76000092)
- NRHP reference No.: 71000042

Significant dates
- Added to NRHP: July 27, 1971
- Designated CP: October 29, 1976

Massachusetts Hall is the oldest building on the campus of Bowdoin College, in Brunswick, Maine. It was built 1798–1802, and has seen a number of uses during the school's long history. The building was listed on the National Register of Historic Places in 1971.

== Description and history ==
Massachusetts Hall is located at the northern end of the Bowdoin Campus, just south of Bath Street and east of Memorial Hall, home to the Pickard Theatre. It is a three-story red-brick structure, with a hip roof and granite trim elements, and a 2-1/2 story ell extending to one side. The main block measures 50.5 by 40.5 feet (15.4 m × 12.3 m), and is five bays wide, with a central entrance flanked by pilasters and topped by a half-round transom and cornice. The building's third-floor windows are smaller, a typical Federal period feature.

Bowdoin College was chartered in 1794, and its leadership authorized construction of its first building in 1798. Construction began that year, but was brought to a halt by a lack of funding. The college trustees sold off land elsewhere in Maine to fund its completion, and it was dedicated in 1802. At first, it housed both students and the family of the first president, Joseph McKeen. In 1803 the president's quarters (roughly the eastern half of the first two floors) were converted into laboratory and lecture spaces on the first floor, and student rooms on the second. This lecture space was used by Parker Cleaveland until 1859. In 1872–73 the interior underwent a major alteration, converting the upper two floors into a single large hall, which was used to house a museum of artifacts related to Cleaveland. This work was done under the direction of Boston architect Abel C. Martin. In 1936–37, architect Felix A. Burton oversaw another major rehabilitation, which including restoration of the exterior to its original configuration, and the interior to its present state.

== See also ==
- Parker Cleaveland House
- National Register of Historic Places listings in Cumberland County, Maine
