= Massachusetts Hall =

Massachusetts Hall may refer to:

- Massachusetts Hall (Harvard University), in Cambridge, Massachusetts
- Massachusetts Hall, Bowdoin College, in Brunswick, Maine
