= Brunswick Commercial Historic District =

Historic district in Brunswick, Maine, U.S.

- U.S. National Register of Historic Places
- U.S. Historic district
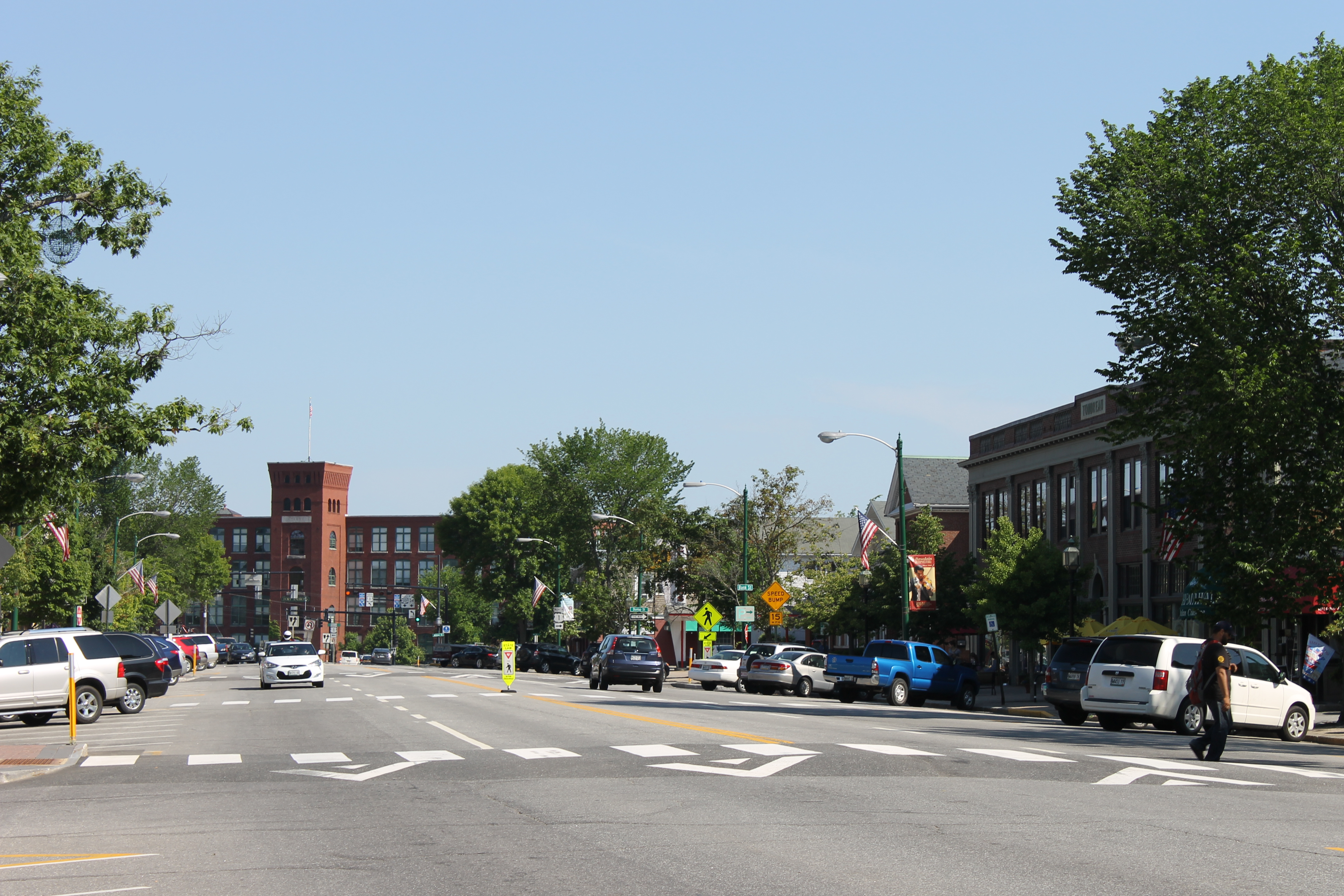
- A view of Maine Street

- Location within Maine Location within the United States
- Location: 50–151 Maine Street
- Coordinates: 43°54′57″N 69°57′56″W
- Area: 14 acres (5.7 ha)
- Architect: multiple
- Architectural style: Colonial Revival
- NRHP reference No.: 15000968
- Added to NRHP: January 12, 2016
- Maine Street
- Interactive map of Maine Street
- Former name: Twelve-Rod Road
- Part of: Route 201
- Namesake: Maine
- Width: 198 feet (60 m)
- Area: Midcoast, Maine
- Location: Brunswick, Maine
- Postal code: 04011
- Coordinates: 43.9146°N 69.9648°W

Other
- Known for: Only "Main Street" in the U.S. state of Maine named "Maine Street"
- Status: Still in use

The Brunswick Commercial Historic District encompasses the historic late-19th century commercial core of Brunswick, Maine. It includes the northern four blocks of Maine Street, the town's principal commercial thoroughfare, which was laid out in the late 17th century. The district was listed on the National Register of Historic Places in 2016.

== National Register of Historic Places ==
The Brunswick Commercial Historic District consists of the northern four blocks of Maine Street, including most of the buildings between Mill and Pleasant Streets. These buildings are typically one or two stories in height, either of brick or frame construction. Most of them are Colonial Revival architecture in style, although a number of earlier 19th century revival styles are also represented. Retail storefronts predominate on the ground floors, with professional offices or residences on the upper floors. One architecturally prominent building is Lemont Block at Maine and Pleasant, it is a three-story brick Second Empire style structure built in 1870.

== History ==
=== Brunswick, Maine ===
The town of Brunswick's early colonial history begins with the establishment of Fort Andross, on the south bank of the Androscoggin River near the former Cabot Mill site, in 1688. The town of Brunswick was chartered in 1737, and was initially powered economically by mills along the river, and by maritime trade. Bowdoin College was chartered in 1794, with its campus south of the commercial district, and the mills were expanded in the 19th century, especially after the railroad arrived in 1849. In the 20th century, Brunswick Naval Air Station, southeast of the downtown, also provided an economic benefit to the region.

=== Maine Street ===
Maine Street is the town's prominent thoroughfare, laid out in the late 17th century.

== Notes ==
a. On the inside front cover of the 2nd ed. (1974), the Pejepscot Historical Society states "The History of Brunswick, Topsham, and Harpswell, Maine has long been considered the authoritative text on the three towns through 1878."
b. This article incorporates text from this source, which is in the public domain.

== See also ==
- National Register of Historic Places listings in Cumberland County, Maine
