= Tontine Hotel =

Former hotel in Brunswick, Maine

- Pictured around 1890, viewed from the end of Pleasant Street
- Interactive map of Tontine Hotel

Restaurant information
- Established: 1828
- Closed: 1904
- Location: Maine Street, Brunswick, Maine, 04011, United States
- Coordinates: 43.914880°N 69.964508°W

Tontine Hotel was a hotel and restaurant in Brunswick, Maine, which was in business between 1828 and 1904. Located at the intersection of Maine Street and School Streets, it was known as the "premier hotel for travelers to Brunswick at the turn of the [20th] century." A new building and the Tontine Mall (completed in 1922) stand in its place today.

The hotel, completed in 1828, was four stories tall and was recognized as one of the greatest "landmarks of all Maine." It contained thirty apartments, a banquet hall and stables for fifty horses. Notable guests included United States President Franklin Pierce, Senator James G. Blaine and poet Henry Wadsworth Longfellow.

The Maine Medical Association was established at the hotel on April 28, 1853, after a meeting of 27 physicians. A plaque atop a granite post was erected near the location on the 150th anniversary of the meeting. It lists the attending physicians.

In 1856, the hotel's proprietor was James Berry.

== Fire ==
In the early hours of January 5, 1904, a fire was intentionally started in the hotel's kitchen, by 67-year-old night clerk Alonzo Colby, in an attempt to thaw frozen pipes. The temperature was "eight degrees below zero" at the time. The damage was such that the hotel was not rebuilt and was eventually demolished.

An earlier fire struck the hotel's ell in January 1898.

In an attempt to capitalize on Brunswick no longer having a first-class hotel, Fred J. Harrigan constructed the Hotel Eagle, located where today's Hannaford grocery store is, off the southern side of Maine Street. It opened six months after the loss of the Tontine Hotel. Harrigan sold the hotel, then containing sixty rooms, in 1911. The hotel burned on May 1, 1944, reducing it to a forty-room establishment. In 1968, the property was sold to make way for a Cottle's Super Market and was demolished.

== Gallery ==
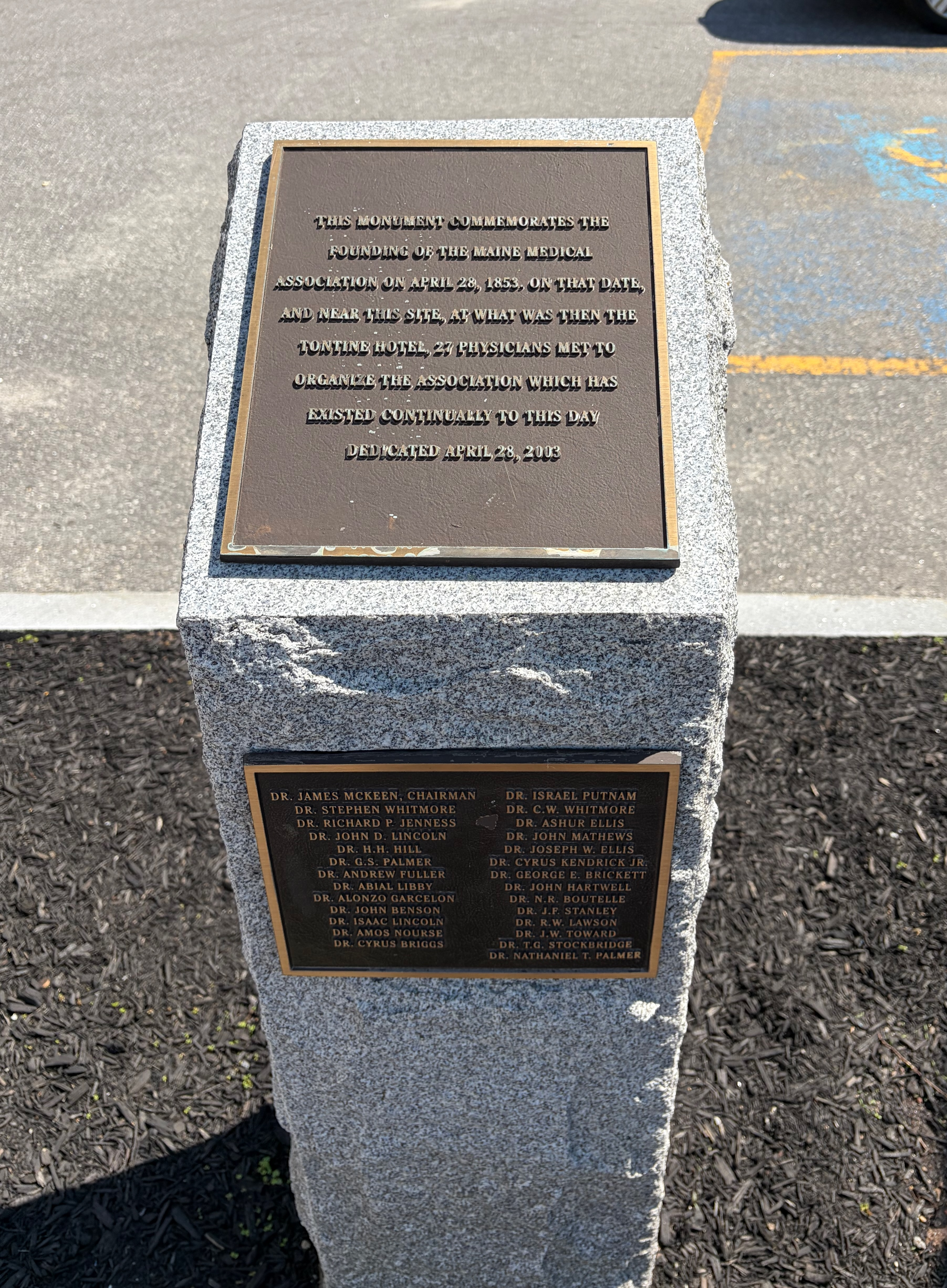
Plaque commemorating the establishment of the Maine Medical Association at the hotel in 1853
