= Parker Cleaveland House =

Historic house in Maine, United States

- U.S. National Register of Historic Places
- U.S. National Historic Landmark
- U.S. Historic district – Contributing property
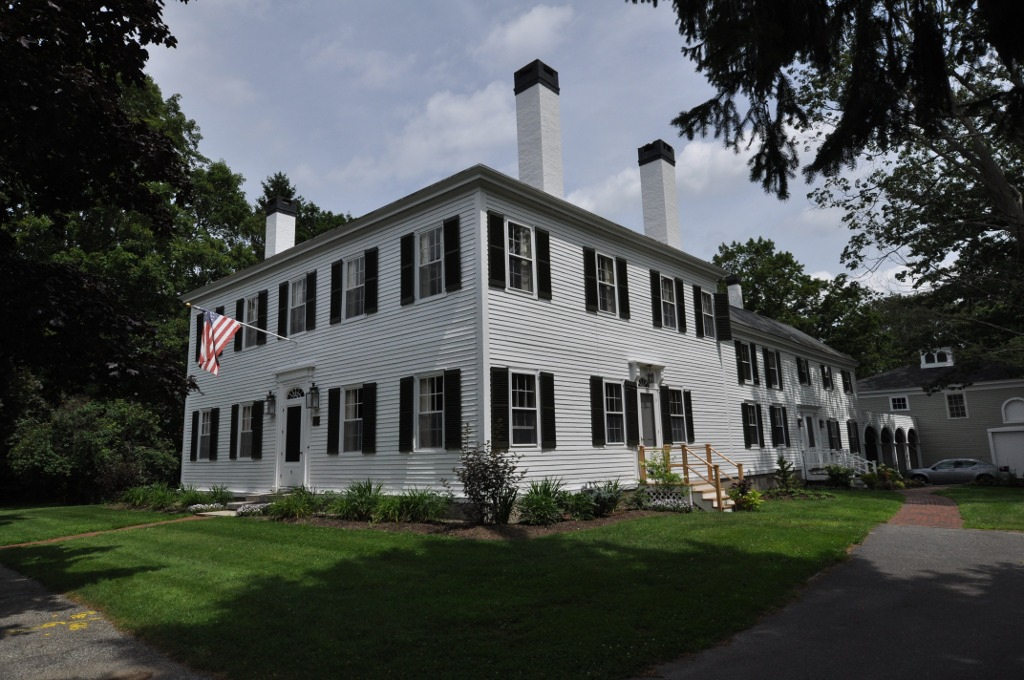

- Location within Maine Location within the United States
- Location: 75 Federal Street, Brunswick, Maine
- Coordinates: 43°54′37.83″N 69°57′35.77″W
- Area: less than one acre
- Architect: Samuel Melcher III
- Part of: Federal Street Historic District (ID76000092)
- NRHP reference No.: 00000702

Significant dates
- Added to NRHP: May 16, 2000
- Designated NHL: May 16, 2000
- Designated CP: October 29, 1976

The Parker Cleaveland House is a historic house at 75 Federal Street in Brunswick, Maine. It was the home, from 1806 to 1858, of Parker Cleaveland (1780–1858), a mineralogist and a professor at nearby Bowdoin College. While he was a professor at Bowdoin College, Cleaveland conducted some of the earliest studies of mineralogy in the United States. His 1816 work Elementary Treatise on Mineralogy and Geology, which included a volume on types and localities of American minerals, became the standard textbook on the subject in American higher education and the model for future mineralogy scholarship and publications.

The house was listed on the National Register of Historic Places and declared a National Historic Landmark in 2000 for its association with Cleaveland. It is now owned by Bowdoin College, and serves as the president's house.

== Description and history ==
The Cleaveland House is a two-story wood-frame structure with a hip roof and a granite foundation. It is a typical connected homestead, with a rear ell connected to a carriage house via an open garage. Its main facade, facing west, is five bays wide, with a center entrance flanked by pilasters and topped by a semi-elliptical fanlight louver and entablature with cornice. A secondary entrance on the south-facing facade has a small hood. The interior has fairly typical middle-class woodwork of the period, with the finest elements found in the central hall and the northwest parlor. The connecting ell is a 1950s-60s replacement for an older ell.

The house was built in 1805-06 by a local master builder, Samuel Melcher, for Parker Cleaveland, who had arrived in 1805 to begin his long career at Bowdoin College. The size and scope of the house eventually forced Cleaveland to sell the house to the college, which first leased it back to him, and then allowed him to live in it rent-free until his death in 1858. It was then purchased from the college by Cleaveland's son-in-law, Peleg Chandler, and it remained in the Chandler family until 1951. The house was reacquired by the college, and now serves as the official residence of its president.

Parker Cleaveland was born in Massachusetts, educated at Dummer Academy and Harvard College, and taught briefly at Harvard before he was hired by Bowdoin as a professor of math and natural philosophy. Cleaveland expanded the curriculum to include chemistry and mineralogy, and it is in this area that he made his greatest impact. Although he was not educated in the study of minerals, this became his major area of research, and in 1818 published his groundbreaking Elementary Treatise on Mineralogy and Geology, the first American volume on mineralogy, and the first published anywhere to include descriptions of North American specimens. His expanded second edition became an internationally recognized authority on the subject, and set the standard for later works on the subject.

His home, where he died in 1858, was listed on the National Register of Historic Places and designated a National Historic Landmark in 2000. The house is also a contributing resource to the Federal Street Historic District, an area of well-preserved 19th-century houses in Brunswick. Massachusetts Hall at Bowdoin College is also listed on the National Register in part because of its associations with Cleaveland.

== See also ==
- List of National Historic Landmarks in Maine
- National Register of Historic Places listings in Cumberland County, Maine
