= Indian Trail School =

Indian Trail School may refer to:

- Indian Trail Elementary School, Downers Grove, Illinois
- Indian Trail Junior High School, Addison, Illinois
- Indian Trail Elementary School, North Shore School District 112, Highland Park, Illinois
- Indian Trails Middle School, Romeoville, Illinois
- Indian Trail Elementary School, LaPorte, Indiana
- Indian Trail Middle School, Olathe School District, Olathe, Kansas
- Indian Trail Elementary School, a public school in Louisville, Kentucky
- Indian Trail Elementary School, Fort Osage R-1 School District, Independence, Missouri
- Indian Trail Elementary School, Indian Trail, North Carolina
- Indian Trail Elementary School, Stow-Munroe Falls City School District, Stow, Ohio
- Indian Trail Intermediate School, Johnson City, Tennessee
- Indian Trail Elementary School, Spokane Public Schools, Spokane, Washington
- Indian Trail High School and Academy, Kenosha, Wisconsin

== See also ==
- Indian Trail (disambiguation)
- Indian Trails Middle School (disambiguation)
