= Upper Mall =

Public park in Brunswick, Maine, U.S.

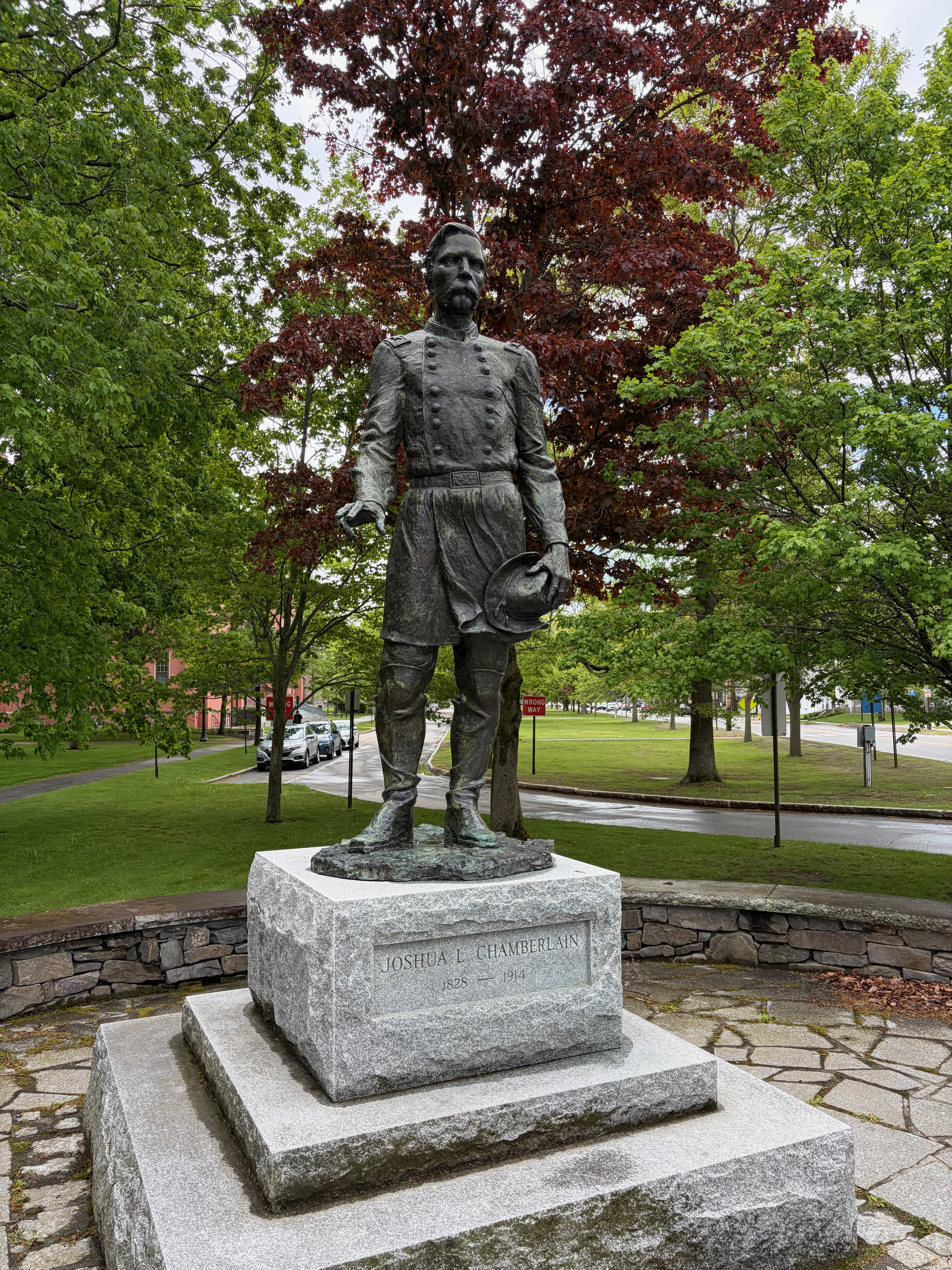
- A statue of Joshua Chamberlain stands directly across Maine Street from his former home, at the northern end of the mall
- Interactive map of Upper Mall
- Type: Urban park
- Location: Brunswick, Maine, U.S.
- Coordinates: 43.90745°N 69.96480°W
- Owner: Town of Brunswick

Upper Mall is an urban park in Brunswick, Maine, United States. It is located between Maine Street and Park Row, running from Bath Road in the north to Whittier Street in the south. It forms the western border of the Bowdoin College campus. A statue of Joshua Chamberlain, the sixth president of Bowdoin, stands at the mall's northern end. It was erected in 2003.

Lower Mall is also located between Maine Street and Park Row but closer to the downtown area.

== Gallery ==
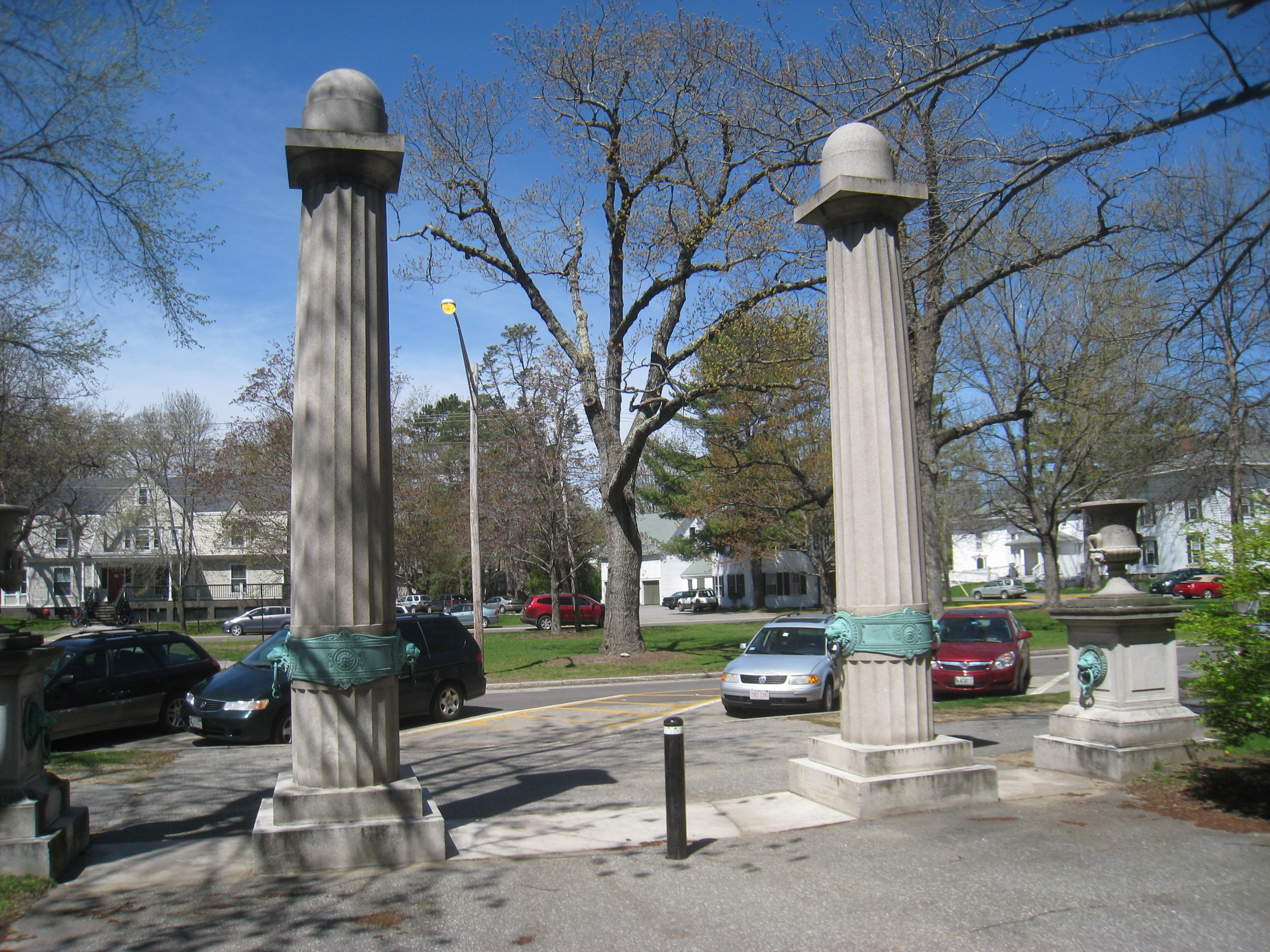
Part of the mall viewed from inside the Class of 1875 Gate at Bowdoin College (2010)
