= Dendrotettix australis =

Scientific classification
- Kingdom: Animalia
- Phylum: Arthropoda
- Clade: Pancrustacea
- Class: Insecta
- Order: Orthoptera
- Suborder: Caelifera
- Family: Acrididae
- Subfamily: Melanoplinae
- Tribe: Podismini
- Genus: Dendrotettix
- Species: D. australis

Binomial name
- Dendrotettix australis (Morse, 1907)

Species of grasshopper

Dendrotettix australis, the scrub pine grasshopper, is a species of spur-throated grasshopper in the family Acrididae. It is found in North America.
