= Alpheus Spring Packard Sr. =

American academic (1798–1884)

Alpheus Spring Packard
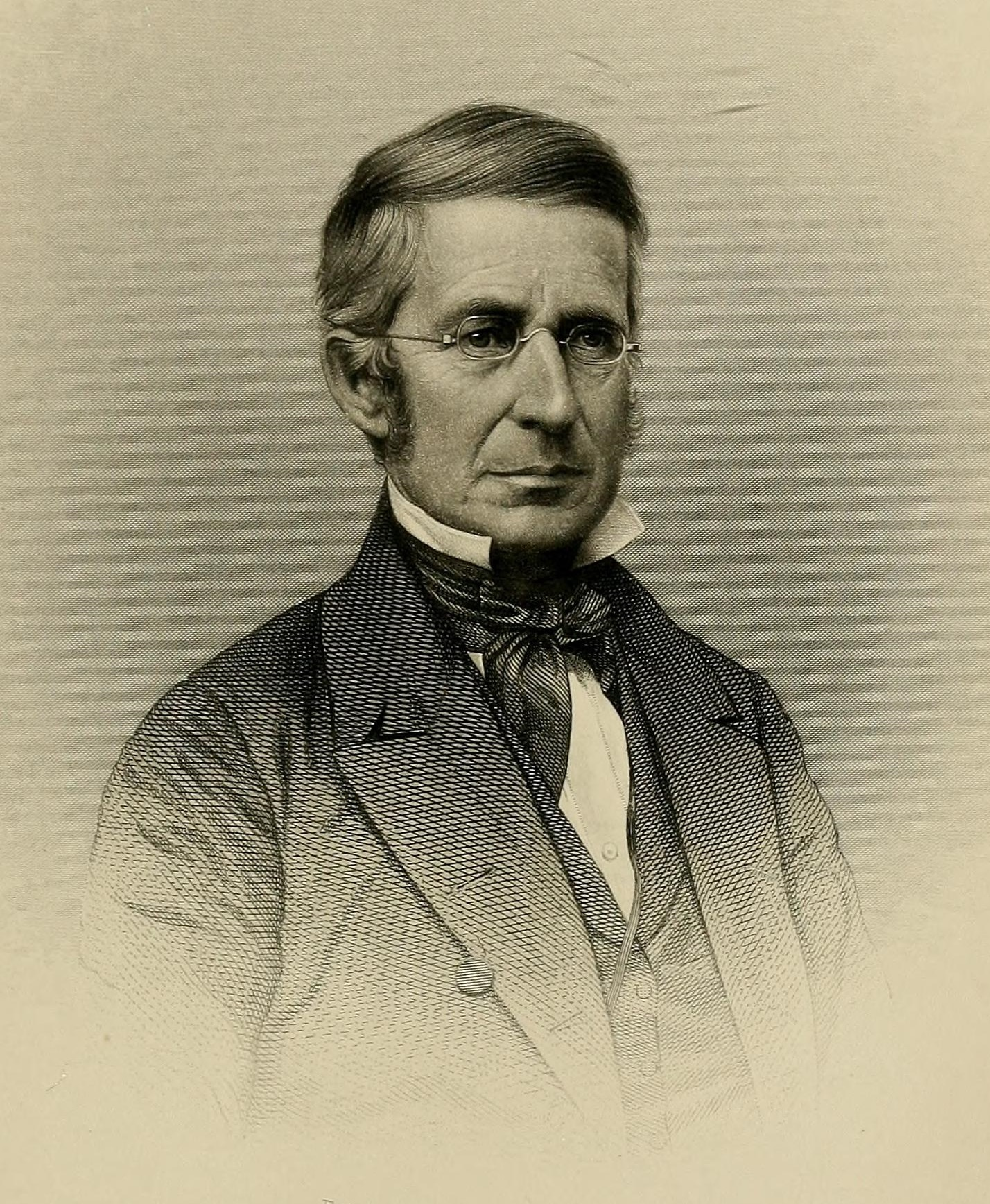
- Born: December 23, 1798; Chelmsford, Massachusetts
- Died: July 13, 1884 (aged 85); Squirrel Island, Maine
- Education: Phillips Exeter Academy; Bowdoin College
- Children: William Alfred Packard; Alpheus Spring Packard Jr.

Alpheus Spring Packard (December 23, 1798 – July 13, 1884) was an American academic who was a professor for more than 40 years at Bowdoin College. Trained as a minister, he was an educator, librarian, and acting President of Bowdoin College for the year 1883–84 until his death (between the Chamberlain and Hyde administrations). He was the father of four sons and one daughter by his first wife: Alpheus Spring Packard Jr. (1839–1905), Bowdoin class of 1861, Civil War surgeon, entomologist who corresponded with Darwin, and a professor at Brown University with 25 publications; William Alfred Packard (1830–1909), Bowdoin class of 1851; Charles A. Packard, Bowdoin class of 1848; George Packard; and Frances Appleton.

== Biography ==
He was born on December 23, 1798, in Chelmsford, Massachusetts. He attended Phillips Exeter Academy. He graduated from Bowdoin College in 1816.

Packard was the son-in-law of Bowdoin College's second president, the Reverend Jesse Appleton, through his first marriage to Frances Appleton (1804–1839). Packard married Mrs. C. W. McLellan after his wife's death and produced a fifth son, Robert L. Packard, who graduated from Bowdoin in 1868.

Packard was a key figure in the Maine Historical Society from its founding in 1822 until his death in 1884. He was also a prominent member of the Peucinian Society.

Packard had a long-standing relationship with Bowdoin College. He remained there for the remainder of his life, first as a tutor (1819–1824), and then as a professor of ancient language and classical literature (1824–1865). During the last two years of his life, he was acting president of the college. The Bowdoin College George Mitchell Special Collections department lists thirteen publications. Among them, he edited and was joint author (with Nehemiah Cleaveland) of The History of Bowdoin College, with Biographical Sketches of its Graduates (1882); he also edited Works of the Rev. Jesse Appleton, with a memoir (1836–1837); and Xenophon's Memorabilia of Socrates, with English Notes (1839; third edition, 1843).

To commemorate Packard's 65 years of service to Bowdoin College, the Alpheus Spring Packard Gateway was built on the pathway of College Avenue between Coles Tower and the main quad. He is interred at Pine Grove Cemetery in Brunswick.

He died on July 13, 1884, in Squirrel Island, Maine.

== Residence ==
The Bowdoin College Russwurm African American Center located at 6 College St. in Brunswick, Maine was originally built in 1827 for Packard, who in 1836 sold half to William Smyth, professor of mathematics. For the next 35 years, the house was known as the Packard–Smyth House. The house has also been known as the Mitchell–Little house (after subsequent owners).
