= Federal Street Historic District =

Historic district in Maine, United States

- U.S. National Register of Historic Places
- U.S. Historic district
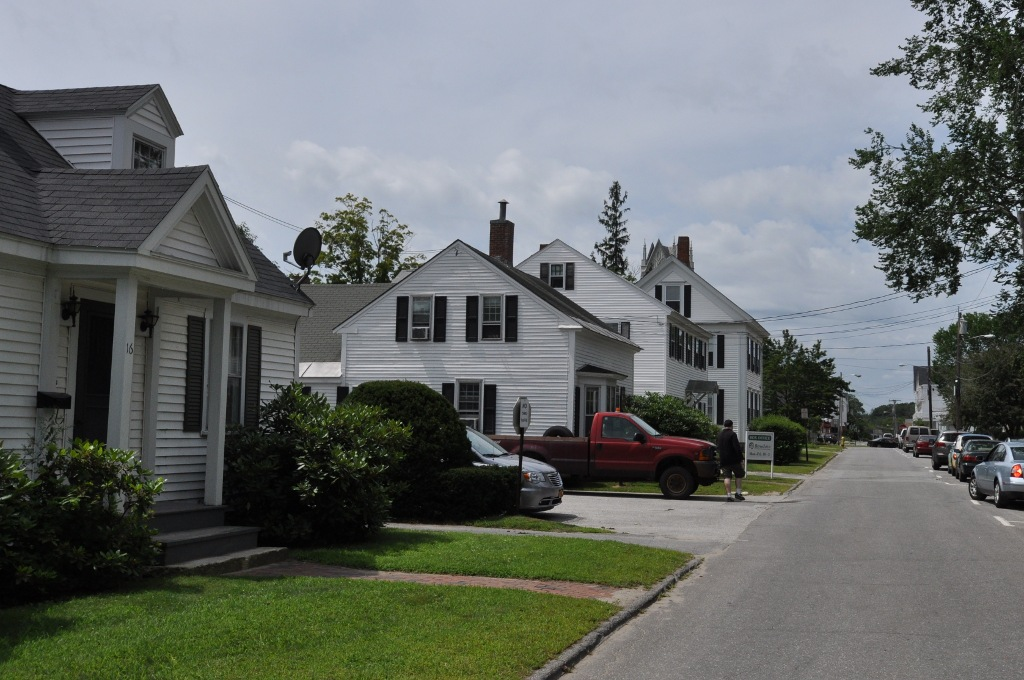
- A view of Cleaveland Street in the district

- Location within Maine Location within the United States
- Location: Roughly bounded by Mason, Maine, College, and Federal Sts., Brunswick, Maine
- Coordinates: 43°54′45″N 69°57′45″W
- Area: 65 acres (26 ha)
- Architect: Multiple
- Architectural style: Colonial Revival, Federal, Greek Revival
- NRHP reference No.: 76000092
- Added to NRHP: October 29, 1976

The Federal Street Historic District of Brunswick, Maine, encompasses a part of the town whose development was influenced by its 18th-century success as a shipping center, and by the presence of Bowdoin College (chartered 1794), whose historic central campus is part of the district. In addition to the campus, the district includes a series of relatively high-style Federal and later-period houses along Federal Street and Maine Street, which join the campus to downtown Brunswick. The district was listed on the National Register of Historic Places in 1976.

== Description and history ==
The town of Brunswick was chartered in 1737, and was initially powered economically by mills along the Androscoggin River, and by maritime trade. Bowdoin College was chartered in 1794, and its first buildings constructed on the campus south of the town center in 1799 and 1808. The town's maritime economy was devastated by the Embargo of 1807, and the college assumed a more prominent role. The college campus is joined to the downtown by Maine Street, which runs through downtown Brunswick south, and was the area's first major road (1717), and Federal Street, laid out roughly parallel to the east of Maine Street in 1803. Federal Street rapidly became a fashionable residential area, with high-style houses lining it and adjacent cross streets connecting it to Maine Street. In 1826 a swamp along Maine Street was filled in to form a park, Lower Mall, bounded on the east by Park Row, which was also developed with high style housing. The college extended the idea of the Park Row mall along the western edge of its campus.

The historic district encompasses the traditional heart of the Bowdoin campus, bounded by Maine and College Streets on the west and south, Silas Drive on the East, and Bath Road to the north. It then extends northward along Park Row and Federal Street to School Street, from which it continues north on Federal Street to Mason Street. Most of the buildings in the district are residential, and the most commonly-seen architectural styles are Federal, Greek Revival, and Colonial Revival, although other 19th and early 20th-century revival styles are also represented. Notable non-academic buildings in the district include the prominently-placed First Parish Church of Richard Upjohn, the architecturally significant Gothic Revival Henry Boody House on Maine Street, and the historically significant Parker Cleaveland House (now the official residence of the Bowdoin president) and the Harriet Beecher Stowe House. Campus buildings in the district include Massachusetts Hall, its first building, and the Walker Art Gallery, among others.

== See also ==
- National Register of Historic Places listings in Cumberland County, Maine
