= Dendrotettix =

Scientific classification
- Kingdom: Animalia
- Phylum: Arthropoda
- Clade: Pancrustacea
- Class: Insecta
- Order: Orthoptera
- Suborder: Caelifera
- Family: Acrididae
- Subfamily: Melanoplinae
- Tribe: Podismini
- Genus: Dendrotettix; Packard, 1890

Genus of grasshoppers

Dendrotettix is a genus of spur-throated grasshoppers in the family Acrididae. There are at least three described species in Dendrotettix.

== Species ==
These three species belong to the genus Dendrotettix:

- Dendrotettix australis (Morse, 1907)^{i c g b} (scrub pine grasshopper)
- Dendrotettix quercus Packard, 1890^{i c g b} (post oak grasshopper)
- Dendrotettix zimmermanni (Saussure, 1861)^{i c g b} (Carolina oak grasshopper)

Data sources: i = ITIS, c = Catalogue of Life, g = GBIF, b = Bugguide.net
