= Parker Cleaveland =

American geologist and mineralogist

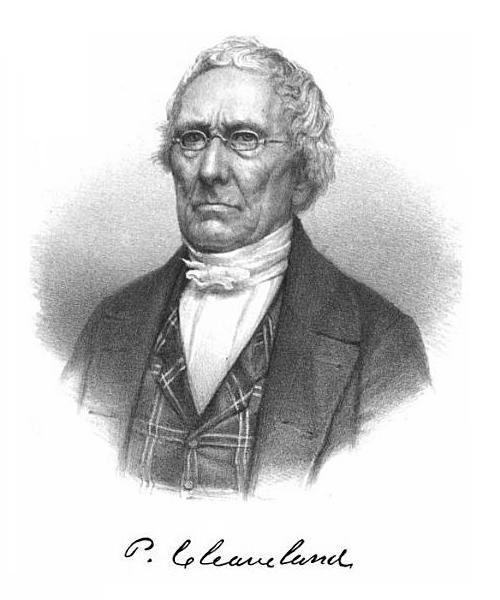
- Born: January 15, 1780; Rowley, Massachusetts, US
- Died: August 15, 1858 (aged 78); Brunswick, Maine, United States
- Education: Harvard University
- Known for: Published a treatise on Mineralogy and Geology
- Scientific career
- Fields: Chemistry, Mathematics, Philosophy
- Workplaces: Bowdoin College

Parker Cleaveland (January 1, 1780 – August 15, 1858) was an American geologist and mineralogist, born in Rowley, Massachusetts.

He was identified with the early progress of the natural sciences. After having attending the Dummer Academy in Byfield, Massachusetts, he graduated from Harvard in 1799, was tutor in mathematics there from 1803 to 1805, was chosen professor of mathematics and natural philosophy and lecturer on chemistry and mineralogy in Bowdoin College, a position which he retained until his death, although many professorships in other colleges and the presidency of his own were offered to him. He was elected an Associate Fellow of the American Academy of Arts and Sciences in 1809 and to the American Philosophical Society in 1818.

He gathered a valuable collection of minerals and published a treatise on Mineralogy and Geology (1816; third edition, 1856), which earned for him the title "Father of American Mineralogy."

Peleg Chandler was his son-in-law and funded the renovation of Massachusetts Hall, Bowdoin College in 1872 after graduating from Bowdoin in 1834.

== See also ==
- Parker Cleaveland House
