= Pine Grove Cemetery (Brunswick, Maine) =

Coordinates: 43°54′33″N 69°57′26″W

Pine Grove Cemetery is a cemetery in Brunswick, Maine, United States. The land used to establish the cemetery was deeded by nearby Bowdoin College in 1820.

== Burials ==
- Jesse Appleton
- Felix A. Burton
- Joshua Chamberlain
- Joseph McKeen
- Alpheus Spring Packard Sr.
- William Smyth
