= Maquoit Bay =

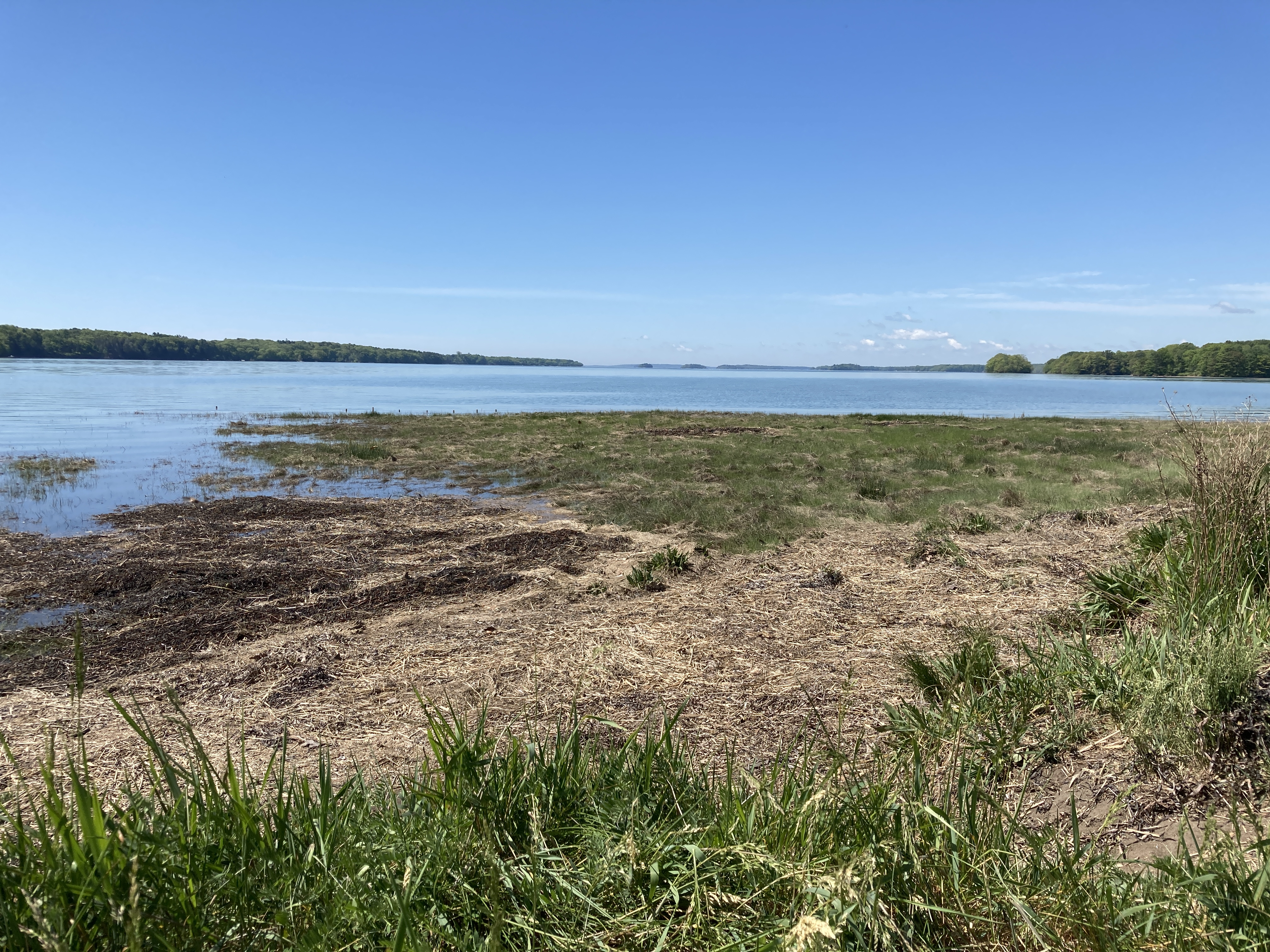
- Looking southwest from the head of Maquoit Bay towards the islands off South Freeport

- Location of Maquoit Bay in Maine
- Location: Maine, United States
- Coordinates: 43.85993°N 69.99981°W
- Type: Bay
- Part of: Casco Bay
- Ocean/sea sources: Atlantic Ocean

Maquoit Bay is a bay in Cumberland County, Maine, in the northern part of Casco Bay. It is located between South Freeport and Mere Point, Brunswick, and is a Focus Area of Statewide Ecological Significance and one of the state's Important Bird Areas.

The mouth of Maquoit Bay faces southwest, which results in its becoming a receptacle for nutrients flowing in from Casco Bay. The mixing of these nutrients with the organic material of the bay's salt marshes, a process assisted by the tides and the confluences of surrounding watercourses, creates a rich environment for marine life.

On top of the large amounts of shellfish, the bay is also home to thousands of waterfowl, wading birds and shorebirds all year round. Shorebirds, in particular, undertake complete annual migration round trips of up to 20,000 miles (32,000 km), taking them to nesting areas in the Arctic and winter homes in South America, and many hundreds of them stop in Maquoit Bay to rest for the next leg of their journey.

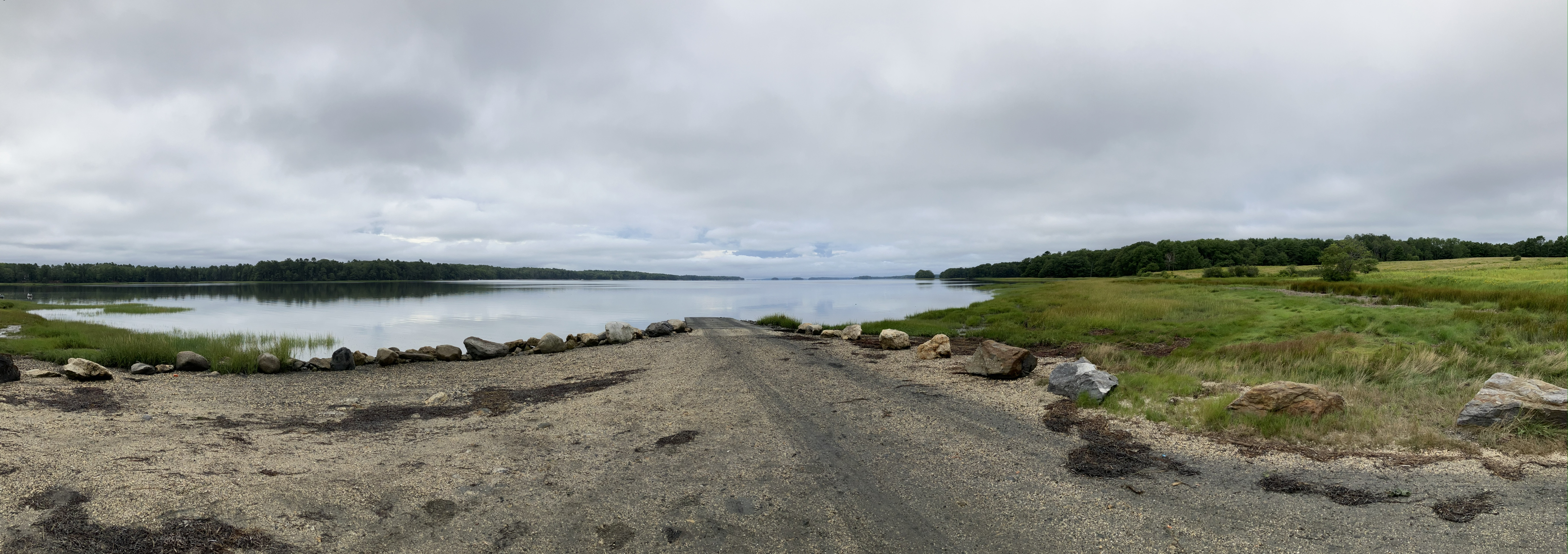
Panoramic view of Maquoit Bay from Wharton Point (2022)

== Wharton Point ==
Wharton Point is a popular location for clam and shellfish harvesting. There is also a boat ramp.

The point is named for Thomas Wharton, an early settler in Brunswick, c. 1684. He owned the lot in 1717. It was later sold to William Woodside, for whom the road it stands beside is named. (Woodside Road and Maquoit Road merge at the apex of the tight turn in the road.)

It is the southern terminus of "12 Rod Road", and served as an access point for vessels delivering and shipping lumber and farm products. Prior to its settlement, it was used by Native Americans for cartage between the sharp bend of the Androscoggin River in Brunswick and Maquoit Bay. During the Indian Wars of the 18th century, a garrison and company of soldiers were stationed here to keep communication lines open between Fort George and Maquoit Bay.

In 2020, Wharton Point was one of two sites in Brunswick selected as a test location for a shoreline study. Lasting five years, the study will explore the impact of using naturally found materials, such as oyster shells and downed trees, in reducing the effects of erosion.

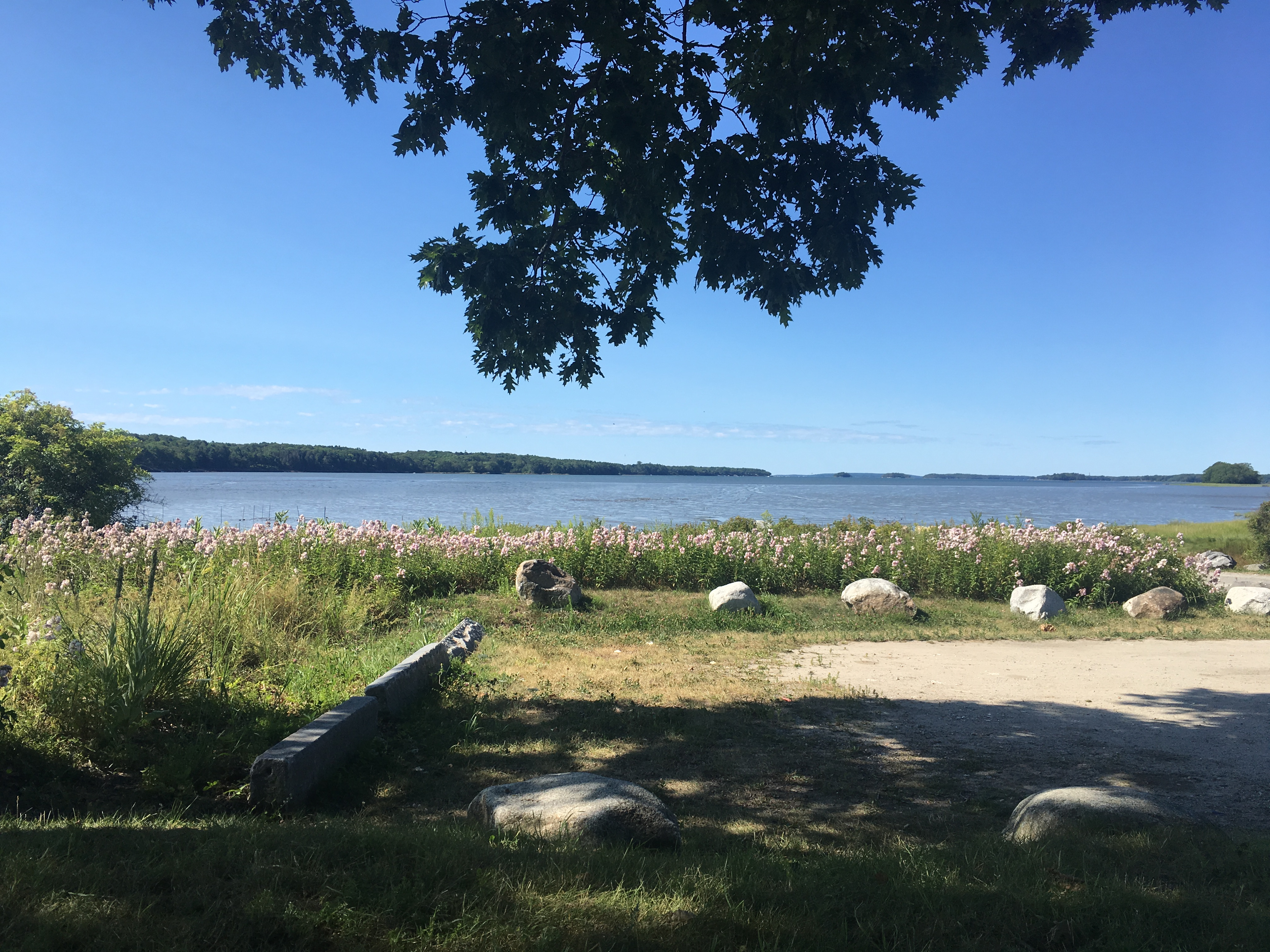
The parking area to the northeast of the boat ramp, looking out into the bay over Gamble Marsh
