= Lower Mall =

Public park in Brunswick, Maine, U.S.

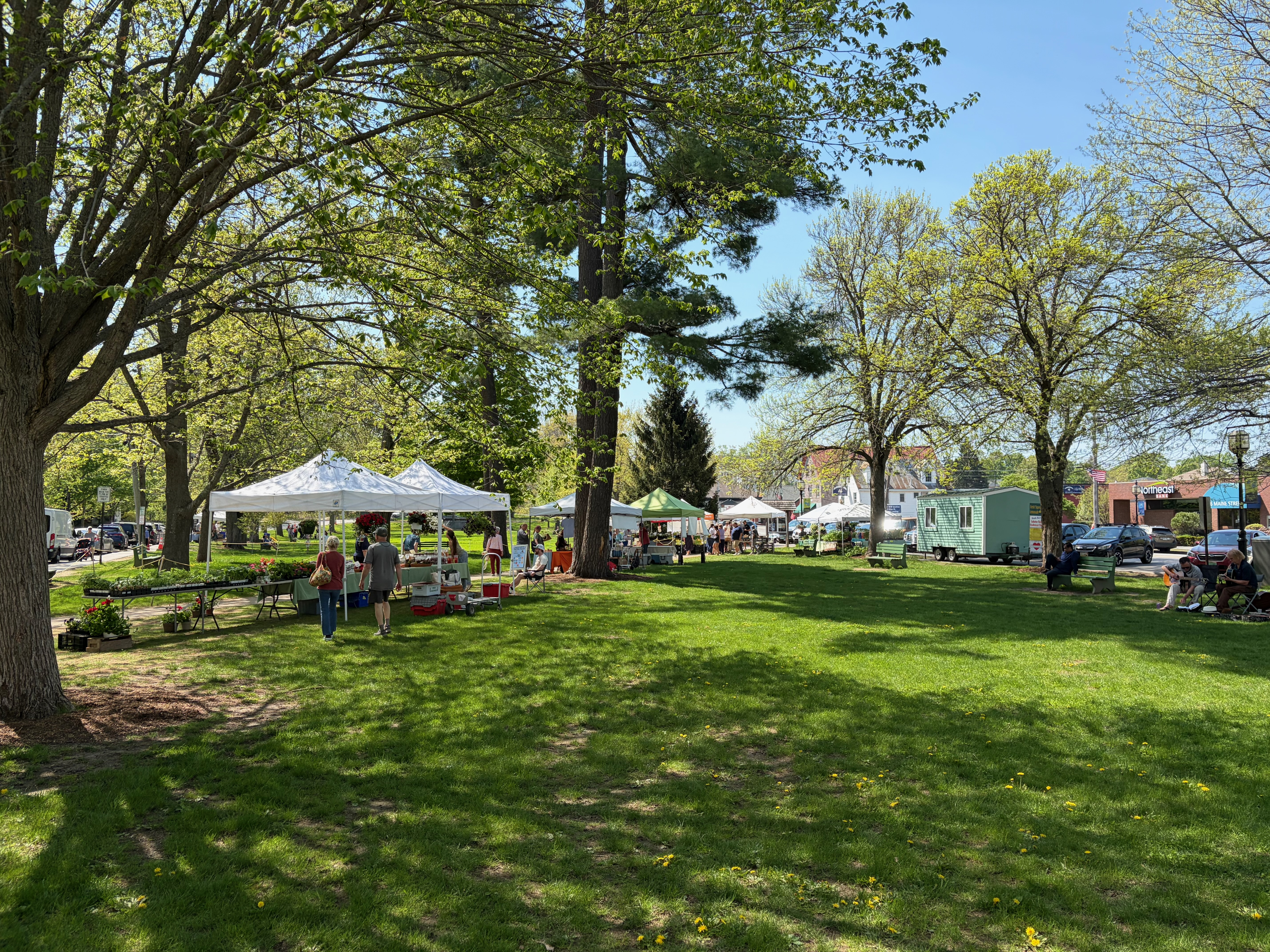
- Pictured in 2026, during the farmers' market
- Interactive map of Lower Mall
- Type: Urban park
- Location: Brunswick, Maine, U.S.
- Coordinates: 43.913532°N 69.964046°W
- Created: 1823 (203 years ago)
- Owner: Town of Brunswick
- Open: Dawn to dusk daily

Lower Mall is an urban park in Brunswick, Maine, United States. Established in 1823, it is located in the Federal Street Historic District, between Maine Street and Park Row, running from School Street in the north to Bath Road in the south. Veterans Plaza, a grouping of monuments honoring the town's veterans, stands at the park's northern end. There is also a gazebo at the park's southern end. The Skolfield-Whittier House, home of the Pejepscot Historical Society, stands on Park Row.

In 1823, the land for this park―which was originally swampy―was sold to the town for "five cents" by three citizens with the stipulation that it be "reserved and used as a public walk or mall." The swamp was filled shortly thereafter.

In 2019, there were plans to make Park Row a one-way street, from north to south, to facilitate the growing popularity of the town's farmers' market, which is held in the park.

Just beyond the park's southern edge, the Rockland Branch of the Cumberland and Knox Railroad crosses Park Row.

Upper Mall is also located between Maine Street and Park Row but adjacent to Bowdoin College, a few hundred feet to the south.

== Gallery ==
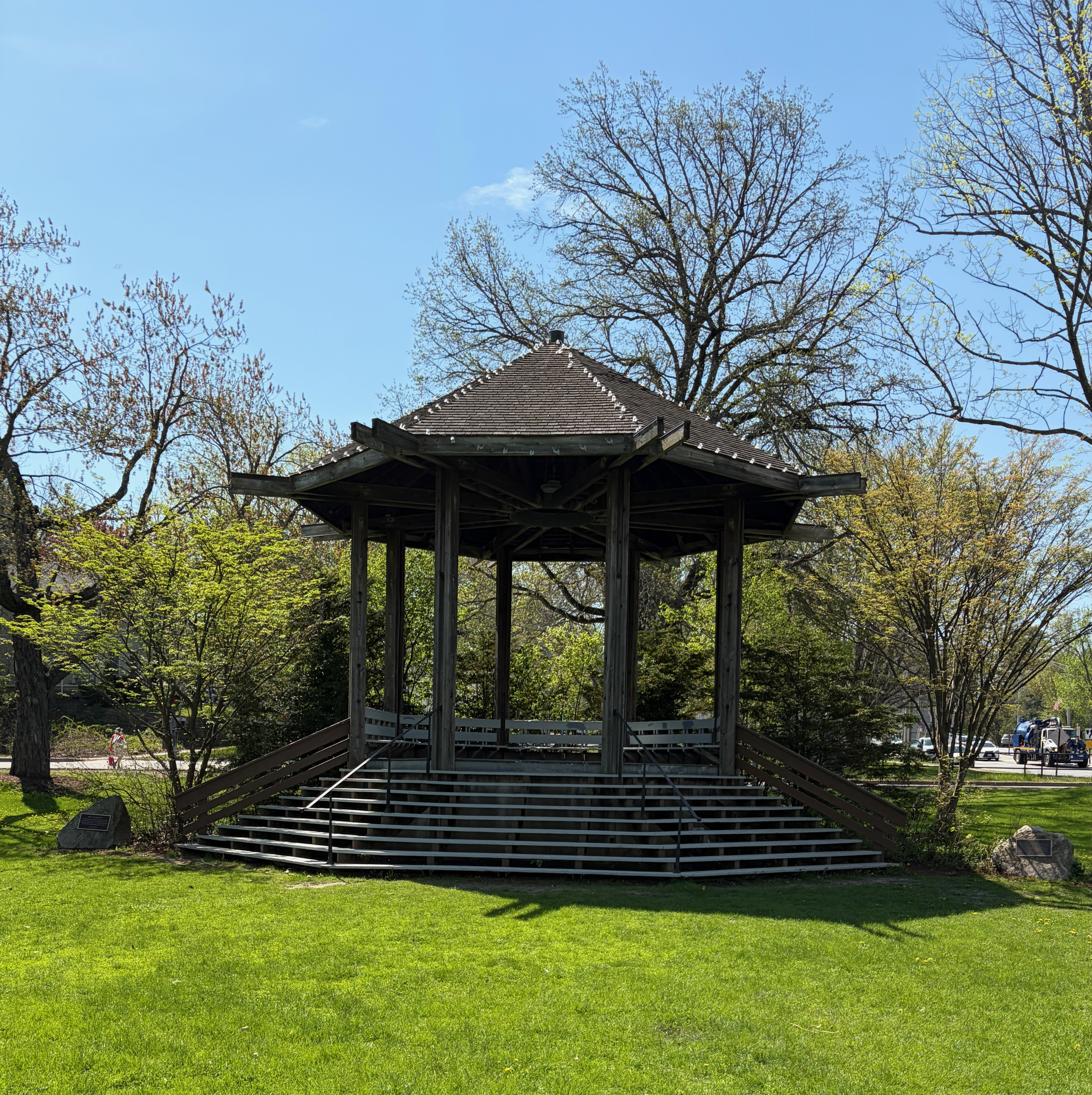
Gazebo

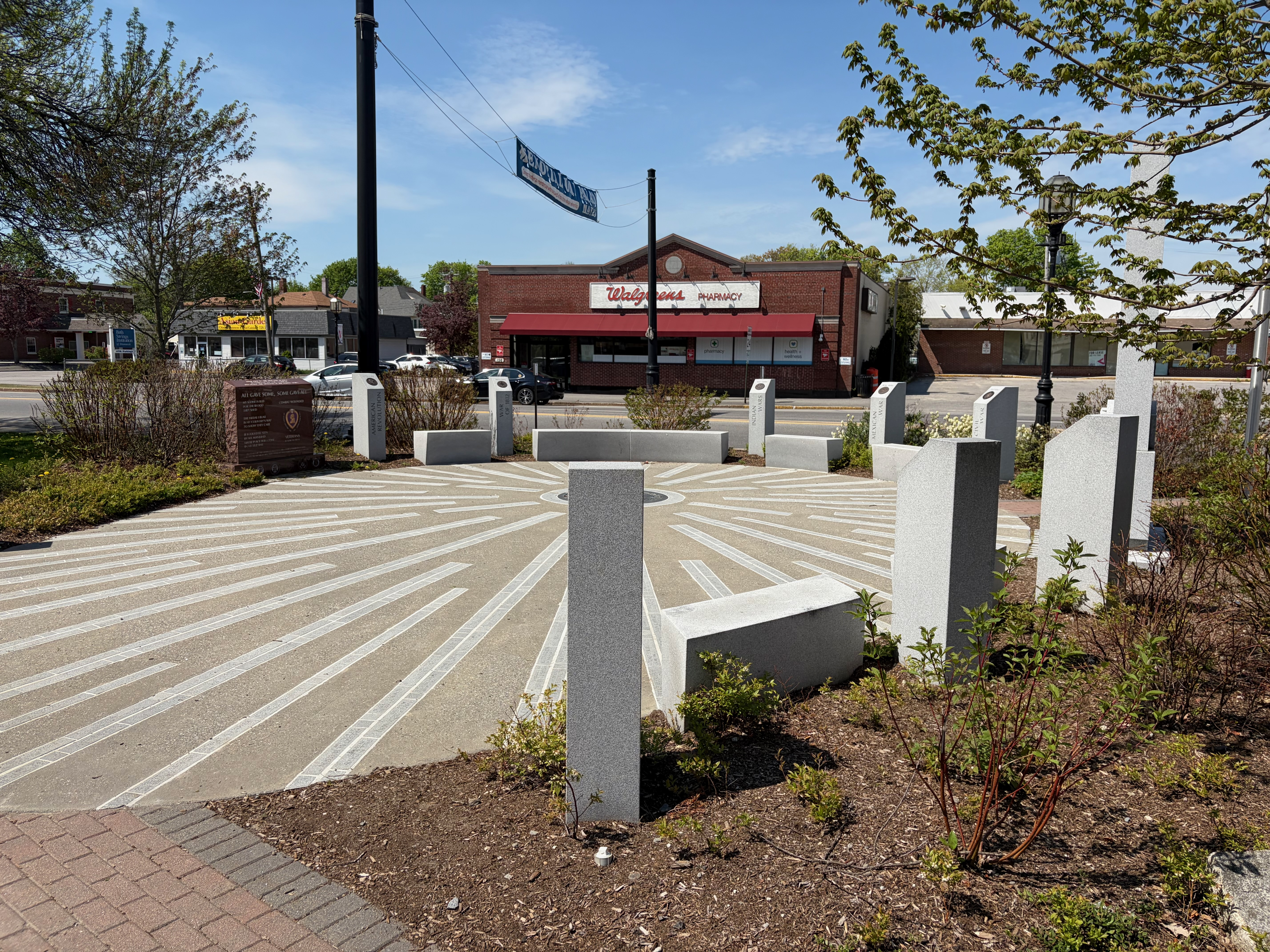
Veterans Plaza, looking south to Maine Street
