= Dendrotettix zimmermanni =

Scientific classification
- Kingdom: Animalia
- Phylum: Arthropoda
- Clade: Pancrustacea
- Class: Insecta
- Order: Orthoptera
- Suborder: Caelifera
- Family: Acrididae
- Subfamily: Melanoplinae
- Tribe: Podismini
- Genus: Dendrotettix
- Species: D. zimmermanni

Binomial name
- Dendrotettix zimmermanni (Saussure, 1861)

Species of grasshopper

Dendrotettix zimmermanni, the Carolina oak grasshopper, is a species of spur-throated grasshopper in the family Acrididae. It is found in North America.
