= James M. Bates =

American physician (1827–1911)

- Bates around the turn of the 20th century
- Born: May 31, 1827
- Died: July 9, 1911 (aged 84); Yarmouth, Maine, U.S.
- Resting place: Riverside Cemetery, Yarmouth, Maine
- Occupation: Physician
- Board member of: Maine Medical Association; North Yarmouth Academy
- Spouse: Hester Ann Sawtelle

James M. Bates (May 31, 1827 – July 9, 1911) was an American physician. He became an army surgeon during the American Civil War and president of the Maine Medical Association.

== Life and career ==
Bates was born on May 31, 1827. His father, James Bates, was also a physician.

He graduated from Jefferson Medical College in 1851, after which he moved to Yarmouth, Maine, where he worked for several years alongside his father.

After serving "with distinction" as an army surgeon during the Civil War, he became a member of the W. L. Haskell Post, number 108, G. A. R.

Bates became president of the Maine Medical Association, as well as a trustee of the State Reform School.

He was, for over three decades, a member of the Yarmouth school board and a trustee of North Yarmouth Academy.

== Personal life ==
Bates married Hester Ann Sawtelle. They had five known children, including Hester Bates, who went on to become a physician.

He was an active member of the Central Unitarian Society, and was also its treasurer.

== Death ==
Bates died on July 9, 1911, aged 84. He is interred in Yarmouth's Riverside Cemetery, alongside his wife, who survived him by two years.
