= Felix A. Burton =

American architect

- Born: August 4, 1885
- Died: November 28, 1949 (aged 64)
- Occupation: Architect

Felix Arnold Burton (August 4, 1885 – November 28, 1949) was an American architect. He designed around forty buildings in Brunswick, Maine, and also worked in Montana, Oregon, New York and Massachusetts.

== Early life ==
Burton was born in Millis, Massachusetts, in 1885, to Alfred Edgar Burton and Gertrude Hitz. He was the great-grandson of John Rogers Larrabee, a 19th-century housewright in Brunswick, Maine.

He attended Bowdoin College in Brunswick (graduating in 1907), before obtaining bachelor's and master's degrees in architecture from MIT in 1909 and 1911.

== Personal life ==
Returning to the United States after studying in Europe, Burton married Helen Lancaster Eaton in 1911. Eaton was the daughter of Brunswick industrialist Russell W. Eaton. The couple lived at 17 Federal Street in Brunswick. The following year, the couple moved to Helena, Montana, where Burton had taken a job with G. H. Carsley. They moved to Portland, Oregon, around a year later. There, Burton worked for architect Albert E. Doyle. After brief stints in New York and Brunswick, Maine, in 1914, he settled in Massachusetts.

They had one known child, daughter Alice, in 1915.

== Career ==
MIT's Technology Architectural Record listed Burton's achievements at the school, alongside his association with Boston architectural firm Allen & Collens and prizes he won.

== Death ==
Burton died in 1949, aged 64. He was interred in Brunswick's Pine Grove Cemetery. His widow survived him by 22 years and was buried beside him.
