= William Alfred Packard =

American classical scholar (1830–1909)

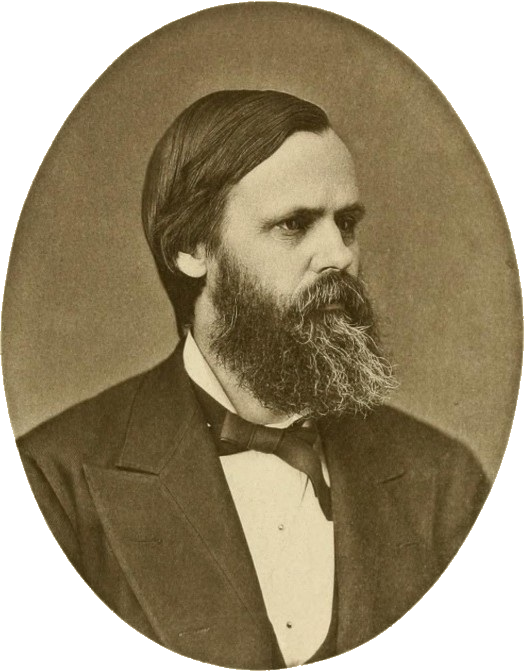
- William A. Packard in 1879
- Born: August 26, 1830; Brunswick, Maine
- Died: December 2, 1909 (aged 79); Squirrel Island, Maine
- Education: Phillips Academy
- Occupation: scholar

William Alfred Packard (August 26, 1830 – December 2, 1909) was an American classical scholar, born at Brunswick, Maine. He was the son of the educator, Alpheus Spring Packard, Sr., and the brother of entomologist Alpheus Spring Packard. He attended Phillips Academy, Andover and graduated at Bowdoin in 1851, studied at the University of Göttingen in 1857–58, taught at Dartmouth College 1860–70 and then became a professor at Princeton. He wrote for the Presbyterian Review and the Princeton Review. He died of heart disease in Princeton, New Jersey.
