= Joseph McKeen =

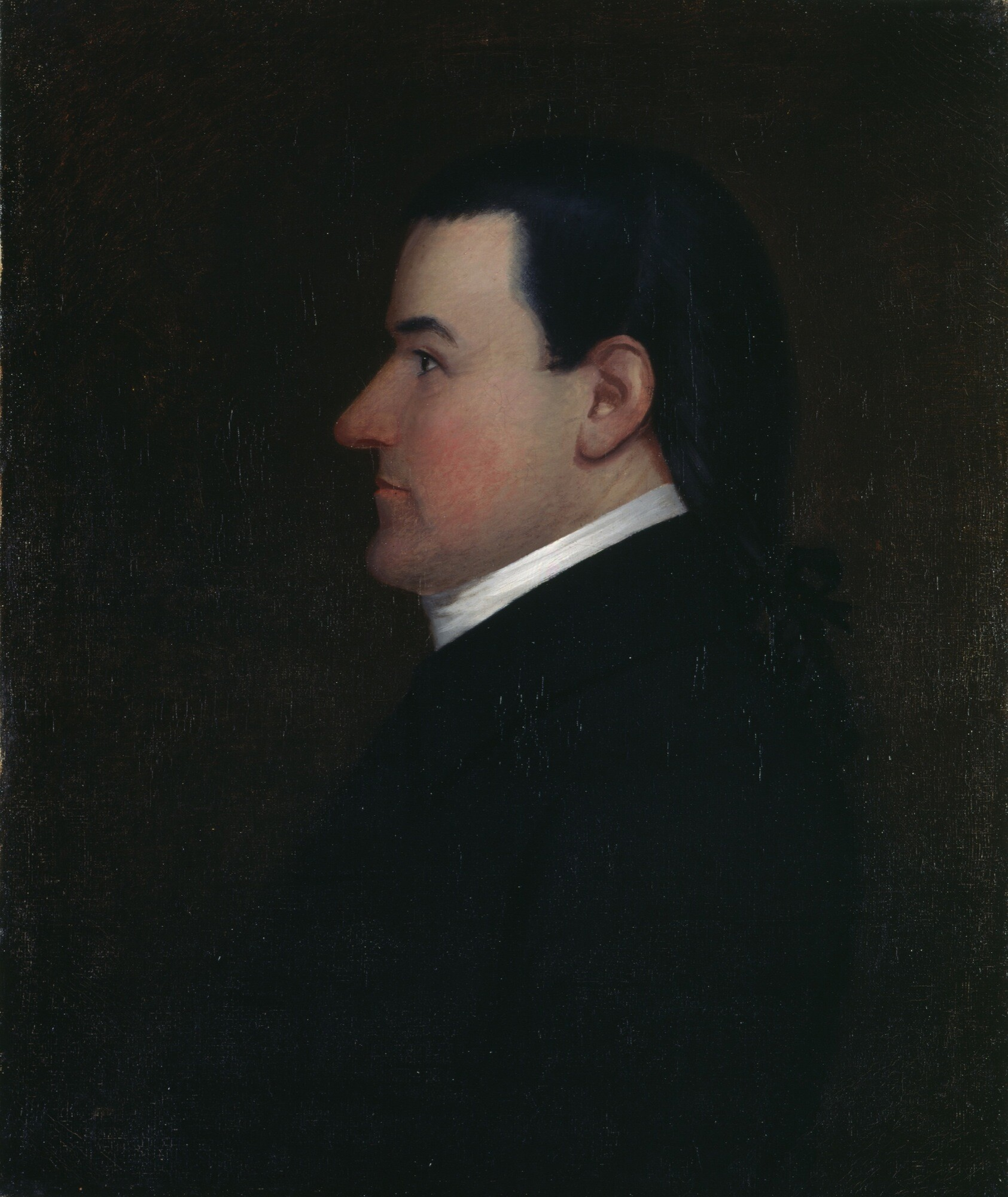

1st President of Bowdoin College
- In office 1802–1807
- Preceded by: Position established
- Succeeded by: Jesse Appleton

Personal details
- Born: October 15, 1757 Londonderry, New Hampshire
- Died: July 15, 1807 (aged 49) Brunswick, Maine
- Education: Dartmouth College

Joseph McKeen (October 15, 1757 – July 15, 1807) was the first president of Bowdoin College in Brunswick, Maine.

== Life and career ==
McKeen was born in Londonderry, New Hampshire, a town that his father and grandfather, John and James, who had come from the north of Ireland in 1718 to escape religious and political oppression, had helped to settle. He graduated from Dartmouth College in 1774 when he was just seventeen years old. Except for a brief period when he fought under General John Sullivan in the American Revolution, he taught school in Londonderry until he became the Congregational minister of Beverly, Massachusetts in 1785. He was elected a Fellow of the American Academy of Arts and Sciences in 1796.

He remained in that position as minister until 1802, when he became president of Bowdoin. At the time, Massachusetts Hall was the only building available for officers and pupils on campus. In his inaugural address, he famously said that "Literary institutions are founded and endowed for the common good, and not for the private advantage of those who resort to them for education." Bowdoin's annual Common Good Day for community service refers to this statement. He remained president until his death in 1807.

He received a Doctor of Divinity degree from Dartmouth in 1803. Most of McKeen's publications were papers in theTransactions of the American Academy of Arts and Science and some occasional sermons.

He is buried at Pine Grove Cemetery in Brunswick.

== Legacy ==
Bowdoin College inaugurated the Joseph McKeen Center for the Common Good in September 2008. The center provides programs for students, faculty, and staff to engage with the community through volunteerism, community-based teaching and research, and summer and post-graduate internships and fellowships. A large plaque that quotes a portion of McKeen's inaugural address is displayed in the center's hallway.

A collection of McKeen's sermons given to the college at chapel services was published in 2011. The collection is titled "Sober Consent of the Heart. The Bowdoin College Chapel Messages of its First President, Joseph McKeen, D.D., Delivered 1802-1806". It was compiled and edited by Robert B. Gregory.

The "Joseph and Alice McKeen Study Center" was established off of the Bowdoin College campus by the Christian Fellowship at Bowdoin. Meetings are held twice weekly.

Preceded by N/A	President of Bowdoin College; 1802–07	Succeeded by Jesse Appleton
