= Indian Trails Council =

Indian Trails Council may be:

- Indian Trails Council (Wisconsin)
- Indian Trails Council (Connecticut)
