= First Parish Church (Brunswick, Maine) =

Historic church in Maine, United States

- U.S. National Register of Historic Places
- U.S. Historic district – Contributing property
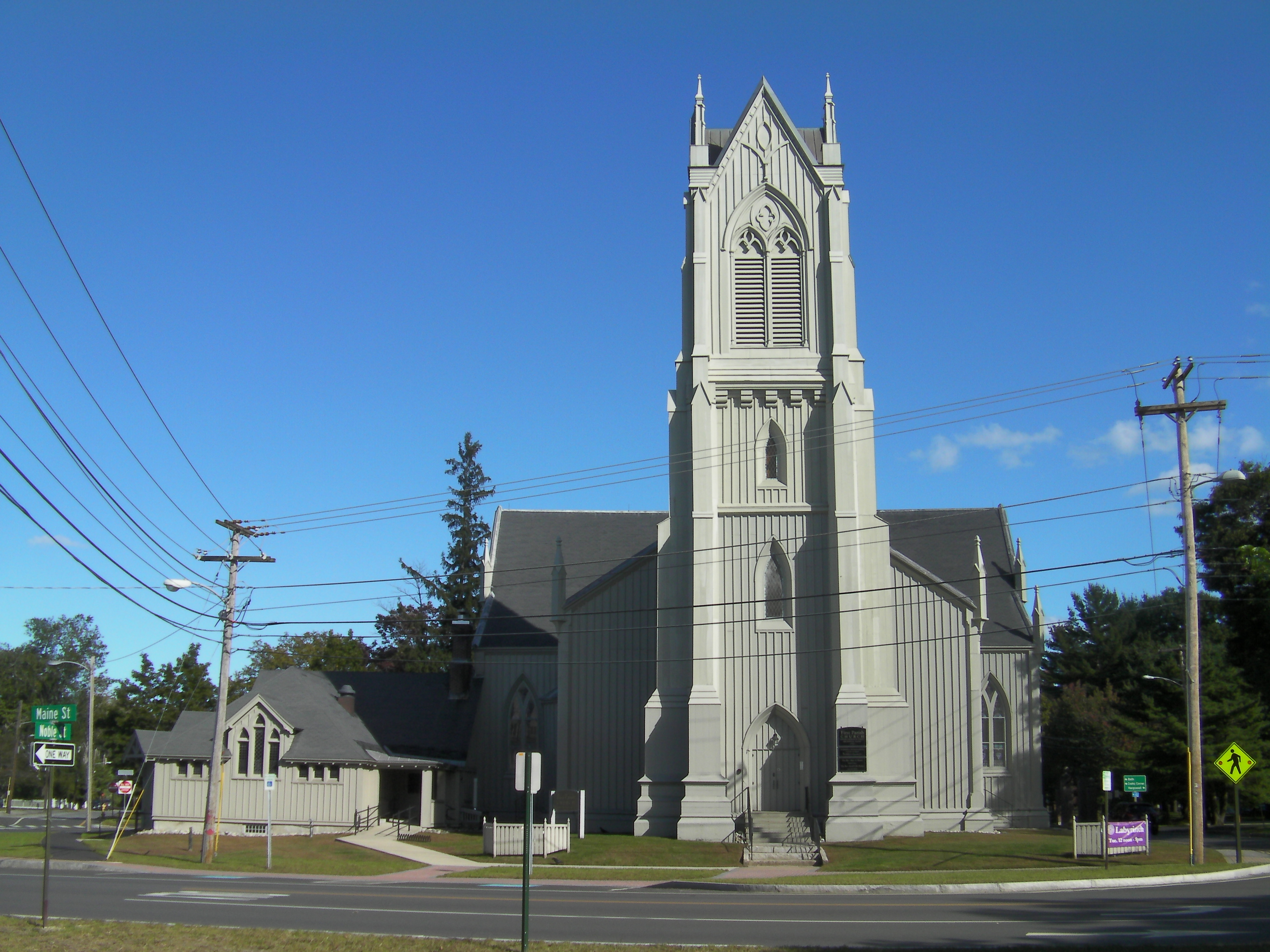

- Location within Maine Location within the United States
- Location: 217 Maine Street, Brunswick, Maine
- Coordinates: 43°54′38″N 69°57′47″W
- Area: less than one acre
- Built: 1845
- Architect: Richard Upjohn
- Architectural style: Gothic Revival
- Part of: Federal Street Historic District (ID76000092)
- NRHP reference No.: 69000008

Significant dates
- Added to NRHP: December 02, 1969
- Designated CP: October 29, 1976

The First Parish Church is an Open and Affirming congregation of the United Church of Christ. The church meetinghouse sits at 217 Maine Street in Brunswick, Maine. Built in 1845 to a design by Richard Upjohn, it is a unique example of Gothic Revival architecture done in wood, as the church was built with vertical board-and-batten paneling. It was listed on the National Register of Historic Places in 1969. The congregation dates to 1717. The Senior Pastor is Rev. John Allen.

== Description and history ==
The First Parish Church occupies a prominent location on a rise between downtown Brunswick and the Bowdoin College campus, which lies directly to its south. It is a single-story wood frame structure, whose Gothic Revival features include a buttressed tower, lancet-arched openings for doors and windows, and vertical board-and-batten siding. It originally had a spire, which was blown off in a storm in 1866 and not replaced.

The church congregation was founded in 1717, for which this is the fourth church. It was built, on the site of the third church, in 1846 by the labor of the congregation, to a design by the noted American architect Richard Upjohn. Funding was provided in part by Bowdoin College, and it has been used by the college for commencement exercises and other activities. The attached vestry was built in 1883.

On May 2, 1851, American author Harriet Beecher Stowe had a vision while sitting in pew 23 of the church wherein she saw an enslaved man wounded from a beating he endured from his enslaver. The incident inspired her book Uncle Tom's Cabin. After years in disrepair, the church underwent extensive restoration, which was completed in 2004; the restoration earned the church a Maine Preservation Honor Award in 2006.

== Past Ministers ==
- James Woodside (1718-1719)
- Isaac Taylor (1721-1722)
- Robert Rutherford (1735-1742)
- Robert Dunlap (1747-1760)
- John Miller (1762-1789)
- Ebenezer Coffin (1794-1802)
- Winthrop Bailey (1811-1814)
- Asa Mead (1822-1829)
- George Eliashib Adams (1829-1870)
- Ezra Hoyt Byington (1871-1879)
- William Phones Fisher (1879-1889)
- Edward Beecher Mason (1890-1902)
- Herbert Atchinson Jump (1903-1909)
- John Hastings Quint (1909-1913)
- Chauncey William Goodrich (1913-1917)
- Thompson Eldridge Ashby (1917-1951)
- John Arthur Samuelson (1951-1958)
- Horace Martin McMullen (1959-1962)
- William Brotherton Davis (1962-1966)
- John Harry Wild (1967-1984)
- William Carl Imes (1985-2001)
- Larry Robert Kalajainen (2004-2008)
- Mary Eileen Begley Baard (2009-2021)
- John Allen (2021-present)

== See also ==
External videos
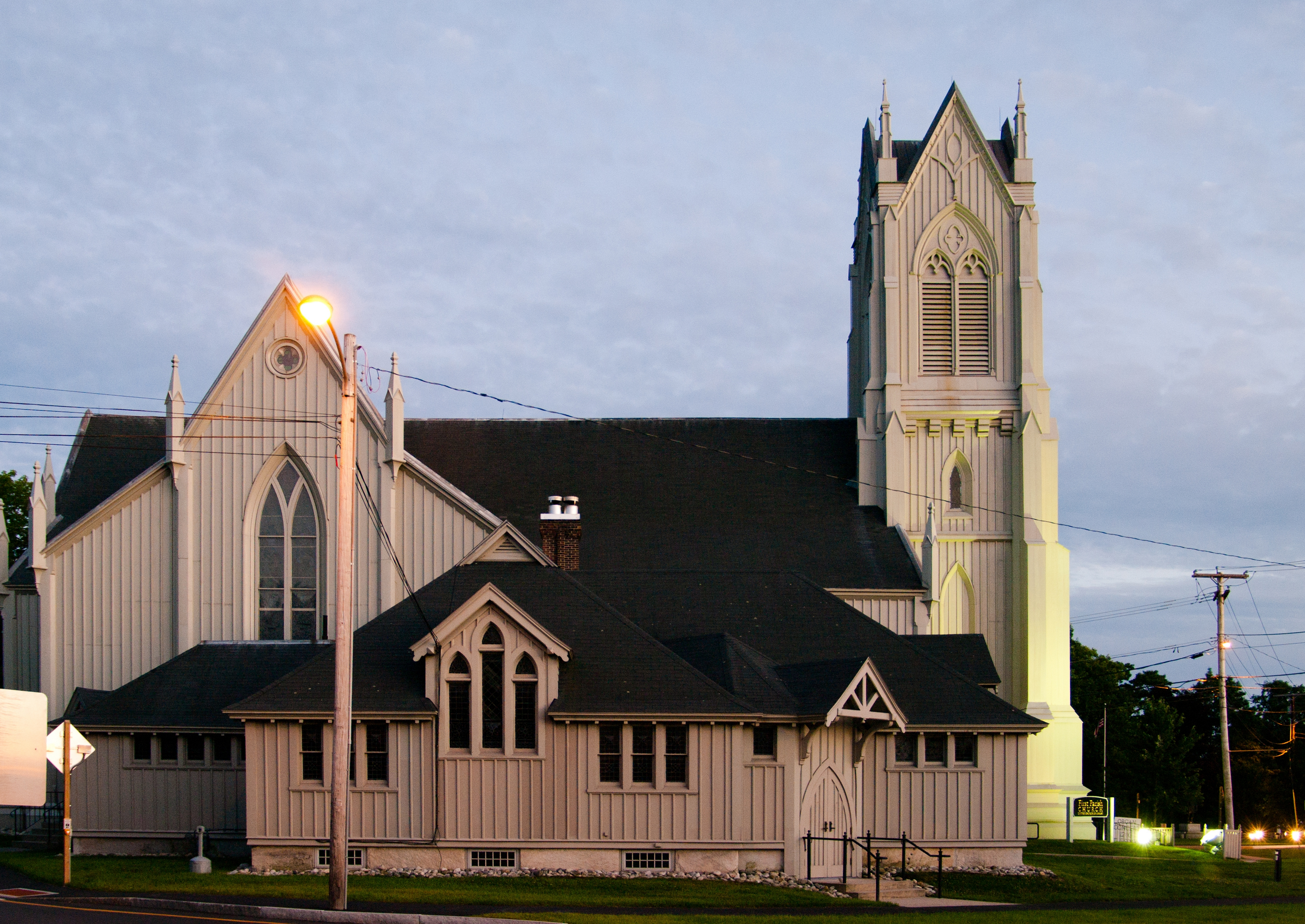
- C-SPAN Cities Tour - Augusta: Harriet Beecher Stowe & Uncle Tom's Cabin, 14:06, C-SPAN

- National Register of Historic Places listings in Cumberland County, Maine
