= Indian Trails Middle School =

Indian Trails Middle School may refer to one of two public schools within the U.S. state of Florida.

- Indian Trails Middle School (Seminole County), a school in Winter Springs
- Indian Trails Middle School (Flagler County), a school in Palm Coast

== See also ==
- Indian Trail School (disambiguation)
