= Maine Medical Association =

- Founded: 1853 (173 years ago)
- Type: Professional physicians association
- Location: Manchester, Maine, U.S.
- Website: mainephysicians.org

The Maine Medical Association (MMA) is an organization in the U.S. state of Maine which advocates for physicians, provides legal services, educational programs and access to publications. Established in 1853, it is an affiliate of the American Medical Association. It publishes the monthly Maine Medicine newsletter.

The association was established on April 28, 1853, after a meeting of physicians at the Tontine Hotel in Brunswick, Maine. A plaque atop a granite post was erected near the now-demolished location on the 150th anniversary of the meeting. It lists the attending physicians.

As of 2026, the association has over 4,300 active members and 39 endorsed pieces of current legislation. Its affiliates include the Hanley Center for Health Leadership and Education, the Maine Public Health Association and the Maine Osteopathic Association. Its chief executive officer is Andrew MacLean.

== Founding members ==
The 27 founding members of the MMA were: Dr. James McKeen (chairman), Dr. Stephen Whitmore, Dr. Richard P. Jenness, Dr. John D. Lincoln, Dr. H. H. Hill, Dr. G. S. Palmer, Dr. Andrew Fuller, Dr. Abial Libby, Dr. Alonzo Garcelon, Dr. John Benson, Dr. Isaac Lincoln, Dr. Amos Nourse, Dr. Cyrus Briggs, Dr. Israel Putnam, Dr. C. W. Whitmore, Dr. Ashur Ellis, Dr. John Mathews, Dr. Joseph W. Ellis, Dr. Cyrus Kendrick Jr., Dr. George E. Brickett, Dr. John Hartwell, Dr. N. R. Boutelle, Dr. J. F. Stanley, Dr. R. W. Lawson, Dr. J. W. Toward, Dr. T. G. Stockbridge and Dr. Nathaniel T. Palmer.

== Gallery ==
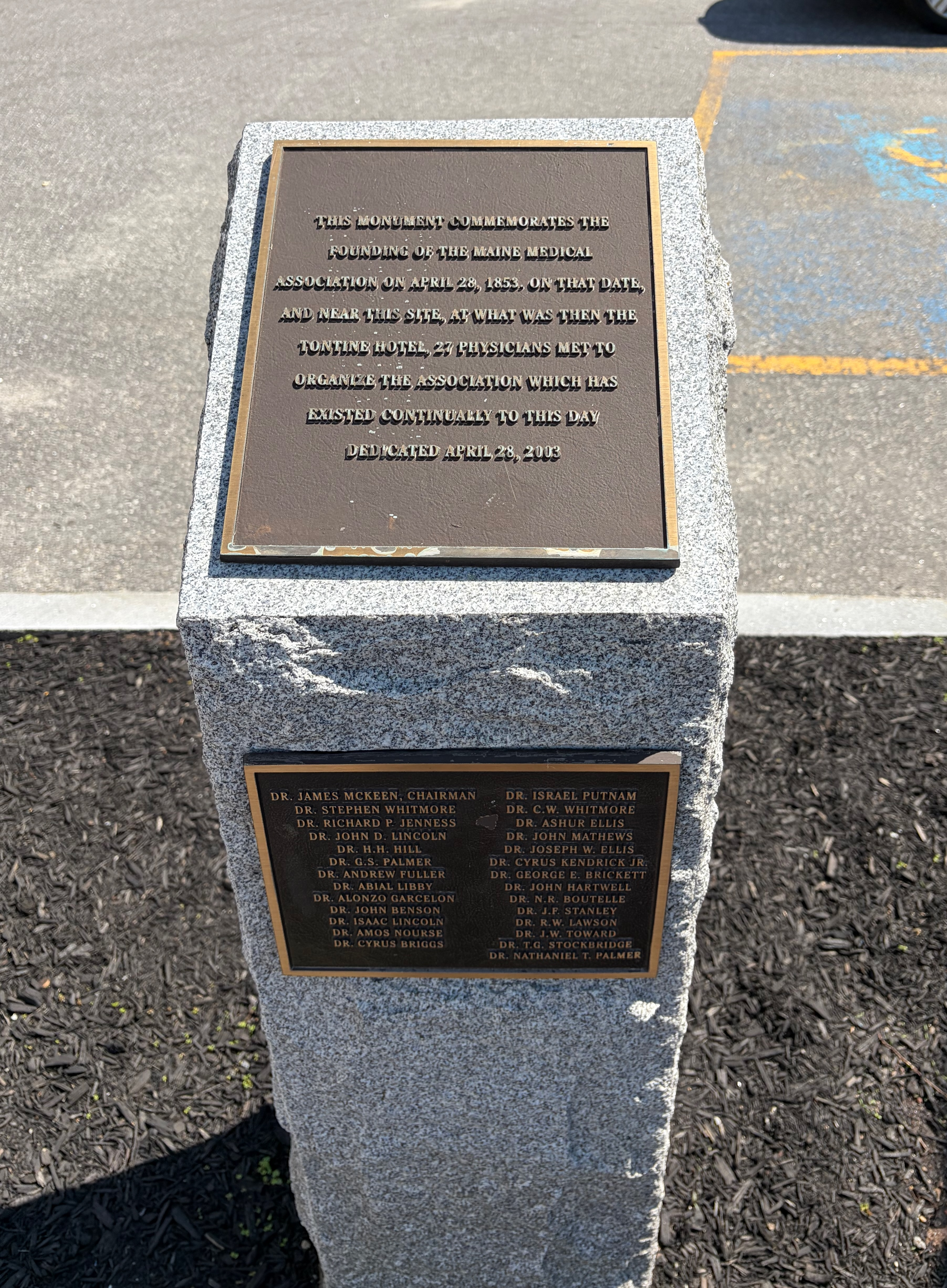
Plaque commemorating the establishment of the Maine Medical Association at the Tontine Hotel in Brunsick, Maine, in 1853

== See also ==
- James M. Bates, former president of the MMA
