= Alpheus Spring Packard =

American entomologist and palaeontologist (1839–1905)

Alpheus Spring Packard Jr.
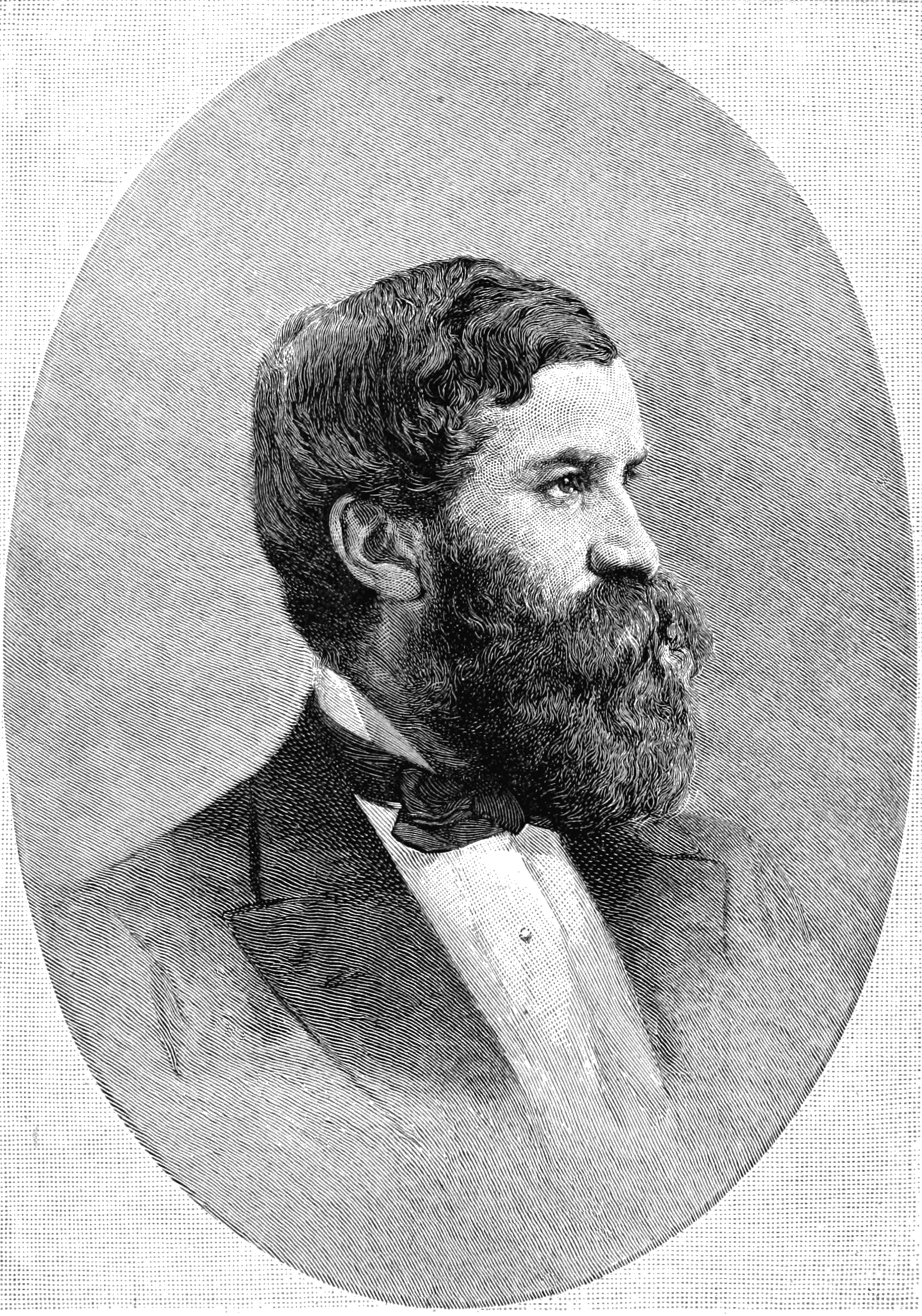
- Packard circa 1888
- Born: February 19, 1839; Brunswick, Maine
- Died: February 14, 1905 (aged 65)
- Education: Bowdoin College, 1861; Harvard University, 1864
- Scientific career
- Fields: Entomology; Palaeontology
- Workplaces: Brown University

Alpheus Spring Packard Jr. LL.D. (February 19, 1839 – February 14, 1905) was an American entomologist and palaeontologist. He described over 500 new animal species – especially butterflies and moths – and was one of the founders of The American Naturalist. He served as a professor at Brown University.

== Early life ==
Packard was one of four sons of Alpheus Spring Packard Sr. (1798–1884) and the brother of William Alfred Packard. He was born in Brunswick, Maine, and went to the Bowdoin College where his father was a professor of Greek and Latin. His mother, Frances Elizabeth, who died shortly after his birth was the daughter of Rev. Appleton who had served as president of Bowdoin College, and Alpha as he was known was raised by an aunt He was encouraged by Paul A. Chadbourne of Williams College to take up zoology. As a member of the Lyceum of Natural History he joined an expedition to Labrador and Greenland. In 1861 he received his bachelors degree. He went to Cambridge and studied under Louis Agassiz. His first publication in 1863 was on types in insects. He also studied for his medical exams and received a doctor's degree in 1864. He made another trip to Labrador along with the artist William Bradford and took a special interest in geology. was Professor of Zoology and Geology at Brown University in Providence, Rhode Island, from 1878 until his death. He was a vocal proponent of Neo-Lamarckism during the eclipse of Darwinism.

== Career ==
After college, he joined the Maine state as an entomologist. From 1862 to 1865 he was enlisted into the First Regiment of Maine Volunteers as an assistant surgeon. During the marches he collected insects. His chief work was the classification and anatomy of arthropods, and contributions to economic entomology, zoogeography, and the phylogeny and metamorphoses of insects. At Boston he became a librarian and custodian for the Boston Society of Natural History working also on his Labrador collections. In 1866 he went to the Peabody Academy of Science along with Putnam, Morse and Hyatt. He left in 1878 to accept a position of professor of Zoology and Geology at Brown University. Packard was appointed to the United States Entomological Commission in 1877 where he served with Charles Valentine Riley and Cyrus Thomas. He wrote school textbooks, such as Zoölogy for High Schools and Colleges (eleventh edition, 1904). His Monograph of the Bombycine Moths of North America was published in three parts (1895, 1905, 1915, edited by T. D. A. Cockerell).

He was elected as a member to the American Philosophical Society in 1878.

== Personal life ==
Packard married Elizabeth Darby Walcott, daughter of Samuel B. Walcott in October 1867 in Salem, Massachusetts. They would have four children: Martha Walcott, Alpheus Appleton, Elizabeth Darby, and Frances Elizabeth. Elizabeth Darby would die at the age of eight. He died on February 14, 1905, in Providence, Rhode Island, with his wife and children outliving him.

== Writings ==
- Report on the insects collected on the Penobscot and Alleguash Rivers, during August and September, 1861, Sixth Annual Report of the Secretary of the Maine Board of Agriculture, Augusta, Maine (pp. 373-376) (1861)
- Guide to the Study of Insects (1869; third edition, 1872)
- The Mammoth Cave and its Inhabitants (1872), with F. W. Putnam
- Life-History of Animals (1876)
- A Naturalist on the Labrador Coast (1891)
- Lamarck, the Founder of Evolution: His Life and Work (1901), French translation, 1903.
- Alpheus Spring Packard (1886). First Lessons in Zoology: Adapted for Use in Schools …. Holt.
