= George Morse =

George Morse may refer to:

- George Morse (basketball) (1920–2012), American professional basketball player
- George Henry Morse (1857–1931), English brewer and mountaineer
- George Washington Morse (1816–1909), Seventh-day Adventist pioneer
- George W. Morse (1830–1915), member of the Washington House of Representatives
- George H. Morse (1839–1905), businessman and mayor of Burlington, Vermont
