= Alexander Cornell du Houx =

American politician (born 1983)

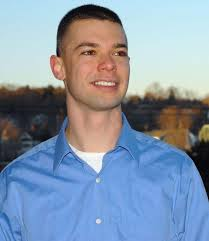
- Alex Cornell du Houx

Member of the Maine House of Representatives from the 66th district
- In office December 2008 – December 2010
- Preceded by: Stan Gerzofsky

Member of the Maine House of Representatives from the 66th district
- In office December 2010 – December 2012
- Succeeded by: Michael McClellan

Personal details
- Born: March 6, 1983 (age 43)
- Party: Democrat
- Education: Bowdoin College
- Occupation: Officer in the US Naval Reserve
- Website: http://alexcornell.org/

Alexander Cornell du Houx (born March 6, 1983) is an American politician from Maine and officer in the U.S. Navy. He Joined the U.S. Marines out of high school and was deployed to Iraq. He was elected to the Maine House of Representatives in 2008 and 2012, worked for the Truman National Security Project on energy security, received a direct commission in the Navy reserves and deployed to the Middle East.

== State legislature ==
Cornell du Houx was elected to the Maine House of Representatives in 2008, representing District 66, Brunswick for two terms. He served on the Veterans’ and Legal Affairs Committee and the Energy, Technology and Utilities Committees. He was chair of the Veterans Caucus and served on the task force to combat veteran's homelessness. Cornell du Houx served as vice-chair of the National Conference of State Legislatures' Agriculture and Energy Committee and served on NCSL's Criminal Justice Committee. He helped found and lead the Coalition of Legislators for Energy Action Now. He is also a vice-chair of the DNC's Veteran and Military Families Council.

According to Maine.gov, Cornell du Houx sponsored or co-sponsored 155 bills, rules, memorials, sentiments or resolutions during the 124th Legislature and 136 during the 125th Legislature. This includes seven bills enacted into law sponsored (as compared with bills co-sponsored, rules, memorials, sentiments or resolutions) by Rep. Cornell du Houx in 2008-2010 (124th) and seven bills sponsored and enacted in 2011/2012 (125th). Successful legislation co-sponsored by Cornell du Houx includes 98 bills in 2008-2010.

In 2012, Cornell du Houx chose not to run for re-election, as he was called to active duty with the U.S. Navy. At the same time he was involved in a public "falling out" with fellow representative Erin Herbig, after their engagement was called off.

Cornell du Houx's time in the Legislature was chronicled in the book On Point: Voices and Values of the Young Elected Officials by Jeff Thigpen, with a foreword written by Senate Majority Leader George Mitchell. His political and military service was also featured in the Military Times.

== Military service ==
Cornell du Houx enlisted in the U.S. Marine Reserves in 2002, upon graduating from Carrabec High School. He attended Recruit Training and the School of Infantry where he received a Military Occupation Specially of 0351 Assaultman, working with demolitions and rockets and assigned to an infantry unit. He was assigned to Alpha Company, 1st Battalion, 25th Marines, 4th Marine Division. Cornell du Houx was deployed to Fallujah, Iraq in 2006 and spent a year conducting security and counter-insurgency operations. He was profiled by NBC Nightly News during his deployment to Iraq.

== Energy security and climate change ==
Cornell du Houx was hired by the Truman National Security Project to start the program Operation Free, a coalition of veterans and national security experts who believe oil dependence and climate change pose threats to national security. As part of Operation Free, Cornell du Houx organized and spoke at press conferences and events at the White House, and participated in the United Nations Climate Change Conference in Copenhagen. He also organized state legislators across the U.S. to promote clean energy policies and organized numerous multimillion-dollar media efforts. Operation Free won the coveted Campaign and Elections REED award for the best Public Affairs Campaign of 2010.

== Diplomatic relations ==
Cornell du Houx traveled with the Department of State's Bureau of Educational and Cultural Affairs American Council of Young Political Leaders exchange program to foster government-to- government relations and promote mutual understanding, respect, and friendship, with the goal of cultivating long-lasting relationships among young people, who are poised to become tomorrow's global leaders and policy makers. Cornell du Houx traveled to Indonesia and Malaysia and he helped organize and lead the programs' first delegation of U.S. veterans to Australia. The pilot exchange was considered successful, and as a result the State Department decided to continue funding veteran's delegations, which traveled to Japan in the summer of 2013. Cornell du Houx has also traveled to China and Israel to meet with government officials and foster state-to-state relations.

== Community service ==
Cornell du Houx volunteered with Habitat for Humanity since entering Bowdoin College, and also served on their board in Maine. He led a service trip to Guatemala with the program Safe Passage, to help kids move from working in the city dump to gaining an education. He also worked in Peru to help build playgrounds for children in Lima's poorest areas and conducted a year of service with AmeriCorps. Cornell du Houx coached lacrosse and soccer at Brunswick Junior High School. He co-chairs the Mitchell Institute's Alumni Council and sits on their advisory board, which works to provide opportunity and access to higher education. Former U.S. Senate Majority Leader George J. Mitchell publicly stated, “Alex’s commitment to serving the greater good may be equaled by a rare few, but it is surpassed by none.” He is also the legislative officer for the Brunswick American Legion and senior advisor to the American Veterans Committee.

== Education ==
Cornell du Houx grew up in Solon, Maine and attended Carrabec High School. He was accepted to Bowdoin College as a George J. Mitchell Scholar and graduated with honors in Government and Legal Studies, with a minor in Theater in 2008. Newsweek chronicled his return to campus after serving with the Marines in Iraq.
