= Brunswick, Maine =

Town in the United States

- Town
- Aerial view of Brunswick along the Androscoggin River

- Seal
- Motto: "Beautifully balanced"
- Location in Cumberland County and the state of Maine
- Coordinates: 43°53′39″N 69°58′40″W
- Country: United States
- State: Maine
- County: Cumberland
- Settled: 1628
- Incorporated (town): 1739
- Communities: Brunswick; Brunswick Landing; Bunganuc Landing; Cooks Corner; Dyer Corner; Growstown; Harding; Merepoint

Government
  - Type: Town Council/Town Manager

Area
  - Total: 54.34 sq mi (140.74 km^{2})
  - Land: 46.73 sq mi (121.03 km^{2})
  - Water: 7.61 sq mi (19.71 km^{2})
- Elevation: 85 ft (26 m)

Population (2020)
  - Total: 21,756
  - Density: 433.9/sq mi (167.5/km^{2})
- Time zone: UTC-5 (Eastern)
  - Summer (DST): UTC-4 (Eastern)
- ZIP code: 04011
- GNIS feature ID: 582375
- Website: www.brunswickme.gov

Brunswick is a town in Cumberland County, Maine, United States. Brunswick is included in the Lewiston-Auburn, Maine metropolitan New England City and Town Area. The population was 21,756 at the 2020 United States Census. Part of the Portland-South Portland-Biddeford metropolitan area, Brunswick is home to Bowdoin College, the Bowdoin International Music Festival, the Bowdoin College Museum of Art, the Peary–MacMillan Arctic Museum, and the Maine State Music Theatre. It was formerly home to the U.S. Naval Air Station Brunswick, which closed in 2011 and has since been partially released to redevelopment as "Brunswick Landing".

== History ==
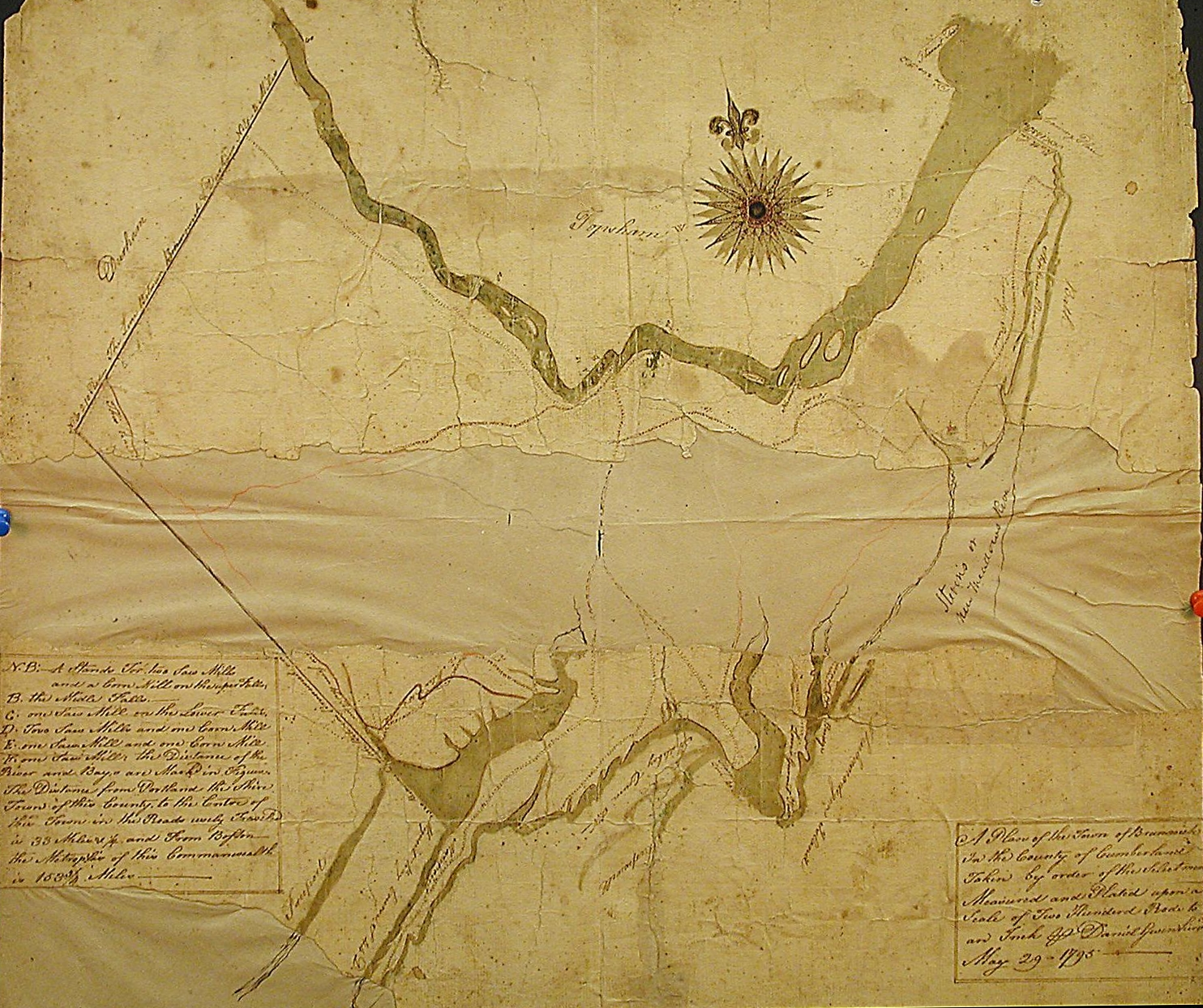
Map of Brunswick, Maine, dated May 29, 1795

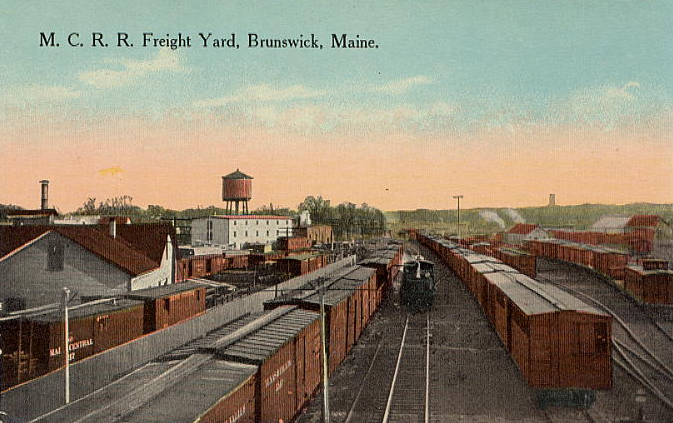
The rail yard at Brunswick, Maine, pictured in a c. 1910 postcard

Settled in 1628 by Thomas Purchase and other fishermen, the area was called by its Indigenous Peoples' name, Pejepscot, meaning "the long, rocky rapids part [of the river]". In 1639, Purchase placed his settlement under protection of the Massachusetts Bay Colony. During King Philip's War in 1676, Pejepscot was burned and abandoned, although a garrison called Fort Andros was built on the ruins during King William's War. During the war, in Major Benjamin Church's second expedition a year later, he arrived on September 11, 1690, with 300 men at Casco Bay. He went up the Androscoggin River to Fort Pejepscot (present day Brunswick, Maine). From there he went 40 miles (64 km) upriver and attacked a native village. Three or four native men were shot in retreat. When Church discovered five captive settlers in the wigwams, six or seven prisoners were butchered as an example, and nine prisoners were taken. A few days later, in retaliation, the natives attacked Church at Cape Elizabeth on Purpooduc Point, killing seven of his men and wounding 24 others. On September 26, Church returned to Portsmouth, New Hampshire.

The 1713 Treaty of Portsmouth brought peace to the region between the Abenaki Indians and the English colonists.

In 1714, a consortium from Boston and Portsmouth bought the land, thereafter called the Pejepscot purchase. The Massachusetts General Court constituted the township in 1717, naming it "Brunswick" in honor of the House of Brunswick and its scion, King George I. A stone fort called Fort George was built in 1715 near the falls. But during Dummer's War on July 13, 1722, Abenaki warriors from Norridgewock burned the village. Consequently, Governor Samuel Shute declared war on the Abenakis. In 1724, 208 English colonial militia left Fort Richmond and sacked Norridgewock during Dummer's War. Brunswick was rebuilt again in 1727, and in 1739 incorporated as a town. It became a prosperous seaport, where Bowdoin College was chartered in 1794.

In 1900, Brunswick was the largest town in Maine, with a population of 6,806.

The Androscoggin River falls in three successive stages for a total vertical drop of 41 feet (12 m), providing water power for industry. Brunswick became a major producer of lumber, with as many as 25 sawmills. Some of the lumber went into shipbuilding. Other firms produced paper, soap, flour, marble and granite work, carriages and harness, plows, furniture, shoes and confections. The town was site of the first cotton mill in Maine, the Brunswick Cotton Manufactory Company, built in 1809 to make yarn. Purchased in 1812, the mill was enlarged by the Maine Cotton & Woolen Factory Company. In 1857, the Cabot Manufacturing Company was established to make cotton textiles. It bought the failed Worumbo Mill and expanded the brick factory along the falls. Needing even more room, the company in 1890 persuaded the town to move Maine Street, which was renamed from Twelve Rod Road upon Maine's statehood in 1820. The street was formerly the route of the old Indian trail which led between the falls of the Androscoggin and Maquoit Bay.

Principal employers for Brunswick include L.L. Bean, Bath Iron Works, Atlantic Federal Credit Union, as well as companies that produce fiberglass construction material and electrical switches. A number of health services providers serving Maine's mid-coast area are located in Brunswick. The former Naval Air Station Brunswick was a major employer in Brunswick prior to its closure.

=== National Register of Historic Places ===
Brunswick has a number of historic districts recognized on the National Register of Historic Places:

- Androscoggin Swinging Bridge
- Henry Boody House
- Brunswick Commercial Historic District
- Parker Cleaveland House
- Crystal Spring Farm
- John Dunlap House
- Federal Street Historic District
- First Parish Church
- Lincoln Street Historic District
- Massachusetts Hall, Bowdoin College
- Pennellville Historic District
- Richardson House
- St. Paul's Episcopal Church
- Harriet Beecher Stowe House
- Whittier Field

== Geography ==
According to the United States Census Bureau, the town has an area of 54.34 square miles (140.74 km^{2}), of which 46.73 square miles (121.03 km^{2}) is land and 7.61 square miles (19.71 km^{2}) is water. Brunswick is at the north end of Casco Bay, as well as the head of tide and head of navigation on the Androscoggin River. It is the easternmost town in Cumberland County.

=== Climate ===
Climate data for Brunswick, Maine
Month	Jan	Feb	Mar	Apr	May	Jun	Jul	Aug	Sep	Oct	Nov	Dec	Year
Record high °F (°C)	61 (16)	59 (15)	73 (23)	84 (29)	94 (34)	100 (38)	98 (37)	104 (40)	95 (35)	85 (29)	74 (23)	68 (20)	104 (40)
Mean daily maximum °F (°C)	31 (−1)	34 (1)	43 (6)	54 (12)	65 (18)	74 (23)	79 (26)	78 (26)	70 (21)	59 (15)	47 (8)	36 (2)	56 (13)
Mean daily minimum °F (°C)	10 (−12)	14 (−10)	23 (−5)	33 (1)	44 (7)	53 (12)	59 (15)	58 (14)	50 (10)	38 (3)	30 (−1)	18 (−8)	36 (2)
Record low °F (°C)	−49 (−45)	−25 (−32)	−10 (−23)	13 (−11)	27 (−3)	34 (1)	37 (3)	37 (3)	28 (−2)	18 (−8)	1 (−17)	−21 (−29)	−49 (−45)
Average precipitation inches (mm)	3.72 (94)	3.55 (90)	4.37 (111)	4.74 (120)	4.52 (115)	4.17 (106)	4.00 (102)	3.30 (84)	4.23 (107)	4.94 (125)	5.62 (143)	4.07 (103)	51.23 (1,300)
Source: weather.com

== Demographics ==
Historical population
Census	Pop.	Note	%±
1790	1,357		—
1800	1,809		33.3%
1810	2,682		48.3%
1820	2,931		9.3%
1830	3,547		21.0%
1840	4,259		20.1%
1850	4,977		16.9%
1860	4,723		−5.1%
1870	4,687		−0.8%
1880	5,384		14.9%
1890	6,012		11.7%
1900	6,806		13.2%
1910	6,621		−2.7%
1920	7,261		9.7%
1930	7,604		4.7%
1940	8,658		13.9%
1950	10,996		27.0%
1960	15,797		43.7%
1970	16,195		2.5%
1980	17,366		7.2%
1990	20,906		20.4%
2000	21,172		1.3%
2010	20,278		−4.2%
2020	21,756		7.3%

As of 2000, the median income for a household in the town was $40,402; and the median income for a family was $49,088. Males had a median income of $32,141 versus $24,927 for females. The per capita income for the town was $20,322. About 5.0% of families and 8.0% of the population were below the poverty line, including 8.6% of those under age 18 and 8.1% of those age 65 or over.

=== 2010 census ===
As of the census of 2010, there were 15,175 people, 7,183 households, and 6,498 families residing in the census-designated place of Brunswick. The population density was 433.9 inhabitants per square mile (167.5/km^{2}). There were 9,599 housing units at an average density of 205.4 per square mile (79.3/km^{2}). The racial makeup of the town was 93.0% White, 1.7% African American, 0.3% Native American, 2.1% Asian, 0.5% from other races, and 2.4% from two or more races. Hispanic or Latino of any race were 2.9% of the population.

There were 8,469 households, of which 25.7% had children under the age of 18 living with them; 44.7% were married couples living together; 9.7% had a female householder with no husband present; 3.3% had a male householder with no wife present; and 42.3% were non-families. 35.1% of all households were made up of individuals, and 16.5% had someone living alone who was 65 years of age or older. The average household size was 2.19 and the average family size was 2.83.

The median age in the town was 41.4 years. 19.2% of residents were under the age of 18; 14.1% were between the ages of 18 and 24; 20.8% were from 25 to 44; 27.6% were from 45 to 64; and 18.2% were 65 years of age or older. The gender makeup of the town was 47.1% male and 52.9% female.

== Education ==
Brunswick High School

The Brunswick School Department operates the town's public schools, including:

- Brunswick High School
- Brunswick Junior High School
- Kate Furbish Elementary School
- Harriet Beecher Stowe Elementary School
- REAL School
- Region 10 Technical High School

Other local educational institutions include:

- Children's School of Arts & Science
- Saint John's Catholic School
- Bowdoin College
- Southern Maine Community College Midcoast Campus

The Growstown School, on Woodside Road, is the last remaining of the town's formerly twenty-six one-room schoolhouses.

== Sister city ==
Brunswick's sister city is Trinidad, Cuba.

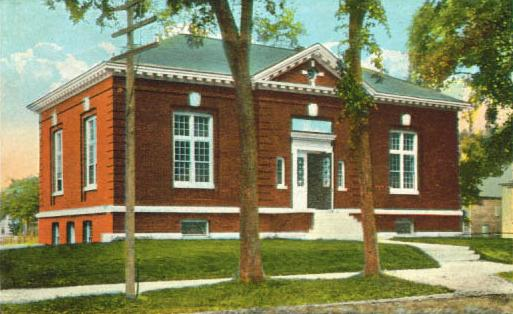
Curtis Memorial Library c. 1915

== Sites of interest ==
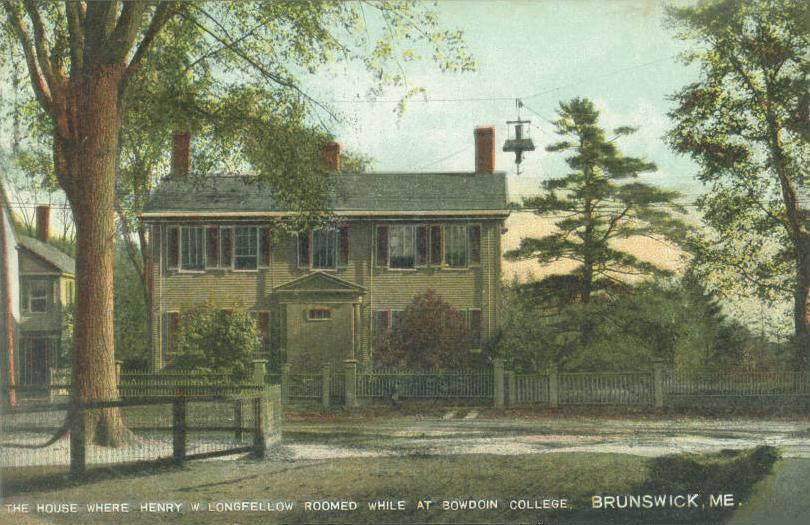
House where Henry Wadsworth Longfellow, Bowdoin Class of 1825, roomed

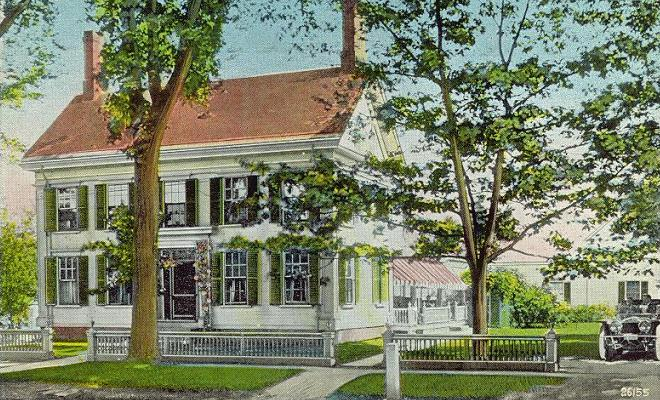
Harriet Beecher Stowe House, where, between 1850 and 1852, Stowe wrote Uncle Tom's Cabin

- Androscoggin Pedestrian Swinging Bridge
- Bowdoin College Museum of Art
- Pejepscot Historical Society (containing Pejepscot Museum)
- Joshua L. Chamberlain Museum
- Skolfield-Whittier House

== Transportation ==
The town is served by Interstate 295, U.S. Routes 1 and 201, and Maine State Route 24, Maine State Route 24 Business, Maine State Route 123 and Maine State Route 196.

Amtrak's Downeaster train service terminates at Brunswick station and connects the town to the Portland Transportation Center and Boston's North Station.

Greater Portland Metro provides several trips a day between the Portland Transportation Center and Brunswick station with its Metro Breez bus service. A local bus service is provided by Brunswick Link.

== Notable people ==
- John Stevens Cabot Abbott, clergyman and author
- Daniel Ankeles, state legislator
- Poppy Arford, state legislator
- Dale Arnold, sportscaster
- Austin Cary, forester
- Fanny Chamberlain, wife of Joshua Chamberlain
- Joshua Chamberlain, Civil War–era general and governor of Maine
- Walter Christie, author
- Robert P. T. Coffin, poet
- Alexander Cornell du Houx, state legislator
- Scott Cowger, state legislator
- Elizabeth W. Crandall, environmental and women's rights activist
- Robert L. Dale, pilot in Antarctica, Dale Glacier namesake
- Robert P. Dunlap, congressman, 11th governor of Maine
- Charles Carroll Everett, theologian
- Catherine 'Kate' Furbish, botanist
- Will Geoghegan, distance runner
- Stanley Gerzofsky, state legislator
- William W. Gilchrist Jr., painter
- John Gould, reporter, columnist
- Frederic Aldin Hall, professor, school chancellor
- Joshua Herrick, congressman
- Graeme K., musician
- Angus King, U.S. Senator, 72nd governor of Maine
- Lady Lamb, musician
- Henry Wadsworth Longfellow, poet
- Cynthia Lord, children's author
- Stump Merrill, baseball player
- Karen Mills, Administrator of Small Business Administration
- Ralph Mims, basketball player
- George W. Morse, state legislator
- Benjamin Orr, congressman
- Alpheus Spring Packard, professor
- Marie Ahnighito Peary, writer
- George Palmer Putnam, publisher
- Luke Rathborne, musician
- John Rankin Rogers, third Governor of Washington
- Mark Rogers, pitcher for the Milwaukee Brewers
- Patricia E. Ryan, human rights advocate and women's rights lobbyist
- Arthur A. Small, Iowa state legislator and lawyer
- Marjorie McKenney Stone, military veteran
- Harriet Beecher Stowe, abolitionist, author
- Brigadier Samuel Thompson, Revolutionary War soldier
- Grant Tremblay, astrophysicist
- George J. Varney, author and historian
- Dan Walters, baseball player and police officer
- Robert Zildjian, founder of Sabian cymbals

== In popular culture ==
The book Uncle Tom's Cabin was written by Harriet Beecher Stowe while she was living in Brunswick, during the time that her husband was a professor at Bowdoin. She got a key vision for the book in the First Parish Church.

A scene in the 1993 movie The Man Without a Face was filmed in the town.

== Gallery ==
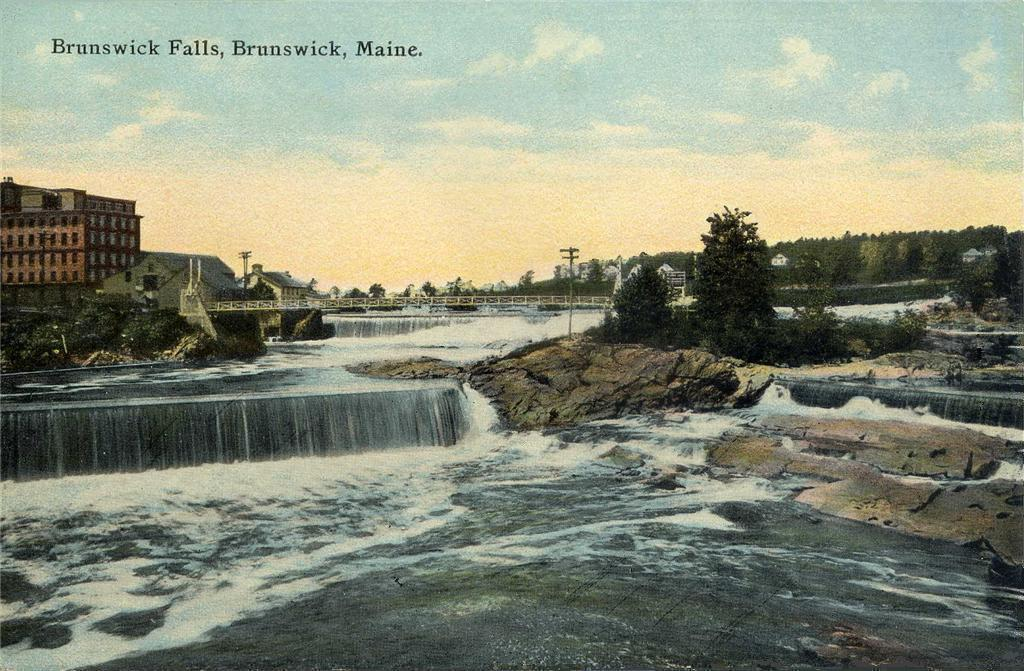
Brunswick Falls c. 1912

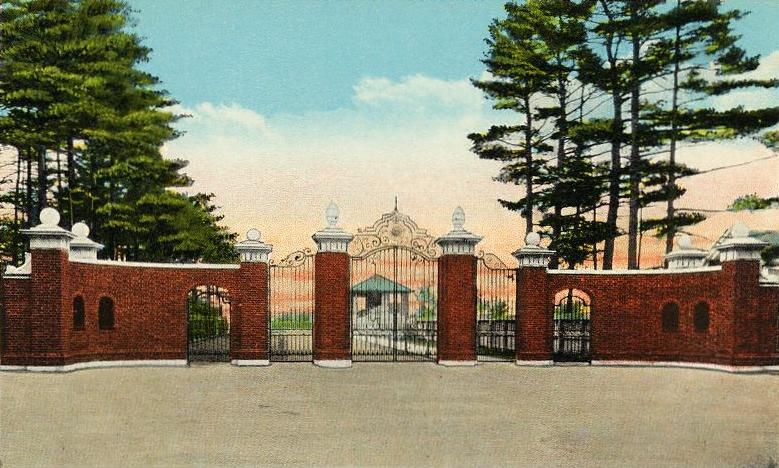
Class of 1903 Gates at Bowdoin c. 1920

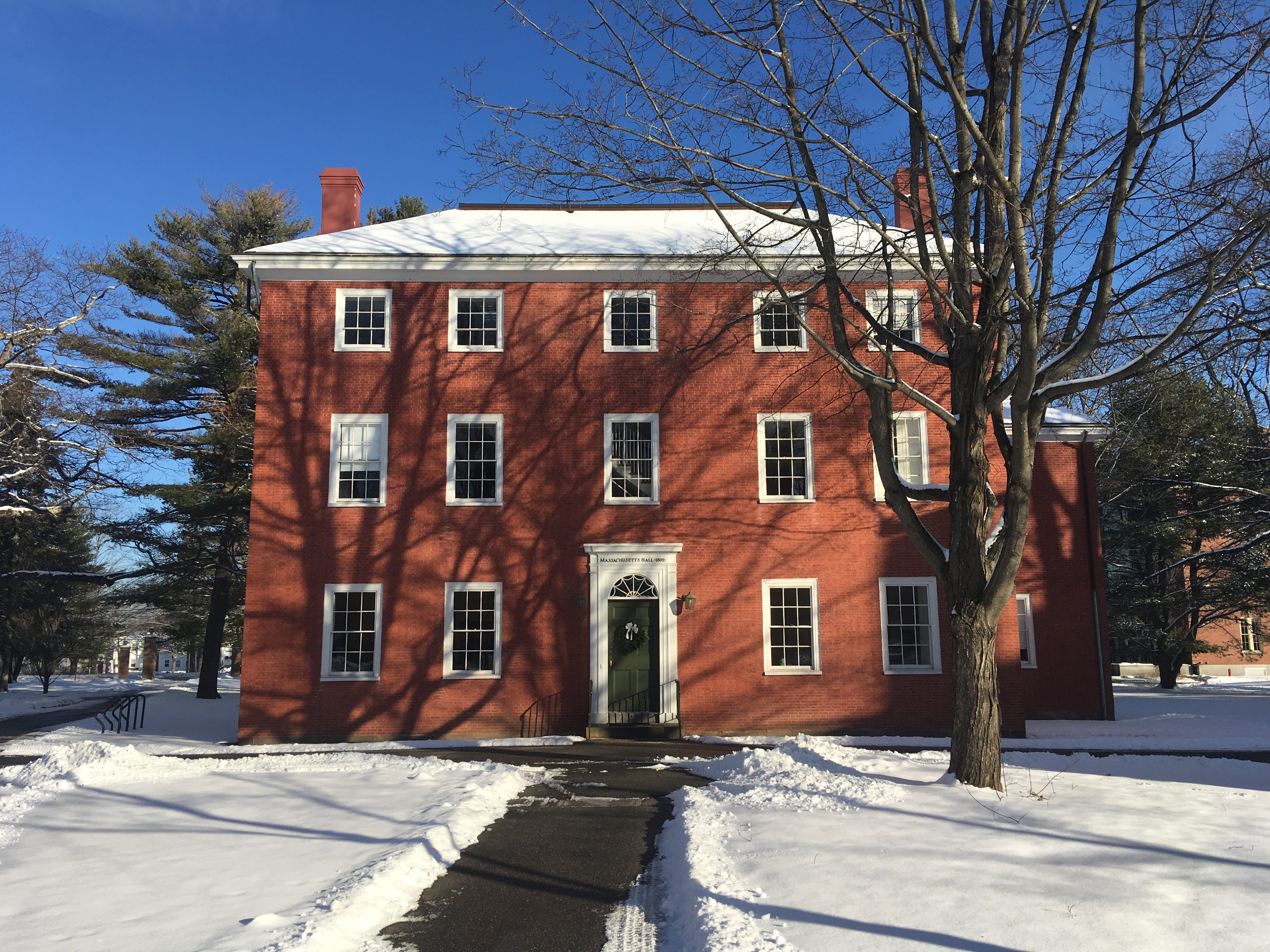
Massachusetts Hall at Bowdoin

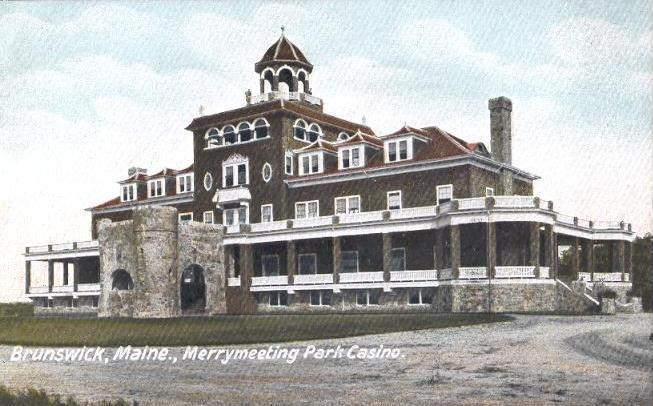
Merrymeeting Park Casino c. 1905

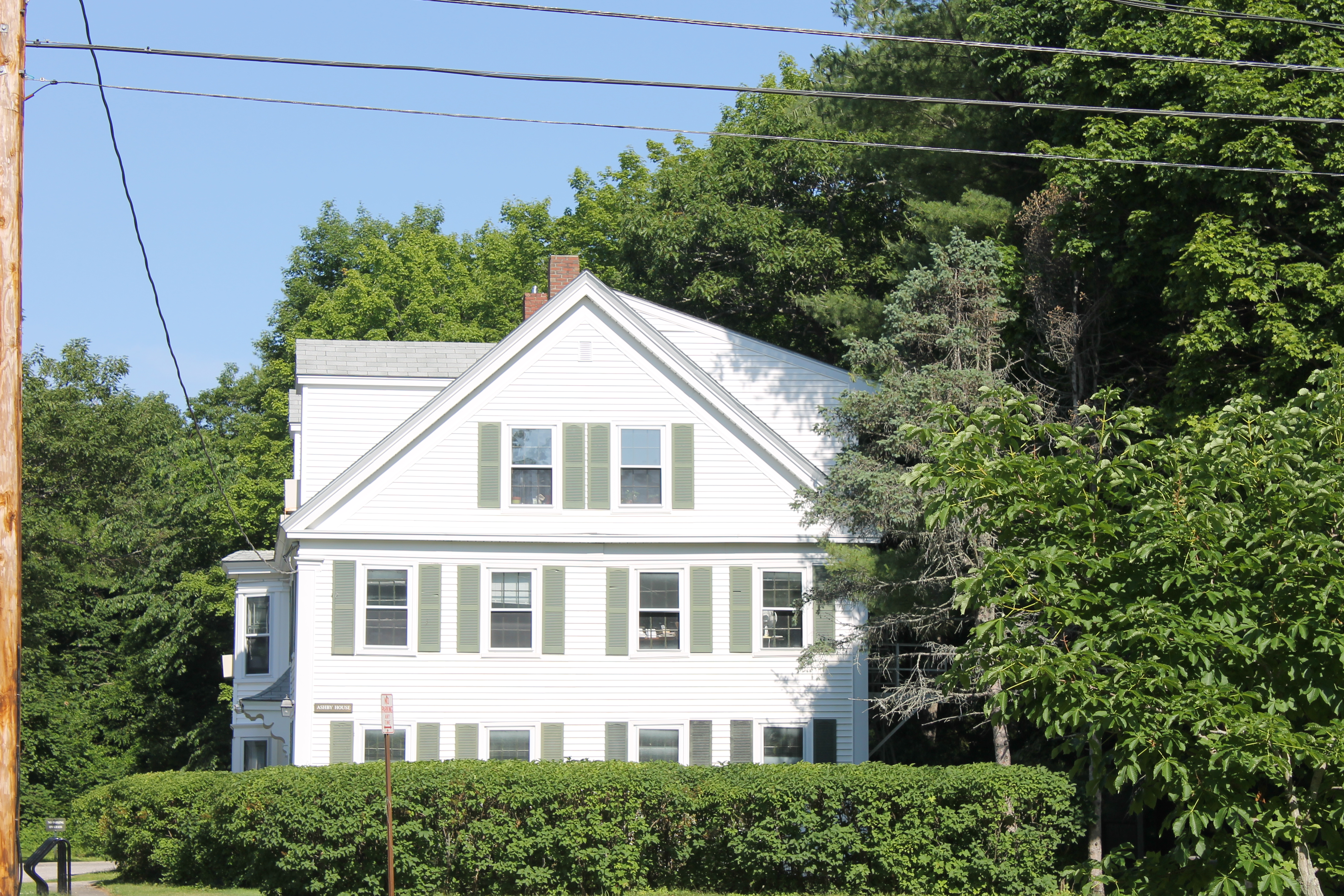
One of the middle-class New England homes in Brunswick

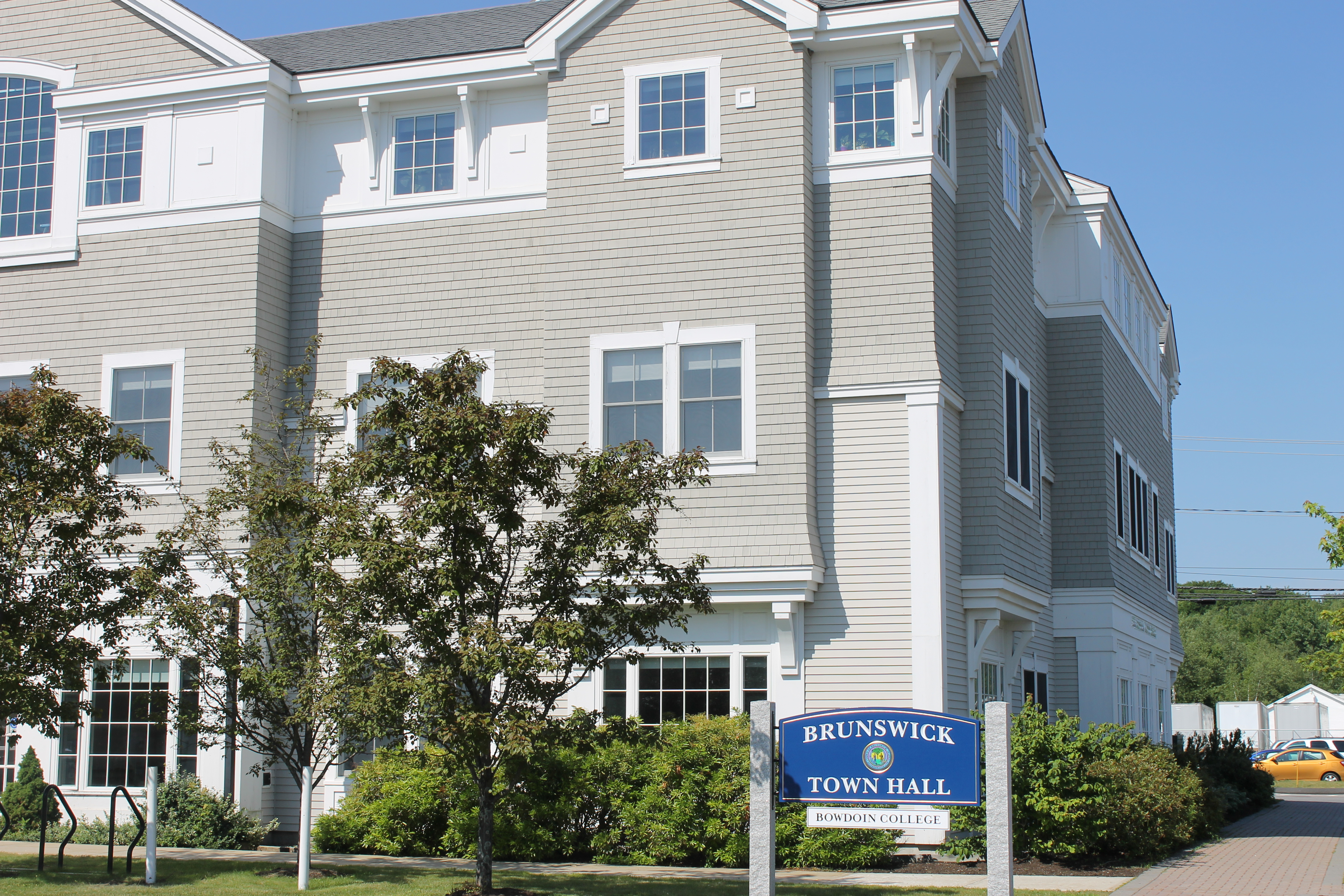
Brunswick Town Hall

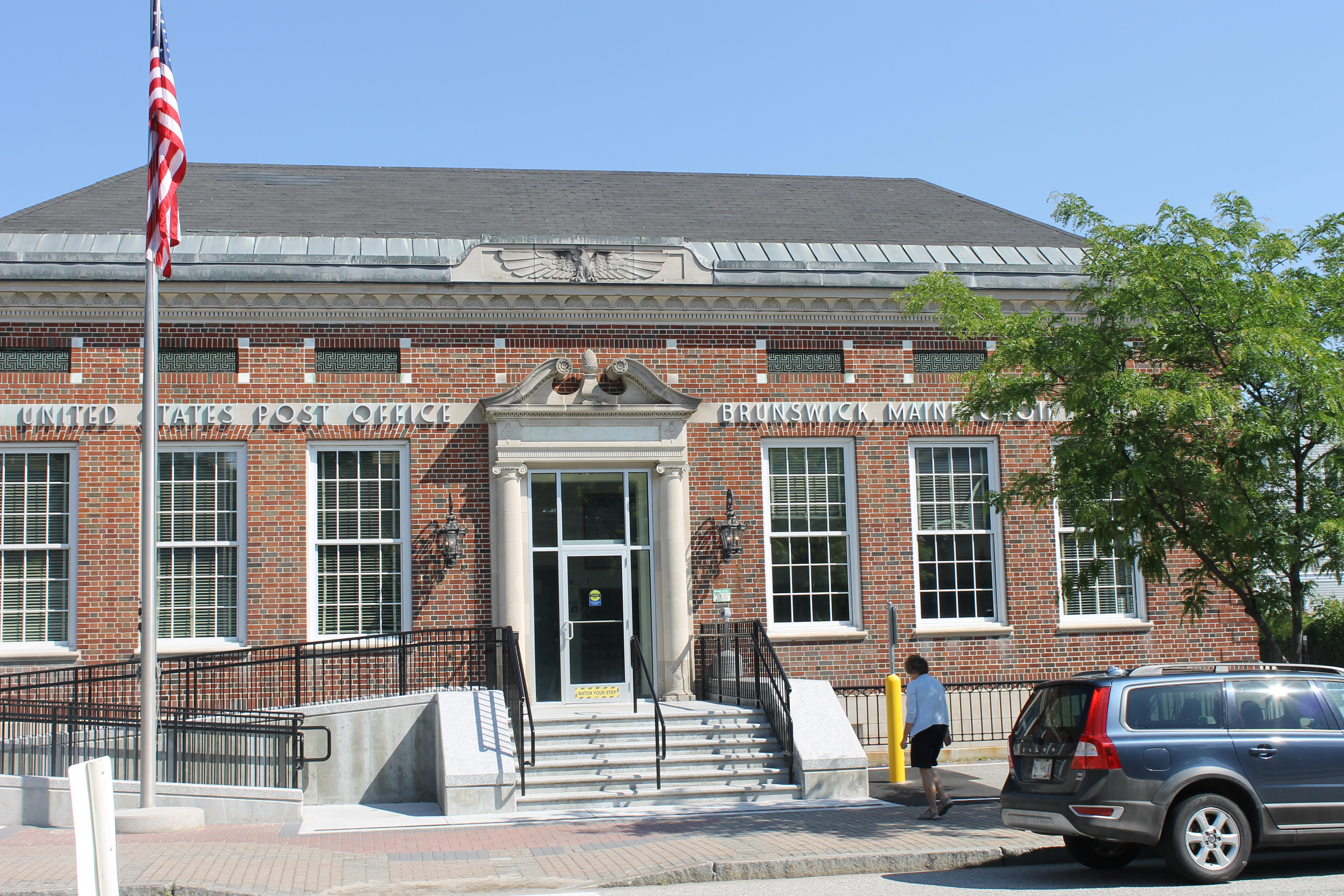
U.S. Post Office in Brunswick

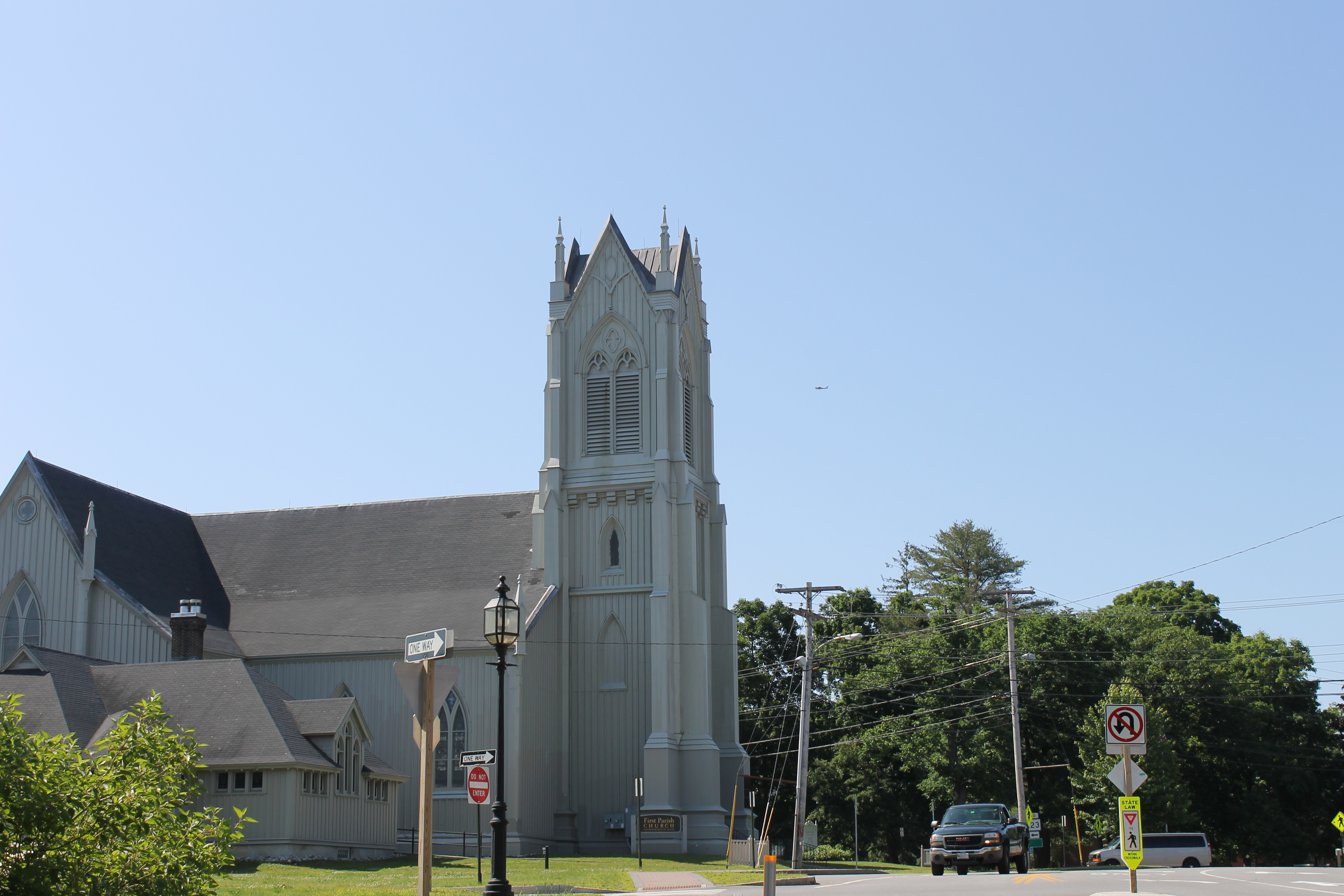
An example of Gothic Revival architecture, the First Parish United Church of Christ at 207 Maine Street in Brunswick (founded 1845), was added in 1969 to the National Register of Historic Places.
