= Brookfield Village Historic District =

Historic district in Vermont, United States

- U.S. National Register of Historic Places
- U.S. Historic district
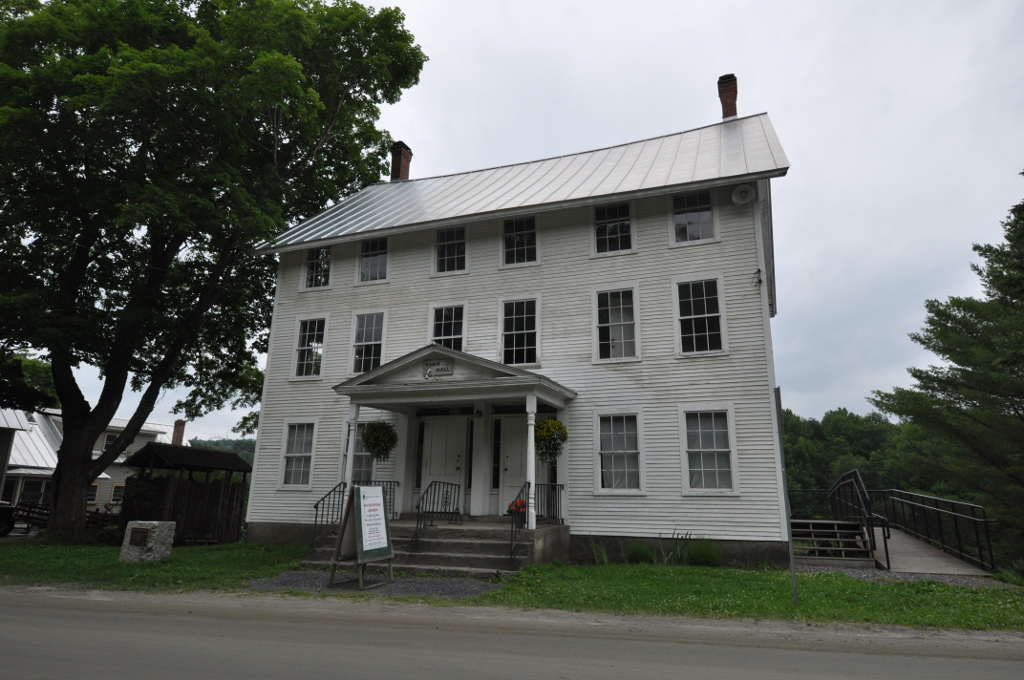
- Old Town Hall

- Location within Vermont Location within the United States
- Location: Sunset Lake area, Brookfield, Vermont
- Coordinates: 44°2′35″N 72°36′7″W
- Area: 450 acres (180 ha)
- Architectural style: Greek Revival
- NRHP reference No.: 74000237
- Added to NRHP: March 28, 1974

The Brookfield Village Historic District encompasses the 19th-century village center of Brookfield, Vermont. Arrayed on the eastern shore of Sunset Lake, it includes well-preserved examples of Greek Revival architecture, and is best known for the Sunset Lake Floating Bridge, a pontoon bridge that provides access to the village from the west. It was listed on the National Register of Historic Places in 1974.

== Description and history ==
The town of Brookfield was chartered in 1781, and developed along Ridge Road, which was in the 19th century a major north-south stagecoach route, connecting Montpelier and Randolph. The town arose on the eastern shore of Sunset Pond (originally known as Colt's Pond), which was in 1812 spanned by the first incarnation of the Sunset Lake Floating Bridge, the only known pontoon bridge in the eastern United States. The village center has lost little of its 19th-century charm, retaining unpaved main roads and tall shade trees.

The historic district covers 450 acres (180 ha), extending along the east side of Sunset Lake as far south as the First Congregational Church, and more than half a mile north of the floating bridge. It extends westward across the lake and all the way to the Interstate 89 right of way, thus including a portion of the village's rural views. The developed area of the district extends along Ridge Road and Shore Road, with mostly modestly scaled residences that have vernacular Greek Revival styling. Prominent public buildings include the church (built 1843) and the former town hall, a three-story mid-19th century building that has housed a variety of municipal functions and community organizations throughout its history. Near the southern end of the village are remnants of a modest 19th-century industrial enterprise, a fork factory powered by the waters of Sunset Brook, which exits the lake near its southern end.

== See also ==
- National Register of Historic Places listings in Orange County, Vermont
