= Charles Carroll Everett =

American divine and philosopher (1829–1900)

The Reverend Charles Carroll Everett
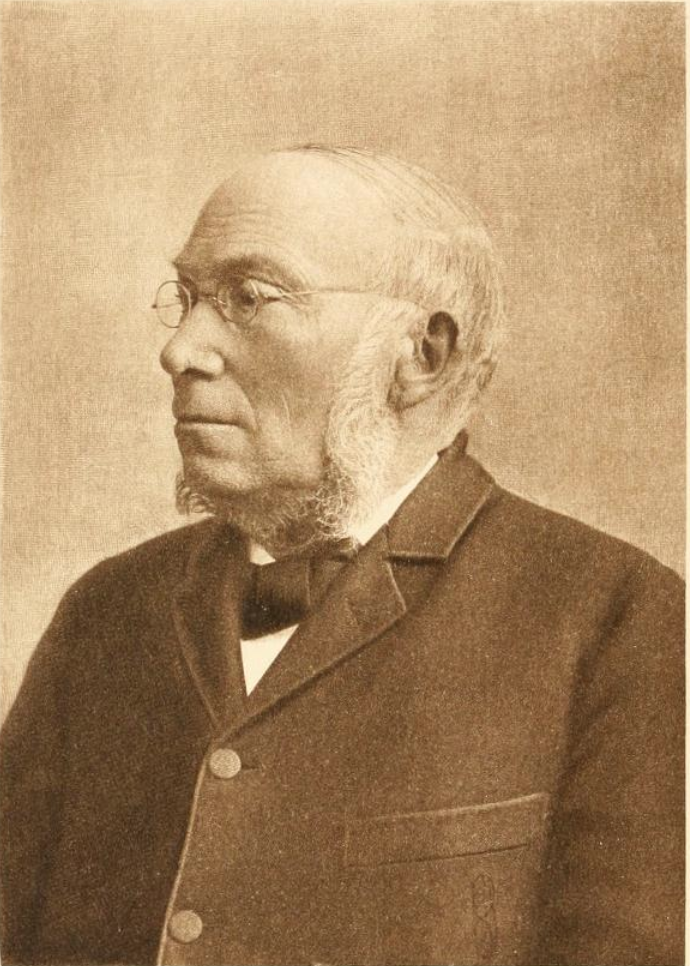

Personal details
- Born: 19 June 1829; Brunswick, Maine, US
- Died: 16 October 1900 (aged 71); Cambridge, Massachusetts, US
- Occupation: Clergyman; academic administrator
- Education: Bowdoin College; University of Berlin; Harvard University

Charles Carroll Everett (June 19, 1829 – October 16, 1900) was an American divine and philosopher.

== Early life and education ==
Charles was born on June 19, 1829, in Brunswick, Maine, to Ebenezer Everett and Joanna Batchedler Prince. His father was a prominent citizen of Brunswick, a Harvard educated lawyer, banker, and long-time trustee of Bowdoin College. During the 1840s he was also elected to represent Brunswick in the Maine Legislature. The Everetts were an old, notable, and well connected New England family. Among his father's first cousins were Massachusetts Senator and Secretary of State Edward Everett and Ambassador Alexander Hill Everett. His first cousin, Mary Susan Everett, was married to General Henry Larcom Abbot.

In 1846 Charles entered Bowdoin College and graduated in 1850. Following his graduation he began studying medicine at the Bowdoin Medical College, but in 1851 he opted to go to Europe and entered as a student at the University of Berlin. In 1853 he returned to the United States and Bowdoin as a tutor and professor of modern languages, as well as the office of university librarian. In 1858 he entered the Harvard Divinity School in Cambridge, Massachusetts, and graduated the following year with a Doctorate of Divinity.

== Ministry and academic career ==
In 1859, the same year as his graduation from Harvard, he became the pastor of the Independent Congregational (Unitarian) church at Bangor, Maine, a position he held until 1869.

In 1869, he resigned from the pulpit to take the Bussey professorship of theology at Harvard University. In 1878 he was elevated to dean of the faculty of theology. During his time at Harvard he wrote numerous books and articles, particularly on the philosophy of religion. Toward the end of his career, he unsuccessfully attempted to see the school publish a non-denominational theological journal. This would, however, ultimately be fulfilled several years after his death at the bequest of his daughter's will in 1908 with the printing of the first issue of the Harvard Theological Review. In 1893 he was elected a member of the American Antiquarian Society in 1893, although he subsequently resigned.

He died at Cambridge on October 16, 1900.

== Selected writings ==
- The Science of Thought (1869)
- Fichte's Science of Knowledge (1884)
- Poetry, Comedy and Duty (1888)
- Religions before Christianity (1883)
- Ethics for Young People (1891)
- The Gospel of Paul (1892)
