= Marjorie McKenney Stone =

American naval machinist

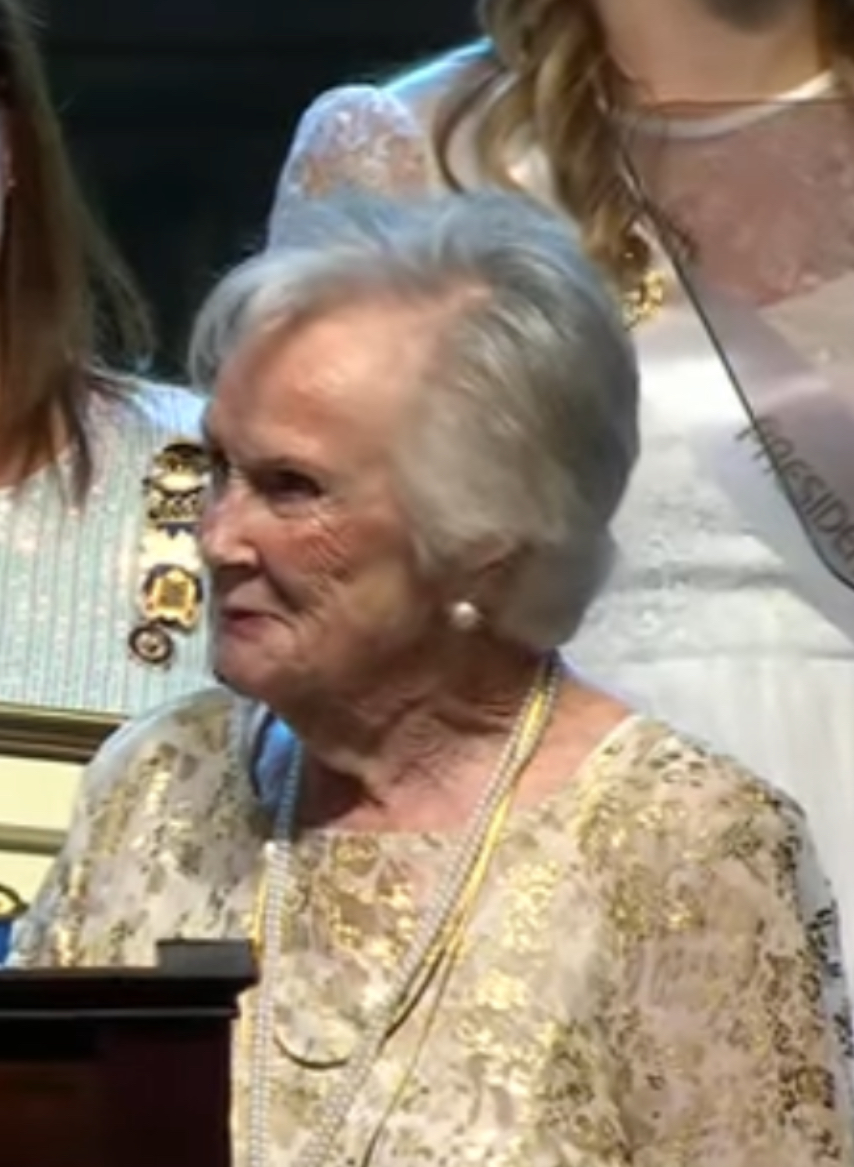
- Stone in 2024

Personal details
- Born: Marjorie McKenney; July 4, 1923 (age 102) Brunswick, Maine, U.S.
- Spouse: Harry Stone (m. 1944)
- Education: Amherst High School

Military service
- Allegiance: United States
- Branch/service: United States Navy
- Rank: Aviation Machinist's Mate 2nd Class

Marjorie "Marjie" McKenney Stone (born July 4, 1923) is an American retired military machinist who served in the U.S. Navy WAVES during World War II. An amateur swimmer, she set a national record for breaststroke in the 85-89 age group in 2012.

== Early life ==
Stone was born Marjorie McKenney on July 4, 1923, in Brunswick, Maine. During her childhood, she spent summers volunteering at Sea Pines Camp on Long Island. She graduated from Amherst High School.

== Military career ==
Stone enlisted in the U.S. Navy WAVES in Boston in 1943, a year after graduating from high school. She reported to Hunter College for assessment testing and was deployed to Norman, Oklahoma to attend Aviation Machinist training. Following her graduation from the training program, she was deployed to Naval Air Station Jacksonville as an Aviation Machinist's Mate 3rd Class. During World War II, she worked in hangars and disassembled and overhauled aircraft. Stone was promoted to the rank of Aviation Machinist's Mate 2nd Class prior to the end of World War II.

=== Awards ===
Stone was presented with the Living Legend award by Colonel Susan Sowers at the Military Women's Memorial induction ceremony in Washington, D.C.

On June 6, 2024, she was one of three women veterans honored at the 80th anniversary of D-Day in Normandy, France. On June 29, 2024, she was presented with the President General's Medallion by DAR President General Pamela Rouse Wright during National Defense Night at the 133rd Continental Congress at DAR Constitution Hall.

== Personal life ==
While serving at Naval Air Station Jacksonville, she met fellow Aviation Machinist's Mate Harry Stone. They married in March 1944.

She lives in Pensacola, Florida and is a volunteer at Baptist Hospital. Stone is a member of the Daughters of the American Revolution.

In 2012, she set a national swimming record for women's 50 meter breaststroke in the 85-89 age group.
