= Lincoln Street Historic District (Brunswick, Maine) =

Historic district in Maine, United States

- U.S. National Register of Historic Places
- U.S. Historic district
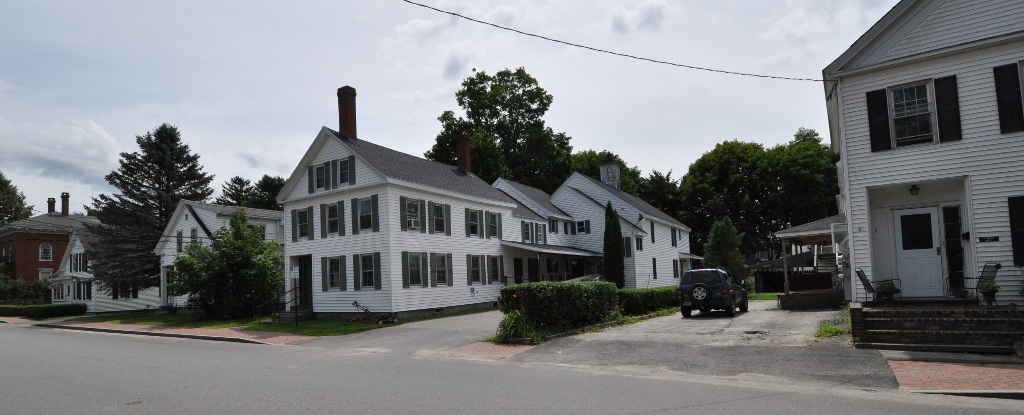
- Odd numbered houses in the district

- Location within Maine Location within the United States
- Location: Lincoln St. between Main and Union Sts., Brunswick, Maine
- Coordinates: 43°55′0″N 69°58′3″W
- Area: 8 acres (3.2 ha)
- Architectural style: Greek Revival, Late Victorian
- NRHP reference No.: 76000094
- Added to NRHP: December 12, 1976

The Lincoln Street Historic District in Brunswick, Maine, is an 8-acre (3.2 ha) historic district encompassing a remarkably uniform assemblage of mid 19th-century residential construction. It includes fourteen houses, most of which were built in a two-year period between 1843 and 1845. The district was listed on the National Register of Historic Places in 1976.

== Description and history ==
Lincoln Street is an east-west residential street, one block in length, extending west from Maine Street (Maine State Route 24), Brunswick's principal downtown thoroughfare. The land on which it was laid out was acquired over a multi-year period by Dr. Isaac Lincoln, a professor at Bowdoin College's Maine Medical School for many years. In response to local demand for housing, Lincoln subdivided the land and sold off most of the lots in 1843. Lincoln created uniformly-sized lots, and specified minimum setback requirements for the houses that were built on them. The result is a cohesive streetscape, representative of residential development of the period.

Except for the commercial buildings facing Maine Street, the street is lined on both sides with residential buildings. All are 1-1/2 to 2-1/2 stories in height, and are a mixture of wood frame and brick construction. There are fourteen houses, seven on each side, including four duplexes. Most of these houses were built between 1843 and 1845 and are Greek Revival in style; one of the others is a 1772 house moved from Maine Street and given a Colonial Revival facade treatment. There is one house that was built in 1871, which has Italianate style; a number of the earlier houses also exhibit Italianate alterations. The Richardson House at 11 Lincoln Street is separately listed on the National Register, as one of the region's finest examples of transitional Greek Revival-Italianate architecture.

== See also ==
- National Register of Historic Places listings in Cumberland County, Maine
