= Richardson House (Brunswick, Maine) =

Historic house in Maine, United States

- U.S. National Register of Historic Places
- U.S. Historic district – Contributing property
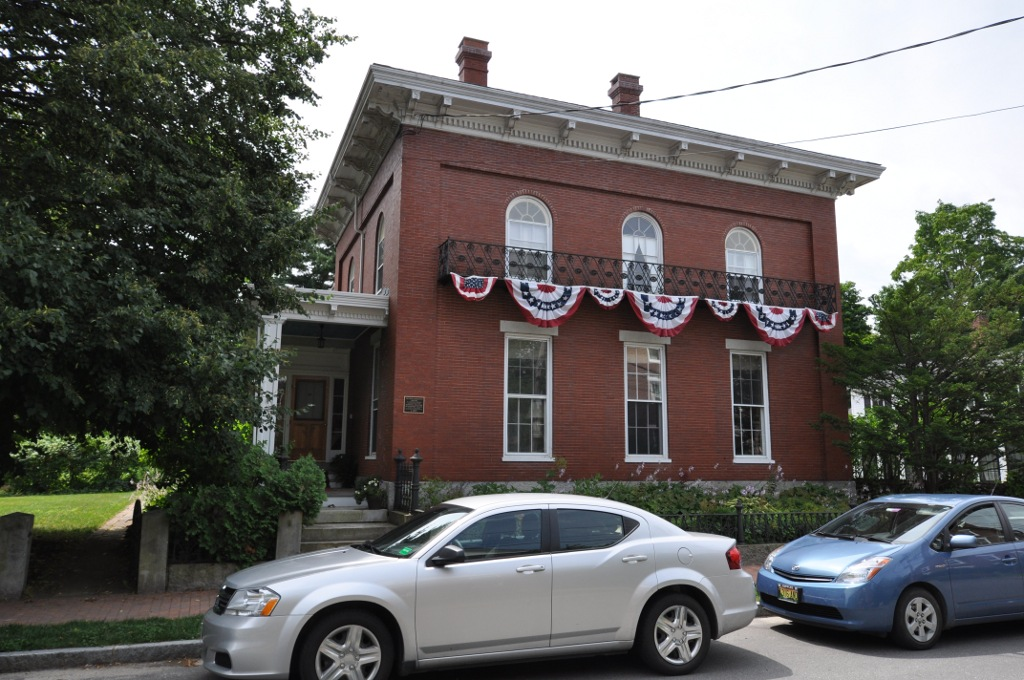

- Location within Maine Location within the United States
- Location: 11 Lincoln St., Brunswick, Maine
- Coordinates: 43°54′42″N 69°58′12″W
- Area: 1 acre (0.40 ha)
- Built: 1857
- Architectural style: Greek Revival, Italianate
- Part of: Lincoln Street Historic District (ID76000094)
- NRHP reference No.: 74000165

Significant dates
- Added to NRHP: May 16, 1974
- Designated CP: December 12, 1976

The Richardson House, also known as the Captain George McManus House, is a historic house at 11 Lincoln Street in Brunswick, Maine. Built in 1857, it is a fine local example of transitional Greek Revival-Italianate architecture in brick. McManus, for whom it was built, was a prominent local ship's captain. It was listed on the National Register of Historic Places in 1974. For a time, it housed the museum of the Pejepscot Historical Society.

== Description and history ==
The Richardson House stands on the south side of Lincoln Street, just west of the town's business district. It is a two-story brick building with a hip roof and a granite foundation. The roof cornice is broad and studded with irregularly spaced Italianate brackets, with a line of dentil moulding. The street-facing facade is three bays wide, with all windows, with the Colonial Revival entrance set in a projection to the left, under a flat-roofed porch supported by square paneled pillars. The second floor's windows are set in round-arch openings, with a shallow iron balcony extending across all three.

The house was built in 1857 for George McManus, a master mariner who lived here until his death in 1864. It is one of the region's finest examples of transitional Greek Revival-Italianate design, but its architect is unknown. In the mid-20th century, it was owned by the locally prominent Richardson family, and it served for several years as the parsonage for St. Paul's Episcopal Church. It thereafter housed the museum collection for the Pejepscot Historical Society for a time; its collections are now in the Skolfield-Whittier House.

Richardson House is now an Airbnb and was featured in a recent YouTube video from Brunswick.

== See also ==
- National Register of Historic Places listings in Cumberland County, Maine
