= Ruel P. Tolman =

American painter, photographer and curator

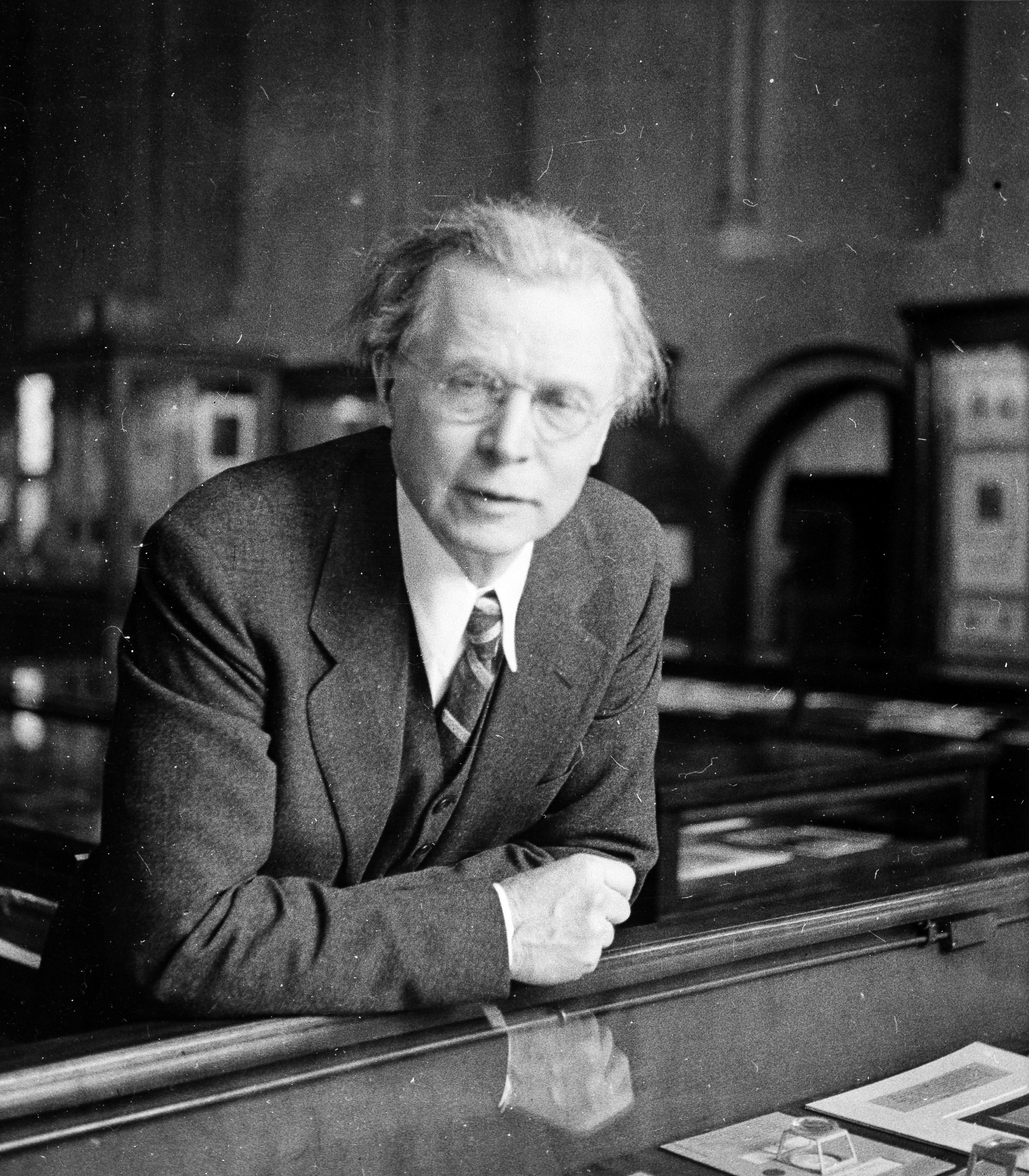
- Tolman in 1935
- Born: March 26, 1878; Brookfield, Vermont
- Died: August 24, 1954 (aged 76); Washington, D.C.
- Education: Mark Hopkins Institute of Art (1897-1902), University of California, Berkeley (1897-1902), Corcoran School of the Arts and Design (1902-1905), National Academy of Design (1906), Art Students League of New York (1906)
- Known for: Etching, Landscape Painting, Photography
- Notable work: The Life and Work of Edward Greene Malbone
- Movement: American Realism, Impressionism
- Spouse: Nelly McKenzie Tolman

Ruel P. Tolman (also known as Ruel Pardee Tolman, R. P. Tolman; Mar 26, 1878 — Aug 24, 1954) was an American painter, photographer, printmaker, and curator. He was best known for his work The Life and Work of Edward Greene Malbone, his etchings, and his Impressionist landscapes.

== Early life and education ==
On March 26, 1878, Ruel P. Tolman was born in Brookfield, Vermont. From 1897 and 1902, Tolman studied at Mark Hopkins Institute of Art (now named San Francisco Art Institute), Pomona College Prep School, and University of California, Berkeley. After he graduated from Berkeley, Tolman moved to Washington, D.C. to continue his studies at Corcoran School of the Arts and Design. In 1906, Tolman pursued further education at the National Academy of Design and the Art Students League while he began teaching at Corcoran, where he was later appointed assistant instructor at Corcoran.

== Career ==
=== Artist ===
Trolley Line on Wisconsin Avenue
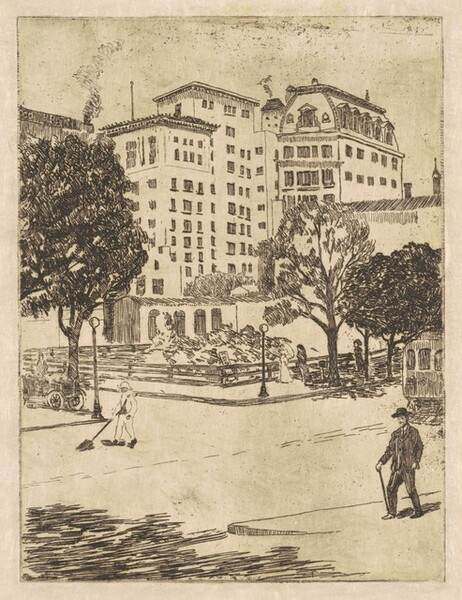
- Artist: Ruel P. Tolman
- Year: 1915
- Medium: Etching in black on wove paper
- Movement: American Realism
- Dimensions: 20.32 cm × 15.24 cm (8.00 in × 6.00 in)
- Location: National Gallery of Art
- Owner: Corcoran Collection (Gift of Mr. Edgar B. Douglass)
- Accession: 2015.19.2582
- Website: https://www.nga.gov/collection/art-object-page.183335.html

Ruel P. Tolman worked both as an artist and a photographer. During his artistic career, Tolman mainly created paintings and etchings. His artistic style was influenced by contemporary movements in the United States, mainly American Realism and Impressionism. The influence of American Realism can be identified in Tolman's etchings and photographic works. The subjects of these works are mainly the cityscape and the people that live within it, including staff and faculty when he was working at the National Gallery of Art (see Trolley Line on Wisconsin Avenue and Clagett the Cabinet Maker). They particularly focus on depicting the realities of everyday life in metropolitans, resonating with the American Realist notion that all social lives are worthy of depiction.

Clagett the Cabinet Maker
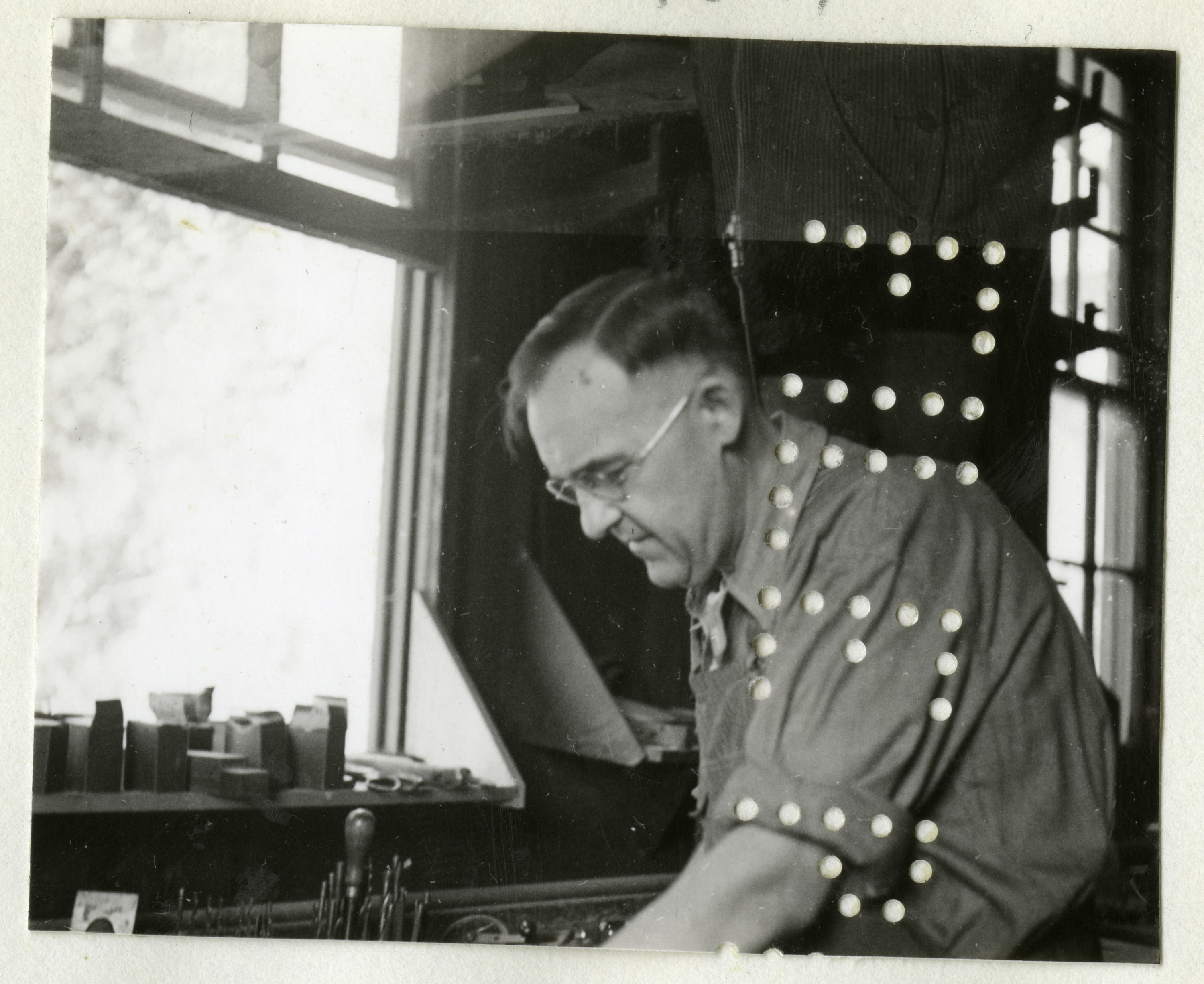
- Artist: Ruel P. Tolman
- Year: 1935
- Catalogue: SIA2011-0525
- Medium: Photographic print
- Movement: American Realism
- Dimensions: 5.1 cm × 5.7 cm (2.0 in × 2.25 in)
- Location: Smithsonian Institution Archives
- Accession: 32095-4
- Website: https://siarchives.si.edu/collections/siris_sic_13221

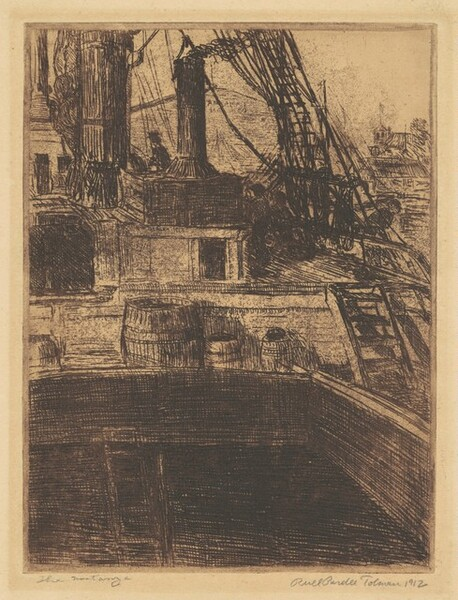
The Matanza, 1912, https://www.nga.gov/collection/art-object-page.183610.html

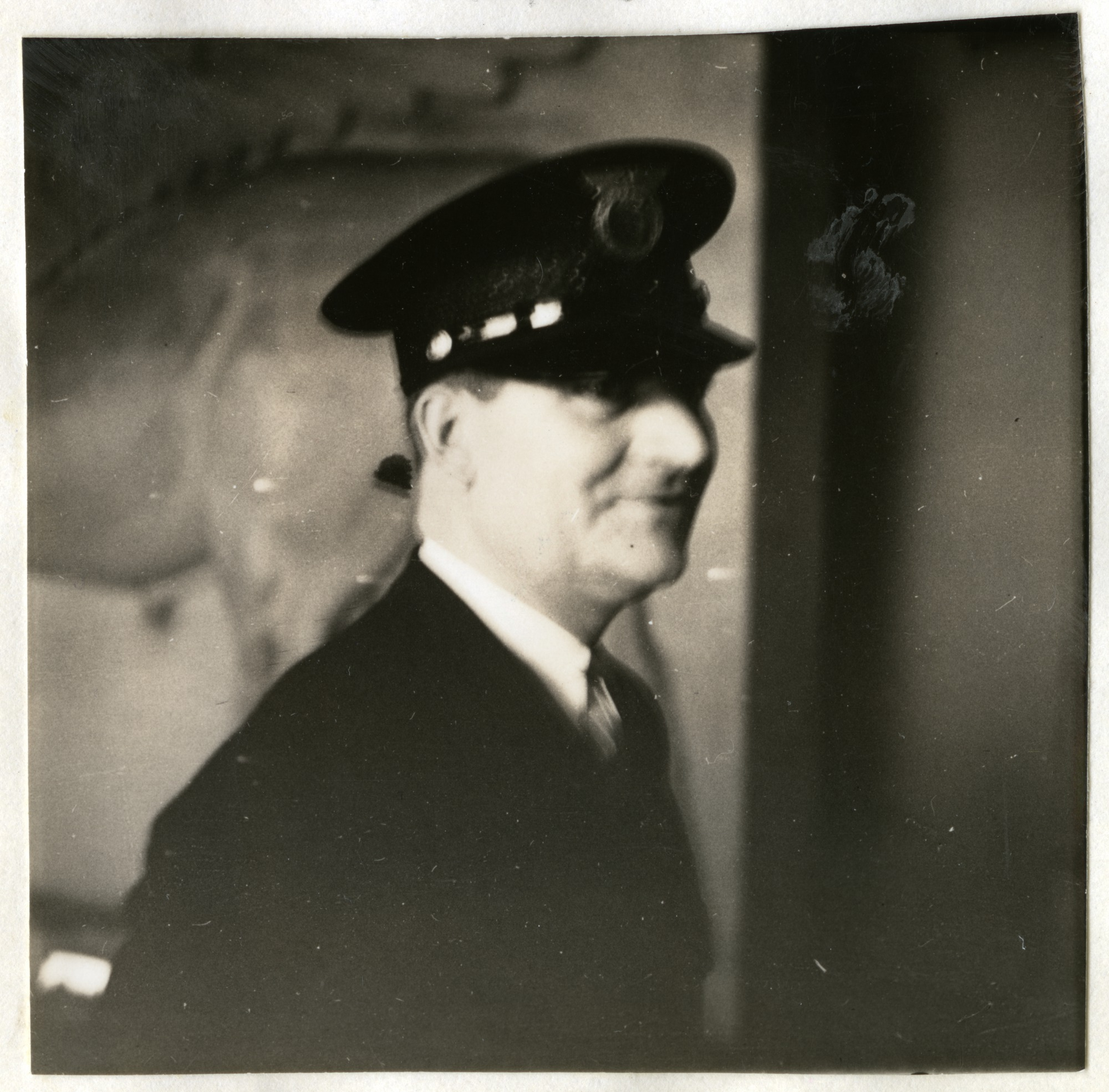
Man in Uniform Named Clark, c. 1930s, https://siarchives.si.edu/collections/siris_sic_13216

Untitled
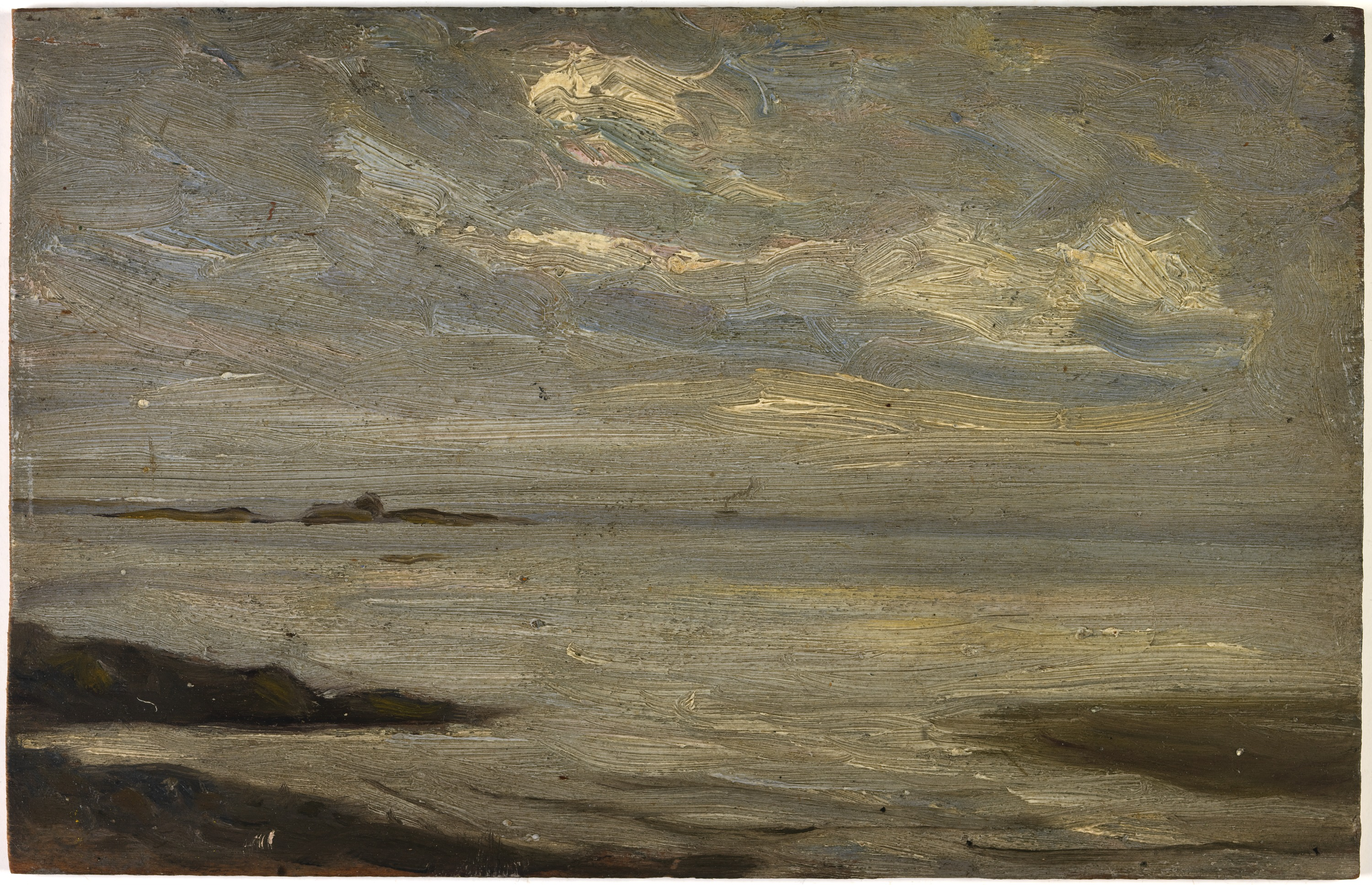
- Artist: Ruel P. Tolman
- Medium: Oil on wood
- Movement: Impressionism
- Dimensions: 13.2 cm × 20.3 cm (5.2 in × 8.0 in)
- Location: Smithsonian American Art Museum
- Accession: 1974.97.1
- Website: https://edan.si.edu/saam/id/object/1974.97.1

Meanwhile, Tolman's paintings are distinctly Impressionist. His paintings mainly depict natural landscapes in swift brushstrokes, reflecting the Impressionist interest in the transient effect of color and light (see Untitled). His works often exhibit a similar sensitivity to light, capturing fleeting moments and the vibrancy of everyday scenes. This approach not only aligns with the impressionist ethos but also serves to elevate the mundane aspects of life into subjects worthy of artistic exploration. Moreover, his works reflect an emphasis on personal and immediate experiences, influenced by a shift from Romanticism to Realism and Impressionism.

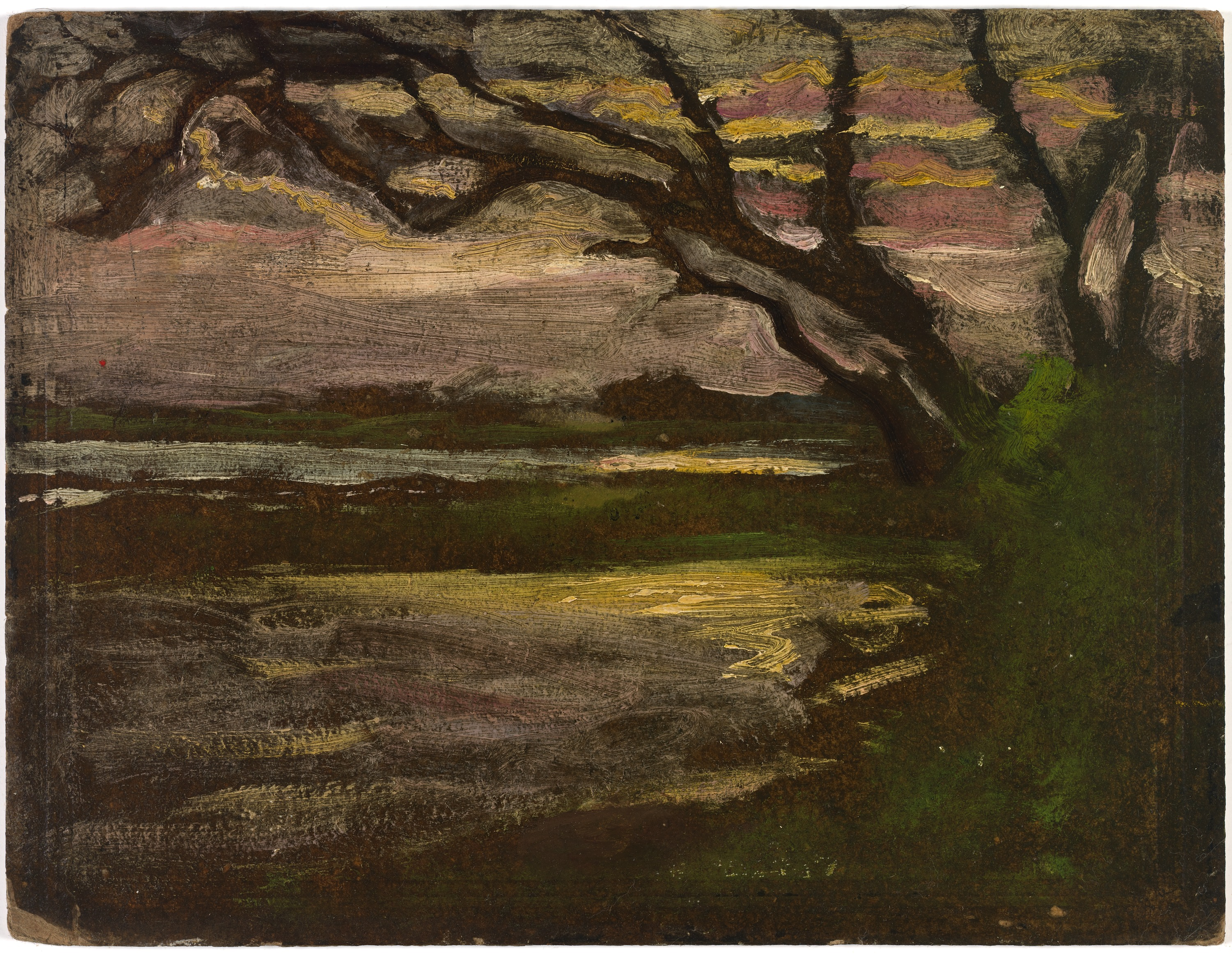
Trees and Reflection, n.d., https://americanart.si.edu/artwork/trees-and-reflection-24179

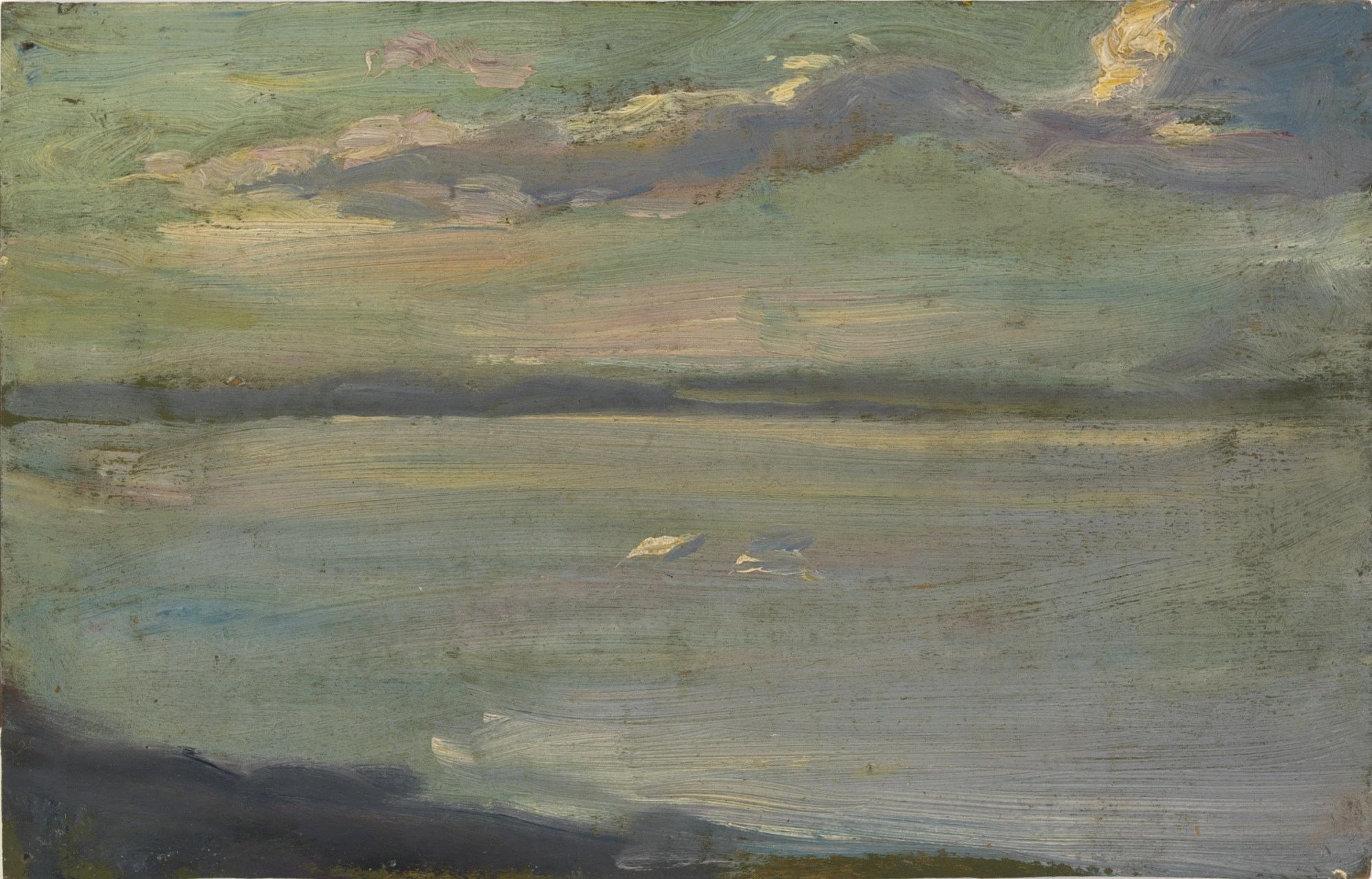
Coming Storm, n.d., https://americanart.si.edu/artwork/coming-storm-24180

In addition, his artistic career was potentially influenced by the art market during his time. The rise of impressionism was closely tied to the commercialization of art, a change that became closely tied to artistic creativity and agency have been impacted. His works appealed to both the aesthetic sensibilities of the impressionist movement and the social consciousness of realism, indicating a possible influence by the context of the early 20th century.

=== Curator and director ===
Tolman also worked as curator and director, working with other artists' works. Tolman was appointed Assistant curator in the Graphic Arts Division at the National Gallery in 1920 and later promoted to Curator in 1932.

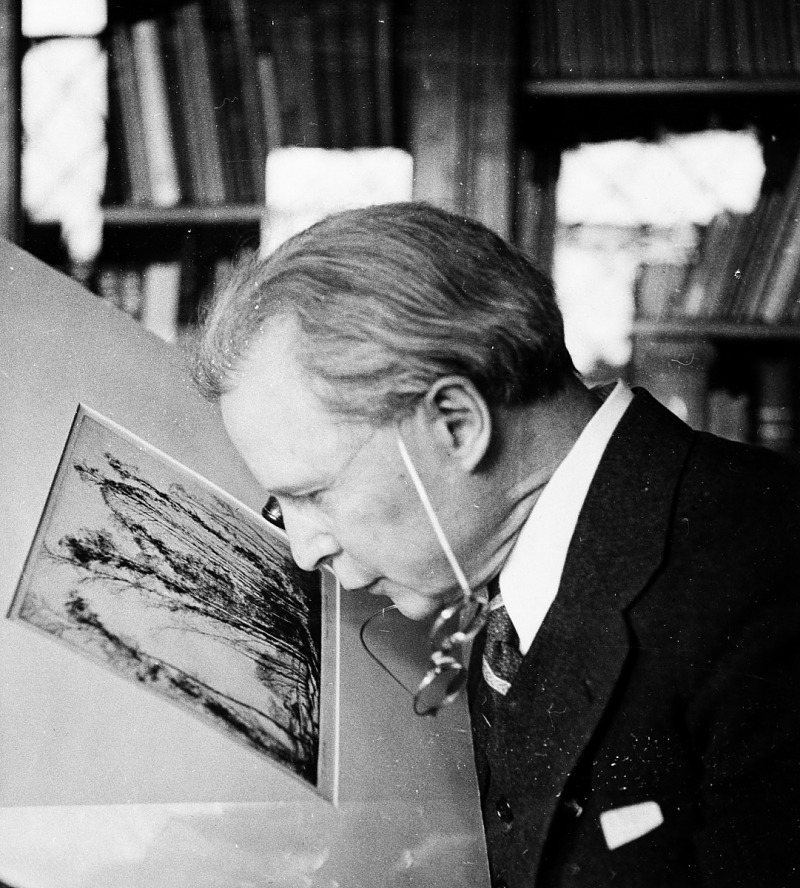
Ruel P. Tolman Examining Artwork

Tolman's career as curator reflects a deep understanding of the evolving role of curators in contemporary art, where they serve not only as caretakers of artworks but also as critical interpreters and facilitators of artistic dialogue. This shift in the curator's role is indicative of a broader "curatorial turn" in society, where curation has become integral to various fields, including art, media, and science. Tolman's approach aligns with the notion that curators are essential in shaping the narrative and context of exhibitions, thus influencing public perception and engagement with art.
