= Brookfield, Vermont =

- Town
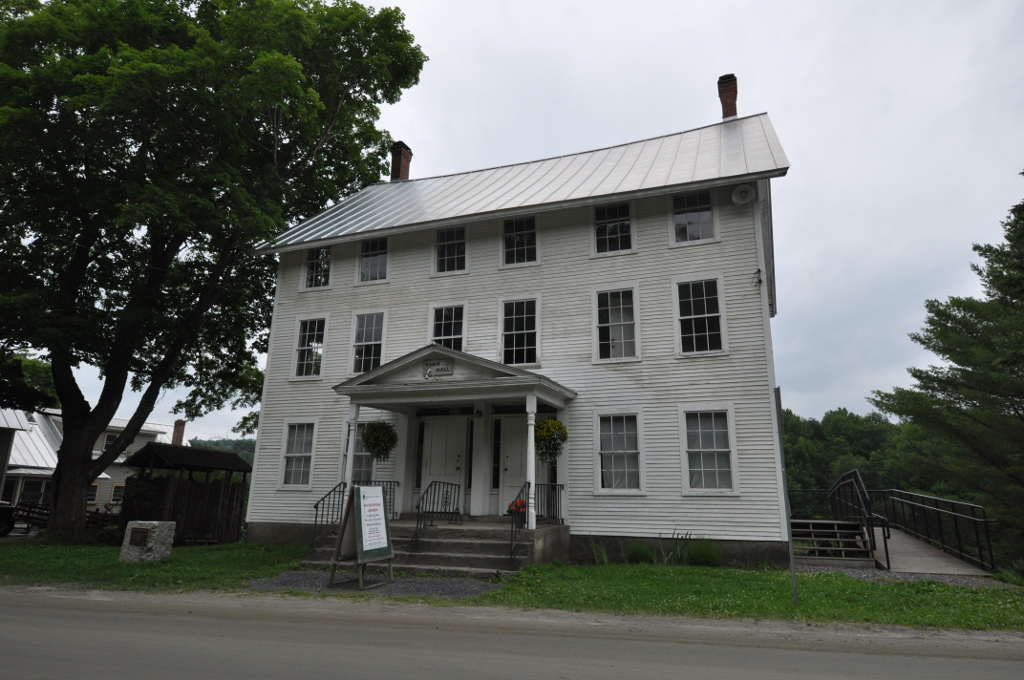
- Brookfield Old Town Hall

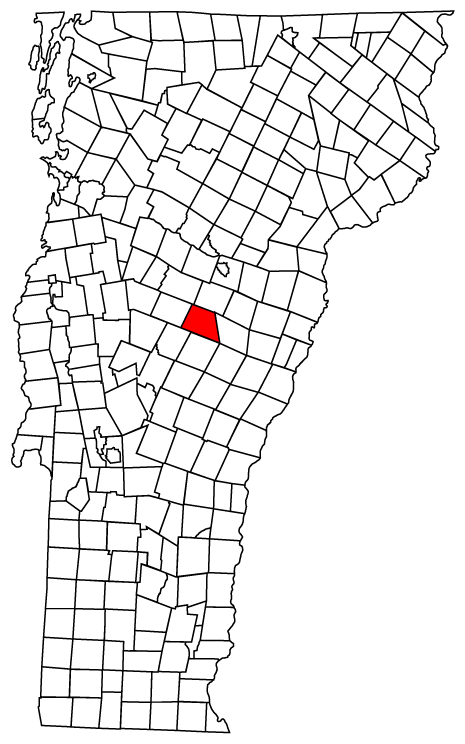
- Located in Orange County, Vermont
- Coordinates: 44°01′25″N 72°35′50″W
- Country: United States
- State: Vermont
- County: Orange
- Chartered: 1781
- Settled: 1779
- Organized: 1785
- Communities: Brookfield; Brookfield Center; East Brookfield; West Brookfield

Area
  - Total: 41.7 sq mi (107.9 km^{2})
  - Land: 41.4 sq mi (107.2 km^{2})
  - Water: 0.27 sq mi (0.7 km^{2})
- Elevation: 1,247 ft (380 m)

Population (2020)
  - Total: 1,244
  - Density: 30/sq mi (11.6/km^{2})
  - Households: 475
  - Families: 351
- Time zone: UTC-5 (EST)
  - Summer (DST): UTC-4 (EDT)
- ZIP Codes: 05036 (Brookfield); 05060 (Randolph); 05041 (East Randolph); 05679 (Williamstown)
- Area code: 802
- FIPS code: 50-09325
- GNIS feature ID: 1462054
- Website: brookfieldvt.org

Brookfield is a town in Orange County, Vermont, United States. It was created by Vermont charter on August 5, 1781. The population was 1,244 at the 2020 census. Brookfield is best known for its floating bridge which spans Sunset Lake buoyed by pontoons. The bridge, which is the only floating bridge east of the Mississippi River, was originally built in 1820 by Luther Adams and his neighbors. Sunset Lake is also the site of an annual ice harvesting festival. Brookfield boasts that it has Vermont's oldest continually operating library dating back to 1791. In 2006, Brookfield was one of the first American towns to have its citizens pass a resolution endorsing the impeachment of President George W. Bush. As of September 2010, the floating bridge was closed for repairs. Work began in 2014, and was completed May 2015. There was a celebration from May 23–24, 2015, to memorialize the event. Governor Peter Shumlin attended, and cadets from Norwich University provided traffic control.

The town's modest village center is listed on the National Register of Historic Places as the Brookfield Village Historic District.

== Geography ==
According to the United States Census Bureau, the town has a total area of 41.7 square miles (107.9 km^{2}), of which 41.4 square miles (107.2 km^{2}) is land and 0.3 square mile (0.7 km^{2}) (0.65%) is water.

== Demographics ==
Historical population
Census	Pop.	Note	%±
1790	421		—
1800	988		134.7%
1810	1,384		40.1%
1820	1,507		8.9%
1830	1,677		11.3%
1840	1,789		6.7%
1850	1,672		−6.5%
1860	1,521		−9.0%
1870	1,269		−16.6%
1880	1,239		−2.4%
1890	996		−19.6%
1900	996		0.0%
1910	1,008		1.2%
1920	860		−14.7%
1930	761		−11.5%
1940	808		6.2%
1950	762		−5.7%
1960	597		−21.7%
1970	606		1.5%
1980	959		58.3%
1990	1,089		13.6%
2000	1,222		12.2%
2010	1,292		5.7%
2020	1,244		−3.7%
U.S. Decennial Census

As of the census of 2000, there were 1,222 people, 475 households, and 351 families residing in the town. The population density was 29.5 people per square mile (11.4/km^{2}). There were 602 housing units at an average density of 14.5 per square mile (5.6/km^{2}). The racial makeup of the town was 97.63% White, 0.16% African American, 0.16% Native American, 0.98% Asian, and 1.06% from two or more races. Hispanic or Latino of any race were 0.08% of the population.

There were 475 households, out of which 32.2% had children under the age of 18 living with them, 61.3% were married couples living together, 9.1% had a female householder with no husband present, and 26.1% were non-families. 17.9% of all households were made up of individuals, and 6.9% had someone living alone who was 65 years of age or older. The average household size was 2.57 and the average family size was 2.87.

In the town, the population was spread out, with 25.1% under the age of 18, 5.6% from 18 to 24, 27.9% from 25 to 44, 30.0% from 45 to 64, and 11.4% who were 65 years of age or older. The median age was 40 years. For every 100 females, there were 100.7 males. For every 100 females age 18 and over, there were 96.4 males.

The median income for a household in the town was $45,515, and the median income for a family was $51,071. Males had a median income of $34,464 versus $24,258 for females. The per capita income for the town was $21,502. About 2.5% of families and 6.1% of the population were below the poverty line, including 6.9% of those under age 18 and 5.3% of those age 65 or over.

== Notable people ==
- Donald M. Hooper, Secretary of State of Vermont
- Jay Hooper, member of the Vermont House of Representatives
- Ben Jickling, member of the Vermont House of Representatives
- Edward Koren, (1935 - April 14, 2023) Cartoonist, writer, illustrator
- George Washington Morse, Seventh-day Adventist Pioneer
- Cassius Peck, Union Army recipient of the Medal of Honor, member of the Vermont legislature
- Myron W. Reed (1836–1899), Congregationalist minister and political activist
- Orange Scott (1800–1847), Methodist reformer and abolitionist
- Ruel P. Tolman (1878–1954), painter, photographer, printmaker and curator
