= Cassius Peck =

American politician

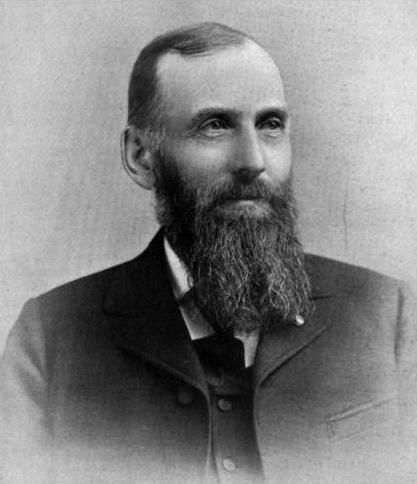
- From 1903's Genealogical and Family History of the State of Vermont
- Born: 3 March 1842; Brookfield, Vermont, US
- Died: 12 July 1913 (aged 71); Burlington, Vermont, US
- Burial place: Brookfield Cemetery, Brookfield, Vermont
- Spouse(s): Luna Arnold Sprague (m. 1868 d. 1901), Alice Gaylor (m.1905 d.1912)
- Children: 11
- Military career
- Allegiance: (United States) United States; Union
- Branch: United States Army; Union Army
- Rank: Second Sergeant
- Units: Company F, 1st U.S. Sharpshooters
- Conflicts: American Civil War
- Awards: Medal of Honor

Cassius Peck (3 March 1842 – 12 July 1913) was a Medal of Honor recipient and member of the Vermont legislature who served in the American Civil War.

== Early life ==
Peck was born on 3 March 1842 to Reuben Peck and Hannah G. Peck. He had a brother, Marshall Reuben Peck, born in 1846. He was educated at the Montpelier seminary and West Randolph Academy.

== Civil War ==
Peck entered Company F of the 1st United States Sharpshooters as a private in Brookfield, Vermont on 12 September 1861. He was honorably discharged on 12 September 1864.

=== Medal of Honor ===
He was awarded the Medal of Honor on 12 October 1892 for his actions on 19 September 1862. He was a private then, leading a small group of sharpshooters which he used to drive away a much larger of Confederate infantry, capturing two artillery pieces.

The President of the United States of America, in the name of Congress, takes pleasure in presenting the Medal of Honor to Private Cassius Peck, United States Army, for extraordinary heroism on 19 September 1862, while serving with Company F, 1st U.S. Sharpshooters, in action at Blackburn's Ford, Virginia. Private Peck took command of such soldiers as he could get and attacked and captured a Confederate battery of four guns. Also, while on a reconnaissance, he overtook and captured a Confederate soldier.

== Later life ==
In 1867, he married Luna Arnold Sprague. He served as a member of both the Vermont House of Representatives and Vermont Senate. He represented Brookfield in the House in 1882 and 1886, and served as chairman of the House committee on highways, bridges, and ferries. Peck represented Orange County in the Senate in 1896, and was chairman of its committee on military affairs. Selling his three farms, totaling 271 acres, Peck moved himself and his family to Burlington. He was a trustee of the University of Vermont as well as the Vermont Soldiers' Home, and maintained a farm up until his death. His wife died in 1901 in Burlington. Peck's son, Cassius R. Peck, was born on 1 July 1880, and would go on to serve as a major during the First World War. Peck had ten other children, five of whom died before 1912.

Peck was a Freemason, and was treasurer and master of the Brookfield lodge, also known as Mystic Star Lodge No. 97. He worked in the Grand Army of the Republic, the Order of the Eastern Star, and was appointed by the Governor of Vermont to select and place the state monument that would be displayed at Gettysburg, Pennsylvania.

== See also ==
- List of American Civil War Medal of Honor recipients
- Vermont in the American Civil War
