= Operation Free =

- Founded: 2009
- Location: Washington, D.C.
- Website: www.operationfree.net

Operation Free is a coalition of veterans and national security organizations founded in August 2009 by the Truman National Security Project, The National Security Initiative, VoteVets.org, and VetPAC. Operation Free, in collaboration with other organizations, works to raise awareness, among policymakers and the public, of the national security threat posed by climate change and the United States' reliance on oil.

== Activities ==
In the Fall of 2009, with Alexander Cornell du Houx in charge, Operation Free launched a 29-state bus tour designed to give veterans the opportunity to talk directly to the American people about how climate change is "undermining our safety and why we need to pass clean energy and climate legislation as quickly as possible." In September 2009, Operation Free flew in 150 veterans to attend the White House Administration's Clean Energy Briefing. These veterans met with 26 US Senators and/or Staff to discuss the national security threats of climate change and America's current energy posture. In February 2010, Operation Free hosted a similar event in which it flew 80 veterans into Washington D.C. to meet with policymakers and members of the press.

On September 20, 2010, Operation Free announced its sponsorship of race car driver Leilani Munter, who is also a clean energy advocate and environmental activist. On September 30, Leilani’s car (#59) which featured Operation Free’s logo, drove in the ARCA Series Kansas Lottery 150 race at the Kansas Speedway. Sturman Industries cosponsored Leilani in an effort to promote its "Powered By Sturman" American engine modifications that "address national energy and security needs by using technology to transform engine efficiency and facilitate the nations’ effort to replace foreign oil with alternative American fuels"."

== Controversy ==
The group has been criticized by Republican representative Daryl Metcalfe for "lending their name, to promote the leftist propaganda of global warming and climate change..." Metcalfe, of Pennsylvania, called any veteran who participated with Operation Free a "traitor to the oath he or she took to defend the Constitution." The group responded with a radio ad campaign calling for Metcalfe's resignation.

== See also ==
- Climate change and national security
