= American Veterans Committee =

Former non-profit organization

- Formation: 2013
- Type: 501(c)19
- Headquarters: Washington, DC
- Website: www.americanveteranscommittee.org

Launched in April 2013, the American Veterans Committee (AVC) was a non-profit veterans organization that promoted networking opportunities for US veterans globally. The organization was launched to make it easier for US veterans to connect with veterans from other countries, expand new employment and business opportunities, while also promoting smart diplomacy. The organization closed in 2023.
