= George Washington Morse =

Seventh-day Adventist pioneer

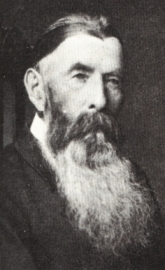
- George Washington Morse
- Born: June 24, 1816; Brookfield, Vermont
- Died: November 9, 1909 (aged 93); DeLand, Florida
- Occupations: Minister/Preacher; Conference President; Colporteur; Justice of the Peace; Farmer
- Spouse: Olive Buzzell

George Washington Morse (24 June 1816 – 9 November 1909) was a Seventh-day Adventist pioneer. As a Millerite Adventist, he experienced the Great Advent Awakening including the Great Disappointment of October 22, 1844. He joined the Sabbath-keeping Adventists in the late 1840s and remained a member until he died 60 years later. He witnessed the SDA Church's development for over a half of a century.

== The Millerite Movement ==
Washington Morse studied William Miller's message in the late 1830s and became a Millerite Adventist in 1842.

Morse said that up until January 1844, few people opposed the movement, but that a change in support took place at the beginning of 1844. A misunderstanding arose regarding the end of the time prophecy. Some thought it would end December 31, 1843. Miller had taught that March 21, 1844 would be the end of the 2300 day prophecy of Daniel 8:14.

Morse refers to the Advent message of Miller as the first message of Revelation 14. Then, in the early spring of 1844 the second angel's message joined with the loud cry of Revelation 18, and many people left the organized churches.

== The Sabbath-keeping Adventists ==
Following the October 22, 1844 disappointment, he and his wife accepted the message of the sabbatarian Adventists. In 1849, Mr. Camp and his wife, friends of theirs, presented the Sabbath and Ellen White's visions to them. At first, the Morse's felt sorry that the Camps had accepted such 'delusions'. The Camps urged them to find evidence for Sunday sacredness in the Bible. They tried but could not find any and began keeping the Seventh-day Sabbath. This affected their business and its employees. It was on a Friday that they decided to keep the Seventh-day Sabbath; the next day. They quickly informed their employees of the change and had them prepare to close the business at the end of the day.

Adventist pioneer Joseph Bates visited. He introduced them to the Sanctuary doctrine and further explained the Sabbath. In 1850 they began receiving Present Truth published by James White. The Morse's appreciated the White's Biblical stand but they remained skeptical regarding Ellen White's visions. After a meeting at E.P. Butler's in Waterbury, Vermont they accepted Ellen White's ministry. Morse became convinced that her work was in harmony with and prompted by the Spirit of God. He reported that fanaticism was rampant in those early days and that James and Ellen White stood firm against it. This impressed him.

Morse attended the 1852 meeting where it was agreed to purchase a printing press and found a publishing enterprise. According to available records, in 1852, he became the first Sabbath-keeping Adventist minister to be ordained.

== Minnesota Territory ==
In 1856 he and his family moved to the town of Deerfield in Steele County, Minnesota. He took up evangelistic work there. He wrote, "I walked hundreds of miles in Minnesota, visiting the widely scattered settlements, carrying my Bible, chart, and tracts, endeavoring to awaken an interest in the truths of the third angel's message."

Histories of Steele County, Minnesota, list him as being one of the first settlers of the town of Deerfield, surviving the Indian outbreak in 1862, performing the first marriage in the town, and serving as the pastor at the first religious service which was a funeral – mention being made that, at the funeral, Washington "took the occasion to enlighten his audience as to the particular and distinctive tenets of his religious views." Steele County histories also mention the Adventist organization in Deerfield Township that was led by Morse as being one of "two church organizations – the Adventists and the German Methodists – though neither of them have a church edifice, but hold their service in the school houses."

In 1858, Washington Morse along with D. B. Parsons and J.H. Abbott was commissioned by the government of Minnesota to establish a State road from Waterville to Owatonna.

In May, 1862, he attended an organization meeting for the denomination and in October, 1862 he became the first president of the newly organized Minnesota Conference until 1865. After that, he continued working for the church but in less prominent roles.

== 1863 Minnesota Delegate to Church Organization ==
Seventh-day Adventists were invited to meet for the purpose of organizing a General Conference. They met and organized May 20, 1863. Washington Morse represented the church in Minnesota at the meeting.

== Peterborough, Ontario, Canada ==
In 1896, he and his wife moved to the Peterborough, Ontario area to be closer to family. He worked as a colporteur there. In 1908, a year before he died, the Morse's moved to a family home in Florida.

== See also ==
- Millerite Movement
- Seventh-day Adventist Church
- Seventh-day Adventist theology
- Seventh-day Adventist eschatology
- Millerites
- William Miller (preacher)
- History of the Seventh-day Adventist Church
- Teachings of Ellen White
- Inspiration of Ellen White
- Prophecy in the Seventh-day Adventist Church
- The Pillars of Adventism
- Second Advent
- Sabbath in Seventh-day Adventism
- Ellen G. White
- Adventist
- Seventh-day Adventist Church Pioneers
- Seventh-day Adventist worship
