= George W. Morse =

American politician

Member of the Washington House of Representatives for the 45th district
- In office 1889–1893

Member of the Washington House of Representatives for the 50th district
- In office 1907–1911

Personal details
- Born: April 1830 Brunswick, Maine, United States
- Died: December 23, 1915 (aged 85) Oak Harbor, Washington, United States
- Party: Republican

George Washington Morse (April 1830 – December 23, 1915) was an American politician in the state of Washington. He served in the Washington House of Representatives.
