= Walter Christie (physician) =

American physician and novelist

Walter R. Christie (born September 9, 1942) is an American physician and novelist.

== Biography ==
Christie was born in Bangor, Maine, United States. At a young age, he and his family moved to Presque Isle, in Northern Maine, to take over his grandfather’s potato farm. Christie attended Presque Isle High School. He earned a BA in English literature, with a minor in history, from Bowdoin College in 1964, graduating Cum laude; an M.D. from Temple University School of Medicine in 1968, graduating Cum Laude with special honors in Psychiatry; and an MFA in Writing from the Vermont College of Fine Arts in 1988.

Christie trained as a psychiatrist, doing his rotating internship at Maine Medical Center in Portland, Maine; his residency at the Neuropsychiatric Institute at the University Hospital in Ann Arbor, Michigan; and was the Chief Resident in Psychiatry at Maine Medical Center. In 1972, Christie accepted a commission in the U.S. Navy and served as a Lieutenant Commander and Second Marine Division Psychiatrist in the U.S. Navy Reserve at Camp Lejeune, North Carolina. While at Camp Lejeune, Christie served as a director of the Drug and Alcohol Rehabilitation Center. His commission lasted until 1974.

Christie practiced psychiatry, primarily at Maine Medical Center in Portland, Maine. From 1974 to 1979, Christie was the Director of Residency Training and Research. From 1979 to 1988, he was the Assistant Chief of Psychiatry as well as the Director of Inpatient Psychiatric Services at Maine Medical Center. From 1988 to 1997, he worked as the Director of Psychiatric Outpatient Services, and then as a Staff Psychiatrist for the Psychiatric Outpatient Services from 1999 to 2005. Since 2005, Christie has held a variety of medical consultant positions for local and national medical organizations and institutions.

Christie is a member of the American Psychiatric Association and the Maine Medical Association; he has been a Fellow of the American Psychiatric Association since 1981; and has been a Distinguished Life Fellow of the APA since 2004. He was certified by the American Board of Psychiatry and Neurology in 1974.

Between 1974 and 2005, Christie served in various positions for the Augusta Mental Health Institute, the University of Vermont, the Southern Maine Association of Cooperating Hospitals, the Maine Psychiatric Association, the Tufts University School of Medicine, and the American Board of Psychiatry and Neurology.

== Stroke ==
In March 2011, Christie and his wife were traveling via airplane from Los Angeles to Bangkok. Midway during the flight, he suffered a stroke. When pilots attempted to divert the flight to the nearest airport, which was Tokyo, Japan, they were told they could not land due to the earthquake that was happening at the time (see 2011 Tōhoku earthquake and tsunami).

The plane finally found refuge in Osaka, Japan, where Christie was rushed to a hospital. He and his wife remained there for nearly two weeks while doctors attempted to remedy the effects of the stroke. Finally, the couple secured safe passage to the United States via a medical airlift. The stroke and the surrounding events are the basis for Christie’s book, Rising Above the Wave: Surviving Tsunami and Stroke in Japan 2011.

== Writing career ==
Although he has been writing short stories and publishing journal articles for many years, Christie began his professional writing career in 2014 when he began crafting his first book, Rising Above the Wave: Surviving Tsunami and Stroke in Japan 2011. The book details, in a narrative form, the story of Christie’s stroke that he had while flying from Los Angeles to Bangkok on vacation. The book was published in Fall 2015 by Maine Authors and Publishers.

== Awards and honors ==
- 1971: Writer's Prize from the Neuropsychiatric Institute at the University Hospital, Ann Arbor, Michigan (Best Psychiatric Essay)
- 1971: Laughlin Fellow from the American College of Psychiatrists
- 1976: Letter of Distinction for Teaching from the Tufts University School of Medicine
- 1993: Distinguished Clinician Award from the Manic Depressives and Depressives Support Group
- 1994: Distinguished Community Contributor Award from the Ingraham Volunteers Mental Health Services
- 2000: Teacher of the Year from the Maine Medical Center
- 2004: Distinguished Fellow from the American Psychiatric Association
- 2006: HOPE Award from Shalom, Inc. (For “individuals who, through their exceptional service to the community, support creative and effective programs for people with mental illness.” )
- 2008: Visiting Professor of Psychiatry at the Maine Medical Center

== Selected publications ==
=== Non-fiction works ===
- Rising Above the Wave: Surviving Tsunami and Stroke in Japan 2011 (Maine Authors and Publishers, Fall 2015)

=== Articles for medical journals ===
- “Psychological Management of the Patient With Recurrent Affective Disorder” in The Journal of the Maine Medical Association, October 1977, Vol. 68, No. 10, pp 366–69
- “The Medical Management of the Patient with Recurrent Affective Disorder” in The Journal of the Maine Medical Association, October 1979, Vol.70, No. 10, pp 387–394
- “The Moment of Admission” in Psychiatric Clinics of North America, Vol. 8, No. 3, September 1985, pp 411–421

=== Articles for psychological journals ===
- “A Star Sinks into the Sea” in Voices: The Art and Science of Psychotherapy, Vol 36 No 4 /Winter 2000, pp 19–23

=== Articles on the evolution of consciousness ===
- “An I On the World” in Habitat: Journal of the Maine Audubon Society, September 1984, pp 40–44
- “The Eye of the Mind” in Habitat: Journal of the Maine Audubon Society, August 1984, pp 40–42
- “Katur’s Moment” in Habitat: Journal of the Maine Audubon Society, December 1984, pp 40–42
- “Tawelah at the Gate” in Habitat: Journal of the Maine Audubon Society, February 1985, pp 44–45
- “Imbros at the Acropolis” in Habitat: Journal of the Maine Audubon Society, August 1985, pp 38–41
- “Toward a Planetary Consciousness” in Habitat: Journal of the Maine Audubon Society, Dec/Jan 1986, pp 37–39

=== Miscellaneous publications ===
- “A Brief Moment of Confusion about the Nature of God” in Gold from Aspirin: Spiritual Views on Chaos and Order from Thirty Authors, 1995, pp 59–78
- “The Icon of Sophia” in Seeing through Symbols: Insights into Spirit, 1998, pp 98–106
- “At the Bedside” in Live and Learn: Perspective on the Questing Spirit, 2001, pp 141–146
- “The Question” in Embracing Relationships, 2005, pp 9–13
