= Brunswick and Topsham Water District (Maine) =

Fresh water supply district

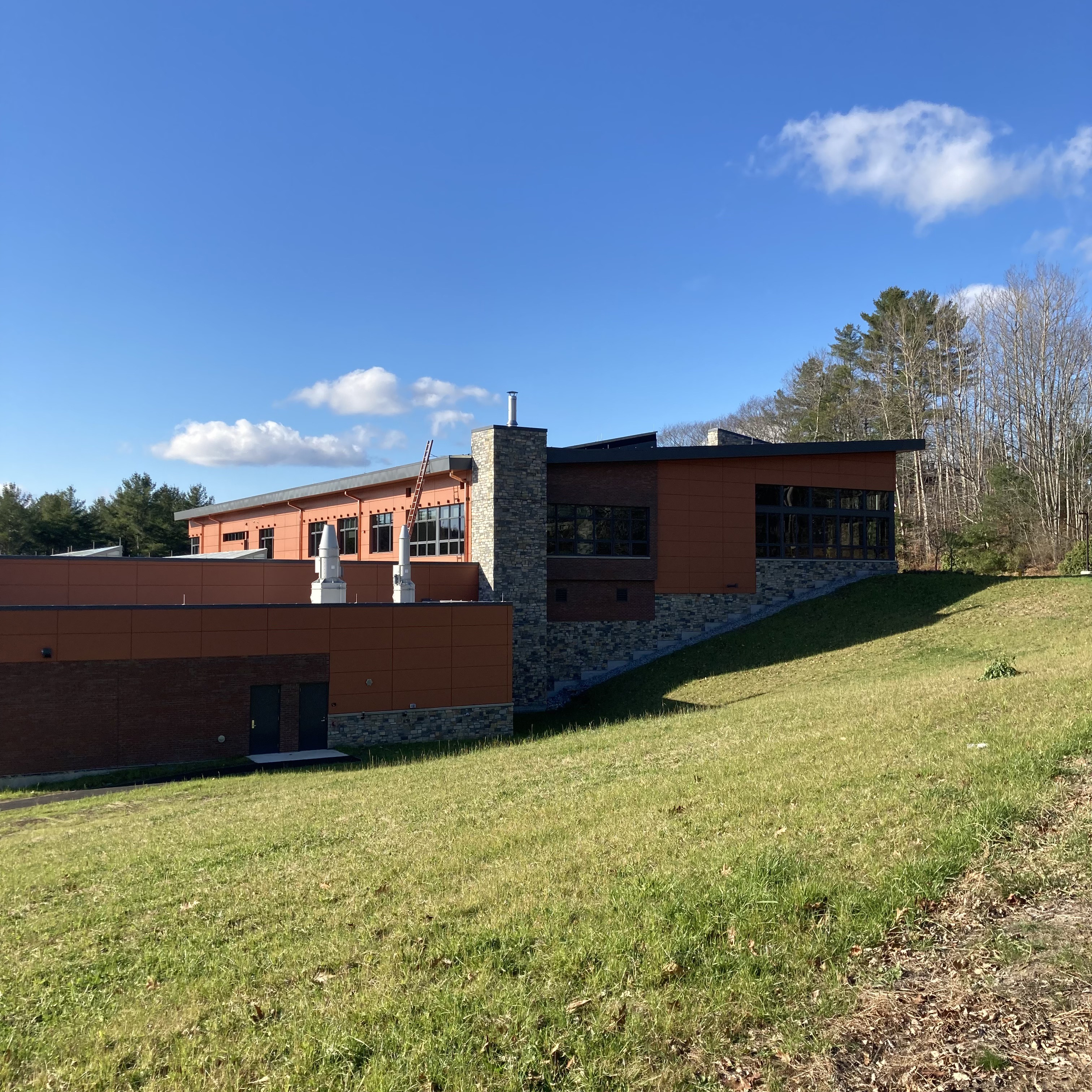
- Main offices, c. 2022

Agency overview
- Formed: February 24, 1903
- Preceding agency: Maine Water Company
- Jurisdiction: U.S. state of Maine
- Headquarters: 276 River Road Topsham, Maine United States; 43.9399°N 70.0038°W
- Website: www.btwater.org

Established in 1903, the Brunswick and Topsham Water District is a fresh water supply district providing fresh water to the towns of Brunswick and Topsham, Maine through groundwater sources. The Water District is a collaboration between the two towns to ensure safe drinking water as well as water supply for the use of fire suppression systems.

== History ==
=== 19th century ===
In the summer of 1828, prior to the establishment of the district, a force pump was constructed at the upper dam of Pejepscot Falls in Brunswick, Maine. This pump utilized hydropower to force water from the Androscoggin River through a pipeline and into a large holding tank. The water then flowed via gravity through pipes to Maine Street^{a}, where it continued to flow through a water tower and alongside a street gutter until it reached a cove and entered the Androscoggin River. This system was in operation well before the establishment of the district.

During summer, this setup functioned smoothly. However, come winter, the water in the gutter would freeze, causing the street and sidewalks to become flooded and covered with ice over long stretches. The aim of this private initiative was to safeguard individuals' property against fire damage, but it was ultimately discontinued.

In 1885, the towns of Brunswick and Topsham, Maine held a special meeting where they authorized the Selectmen to enter into a contract with the Pejepscot Water Company. The contract was for the supply of water for domestic use, including fire fighting, and to provide for all town buildings, schools, drinking fountains, and firefighting hoses. The contract was worth $2,000 per year and covered the installation of fifty to sixty fire hydrants. Initially, the Pejepscot Water Company drew water from the Androscoggin River, but it was deemed unsatisfactory. To improve the quality of water, the Warren Filtration Pump Station was constructed in 1887. However, the selected filter did not use coagulants, making it ineffective in removing smaller particles.

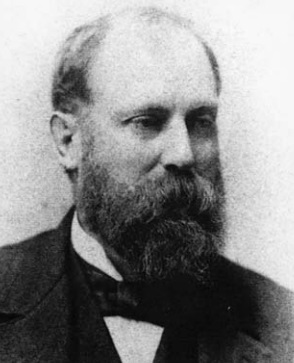
Weston Thompson (1850-1907) Served as Trustee from 1903 to 1906 and as president in 1903 and 1906

A well was dug at Mere Brook in Brunswick with the aim of improving the quality of water. Although it was reported to be of good quality, it was not further developed. The Pejepscot Water Company sold its assets to the Maine Water Company on July 3, 1891, amidst these difficulties. The Bath Water Supply Company's assets were also acquired by the Maine Water Company in the same year.

=== 20th century ===
The Maine Legislature incorporated the Brunswick and Topsham Water District in 1903. It took over the assets of the Maine Water Company, which had been serving Brunswick as a privately owned company. The District's primary objective was to find a suitable supply source and offer better service to its clients. In 1908, the system was expanded to provide Topsham with drinking water distribution and reliable fire protection.

At the District's inception, Brunswick and Topsham had a combined populace of 8,800 individuals. However, the incorporation of Topsham mandated a reevaluation of groundwater supply locations. With a thriving industry and an influx of new residents, the demand for an expanded water supply became imperative.

In 1912, the Jordan Avenue pumping station was built in 1905. As consumption rates continued to rise, the District built three high-capacity wells in the Jordan Avenue well field in 1929 since the current wellfields were no longer sufficient.

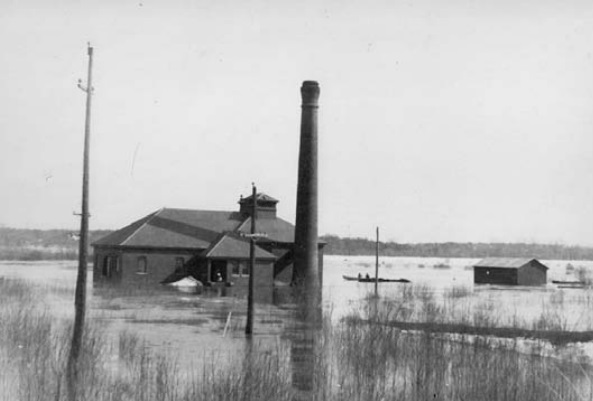
Jordan Avenue Pumping Station during the 1936 Northeastern United States flood

In the 1930s, the population was on the rise and had reached approximately 11,500 people. The need for an adequate water supply had become a concern, especially when a severe flood hit Brunswick and Topsham in 1936, which inundated the pumping station with 15 feet (4.6 m) of water. To prevent damage from future floods, the pumping station needed to be flood-proofed, which was deemed too expensive. As a result, the District decided to look for a new groundwater source and storage facility to accommodate both the current and future supply demands. In 1939, a new steel standpipe was installed off River Road in Brunswick to replace the Marrison Farm Hill Tank built in 1886 and provide additional storage capacity.

During the 1970s and 1980s, there were notable changes in the water district. Specifically, in 1971, the Jackson Station was built on River Road in Topsham. This station included a treatment plant and offices, which allowed the district to relocate its main office from 11 Town Hall Place in Brunswick. Additionally, a new well and pump station were constructed at the new location, enhancing the district's capacity to provide consistent water service in the event of a pump station failure. Over the past two decades, the system has grown rapidly and in 1988, a new storage tank was built on Church Road in Brunswick with a storage capacity of 3.0 million gallons to meet the demand for increased storage.

=== 21st century ===
The District started collecting field data for new main installs and replacements by utilizing barcodes on pipes, hydrants, and valves. Additionally, the District has adopted the latest water metering technologies.

2015 Data
Treatment process	Aeration; Ion exchange
Pipe length	121.1 miles (194.9 km)
Daily demand	1.62 miles per US gallon (0.69 km/L)
Treatment plants	Jackson Station; Jordan Station; Taylor Station
Population Served	17,100

== Notes ==
a. "Maine Street" is the correct spelling
