= Boston Bridge Works =

Bridge building contractor out of Boston, MA

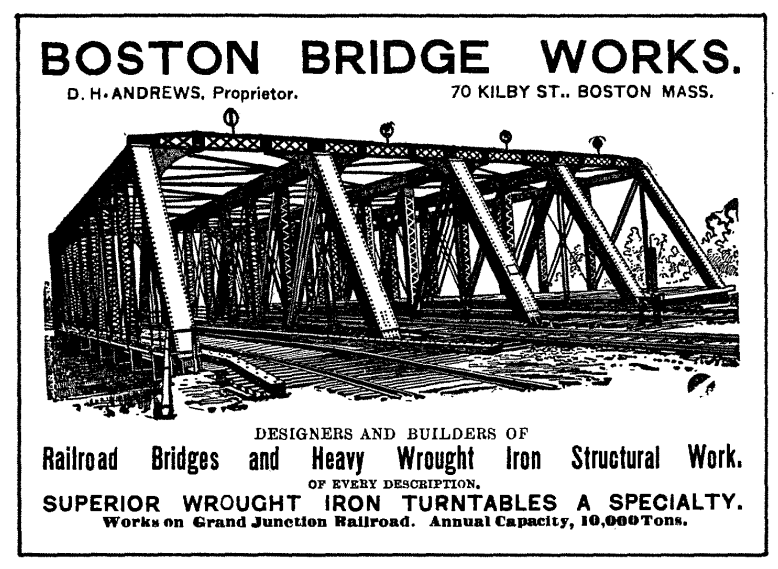
- Industry: Bridge construction
- Founded: 1876 in Boston, MA, U.S.
- Founder: D.H. Andrews
- Fate: Out of business 1938
- Area served: New England

Boston Bridge Works (also known as Boston Bridge Works, Inc.) was an engineering firm, building bridges throughout New England, during the late nineteenth and early twentieth centuries. Operating out of Boston, they specialized in the drafting, design and implementation of both road and railway truss bridges, a common bridge style of that period.

== History ==
The establishment of Boston Bridge Works was in the year 1876 by David H. Andrews, building notable bridges, such as the 1892 Harvard Bridge between Cambridge and Boston. The company also constructed bridges for many New England railways such as the Boston and Maine Railroad and Boston and Providence Railroad.

Employees of the company were engineers and contractors for steel bridges, buildings, roofs, and railway turntables. The general offices, for most of their operating years, were at 47 Winter Street, Boston, with a plant in East Cambridge.

In August 1909 a lawsuit was brought to the Massachusetts Superior Court claiming Boston Bridge Works and the New England Structural Company of wrongdoing in a civil suit. The suit alleged the two companies were in a collusive bidding war. The city of Boston claimed that the two companies had a monopoly in the area. Bids for the Broadway bridge consisted of $112,874 by the New England Structural Company and $113,000 by Boston Bridge Works. The contract was awarded to Boston Bridge Works but due to losing the lawsuit, they had to pay back $5,000 to the city of Boston.

After both a fire at their Cambridge plant, and declining contracts during the Great Depression, Boston Bridge Works went out of business in 1938.

== Notable bridges ==
Notable bridges
Image	Bridge	Year	Type	State	Town	River	Status
	Congress Street Bridge	1930	Trunnion bascule bridge	Massachusetts	Boston	Fort Point Channel	Closed, still standing
	Frank J. Wood Bridge	1932	Through truss	Maine	Brunswick; Topsham	Androscoggin River	Replaced in 2026
	Gould's Mill Bridge	1929	Baltimore truss	Vermont	Springfield	Black River	Open to traffic
	Harvard Bridge	1891	Girder bridge	Massachusetts	Boston; Cambridge	Charles River	Open to traffic
	India Point Railroad Bridge	1903	Swing bridge	Rhode Island	Providence; E. Providence	Seekonk River	Removed in 2001
	Penobscot River Bridge	1902	Truss	Maine	Bangor; Brewer	Penobscot River	Replaced in 1997
	Piermont Bridge	1928	Through truss	New Hampshire	Piermont	Connecticut River	Open to traffic
	Point Street Bridge	1927	Swing bridge	Rhode Island	Providence	Providence River	Open to traffic
	Tyngsborough Bridge	1930	Pratt-type truss	Massachusetts	Tyngsborough	Merrimack River	Open to traffic
