= Frank J. Wood Bridge =

Road bridge in Maine, US

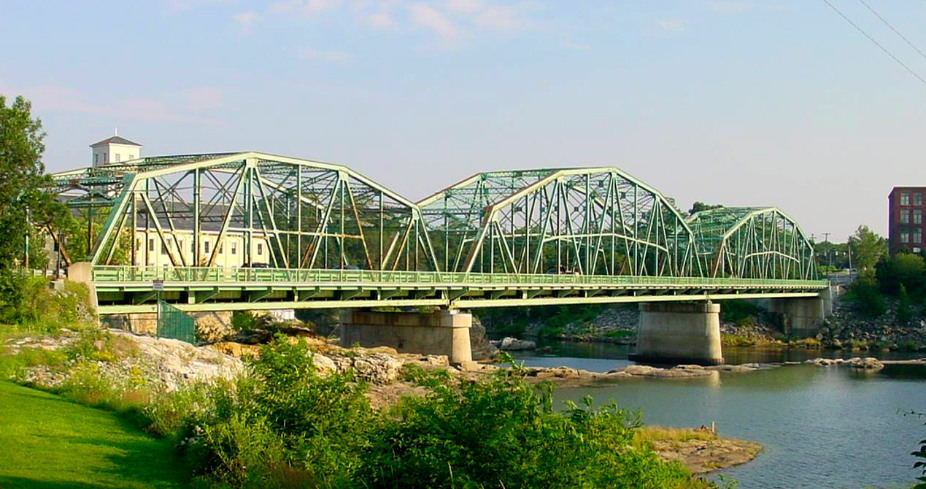
- Frank J. Wood Bridge c. 2021
- Coordinates: 43°55′16″N 69°57′57″W
- Carries: Pedestrians (1932–2026); Automobiles (1932–2026); Trucks (1932–2021); Tram (1932–1937)
- Crosses: Androscoggin River
- Locale: Topsham/Brunswick, Maine
- Other name: Green Bridge
- Named for: Frank J. Wood
- Owner: Maine
- Maintained by: Maine Department of Transportation
- Heritage status: Eligible for the National Register of Historic Places
- ID number: ME 2016
- Preceded by: Androscoggin Swinging Bridge
- Followed by: Maine State Route 196

Characteristics
- Design: Through Truss
- Material: Steel and Concrete
- Total length: 815 ft (248 m)
- Width: 30.8 ft (9.4 m)
- Longest span: 310.1 ft (94.5 m)
- No. of spans: 3
- Load limit: 10 short tons (9.1 t)
- Clearance above: 15.7 ft (4.8 m)
- Clearance below: 23 ft (7.0 m)
- No. of lanes: 2

History
- Constructed by: Boston Bridge Works
- Built: 1932
- Construction cost: 300,000 United States dollars
- Rebuilt: 1936; 1985
- Replaces: Brunswick-Topsham Bridge
- Replaced by: Pejepscot Falls Bridge

Statistics
- Daily traffic: 19,400 vehicles (2010)

Location
- Interactive map of Frank J. Wood Bridge

References
- National Bridge Inventory

The Frank J. Wood Bridge (known locally as The Green Bridge) was a three-span, through-truss bridge crossing over the Androscoggin River between the towns of Topsham and Brunswick, Maine, on U.S. Route 201 and SR 24 Business. Opened in 1932, the bridge was originally called the Brunswick-Topsham bridge (as was its predecessor) but was officially renamed the Frank J. Wood Bridge, after a local farmer who suggested the location.

The bridge met requirements to be considered for the National Register of Historic Places, both as a standalone historic site and as a component of the Brunswick Commercial Historic District. Despite its eligibility, the Maine Department of Transportation (MaineDOT) built a new bridge that replaced the Frank J. Wood Bridge in 2026.

== History ==
=== Previous bridges ===
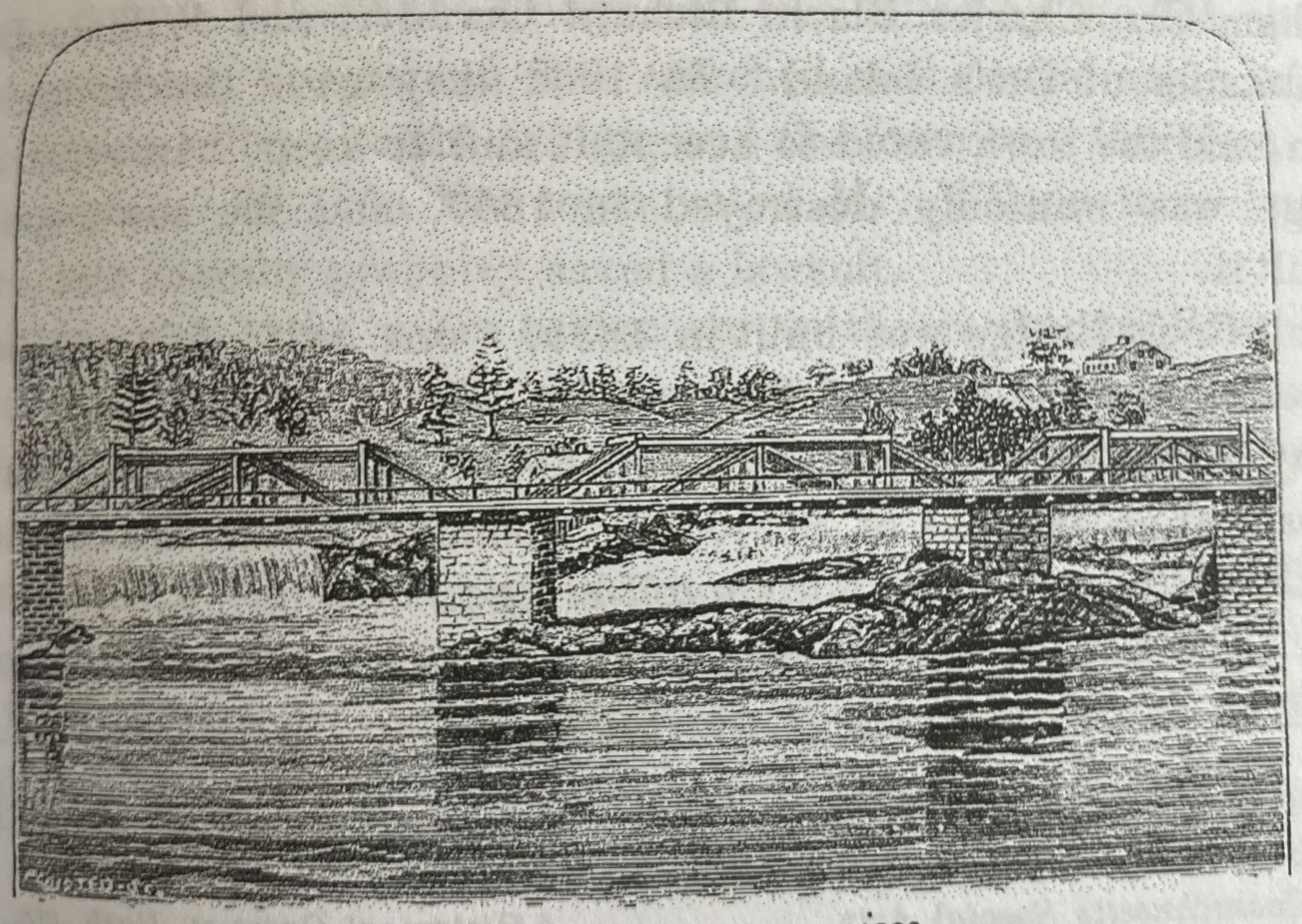
Built in 1827, this was the first bridge at this location to be supported by stone pillars.

There have been several bridges just below Brunswick Falls, on the Androscoggin River, connecting the towns of Topsham and Brunswick, Maine.

The First Bridge was built in the summer of 1796. It was built with wood and was swept away by a freshet in 1811. In 1811, there was a second wooden bridge that was built, but was also swept away by a flood in 1827. In 1827, a third bridge was built of wood but with its foundation and piers made of stone. This bridge would also have a covered version but was destroyed by a fire in 1842. In 1871, the fourth bridge was built in an open style, and was a toll bridge. Shortly after completion, it was jointly purchased and taken over by the towns of Topsham and Brunswick, made toll free, and known as the Free Bridge. The fifth bridge was built of light iron, but was swept away by yet another flood in 1896. The Topsham-Brunswick Bridge, the sixth bridge, was constructed in 1897 using stronger iron; however, it was deemed unusable in 1927 after a trolley jumped its tracks and destroyed some of its supports. The Frank J. Wood Bridge opened in 1932 and was the seventh bridge to occupy the location.

=== Namesake ===
Frank J. Wood was the proprietor of a farm in Topsham, Maine. Before the bridge was built, he petitioned the state to move the location slightly from where the older bridge was located. He was rewarded for his efforts with the name of the bridge. Wood died three years after the opening of the Frank J. Wood Bridge in 1935.

=== Design ===
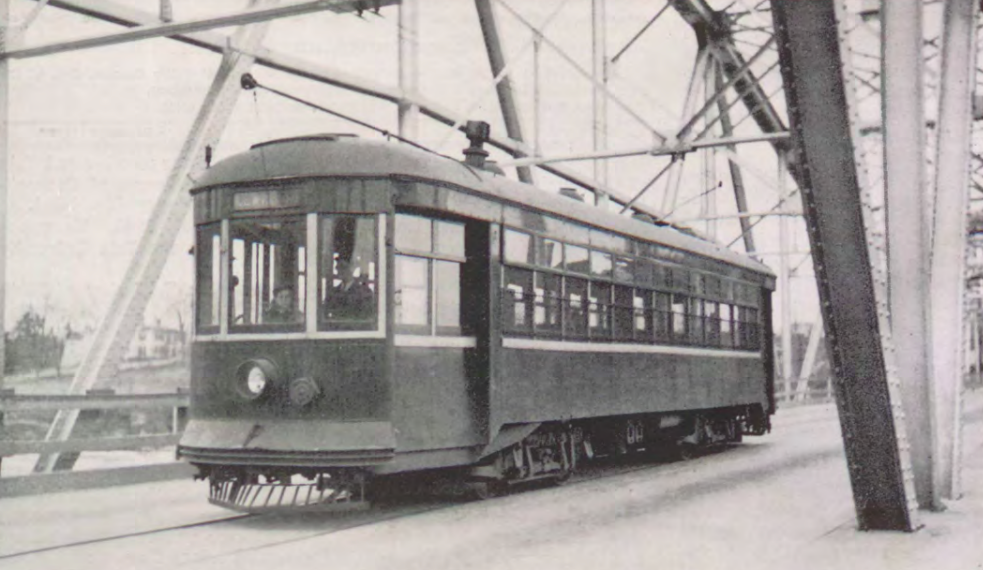
Streetcar on the Frank J. Wood Bridge

In 1931, the state of Maine commissioned Boston Bridge Works, to construct a new bridge over the Androscoggin River to replace the old Topsham-Brunswick Bridge that was deemed unsafe. The bridge was made from 1,500 short tons (1,400 t) of steel, as well as concrete, and was originally constructed with tram rails twenty feet apart.

The Frank J. Wood bridge was built to withstand any future floods that may come its way. However, the great flood of 1936, affecting all of New England, destroyed part of the bridge, but it was rebuilt and at full operating capacity by September of the same year.

In 1944, the rails from the tram line were paved over with asphalt after the Maine Central Railroad abandoned the tracks in 1937.

In 1972, steel was added to the grid deck. In 1985, repairs were made to the steel grid deck and loose bearings, and all structural steel was repainted.

=== 1985 protest ===
On December 16, 1985, Harry C. Crooker and Sons, a construction company, along with other contractors, staged a protest on the bridge, objecting to the long lines of traffic that often accumulated. At the time, the Brunswick-Topsham Bypass Advisory Committee along with legislators from the state of Maine were attempting to get a bill passed that would ensure a U.S. Route 1 bypass, easing congestion on the bridge. The protest consisted of one hundred and thirty dump trucks and flatbeds crossing over the bridge in a line that went on for 4 miles (6.4 km). The U.S. Route 1 bypass was approved for construction and opened to the public on November 11, 1997.

=== 2019–2024 lawsuits ===
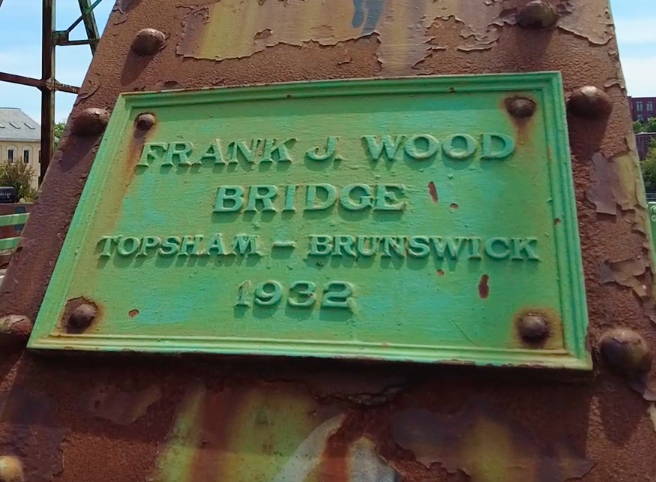
Commemorative plaque on the Frank J. Wood Bridge c. 2021.

On September 6, 2019, a lawsuit was submitted to the United States District Court for the District of Maine by the Friends of the Frank J. Wood Bridge, the National Trust for Historic Preservation, and the Historic Bridge Foundation. The plaintiffs of the suit asked the court for an injunction to halt the construction of a new bridge until the state complies with the National Environmental Policy Act of 1970. Plaintiffs claimed the removal of the bridge would violate the policy act due to the impact on the fish ladder at the Brunswick hydroelectric plant adjacent to the bridge. Plaintiffs also claimed in their suit that rehabilitation would be more cost effective than construction of a new bridge, arguing that the state was inaccurate in their cost assessment.

On February 3, 2021, federal judge Lance E. Walker ruled in favor of MaineDOT in regards to replacing the bridge, with an exception to the ruling for the state to reassess their cost estimate for rehabilitation. On March 8, 2021 the three organizations from the 2019 lawsuit filed an appeal to the initial ruling, citing the bridge's eligibility to the National Register of Historic Places. The appeal was denied on January 5, 2022 by the United States Court of Appeals for the First Circuit, citing the state was still responsible for a new assessment for rehabilitating the bridge.

On June 16, 2022, the U.S. district court ordered the state of Maine to pay 84,000 United States dollars in legal fees due to the state not assessing the cost of rehabilitation in the correct manner. In January 2023, the state again concluded that it would be less expensive to build a new bridge and started the process for construction companies to bid for the job.

A second lawsuit was filed by Friends of the Frank J. Wood Bridge, the National Trust for Historic Preservation, the Historic Bridge Foundation and Waterfront Maine on February 24, 2023. In this lawsuit, the plaintiffs accused the state of Maine of violating the Department of Transportation Act and the National Environmental Policy Act’s protections on historic sites. As part of the lawsuit, an injunction was filed to try and stop the construction of a new bridge. Judge Lance Walker denied the motion at the end of July 2023. In January 2024, Judge Lance Walker once again ruled in favor of the state, allowing the construction of the replacement to continue.

== Eligibility for historic status ==
After an initial review of the bridge, in 2016, from MaineDOT and the Federal Highway Administration, stated the bridge would not be eligible for the National Register of Historic Places. in 2017, they reevaluated and determined that the Frank J. Wood Bridge was eligible both as an individual historic place and as part of the Brunswick Commercial Historic District. Eligibility is determined by how important it is to local transportation, specifically because it's connected to regional interurban trolley lines. The Federal Highway Administration stated "While most of the features associated with the interurban line are no longer withstanding, the standard width and height of the bridge, set specifically to accommodate the interurban line, was adequate integrity to convey that significance."

== Replacement ==
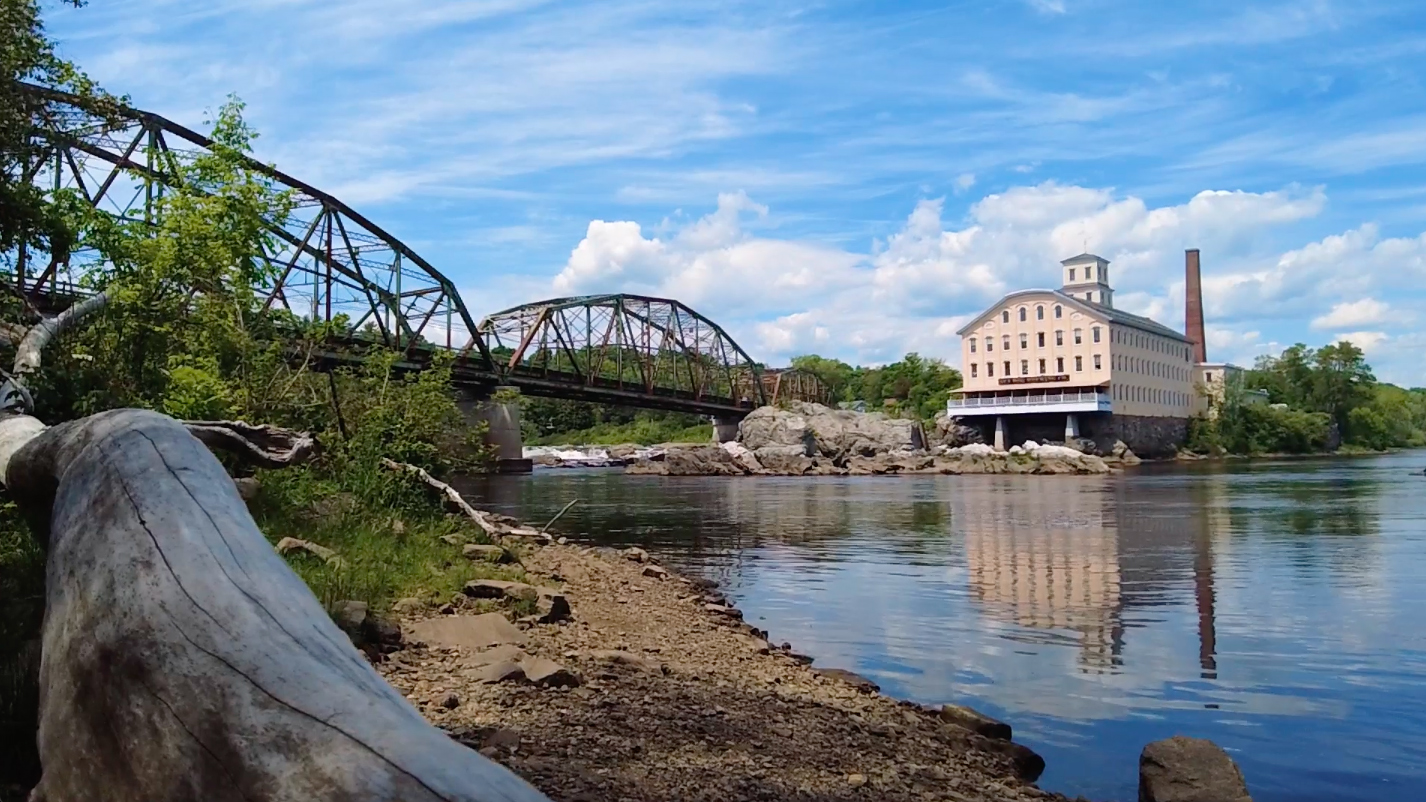
The Frank J. Wood Bridge from the viewpoint of Brunswick with the Pejepscot Paper Company mill building in the background, c. 2021.

In 2015, an inspection of the bridge revealed that both the deck and superstructure had deteriorated, resulting in a reduction of the structural load to 25 short tons (23 t). Another inspection in 2021 revealed that the bridge was deteriorating faster than expected, leading to a further reduction of the structural load to 10 short tons (9.1 t) by MaineDOT.

Even though the Frank J. Wood Bridge was eligible for the National Register of Historic Places, MaineDOT has determined it needs replacement. Preliminary designs for a new bridge would be slightly upstream of the Frank J. Wood bridge, closer to the dam at Pejepscot Falls, have bicycle lanes, pedestrian sidewalks, a viewing area, and public parks on both sides.

In 2023, MaineDOT moved forward to replace the Frank J. Wood Bridge with a cost estimate of $49,900,000, awarding a contract for the new bridge construction to Reed & Reed. The new bridge is a structure made of steel plate girders and concrete, consisting of four spans.

The name of the replacement bridge is Pejepscot Falls Bridge.

== Homage ==
Brunswick Public Art (BPA), an arts nonprofit organization, is planning to install a permanent sculpture near the entrance of the new bridge, using steel salvaged from the Frank J. Wood Bridge. Reed & Reed, the project's general contractor, has agreed to provide steel from the old bridge for the artwork. BPA will select approximately three finalists to receive compensation for developing their proposals further. With guidance from art curators, BPA aims to choose a final design and location by the end of 2025, with installation projected around 2027. Estimated to cost about $100,000, the project will begin fundraising once a final concept is selected. According to BPA treasurer and District 7 (Maine) town councilor Steve Weems, the initiative is intended to preserve a piece of local history as the iconic bridge is removed.
