= Gould's Mill Bridge =

- U.S. National Register of Historic Places
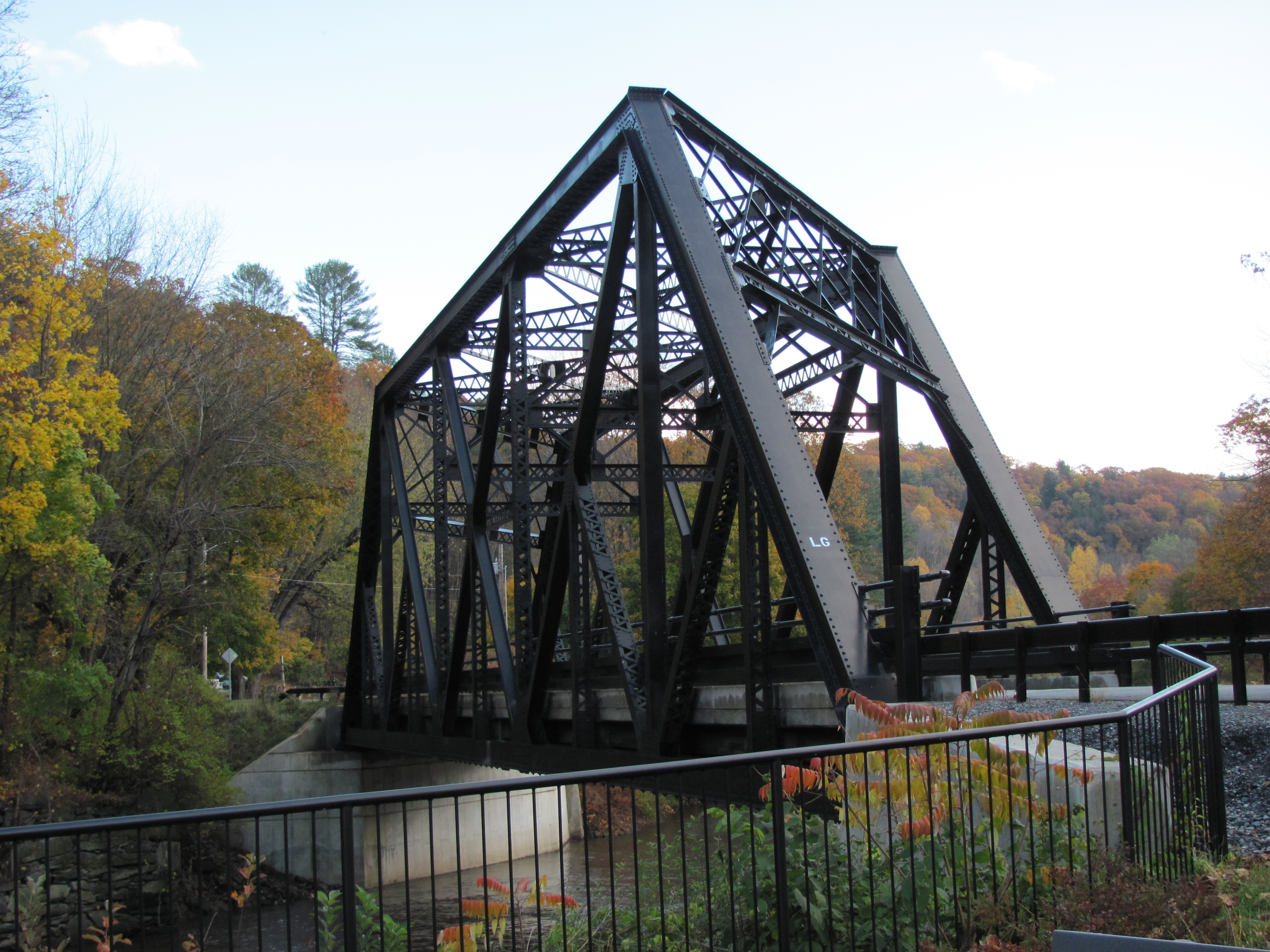
- view of the west side

- Location within Vermont
- Location: Town Hwy. 66 (Paddock Rd.) over the Black River, Springfield, Vermont
- Coordinates: 43°16′22″N 72°27′16″W
- Area: less than one acre
- Built: 1929
- Built by: Boston Bridge Works
- Architectural style: Baltimore through truss
- MPS: Metal Truss, Masonry, and Concrete Bridges in Vermont MPS
- NRHP reference No.: 05001589
- Added to NRHP: February 1, 2006

The Gould's Mill Bridge is a historic Baltimore through truss bridge, carrying Paddock Street across the Black River in Springfield, Vermont. The bridge was built by the Boston Bridge Works Company in 1929 after major flooding in 1927, and is one of the state's few examples of a Baltimore truss. It was listed on the National Register of Historic Places in 2006.

== Description and history ==
The Gould's Mill bridge stands in the village of Goulds Mill, south of the main village center of Springfield, and a short way west of the Eureka Schoolhouse. The bridge is a single-span steel Baltimore through truss structure, resting on concrete abutments. The span is 160 feet (49 m), with a roadway width of 23 feet 1 inch (7.04 m) and a portal clearance of 18 feet 6 inches (5.64 m). The Baltimore truss is a variant of the Pratt truss in which extra vertical members are added to the lower sections of each panel. The bridge carries two lanes of traffic and the Toonerville Rail Trail, and was last rehabilitated in 2009.

The bridge was built in 1929, replacing a railroad bridge that was washed away in Vermont's devastating 1927 floods. The bridge has asymmetrical elements in its truss panels, due in part to its original use as a railroad bridge; this early use also mandated its skewed alignment across the river, to accommodate the rails of the Springfield Terminal Railway Company, whose route is now taken by the rail trail. It was also built for heavier loads than road bridges due to the weight of railroad engines and cargos. At the time of its listing on the National Register in 2006, it was one of two Baltimore trusses in use as a highway bridge in the state.

== See also ==
- National Register of Historic Places listings in Windsor County, Vermont
- List of bridges on the National Register of Historic Places in Vermont
