= Topsham Fairgrounds Grandstand =

- U.S. National Register of Historic Places
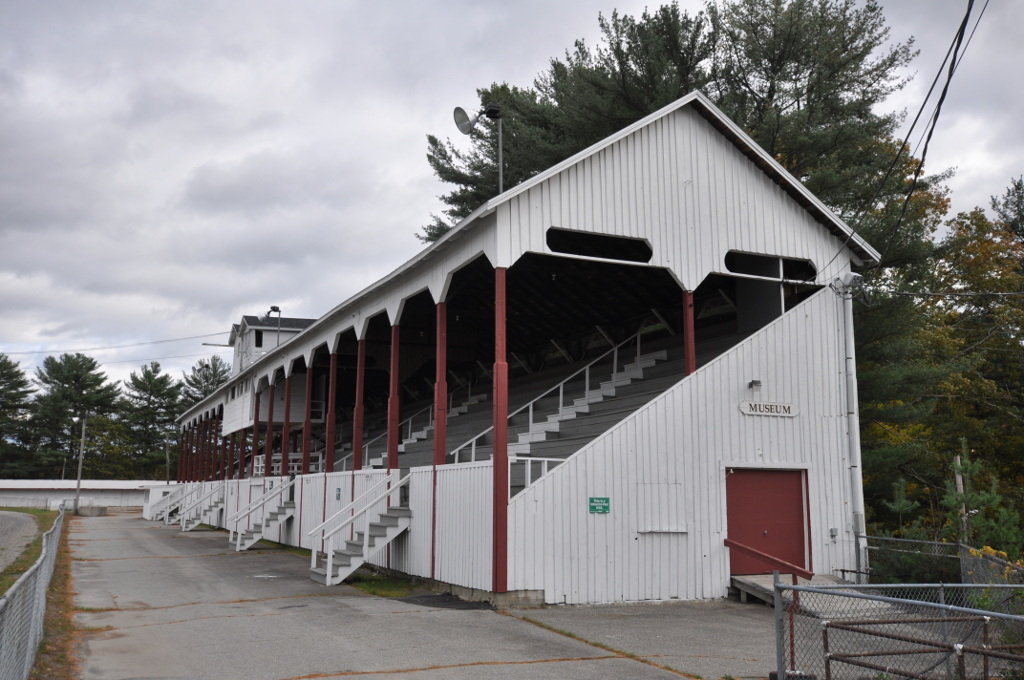

- Location within Maine Location within the United States
- Location: Off N side of Elm St., E of jct. with Fair Cir., Topsham, Maine
- Coordinates: 43°55′38″N 69°57′12″W
- Area: less than one acre
- Built: 1863
- Architectural style: Grandstand
- NRHP reference No.: 92000277
- Added to NRHP: March 26, 1992

The Topsham Fairgrounds Grandstand is a historic event venue at the Topsham Fairgrounds in Topsham, Maine. Built in the 1860s or 1870s, it is one of the state's only surviving 19th-century fairground grandstands. It was listed on the National Register of Historic Places in 1992.

== Description and history ==
The Topsham Fairgrounds Grandstand stands near the southeastern portion of the racing oval on the grounds of the Topsham Fair. It is a long, rectangular structure, with a gabled roof. The side facing the oval is open, with tiered seating divided into 18 bays by posts. The outer sides, below the seating tiers, and the rear wall are finished in vertical board-and-batten siding. An announcer's booth is suspended from the ceiling near the center of the building. Below the seating at the rear is a corridor running the length of the building.

The grandstand was built sometime between 1863 and 1877, and was likely enlarged several times. The fair was founded in 1855 by the Sagadahoc Agricultural and Horticultural Society, and was held on these grounds. Its racing oval was reconfigured sometime between 1863, when the need for its improvement was expressed in society documents, and 1877, when a depiction of the grounds shows a new oval and an apparently roofless grandstand. By 1914, a postcard shows the grandstand in its present configuration. Maine's only other 19th-century fairground grandstands, in Fryeburg and Oxford, date to the 1880s.

== See also ==
- National Register of Historic Places listings in Sagadahoc County, Maine
