= Pejepscot Paper Company =

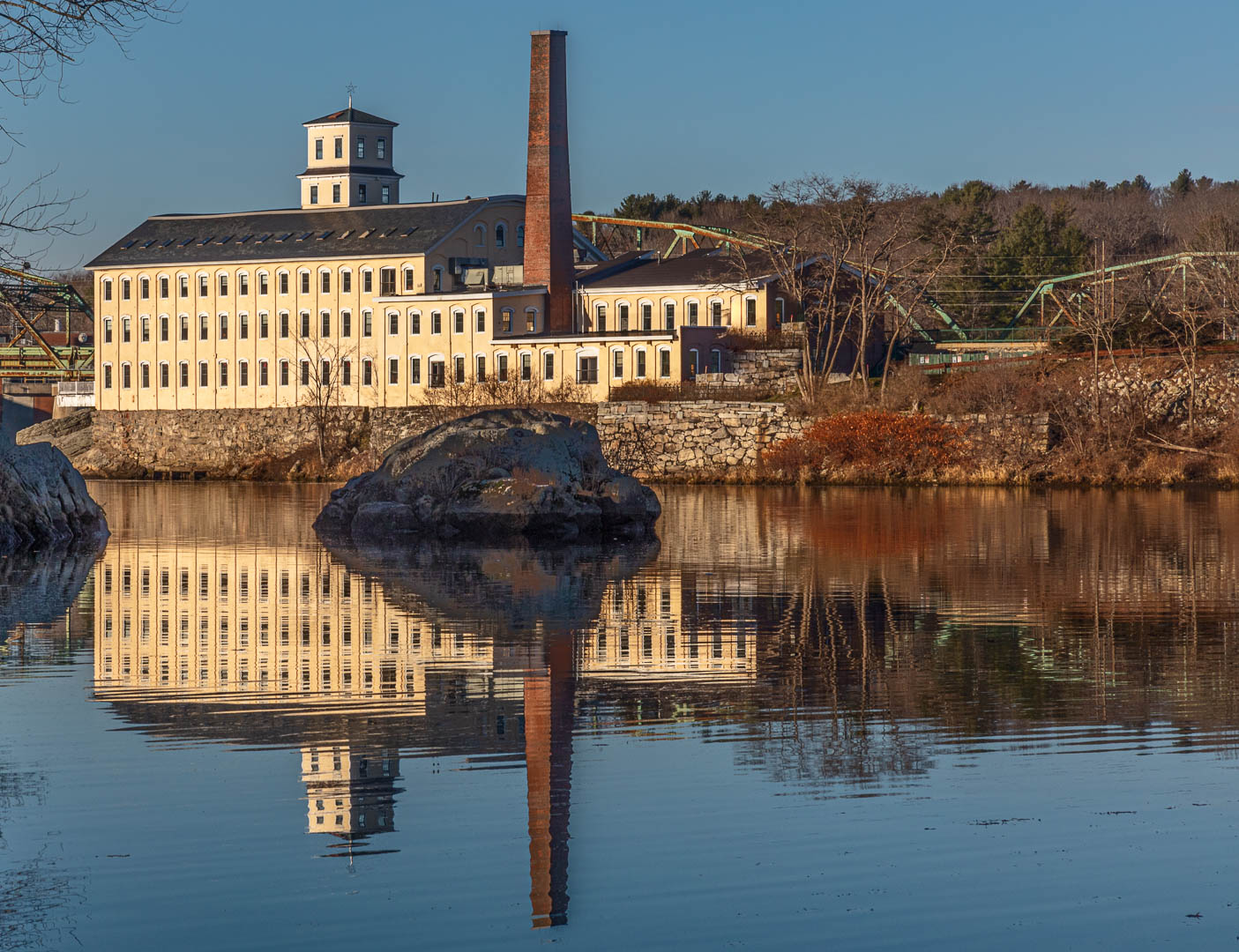
- View from Brunswick ca. 2021

Pulp
- Alternative names: Topham Paper-Mill; Bowdoin Mill

Paper machine
- Current status: Standing, usage changed
- Architectural style: Italianate
- Structural system: Granite, Brick & wood
- Location: 1 Bowdoin Mill Island, Topsham, Maine
- Current tenants: Sea Dog Brewing Company
- Coordinates: 43°55′18″N 69°57′53″W

Construction
- Built: 1868
- Employees: 75 (1878); 13 (1985)
- Other dimensions: 225 feet (69 m) Long; 65 feet (20 m) Wide
- Floor count: 3
- Cost: US$80,000 (1874)

Equipment
- Pejepscot Paper Company
- U.S. National Register of Historic Places
- NRHP reference No.: 74000192
- Added to NRHP: September 17, 1974

The Pejepscot Paper Company mill building is a historic paper mill located off U.S. 201 in Topsham, Maine, on the banks of the Androscoggin River, adjacent from Brunswick Falls and the Frank J. Wood Bridge. Built in 1868, the building is one of the oldest surviving paper mills in the state of Maine. The mill was added to the National Register of Historic Places on September 17, 1974, and is now a mixed-use commercial property, housing the Sea Dog Brewing Company.

== Design ==
The Pejepscot Paper Company mill building is a historic paper mill that stands on a point projecting southward into the Androscoggin River, just east of the Frank J. Wood Bridge carrying U.S. Route 201 between Topsham and Brunswick, Maine. It is a large three storey brick building, with a gambrel roof and a granite foundation. The short end facing the river is eight bays wide, each bay consisting of a recessed panel housing windows set in segmental arch openings and topped by decorative arches. Near the center of the building, a five-story square tower rises to a shallow-pitch pyramidal roof. The building is 250 feet (76 m) long, and 65 feet (20 m) wide.

== History ==
From 1868 to 1985, three different mills have operated in the Pejepscot Paper Company mill building. Currently it is used as office and retail space.

Paper Mill Building Owners
Name	Start Date	End Date	Years Active
Topsham Paper Company	1868	1874	6
H.&A.W. Parsons	1874	1875	1
Bowdoin Paper Manufacturing Company	1875	1887	12
Pejepscot Paper Company	1887	1985	93
Fore River Company	1998	Present	

The mill was built in the year 1868 and is an instance of Maine's 19th century wood pulp mills. It was under the management of Sanford A. Perkins for the Topsham Paper Company, and Samuel R. Jackson was the president of the corporation.

The Topsham Paper Company utilized grinders from the machine shop of the Bath Iron Works and grew rapidly from when they started out in the basement of a sawmill run by Charles D. Brown and E. B. Denisom. The success of this early venture caused Brown and Denison to branch out with other mills. Overexpansion and trouble with investors culminated in the company going out of business.

The Topsham Paper Company was purchased at auction by W.H.&A.W. Parsons on September 16, 1874, for US$80,000. The following year, February 19, 1875, W.H.&A.W. Parsons was incorporated into the Bowdoin Paper Manufacturing Company, with a capital not to exceed US$150,000. The mill contained, at that time, one Fourdrinier machine, four roll engines, one patent Jordan engine, one rotary, and two tub bleachers.

In 1887 the Pejepscot Paper Company bought the mill and doubled the equipment. The mill then contained two Fourdrinier machines, nine roll engines, two patent engines, two rotary and two tub bleachers. By 1878 the company was producing 5 short tons (4.5 t) of paper daily. The company fitted a machine shop, with wood and iron working machinery necessary for the mill repairs, and for the manufacture of any new machinery needed in the business. They employed forty-five males and thirty females, manufacturing book and wood newspaper.

By 1985, when the company closed its doors, they had only 13 employees. By this time the building was used as a paper finishing facility where paper rolls were converted into sheets for construction paper, art paper and paper for business forms.

From 1985 to 1986 the Hearst Company used the mill to store paper, but from 1986 until 1998 the building was vacant. In 1998 the Fore River Company out of Portland, Maine bought the building, renovated it for office space, and leased the old mill to the Sea Dog Brewing Company, who in turn, added a patio overlooking the Androscoggin River.

On September 17, 1974, the Pejepscot Paper Company was listed in the National Register of Historic Places.

== See also ==
- National Register of Historic Places listings in Sagadahoc County, Maine
