= Androscoggin Swinging Bridge =

Historic Suspension footbridge on the Androscoggin River

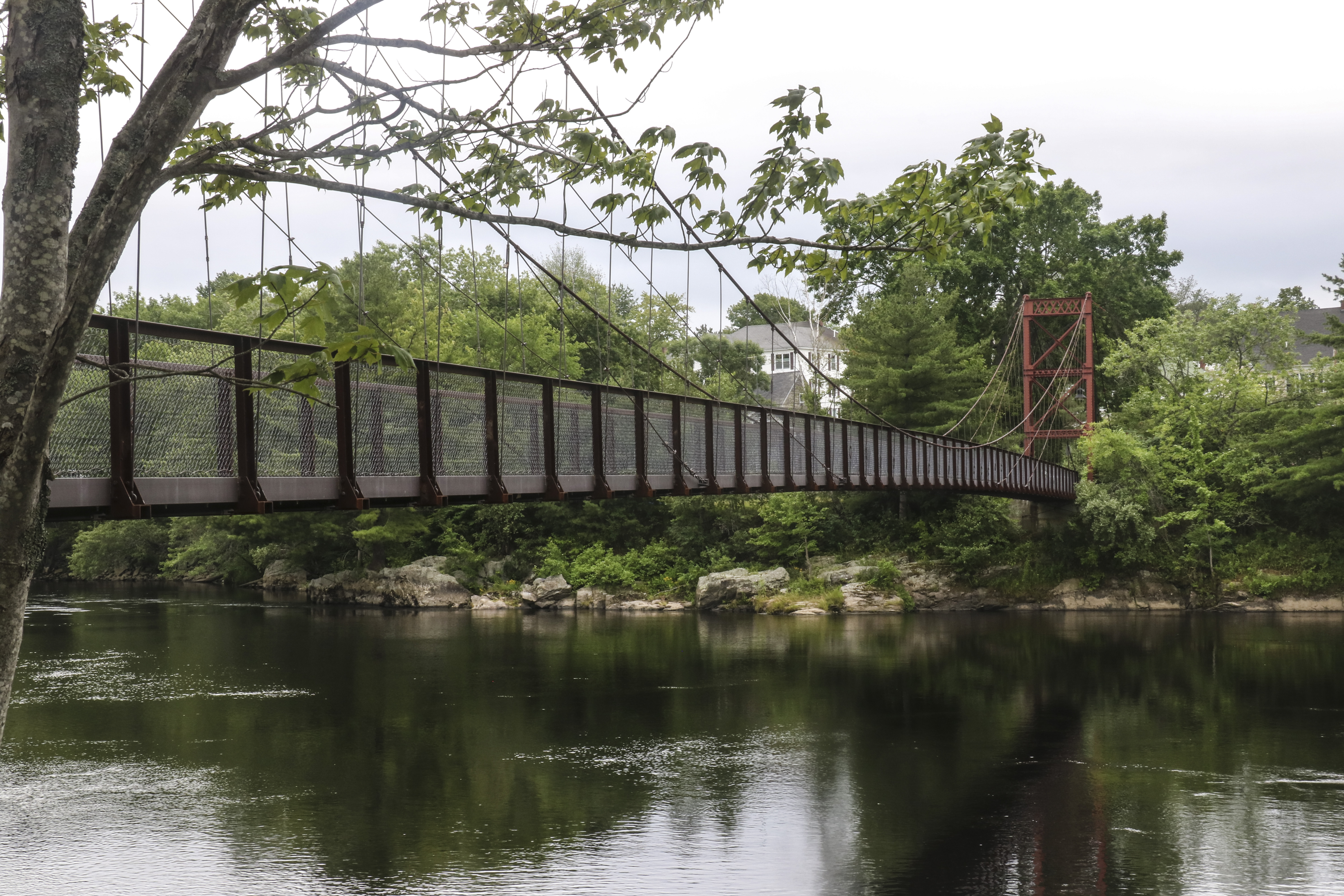
- Androscoggin Swinging Bridge c. 2017
- Coordinates: 43°55′6″N 69°58′26″W
- Carries: Pedestrians
- Crosses: Androscoggin River
- Locale: Topsham; Brunswick
- Heritage status: National Register of Historic Places
- Preceded by: "The Black Bridge"
- Followed by: Frank J. Wood Bridge

Characteristics
- Design: Suspension bridge
- Material: Wire rope, Steel, Concrete & Wood
- Width: 6 feet (1.8 m)
- Longest span: 322 feet (98 m)
- No. of spans: 1

History
- Constructed by: John A. Roebling's Sons
- Built: 1892
- Construction cost: US$2,000
- Rebuilt: 1913-1916 (Towers); 1938 (Deck and railings); 2006 (Overhaul)

Statistics
- Androscoggin Swinging Bridge
- U.S. National Register of Historic Places
- NRHP reference No.: 03001404
- Added to NRHP: January 14, 2004

Location
- Interactive map of Androscoggin Swinging Bridge

References
- National Register of Historic Places

The Androscoggin Swinging Bridge (also known simply as the Swinging Bridge) is a pedestrian suspension bridge spanning the Androscoggin River in Maine between the towns of Topsham in Sagadahoc County and Brunswick in Cumberland County. The bridge was built in 1892 as a timesaving approach for employees of the Cabot Manufacturing Company of Brunswick, providing them safer and easier passage across the river.

== Design ==
Built in 1892, the Androscoggin Swinging Bridge has two steel A-frame towers, each 30 feet 6 inches (9.30 m) in height, mounted on concrete abutments. Wire ropes are suspended from the tower, supporting a wooden plank deck suspended from the cables by metal rods, and railings 3 feet 6 inches (1.07 m) high. The span across the river between the towers is 332 feet (101 m), and the distance between the cable anchor points is 520 feet (160 m). The cable is 1.875 inches (4.76 cm) in diameter, with seven wires each composed of seven strands.

== History ==
=== 19th century ===
The Androscoggin Swinging Bridge was built in 1892 to accommodate cotton mill employees living at Topsham Heights in Topsham, Maine, a new housing development built in the late 19th century. Topsham Heights was a neighborhood that was inhabited by a large Franco-American population recruited from Canada to work in the mills. The bridge helped thousands of people walk to and from the Cabot Manufacturing Company cotton mill building located on the other side of the river in Brunswick.

In 1891 the Topsham Land Company decided that a footbridge spanning across the Androscoggin River would be a safer, more direct route than the Free Bridge (as it was called then), as it was not conducive to pedestrian traffic. The company hired John A. Roebling's Sons Company, the engineering firm that designed the Brooklyn Bridge in New York City, as well as many other bridges around the world. Construction began on the bridge May 19, 1892, and was completed in September of that year, at a cost of US$2,000. In 1906, both towns of Brunswick and Topsham became responsible for the repairs of the bridge.

=== 20th century ===
Between 1913 and 1916, the bridge's timber-framed towers were replaced with steel by Meguire & Jones, a steel metal fabrication company in South Portland.

At 5:00am on March 20, 1936, a freshet destroyed the superstructure of the bridge. Ice and logs from the Androscoggin River crashed up alongside the bridge isolating Topsham from Brunswick. Both the steel towers and suspension cables survived the flood. The federal Works Progress Administration (WPA) replaced the damaged span and filled in the towers with concrete in 1938.

=== 21st century ===
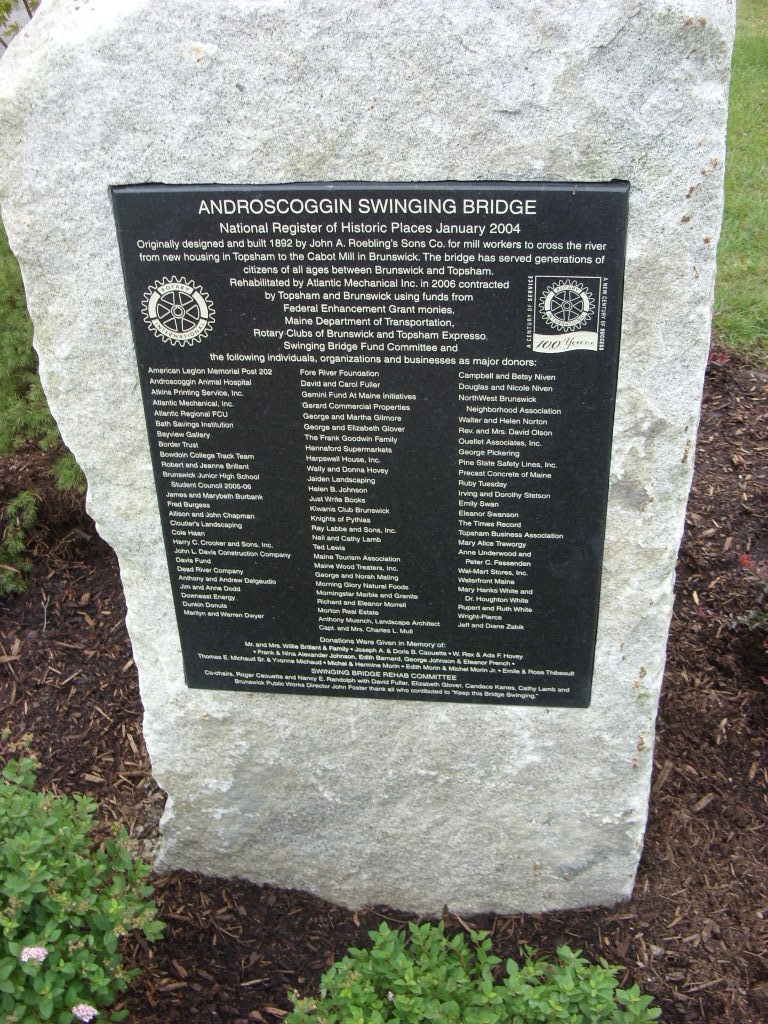
c. 2006

In 2000, a study performed by both towns found the bridge damaged in many locations including the concrete abutments, the wood planks and rust on all the metal. In 2006 Brunswick and Topsham appointed a committee of residents from both towns who secured funding from the Maine Department of Transportation as well as corporate grants to reconstruct the bridge. In 2007, public parks opened on both sides of the bridge. Two of John A. Roebling’s great-great-great granddaughters spoke at the dedication ceremony on September 8, 2007.

On January 14, 2004, the Androscoggin Swinging Bridge was listed in the National Register of Historic Places. In May 2011, the bridge was dedicated as a Maine Historic Civil Engineering Landmark by the Maine Section of the American Society of Civil Engineers. The Society paid for the installation of a commemorative plaque.

== See also ==
- National Register of Historic Places listings in Cumberland County, Maine
- National Register of Historic Places listings in Sagadahoc County, Maine
- List of bridges on the National Register of Historic Places in Maine
