= Point Street Bridge =

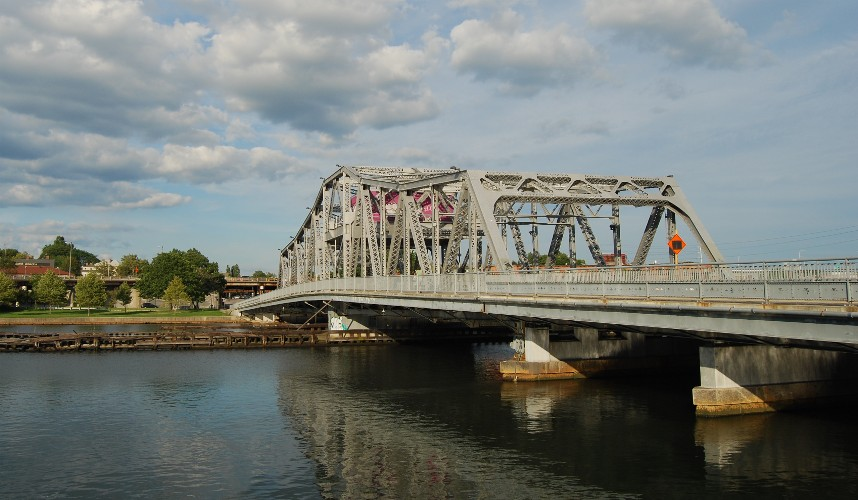
- Point Street Bridge, spanning the Providence River
- Coordinates: 41.81788°N 71.40367°W
- Carries: Two lanes of Point Street
- Crosses: Providence River
- Owner: City of Providence
- Maintained by: City of Providence
- ID number: 9800

Characteristics
- Design: Swing bridge
- Material: Steel
- Total length: 160.9 metres (528 ft)
- Width: 11.9 metres (39 ft)

History
- Constructed by: Boston Bridge Works
- Construction end: 1927 (reconstructed 1999)
- Opened: 1927
- Replaces: Swing bridge built in 1872

Statistics
- Toll: None

Location
- Interactive map of Point Street Bridge

References
- National Bridge Inventory

The Point Street Bridge is a movable bridge that crosses the Providence River in Providence, Rhode Island, carrying Point Street from the Jewelry District to Wickenden Street at the base of College Hill.

== History ==
The first bridge at this site was built in 1872. It consisted of a swing span 249 feet (76 m) in length with two 145 feet (44 m) shore spans. In 1907, each of the approach spans was divided into three plate-girder spans carried on new granite piers and abutments. However, funding was insufficient to replace the swing span, so its length was merely increased to 284 feet (87 m).

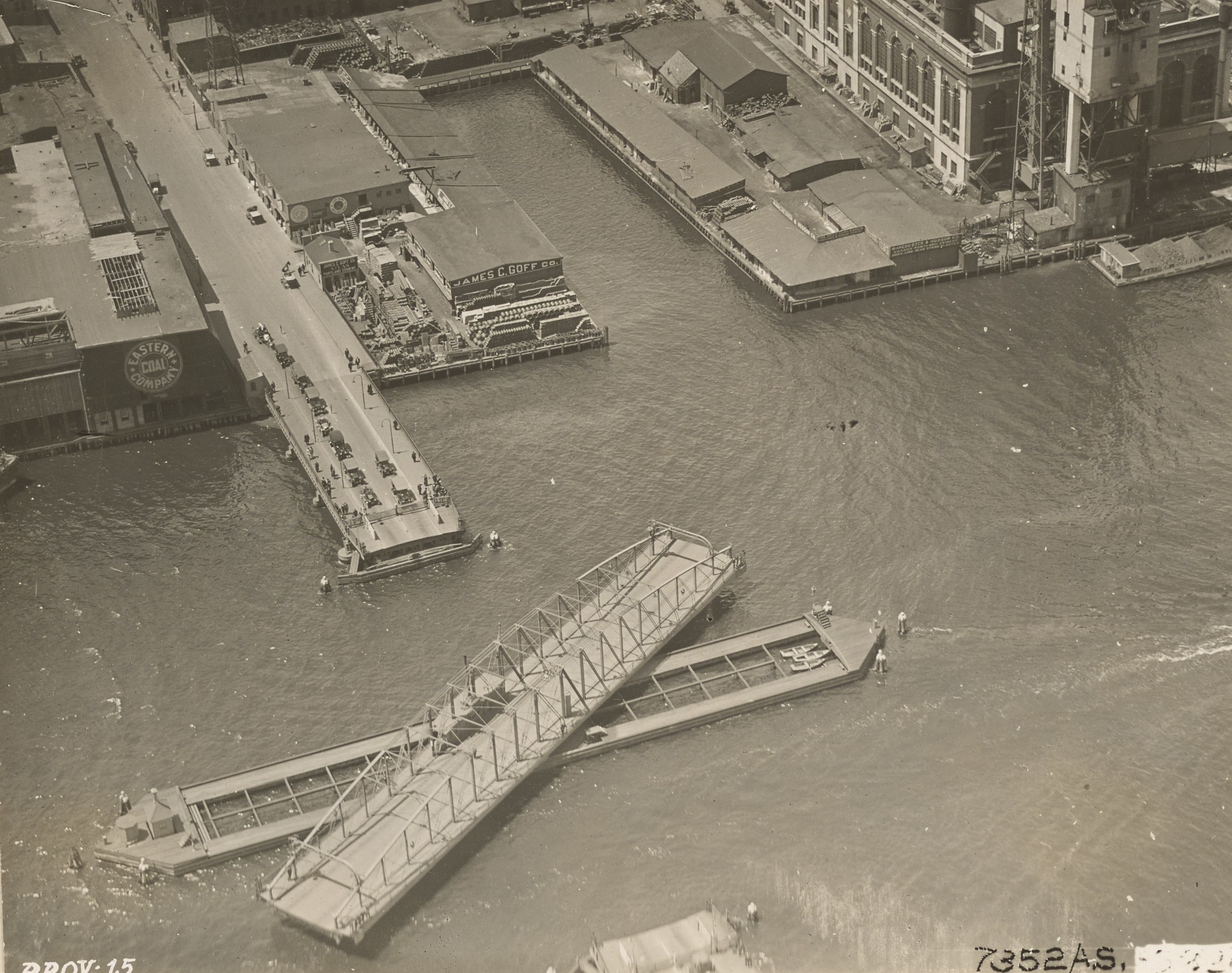
The second (1907) bridge in the open position

The current bridge is the third at this site. It is also a swing bridge and was built by the Boston Bridge Works in 1927. The bridge is no longer moveable but fixed in place to allow Point Street traffic to cross. It was last swung open in 1959. The Fox Point Hurricane Barrier, downstream of the Point Street Bridge and completed in 1966, rendered the swing feature of little value, because the Barrier blocks large vessels from traveling upstream before the bridge would.

After World War II, Route 1A became a major route carrying traffic from southern RI to the East Side of Providence, and points east. The Point Street Bridge was part of that route, and on exceptionally hot summer days, the bridge would expand after it opened, and with nowhere to bleed off the heat, it expanded to a point where it couldn't be closed. Traffic built up for several miles and fire tankers had to be summoned to shoot water on the bridge until it shrunk back to a size (only an inch or two) so it could be closed and let traffic resume.

Bicycle lane markings were added to the bridge as part of the city's 2013 Bicycle Master Plan.
