= 1936 Northeastern United States flood =

Historic flood in the Northeastern United States in 1936

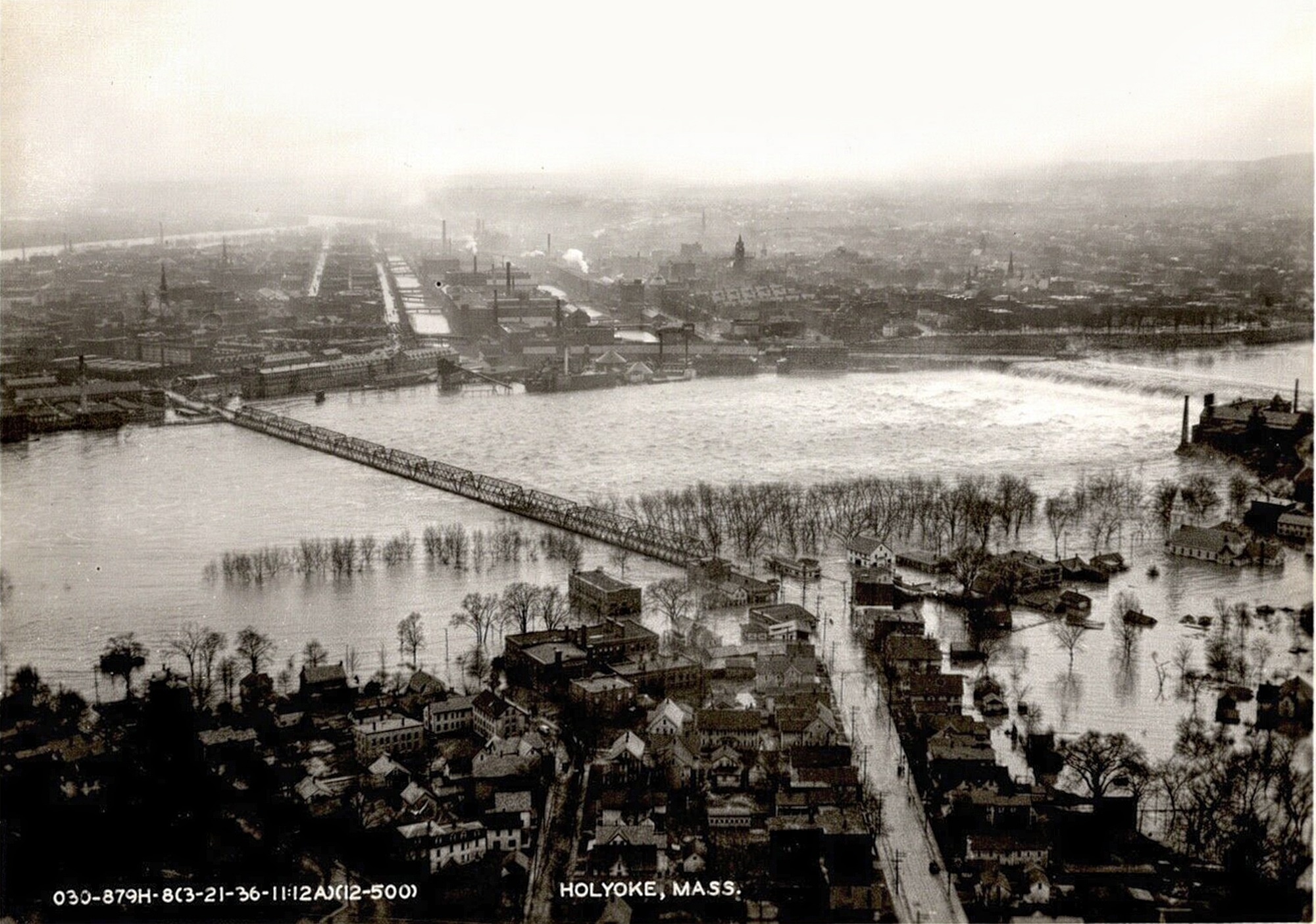
In Holyoke, Massachusetts, the Connecticut River overflowed its banks as a result of the flood.

The 1936 Northeastern United States flood was a historic flood that occurred across the Northeastern United States, as well as the Mid-Atlantic region and Ohio, in March 1936. Record-setting flooding after a combination of a particularly precipitation-heavy winter and large amounts of rainfall in March caused severe damage across the region.

Record heights were recorded in many rivers, including the Connecticut River, which peaked at 37.6 feet (11.5 m) in Hartford, the Merrimack River, the Pemigewasset River, and the Androscoggin River.

The flood led to an estimated 150 to 200 deaths across the Northeast, and hundreds of millions of dollars in damage in 1936 dollars. $100 million in 1936 dollars is equivalent in purchasing power to about $2.2 billion in 2023.

== Background ==
The winter of 1935–36 was particularly cold, and more snowfall than usual fell in the Northeast. When March arrived, along with warmer temperatures, this snow began to melt, causing water levels in rivers to rise. This was aggravated by several precipitation-heavy storm systems, which hit the region back to back in early to mid March. The first of these storm systems hit the region starting on March 9, associated with a warm front which stalled over the area. Significant amounts of rain fell, with amounts as high as 5 inches (130 mm) reported in Northern New England. A second storm system arrived around March 18, which produced even more rain than the previous one. Pinkham Notch in New Hampshire recorded 10 inches (250 mm) of rain between March 18 and 19.

In its report on the flooding, the United States Geological Survey described March 1936 in no uncertain terms: "The depths of rainfall mark this period as one of the greatest concentrations of precipitation, in respect to time and magnitude of the area covered, of which there is record in this country."

== First flood ==
Starting on March 12, flooding was observed across the Northeast, from Maine to Pennsylvania. Significant damage was caused by ice jams on numerous rivers, including the Hudson River. Twenty people were confirmed dead from flooding on March 13. The flooding was somewhat arrested by a freeze starting on March 13.

=== Massachusetts ===
The Holyoke Dam had a 5,000-square-foot (460 m^{2}) section ripped out by an ice jam.

=== Connecticut ===
In what was hailed as the "worst Connecticut floods in years", major damage occurred to transportation links, industries, and homes alike. The New Haven Railroad and Central Vermont Railway both reported numerous washouts along their tracks, while houses were carried away along the flooded Housatonic River in the western part of the state. Across the state, evacuations were ordered in low-lying areas near rivers, with some families being rescued from their homes by rowboats.

== Second flood ==
The stages and discharges of these great floods were notable, not only because they equaled or exceeded those of all previously recorded floods in many of the river basins but also because the floods occurred simultaneously over an extent of area that was unprecedented in the records or traditions of floods of the region, covering many years and even centuries.

— The USGS report on the 1936 flood.

In the immediate aftermath of the March 18 storm, catastrophic flooding began. In addition to every state in the Northeast, flooding also occurred in Virginia, Maryland, Delaware, Washington, D.C., West Virginia, and Ohio. Many of the rivers were filled with ice, which served to further increase the damage. Across New England, and especially in the northernmost states, ice jams and floating ice destroyed numerous bridges and caused damage to buildings. By the afternoon of March 19, more than 200,000 people were homeless as a result of the flood, a number which increased to 260,000 on March 21.

=== Maine ===
The Kennebec River was the scene of major flooding, resulting in multiple bridges being destroyed by floating ice. Damage along the Kennebec and Androscoggin Rivers was increased by ice jams. Similarly, six bridges along the Saco River were destroyed by the advancing ice.

In total, the Maine State Highway Commission reported 81 highway bridges were destroyed or damaged seriously enough to require rebuilding.

=== New Hampshire ===
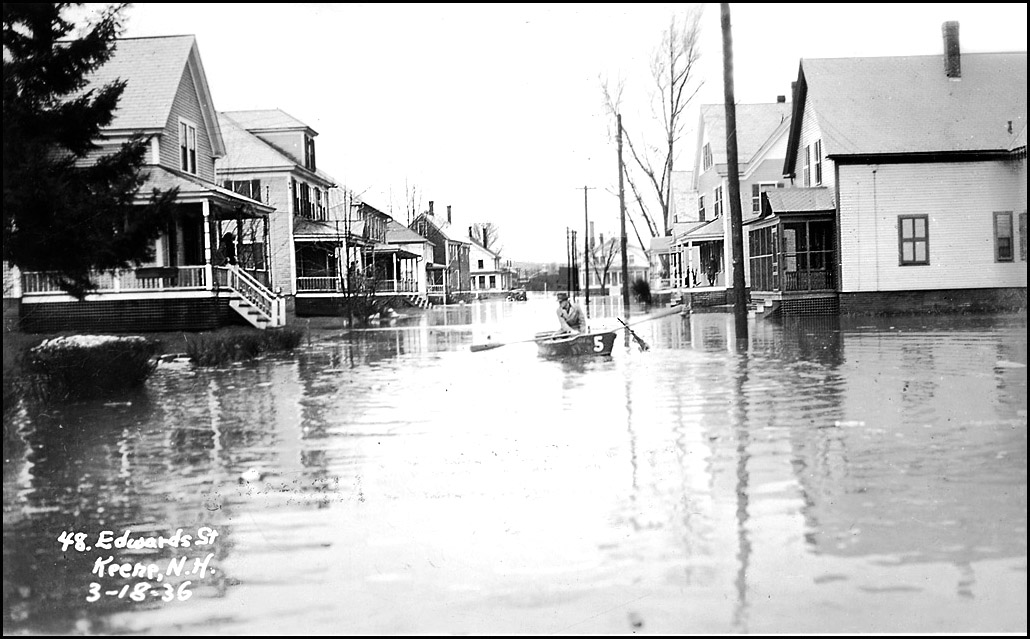
Flooding in Keene, New Hampshire.

The Merrimack Valley experienced some of the worst flooding in all of New England. Hooksett, New Hampshire, was submerged by water as deep as 20 feet (6.1 m). The dam of the Amoskeag Manufacturing Company in Manchester was saved only by the use of more than 500,000 sandbags, though the company's facilities were severely damaged.

In total, 87 municipalities in New Hampshire reported at least some level of flood damage.

=== Massachusetts ===
In Massachusetts, the worst flooding occurred along the Connecticut River. By March 19, at least 15,000 residents in Springfield had been made homeless by the floodwaters. The National Guard was activated to assist in search and rescue, fight off looters, and help rebuild. The Guard and the Springfield Police Department patrolled the city by boat, as roads were impassible by vehicles.

The same day, a dam broke in Uxbridge, causing a 15-foot (4.6 m) high wall of water to flow down the Blackstone Valley.

The Merrimack River crested at a record 68.4 feet (20.8 m) in Lowell, while the Connecticut River reached a maximum depth of 49.2 feet (15.0 m) in Montague, records which both stand as of 2015.

=== Connecticut ===
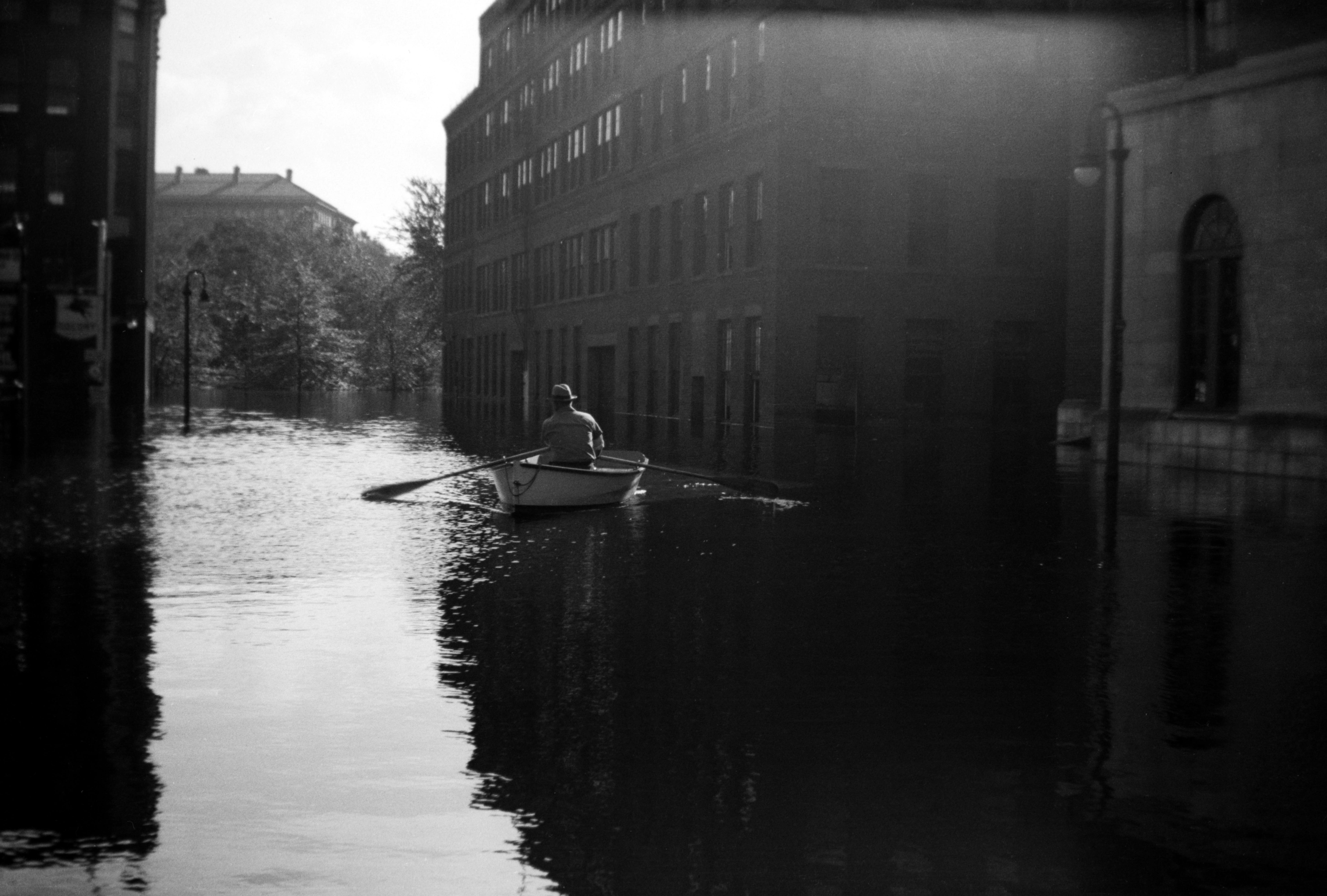
A man navigates the flooded streets of Hartford in a rowboat.

Along the Connecticut River, many communities faced the worst flooding ever recorded. In Hartford, the river crested at 37.6 feet (11.5 m), a record which still stands as of 2015. Twenty percent of downtown Hartford was navigable only by boat. The city lost nearly all power and telephone communications, while more than 300 National Guardsmen deployed in the city to patrol the flooded streets and rescue those stranded by floodwaters.

In Middletown, the entire city ground to a halt after power was knocked out by flooding. The bridge across the river to Portland was shut down, leaving the city "virtually isolated".

=== Rhode Island ===
The Blackstone River rose dangerously high in Rhode Island, with major flooding observed in Woonsocket, where some streets became navigable only by boat. In Pawtucket, water rose nearly as high as the city's bridges across the river.

=== Pennsylvania ===
Pennsylvania experienced particularly devastating floods in Pittsburgh and Johnstown. In Johnstown, site of an infamous flood in 1889, residents feared a repeat of the dam failure that caused the previous flood. Fortunately for the region, the dam survived the flooding, but this did not stop the city's rivers from overflowing their banks and covering much of Johnstown in 12–14 feet (3.7–4.3 m) of floodwaters.

Transportation in Pittsburgh ceased, as the city's railroad yards were flooded.

By March 21, over 80,000 people had been made homeless in Pennsylvania.

=== West Virginia ===
Two bridges in Harpers Ferry were destroyed by floodwaters, along with another in Shepherdstown. Lower Town Harpers Ferry was particularly devastated, and practically ceased to exist.

=== Maryland ===
Starting on March 17, Maryland was hit by severe flooding. The city of Cumberland, on the North Branch Potomac River, was particularly badly damaged, and the governor activated the Maryland National Guard to assist in relief efforts. In Cumberland alone, damage was estimated at over $50 million in today's dollars.

The Potomac River crested at 47.6 feet (14.5 m) in Hancock, breaking the previous record set in 1889 by 7.9 feet (2.4 m).

=== Virginia ===
The Potomac and James Rivers suffered severe flooding during mid-March 1936. Great Falls experienced what were, as of July 2014, its highest floods on record. Washington, D.C., saw its airport, Washington-Hoover Airport in Arlington, Virginia, flooded.

=== Washington, D.C. ===
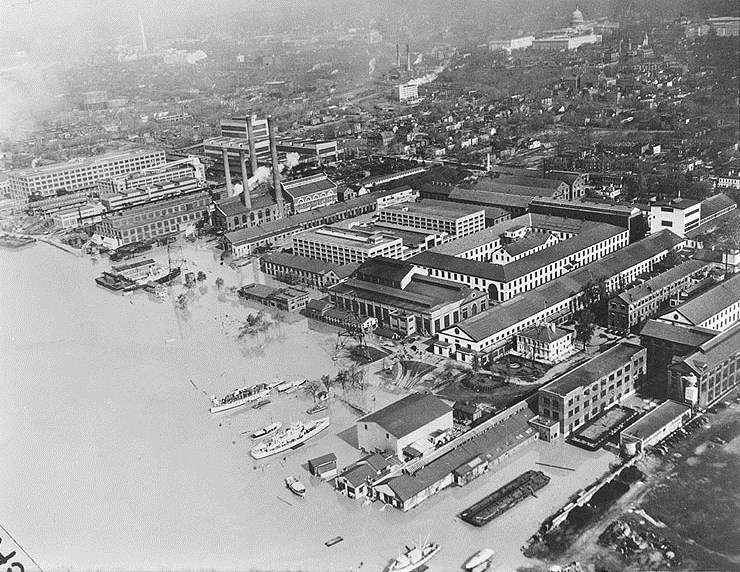
Flooding in the Washington Navy Yard.

Flooding reached the nation's capital on March 20. The Potomac River crested at 18.5 feet (5.6 m) under Key Bridge, which was the only bridge connecting the district to Virginia to remain above the waters. Large portions of the National Mall were flooded, but there was enough warning for the Capitol Park Service to protect the Washington Monument and the Lincoln Memorial by building a barrier of stone and sandbags, with the help of more than 3,000 men and multiple steam shovels. Hains Point was impossible to see due to flooding, which was as high as the tops of trees. Despite the large extent of flooding, there were no fatalities in Washington, D.C.

=== Delaware ===
Only minor flooding occurred in Delaware, mostly affecting farmland. The Indian River Inlet Bridge was slightly damaged by ice in the Delaware River. Damage was also reported to the jetties in Bethany Beach.

== Legacy ==
The massive scope of devastation led to monumental changes in the way the United States protected against flood damage. The Flood Control Act of 1936 was a direct result of the floods, and led to significant investment in flood protection, funding the construction of levees, dams, reservoirs, and other methods of mitigating or preventing floods.
