= 1908 in the United States =

- Decades: 1880s; 1890s; 1900s; 1910s; 1920s
- See also: History of the United States (1865–1918); Timeline of United States history (1900–1929); List of years in the United States

Events from the year 1908 in the United States.

== Incumbents ==
=== Federal government ===
- President: Theodore Roosevelt (R-New York)
- Vice President: Charles W. Fairbanks (R-Indiana)
- Chief Justice: Melville Fuller (Illinois)
- Speaker of the House of Representatives: Joseph Gurney Cannon (R-Illinois)
- Congress: 60th

==== State governments ====
Governors and lieutenant governors

=== Governors ===
- Governor of Alabama: B. B. Comer (Democratic)
- Governor of Arkansas: Xenophon Overton Pindall (Democratic)
- Governor of California: James Gillett (Republican)
- Governor of Colorado: Henry Augustus Buchtel (Republican)
- Governor of Connecticut: Rollin S. Woodruff (Republican)
- Governor of Delaware: Preston Lea (Republican)
- Governor of Florida: Napoleon B. Broward (Democratic)
- Governor of Georgia: Hoke Smith (Democratic)
- Governor of Idaho: Frank R. Gooding (Republican)
- Governor of Illinois: Charles S. Deneen (Republican)
- Governor of Indiana: J. Frank Hanly (Republican)
- Governor of Iowa: Albert B. Cummins (Republican) (until November 24), Warren Garst (Republican) (starting November 24)
- Governor of Kansas: Edward W. Hoch (Republican)
- Governor of Kentucky: Augustus E. Willson (Republican)
- Governor of Louisiana: Newton Crain Blanchard (Democratic) (until May 12), Jared Young Sanders Sr. (Democratic) (starting May 12)
- Governor of Maine: William T. Cobb (Republican)
- Governor of Maryland: Edwin Warfield (Democratic) (until January 8), Austin Lane Crothers (Democratic) (starting January 8)
- Governor of Massachusetts: Curtis Guild Jr. (Republican)
- Governor of Michigan: Fred M. Warner (Republican)
- Governor of Minnesota: John A. Johnson (Democratic)
- Governor of Mississippi: James K. Vardaman (Democratic) (until January 21), Edmond Noel (Democratic) (starting January 21)
- Governor of Missouri: Joseph W. Folk (Democratic)
- Governor of Montana: Joseph Toole (Democratic) (until April 1), Edwin L. Norris (Democratic) (starting April 1)
- Governor of Nebraska: George L. Sheldon (Republican)
- Governor of Nevada: John Sparks (Silver) (until May 22), Denver S. Dickerson (Silver) (starting May 22)
- Governor of New Hampshire: Charles M. Floyd (Republican)
- Governor of New Jersey: Edward C. Stokes (Republican) (until January 21), John Franklin Fort (Republican) (starting January 21)
- Governor of New York: Charles Evans Hughes (Republican)
- Governor of North Carolina: Robert Broadnax Glenn (Democratic)
- Governor of North Dakota: John Burke (Democratic)
- Governor of Ohio: Andrew L. Harris (Republican)
- Governor of Oklahoma: Charles N. Haskell (Democratic)
- Governor of Oregon: George Chamberlain (Democratic)
- Governor of Pennsylvania: Edwin Sydney Stuart (Republican)
- Governor of Rhode Island: James H. Higgins (Democratic)
- Governor of South Carolina: Martin Frederick Ansel (Democratic)
- Governor of South Dakota: Coe I. Crawford (Republican)
- Governor of Tennessee: Malcolm R. Patterson (Democratic)
- Governor of Texas: Thomas Mitchell Campbell (Democratic)
- Governor of Utah: John Christopher Cutler (Republican)
- Governor of Vermont: Fletcher D. Proctor (Republican) (until October 8), George H. Prouty (Republican) (starting October 8)
- Governor of Virginia: Claude A. Swanson (Democratic)
- Governor of Washington: Albert E. Mead (Republican)
- Governor of West Virginia: William M. O. Dawson (Republican)
- Governor of Wisconsin: James O. Davidson (Republican)
- Governor of Wyoming: Bryant B. Brooks (Republican)

=== Lieutenant governors ===
- Lieutenant Governor of Alabama: Henry B. Gray (Democratic)
- Lieutenant Governor of California: Warren R. Porter (Republican)
- Lieutenant Governor of Colorado: Erastus Harper (Republican)
- Lieutenant Governor of Connecticut: Everett J. Lake (Republican)
- Lieutenant Governor of Delaware: Isaac T. Parker (Republican)
- Lieutenant Governor of Idaho: Ezra A. Burrell (Republican)
- Lieutenant Governor of Illinois: Lawrence Sherman (Republican)
- Lieutenant Governor of Indiana: Hugh T. Miller (Republican)
- Lieutenant Governor of Iowa: Warren Garst (Republican) (until November 24), vacant (starting November 24)
- Lieutenant Governor of Kansas: William J. Fitzgerald (Republican)
- Lieutenant Governor of Kentucky: William Hopkinson Cox (Republican)
- Lieutenant Governor of Louisiana: Jared Y. Sanders, Sr. (Democratic) (until May 12), Paul M. Lambremont (Democratic) (starting May 12)
- Lieutenant Governor of Massachusetts: Eben Sumner Draper (Republican)
- Lieutenant Governor of Michigan: Patrick H. Kelley (Republican)
- Lieutenant Governor of Minnesota: Adolph Olson Eberhart (Republican)
- Lieutenant Governor of Mississippi: John Prentiss Carter (Democratic) (until month and day unknown), Luther Manship (Democratic) (starting month and day unknown)
- Lieutenant Governor of Missouri: John C. McKinley (Republican)
- Lieutenant Governor of Montana: Edwin L. Norris (Democratic) (until month and day unknown), Benjamin F. White (Republican) (starting month and day unknown)
- Lieutenant Governor of Nebraska: Melville R. Hopewell (Republican)
- Lieutenant Governor of Nevada: Denver S. Dickerson (Silver) (until May 22), vacant (starting May 22)
- Lieutenant Governor of New York: Lewis Stuyvesant Chanler (Democratic) (until end of December 31)
- Lieutenant Governor of North Carolina: Francis D. Winston (Democratic)
- Lieutenant Governor of North Dakota: Robert S. Lewis (Republican)
- Lieutenant Governor of Ohio: vacant
- Lieutenant Governor of Oklahoma: George W. Bellamy (Democratic)
- Lieutenant Governor of Pennsylvania: Robert S. Murphy (Republican)
- Lieutenant Governor of Rhode Island: Frederick Jackson (Republican) (until month and day unknown), Ralph Watrous (Republican) (starting month and day unknown)
- Lieutenant Governor of South Carolina: Thomas Gordon McLeod (Democratic)
- Lieutenant Governor of South Dakota: Howard C. Shober (Republican)
- Lieutenant Governor of Tennessee: E. G. Tollett (Democratic)
- Lieutenant Governor of Texas: Asbury Bascom Davidson (Democratic)
- Lieutenant Governor of Vermont: George H. Prouty (Republican) (until October 8), John A. Mead (Republican) (starting October 8)
- Lieutenant Governor of Virginia: James Taylor Ellyson (Democratic)
- Lieutenant Governor of Washington: Charles E. Coon (Republican)
- Lieutenant Governor of Wisconsin: William D. Connor (Republican)

== Events ==
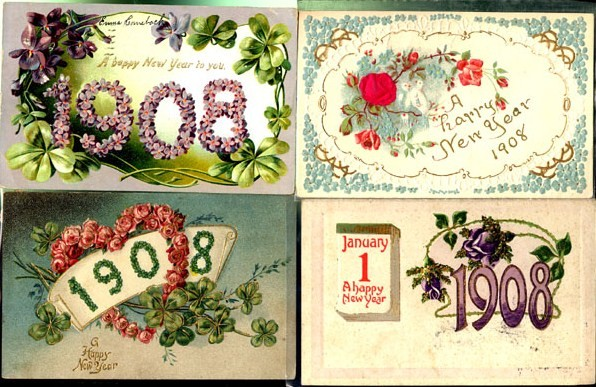
United States postcards for New Year 1908

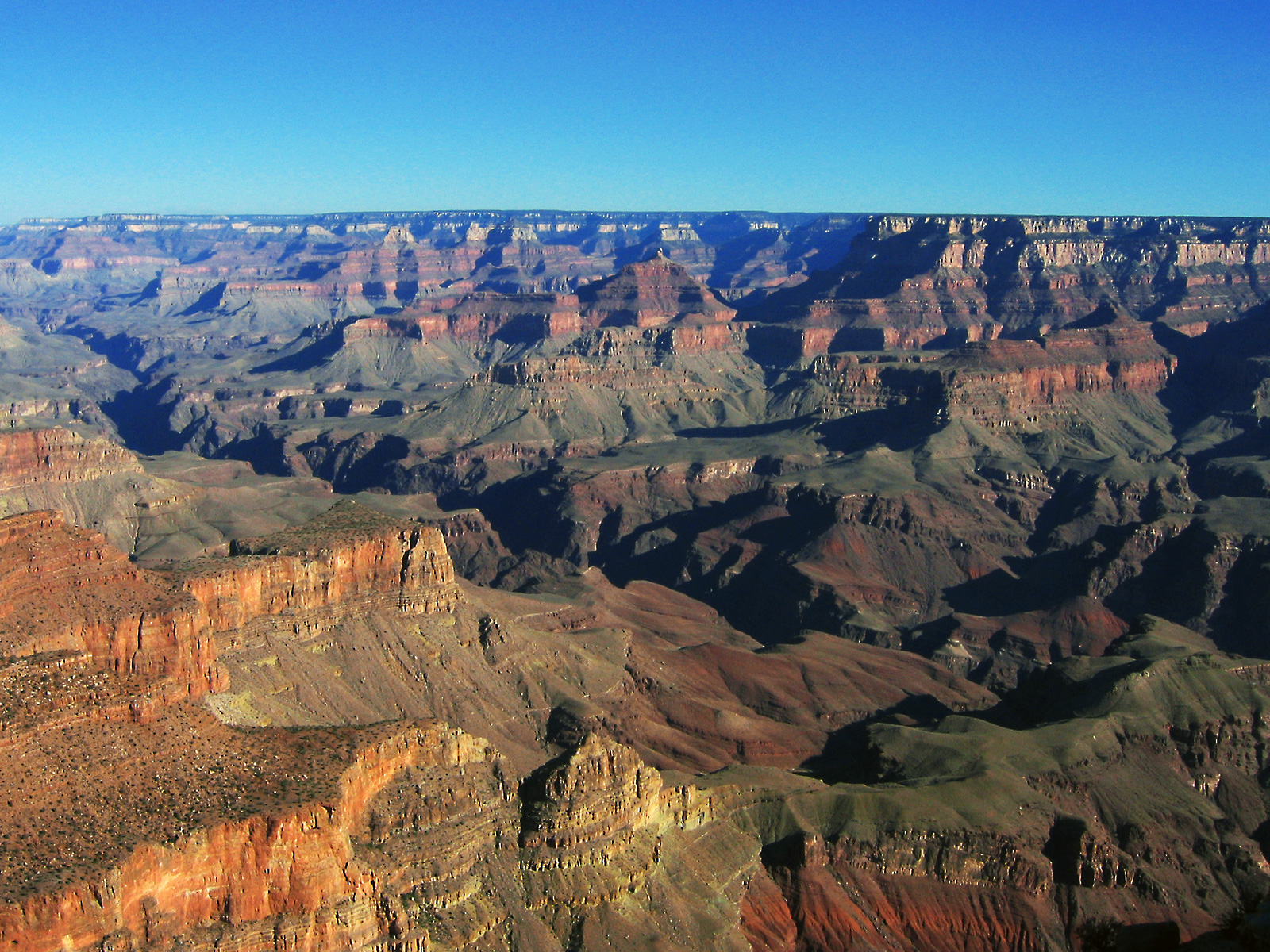
January 11: Grand Canyon designated as a monument, and later, in 1919, becomes a National Park.

=== January ===
- January 1
  - A ball signifying New Year's Day drops in New York City's Times Square for the first time.
  - Gustav Mahler makes his US conducting debut at the Metropolitan Opera.
  - Georgia introduces a law prohibiting alcohol.
- January 13 – A fire at the Rhoads Opera House in Boyertown, Pennsylvania, kills 170 people. The tragedy is a catalyst for stricter fire safety laws nationwide.
- January 15 – The Alpha Kappa Alpha sorority (the first Greek-letter organization for black college women) is established.
- January 21 – New York City passes the Sullivan Ordinance, making it illegal for people who control public places to allow women to smoke in them. It is vetoed by Mayor George B. McClellan Jr.

=== February ===
- February – The Converse Rubber Shoe Company (also known as the Boston Rubber Shoe Company) is formed in Malden, Massachusetts.
- February 12
  - The first around-the-world car race, begins in New York City.
  - Division of Militia Affairs with the War Department.
- February 18 – Japanese immigration to the United States is restricted under the Gentlemen's Agreement of 1907.
- February 25 – The Bible Institute of Los Angeles (now Biola University) is founded.
- February 27 – A forty-sixth star is added to the United States flag representing the state of Oklahoma.
- February 29 – The State Normal and Industrial School for Women, precursor to James Madison University, is founded in Harrisonburg, Virginia.

=== March ===
- March 4 – The Collinwood School Fire, near Cleveland, Ohio, kills 174 people.
- March 26 – The US Thomas Flyer car sails for Alaska at the head of a motor race from New York to Paris.

=== April ===
- April 8 – Harvard University votes to establish the Harvard Business School.
- April 14 – The first Hauser Dam in Montana fails, causing severe flooding and damage downstream.
- April 16 – Natural Bridges National Monument is established
- April 19 – The Garfield Park Conservatory in Chicago, designed by Jens Jensen, opens to the public for the first time.
- April 24 – The seventh deadliest tornado in U.S. history strikes the towns of Amite, Louisiana, Pine, Louisiana and Purvis, Mississippi, killing 143 and injuring 770.

=== May ===
- May 10 – Mother's Day is observed for the first time, at Andrew's Methodist Church in Grafton, West Virginia.

=== June ===
- June 20 – The Georgia Tech Alumni Association is chartered in Atlanta, Georgia.

=== July ===
- July 1 – Carson National Forest is established.
- July 11 – The Western University of Pennsylvania is renamed the University of Pittsburgh.
- July 22 – The automobile manufacturing company Fisher Body is founded.
- July 25 – John Baxter Taylor, graduate of the University of Pennsylvania, becomes the first African American to win an Olympic Gold Medal (in the men's 400-metre relay) at the London Summer Olympics
- July 26 – Attorney General Charles Joseph Bonaparte issues an order to staff the Office of the Chief Examiner (later renamed the Federal Bureau of Investigation) immediately.

=== August ===
- August 8 – The Hoover Company of Canton, Ohio, acquires manufacturing rights to the upright portable vacuum cleaner patented on June 22 by James M. Spangler.
- August 14 – Springfield Race Riot of 1908 in Springfield, Illinois.
- August 31 – A charter is granted for Wayland Literary and Technical Institute in Plainview, Texas, later Wayland Baptist University.

=== September ===
- September 16 – William C. Durant founds the company which eventually becomes General Motors.
- September 17 – At Fort Myer, Virginia, U.S.A. Thomas Selfridge becomes the first person to die in an airplane crash. The pilot, Orville Wright, is severely injured in the crash, but makes a recovery.
- September 28 – Classes commence at Benjamin Franklin Institute of Technology in Boston, Massachusetts, established under the terms of Franklin's will.

=== October ===
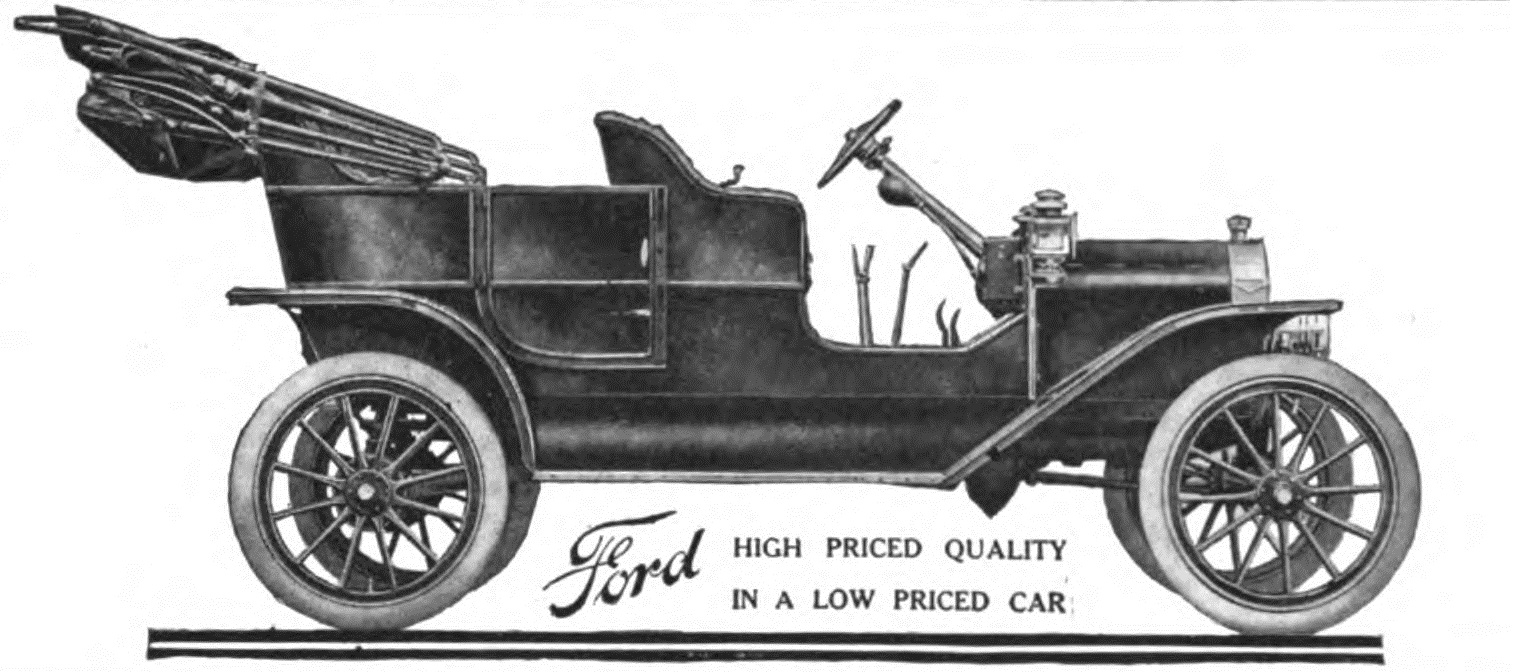
October 1: Ford Model T launch.

- October 1
  - Official launch of Henry Ford's Ford Model T automobile, the first having left the Ford Piquette Avenue Plant in Detroit, Michigan, on September 27. The initial price is set at $850.
  - Penny Post is established between the United Kingdom and United States.
- October 5 – The Melting Pot, a play by Israel Zangwill, opens in Washington, D.C. The title quickly becomes a widely used symbol for assimilation of immigrants to the United States.
- October 8 – The University of Omaha, precursor of the University of Nebraska Omaha, is founded as a private non-sectarian college.
- October 10 – First section of Long Island Motor Parkway opened.
- October 13 – The Church of the Nazarene is organized officially at Pilot Point, Texas as the Pentecostal Church of the Nazarene. This is the official "birthday" of the denomination.
- October 14 – The Chicago Cubs win the 1908 World Series defeating the Detroit Tigers in Game 5. They would not win again until November 2, 2016, which stands as the longest championship drought in sports history.
- October 15 – The Metz Fire in Metz Township, Michigan; 37 people are killed, 134 families—about 700 people— are made homeless.

=== November ===
- November 3 – 1908 United States presidential election: Republican William Howard Taft defeats Democrat William Jennings Bryan.
- November 24 – The first credit union in the United States begins operation in Manchester, New Hampshire.

=== Undated ===
- The American Temperance University closes.

=== Ongoing ===
- Progressive Era (1890s–1920s)
- Lochner era (c. 1897–c. 1937)
- Black Patch Tobacco Wars (1904–1909)
- Great White Fleet voyage (1907–1909)

== Births ==
=== January – March ===
- January 1 – Bill Tapia, musician (died 2011)
- January 11 – Lionel Stander, actor (died 1994)
- January 14 – Russ Columbo, singer, bandleader, and composer (died 1934)
- January 17 – Cus D'Amato, boxing trainer (died 1985)
- January 20 – Fleur Cowles, painter and editor (died 2009)
- January 27 – Oran "Hot Lips" Page, Jazz musician (died 1954)
- February 2 – Justice M. Chambers, Medal of Honor recipient (died 1982)
- February 5 – Edith Ceccarelli, supercentenarian (died 2024)
- February 6
  - Russell Gleason, actor (died 1945)
  - Michael Maltese, screenwriter (died 1981)
- February 10 – Charles Henri Ford, novelist, poet, filmmaker, photographer and collage artist (died 2002)
- February 13 – Pauline Frederick, journalist (died 1990)
- February 17 – Red Barber, baseball announcer and sports journalist (died 1992)
- February 25 – George Duning, film composer (died 2000)
- February 26 – Tex Avery, Cartoonist (died 1980)
- February 29 – Dee Brown, writer and historian (died 2002)
- March 4 – T.R.M. Howard, African-American civil rights leader and surgeon (died 1976)
- March 5 – Irving Fiske, American playwright, WPA writer and speaker; co-created Quarry Hill Creative Center in Rochester, Vermont, early children's rights activist; died 1990)
- March 13 – Walter Annenberg, Publisher and philanthropist (died 2002)
- March 14 – Ed Heinemann, aircraft designer (died 1991)
- March 20
  - Kermit Murdock, actor (died 1981)
  - Frank Stanton, businessman (died 2006)
- March 22 – Louis L'Amour, author (died 1988)
- March 26 – Henry (Hank) Sylvern, Radio personality (died 1964)
- March 29 – Arthur O'Connell, Actor (died 1981)

=== April – June ===
- April 1 – Abraham Maslow, psychologist (died 1970)
- April 2 – Buddy Ebsen, actor and dancer (died 2003)
- April 4
  - Ernestine Gilbreth Carey, author (died 2006)
  - Frances Ford Seymour, socialite (died 1950)
- April 5 – Bette Davis, actress (died 1989)
- April 6 – John P. Davies, diplomat (died 1999)
- April 15 – eden ahbez, musician (died 1995)
- April 20 – Lionel Hampton, African-American musician and bandleader (died 2002)
- April 25 – Edward R. Murrow, journalist (died 1965)
- April 26 – Fred Phillips, make-up artist (died 1993)
- April 29 – Jack Williamson, science fiction author (died 2006)
- May 3 – Howard Cary, American engineer & founder of Cary Instruments (died 1991)
- May 10 – Helen Elsie Austin, American attorney (died 2004)
- May 20 – James Stewart, actor (died 1997)
- May 23
  - Max Abramovitz, architect (died 2004)
  - John Bardeen, physicist, Nobel Prize laureate (died 1991)
- May 25 – Theodore Roethke, poet (died 1963)
- May 30 – Mel Blanc, voice actor (died 1989)
- May 31 – Don Ameche, actor (died 1993)
- June 13 – Marjorie F. Lambert, archaeologist & anthropologist (died 2006)
- June 18 – Bud Collyer, voice actor and game show host (died 1969)
- June 20 – Billy Werber, baseball player (died 2009)
- June 21
  - William Frankena, moral philosopher (died 1994)
  - Marjorie Gladman, tennis player (died 1999)
- June 23 – Karl Warner, athlete (died 1995)
- June 25
  - Joe Becker, baseball player (died 1998)
  - Willard Van Orman Quine, philosopher (died 2000)
- June 26 – William F. Knowland, United States Senator from California from 1945 till 1959. Politician and newspaperman (died 1974)
- June 27
  - Bill Kennedy, actor (died 1997)
  - Charles Stevenson, philosopher (died 1979)
- June 29
  - Leroy Anderson, composer (died 1975)
  - Sally Haley, painter (died 2007)
- June 30 – Eunice Norton, pianist (died 2005)

=== July – September ===
- July 1 – Alvino Rey, swing era musician and bandleader (died 2004)
- July 3 – M. F. K. Fisher, food writer (died 1992)
- July 5
  - Lyman S. Ayres II, businessman (died 1996)
  - Don Dunphy, television and radio sports announcer (died 1998)
- July 8 – Nelson A. Rockefeller, 49th governor of New York from 1959 to 1973 and 41st vice president of the United States from 1974 to 1977 (died 1979)
- July 12 – Milton Berle, comedian (died 2002)
- July 19 – Daniel Fry, contactee (died 1992)
- July 21
  - William E. Jenner, U.S. Senator from Indiana from 1947 to 1959 (died 1985)
  - Jug McSpaden, professional golfer (died 1996)
  - Magruder Tuttle, rear admiral, football player (died 1998)
- July 22 – Claire Falkenstein, sculptor, painter, printmaker, jewelry designer and teacher (died 1997)
- July 23
  - Karl Swenson, actor (died 1978)
  - James C. Tison Jr., admiral and civil engineer (died 1991)
- July 25 – Kathryn Eames, actress (died 2004)
- July 27 – Joseph Mitchell, writer (died 1996)
- July 31 – Bill Shadel, Radio and TV news anchor (died 2005)
- August 2 – Al Alquist, California politician (died 2006)
- August 9 – A. I. Bezzerides, screenwriter (died 2007)
- August 10 – Claude Thornhill, pianist, arranger, composer and bandleader (died 1965)
- August 16
  - Orlando Cole, classical cellist and educator (died 2010)
  - William Maxwell, novelist and editor (died 2000)** Miriam Rosen Minsker, centenarian (died 2017)
- August 20 – Al López, baseball player and manager (died 2005)
- August 21 – Tom Tully, actor (died 1982)
- August 27 – Lyndon B. Johnson, 36th president of the United States from 1963 to 1969, 37th vice president of the United States from 1961 to 1963 (died 1973)
- August 28 – Roger Tory Peterson, naturalist, artist and educator (died 1996)
- August 30 – Fred MacMurray, actor (died 1991)
- August 31 – William Saroyan, fiction writer (died 1981)
- September 2
  - Ruth Bancroft, landscape and garden designer (died 2017)
  - Dorothea Leighton, social psychiatrist (died 1989)
- September 4 – Richard Wright, African-American author (died 1960 in France)
- September 6 – Korczak Ziolkowski, sculptor (died 1982)
- September 7
  - Paul Brown, football coach (died 1991)
  - Michael E. DeBakey, surgeon and medical researcher (died 2008)
- September 10 – Raymond Scott, composer, bandleader, electronic music pioneer (died 1994)
- September 13 – Mae Questel, actress (died 1998)
- September 15 – Penny Singleton, actress (died 2003)
- September 16 – Neil Reagan, radio station manager, and CBS senior producer (died 1996)
- September 29 – Eddie Tolan, athlete (died 1967)

=== October – December ===
- October 6 – Carole Lombard, film actress (died 1942)
- October 9 – Lee Wiley, jazz singer (died 1975)
- October 14 – Ruth Hale, playwright and actress (died 2003)
- October 15 – Herman Chittison, pianist (died 1967)
- October 20
  - Geraldine Branch, gynecologist (died 2016)
  - Carl Stuart Hamblen, musician and presidential candidate (died 1989)
- October 22 – John Gould, humorist, essayist and columnist (died 2003)
- October 25 – Polly Ann Young, actress (died 1997)
- October 27 – Lee Krasner, American painter (died 1984)
- November 1 – Felix Knight, actor, tenor, and vocal coach (Babes in Toyland (1934)) (died 1998)
- November 8 – Martha Gellhorn, war correspondent (suicide 1998 in the United Kingdom)
- November 12 – Harry Blackmun, judge (died 1999)
- November 14 – Joseph McCarthy, U.S. Senator from Wisconsin (died 1957)
- November 18 – Imogene Coca, actress (died 2001)
- November 20 – Alistair Cooke, English-born journalist (died 2004)
- November 23 – Nelson S. Bond, science fiction writer (died 2006)
- November 28 – Mary Oppen, activist, artist, photographer and writer (died 1990)
- November 29 – Adam Clayton Powell Jr., politician (died 1972)
- December 3 – Edward Underdown, actor (died 1989)
- December 4 – Alfred Hershey, bacteriologist, Nobel Prize laureate (died 1997)
- December 6 – Baby Face Nelson, bank robber (died 1934)
- December 7 – Slim Bryant, country music singer, songwriter and guitarist (died 2010)
- December 11 – Elliott Carter, composer (died 2012)
- December 14 – Morey Amsterdam, actor and comedian (died 1996)
- December 16 – Frances Day, actress and singer (died 1984)
- December 17 – Willard Libby, chemist, Nobel Prize laureate (died 1980)
- December 21 – Herbert Hutner, banker and lawyer (died 2008)
- December 23 – Sol Carter, baseball player (died 2006)

== Deaths ==
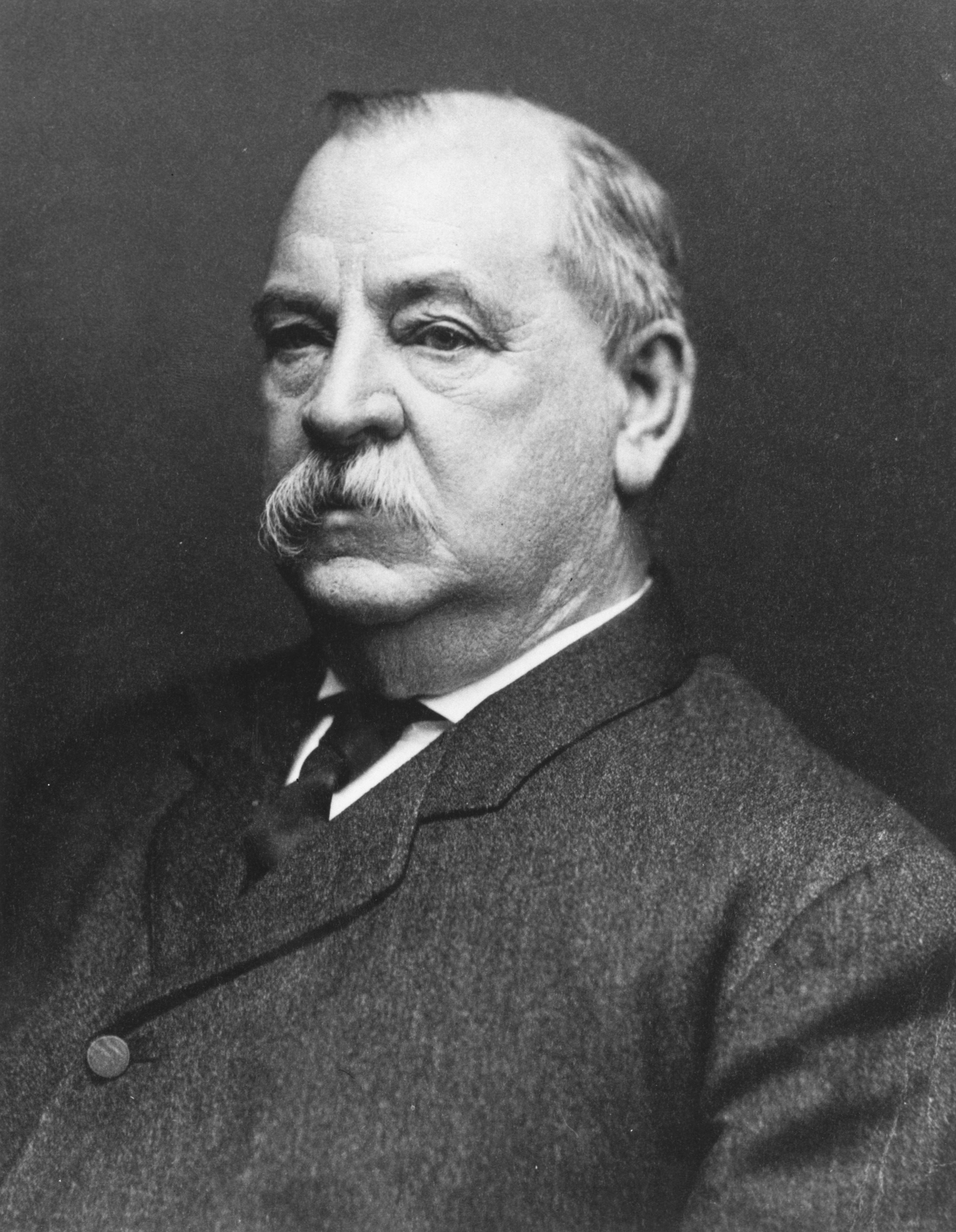
Grover Cleveland

- February 1 – Sara Iredell Fleetwood, African-American nurse and teacher (born 1849)
- February 21 – Harriet Hosmer, neoclassical sculptor, first female professional sculptor (born 1830)
- March 25 – Durham Stevens, diplomat (born 1851)
- March 26 – Louis Chauvin, ragtime pianist (born 1881)
- March 27 – Charles N. Sims, Methodist preacher, third chancellor of Syracuse University (born 1835)
- April 19 – Simon B. Conover, U.S. Senator from Florida from 1873 to 1879 (born 1840)
- April 20 – Henry Chadwick, English-born baseball writer and historian (born 1824)
- May 14 – John O'Connell, baseball player (born 1872)
- June 1 – James Kimbrough Jones, U.S. Senator from Arkansas from 1885 to 1903 (born 1839)
- June 9 – Drusilla Wilson, American temperance leader and Quaker pastor (born 1815)
- June 13 – Henry Lomb, German-American optician, co-founder of Bausch & Lomb (born 1848)
- June 14 – Frederick Stanley, 16th Earl of Derby, founder of the Stanley Cup (born 1841)
- June 24 – Grover Cleveland, 22nd and 24th president of the United States from 1885 to 1889 and from 1893 to 1897 (born 1837)
- July 3 – Joel Chandler Harris, author (born 1848)
- July 10 – Phoebe Knapp, hymn composer (born 1839)
- July 29 – Estelle M. H. Merrill, journalist (born 1858)
- August 4 – William B. Allison, U.S. Senator from Iowa from 1873 to 1908 (born 1829)
- August 26 – Tony Pastor, vaudeville and theater impresario (born 1837)
- September 17 – Thomas Selfridge, army officer & first aviation casualty (born 1882)
- October 30 – Caroline Astor, socialite (born 1830)
- November 7 – Butch Cassidy, train and bank robber (born 1866)
- December 9 – William Harvey Carney, first African American to receive the Medal of Honor (born 1840)
- December 13 – Augustus Le Plongeon, photographer and antiquarian (born 1826)
- Jacob W. Davis, Latvian-born tailor, inventor of jeans (born 1831)

== See also ==
- List of American films of 1908
- Timeline of United States history (1900–1929)
