= January 21 =

January 21 this year in various calendars
- Wednesday, 21 January 2026
Akan	Kwawukuo
Armenian	5 Mehekani 1475
Aztec	Toxcatl 11, 12 Quiyahuitl
Babylonian	1 Tebetu, 2336 SE
Balinese pawukon	Menga, Beteng, Jaya, Pon, Was, Buda of Medangkungan, Kala, Tulus, Sri
Bengali	7 Magh, BS 1432
Chinese	Yin Wood Goat・Wall Mansion; Wood Snake Year, Month 12, Day 3 (Dahan, 14 days until Lichun)
Common Era	21 January 2026 CE
Coptic	13 Tobi, AM 1742
Egyptian	10 Payni, 2774 NE
Ethiopian	13 Ṭer, 2018 Amätä Məhrät
French Republican	Décade I, Duodi de Pluviôse de l'Année 234 de la République
Gregorian	21 January, AD 2026
Hebrew	3 Shevat, AM 5786
Hindu	Dhaniṣṭhā・Vyatīpāta; Solar: 8 Māgha, 1947 SE; Lunisolar: Tr̥tīyā, Śukla pakṣa of Māgha, 2082 VE; Siddhārthin・5126 KY・1,872,596
Icelandic	Miðvikudagur, 29 Mörsugur 2025
Islamic	2 Sha'aban, AH 1447 (using tabular method)
ISO week date	2026-W04-3
Japanese	3 Shiwasu, Reiwa 8 (Daikan, 14 days until Risshun)
Julian	8 January, AD 2026 (AM 7534)
Julian day	2461062
Korean	3 Sodal, 4358 DE
Maya	13.0.13.4.19; 17 Muan, 12 Cauac
Roman	ante diem VI Idus Ianuarias, MMDCCLXXIX AUC
Solar Hijri	1 Bahman, SH 1404
Tibetan	3 rgyal, shing mo sbrul 2152 or 1771 or 999

<<	January					>>
Su	Mo	Tu	We	Th	Fr	Sa
				1	2	3
4	5	6	7	8	9	10
11	12	13	14	15	16	17
18	19	20	21	22	23	24
25	26	27	28	29	30	31
2026

January 21 in recent years
2026 (Wednesday)
2025 (Tuesday)
2024 (Sunday)
2023 (Saturday)
2022 (Friday)
2021 (Thursday)
2020 (Tuesday)
2019 (Monday)
2018 (Sunday)
2017 (Saturday)

January 21 is the 21st day of the year in the Gregorian calendar; 344 days remain until the end of the year (345 in leap years).

== Events ==
=== Pre-1600 ===
- 763 – Following the Battle of Bakhamra between Alids and Abbasids near Kufa, the Alid rebellion ends with the death of Ibrahim, brother of Isa ibn Musa.
- 1525 – The Swiss Anabaptist Movement is founded when Conrad Grebel, Felix Manz, George Blaurock, and about a dozen others baptize each other in the home of Manz's mother in Zürich, breaking a thousand-year tradition of church-state union.
- 1535 – Following the Affair of the Placards, the French king leads an anti-Protestant procession through Paris.

=== 1601–1900 ===
- 1720 – Sweden and Prussia sign the Treaty of Stockholm.
- 1749 – The Teatro Filarmonico in Verona is destroyed by fire, as a result of a torch being left behind in the box of a nobleman after a performance. It is rebuilt in 1754.
- 1774 – Abdul Hamid I becomes Sultan of the Ottoman Empire and Caliph of Islam.
- 1789 – The first American novel, The Power of Sympathy or the Triumph of Nature Founded in Truth by William Hill Brown, is printed in Boston.
- 1793 – After being found guilty of treason by the French National Convention, Louis XVI of France is executed by guillotine.
- 1824 – The Ashantis defeat British forces in the Gold Coast during the First Anglo-Ashanti War.
- 1854 – The RMS Tayleur sinks off Lambay Island on her maiden voyage from Liverpool to Australia with great loss of life.
- 1893 – The Tati Concessions Land, formerly part of Matabeleland, is formally annexed to the Bechuanaland Protectorate, now Botswana.

=== 1901–present ===
- 1908 – New York City passes the Sullivan Ordinance, making it illegal for women to smoke in public, only to have the measure vetoed by the mayor.
- 1911 – The first Monte Carlo Rally takes place.
- 1915 – Kiwanis International is founded in Detroit.
- 1919 – A revolutionary Irish parliament is founded and declares the independence of the Irish Republic. One of the first engagements of the Irish War of Independence takes place.
- 1925 – Albania declares itself a republic.
- 1931 – Sir Isaac Isaacs is sworn in as the first Australian-born Governor-General of Australia.
- 1932 – Finland and the Soviet Union sign a non-aggression treaty.
- 1941 – Sparked by the murder of a German officer in Bucharest, Romania, the day before, members of the Iron Guard engage in a rebellion and pogrom killing 125 Jews.
- 1942 – The Jewish resistance organization, Fareynikte Partizaner Organizatsye, based in the Vilna Ghetto is established.
- 1945 – The Trade Union Council of Transcarpathian Ukraine is founded in Mukachevo.
- 1948 – The Flag of Quebec is adopted and flown for the first time over the National Assembly of Quebec. The day is marked annually as Québec Flag Day.
- 1950 – American lawyer and government official Alger Hiss is convicted of perjury.
- 1951 – The catastrophic eruption of Mount Lamington in Papua New Guinea claims 2,942 lives.
- 1954 – The first nuclear-powered submarine, the USS Nautilus, is launched in Groton, Connecticut by Mamie Eisenhower, the First Lady of the United States.
- 1960 – Little Joe 1B, a Mercury spacecraft, lifts off from Wallops Island, Virginia, with Miss Sam, a female rhesus monkey, on board.
- 1960 – Avianca Flight 671 crashes at Montego Bay, Jamaica airport, killing 37 people.
- 1960 – A coal mine collapses at Holly Country, South Africa, killing 435 miners.
- 1963 – The Chicago North Shore and Milwaukee Railroad ends operation.
- 1968 – Vietnam War, Battle of Khe Sanh: One of the most publicized and controversial battles of the war begins.
- 1968 – A B-52 bomber crashes near Thule Air Base, contaminating the area after its nuclear payload ruptures. One of the four bombs remains unaccounted for after the cleanup operation is complete.
- 1971 – The current Emley Moor transmitting station, the tallest free-standing structure in the United Kingdom, begins transmitting UHF broadcasts.
- 1976 – Commercial service of Concorde begins with the London-Bahrain and Paris-Rio routes.
- 1980 – Iran Air Flight 291 crashes in the Alborz Mountains while on approach to Mehrabad International Airport in Tehran, Iran, killing 128 people.
- 1981 – Production of the DeLorean sports car begins in Dunmurry, Northern Ireland, United Kingdom.
- 1985 – Galaxy Airlines Flight 203 crashes near Reno–Tahoe International Airport in Reno, Nevada, killing 70 people.
- 1986 – Conservative protestors attack a mock shanty town that had been erected on the Green at Dartmouth College as part of anti-apartheid protests.
- 1997 – The U.S. House of Representatives votes 395–28 to reprimand Newt Gingrich for ethics violations, making him the first Speaker of the House to be so disciplined.
- 1999 – War on drugs: In one of the largest drug busts in American history, the United States Coast Guard intercepts a ship with over 4,300 kilograms (9,500 lb) of cocaine on board.
- 2000 – Ecuador: After the Ecuadorian Congress is seized by indigenous organizations, Col. Lucio Gutiérrez, Carlos Solorzano and Antonio Vargas depose President Jamil Mahuad. Gutierrez is later replaced by Gen. Carlos Mendoza, who resigns and allows Vice-President Gustavo Noboa to succeed Mahuad.
- 2003 – A 7.6 magnitude earthquake strikes the Mexican state of Colima, killing 29 and leaving approximately 10,000 people homeless.
- 2004 – NASA's MER-A (the Mars Rover Spirit) ceases communication with mission control. The problem lies in the management of its flash memory and is fixed remotely from Earth on February 6.
- 2005 – In Belmopan, Belize, the unrest over the government's new taxes erupts into riots.
- 2009 – Israel withdraws from the Gaza Strip, officially ending a three-week war it had with Hamas. However, intermittent fire by both sides continues in the weeks to follow.
- 2011 – Anti-government demonstrations take place in Tirana, Albania. Four people die from gunshots, allegedly fired from armed police protecting the Prime Minister's office.
- 2014 – Rojava conflict: The Jazira Canton declares its autonomy from the Syrian Arab Republic.
- 2017 – Over 400 cities across America and 160+ countries worldwide participate in a large-scale women's march, including in Portland, on Donald Trump's first full day as President of the United States.
- 2023 – Huu Can Tran, 72, opens fire in a dance studio in Monterey Park, California, killing eleven people and injuring nine others before later committing suicide. It is the worst mass shooting in Los Angeles County since the 2008 Covina massacre.
- 2025 – A fire at the Grand Kartal Hotel in the Kartalkaya ski resort in Bolu Province, Turkey, results in 78 people dead and 51 injured.

== Births ==
=== Pre-1600 ===
- 1264 – Alexander, Prince of Scotland (died 1284)
- 1277 – Galeazzo I Visconti, lord of Milan (died 1328)
- 1338 – Charles V of France (died 1380)
- 1493 – Giovanni Poggio, Italian cardinal and diplomat (died 1556)
- 1598 – Matsudaira Tadamasa, Japanese samurai and daimyō (died 1645)

=== 1601–1900 ===
- 1612 – Henry Casimir I of Nassau-Dietz, count of Nassau-Dietz (died 1640)
- 1636 – Melchiorre Cafà, Maltese Baroque sculptor (baptised; died 1667)
- 1655 – Antonio Molinari, Italian painter (died 1704)
- 1659 – Adriaen van der Werff, Dutch painter (died 1722)
- 1675 – Duchess Sibylle of Saxe-Lauenburg, Margravine of Baden-Baden (died 1733)
- 1714 – Anna Morandi Manzolini, Italian anatomist (died 1774)
- 1717 – Antonio María de Bucareli y Ursúa, Spanish military officer and governor of Cuba (died 1779)
- 1721 – James Murray, Scottish-English general and politician, Governor of Minorca (died 1794)
- 1732 – Frederick II Eugene, Duke of Württemberg, son of Karl Alexander, Duke of Württemberg, and Princess Maria Augusta of Thurn and Taxis (died 1797)
- 1738 – Ethan Allen, American general (died 1789)
- 1741 – Chaim of Volozhin, Orthodox rabbi (died 1821)
- 1763 – Augustin Robespierre, younger brother of French Revolutionary leader Maximilien Robespierre (died 1794)
- 1775 – Manuel Garcia, Spanish opera singer and composer (died 1832)
- 1784 – Peter De Wint, English painter (died 1849)
- 1788 – William Henry Smyth, Royal Navy officer, hydrographer, astronomer and numismatist (died 1865)
- 1796 – Princess Marie of Hesse-Kassel, consort of George, Grand Duke of Mecklenburg-Strelitz (died 1880)
- 1797 – Joseph Méry, French author and journalist (died 1866)
- 1800 – Theodor Fliedner, German Lutheran minister (died 1864)
- 1801 – John Batman, Australian entrepreneur and explorer (died 1839)
- 1804 – Moritz von Schwind, Austrian painter (died 1871)
- 1808 – Juan Crisóstomo Torrico, 16th President of Peru (died 1875)
- 1810 – Pierre Louis Charles de Failly, French general (died 1892)
- 1811 – James Hamilton, 1st Duke of Abercorn, British statesman (died 1885)
- 1813 – John C. Frémont, American general, explorer, and politician, 5th Territorial Governor of Arizona (died 1890)
- 1813 – Giuseppe Montanelli, Italian statesman and author (died 1862)
- 1814 – Johann Georg Theodor Grässe, German bibliographer and historian (died 1885)
- 1815 – Horace Wells, American dentist (died 1848)
- 1820 – Joseph Wolf, German ornithologist and illustrator (died 1899)
- 1820 – Egide Walschaerts, Belgian mechanical engineer (died 1901)
- 1824 – Stonewall Jackson, American general (died 1863)
- 1827 – Ivan Mikheevich Pervushin, Russian mathematician and theorist (died 1900)
- 1829 – Oscar II of Sweden (died 1907)
- 1831 – George Kerferd, English-Australian politician, 10th Premier of Victoria (died 1889)
- 1839 – Caterina Volpicelli, Italian Roman Catholic nun (died 1894)
- 1840 – Sophia Jex-Blake, English physician and feminist (died 1912)
- 1841 – Édouard Schuré, French philosopher and author (died 1929)
- 1843 – Émile Levassor, French engineer (died 1897)
- 1845 – Harriet Backer, Norwegian painter (died 1932)
- 1846 – Pieter Hendrik Schoute, Dutch mathematician and academic (died 1923)
- 1846 – Albert Lavignac, French music scholar (died 1916)
- 1847 – Joseph Achille Le Bel, French chemist (died 1930)
- 1848 – Henri Duparc, French soldier and composer (died 1933)
- 1851 – Giuseppe Allamano, Italian Roman Catholic priest (died 1926)
- 1854 – Karl Julius Beloch, German classical and economic historian (died 1929)
- 1854 – Eusapia Palladino, Italian spiritualist (died 1918)
- 1855 – Princess Maria Luisa of Bourbon-Two Sicilies, the youngest daughter of King Ferdinand II of the Two Sicilies (died 1874)
- 1860 – Karl Staaff, Swedish lawyer and politician, 11th Prime Minister of Sweden (died 1915)
- 1864 – Israel Zangwill, British author (died 1926)
- 1865 – Heinrich Albers-Schonberg, German gynecologist and radiologist (died 1921)
- 1867 – Ludwig Thoma, German paramedic and author (died 1921)
- 1867 – Maxime Weygand, Belgian-French general (died 1965)
- 1868 – Felix Hoffmann, German chemist (died 1946)
- 1869 – Grigori Rasputin, Russian mystic (died 1916)
- 1871 – Olga Preobrajenska, Russian ballerina (died 1962)
- 1873 – Arturo Labriola, Italian revolutionary syndicalist (died 1959)
- 1874 – René-Louis Baire, French mathematician (died 1932)
- 1875 – Paul E. Kahle, German orientalist (died 1964)
- 1877 – Baldassarre Negroni, Italian director and screenwriter (died 1948)
- 1878 – Vahan Tekeyan, Armenian poet and activist (died 1948)
- 1880 – George Van Biesbroeck, Belgian–American astronomer (died 1974)
- 1881 – Ernst Fast, Swedish runner (died 1959)
- 1881 – André Godard, French archaeologist, architect and historian (died 1965)
- 1881 – Ivan Ribar, Yugoslav politician (died 1968)
- 1882 – Pavel Florensky, Russian mathematician and theologian (died 1937)
- 1882 – Francis Gailey, Australian-American swimmer (died 1972)
- 1883 – Olav Aukrust, Norwegian poet and educator (died 1929)
- 1883 – Oskar Baum, Bohemian writer (died 1941)
- 1883 – Mathias Hynes, British tug of war competitor (died 1926)
- 1885 – Duncan Grant, British painter and designer (died 1978)
- 1885 – Umberto Nobile, Italian engineer and explorer (died 1978)
- 1885 – Harold A. Wilson, English runner (died 1932)
- 1886 – John M. Stahl, American director and producer (died 1950)
- 1887 – Wolfgang Köhler, German psychologist and phenomenologist (died 1967)
- 1887 – Ernest Holmes, American New Thought writer (died 1960)
- 1887 – Georges Vézina, Canadian ice hockey player (died 1926)
- 1889 – Pitirim Sorokin, American sociologist and political activist (died 1968)
- 1889 – Edith Tolkien, wife and muse of J. R. R. Tolkien (died 1971)
- 1891 – Albert Battel, German Army lieutenant and lawyer (died 1952)
- 1891 – Francisco Lázaro, Portuguese marathon runner (died 1912)
- 1895 – Cristóbal Balenciaga, Spanish fashion designer, founded Balenciaga (died 1972)
- 1895 – Daniel Chalonge, French astrophysicist and astronomer (died 1977)
- 1895 – Noe Itō, Japanese anarchist, author and feminist (died 1923)
- 1896 – Guy Gilpatric, American pilot and journalist (died 1950)
- 1896 – Paula Hitler, younger sister of Adolf Hitler (died 1960)
- 1896 – J. Carrol Naish, American actor (died 1973)
- 1896 – Masa Perttilä, Finnish wrestler (died 1968)
- 1897 – René Iché, French sculptor (died 1954)
- 1898 – Rudolph Maté, Polish-Hungarian-American cinematographer, producer and director (died 1964)
- 1898 – Ahmad Shah Qajar, Shah of Persia (died 1930)
- 1898 – Eduard Zintl, German chemist (died 1941)
- 1899 – John Bodkin Adams, British general practitioner and convict (died 1983)
- 1899 – Gyula Mándi, Hungarian footballer and manager (died 1969)
- 1899 – Alexander Tcherepnin, Russian-American pianist and composer (died 1977)
- 1900 – Elof Ahrle, Swedish actor and director (died 1965)
- 1900 – Anselm Franz, Austrian engineer (died 1994)
- 1900 – Fernando Quiroga Palacios, Spanish Cardinal (died 1971)

=== 1901–present ===
- 1901 – Ricardo Zamora, Spanish footballer and manager (died 1978)
- 1903 – William Lyon, American film editor (died 1974)
- 1903 – Raymond Suvigny, French weightlifter (died 1945)
- 1904 – John Porter, Canadian ice hockey player (died 1997)
- 1904 – Puck van Heel, Dutch footballer (died 1984)
- 1905 – Christian Dior, French fashion designer, founded Christian Dior S.A. (died 1957)
- 1905 – Karl Wallenda, German-American acrobat and tightrope walker, founded The Flying Wallendas (died 1978)
- 1906 – Igor Moiseyev, Russian choreographer (died 2007)
- 1907 – Carlo Cavagnoli, Italian boxer (died 1991)
- 1909 – Todor Skalovski, Macedonian composer and conductor (died 2004)
- 1909 – Teofilo Spasojević, Serbian footballer (died 1970)
- 1910 – Rosa Kellner, German athlete (died 1984)
- 1910 – Albert Rosellini, American lawyer and politician, 15th Governor of Washington (died 2011)
- 1910 – Hideo Shinojima, Japanese footballer (died 1975)
- 1910 – Károly Takács, Hungarian shooter (died 1976)
- 1911 – Dick Garrard, Australian wrestler (died 2003)
- 1911 – Lee Yoo-hyung, Korean footballer and manager (died 2003)
- 1912 – Konrad Emil Bloch, German-American biochemist and academic, Nobel Prize laureate (died 2000)
- 1915 – André Lichnerowicz, French mathematician (died 1998)
- 1915 – Orazio Mariani, Italian sprinter (died 1981)
- 1916 – Pietro Rava, Italian footballer (died 2006)
- 1916 – Zypora Spaisman, Polish midwife; American and Yiddish-language actress; producer of the Yiddish stage (died 2002)
- 1917 – Erling Persson, H&M founder (died 2002)
- 1918 – Jimmy Hagan, English footballer (died 1998)
- 1918 – Antonio Janigro, Italian cellist and conductor (died 1989)
- 1918 – Richard Winters, American soldier (died 2011)
- 1919 – Eric Brown, Scottish-English captain and pilot (died 2016)
- 1920 – Errol Barrow, first Prime Minister of Barbados (died 1987)
- 1922 – Lincoln Alexander, Canadian lawyer and politician, 23rd Canadian Minister of Labour (died 2012)
- 1922 – Telly Savalas, American actor (died 1994)
- 1922 – Paul Scofield, English actor (died 2008)
- 1922 – Predrag Vranicki, Croatian Marxist humanist (died 2002)
- 1923 – Alberto de Mendoza, Argentine actor (died 2011)
- 1923 – Lola Flores, Spanish singer, dancer, and actress (died 1995)
- 1923 – Pahiño, Spanish footballer (died 2012)
- 1924 – Shafiga Akhundova, Azerbaijani Composer, first professional female author of an opera in the East (died 2013)
- 1924 – Benny Hill, English actor, singer, and screenwriter (died 1992)
- 1925 – Charles Aidman, American actor (died 1993)
- 1925 – Alex Forbes, Scottish footballer (died 2014)
- 1925 – Eva Ibbotson, Austrian-English author (died 2010)
- 1925 – Arnold Skaaland, American wrestler and manager (died 2007)
- 1926 – Clive Donner, British director (died 2010)
- 1926 – Franco Evangelisti, Italian composer (died 1980)
- 1926 – Steve Reeves, American bodybuilder and actor (died 2000)
- 1926 – Roger Taillibert, French architect (died 2019)
- 1926 – Robert J. White, American neurosurgeon (died 2010)
- 1927 – Clive Churchill, Australian rugby league player and coach (died 1985)
- 1927 – Rudolf Kraus, German footballer (died 2003)
- 1928 – Reynaldo Bignone, Argentinian general and politician, 41st President of Argentina (died 2018)
- 1928 – Gene Sharp, American political scientist and academic, founded the Albert Einstein Institution (died 2018)
- 1929 – Radley Metzger, American filmmaker (died 2017)
- 1930 – Mainza Chona, Zambian lawyer and politician, 1st Prime Minister of Zambia (died 2001)
- 1930 – Valentin Filatyev, Soviet cosmonaut (died 1990)
- 1931 – Yoshiko Kuga, Japanese actress (died 2024)
- 1933 – Tony Marchi, English footballer (died 2022)
- 1933 – Habib Thiam, Senegalese politician (died 2017)
- 1934 – Audrey Dalton, Irish actress
- 1934 – Antonio Karmany, Spanish cyclist
- 1934 – Alfonso Portugal, Mexican footballer (died 2016)
- 1934 – Ann Wedgeworth, American actress (died 2017)
- 1936 – Dick Davies, American basketball player (died 2012)
- 1937 – Judit Ágoston-Mendelényi, Hungarian fencer (died 2013)
- 1937 – Prince Max, Duke in Bavaria, the youngest son of Albrecht, Duke of Bavaria
- 1938 – Wolfman Jack, radio personality (died 1995)
- 1938 – Romano Fogli, Italian footballer (died 2021)
- 1939 – Paul Genevay, French sprinter (died 2022)
- 1939 – Friedel Lutz, German footballer (died 2023)
- 1939 – Steve Paxton, American dancer and choreographer (died 2024)
- 1939 – Viacheslav Platonov, Russian volleyball player and coach (died 2005)
- 1940 – Jack Nicklaus, American golfer and sportscaster
- 1940 – Patrick Robinson, English novelist
- 1941 – Sattam bin Abdulaziz Al Saud, Saudi Arabian prince (died 2013)
- 1941 – Plácido Domingo, Spanish tenor and conductor
- 1941 – Richie Havens, American singer-songwriter and guitarist (died 2013)
- 1941 – Mike Medavoy, Chinese-born American film producer, co-founded Orion Pictures
- 1941 – Ivan Putski, Polish-American wrestler and bodybuilder
- 1941 – Elaine Showalter, American author and critic
- 1942 – Freddy Breck, German singer, producer, and news anchor (died 2008)
- 1942 – Eugène Camara, Prime Minister of Guinea (died 2019)
- 1942 – Mac Davis, American singer-songwriter, guitarist, and actor (died 2020)
- 1942 – Han Pil-hwa, North Korean speed skater
- 1942 – Edwin Starr, American singer-songwriter (died 2003)
- 1942 – Michael G. Wilson, American producer and screenwriter
- 1943 – Zdravko Hebel, Croatian water polo player (died 2017)
- 1943 – Arnar Jónsson, Icelandic actor
- 1943 – Alfons Peeters, Belgian footballer (died 2015)
- 1943 – Kenzo Yokoyama, Japanese footballer
- 1944 – Uto Ughi, Italian violinist
- 1945 – Arthur Beetson, Australian rugby league player and coach (died 2011)
- 1945 – Pete Kircher, English drummer
- 1945 – Martin Shaw, English actor and producer
- 1946 – Ichiro Hosotani, Japanese footballer
- 1946 – Nella Martinetti, Swiss singer (died 2011)
- 1946 – Tomás Pineda, El Salvadoran footballer
- 1946 – Miguel Reina, Spanish footballer
- 1947 – Andrzej Bachleda, Polish former alpine skier
- 1947 – Jill Eikenberry, American actress
- 1947 – Dorian M. Goldfeld, American mathematician
- 1947 – Pye Hastings, Scottish singer-songwriter and guitarist
- 1947 – Michel Jonasz, French singer-songwriter and actor
- 1947 – Joseph Nicolosi, American clinical psychologist (died 2017)
- 1947 – Giuseppe Savoldi, Italian footballer (died 2026)
- 1947 – Roberto Zywica, Argentine footballer (died 2025)
- 1948 – Zygmunt Kukla, Polish footballer (died 2016)
- 1948 – Hugo Tocalli, Argentine footballer
- 1949 – Clifford Ray, American basketball coach and player
- 1949 – Trương Tấn Sang, Vietnamese politician and 7th President of Vietnam
- 1950 – Marion Becker, German javelin thrower
- 1950 – Gary Locke, American politician and diplomat, 36th United States Secretary of Commerce
- 1950 – José Marín, Spanish racewalker
- 1950 – Billy Ocean, Trinidadian-English singer-songwriter
- 1950 – Agnes van Ardenne, Dutch politician and diplomat, Dutch Minister for Development Cooperation
- 1951 – Eric Holder, American lawyer, judge, and politician, 82nd United States Attorney General
- 1952 – Marco Camenisch, Swiss activist and murderer
- 1952 – Werner Grissmann, Austrian alpine skier
- 1952 – Mikhail Umansky, Russian chess player (died 2010)
- 1953 – Paul Allen, American businessman and philanthropist, co-founded Microsoft (died 2018)
- 1953 – Felipe Yáñez, Spanish cyclist
- 1954 – Thomas de Maizière, German politician of the Christian Democratic Union
- 1954 – Idrissa Ouedraogo, Burkinabé director, producer, and screenwriter (died 2018)
- 1954 – Phil Thompson, English footballer and coach
- 1955 – Peter Fleming, American tennis player
- 1955 – Jeff Koons, American painter and sculptor
- 1955 – Nello Musumeci, Italian politician and President of Sicily
- 1956 – Robby Benson, American actor and director
- 1956 – Geena Davis, American actress and producer
- 1958 – Hussein Saeed, Iraqi footballer
- 1958 – Matt Salmon, American politician
- 1958 – Sergei Walter, Ukrainian politician (died 2015)
- 1958 – Michael Wincott, Canadian actor
- 1959 – Sergei Alifirenko, Russian pistol shooter
- 1959 – Alex McLeish, Scottish footballer and manager
- 1960 – Sidney Lowe, American basketball player
- 1960 – Mike Terrana, American hard rock and heavy metal drummer
- 1961 – Kevin Cramer, American politician
- 1961 – Cornelia Pröll, Austrian alpine skier
- 1961 – Ivo Pukanić Croatian journalist (died 2008)
- 1961 – Gary Shaw, English footballer (died 2024)
- 1961 – Piotr Ugrumov, Russian cyclist
- 1962 – Tyler Cowen, American economist and academic
- 1962 – Isabelle Nanty, French actress, director and screenwriter
- 1962 – Gabriele Pin, Italian footballer and coach
- 1962 – Zoran Thaler, Slovenian politician
- 1962 – Marie Trintignant, French actress (died 2003)
- 1962 – Erik Verlinde, Dutch theoretical physicist
- 1963 – Hakeem Olajuwon, Nigerian-American basketball player
- 1963 – Detlef Schrempf, German basketball player and coach
- 1964 – Andreas Bauer, German ski jumper
- 1964 – Tony Dolan, English musician and actor
- 1964 – Gérald Passi, French footballer
- 1964 – Ricardo Serna, Spanish footballer
- 1964 – Aleksandar Šoštar, Serbian water polo player
- 1964 – Danny Wallace, English footballer
- 1965 – Robert Del Naja, British artist, musician and singer
- 1965 – Jam Master Jay, American DJ, rapper, and producer (died 2002)
- 1965 – Masahiro Wada, Japanese footballer
- 1967 – Ulf Dahlén, Swedish ice hockey player
- 1967 – Alfred Jermaniš, Slovenian footballer
- 1967 – Artashes Minasian, Armenian chess player
- 1967 – Gorō Miyazaki, Japanese film director and landscaper
- 1968 – Artur Dmitriev, Russian ice skater
- 1968 – Dmitry Fomin, Russian volleyball player
- 1968 – Sébastien Lifshitz, French director
- 1968 – Steven Marshall, Australian politician, 46th Premier of South Australia
- 1968 – Charlotte Ross, American actress
- 1968 – Ilya Smirin, Israeli chess Grandmaster
- 1969 – John Ducey, American actor
- 1969 – Eduard Hämäläinen, Finnish-Belarusian decathlete
- 1969 – Karina Lombard, French-American actress and singer
- 1969 – Tsubaki Nekoi, Japanese comic artist
- 1970 – Alen Bokšić, former Croatian footballer
- 1970 – Marina Foïs, French actress
- 1970 – Ken Leung, American actor
- 1970 – Oren Peli, Israeli-American director, producer and screenwriter
- 1971 – Uni Arge, Faroese footballer and entertainer
- 1971 – Rafael Berges, Spanish footballer
- 1971 – Doug Edwards, American basketball player
- 1971 – Dmitri Khlestov, Russian footballer
- 1971 – Sergey Klevchenya, Russian speed skater
- 1971 – Dylan Kussman, American actor
- 1971 – Doug Weight, American ice hockey player and coach
- 1972 – Billel Dziri, Algerian footballer and manager
- 1972 – Rick Falkvinge, Swedish businessman and politician
- 1972 – Sead Kapetanović, Bosnian footballer
- 1972 – Yasunori Mitsuda, Japanese composer and producer
- 1972 – Cat Power, American singer, musician and actress
- 1972 – Shawn Rojeski, American curler
- 1972 – Sabina Valbusa, Italian cross-country skier
- 1973 – Rob Hayles, English cyclist
- 1973 – Chris Kilmore, American musician and DJ
- 1973 – Edvinas Krungolcas, Lithuanian modern pentathlete
- 1973 – Flavio Maestri, Peruvian footballer
- 1974 – Malena Alterio, Spanish actress
- 1974 – Maxwell Atoms, American animator, screenwriter and voice actor
- 1974 – Kim Dotcom, German-Finnish Internet entrepreneur and political activist
- 1974 – Arthémon Hatungimana, Burundian middle-distance runner
- 1974 – Vincent Laresca, American actor
- 1974 – Ulrich Le Pen, French footballer
- 1974 – Marco Zanotti, Italian cyclist
- 1975 – Nicky Butt, English footballer and coach
- 1975 – Thomas Castaignède, French rugby player
- 1975 – Casey FitzRandolph, American speedskater
- 1975 – Yuji Ide, Japanese race car driver
- 1975 – Ito, Spanish footballer and manager
- 1975 – Willem Korsten, Dutch footballer
- 1975 – Jason Moran, American jazz pianist, composer and educator
- 1975 – Florin Șerban, Romanian director
- 1975 – Alyaksandr Yermakovich, Belarusian footballer and manager
- 1976 – Aivaras Abromavičius, Lithuanian-Ukrainian banker and politician; 15th Ukrainian Minister of Economic Development
- 1976 – Raivis Belohvoščiks, Latvian cyclist
- 1976 – Emma Bunton, English singer
- 1976 – Lars Eidinger, German actor
- 1976 – Giorgio Frezzolini, Italian footballer
- 1976 – Igors Stepanovs, Latvian footballer
- 1977 – Hussein Abdulghani, Saudi Arabian footballer
- 1977 – Bradley Carnell, South African footballer
- 1977 – John DeSantis, Canadian actor
- 1977 – Kirsten Münchow, German hammer thrower
- 1977 – Denis Lunghi, Italian cyclist
- 1977 – Ulrike Maisch, German runner
- 1977 – Phil Neville, English footballer and manager
- 1977 – Michael Ruffin, American basketball player
- 1977 – Jerry Trainor, American actor, director, and producer
- 1977 – Loïc Lerouge, French sprinter
- 1978 – Faris Al-Sultan, German triathlete
- 1978 – Hernán Rodrigo López, Uruguayan footballer
- 1978 – Peter von Allmen, Swiss cross-country skier
- 1978 – Andrei Zyuzin, Russian ice hockey player
- 1979 – Quinton Jacobs, Namibian footballer
- 1979 – Melendi, Spanish singer
- 1979 – Brian O'Driscoll, Irish rugby player
- 1980 – Karsten Forsterling, Australian rower
- 1980 – Lee Kyung-won, South Korean badminton player
- 1980 – Nana Mizuki, Japanese singer-songwriter and voice actress
- 1980 – Xavier Pons, Spanish rally diver
- 1981 – Gillian Chung, Hong Kong singer-songwriter and actress
- 1981 – Wu Hanxiong, Chinese fencer
- 1981 – Dany Heatley, Canadian ice hockey player
- 1981 – Andy Lee, South Korean singer and actor
- 1981 – Izabella Miko, Polish actress, dancer, and producer
- 1981 – Jung Ryeo-won, South Korean actress
- 1981 – David F. Sandberg, Swedish filmmaker
- 1981 – Michel Teló, Brazilian singer-songwriter
- 1982 – Richard José Blanco, Venezuelan footballer
- 1982 – Nicolas Mahut, French tennis player
- 1982 – Adriano Ferreira Martins, Brazilian footballer
- 1982 – Sarah Ourahmoune, French boxer
- 1982 – Simon Rolfes, German footballer
- 1983 – Alex Acker, American-Italian basketball player
- 1983 – Svetlana Khodchenkova, Russian actress
- 1983 – Asael Lubotzky, Israeli physician, author and molecular biologist
- 1983 – Maryse Mizanin, Canadian-American wrestler
- 1983 – Álvaro Quirós, Spanish golfer
- 1983 – Francesca Segat, Italian swimmer
- 1983 – Marieke van den Ham, Dutch water polo player
- 1983 – Kelly VanderBeek, Canadian alpine skier
- 1983 – Moritz Volz, German footballer
- 1984 – Luke Grimes, American actor
- 1984 – Haloti Ngata, American football player
- 1985 – Artur Beterbiev, Russian boxer
- 1985 – Aura Dione, Danish singer and songwriter
- 1985 – Yumi Hara, Japanese voice actress and singer
- 1985 – Sasha Pivovarova, Russian model and actress
- 1985 – Ri Se-gwang, North Korean artistic gymnast
- 1985 – Dmitri Sokolov, Russian basketball player
- 1985 – Ryan Suter, American ice hockey player
- 1986 – César Arzo, Spanish footballer
- 1986 – Edson Barboza, Brazilian mixed martial artist
- 1986 – Peyton Hillis, American football player
- 1986 – João Gomes Júnior, Brazilian swimmer
- 1986 – Javi López, Spanish footballer
- 1986 – Gina Mambrú, Dominican Republic volleyball player
- 1986 – Jonathan Quick, American ice hockey player
- 1986 – Sushant Singh Rajput, Indian actor (died 2020)
- 1986 – Óscar Vílchez, Peruvian footballer
- 1987 – Oskars Bārtulis, Latvian ice hockey player
- 1987 – Brandon Crawford, American baseball player
- 1987 – Aida Hadzialic, Swedish politician
- 1987 – Darren Helm, Canadian ice hockey player
- 1987 – Shaun Keeling, South African rower
- 1987 – Augustine Kiprono Choge, Kenyan runner
- 1987 – Will Johnson, Canadian soccer player
- 1987 – Dominik Roels, German cyclist
- 1987 – Maša Zec Peškirič, Slovenian tennis player
- 1987 – Ikumi Yoshimatsu, Japanese actress
- 1988 – Glaiza de Castro, Filipino actress and singer
- 1988 – Ashton Eaton, American decathlete
- 1988 – Rolands Freimanis, Latvian basketball player
- 1988 – Vanessa Hessler, Italian-American model and actress
- 1988 – Aleksandar Lazevski, Macedonian footballer
- 1988 – Ángel Mena, Ecuadorian footballer
- 1988 – Valérie Tétreault, Canadian tennis player
- 1988 – Pieter Timmers, Belgian swimmer
- 1988 – Nemanja Tomić, Serbian footballer
- 1989 – Doğuş Balbay, Turkish basketball player
- 1989 – Kayla Banwarth, American indoor volleyball player
- 1989 – Férébory Doré, Congolese footballer
- 1989 – Sergey Fesikov, Russian swimmer
- 1989 – Justin Houston, American football player
- 1989 – Henrikh Mkhitaryan, Armenian footballer
- 1989 – Zhang Shuai, Chinese tennis player
- 1990 – Knowledge Musona, Zimbabwean footballer
- 1990 – Kelly Rohrbach, American model and actress
- 1991 – Ali Al-Busaidi, Omani footballer
- 1991 – Jan Hirt, Czech cyclist
- 1991 – Brayden McNabb, Canadian ice hockey player
- 1991 – Marta Pagnini, Italian gymnast
- 1992 – Sven Erik Bystrøm, Norwegian cyclist
- 1992 – James Duckworth, Australian tennis player
- 1992 – Quinton Howden, Canadian ice hockey player
- 1992 – Kwame Karikari, Ghanaian footballer
- 1992 – Tom Kühnhackl, German ice hockey player
- 1992 – Nicolás Mezquida, Uruguayan footballer
- 1992 – Verónica Cepede Royg, Paraguayan tennis player
- 1992 – Roland Szolnoki, Hungarian footballer
- 1993 – Ronald Blair, former professional American football player
- 1993 – Muralha, Brazilian footballer
- 1994 – Amin Affane, Swedish footballer
- 1994 – Laura Robson, Australian-English tennis player
- 1994 – Booboo Stewart, American actor
- 1995 – Jake Elliott, American football player
- 1995 – Marine Johannès, French basketball player
- 1995 – Alanna Kennedy, Australian soccer player
- 1995 – Nguyễn Công Phượng, Vietnamese footballer
- 1995 – Yuliya Stupak, Russian cross-country skier
- 1996 – Marco Asensio, Spanish footballer
- 1996 – Cristian Pavón, Argentine footballer
- 1997 – Mamadi Diakite, Guinean basketball player
- 1997 – Jeremy Shada, American actor, musician and singer
- 1997 – Ilia Topuria, German-Georgian mixed martial artist
- 1998 – Pervis Estupiñán, Ecuadorian footballer
- 1999 – Rubina Ali, Indian actress
- 1999 – Fūju Kamio, Japanese actor
- 1999 – Alisha Lehmann, Swiss footballer
- 2001 – Baek Jong-bum, South Korean footballer
- 2002 – Moussa Diabaté, French basketball player
- 2002 – Corey Kiner, American football player
- 2003 – Hannibal Mejbri, Tunisian footballer
- 2004 – Princess Ingrid Alexandra of Norway
- 2005 – IShowSpeed, American YouTuber and online streamer
- 2007 – Luke Littler, English darts player

== Deaths ==
=== Pre-1600 ===
- 420 – Yazdegerd I, king of the Sassanid Empire
- 496 – Epiphanius of Pavia, Italian bishop and saint (born 438)
- 917 – Erchanger, Duke of Swabia (born 880)
- 918 – Liu Zhijun, Chinese general
- 939 – Yang Pu, Chinese emperor (born 900)
- 942 – An Chongrong, Chinese general (Five Dynasties)
- 945 – Yang Tan, Chinese general and governor
- 1118 – Pope Paschal II (born 1050)
- 1203 – Agnes II, Abbess of Quedlinburg (born 1139)
- 1320 – Árni Helgason, Icelandic bishop (born c. 1260)
- 1527 – Juan de Grijalva, Spanish explorer (born 1489)
- 1546 – Azai Sukemasa, Japanese daimyō (born 1491)

=== 1601–1900 ===
- 1609 – Joseph Justus Scaliger, French historian and scholar (born 1540)
- 1638 – Ignazio Donati, Italian composer (born 1570)
- 1670 – Claude Duval, French highwayman (born 1643)
- 1683 – Anthony Ashley Cooper, 1st Earl of Shaftesbury, English politician, Chancellor of the Exchequer (born 1621)
- 1699 – Obadiah Walker, English historian and academic (born 1616)
- 1706 – Adrien Baillet, French scholar and critic (born 1649)
- 1710 – Johann Georg Gichtel, German mystic and critic (born 1638)
- 1722 – Charles Paulet, 2nd Duke of Bolton, English politician, Lord Lieutenant of Ireland (born 1661)
- 1731 – Ignjat Đurđević, Croatian poet and translator (born 1675)
- 1773 – Alexis Piron, French playwright and author (born 1689)
- 1774 – Mustafa III, Ottoman sultan (born 1717)
- 1775 – Yemelyan Pugachev, Russian rebel (born 1742)
- 1789 – Baron d'Holbach, French-German philosopher and author (born 1723)
- 1793 – Louis XVI of France (born 1754)
- 1795 – Samuel Wallis, English navigator and explorer (born 1728)
- 1805 – David Ker, Irish-American educator and judge
- 1809 – Josiah Hornblower, American engineer and politician (born 1729)
- 1814 – Jacques-Henri Bernardin de Saint-Pierre, French botanist and author (born 1737)
- 1823 – Cayetano José Rodríguez, Argentinian cleric, journalist, and poet (born 1761)
- 1831 – Ludwig Achim von Arnim, German poet and author (born 1781)
- 1851 – Albert Lortzing, German actor and composer (born 1801)
- 1862 – Božena Němcová, Austrian-Czech author and poet (born 1820)
- 1870 – Alexander Herzen, Russian philosopher and author (born 1812)
- 1872 – Franz Grillparzer, Austrian playwright and poet (born 1791)
- 1881 – Wilhelm Matthias Naeff, Swiss lawyer and politician (born 1802)
- 1891 – Calixa Lavallée, Canadian-American lieutenant and composer (born 1842)

=== 1901–present ===
- 1901 – Elisha Gray, American engineer, co-founded Western Electric (born 1835)
- 1914 – Theodor Kittelsen, Norwegian painter and illustrator (born 1857)
- 1918 – Jan Drozdowski, Polish pianist and music teacher (born 1857)
- 1919 – Gojong of Korea (born 1852)
- 1919 – Ahmed Muhtar Pasha, Ottoman general and politician, 277th Grand Vizier of the Ottoman Empire (born 1839)
- 1924 – Vladimir Lenin, Russian lawyer and politician (born 1870)
- 1926 – Camillo Golgi, Italian physician and pathologist, Nobel Prize laureate (born 1843)
- 1928 – George Washington Goethals, American general and engineer (born 1858)
- 1931 – Felix Blumenfeld, Russian pianist, composer, and conductor (born 1863)
- 1932 – Lytton Strachey, English writer and critic (born 1880)
- 1933 – George Moore, Irish author, poet, and critic (born 1852)
- 1937 – Marie Prevost, Canadian-American actress and singer (born 1896)
- 1938 – Georges Méliès, French actor, director, and producer (born 1861)
- 1945 – Rash Behari Bose, founder of the Indian National Army (born 1886)
- 1948 – Ermanno Wolf-Ferrari, Italian composer and educator (born 1876)
- 1950 – George Orwell, British novelist, essayist, and critic (born 1903)
- 1955 – Archie Hahn, German-American runner and coach (born 1880)
- 1959 – Cecil B. DeMille, American director, producer, and screenwriter (born 1881)
- 1959 – Frances Gertrude McGill, pioneering Canadian forensic pathologist (born 1882)
- 1959 – Carl Switzer, American child actor and hunting guide (born 1927)
- 1961 – Blaise Cendrars, Swiss author and poet (born 1887)
- 1963 – Acharya Shivpujan Sahay, Indian author, poet, and academic (born 1893)
- 1963 – Spiros Xenos, Greek-Swedish painter (born 1881)
- 1967 – Ann Sheridan, American actress (born 1915)
- 1977 – Sandro Penna, Italian poet and journalist (born 1906)
- 1978 – Freda Utley, English scholar and author (born 1898)
- 1983 – Lamar Williams, American bass player (born 1949)
- 1984 – Giannis Skarimpas, Greek playwright and poet (born 1893)
- 1984 – Jackie Wilson, American singer (born 1934)
- 1985 – James Beard, American chef and author (born 1903)
- 1985 – Eddie Graham, American wrestler and promoter (born 1930)
- 1987 – Charles Goodell, American lieutenant, lawyer, and politician (born 1926)
- 1988 – Vincent Lingiari, Australian Aboriginal rights activist (born 1919)
- 1989 – Carl Furillo, American baseball player (born 1922)
- 1989 – Billy Tipton, American pianist and saxophonist (born 1914)
- 1992 – Eddie Mabo, Australian land rights activist (born 1936)
- 1993 – Charlie Gehringer, American baseball player and manager (born 1903)
- 1994 – Bassel al-Assad, Son of the former President of the Syrian Arab Republic Hafez al-Assad (born 1962)
- 1998 – Jack Lord, American actor, director, and producer (born 1920)
- 1999 – Susan Strasberg, American actress (born 1938)
- 2002 – Peggy Lee, American singer (born 1920)
- 2003 – Paul Haines, American-Canadian poet and songwriter (born 1933)
- 2003 – Paul Kuusberg, Estonian journalist and author (born 1916)
- 2004 – Yordan Radichkov, Bulgarian author and playwright (born 1929)
- 2005 – Theun de Vries, Dutch author and poet (born 1907)
- 2005 – John L. Hess, American journalist and critic (born 1917)
- 2005 – Kaljo Raid, Estonian cellist, composer, and pastor (born 1921)
- 2006 – Ibrahim Rugova, Kosovo journalist and politician, 1st President of Kosovo (born 1944)
- 2009 – Krista Kilvet, Estonian journalist, politician and diplomat (born 1946)
- 2010 – Paul Quarrington, Canadian author, playwright, guitarist, and composer (born 1953)
- 2011 – Theoni V. Aldredge, Greek-American costume designer (born 1922)
- 2011 – Dennis Oppenheim, American sculptor and photographer (born 1938)
- 2011 – E. V. V. Satyanarayana, Indian director, producer, and screenwriter (born 1958)
- 2012 – Jonathan Idema, American soldier, mercenary, con artist, vigilante, and criminal (born 1956)
- 2013 – Ahmet Mete Işıkara, Turkish geophysicist and academic (born 1941)
- 2013 – Chumpol Silpa-archa, Thai academic and politician, Deputy Prime Minister of Thailand (born 1940)
- 2013 – Michael Winner, English director, producer, and screenwriter (born 1935)
- 2015 – Marcus Borg, American scholar, theologian, and author (born 1942)
- 2015 – Leon Brittan, English lawyer and politician, Secretary of State for Business, Innovation and Skills (born 1939)
- 2015 – Johnnie Lewis, Liberian lawyer and politician, 18th Chief Justice of Liberia (born 1946)
- 2015 – Canek Sánchez Guevara, Cuban author and dissident (born 1974)
- 2016 – Bill Johnson, American skier (born 1960)
- 2016 – Mrinalini Sarabhai, a 1992-Padma Bhushan award winner Indian classical dancer, choreographer and instructor. (born 1918)
- 2019 – Kaye Ballard, American actress (born 1925)
- 2019 – Henri, Count of Paris, Head of the House of Orléans (born 1933)
- 2019 – Emiliano Sala, Argentine footballer (born 1990)
- 2019 – Harris Wofford, American politician, author and civil rights activist (born 1926)
- 2020 – Terry Jones, Welsh actor, director, and screenwriter (born 1942)
- 2020 – Morgan Wootten, American high school basketball coach (born 1931)
- 2022 – Louie Anderson, American actor and comedian (born 1953)
- 2022 – Leonor Oyarzún, Chilean socialite, First Lady of Chile (born 1919)
- 2025 – Mauricio Funes, Salvadoran politician, 79th President of El Salvador (born 1959)
- 2025 – Garth Hudson, Canadian keyboard player, songwriter, and producer (born 1937)
- 2026 – Virginia Oliver (born 1920), American lobster fisherwoman

== Holidays and observances ==
- Babinden (Bulgaria, Serbia)
- Christian feast day:
  - Agnes
  - Demiana (Coptic Church)
  - Fructuosus
  - John Yi Yun-il (one of The Korean Martyrs)
  - Meinrad of Einsiedeln
  - January 21 (Eastern Orthodox liturgics)
- Errol Barrow Day (Barbados)
- Flag Day (Quebec)
- Grandmother's Day (Poland)
- Lady of Altagracia Day (Dominican Republic)
- Lincoln Alexander Day (Canada)
- National Hugging Day (United States)
- Squirrel Appreciation Day
