= Edna Chaffee Noble =

American elocutionist

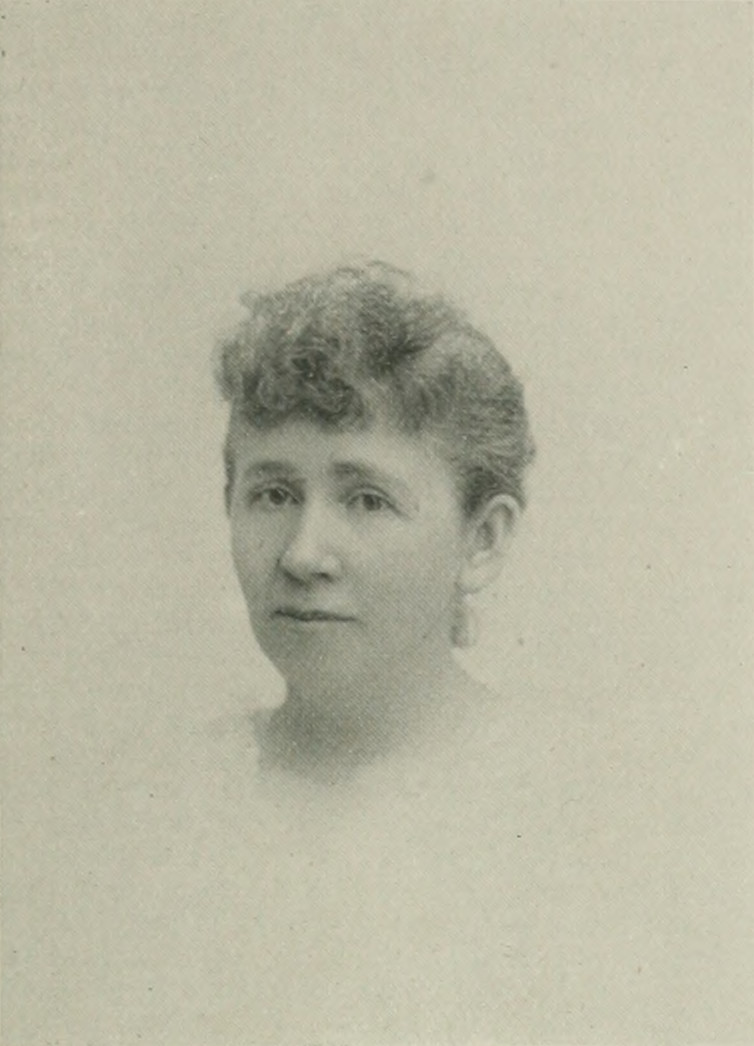
Edna Chaffee Noble

Edna Chaffee Noble (August 12, 1846 – September 20, 1919) was an American elocutionist. She was the founder of the Training School of Elocution and English Literature in Detroit, Michigan, and the Chaffee-Noble School of Expression in London, England. She served as president of the Michigan Association of Elocutionists in 1899.

== Early years ==
Edna Chaffee Noble was born in Rochester, Vermont, August 12, 1846. At the age of fourteen, she went to the Green Mountain Institute, Woodstock, Vermont, where she studied for four years. After a year of study there, she was allowed to teach classes, and she has been connected with schools in one way or another ever since.

== Career ==
She first taught in district schools, where she "boarded around," and later was preceptress of an academy in West Randolph, Vermont, teaching higher English, French and Latin. She was the first woman to teach the village school in her native town, where she surprised the villagers by showing as much ability as her predecessors. When the committee came to hire her and asked her terms, she replied: "The same you have paid the gentleman whose place you wish me to fill, unless there is more work to do, under which circumstances I shall require more pay."

The committee thought they could not give a woman a man's wages, but she remained firm, and at length they engaged her for one term, but kept her two years. Her first study in elocution was with Mr. and Mrs. Joseph Edwin Frobisher, when she was fifteen years old. They gave her careful instruction and developed her extraordinary talent, but forty-eight weeks in a year devoted to teaching left little time for the pursuit of art, and she would never, perhaps, have taken it up again, had it not been for one of those accidents which, though apparently unfortunate, changed the course of her life. After five years of annoyance and suffering from loss of voice, she resolved to study elocution again as a means of cure. For that purpose, she placed herself under the guidance of Prof. Moses True Brown, of Boston, regaining through his instruction both voice and health and making rapid advancement in the art of expression. On Brown's recommendation she was invited to take the chair of oratory in St. Lawrence University, where she taught until her marriage to Dr. Henry S. Noble.

Probably the most important step ever taken by her was the opening of the Training School of Elocution and English Literature in Detroit, Michigan, in 1878. Previous efforts of others in the same direction had ended in failure. Her venture proved to be a fortunate one. In speaking of it, she seemed surprised that people should wonder at the undertaking. She said: "If it is noteworthy to be the first woman to do a thing, why, I suppose I am the first in this particular field of establishing schools of elocution, But I didn't mean to be. I simply did it then, because it was the next thing to be done."

She might have become a rich woman, but for her lavish giving, for she earned a fortune. She once said: "As I have no children, I have tried to show the good God that I knew my place was to look after a few who had no mothers." "Speaking pieces" is but a small part of that which is learned by her pupils. Both art and literature were taught broadly, and, more than that, she exercised a refining and elevating influence over the hundreds of pupils of both sexes who entered her school. She was a mother to every girl who came to her, and was so in a very practical way to many who were bereft of the benefits of a home. Mary A. Livermore, who once visited her school, said to Noble: "The strength of your school lies in the fact that you loved it into life."

Noble was never content with simply doing well. She studied with eminent teachers, in the United States and elsewhere, and used every means for strengthening and perfecting her work. She founded other schools in Grand Rapids, Michigan, Buffalo, New York, Indianapolis, Indiana, and London, England. Thousands heard her as a reader and lecturer. She taught from October to May each year in the Detroit school, and during May and June, visited the Chaffee-Noble School of Expression in London. August, she spent in "Lily Lodge," her summer home in the Adirondacks. She died September 20, 1919, in Detroit, Wayne County, and was buried at Roseland Park Cemetery in Berkley, Michigan.
