= Serhii Minko =

Ukrainian businessman and politician

- Сергій Мінько
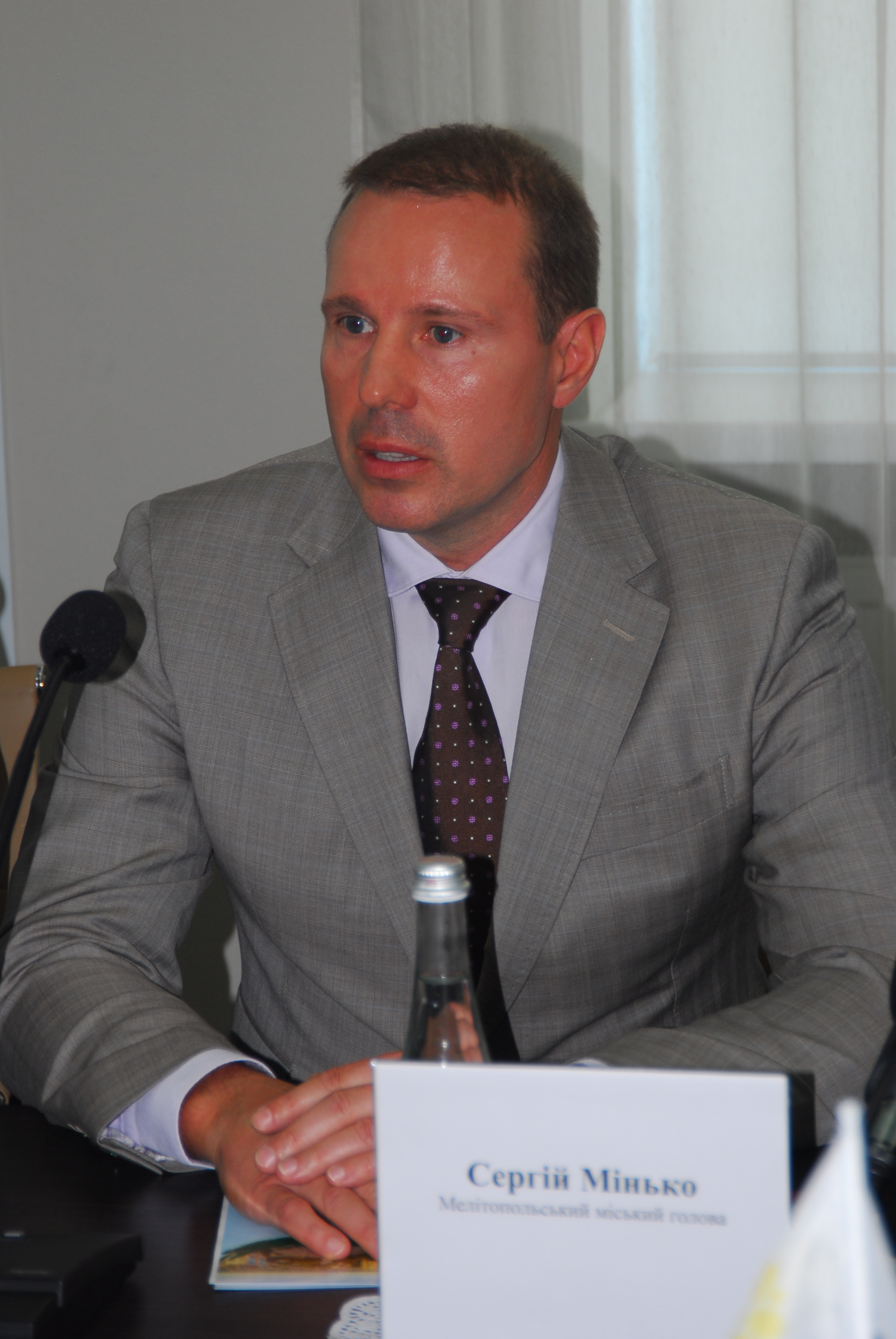
- Minko in 2018

Member of the Verkhovna Rada
- Incumbent
- Assumed office 29 April 2019

Mayor of Melitopol
- In office 15 November 2015 – 12 August 2019
- Preceded by: Serhiy Valter
- Succeeded by: Ivan Fedorov

Personal details
- Born: Serhiy Anatoliyovych Minko; 30 September 1973 (age 52) Pavlodar, Kazakhstan, Soviet Union
- Party: For the Future
- Other political affiliations: Petro Poroshenko Bloc; Party of Regions (until March 2015)

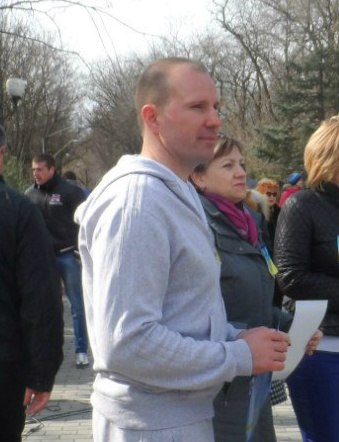
Minko in April 2014

Serhiy Anatoliyovych Minko (born September 20, 1973, Pavlodar, Kazakh SSR, USSR) is a Ukrainian politician, businessman, public figure and philanthropist who served as Mayor of Melitopol from 2015 to 2019. He previously served as Secretary of the Melitopol City Council and Acting Mayor in 2014–2015. People's Deputy of Ukraine of the IX convocation.

== Biography ==
He was born on September 20, 1973, in Pavlodar of the Kazakh SSR.

On February 28, 2014, he was elected Secretary of the Melitopol City Council. 48 out of 50 deputies voted in favor of the decision. As the then mayor, Serhiy Walter, was under investigation and suspended from office, Serhiy Minko became the acting mayor of Melitopol simultaneously with his election as the city council secretary. The next day after his election, he left the Party of Regions with a statement that as the secretary of the city council he could not be involved in the processes taking place within the party.

On April 24, 2014, the deputies of Melitopol City Council awarded the 7th rank of local government official to the Secretary of the City Council Serhiy Minko.

In October 2014, in the early elections to the Verkhovna Rada, he ran in the single-mandate constituency No. 80 from the party "Petro Poroshenko's Bloc "Solidarity", but lost to Yevhen Balytskyi, taking second place with 19.56% of the vote.

=== Mayor of Melitopol ===
On October 1, 2015, he was registered as a candidate for mayor of Melitopol from the Bloc of Petro Poroshenko party "Solidarity". He won the first and second rounds of local elections.

On November 20, 2015, he took the mayor's oath and began to perform his duties.

=== People's Deputy ===
In the early 2019 Ukrainian parliamentary election, Minko nominated his own candidate in the constituency № 80 (the city of Melitopol and the Melitopol district). He won with 39.13% of voter support. In parliament he joined the deputy group "For the Future".

He is the secretary of the Verkhovna Rada Committee on Law Enforcement.
