= Rochester (CDP), Vermont =

Census-designated place in Vermont, United States

Rochester, Vermont
- Census-designated place
- Location in Windsor County and the state of Vermont
- Coordinates: 43°52′36″N 72°48′18″W
- Country: United States
- State: Vermont
- County: Windsor

Area
  - Total: 0.64 sq mi (1.67 km^{2})
  - Land: 0.63 sq mi (1.64 km^{2})
  - Water: 0.012 sq mi (0.03 km^{2})
- Elevation: 892 ft (272 m)

Population (2010)
  - Total: 299
  - Density: 472/sq mi (182/km^{2})
- Time zone: UTC-5 (Eastern (EST))
  - Summer (DST): UTC-4 (EDT)
- ZIP code: 05767
- Area code: 802
- FIPS code: 50-60025
- GNIS feature ID: 2586652

Rochester is a census-designated place (CDP) that comprises the central village of the town of Rochester, Windsor County, Vermont, United States. As of the 2010 census, the population of the CDP was 299, compared to 1,139 for the entire town of Rochester.

== Geography ==
Rochester is located in extreme northwest Windsor County, along the White River. Vermont Route 100 passes through the village, heading north to Hancock, Granville, and Warren, and south to Stockbridge. Vermont Route 73 leads west from Rochester, crossing the Green Mountains to Brandon.
