= Barbara Fiske Calhoun =

American cartoonist (1919–2014)

- Born: Isabelle Daniel Hall; September 9, 1919; Tucson, Arizona
- Died: April 28, 2014 (aged 94); Brookside Nursing Home, White River Junction, Vermont
- Other names: Barbara Hall; B. Hall
- Occupations: comic book artist, painter
- Notable work: Girl Commandos; Quarry Hill Creative Center
- Spouse(s): Irving Fiske (m. 1946 – div. 1976); Donald Calhoun (m. 1989–2009)
- Children: Isabella Fiske (b. 1950); William Fiske (1954–2008)
- Parent(s): John Hall, Jr. and Isabelle Daniel Jones

Barbara Fiske Calhoun (born Isabelle Daniel Hall; September 9, 1919 – April 28, 2014) was an American cartoonist and painter, one of the few female creators from the Golden Age of Comic Books. She co-founded Quarry Hill Creative Center, one of Vermont's oldest alternative communities, on the Fiske family property, in Rochester, Vermont.

== Early life and education ==
Isabelle Daniel Hall was born in Tucson, Arizona, on September 9, 1919, to Isabelle Daniel Jones and John Hall Jr., both newspaper reporters. Both were scions of upper-class Southern families who uprooted after the Civil War and traveled West. Barbara's mother Isabelle, called "Belle," came from Asheville, North Carolina, where she had modeled for the papers with her sisters Mary and Polly. Around 1912, she and her brother A. V., who had tuberculosis, came to Tucson seeking the warmth of the desert and hoping it would cure or remit his illness.

John Hall Jr., was from Alabama, though he had been born in Jacksonville, Florida. His mother, Lucy Herter Hall—a Yankee from Boston who also had tuberculosis. After her husband, John Hall Sr., died, Lucy came to Arizona with her three sons, John, Richard and Harry. John Hall and Belle met in Arizona during this time.

A.V. died in 1915, and no longer needing to care for her brother, Belle finally felt able to marry John, a few years younger than herself. Belle and John married on March 20, 1918, and "Babs," from the Scots word for "baby," was born in September the following year. Her father was caught up in a late wave of Spanish Influenza and died in February 1920, when Babs was only six months old.

Babs attended art school in Los Angeles, moving to New York in 1940.

== Harvey Comics ==
During World War II, after showing her portfolio to Harvey Comics in 1941, Babs was hired to draw the comic feature Black Cat. She was one of the few female comic book artists in the United States during the World War II era. Living in the West Village, she met her husband-to-be, writer and playwright Irving Fiske, who suggested that she change her name to "Barbara Hall," which she did. She signed her work "B. Hall" because female cartoonists were not held in high esteem.

Her next strip was Girl Commandos, about an international team of Nazi-fighting women. This feature focused on Pat Parker, war nurse, a "freelance fighter for freedom." While stationed in India, Parker recruits a British nurse, an American radio operator, a Soviet photographer, and a Chinese patriot. Hall continued Girl Commandos until 1943, when it was taken over by Jill Elgin.

Hall also created the Blonde Bomber (aka Honey Blake), a newsreel camerawoman, chemist, and crime-fighter with a sidekick named Jimmy Slapso. The Blonde Bomber was a regular feature of Harvey's Green Hornet comics.

== Quarry Hill Creative Center ==
On January 8, 1946, she married Irving Fiske and began to use the name Barbara Hall Fiske. On April 10, 1946, she and her husband, both extremely unconventional bohemian intellectuals, used wedding money to buy the farm in Rochester that later became the artist's retreat and "hippie commune" called Quarry Hill Creative Center. (The Fiske family do not consider Quarry Hill to be a commune. Homeowners sign an agreement with Lyman Hall Inc., the current owner of the land, that it belongs to the Fiske family and the corporation, And they pay a site fee. The corporation provides plowing, water and Trash removal, among other things.

Barbara and Irving had two children: Isabella "Ladybelle" Joachim Fiske (born 1950) and William John Fiske (1954–2008). Though she had given up drawing comics, to the loss of the world of cartooning, she continued and developed the sophistication of her artwork in the mediums of egg tempera and pastel. In the mid-1960s, Barbara opened a storefront, The Gallery Gwen, in New York's East Village. There Barbara showed her paintings, along with those of others, and Irving began to give public talks on Tantra, Zen, Sufism, Hinduism, Christianity, Judaism, and atheism, among many other things. Hundreds of young people, including many who became well-known, such as Art Spiegelman (who dated the Fiskes’ daughter Isabella) and Stephen Huneck, began to visit Quarry Hill Creative Center. Many stayed to build houses; Quarry Hill is now the oldest and largest alternative lifestyle group in Vermont, and one of the largest in New England.

She attended Vermont College and got an MFA in Art History during the 60s, and returned to Quarry Hill after a time of living in Randolph, Vermont. She divorced Fiske in 1976. After a period of some tension, they reached a state of friendliness and mutual support, with the shared desire to see Quarry Hill continue. With the assistance of her son, William, and others, Barbara created a corporation to own the land, Lyman Hall, Inc.

In 1989, she married Dr. Donald Calhoun, a Quaker writer and sociology professor who had been her mentor at Vermont College. Barbara also became a member of the Society of Friends (Quakers) in Middlebury, VT during the 1980s. They both lived at Quarry Hill into their 90s. Donald Calhoun died on May 5, 2009.

Barbara lived at Quarry Hill Creative Center till she was 93, teaching art and encouraging the young.

== Illness and death ==
Ill health and disability led her to enter Brookside Nursing Home in White River Junction, Vermont, where she died April 28, 2014. Her daughter and son-in-law, Brion T. McFarlin, were with her in the last days before her death. Following the custom of Quarry Hill, they read to her from favorite poets and philosophers, including passages from The Tibetan Book of the Dead, and played her favorite music. Barbara Hall Fiske Calhoun's centenary will be celebrated in summer 2019 at Quarry Hill.
