= Irving Fiske =

American playwright, writer, and public speaker (1908–1990)

- Born: Irving Louis Fishman; March 5, 1908; Brooklyn, New York, U.S.
- Died: April 25, 1990 (aged 82); Monroe Regional Medical Center; Ocala, Florida
- Other names: "The Forest Wizard" "The Socrates of Ocala Forest"
- Education: Cornell University, 1928
- Occupations: playwright, writer, and public speaker
- Known for: Quarry Hill Creative Center
- Spouse: Barbara Fiske Calhoun (m. 1946 – div. 1976)
- Children: Isabella Fiske (b. 1950); William Fiske (1954-2008)
- Family: (brothers): Milton and Robert (sister) Miriam

Irving L. Fiske (born Irving Louis Fishman; March 5, 1908 – April 25, 1990) was an American playwright, writer, and public speaker. He worked for the Federal Writers' Project of the Works Progress Administration (WPA) in the 1930s, where he was a writer and rewrite man on The WPA Guide to New York City, in print today. He corresponded with George Bernard Shaw, wrote an article now considered a classic, "Bernard Shaw's Debt to William Blake," and translated Shakespeare's Hamlet into Modern English. He and his wife Barbara Fiske Calhoun co-founded the artist's retreat and intentional community Quarry Hill Creative Center, on the Fiske family property, in Rochester, Vermont.

== Biography ==
Fiske was born in Brooklyn, New York, to an immigrant Jewish family from Georgia, Moldavia, and Romania. He graduated from Cornell University in 1928. He had two brothers, Milton and Robert, and a sister, Miriam. Milton was a Bohemian, like Irving, and a classical composer, like his hero, Wolfgang Amadeus Mozart, with whom he shared a birthday.

Fiske wrote for H. L. Mencken's American Mercury.

On January 8, 1946, Fiske married artist and cartoonist Barbara Hall, later Barbara Fiske Calhoun. In 1946, he and his wife, both profoundly unconventional bohemian intellectuals, used wedding money to buy the Loren Spencer hill farm in Rochester that later became Quarry Hill Creative Center, in Rochester, Vermont.

Fiske joined Allen Ginsberg and Peter Orlovsky in a First Amendment-based defense of the Beat Generation coffee houses along Second Avenue in the East Village in 1964. Some business owners objected to the use of "obscenity" in the Beat poetry being read by poets like Ginsberg and many others. Ginsberg, Orlovsky, Fiske, and others won the case. The right of poets to use any language they choose is considered a part of their art, as well as a constitutional right.

In the mid-1960s, Barbara opened a storefront, The Gallery Gwen, in New York's East Village. There, Barbara showed her paintings, along with those of others, and Irving began to give public talks on Tantra, Zen, Sufism, Hinduism, Christianity, Judaism, and atheism, among many other things. Irving became well known around the Village, and was soon speaking to standing-room-only audiences. Many associated him with R. Crumb's character Mr. Natural. Irving spoke out in favor of people finding their own creative path in life, enjoying themselves, being free of guilt and shame, and children's rights. He wrote letters for young men who were conscientious objectors to the Vietnam War. Irving was known in the Village as "The Forest Wizard," (someone had given him a card on the street one day and he made it a part of his persona); and in Florida, where he had a cabin on a lake, he was known as "The Socrates of the Ocala National Forest." Fiske also spoke at colleges and churches on the East Coast, such as Goddard College in Plainfield, Vermont.

Hundreds of young people, including many who became well-known, such as Art Spiegelman (who dated, and lived with, Fiske's daughter Isabella) and Stephen Huneck, began to visit Quarry Hill Creative Center. Many stayed to build houses; Quarry Hill is now the oldest and largest alternative lifestyle group in Vermont, and one of the largest in New England.

A controversial figure, in the 1970s, when his cabin in the Ocala Forest was burnt by arsonists, and the authorities did not give him a permit to rebuild, he launched a legal and media battle, claiming that the authorities were prejudiced against the young people he brought there as his friends, most of whom had long hair. He eventually got the permit and rebuilt the cabin.

Fiske and his wife divorced in 1976. After a period of some tension, he and Barbara reached a state of friendliness and mutual support, with the shared desire to see Quarry Hill continue. With the assistance of her son, William, and others, Barbara created a corporation to own the land.

Fiske — who went on with all the activities that entertained him and promoted a more sane future for humanity—became well known in the counterculture both in the United States and elsewhere. He died of a stroke in Ocala, Florida, on April 25, 1990. Irving Fiske's centennial was celebrated in Vermont and in Florida in 2008.

=== Hamlet in Modern English ===
Fiske's translation of Hamlet into modern English was never published, but was performed in public several times, once at Rollins College in Winter Park, Florida.

In 1947, Fiske filed a lawsuit against Cary Grant and Alfred Hitchcock for infringing upon Hamlet in Modern English. In 1945, Hitchcock had announced plans to make a modern-language version of Hamlet. Although the project was dropped, Fiske claimed Hitchcock and Grant had plagiarized Fiske's concept, and sought damages of $1.25 million (later reduced to $750,000).

The case was eventually heard in October 1954 by New York Federal Court Judge William Bondy. After 11 days of testimony, Judge Bondy halted the trial and directed the jury to find the case "not proven." Fiske was later ordered to pay $5,000 towards Hitchcock's legal costs.

Fiske's translation of Hamlet was considered controversial. In the 1960s, John Ciardi, who did not approve of the translation, reprinted excerpts in the Saturday Review. Most Saturday Review readers wrote in favor of the translation; as did such notable figures as William Saroyan, Orson Welles, Henry Miller, Upton Sinclair, Aldous Huxley, and George Bernard Shaw.

== Bibliography ==
- "Pecos Bill, Cyclone Buster," American Mercury (Dec. 1939), pp. 403–407.
- "Where Does Television Belong?" Harper's Magazine (February 1940).
- "Bernard Shaw's Debt to William Blake." [19-page pamphlet] (London: The Shaw Society, 1951). Reprinted in G. B. Shaw: A Collection of Critical Essays, ed. R. J. Kaufmann (Englewood Cliffs,. N.J.: Prentice-Hall, 1965).
- "Letters to the Editor: Not a 'Hippy'," Ocala Star-Banner (May 25, 1971).
- (with Allen Sherman -not the song writer) Brighter than the Sun (1987) [play] — produced in Vermont
