= Serhiy Valter =

- Сергій Вальтер
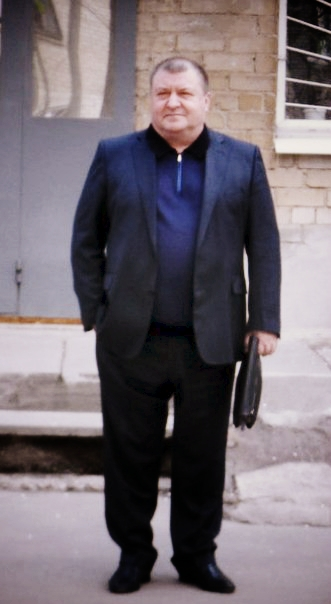
- Valter in April 2014

Mayor of Melitopol
- In office 20 August 2010 – 9 November 2010
- Succeeded by: Serhii Minko

Mayor of Melitopol (acting)
- In office 12 November 2010 – 28 February 2014
- Preceded by: Dmytro Synchov

Personal details
- Born: Serhiy Heorhiyovych Valter; 21 January 1958 Melitopol, Ukrainian SSR, Soviet Union
- Died: 25 February 2015 (aged 57) Melitopol, Ukraine
- Party: Party of Regions

Serhiy Heorhiyovych Valter (Ukrainian: Сергій Георгійович Вальтер, also known as Serhij Valter; January 21, 1958 — February 25, 2015) was a Ukrainian politician. He was the Secretary of the City Council of Melitopol, Ukraine (2002–2010) and Mayor of Melitopol (2010–2015).

== Biography ==
Valter was born in 1958 in Melitopol, Zaporizhzhia Oblast, Ukrainian SSR. In 1975, he graduated from Melitopol high school number 11. From 1976–1980, he worked as a driver in the Melitopol enterprise "Agriculture", and in 1980–1981 he worked at Melitopol station and served in the military. From 1976–1979 Valter served two sentences in Berdyansk prison for embezzlement of state property.

On February 8, 2013, the decision of the court regarding Serhiy Valter was dismissed by the mayor.

On February 25, 2015, Valter was found hanged at his home; he was to have appeared in court later that day on charges of corruption and criminal association.

His death was investigated as murder, but forensic experts were inclined towards a verdict of suicide. According to the press centre in the ATC Zaporizhia region, information on the case was brought in for Erdre ch. 1, Art. 115 of the Criminal Code of Ukraine (Murder).

Denis Korhogo Derzhobvynuvach stated that in light of the conclusions as to the cause of death, Serhiy Valter's case is closed.

A civil memorial service for Valter was held at the house of culture in Melitopol on February 27.
