= Squirrel Appreciation Day =

Annual event

- Official name: Squirrel Appreciation Day
- Observed by: United States
- Type: Secular
- Celebrations: Appreciate Squirrels
- Date: January 21
- Next time: 21 January 2027
- Frequency: Annual

Squirrel Appreciation Day is an annual American event devoted to the over 200 species of squirrels. It occurs annually on January 21. It was designed as a fun way to appreciate squirrels' natural characteristics and recognize their contribution to nature and ecology; specifically squirrels' contribution to reforestation.

== History ==
The first annual National Squirrel Appreciation Day was celebrated on January 21, 2002. It was created by Christy Hargrove, a wildlife rehabilitator, in Asheville, North Carolina. Squirrel Appreciation Day was recognized in Chase's Calendar of Events.
