= Rochester, Vermont =

Town in Vermont

- Town
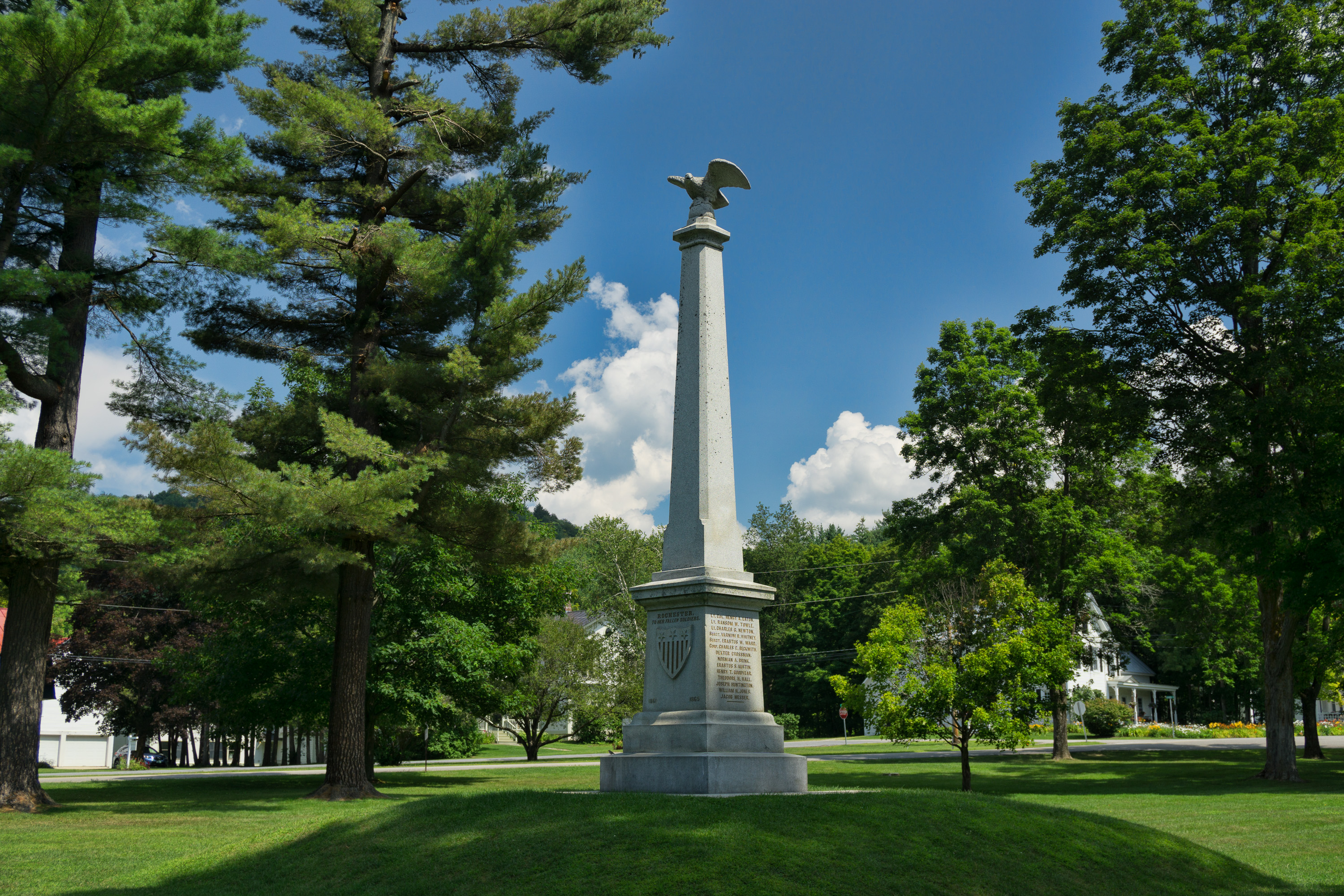
- Civil War memorial in The Park in the center of town

- Seal
- Motto: The heart of the Green Mountains
- Location in Windsor County and the state of Vermont
- Coordinates: 43°52′34″N 72°48′44″W
- Country: United States
- State: Vermont
- County: Windsor
- Chartered: 1781; 245 years ago
- Communities: Rochester; Emerson; Jerusalem; Talcville; Tupper

Area
  - Total: 57.4 sq mi (148.6 km^{2})
  - Land: 57.1 sq mi (147.8 km^{2})
  - Water: 0.31 sq mi (0.8 km^{2})
- Elevation: 1,978 ft (603 m)

Population (2020)
  - Total: 1,099
  - Density: 19.26/sq mi (7.436/km^{2})
- Time zone: UTC-5 (EST)
  - Summer (DST): UTC-4 (EDT)
- ZIP code: 05767
- Area code: 802
- FIPS code: 50-60100
- GNIS feature ID: 1462188
- Website: rochestervermont.org

Rochester is a town in Windsor County, Vermont, United States. The population was 1,099 at the 2020 census. The central village is delineated as the Rochester census-designated place.

== History ==
Rochester was granted in 1780, chartered in 1781 to Dudley Chase, Asa Whitcomb and 63 others, then organized in 1788. It was first settled in the winter of 1781–1782 by David Currier and his family. Rochester's boundaries expanded through annexation of part of Pittsfield town in 1806, annexation of an additional area from Pittsfield town plus a part of Braintree town in 1824, a part of Hancock town in 1834, and finally an annexation of part of Goshen town in 1847.

The surface of the town is mountainous and broken, but the intervales along the White River provided good farmland. There were sites supplying water power for mills. By 1859, when the population was 1,493, industries included one gristmill, several sawmills, one tub factory, and a variety of mechanic shops. The White River Railroad from Bethel opened to Rochester in 1900, but was abandoned in 1933 during the Great Depression.

Rochester was one of thirteen Vermont towns isolated by flooding caused by Hurricane Irene in 2011.

In 2018, Rochester High School and Middle School closed due to Act 46. The school had been in Rochester since 1886 and the current building had been used since 1974.

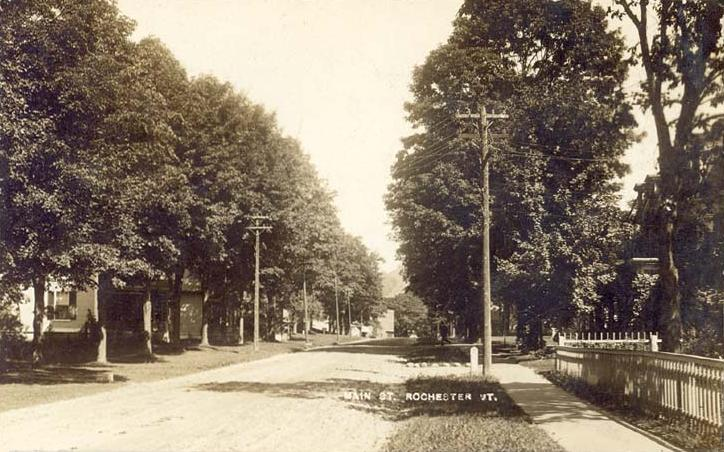
Main Street in 1912

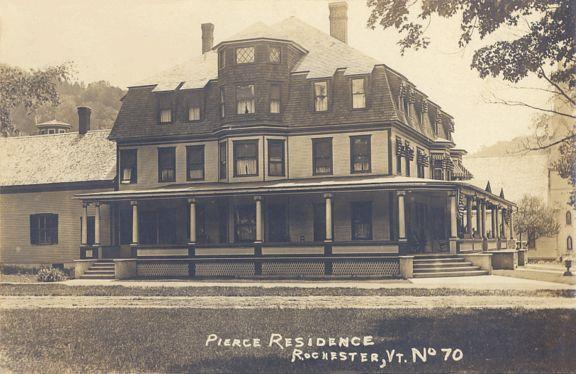
Pierce residence c. 1915

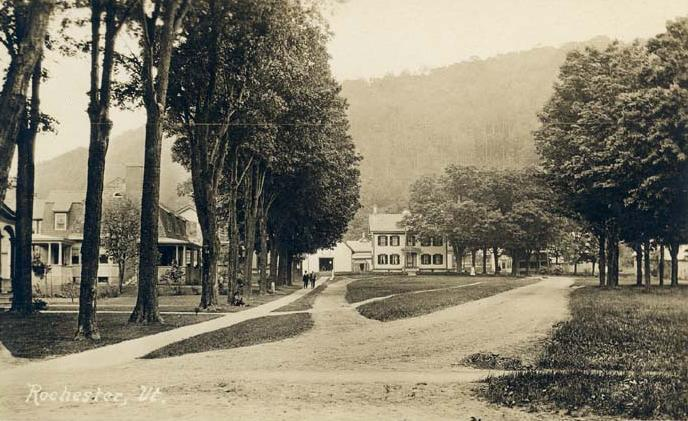
Street scene c. 1915

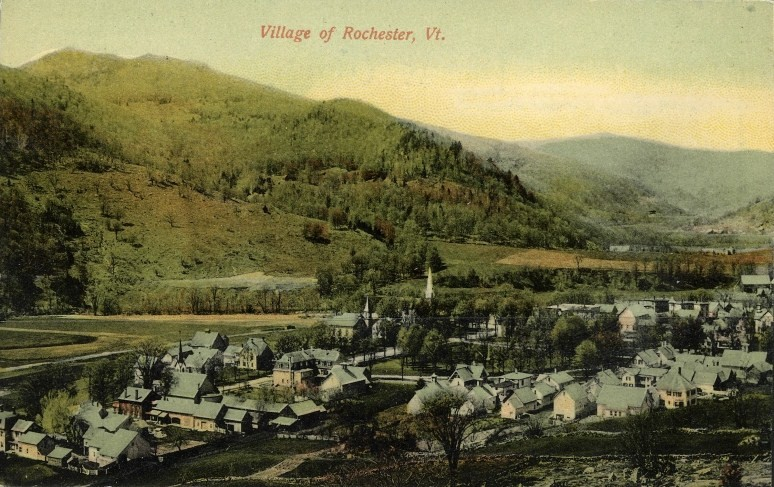
The village, early 1900s

== Geography ==
According to the United States Census Bureau, the town has a total area of 57.4 square miles (148.6 km^{2}), of which 57.1 square miles (147.8 km^{2}) is land and 0.31 square miles (0.8 km^{2}), or 0.53%, is water. Rochester is drained by the White River.

The town is crossed by Vermont Route 73 and Vermont Route 100.

=== Climate ===
Rochester has a humid continental climate (Köppen Dfb).

Climate data for Rochester, Vermont (1991–2020 normals, extremes 1964–2020)
Month	Jan	Feb	Mar	Apr	May	Jun	Jul	Aug	Sep	Oct	Nov	Dec	Year
Record high °F (°C)	64 (18)	70 (21)	82 (28)	91 (33)	92 (33)	95 (35)	95 (35)	98 (37)	95 (35)	84 (29)	75 (24)	68 (20)	98 (37)
Mean daily maximum °F (°C)	29.2 (−1.6)	32.1 (0.1)	40.6 (4.8)	54.1 (12.3)	67.3 (19.6)	75.1 (23.9)	79.4 (26.3)	78.3 (25.7)	71.7 (22.1)	58.5 (14.7)	46.4 (8.0)	34.5 (1.4)	55.6 (13.1)
Daily mean °F (°C)	18.9 (−7.3)	20.5 (−6.4)	29.0 (−1.7)	41.9 (5.5)	53.9 (12.2)	62.5 (16.9)	67.2 (19.6)	66.0 (18.9)	59.1 (15.1)	47.1 (8.4)	36.6 (2.6)	25.5 (−3.6)	44.0 (6.7)
Mean daily minimum °F (°C)	8.7 (−12.9)	8.8 (−12.9)	17.3 (−8.2)	29.7 (−1.3)	40.5 (4.7)	49.8 (9.9)	55.0 (12.8)	53.8 (12.1)	46.6 (8.1)	35.8 (2.1)	26.8 (−2.9)	16.4 (−8.7)	32.4 (0.2)
Record low °F (°C)	−32 (−36)	−28 (−33)	−21 (−29)	1 (−17)	21 (−6)	30 (−1)	35 (2)	33 (1)	23 (−5)	9 (−13)	−2 (−19)	−30 (−34)	−32 (−36)
Average precipitation inches (mm)	3.49 (89)	2.82 (72)	3.38 (86)	3.81 (97)	3.85 (98)	5.24 (133)	5.09 (129)	4.45 (113)	3.93 (100)	4.96 (126)	3.73 (95)	4.12 (105)	48.87 (1,241)
Average snowfall inches (cm)	18.4 (47)	17.4 (44)	15.5 (39)	3.6 (9.1)	0.0 (0.0)	0.0 (0.0)	0.0 (0.0)	0.0 (0.0)	0.0 (0.0)	0.5 (1.3)	2.8 (7.1)	17.3 (44)	75.5 (192)
Average precipitation days (≥ 0.01 in)	8.7	8.1	8.5	10.7	13.1	14.3	12.9	11.0	10.0	12.9	9.4	10.5	130.1
Average snowy days (≥ 0.1 in)	7.0	6.5	4.9	1.2	0.0	0.0	0.0	0.0	0.0	0.4	1.7	7.0	28.7
Source: NOAA

== Demographics ==
Historical population
Census	Pop.	Note	%±
1790	215		—
1800	524		143.7%
1810	911		73.9%
1820	1,148		26.0%
1830	1,392		21.3%
1840	1,396		0.3%
1850	1,493		6.9%
1860	1,507		0.9%
1870	1,444		−4.2%
1880	1,362		−5.7%
1890	1,257		−7.7%
1900	1,250		−0.6%
1910	1,317		5.4%
1920	1,397		6.1%
1930	1,285		−8.0%
1940	1,129		−12.1%
1950	937		−17.0%
1960	879		−6.2%
1970	884		0.6%
1980	1,054		19.2%
1990	1,181		12.0%
2000	1,171		−0.8%
2010	1,139		−2.7%
2020	1,099		−3.5%
U.S. Decennial Census

As of the census of 2000, there were 1,171 people, 511 households, and 330 families residing in the town. The population density was 20.8 people per square mile (8.0/km^{2}). There were 768 housing units at an average density of 13.7 per square mile (5.3/km^{2}). The racial makeup of the town was 98.46% White, 0.17% African American, 0.17% Asian, and 1.20% from two or more races. Hispanic or Latino of any race were 1.20% of the population. There were 511 households, out of which 28.2% had children under the age of 18 living with them, 52.4% were couples living together and joined in either marriage or civil union, 8.8% had a female householder with no husband present, and 35.4% were non-families. 28.6% of all households were made up of individuals, and 11.2% had someone living alone who was 65 years of age or older. The average household size was 2.26 and the average family size was 2.76.

In the town, the population was spread out, with 22.1% under the age of 18, 5.0% from 18 to 24, 26.3% from 25 to 44, 28.8% from 45 to 64, and 17.8% who were 65 years of age or older. The median age was 43 years. For every 100 females, there were 93.2 males. For every 100 females age 18 and over, there were 96.6 males.

The median income for a household in the town was $35,820, and the median income for a family was $41,131. Males had a median income of $30,395 versus $21,964 for females. The per capita income for the town was $19,986. About 4.2% of families and 6.0% of the population were below the poverty line, including 8.5% of those under age 18 and 1.0% of those age 65 or over.

== Site of interest ==
- Green Mountain National Forest

== Notable people ==
- Barbara Fiske Calhoun, World War II cartoonist and artist
- William Wildman Campbell, US congressman from Ohio
- Irving Fiske, playwright and co-founder of Quarry Hill Creative Center in Rochester
- Robert H. Gardner, Academy Award nominated filmmaker
- Stephen Huneck, folk artist
- Jeremiah Ingalls, early American composer
- William B. Martin, Iowa Secretary of State
- Edna Chaffee Noble, elocutionist
- Steve Reich, American composer
- James Whitcomb, US senator and the eighth governor of Indiana
- Tom Wicker, US journalist
