= Sally Haley =

American artist (1908–2007)

- Sally Haley, 1986, photograph by Marian Wood Kolisch
- Born: June 29, 1908; Bridgeport, Connecticut
- Died: September 1, 2007 (aged 99); Portland, Oregon
- Known for: Painting, Printmaking
- Spouse: Michele Russo

Sally Haley (June 29, 1908 – September 1, 2007) was an American painter. Her career spanned much of the 20th century and she is credited for helping to expand the emerging art scene in Portland, Oregon, during the middle of the century. Much of her work was an application of egg tempera, a technique which leaves a flat, brushless surface. She preferred domestic subjects and interior spaces with hints of the indoor or outdoor space that lay beyond. Her signature style is a blend of minimalist interior space with highly detailed still-life objects within.

Sally Haley was born in Bridgeport, Connecticut. She attended the Yale School of Art at Yale University and graduated in 1931. After graduation she worked as an art teacher, teaching mechanical drawing at Harding High School. In 1933 she used the money she had saved teaching to travel in Europe, where she studied painting in Germany, but she felt uncomfortable there and decided to go paint and study in Paris. When she got back to the US she met her husband Michele (Mike) Russo who was also a painter who had just graduated with a BFA from the Yale School of Art. They lived on the East Coast, taking various odd jobs during the war as painters. Some of these jobs were part of the WPA Federal Art Project. Haley was one of the muralists involved in painting post office murals as part of the Federal Art Project. She completed the twelve-foot-long mural, Mail-The Connecting Link, in McConnelsville, Ohio, in 1938. While her largest work, depicting the outdoors was not her favored subject matter. Haley also gave birth to her first son (Michael) during this time. After the war, the family moved across the country to Portland in 1947 when her husband Mike was offered a position teaching art at the Museum Art School within the Portland Art Museum. They lived briefly in Vanport when they first moved to Portland, but their home and belongings were destroyed in the Vanport flood of 1948. They then moved to a neighborhood in east Portland where they resided for several decades. Sometime in the 1970's they relocated to a Victorian home in Northwest Portland. Haley gave birth to her second son Gian while she was in her 40s. While Haley never returned to work, she never stopped painting, and was able to create a full career while being a homemaker by choosing to set up a studio in their home. A lot of Haley's work includes still life's of food, and she was known to be an avid home cook. She would frequently state in interviews how much she enjoyed cooking, gardening, and being in her home. These passions can often be seen in the subjects she chose to paint. Haley and Russo were a fiery, passionate couple, within a dedicated subculture of artists during Portland's mid-20th century. That group helped create a small but dynamic art scene. Like Haley and Russo, those artists, including Carl and Hilda Morris, Louis Bunce and William Givler, who came from or often traveled to the East Coast, putting a vivid stamp on the intellectual climate of a seemingly provincial art scene geographically cut off from the art world's major centers. Haley and Russo also worked closely with Arlene Schnitzer, especially early on when she opened the Fountain Gallery in 1961.

Haley and her husband were part of a group of artists who helped to create a small art scene in Portland, which are now a part of the city's landscape. Haley herself was widely known and praised by art critics for her portraits and still life paintings. She was well trained in the classical techniques of painting like the old masters (as taught to her by Daniel V. Thompson at Yale), but she would also experiment with surrealism and minimalism, especially in the 1950s and 60s. She held many solo and group exhibitions throughout her long career, and was frequently mentioned and reviewed in local newspapers. She has been honored twice with retrospectives, one at the Portland Art Museum in 1975, which holds her work in their collection, and another at Marylhurst College in 1993. Haley received the prestigious Oregon Governor's Award for the Arts, in 1989. Her work is also part of many public and private collections, including the Tacoma Art Museum, Washington; The Hallie Ford Museum of Art at Willamette University, Salem, Oregon; the American Telephone and Telegraph Company of New York, the Federal Reserve Bank of San Francisco, California; and Kaiser Foundation and Portland Civic Auditorium in Oregon.

Haley and Russo's legacy had been carefully attended to over the years by their niece Laura Russo, who opened the Laura Russo Gallery in Portland in 1986. The gallery would house much of their works, showing and selling them regularly. The gallery is now owned and operated by Martha Lee, who still regularly shows their work to this day.

Mike Russo died in 2004, and Sally Haley died 3 years later at an assisted living facility in Portland, Oregon, on September 1, 2007, at age 99.
