= Geraldine Branch =

American obstetrician-gynecologist

- Born: Geraldine Burton; October 20, 1908
- Died: July 22, 2016 (aged 107)
- Education: Hunter College; New York Medical College; University of California, Los Angeles
- Spouse: Robert Henry Branch (m. 1936)
- Children: 2

Geraldine Burton Branch née Burton; October 20, 1908 – July 22, 2016) was an American obstetrician-gynecologist who practiced in New York City and Los Angeles, California.

She earned a double major in chemistry and physics and a double minor in biology and pedagogy from Hunter College in 1932 and her M.D. from New York Medical College in 1936. In 1962, she received a master's degree in public health from the University of California, Los Angeles.

== Works and achievements ==
Branch wrote several works regarding various health conditions such as "Study of Gonorrhea in Infants & Children" and "Study of Use of Neighborhood Aides in Control of a Diphtheria Outbreak"
