= Spiros Xenos =

Greek-Swedish artist

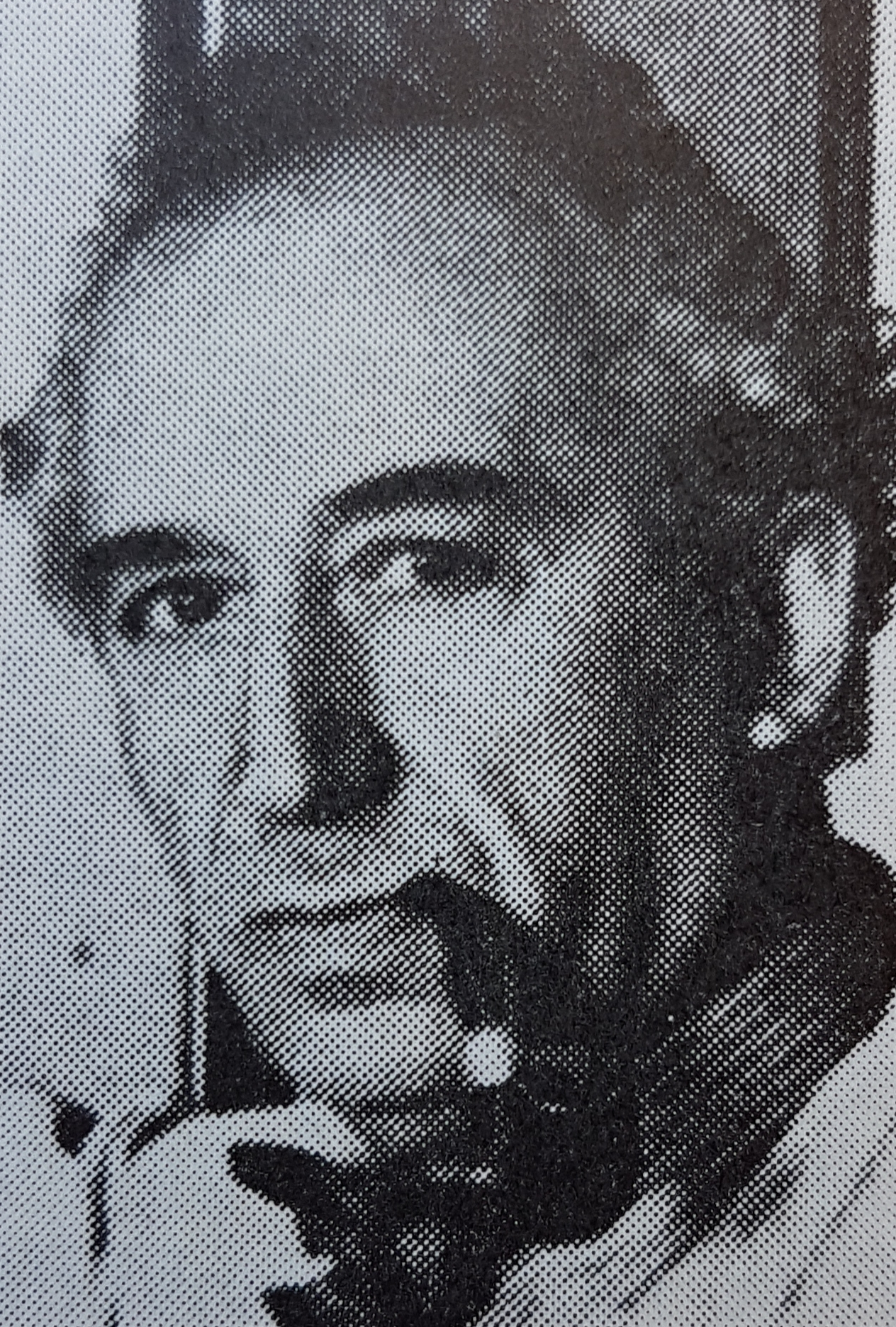
Spiros George Xenos

Spiros George Xenos (11 June 1881 – 21 January 1963) was a Greek-Swedish artist.

Xenos was born in Athens, Greece. After six years of study at Athens School of Fine Arts, he left Greece in 1903 and helped by a scholarship continued his education in Munich, Germany.

In Paris he opened a studio and established himself in artist circles. Here he also met his first wife, Gothenburg-born Elin von Reis (1874-1926) whom he married 1911. In 1913, the couple went to Sweden for a short stay, but due to the outbreak of World War came to settle there.

Xenos's paintings were inspired by the landscape of Sweden's west coast, but he is also known for his portraits and still lifes. The book "Partille Krönika" (Partille Chronicle) by Erik Bergendahl, published in 1920 and reprinted in 1980, tells of (p. 305) the young painter's fascination with the Swedish landscape and his desire to depict this to his countrymen with exhibitions in Greece.

His work is exhibited at 'Chalmers University of Technology in Gothenburg', at 'the University of Gothenburg (School of Business, Economics and Law)' and in 'National Gallery and Alexandros Soutzos Museum' (Athens Art Museum).

In 1920, in Utby, Gothenburg he built the 'Villa Athena', which still stands in 'Utbynäs´ villastad' (created in the style of an English garden city).

Spiros Xeros is buried in 'Örgryte new cemetery' in Gothenburg with his second wife Ester Elena (Håkansson) Xenos (1903–1996), born in Helsingborg, Sweden.

Xenos died in Gothenburg, Sweden, aged 81. In a local newspaper an obituary mentioned "the well-known Gothenburg artist" Spiros Xenos and described him as "an extremely amiable person, free from harsh judgments and a wish to gain advances at others' expense".
