= Quarry Hill Creative Center =

- Mottoes: "To enjoy life and appreciate beauty and the esthetic of the creative person; to support and protect children from abuse and neglect; not to hunt or fish or kill animals."
- Location in Vermont
- Coordinates: 43°55′25″N 72°49′16″W
- Country: United States
- State: Vermont
- City: Rochester
- Corporation: Lyman Hall, Inc.
- Established: 1946
- Founder: Irving Fiske and Barbara Hall Fiske

Area
  - Total: 200 acres (81 ha)

Population (1990s)
  - Total: 90 (full-time)
  - Density: 290/sq mi (110/km^{2})

Quarry Hill Creative Center, in Rochester, Vermont, is Vermont's oldest alternative living group or community. It was founded in 1946 by Irving Fiske, a playwright, writer, and public speaker; and his wife, Barbara Hall Fiske, an artist and one of the few female cartoonists of the Golden Age of Comic Books.

== History ==
On April 10, 1946, the Fiskes bought 140 acres (0.57 km^{2}) of mountain, meadow, and brook land in Rochester, Vermont. Their intention was to create an artists’ and writers’ retreat, a gathering place for creative and freethinking people.

When the countercultural movement of the 1960s and 1970s began, hundreds of people from all over the world began to discover Quarry Hill. Many people built houses at Quarry Hill, with an agreement with the Fiskes that the land would continue to be owned by the family. Children at Quarry Hill attended its private K-12 school, the North Hollow School. The school was based on the principles of the Fiske family and of Summerhill School in England, and ran Free The Kids! Program, which offers educational material on the self-destructive and negative effect on children of spanking and other violence.

One of the residents of Quarry Hill was the late Stephen Huneck, who lived there during the mid- to late-1960s. Huneck later became a folk artist, who created the famous Dog Church in St. Johnsbury, VT with many carved dog images. He often said Barbara Fiske was one of his art teachers; William Fiske (1954-2008), the Fiskes' son, was one of his closest friends; and he called Isabella Fiske McFarlin till almost the end of his life (he committed suicide in 2010). Another resident who has achieved prominence is Alan Stirt, woodworker and bowlmaker.

In 1976, Irving and Barbara divorced, and a family-owned rental corporation, Lyman Hall, Inc., took over the land. William Fiske was its first President, a position now held by Brion T. McFarlin, who on October 14, 1984 married Isabella Fiske in Brandon, VT. William Fiske was married to Anne Fitzgerald for 10 years, and had two children Jason D. Us and Eva Isabel Us. He died on July 18, 2008, in his sleep, in Burlington, VT. Barbara Fiske married Donald W. Calhoun, a sociologist, Quaker (as Barbara had become in the 1980s) and professor of sociology at the University of Miami.

Isabella Fiske, the Fiskes' daughter, had become friends with many underground cartoonists in the 1960s, including Trina Robbins, Robert Crumb, Kim Deitch and Art Spiegelman.

In 1978 Spiegelman, Françoise Mouly, and a number of Quarry Hill residents created Top-Drawer Rubber Stamp Company, a pictorial rubber stamp company featuring art by Crumb, Spiegelman, and many other cartoonists and artists, including Barbara Fiske. This art rubber stamp company provided employment for several Quarry Hill residents.

Spiegelman and others drew a parallel between Irving Fiske and Crumb's mischievous "Guru", Mr. Natural.

Irving Fiske died of a stroke on April 25, 1990, in Ocala Florida. Barbara Fiske continued to live and teach art at Quarry Hill into her 90s, eventually moving to a nursing home in White River Junction, Vermont, where she died after several days of being read poetry by her daughter and son-in-law, and by moments of Quaker silence, as Barbara became a member of the Society of Friends in 1982, in Middlebury Vermont.
