= Sullivan Ordinance =

Vetoed 1908 New York City law prohibiting women from smoking in public places

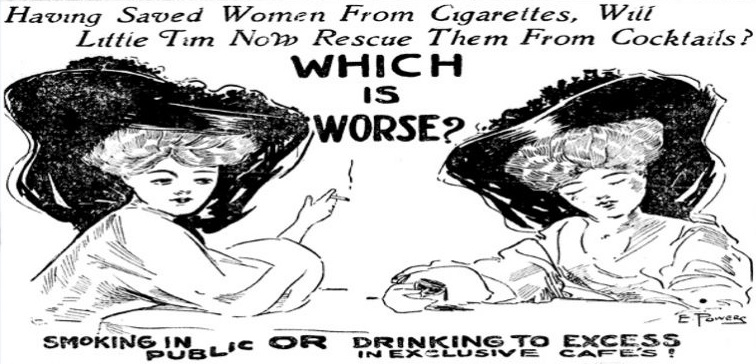
Making fun of the ordinance in The Evening World in 1908

The Sullivan Ordinance was a municipal law passed on January 21, 1908, in New York City by the board of aldermen, barring the management of a public place from allowing women to smoke within their venue. The ordinance did not bar women from smoking in general nor did the ordinance bar women from smoking in public, only public places. Right after the ordinance was enacted, on January 22, Katie Mulcahey, the only person cited for breaking this ordinance, was fined $5 for smoking in public and arrested for refusing to pay the fine; however, the ordinance itself did not mention fines nor does it ban women from smoking in public. She was released the next day. The mayor at the time, George B. McClellan Jr., vetoed the ordinance two weeks later.
