= List of Historic Artists' Homes and Studios sites =

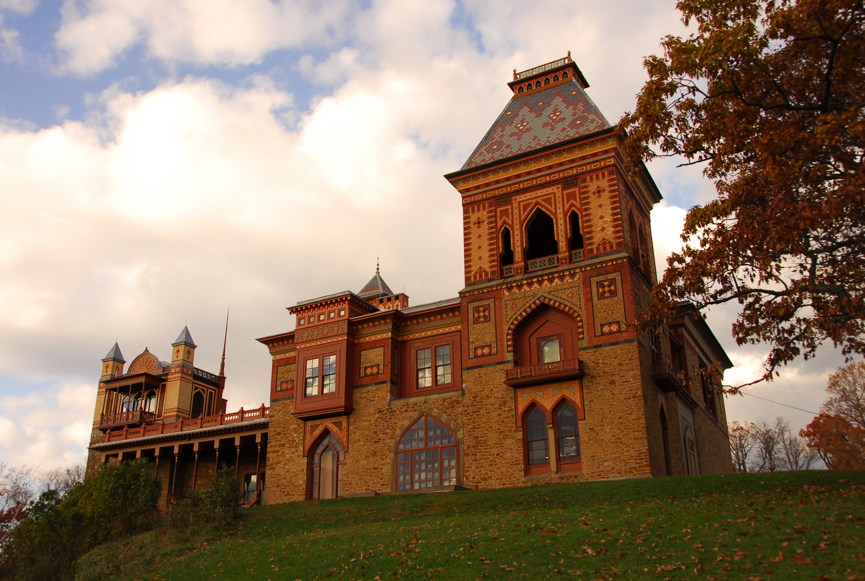
Many sites in the HAHS program, such as Olana State Historic Site (pictured) are listed on the National Register of Historic Places and/or designated National Historic Landmarks.

Historic Artists' Homes and Studios (HAHS) is a program of the National Trust for Historic Preservation (NTHP) dedicated to "telling a site-specific story of [the United States of America's] art history". HAHS sites fall under two categories: member sites and affiliate sites. Member sites are fully or partially operated by the NTHP and operate as museums open to the public. Affiliate sites are sites in early development or working towards being operated as public museums. The NTHP states that affiliate sites "may not operate as traditional house museums or be regularly open for public visitation". As of 2026 there are 93 member sites and 32 affiliate sites in the HAHS program.

== Member sites ==
=== Legend ===
* Listed on the National Register of Historic Places
** Designated a National Historic Landmark (Note: National Historic Landmarks are automatically registered to the National Register of Historic Places.)
† Designated a National Historic Site

Site	Image	Affiliated Artist	Years	Location	Notes
500 Capp Street		David Ireland	1975–2005	San Francisco, California	A noted conceptual artist, Ireland's house is "widely considered the centerpiece of [his] prolific career", the house was one of two Ireland owned on Capp Street. The other became the home of the Capp Street Project.
Abiquiú Home and Studio**		Georgia O'Keeffe	1946-1984	Abiquiú, New Mexico	The house, which "reflects a blend of Native American and Spanish Colonial building styles", has sections which date to as early as the 1740s. O'Keeffee resided in Abiquiú and Ghost Ranch, New Mexico; the latter residence is a Presbyterian Church retreat, the former is operated by the Georgia O'Keeffe Museum and is on the New Mexico State Register of Cultural Properties.
Albin Polasek House and Studio*		Albin Polasek	1950–1961	Winter Park, Florida	Polasek designed the house and studio for his sculpting work. The house is also noted for its collection of antiques from Polasek's collection. The museum and gardens are both open to visitors, showcasing work from Polasek as well as contemporary local artists.
Alice Austen House**		Alice Austen	c. 1866-1945	New York City	The only HAHS site dedicated to a photographer, the house is one of the oldest in New York and noted for its importance to LGBTQ+ history, as Austen was a lesbian. The site is a New York City Landmark and on the New York State Register of Historic Places.
Andrew Wyeth Studio**		Andrew Wyeth	1940–2009	Chadds Ford, Pennsylvania	While residing at the site, Wyeth often visited the nearby Kuerner Farm, where he created more than 1,000 paintings and drawings on subjects he found there over a span of seventy-seven years. The studio is now operated by the Brandywine Museum of Art.
Ann Norton Sculpture Gardens*		Ann Weaver Norton	1948–1982	West Palm Beach, Florida	The building, designed by noted architect Maurice Fatio, was established as a public sculpture garden in 1977 by Norton, who also taught sculpture at the Norton Museum of Art. Despite the close association, the Norton House and Norton Museum of Art are not in operations with one another.
Arthur Dove/Helen Torr Cottage		Arthur Dove, Helen Torr	1938–1967 (collectively)	Centerport, New York	Originally the town's post office and general store, Torr and Dove created art from found materials collected around the property and nearby pond. The property is owned and operated by the Heckscher Museum of Art.
Bonnet House	*	Frederic Clay Bartlett, Evelyn Fortune Bartlett	1919–1997 (collectively)	Fort Lauderdale, Florida	The winter residence for Frederick as well as his southernmost studio, the house was built on property owned by his father-in-law; much of his father-in-law's surrounding land became Hugh Taylor Birch State Park. In 1983, Evelyn deeded the property to the Florida Trust for Historic Preservation; at the time, it was the most expensive single private donation in Florida's history.
Beatrice Wood Center for the Arts		Beatrice Wood	1948–1998	Ojai, California	Though a major figure in the New York City dada scene during the 1920s, Wood grew dissuaded by the movement and moved to California in the 1930s, eventually settling in Ojai. Finding an interest in ceramics, she built a home and studio for her pottery; purposefully choosing a property across from the home of writer Jiddu Krishnamurti, whose work she admired.
Burchfield Homestead Museum	*	Charles Ephraim Burchfield	1898–1921	Salem, Ohio	Burchfield was born and raised in the house, first beginning to paint while living there. Though he later moved to Buffalo, New York, "[i]mages of Salem houses appeared in [Burchfield's] watercolors into the 1960s".
Bush-Holley House**		Theodore Robinson, Julian Alden Weir, John Henry Twachtman, Frederick Childe Hassam, Ernest Lawson, Elmer Livingston MacRae	1899–1953 (collectively)	Greenwich, Connecticut	The center of the Cos Cob art colony, Connecticut's first art colony. MacRae married into the Holley family, and he and his wife operated the building as a boarding house and art colony. The site is owned and operated by the Greenwich Historical Society.
Charles & Ray Eames Foundation**		Charles Eames, Ray Eames	1949–1988 (collectively)	Los Angeles, California	Designed by Eero Saarinen and Charles, the house was commissioned by Arts & Architecture magazine as "part of a program challenging architects to design progressive but modest homes in Southern California that demonstrated what life could be like in the modern age"; the Eames moved in to the property upon its completion. The building is designated as a Los Angeles Historic-Cultural Monument.
C. M. Russell Museum**		Charles Marion Russell	1900–1926	Great Falls, Montana	Russell's house and log cabin studio (pictured) are both preserved as part of the larger C.M. Russell Museum campus. In 1973, the house was moved about 50 feet east and 50 feet north of its original location to where it currently stands.
Chesterwood**		Daniel Chester French	1896–1931	Stockbridge, Massachusetts	French, one of the most celebrated sculptors of his generation, sculpted the statue of Lincoln for the Lincoln Memorial at this studio, with Robert Todd Lincoln visiting several times to check progress.
Couse-Sharp Historic Site*		Eanger Irving Couse, Joseph Henry Sharp	1909–1953 (collectively)	Taos, New Mexico	A significant site representing the early days of the Taos art colony, the site contains Couse's studio, as well as Sharp's nearby house and studio. Both men were founders of the Taos Society of Artists. The site is on the New Mexico State Register of Cultural Properties.
Demuth Museum**		Charles Demuth	c. 1889-1935	Lancaster, Pennsylvania	From the age of six to his death at age 51, Demuth lived in this house, using it as a studio when he began a painting career. The house is a part of the Lancaster Historic District and features a garden "planted with many of the same flowers cultivated by the artist’s mother".
Dr. James W. Washington Jr. & Mrs. Janie Rogella Washington Foundation		James W. Washington Jr.	1945–2000	Seattle, Washington	A "living time capsule", the Washington's house contains not only James W. Washington Jr.'s studio, but also their vast collection of artifacts and collected materials from their extensive international travels. The site is also noted for its intricately landscaped gardens and is a designated Seattle Landmark.
Edward Hopper House Museum & Study Center*		Edward Hopper	1882–1910	Nyack, New York	Hopper was born in the house and lived here until moving to New York City in 1910. The house now displays exhibits and artifacts related to Hopper's life, as well as work from local artists. The site's garden also hosts small musical performances.
Edward V. Valentine Sculpture Studio**		Edward V. Valentine	1876–1926	Richmond, Virginia	Housed within the Wickham House, Valentine's studio is open to the public alongside exhibits examining Valentine's work perpetuating Lost Cause narratives in his work. His defaced statue of Jefferson Davis is also on display. The studio is beside The Valentine, a history museum founded by Valentine's brother.
Elisabet Ney Museum*		Elisabet Ney	1892–1907	Austin, Texas	Also known as Formosa, the studio contains over fifty busts sculpted by Ney of notable figures such as William Jennings Bryan and Otto von Bismarck. The site is a registered Texas State Antiquity Landmark and Recorded Texas Historic Landmark and operated by Austin Parks and Recreation.
Florence Griswold Home**		Henry Ward Ranger, Willard Leroy Metcalf, Robert William Vonnoh, Frederick Childe Hassam, Frank Vincent DuMond, William Chadwick, Matilda Browne	1903–c. 1940s (collectively)	Old Lyme, Connecticut	The home of artist Florence Griswold was the center of the Old Lyme art colony, America's first art colony to adopt Impressionism, though the NTHP does not list Griswold as an affiliated artist for the property. The studio of artist William Chadwick is preserved as a part of the current-day museum.
Fonthill Castle*		Henry Chapman Mercer	1912–1930	Doylestown, Pennsylvania	Mercer, an archaeologist and tile maker, designed the site with a notable arts and crafts interior and a poured concrete exterior. The house's museum showcases tiles by Mercer, as well as ancient tablets from Mercer's personal collection. It is located near the Moravian Pottery and Tile Works, which Mercer owned, operated, and designed. The site is operated by the Mercer Museum and a contributing property to a National Historic Landmark District containing nearby works of Mercer's.
Frelinghuysen Morris House and Studio*		George L.K. Morris, Suzy Morris	1941–1988 (collectively)	Lenox, Massachusetts	George Morris' family had owned the property in Lenox since the early 1900s; in 1941, Morris and his wife (née Frelinghuysen) moved to the site after their marriage. The Bauhaus-style artist studio was commissioned by Morris in 1930.
Gari Melchers Home & Studio*		Gari Melchers	1916–1932	Falmouth, Virginia	Originally built in the 18th-century, Melchers acquired the property in 1916 and renovated it extensively. Melchers lived in the house after painting his distinctive murals at the Thomas Jefferson Building. The site is listed on the Virginia Landmarks Register and is a contributing property to the Falmouth Historic District. It is operated by the University of Mary Washington.
Grace Hudson Museum & Sun House*		Grace Hudson	1911–1937	Ukiah, California	The property contains Sun House, a Craftsman-style California bungalow made of redwood which was Hudson's residence after moving to California from Oklahoma. The house, which is a California Historical Landmark, sits adjacent to a museum dedicated to Hudson's life and work.
Grant Wood Studio		Grant Wood	1924–1935	Cedar Rapids	The studio wherein Wood painted American Gothic (1930) and several other notable works. The building is now owned by the Cedar Rapids Museum of Art, which it stands behind, and is a part of the Grant Wood Cultural District.
Historic Westwood, Adelia Armstrong Lutz House & Studio*		Adelia Armstrong Lutz	1890–1931	Knoxville, Tennessee	A rare example of a Queen Anne style house in Knoxville built with brick and Richardsonian Romanesque elements, the house is built on property once owned by Lutz's father. Lutz lived in the house during her art career and while serving as director of the Knoxville Art Club and as a co-organizer of the Nicholson Art League.
Ilan-Lael: James Hubbell Home and Studio		James Hubbell	1958–2021	Julian, California	A notable example of organic and compared to the work of Antonio Gaudí by the San Diego Union Tribune, Hubbell's original plan to build a one-room stone cabin with his wife after their wedding eventually led to the creation of Ilan-Lael, a compound of fourteen separate buildings interconnected with Hubbell's unique architectural flourishes. The site was Hubbell's home for most of his life.
James Castle House		James Charles Castle	1931–1977	Boise, Idaho	Castle moved to Boise with his family at the age of 32. Deaf and unable to read or write, he lived at his family home his entire life, turning the shed into a studio for his illustration and collage work. The site is now operated by the Boise City Department of Arts and History.
James Fitzgerald – Rockwell Kent Historic Artists’ Home and Studio*		Rockwell Kent, Alice Kent Stoddard, James Fitzgerald	1906-1971 (collectively)	Monhegan, Maine	The cottage and studio, designed by Kent, were owned by the architect until 1910, at which point Kent sold the site to Stoddard. Stoddard eventually sold the property back to Kent, and Kent sold the studio to Fitzgerald in 1952. By the time of his death in 1971, Fitzgerald owned the studio and the house. The site is currently owned by Monhegan Museum and Library.
John F. Peto Studio Museum		John F. Peto	1889–1907	Island Heights, New Jersey	After moving to the site in 1889, Peto, who never had a public exhibition of his work in his lifetime, took in boarders to the house and found work playing cornet at the town's camp revival meetings. Peto also supplemented his income by selling his paintings to tourists, though he never achieved notoriety in his lifetime. Following his death in 1907, the house remained in the family until opening to the public in 2011.
Judd Foundation*		Donald Judd	1968–1994	New York City	Judd acquired the building, built in 1870 and a part of the SoHo-Cast Iron Historic District, in 1968. It was here where he "first developed the concept of permanent installation", adding unique furniture, artwork, and decoration to create one of his minimalist installation pieces. (The building's listing on the National Register of Historic Places is unrelated to Judd's contributions to the site)
La Mansana de Chinati (The Block) / Judd Foundation		Donald Judd	c. 1973-1994	Marfa, Texas	Sometime between 1973 and 1974 Judd acquired a compound of buildings the size of a city block in Marfa, dedicating it as a workspace for his art. The compound contains two hangars Judd used as a studio, as well as gardens and outdoor areas. Judd and his family lived in former offices of the United States Army Quartermaster Corps, which they renamed La Mansana de Chinati (The Block).
Mabel and Victor D’Amico Studio and Archive, D’Amico House & The Art Barge		Victor D'Amico	c. 1940-1987	Amagansett, New York	HAHS recognizes several buildings related to D'Amico as part of the site, including The Art Barge, a repurposed World War II Navy barge upon which D'Amico taught art classes. Originally anchored in Napeague Harbor, the barge is now beached on the shore. D'Amico's house and studio are located nearby.
Manitoga / The Russel Wright Design Center**		Russel Wright, Mary Wright	c. 1961-1976	Garrison, New York	The Wrights, both of whom designed the residence, were noted industrial designers. The residence, named Dragon Rock, is a notable early example of a sustainable house and considered "an outstanding example of Organic Modern architecture". Though Mary Wright is closely associated with the property, she never actually lived there, as she died before its construction. The site is listed on the New York State Register of Historic Places.
Melrose on the Cane (Melrose Plantation)**		Clementine Hunter	1902–1988	Melrose, Louisiana	The plantation is one of the largest in the United States built by and for free people of color. Though built in 1833, the NTHP associates the site with Hunter, who moved to the site in 1902. Hunter worked on the plantation picking cotton and spent time painting scenes of black southern life on a plantation in the early 20th century, providing an invaluable record of the period. The entire plantation, including Hunter's artist cabin and her house, are open to the public.
N. C. Wyeth House & Studio*		N.C. Wyeth	1911–1945	Chadds Ford Township, Pennsylvania	Wyeth's home and studio, located on a ridge that is a part of the Brandywine Battlefield area. The house was designed for Wyeth, who contributed to its design. Wyeth's son, painter Andrew Wyeth, was raised in the home, though the site is principally associated with his father. The site is owned and operated by the Brandywine Museum of Art.
Noah Purifoy Outdoor Desert Museum of Assemblage Sculpture		Noah Purifoy	1989–2004	Joshua Tree, California	A notable example of assemblage sculpture, Purifoy began designing and constructing works on his ten-acre property in 1989. His studio and home also stand on the site. Per Purifoy's wishes, the outdoor museum is not fenced in, allowing the works to "sit amid and interact with the environment and adjacent landscape on the desert floor".
Norman Rockwell Studio		Norman Rockwell	c. 1960-1976	Stockbridge, Massachusetts	Rockwell moved to Stockbridge in 1953, with many locals serving as models for Rockwell's paintings and Saturday Evening Post covers. Though this studio was not Rockwell's first or only in Stockbridge, it is his "only surviving studio among [his] approximately 20 workspaces". The building was moved from its original location behind Rockwell's house to the campus of the Norman Rockwell Museum in 1986 and is now open to visitors.
Olana State Historic Site**		Frederic Edwin Church	1860–1900	Greenport, New York	The property, containing buildings designed by Church and Richard Morris Hunt, was Church's home and studio for the later part of his career. A major figure of the Hudson River School, the site is fittingly situated on the banks of the Hudson River overlooking the Catskill Range. The site is listed on the New York State Register of Historic Places.
Opus 40*		Harvey Fite	1938–1976	Saugerties, New York	A notable example of land art, Fite purchased the land that became Opus 40 in 1938 and began developing it into a Mayan-inspired landscape soon thereafter. Over the course of thirty-seven years, he transformed an abandoned quarry by "fitting together hundreds of thousands of stones without mortar to create 6.5 acres of interlocking terraces, ramps, and platforms crowned by a nine-ton monolith". Fite lived on the property of the piece and died while working on it.
Pasaquan*		Eddie Owens Martin	1956–1986	Buena Vista, Georgia	After acquiring his family's farm, Martin constructed colorful structures across the property in honor of a religion he created called Pasaquoyanism. The property is a notable example of folk art and has been designated a U.S. Historic District. It is currently owned by Columbus State University.
Pollock-Krasner House and Study Center**		Jackson Pollock, Lee Krasner	1945–1984 (collectively)	East Hampton, New York	The property contains Pollock and Krasner's house, as well as the barn both used as a studio. Notably, the original floor and walls of the barn have been preserved, showcasing splatters of paint left by both artists from their respective artworks. The site is owned by Stony Brook University.
Pond Farm Pottery*		Marguerite Wildenhain	c. 1947-1985	Guerneville, California	Also known as Pond Farm Workshops, the site was an artist colony, though it is most closely associated with Wildenhain – her studio, residence, and guest cottage are all preserved as part of the site. The site is noted for its importance to the American Studio Pottery Movement, with Wildenhain's Bauhaus-inspired work being particularly influential.
Saarinen House		Eliel Saarinen, Loja Saarinen, Zoltan Sepeshy, Pipsan Saarinen Swanson, Eero Saarinen, Wallace Mitchell, Roy Slade	1930–c. 1994 (collectively)	Bloomfield Hills, Michigan	A prime example of Art Deco architecture, Eliel Saarinen designed this residence for his family on the campus of the Cranbrook Academy of Art, where he was a professor. The house is now owned by the school and open for tours. Eliel's children, Eero and Pipsan, were raised in the house. Upon Eliel's death, the site became the residence for Cranbrook's presidents, including Sepeshy, Mitchell, and Slade, before being opened as a museum in 1994.
Saint-Gaudens National Historical Park^{†}		Augustus Saint-Gaudens, Augusta Homer Saint-Gaudens	1885–1926 (collectively)	Cornish, New Hampshire	The centerpiece of the Cornish Art Colony, Augustus Saint-Gaudens maintained a studio and residence on the property with his wife, painter Augusta Homer Saint-Gaudens. The site contains reproductions of several of Augustus' most famous works, including the Robert Gould Shaw Memorial, Abraham Lincoln: The Man, and Diana. It is one of two National Historical Parks designated to the visual arts.
Sam and Alfreda Maloof Foundation for Arts and Crafts*		Sam Maloof, Alfreda Ward Maloof	1953–1998	Rancho Cucamonga, California	Both Maloofs were noted artists, with Sam finding international recognition as a furnituremaker and Alfreda serving as the Director of Arts and Crafts at the Santa Fe Indian School. Sam designed the compound himself, with many of the buildings containing hand-carved furniture and features by him. The site also houses a museum dedicated to showcasing Arts and Crafts artwork. The compound was moved from its original location to its present location in 2000 due to the construction of California State Route 210.
Soldner Center for the Arts and Innovation		Paul Soldner, Virginia (Ginny) Soldner	1956–2011 (collectively)	Aspen, Colorado	One of Paul Soldner's two ceramic studios (the other being in California), Paul and his wife Virginia built the house by hand; many of Paul's ceramic pieces and Virginia's abstract paintings are on display. It now operates as an art and community center.
Stone Quarry Art Park (Dorothy Riester House and Studio)*		Dorothy Riester	1960–2017	Cazenovia, New York	Though Riester built a house on the property in 1960, she did not establish the Stone Quarry Art Park, an outdoor space for contemporary art, until 1991. The 104-acre property is open the public to view works by Riester and other artists.
T.C. Steele State Historic Site*		T. C. Steele	1907–1926	Nashville, Indiana	Also known as the "House of the Singing Winds", Steele moved to the property after attending the Academy of Fine Arts, Munich. He painted hundreds of works at the site and is buried there. The site an Indiana State Historic Site and owned by the Indiana State Museum. His childhood home is also open to the public, but not recognized by the NTHP.
The Kirkland		Vance Kirkland	1932–1981	Denver, Colorado	Built in 1911, the building housed the Kirkland School of Art from 1932 to 1946, with Kirkland using the building as a studio afterwards. In 2016, Kirkland's studio was moved from its original location at 13th Avenue and Pearl Street in Denver to the site of the then-unbuilt Kirkland Museum of Fine & Decorative Art (pictured), where it is now open to the public alongside exhibits on Kirkland's work.
The Madoo Conservatory		Robert Dash	1967–2013	Sagaponack, New York	Dash, a painter, dedicated himself to cultivating an expansive garden on the property, which he named Madoo. Madoo is noted for its integration of the natural world and poetry; Dash invited many writers to the site who were in turn inspired by the gardens. Poet John Koethe stated Madoo was "one of the great literary salons of the late-20th century", and James Schuyler wrote the poem People Who See Bubbles Rise about the house's decorations.
The Stickley Museum at Craftsman Farms**		Gustav Stickley	1908–1915	Morris Plains, New Jersey	Stickley designed the building to be the main club house of a farm school for boys he was interested in opening. The site was thus made to be self-sufficient with gardens and stables for agriculture. The farm school never came to fruition, and Stickley sold the property in 1915 before filing for bankruptcy. Much of his original furniture and tile work, both of which he designed, remains on display at the site.
The Renee & Chaim Gross Foundation		Chaim Gross	1962–1991	New York City	Gross lived in this Greenwich Village townhouse for the later period of his career. Many of his sculptures are on display at the site, as well as those of his contemporaries. The site is noted for displaying important works of American, European, Pre-Columbian and African art collected by Gross.
Thomas and Mary Nimmo Moran Studio**		Thomas Moran, Mary Nimmo Moran	1884–1926 (collectively)	East Hampton, New York	The Moran's house is noted for its unique blend of architectural styles, integrating "Romantic Victorian cottage style with strong Queen Anne elements [and] touches of Colonial Revival and Italianate as well". The property features the couple's art studio and house, as well as gardens.
Thomas Cole National Historic Site^{†}		Thomas Cole	1833–1848	Catskill, New York	Also known as Cedar Grove, Cole purchased the property after the establishment of the Hudson River School, which he founded. The house's views of the Hudson River inspired Cole and is seen reflected in his romantic landscape paintings. The site is an affiliate area of the National Park Service.
Thomas Hart Benton Home and Studio State Historic Site		Thomas Hart Benton	1939–1975	Kansas City, Missouri	After moving to the site in 1939, Benton converted part of the property's carriage house into an art studio. His art materials, workspace, and several artworks are on display. The site is a noted property in Kansas City's Roanoke neighborhood and a Missouri State Historic Site; it is managed by Missouri state parks.
Weir Farm National Historical Park^{†}		Julian Alden Weir, Mahonri Mackintosh Young, Dorothy Weir Young, Sperry Andrews, Doris Bass Andrews	1882–1990 (collectively)	Wilton, Connecticut	One of two National Parks related to visual arts, the Weir Farm was the home of J. Alden Weir's family, including his daughter (Dorothy) and her husband (Mahonri Young), both notable artists. After a century of remaining in the Weir-Young family, the property was acquired for preservation by the National Park Service due to efforts led by artists Sperry and Doris Bass Andrews in 1990.
Wharton Esherick Museum**		Wharton Esherick	1913–1970	Malvern, Pennsylvania	A notable example of Expressionist architecture, the property contains four buildings designed by Esherick including his home and studio. Esherick considered the studio "his autobiography", as he "filled [it] with [his own] art and personal objects", creating "an inhabitable artwork". Though the studio is the museum's centerpiece, Esherick only began construction on it in 1926, having lived on the property since 1913.
Winslow Homer Studio**		Winslow Homer	1884–1910	Scarborough	Homer's studio was built in 1884 and renovated extensively after his death in 1910 by his family. Many of his late career pieces based on maritime scenes were inspired by working at the site. In 2006, the studio was acquired by the Portland Museum of Art, who restored the building to its appearance during Homer's lifetime. The studio is now open for tours.

== Affiliate sites ==
=== Legend ===
* Listed on the National Register of Historic Places
** Designated a National Historic Landmark (Note: National Historic Landmarks are automatically registered to the National Register of Historic Places.)

Site	Image	Affiliated Artist	Years	Location	Notes
Aminah Brenda Lynn Robinson Home-Studio and Artist's Residence		Aminah Brenda Lynn Robinson	1974–2015	Columbus, Ohio	A "treasure trove of African American heritage and artistic brilliance", the site preserves Robinson's home and studio, as well as numerous works of hers around the property. Robinson's house is noted for the unique paintings and decorations in its interior, as well as the found object pieces on the front walkway.
Arts Center at Duck Creek		John Little	1948–1984	East Hampton, New York	Upon urging from fellow artist Lee Krasner, Little purchased the site in 1948, occupying the house (built in the 1790s) and transporting a barn (built in 1890) from elsewhere in East Hampton to the property for use as an art studio. The property became a hub for artists on Long Island; Little hosted artists such as Krasner, Jackson Pollock, and Willem de Kooning. The site is now an art center for local artists and performances.
The Beer Can House		John Milkovisch	1940–1988	Houston, Texas	Beginning in 1968, Milkovisch, a retired upholsterer for the Southern Pacific Railroad, began covering his house with repurposed pieces of aluminium beer cans. The house is estimated to have over 50,000 cans attached to it.
Carl Schmitt Foundation		Carl Schmitt	c. 1918-1989	Wilton, Connecticut	Sometime after his marriage in 1918, Schmitt and his wife moved to the Silvermine area of Wilton, where he established a home and studio. Health and financial troubles led to Schmitt living much of his later life in isolation at the property, though he did attend gallery openings occasionally.
Carolee Schneemann Foundation		Carolee Schneemann	1965–2019	New Platz, New York	The only NTHP site dedicated to an artist who primarily worked in performance art, Schneemann lived in the house for much of her life. Musician James Tenney, to whom Schneemann was married to from 1956 to 1968, also lived in the house for a period; their domestic life and sexual relationship at the house inspired much of Schneemann's work.
Dog Mountain, Home of Stephen Huneck Gallery		Stephen Huneck	1995–2010	St. Johnsbury, Vermont	One of his generation's most celebrated folk artists, Huneck's house and studio are located on Dog Mountain beside The Dog Chapel, a chapel Huneck built by hand dedicated to dogs. The site is fittingly a dog park, and Huneck's home is open as a gallery for his art to the public.
Elaine de Kooning House and Studio*		Elaine de Kooning	1975–1989	East Hampton, New York	De Kooning's studio and residence at the time of her death, the site was where she painted her Cave Walls and Cave Paintings series from 1985 to 1988. As implied by the name, the house was not the residency of de Kooning's husband, painter Willem de Kooning, as the couple lived separately for much of their lives. After de Kooning's death, the house was briefly the studio of sculptor John Chamberlain.
Elizabeth Strong-Cuevas Foundation		Elizabeth de Cuevas	c. 1960s-2023	Amagansett, New York	The studio and home of de Cuevas (the NTHP uses the name Strong-Cuevas, one of her many monikers) on Long Island was designed by architect Paul Lester Wiener and displays several of de Cuevas' pieces on the grounds. Her studio at the site has been turned into a gallery of her work for the public.
The Emile Brunel Studio/Residence and Sculpture Park*		Emile Brunel	1929–1944	Olive, New York	In 1929, Brunel purchased the land on which he would build a house and eventually his sculpture garden. A French immigrant, Brunel was fascinated by Native American culture and began sculpting enormous works representing Native American leaders and spiritual figures. One of the pieces at the site, Moon Haw Haw, is thirty feet tall. Brunel also opened a gift shop on the site which sells goods manufactured by local tribes; the shop remains open to the public alongside the gardens.
Gertrude Vanderbilt Whitney Studio at the New York Studio School**		Gertrude Vanderbilt Whitney	1931–1942	New York City	The original location of the Whitney Museum of American Art, Whitney had already built out her original studio to a gallery to showcase work by young American artists and was looking to expand. In 1931, she commissioned three rowhouses to be turned into a gallery for her art collection and a residence for herself. The Whitney Museum of American Art was located at the site until 1954; Whitney remained at the residence until her death. The site is listed on the New York State Register of Historic Places.
Grandma Prisbrey's Bottle Village*		Tressa "Grandma" Prisbrey	1946–1982	Simi Valley	A notable example of a folk art environment, Prisbrey used recycled materials from a local landfill to decorate her house and surrounding structures. The site is a California Historical Landmark.
The Jacobson House*		Oscar Jacobson	c. 1915-1966	Norman, Oklahoma	Jacobson, an architect and painter, was a patron of the Kiowa Six, hosting them at his house throughout his life. He dedicated much of his life to promoting Native American art as director of the University of Oklahoma's School of Art. His house is now The Jacobson House Native Art Center, a museum and venue for Native American art and cultural events.
John James Audubon Center at Mill Grove**		John James Audubon	c. 1803–c. 1808	Audubon, Pennsylvania	Audubon's father purchased the property in 1789, sending his son to the site in 1803 to survey it for mining opportunities. While at the site, Audubon became interested in the local flora and fauna, igniting his lifelong passion for nature. Audubon never owned Mill Grove – it belonged to his father – who allowed Audubon to sell the house around 1808 following the discovery the mining operation would be ineffective and Audubon's marriage.
Jonathan Fisher House*		Jonathan Fisher	1797–1847	Blue Hill, Maine	Aside from being Blue Hill's first Congregational minister, Fisher was also a prolific writer and artist. His house is a notable example of a Federal style house in New England.
Langlais Art Preserve		Bernard Langlais	1966–1977	Cushing, Maine	The home, studio, and sculpture gallery of Langlais are all preserved as part of this site, which includes several large-scale wooden sculptures by the artist. Langlais believed strongly in the integration of art and nature; hiking trails, nature walks, and gardens are accessible at the site.
Lelooska Foundation & Cultural Center		Chief Lelooska	c. 1960s-1996	Ariel, Washington	Chief Lelooska, a Kwakwakaʼwakw leader, was a celebrated carver and storyteller. His home and studio are now preserved as part of a larger campus which houses a museum which highlights the history and culture of Kwakwaka'wakw and other Native American tribes of the Pacific Northwest. A living museum, many performances, demonstrations, and cultural celebrations are hosted at the site.
LongHouse Reserve		Jack Lenor Larsen	1986–2020	East Hampton, New York	Designed by Larsen as a home and nature preserve, LongHouse Reserve includes Larsen's residence, an arboretum, and sixteen acres of gardens and lawns for public art and plant collections. Larsen, a textile designer and not a sculptor, has no works on display in the gardens, but works by artists such as Yoko Ono, Willem de Kooning, and Dale Chihuly can be seen. A reproduction of Buckminster Fuller's Fly's Eye Dome is located at the site.
Louise Bourgeois Home		Louise Bourgeois	1962–2010	New York City	The studio and home of Bouregeois are preserved across two townhouses. Bourgeois' materials, equipment, and several of her works are on display as part of the site. She also held her renowned Sunday Salons" at the studio, making it a notable meeting place for artists in the Chelsea area.
L.V. Hull Home & Studio		L.V. Hull	1974–2008	Kosciusko, Mississippi	In 1974, Hull purchased this house and began displaying her assemblage art and painting work on the front lawn and exterior of the house. Upon her death, much of Hull's work was removed from her house and brought to Kosciusko City Hall; it has since been acquired by a foundation dedicated to Hull's legacy and is in the process of being returned to Hull's house for display.
Mary Nohl Art Environment*		Mary Nohl	1924–2001	Fox Point, Wisconsin	Originally owned by Nohl's parents, Nohl acquired the property after their deaths and used her inheritance to begin creating large sculptures made of found materials, principally concrete, glass, and driftwood. She decorated the exterior of the house with concrete and ceramic tiles featuring her designs and turned the property surrounding the house into a sculpture garden showcasing her work.
Olive Rush Historic Artist Home & Garden		Olive Rush	1920–1966	Santa Fe, New Mexico	The first woman to have a solo show at the Museum of New Mexico and a major figure in the Santa Fe art colony, Rush was one of the most celebrated female artists in the modernist movement. Her home, studio, and gardens are preserved as part of the site, with her home featuring several frescoes by the artist. Rush was known for mentoring Native American artists at her house and supplied neighbors with food grown on the site.
Popes Museum*		Laura Pope Forester	c. 1900s-1953	Ochlocknee, Georgia	The NTHP claims "Pope’s Museum is the oldest surviving artist-built environment created by a woman in the United States"; Pope began constructing large statues out of mortar sometime between the late 1900s and early 1910s on the grounds of her family's property. Her work "showcased the contributions of women in history by portraying [female] religious, patriotic, and literary figures"; Pope opened the site to the public in 1924. The site now preserves Pope's work and home, also serving as an event venue.
Prophet Isaiah Robertson's Second Coming House		Isaiah Robertson	2004–2020	Niagara Falls, New York	A native of Jamaica, Robertson lived in Canada before moving to the United States, where he became a parishioner at Mount Erie Baptist Church in Niagara Falls. Robertson confessed to having no interest in art before receiving a vision from God to decorate his house with extravagant carpentry work and wooden decorations painted with bright colors. Robertson worked "without plans" on the site, stating "that 'the Spirit' simply [took] over and animate[d] his carpenter hands".
Randall Davey Audubon Center and Sanctuary*		Randall Davey	1920–1964	Santa Fe, New Mexico	In 1847, the site's main building was constructed as the first sawmill in New Mexico Territory; Davey purchased the property in 1920 and "converted it to a residence, but preserved its architectural integrity". The site served as Davey's home and studio until his death, eventually being acquired by the National Audubon Society. The property is now a wildlife sanctuary and popular with birdwatchers and botany enthusiasts; Davey's home and studio are also open to the public.
Reuben Hale House		Reuben Hale	1961–2018	West Palm Beach, Florida	Hale, a classically trained portrait artist, believed "one of the most powerful sociological developments of the 20th century was the change in status of women in society", leading to his El Cid neighborhood studio being filled with statues, paintings, and murals which show women "exud[ing] strength through confident poses and forward movement".
Richard Schmid Foundation		Richard Schmid	c. 1998/2000s-2021	Walpole, New Hampshire	Schmid, "the recipient of virtually every major award in American art", lived and worked at this property for much of his career. Practicing the alla prima style of painting, Schmid was noted for his work as an educator and lecturer on the subject of realist painting. The property contains his home and studio and occasionally holds public events.
Shigeko Kubota Video Art Foundation		Shigeko Kubota, Nam June Paik	c. 1970s-2015 (collectively)	New York City	The only NTHP site dedicated to Video artists and first HAHS site honoring Asian artists, the site preserves Kubota and Paik's studio, wherein they created many of their best-known works. The site also details Kubota's contributions to performance art. The site is a significant example of a "Fluxhouse" – a site where members of the Fluxus movement lived and worked together.
S.P. Dinsmoor's Cabin Home and Garden of Eden*		Samuel P. Dinsmoor	c. 1904-1932	Lucas, Kansas	In either 1904 or 1907 (sources vary), Dinsmoor, a Civil War veteran, began creating concrete sculptures around his property depicting religious scenes and promoting his Populist beliefs. The site features "150+ life-sized figures that tell allegorical stories about corporate greed, labor rights, and social justice". Dinsmoor's body is on display inside a coffin with a glass lid at the house.
Spiral House Park		Tom Gottsleben	1997–2019	Saugerties, New York	In 1997, Gottsleben's wife asked him to build a small guest house on their property. The project eventually evolved into the Spiral House, a five-story cylindrical structure resembling a conical seashell. The building's façade features intricate crystal glasswork, stonework, ironwork, and artwork created by Gottsleben.
Thomas Day Historic House		Thomas Day	1848–1858	Milton, North Carolina	Day, a freedman, moved to Milton and established a shop crafting furniture for wealthy clients, becoming "the largest furniture maker in the state by 1850". His house and workshop now stand a museum showcasing his life and work, as well as a notable look into the life of a formerly enslaved man during the period before the Civil War.
Vermont Village		Ed Levine	N/A	South Royalton, Vermont	Inspired by the writings of Henry David Thoreau, Levine created "more than fifty site-specific wooden structures that exist between sculpture and architecture, exploring humanity’s relationship to the natural world". Unlike other sites recognized by HAHS, Levine never lived at Vermont Village
Valley of the Moon		George Phar Legler	c. 1923-1982	Tucson, Arizona	A fairytale-style garden around Legler's house, designed and built in part by him, the site is a notable example of storybook architecture and a precursor to the modern amusement park. Legler was known for his beliefs in Spiritualism and "believed in fairies, magical creatures, and the notion that kindness was the key to making the world a better place", constructing the site with found materials and taking local children on tours of the grounds. Following his death, the property became a local tourist attraction.
