= Dog Mountain (disambiguation) =

Dog Mountain rises above the north side of the Columbia River Gorge in the U.S. state of Washington.

Dog Mountain may also refer to:

- Inuyama, Aichi (literally "dog mountain"), a city located near Nagoya, Japan
- Dog Mountain, located in Mount Seymour Provincial Park, North Vancouver, Canada
- Dog Mountain (dog park), a farm in St. Johnsbury, Vermont, U.S.

== See also ==
- Almost-a-Dog Mountain, Montana, U.S.
- Little Dog Mountain, Montana, U.S.
- Mountain dog
