= Jim Rennert =

American sculptor

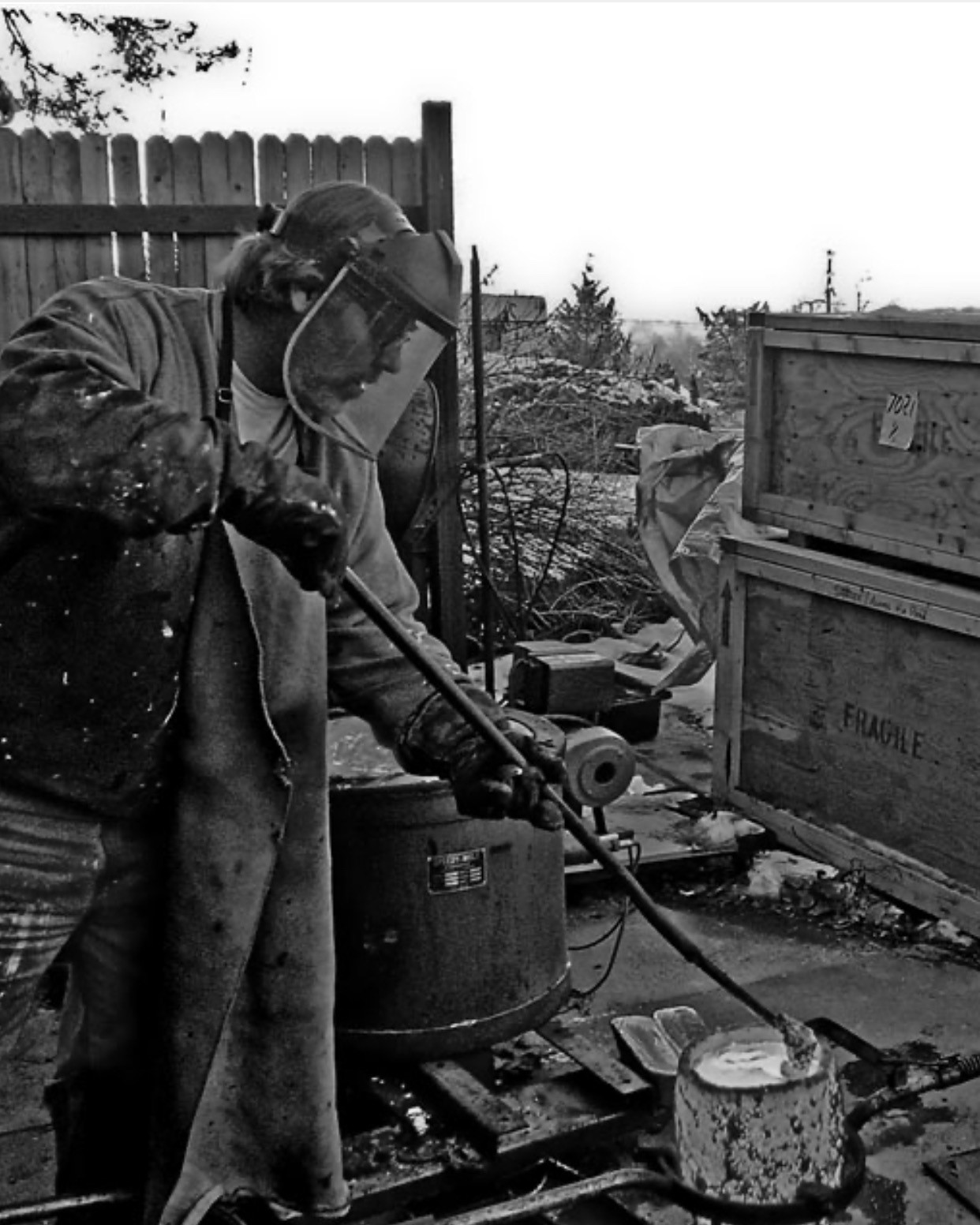
- Born: James Rennert; 1958 (age 67–68); Phoenix, Arizona, U.S.
- Education: Brigham Young University
- Known for: Figural bronze sculptures in suits
- Notable work: Think Big
- Style: Sculpture
- Movement: Social realism
- Elected: National Sculpture Society, 2008
- Website: http://www.jimrennert.com

Jim Rennert (born 1958) is an American figural sculptor, working primarily in bronze depictions of everyman figures in business suits. He grew up in the Southwest United States before moving to Dallas, where he became a businessman. After 10 years in the business world, Rennert took up sculpting, initially of children and sports figures. In 2004, he began his Everyman series of men in business suits for which he is best known. The Everyman series depicts figures in suits and deals with everyday challenges and struggles meant to be immediately relatable to any given viewer. He has had several public exhibitions of large-scale works, including in New York's Union Square and on Sixth Avenue, as well as the Ann Norton Sculpture Garden in Palm Beach.

== Biography ==
=== Early life ===
Jim Rennert was born in Phoenix, Arizona, but grew up in Las Vegas, Nevada, where he lived for 13 years. Rennert's father was a businessman, and his mother was a homemaker. Rennert began drawing in school at 11 and was initially discouraged from pursuing art after receiving poor grades in his art class. At the age of 14, Rennert's family relocated to Salt Lake City, where he finished high school. He attended Brigham Young University on a wrestling scholarship from 1976 to 1981, but he dropped out prior to graduation to work in oil fields in Oklahoma.

In the 1980s, Rennert moved to Dallas, where he worked as a stockbroker on oil and gas investments and owned a brokerage firm. Rennert also worked as an investment banker and at one point purchased and sold a golf ball company.

=== Artistic career ===
The ten years Rennert spent in the corporate world in different roles met with only moderate success. After selling the golf ball company and considering his next career change, he was inspired to pursue an artistic career. Initially considering drawing, Rennert instead opted to purchase clay and attempt to sculpt, which he took to naturally, the first pieces he sculpted being of his two sons. Rennert consulted with a friend at Brigham Young University who encouraged Rennert to pursue sculpture, and in 1990, he started sculpting. Rennert taught himself how to sculpt bronze using the lost-wax casting method while working on different jobs to support himself.

Rennert's first sculpture was cast in 1992 at a foundry in Lehi, Utah, and he worked closely with the foundry to learn all aspects of lost-wax casting so that he could do it himself. He then purchased his own equipment and set up a studio and personal foundry in his garage and driveway. Rennert decided to attempt to sell his work and hauled a 50 lb sculpture around from gallery to gallery in Park City, Utah, until he found a gallery that was willing to take on the piece. By 1993, Rennert began showing in galleries with Meyer Gallery being the first to represent him.

Initially creating sculptures of children and sports figures, Rennert began depicting men in suits following a commission of the work, A Deal's a Deal, by real estate developer Thomas Lloyd in 2004. Rennert's sculpting assistant advised him to pursue further works in this vein, and the men in suits have since become his hallmark. In 2005, Rennert began working with Cavalier Galleries after responding to a call for artists and having one of his works sold at a gallery opening soon after. The gallery owner, Ron Cavalier, saw an opportunity for his gallery's white-collar clientele to see their own daily struggles and lives finally represented in art by figures who look like them. Cavalier has represented Rennert since then.

In 2008, Rennert was elected a member of the National Sculpture Society. Beginning in 2016, Rennert also began creating two-dimensional artwork. Around 2019, he moved from Utah to New York City, and in 2019, he also began sculpting female figures in his works.

== Work ==
Rennert's works in his Everyman series tend to focus on the everyday struggles of the common man, while often referencing his experiences in the business world.

=== Style and technique ===
Along with moving away from depictions of children and athletes, Rennert's overall artistic style has changed with regard to appearance, tone, message, and range of sizes. The following section focuses entirely on the stylistic evolution of Rennert's Everyman/Suits series as this now makes up the bulk of his work.

His early works tended to show a figure in greater detail, but this led to people thinking that a specific person was being depicted, rather than an idea. As a response to this, his later works can at times assume a more abstract appearance. Rennert's earlier works also placed a greater emphasis on movement and physicality. Parallels have been drawn between intellectual struggles in the business world and physical struggles in the sports world, and these parallels have been inferred to such an extent, that his works were often seen as fusing those two worlds together, focusing on competition in the business world. Rennert's later works have become more introspective as he has sought to move away from physical expression to more thoughtful expression. While the figures have retained the suits for which they are best known, they have also moved away from being solely representations of businessmen to being representations of any given person. This is best reflected in the change of the title of the series from Suits to Everyman.

His works have also grown in their overall scale ranging from smaller works to life-size and multiple monumental pieces. Rennert's artwork is generally classed as being social realist in nature.

He tries to bring a sense of motion into his works by paying attention to movement and figure placement in each work:

I try to emphasize movement in the figures as well as some of the forms by paying particular attention to their placement in relation to each other as well as on the supporting base. This presents a strong element of design in each work.

Rennert's work, starting out as being humorous, has becoming increasingly serious. This is a reflection of a greater focus on everyday challenges faced by individuals, such as the viewer, so as to create a connection where the viewer can immediately relate to the work. Rennert has said:

Initially, I had hoped to have depicted popular culture's ideas on achievement and success in an ironic and humorous fashion. However, over the past year, the work has taken on a more serious tone as I illustrate more about the thoughts and ideas we all deal with in our contemporary society. The work has evolved into developing a consistent character and creating an environment in which the interaction between the two, brings in the viewer. This approach seems to allow the audience an opportunity to relate to the work in a very personal manner. While not everyone wears a suit, I feel the themes transcend to the everyman.

Rennert begins his pieces with a steel armature or framework around which he forms clay. He then makes adjustments to the piece for weight, proportion, and to express motion. From this, he creates a silicone and plaster mould which is then used to make a ceramic mould into which molten bronze will be poured. The final pieces are then produced using a combination of bronze, cast through the ancient lost-wax method, and flat pieces of laser-cut steel. Rennert's works are cast at the Adonis Bronze Foundry in Alpine, Utah.

Rennert's influences include Richard Serra (Rennert states, "He tried to change the environment that people experienced."), Robert Longo, and William McElchern.

In an essay examining Rennert's earlier pieces, American Art critic Carter Ratcliff compared Rennert's body of work to classic masterpieces, such as the Discobulus of Myron and the Pancrastinae:

This reading would require us to rethink our definition of Rennert's art. Is he, after all, an exclusively figurative sculptor? The question requires us to step back for a view of sculpture's evolution over the centuries. Only then will we be able to see exactly where Rennert stands.

The history of any medium is of course extremely complex, reaching over long stretches of time and wide expanses of geography. An effigy of Athena in a Grecian temple stands at quite a distance from an equestrian statue in New York's Central Park. Nonetheless, there is a clear continuum to be traced from idealized images of ancient gods and goddesses to realistic portraits in bronze and marble. But where in this line of development are we to place the abstract sculpture that began to appear in the early decades of the twentieth century? There are, in fact, two continuums—one that leads representational sculpture from the ideal to the real and another that begins with figurative imagery and ends with the non-figurative forms of sculptors as different as the Dadaist Hans Arp and the Minimalists. Rennert, as we'll see, has a place on both continuums.

The resolved poses and refined anatomies of the Discobolus and The Wrestlers are signs of a yearning for perfection so absolute that we might call it transcendent. Perfect proportion, perfect composition, perfect surface—these were the goals of ancient Greek sculptors, whether they were depicting gods or humans. It is as if they didn’t consider a subject worthy of representation unless it could be given attributes suitable for the divine. This is the idealism at the origin of Western art and, as alien as it may seem to us, with our concern for down-to-earth realities, it persists even now, if only in attenuated form—as a look at the geometry of Minimalist form will show.

=== Exhibition history ===
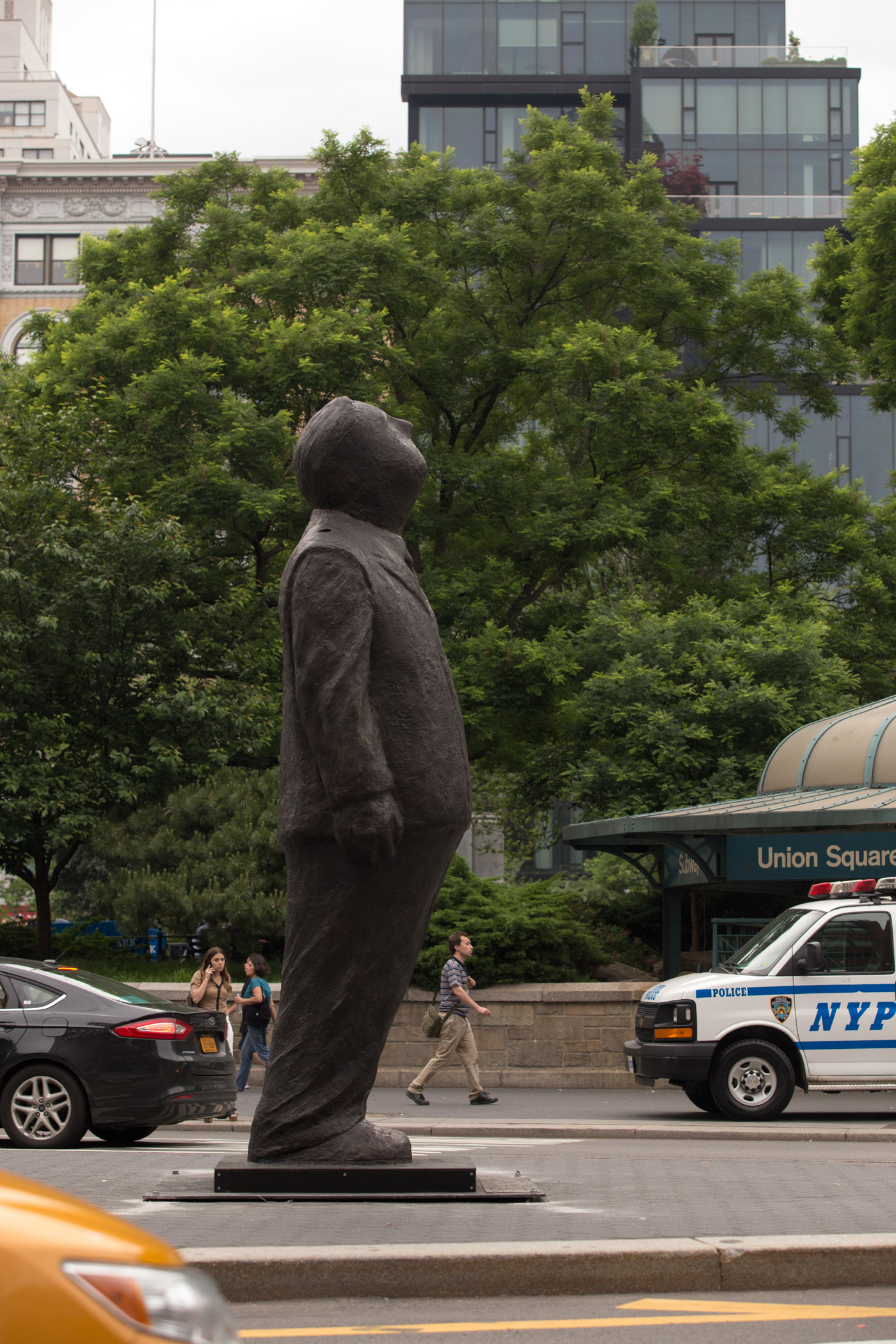
Think Big in Union Square in 2014.

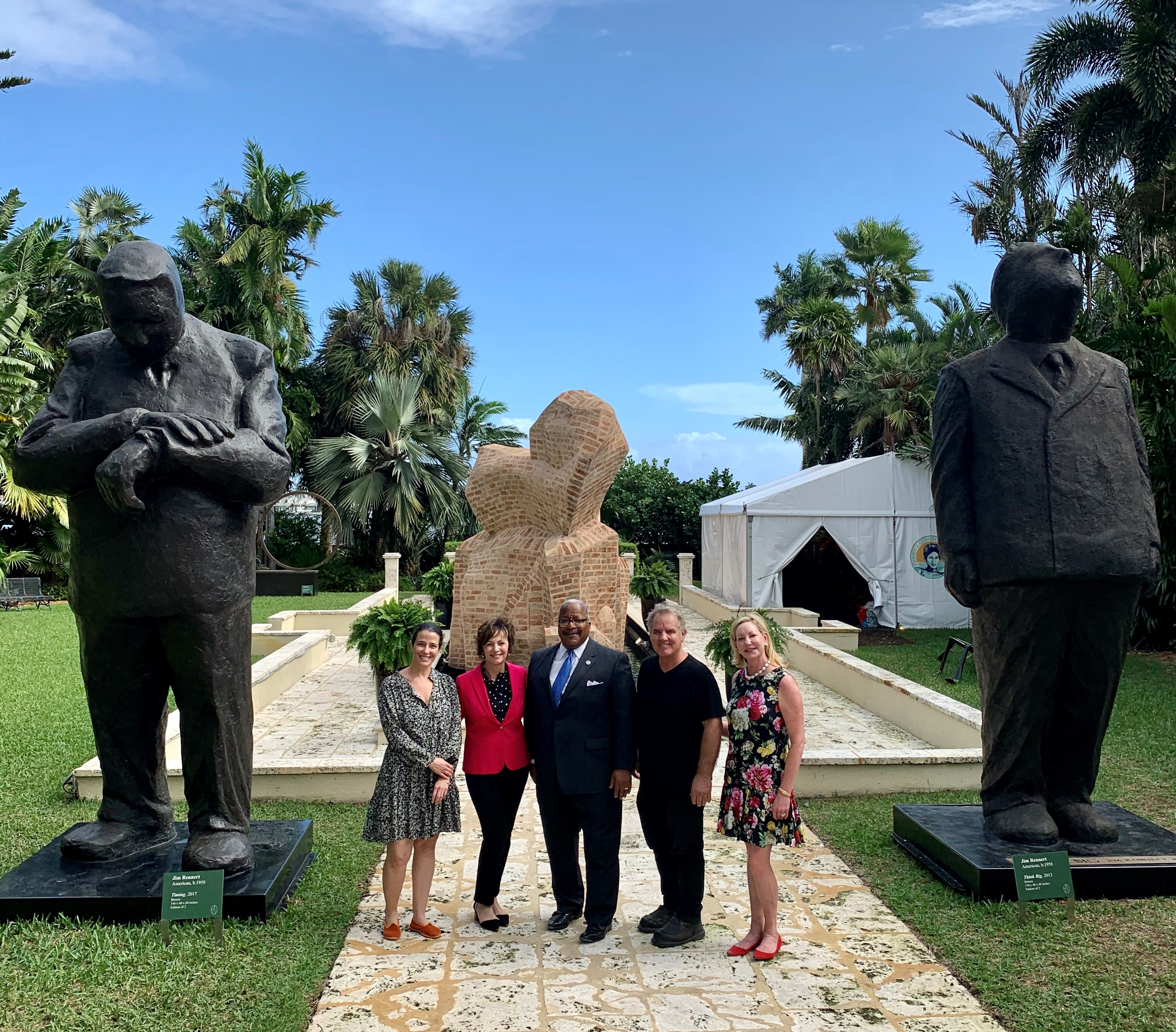
Jim Rennert in 2020 at Jim Rennert: With These Hands with West Palm Beach Mayor, Keith James and others responsible for the exhibition. Rennert's Timing is shown at left and Think Big at right.

Rennert regularly exhibits his work at large US art fairs, in addition to galleries in New York, Utah, Massachusetts, Connecticut, New Mexico, Maine, Colorado, British Columbia, and Florida. His works may be found in private and corporate collections worldwide, including a life-size commission of Steadfast for Caruso in the Pacific Palisades, Los Angeles, Entrepreneur at the Nemacolin Woodlands Resort, and multiple sculptures in Naples, Florida.

Between June 2014 and May 2015, Rennert's Think Big sculpture was put on public display in New York City's Union Square. Think Big has been considered the "vital heart" of Rennert's works. In 2019, Rennert's Listen was installed at West 55th Street and Sixth Avenue in place of Robert Indiana's Love sculpture. As of January 25, 2020, Rennert's first multi-work exhibition of large-scale sculptures, Jim Rennert: With These Hands is on display at the Ann Norton Sculpture Garden. A book of the same name, cataloguing the full body of Rennert's work, accompanies the exhibition.

Along with his public exhibitions and exhibitions at art fairs, Rennert has exhibited regularly with Cavalier Galleries since 2005.

==== Selected exhibitions ====
- Cavalier Gallery, New York State of Mind, Mar – Apr 2020, Digital Exhibition
- Ann Norton Sculpture Garden, Jim Rennert: With These Hands, Jan 2020 – ongoing, New York, NY
- Listen on Sixth Avenue, Oct 2019 – ongoing, New York, NY
- It’s Happening! Celebrating 50 Years of Public Art in NYC Parks, Oct 2017, New York, NY
- New York Art, Antique & Jewelry Show, Nov 2016, New York, NY
- Cavalier Galleries, Cavalier Galleries 30th Anniversary Exhibition, Nov 2016, New York, NY
- THINK BIG by Jim Rennert, Public Exhibition, Union Square, Jun 2014 – May 2015, New York, NY
- Perspective by Jim Rennert, Public Exhibition, Union Square, Jun 2014 – May 2015, New York, NY
- Cavalier Galleries, Jim Rennert: Sculpture Exhibition, Jun 2014, New York, NY
- The Englishman Presents Jim Rennert, Feb 2014, Naples, FL
- Antiques & Art at the Armory, March 2011, New York, NY
- Three Americans: Berger, Kahn and Rennert, Coral Springs Museum, Oct 2010, Coral Springs, FL
- 77th Annual Awards Exhibition, National Sculpture Society, 2010, Brookgreen, SC
- Art Hamptons, 2010, Bridgehampton, NY
- Art Hamptons, July 2009 Long Island, NY
- Public Art Installation, Oct 2008 Palm Desert, CA
- 75th Annual Awards Exhibition, National Sculpture Society, Feb 2008, New York, NY
- Art Around the Corner, Spring, 2008, St George, UT
- Sculpture in the Park, Aug 2007, Loveland, CO
- Art Around the Corner, 2007, St. George, UT
- 20th Anniversary Show, Cavalier Galleries, 2006, Greenwich, CT
- Sculpture in the Park, 2006, Loveland, CO
- Kimball Museum Arts Festival, 2006, Park City, UT
- Artfest, 2006, Dallas, TX
- Art Around the Corner, 2006, St. George, Utah
- St. George Arts Festival, 2006, St. George, UT
- International Show, The Fairview Museum of History and Art, 2006, Fairview, UT
- Allied Artists of America, 2005, New York City, NY
- Cavalier Galleries, Contemporary Realism, 2005, New York City, NY (Rennert's first exhibition with his representative gallery)
- Kimball Museum Arts Festival, 2005, Park City, UT
- St. George Arts Festival, 2005, St George UT
- Springville Museum Spring Salon, 2005 Springville, UT
- 3W Gallery One Man Show, 2003 Salt Lake City, UT
- Boise Art in the Park, 1997, Boise, ID
- Kimball Museum Arts Festival, 1996, Park City, UT
- Boise Art in the Park, 1996, Boise, ID

== Bibliography ==
=== Further reading ===
- Sculpture Review, Sculpture in Social Dialogue, 2015
- ArtNerd New York, Relive Your Big City Dreams With Think Big by Jim Rennert in Union Square, 2014
- This Week in New York, Jim Rennert: Think Big/Perspective, 2014
- DNA Info, 12-Foot Businessman Sculpture Rises in Union Square, New York, 2014
- ABC 7 Eyewitness News, “Think Big” Sculpture Hopes to Inspire New Yorkers, New York, 2013
- Sculptors of the Rockies, 2010
- Sculptural Review Spring 2009
- American Art Collector Feb 2009
- Southwest Art Magazine, July 2008
- American Art Collector, Feb 2008
- Santa Fe Focus Magazine, "The Art of the Deal" Oct 2007
- American Art Collector, “Working 9–5” July 2007
- KUTV Channel 2 News, “Art of the Deal” Sept 2006
- Sculptural Pursuit Magazine, Jan 2006
- Utah Homes and Garden, Winter 2001–02
- Salt Lake City Tribune, 2000
- Park Record, 1996
