= Winslow Homer Studio =

- U.S. National Register of Historic Places
- U.S. National Historic Landmark
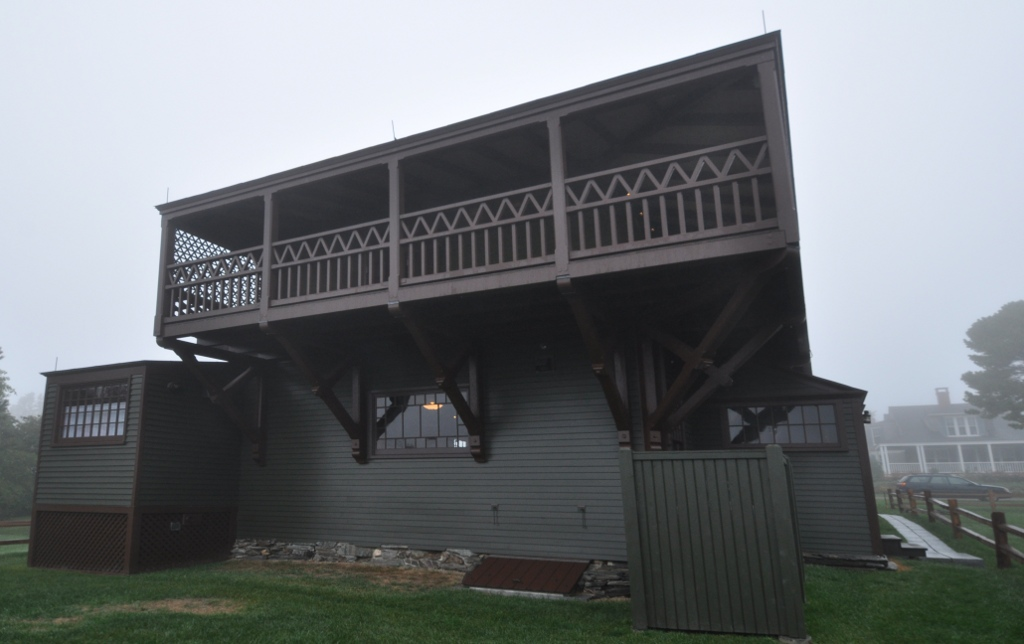

- Location within Maine Location within the United States
- Location: Winslow Homer Road, Scarborough, Maine
- Coordinates: 43°31′42″N 70°19′13″W
- Built: 1884
- Architect: John Calvin Stevens
- Architectural style: Shingle Style
- NRHP reference No.: 66000092

Significant dates
- Added to NRHP: October 15, 1966
- Designated NHL: December 21, 1965

The Winslow Homer Studio is the historic studio and home of the artist Winslow Homer, which is located on what is now Winslow Homer Road on Prouts Neck in Scarborough, Maine. Maine architect John Calvin Stevens altered and expanded an existing carriage house to suit Homer's needs in 1884, even moving the building 100 feet for added privacy from his brother's neighboring summer home. The most dramatic element is a balcony the width of the building, from which the artist often painted in winter. The building is 44 by 53 feet (13 m × 16 m) and two stories high, for a total of 2,200 square feet (200 m^{2}). Homer lived and painted in the studio from 1884 until his death there in 1910.

The studio was declared a National Historic Landmark in 1965.

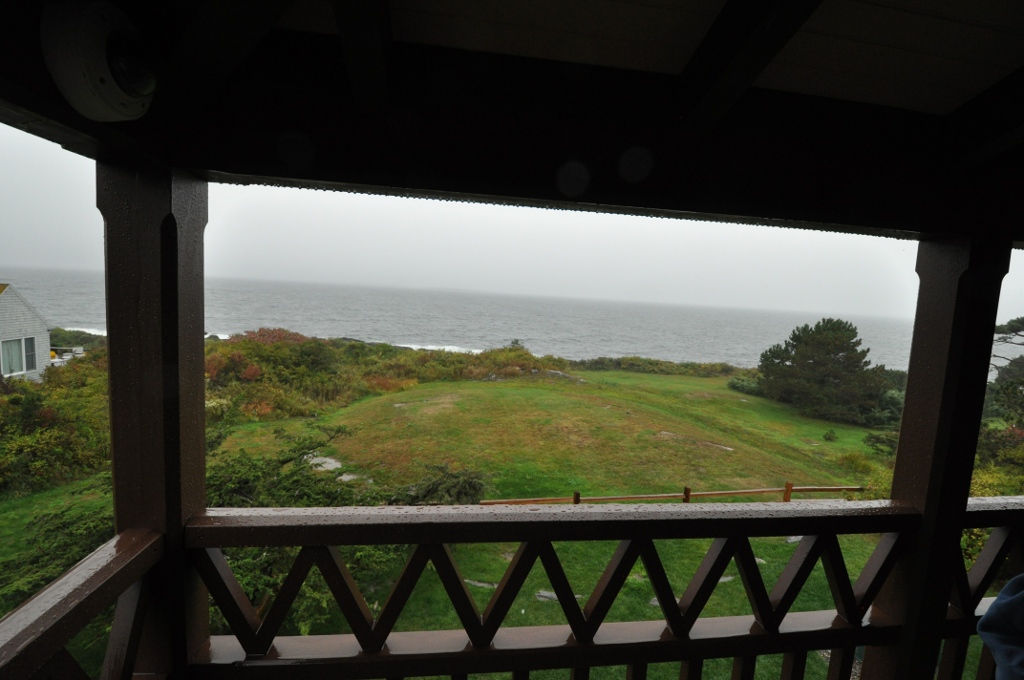
View of the sea, visible from the balcony

The Portland Museum of Art acquired the building and surrounding grounds on January 31, 2006, closing both to the public during restoration projects. It was opened to the public in 2012, but may only be visited on a guided tour. The Portland Museum of Art undertook significant restoration of the building. Changes and additions made by members of the Homer family in 1938–39 were undone in order to preserve the studio as Winslow Homer left it in 1910. Some updates were also made to the property to enable it to function as a museum exhibit. The additions included plumbing and a restroom for visitors, electricity, security, and hidden steel reinforcements for the balcony (or piazza).

== See also ==
- List of National Historic Landmarks in Maine
- National Register of Historic Places listings in Cumberland County, Maine
- List of Historic Artists' Homes and Studios Sites
- List of paintings by Winslow Homer
