= Norton House (West Palm Beach, Florida) =

Historic house in Florida, United States

- Ann Norton Sculpture Gardens
- U.S. National Register of Historic Places
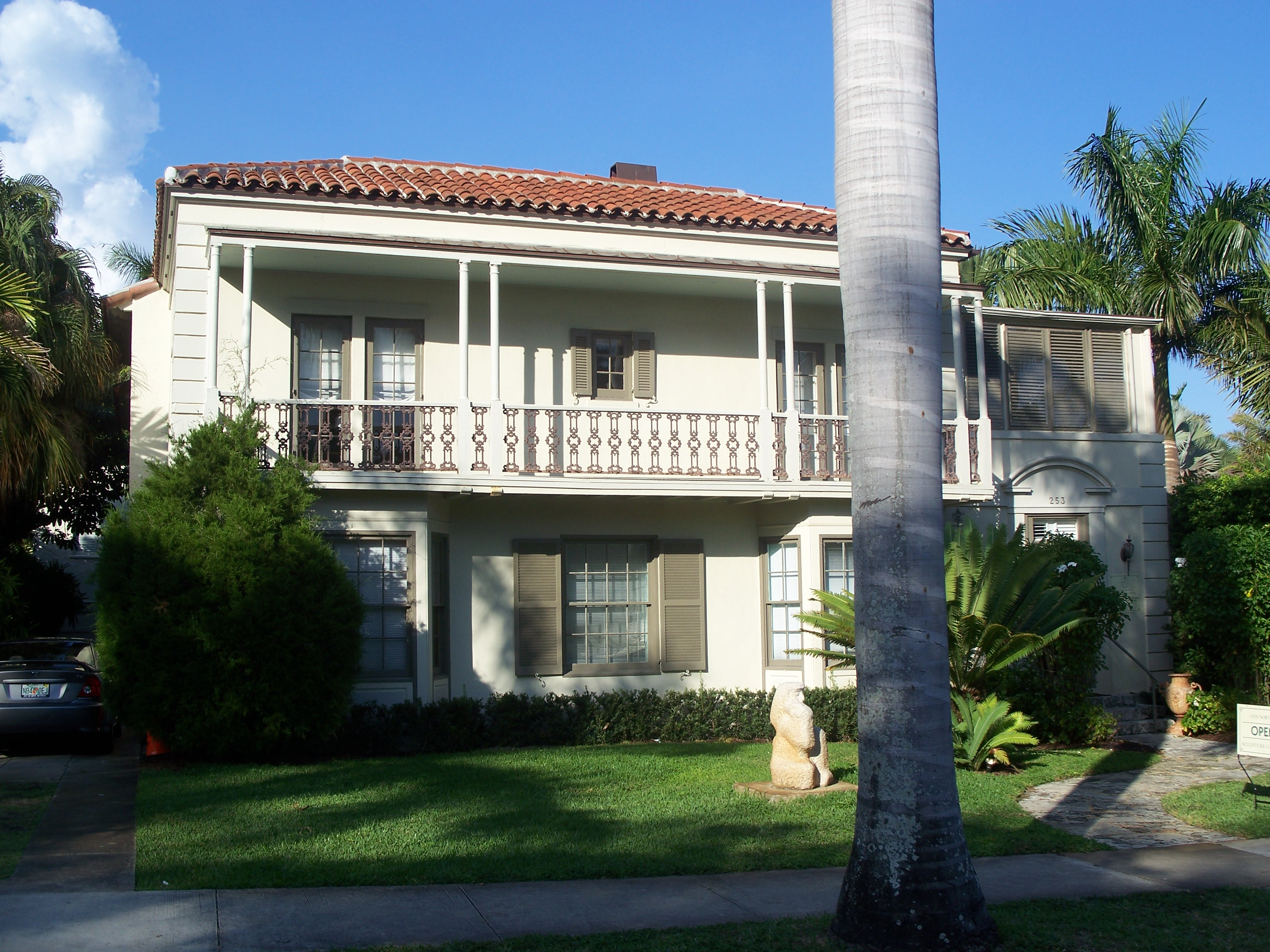

- Location within Florida Location within the United States
- Interactive map showing the location of Norton House
- Location: 253 Barcelona Rd., West Palm Beach, Florida
- Coordinates: 26°41′42″N 80°3′3″W
- Built: 1925
- Architect: Marion Sims Wyeth
- Architectural style: Modern Movement, Monterey Style
- Part of: El Cid Historic District (ID95001064)
- NRHP reference No.: 90001106 (original); 100011643 (increase)

Significant dates
- Added to NRHP: July 26, 1990
- Boundary increase: April 11, 2025

The Norton House is a historic home located at 253 Barcelona Road in West Palm Beach, Florida. On July 26, 1990, the house was added to the U.S. National Register of Historic Places, with a boundary increase in 2025 to include the sculpture gardens. It is also a contributing property to the El Cid Historic District. Constructed in 1925 and designed by Maurice Fatio, the two-story home was originally a Mediterranean revival-style architecture.

After Ralph Hubbard Norton (1875–1953), founder of the Norton Museum of Art, bought the residence in 1935, Marion Sims Wyeth converted the dwelling to the Modern Movement and Monterey styles of architecture. The Ann Norton Sculpture Gardens consists of the Norton House and approximately 2-acre (8,100 m^{2}) of property, and features over 100 sculptures by Ann Weaver Norton (1905–1982), the second wife and widow of Ralph Hubbard Norton. The sculptures are displayed in the house, studio and gardens, which feature over 300 species of tropical palms.

== History and description ==
The Norton House was built in 1925 at 253 Barcelona Road in the El Cid neighborhood of West Palm Beach, Florida, named after Ann Weaver Norton and Ralph Hubbard Norton. A couple who married in 1948, Ann was a sculptor and children's book author, while Ralph and his first wife (Elizabeth Calhoun Norton) later founded the Norton Gallery and School of Art (later the Norton Museum of Art) in 1941. Maurice Fatio designed the residence, a two-story structure originally of Mediterranean revival-style architecture. Although Vicki L. Cole of the Florida Bureau of Historic Preservation describes Ralph Norton as the second owner of the residence, J. T. Milliken Jr. and his wife lived there in 1930, while Mrs. J. C. Wagen also did later that year. Additionally, Rose Letitia McDonald sold the home to Edward Card in 1932, about one year after buying it. Card's two sons and a grandson then inherited the house in 1934.

Around March 1935, the estate of Card sold the home and its 225 feet (69 m) frontage on Barcelona and 125 feet (38 m) on the Lake Worth Lagoon to Acme Steel company executive Ralph Hubbard Norton for roughly $20,000. Norton intended to renovate the property and soon hired Marion Sims Wyeth, an architect whose most notable works include Mar-a-Lago (along with Joseph Urban) in the 1920s and the Florida Governor's Mansion in 1955, to modify the design of the Norton House. Wyeth converted the residence into a Modern Movement and Monterey-style structure. Ralph Hubbard Norton perished in 1953.

Five years before Ann Weaver Norton's death, she established the Ann Norton Sculpture Gardens in 1977, which features more than 100 of her sculptures. The sculptures are displayed in the house, studio and gardens, which feature over 300 species of tropical palms. Sir Peter Smithers designed the garden itself. Overall, the home, sculpture gardens, and two other structures sit on a property spanning about 2 acres (0.81 ha). On July 26, 1990, the Norton House was listed on the National Register of Historic Places (NRHP). Later, on April 11, 2025, the NRHP designation boundaries were expanded to include the sculpture gardens and renamed the Ann Norton House and Sculpture Gardens. That same year, the Ann Norton Sculpture Gardens completed a 10-year restoration project, costing approximately $10 million.

== See also ==
- National Register of Historic Places listings in Palm Beach County, Florida
