= Mountain dog =

Dog type

Mountain dog is a term used in some English-language names of some breeds and regional varieties of dog, all livestock guardian types.

== See also ==
- Dog Mountain (disambiguation)
