= Ann Weaver Norton =

American sculptor (1905–1982)

- Born: Ann Weaver; May 2, 1905; Selma, Alabama, U.S.
- Died: February 2, 1982 (aged 76)
- Burial place: Old Live Oak Cemetery
- Occupations: Sculptor, educator, writer of children's books
- Spouse: Ralph Hubbard Norton
- Relatives: Clara Weaver Parrish (aunt)

Ann Weaver Norton (née Ann Weaver; May 2, 1905 – February 2, 1982) was an American sculptor, educator, and writer of children's books.

== Early life and education ==
Norton was born in Selma, Alabama, the daughter of William Minter Weaver II and Edith Vaughan Weaver. She showed early talent for art, most likely influenced by her two aunts, Clara Weaver Parrish and Rose Pettus Weaver, who were artists themselves. Weaver Parrish had studied at the Art Students League in New York City under William Merritt Chase, exhibited at the Paris Exposition in 1900 and worked with stained glass at the Tiffany Studios. She later returned to Alabama, organizing exhibitions of southern women artists. Rose Weaver most likely studied in New York as well, and had a career as a sculptor in wood.

After graduating from high school, in an attempt to earn money to attend art school Ann Norton wrote and illustrated three children's books – Frawg (1930), Boochy's Wings (1931), and Pappy King (1932) – while vacationing at the family summer home near Sardis. She attended Smith College. In her senior year, Norton was elected to Phi Beta Kappa and graduated magna cum laude in 1927.

In 1928, Norton was admitted to the National Academy of Design. She attended classes there for three years, studying under Charles Louis Hinton, Alice Harold Murphy, Leon Kroll, Carl Thomas Anderson, and Charles Keck. She held two scholarships during this time, which were obtained by passing certain examinations. During the summers she took classes at the Grand Central School of Art from George John Lober. In the spring of 1930, Norton attended the Art Students League of New York, studying under Homer Boss. In 1932, she was admitted to Cooper Union where the education was free but admission competitive, and studied sculpture for three and a half years under Charles Rudy. At Cooper Union, Norton won numerous awards in figure modeling and sculpture composition. She also was awarded two traveling fellowships - an Art and Archeology Scholarship from the Institute for International Education and another fellowship to study garden sculpture in Italy and England. When she returned to the States, Norton sought out a few sculptors whose work reflected her developing style. One was John Hovannes, who taught at the Art Students League and Cooper Union. Another was Alexander Archipenko, a sculptor who had been part of an artists' group in Paris called Section d'Or, which included Pablo Picasso, Juan Gris, Georges Braque and others. In all, Norton spent five years as an apprentice under Archipenko and Hovannes, among others. She received Carnegie Traveling Fellowships in 1935 and 1940.

== Career ==
In the 1930s, views on art were changing radically. A new generation that came of age after the first world war were questioning the validity of the traditional institutions of culture and aesthetics. A show at the Museum of Modern Art (MOMA) in 1929 featured works by Picasso, Matisse and Braque among many other European artists who were exploring new techniques of cubism and abstraction. In sculpture, the traditional method of starting with a model and then hiring a craftsman to create the sculpture was shifting in some circles to the method of "direct carving". This was a process by which artists used their own chisel and mallet to create their works. Constantin Brâncuși was a leading proponent of this process; other sculptors practicing this method were William Zorach and Archipenko. Using this process, their sculpture took on a more abstracted, non-literal representation. Norton greatly admired these sculptors, and her drawings at the time show a shift towards more abstract and simple lines. While her sculptures at the time demonstrate a continued interest in figurative art, the subject matter shifted from the traditional focus on heroic figures to real people living everyday lives.

Norton was having some success in her field during this time. She showed Negro Head at MOMA in 1930; she was included in a book Art in America in Modern Times, published in 1934, as one of 20 women "doing very good work"; and she exhibited at a group show at the Jacques Seligmann Galleries in 1934, the Clay Club Galleries in 1939, the National Sculpture Society in 1940, and the Whitney Museum in 1941. Through her interest in making garden sculpture, most likely influenced by her traveling fellowship in Italy and England, she received a commission in 1939 for a statue of St. Francis for a private garden. Apparently it was a success, as she received a glowing letter from the owner for her skill.

However, other commissions were not forthcoming, and despite her successes, Norton realized she needed to find alternate means of financial support, and turned to teaching. She applied and was accepted for a position teaching sculpture at the Norton Gallery and School of Art in West Palm Beach, Florida, starting in early 1943. With this additional income, Norton was able to work with the Anton Basky Foundation in New York City to cast some of her modeled work, including a major series called Casualties, with four bronze sculptures, produced between 1944 and 1947. Several more sculptures were created in the late 1940s, portraying everyday subject matter such as people cutting hair, children pumping water, kneeling figures and others.

A number of collectors in Palm Beach began to take notice of Norton's work and purchased several sculptures. In addition, the director of the Norton Gallery, Robert Hunter, bought two pieces -- Beauty Parlor in 1946 and Machine II in 1947.

Through her teaching at the Norton Gallery, she became acquainted with the founder of the Norton Gallery, Ralph Hubbard Norton. Mr. Norton had been president and later chair of the board of the Acme Steel Company, becoming a major art collector as well. In 1935, he and his first wife, Elizabeth Calhoun Norton, moved to Florida for the winter months, and, working with noted architect Marion Sims Wyeth, he created the Norton Gallery in order to display his works. He also wanted his new institution to be an educational and cultural center, so created an art school, situated adjacent to the Gallery.

As Ann Weaver settled into her teaching role, she and Ralph Norton corresponded periodically about art and developed a friendly relationship. Following the death of Elizabeth Norton in 1947, Ralph Norton asked Ann Weaver to marry him and they married in 1948. Once married, Ann Norton stopped teaching so that she could focus on her work. She exhibited Jitterbug Dancers at the Pennsylvania Academy of Fine Arts' (PAFA) annual show in 1950. Between 1949 and 1950 she made two bronze casts of Machine IV, three casts of Seated Figure 1 and 2 and a marble Mother and Child. Ralph Norton built a studio for Ann behind the house they lived in at 253 Barcelona Road, West Palm Beach, a few blocks from the Norton Gallery.

After just five years of marriage, Ralph Norton died in December, 1953. In the years following his death, Ann Norton began practicing a new form of sculpture—the field of monumental sculpture, influenced by her travels to the west, where she was captivated by the color palette and powerful rock formations which to Ann resembled thousands of figures eroded in the rock Upon her return, she began work on a grouping of seven figures as a memorial to her husband, the tallest of which was to be twelve feet high, carved in pink Norwegian granite. It proved to be an immensely difficult undertaking, taking ten years to finish. It also led to difficulties with the Norton Gallery, in that they had anticipated a modest memorial that she had originally proposed and didn't believe a memorial of that size would work on the grounds of the Gallery. So the sculpture ended up in Norton's gardens behind her house on Barcelona Street.

Following travel to India, Norton's work moved fully into abstraction. She focused on a new material - heart cedar from the Pacific Northwest, a material found in Tibetan temples as well as the totem poles of the Native Americans of the Northwest. She created hundreds of pastel and charcoal sketches, leading to the wooded sculptures of the 1970s calling them Gateways.

She then turned to her last new material - brick. Using a rare pink Mexican brick, she created a giant sculpture, forty-seven feet long, creating an abstraction reminiscent of a mountain range or sea creature. Later, she created seven vertical monolithic sculptures. They were made of red, handmade North Carolina brick, twenty feet high, created for her garden, well placed to appear suddenly, behind dense foliage.

She also had a series of solo works of her art in the 60s and 70s. In 1968, she had solo exhibitions at the Bodley Gallery in New York. Her first was called Theme and Variations and featured thirty two bronze and brass cast sculptures. The second show was entitled Demons, Magicians and Others, showing maquettes of the seven figure grouping in her garden, with photographs of the actual sculpture.

In 1969, Ann's works was finally shown at the Norton Gallery of Art, featuring her brass and bronze torsos. She had a solo exhibition at the Galerie Juarez in Palm Beach in 1972-3 and 1974. The Musee Rodin in Paris included one of her torsos in its exhibition La Forme Humaine. In 1980, the Max Hutchinson Gallery held an exhibition of her cedar Gateways to great acclaim.

During this period, Norton kept working on her two-acre site, taking down trees, and planting native trees. In early 1977, she was diagnosed with leukemia, which led her to focus more fully on the future. She wished to create a foundation - a "garden museum" - a mix of sculpture with trees, bushes, water and wildflowers, as well as space for exhibitions and symposiums. In 1980, an announcement was made of the creation of the Ann Norton Sculpture Gardens. The concept was further enriched by Sir Peter Smithers, a distinguished British politician and garden designer, who Ann had met. She invited him to her gardens and asked him to redesign them. He developed an overall plan that incorporated a number of rare palms, creating a dense landscape that would provide the "hide and reveal" concept that Norton envisioned.

== Death and legacy ==
Ann died in 1982. She was buried at Live Oak Cemetery in Selma. After her death, the Norton Gallery of Art presented a major retrospective of her work in 1983. Several exhibitions of her works were held in subsequent years.

Norton was the subject of a biography, Monumental Dreams: The Life and Sculpture of Ann Norton, published in 2014.

Norton was known for her "megalith" sculptures, vertical constructions of handmade bricks or wood. Over 100 of these works are displayed at the Ann Norton Sculpture Gardens on the grounds of her former home in West Palm Beach. Besides the Ann Norton Sculpture Gardens, other collections which own examples of her work include the Detroit Institute of Art, the Los Angeles County Museum of Art, the High Museum of Art, and the Musée Rodin. In addition, the Norton Museum of Art owns four examples of her work - Seated Figure, Casualties IV, Draped Figure, and Haircutting.
