= Victor D'Amico =

American artist (1904–1987)

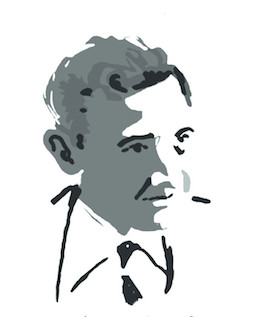
- Drawing of D'Amico, by Sara Torres Vega
- Born: Victor Edmond D'Amico; May 19, 1904; New York City, New York, U.S.
- Died: April 1, 1987 (aged 82); Southampton, New York, U.S.
- Resting place: East Hampton, New York, U.S.
- Education: Cooper Union; Pratt Institute; Columbia University
- Known for: Founding Director of the Department of Education at the Museum of Modern Art
- Notable work: Creative Teaching in Art (1942); How to Make Pottery and Ceramic Sculpture (with Julia Hamlin Duncan) (1947); Art for the Family (with Moreen Maser & Frances Wilson) (1954); Experiments in Creative Art Teaching (1960); The Art of Assemblage (with Arlette Buchman) (1970)
- Movement: Modern Art, Progressive Education, Social Reconstructionism
- Spouse(s): Mabel Ellet Macxy, Mabel Birckhead D'Amico

Victor Edmond D'Amico (May 19, 1904 – April 1, 1987) was an American teaching artist and the founding Director of the Department of Education of the Museum of Modern Art, New York. D’Amico explored the essence of the art experience and the ability to communicate one's most profound ideas and emotions through aesthetic expression. He considered that the individual's personality had to be respected and developed by providing opportunities for creative experimentation. D'Amico's philosophy was based on the fundamental belief in the creative potential in every man, woman and child. He believed "that the arts are a humanizing force and their major function is to vitalize the living."

Recognizing learning as a process that is unique in each individual, D'Amico embraced the different ways in which each person's experience, ability and perception require a different approach to teaching. Teaching by this process, according to D'Amico, meant that the teacher must be constantly sensitive to the needs of each individual so as to stimulate and satisfy emerging interests. Victor D'Amico was not only a remarkable artist and teacher, but also a visionary and pioneer of modern art education.

== Early life and education ==
Victor D’Amico was born on May 19, 1904, in New York City. D’Amico was one of the eleven children (seven boys and four girls) born to Concetta Paula (Jennie) Vitale and Domenico Emilio D’Amico. Victor D’Amico's mother and father were born in Italy. Concetta arrived to the United States when she was one year old while Domenico emigrated to the United States when he was nineteen.

Victor D’Amico spent his childhood in Manhattan, Queens and the Bronx (New York City); and Cuyahoga in Cleveland (Ohio).

Victor attended the Cooper Union, studying fine arts, illustration, and costume design (1920–1922); Pratt Institute, studying art education (1924–1926) and Teachers College Columbia University (1926–1930) where he earned his B. S. and M.S. D’Amico also studied and worked with Norman Bel Geddes (1928–1929).

While studying at Teachers’ College, D’Amico was hired as art teacher and Head of the Art Department of the Fieldston Schools, Riverdale, NYC from 1926 to 1948. While working at Fieldston, D’Amico joined MoMA part-time as director of the Educational Project in 1937.

== Career ==
In 1948 D’Amico started working full-time at MoMA as Director of the Education Department and remained in the post until he retired in 1969. At MoMA, D’Amico created and directed the Young People's Gallery, the Children's Art Carnival (in New York, Italy, Spain, Belgium, India and Harlem), the Committee on Art Education, the Veterans Art Center, The People's Art Center and the Napeague Institute of Art best known as the Art Barge. D’Amico also produced Through the Enchanted Gate, a NBC television program presented in 1952 and 1953.

D’Amico's most significant writings include Theatre Arts, Visual Arts in General Education, Creative Teaching in Art, How to Make Pottery and Ceramic Sculpture, How to Make Modern Jewelry, How to Make Objects of Wood, Art for the Family, Experiments in Creative Art Teaching, Found Objects, Collage Kit, and The Art of Assemblage. D’Amico authored many research papers published in different journals and lectured widely in the US and abroad.

Following D'Amico's retirement from MoMA, he taught classes for New York City Grade Teachers and created Parent/Child programs at the Metropolitan Museum of Art in NYC and remained as Director of the Napeague Institute of Art, later renamed the Victor D’Amico Institute of Art, a non-profit art education organization on eastern Long Island.

D'Amico was granted the Medal of Honor by The National Gallery of Art, Washington, D. C. for Outstanding Service in the Field of Art Education on March 17, 1966. He received the Honorary Degree of Doctor of Fine Arts by the Philadelphia Museum College of Art on June 8, 1964, and received a Citation of Merit by the State University of New York at Buffalo, April 13, 1964.

Victor D’Amico combined his museum and school work with university and college teaching. He taught art education at Teachers College, Columbia University (1932, 1934–1942), Black Mountain College (1944), the New York University (1965–1972) and Southampton College (1969).

== Personal life and death ==
While teaching art education at Teachers College Columbia University in the 1930s, D’Amico met Mabel Birckhead, a student and an artist/teacher. In 1945 they got married. Victor and Mabel D’Amico lived in the house they built in Lazy Point, Amagansett.

Victor D’Amico died on April 1, 1987, in Amagansett, New York, at the age of 83.

== Art, a Human Necessity ==
D’Amico believed that developing an aesthetic vision and art practice was both personally and collectively enriching, as it allows for a greater appreciation of the natural and built world. Regardless of artistic talent, D’Amico considered that creativity is intrinsic to every individual and should be fostered through art education

D’Amico stressed the importance of discouraging imitation and supporting individual expression. By challenging accepted norms and encouraging unconventional perspectives, D’Amico argued that the value of art making far surpassed that of the final product. It was the process and experience of interacting with art itself that inspired new thought. D’Amico therefore dedicated his life to the creation of programs that allowed children and adults to explore their creative potential and heighten their sensitivity to the artistic potential in everyday life.

The study of modern art was central to D’Amico's educational philosophy. He believed that lived experience was intrinsically linked to modern art. A student's physical environment therefore held an important role in their educational development. D’Amico stressed that through art making, a student would be introduced to elements of design: color, shape and composition that would emerge in everyday objects. The use of motivational toys became integral to his practice. As he notes, “toys have an important place is creative growth of the child...They are his first possessions and the objects of profound interest and affection. Through them he is introduced to the elements of design, texture, pattern, form, color and rhythms as they become the tools of his activity and his imagination.”

D’Amico also explored the role of parents as teachers. In his thirteen-week television series Through the Enchanted Gate (1952–53) and subsequent publication Art for the Family, D’Amico stressed that “all people have creative ability and that anyone at any age can enjoy and develop his aptitudes in art.” Developing the creative interests of his student's parents would help ensure the presence of art in the home and promote a student's individualized tactile development, artistic collaboration, and aesthetic sensitivity.

D’Amico was influenced by John Dewey’s experience-based pedagogy and utilized environment to stimulate creativity. In turn, he often took an experimental style approach to learning. D’Amico promoted engagement and interactivity in many of his museum programs and exhibitions. From the Children’s Art Carnival, which promoted play as a form of motivation, to the Young People’s Gallery, which gave high school students the rare experience of curating an exhibition, D’Amico expanded the boundaries of the classroom.

== MoMA Education ==
For more than three decades (1937–1969), D’Amico served as the Director of MoMA’s Education Department. D’Amico's programs included: the Young People’s Gallery, the National Committee on Art Education, The War Veterans’ Art Center, the People's Art Center, the Children's Art Carnival, and Classes for Parents and Children.

=== The New York City High School Program ===
The program for the New York City High Schools began at the Museum of Modern Art in 1937 as a privately financed experiment involving the participation of twelve schools and The Museum of Modern Art. It included exhibitions sent to schools and a Young People's Gallery at the Museum containing exhibitions designed for and by young people. After the first two-year pilot, this program expanded through the funding of the Museum and the Board of Education. Schools were supplied with more than 100 visual aids, including exhibitions, slide talks, teaching models, teaching portfolios and films, which were seen by more than 350,000 school children each year. Exhibits, libraries of color reproductions, museum books which students could borrow and take home, teaching portfolios designed for classroom use and art films were among the materials that circulated. "The record of this program," Victor D'Amico said, "and the exhibitions are a tribute to the Board of Education teachers whose interest sustained the program and whose cooperation with the Museum over the years has been an adventure." Olive Reilly, Director of Art of the Board of Education, called the program "an outstanding example of the fine contribution that a museum, through its educational department, can make to public school education."

=== The Young People's Gallery ===
The Young People's Gallery was opened under the direction of Victor D’Amico on December 1, 1937. The Young People's Gallery was an “educational experiment” with the intent of making the Museum's collection more accessible to New York public and private schools. All exhibitions shown in the Young People's Gallery were selected for, or by, pupils in the art classes of secondary schools. Student juries composed of delegates from all the schools selected and hung the exhibitions. The project sought to give students a hands-on experience curating and producing art exhibitions.

Victor D'Amico designed special equipment in the Young People's gallery so that it served both as gallery and art studio. This included community easels, a continuous chain of desks folded flat against two of the walls and a large screen that covered an entire wall of the gallery that could be opened to form narrow drop shelves on which paintings may be stood and easily removed to make way for more paintings during demonstrations and lectures to classes.

=== The Children's Art Carnival ===
In 1942, D’Amico founded the widely acclaimed Children's Art Carnival program at the Museum of Modern Art, where it would be presented periodically for over twenty years. D’Amico initially conceived of the Children's Art Carnival as an experiment in art education that would be offered to children throughout New York City. In line with his seminal belief that art education should focus on individual experimentation as opposed to the practice of rote techniques, The Children's Art Carnival fostered an environment in which children were encouraged to make creative decisions. As D’Amico writes in his book, Experiments in Creative Art Teaching, the directive of the Children's Art Carnival was “...to free the child of his clichés or imitative mannerisms and to help him discover his own way of seeing and expressing.” Within each hour-long session, children ranging in age from three to twelve engaged in a series of motivational activities. Aside from the trained teachers, adults were not permitted. The first half of the workshop was for children to interact with a series of motivational toys that encouraged the exploration of line, color, and form that would be stimulate their art making. They were then brought to a studio where they had open access to a variety of mediums and materials. While The Children's Art Carnival encouraged individual expression and exploration, D’Amico stressed the import role of the teacher. As he noted, it is the teacher's responsibility to be sensitive to the needs of their students and create an open environment that both motivates and informs.

The Children's Art Carnival went on to receive international recognition. In 1957, the Museum of Modern Art presented the program at the International Trade Fairs in Milan and Barcelona. The program was then featured in the United States Pavilion at the 1958 Brussels World's Fair in Belgium. In 1962, on behalf of the International Council of The Museum of Modern Art and The Asia Society, First Lady Jacqueline Kennedy presented The Children's Art Carnival to Indira Gandhi as a gift for the National Children's Museum in New Delhi, India. In 1963 the program toured major cities throughout India. In 1969, the Museum of Modern Art sponsored the incorporation of the Children's Art Carnival at The Harlem School of the Arts, where it was free to Harlem residents in Head Start programs, day care centers, public schools and numerous neighborhood organizations.

The Children's Art Carnival was initially financed by the Museum of Modern Art, with subsequent contributions from individuals and foundations, including The Ford Foundation, The New York Times Foundation, The New York Fund for Children, the Van Amerigen Fund, and the Heckscher Foundation for Children. Betty Blayton Taylor served as the Carnival's Executive Director, with the aid of Consulting and Advisory Boards composed of Harlem residents.

=== The National Committee on Art Education ===
The National Committee on Art Education was started in 1942 as an attempt to rebel against the business interests of larger national arts organizations. Chaired by D’Amico and funded by the Museum of Modern Art the committee grew during the first few years to over a thousand members, most of them art professionals. The committee, which met annually, sought to question and transform art education practices of the time (contests, copy books and paint-by-number kits, and teacher training). The Committee on Art Education gathered a range of thinkers, artists and educators including Walter Gropius, Waldo Frank, Hale Woodruff, Viktor Lowenfeld, Belle Boas, Marcel Breuer, Herbert Read, Margaret Mead, Archibald Macleish, Meyer Schapiro, Robert Motherwell and Ben Shahn amongst others as keynote speakers. The committee also organized meetings with artists like Buckminster Fuller, Joan Miró, Martha Graham, Edward Hopper, Georgia O’Keeffe, Alexander Calder, Marc Chagall, William Zorach, Jacques Lipchitz, José De Creeft and Henri Cartier-Bresson amongst others.

Labelling itself as “an avant-garde group,” the committee came into the public eye because of its noted affiliates and associations with MoMA.

=== The War Veteran's Art Center ===
The Museum of Modern Art's Armed Services Program, established during World War II, supplied art materials to men and women in uniform through the United Service Organization. With the end of the war, the program expanded its offerings at the MoMA. The War Veteran Art Center opened in the summer of 1944 on West Fifty-sixth Street, with additional studio spaces at 681 Fifth Avenue. From 1944 to 1948, the center was devoted exclusively to veterans “to discover the best and the most effective ways of bringing about, through the arts, the readjustment of the veteran to civilian life.” D’Amico insisted on distinguishing the work of the War Veterans’ Art Center from art therapy, with the expectation that veterans would develop their own individual aptitude. The program eventually expanded into the People's Art Center, which accepted non-veterans.

=== The People's Art Center ===
The People's Art Center grew out of the structure and success of the War Veteran's Art Center. It opened in 1948 and offered classes in painting, ceramics, collage, and assemblage. Approximately 800 children and 500 adults attended the classes weekly.

=== Through the Enchanted Gate ===
In 1952 and 1953, MoMA and WNBC-WNBT co-produced a television series called Through the Enchanted Gate created by Victor D’Amico and NBC vice president Ted Cott. Hosted by Ben Grauer and D’Amico himself, the series broadcast art projects and activities that took place at the People's Art Center to a national audience. Instructional pamphlets were available to families to try the exercises at home. Rene d'Harnoncourt, Director of the Museum during the 1950s, felt that "Through the Enchanted Gate points the way to far-reaching possibilities in the Museum's constant aim to extend all its educational opportunities to wider and wider audiences."

=== The Children's Art Caravan ===
Victor D’Amico was intent on expanding the Children's Art Carnival, and in 1969, created The Children's Art Caravan. Financed by a grant from The John D. Rockefeller 3rd Fund, the Caravan consisted of two trailers that were designed as mobile art stations for children whose schools lacked art programs or proper facilities. Continuing in his vision of The Children's Art Carnival as a workshop for teachers as well as children, The Children's Art Caravan included visual aids and texts that would guide the teachers in D’Amico's educational philosophy.

In 1972, the New York Board of Education's Learning Cooperative proposed the prototype of the two-car caravan, created by Victor D’Amico and his wife Mabel, to various school districts, but it was ultimately unable to receive adequate funding.

=== The Kearsarge Art Center, "The Art Barge" ===
In 1955, D’Amico sought to find a permanent location for the art classes that were initially offered by the MoMA at Ashawagh Hall in Springs, New York. In March 1960, with the help of local baymen, D’Amico anchored a WWII Navy barge in Napeague Harbor. A second story was added, creating additional studio space with panoramic views of both Napeague Harbor and the Atlantic Ocean. Originally named Kearsarge, a Native American word meaning “place of heaven,” it was affectionately known as The Art Barge.

== The Victor D'Amico Institute of Art ==
In 1982, The Art Barge was renamed as The Victor D'Amico Institute of Art. It was Directed by Victor D'Amico until he died in 1987. Christopher Kohan is the current president of the Victor D'Amico Institute of Art. The Institution applies D'Amico's ideas to face current challenges in art education. The Institute recognizes the artistic potential within every man, woman, and child. Through weekend workshops, open studio sessions, and evening events, The Art Barge is an accessible art center that prides itself on furthering arts education and reflecting the rich art history of Long Island.

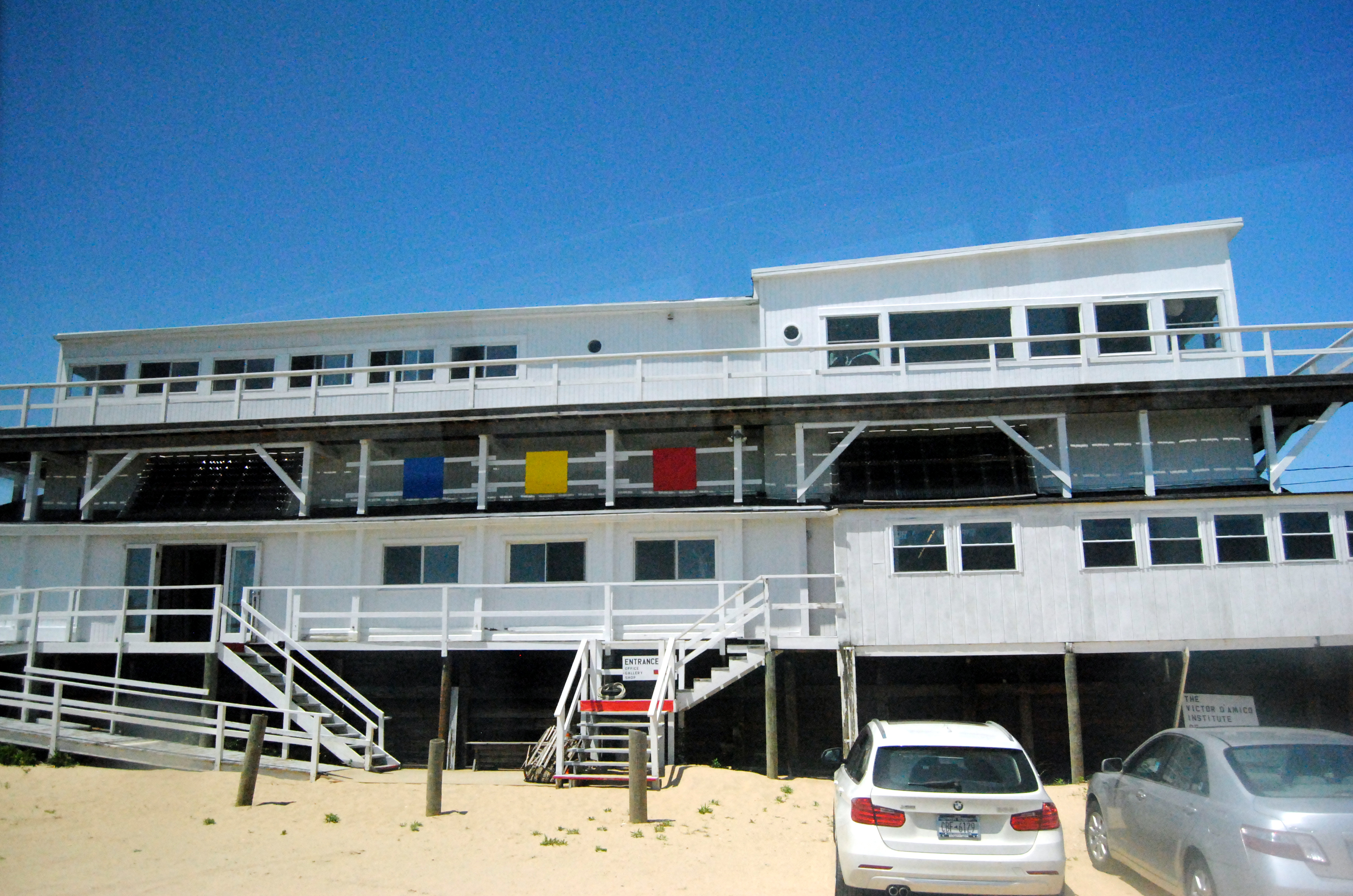
The Victor D'Amico Institute of Modern Art

=== Mabel & Victor D'Amico Studio & Archive ===
Adding to the integrity of The Barge, The Mabel & Victor D’Amico Studio & Archive located in the house that Victor and Mabel D'Amico built comprises a collection of research materials that relate to their teaching and art practice: photos, films, articles, books, motivational materials and artwork. From early modernist architecture and furnishings to found object sculptures and collected items, The House contains objects from the private world of D'Amico and his wife Mabel and is open to the public for tours and private functions throughout the year by appointment only.
