= Ralph Hubbard Norton =

American art collector and museum founder

Ralph Hubbard Norton (1875–1953), born in Chicago, was an art collector and museum founder. Norton's use of an endowment was innovative and novel at the time he set it up to support the museum he established in perpetuity. He was inducted into the Florida Artist Hall of Fame in 1994.

In 1900, he graduated from the University of Chicago. He married Elizabeth Calhoun (1881–1947) of Montgomery, Alabama. He retired as President of Acme Steel in 1940 and moved to West Palm Beach, Florida, opening the Norton Gallery and School of Art (which later became the Norton Museum of Art) in 1941 with pieces from their collection. The museum was designed by Marion Sims Wyeth of Wyeth, King & Johnson with a frieze and two bronze sculptures by Paul Manship.

Norton's second wife was the sculptor Ann Weaver Norton (1905-1982), whose works are displayed in the Norton House in West Palm Beach.
