= Stephen Huneck =

American folk artist (1948–2010)

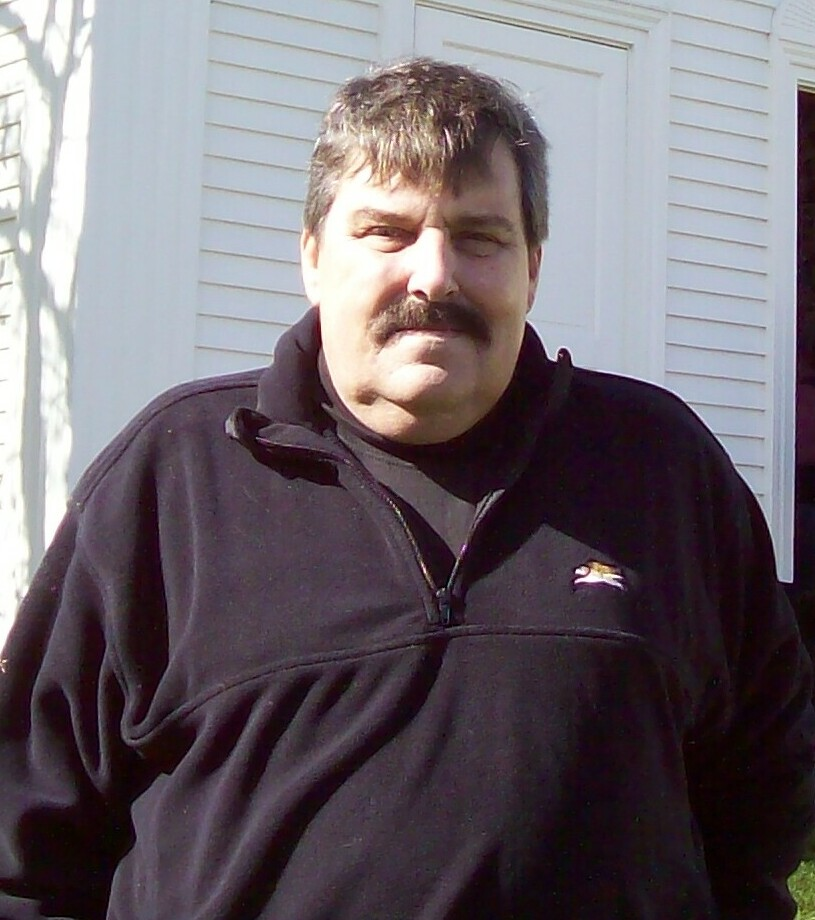
- Stephen Huneck in front of his Dog Chapel in St. Johnsbury, Vermont
- Born: October 8, 1948; Columbus, Ohio, US
- Died: January 7, 2010 (aged 61); Littleton, New Hampshire, US
- Education: Massachusetts College of Art and Design
- Known for: woodcuts, wood carving
- Notable work: The Dog Chapel
- Style: folk art
- Spouse: Gwen Ide (m. 1975)
- Awards: Original Art: Silver Medal; 2002 Sally Goes to the Farm – Society of Illustrators
- Website: www.dogmt.com

Stephen Huneck (pronounced: /ˈstiːvən ˈhjuːnɛk/; October 8, 1948 – January 7, 2010) was an American wood carver and folk artist known for creating Dog Mountain. He also authored a series of children's books featuring Sally, the first of which, Sally Goes to the Beach, was a New York Times best seller.

During his recovery from a serious illness left him in a coma in 1994, Huneck drew support and inspiration from his dogs, in particular his black Labrador Retriever Sally, who was a regular subject for his woodcuts and carvings. The following year, Huneck purchased a mountaintop farmstead in St. Johnsbury, Vermont, renaming the site "Dog Mountain". There he constructed The Dog Chapel, a replica of a traditional New England chapel filled with his carvings and other artwork and dedicated to dogs and other pets. Dog Mountain was home to Huneck's gallery and workshop, as well as was open to the public as a dog park.

After financial difficulties stemming from the Great Recession led Huneck to lay off staff at Dog Mountain, he died by suicide in January 2010.

== Early life and education ==
Huneck was born in Columbus, Ohio, but grew up in Sudbury, Massachusetts, as one of seven children. Huneck had severe dyslexia, but he found calm in exploring the woods near his home and roughly carving bits of fallen branches. After graduating from Lincoln–Sudbury Regional High School, Huneck moved to Boston at age 17 to attend Massachusetts College of Art, working as a taxi cab driver to pay his bills. He also began finding and restoring antique furniture, beginning with an old chair he noticed had been set out for trash collection. Repairing old wooden pieces helped Huneck develop his skill as a carver.

== Career ==
Huneck met fellow student Gwen Ide in Boston. The pair married in 1975 and moved to Vermont, settling at the Quarry Hill Creative Center in Rochester, Vermont. There Huneck began carving wood while continuing to sell antiques. He was discovered in 1984 when Jay Johnson noticed one of his carvings, an angel carved from pine, in Huneck's pick-up truck. Johnson asked Huneck how much he wanted for the angel. Not intending to sell it and believing that the man would not pay such a high price, Huneck told Johnson that he wanted $1,000. Johnson, a Manhattan-based art gallery owner focused on folk art, bought the angel on the spot and then continued to purchase carvings from Huneck.

In 1994, Huneck fell down the stairs at his studio while carrying a large carving, breaking several ribs and suffering a head injury. While in hospital after the fall, he suffered from acute respiratory distress syndrome and ended up in a coma for two months. During his recovery, Huneck found his hands were too weak to carve in his traditional manner, so he began more "gentle" carving, using a mallet and chisel to make woodcuts. The prime subject for these artworks was Sally, Huneck's Labrador Retriever, who, along with his other dogs, helped encourage him in his recovery.

After recovering from the accident, Huneck and his wife purchased the property in St. Johnsbury, Vermont, that would become Dog Mountain in 1995, turning an old barn on the site into his studio. Although it was their home, the Hunecks opened Dog Mountain to the public, inviting people to bring their dogs to two annual gatherings, the Dog Party and Dog Fest, where dogs could run off-leash.

Despite his critical success, Huneck and Dog Mountain suffered financially during the Great Recession and after having to lay off a number of employees, Huneck, who suffered from depression, committed suicide on January 7, 2010, outside his psychiatrist's office in Littleton, New Hampshire.

== Artistic style and works ==
Although he was largely self-taught as a carver, a skill he developed while working as a furniture restorer, Huneck was uncomfortable being labeled a "folk artist". He noted that while the simplicity and out-of-scale proportions of his work were similar to traditional outsider art, he rejected the idea that his work was naîve. He credited his time as an antiques dealer for the 19th century look of his work, including the trompe-l'œil effect in some pieces. Outside of initial cutting and final sanding, Huneck only used hand tools, and he had an atypical carving style, drawing the blade towards himself. Much of his work was carved from Vermont basswood, along with cherry, maple, and pine, harvested from Dog Mountain.

Pieces of Huneck's artwork are in the permanent collections of the Smithsonian Institution; Currier Museum of Art in Manchester, New Hampshire; the Museum of American Folk Art and American Kennel Club Museum of the Dog in New York City; and Shelburne Museum in Shelburne, Vermont.

In 1996, for its salute to folk art at the 1996 Olympic Games in Atlanta, The Coca-Cola Co. commissioned a 10-foot (3.0 m) Coke bottle carving from Huneck, which he capped with a gold-winged cow. Huneck also received commissions for works from celebrities and politicians, including Sandra Bullock, Phil McGraw, and U.S. Sen. Patrick Leahy.

=== The Dog Chapel ===
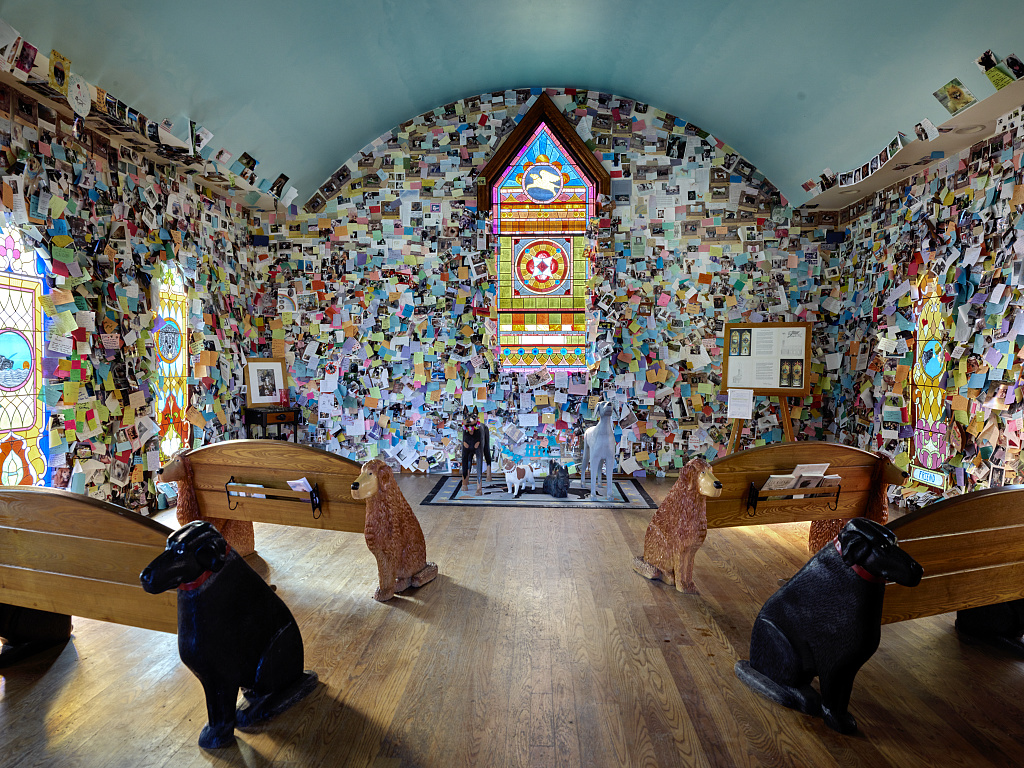
Inside The Dog Chapel (2017)

Huneck began building The Dog Chapel at Dog Mountain in 1997, completing the project in three years. Huneck described his coma as a "near death experience" during which a dog-headed figure visited him and sold him "a fantastic dog sculpture that seemed to contain the secrets of life itself," inspiring him to build the chapel. The chapel, a replica of a classic white New England country church from the 1820s, took three years to complete. It features carved wooden dogs lining the pews, and dog-themed stained glass windows in its 30-by-22-foot (9.1 m × 6.7 m) main room. In addition to standard human sized doors, the chapel has a dog door.

Atop the chapel's steeple is the golden Angel Dog sculpture, a 7-by-4-foot (2.1 m × 1.2 m) winged Labrador retriever taking flight. It acts as a fully functional weathervane. Angel Dog fell from the steeple in 2010, but was restored in 2020.

The walls of the chapel are covered with notes of remembrance and pictures of visitors' deceased pets. Outside the chapel is a sign reading "Welcome All Creeds All Breeds No Dogmas Allowed." Friends of Dog Mountain, the non-profit that manages the site, describes the chapel as Huneck's "greatest and most personal artistic contribution" as well as "a living piece of communal art and history, ever evolving with each new note and photo pinned to the memorial walls."

== Author and illustrator ==
In addition to carvings and woodcuts, Huneck wrote several children's books, the main character of which was Sally. Sally Goes to the Beach spent a week in The New York Times Review of Books children's best-sellers list in 2000, and Huneck earned a silver medal at the Society of Illustrators's The Original Art competition, which honors illustrations from children's books, in 2002 for Sally Goes to the Farm.

=== Bibliography ===
==== Children's books ====
- Sally Goes to the Beach (2000) ISBN 9780810941861 – New York Times best-seller
- Sally Goes to the Mountains (2001) ISBN 9780810944855
- Sally Goes to the Farm (2002) ISBN 9780810944985 – Society of Illustrators Silver Medal
- Sally Goes to the Vet (2004) ISBN 9780810948136
- Sally's Snow Adventure (2006) ISBN 9780810970618
- Sally Gets a Job (2008) ISBN 9780810994935
- Sally's Great Balloon Adventure (2010) ISBN 9780810983311

===== Board books =====
- Sally at the Farm (2014) ISBN 9781419710308
- Sally in the Sand (2014) ISBN 9781419710292
- Sally in the Snow (2014) ISBN 9781419712272
- Sally in the Forest (2014) ISBN 9781419712265

==== Other titles ====
- The Dog Chapel: Welcome All Breeds All Creeds No Dogmas Allowed (2002) ISBN 9780810934887
- Art of Stephen Huneck by Laura Beach (2004) ISBN 9780810955981
- My Dog's Brain (2009) ISBN 9780810982871
- Even Bad Dogs Go to Heaven: More from the Dog Chapel (2010) ISBN 9780810996298
- Sally Goes to Heaven (2014) ISBN 9781419709692
