= Little Dog Mountain =

Mountain in Montana, U.S.

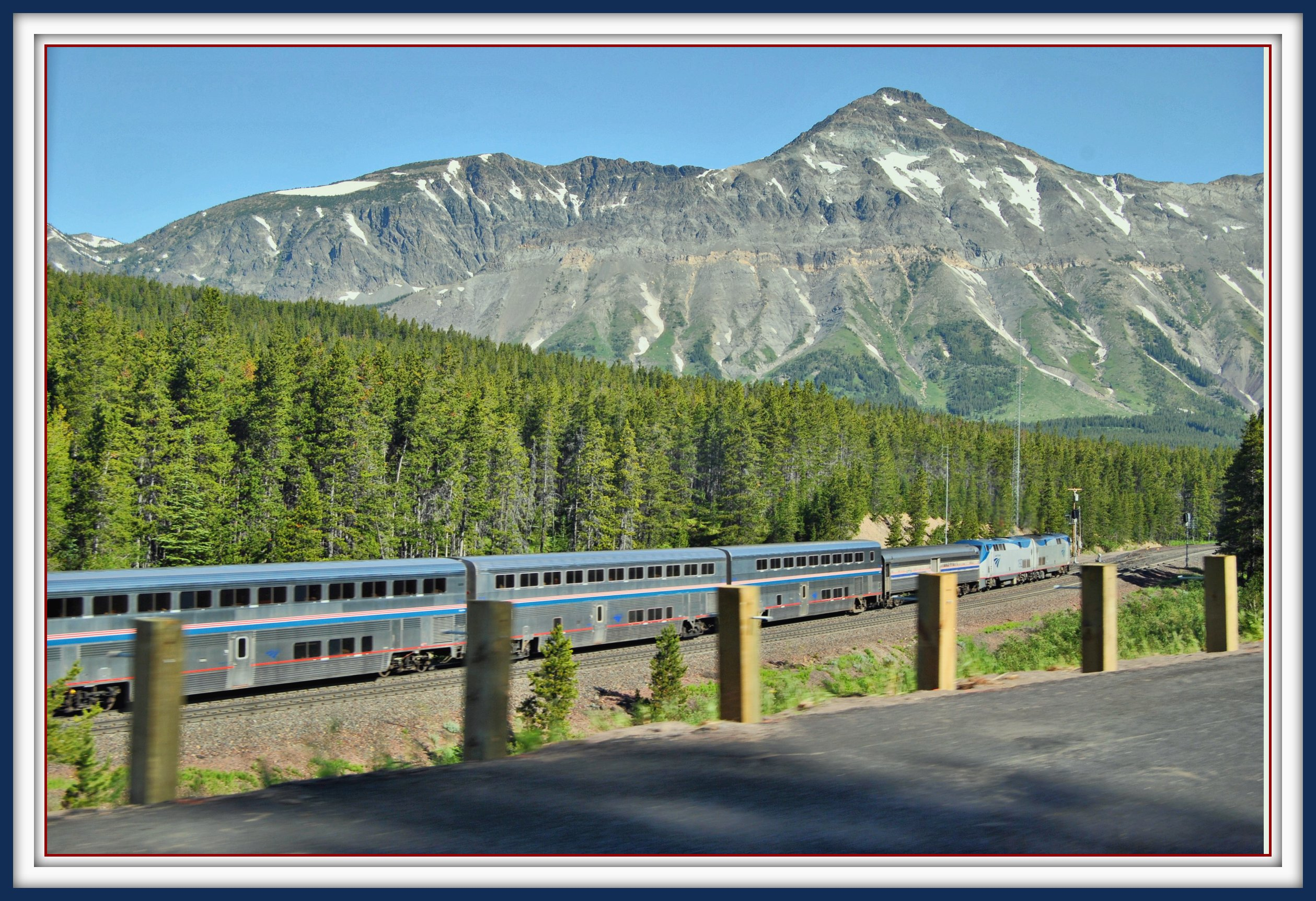
- Little Dog Mountain from Marias Pass

Highest point
- Elevation: 8,610 ft (2,620 m)
- Prominence: 690 ft (210 m)
- Coordinates: 48°20′35″N 113°23′13″W

Geography
- Location within Montana Location within the United States
- Location: Flathead County, Montana, Glacier County, Montana, U.S.
- Parent range: Lewis Range
- Topo map(s): USGS Summit, MT

Little Dog Mountain (8,610 feet (2,624 m)) is located in the Lewis Range, Glacier National Park in the U.S. state of Montana. Little Dog Mountain sits along the Continental Divide and can be easily seen from Marias Pass. The mountain was named by George Bird Grinnell for "Little Dog," Blackfoot Indian Chief who, in 1853, informed Isaac Stevens, the new Governor of the Washington Territory, of the existence of Marias Pass.

== See also ==
- Mountains and mountain ranges of Glacier National Park (U.S.)
