= El Cid Historic District =

Historic district in Florida, United States

- U.S. National Register of Historic Places
- U.S. Historic district
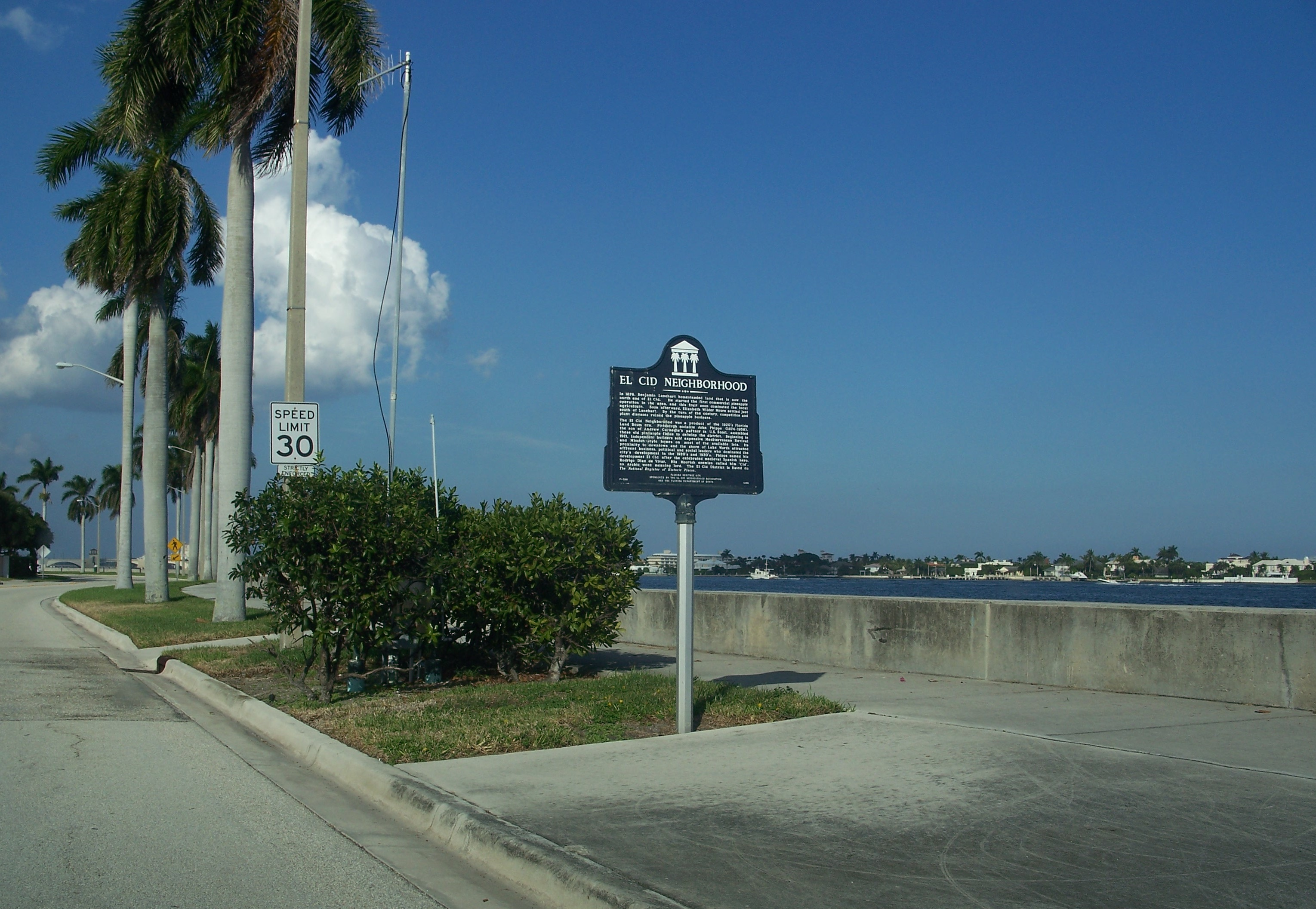
- Historic Marker

- Location within Florida Location within the United States
- Location: West Palm Beach, Florida
- Coordinates: 26°41′32″N 80°03′08″W
- Area: 500 acres (2.0 km^{2})
- NRHP reference No.: 95001064
- Added to NRHP: August 31, 1995

The El Cid Historic District is a U.S. historic district (designated as such on August 31, 1995) located in West Palm Beach, Florida. The district is bounded by Flamingo Drive, South Flagler Drive, Dyer Road and South Dixie Highway. It contains 281 historic buildings.

== History ==
Benjamin Lainhart became the first permanent resident of the western shore of Lake Worth in 1875, building a cabin in what is now the El Cid neighborhood near present-day Barcelona Road with help from his cousin, William Lainhart. For thousands of years, the Everglades had isolated the area from the rest of Florida. There is no evidence of permanent settlement in the area by the indigenous Jeaga, Tequesta or the Seminole Indian Tribes.

In 1876, Lainhart homesteaded land that includes the entire historic district north of Belvedere Road. Soon afterward, Elizabeth Wilder (Moore) settled on the Lake just to the south of Lainhart. In 1883, she officially homesteaded land that includes the entire historic district south of Belvedere Road. The road, of course, was built decades later. Arriving pioneers purchased pieces of the Lainhart and Wilder homesteads and, by 1910, had divided the two properties into 22 parcels.

Lainhart started the first commercial pineapple operation in the area, and pineapples soon dominated local agriculture. By the turn of the century, George Matham's Florida Pineapple Company covered most of the historic district north of Sunset Road with pineapple fields. Competition from Cuba and disease, however, ruined the pineapple business early in the new century.

In 1894, Henry Flagler's railroad arrived and the Town of West Palm Beach incorporated. The Town's population doubled in the 1900s and quadrupled during the next decade, when a few houses were built in the historic district. The El Cid Neighborhood was primarily a product of the 1920s Land Boom, when the Town's population doubled again.

During the 1920s, Pittsburgh socialite Jay Phipps, the son of Andrew Carnegie's partner in U.S. Steel, assembled the old pineapple fields and other property to develop the historic district. Between 1923 and 1926, independent builders sold expensive Mediterranean Revival and Mission-style homes on most of the available lots. Phipps named this development of predominantly Spanish-style homes El Cid after the celebrated Spanish hero, Rodrigo Diaz de Bivar (1040–1099), who led Castilians and Iberian Moors to conquer Valencia in 1094. Moors called him “Cid” an Arabic term meaning “lord.”

The neighborhood's proximity to downtown and the western shore of Lake Worth attracted affluent business, political and social leaders who dominated the community's development in the 1920s and 1930s. The early collapse of the banks in Florida, followed by the Depression, limited further development. After World War II, there was a burst of infill housing construction. Unfortunately, the movement to suburbia in the 1960s diminished the area's prosperity. But the downturn did not last long.

The El Cid Historic District is listed on the local, State, and National Register of Historic Places.

== See also ==
- Concept of architecture in El Cid: Mediterranean Revival architecture and Mission Style
