= Dog Mountain (dog park) =

Dog park and art gallery in St. Johnsbury, Vermont, United States

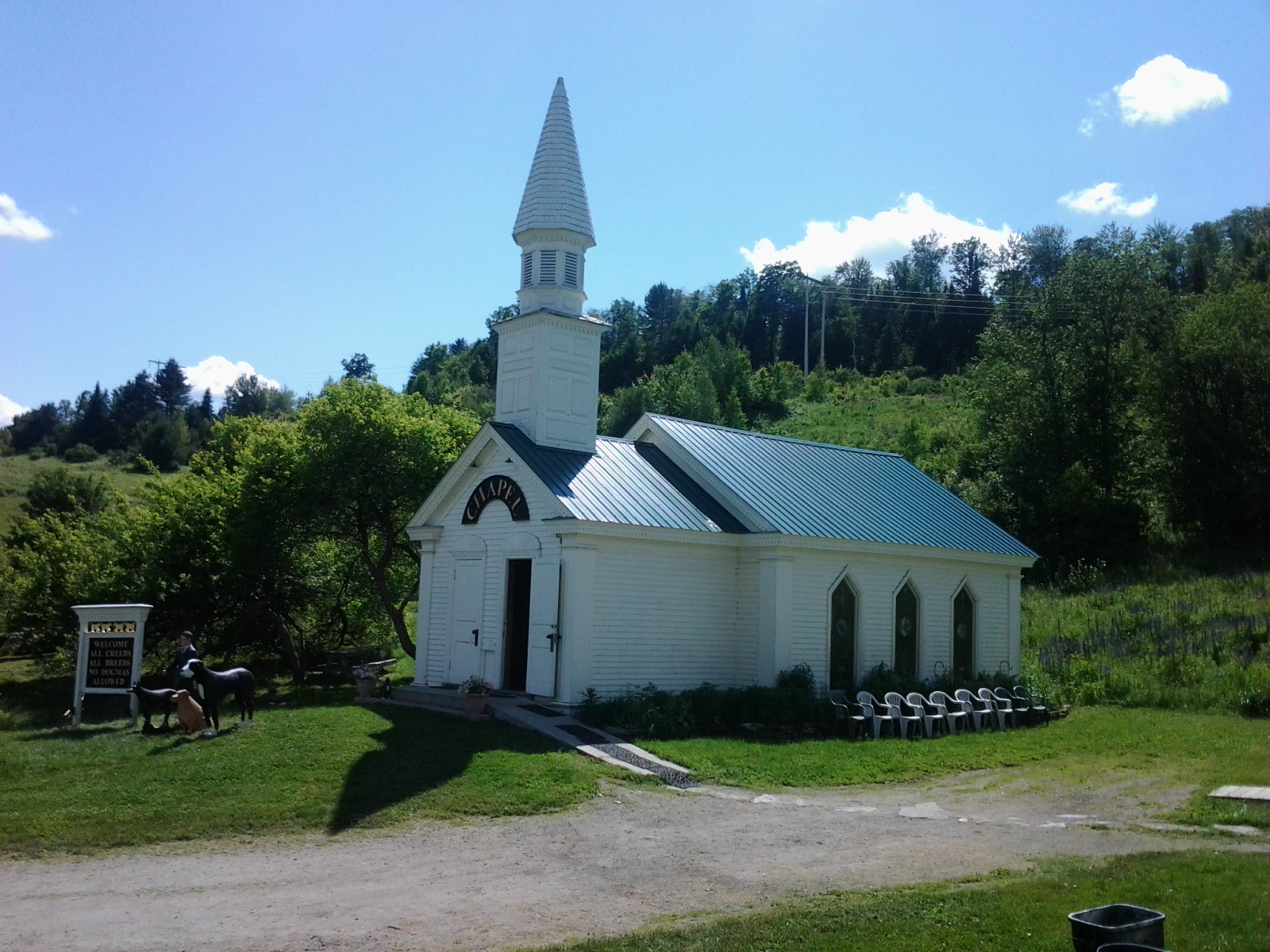
- The Dog Chapel at Dog Mountain in 2013
- Interactive map of Dog Mountain
- Location: St. Johnsbury, Vermont
- Coordinates: 44°26′07″N 71°58′53″W
- Elevation: 899 metres (2,949 ft)
- Created: 1995
- Operator: Friends of Dog Mountain
- Open: Fri–Sun: 10 am–5 pm

Dog Mountain is a 150-acre (61 ha) property in St. Johnsbury, Vermont, with trails, a pond, and fields open for off-leash roaming by dogs and their people. Dog Mountain began as the home and studio of Vermont folk artists Stephen Huneck and Gwen Huneck, and the site includes an art gallery featuring Stephen's art. It is also home to The Dog Chapel (2000), a replica of a classic white New England country church built by Stephen and featuring his dog sculptures, stained-glass, and paintings. After the deaths of Stephen in 2010 and Gwen in 2013, the site has been managed by the non-profit Friends of Dog Mountain.

== Background ==
Vermont artists Stephen and Gwen Huneck were married for 35 years. He taught himself to carve wood and started carving images of dogs. He built a chapel for dogs in St. Johnsbury, Vermont, for dog owners to come to have time with their pets. They also hoped that it would be a place where people could mourn for the dogs in their lives that had died and find comfort by leaving notes and remembrances. The small chapel was filled with thousands of notes and pictures that people left to pay tribute to their pets. It also had Stephen's carvings in it. Stephen built the chapel himself in the style of an 1820s Vermont village church.

In 2025, the site joined the Historic Artists' Homes and Studios program of the National Trust for Historic Preservation, which marks sites open to the public that preserve and interpret the work of artists.

== Hard times ==
During the 2008 financial crisis, the Hunecks started to have difficulties. They needed to sell many prints, sculptures, furniture and books in order to keep the place going and this proved harder to do during the recession. Stephen took his life in January 2010 and Gwen then struggled to keep Dog Mountain going. She took her own life, as well, in 2013.

== Films ==
A documentary about the location, Dog Mountain: A Love Story, was produced by Dan Collison and Elizabeth Meister for Long Haul Productions, with support from the National Endowment for the Arts and KCRW’s Independent Producer Project.
