= National Register of Historic Places listings in Washington County, New York =

Location of Washington County in New York

List of the National Register of Historic Places listings in Washington County, New York

This is intended to be a complete list of properties and districts listed on the National Register of Historic Places in Washington County, New York. The locations of National Register properties and districts (at least for all showing latitude and longitude coordinates below) may be seen in a map by clicking on "Map of all coordinates". One property, the Lemuel Haynes House, is further designated a U.S. National Historic Landmark.

This National Park Service list is complete through NPS recent listings posted July 17, 2026.

Contents: Counties in New York
Albany (Albany) – Allegany – Bronx – Broome – Cattaraugus – Cayuga – Chautauqua – Chemung – Chenango – Clinton – Columbia – Cortland – Delaware – Dutchess (Poughkeepsie, Rhinebeck) – Erie (Buffalo) – Essex – Franklin – Fulton – Genesee – Greene – Hamilton – Herkimer – Jefferson – Kings – Lewis – Livingston – Madison – Monroe (Rochester) – Montgomery – Nassau – New York (Below 14th Street, 14th to 59th Streets, 59th to 110th Streets, Above 110th Street, Islands) – Niagara (Niagara Falls) – Oneida – Onondaga (Syracuse) – Ontario – Orange – Orleans – Oswego – Otsego – Putnam – Queens – Rensselaer – Richmond – Rockland – St. Lawrence – Saratoga – Schenectady – Schoharie – Schuyler – Seneca – Steuben – Suffolk – Sullivan – Tioga – Tompkins – Ulster – Warren – Washington – Wayne – Westchester (Northern, Southern, New Rochelle, Peekskill, Yonkers) – Wyoming – Yates

== County-wide listings ==
| | Name on the Register | Image | Date listed | Location | City or town | Description |
|---|---|---|---|---|---|---|
| 1 | Susan B. Anthony Childhood House | | April 13, 2007 (#06001079) | 2835 NY 29; 43°06′38″N 73°25′23″W | Battenville | |
| 2 | Baker-Merrill House | | July 26, 2006 (#06000650) | 38 Grove Rd. 42°59′28″N 73°33′06″W | Easton | |
| 3 | Brown's Tavern | Brown's Tavern | September 22, 2000 (#00001154) | 7755 NY 40; 43°20′41″N 73°24′35″W | South Hartford | |
| 4 | Burton Hall | Burton Hall | September 17, 2015 (#15000610) | 1071 NY 40; 43°06′13″N 73°31′30″W | North Easton | 1901 Easton town hall built through efforts of local philanthropist |
| 5 | Buskirk Covered Bridge | Buskirk Covered Bridge | March 8, 1978 (#78003457) | Spans Hoosic River north of NY 67; 42°57′30″N 73°26′00″W | Buskirk | part of the Covered Bridges of Washington County Thematic Resource (TR) |
| 6 | Cambridge Historic District | Cambridge Historic District | November 15, 1978 (#78001922) | Irregular pattern along Main and S. Union Sts. 43°01′30″N 73°22′58″W | Cambridge | Historic remnants of the three hamlets that merged to form Cambridge |
| 7 | Champlain Canal | Champlain Canal | September 1, 1976 (#76001274) | Extends north from Troy to Whitehall; 43°09′34″N 73°34′48″W | extends from Waterford through Fort Edward to Whitehall | |
| 8 | Coffin Site | | July 22, 1980 (#80002786) | Address Restricted | Greenwich | |
| 9 | Hiram Congdon House | Hiram Congdon House | September 30, 1997 (#97001203) | Northeast of the junction of NY 22 and B Rd. 43°41′58″N 73°25′52″W | Putnam | |
| 10 | Dayton-Williams House | Dayton-Williams House | November 8, 2006 (#06001000) | 65 Dayton Hill Rd. 43°26′02″N 73°17′04″W | Middle Granville | |
| 11 | DeRidder Homestead | | March 22, 1974 (#74001315) | East of Schuylerville off NY 29; 43°05′57″N 73°34′04″W | Easton | |
| 12 | Dresden District School No. 2 | | April 5, 2019 (#100003631) | North Road; 43°38′17″N 73°27′21″W | Clemons | 1880s wooden one-room schoolhouse used through 1940s |
| 13 | Eagleville Covered Bridge | Eagleville Covered Bridge | March 8, 1978 (#78003458) | Spans Batten Kill off NY 313; 43°05′00″N 73°18′51″W | Eagleville in the towns of Jackson and Salem, New York | part of the Covered Bridges of Washington County TR |
| 14 | Easton Friends North Meetinghouse | Easton Friends North Meetinghouse | October 5, 2005 (#05001132) | NY 40, Schaghticoke-Middle Falls Rd. 43°03′25″N 73°32′04″W | Middle Falls | |
| 15 | Farmer's National Bank and W.H. Hughes Slate Company Office | Farmer's National Bank and W.H. Hughes Slate Company Office | June 13, 2014 (#14000330) | 44-46 Main St. 43°24′27″N 73°15′46″W | Granville | Stone Colonial Revival buildings complementing the neighboring post office |
| 16 | Fort Edward D&H Train Station | Fort Edward D&H Train Station | December 13, 2000 (#00001527) | East and Wing Sts. 43°16′11″N 73°34′51″W | Fort Edward | part of the Glens Falls Multiple Resource Area (MRA) |
| 17 | Fort Miller Reformed Church Complex | Fort Miller Reformed Church Complex | December 6, 1996 (#96001431) | Fort Miller Rd., west of US 4 and south of Galusha Island; 43°09′49″N 73°34′55″W | Fort Edward | |
| 18 | Glens Falls Feeder Canal | Glens Falls Feeder Canal | October 25, 1985 (#85003401) | Roughly between Richardson St. and the Old Champlain Canal; 43°18′07″N 73°37′53″W | Hudson Falls | |
| 19 | Greenwich District School No. 11 | | December 30, 2020 (#100005961) | 4 Ryan Rd. 43°06′03″N 73°27′00″W | Center Falls | |
| 20 | Hartford Baptist Church and Cemetery | Hartford Baptist Church and Cemetery | August 20, 2004 (#04000875) | 56 NY 23 (Main St.); 43°21′53″N 73°23′35″W | Hartford | 1891 late Victorian Gothic church built on site of congregation's first church in 1789. |
| 21 | Lemuel Haynes House | Lemuel Haynes House | May 15, 1975 (#75001235) | Rte. 149; 43°22′16″N 73°17′00″W | South Granville | Last home of first ordained African-American minister in U.S. |
| 22 | Hebron District School No. 16 | | April 16, 2012 (#12000211) | NY 22; 43°15′44″N 73°17′14″W | East Hebron | |
| 23 | Hebron Valley Grange No. 1103 | | July 28, 2006 (#06000649) | 3185 Cty Rte 30; 43°13′50″N 73°22′34″W | West Hebron | |
| 24 | Home Farm | Home Farm | December 5, 2008 (#08001147) | 591 Co. Rt. 18; 43°32′35″N 73°21′14″W | East Whitehall | |
| 25 | Hudson Falls Historic District | Hudson Falls Historic District | September 15, 1983 (#83001825) | Roughly bounded by Oak, Mechanic, River, Maple and Main Sts. 43°18′00″N 73°35′09″W | Hudson Falls | |
| 26 | Main Street Historic District | Main Street Historic District | April 24, 1975 (#75001236) | Both sides of Williams St. and both sides of Main St. Bridge to below Saunders St. Bridge; 43°33′22″N 73°24′07″W | Whitehall | |
| 27 | Martin–Fitch House and Asa Fitch Jr. Laboratory | | June 9, 2014 (#14000290) | 4183 NY 29; 43°09′05″N 73°22′55″W | Salem | Home and laboratory of Asa Fitch, first occupational entomologist in the U.S. |
| 28 | Maxwell Farm | | June 27, 2012 (#12000368) | 311 County Rd. 61; 43°06′19″N 73°24′13″W | Jackson | |
| 29 | Thomas McLean House | | October 31, 2007 (#07001128) | NY 29; 43°06′47″N 73°25′20″W | Battenville | |
| 30 | Alexander McNish House | | November 29, 2010 (#10000959) | 194 County Road 30; 43°10′14″N 73°21′07″W | Salem | |
| 31 | William Miller Farm Historic District | William Miller Farm Historic District | July 17, 1975 (#75001233) | County Rd 11 west of US 4; 43°35′42″N 73°18′45″W | Hampton | Boundary increase and renamed (from "William Miller Chapel and Ascension Rock"), approved April 4, 1994. |
| 32 | Moss Street Cemetery | Moss Street Cemetery | February 14, 2017 (#100000650) | 3097 US 4; 43°19′22″N 73°34′22″W | Hudson Falls vicinity | |
| 33 | New York State Barge Canal | New York State Barge Canal | October 15, 2014 (#14000860) | Linear across county 43°15′25″N 73°35′01″W | Easton, Fort Ann, Fort Edward, Greenwich, Hartford, Kingsbury, Whitehall | Successor to Champlain Canal approved by state voters in early 20th century to compete with railroads. |
| 34 | Old Fort House | Old Fort House | September 15, 1983 (#83001826) | 29 Lower Broadway; 43°15′40″N 73°34′51″W | Fort Edward | |
| 35 | Old Stone House Library | Old Stone House Library | March 6, 2013 (#13000055) | 36 George St. 43°24′44″N 73°29′18″W | Fort Ann | Built around 1825, this house is one of the few intact structures from the days of the Champlain Canal's construction |
| 36 | Judge Joseph Potter House | Judge Joseph Potter House | May 2, 1974 (#74001316) | Mountain Ter. 43°33′21″N 73°23′58″W | Whitehall | |
| 37 | Revolutionary War Cemetery | Revolutionary War Cemetery | August 11, 2004 (#04000822) | 9 Archibald St. 43°10′02″N 73°19′47″W | Salem | Oldest cemetery in town, with almost 1,100 graves, many local veterans of the war |
| 38 | Rexleigh Covered Bridge | Rexleigh Covered Bridge | March 8, 1978 (#78003459) | Off NY 22; 43°11′25″N 73°20′05″W | Jackson | part of the Covered Bridges of Washington County TR |
| 39 | Rogers Island | | July 24, 1973 (#73001283) | In the Hudson River; 43°15′42″N 73°35′08″W | Fort Edward | |
| 40 | St. James Episcopal Church | St. James Episcopal Church | January 7, 1998 (#97001617) | 112 Broadway; 43°16′02″N 73°35′06″W | Fort Edward | |
| 41 | Salem Historic District | Salem Historic District | May 28, 1975 (#75001234) | Both sides of Broadway and Main Sts. from RR tracks on N and W to include White Creek on S and E 43°10′19″N 73°19′39″W | Salem | Historic core of one of the oldest settlements in the region, with many intact 19th century buildings |
| 42 | Shushan Covered Bridge | Shushan Covered Bridge | March 8, 1978 (#78003460) | Spans Batten Kill off NY 22; 43°05′28″N 73°20′45″W | Shushan | part of the Covered Bridges of Washington County TR |
| 43 | L. C. Simonds Adirondack Cabin | | November 29, 2010 (#10000941) | 130 Cat Den Rd. 43°36′56″N 73°25′27″W | Clemons | |
| 44 | South Granville Congregational Church and Parsonage | South Granville Congregational Church and Parsonage | May 19, 2005 (#05000442) | 7179 NY 149; 43°22′19″N 73°17′15″W | South Granville | 1840s church and parsonage; former expanded 1873 |
| 45 | Stoops Hotel | | June 30, 2009 (#09000481) | 2839 NY 29; 43°06′56″N 73°25′20″W | Battenville | |
| 46 | Elisha Straight House | Elisha Straight House | September 15, 2004 (#04000986) | 55 Main St. 43°21′53″N 73°23′38″W | Hartford | Early home in Hartford used as recruitment center during Civil War. Now local history museum |
| 47 | Thomson District No. 10 School | | March 25, 2024 (#100010104) | 5158 County Route 113; 43°07′18″N 73°34′38″W | Greenwich | |
| 48 | Town-Hollister Farm | | June 13, 2008 (#08000516) | NY 22; 43°26′57″N 73°20′33″W | North Granville | |
| 49 | US Post Office-Granville | US Post Office-Granville | May 11, 1989 (#88002520) | 41 Main St. 43°26′03″N 73°15′35″W | Granville | One of only three Colonial Revival post offices with a raised parapet along the gables. Asymmetrical fenestration is unusual in a Depression-era post office of that size. Part of the US Post Offices in New York State, 1858-1943, TR |
| 50 | US Post Office-Hudson Falls | US Post Office-Hudson Falls | May 11, 1989 (#88002509) | 114 Main St. 43°17′59″N 73°35′08″W | Hudson Falls | part of the US Post Offices in New York State, 1858-1943, TR |
| 51 | US Post Office-Whitehall | US Post Office-Whitehall | May 11, 1989 (#88002447) | 88 Broadway; 43°33′12″N 73°24′16″W | Whitehall | part of the US Post Offices in New York State, 1858-1943, TR |
| 52 | Village of Greenwich Historic District | Village of Greenwich Historic District | August 31, 1995 (#95001025) | Roughly, along Academy, Church, Cottage, Gray, Main, Prospect and Salem Sts. and Washington Sq., Town of Greenwich; 43°05′30″N 73°29′55″W | Greenwich | |
| 53 | White Creek Historic District | White Creek Historic District | April 26, 1979 (#79001644) | SR 68, Byars and Niles Rds. 42°58′18″N 73°17′22″W | White Creek | |
| 54 | Whitehall Armory | Whitehall Armory | March 2, 1995 (#95000079) | 62 Poultney St. 43°32′59″N 73°23′48″W | Whitehall | part of the Army National Guard Armories in New York State Multiple Property Submission (MPS) |
| 55 | Whitehall Fire Station | Whitehall Fire Station | April 30, 2018 (#100002367) | 161 Main Street; 43°33′16″N 73°24′10″W | Whitehall | |
| 56 | Wing-Northup House | Wing-Northup House | September 12, 2008 (#08000862) | 167 Broadway; 43°16′10″N 73°35′14″W | Fort Edward | |

== See also ==
- National Register of Historic Places listings in New York
