= United States Post Office (Granville, New York) =

- U.S. Post Office
- U.S. National Register of Historic Places
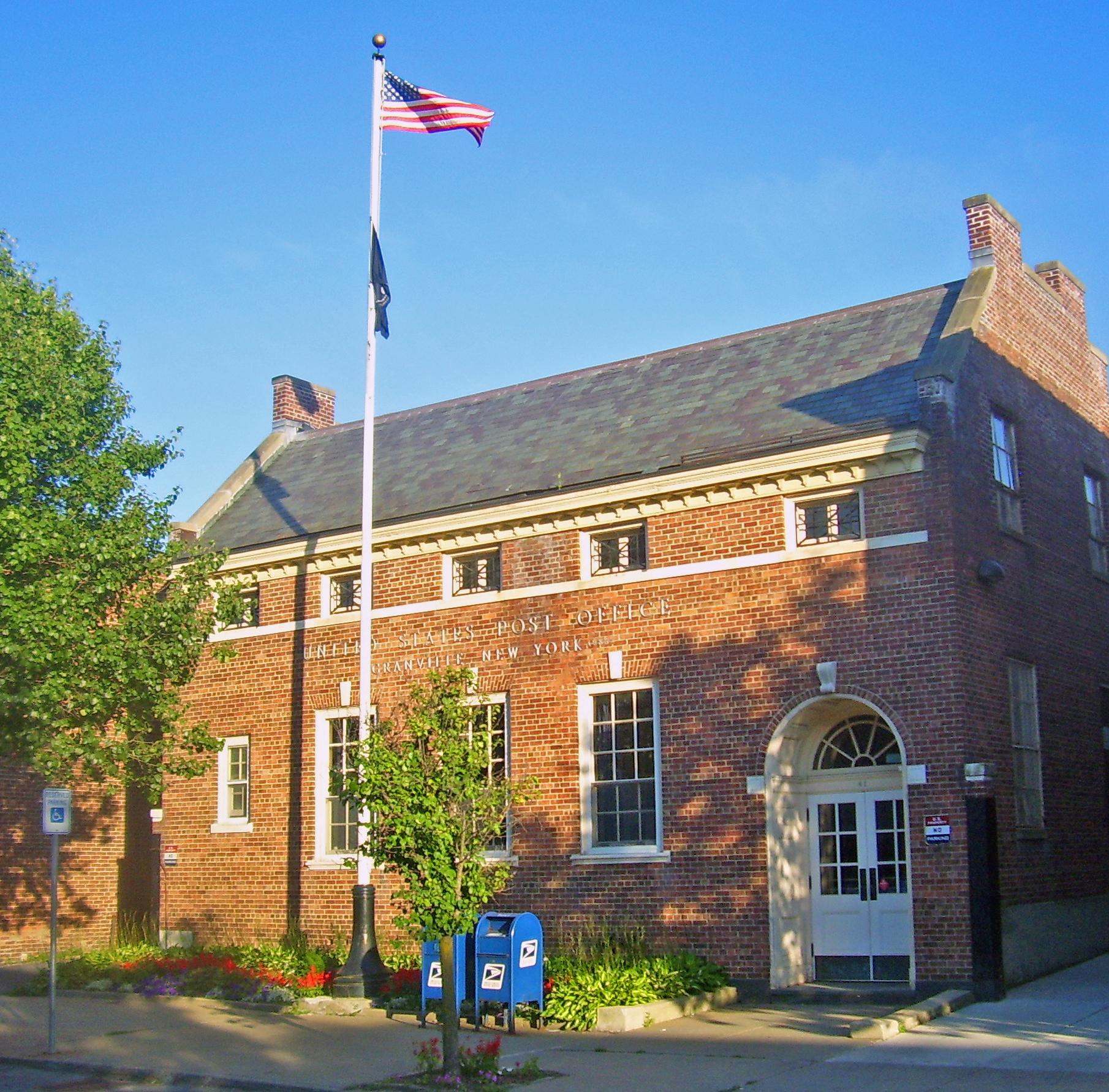
- North elevation and west profile, 2008

- Location within New York Location within the United States
- Location: Granville, NY
- Nearest city: Hudson Falls
- Coordinates: 43°24′27″N 73°15′36″W
- Built: 1935–36
- Architect: Louis A. Simon
- Architectural style: Colonial Revival
- MPS: US Post Offices in New York State, 1858–1943, TR
- NRHP reference No.: 88002520
- Added to NRHP: May 11, 1989

The U.S. Post Office in Granville, New York, United States, is located on Main Street (NY 149) in the center of the village. It is a brick building serving the ZIP Code 12832, which covers the village and surrounding areas of the Town of Granville.

It was built in the mid-1930s as part of a relief effort to provide jobs during the Depression. Like many post offices in small towns from that era designed by Treasury Department Supervising Architect Louis Simon, it uses the Colonial Revival architectural style. Within that style of post office in New York, it is distinguished by the raised parapet on its roofline, found on only two other post offices in the state, and the asymmetrical arrangement of its front facade, very unusual on a post office of that size erected at that time. In 1989 it was listed on the National Register of Historic Places, the only building in the village of Granville yet listed.

== Building ==
The post office is situated on a narrow lot on the south side of Main Street. The surrounding neighborhood is entirely composed of two-story commercial buildings. There is a narrow alley between the post office and the building to its east, and a driveway on the west leading to a parking lot in the rear. It is set back from the street slightly more than its neighbors, with plantings and a flagpole in front.

It is a five-by-six-bay one-and-a-half–story steel frame structure on a raised foundation of slate on the front and cast stone on the rear and sides. The upper floors are faced in brick laid in common bond. The gabled roof is shingled in slate with raised parapets topped by stone coping at the gable ends. The bricks of the parapets are stacked to appear as a false chimney. The four-bay rear wing has a flat roof with stone coping; a loading dock projects from it.

The northern (front) facade has the recessed, arched entryway placed asymmetrically, in the westernmost bay. It is decorated with a marble scrolled keystone and end blocks. The entryway itself, level with the sidewalk, has a coffered ceiling and paneled reveal. It is topped with a fanlight.

Marble piers 9 feet (3 m) high are at either corner of the front. The window on the easternmost bay is smaller than the middle three. All have splayed brick lintels, marble keystones and sills. Above them are bronze letters reading "UNITED STATES POST OFFICE GRANVILLE, NEW YORK" and a marble beltcourse setting off the mezzanine-level eyebrow windows with metal screens. Those windows, in turn, are topped with a bracketed box cornice.

The entrance leads to a vestibule with stairs and another set of double wood doors to the lobby, which runs perpendicular to the main facade. It has flagstone floors and a similar dado around the walls to counter height. The ceiling is plaster with a molded cornice. The wooden tables and bulletin board are original.

== History ==
Granville's first post office was established in 1797, after the village's location in New York (rather than Vermont, which it borders on the east) was settled. Like many other post offices in small towns, it was located in rented space in other buildings throughout most of the 19th century, and the first quarter of the 20th.

In 1931, Congress authorized the construction of 136 new post offices in New York as an early relief measure against the onset of the Great Depression. Granville's was among them. Construction began in 1935 following the demolition of a row of stores that had occupied the site. A Maryland-based contractor did the work for the $75,000 ($1.76 million in contemporary dollars) that had been budgeted. It was completed and opened the following year.

Louis A. Simon, supervising architect for the Treasury Department, designed the building in the Colonial Revival mode, standard for post offices in small communities since the early years of the 20th century. For Granville, Simon applied the style in an unusually ornate, atypical way. In addition to features like the entry arch and the cornice, its raised parapet at the gable is found on only two other post offices in the state, Dobbs Ferry downstate and Hudson Falls nearby. And while he or other Treasury postal architects sometimes used asymmetrical facades on smaller, three-bay structures like that at Whitehall to the north, Granville's is the only Depression-era five-bay post office in New York with one.

== See also ==
- National Register of Historic Places listings in Washington County, New York
