= Greenwich, New York =

Greenwich, New York may refer to:

- Greenwich (village), New York, in Washington County
- Greenwich (town), New York, in Washington County
- Greenwich Village, in New York City
