= Dresden, New York =

Dresden is the name of some places in the U.S. state of New York:

- Dresden, Washington County, New York, a town
- Dresden, Yates County, New York, a village
