= L. C. Simonds Adirondack Cabin =

Historic house in New York, United States

- U.S. National Register of Historic Places
- Location within New York Location within the United States
- Location: 130 Cat Den Rd., near Clemons, New York
- Coordinates: 43°36′56″N 73°25′27″W
- Area: less than one acre
- Built: 1910
- Built by: Barber, P. H.
- NRHP reference No.: 10000941
- Added to NRHP: November 29, 2010

L. C. Simonds Adirondack Cabin, also known as "Breezy Bluff Cottage," is a historic home located near Clemons, Washington County, New York. It was built in 1910 and is a rustic Adirondack-style dwelling.

The Simonds Adirondack Cabin is a log cabin constructed of spruce logs, and has a 1 1/2-story main block with a kitchen addition The main block has a medium-pitched gable roof with pent roof dormers. It features a verandah that once wrapped around the building and a pink granite fireplace.

The structure was added to the National Register of Historic Places in 2010.

== See also ==
- Adirondack Architecture
- Rustic architecture
- National Register of Historic Places listings in Washington County, New York
