= United States Post Office (Dobbs Ferry, New York) =

- U.S. National Register of Historic Places
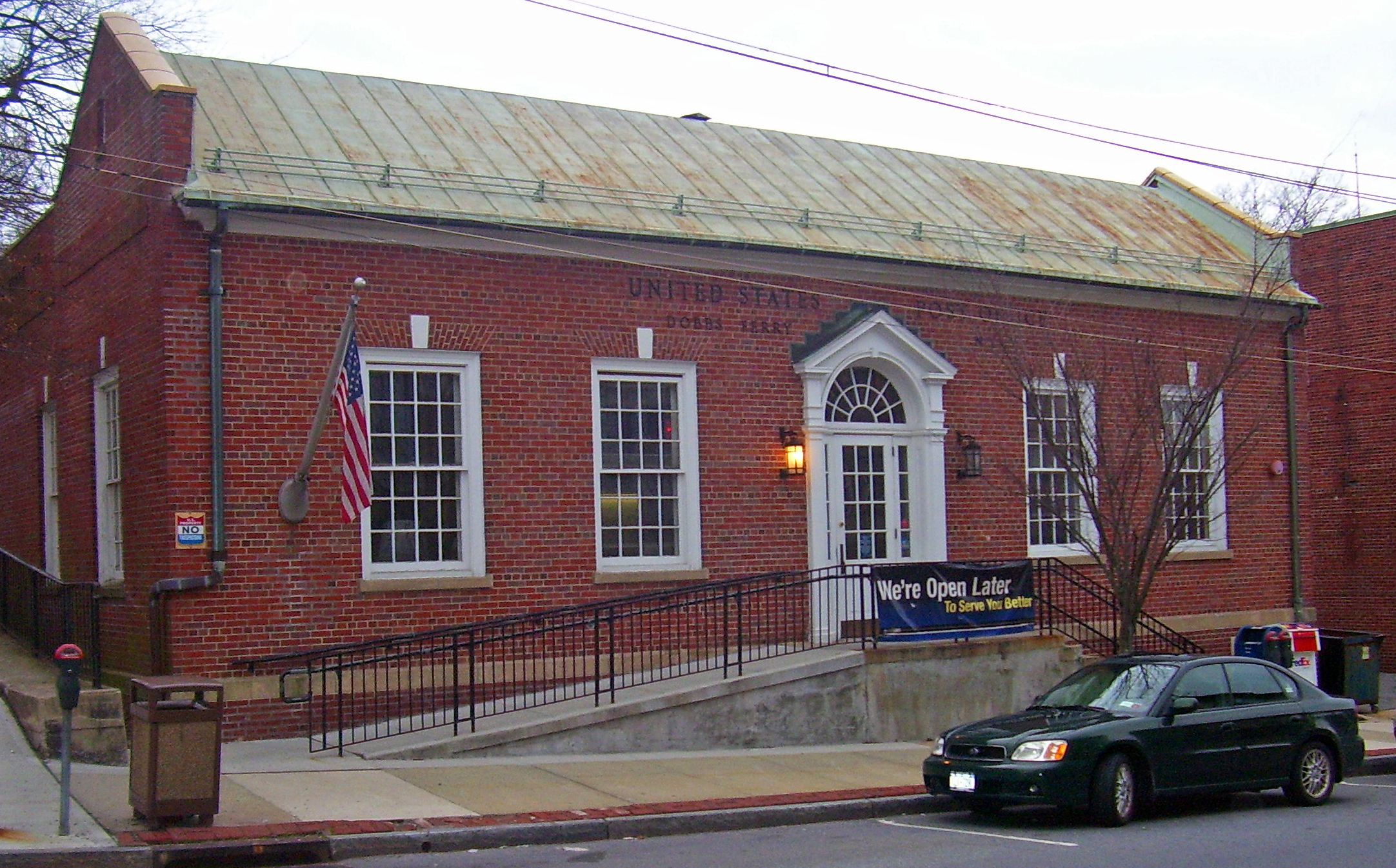
- Front elevation, 2008

- Location within New York Location within the United States
- Interactive map showing the location for U.S. Post Office, Dobbs Ferry
- Location: 120 Main St., Dobbs Ferry, NY
- Coordinates: 41.0153°N 73.8745°W
- Built: 1936; 90 years ago
- Architect: Louis Simon
- Architectural style: Colonial Revival
- MPS: US Post Offices in New York State, 1858-1943, TR
- NRHP reference No.: 88002484
- Added to NRHP: 1988

The United States Post Office in Dobbs Ferry, New York serves the ZIP Code 10522, which covers the village of Dobbs Ferry. It is a brick Colonial Revival structure located at the corner of Main and Oak streets, in the downtown section.

It was built in 1936, as part of a massive postal construction effort. Its architecture features a high level of detail and ornament for the Colonial Revival style. Only two other post offices in New York in that style share the same level of detail. For this reason it was added to the National Register of Historic Places in 1988.

== Building ==
The post office is a one-story, five-by-five-bay steel frame building occupying the corner lot. The ground slopes slightly from the rear to the west-facing front facade (the Hudson River is a short distance in that direction). Thus it was built on a raised foundation. From the rear a three-bay wing projects, giving access to the parking lot.

The foundation and exteriors are faced with red brick laid in common bond. The front section, one bay deep, has a roof done in copper with parapeted gables on the end walls. The remainder of the roof is flat. Cast-stone coping outlines the entire roof, and the front has a boxed wood cornice. Bronze lettering above the entrance identifies it as the Dobbs Ferry post office.

The entrance centers the entire main facade. It is arched, with flanking wooden pilasters topped with dosserets and a denticulated (toothed) broken-bed pediment. The windows feature splayed brick lintels and capping keystones. Two iron lantern-style lamps frame the door.

Inside, the lobby takes an L-shaped form through four of the five bays. It features orange quarry tile and a counter-height dado. The plaster ceiling is coved, and the original wood frames on the bulletin boards and windows, as well as iron grilles on the screenline, remain.

== History ==
Dobbs Ferry had had a post office under its earlier names of Wickquaequeeck and Greenburgh prior to its incorporation in 1872 and change to its current name a decade later. In 1915 the U.S. Post Office, then under the auspices of the Treasury Department, began to standardize its local branches across the country. This trend reached Dobbs Ferry when it became one of 136 new post offices authorized for New York State under an amendment to the Public Buildings Act of 1931.

Congress did not get around to appropriating the money for a new Dobbs Ferry post office until 1934. In November of that year the current property was acquired for $11,700, and an existing store and residence condemned to make way for the new building. Congress then made $95,000 available for construction, and the Summit Brothers firm began work the next year. The new post office opened for business in 1936.

The design, by Treasury supervising architect Louis Simon, used a Colonial Revival style, common for many post offices in and out of New York from 1905 onward. Most of these were simple, somewhat spartan structures, and the level of ornamentation at Dobbs Ferry is a departure from the norm. In New York, only the Granville and Hudson Falls post offices share the parapeted gables and window keystones.

It has remained largely intact since its construction. Modern aluminum doors have been installed at the entrance, as well as modern lighting inside. The most significant alteration was the replacement of the original double staircase to the front entrance with a wheelchair-accessible ramp, mandated in federal buildings by the Americans with Disabilities Act of 1990.

== See also ==
- National Register of Historic Places listings in southern Westchester County, New York
