= Thomas McLean House =

Historic house in New York, United States

- U.S. National Register of Historic Places
- Location within New York Location within the United States
- Location: NY 29, Battenville, New York
- Coordinates: 43°6′47″N 73°25′20″W
- Area: 2.5 acres (1.0 ha)
- Built: 1795
- Architectural style: Federal, Greek Revival
- NRHP reference No.: 07001128
- Added to NRHP: October 31, 2007

Thomas McLean House is a historic home in Battenville, New York, United States. It was built between about 1795 and 1867 and consists of a five-bay, two-story main block with two 1 1/2-story wings. Also on the property are two timber-frame barns, a 1-story commercial building, shed, and remains of a stone foundation. It is located across from the Stoops Hotel.

It was listed on the National Register of Historic Places in 2007.
