= Fishbrook Pond =

- Location within New York Fishbrook Pond (the United States)
- Location: Washington County, New York, United States
- Coordinates: 43°34′32″N 73°32′15″W
- Type: Lake
- Basin countries: United States
- Surface area: 39 acres (0.16 km^{2})
- Average depth: 19 feet (5.8 m)
- Max. depth: 57 feet (17 m)
- Shore length^{1}: 1.4 miles (2.3 km)
- Surface elevation: 1,834 feet (559 m)
- Islands: 2
- Settlements: Hullets Landing, New York
- ^{1} Shore length is not a well-defined measure.

Fishbrook Pond is located south of Hullets Landing, New York. Fish species present in the lake are brook trout, rainbow trout, and brown bullhead. There is a trail from Pine Brook Road.
