= Revolutionary War Cemetery =

Historic cemetery in New York, United States

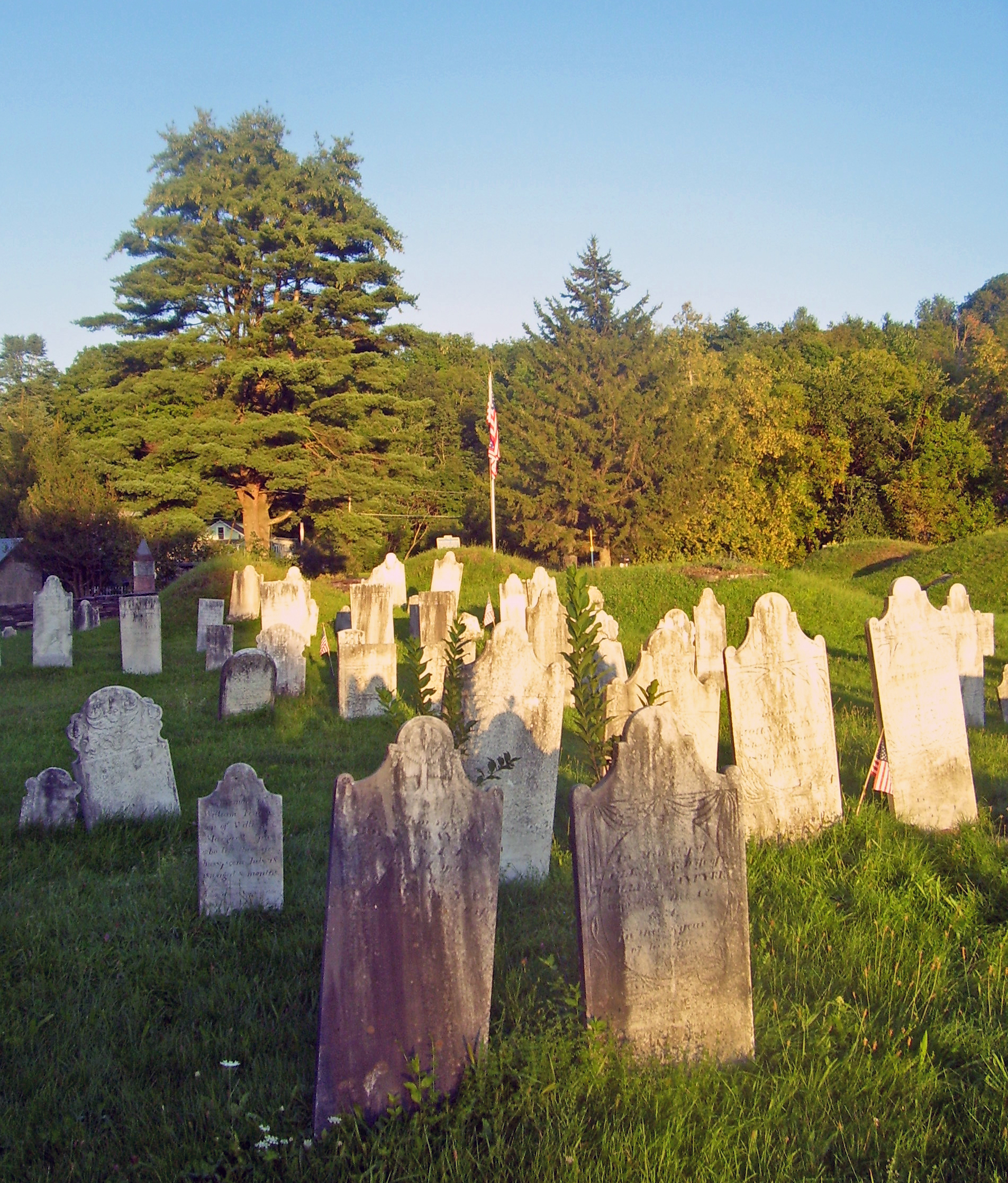
- Graves and burial mounds at rear, 2008
- Interactive map of Revolutionary War Cemetery

Details
- Established: 1767
- Location: 9 Archibald St., Salem, New York
- Country: United States
- Coordinates: 43°10′2″N 73°19′47″W
- Type: Public
- Owned by: Village of Salem
- Size: 2.6 acres (1.1 ha)
- No. of graves: 1,098
- Website: Salem, NY, Revolutionary War Cemetery
- Find a Grave: Revolutionary War Cemetery
- Revolutionary War Cemetery
- U.S. National Register of Historic Places
- NRHP reference No.: 04000822
- Added to NRHP: August 11, 2004

The Revolutionary War Cemetery, also called the Old Salem Burying Ground, is located on Archibald Street, just off state highway NY 22 in the village of Salem, New York, United States. It is a 2.6-acre (1.1 ha) area with over a thousand graves, at least 100 of which are those of Revolutionary War dead or veterans.

The cemetery was established prior to the war, but became known as a burial ground for casualties of the conflict when many were buried there, particularly after the nearby Battle of Saratoga, when a hundred bodies were reportedly put in one mass grave. More of the conflict's dead are buried here than in any other graveyard in Washington County, and possibly the state. The cemetery has suffered some neglect over the years, but that has slowly been reversed since it was listed on the National Register of Historic Places in 2003.

== Property ==
The cemetery is a roughly rectangular area surrounded by a slate fence, 3 feet (1 m) high by 2½ feet (76 cm) extending southwest from the south side of Archibald Street. On its south side is farmland. The neighborhood is residential and the houses across the street are small. The surrounding hills can be seen from the cemetery. It is generally flat with some mounds. It is just to the south of the village's historic district.

Outside the main entrance's two wrought iron gates (one for pedestrians and the other for carriages) on granite posts are two signs. One is a two-sided marble obelisk whose inscription honoring the veterans buried here indicates it was placed jointly by the town and state in 1935. It is considered a contributing object to the Register listing. The other sign, a blue-and-yellow historical marker similar to those used by the state, was placed by the village in 1961.

Past the entrance a wide path runs across the cemetery. It passes a cluster of mounded family vaults and then enters the main ground, with many marble headstones. The majority face east, the preferred orientation for graves in the 18th century. Their full number was not known until a Daughters of the American Revolution count in 1954 which put the number at 1,040, dating from 1767 to 1926. A recount in 1998 found 58 more, bringing the total to 1,098. Two more mounded family vaults are located against the rear wall. A fenced-off plot belonging to the Law family is against the north wall.

There are some footstones, and 10 slate table stones, but the majority are headstones. The earliest graves are clustered against the north side, including three in red sandstone, a rare material for 18th-century Washington County graveyards. Many of them have unusual stones with carved funerary art by Zeruabel Collins, a local stonecutter.

== History ==
The cemetery was founded a few years after Salem was first settled by a combination of migrants from Massachusetts and religious refugees from Ireland. The first known burial is Solomon Barr in 1767, the year the cemetery was formally established. Local legend has it that the next one was an unknown local Indian who wandered into the settlement and died. The earliest existing gravestone is that of Abram Savage, who died in 1767 at the age of 67.

Many of the early burials were people of regional historical significance. James Turner's family owned the Turner Patent, the local land grant. Joshua Conkey and his wife Dinah were both present at the nearby Battle of Bennington. St. John Honeywood was a Yale graduate who was the second principal of the local school. A poet and painter as well, his version of "Darby and Joan" is still anthologized today.

The local men buried in the cemetery who served in the war did so for the most part as members of the White Creek Militia, some later becoming part of the Continental Army. In addition to the nearby battles like Bennington and Saratoga, some saw action further from home at places like Monmouth. There are roughly a hundred known to have served. If the men supposedly buried in a mass grave after Saratoga were to be confirmed as buried here, that number would be doubled, making it one of the largest burial sites of Revolutionary War soldiers in the country.

Local stonecutter Zeruabel Collins is credited with 67 of the cemetery's stones, including Savage's, the first. Those use funerary art similar to that of his father, also a stonecutter. Later ones show his own style, characterized by a deeply cut face with prominent jaw, small wings arising from it, positioned above an intricate twisted scroll-like floral motif.

Also unusual in the cemetery are the sod-covered burial mounds. These were possibly a custom brought from Scotland or Ireland by that group of settlers. They are made of dry laid-up slate with an east-facing Roman arch sealed with stones and an iron gate. An empty one that has been examined suggests the masons took great care with their work.

In 1797 the town created a committee drawn from its two Presbyterian congregations to oversee the cemetery, hire a supervisor and build a fence to deter gravestone theft and illegal burials. It appears that this later task was not accomplished until 1871 when money was made available.

Thirty years later, in 1821, the cemetery received its oldest decedent, when 104-year-old James McNish, father of Lt. Alexander McNish, Esq., died September 17 and was laid to rest. Almost four decades after that, a new rural cemetery was opened west of the villages, and burials at the Revolutionary War Cemetery began to decline. After 1898, only one burial, that of John Gillis in 1923, took place, and then under special permit.

After the Register listing, in 1999, the Salem Cemetery Committee was formed to restore and oversee the Revolutionary War Cemetery as well as two others in the town. It took photographs of the gravestones and found that half of them had either been knocked over or were in danger of falling. Others were buried and overgrown, and a lightning strike later damaged a section of the wall. The committee has put out information brochures, compiled lists of those buried, put American flag holders next to the headstones of veterans, and promulgated regulations for the taking of stone rubbings.

== See also ==
- List of cemeteries in New York
- National Register of Historic Places listings in Westchester County, New York
