= Hudson Falls Historic District =

Historic district in New York, United States

- U.S. National Register of Historic Places
- U.S. Historic district
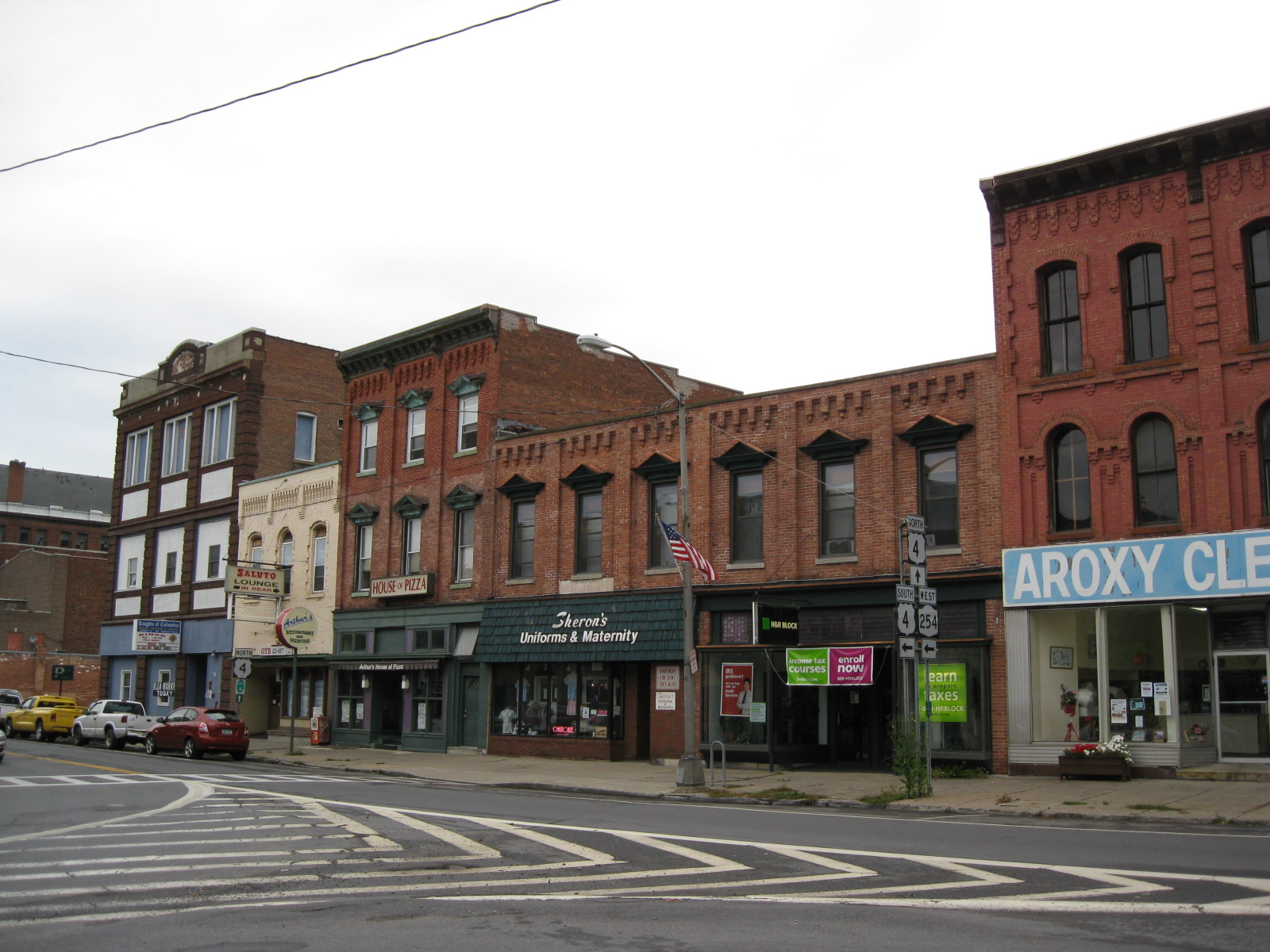
- Hudson Falls Historic District, September 2009

- Location within New York Location within the United States
- Location: Roughly bounded by Oak, Mechanic, River, Maple and Main Sts., Hudson Falls, New York
- Coordinates: 43°18′0″N 73°35′9″W
- Area: 41 acres (17 ha)
- Built: 1812-1935
- Architect: Multiple
- Architectural style: Late 19th And 20th Century Revivals, Late Victorian
- NRHP reference No.: 83001825
- Added to NRHP: September 15, 1983

Hudson Falls Historic District is a national historic district located at Hudson Falls in Washington County, New York. It includes 148 contributing buildings, one contributing site, and two contributing objects. It encompasses the historic center of the village including residential, commercial, civic, and ecclesiastical buildings, centered on the village park. The buildings were built between 1812 and 1935, the majority between 1875 and 1900, and reflect a variety of 19th and early-20th-century architectural styles. Located within the district is the former Washington County Courthouse (1873) and the separately listed US Post Office-Hudson Falls. One of the oldest structures is a law office building constructed about 1810 and located at 177 Main Street. It is notable as having been the office for Henry C. Martindale (1780-1860) and his clerk, New York Governor Silas Wright (1795-1847).

It was listed on the National Register of Historic Places in 1983.

== Gallery ==
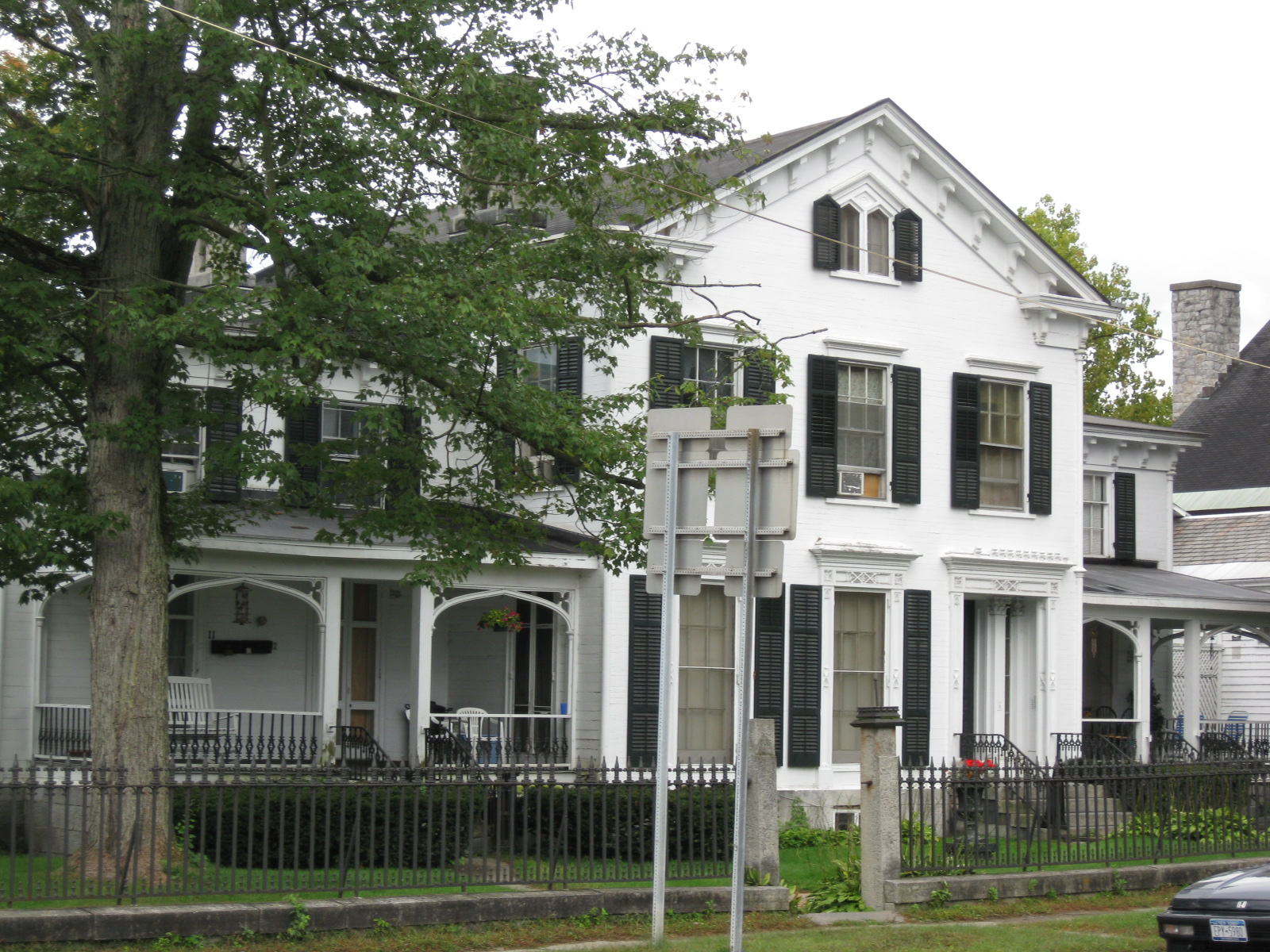
"Springside" (ca. 1815), September 2009

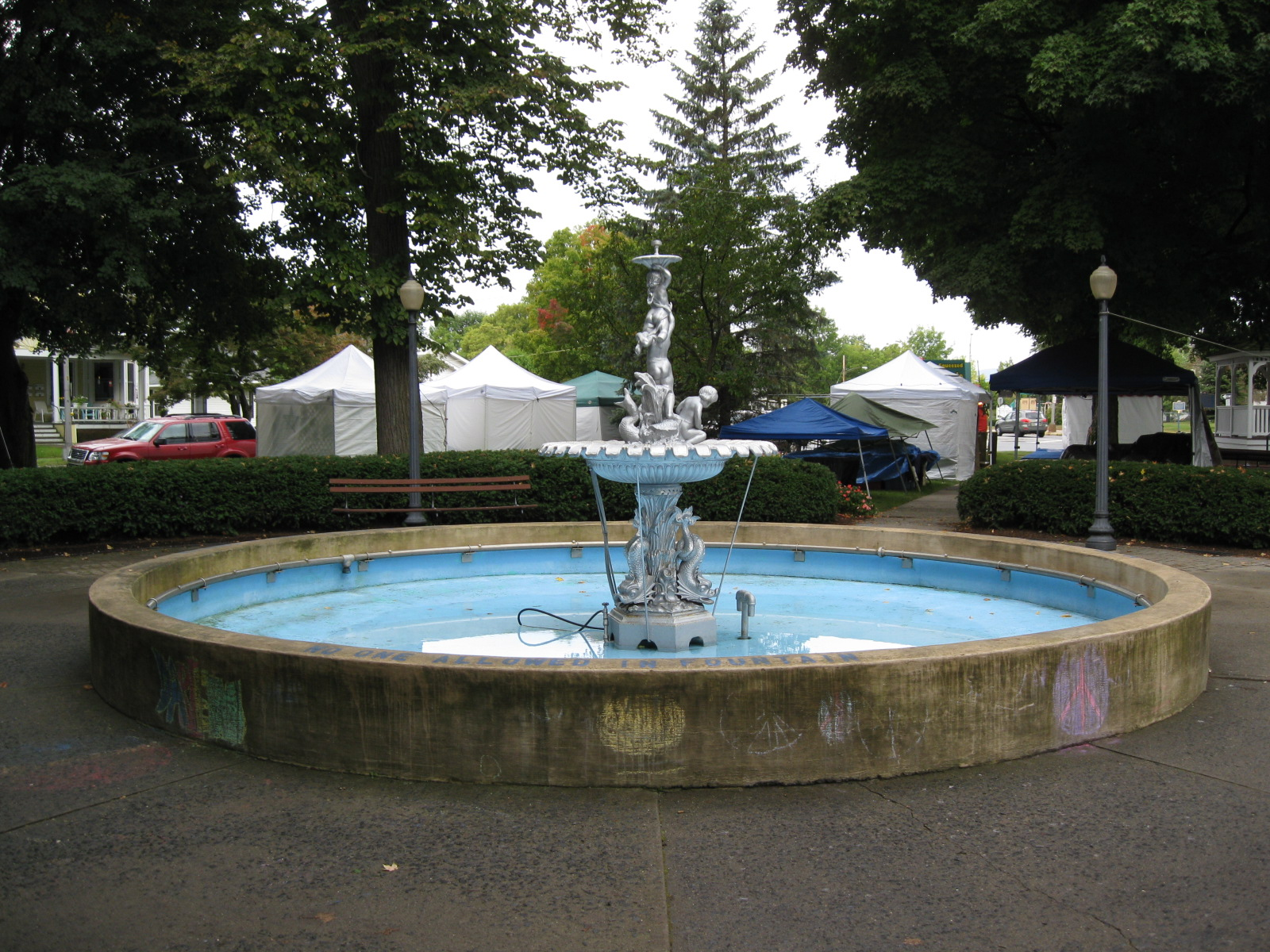
Fountain in Village Park, September 2009

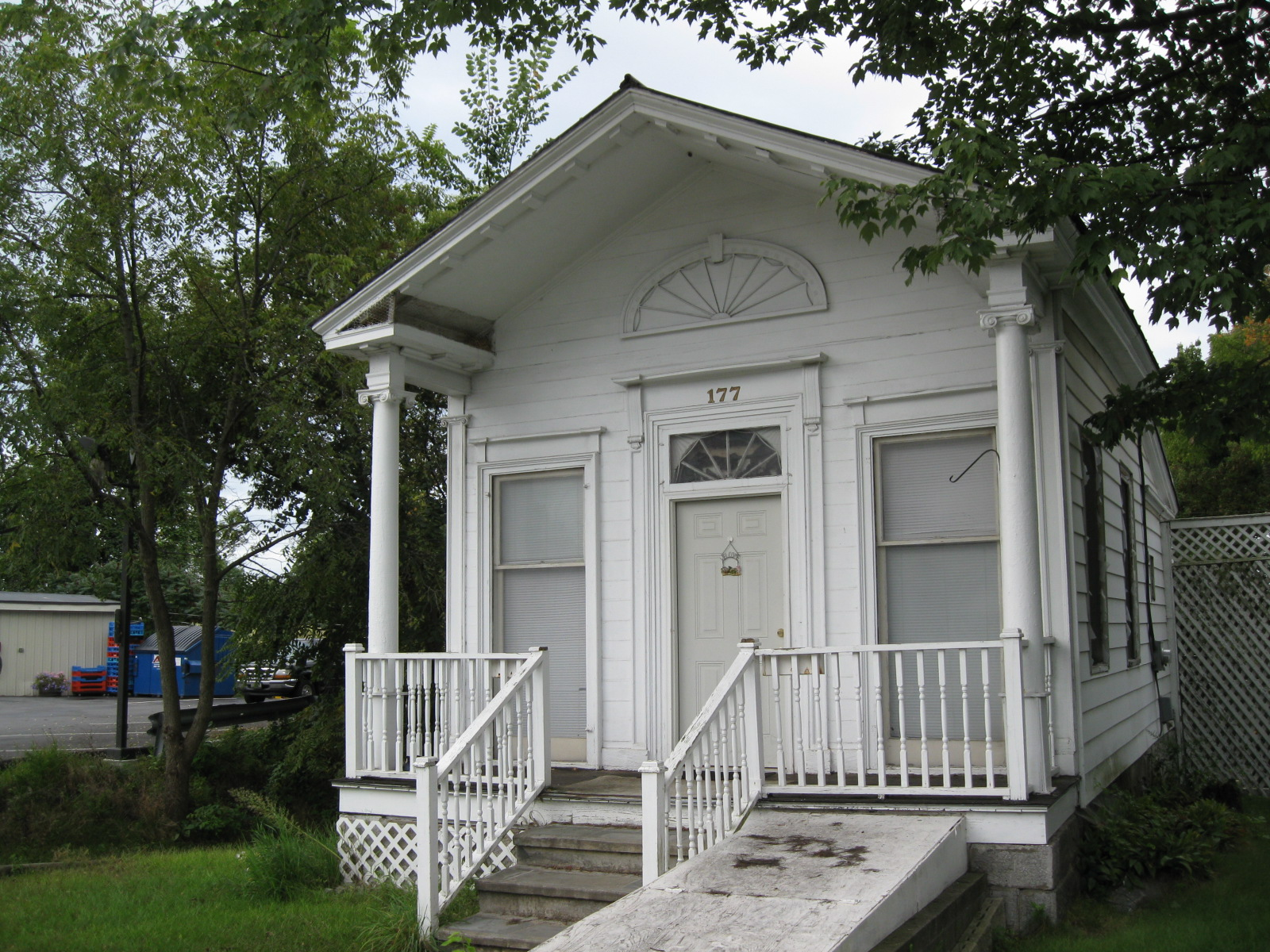
Law Office (ca. 1810), September 2009

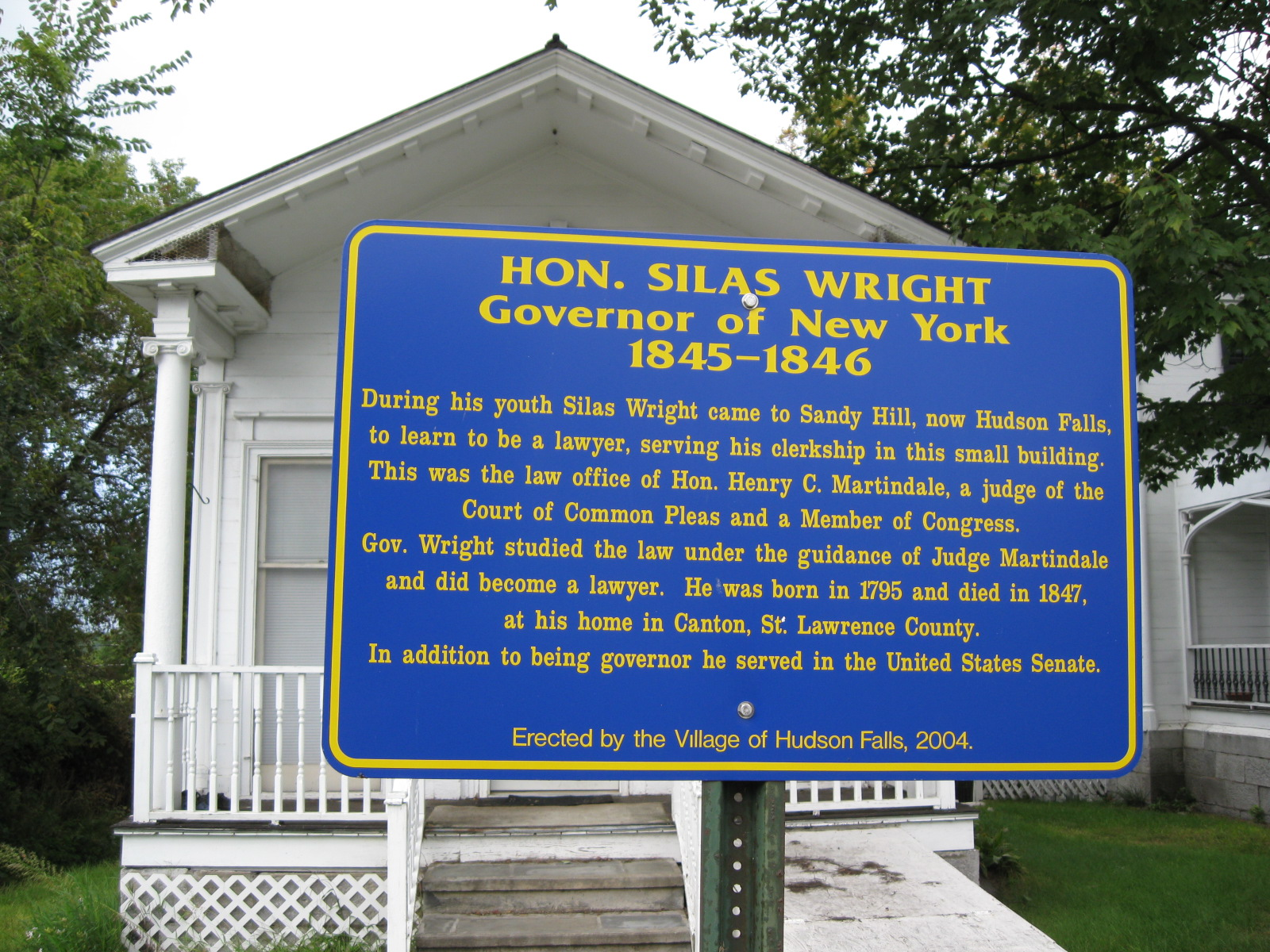
Historical Marker for Law Office, September 2009
