= Brown's Tavern =

Historic commercial building in New York, United States

- U.S. National Register of Historic Places
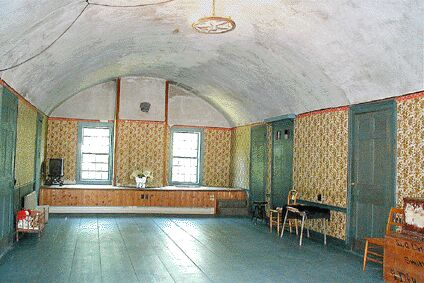
- The ballroom at the tavern,

- Location within New York Location within the United States
- Location: 7755 NY 40, South Hartford, New York
- Coordinates: 43°20′41″N 73°24′35″W
- Area: 1.4 acres (0.57 ha)
- Built: 1802
- Architect: Brown, Caleb
- Architectural style: Federal
- NRHP reference No.: 00001154
- Added to NRHP: September 22, 2000

Brown's Tavern is a historic tavern and farm complex located at South Hartford in Washington County, New York. The property includes the 1802 Brown's Tavern, an 1878 horse barn, outhouse, corn crib, well and pump, and store and sheds foundations. The tavern building is a rectangular, 2 1/2-story, five by three bay, high-pitched gable roof building measuring 47 feet wide and 37 feet deep. The interior features a noted ballroom. It includes Federal style details, but was renovated about 1878–1880 in a regional eclectic style.

It was listed on the National Register of Historic Places in 2000.
