= Farmer's National Bank and W.H. Hughes Slate Company Office =

Historic commercial building in New York, United States

- U.S. National Register of Historic Places
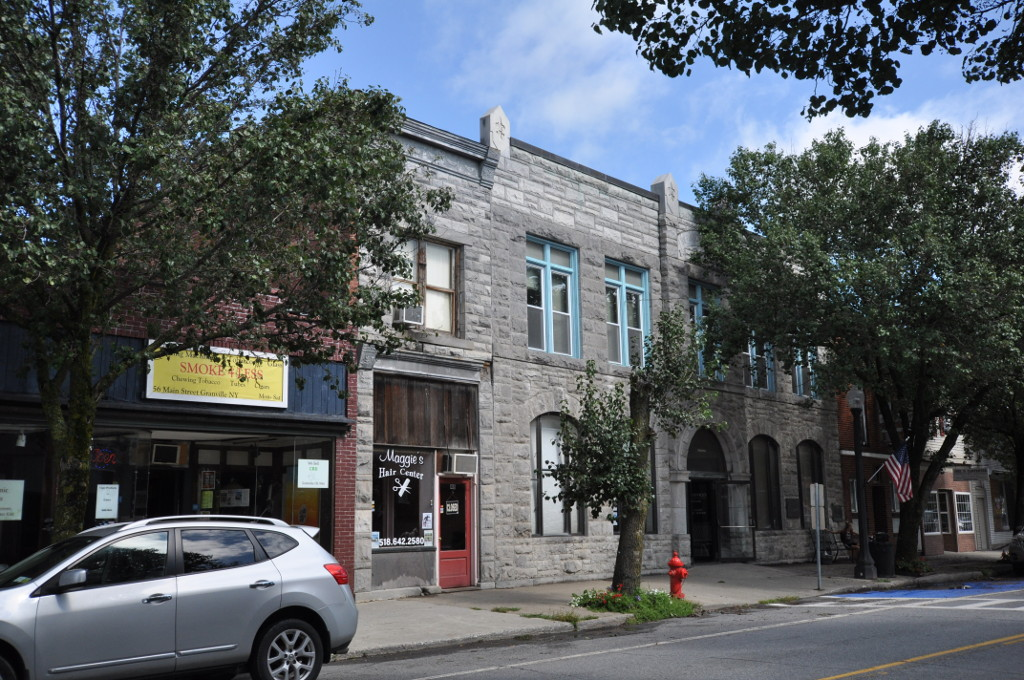

- Location within New York Location within the United States
- Location: 44-46 Main St., Granville, New York
- Coordinates: 43°24′27″N 73°15′46″W
- Area: 0.13 acres (0.053 ha)
- Built: 1891, c. 1912-1943
- Built by: Wilson, Ashley S.
- Architectural style: Romanesque Revival
- NRHP reference No.: 14000330
- Added to NRHP: June 13, 2014

Farmer's National Bank and W.H. Hughes Slate Company Office, also known as the Granville Town Hall, is a historic commercial building located at Granville, Washington County, New York. The original section was built in 1891, and expanded twice between about 1912 and 1943. It is a two-story, five-bay, cut limestone and brick building with a Romanesque style arched entrance. It has housed Granville town offices since about 1945.

It was added to the National Register of Historic Places in 2014.
