= Baker-Merrill House =

Historic house in New York, United States

- U.S. National Register of Historic Places
- Location within New York Location within the United States
- Location: 38 Grove Rd., Easton, New York
- Coordinates: 42°59′28″N 73°33′6″W
- Area: 1.8 acres (0.73 ha)
- Architectural style: Greek Revival, Italianate
- NRHP reference No.: 06000650
- Added to NRHP: July 26, 2006

The Baker-Merrill House is a historic house located at 38 Grove Road in Easton, Washington County, New York.

== Description and history ==
The house was built in the Federal and Greek Revival styles of architecture.

It was listed on the National Register of Historic Places on July 26, 2006.
