= Stoops Hotel =

- U.S. National Register of Historic Places
- Location within New York Location within the United States
- Location: 2839 NY 29, Battenville, New York
- Coordinates: 43°6′56.3″N 73°25′20.07″W
- Area: 4.33 acres (1.75 ha)
- Built: 1795
- Architectural style: Federal, Greek Revival
- NRHP reference No.: 09000481
- Added to NRHP: June 30, 2009

Stoops Hotel is a historic tavern and hotel located at Battenville in Washington County, New York. It was built in two phases, with the oldest phase built between about 1790 and 1800. It is a timber-frame building of vernacular design with Federal and Greek Revival details. It is located across from the Stoops Brinkman House and next to the Susan B. Anthony Childhood House.

It was listed on the National Register of Historic Places in 2009.
