= Burton Hall (Greenwich, New York) =

- U.S. National Register of Historic Places
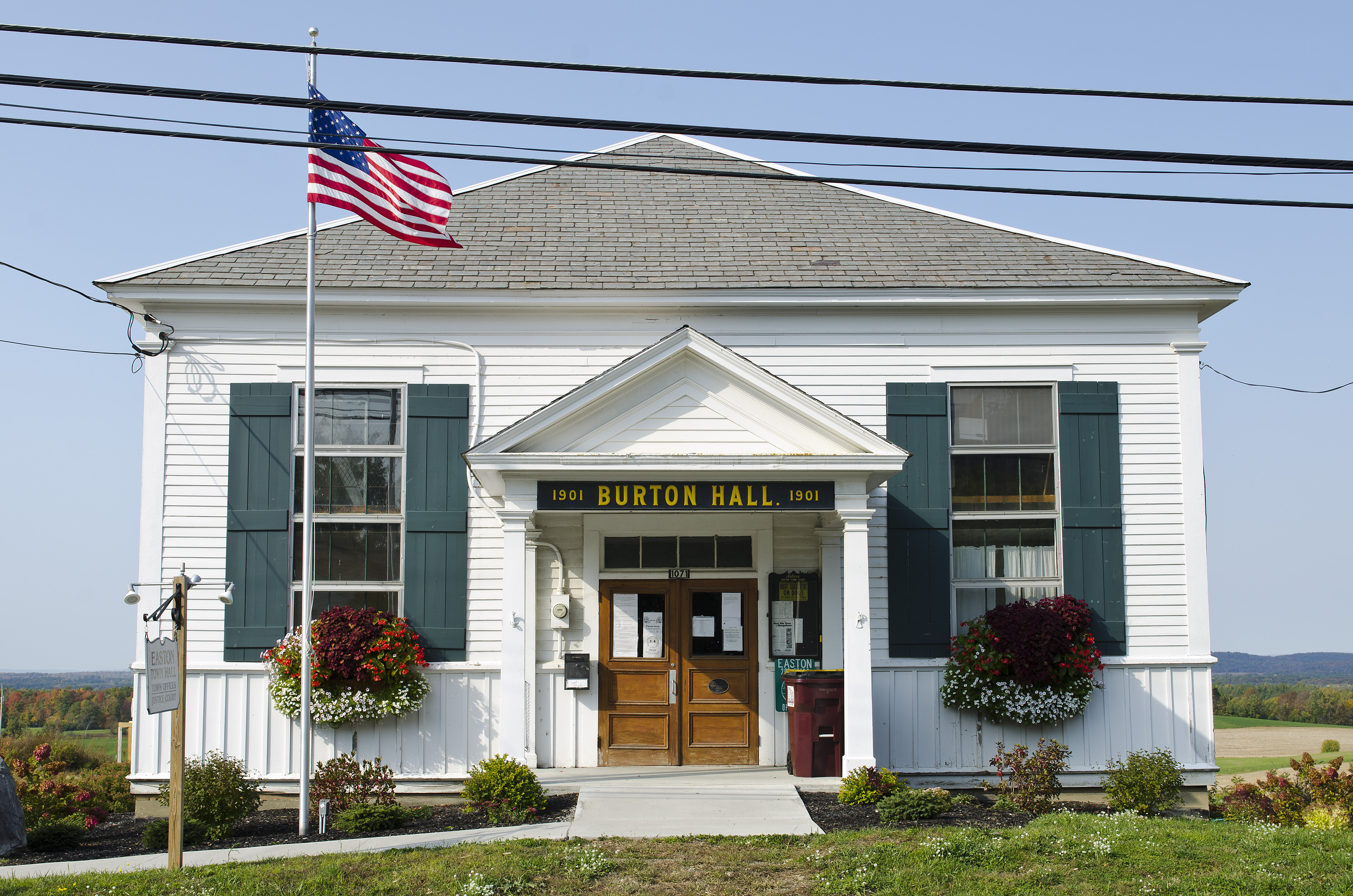

- Location within New York Location within the United States
- Location: 1071 NY 40, North Easton, New York
- Coordinates: 43°06′13″N 73°31′30″W
- Area: 0.83 acres (0.34 ha)
- Built: 1901
- Built by: Dodds, Horace; Walsh, D.
- Architect: Brezee, R. Newton
- Architectural style: Colonial Revival, Classical Revival
- NRHP reference No.: 15000610
- Added to NRHP: September 17, 2015

Burton Hall, also known as the Easton Town Hall, is a historic commercial building located at North Easton, Washington County, New York. It was built in 1901, and is a one-story, rectangular frame building with Colonial Revival and Classical Revival style design elements. It has a slate-shingled hip roof and is sheathed in horizontal clapboard. It was built through efforts of a local philanthropist Isaac A. Burton to serve as a place of assembly for residents of the Town of Easton.

It was added to the National Register of Historic Places in 2015.
