= Battenville, New York =

Hamlet in New York, United States

Coordinates: 43°06′32″N 73°25′25″W

Battenville is a hamlet in Washington County on the south town line of Greenwich, New York, located on the Batten Kill in eastern New York. It is most known as the childhood home of Susan B. Anthony, who moved at the age of six with her family to Battenville from Adams, Massachusetts. The family later moved near Rochester in the western part of the state. Anthony became renowned as a women's rights activist and suffragist.

The Susan B. Anthony Childhood House is state-owned and is listed on the National Register of Historic Places. The Thomas McLean House and Stoops Hotel are also listed on the National Register of Historic Places.

== Climate ==
This climatic region is typified by large seasonal temperature differences, with warm to hot (and often humid) summers and cold (sometimes severely cold) winters. According to the Köppen Climate Classification system, Battenville has a humid continental climate, abbreviated "Dfb" on climate maps.
