= Village of Greenwich Historic District =

Historic district in New York, United States

- U.S. National Register of Historic Places
- U.S. Historic district
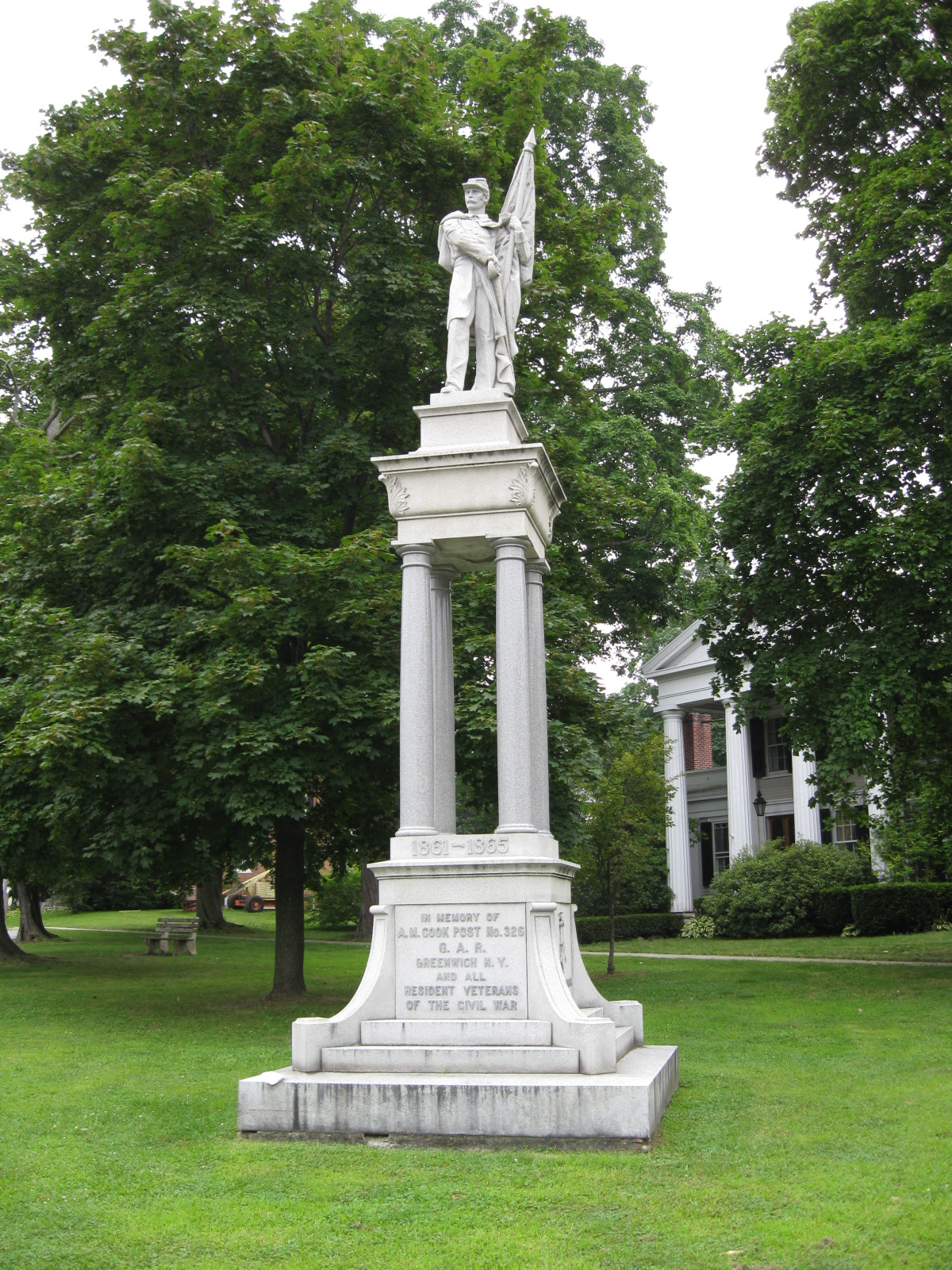
- Civil War Monument at Monument Park, August 2009

- Location within New York Location within the United States
- Location: Roughly, along Academy, Church, Cottage, Gray, Main, Prospect and Salem Sts. and Washington Sq., Town of Greenwich, Greenwich, New York
- Coordinates: 43°5′30″N 73°29′55″W
- Area: 98 acres (40 ha)
- Built: 1804
- Architect: Griffin, A. R.; et al.
- Architectural style: Federal, Greek Revival, Late Victorian
- NRHP reference No.: 95001025
- Added to NRHP: August 31, 1995

Village of Greenwich Historic District is a national historic district located at Greenwich in Washington County, New York. It includes 165 contributing buildings, six contributing sites (parks), one contributing structure, and 27 contributing objects. It encompasses the historic center of the village including residential, commercial, civic, and ecclesiastical buildings as well as six memorial parks, including Monument Park containing the Civil War monument (1916). The majority of the buildings were built between 1840 and 1900 and reflect a variety of 19th- and early-20th-century architectural styles.

It was listed on the National Register of Historic Places in 1995.
