= Easton, New York =

Easton
- Town
- Location in Washington County and the state of New York.
- Coordinates: 43°1′49″N 73°32′14″W
- Country: United States
- State: New York
- County: Washington

Area
  - Total: 63.21 sq mi (163.71 km^{2})
  - Land: 62.28 sq mi (161.30 km^{2})
  - Water: 0.93 sq mi (2.42 km^{2})
- Elevation: 548 ft (167 m)

Population (2020)
  - Total: 2,279
- Time zone: UTC-5 (Eastern (EST))
  - Summer (DST): UTC-4 (EDT)
- Area code: 518
- FIPS code: 36-22656
- GNIS feature ID: 0978920
- Website: https://www.eastonny.gov/

Easton is a town in southwestern Washington County, New York, United States along the county's western boundary. It is part of the Glens Falls Metropolitan Statistical Area. The town population was 2,279 at the 2020 census. The town adopted English as its official language on July 6, 2010.

== History ==
The town of East was formed in 1789 from the towns of Saratoga and Stillwater. The Baker-Merrill House and DeRidder Homestead are listed on the National Register of Historic Places.

== Geography ==
The western town line is defined by the Hudson River with Saratoga County on the opposite bank. The southern town line is the border of Rensselaer County.

According to the United States Census Bureau, the town has a total area of 63.2 square miles (164 km^{2}), of which 62.3 square miles (161 km^{2}) is land and 0.9 square miles (2.3 km^{2}) (1.44%) is water.

NY Route 40 is a north–south highway through the center of Easton, and NY Route 29 crosses the northern section of the town.

== Demographics ==
Historical population
Census	Pop.	Note	%±
1820	3,051		—
1830	3,753		23.0%
1840	2,988		−20.4%
1850	3,225		7.9%
1860	3,083		−4.4%
1870	3,072		−0.4%
1880	2,740		−10.8%
1890	2,500		−8.8%
1900	2,247		−10.1%
1910	2,133		−5.1%
1920	1,851		−13.2%
1930	1,726		−6.8%
1940	1,691		−2.0%
1950	1,659		−1.9%
1960	1,681		1.3%
1970	1,956		16.4%
1980	2,020		3.3%
1990	2,203		9.1%
2000	2,259		2.5%
2010	2,336		3.4%
2020	2,279		−2.4%
U.S. Decennial Census

As of the census of 2000, there were 2,259 people, 854 households, and 642 families residing in the town. The population density was 36.3 inhabitants per square mile (14.0/km^{2}). There were 953 housing units at an average density of 15.3 per square mile (5.9/km^{2}). The racial makeup of the town was 98.54% White, 0.53% African American, 0.09% Asian, and 0.84% from two or more races. Hispanic or Latino of any race were 0.71% of the population.

There were 854 households, out of which 33.7% had children under the age of 18 living with them, 63.5% were married couples living together, 6.1% had a female householder with no husband present, and 24.8% were non-families. 19.8% of all households were made up of individuals, and 7.4% had someone living alone who was 65 years of age or older. The average household size was 2.63 and the average family size was 3.03.

In the town, the population was spread out, with 25.7% under the age of 18, 5.6% from 18 to 24, 28.1% from 25 to 44, 26.4% from 45 to 64, and 14.2% who were 65 years of age or older. The median age was 39 years. For every 100 females, there were 102.6 males. For every 100 females age 18 and over, there were 102.4 males.

The median income for a household in the town was $43,194, and the median income for a family was $48,947. Males had a median income of $32,428 versus $24,569 for females. The per capita income for the town was $19,998. About 3.4% of families and 6.6% of the population were below the poverty line, including 7.2% of those under age 18 and none of those age 65 or over.

== Communities and locations in Easton ==
=== Communities ===
- Archdale – A hamlet in the northeastern part of town on County Road 74.
- Barkers Grove – A hamlet in the southern section of the town on NY-40.
- Crandall Corners – A hamlet in the southwestern part of the town on NY-40 at County Road 54
- Easton – A hamlet located on NY-40, south of North Easton.
- Vly Summit – A hamlet at the eastern town line, mainly in the town of Cambridge.
- Greenwich – A village along the northern town line that is also partially within the town of Greenwich.
- Middle Falls – A hamlet at the northern town line, mainly in the Town of Greenwich. The Easton Friends North Meetinghouse was listed on the National Register of Historic Places in 2005.
- North Easton – A hamlet on NY-40 near the center of the town. Burton Hall was listed on the National Register of Historic Places in 2015.
- South Easton – A hamlet east of Barkers Grove.
- Washington County Fairgrounds – A location west of the village of Greenwich.

=== Geographical locations ===
- Battenkill – A tributary of the Hudson River that marks the northern town line.
- Ensign Brook – A small stream in the southern part of the town, emptying into the Hudson River.
- Fly Creek – A small stream running northward from the eastern town line.
- Willard Mountain – A small mountain and ski area near the center of the town, just east of Route 40.

== Notable person ==
- Martin Harris (1783–1875) was born in Easton.
