= DeRidder Homestead =

Historic house in New York, United States

- U.S. National Register of Historic Places
- Location within New York Location within the United States
- Location: E of Schuylerville off NY 29, Easton, New York
- Coordinates: 43°5′57″N 73°34′4″W
- Area: 7.4 acres (3.0 ha)
- Built: 1735
- Architectural style: Federal
- NRHP reference No.: 74001315
- Added to NRHP: March 22, 1974

DeRidder Homestead is a historic home located at Easton in Washington County, New York. It consists of a two-story, three by two bay, brick main block with a one-story rear wing. The earliest part of the house dates to about 1735. Also on the property is a barn and several outbuildings.

It was listed on the National Register of Historic Places in 1974.
