= Easton Friends North Meetinghouse =

Historic church in New York, United States

- U.S. National Register of Historic Places
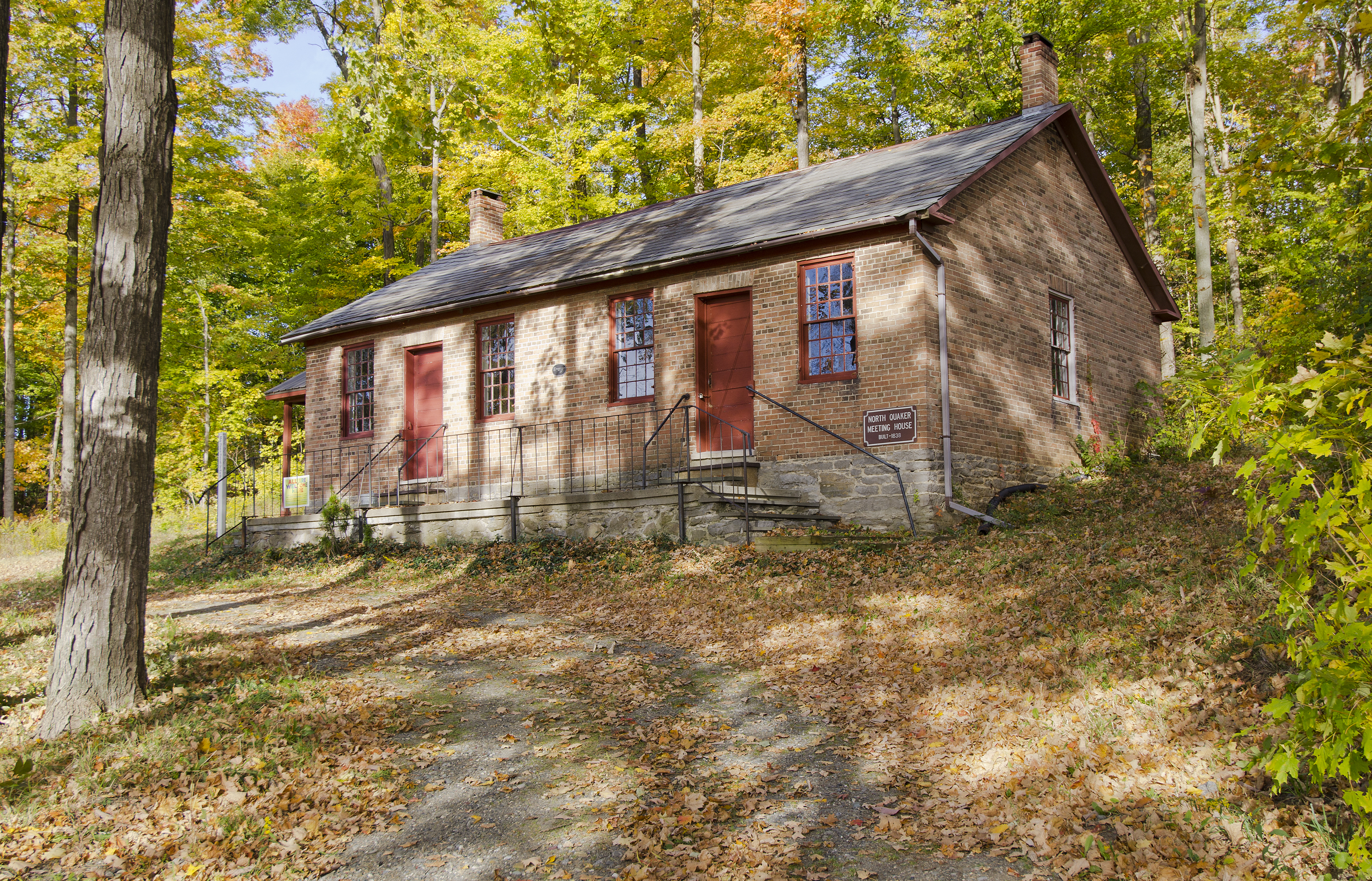

- Location within New York Location within the United States
- Nearest city: Middle Falls, New York
- Coordinates: 43°3′25″N 73°32′4″W
- Area: less than one acre
- Built: 1838
- NRHP reference No.: 05001132
- Added to NRHP: October 5, 2005

Easton Friends North Meetinghouse is a historic Quaker meeting house located at North Easton in Washington County, New York. It was built in 1838 and is a one-story, rectangular brick structure with a gable roof.

It was listed on the National Register of Historic Places in 2005.
