= Salem (hamlet), New York =

Salem, New York
- Hamlet and CDP
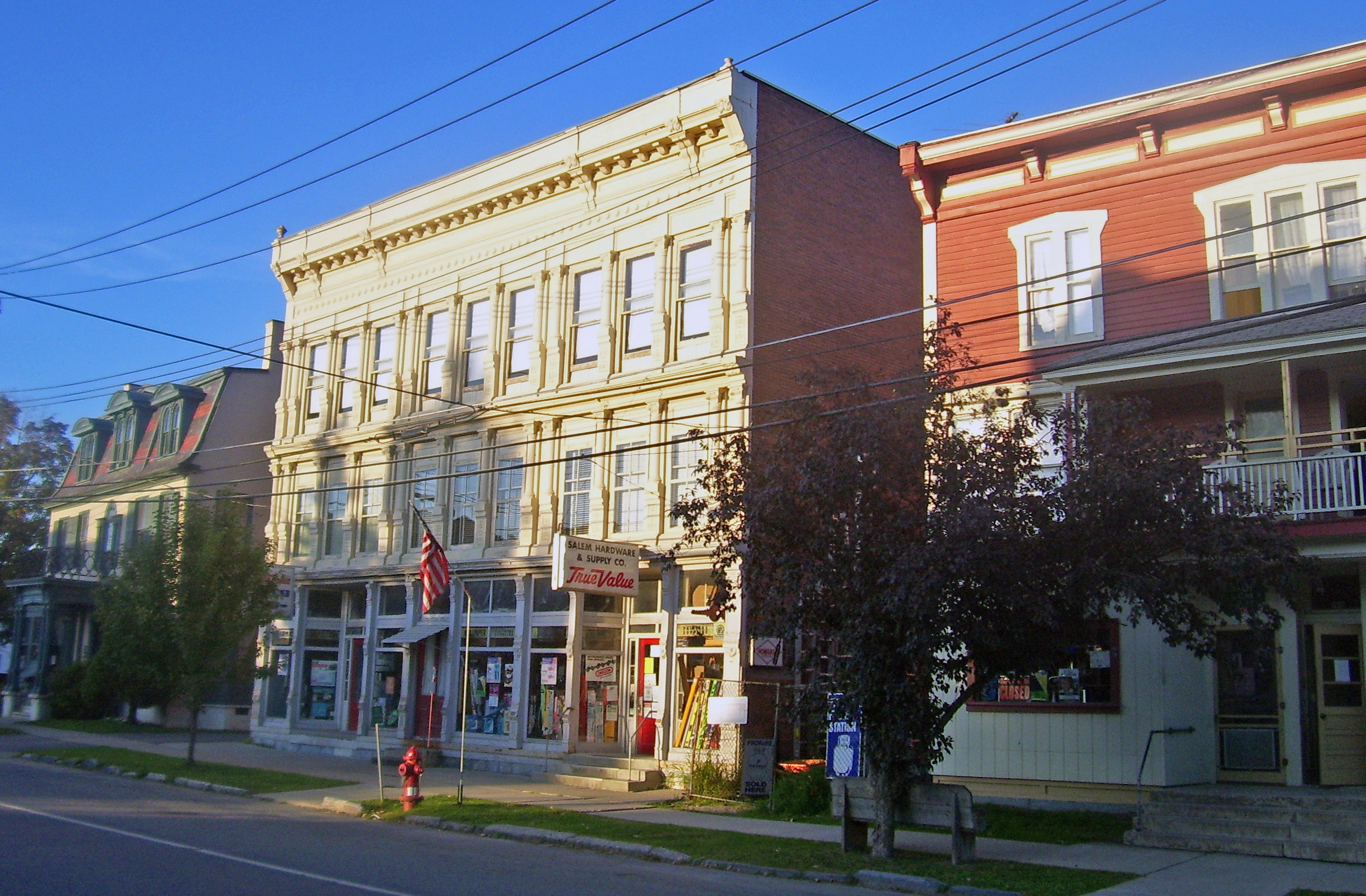
- Buildings on North Main Street downtown

- Location in Washington County and the state of New York.

- Location of New York in the United States
- Coordinates: 43°10′23″N 73°19′42″W
- Country: United States
- State: New York
- County: Washington
- Settled: 1761
- Incorporated: April 4, 1803
- Dissolved: March 31, 2016

Area
  - Total: 2.93 sq mi (7.60 km^{2})
  - Land: 2.93 sq mi (7.60 km^{2})
  - Water: 0 sq mi (0.00 km^{2})

Population (2020)
  - Total: 811
  - Density: 276.5/sq mi (106.74/km^{2})
- Time zone: UTC-5 (Eastern (EST))
  - Summer (DST): UTC-4 (EDT)
- ZIP code: 12865
- Area code: 518
- FIPS code: 36-64771
- 0964292: 0964292

Salem is a hamlet (and census-designated place) located in the town of Salem in Washington County, New York, United States. It is part of the Glens Falls Metropolitan Statistical Area. The population was 946 at the 2010 census.

The hamlet is located in the north central part of Town of Salem, at the junction of New York State Route 22 and Washington County routes 30 and 153. It was an incorporated village from 1803 to 2016. Part of the county government was located here, including the jail and the Sheriff's Department. The courthouse, formerly housing the jail, remains a historical landmark in the town. It was built from an E.F. Cummings design in 1869 and remained as the jail until 2004. The Sheriff's Department opened its new sub-station south of the community on Route 22 in August 2007.

Government offices for the Town of Salem are located in the hamlet.

== History ==
The community was settled in 1762 by settlers from New England and Scotland while still part of Albany County. Salem was incorporated as a village in 1803.

The Salem Historic District and Revolutionary War Cemetery are listed on the National Register of Historic Places.

Residents voted in favor, 192 to 49, of dissolving the Village of Salem on August 5, 2014. A final dissolution plan was adopted and passed on April 16, 2015. The village officially dissolved on March 31, 2016. It should be classified as a census-designated place by the U.S. Census Bureau within the next couple years. All government activities previously managed by the village are now handled by the Town of Salem.

== Geography ==
According to the United States Census Bureau, the hamlet has a total area of 2.9 square miles (7.6 km^{2})

NY Route 22 (Main Street) passes through the hamlet and intersects County Roads 30 and 153.

== Demographics ==
Historical population
| Census | Pop. | Note | %± |
|---|---|---|---|
| 1900 | 1,391 | | — |
| 1910 | 1,250 | | −10.1% |
| 1920 | 1,083 | | −13.4% |
| 1930 | 1,081 | | −0.2% |
| 1940 | 1,034 | | −4.3% |
| 1950 | 1,067 | | 3.2% |
| 1960 | 1,076 | | 0.8% |
| 1970 | 1,025 | | −4.7% |
| 1980 | 959 | | −6.4% |
| 1990 | 958 | | −0.1% |
| 2000 | 964 | | 0.6% |
| 2010 | 946 | | −1.9% |
| 2020 | 811 | | −14.3% |
U.S. Decennial Census

As of the census of 2000, there were 964 people, 363 households, and 257 families residing in what was then village. The population density was 329.2 inhabitants per square mile (127.1/km^{2}). There were 412 housing units at an average density of 54.3 persons/km^{2} (140.7 persons/sq mi). The racial makeup of the village was 97.61% white, 1.14% black, 0.10% Native American, 0.10% from other races, and 1.04% from two or more races. 0.62% of the population were Hispanic or Latino of any race.

There were 363 households, out of which 34.4% had children under the age of 18 living with them, 51.0% were married couples living together, 14.0% have a woman whose husband does not live with her, and 29.2% were non-families. 25.9% of all households were made up of individuals, and 12.7% had someone living alone who was 65 years of age or older. The average household size was 2.51 and the average family size was 2.98.

In the village, the population was spread out, with 26.3% under the age of 18, 7.8% from 18 to 24, 27.5% from 25 to 44, 23.3% from 45 to 64, and 15.0% who were 65 years of age or older. The median age was 38 years. For every 100 females, there were 101.3 males. For every 100 females age 18 and over, there were 91.9 males.

The median income for a household in the village was $37,357, and the median income for a family was $44,375. Males had a median income of $31,625 versus $23,500 for females. The per capita income for the village was $19,233. 4.5% of the population and 4.2% of families were below the poverty line. Out of the total people living in poverty, 4.5% are under the age of 18 and 4.3% are 65 or older.

== Notable people ==
- David Rumsey (New York politician), former US Congressman
- Samuel Stevens, Adjutant General of New York
