= Salem Historic District (New York) =

Historic district in New York, United States

- U.S. National Register of Historic Places
- U.S. Historic district
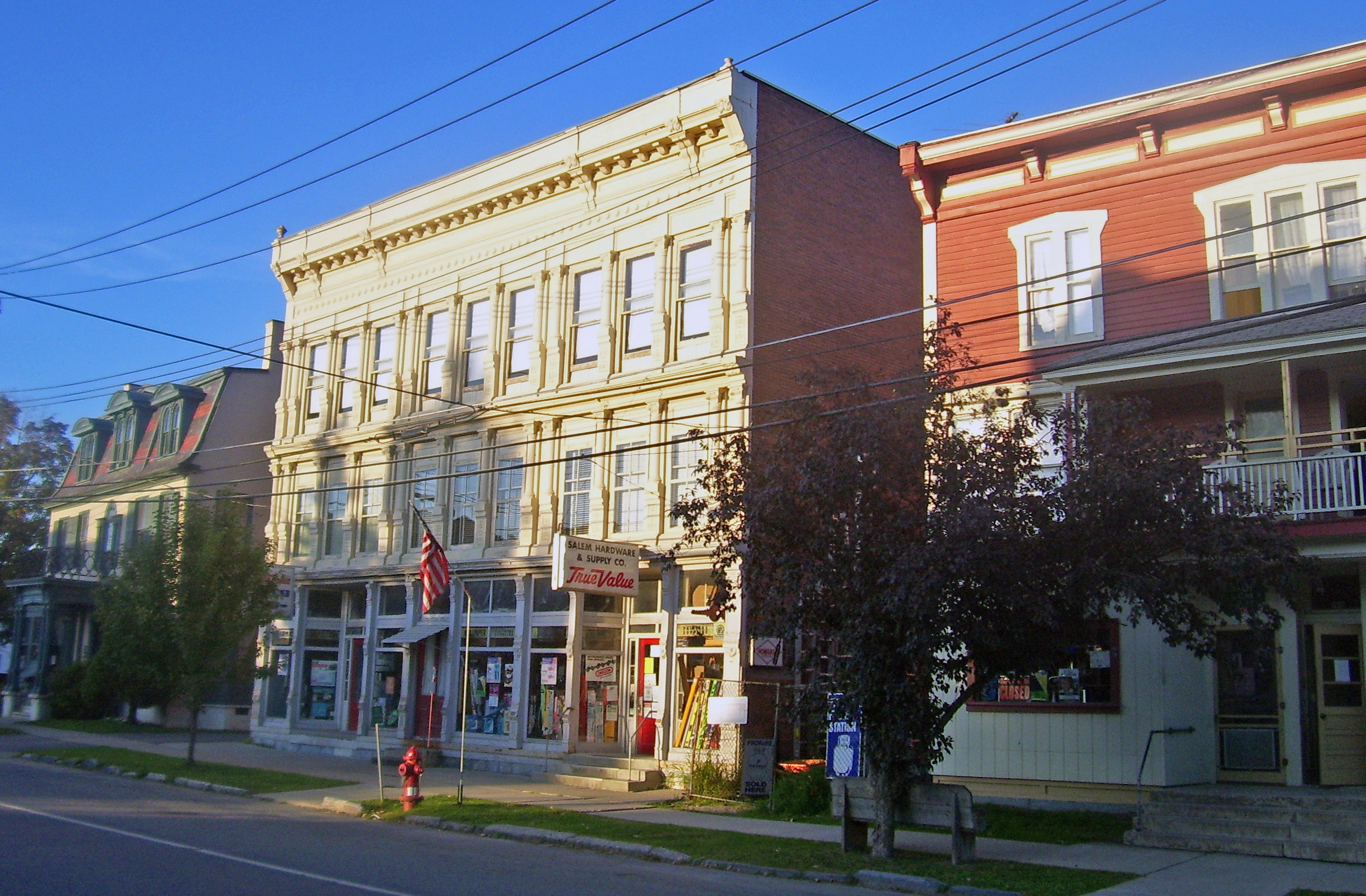
- Buildings on Main Street, 2008
- Location: Salem, NY
- Nearest city: Hudson Falls
- Coordinates: 43°10′20″N 73°19′38″W
- Area: 22 acres (8.9 ha)
- Built: late 19th and early 20th century
- Architectural style: Various
- NRHP reference No.: 75001234
- Added to NRHP: May 28, 1975

The Salem Historic District is located along Main Street (NY 22) and Broadway (Washington County routes 30 and 153) in Salem, New York, United States. It is a 22-acre (8.9 ha) area containing 79 buildings.

Most of the buildings date to the 19th and early 20th centuries, and some represent important milestones in the history of Salem, possibly the oldest continuously inhabited village in the county and one of the first in the state to incorporate. The buildings that survived a devastating 1840 fire have been preserved relatively intact. In 1975 the area was recognized as a historic district and listed on the National Register of Historic Places.

== Geography ==
The district is cross-shaped. It includes all properties on either side of Main from the former Delaware and Hudson Railroad tracks on the north end to Park Place at the south. The railroad tracks' intersection with County Route 30 also serve as the western boundary, with the former county courthouse being the eastern limit along County Route 153. The boundary extends 200 feet (61 m) from the roads.

This area of 22 acres (8.9 ha) includes 79 buildings, all but ten of which date to the late 19th century. The portions of Main Street and Broadway east of it are densely developed, with commercial properties near the center yielding to residences away from them. Route 153 is less dense, with mature trees forming a buffer leading to the county courthouse complex and Salem High School.

== History ==
Salem was first settled around 1761 by three men from Pelham, Massachusetts, making it one of the earliest settlements in the county. The site of their log cabins, long since gone, is now occupied by the Abrams Building on North Main Street. They brought their families along three years later, and obtained a patent for 25,000 acres (10,000 ha) of land in the area from the colonial governor after promising two colonial officials that they would give those officials half of the land. At the time the area was part of a larger subdivision known as Charlotte County.

Those two officials sold their half to an Irish minister who had brought his followers to the North American colonies to escape religious persecution. This led to the construction of a schoolhouse and church, the first in the county and one of only two at the time north of Albany. The two groups lived in relative harmony.

Shortly after the Revolutionary War began, in 1777, General Philip Schuyler of the Continental Army ordered the town evacuated in the face of John Burgoyne's advances into the area during the Saratoga Campaign. Some of the men stayed behind, dismantling the schoolhouse's logs to erect Fort Salem around the site of the First Presbyterian Church on East Broadway. It was burned in September of that year by local Loyalists.

One local man, John Williams, raised a local regiment and distinguished himself as a leader during the war and was eventually commissioned a colonel. At the war's end he retired with the rank of brigadier general and built a large house on what is now East Broadway. For many years it was the largest and most elaborate in the village.

The oldest surviving house in the village, the Judge Blanchard home on East Broadway, is the only building to show clear influence of the Georgian architectural style common before the Revolution. It is a frame building on a raised foundation with symmetrical fenestration and a Palladian window above the entrance. It was built in 1790, before the emergence of the Federal style, exemplified by the Judge McLean home further down the street with its elliptical fanlight and sidelights at the main entrance.

The next year, Washington Academy was founded, the sixth school in the state to be formally incorporated. In 1803 Salem was incorporated as a village, one of the first in the state. Eight years later, a new school building was built on West Broadway, the first of several on the site.

Many other early buildings, and the records of Salem's early history, were destroyed by a large fire in 1840. An ultimate result of this was the construction of the Proudfit Building at the junction of the two routes, which serves as municipal offices, public library, theater and headquarters for the fire and police departments. It was built with $10,000 left to the village for the purpose by a local bank president, on the condition that matching funds be raised. The Proudfit family contributed half of those funds and the building was named after them out of gratitude.

In 1939 the school district was centralized. The last of the school buildings downtown was converted into apartments, and a new building was built on the grounds of the former Williams estate.

== Significant contributing properties ==
- Judge Blanchard House, East Broadway. Dating to 1790, this is the oldest house in the village. It shows a strong Georgian influence.
- First Presbyterian Church, East Broadway. Its front portico with full-height Doric columns is one of the strongest Greek Revival buildings in the village.
- Proudfit Building, West Broadway and South Main Street. Built in 1890, this ornate brick and stucco structure serves as village hall, the public library and a theater. It has been considered the center of the village since it was first built.
- Proudfit-Sherman House, East Broadway. The best Greek Revival house in the village has a front portico similar to the Presbyterian church's except with Ionic columns.
- Washington County Courthouse, West Broadway. Except for the removal of the bell tower, this ornate brick structure is as it was when built in 1869.

== Preservation ==
In 2008 the village government created a Historic Preservation Commission to preserve the historic character of the district. It consists of five members appointed by the mayor serving staggered three-year terms. Two must be resident property owners in the district, one must be an architect with experience in preservation, and another must be a historian.

It reviews all exterior construction or renovation within the district requiring a building permit. It is also empowered to carry out surveys of the district and recommend new properties for designation as a local landmark.

== See also ==
- National Register of Historic Places listings in Washington County, New York
