= Dresden, Washington County, New York =

Dresden
- Town
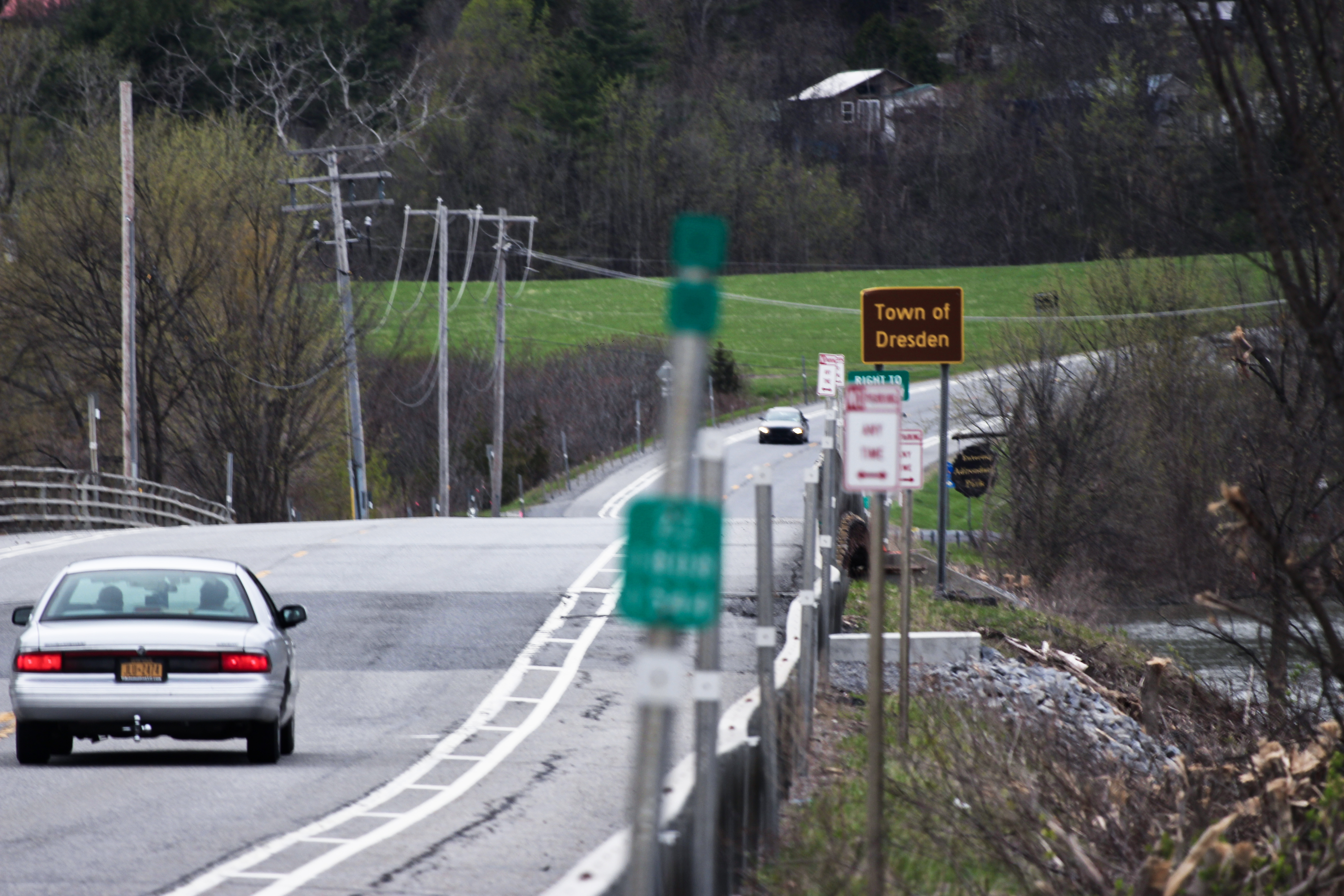
- Dresden, New York

- Location in Washington County and the state of New York.
- Coordinates: 43°40′21″N 73°24′38″W
- Country: United States
- State: New York
- County: Washington
- Incorporated: 1806

Population (2000)
  - Total: 677
  - Density: 33/sq mi (12.7/km^{2})
- Time zone: UTC-5 (Eastern (EST))
  - Summer (DST): UTC-4 (EDT)
- ZIP code(s): 12819 (primary): 12819 Clemons; 12887 Whitehall
- Area code: 518
- Website: http://townofdresdenny.com/

Dresden is a town in northern Washington County, New York, United States. It is part of the Glens Falls Metropolitan Statistical Area. The town population was 677 at the 2000 census.

== History ==
During the late colonial period, the town was on the Great War Path connecting French and British colonies, but few battles were fought in the town.

The town of Dresden was formed from the town of Fort Ann on March 15, 1822, as "South Bay" and was renamed "Dresden" on April 17.

The town was first settled in 1784. The early industries included lumbering and maple syrup preparation.

The completion of the Champlain Canal in 1823 aided the economic development of the area.

== Geography ==
The western town line is defined by Lake George with Warren County, New York beginning at the eastern shoreline. The eastern town boundary is defined by Lake Champlain, with Vermont and the town of Whitehall on the opposite shore. Fort Ann shares the southern border near the south basin of Lake Champlain, named South Bay. The northern border is shared by the town of Putnam. The town is wholly inside the Adirondack Park.

According to the United States Census Bureau, the town has a total area of 55.0 square miles (142 km^{2}), of which 53.4 square miles (138 km^{2}) is land and 1.6 square miles (4.1 km^{2}) (2.98%) is water.

The Champlain Canal and NY Route 22 are on the eastern side of the town.

== Demographics ==
Historical population
| Census | Pop. | Note | %± |
|---|---|---|---|
| 1830 | 475 | | — |
| 1840 | 679 | | 42.9% |
| 1850 | 674 | | −0.7% |
| 1860 | 779 | | 15.6% |
| 1870 | 684 | | −12.2% |
| 1880 | 730 | | 6.7% |
| 1890 | 636 | | −12.9% |
| 1900 | 545 | | −14.3% |
| 1910 | 582 | | 6.8% |
| 1920 | 495 | | −14.9% |
| 1930 | 470 | | −5.1% |
| 1940 | 508 | | 8.1% |
| 1950 | 433 | | −14.8% |
| 1960 | 426 | | −1.6% |
| 1970 | 480 | | 12.7% |
| 1980 | 559 | | 16.5% |
| 1990 | 561 | | 0.4% |
| 2000 | 677 | | 20.7% |
| 2010 | 652 | | −3.7% |
| 2014 (est.) | 645 | | −1.1% |
U.S. Decennial Census

As of the census of 2000, there were 677 people, 274 households, and 203 families residing in the town. The population density was 12.7 people per square mile (4.9 people/km^{2}). There were 630 housing units at an average density of 11.8 units per square mile (4.6 units/km^{2}). The racial makeup of the town was 99.26% White, 0.15% African American, and 0.59% from two or more races. It is rumored descendants of the Blackfoot tribe still inhabit this area. Hispanic or Latino of any race were 0.30% of the population.

There were 274 households, out of which 29.9% had children under the age of 18 living with them, 59.5% were married couples living together, 10.2% had a female householder with no husband present, and 25.9% were non-families. 22.6% of all households were made up of individuals, and 8.4% had someone living alone who was 65 years of age or older. The average household size was 2.47 and the average family size was 2.85.

In the town, the population was spread out, with 24.8% under the age of 18, 5.3% from 18 to 24, 27.0% from 25 to 44, 27.9% from 45 to 64, and 14.9% who were 65 years of age or older. The median age was 41 years. For every 100 females, there were 102.7 males. For every 100 females age 18 and over, there were 98.1 males.

The median income for a household in the town was $29,868, and the median income for a family was $39,583. Males had a median income of $25,625 versus $17,500 for females. The per capita income for the town was $18,346. About 9.1% of families and 9.0% of the population were below the poverty line, including 6.5% of those under age 18 and 8.3% of those age 65 or over.

== Communities and locations in Dresden ==
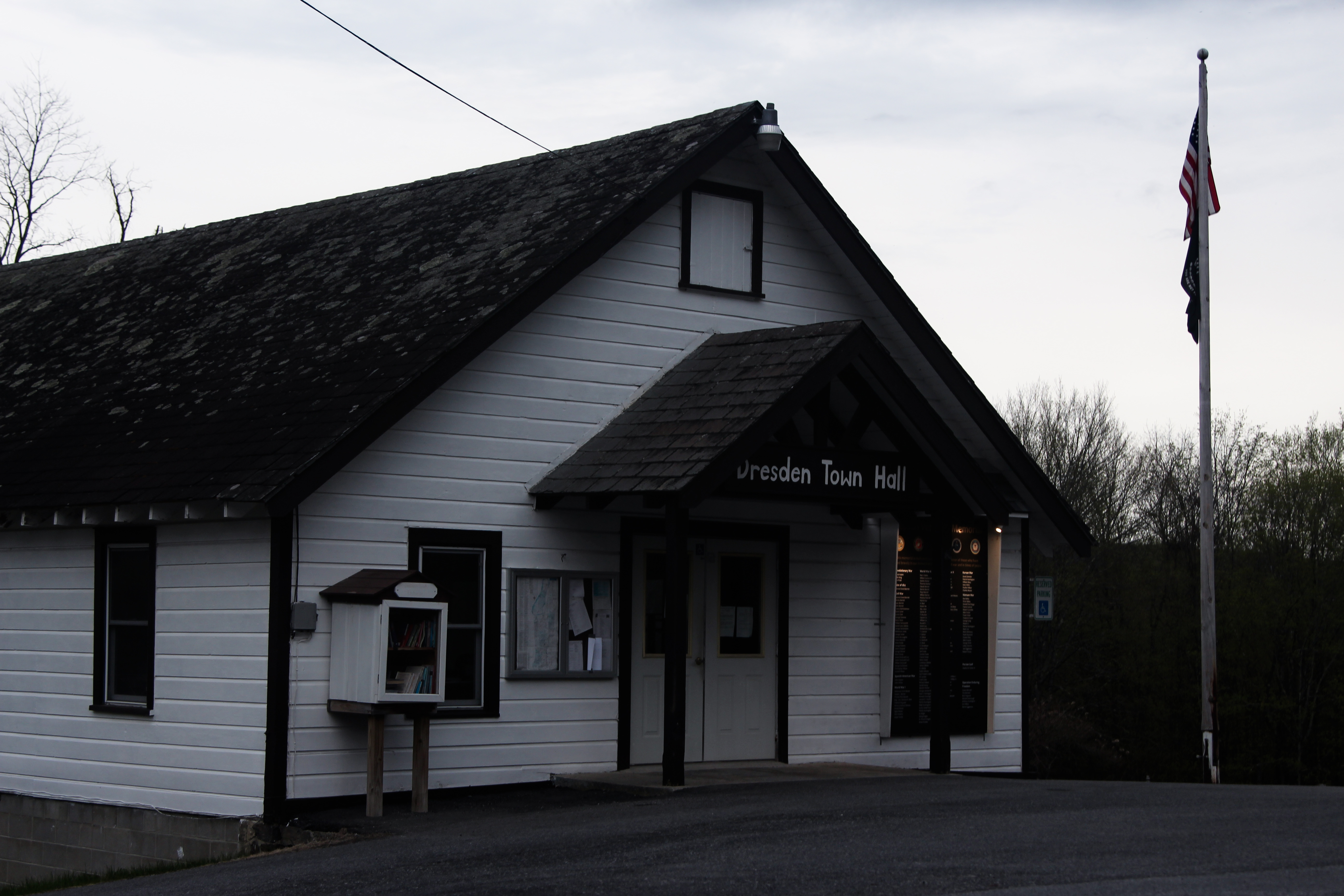
Dresden Town Hall

=== Communities ===
- Clemons – A hamlet near the eastern town line on Route 22, near the intersection of County Road 6. The L. C. Simonds Adirondack Cabin was added to the National Register of Historic Places in 2010.
- Dresden – A hamlet located in the northeastern section of the town on Route 22. Dresden is located on the western shore of the southern arm of Lake Champlain.
- Dresden Station – A hamlet on Route 22 and the Delaware and Hudson Railway in the northwestern part of town, along Lake Champlain.
- Huletts Landing – A hamlet on County Road 6, along Lake George in the western part of the town.

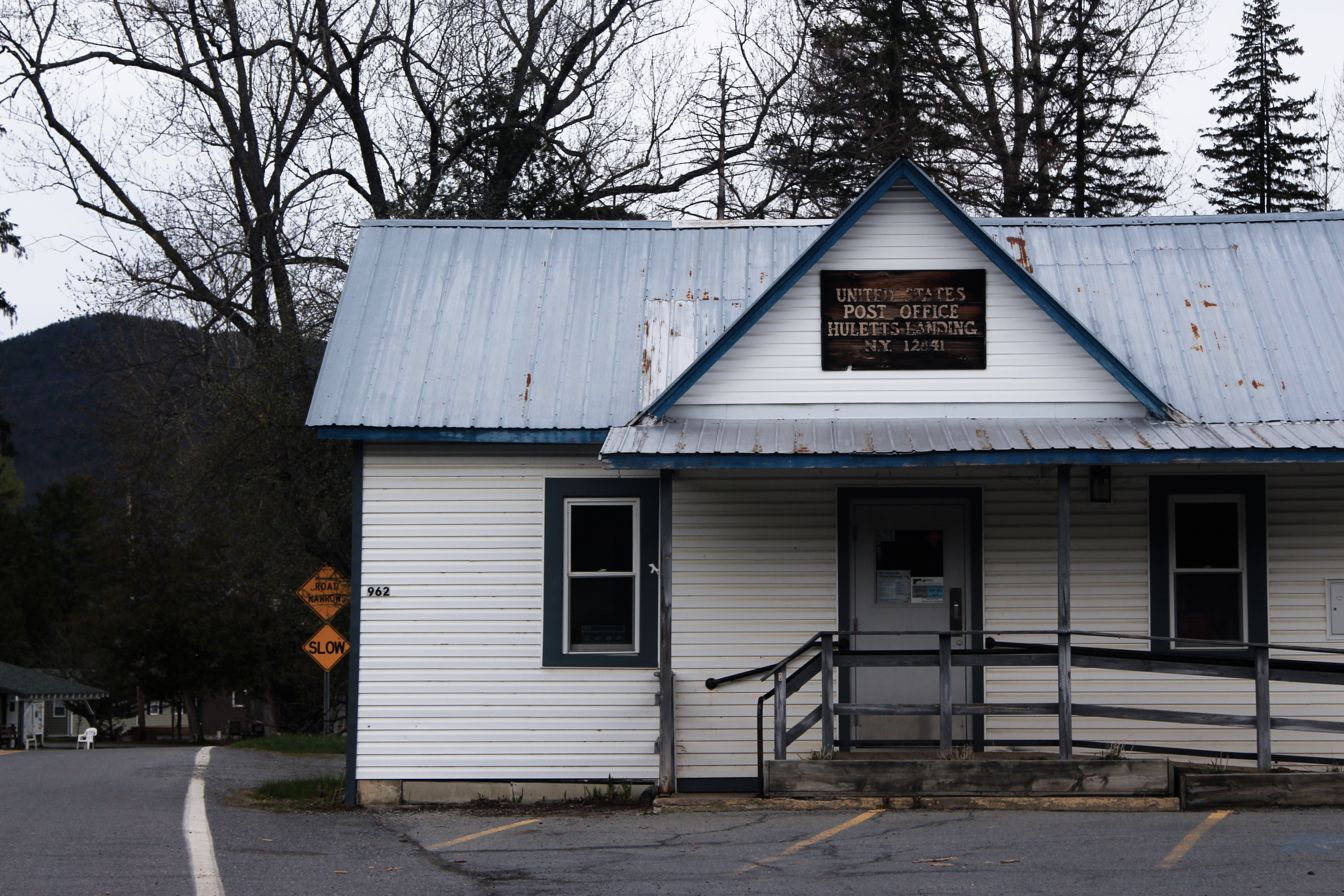
A post office on Washington County Route 6 in the hamlet of Huletts Landing, May 3, 2022.

=== Geographical features ===
- Bald Mountain – An elevation west of South Bay.
- Black Mountain – An elevation south of Huletts Landing.
- Bluff Head – A projection into Lake George, north of Huletts Landing.
- Bumps Pond – A small lake by the southern town line.
- Erebus Mountain – An elevation in the southwestern corner of Dresden.
- Fishbrook Pond – A small lake east of Erebus Mountain.
- Lapland Pond – A small lake south of Huletts Landing.
- Millman Pond – A small pond that drains into Lapland Pond.
- Pike Brook – A small stream connecting Lapland Pond to Lake Champlain.
- Pine Lake – A lake west on NY-22 in the southern part of Dresden, west of South Bay.
- Pine Lake Brook – A stream from Pine Lake to South Bay.
- Red Rock – A projection into Lake George at the southeastern corner of Dresden.
- South Bay – The southern end of Lake Champlain.
- Spectacle Pond – A small lake at the southern town line.
- Spruce Mountain – An elevation by the northern town line.
- Sugarloaf Mountain – An elevation southwest of Huletts Landing.
