= Greenwich (village), New York =

Greenwich
- Village
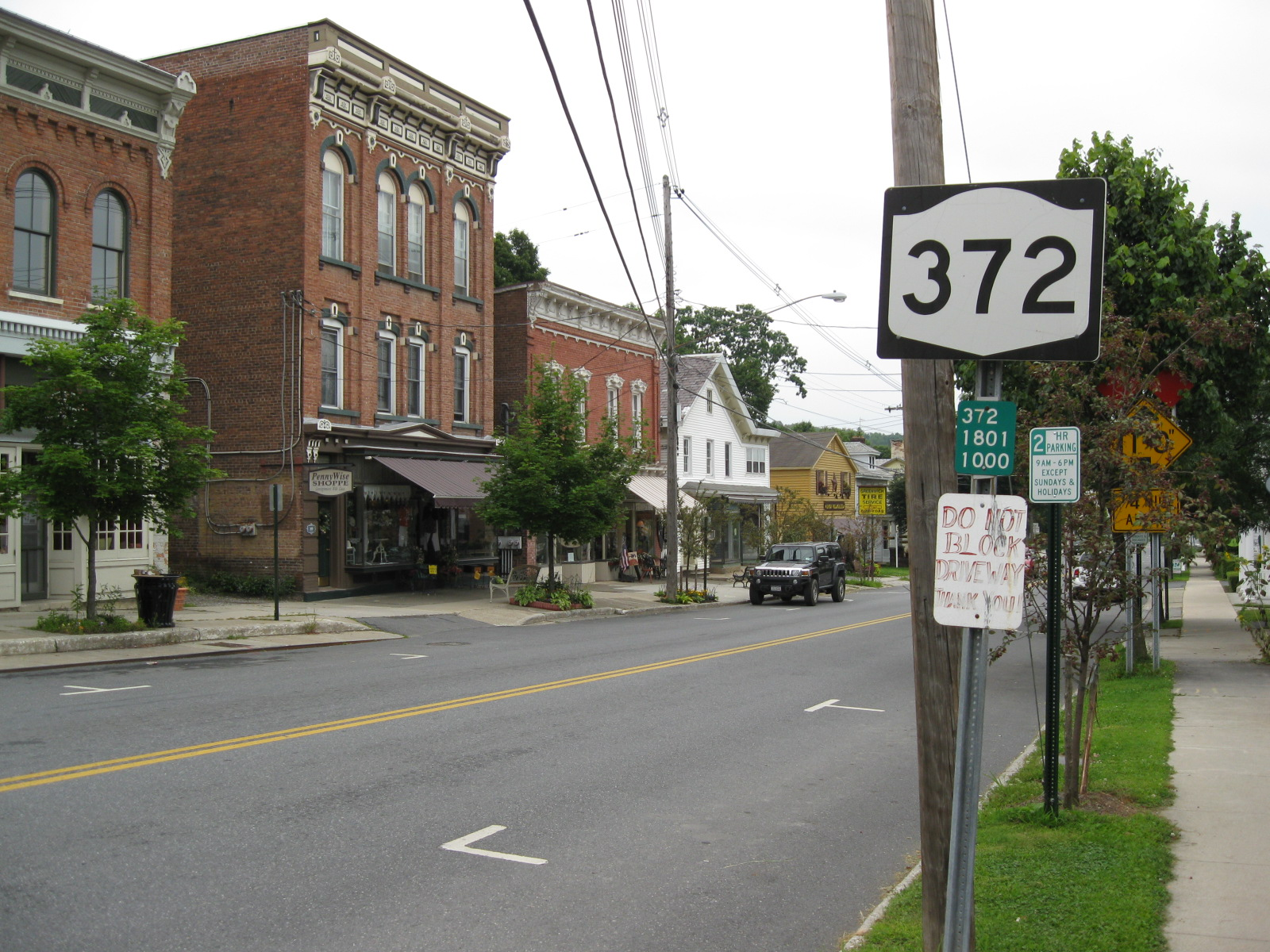

- Location in Washington County and the state of New York.
- Coordinates: 43°5′29″N 73°29′50″W
- Country: United States
- State: New York
- County: Washington

Government
  - Mayor: Amanda Hurley (Independent)

Area
  - Total: 1.47 sq mi (3.81 km^{2})
  - Land: 1.47 sq mi (3.81 km^{2})
  - Water: 0 sq mi (0.00 km^{2})
- Elevation: 374 ft (114 m)

Population (2020)
  - Total: 1,651
  - Density: 1,123.0/sq mi (433.59/km^{2})
- Time zone: UTC-5 (Eastern (EST))
  - Summer (DST): UTC-4 (EDT)
- ZIP code: 12834
- Area code: 518
- FIPS code: 36-30675
- GNIS feature ID: 0951780
- Website: villageofgreenwichny.gov

Formerly known as Whipple City, Greenwich (/ˈɡriːnwɪtʃ/) is a village in Washington County, New York, United States. It is part of the Glens Falls Metropolitan Statistical Area. The village population was 1,777 at the 2010 census.

The Village of Greenwich is located at the southern town line of the Town of Greenwich; a small part of the village is in the Town of Easton. The village developed on both sides of the Battenkill River and is served by Route NY-29.

== History ==
This area was settled by European Americans after the American Revolutionary War, as migrants moved into New York from New England. The community was originally named Whipple City after Job Whipple, the owner of a successful cotton mill (1804). In 1809, the community set itself off from the town by incorporating as Union Village. Cotton and textile manufacturing, based on cotton from the Deep South, continued to be a profitable industry in the village for some time through the 19th century. It connected the villagers to the economy of King Cotton. In 1867, the village changed its name to Greenwich.

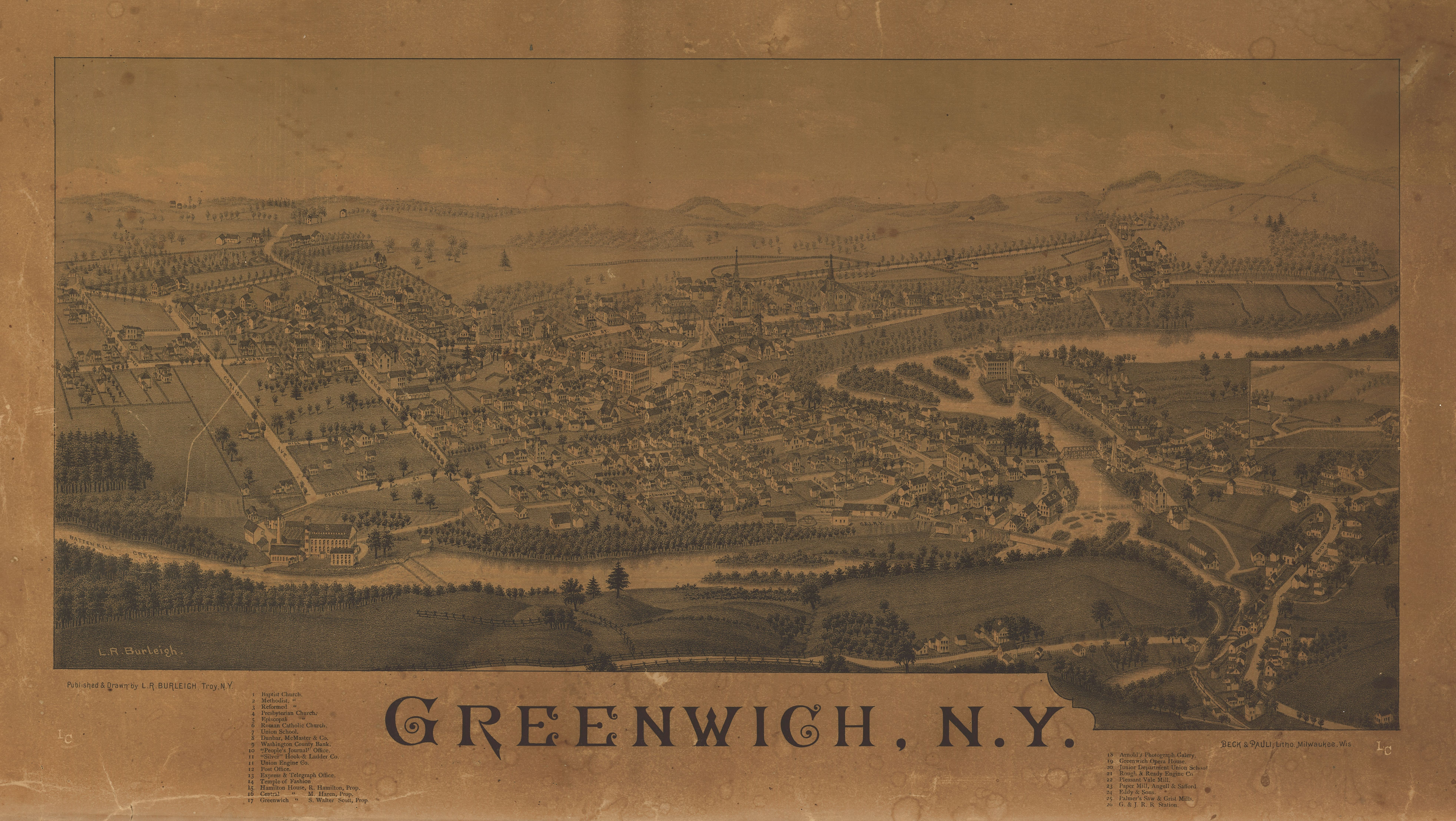
Perspective map of Greenwich with list of landmarks from 1885 by L.R. Burleigh

An important station of the Underground Railroad was located in Greenwich, and local people helped fugitive slaves reach freedom in upstate New York or Canada. A historical marker, containing a map showing locations of safe houses and commemorating Greenwich's contribution to the Underground Railroad, was dedicated in 2004.

United States President Chester A. Arthur attended prep school in Greenwich while his father served here as pastor at Bottskill Baptist Church.

The Village of Greenwich Historic District was listed on the National Register of Historic Places in 1995.

== Geography ==
According to the United States Census Bureau, the village has a total area of 1.485 square miles (3.85 km^{2}), all land.

The Batten Kill, a river in the southern part of the town, has historically provided power. It has attracted many settlements, besides Greenwich village, along its course.

New York Route 29 passes through the village from east to west. The northern terminus of New York Route 372 is in the village, where it joins NY-29.

== Demographics ==
The village attained its peak of population in the 1920 census. A decline in manufacturing in the area led to a loss of jobs; in addition, urbanization attracted people to larger cities.

Historical population
Census	Pop.	Note	%±
1880	1,231		—
1890	1,663		35.1%
1900	1,869		12.4%
1910	2,314		23.8%
1920	2,384		3.0%
1930	2,290		−3.9%
1940	2,270		−0.9%
1950	2,212		−2.6%
1960	2,263		2.3%
1970	2,092		−7.6%
1980	1,955		−6.5%
1990	1,961		0.3%
2000	1,902		−3.0%
2010	1,777		−6.6%
2020	1,651		−7.1%
U.S. Decennial Census

As of the census of 2000, there were 1,902 people, 788 households, and 493 families residing in the village. The population density was 1,280.4 inhabitants per square mile (494.4/km^{2}). There were 852 housing units at an average density of 573.6 per square mile (221.5/km^{2}). The racial makeup of the village was 98.11% White, 0.32% Black or African American, 0.05% Native American, 0.63% Asian, 0.11% from other races, and 0.79% from two or more races. 0.74% of the population were Hispanic or Latino of any race.

There were 788 households, out of which 33.9% had children under the age of 18 living with them, 46.1% were married couples living together, 11.5% had a female householder with no husband present, and 37.4% were non-families. 31.5% of all households were made up of individuals, and 15.2% had someone living alone who was 65 years of age or older. The average household size was 2.41 and the average family size was 3.06.

In the village, the population was spread out, with 27.2% under the age of 18, 7.6% from 18 to 24, 28.8% from 25 to 44, 21.5% from 45 to 64, and 14.9% who were 65 years of age or older. The median age was 37 years. For every 100 females, there were 97.1 males. For every 100 females age 18 and over, there were 88.3 males.

The median income for a household in the village was $34,659, and the median income for a family was $42,198. Males had a median income of $31,951 versus $20,795 for females. The per capita income for the village was $16,592. 8.3% of the population and 4.8% of families were below the poverty line. Out of the total population, 7.7% of those under the age of 18 and 9.6% of those 65 and older were living below the poverty line.
