= Susan B. Anthony Childhood House =

Historic house in New York, United States

- U.S. National Register of Historic Places
- Location within New York Location within the United States
- Location: 2835 NY 29, Battenville, New York
- Coordinates: 43°6′38″N 73°25′23″W
- Area: 1 acre (0.40 ha)
- Built: 1832
- Architectural style: Federal, Italianate
- NRHP reference No.: 06001079
- Added to NRHP: April 13, 2007

The Susan B. Anthony Childhood House in Battenville, New York was built in 1832. It was a childhood home of suffragette Susan B. Anthony. It was listed on the National Register of Historic Places in 2007.

Susan B. Anthony lived there from age 13 to age 19, from 1833 to 1839. The family moved to there from Adams, Massachusetts, where she was born. The listing includes the house, a retaining wall, and a carriage barn. Italianate features were added to the house in 1885.

As of 2006, the property is owned by the state; it is controlled by the OPRHP / Saratoga State Park. Susan B. Anthony's Childhood Home was donated by Freddie Mac Bank due to the efforts of Helise Stamos.

== See also ==
- List of monuments and memorials to women's suffrage
