= United States Post Office (Whitehall, New York) =

- US Post Office-Whitehall
- U.S. National Register of Historic Places
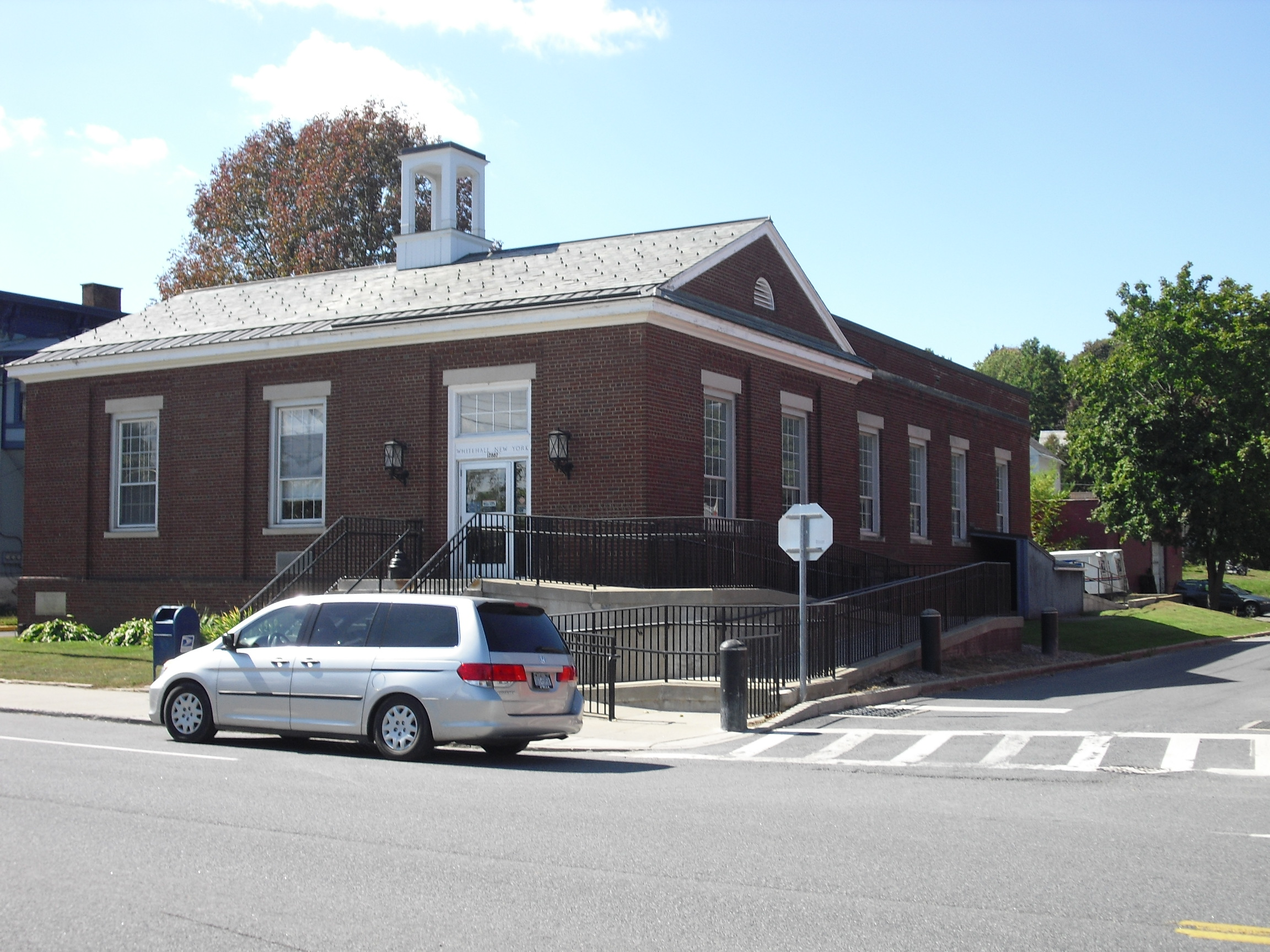

- Location within New York Location within the United States
- Location: 88 Broadway, Whitehall, New York
- Coordinates: 43°33′12″N 73°24′16″W
- Area: less than one acre
- Built: 1937
- Architect: Simon, Louis A.; Horn, Axel
- Architectural style: Colonial Revival
- MPS: US Post Offices in New York State, 1858-1943, TR
- NRHP reference No.: 88002447
- Added to NRHP: May 11, 1989

US Post Office-Whitehall is a historic post office building located at Whitehall in Washington County, New York. It was designed and built 1937–1938, and is one of a number of post offices in New York State designed by the Office of the Supervising Architect of the Treasury Department under Louis A. Simon. The building is in the Colonial Revival style and is a modest one story building, three bays wide and clad in red brick. The interior features a 1939 mural by Axel Horn titled "Settlement of Skenesborough."

It was listed on the National Register of Historic Places in 1989.

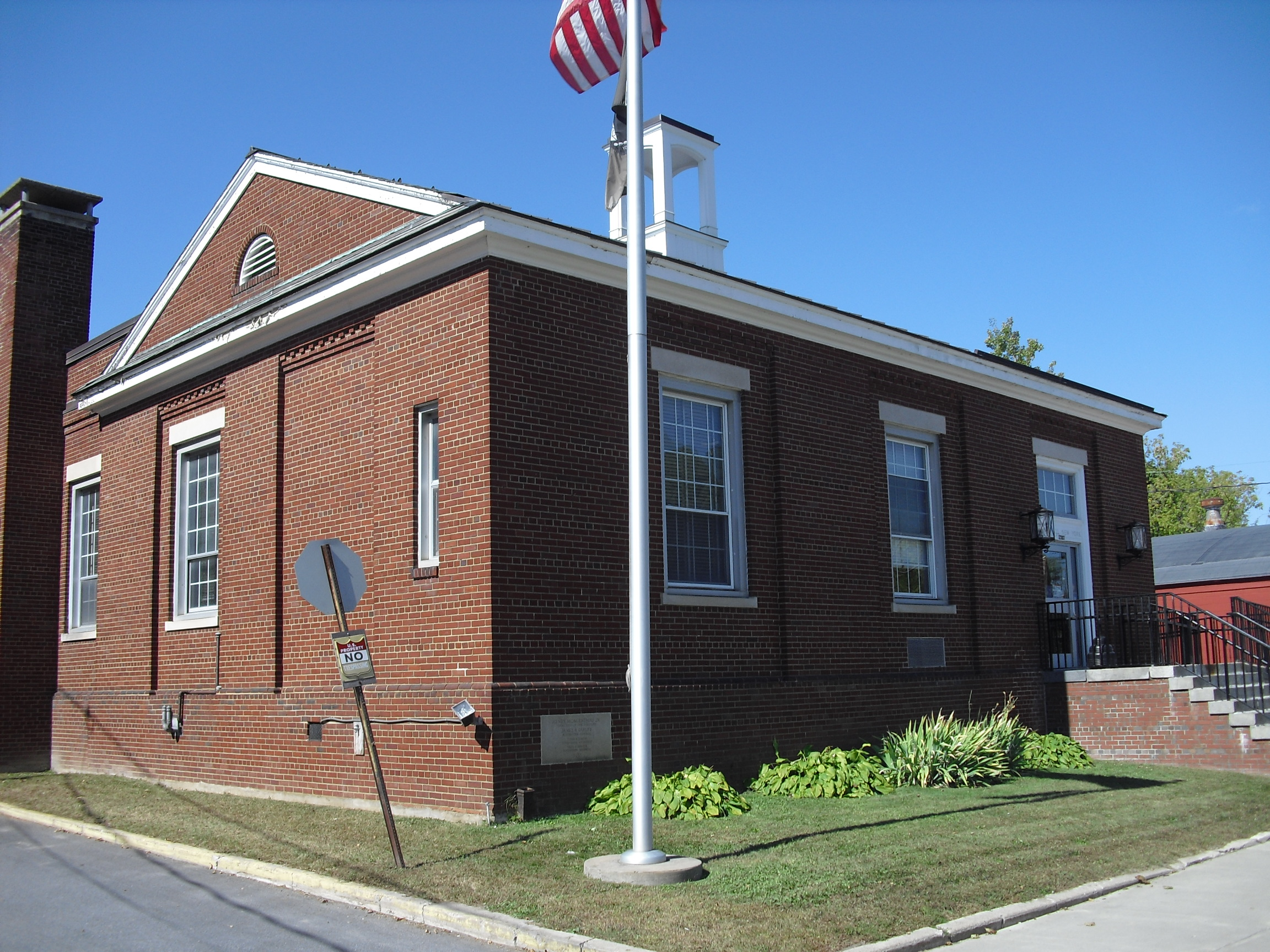
Corner view of the post office
