= United States Post Office (Hudson Falls, New York) =

- US Post Office-Hudson Falls
- U.S. National Register of Historic Places
- U.S. Historic district – Contributing property
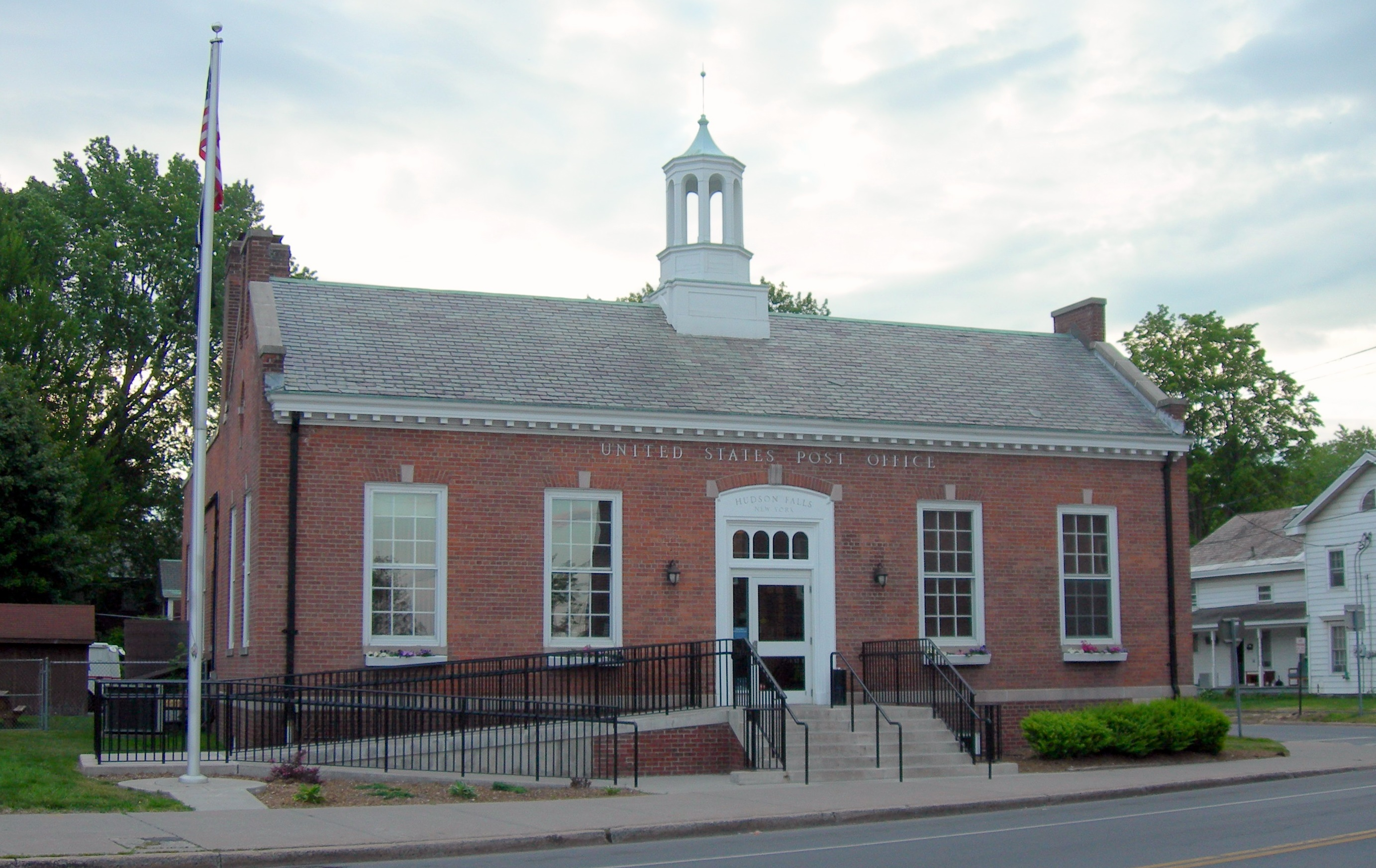
- U.S. Post Office, Hudson Falls NY, June 2008

- Location within New York Location within the United States
- Interactive map of US Post Office-Hudson Falls
- Location: 114 Main St., Hudson Falls, New York
- Coordinates: 43°17′59″N 73°35′8″W
- Area: less than one acre
- Built: 1935; 91 years ago
- Architect: Simon, Louis A.; Picken, George
- Architectural style: Colonial Revival
- MPS: US Post Offices in New York State, 1858-1943, TR
- NRHP reference No.: 88002509
- Added to NRHP: May 11, 1989

US Post Office-Hudson Falls is a historic post office building located at Hudson Falls in Washington County, New York. It was designed and built 1935–1936, and is one of a number of post offices in New York State designed by the Office of the Supervising Architect of the Treasury Department under Louis A. Simon. The building is in the Colonial Revival style and is a 1 1/2-story, five-bay, steel-frame building clad in red brick. The interior features a 1937 mural series by George Picken that includes "Scenes and Activities of the Hudson," "Transportation," and "Mail by Airplane."

It was listed on the National Register of Historic Places in 1989.
