= List of suppressed parishes in the Roman Catholic Diocese of Albany =

This is a list of closed and open churches within the Roman Catholic Diocese of Albany. In 2006, the Diocese started the "Called to BE Church" initiative. As of November 2015, this initiative had reduced the number of parishes to 126 through church mergers and closings in response to declining church enrollment, priest shortages, and changing demographics.

Year	Parish	City/town	Notes	Ref
1916	St. Augustine's Mission Church	White Creek		
1927	Expectation of the Blessed Virgin Mary Mission Church	Crescent		
1930	St. John the Baptist Mission Church	Central Bridge		
1931	Holy Cross Mission Church	Gallatin		
1934	St. Jariath's Mission Church	Hampton		
1935	St. Bridget's Mission Church	Oppenheim		
1936	Our Lady of Mount Carmel Mission Church	Mariaville		
1943	St. Patrick's Mission Church	Waterford		
1946	St. Joseph's Mission Church	Bleecker		
1947	St. Mary of the Mountain Mission Church	East Poestenkill		
1955	St. Francis de Sales Mission Church	Hancock		
1955	St. Leo's Mission Church	Lordville		
1955	St. George's Mission Church	Oak Hill		
1955	Our Lady of Lourdes Mission Church	Fishs Eddy		
1956	Sacred Heart Church	Arkville		
1958	St. Mark's Chapel	Snyder's Lake		
1960	St. Theresa's Mission Church	Athens		
1963	Assumption of the Blessed Virgin Mary Parish (French)	Albany	Building demolished to make way for the Empire State Plaza; parish title transferred to the current location in Latham (Our Lady of the Assumption)	
1965	St. Patrick's Mission Church	North Granville		
1970	St. Jean Baptiste Church	Troy		
1972	St. Anthony's Church	Albany	Building now the site of a community arts center	
1974	Sacred Heart Church (French)	Schenectady	Merged with St. Columba's Parish to form Sacred Heart-St. Columba's Church	
1974	St. Columba's Church (Irish)	Schenectady	Merged with Sacred Heart Parish to form Sacred Heart-St. Columba's Church; now site of the Higher Ground Worship Center	
1974	St. Bridget's Mission Church	Salisbury		
1974	St. Phillip the Apostle Mission Church	Albany		
1974	St. Anthony's Mission Church	Howes Cave		
1974	Our Lady of the Lake Mission Church	Kinderhook		
1974	Holy Cross Mission Church	Jefferson		
1974	St. Leo's Mission Church	Dunsbach Ferry		
1975	St. Agnes Church	Cohoes	Merged with St. Patrick's Church to form St. Agnes/St. Patrick's Church	
1975	St. Patrick's Church	Cohoes	Merged with St. Agnes Church to form St. Agnes/St. Patrick's Church	
1975	St. Rita's Church	Cohoes	Merged with Sacred Heart Church to form St. Rita/Sacred Heart Church	
1975	Sacred Heart Church	Cohoes	Merged with St. Agnes Church to form St. Rita/Sacred Heart Church	
1977	Church of the Assumption	Mechanicville	Merged with St. Paul the Apostle Parish to form Assumption/St. Paul Church	
1977	St. Paul the Apostle Church	Mechanicville	Merged with Church of the Assumption to form Assumption/St. Paul Church	
1978	St. Ann's Church	Albany	Merged with St. John's Church; both merged again with St. James Parish to form the St. Francis of Assisi Parish in 2010	
1978	St. John's Church	Albany	Merged with St. Ann's Church; both merged again with St. James Parish to form the St. Francis of Assisi Parish in 2010	
1978	St. Charles Borromeo Mission Church	Wevertown		
1978	St. Anndrew's Mission Church	Berne		
1979	St. Mary of the Lake Mission Church	Berne		
1979	St. Joseph's Parish	Amsterdam	Merged with St. Michael the Archangel and Our Lady of Mount Carmel Parishes to form St. Joseph's, St. Michael the Archangel, Our Lady of Mount Carmel Church	
1979	St. Michael the Archangel Parish	Amsterdam	Merged with St. Joseph's and Our Lady of Mount Carmel Parishes to form St. Joseph's, St. Michael the Archangel, Our Lady of Mount Carmel Church; building now a site of worship for the Latin American Pentecostal Church of God	
1979	Our Lady of Mount Carmel Church	Amsterdam	Merged with St. Michael the Archangel and St. Joseph's Church to form St. Joseph's, St. Michael the Archangel, Our Lady of Mount Carmel Church	
1982	Assumption of the Blessed Virgin Mary Mission Church	Greenville		
1984	St. Mary of the Lake Mission Church	Mariaville		
1985	St. Mary's Church	Stuyvesant Falls	Merged with Nativity of the Blessed Virgin Mary (Stuyvesant) to form Nativity/St. Mary's Church	
1985	Nativity of the Blessed Virgin Mary	Stuyvesant	Merged with St. Mary's Church (Stuyvesant Falls) to form Nativity/St. Mary's Church	
1987	SS. Cyril & Methodius Church	Schenectady	Now site of the Bible Church of Christ	
1987	Notre Dame des Lourdes Church (French)	Schuylerville	Merged with Our Lady of the Visitation Church to form Notre Dame-Visitation Church	
1987	Our Lady of the Visitation Church	Schuylerville	Merged with Notre Dame des Lourdes Church (French) to form Notre Dame-Visitation Church	
1987	St. Lawrence's Church	Troy		
1990	St. Mary's Church	Gloversville	Merged with Our Lady of Mt. Carmel Parish to form St. Mary of Mt. Carmel Parish	
1990	Our Lady of Mount Carmel Church	Gloversville	Merged with St. Mary's Church to form St. Mary of Mt. Carmel Parish	
1990	St. Francis de Sales Church	Gloversville		
1990	Our Lady of Mount Carmel Church	Hudson		
1990	Sacred Heart/Our Lady of Perpetual Help Church	Hudson		
1992	Immaculate Heart of Mary Church	Hudson Falls	Merged with St. Paul's Church to form St. Mary's/St. Paul's Church	
1992	St. Paul's Church	Hudson Falls	Merged with Immaculate Heart of Mary Church to form St. Mary's/St. Paul's Church	
1992	St. Joseph's Church	Little Falls	Merged with St. Mary's and Sacred Heart Parishes to form Holy Family Parish	
1992	St. Mary's Church	Little Falls	Merged with St. Joseph's and Sacred Heart Parishes to form Holy Family Parish	
1992	Sacred Heart Church	Little Falls	Merged with St. Mary's and St. Joseph's Parishes to form Holy Family Parish	
1993	St. Joseph's Church	Malden Bridge		
1993	St. Anthony's Church	Herkimer	Merged with St. Joseph's Church to form Ss. Anthony & Joseph Church	
1993	St. Joseph's Church	Herkimer	Merged with St. Anthony's Church to form Ss. Anthony & Joseph Church	
1994	St. Joseph's Church	Albany	Merged with Sacred Heart of Jesus Parish and absorbed the Vietnamese Apostolate; building still standing as of 2021	
1994	All Saints Church	Granville		
1995	St. Bridget's Mission Church	Buskirk		
1995	St. Mary's Church	Frankfort	Merged with Ss. Peter & Paul Church to form Our Lady Queen of Apostles Church	
1995	Ss. Peter & Paul Church	Frankfort	Merged with St. Mary's Church to form Our Lady Queen of Apostles Church	
1995	St. Mary of the Mountain Church	Hunter	Ownership transferred to the town; building razed on April 12, 2017.	
1995	St. Theresa's Mission Church	Frankfort		
1995	St. Mary's Parish	Smith's Landing (Cementon)		
1996	St. Pius X Mission Church	Pottersville		
1997	St. Edmund's Mission Church	Acra		
1998	St. Agnes/St. Patrick's Church	Cohoes	Merged with St. Marie's Church to form Holy Trinity Church	
1998	St. Marie's Church	Cohoes	Merged with St. Agnes/St. Patrick's Church to form Holy Trinity Church	
1998	St. Cecilia Mission Church	Lexington		
1999	St. Thomas the Apostle Parish	Schenectady	Now the site of the Schenectady Hindu Temple	
1999	St. Theresa the Little Flower Mission Church	Davenport Center		
2000	St. Francis de Sales Church	Elka Park		
2000	Our Lady of Angels Church	Whitehall	Merged with Notre Dame des Victoires (French) to form Our Lady of Hope	
2000	Notre Dame des Victoires (French)	Whitehall	Merged with Our Our Lady of Angels Church to form Our Lady of Hope	
2000	Church of the Assumption of the Blessed Virgin Mary	Schodack Landing		
2001	St. Monica's Parish	Johnsonville	Merged with Our Lady of Good Council Parish of Valley Falls and St. John the Baptist Parish of Schaghticoke to form the Church of the Holy Trinity; the latter merged with St. Bonaventure Parish of Speigeltown to form the Transfiguration Parish in 2010	
2001	Our Lady of Good Counsel Parish	Valley Falls	Merged with St. Monica's Parish of Johnsonville and St. John the Baptist Parish of Schaghticoke to form the Church of the Holy Trinity; the latter merged with St. Bonaventure Parish of Speigeltown to form the Transfiguration Parish in 2010	
2001	St. John the Baptist Parish	Schaghticoke	Merged with St. Monica's Parish of Johnsonville and Our Lady of Good Counsel of Valley Falls to form the Church of the Holy Trinity; the latter merged with St. Bonaventure Parish of Speigeltown to form the Transfiguration Parish in 2010	
2001	Most Precious Blood of Jesus Church	South Kortright		
2001	St. Barbara's Chapel	Caroga Lake		
2002	Our Lady Help of Christians Church	Albany	Now site of St. Peter's Health Partners addiction recovery clinic	
2003	Immaculate Conception Church	Johnstown	Merged with St. Anthony's Church and St. Patrick's Church to form Holy Trinity Church	
2003	St. Anthony's Church	Johnstown	Merged with Immaculate Conception Church and St. Patrick's Church to form Holy Trinity Church	
2003	St. Patrick's Church	Johnstown	Merged with St. Anthony's Church and Immaculate Conception Church to form Holy Trinity Church	
2003	Holy Trinity Church	Troy		
2003	St. Anne's Church	Waterford		
2003	St. Paul's Mission Church	Franklin, Delaware County		
2003	St. Ambrose Mission Church	Unadilla (village), Delaware County		
2004	St. Phillip's Mission Church	Hartford		
2005	Our Lady of Angels Church	Albany	Merged with St. Patrick's Church (Irish) and St. Casimir's Church (Polish) to form Holy Family Parish	
2005	St. Casmir's Church (Polish)	Albany	Merged with St. Patrick's Church (Irish) and Our Lady of Angels Church to form Holy Family Parish	
2005	St. Patrick's Church (Irish)	Albany	Merged with St. Casimir's Church (Polish) and Our Lady of Angels Church to form Holy Family Parish	
2005	St. George's Church	Albany		
2005	Holy Cross Parish	Taghkanic	Merged with Sacred Heart Parish of Philmont to form the St. John Vianney Parish	
2005	Sacred Heart Parish	Philmont	Merged with Holy Cross Parish of Taghkanic to form the St. John Vianney Parish	
2005	Sacred Heart of Mary Church	Watervliet		
2005	St. Brigid's Parish	Watervliet	Merged with Immaculate Conception, Our Lady of Mt. Carmel, Sacred Heart of Mary Parishes (all of Watervliet) and St. Joseph's Church of Green Island to form Immaculate Heart of Mary Parish	
2005	Church of the Immaculate Conception	Watervliet	Merged with St. Brigid's, Our Lady of Mt. Carmel, Sacred Heart of Mary Parishes (all of Watervliet) and St. Joseph's Church of Green Island to form Immaculate Heart of Mary Parish	
2005	Our Lady of Mount Carmel Church	Watervliet	Merged with Immaculate Conception, St. Brigid's, Sacred Heart of Mary Parishes (all of Watervliet) and St. Joseph's Church of Green Island to form Immaculate Heart of Mary Parish	
2005	St. Patrick's Church	Watervliet	Merged with Immaculate Conception, Our Lady of Mt. Carmel, Sacred Heart of Mary Parishes (all of Watervliet) and St. Joseph's Church of Green Island to form Immaculate Heart of Mary Parish	
2005	St. Joseph's Church	Green Island	Merged with Immaculate Conception, Our Lady of Mt. Carmel, Sacred Heart of Mary Parishes (all of Watervliet) to form Immaculate Heart of Mary Parish	
2006	St. John The Evangelist Church	Rensselaer	Merged with St. Joseph's Church to form St. John the Evangelist and St. Joseph's Church	
2006	St. Joseph's Church	Rensselaer	Merged with St. John the Evangelist Church to form St. John the Evangelist and St. Joseph's Church	
2006	Holy Cross Parish (Lithuanian)	Schenectady	Building now site of a stained glass studio	
2007	St. Bridget's Mission Church	Leeds		
2008	St. Theresa's Church	Brant Lake		
2008	St. Mark's Church	Eagle Mills		
2008	St. Mary of the Assumption Church	Middleville		
2008	Sacred Heart-St. Columba's Church	Schenectady		
2009	Holy Cross Church (German)	Albany	Merged with St. Margaret Mary Parish to form All Saints Catholic Church; original site demolished to make room for the Empire State Plaza	
2009	St. Margaret Mary Church	Albany	Merged with Holy Cross Church to form All Saints Catholic Church	
2009	St. Catherine of Siena Church	Albany	Merged with St. Teresa of Avila Church to form the Parish of Mater Cristi	
2009	St. Theresa of Avila Church	Albany	Merged with St. Catherine of Siena Church to form the Parish of Mater Cristi	
2009	Church of the Resurrection Parish	Germantown	Merged with the Church of St. Mary in Hudson to form Holy Trinity Parish	
2009	Holy Family Parish	Stottville	Merged with Nativity/St. Mary's Parish of Stuyvesant Falls to form the Church of St. Joseph	
2009	St. Francis de Sales Parish	Loudonville	Merged with Our Lady of Mercy in the Town of Colonie to form Christ, Our Light Parish	
2009	Our Lady of Mercy Parish	Colonie	Merged with St. Frances de Sales Parish in Loudonville to form Christ, Our Light Parish; building now the site of the Macedonia Baptist Church	
2009	St. Bridget's Parish	Copake Falls	Merged with St. John Vianney Church of Claverack to form the Our Lady of Hope Parish	
2009	St. John Vianney Church	Claverack	Merged with St. Bridget's Church of Copake Falls to form the Our Lady of Hope Parish	
2009	Blessed Sacrament Church	Springfield Center	Merged with St. Thomas the Apostle Parish in Cherry Valley	
2009	St. Mary's Church	Sharon Springs	Merged with St. Thomas the Apostle Parish in Cherry Valley	
2009	St. Joseph's Parish	West Winfield	Merged with St. Joseph Parish (Richfield Springs) to form St. Joseph the Worker Parish	
2009	St. Joseph Parish	Richfield Springs	Merged with St. Joseph Parish (West Winfield) to form St. Joseph the Worker Parish	
2009	St. Casimir's Parish (Lithuanian)	Amsterdam	Building now the site of the Five Buddhists Temple	
2009	St. John the Baptist Parish	Amsterdam	Building now a site of worship for the Latin American Pentecostal Church of God	
2009	Church of the Sacred Heart	Palenville	Merged with Immaculate Conception (Haines Falls) to form Sacred Heart-Immaculate Conception Church	
2009	St. Bernard's Parish	Cohoes		
2009	St. Joseph's Church	Cohoes		
2009	St. Rita/Sacred Heart Church	Cohoes		
2009	St. Joseph's Church	Cohoes	Building now the site of The Venue	
2009	St. Francis de Sales Parish	Troy	Building now a Phi Sigma Kappa fraternity house	
2009	Church of St. Paul the Apostle	Troy	Building later sold to Unity House	
2009	St. Peter's Church	Troy		
2009	St. William's Church	Troy		
2009	Sacred Heart Church	Berlin	Merged with St. John Francis Regis Church (Grafton) to form the Parish of Our Lady of the Snow	
2009	St. John Francis Regis Church	Grafton	Merged with Sacred Heart Church (Berlin) to form the Parish of Our Lady of the Snow	
2009	St. George's Church	Pittstown		
2009	St. John the Baptist Church	Schenectady	Building now Seed of Abraham synagogue	
2009	St. Mary's Church (Polish)	Schenectady	Building now Renaissance Restaurant and Banquet Hall	
2009	St. Catherine's Church	Middleburgh	Merged with St. Joseph's Church (Schoharie) to form Our Lady of the Valley Parish	
2009	St. Joseph's Church	Schoharie	Merged with St. Catherine's Church (Middleburgh) to form Our Lady of the Valley Parish	
2009	St. John the Baptist Church	Chestertown	Merged with Blessed Sacrament Church (Hague) to become St. Isaac Jogues Parish	
2009	Blessed Sacrament Church	Hague	Merged with St. John the Baptist Church (Chestertown) to become St. Isaac Jogues Parish	
2009	Immaculate Conception Church	Corinth	Merged with Holy Infancy Church (Lake Luzerne) to form Holy Mother and Child Parish	
2009	Holy Infancy Church	Lake Luzerne	Merged with Immaculate Conception Church (Corinth) to form Holy Mother and Child Parish	
2009	Our Lady of Mount Carmel Church	Middle Granville		
2009	Immaculate Conception Church	Haines Falls	Merged with Sacred Heart Church (Palenville) to form Sacred Heart-Immaculate Conception Church	
2009	St. Mary's Church	Hudson	Merged with Church of the ResurrectionGermantown to form Holy Trinity Parish	
2009	Nativity/St. Mary's Church	Stuyvesant Falls	Merged with Nativity/St. Mary's Parish of Stottville to form the Church of St. Joseph	
2009	Nativity of the Blessed Virgin Mary Church	Edmeston		
2009	St. Mary's Church	Schenevus		
2009	St. Anna's Church	Summit		
2009	Our Lady of Good Counsel Church	Roxbury		
2009	SS. Peter and Paul Parish	Canajoharie	Merged with St. Patrick's Parish (St. Johnsville) and St. James' Parish (Fort Plain) to form the Parish of Our Lady of Hope at the latter site	
2009	St. James Church	Fort Plain	Merged with Ss. Peter & Paul Church (Canajoharie) and St. Patrick's Church (St. Johnsville) to form Our Lady of Hope Parish	
2009	St. Patrick's Church	St. Johnsville	Merged with Ss. Peter & Paul Church (Canajoharie) and St. James Church (Fort Plain) to form Our Lady of Hope Parish	
2009	St. Mary of Mount Carmel Church	Gloversville	Merged with Sacred Heart Church to form Church of the Holy Spirit	
2009	Sacred Heart Church	Gloversville	Merged with St. Mary of Mount Carmel Church to form Church of the Holy Spirit	
2009	Our Lady of the Assumption Mission Church	Cleverdale		
2010	Church of St. Alphonsus	Glens Falls	Building now the site of Just Water	
2010	Immaculate Conception Church	Schenectady	Merged with Our Lady of the Assumption Church (Italian) (Rotterdam) to form the Our Lady Queen of Peace Parish	
2010	Our Lady of the Assumption Church (Italian)	Rotterdam	Merged with Immaculate Conception Church (Schenectady) to form the Our Lady Queen of Peace Parish	
2010	Holy Family Church	Albany		
2010	St. John's-St. Ann's Church	Albany	Merged with St. Ann's Church; both merged again with St. James Church to form the St. Francis of Assisi Church in 2010	
2010	St. James Church	Albany	Merged with St. John's-Ann's Church to form the St. Francis of Assisi Church in 2010	
2010	St. Bernadette's Church	Berne	Merged with St. Lucy's (Altamont), of which it was a mission church	
2010	St. Mary's Church	Troy		
2010	St. Patrick's Church	Troy		
2010	St. Bonaventure's Church	Speigletown	Merged with Holy Trinity Church (Schaghticoke) to form Transfiguration Parish	
2010	Holy Trinity Church	Schaghticoke	Merged with St. Bonaventure's Church (Speigletown) to form Transfiguration Parish	
2011	Assumption/St. Paul Church	Mechanicville	Merged with St. Peter's Church (Stillwater) to form All Saints on the Hudson Parish	
2011	St. Peter's Church	Stillwater	Merged with Assumption/St. Paul (Mechanicville) to form All Saints on the Hudson Parish	
2012	St. Helen's Church	Schenectady	Merged with Our Lady of Fatima Church to form the St. Kateri Tekakwitha Parish	
2012	Our Lady of Fatima Church	Schenectady	Merged with St. Helen's Church to form St. Kateri Tekakwitha Parish	
2024	St. James Church	North Creek		
