= New York State Route 273 =

Former highway in New York

New York State Route 273
- Map of eastern New York and western Vermont with NY 273 highlighted in red

Route information
- Maintained by NYSDOT
- Length: 7.44 mi (11.97 km)
- Existed: January 1, 1949–March 24, 1980

Major junctions
- West end: US 4 near Whitehall village
- East end: Vermont state line in Hampton

Location
- Country: United States
- State: New York
- Counties: Washington

Highway system
- New York Highways; Interstate; US; State; Reference; Parkways
← NY 272	→ NY 274

New York State Route 273 (NY 273) was a state highway in northern Washington County, New York, in the United States. It began at an intersection with U.S. Route 4 (US 4) east of the village of Whitehall and ended at the Vermont state line in the town of Hampton, just east of a junction with NY 22A. The route passed through largely rural areas and entered only one community, the small hamlet of East Whitehall.

NY 273 followed part of the former routing of the Hampton and Whitehall Turnpike, a privately maintained highway that linked the village of Whitehall to a bridge over the Poultney River near the hamlet of Hampton, where it continued to Poultney, Vermont, in the 19th century. The portion of the turnpike west of East Whitehall became part of US 4 in 1927; however, US 4 was realigned in the mid-1940s to follow a new, more direct highway between Whitehall and the Vermont state line at Fair Haven, Vermont. NY 273 was assigned in 1949 to the path of old turnpike; however, the NY 273 designation was eliminated in 1980 as part of a highway maintenance swap between the state of New York and Washington County. The former routing of NY 273 west of NY 22A became County Route 18 (CR 18).

== Route description ==
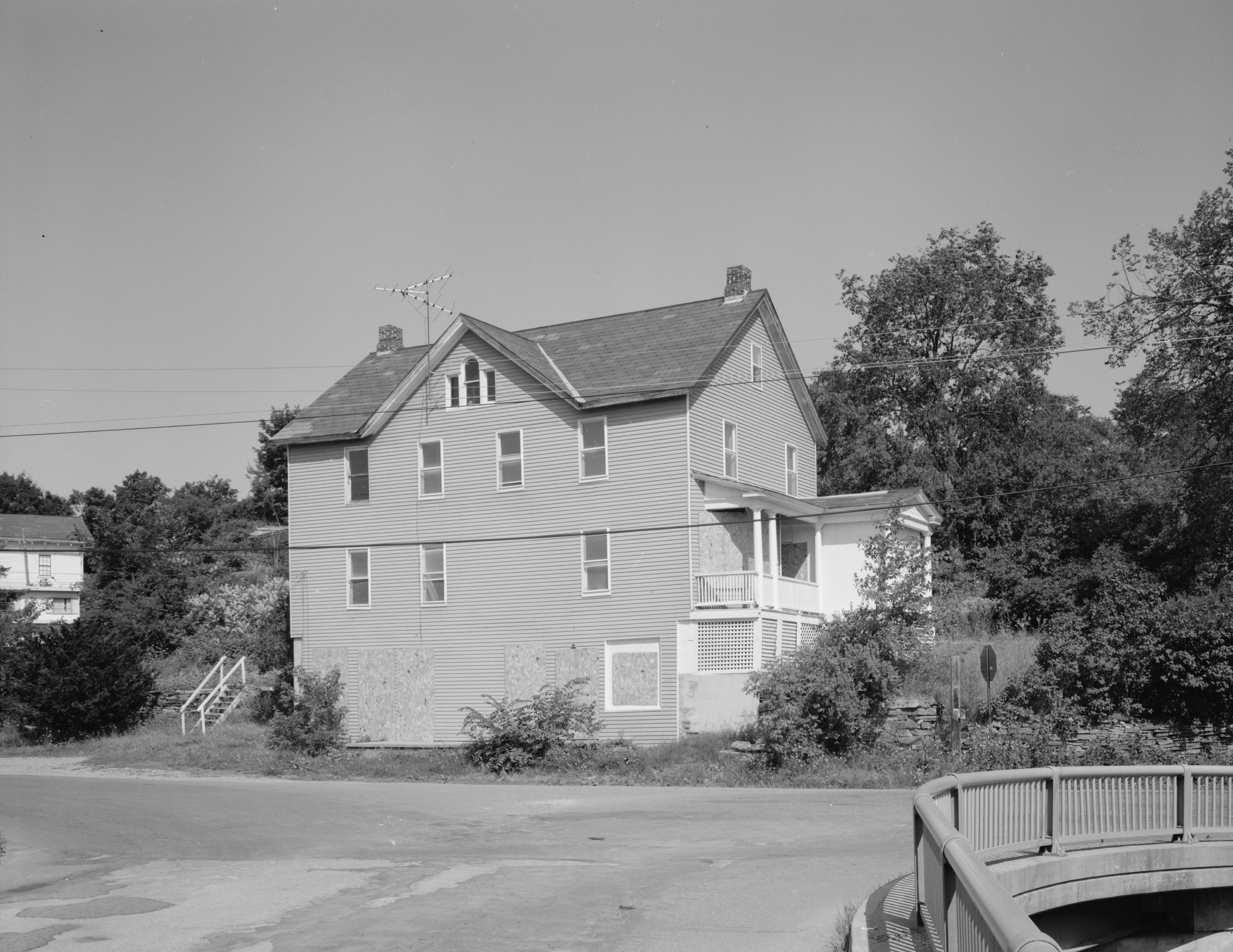
NY 273 in Hampton with the historic Campbell Hotel in view

NY 273 began at an intersection with US 4 east of the village of Whitehall in the town of Whitehall. After the intersection, the route passed the Our Lady of Angels Cemetery, where it turned to the southeast. NY 273 ran along the base of Ore Red Hill, outside of Whitehall. Near Ore Red Hill, the highway intersected with a local road, which connected to US 4. The route progressed to the southeast, entering the hamlet of East Whitehall, where it intersected with another local road.

NY 273 passed Bartholomew Hill and entered the town of Hampton, where it passed two mountains, Morris Hill, and the larger Thorn Hill. The highway then passed north of Crystal Lake, and entered the hamlet of Hampton. NY 273 intersected NY 22A in the small community before ending at the Vermont state line on a bridge over the Poultney River.

== History ==
=== Origins ===
On April 11, 1820, the New York State Legislature created the Hampton and Whitehall Turnpike Road Company, a privately owned tasked with building the Hampton and Whitehall Turnpike. According to the act incorporating the company, the highway would begin at a bridge in the town of Hampton (at the Poultney River) and follow "the most convenient route" to the community of Whitehall Landing on Wood Creek (the modern village of Whitehall) in the town of Whitehall.

The Hampton and Whitehall Turnpike Road Company was initially financed through 800 shares of stock valued at $20 each. Under the text of the act establishing the entity, only one toll gate was permitted on the turnpike. The toll charged at the gate varied by person; the exact amount was based on the vehicle used and the number of livestock and horses that were brought onto the roadway. By 1920, the turnpike company ceased to exist and the state of New York had plans in place to improve the portion of the turnpike west of the hamlet of East Whitehall. The improved road would be part of a state highway extending from the village of Whitehall to the Vermont state line at Fair Haven, Vermont. The contract for the project was awarded on April 5, 1921, and the highway was completed by 1926.

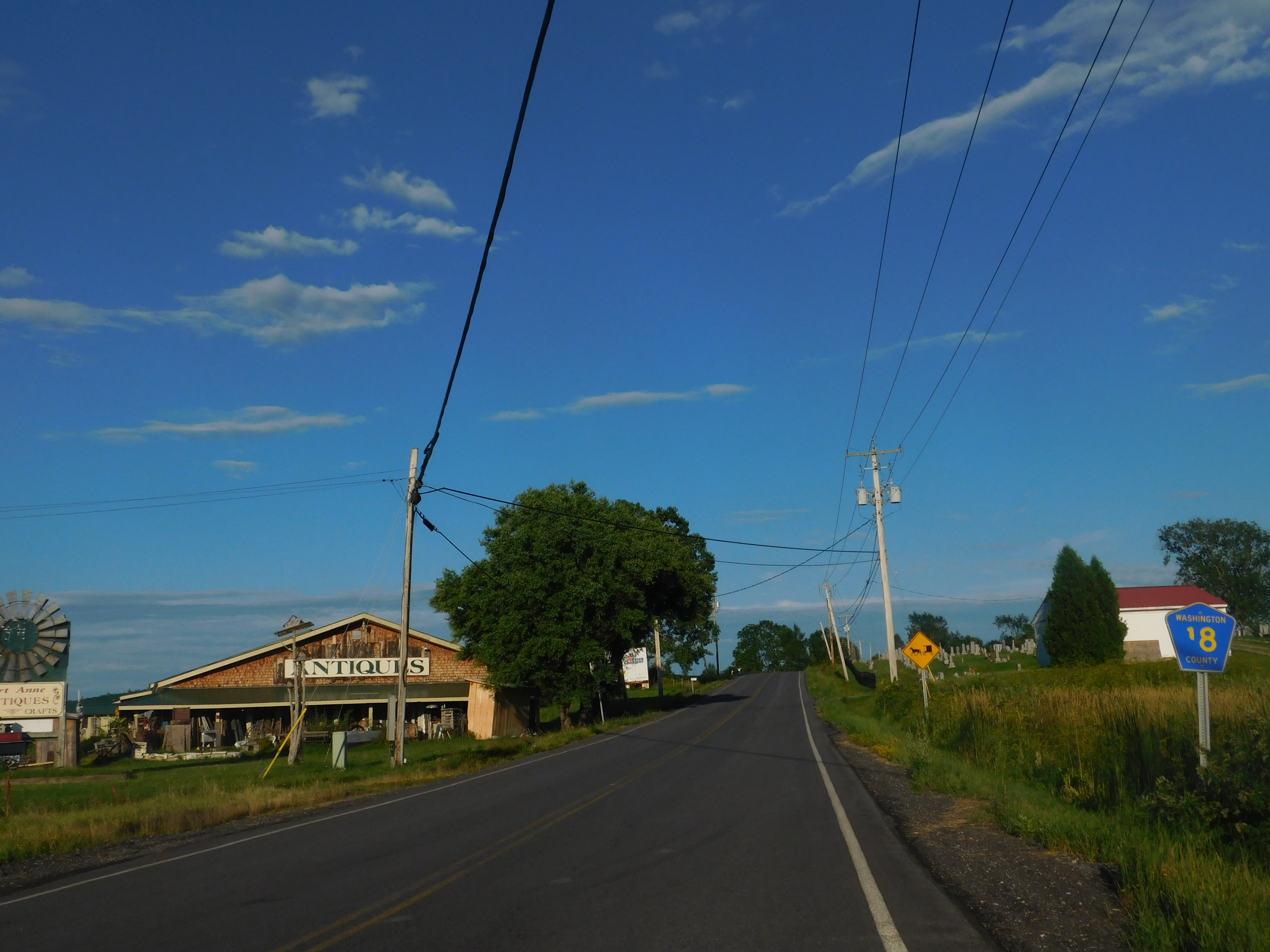
CR 18 reassurance shield in Whitehall

=== Designations ===
When the Whitehall–Fair Haven highway first opened, it did not have a designation. However, the road was part of the proposed routing of US 4, a route in the new U.S. Highway System. It officially became part of US 4 when the system was officially approved in November of that year. In the early 1940s, construction began on a new highway between Whitehall and Fair Haven that bypassed East Whitehall to the northwest. It was completed by 1946, at which time it became a realignment of US 4. On January 1, 1949, the old Hampton and Whitehall Turnpike was designated as NY 273, a new route connecting US 4 east of Whitehall to the Vermont state line in Hampton.

In 1980, NY 273 was removed from the state highway system as part of a highway maintenance swap between the state of New York and Washington County. On April 1, 1980, ownership and maintenance of NY 273 was transferred from the state of New York to Washington County; however, the NY 273 designation had officially ceased to exist one week earlier on March 24, 1980. Following the swap, the former routing of NY 273 was redesignated as CR 18 while the short connector to Vermont became part of CR 18A, then a loop route off NY 22A. CR 18A has since been reconfigured to follow a new highway leading directly from NY 22A to the Poultney River bridge.

== Major intersections ==
The entire route was in Washington County.

Location	mi	km	Destinations	Notes
Town of Whitehall	0.00	0.00	US 4	
Hampton	7.19	11.57	NY 22A	Hamlet of Hampton
Hampton	7.44	11.97	York Street	Continuation into Vermont
1.000 mi = 1.609 km; 1.000 km = 0.621 mi

== See also ==
- List of county routes in Washington County, New York
