= Dayton-Williams House =

Historic house in New York, United States

- U.S. National Register of Historic Places
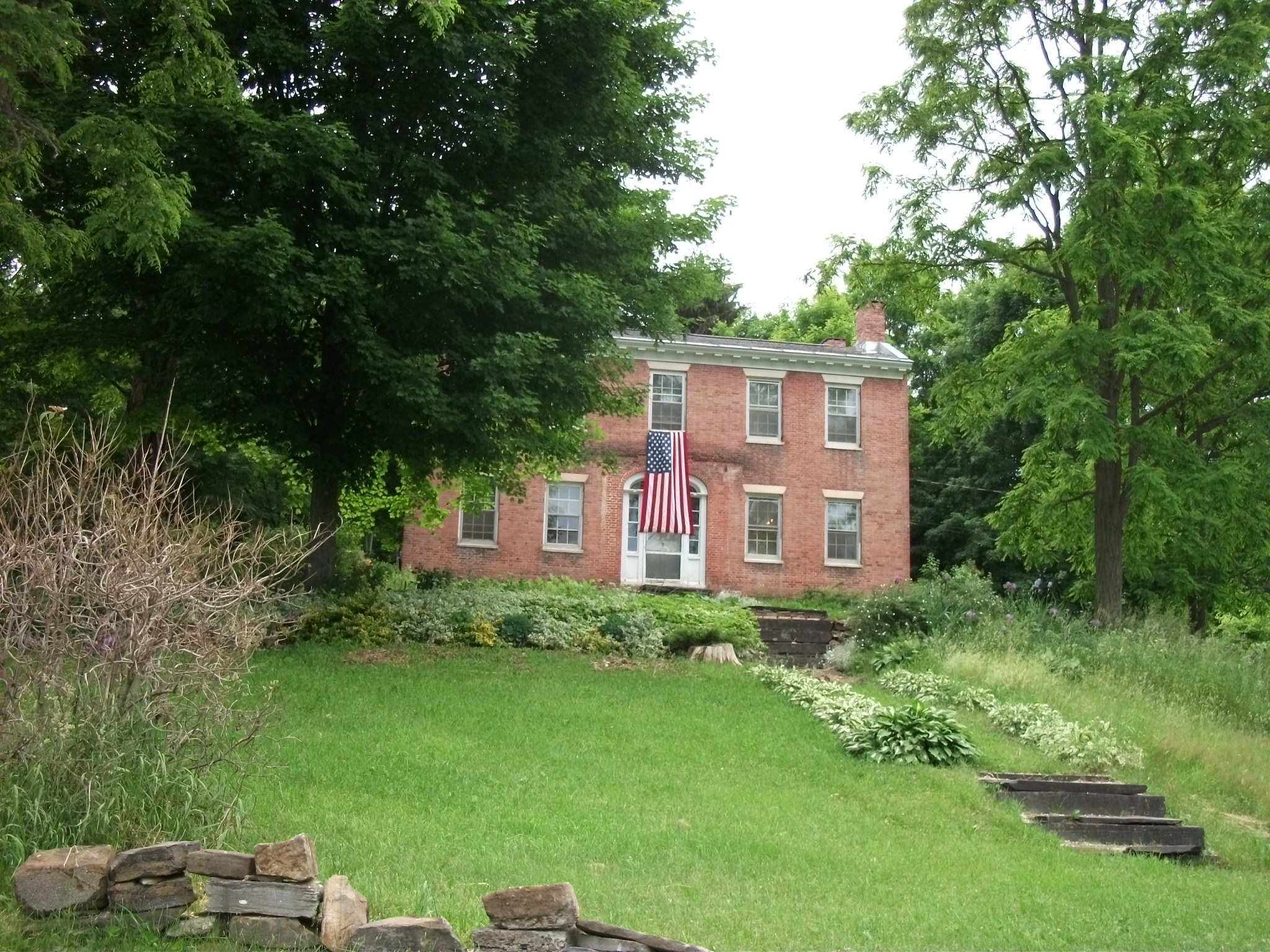
- Dayton-Williams House, June 2011

- Location within New York Location within the United States
- Location: 65 Dayton Hill Rd., Middle Granville, New York
- Coordinates: 43°26′2″N 73°17′4″W
- Area: 1.5 acres (0.61 ha)
- Architectural style: Federal
- NRHP reference No.: 06001000
- Added to NRHP: November 8, 2006

Dayton-Williams House is a historic home located at Middle Granville in Washington County, New York. It was built about 1820 and is a two-story, five-bay, center entrance, gable end brick building. It is in the Federal style. Also on the property is a retaining wall of fieldstone and slate and the foundation of a dwelling house built to house railroad workers in the 19th century.

It was listed on the National Register of Historic Places in 2006.
