= Pember Library and Museum =

Coordinates: 43.406211°N 73.263031°W

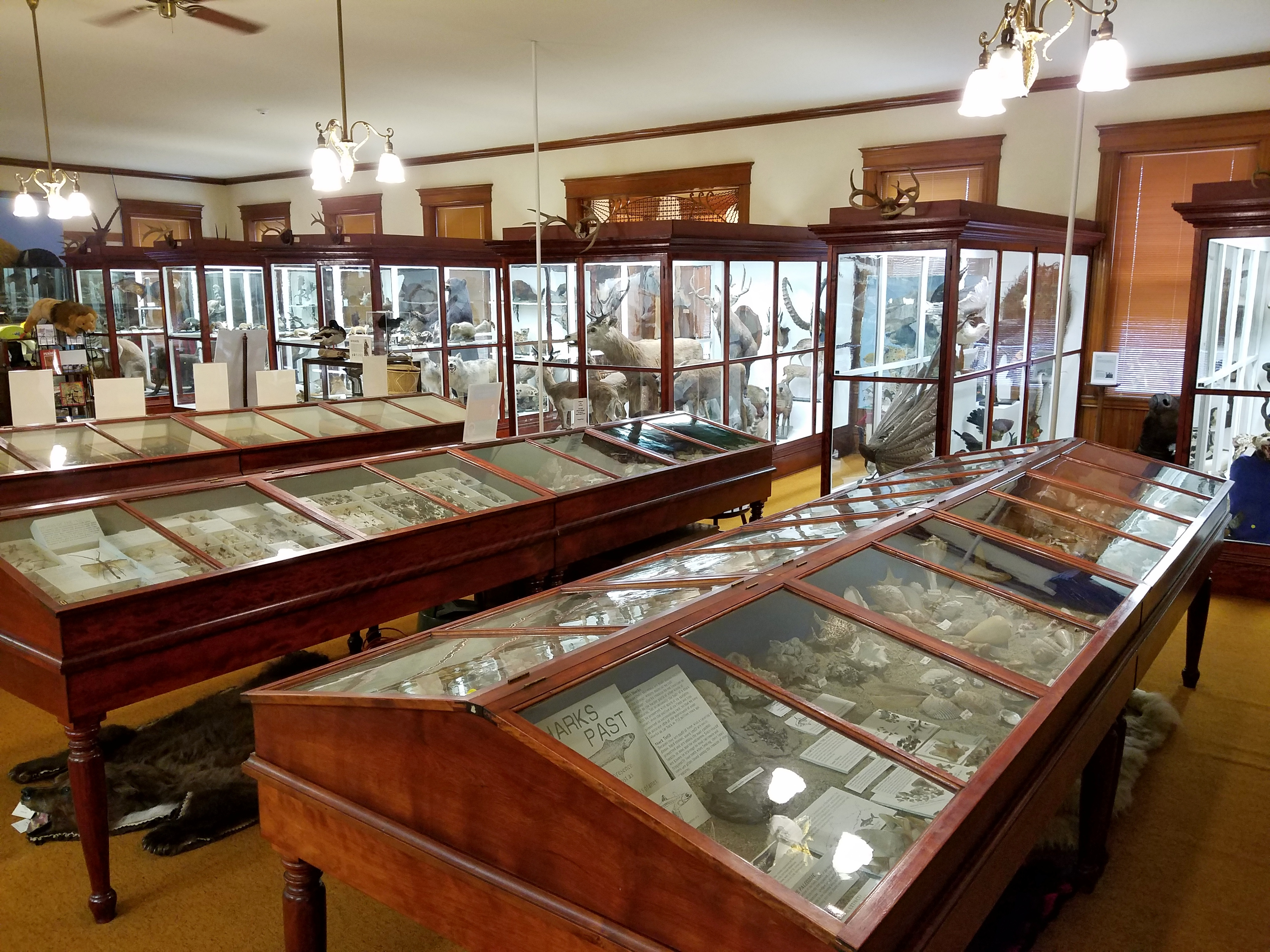
Pember Museum, interior view

The Pember Library and Museum is a public library and natural history museum located at 33 West Main Street, Granville, New York, USA. Both library and museum were established in 1909 by Franklin Tanner Pember and his wife Ellen Wood Pember in the building designed and built for this purpose. After Pember died in 1924, the museum's funding was depleted. It closed to the public for almost 40 years, until 1973 when the Friends of the Museum revived the building and its collections.
