= Granville Junior/Senior High School =

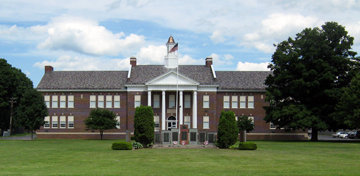
- Granville High School as viewed from Quaker Street in the Village of Granville, New York

Location
- 58 Quaker St; Granville, New York 12832; United States
- 43°23′59″N 73°15′46″W

Information
- Type: Public
- Established: 1929
- School district: Granville Central School District
- NCES District ID: 3612450
- Superintendent: Thomas McGurl
- NCES School ID: 361245001011
- Principal: Beecher Baker
- Teaching staff: 47.11 (on an FTE basis)
- Grades: 7-12
- Enrollment: 473 (2024-2025)
- Student to teacher ratio: 10.04
- Campus: Rural: Distant
- Colors: Blue and Gold
- Mascot: Mongolian Warrior on Horseback
- Team name: Golden Horde
- Newspaper: The Granville Gossip
- Yearbook: Granville
- Website: jrsr.granvillecsd.org/o/jrsr

Granville Junior/Senior High School, colloquially referred to as Granville High School, is a public secondary school located in the village of Granville, New York. Situated in Washington County and to the northeast of New York State's Capital District, it is part of the Granville Central School District. The school serves the district's 7th through 12th grade student population. About 10% of the building's students are drawn from neighboring communities in the state of Vermont.

The main high school building is located on Quaker Street in the Village of Granville and the school colors are blue and gold. The eastern portion of the school building houses primarily 9th through 12th grades while the west wing of the building is populated largely by 7th and 8th grade students. Additionally, district campuses include Mary J. Tanner Elementary School (K-3), and Granville Elementary School (4-6).

== School district ==
Map of the Granville Central School District and surrounding districts in both New York and Vermont.

The Granville Central School District, from which 90% of the student population is drawn, borders the Whitehall and Fort Ann school districts to the northwest, the Hartford school district to the west, and the Salem school district to the south. Poultney High School, the Rutland Southwest Supervisory Union (Wells Village School), and the Mettawee Community School (Pawlet and Rupert) border the district to the east in Vermont.

Approximately 10% of the building's students are drawn from neighboring communities in the state of Vermont. Tuition for these students was set at $8,200 for the 2013-2014 academic year and subsequently increased to $8,500 beginning in 2014-2015, well below the $9,382 figure nearby Poultney, Vermont charges students who live in communities outside the district.

== Demographics ==
=== Student demographics ===
As of 2007, 99% of students in the school were described as white. 1% of students were described as African American or Asian in descent. 45% of graduates in 2008 planned on attending a 4-year post secondary institution. 29% planned on attending a 2-year college. 3% joined the military. 4% entered the workforce. 20% were reported as "future plan unknown." Regarding graduation rate, 67% of the 2004 cohort had obtained a diploma by August 31, 2008.

=== Faculty demographics ===
The school employs approximately 100 faculty and staff (including teachers, monitors, aides, and paraprofessionals) as well as a total of two school-level administrators, excluding the director of special education. Between 2005 and 2008 the district experienced a turnover rate among teachers of nearly 20% each year. This rate became less notable as economic difficulties associated with the Great Recession made finding alternative employment in the education field difficult.

== Campus facilities ==
=== Buildings and building projects ===
Construction on the oldest portion of the building was carried out beginning in 1928 and finished the following year. This portion of the building is constructed in the Greek Revival architectural style.

Another major building project was completed from 1974 to 1975.

A much smaller facilities expansion occurred in 2009. This most recent building project provided upgraded first floor space for technology education, as well as four classrooms dedicated to offering special education services.

== Community relations ==
=== Budget ===
During the 2006–2007 school year, district-wide total expenditures per pupil equalled $15,256.00, $2074.00 below the New York State average of $17,330.00. In recent years, the district's annual budget has exceeded $20,000,000. Proposed expenditures for the 2007–2008 academic year were $21,737,394. This figure was $23.2 million during the 2008–2009 budget year.

In addition to the high school, these figures also included the two primary schools that feed into the junior/senior high school building: Mary J. Tanner Elementary School and Granville Elementary School.

== Academics ==
Since the beginning of the 2008–2009 academic year class rank has been calculated using a weighted average of all courses taken in grades nine through twelve. Individual course grades are not impacted by this weighting policy; grades are weighted only when school officials determine class rank.

College credit bearing courses are multiplied by a factor of 1.07 and honors courses by a factor of 1.04. As a consequence of this policy, students are encouraged to enroll in academically challenging courses that better prepare them for post-secondary education. In addition, it is more difficult for students enrolled in predominantly academically inferior classes to rank near the top of the class based upon cumulative average.

=== College-credit academic programs ===
Higher motivated students may pursue more rigorous educational programs while at the school. These credit-bearing programs enable graduates to save thousands of tuition dollars as they are able to complete their college undergraduate degree one to two semesters ahead of peers who didn't pursue college-level programs.

However, the district struggles to provide a relevant education for less-motivated members of the student population.

==== State University of New York programs ====
Comparable to the program outlined above, several Granville faculty members have achieved status as instructors in the State University of New York (SUNY) system. Participating students can enroll and earn college credit after they have successfully completed the Granville and SUNY requirements. The course offerings are made available through the SUNY University in the High Schools program.

- SUNY Plattsburgh - North Country High School Model OAS: The North Country High School Model OAS (Organization of American States), is a college-credit bearing course in Latin American Studies offered to seniors in the spring semester providing them the opportunity to improve skills related to collaboration, cooperation and extemporaneous speaking.

==== Board of Cooperative Educational Services programs (New Visions) ====
Seniors are able to participate in the Washington-Saratoga-Warren-Hamilton-Essex (WSWHE) Board of Cooperative Educational Services (BOCES) programs in Engineering and Health Careers Exploration as an alternative to traditional junior and senior years at the high school. Students admitted to this college credit bearing program engage in a combination of classroom and practical professional experiences.

=== Local newspaper awards ===
During each academic year The Chronicle, an area newspaper based in Glens Falls, New York, consults the high school administration and recognizes students whose contributions exemplify both academic and athletic excellence. Chosen students are presented with a plaque as well as featured in the newspaper, an area weekly with a circulation near 30,000 copies.

== See also ==
- University of the State of New York
- Regents Examinations
- Board of Cooperative Educational Services (BOCES)
- List of school districts in New York
