= South Granville Congregational Church =

Historic church in New York, United States

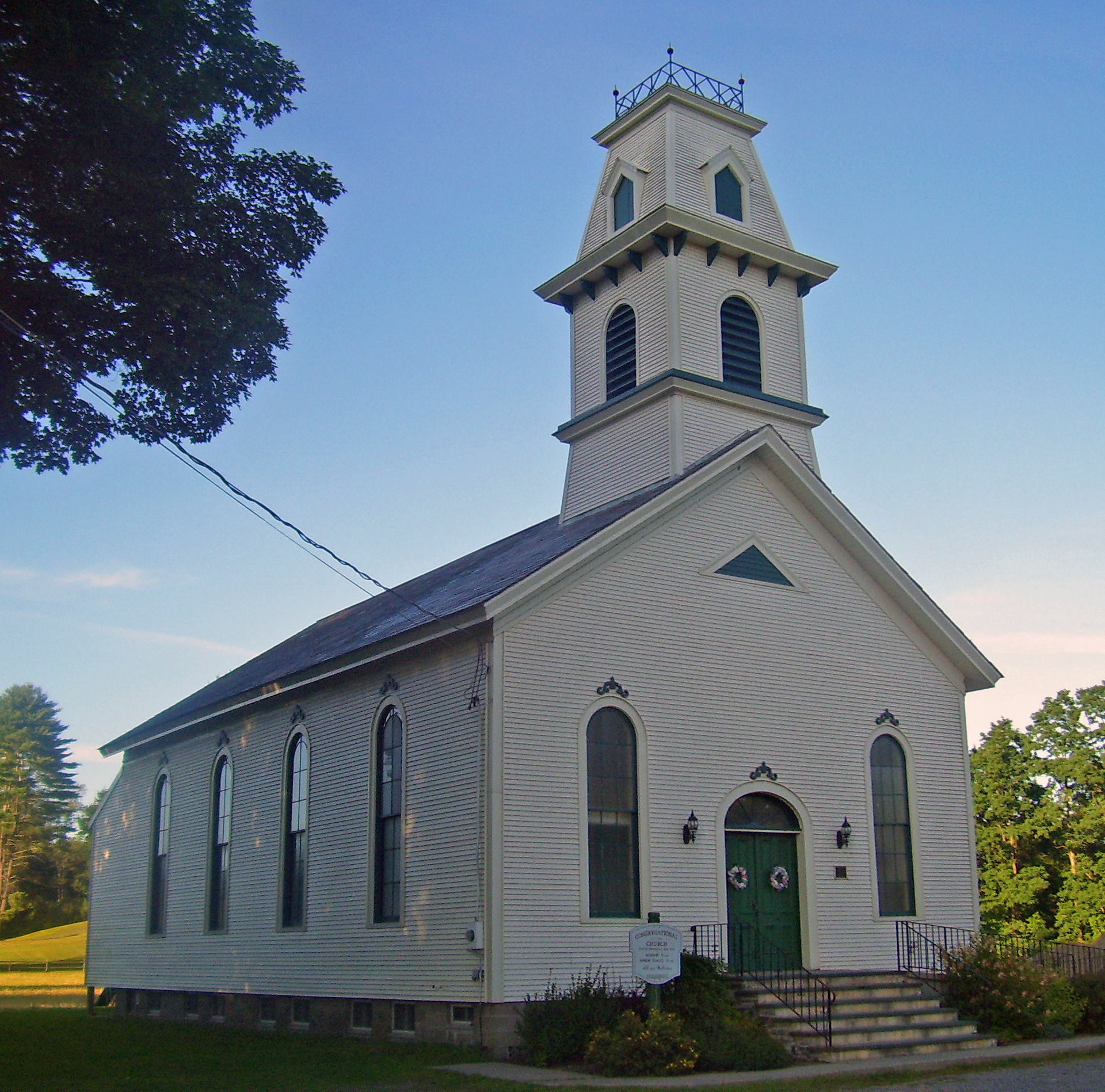
- South elevation and west profile, 2008

Religion
- Affiliation: Congregationalist
- Leadership: Rick Backus, Senior Pastor

Location
- Location: Granville, New York, US
- Interactive map of South Granville Congregational Church
- Coordinates: 43°22′19″N 73°17′13″W

Architecture
- Style: Late Gothic Revival
- Completed: 1847; renovated and expanded 1873

Specifications
- Direction of façade: south
- Length: 56 feet (17 m)
- Width: 34 feet (10 m)
- Materials: Wood, concrete, slate

Website
- sgcongregationalchurch.org

The South Granville Congregational Church is located on NY 149 in the hamlet of South Granville, in the town of Granville, New York, United States. The current church building is the fourth in the church's history. It is a white frame church built in the 1840s; nearby is a Greek Revival parsonage of similar vintage. The church was extensively renovated and expanded in 1873, giving it more of a Late Gothic Revival appearance.

It was one of the first churches founded in the town when settlement began after the Revolution. One of its early pastors was Lemuel Haynes, the first African-American ordained minister in North America. In 2005 it and its parsonage were listed on the National Register of Historic Places.

== Property ==
The church and parsonage are on a small unpaved semi-circular drive on the north side of Route 149 at the western edge of South Granville. The church faces southwest at the head of the drive, with the parsonage to its south. In the center of the drive is a landscaped green with a state historical marker.

=== Church ===
The church building is a three-by-four-bay one-story church on a stone foundation sided in vinyl over clapboard topped with a gabled roof. A two-stage bell tower with mansard roof rises from the center. The rounded-arched windows on the southern (front) facade are topped with decorative carved scrolls.

On the inside, double doors with oak molding lead from the narthex to the sanctuary. In it the nave has 12 rows of oak pews flanking the center aisle with smaller side aisles. All have carved S-shaped scroll arms and a brass number plate at the end. Oak also is used for the triple-arched pulpit and the rail around the choir loft.

The ceiling has coves on adjacent walls to improve the sanctuary's acoustics, to the point that local community concerts are often held at South Granville despite the presence of larger churches in the region. Five brass chandeliers provide light, along with wall sconces. The window behind the choir is filled with a stained glass depiction of the church; the other windows have colored glass framing stippled glass panes.

=== Parsonage ===
The parsonage, just south of the church, is a two-story frame house on slate foundation with a slate-shingled gabled roof. It is sided in clapboard, with pilasters at the corners and the center of the main block, supporting a plain frieze and box cornice. The main block is flanked by two smaller wings with a smaller kitchen block attached to the rear.

In the front door there is a beveled, recessed glass pane. On the first floor there is much original trim, including doors. The left wing has some of its original hardware; the right its arched entryway to the main block. Upstairs the floors have most of their original paint, and the walls their lath and plaster.

== History ==
South Granville was first settled in 1789, at a time when the border between New York and Vermont (then still an independent nation) had not been established, and settlers were hoping to be incorporated into the latter. It soon grew into a thriving community. That year a group of residents called an ecclesiastical council met there in order to establish a place of worship. They were assisted by some ministers of Congregational churches from Vermont, so they chose to be part of that denomination.

Their first church was built a mile (1.6 km) west of the village at what is now the intersection of Lee Road and Route 149. The congregation grew, and built another church in 1807, on the site of the current one. Sixteen years later, Lemuel Haynes became pastor. His years at South Granville, the last of his life, were productive. The church grew and he was highly regarded in the community. He and his family are buried in a nearby cemetery, and his nearby house has since been designated a National Historic Landmark.

In 1843, the congregation established a committee to build a parsonage. A year later, it was done, at a cost of $615 ($21,000 in contemporary dollars). It was used for meetings and social gatherings, and rented out when not occupied by a minister. Four years later, continued growth necessitated the construction of new church, the basis of the current building. It was completed for $3,700 ($128,000 in contemporary dollars), and included a tower with a bell cast by a West Troy foundry.

There have been very few changes to the church since then. The ceiling has been modified somewhat, including the coves. Modern heating systems were added to the parsonage around 1900, and sometime later in the 20th century one of the upstairs bedrooms was converted into a bathroom.

== See also ==
- National Register of Historic Places listings in Washington County, New York
