= Franklin Tanner Pember =

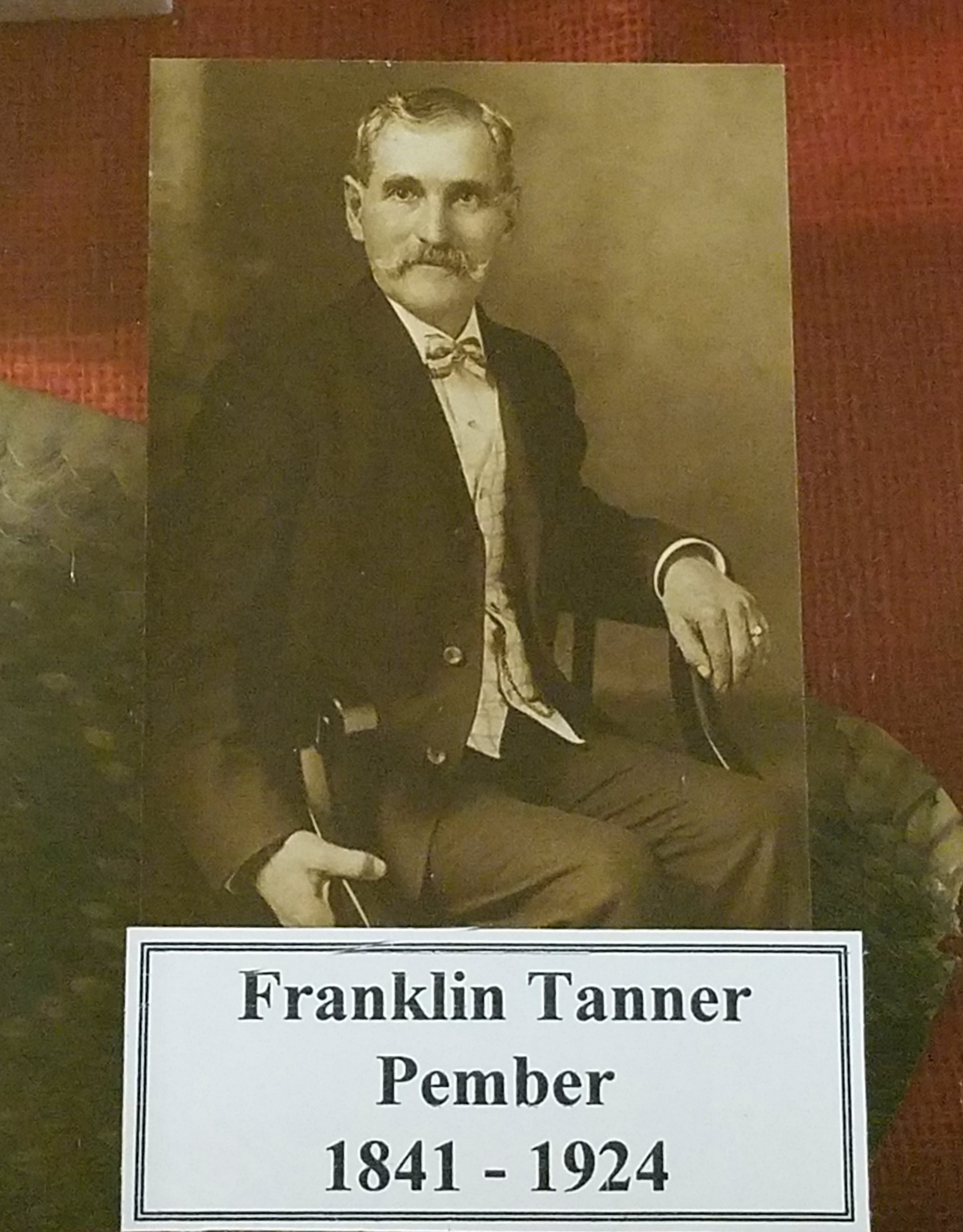
- Born: November 2, 1841
- Died: April 6, 1924 (aged 82)
- Occupations: Entrepreneur, naturalist and philanthropist.
- Known for: Founded the Pember Library; Founded the Pember Museum of Natural History; Constructed the Pember Opera House

Franklin Tanner Pember (November 2, 1841 – April 6, 1924) was an American entrepreneur, naturalist, and philanthropist. He was the founder of the Pember Library and Museum located in Granville, New York. Additionally, Pember played a crucial role in the construction of the Pember Opera House and generously provided land for the development of community sewer systems.

== Early life ==
Pember was born in South Granville, New York, as the youngest child and only son of Reuel and Maria Tanner Pember. His sister Emeline died at the age of four, and his sister Delia died when she was 19. Pember spent his formative years on a prosperous family farm located two miles away from South Granville, along the Hartford road. He received his education at a nearby one-room schoolhouse.

== Career ==
He was a successful businessman, engaging in various ventures throughout his career. One of his earliest enterprises involved the nursery business, where he specialized in selling fruit and ornamental trees, shrubs, plants, and flowers. Furthermore, Pember expanded his business endeavors as a fur trader. He partnered with James L. Prouty, his former agent for nursery stock and fur, and together they established the firm of Pember and Prouty, Commission Dealers in Furs and Skins, in New York City in 1873. Initially located at 129 W. Broadway, the firm later moved to 164-166 S. Fifth Avenue. Pember and Prouty purchased furs from various regions across the United States and Canada, exporting them in substantial quantities to European markets.

== Hobbies ==
From 1859 to 1861, he pursued the study of science at the recently established Fort Edward Collegiate Institute, a college preparatory school. Remarkably, by the age of 21, Pember had already developed skills as a hunter, trader, and taxidermist. Over the course of the next four decades, he dedicated himself to collecting a diverse array of specimens, including birds and mammals, bird nests and eggs, shells, insects, plants, as well as rocks and minerals. His extensive collection served as the foundation for the establishment of the Pember Museum of Natural History. Moreover, Pember played a significant role in establishing a network that connected professional collectors with museums, fostering collaboration and knowledge-sharing in the field.

== Personal life ==
Franklin Pember married Ellen Jane Wood of South Granville, New York on February 4, 1868, the only child of David and Caroline Thompson Wood, wealthy farmers and cheese dealers. During the years in which Pember was involved in the fur business they lived in New York City, coming home to Granville for summers and occasional brief visits. They never owned a house in New York City, preferring to rent furnished rooms.
