= Lakes Region Free Press =

- Type: Weekly newspaper
- Format: Tabloid
- Owner(s): Manchester Newspapers Inc.
- Publisher: John Manchester
- Editor: John Manchester
- Headquarters: P.O. Box 330, Granville, NY 12832 Washington County United States)
- Circulation: 7,400
- Website: https://nyvtmedia.com/lakes-region-freepress-online-edition/

Lakes Region Free Press is a newspaper based in Granville, New York, published weekly on Thursdays. The newspaper covers Poultney, Vermontm and surrounding communities in Western Rutland County, Vermont, and the Lakes Region of western Vermont and eastern New York state. The paper is owned by Manchester Newspapers Inc., and the circulation is estimated to be around 7,400. Manchester Newspapers is a member of the Vermont Lakes Region Chamber of Commerce. The Lakes Region Free Press is the newspaper of record for the town of New Haven, Castleton, and Pawlet, Vermont. The editor is John Manchester.
