= New York State Route 22A =

State highway in Washington County, New York, US

New York State Route 22A
- Map of Washington County in eastern New York with NY 22A highlighted in red

Route information
- Auxiliary route of NY 22
- Maintained by NYSDOT
- Length: 10.61 mi (17.08 km)
- Existed: December 19, 1945–present

Major junctions
- South end: NY 22 in Granville
- North end: VT 22A at the Vermont state line in Hampton

Location
- Country: United States
- State: New York
- Counties: Washington

Highway system
- New York Highways; Interstate; US; State; Reference; Parkways
← NY 22	→ NY 22B

New York State Route 22A (NY 22A) is a short north–south state highway located within Washington County, New York, in the United States. The route extends for 10.6 miles (17.1 km) from an intersection with NY 22 in the town of Granville to the Vermont state line in the town of Hampton, where it becomes Vermont Route 22A (VT 22A). NY 22A was originally designated as New York State Route 286 in the 1930 renumbering of state highways in New York. It was renumbered to its current designation in the early 1940s.

== Route description ==
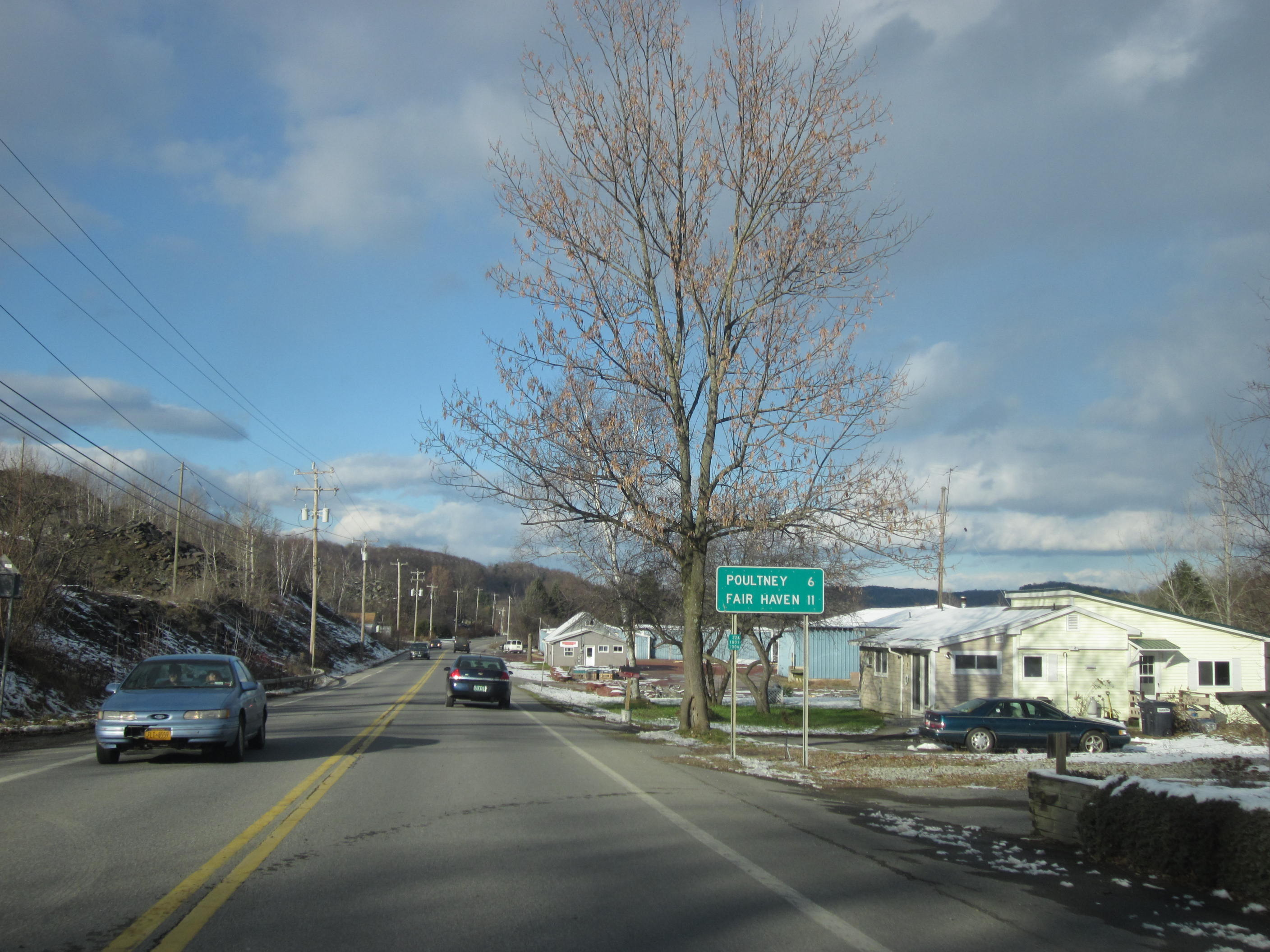
NY 22A, looking north through Middle Granville

NY 22A begins at an intersection with NY 22 in the town of Granville. Crossing north through the hamlet of Middle Granville, NY 22A parallels the Mettawee River, reaching a junction with the eastern terminus of County Route 23 (CR 23). Passing a few homes through the center of Middle Granville, the route junctions with the terminus of CR 24. NY 22A continues north alongside the Mettawee, passing out of Middle Granville and into the rural areas of the town of Granville. At a fork, CR 21 proceeds north, while NY 22A turns northeast and crosses the Mettawee.

After a short eastern segment, NY 22A bends northeast again, entering the hamlet of Raceville, a small residential community. Rapidly approaching the Vermont state line, the route continues northeast through Granville, soon crossing into the town of Hampton. In Hampton, NY 22A turns northwest at a fork that marks the beginning of CR 20, which runs to the state border. Crossing northwest then northeast through Hampton, the route soon reaches a junction with CR 18, which once marked a junction with NY 273. At this junction, NY 22A enters the hamlet of Hampton, passing multiple homes before reaching a junction with CR 18A, which runs to the state line.

Just north of CR 18A, NY 22A turns northwest and leaves the hamlet of Hampton, crossing through the rural town of Hampton. Continuing a parallel with the Vermont state line, the route soon bends north and reaches the Poultney River, which marks the northern terminus of NY 22A. North of the Poultney River, the route continues north into Fair Haven, Vermont as VT 22A (Main Street).

== History ==
What is now NY 22A was first designated as NY 286 as part of the 1930 renumbering of state highways in New York. It began at NY 22 in Middle Granville and went north to the Vermont state line, where it continued as VT 30A. The alignment of NY 22A was constructed in 1933 with bituminous macadam pavement. The road was 9 feet (2.7 m) wide in its lanes and contained 7 feet (2.1 m) shoulders. An alternate route of NY 286 along modern CR 20 and Greenfield Lane in Hampton and Granville, College, and York streets in Poultney, Vermont, was designated as NY 286A in New York and VT 286A in that state c. 1938. The New York half of the designation was short-lived as it was eliminated by the following year; however, VT 286A remained in place until the early 1940s. NY 286 was renumbered to NY 22A on December 19, 1945 as part of a bi-state agreement between New York and Vermont. Vermont followed suit by renumbering VT 30A to VT 22A.

The roadway of NY 22A was reconstructed in 1960 with concrete that made the road 10 feet (3.0 m) wide. The road was widened to 12 feet (3.7 m) wide in 1970 and repaved once again in 1988.

== Major intersections ==
The entire route is in Washington County.

Location	mi	km	Destinations	Notes
Town of Granville	0.00	0.00	NY 22 – Salem, Comstock	Southern terminus; hamlet of Middle Granville
Hampton	7.52	12.10	CR 18 – Whitehall	Former eastern terminus of NY 273; hamlet of Hampton
Hampton	10.61	17.08	VT 22A north (Main Street)	Continuation into Vermont
1.000 mi = 1.609 km; 1.000 km = 0.621 mi
