= Lemuel Haynes =

American clergyman and activist (1753–1833)

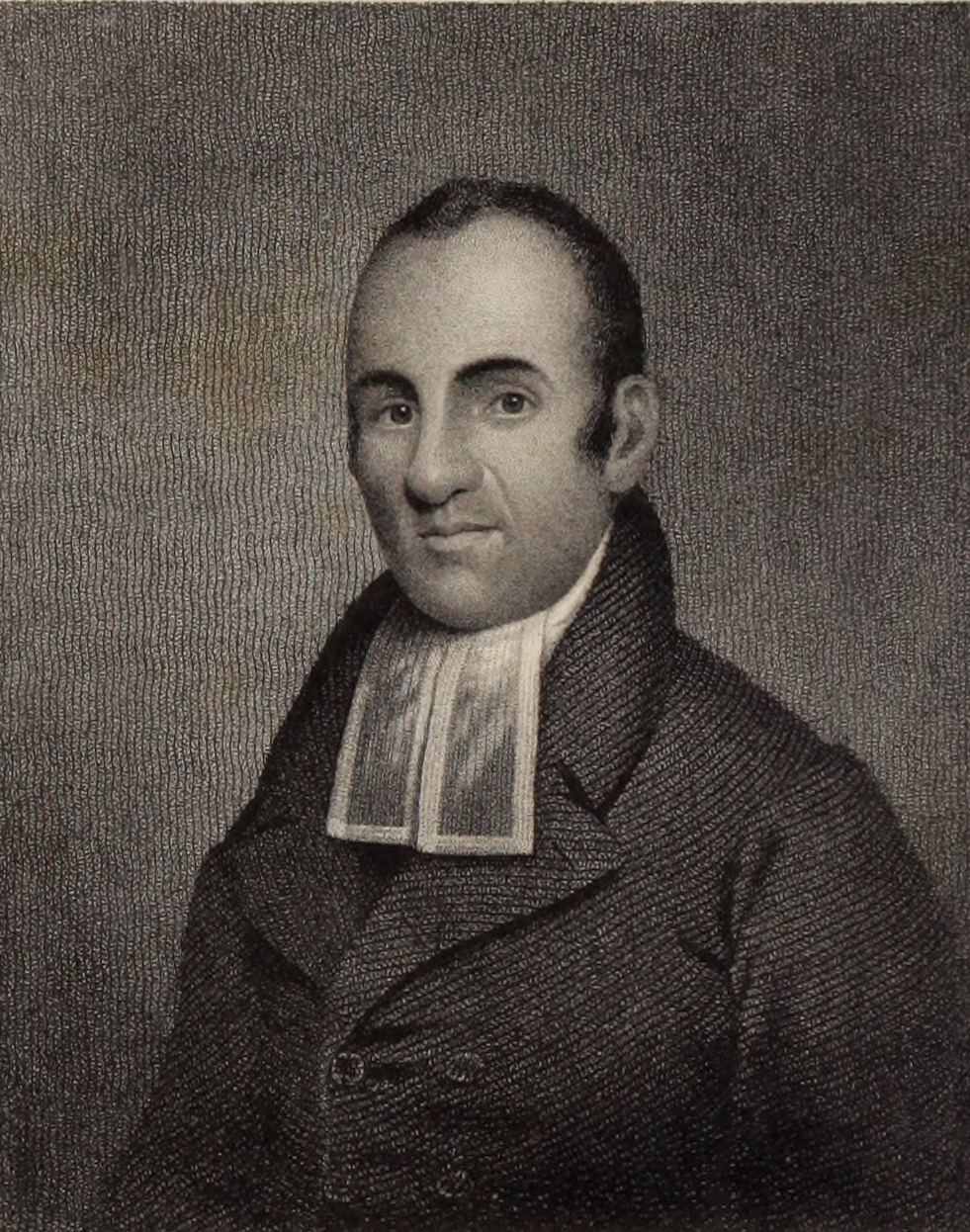
- Frontispiece of 1837's Sketches of the Life and Character of the Rev. Lemuel Haynes, A.M.
- Born: July 18, 1753; West Hartford, Connecticut Colony, British America
- Died: September 28, 1833 (aged 80); South Granville, New York, U.S.
- Resting place: Lee-Oatman Cemetery, South Granville, New York, U.S.
- Occupation: Congregational minister
- Years active: 1780-1833
- Known for: The first credentialed African-American clergyman in the United States

Lemuel Haynes (July 18, 1753 – September 28, 1833) was an American clergyman. A veteran of the American Revolution, Haynes was the first black man in the United States to be ordained as a minister.

Haynes was a native of West Hartford, Connecticut, and was the son of an African American man and a white woman. He spent much of his childhood as an indentured servant in the house of a Granville, Massachusetts, farmer. A regular churchgoer, he began to preach as a boy. He served in the militia during the American Revolution, including garrison duty at the recently captured Fort Ticonderoga in 1776. Haynes also became an anti-slavery activist. In addition to arguing against involuntary servitude and preaching against the slave trade, Haynes also advocated against the colonization movement, arguing that people of African descent living in the United States should be entitled to the same rights as other citizens, and that having them resettle in Africa would not be beneficial.

Ordained in the Congregational church in 1785, Haynes pastored a church in Torrington, Connecticut, for three years. In 1788, Haynes accepted a call to pastor the West Parish Church of Rutland, Vermont (now West Rutland's United Church of Christ), where he remained for the next 30 years. He then moved to a temporary pastorate at Manchester, Vermont, and finally to South Granville, New York, where he was pastor of South Granville Congregational Church.

Haynes died in South Granville in 1833 and was buried at Lee-Oatman Cemetery.

== Early life and education ==
Haynes was born on July 18, 1753, in West Hartford, Connecticut, reportedly to a Caucasian mother of some status and an unknown man who was African or African-American. The identity of Haynes's mother has long been the subject of debate among historians and theologians. The most prevalent theory is that she was a servant named Lucy or Alice Fitch who worked for the John Haynes family of West Hartford. Another theory suggests that Fitch was a stand-in, willing or unwilling, for his real mother. According to this theory, Haynes's mother was a member of the prominent Goodwin family of Hartford who tried to avoid the scandal associated with giving birth while unmarried by staying with the Haynes family. Both theories suggest that Lucy (or Alice) Fitch was fired by the Haynes family after she attested to or was accused of being the mother. She named her son Haynes, either to give him respectability or to take revenge against the Hayneses for firing her.

At the age of five months, Lemuel Haynes was given over to indentured servitude to Deacon David Rose, a blind farmer of Granville, Massachusetts. Part of the indenture required Rose to see to Haynes's education, and by accompanying Rose to church, he became exposed to Calvinistic religious doctrine, including the works of Jonathan Edwards, George Whitefield, and Philip Doddridge, who all became strong influences on Haynes' religious outlook. According to Haynes, while he fulfilled his indenture obligations to David Rose, Rose's wife Elizabeth (Fowler) (d. 1775) was especially devoted to his upbringing, to the point of treating him as though he was her own child. In fact, Haynes recalled at one point that Mrs. Rose “had peculiar attachment to me: she treated me as though I was her own child, I remember it was a saying among the neighbors that she loved Lemuel more than her own children.” His indenture ended when he was twenty-one.

== Military service ==
In 1774, as one of his first acts as a free man, Haynes joined the minutemen of Granville. In 1775, he marched with his militia company to Roxbury, Massachusetts, following the news of the Battles of Lexington and Concord. In 1776, he accompanied them in the garrisoning of the recently captured Fort Ticonderoga. He remained on garrison duty until contracting Typhus, which caused him to return home. He returned to the Rose homestead, even though his indenture had by this point expired.

Although his service in the Continental Army was brief, Haynes absorbed a deep understanding of both New Divinity theology and republican ideology. This knowledge would subsequently influence his writings on pro-black and antislavery issues. Even after the Revolutionary War technically came to an end, Haynes asserted that the Revolution could not truly be considered over as long as slavery still existed.

== Writings ==
During the American Revolution, Haynes began to write extensively, criticizing the slave trade and slavery. He continued these activities after the war, and also began to prepare sermons, family prayers and other theological works. The Scripture, abolitionism, and republicanism affected his published writings, in which Haynes argued that slavery denied black people their natural rights to "Life, Liberty and the pursuit of Happiness".

In 1776, he penned a rebuttal to the Declaration of Independence in which he combined his Calvinist beliefs with the forward-thinking independence ideals of his time, titled "Liberty Further Extended: Our Free thoughts on the illegality of Slave-keeping: Wherein those arguments that Are used in its vindication Are plainly confuted. Together with a humble Address to such as are Concerned in the Practice." In this essay, Haynes advocated for the emancipation of enslaved peoples in America, condemning slavery as a sin and highlighting the irony of slaveowners pursuing liberty from Britain while depriving it to so many on American soil. "Liberty Further Extended" was never published during Haynes's lifetime; it was discovered only in 1983, more than two centuries after he wrote it, by Ruth Bogin in a Harvard University archive.

Haynes quotes the Declaration of Independence heavily in "Liberty Further Extended," underscoring the former's emphasis on equality and liberty as unalienable rights and pointing out its irreconcilability with the institution of slavery. He characterizes liberty as a divine gift given to all men, stressing that "an African, or, in other terms, … a Negro … has an undeniable right to his Liberty" –– equally "as good a right … in common with Englishmen." To that end, "the practice of slave-keeping, which so much abounds in this Land" is "illicit," because "whatever acts are passed in any Earthly Court… Derogatory to those Edicts that are passed in the Court of Heaven, [are] void."

An overarching theme of "Liberty Further Extended" is that slavery is an offense to God. At the end of the piece, Haynes implores slaveowners to be consistent in their commitment to liberty, not only for the sake of being good American patriots and realizing the principles outlined the Declaration of Independence, but also for the sake of being good Christians.

== Ministry ==
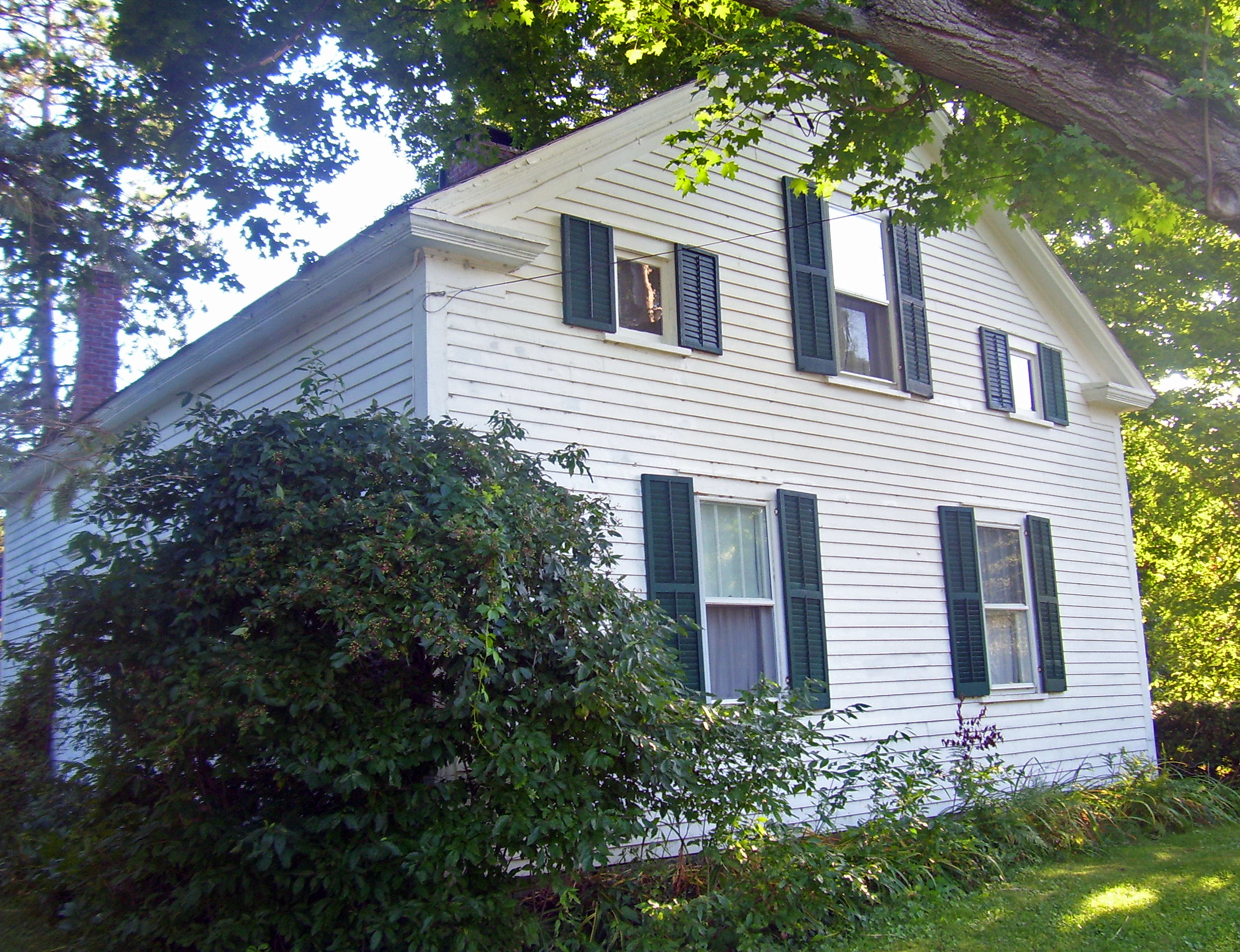
Haynes' last home, in South Granville, now a National Historic Landmark

After his militia service, Haynes studied theology with members of the clergy in Connecticut and Massachusetts. In 1779, he went to live with the Reverend Daniel Farrand in Canaan, approximately twenty-five miles west of Granville in northwestern Connecticut. Farrand taught Haynes Latin, theology, and homiletics in exchange for Haynes's help on his farm. The following year, Haynes moved to the nearby town of Wintonbury, where the Reverend William Bradford instructed him in Greek and found him a local teaching job.

In November 1780, Farrand and two other clergymen granted Haynes his license to preach, along with a position as temporary 'supply' to his home congregation in Middle Granville. About the same time, he began his many years of service as a missionary in the wilderness of the New Hampshire Grants, soon to be known as the independent Vermont Republic and finally the American state of Vermont.

Haynes was ordained in 1785 and settled at Hemlock Congregational Church in Torrington, Connecticut. He was the first African American ordained in the United States. On March 28, 1788, Haynes left his pastorate at Torrington to accept a call at the West Parish Church of Rutland, Vermont (now West Rutland's United Church of Christ), where he led the mostly white congregation for 30 years –– a relationship between pastor and congregation rare in Haynes’s time for its length as well as its racial dynamic. During his time in Rutland, the church grew in membership from forty-two congregants to over three hundred and fifty. He remained an ardent defender of Calvinistic orthodoxy, opposing the emerging ideologies of Arminianism and universalism.

Haynes continued to write and speak about slavery. His contemporary white republican and abolitionist thinkers saw slavery as a liability to the new country, and argued for eventual slave expatriation to Africa. The American Colonization Society (founded in 1817) was the largest colonization group. Included among its supporters were people such as James Madison, James Monroe, Henry Clay and Daniel Webster. In contrast, however, Haynes continued to passionately argue along Calvinist lines that God's providential plan would defeat slavery and lead to the harmonious integration of the races as equals.

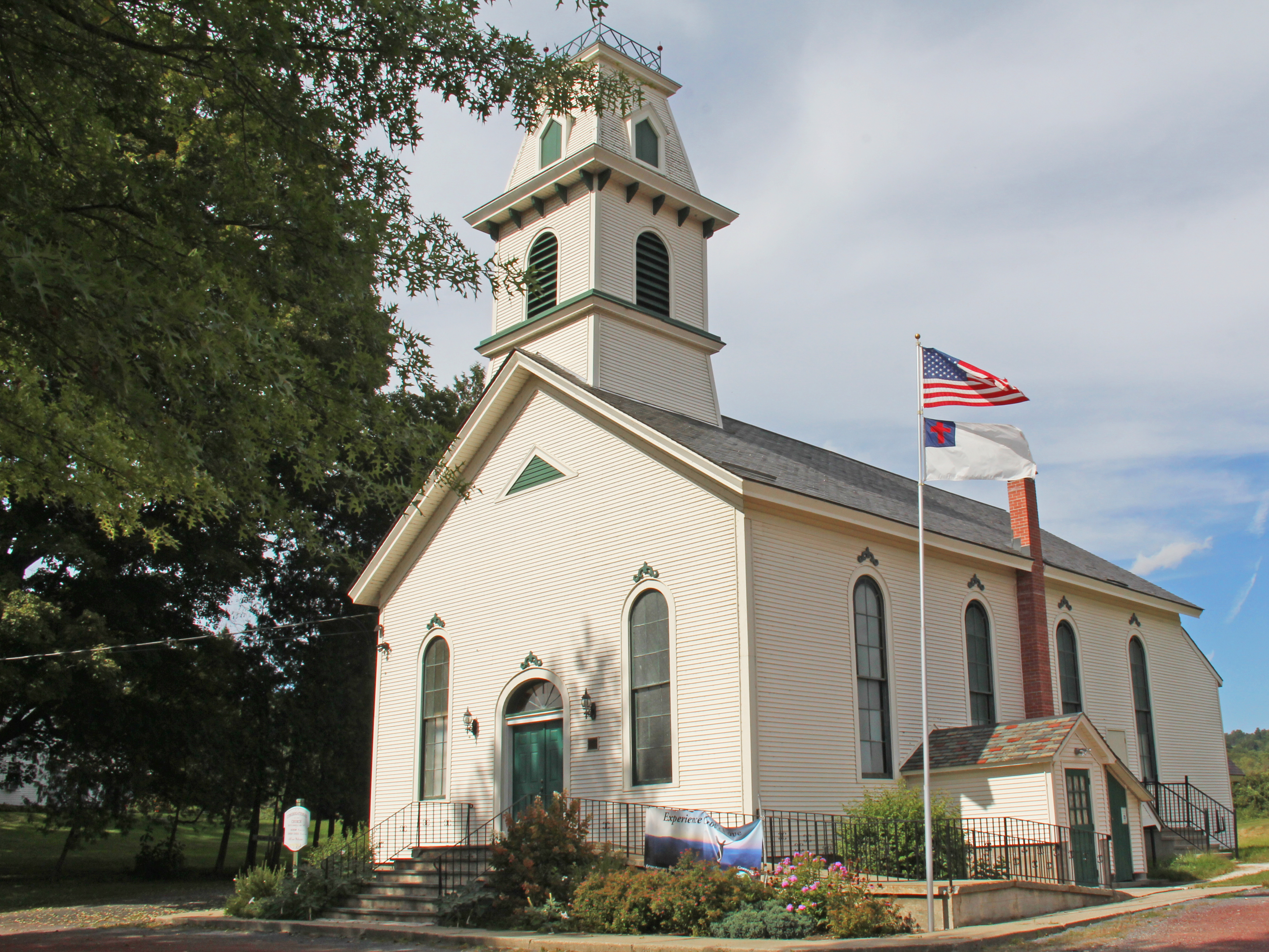
South Granville Congregational Church.

In 1818, the Rutland Church Council dismissed Haynes. Historians debate the reasoning behind this dismissal. Some cite political differences, on the basis that Haynes was a lifelong Federalist whose politics conflicted with those of the council. Others believe the decision may have been racially motivated. He took a temporary post in Manchester, Vermont. His final pastorate was in South Granville, New York where he was minister of the South Granville Congregational Church from 1822 to 1833.

Haynes died in South Granville, New York, in September 1833, at the age of eighty. He was buried at Lee-Oatman Cemetery in South Granville. He had composed his own epitaph, which was included on his gravestone as he had requested.

Here lies the dust of a poor hell-deserving sinner who ventured into eternity trusting wholly on the merits of Christ for salvation. In the full belief of the great doctrines he preached while on earth, he invites his children, and all who read this, to trust their eternal interest in the same foundation.

== Family ==
While living in Middle Granville in the early 1780s, Haynes met and married Elizabeth Babbitt (1763–1836), a white schoolteacher. Babbit was ten years younger than Haynes and had recently come to teach at the village school. She regularly listened to Haynes preach and, "looking to Heaven for guidance, she was led ... to make him the overture of her heart and hand as his companion for life." Although Haynes was "highly honored" by Babbit's proposal, he hesitated to accept, doing so only after consulting a number of ministers and receiving their approval. Their marriage was ultimately performed in Hartland, Connecticut, in 1783 by the Reverend Samuel Woodbridge. Their children included:

i. Elizabeth (b. November 1785 Granville, Mass., d. 6 Sep 1866 Rutland)

ii. Eunice (b. 3 March 1789 Rutland, d. 2 January 1859 Granville, New York)

iii. Louis (b. 1790 Rutland, d. 12 January 1828 Granville, New York)

iv. Electa (b. 26 July 1791 Rutland, d. after 1833 Granville, New York)

v. Lemuel, Jr. (b. 11 July 1794 Rutland, d. after 1850)

vi. Sarah (b. 6 May 1796 Rutland, d. August 1841 Granville, New York)

vii. Olive (b. 9 August 1798 Rutland, d. 19 September 1823 Middlebury)

viii. Pamela (b. 14 October 1800 Rutland)

ix. Samuel Woodbridge (b. 11 January 1803 Rutland, d. after 1 March 1885 Kansas)

x. William Babbitt (twin, b. 11 January 1803 Rutland, 3 March 1839 at sea)

== Legacy ==
Haynes was the first black abolitionist to reject slavery on purely theological grounds. His outspoken religious rhetoric surrounding 'slavery as a sin' was published in newspapers around the thirteen colonies. He was one of the first African American individuals to be published. Haynes's use of republican ideology and New Divinity theology in defense of liberty established Haynes as a founding father of Black Theology.

Middlebury College granted Haynes an honorary master of arts in 1804, the first honorary degree ever bestowed upon an African American.

Historian John Saillant (2003, p. 3) writes that Haynes's "faith and social views are better documented than those of any African American born before the luminaries of the mid-nineteenth century."

In February 2023, the West Hartford African American Social & Cultural Organization and the First Church of West Hartford unveiled the Lemuel Haynes Memorial –– one of the few physical tributes to him in his birthplace. The Lemuel Haynes House, Hayne's home in South Granville, New York when he was pastor of the South Granville Congregational Church, was declared a National Historic Landmark in 1975. In 2009, it was purchased from Charles Halderman by Bo Young and William Foote, formerly of Brooklyn.

== Collected works ==
- Haynes, Lemuel (1990). Newman, Richard (ed.). Black Preacher to White America: The Collected Writings of Lemuel Haynes, 1774-1833. Brooklyn, New York: Carlson Publishing, Inc. ISBN 0-926019-24-4.
- Haynes, Lemuel (2009). Anyabwile, Thabiti M. (ed.). May We Meet in the Heavenly World: The Piety of Lemuel Haynes. Grand Rapids, MI: Reformation Heritage Books. ISBN 9781601780652.
