= North Granville, New York =

- Hamlet and CDP
- Location within New York Location within the United States
- Coordinates: 43°27′01″N 73°20′29″W
- Country: United States
- State: New York
- County: Washington
- Elevation: 331 ft (101 m)
- Time zone: UTC-5 (Eastern (EST))
  - Summer (DST): UTC-4 (EDT)
- ZIP code: 12854
- Area codes: 518 & 838
- GNIS feature ID: 958792

North Granville is a hamlet (and census-designated place) in the Town of Granville, Washington County, New York, United States. As of the 2020 census, North Granville had a population of 524. The community is located along New York State Route 22, 5 miles (8.0 km) northwest of the village of Granville. North Granville has a post office with ZIP code 12854.
