= Town–Hollister Farm =

- U.S. National Register of Historic Places
- Location within New York Location within the United States
- Location: Rt. 22, North Granville
- Coordinates: 43.45013°N 73.34933°W
- Area: 330 acres (130 ha)
- Built: 1810
- NRHP reference No.: 08000516
- Added to NRHP: June 13, 2008

Town–Hollister Farm is a historic home and farm complex located on the western side of the hamlet of North Granville in Washington County, New York. The property is of both historical and architectural significance. The farm, encompassing 275 acres, includes a Federal-style farmhouse built around 1810 and multiple 19th and 20th-century agricultural-related structures which illustrate the agricultural activities of the farm and offer information on the vernacular design and timber framing practices of the region. The property was recommended to the New York State and National Historic Registries in 2007 and listed on the National Register of Historic Places in 2008.

== History ==
The property has been owned by only two families; the Towns and the Hollisters.

=== Salem Town Ownership ===
Salem Town (1779-1864) acquired the property, consisting then of approximately 50 acres, in the first decade of the 19th century. Town first came to North Granville in 1800 at the age of 21 after accepting a position as a district school teacher. After graduating from Middlebury College in Vermont in 1805, Town returned to North Granville to establish and serve as principal of the Fairvale Academy in North Granville, a teacher's training school for girls. It is believed he had the farmhouse built around 1810.

Town was prominent in Freemasonry and during his time in North Granville served as Master of the Granville Lodge No. 55 and Grand Chaplain. It was at the farm that he wrote his book System of Speculative Masonry. which he sought to mend the growing schism between the Ancient—Royal Arch Masons—and Modern-London Grand Lodge—Freemasons and which is still in print. Town additionally served the Granville community as supervisor from 1818-1819 and later served in the New York State Senate.

In 1822, Town left North Granville to accept a position at an academy in Powelton, Georgia, only to return to New York in 1829. When he returned to New York it was to the Cayuga Academy in Aurora, New York. There in 1830 he wrote his best-known educational text An Analysis of Derivative Words in the English Language, which is still in print and was employed in schools for half a century. After permanently settling in Aurora, Town sold the property to Captain Isaac Hollister (1766-1856) of Glastonbury, Connecticut in 1833.

=== Hollister Family Ownership ===
The son of Revolutionary War veteran Joseph Hollister, Issac Hollister had served as a captain in the Connecticut Militia until his discharge in 1803. Hollister was a farmer and house finisher or joiner. He purchased the property in 1833 and it has remained in the hands of Hollister descendants since that time. Under Hollister ownership in the 19th-century land was added and agricultural buildings and structures were constructed to expand the farming operation which continues, on more limited terms, to this day. The family have also augmented the agricultural production with cottage industries like tinsmithing and the production of sheepskin mittens and boots.

== Architectural Significance ==
The house was built about 1810 and is of the traditional two-story center entrance model popular in the early 19th century. It is of plank construction, consisting of a heavy timber frame superstructure with vertical planking in lieu of studding and nailers. Fireplaces were located in the two downstairs parlors and the kitchen with the upstairs chambers originally heated with stoves. The house maintains a number of period finishes reflecting the Neoclassic taste of the Early Republic era and in particular the Adam-inspired Federal style. It is believed that Isaac Hollister, a finisher and joiner by trade added some of the more interesting features of the house later including the east parlor mantel, with its three-part frieze with reeded panels; the entrance frontispiece; the Palladian window that lights the second floor hall; and the "boldy articulated exterior cornice" more consistent with the Greek Revival style of the 1830s. The current full-length front porch is believed to have been added in the 1890s and is consistent with the Late Victorian era's Eastlake and Italianate style.

The farm buildings are also of significance as they reflect the agricultural history of the property. The two-section barn and front section of the cow barn (current hay barn) are examples of mid 19th-century traditional post-and-beam construction with pegged hand-hewn and milled timbers and roofs of locally quarried slate. The hay barn is an example of English style barn construction with a flank entrance suggest it may have originally been utilized as a thrashing barn.
