= Lemuel Haynes House =

Historic house in New York, United States

- U.S. National Register of Historic Places
- U.S. National Historic Landmark
- Location within New York Location within the United States
- Location: County Road 27, South Granville, NY
- Coordinates: 43°22′15.88″N 73°17′0.13″W
- Area: 2 acres (0.81 ha)
- Built: 1793
- NRHP reference No.: 75001235

Significant dates
- Added to NRHP: May 15, 1975
- Designated NHL: May 15, 1975

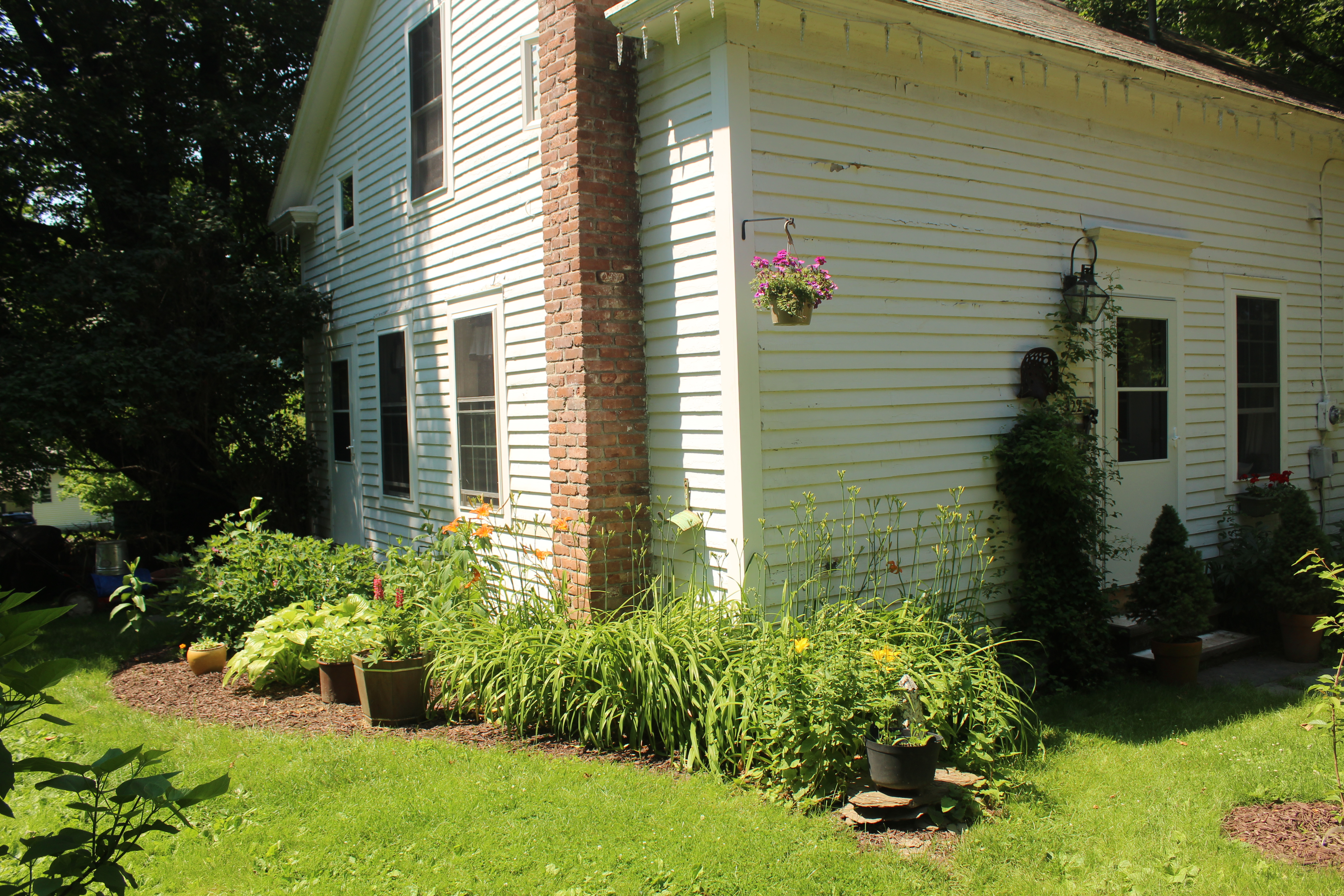

The Lemuel Haynes House is a historic house on County Road 27 in the village of South Granville, New York. Built in 1793, it was the home of Lemuel Haynes (1753-1833), the first African-American clergyman ordained in North America, from 1822 to 1833. It was designated a National Historic Landmark in 1975. The house was purchased from Charles Halderman as a private residence in 2009 by Bo Young and William J. Foote and is not normally open to the public.

== Description and history ==
The Lemuel Haynes House is located in the rural village of South Granville, on the south side of Washington County Route 27 a short distance east of its junction with New York State Route 149. It is a 1 1/2-story wood-frame structure, with a gabled roof, central chimney, and clapboarded exterior. It is oriented with its front facade facing east, perpendicular to the street. The main facade is five bays wide, with closely set pairs of sash windows on either side of the central entrance. The house is not architecturally distinguished, but does retain some period features, including wide floor boards and a large kitchen fireplace with a pot crane and a beehive oven. The house was built in 1793.

From 1822 until his death in 1833, the house was home to Lemuel Haynes. Born to a white woman and man of African descent, Haynes spent his early years in indentured servitude, but was educated by his master and introduced to the Congregational church. He served in the local (Granville, Massachusetts) militia during the American Revolutionary War, after his indenture ended, and was formally ordained as a Congregationalist minister in 1780. His service as minister to the Middle Granville church marks the first known instance of an African-American preacher leading a predominantly white congregation. Haynes spent many years leading a church in Rutland, Vermont, before ending his long career in Granville, New York.

== See also ==
- List of National Historic Landmarks in New York
- National Register of Historic Places listings in Washington County, New York
