= St. Mary's of the Mountain Church =

Historic church in New York, United States

- U.S. National Register of Historic Places
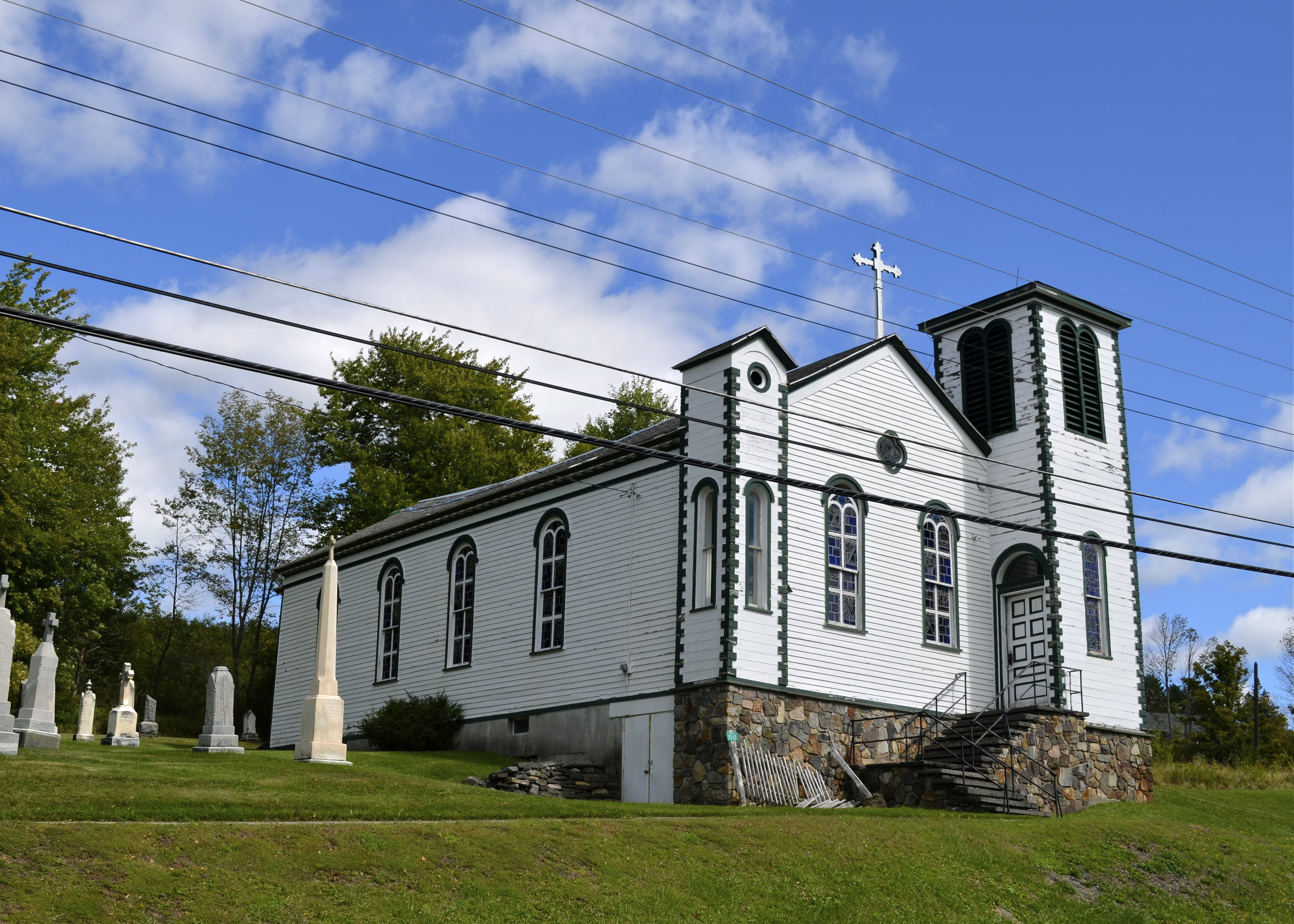
- Mary on the Mountain

- Location within New York Location within the United States
- Location: NY 23A, Hunter, New York
- Coordinates: 42°12′14″N 74°12′1″W
- Area: less than one acre
- Built: 1839
- Architectural style: Romanesque
- NRHP reference No.: 99000057
- Added to NRHP: January 27, 1999

St. Mary's of the Mountain Church was an historic Roman Catholic church on New York State Route 23A in Hunter, Greene County, New York. The church was completed in 1839 and is a one-story, four by two bay, post and beam frame structure on a modern concrete foundation. It features a moderately pitched gable roof, narrow clapboard sheathing, two engaged corner towers, and a Romanesque style engaged entry / bell tower. Also on the property is the parish cemetery.

It was added to the National Register of Historic Places in 1999.

It was razed on 04/12/2017.
