= Middle Granville, New York =

- Hamlet
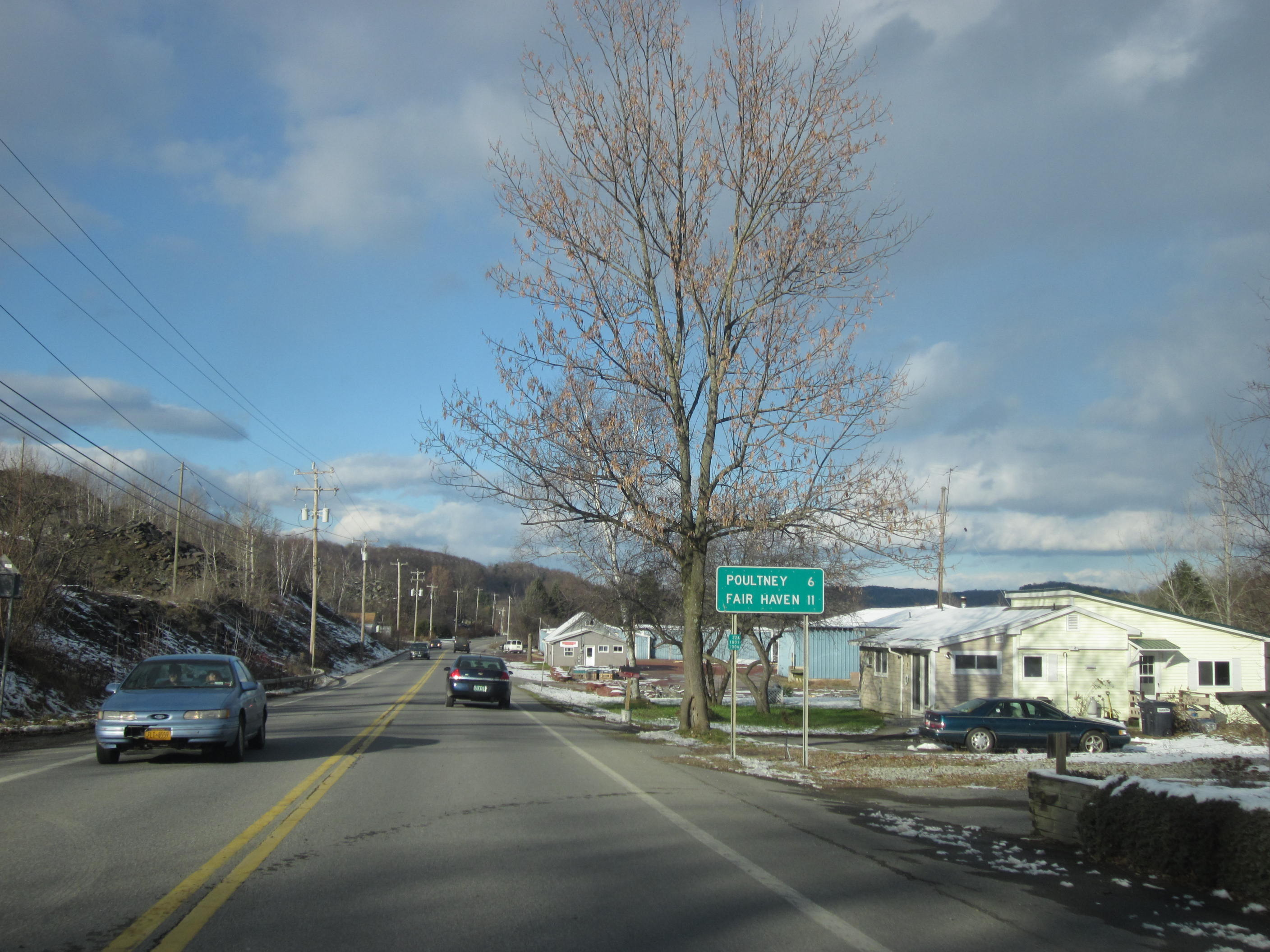
- Looking North in Middle Granville on NY state route 22A

- Location within New York Location within the United States
- Coordinates: 43°26′00″N 73°17′00″W
- Country: United States
- State: New York
- County: Washington
- Elevation: 371 ft (113 m)
- Time zone: UTC-5 (Eastern (EST))
  - Summer (DST): UTC-4 (EDT)
- ZIP code: 12849
- Area codes: 518 & 838
- GNIS feature ID: 957100

Middle Granville is a hamlet in Granville, Washington County, New York, United States. The community is located at the intersection of New York State Route 22 and New York State Route 22A 2.1 miles (3.4 km) northwest of the village of Granville. Middle Granville has a post office with ZIP code 12849.
