= Poultney River =

River in southwestern Vermont and eastern New York

Coordinates: 43°37′35.24″N 73°20′36.41″W

The Poultney River is a river in southwestern Vermont and eastern New York. In its 40-mile long course, the river drains approximately 263 square miles as it flows northwards into the southern end of Lake Champlain.

== Course ==
The Poultney River's origin is from a mountain spring in the town of Tinmouth, VT. From here, it flows through the towns of Middletown Springs and Poultney, after which it begins to form the Vermont–New York border, beginning at the Poultney (VT)/Hampton (NY) town lines. Along this border, the river travels through the towns of Fair Haven, VT; West Haven, VT; and Whitehall, NY. On the West Haven/Whitehall border, the river enters Lake Champlain.

== Tributaries ==
For most of its course, the Poultney River is fed by a series of small brooks. It is not until it approaches the towns of Fair Haven and West Haven that more substantial waterbodies feed into the river. In Fair Haven, the Castleton River has its confluence with the Poultney. Approximately five miles downstream, the Hubbardton River also flows into the Poultney.

== History ==
=== Revolutionary War ===
In 1901, a civil engineer constructing a hydroelectric dam on the river discovered the hull of a Revolutionary War–era vessel, just below Carver's Falls. After temporarily diverting the river, his crew excavated the ship, discovering within it an iron chest containing English gold sovereigns.

=== War of 1812 ===
In addition to the sunken Revolutionary War era sloop, there have been several other historical vessels that found their way to the bottom of the Poultney River. At the end of the War of 1812, a combination of US Navy and captured British Navy ships which had survived the Battle of Plattsburgh were placed in Whitehall, NY, out of service. After several years of disuse, their condition had deteriorated so much that, in 1820, they were floated into the Poultney River, where they were allowed to sink. In 1825, many of the ships were sold, though already sunken, to salvagers. The largest of these ships were the frigate HMS Confiance, the schooner USS Ticonderoga, the brig Eagle, the brig HMS Linnet, and the USS Saratoga. Of these ships, the Ticonderoga, Eagle, and Linnet have been the target of archaeological study and excavation attempts. The Ticonderoga was excavated with great success in 1958 and its remains were stored in the Skenesborough Museum in Whitehall. The Eagle, left relatively intact, was surveyed by marine archaeologists in 1983 in such detail that they were able to reconstruct it in its entirety. The Linnet, however, had been partially pulled out of the river in 1949 by local residents. In the process, the hull split in half and what was not brought ashore disappeared downstream, only to be rediscovered and surveyed by archaeologists in 1981. Due to the deteriorated nature of this wreck, only partial drawings and reconstructions of the Linnet were possible. It remains in the river to this day.

== See also ==
- List of rivers of Vermont
