= Granville (village), New York =

Granville
- Village
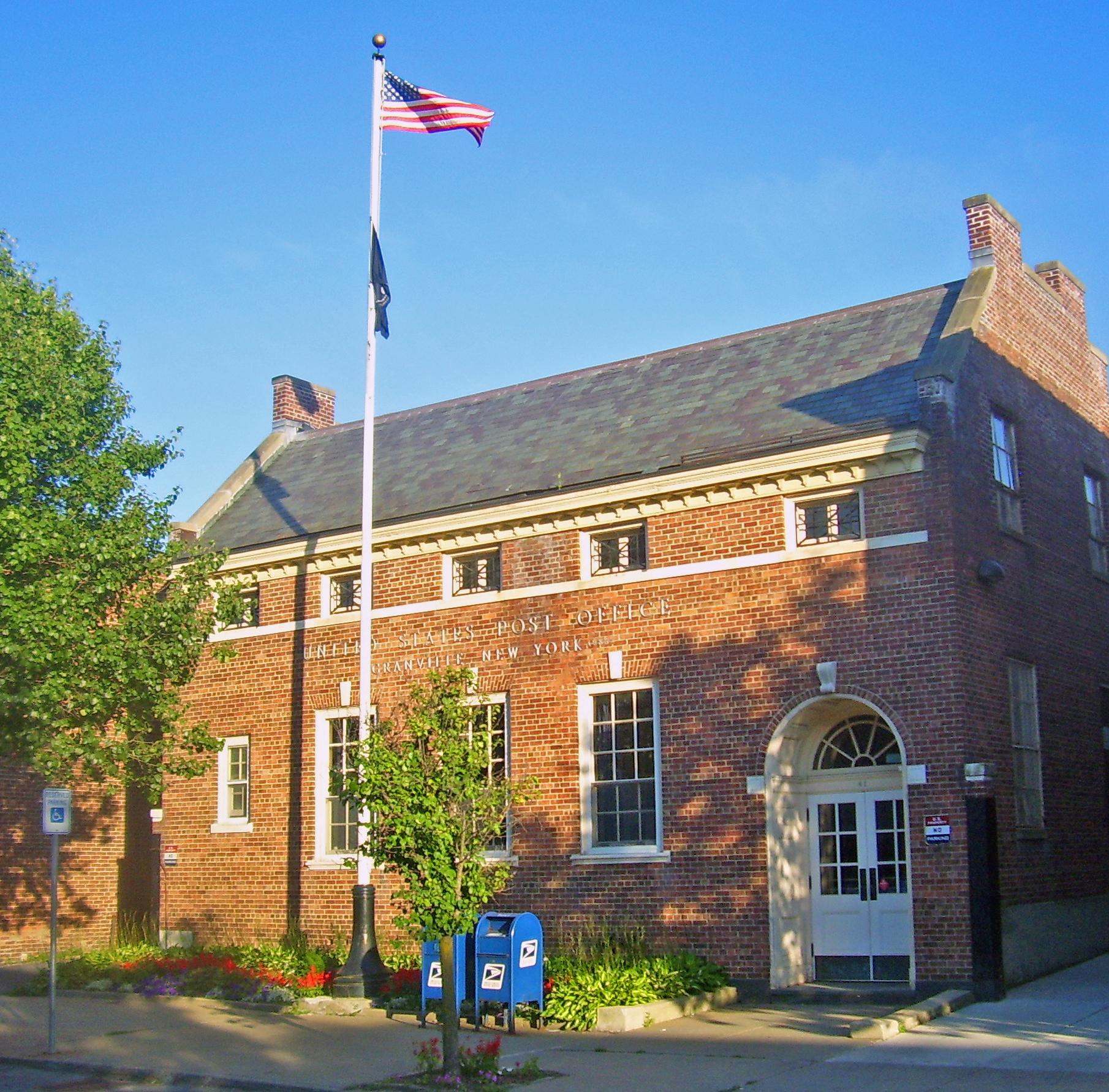
- Granville Post Office

- Location in Washington County and the state of New York.
- Coordinates: 43°24′21″N 73°15′53″W
- Country: United States
- State: New York
- County: Washington

Area
  - Total: 1.55 sq mi (4.01 km^{2})
  - Land: 1.55 sq mi (4.01 km^{2})
  - Water: 0 sq mi (0.00 km^{2})
- Elevation: 410 ft (125 m)

Population (2020)
  - Total: 2,404
  - Density: 1,551.7/sq mi (599.12/km^{2})
- Time zone: UTC-5 (Eastern (EST))
  - Summer (DST): UTC-4 (EDT)
- ZIP code: 12832
- Area code: 518
- FIPS code: 36-30026
- GNIS feature ID: 0951525

Granville is a village in Washington County, New York, United States. It is part of the Glens Falls Metropolitan Statistical Area. The village population was 2,543 at the 2010 census.

The Village of Granville is in the eastern part of the Town of Granville at Routes NY-149 and NY-22.

== History ==
Many early settlers arrived from the New England area, and jurisdiction was claimed by both Vermont and New York.

The first known settler was a merchant named Bishop, who opened the first store in 1780. Slate deposits were located around 1850 in the town, and the slate business spread to Granville village by 1871.

The United States Post Office was listed on the National Register of Historic Places in 1989.

== Geography ==
According to the United States Census Bureau, the village has a total area of 1.6 square miles (4.1 km^{2}), all land.

The village is at the border of Vermont.

There are two rivers that meet in Granville: The Indian and the Mettowee (also known as Pawlet). NY Route 22 runs along the west side of the village and joins NY Route 149 south of the village. NY-149 passes through the village as Main Street and becomes Vermont Route 149 at the eastern side of the village. County Road 24 from the northwest.

== The Welsh Connection ==
Granville's Welsh connection began in the 1860s when Welsh miners from Blaenau Ffestiniog and Bethesda found their way into the area; many leaving their wives and families behind to send for them later. From then on, steady streams of Welsh immigrants settled the area and Granville gradually grew into a prominent Welsh American community. The ethnic enclave reached its peak in 1910 when of the town's 3,920 residents, 949 were Welsh born and another 847 were American born to Welsh parents, combined accounting for 45.8% of the town's population. Welsh placenames and chapels still exist e.g. "Brynhyfryd" and Peniel Chapel. The Welsh folk song "Molianwn" originated there and refers to the closing down of the quarries over the cold winter period.

== Demographics ==
Historical population
| Census | Pop. | Note | %± |
|---|---|---|---|
| 1880 | 1,071 | | — |
| 1900 | 2,700 | | — |
| 1910 | 3,920 | | 45.2% |
| 1920 | 3,024 | | −22.9% |
| 1930 | 3,483 | | 15.2% |
| 1940 | 3,173 | | −8.9% |
| 1950 | 2,826 | | −10.9% |
| 1960 | 2,715 | | −3.9% |
| 1970 | 2,784 | | 2.5% |
| 1980 | 2,696 | | −3.2% |
| 1990 | 2,646 | | −1.9% |
| 2000 | 2,644 | | −0.1% |
| 2010 | 2,543 | | −3.8% |
| 2020 | 2,404 | | −5.5% |
U.S. Decennial Census

As of the census of 2000, there were 2,644 people, 1,024 households, and 630 families residing in the village. The population density was 1,668.5 inhabitants per square mile (644.2/km^{2}). There were 1,130 housing units at an average density of 713.1 per square mile (275.3/km^{2}). The racial makeup of the village was 98.07% White, 0.23% Black or African American, 0.23% Native American, 0.26% Asian, 0.04% Pacific Islander, 0.42% from other races, and 0.76% from two or more races. Hispanic or Latino of any race were 0.79% of the population.

There were 1,024 households, out of which 32.0% had children under the age of 18 living with them, 43.1% were married couples living together, 14.1% had a female householder with no husband present, and 38.4% were non-families. 33.0% of all households were made up of individuals, and 17.4% had someone living alone who was 65 years of age or older. The average household size was 2.41 and the average family size was 3.04.

In the village, the population was spread out, with 25.7% under the age of 18, 8.2% from 18 to 24, 25.0% from 25 to 44, 19.4% from 45 to 64, and 21.7% who were 65 years of age or older. The median age was 37 years. For every 100 females, there were 86.9 males. For every 100 females age 18 and over, there were 79.3 males.

The median income for a household in the village was $29,709, and the median income for a family was $38,444. Males had a median income of $28,221 versus $20,488 for females. The per capita income for the village was $15,424. About 11.6% of families and 17.2% of the population were below the poverty line, including 18.6% of those under age 18 and 10.9% of those age 65 or over.

== Notable people ==
- Mary Ann Day Brown (1816–1884), wife of John Brown the abolitionist
- Alanson Holly, Wisconsin state legislator and newspaper editor
- John M. Parker (New York politician), former US Congressman
- Allen R. Sturtevant, Associate Justice of the Vermont Supreme Court
