= Hampton, New York =

Hampton
- Town
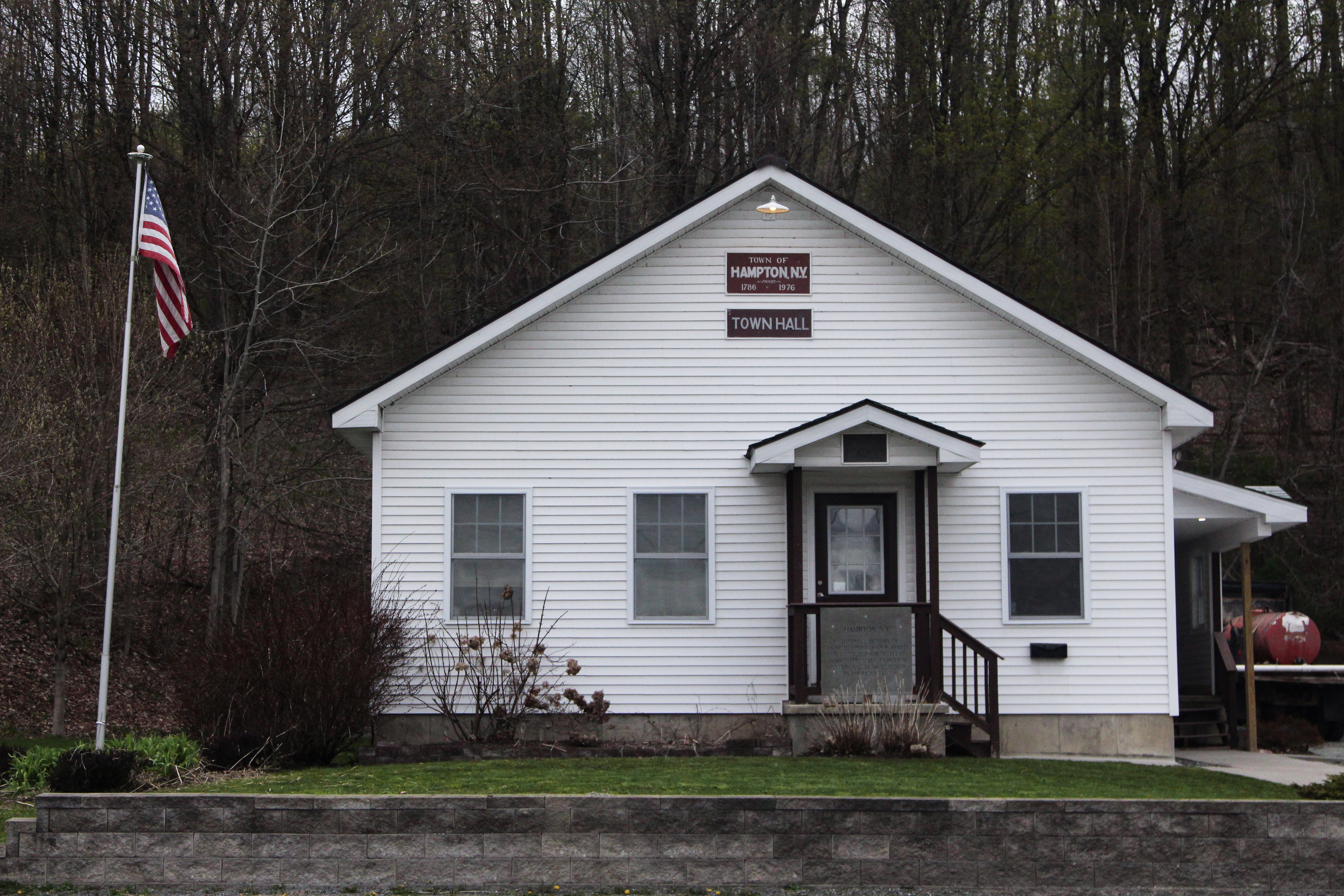
- Town hall

- Location in Washington County and the state of New York.
- Coordinates: 43°33′N 73°18′W
- Country: United States
- State: New York
- County: Washington

Area
  - Total: 22.59 sq mi (58.51 km^{2})
  - Land: 22.24 sq mi (57.61 km^{2})
  - Water: 0.35 sq mi (0.90 km^{2})
- Elevation: 633 ft (193 m)

Population (2010)
  - Total: 938
  - Estimate (2016): 922
  - Density: 41.5/sq mi (16.01/km^{2})
- Time zone: UTC-5 (Eastern (EST))
  - Summer (DST): UTC-4 (EDT)
- ZIP code(s): 12837 (primary); 12887 Whitehall
- Area code: 518
- FIPS code: 36-31885
- GNIS feature ID: 0979041
- Website: hamptonny.gov

Hampton is a town in Washington County, New York, United States. It is part of the Glens Falls Metropolitan Statistical Area. The town population was 938 at the 2010 census, an increase of 7.2% since the 2000 census. The town of Hampton is located in the northeastern corner of Washington County.

== History ==
This area of New York was part of a jurisdictional dispute between New York and Vermont. The matter was not settled until after 1790.

The town was formed in 1786 and was once called "Hampton Corners" and "Greenfield." It was founded by former American Revolutionary War officer Gideon G. Warren. The first town meeting was conducted in his home. Many of the first settlers were from Massachusetts and Connecticut. The land contains parts of early land patents, including Skene's Little Patent and those issued to groups of British officers.

In 1783, the Poultney River at the eastern town line suddenly changed course and became unnavigable due to a sudden influx of water.

Red slate and other colored slates were mined here.

The William Miller Chapel and Ascension Rock was listed on the National Register of Historic Places in 1975.

== Notable people ==
- James Rood Doolittle (January 3, 1815 – July 27, 1897), U.S. Senator from Wisconsin from March 4, 1857, to March 4, 1869
- William Miller (1782–1849), American Baptist preacher who is credited with beginning the mid-nineteenth century North American religious movement now known as Adventism
- Nelson R. Norton, later a member of the Wisconsin State Assembly.
- George W. Weeden, later a member of the Wisconsin State Assembly.

== Geography ==
According to the United States Census Bureau, the town has a total area of 22.6 square miles (59 km^{2}), of which, 22.6 square miles (59 km^{2}) of it is land and 0.1 square miles (0.26 km^{2}) of it (0.35%) is water.

The eastern part of the town forms a border with Vermont. Part of the boundary is marked by the Poultney River, which flows into Lake Champlain.

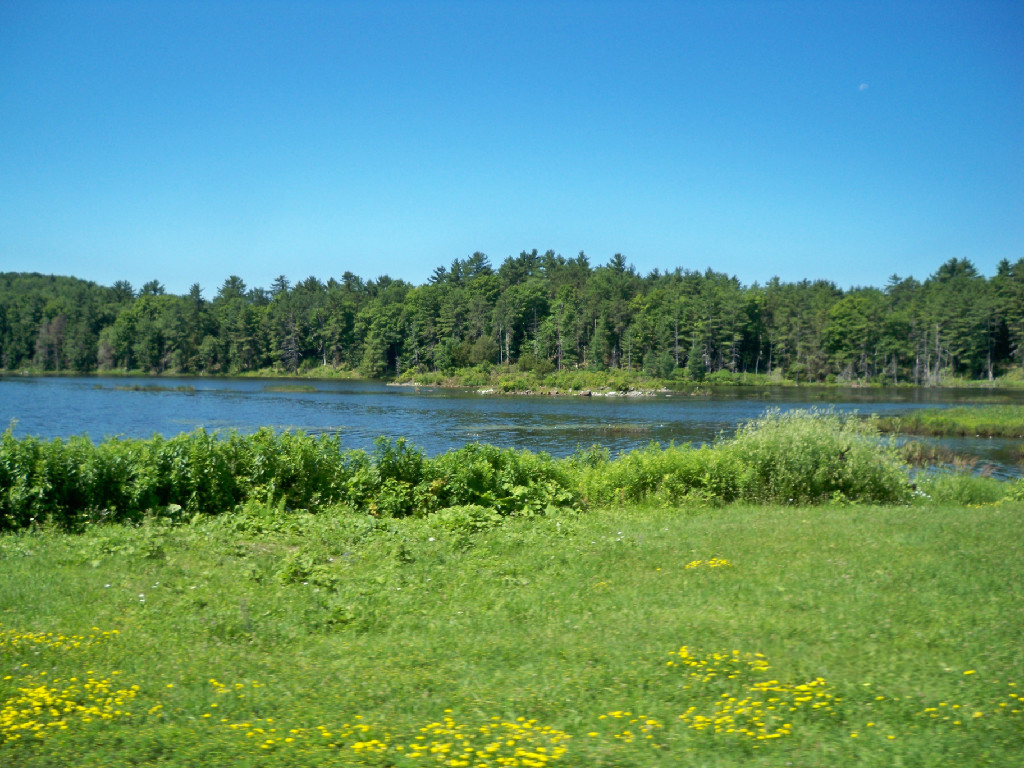
Image taken of a pond that is located in Hampton, New York

US 4 cross the town in an east–west direction. NY 22A passes along the east side of the town.

== Demographics ==
Historical population
Census	Pop.	Note	%±
1820	963		—
1830	1,069		11.0%
1840	972		−9.1%
1850	899		−7.5%
1860	876		−2.6%
1870	955		9.0%
1880	833		−12.8%
1890	791		−5.0%
1900	689		−12.9%
1910	645		−6.4%
1920	552		−14.4%
1930	673		21.9%
1940	594		−11.7%
1950	576		−3.0%
1960	469		−18.6%
1970	464		−1.1%
1980	559		20.5%
1990	756		35.2%
2000	871		15.2%
2010	938		7.7%
2016 (est.)	922		−1.7%
U.S. Decennial Census

As of the census of 2010, there were 938 people, 326 households, and 228 families residing in the town. The population density was 38.6 inhabitants per square mile (14.9/km^{2}). There were 435 housing units at an average density of 19.3 units per square mile (7.5 units/km^{2}). The racial makeup of the town was 98.5% White, 0.6% African American, 0.1% Native American, 0.1% Asian, and 0.7% from two or more races. Hispanic or Latino of any race were 1.0% of the population.

There were 326 households, out of which 38.0% had children under the age of 18 living with them, 58.0% were married couples living together, 7.7% had a female householder with no husband present, and 30.1% were non-families. 20.6% of all households were made up of individuals, and 5.8% had someone living alone who was 65 years of age or older. The average household size was 2.65 and the average family size was 3.10.

In the town, the population was spread out, with 27.6% under the age of 18, 7.0% from 18 to 24, 29.3% from 25 to 44, 27.1% from 45 to 64, and 9.1% who were 65 years of age or older. The median age was 36 years. For every 100 females, there were 98.4 males. For every 100 females age 18 and over, there were 106.9 males.

The median income for a household in the town was $39,444, and the median income for a family was $46,250. Males had a median income of $29,107 versus $23,750 for females. The per capita income for the town was $17,433. About 3.8% of families and 7.1% of the population were below the poverty line, including 10.3% of those under age 18 and none of those age 65 or over.

== Communities and locations in Hampton ==
=== Communities ===
- Hampton – A hamlet in the southeastern part of the town on NY 22A near the Vermont border.
- Hampton Corners – An historic community, once located ten miles north of Hampton hamlet.
- Hampton Flats – A location north of Hampton hamlet on NY 22A.
- Low Hampton – A hamlet on US 4 in the northeastern part of the town at the Vermont border.

=== Geographical locations ===
- Crystal Lake – A small lake southwest of Hampton hamlet.
- Hills Pond – A lake west of Crystal Lake.
- Mirror Lake – A small lake in County Route 21.
- Reflection Lake – A small lake near Mirror Lake on County Route 21.
