= Granville, New York =

Granville
- Town
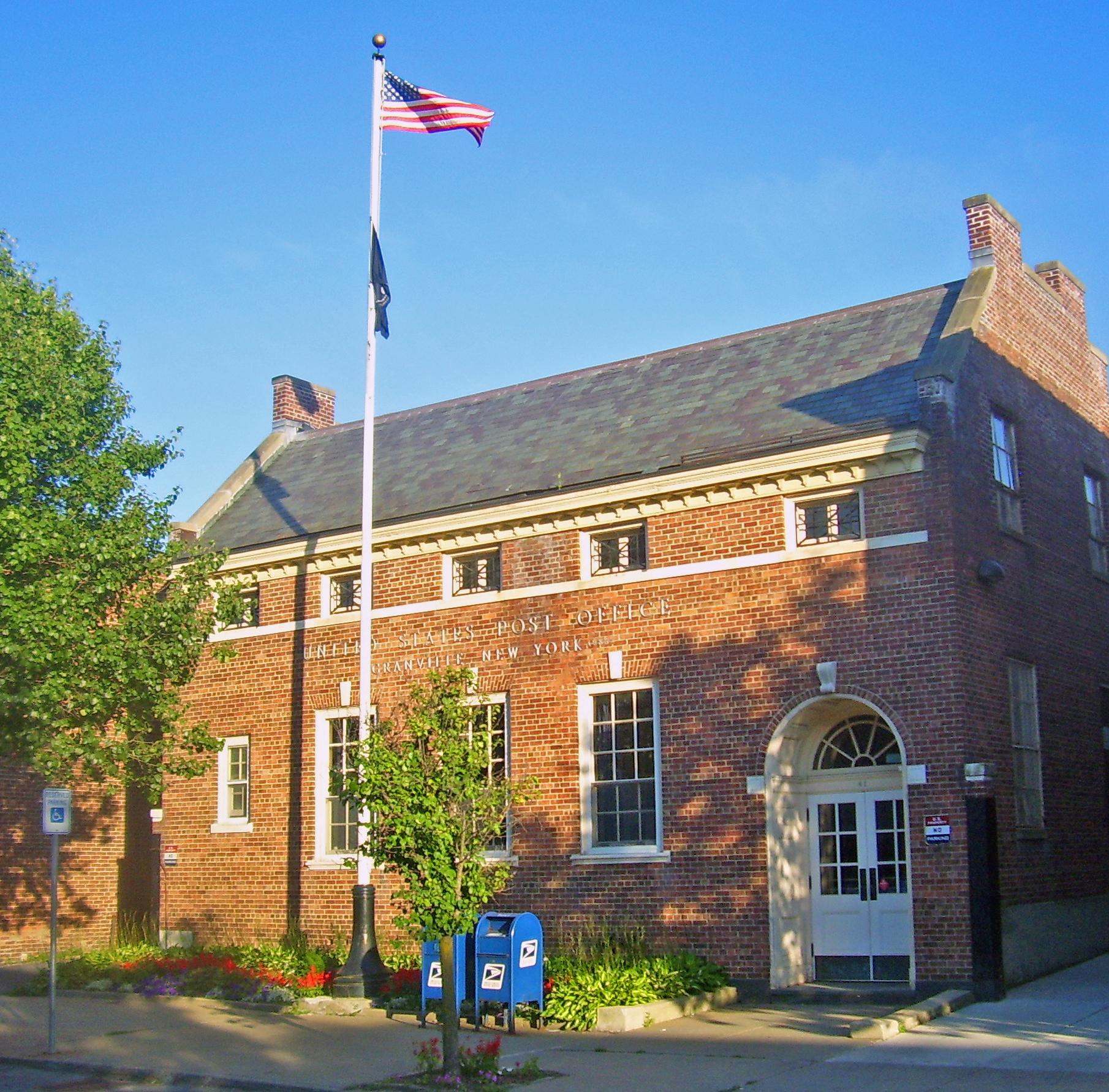
- Granville Post Office

- Location in Washington County and the state of New York.
- Coordinates: 43°25′20″N 73°18′20″W
- Country: United States
- State: New York
- County: Washington

Government
  - Mayor: Paul Labas

Area
  - Total: 56.12 sq mi (145.35 km^{2})
  - Land: 55.62 sq mi (144.05 km^{2})
  - Water: 0.50 sq mi (1.30 km^{2})
- Elevation: 653 ft (199 m)

Population (2020)
  - Total: 6,215
  - Density: 111.7/sq mi (43.1/km^{2})
- Time zone: UTC-5 (Eastern (EST))
  - Summer (DST): UTC-4 (EDT)
- ZIP codes: 12832 (primary): 12821 Comstock; 12837 Hampton; 12849 Middle Granville; 12887 Whitehall
- Area code: 518
- FIPS code: 36-30037
- GNIS feature ID: 0979014
- Website: https://www.townofgranvilleny.gov/

Granville is a town on the eastern border of Washington County, New York, United States, abutting Rutland County, Vermont. It is part of the Glens Falls Metropolitan Statistical Area. The town population was 6,215 at the 2020 census.

The town of Granville contains a village that also bears the name Granville. Granville is named for John Carteret, 2nd Earl Granville.

Granville has been called the "Colored Slate Capital of the World." Quarries in the town mine slate that comes in colors such as green, gray, gray black, purple, mottled green and purple, and red. Walter Granville-Smith was born in Granville.

Granville Avenue and the associated CTA station in Chicago are named after the town, as was the former Town of Granville, Wisconsin.

== History ==
From evidence discovered circa 1850, the St. Francis Native Americans appear to have used the town for hunting and making tools in the past.

Perspective map of Granville with list of landmarks from 1886 by L.R. Burleigh

This border area between Vermont and New York was, for a long period, not clearly under control of either state. Arrivals from New England settled here, hoping to gain the benefits of New England in areas such as land ownership and voting rights. Early settlers arrived before 1770, but the state line was not established until 1790, leaving settlers in this town within New York State.

The town was founded in 1780.

Early agricultural efforts included dairy herds and sheep raising.

Extensive slate deposits were located in 1846 in nearby Fair Haven, and in 1850 more slate deposits were found in Middle Granville. The first Granville slate quarries opened around 1853. The first slate deposits had been located in 1839 and were used for local construction.

== Geography ==
The eastern town line is the border of Vermont (Rutland County).

According to the United States Census Bureau, the town has a total area of 56.1 square miles (145.4 km^{2}), of which 56.1 square miles (145.2 km^{2}) is land and 0.04 square mile (0.1 km^{2}) (0.05%) is water.

NY 22A diverges from NY 22 by Middle Granville. NY 149 joins NY 22 south of Granville village.

The Mettawee River and the Indian River are two large streams in the town.

== Demographics ==
Historical population
Census	Pop.	Note	%±
1820	3,727		—
1830	3,882		4.2%
1840	3,846		−0.9%
1850	3,434		−10.7%
1860	3,474		1.2%
1870	4,063		17.0%
1880	4,149		2.1%
1890	4,716		13.7%
1900	5,217		10.6%
1910	6,434		23.3%
1920	4,966		−22.8%
1930	5,806		16.9%
1940	5,508		−5.1%
1950	5,116		−7.1%
1960	5,015		−2.0%
1970	5,412		7.9%
1980	5,566		2.8%
1990	5,935		6.6%
2000	6,456		8.8%
2010	6,669		3.3%
2020	6,215		−6.8%
2021 (est.)	6,175	▼	−0.6%
U.S. Decennial Census

As of the census of 2020, there were 6,215 people and 2,790 households residing in the town. The population density was 111.7 inhabitants per square mile (43.1/km^{2}). In the year 2000, there were 2,635 housing units at an average density of 47.0 per square mile (18.1/km^{2}). The racial makeup of the town in 2020 was 97.1% White, 0.1% Black or African American, 0.7% American Indian and Alaska Native, 0.5% Asian, 0.0% Native Hawaiian and Other Pacific Islander and 1.6% from two or more races. Hispanic or Latino of any race were 0.5% of the population.

There were 2,790 households in 2020, with an average household size of 2.27.

In the town, 20.6% were under the age of 18 and 4.3% were under the age of 5 in 2020. Persons 65 years and older made up 22.4% of the population. The percent of the population that was female was 52.9%.

The median income for a household in the town was $46,824 in 2020 dollars. The per capita income for the town was $26,396. About 10.2% of the population were below the poverty line.

== Communities and locations ==
- Granville – A village located on NY 149 by the Vermont border.
- Granville Airport (B01) – Located one mile north of Granville village, this facility consists of one asphalt runway.
- Guilder Hollow—The now-extinct hamlet was named for the van Guilder family who resided there. A. H. Estabrook and Charles Davenport's "The Nam Family: A Cacogenic Family of New York State" (1912) provides a pseudo-scientific ethnography of the family. The study gave pseudo-scientific support for eugenics, which linked feeblemindedness, criminality and a host of other failings to genetics, and proposed to improve society by limiting the reproductive rights of "defective" families.
- Hillsdale – A hamlet in the southern part of the town on NY 149.
- Lee District - A hamlet along Lee Road, centered by Schoolhouse No. 2.
- Martins Pond – The largest of several ponds located south of Slyboro.
- Middle Granville – A hamlet northeast of Granville village, located on NY 22A. The Dayton-Williams House was listed on the National Register of Historic Places in 2006.
- North Granville – A hamlet on NY 22 in the northwestern part of Granville. The Town-Hollister Farm was listed on the National Register of Historic Places in 2008.
- Raceville – A hamlet in the northeastern part of the town, located on NY 22A.
- Hicks Orchard – A hamlet west of the Granville village, located on County Route 23.
- South Granville – A hamlet on NY 149 in the southeastern part of the town. The South Granville Congregational Church was listed on the National Register of Historic Places in 2005. The Lemuel Haynes House is listed as a National Historic Landmark.
- Truthville – A hamlet just east of North Granville.
- West Granville – A hamlet on NY 40 at County Route 17 by the western town line.
- West Pawlet – A community on the border of Vermont in the southeastern corner of Granville at the end of County Route 29.

== Education ==
- Mary J. Tanner School – Educates Kindergarten through 2nd grade level students.
- Granville Elementary School – Educates 3rd through 6th grade level students.
- Granville High School – Educates students in 7th through 12th grade, including high school students.
- Truthville Christian Academy - Educates prekindergarten through 12th grade students.

== Sports ==
In 1951 Mettowee Speedway, a dirt oval racing facility, was opened near the hamlet of North Granville, New York. It operated through 1953, and was the underpinning of track champion Steve Danish claiming the 1953 NASCAR New York Sportsman crown. (Note: Geolocation of Mettowee Speedway: 43.4485°N 73.3326°W)

== Notable residents ==
- Mary Ann Day Brown (1816-1884), wife of the abolitionist John Brown
- Lemuel Haynes (1753-1833), clergyman
- Benjamin F. Hopkins (1829-1870), American politician and telegraph operator
