= List of covered bridges in New York =

This is a list of covered bridges in New York State.

The New York State Office of Parks, Recreation and Historic Preservation identifies 29 covered bridges in New York State as historic, but these are not all listed on the National Register of Historic Places. The New York Society of Covered Bridges lists 24 historic covered bridges.

One of the NRHPs, Old Blenheim Bridge, has further been declared to be a National Historic Landmark and also has described by a Historic American Engineering Record. It may be the longest single-span covered bridge in the United States or in the world.

== 24 identified by New York Society of Covered Bridges ==
(ordered by counties):

The following is a list of 24 of the historic New York State covered bridges.

Name	Image	Location^{[A]}	Year built	Length (ft)	Spans	Design and Historical Notes^{[B]}
Downsville Bridge		Delaware County	1854	174	East Branch of the Delaware River	Listed on the National Register of Historic Places in 1999.
Fitches Bridge		Delaware County	1870	100	West Branch of the Delaware River	Listed on the National Register of Historic Places in 1999.
Hamden Bridge		Delaware County	1859	125	West Branch of the Delaware River	Listed on the National Register of Historic Places in 1999.
Lower Shavertown Bridge, or Campbell Bridge or Old Roscoe Bridge		Delaware County	1877	32	Trout Creek	Listed on the National Register of Historic Places in 1999.
Tuscarora Club Bridge		Delaware County	1870, rebuilt 2012	38	Mill Brook	
Jay Bridge		Essex County	1857	160	Ausable River	
Salisbury Center Bridge		Herkimer County	1875	50	Spruce Creek	Listed on the National Register of Historic Places in 1972.
Hyde Hall Bridge		Otsego County	1825	53	Shadow Brook	Listed on the National Register of Historic Places in 1998. Located in Glimmerglass State Park.
Copeland Bridge		Saratoga County	1879	35	Beecher Creek	Listed on the National Register of Historic Places in 1998.
Blenheim Bridge		Schoharie County	1855, rebuilt 2018	232	Schoharie Creek	Listed on the National Register of Historic Places in 1966 and National Historic Landmark in 1964. Destroyed on August 28, 2011, by Tropical Storm Irene.
Beaverkill Bridge, also known as Conklin Bridge		Sullivan County	1865	98	Beaver Kill	Listed on the National Register of Historic Places in 2007.
Bendo Bridge, or Willowemoc Covered Bridge		Sullivan County	1860	48	Willowemoc Creek	
Halls Mills Bridge		Sullivan County	1912	119	Neversink River	
Van Tran Flat Bridge, formerly called the Mott's Flat Bridge and also known as the Livingston Manor Bridge		Sullivan County	1860	117	Willowemoc Creek	
Newfield Bridge		Tompkins County	1853	115	Cayuga Creek	Listed on the National Register of Historic Places in 2000.
Ashokan Bridge, or New Paltz Campus Bridge or Turnwood Bridge		Ulster County	1889	62	Esopus Creek	Listed on the National Register of Historic Places in 2000.
Forge Bridge		Ulster County	1906	27	Dry Brook	
Grants Mills Bridge		Ulster County	1902	66	Mill Brook	Listed on the National Register of Historic Places in 1999.
Perrine's Bridge		Ulster County	1844	138	Wallkill River	Listed on the National Register of Historic Places in 1973.
Tappan Bridge, or Kittle Bridge		Ulster County	1906	43	Dry Brook	
Buskirk Bridge		Washington County	1857	164	Hoosic River	Listed on the National Register of Historic Places in 1978.
Eagleville Bridge		Washington County	1858	101	Battenkill	Listed on the National Register of Historic Places in 1978.
Rexleigh Bridge		Washington County	1874	107	Battenkill	Listed on the National Register of Historic Places in 1978.
Shushan Bridge		Washington County	1858	161	Battenkill	Listed on the National Register of Historic Places in 1978.

== 18 identified by Peter Folk ==
More modern or otherwise not-as-authentic covered bridges in New York State also exist. Peter Folk lists the following 18 bridges:

- Waldbillig Bridge, in Albany County
- Voorheesville School Bridge, in Albany County
- Munson Bridge in Broome County
- Thomas E. Kelly Bridge in Cattaraugus County
- Erpf Bridge in Delaware County
- Fort Ticonderoga / Kissing Bridge, in Essex County
- Morehouse Bridge in Fulton County
- Old Forge Bridge in Herkimer County
- Frontenac or North Country Bridge, in Jefferson County
- Americana Village Bridge, in Madison County
- Roydhouse Bridge, in Oneida County, 42°53′43.74″N 75°18′2.45″W
- Schoharie Bridge, in Schoharie County
- Ludlow Greens Bridge, in Suffolk County 40°56.55′N 72°17.47′W
- Grahamsville Bridge, in Sullivan County
- Friendship Manor Bridge, in Ulster County
- Myers Bridge, in Ulster County
- Cambridge Bridge, in Washington County
- Granville Bridge, in Washington County
- Cannon Covered Bridge, in Wyoming County
