= Wing wall =

Smaller wall near a larger wall or structure

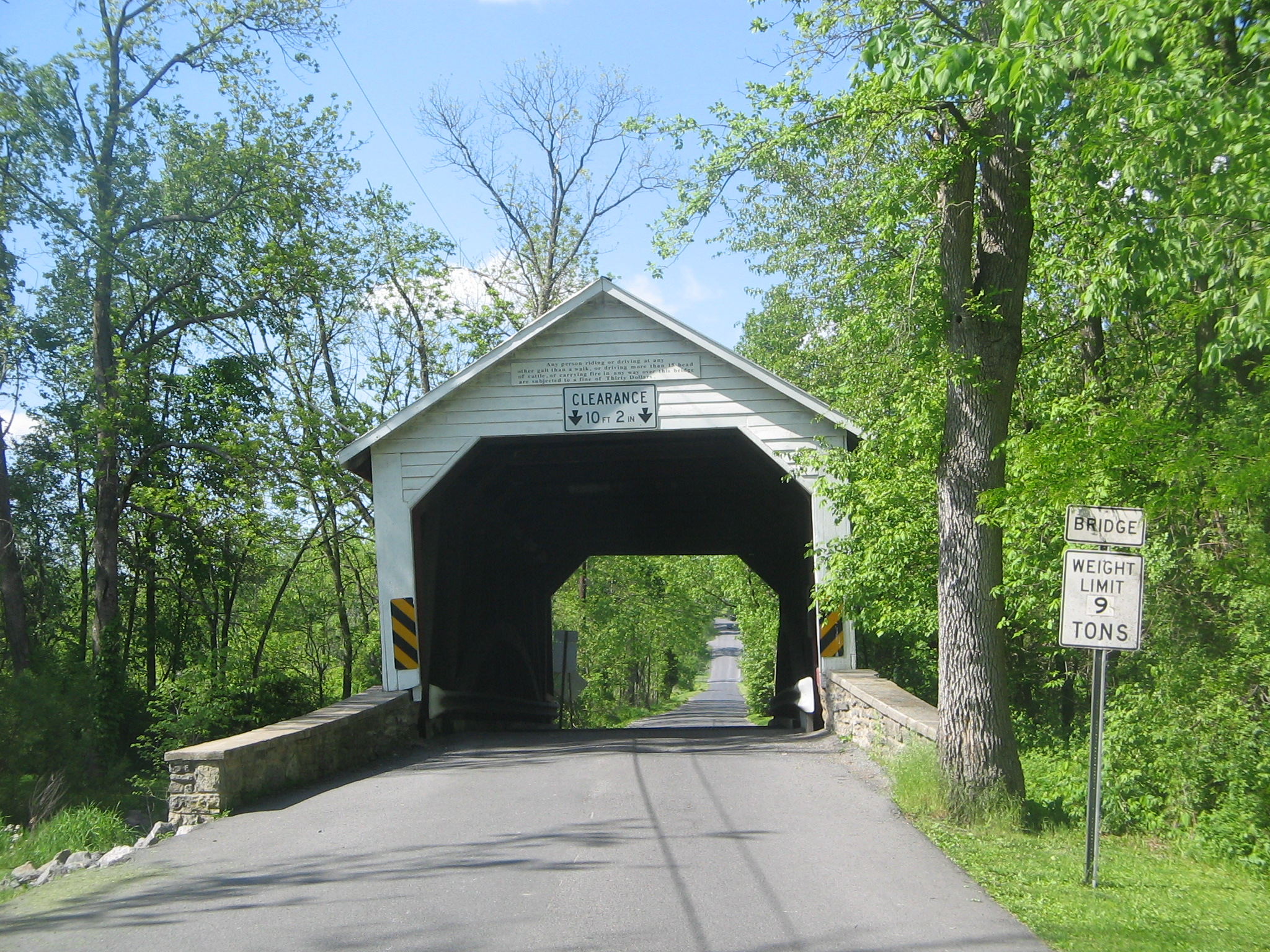
The entrance to Hassenplug Covered Bridge in Mifflinburg, Pennsylvania is flanked by wing walls.

A wing wall (also "wingwall" or "wing-wall") is a smaller wall attached or next to a larger wall or structure.

== Bridges ==
In a bridge, the wing walls are adjacent to the abutments and act as retaining walls. They are generally constructed of the same material as those of abutments. The wing walls can either be attached to the abutment or be independent of it. Wing walls are provided at both ends of the abutments to retain the earth filling of the approaches. Their design depends upon the nature of the embankment and does not depend upon the type or parts of the bridge.

The soil and fill supporting the roadway and approach embankment are retained by the wing walls, which can be at a right angle to the abutment or splayed at different angles. The wing walls are generally constructed at the same time and of the same materials as the abutments.

== Classification of wing walls ==
Wing walls can be classified according to their position in plan with respect to banks and abutments. The classification is as follows:

1. Straight wing walls: used for small bridges, on drains with low banks and for railway bridges in cities (weep holes are provided).
2. Splayed wing walls: used for bridges across rivers. They provide smooth entry and exit to the water. The splay is usually 45°. Their top width is 0.5 m, face batter 1 in 12 and back batter 1 in 6, weep holes are provided.
3. Return wing walls: used where banks are high and hard or firm. Their top width is 1.5 m and face is vertical and back battered 1 in 4. Scour can be a problem for wing walls and abutments both, as the water in the stream erodes the supporting soil.

== Other uses ==
Wing walls provide smooth entry of water into the bridge site and provide support and protect the embankment. Wing walls can serve as buttresses to support walls. They can also be purely decorative.
