= Shadow Brook =

River in New York State

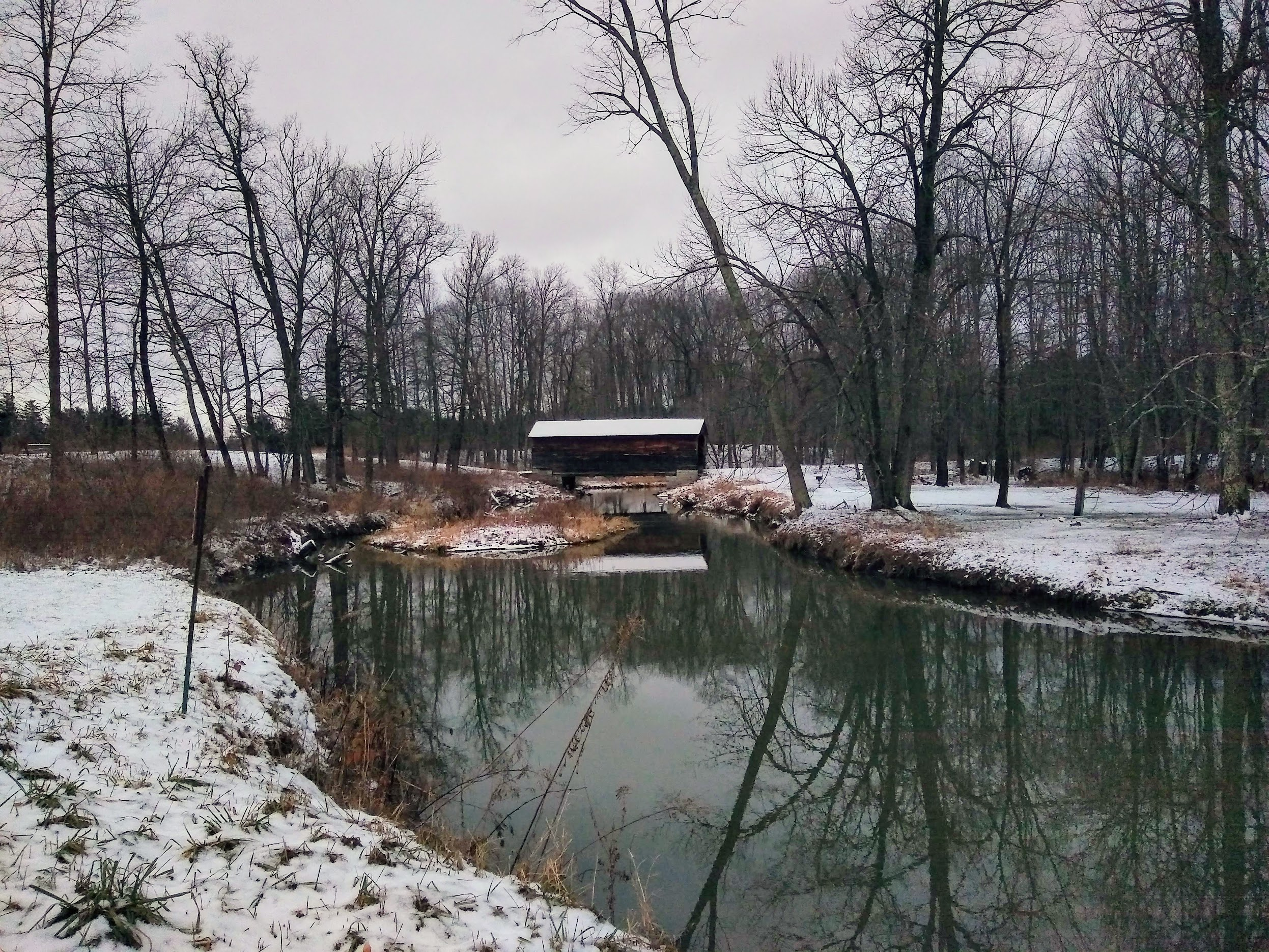
- Shadow Brook at Hyde Hall Bridge in December 2021

- Location of the mouth of Shadow Brook Shadow Brook (the United States)

Location
- Country: United States
- State: New York
- Region: Central New York Region
- County: Otsego
- Town: Springfield

Physical characteristics
- Source
  - location: NNE of East Springfield
  - coordinates: 42°51′26″N 74°47′50″W
- Mouth: Otsego Lake
  - location: SSE of Springfield Center
  - coordinates: 42°47′13″N 74°52′06″W
  - elevation: 1,194 ft (364 m)
- Basin size: 17.5 sq mi (45 km^{2})

Basin features
- Progression: Shadow Brook → Otsego Lake → Susquehanna River → Chesapeake Bay → Atlantic Ocean

Shadow Brook, also known as East Springfield Brook, is a river in northern Otsego County in the U.S. State of New York. It begins north-northeast of the Hamlet of East Springfield, and flows into Otsego Lake south-southeast of the Hamlet of Springfield Center, near Glimmerglass State Park. It is the largest watershed in the Otsego Lake basin.

== History ==
Shadow Brook flows under the historic Hyde Hall Bridge, a covered bridge that was built in 1825. The bridge consists of a single 53-foot (16 m) span using a Burr Arch Truss and was constructed by master carpenter Cyrenus Clark with assistance from carpenter Andrew Alden and stonemason Lorenzo Bates. Renovations to the bridge were performed by the State of New York in 1967. It is one of 29 historic covered bridges in New York State.

== Fishing ==
Suckers can be speared and taken from the creek from January 1 to May 15, each year.
