= Perrine's Bridge =

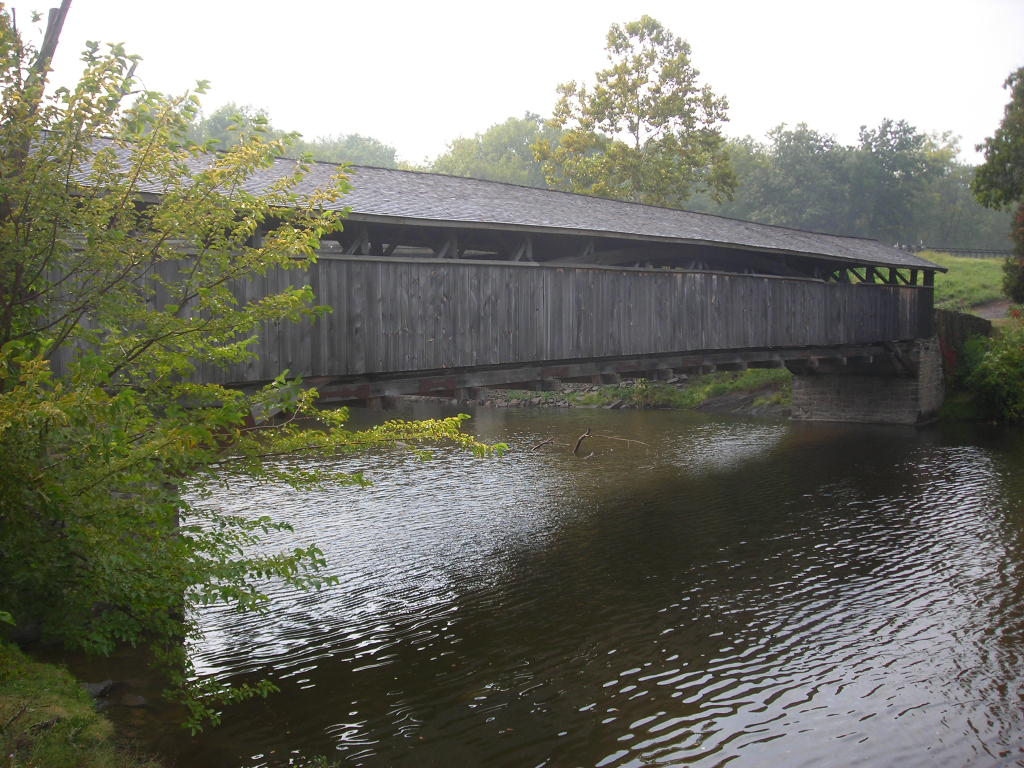
- Perrine's Bridge in September 2007
- Coordinates: 41°49′4″N 74°3′20″W
- Carries: Pedestrians only
- Crosses: Wallkill River

Characteristics
- Design: Burr-arch style
- Total length: 138 feet (42 m)
- Width: 20 feet (6 m)
- Clearance above: 11 feet (3.4 m)
- Perrine's Bridge
- U.S. National Register of Historic Places
- Location within New York Location within the United States
- Location: Off I-87 over Wallkill River, Rosendale, New York
- Area: 21 acres (8.5 ha)
- Built: 1844
- Architectural style: Burr Arch
- NRHP reference No.: 73001281
- Added to NRHP: April 13, 1973

Location
- Interactive map of Perrine's Bridge

Perrine's Bridge is the second-oldest covered bridge in the State of New York, after the Hyde Hall Bridge in East Springfield. Once located in the hamlet called Perrines Bridge between 1850 and 1861. It is located in the modern day town of Esopus-Rosendale, New York just a few hundred feet to the east of Interstate 87 crossing of the Wallkill River in Ulster County, New York. Originally built to aid in the movement of trade between the towns of Rifton and Rosendale, the bridge is about 90 miles north of New York City between mile markers 81 and 82 on the New York State Thruway (Interstate 87). In May 1834 the State of New York authorized and provided money ($700) to Ulster county, NY (which invested $1500), to build the bridge. In 1835, the bridge was built by Benjamin Wood (b. 1780 d. 1838), the one-lane wooden covered bridge has been closed to vehicular traffic since 1930. The Bridge derives its name from James W. Perrine (b. 1780 d. 1849), a descendant of Daniel Perrin "The Huguenot", who was a tavern keeper that opened an inn on the east side of that future bridge in 1820. Perrine's son was hired each winter as the "snower". He would spread snow the length of the structure so horse-drawn sleighs could cross.

It was declared as a New York Historical site in 1966 and listed in the National Register of Historic Places as of April 13, 1973. It has been restored many times, the last in 1997 at a cost of $195,000.

== See also ==
- List of bridges and tunnels on the National Register of Historic Places in New York
- List of covered bridges in New York
- National Register of Historic Places listings in Ulster County, New York
