= Jay Bridge =

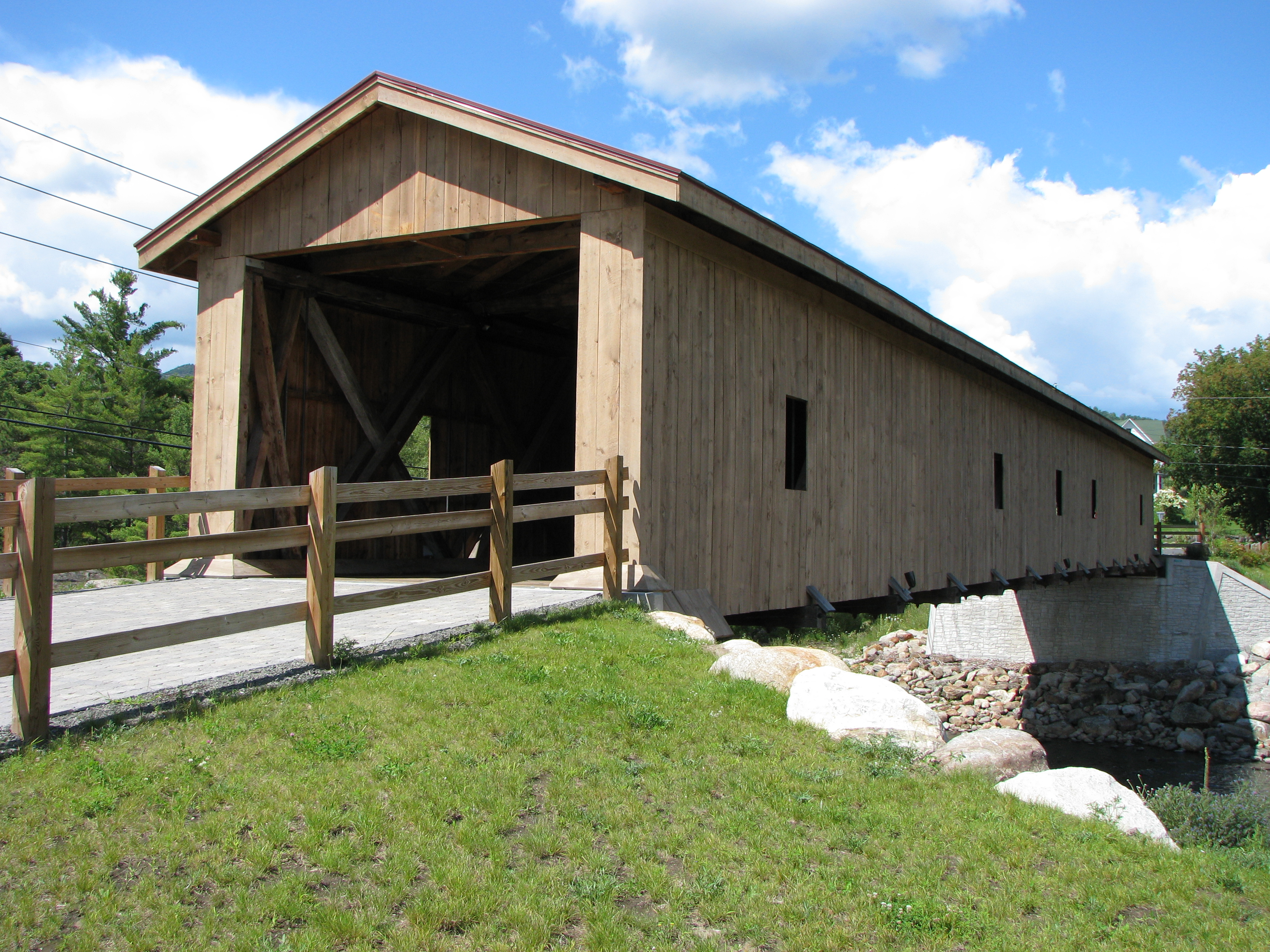
- Coordinates: 44°22′23″N 73°43′30″W
- Crosses: Ausable River

History
- Construction end: 1857

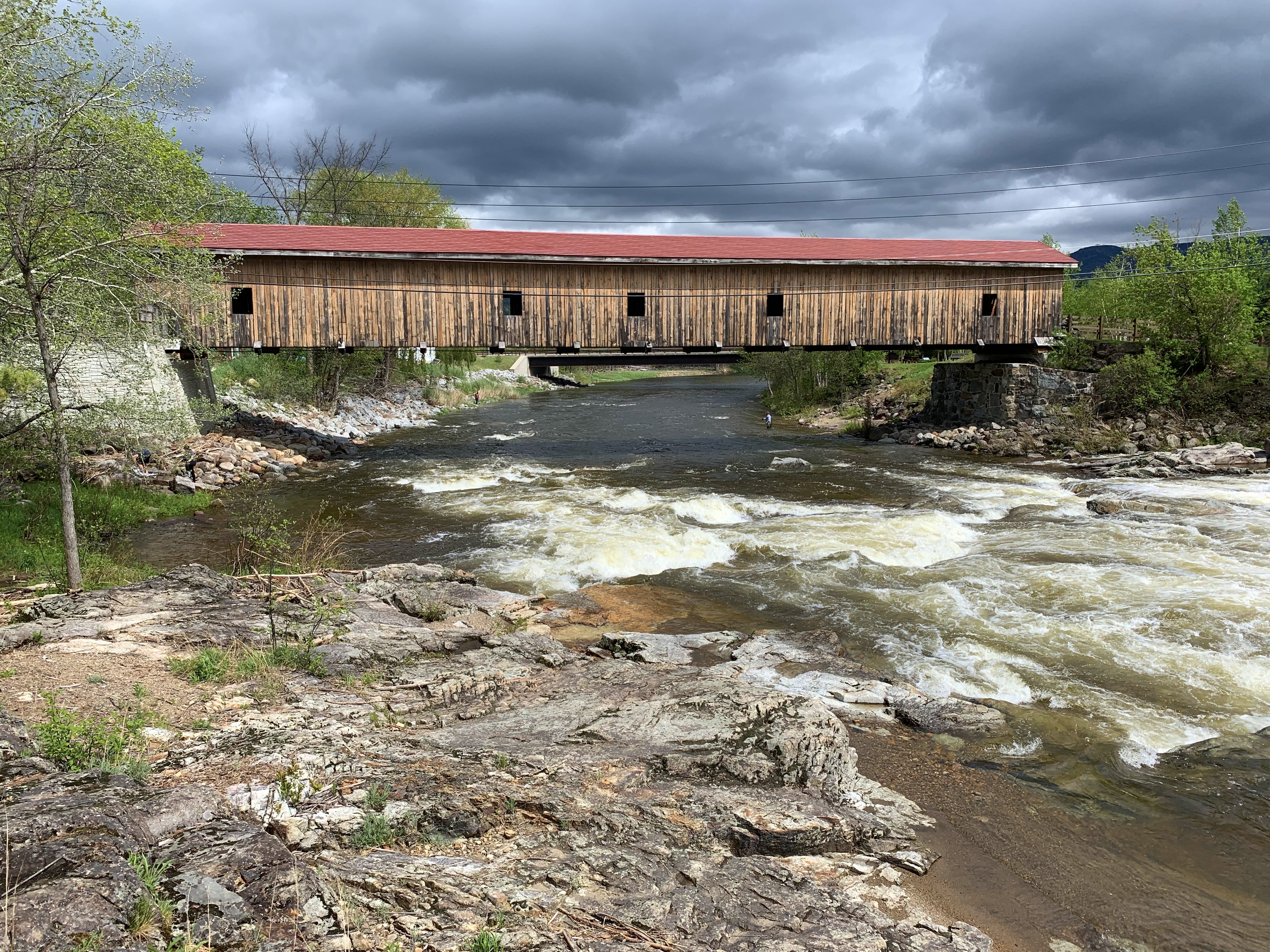
The Jay Covered Bridge spans the east branch of the Ausable River

Jay Bridge is a wooden covered bridge that spans the east branch of the Ausable River in Jay, Essex County, New York, USA. It is eligible to be listed in the National Register of Historic Places. Of the 29 covered bridges in New York State, it and the Copeland Bridge in the town of Edinburg, Saratoga County are the only two situated in the Adirondacks.

== History ==
The first bridge in this location was destroyed by flooding in 1856. The bridge was rebuilt in 1857 using a Howe truss design.

In 1953, a heavy truck fell through the floor of the bridge; repair required the replacement of 80 feet (24 m) of the damaged end of the bridge. In 1997, traffic was rerouted to a new steel bridge just downstream. The original has since been restored for pedestrians and bicycles.

== See also ==
- List of bridges documented by the Historic American Engineering Record in New York (state)
