= Sherwood Family Estate =

- U.S. National Register of Historic Places
- U.S. Historic district
- Location within New York Location within the United States
- Location: 484 Sherwood Rd., Delhi, New York
- Coordinates: 42°15′50″N 74°56′3″W
- Area: 222 acres (90 ha)
- Built: 1804
- Architectural style: Early Republic, Late 19th And 20th Century Revivals
- NRHP reference No.: 02001648
- Added to NRHP: December 31, 2002

Sherwood Family Estate is a historic farm and national historic district located at Delhi in Delaware County, New York. The district contains four contributing buildings and one contributing site. It was developed over the period 1801 to about 1925 and is composed of six estate buildings, a designed landscape, and an agricultural landscape. Buildings include the residence, ice house, garage, laundry, and spring house.

It was listed on the National Register of Historic Places in 2002.

== See also ==
- National Register of Historic Places listings in Delaware County, New York
