= Ashokan Bridge =

- Ashokan-Turnwood Covered Bridge
- U.S. National Register of Historic Places
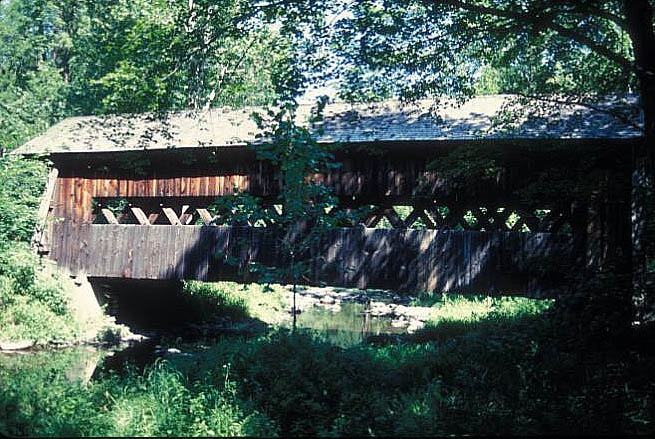
- The bridge crosses Esopus Creek

- Location within New York Location within the United States
- Location: 477 Beaverkill Road, Olivebridge, New York
- Coordinates: 41°55′35.69″N 74°11′57.62″W
- Area: less than one acre
- Built: 1885
- Built by: Tompkins, Nelson
- Architectural style: covered bridge
- NRHP reference No.: 00000822
- Added to NRHP: July 20, 2000

Ashokan Bridge (also known as the Turnwood Bridge or New Paltz Campus Bridge) is a wooden covered bridge over Esopus Creek on the grounds of the Ashokan Center, in Ulster County, New York, United States. It was built in 1885, and is a single span, gable roofed, covered timber bridge. It measures 72 feet, 6 inches, long and 16 feet, 4 inches, wide. It was originally located at Turnwood and moved to its present location in 1939. It is situated in the Ashokan Center, which was formerly the Ashokan Field Campus of the State University of New York at New Paltz.

It was added to the National Register of Historic Places in 2000.

It is one of 29 covered bridges in New York State.
