= Van Tran Flat Bridge =

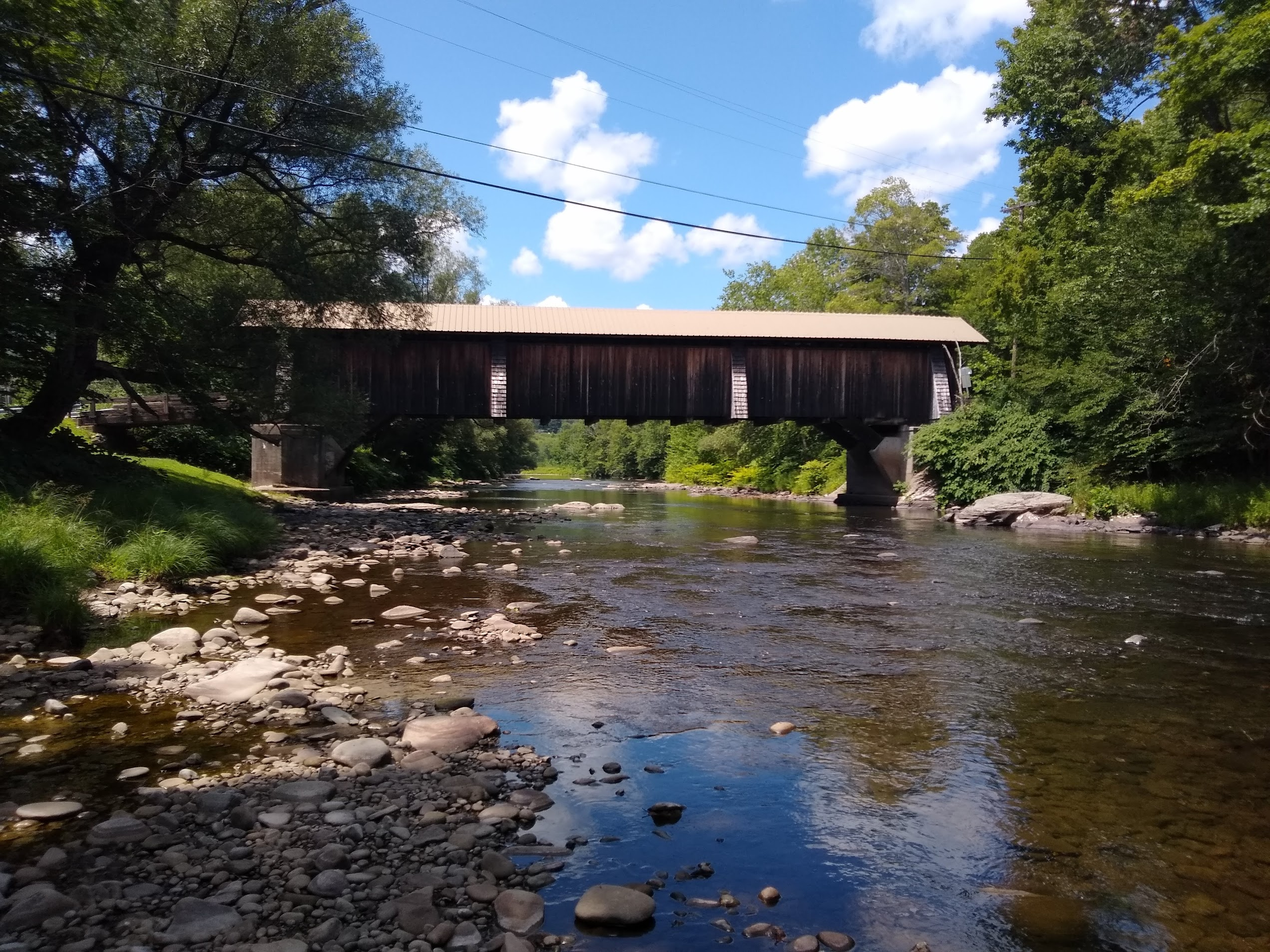
- The Van Tran Flat Bridge, image taken from the Willowemoc Creek
- Coordinates: 41°54′53″N 74°49′55″W
- Carries: Vehicle traffic
- Crosses: Willowemoc Creek
- Locale: Rockland, New York
- Other name(s): Motts Flats Bridge; Livingston Manor Covered Bridge; Van Tran Bridge
- Maintained by: Sullivan County, New York

Characteristics
- Design: Covered bridge
- Total length: 117 ft (36 m) (disputed)
- Width: 16 ft 6 inches (5.0 m)
- Load limit: 5 tons
- Clearance above: 7 ft 8 inches
- No. of lanes: Single span

History
- Constructed by: John Davidson
- Construction end: 1860
- Opened: 1860, reopened in 1985
- Closed: 1972 (temporarily)

The Van Tran Flat Bridge (also known as the Motts Flats Bridge, the Livingston Manor Covered Bridge, or the Van Tran Bridge) is a wooden, single span covered bridge that crosses Willowemoc Creek in the town of Rockland, in Sullivan County, New York. The bridge was built in 1860 by John Davidson and features a town lattice truss and a laminated arch system. This makes the Van Tran Flat Bridge the oldest surviving covered bridge in Sullivan County. The bridge was closed and abandoned in 1972, but restoration began in 1984 and reopened the next year. The Van Tran Flat Bridge is a disputed 117 feet (36 m) in length, and leads to Livingston Manor Covered Bridge County Park.

== Description ==
The Van Tran Flat Bridge is a wooden, single span covered bridge located 1 mile (1.6 km) outside of Livingston Manor, New York. Its assigned covered bridge number is NY-53-05. The bridge was constructed from timber and followed a similar design to other bridges in the Catskill region. This bridge features a town lattice truss and a laminated arch system. The total weight capacity is 10,000 pounds (4,500 kg), the clear width is 11 feet (3.4 m), the out-to-out (Note: Also known as total width) width is 16.5 feet (5.0 m), and the vertical clearance is 7.6 feet (2.3 m). The sides are made of wood, have an opening under their eaves, and at each end of the bridge there are 4 buttresses spanning the height of the bridge.

The two openings to the bridge are uniform with each other and the gable stones have a flat, chamfered design. The roof is made of metal. The north-facing abutment is made of stone and concrete, while the south-facing abutment is made of concrete. The exact dimensions of the bridge are disputed amongst sources. Two accounts from 1952 and 1974 claim the bridge is 98 feet (30 m) in length and 43 feet (13 m) across. The New York State Covered Bridge Society claims the bridge is 117 ft length, the originally reported length when constructed. Sullivan County claims the bridge is 103 feet (31 m) in length.

=== Associated locations ===
The Van Tran Flat Bridge leads to the Livingston Manor Covered Bridge Park, and is located adjacent to the original homestead of Nobel laureate Dr. John Mott.

== History ==
The Van Tran Flat Bridge (originally named the Motts Flats Bridge, later referred to as the Livingston Manor Covered Bridge or the Van Tran Bridge) was first constructed in 1860 by John Davidson to cross the Willowemoc Creek. This was an extension of Covered Bridge Road in the town of Rockland, in Sullivan County, New York. The Van Tran Flat Bridge was constructed 5 years before the Beaverkill Covered Bridge, also built by John Davidson. This makes the Van Tran Flat Bridge the oldest of the 4 covered bridges in Sullivan County still standing.

Describing the original proposal for the bridge, the Youngsville Local Record newspaper recounted:

"That the sum of two hundred and fifty dollars be levied and assessed upon the county of Sullivan, and paid to the Commissioner of Highways of the town of Rockland to be applied on the building of a bridge over the Willowemock Creek, on the road leading from Liberty to the West field Flats, near the house of Erastus Sprague in said town of Rockland."

In 1925, the bridge suffered minor damage in a flood. During this time, the bridge was bypassed by New York State Route 17. On August 26, 1940, the Van Tran Flat Bridge's decking was damaged by a loaded truck when it veered off the bridge into the Willowemoc Creek. Repair of the bridge involved $437.75 worth of materials and $174.80 in labor, with 8 workers being responsible for the repairs. Some time after 1958, the bridge's dry-laid stone abutments were refaced with concrete.

In 1972, the bridge was closed and abandoned. In 1984, the Sullivan County's Department of Public Works, in conjunction with Milton S. Graton, began restoring the bridge using original construction techniques. The work included replacement of the truss, chords, floor, roof, and treenails, along with removal of the original queenpost truss. A decision was also made to increase the bridge's load limit, which was achieved by the addition of laminated arches. The bridge was reopened in November 1985.

Today, the bridge is owned and maintained by Sullivan County, New York, and is open to cars. The New York State Covered Bridge Society has classified the Van Tran Flat Bridge as one of 24 "authentic" historic covered bridges in the state of New York. The placard next to the bridge claims it is on both the State and National Register of Historic Places. (Note: While the placard next to the bridge claims it is on both the State and National Register of Historic Places, this is incorrect.)

== Gallery ==
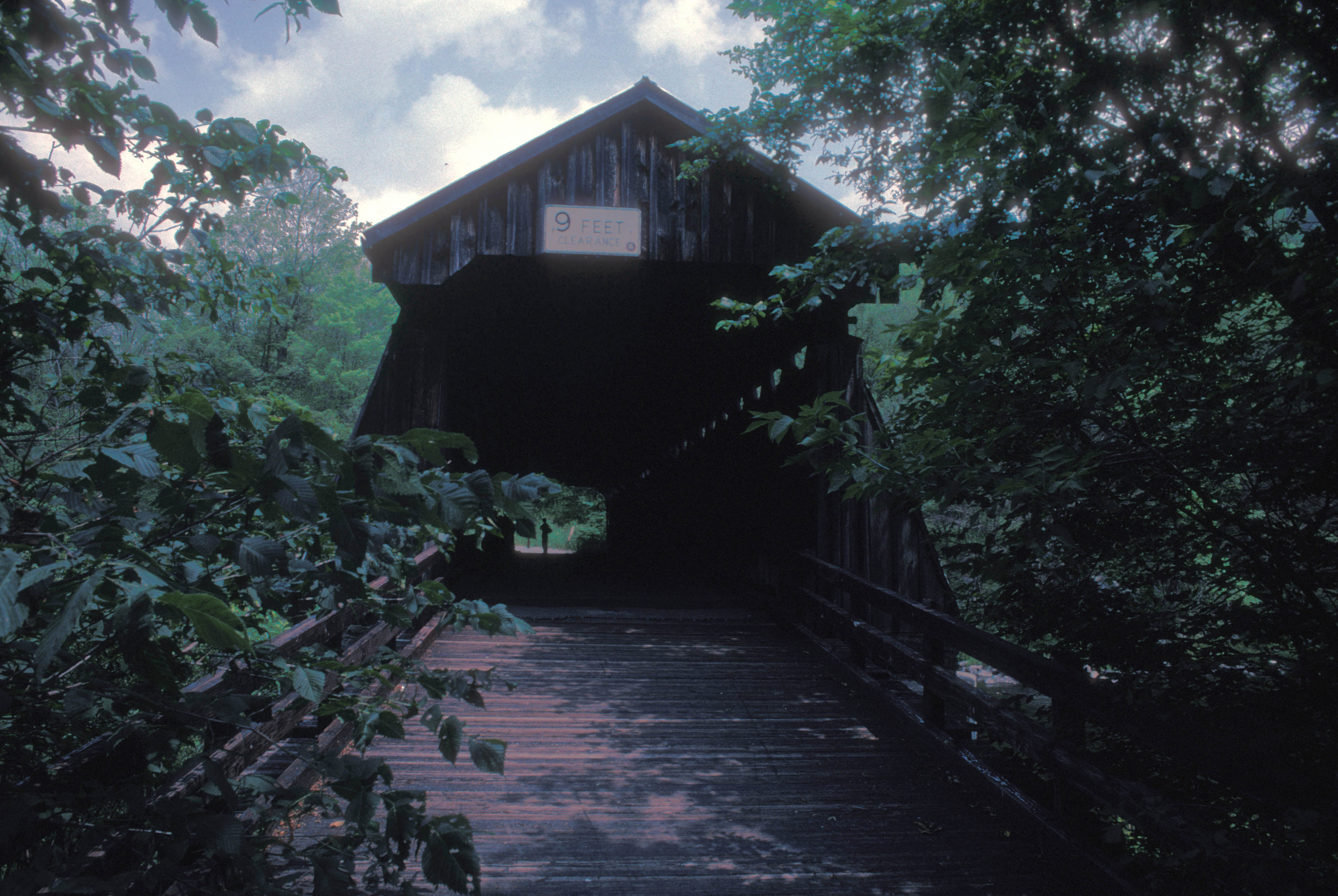
Front view of the Van Tran Flat Bridge

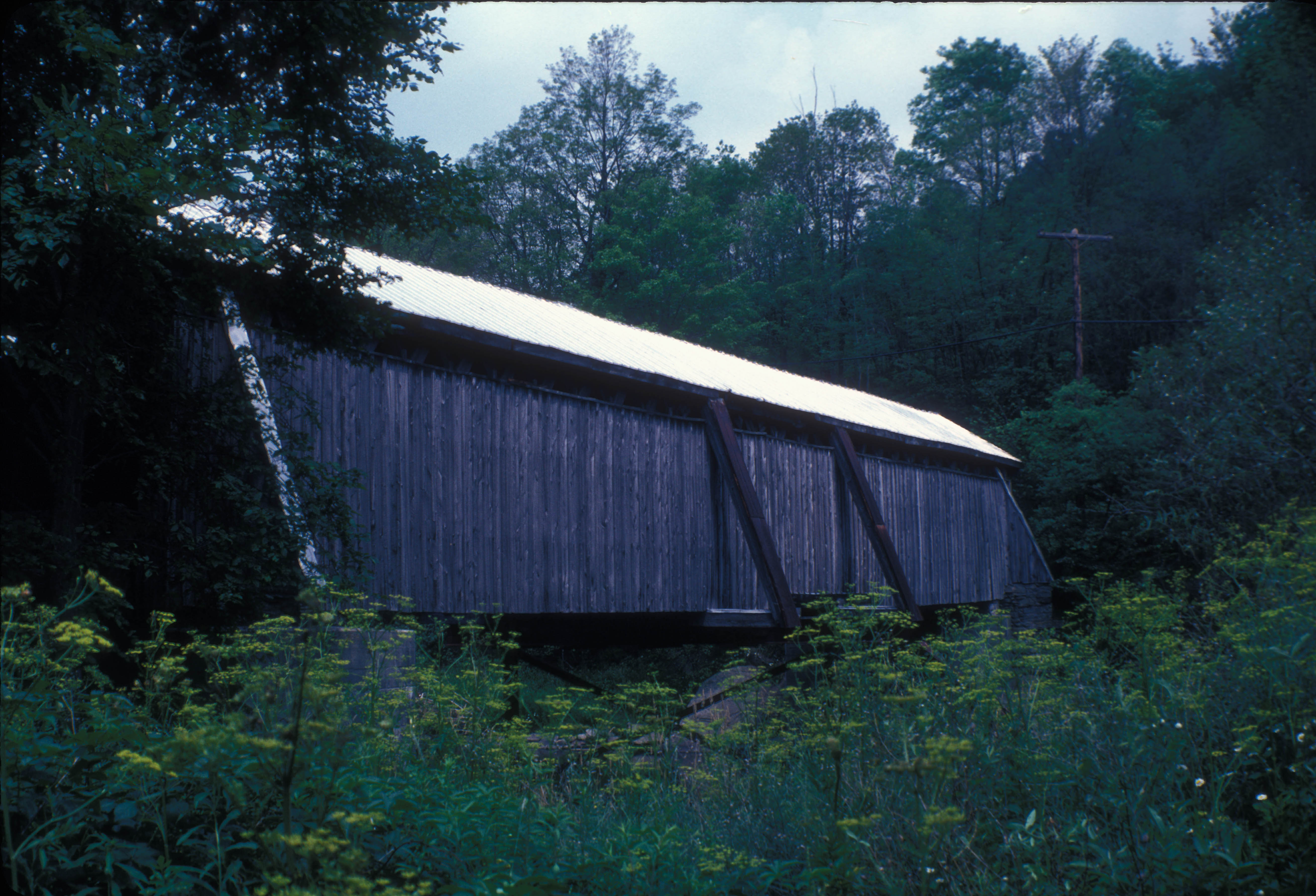
Side view of the Van Tran Flat Covered Bridge, taken from the bank of the Willowemoc Creek.

== See also ==
- List of covered bridges in New York
- Bendo Bridge
