= Tuscarora Club Bridge =

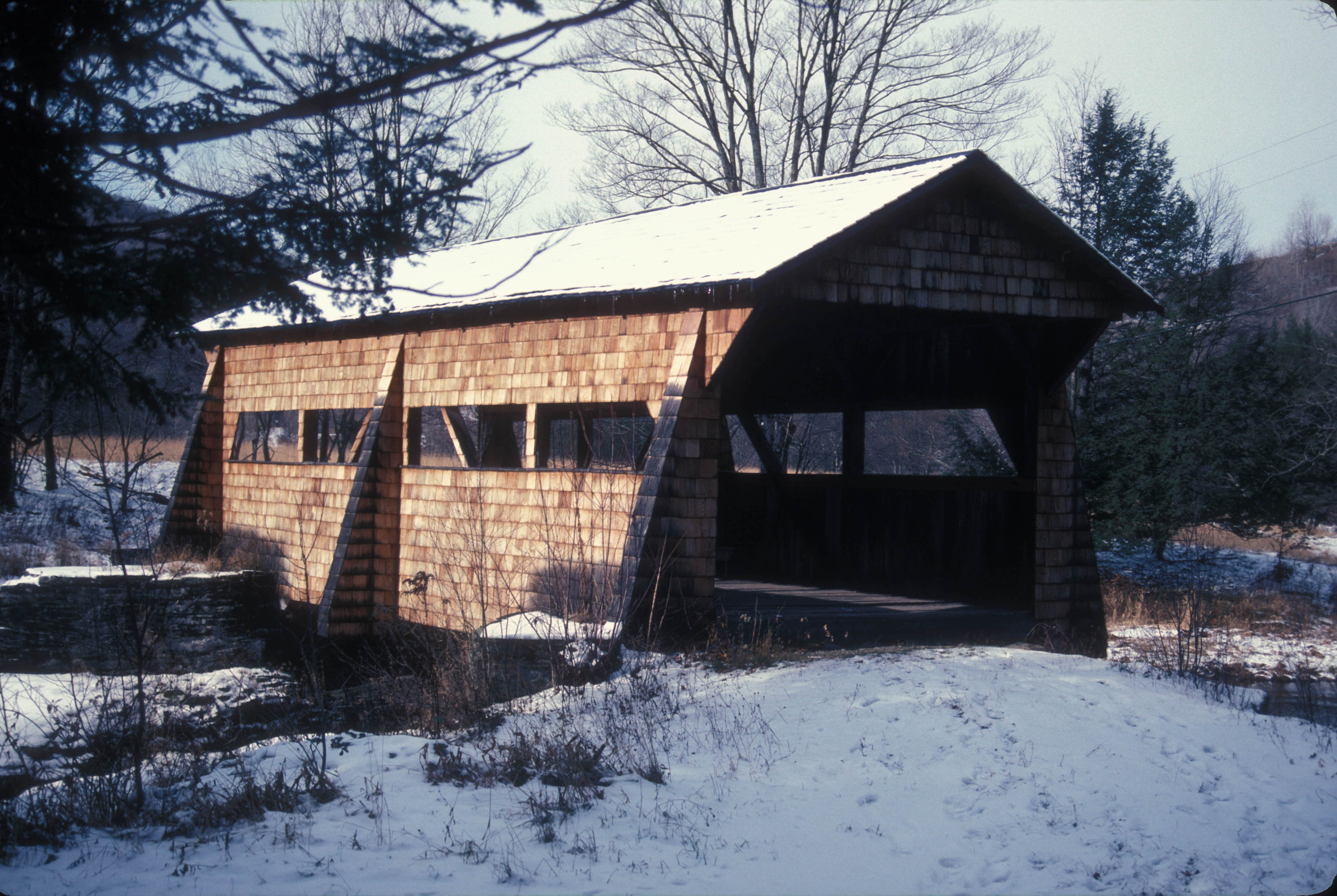
- Coordinates: 42°05′13″N 74°00′47″W
- Carries: Pedestrian
- Crosses: Mill Brook

History
- Construction end: 1870

Tuscarora Club Bridge (also known as Demis Covered Bridge and the Dunraven Covered Bridge) is a wooden covered bridge in the Town of Middletown, New York. It is one of 24 covered bridges in New York State. It is one of three that is less historic and is not landmarked.

The bridge started as a 38 foot long Queenpost truss toll gate bridge built in 1870 by William Mead. It originally spanned the Platte Kill stream in the village of Dunraven. According to Ward Herrmann, “When the new road was constructed from Margaretville to Arena, it crossed the stream on a modern iron bridge below the old route, and the covered bridge was left abandoned.” In 1935 it was moved to its present location on property owned by the Tuscarora Club south of Margaretville off Mill Road. It was shortened to 24 feet and became a Kingpost truss. These changes rendered it ineligible for the National Register of Historic Places. Today it carries foot trail over Mill Brook and is closed to vehicular traffic and people who are not members or guests of the Club.

In 2011, the bridge was significantly damaged due to flooding caused by Hurricane Irene. It was repaired in 2013.
