= West Delhi Presbyterian Church, Manse, and Cemetery =

Historic church in New York, United States

- U.S. National Register of Historic Places
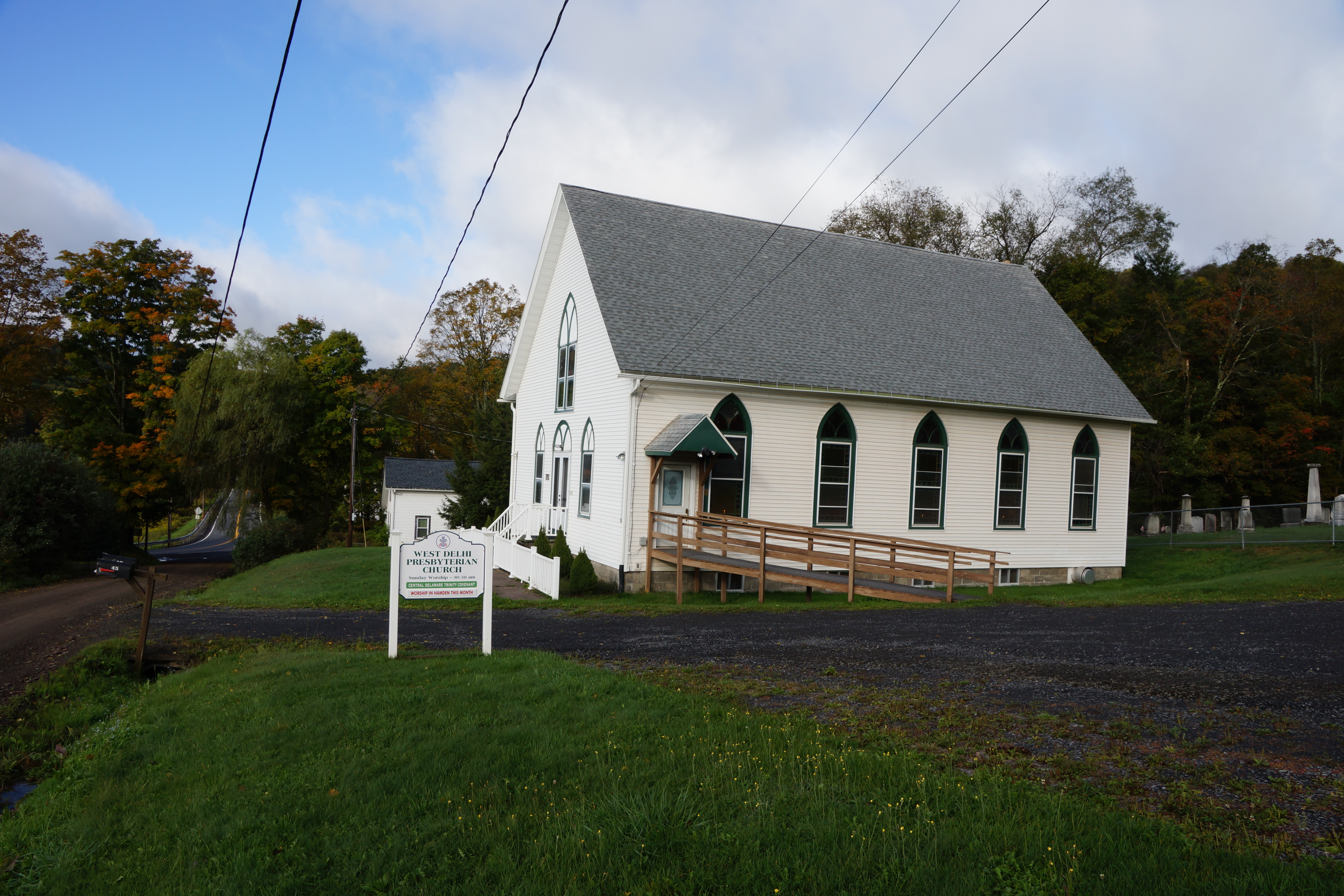

- Location within New York Location within the United States
- Location: 18 and 45 Sutherland Rd., West Delhi, New York
- Coordinates: 42°18′0.41″N 75°0′25.29″W
- Area: 4 acres (1.6 ha)
- Built: 1892
- Architectural style: Late Victorian
- NRHP reference No.: 08001032
- Added to NRHP: November 7, 2008

West Delhi Presbyterian Church, Manse, and Cemetery is a historic Presbyterian church complex and cemetery at 18 and 45 Sutherland Road in West Delhi, Delaware County, New York. The church is a one-story, rectangular wood-frame building constructed in 1892. It is surmounted by a steep gable roof with overhanging eaves. The manse was built about 1840 and is a large two story wood-frame building with a cross gable plan. The West Delhi Cemetery contains the graves of most settlement era families and features stones typical of their period and style.

It was added to the National Register of Historic Places in 2008.

== See also ==
- National Register of Historic Places listings in Delaware County, New York
