= Delhi, New York =

- Town
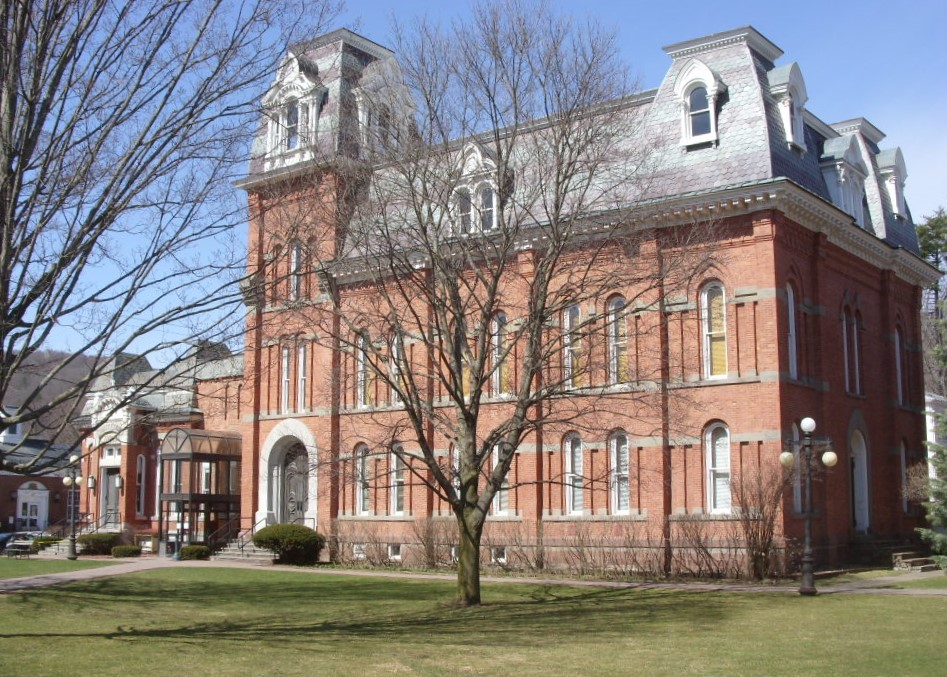
- Delaware County Courthouse

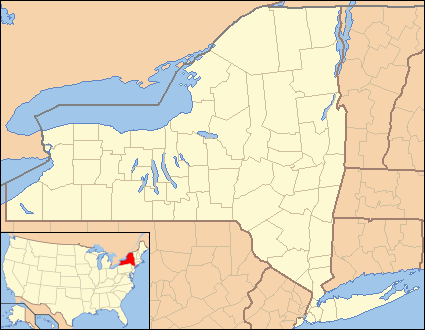
- Location of Delhi in New York
- Coordinates: 42°16′27″N 74°55′31″W
- Country: United States
- State: New York
- County: Delaware
- Named for: Delhi, India

Government
  - Type: Town Council
  - Town Supervisor: Maya Boukai (D)
  - Town Council: Members' List: • Christina Viafore (D); • Matthew Krzyston (D); • Josh Morgan (R); • Margaret Baldwin (R)

Area
  - Total: 64.60 sq mi (167.31 km^{2})
  - Land: 64.20 sq mi (166.27 km^{2})
  - Water: 0.40 sq mi (1.04 km^{2})

Population (2020)
  - Total: 4,795
  - Density: 74.69/sq mi (28.84/km^{2})
- Time zone: UTC-5 (Eastern (EST))
  - Summer (DST): UTC-4 (EDT)
- ZIP Codes: 13753 (Delhi); 13752 (Delancey)
- Area code: 607
- FIPS code: 36-025-20137
- GNIS feature ID: 978895
- Website: townofdelhiny.gov

Delhi (/ˈdɛl.haɪ/ DEL-hy) is a town in Delaware County, New York, United States. The population was 5545 at the 2025 census. The town is in the east-central part of the county and contains the village of Delhi. The State University of New York at Delhi is located in the town.

The town was named after Delhi, India, in honor of founder Ebenezer Foote, who was known as "The Great Mogul". The pronunciation is attributed to Foote's rival Erastus Root, who reportedly exclaimed upon learning of the town's name, "Delhi, Hell-high! Might as well call it Foote-high." An alternate explanation of its pronunciation and namesake is due to its location, high on the Delaware River.

== History ==
Delhi was formed from the towns of Kortright, Middletown, and Walton, on March 23, 1798.

== Geography ==
The town is in the center of Delaware County. According to the United States Census Bureau, the town has a total area of 64.6 square miles (167.3 km^{2}), of which 64.2 square miles (166.3 km^{2}) is land and 0.39 square miles (1.0 km^{2}), or 0.62%, is water. The West Branch Delaware River flows through the center of the town. The Little Delaware River enters the West Branch from the east, just south of Delhi village.

=== Climate ===
Climate data for Delhi, New York (1991-2020 normals)
Month	Jan	Feb	Mar	Apr	May	Jun	Jul	Aug	Sep	Oct	Nov	Dec	Year
Mean daily maximum °C (°F)	−0.3 (31.5)	1.2 (34.2)	5.7 (42.3)	13.1 (55.6)	19.7 (67.4)	24.0 (75.2)	26.4 (79.6)	25.8 (78.5)	22.1 (71.7)	15.3 (59.5)	8.3 (46.9)	2.4 (36.3)	13.7 (56.6)
Daily mean °C (°F)	−5.8 (21.6)	−4.7 (23.6)	−0.3 (31.5)	6.4 (43.6)	12.7 (54.8)	17.2 (63.0)	19.6 (67.3)	18.9 (66.1)	15.1 (59.2)	8.8 (47.9)	3.0 (37.4)	−2.4 (27.7)	7.4 (45.3)
Mean daily minimum °C (°F)	−11.3 (11.6)	−10.6 (12.9)	−6.3 (20.7)	−0.2 (31.7)	5.7 (42.2)	10.5 (50.9)	12.8 (55.1)	12.1 (53.8)	8.2 (46.8)	2.3 (36.2)	−2.3 (27.8)	−7.2 (19.0)	1.2 (34.1)
Average rainfall mm (inches)	82 (3.22)	71 (2.79)	93 (3.66)	102 (4.02)	102 (4.01)	125 (4.92)	121 (4.76)	110 (4.32)	123 (4.83)	119 (4.70)	94 (3.69)	95 (3.73)	1,236 (48.65)

== Demographics ==
Historical population
Census	Pop.	Note	%±
1820	2,285		—
1830	2,116		−7.4%
1840	2,554		20.7%
1850	2,909		13.9%
1860	2,900		−0.3%
1870	2,920		0.7%
1880	2,941		0.7%
1890	2,908		−1.1%
1900	3,243		11.5%
1910	2,815		−13.2%
1920	2,721		−3.3%
1930	2,853		4.9%
1940	2,950		3.4%
1950	3,311		12.2%
1960	3,398		2.6%
1970	4,617		35.9%
1980	5,295		14.7%
1990	5,015		−5.3%
2000	4,629		−7.7%
2010	5,117		10.5%
2020	4,795		−6.3%
U.S. Decennial Census 2020

=== 2000 ===
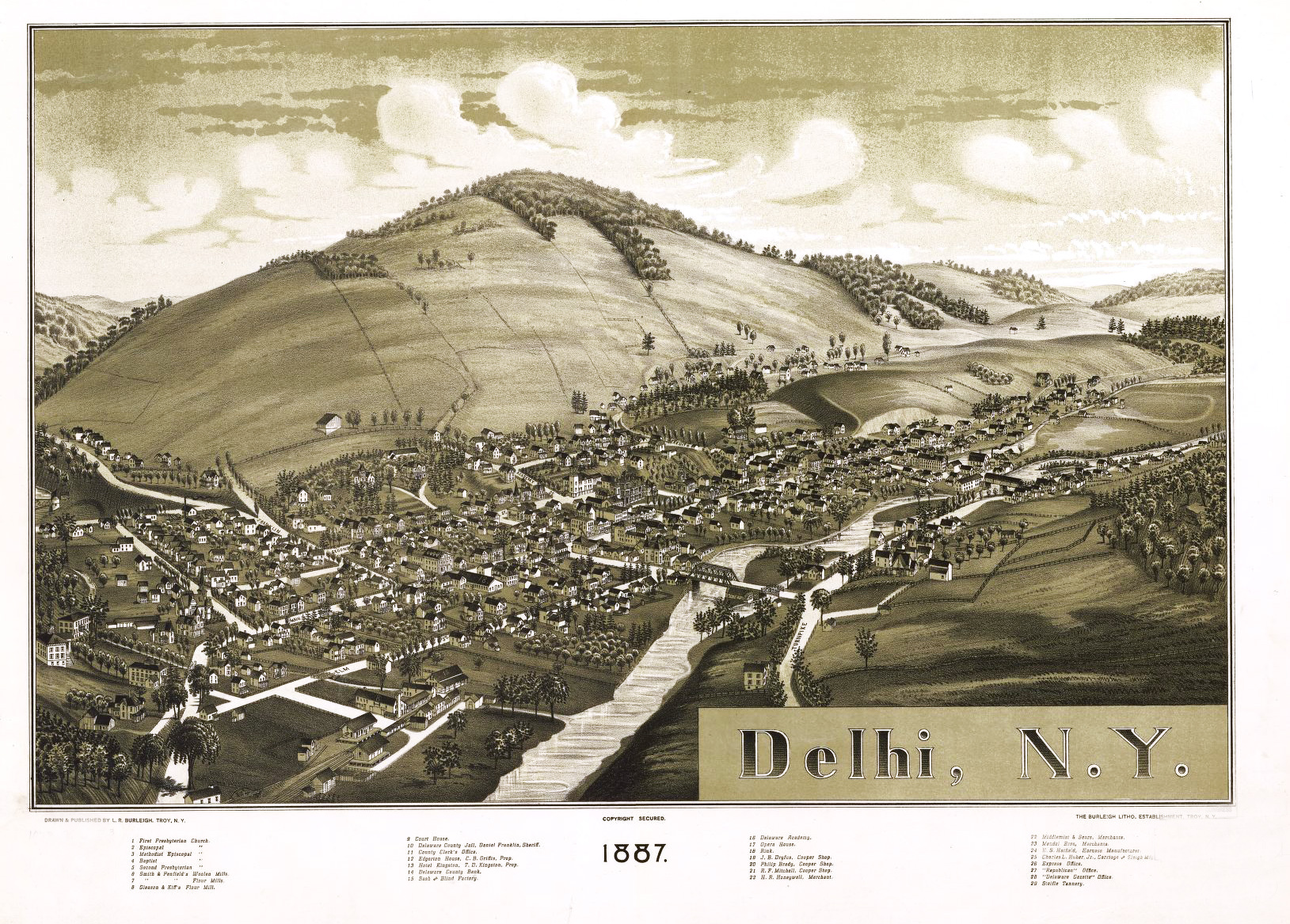
Delhi in 1887

As of the census of 2020, there were 4,795 people, 1,520 households, and 928 families residing in the town. The population density was 74.2 inhabitants per square mile (28.6/km^{2}). There were 1,893 housing units at an average density of 29.03 per square mile (11.21/km^{2}). The racial makeup of the town was 80.33% White, 9.05% Black or African American, 0.29% Native American, 1.94% Asian, 0.06% Pacific Islander, 3.02% from other races, and 5.29% from two or more races. Hispanic or Latino of any race made up 8.20% of the population.

There were 1,520 households, out of which 26.1% had children under the age of 18 living with them, 35.7% were married couples living together, 31.6% had a female householder with no husband present, and 37.8% were non-families. 30.0% of all households were made up of individuals, and 13.3% had someone living alone who was 65 years of age or older. The average household size was 2.29, and the average family size was 2.72.

In the town, the population was spread out, with 12.1% under the age of 18, 39.12% from 18 to 24, 14.31% from 25 to 44, 19.4% from 45 to 64, and 16.7% who were 65 years of age or older. The median age was 23.8 years. For every 100 females, there were 119.8 males.

The median income for a household in the town was $63,333, and the median income for a family was $84,038. The per capita income for the town was $16,842. About 16.7% of the population were below the poverty line, including 18.1% of those under age 18 and 6.5% of those age 65 or over.

== Communities and locations in the Town of Delhi ==
- Delhi – a village in the center of the town
- East Delhi – a hamlet northeast of Delhi village. The Christian Church and Fitches Covered Bridge are listed on the National Register of Historic Places.
- Fraser – a hamlet southwest of Delhi village on NY 10
- West Delhi – a hamlet west of Delhi village. Located here is the West Delhi Presbyterian Church, Manse, and Cemetery, which was listed on the National Register of Historic Places in 2008.

== Landmarks ==
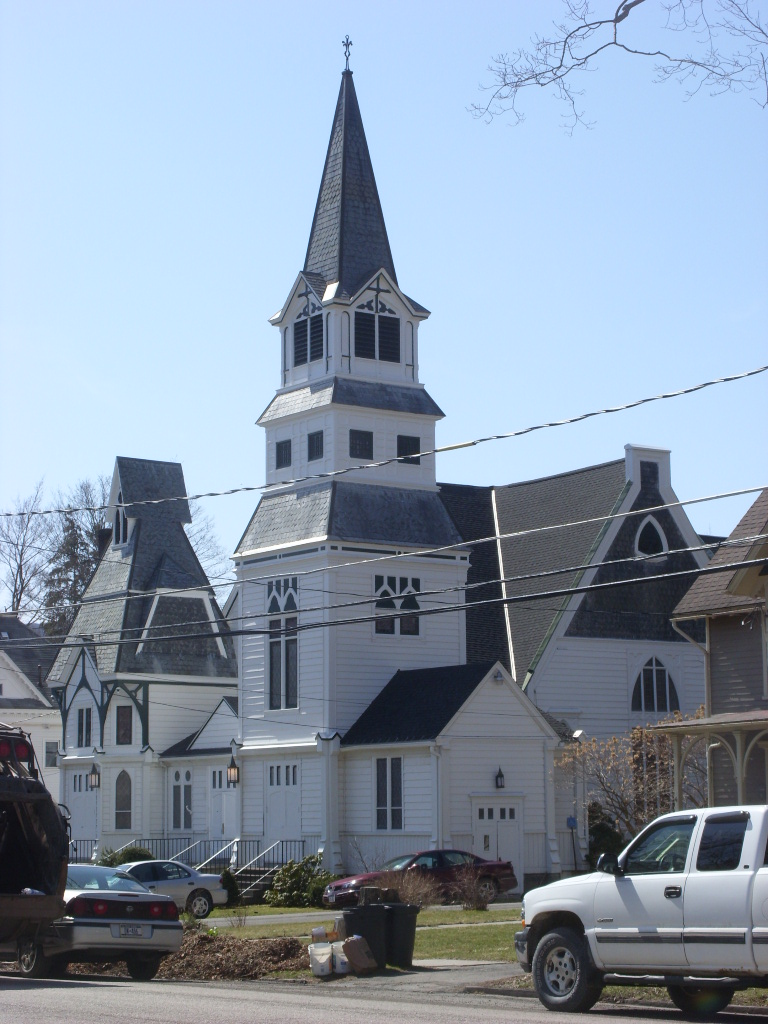
First Presbyterian Church, Delhi

Perspective map of Delhi with list of landmarks from 1887 by L.R. Burleigh

- Delaware County Courthouse
- Gideon Frisbee House, where Delaware County was formed in 1797, now the site of the Delaware County Historical Association
- Soldiers Monument, erected to honor Civil War veterans, on the Courthouse Square
- Delhi Village Hall, formerly the Delaware County Courthouse, where trials were held during the Anti-Rent War
- Fitches Covered Bridge, built in 1870
- The Judge Gideon Frisbee House, Murray Hill, and Sherwood Family Estate are listed on the National Register of Historic Places.

== Education ==
- Delaware Academy (K-12)
- State University of New York at Delhi

== In popular culture ==
The town is the setting of the 1959 novel My Side of the Mountain by Jean Craighead George.

== Notable people ==
- Steve Burns
