= Salisbury Center Bridge =

Covered bridge in Herkimer County, New York

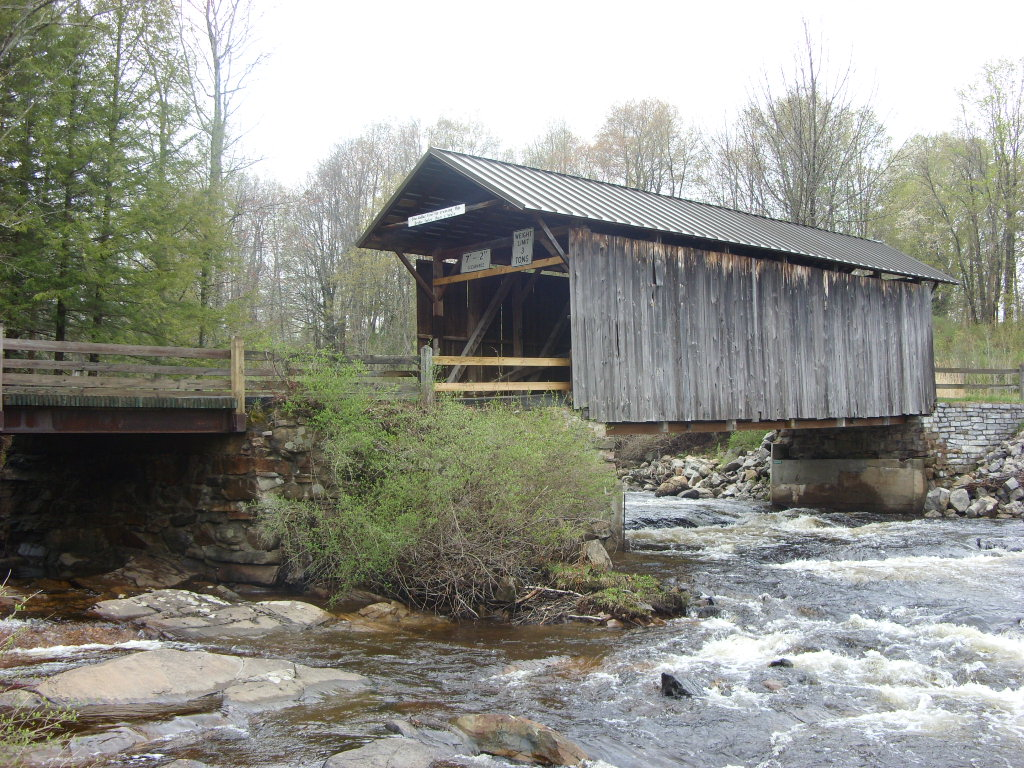
- Salisbury Covered Bridge, May 2008
- Coordinates: 43°08′28″N 74°47′17″W
- Crosses: Spruce Creek
- Salisbury Center Covered Bridge
- U.S. National Register of Historic Places
- Location: Fairview Road over Spruce Creek, Salisbury, Herkimer County, New York
- Coordinates: 43°8′26.97″N 74°47′16.83″W
- Built: 1875
- Architect: Theodore Burr and Alvah Hopson
- NRHP reference No.: 72000848
- Added to NRHP: June 19, 1972

Location
- Interactive map of Salisbury Center Bridge

Salisbury Center Bridge is the only covered bridge in Herkimer County, New York State. It was built in 1875, and is a wood frame Burr Truss bridge measuring 42 feet (13 metres) long and 16 feet (5 metres) wide. The bridge has vertical board siding and is topped by a gable roof. The wooden bridge is one of 29 covered bridges in New York State.

It was added to the National Register of Historic Places in 1972.
