= Grants Mills Bridge =

Grant Mills Bridge
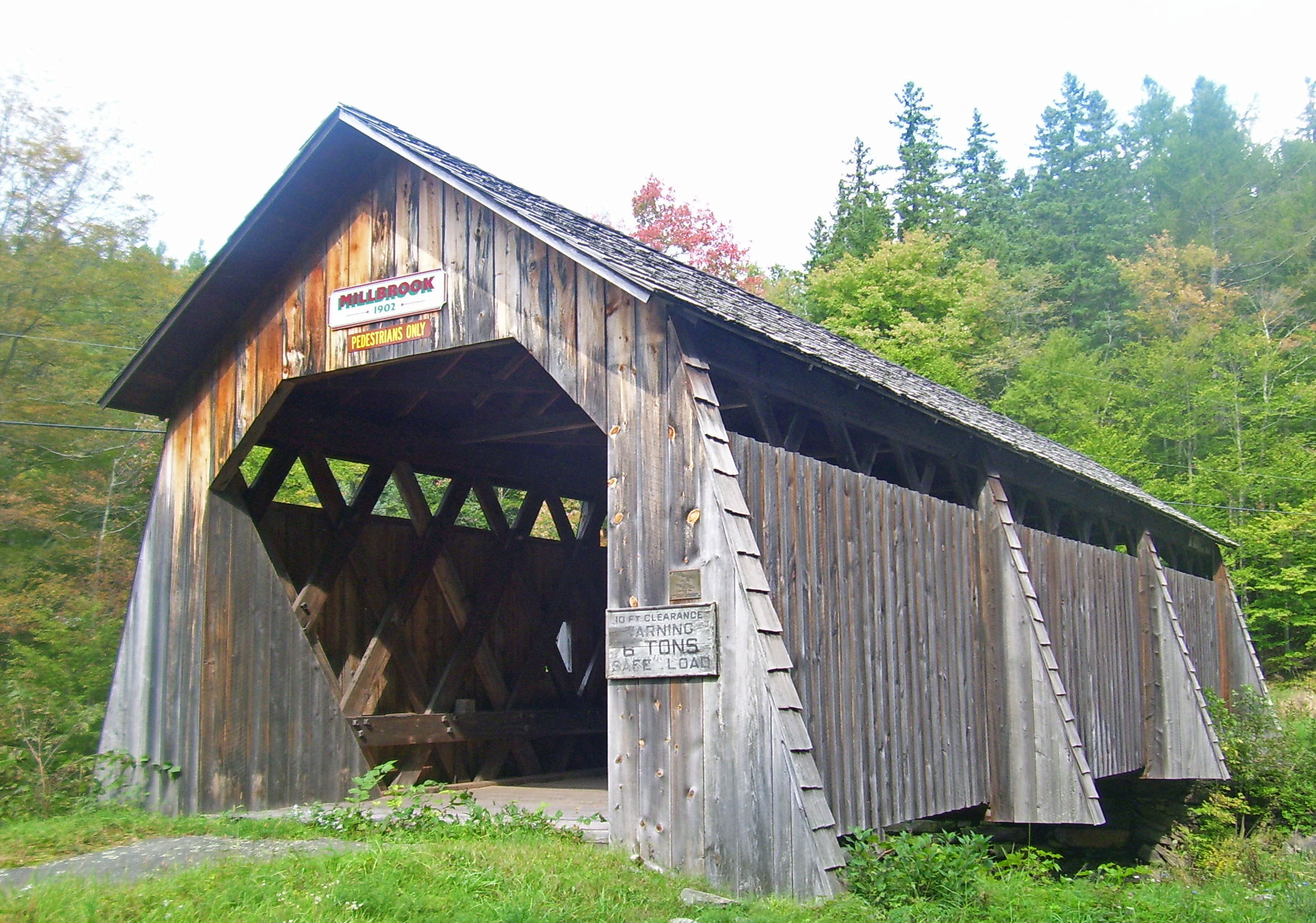
- South portal, 2008
- Coordinates: 42.0804°N 74.6367°W
- Carries: Pedestrians
- Crosses: Mill Brook
- Locale: Hardenburgh, NY, USA
- Official name: Millbrook Bridge
- Other name: Marks' Bridge
- Maintained by: Town of Hardenburgh
- Heritage status: NRHP #98001538

Characteristics
- Design: Town lattice truss covered bridge
- Total length: 69 1/2 feet (21.2 m)
- Width: 13 feet 10 inches (4.22 m)
- Height: 11 feet (3.4 m)

History
- Constructed by: Edgar and Orrin Marks
- Construction end: 1902
- Opened: 1902
- Closed: 1964

Statistics
- Daily traffic: n/a

Location
- Interactive map of Grant Mills Bridge

The Grant Mills Bridge, officially the Millbrook Bridge, is a wooden covered bridge over Mill Brook in Hardenburgh, New York, United States. It is one of 29 covered bridges in the state.

It was built in 1902 by a pair of local builders in the lattice truss design perfected early in the previous century by Ithiel Town. It was taken out of service in 1964 when Mill Brook Road was relocated a short distance to the south, but remains in excellent condition and is open to foot traffic. In 1999, it was listed on the National Register of Historic Places.

== Structure ==
The bridge is located on the west corner of the junction of Mill Brook and Fred Davis roads a short distance east of the Delaware County line. The area is wooded, just under 1,900 feet (580 m) in elevation with the ground sloping gently to the northeast. It spans the brook, a tributary of the East Branch of the Delaware River that drains into New York City's Pepacton Reservoir, just to the west of a more modern bridge carrying vehicle traffic.

It is a single span, 69 1/2 feet (21.2 m) in length, supported by rough abutments of dry-laid fieldstone. Its superstructure incorporates the Town lattice truss design. Both chords and the diagonals, connected by wood pins at each intersection, are formed by heavy paired planks. Planks laid on stringers form the deck; alternating timbers protrude to create a series of four buttresses on the sides of the bridge. Vertical board sheathing on horizontal nailers constitutes the bridge's siding; the roof and buttresses are clad in wood shingles.

== History ==
In 1902 the town of Hardenburgh awarded local carpenter Edgar Marks the contract to build a bridge over Mill Brook near the county line, a couple of miles below its headwaters on Balsam Lake Mountain. It would serve the small population of farmers and millers that lived in the remote valley.

With help from his son Orrin, he got to work hauling the stone and cutting the planks. He used the Town lattice truss, a reliable design for building a lasting bridge of this size from local materials. With the help of several other local craftsmen, the bridge was opened late that year.

It took its popular name from a mill two miles (3 km) to the west at the intersection of Mill Brook and what is now Kittle Road. Grant's Mill was often used in giving directions, as at that time the road was not maintained year-round. Marks called it the Lattice Bridge in his reports to the town; officials referred to it by his name.

It would later withstand and serve automobile traffic as well. When Mill Brook Road was realigned in 1964, the bridge was taken out of service. It remained in place despite the neglect. In the early 1990s Marks' descendants restored it. The town board renamed it the Millbrook Bridge in 2002, after it had been listed on the Register, to avoid further confusion.

== See also ==
- List of bridges on the National Register of Historic Places in New York
- List of covered bridges in New York
- National Register of Historic Places listings in Ulster County, New York
