= Fitches Bridge =

Historic covered bridge in New York State

Fitch's Bridge
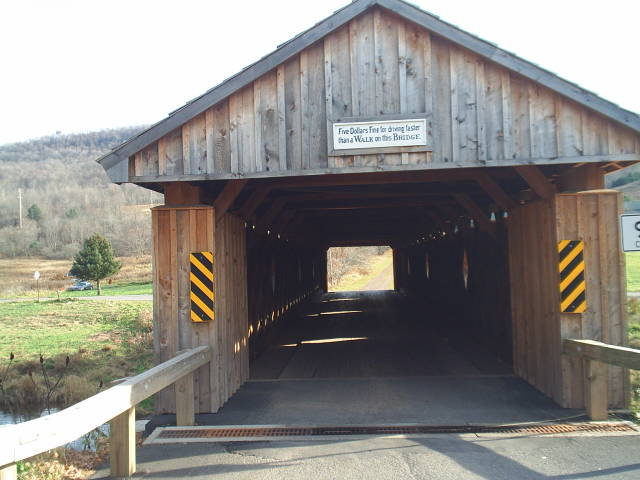
- Fitches Covered Bridge, November 2004
- Coordinates: 42°17′53″N 74°52′48″W
- Crosses: West Branch of the Delaware River
- Fitches Covered Bridge
- U.S. National Register of Historic Places
- Location within New York Location within the United States
- Location: Fitches Bridge Road, East Delhi, New York
- Coordinates: 42°17′53″N 74°52′47″W
- Area: less than one acre
- Built: 1870, 1885
- Built by: James Frazer, James Warren
- NRHP reference No.: 99000508
- Added to NRHP: April 29, 1999

Location
- Interactive map of Fitch's Bridge

Fitch's Bridge is a wooden covered bridge over the West Branch of the Delaware River. It is in the town of Delhi and is one of 24 covered bridges in New York State. It was originally erected in 1870 in the village of Delhi, and moved to its present location in 1885. The single-span, timber bridge measures 106 feet (32 m) long and 20 feet (6.1 m) wide.

It was added to the National Register of Historic Places in 1999.

== Gallery ==
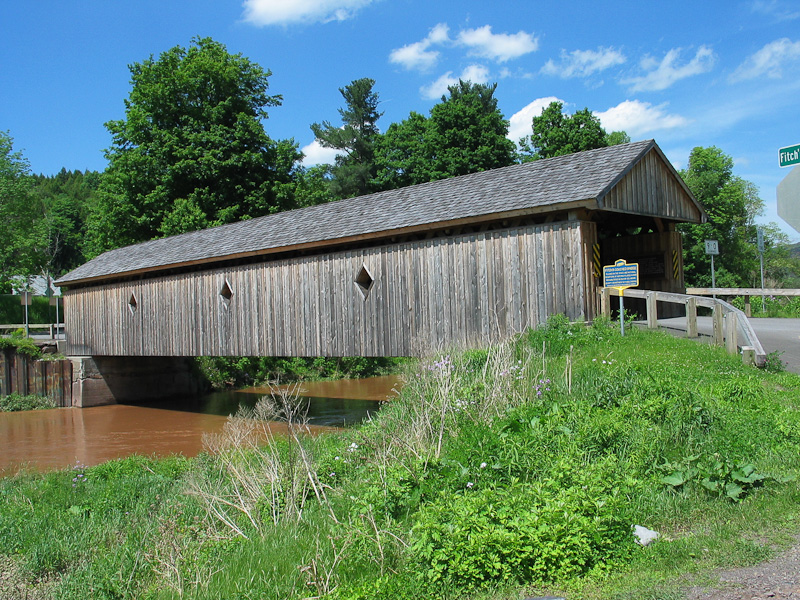
Fitch's Bridge, May 2004

== See also ==
- List of bridges on the National Register of Historic Places in New York
- List of covered bridges in New York
- National Register of Historic Places listings in Delaware County, New York
