= Bendo Bridge =

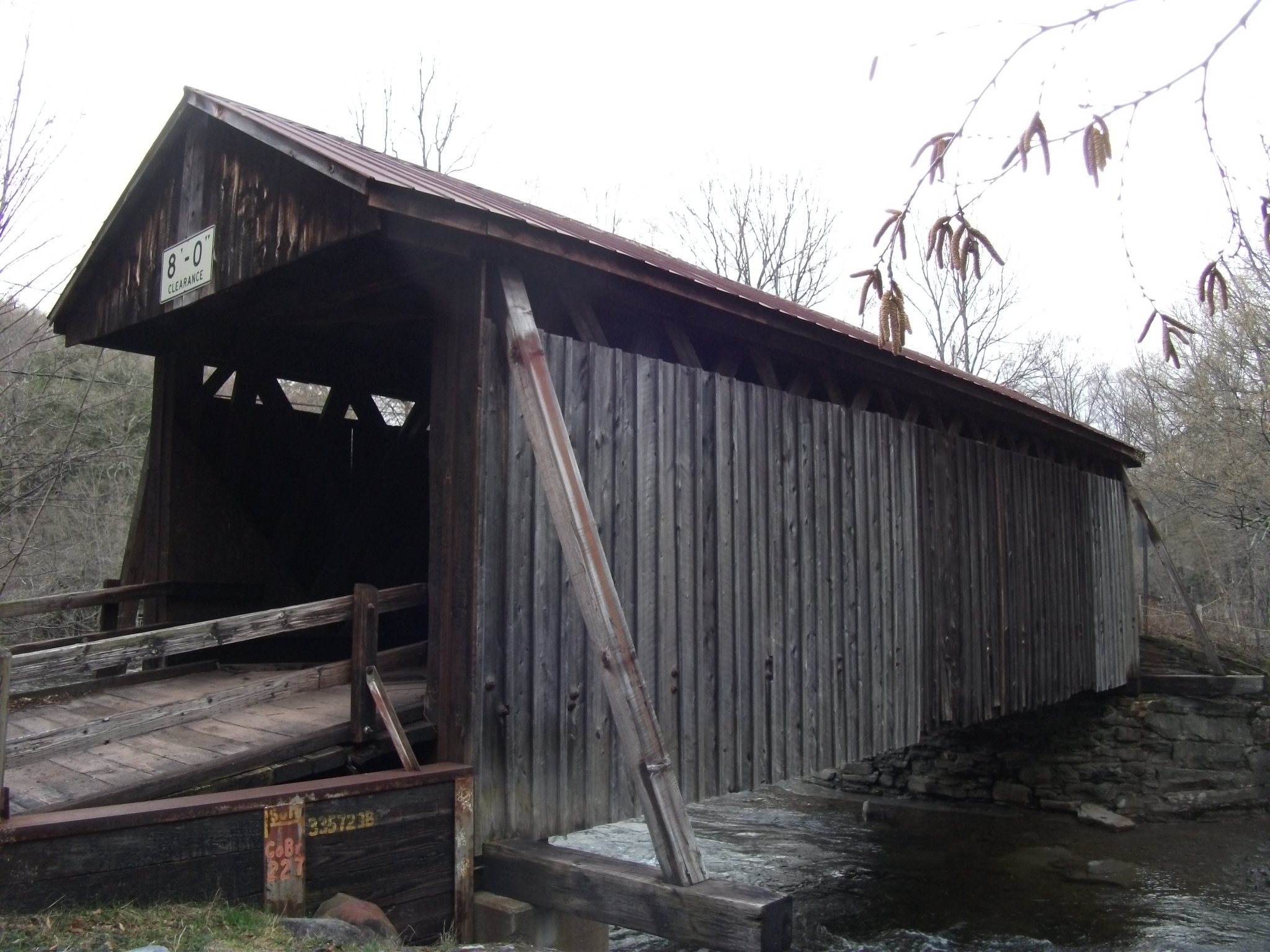
- Bendo Bridge, April 2011
- Coordinates: 41°54′24″N 74°41′58″W
- Crosses: Willowemoc Creek

History
- Construction end: 1860

Bendo Bridge is a wooden covered bridge over Willowemoc Creek in the town of Rockland, in Sullivan County, New York. This single 48 foot span Town lattice truss bridge was built by John Davidson in 1860 in Livingston Manor and then moved to its current location in 1913.

== See also ==
- List of covered bridges in New York
- Van Tran Flat Bridge
