= Hyde Hall Bridge =

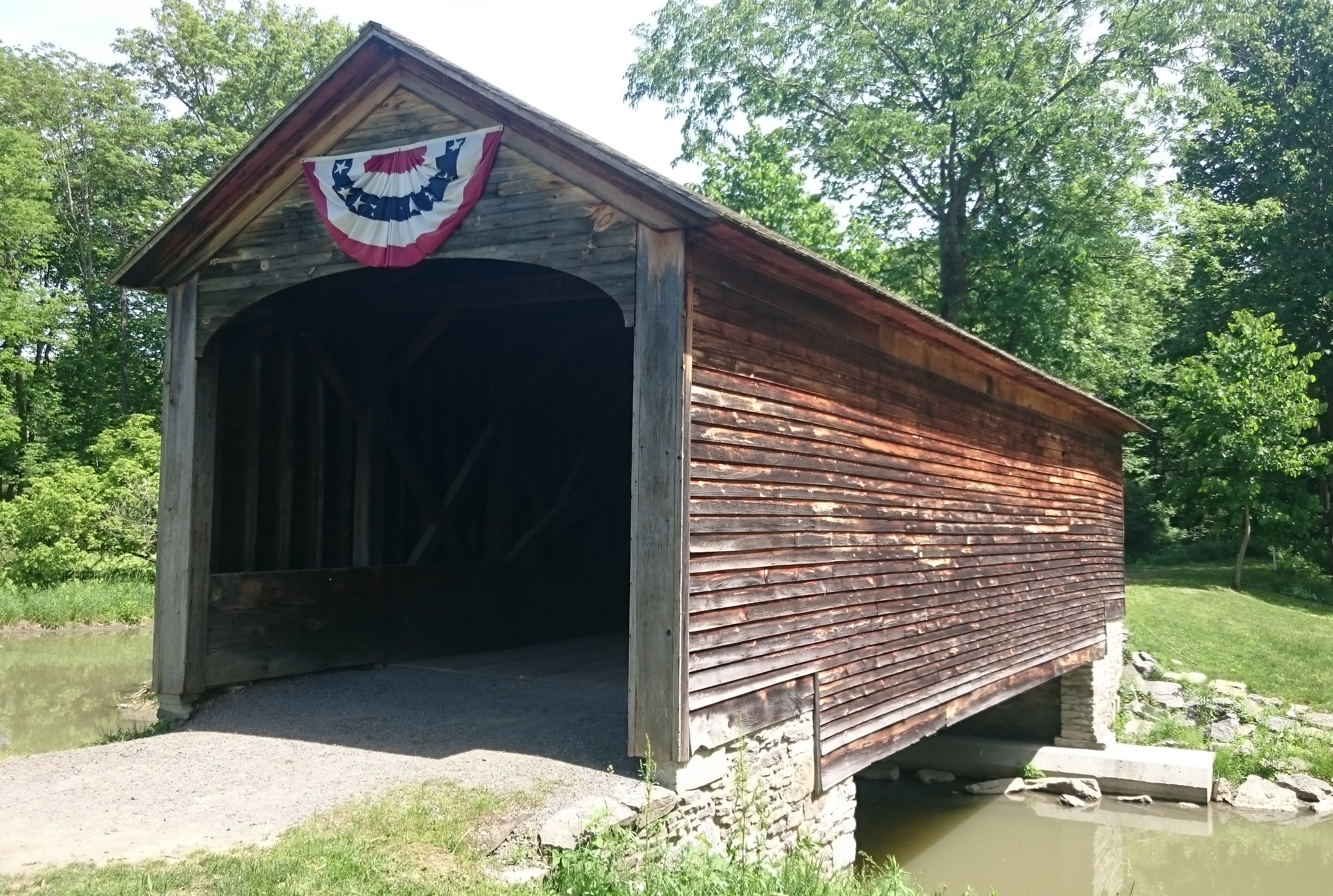
- Hyde Hall Bridge in June 2018
- Coordinates: 42°47′24″N 74°51′50″W
- Crosses: Shadow Brook

Characteristics
- Design: Burr Arch Truss
- Hyde Hall Covered Bridge
- U.S. National Register of Historic Places
- Nearest city: East Springfield, New York
- Coordinates: 42°47′25″N 74°51′49″W
- Built: 1825
- NRHP reference No.: 98001539
- Added to NRHP: December 17, 1998
- Total length: 53 feet (16 m)

Location
- Interactive map of Hyde Hall Bridge

Hyde Hall Bridge is a wooden covered bridge over Shadow Brook built in 1825, on then-private property of Hyde Hall, a country mansion. Both are now included in Glimmerglass State Park. With the possible exception of the Hassenplug Bridge in Pennsylvania (also built in 1825), it is the oldest documented, existing covered bridge in the United States. The World Guide to Covered Bridges and its entries of both the National Register of Historic Places and the Historic American Engineering Record list it as being constructed in 1825. The Historic American Buildings Survey entry for it shows an 1830 erection date.

The bridge consists of a single 53-foot (16 m) span using a Burr Arch Truss and was constructed by master carpenter Cyrenus Clark with assistance from carpenter Andrew Alden and stonemason Lorenzo Bates. Renovations to the bridge were performed by the State of New York in 1967.

It is one of 29 historic covered bridges in New York State.

== See also ==
- List of bridges documented by the Historic American Engineering Record in New York (state)
- List of covered bridges in New York
