= Halls Mills Bridge (New York) =

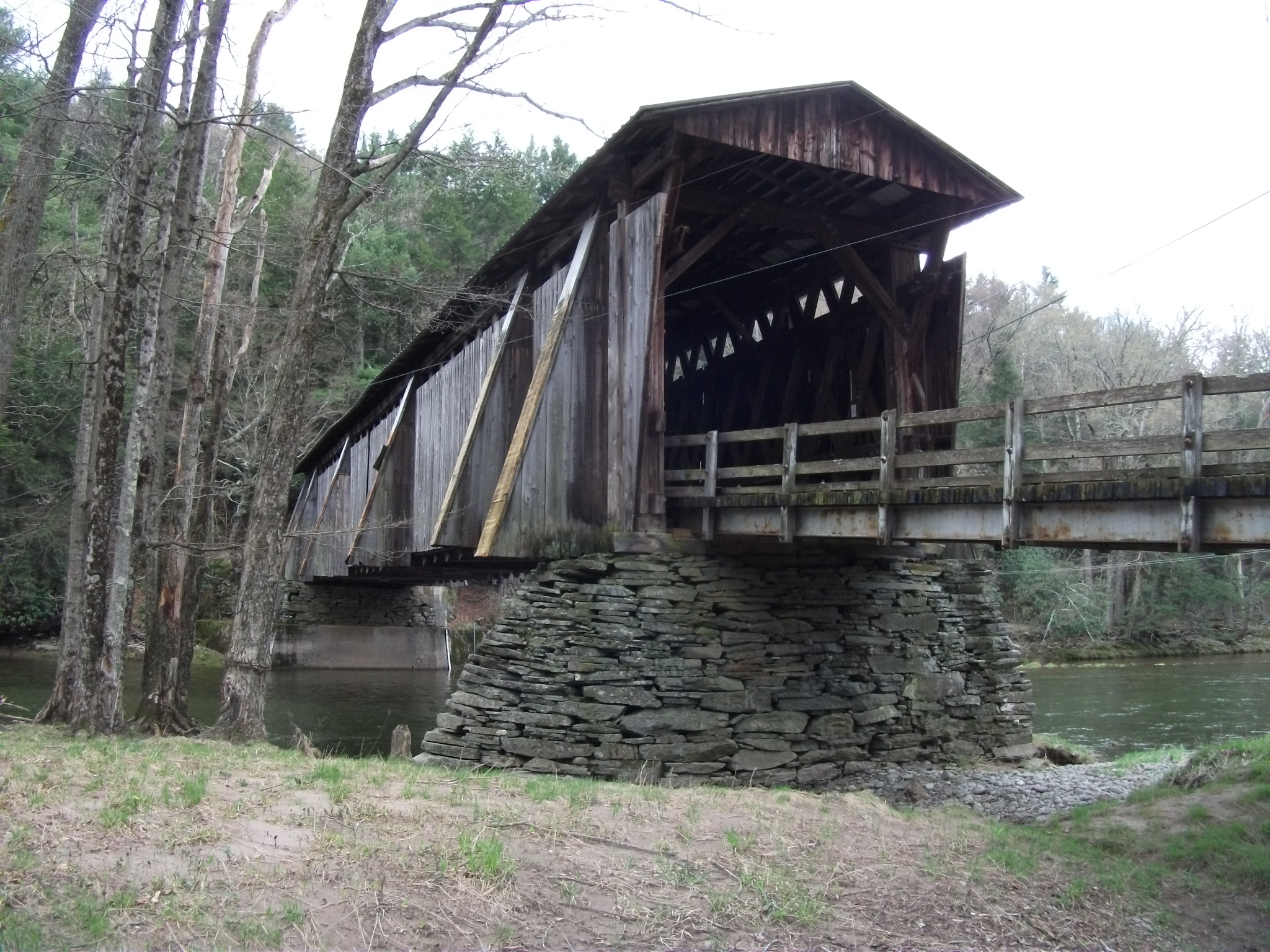
- Halls Mills Bridge in April 2011
- Coordinates: 41.890122°N 74.589851°W
- Carries: 0
- Crosses: Neversink River
- Locale: Claryville, New York
- Official name: Halls Mills Covered Bridge

Characteristics
- Design: Lattice Truss

History
- Construction start: 1906
- Construction end: 1912
- Opened: to pedestrians only
- Closed: in 1963

Statistics
- Daily traffic: 0

Halls Mills Bridge is a wooden covered bridge over the Neversink River. It is in the town of Neversink, in Sullivan County, New York, on Hunter Road. Construction began in 1906 and was completed in 1912, built by David Benton and James Knight. It is a single span of town lattice truss design. The bridge was retired from vehicle use in 1963, and was accessible to pedestrians only. It is now posted as being closed to pedestrian traffic.

One of the dry stacked stone abutments was damaged heavily during Hurricane Irene and Tropical Storm Lee in August 2011.

It is one of 22 covered bridges in New York State.
