= Christian Church (East Delhi, New York) =

Historic church in New York, United States

- U.S. National Register of Historic Places
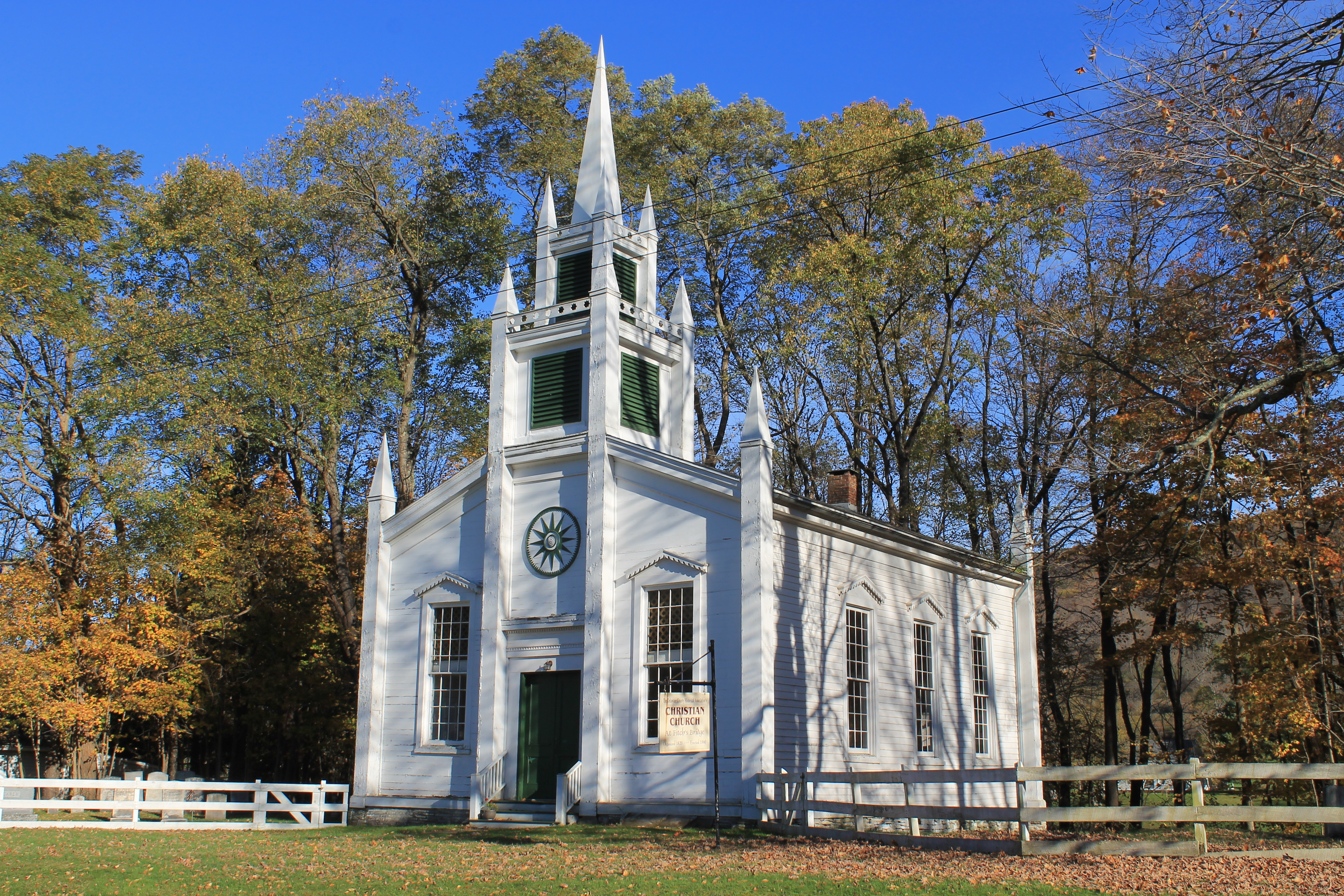
- Christian Church, East Delhi, NY

- Location within New York Location within the United States
- Location: NY 10, East Delhi, New York
- Coordinates: 42°17′56″N 74°52′45″W
- Area: less than one acre
- Built: 1861
- Architect: Adams, James
- Architectural style: Greek Revival, Gothic Revival
- NRHP reference No.: 01000250
- Added to NRHP: March 12, 2001

Christian Church, also known as Fitches Bridge Church, is a historic church on NY 10 at East Delhi in Delaware County, New York. It was built in 1861 and is in the Greek Revival style with an overlay of Gothic Revival decoration. It is a small rectangular structure of post and beam construction. It features 12 narrow, engaged towers with pinnacles that mark the corners of the building.

It was added to the National Register of Historic Places in 2001.

== See also ==
- National Register of Historic Places listings in Delaware County, New York
