= Tappan Bridge =

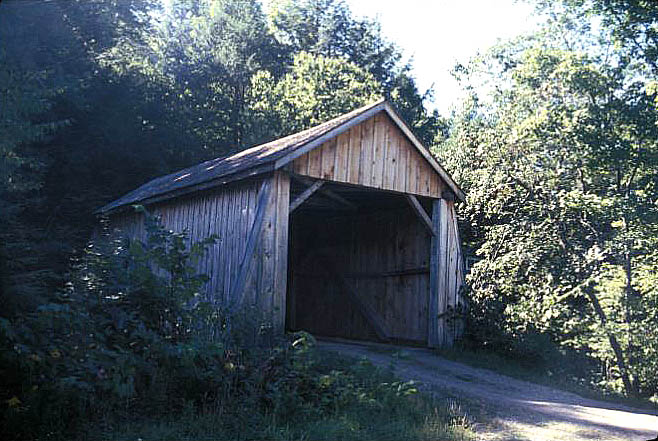
- Coordinates: 42°04′07″N 74°32′52″W
- Crosses: Dry Brook

History
- Construction end: 1906

Location
- Interactive map of Tappan Bridge

Tappan Bridge, also known as Kittle Bridge, is a wooden covered bridge in the town of Hardenburgh in Ulster County, New York.
