= Willowemoc Creek =

Coordinates: 41.9131°N 74.7364°W

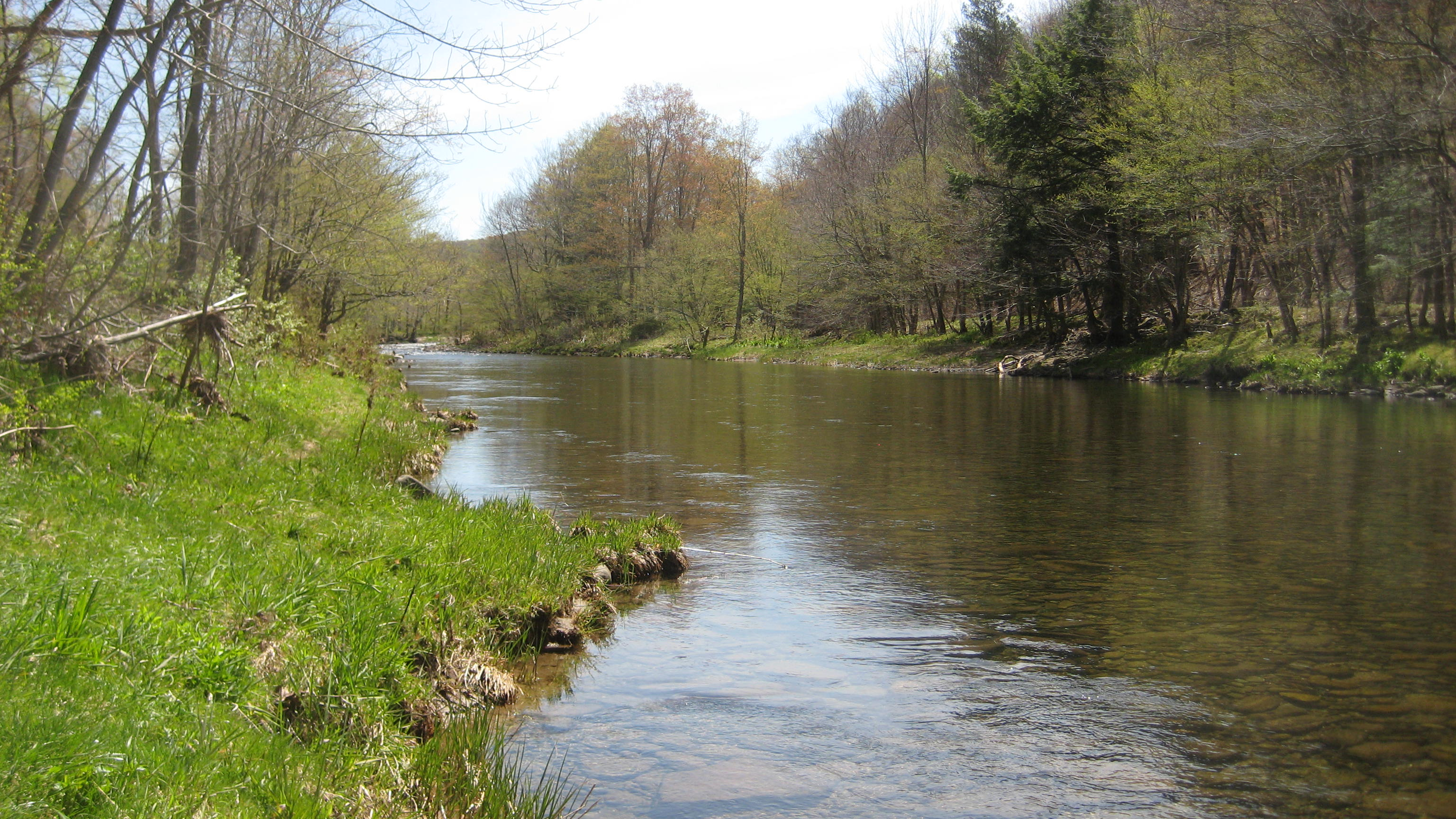
- Willowemoc Creek just east of Livingston Manor, New York, looking upstream.

Location
- Country: United States
- State: New York

Physical characteristics
- Mouth: Beaver Kill
  - location: Delaware County, New York, United States

Willowemoc Creek is a tributary of Beaver Kill. It is a popular trout fishing stream near the Catskill Park in Sullivan County, New York.

== Course ==
The Willowemoc is 27 miles (43 km) long, and flows almost directly west from a few miles due north of the hamlet of Willowemoc, through Livingston Manor to Roscoe, where it joins the Beaver Kill at the Junction Pool, noted for trout fishing. It has many tributaries that flow into it from both the north and south. Going from east to west, from the source to the outlet at the Beaver Kill, these are: Butternut Brook and Fir Brook; Fall Brook (at Willowemoc), Hunter Brook (from Hunter Lake), Mongaup Creek (at Debruce), Little Beaver Kill and Cattail Brook (at Livingston Manor), Bascom Brook, and Hazel Brook and Stewart Brook, just east of Roscoe. The creek is spanned by two historic covered bridges: the Bendo Bridge and the Van Tran Flat Bridge.

== Fishing ==
Large sections of the Willowemoc are open to public fishing. It is an especially popular and picturesque fly fishing stream. The Catskill Fly Fishing Center and Museum is on the Willowemoc, not far from Livingston Manor, on old Route 17. Brown trout are stocked from the Catskill Mountain Fish Hatchery located a few miles north of Debruce. Brook trout thrive in the upper reaches of the stream. Rainbow trout do not fare as well. The lower part of the Creek, between Livingston Manor and Roscoe, is paralleled by New York State Route 17, from which exceptional views of the Catskill Mountains can be seen. This part of the Willowemoc becomes 40 to 100 feet wide, with many pools three to five feet deep. The opening day for trout fishing is April 1.

== Designations ==
The creek has been spelled many ways over the years: Weelewaughmack, Weelewaughwemack, Willikwernock, Willerwhemack, Willowwemoc, Williwemock, and so on. The name is derived from a Lenape language term. Fishermen sometimes just call it the Willow.

== See also ==
- List of New York rivers
