= Hassenplug Bridge =

- U.S. National Register of Historic Places
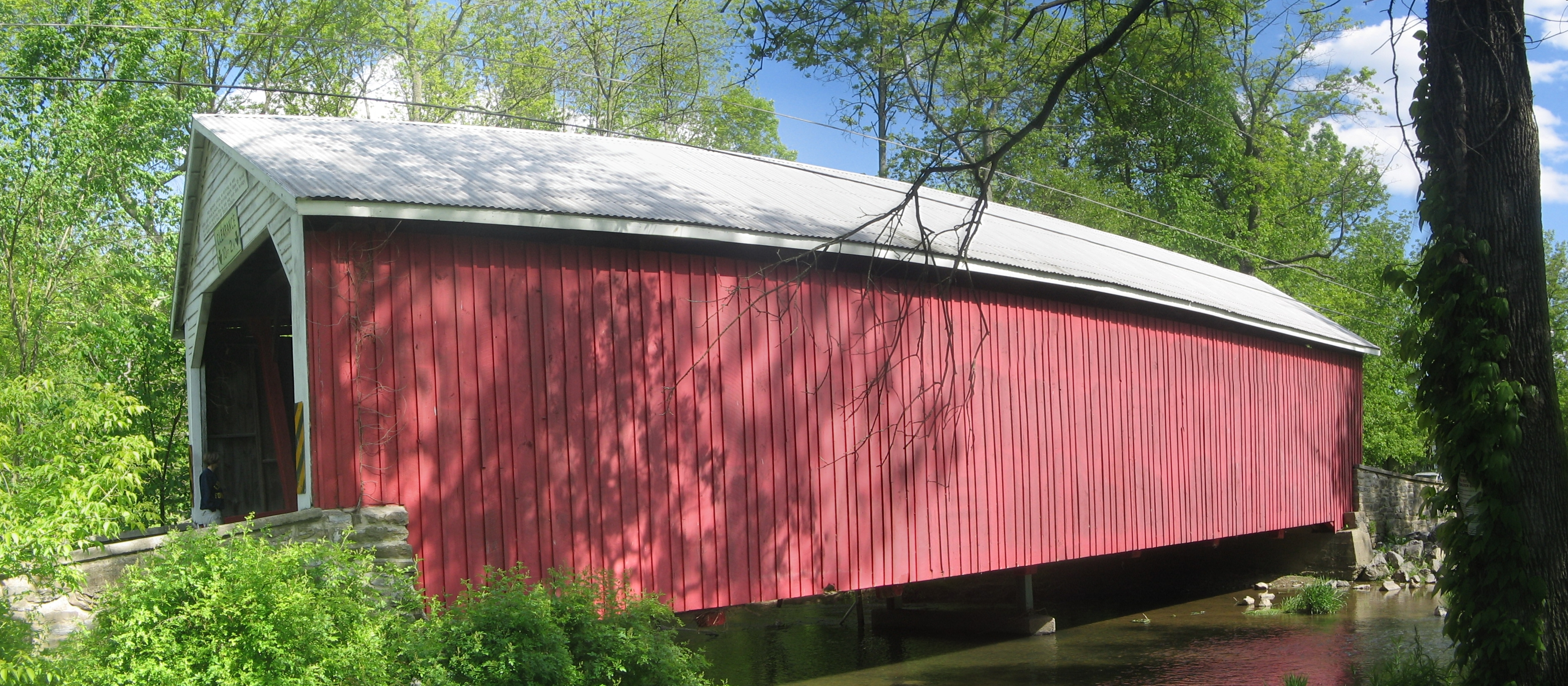
- Hassenplug Covered Bridge, April 2010

- Location within Pennsylvania Location within the United States
- Location: N. 4th St., Mifflinburg, Pennsylvania
- Coordinates: 40°55′25″N 77°3′0″W
- Area: 0.1 acres (0.040 ha)
- Built: 1825
- Architectural style: Burr Truss
- MPS: Union County Covered Bridges TR
- NRHP reference No.: 80003641
- Added to NRHP: February 8, 1980

The Hassenplug Bridge is a historic wooden covered bridge which is located in Mifflinburg, Union County, Pennsylvania.

The oldest covered bridge in the Commonwealth of Pennsylvania (the American state with the most covered bridges), it is also purportedly the oldest covered bridge in the United States, and was listed on the National Register of Historic Places in 1980.

== History and architectural features ==
This historic structure is an 80-foot-long (24 m), Burr Truss bridge, which was erected in 1825 and overhauled in 1959. It was then restored again in 2022, a reconstruction effort which, once again, replaced the 1959 steel grate floor with historically authentic, wide, wood planks.

This covered bridge crosses the west or south branch of Buffalo Creek, and was named for the Hassenplug family of the early nineteenth century who lived in the brick homestead that is located on the north side of the bridge. The Hassenplugs were well known locally for their production of German beer.

It is the oldest covered bridge in Pennsylvania, and is purportedly the oldest covered bridge in the United States. However, this distinction is also claimed for the Hyde Hall Bridge in New York.
