= Roydhouse Bridge =

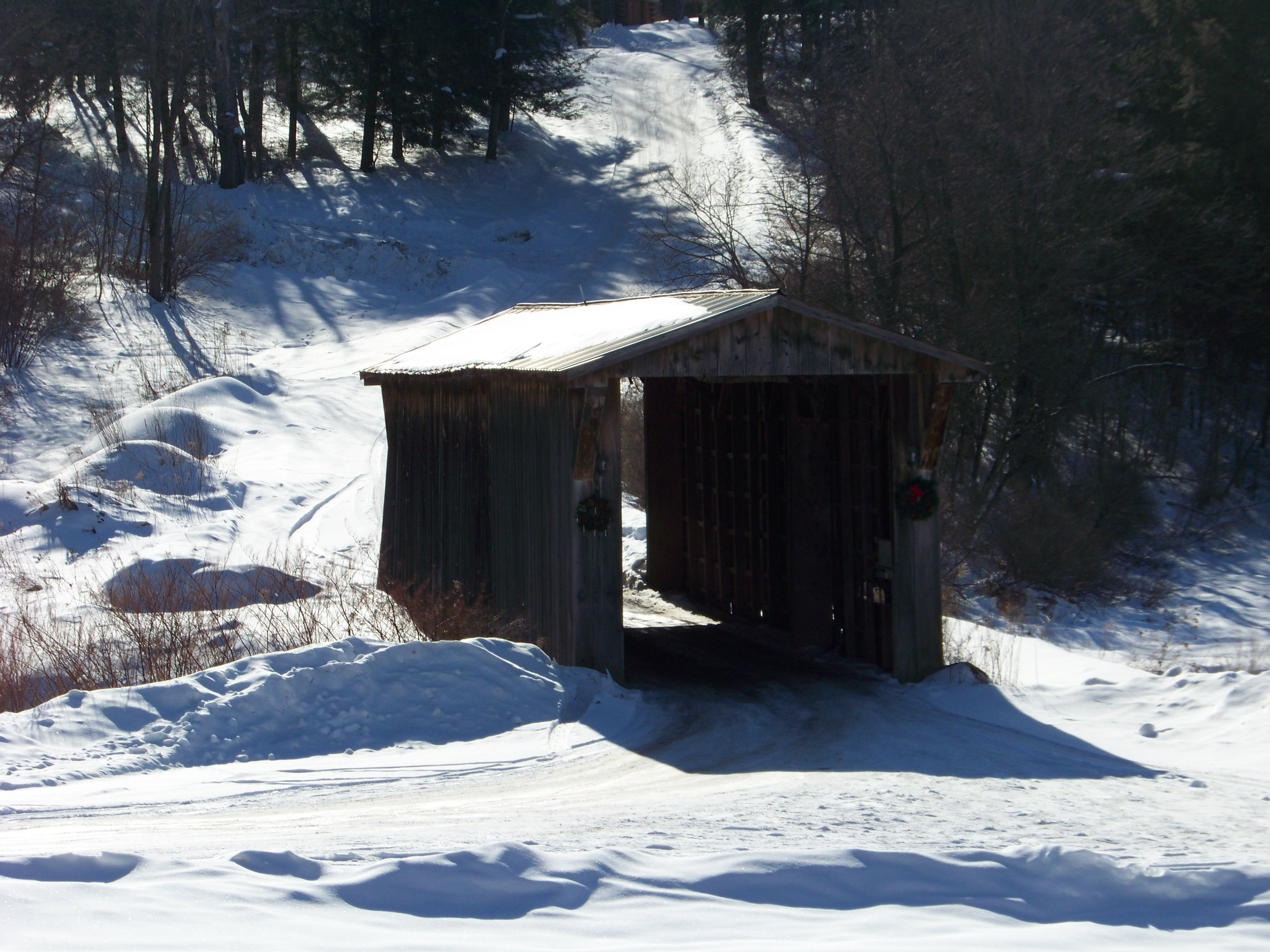
- Roydhouse Bridge over Beaver Creek as photographed January 2010
- Coordinates: 42°53′43.74″N 75°18′2.45″W
- Carries: Vehicles or foot traffic
- Crosses: Beaver Creek

Characteristics
- Design: Steel stringer
- Total length: 58 feet

Roydhouse Bridge is a covered bridge in the Oneida County, New York town of Bridgewater, just off US Route 20 on Doe Road. It is a steel stringer bridge over Beaver Creek.
