= Forge Bridge =

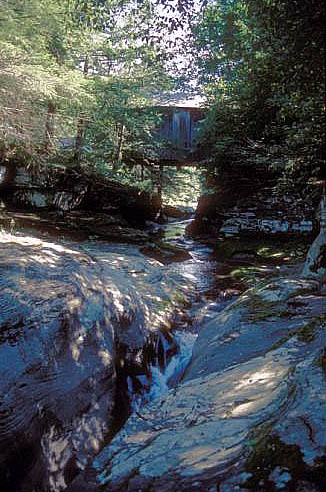
- Coordinates: 42°04′45″N 74°33′09″W
- Crosses: Dry Brook

Characteristics
- Total length: 27 ft (8.2 m)

History
- Opened: 1906

Forge Bridge is a wooden covered bridge in the town of Hardenburgh in Ulster County, New York. It was originally built in 1906 and has a single span of 27 ft (8.2 m).
