= East Springfield, New York =

- hamlet
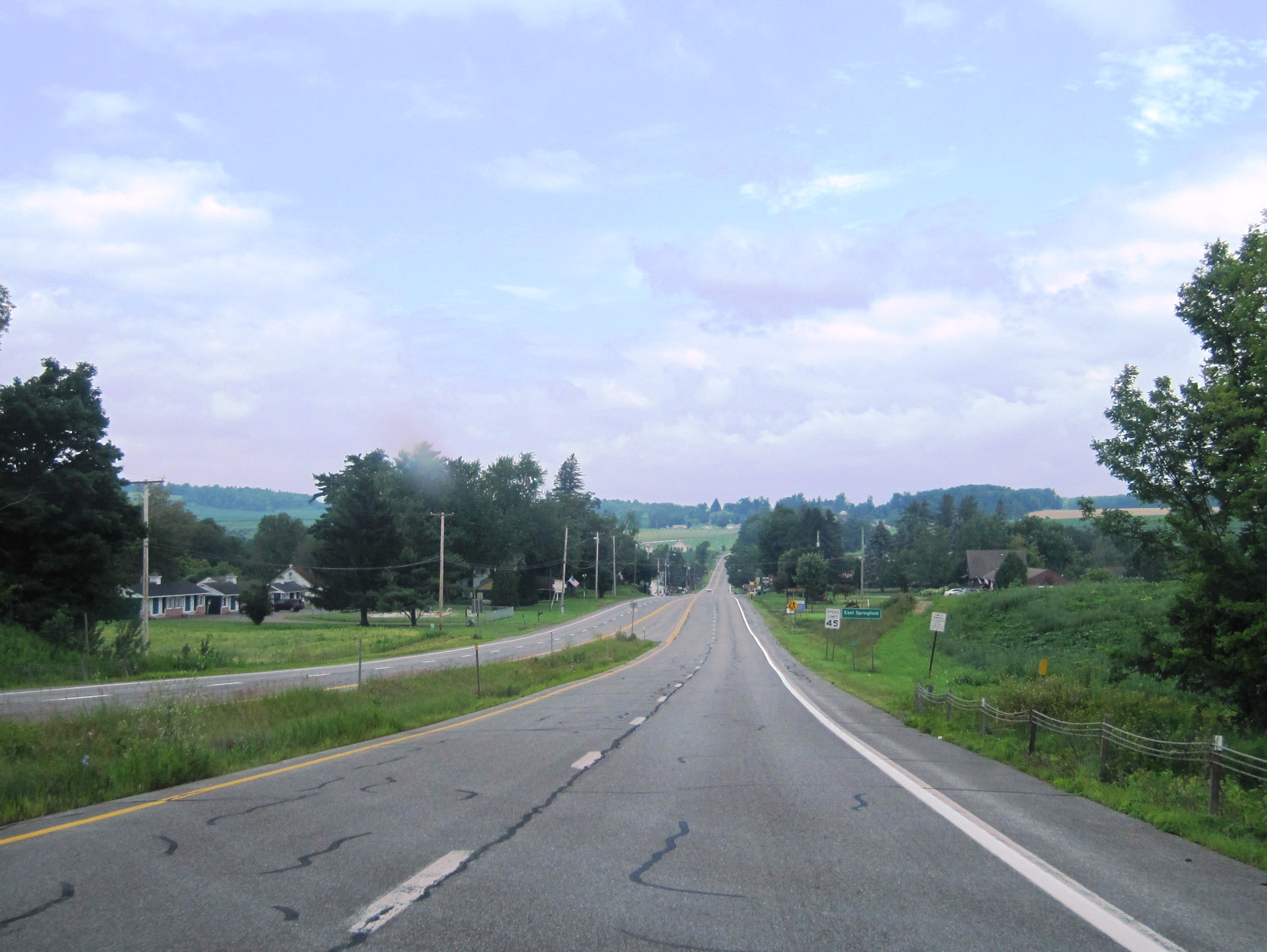
- US 20 westbound entering East Springfield

- Location within New York
- Coordinates: 42°49′51″N 74°48′55″W
- Country: United States
- State: New York
- County: Otsego
- Town: Springfield
- Elevation: 1,322 ft (403 m)
- Time zone: UTC-5 (Eastern (EST))
  - Summer (DST): UTC-4 (EDT)
- ZIP code: 13333
- Area code: 607
- GNIS feature ID: 949248

East Springfield is a hamlet in the town of Springfield, Otsego County, New York, United States. The zipcode is: 13333. According to the 2010 US census, The location of East Springfield had a population of 62.
