= Copeland Bridge =

Copeland Covered Bridge
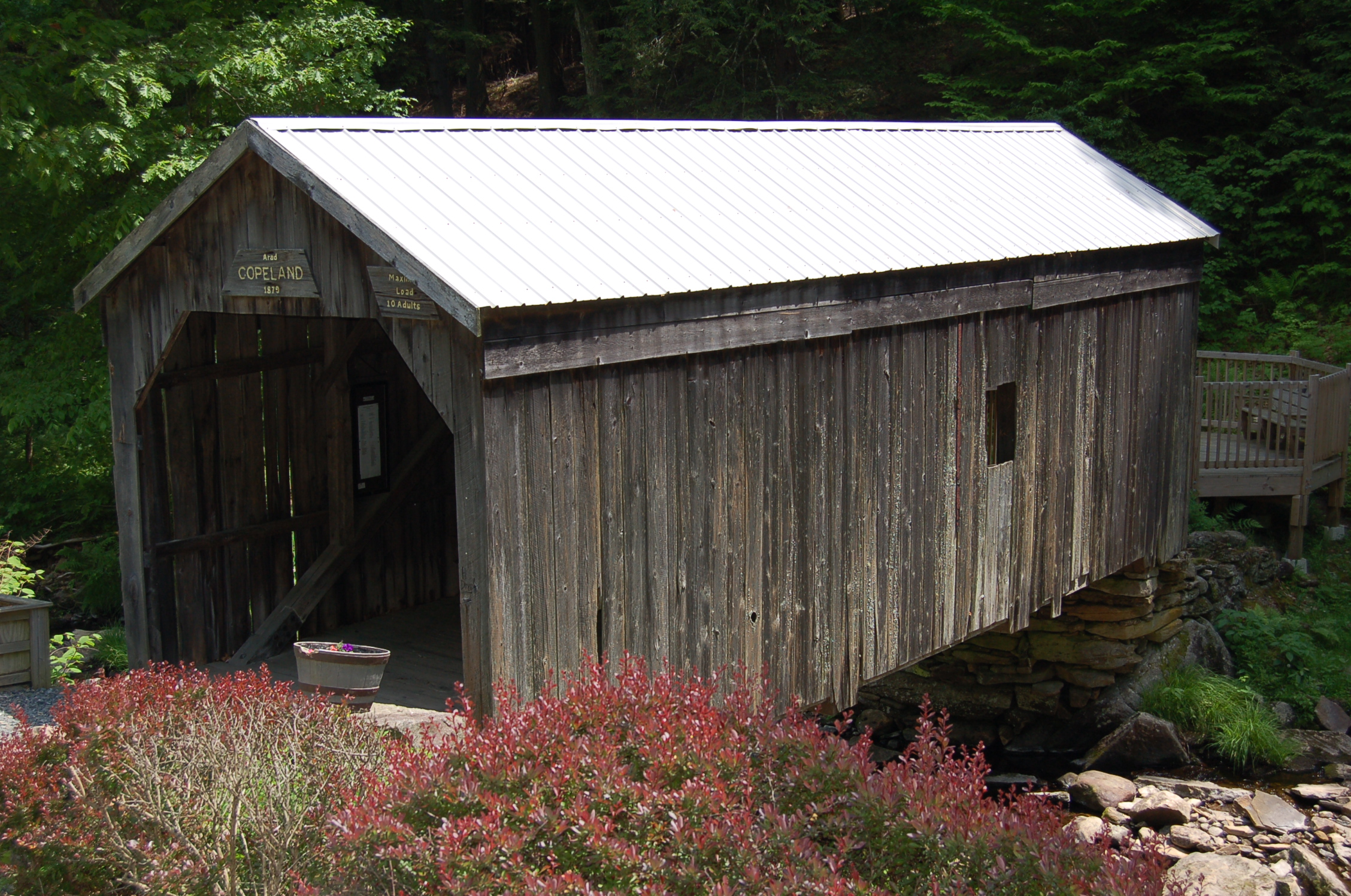
- Coordinates: 43°13′16″N 74°06′04″W
- Crosses: Beecher Creek
- Copeland Covered Bridge
- U.S. National Register of Historic Places
- Location: North Shore Road, over Beecher Circle, Edinburg, New York
- Coordinates: 43°13′15″N 74°6′2″W
- Area: 1 acre (0.40 ha)
- Built: 1879
- Built by: Copeland, Arad
- NRHP reference No.: 98000998
- Added to NRHP: August 6, 1998

Location
- Interactive map of Copeland Covered Bridge

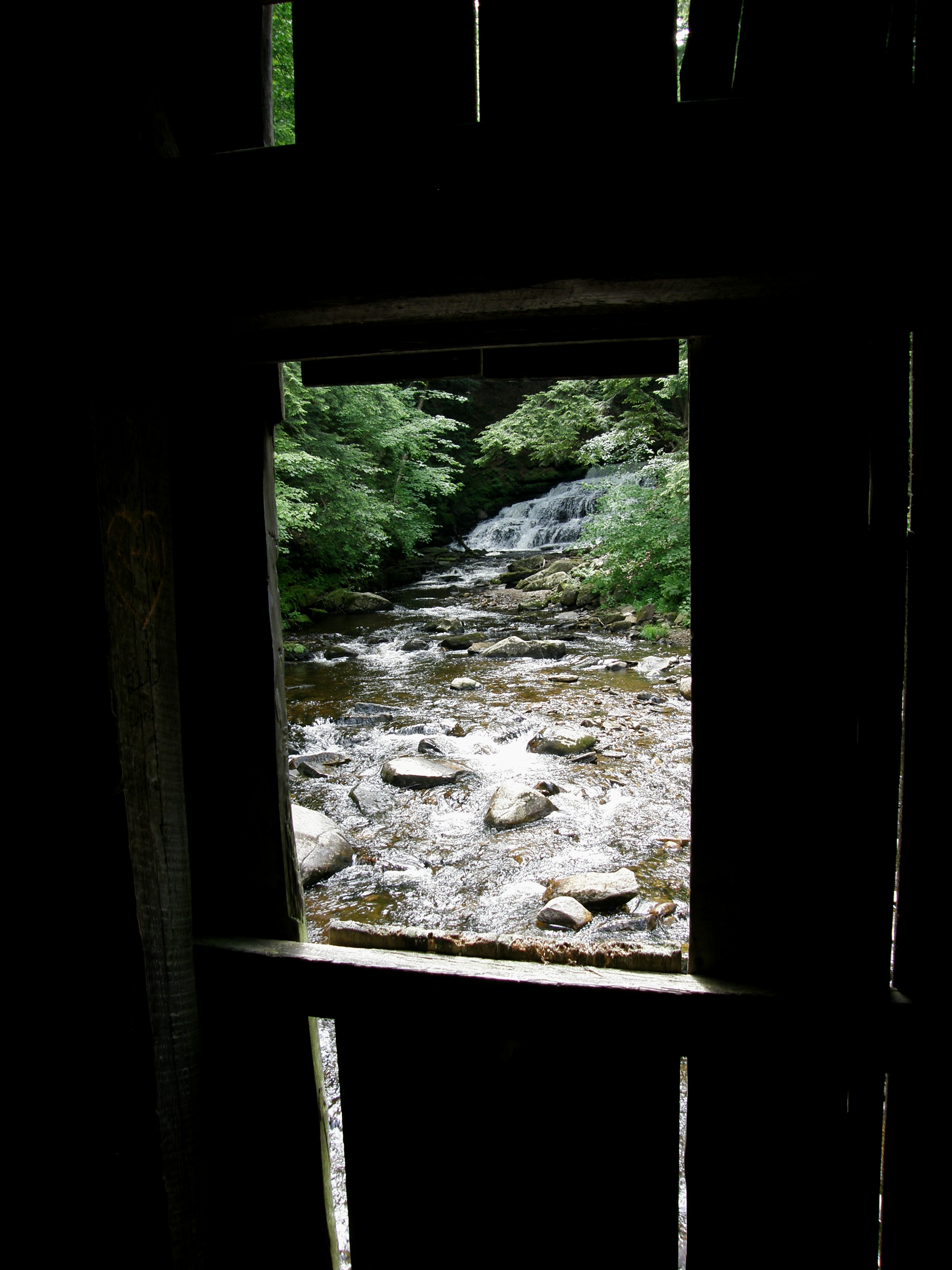
View from inside the Copeland Covered Bridge

Copeland Bridge, also known as Copeland Farm Bridge or Copeland Covered Bridge, is a wooden covered bridge over Beecher Creek in the town of Edinburg in Saratoga County, New York. It was built in 1879, and is a small, timber framed, queenpost truss bridge with a gable roof. It has a 30-foot span carried on fieldstone abutments.

It was listed on the National Register of Historic Places in 1998.
