= Eagleville Bridge =

- Coordinates: 43°5′0″N 73°18′51″W
- Crosses: Battenkill
- Eagleville Covered Bridge
- U.S. National Register of Historic Places
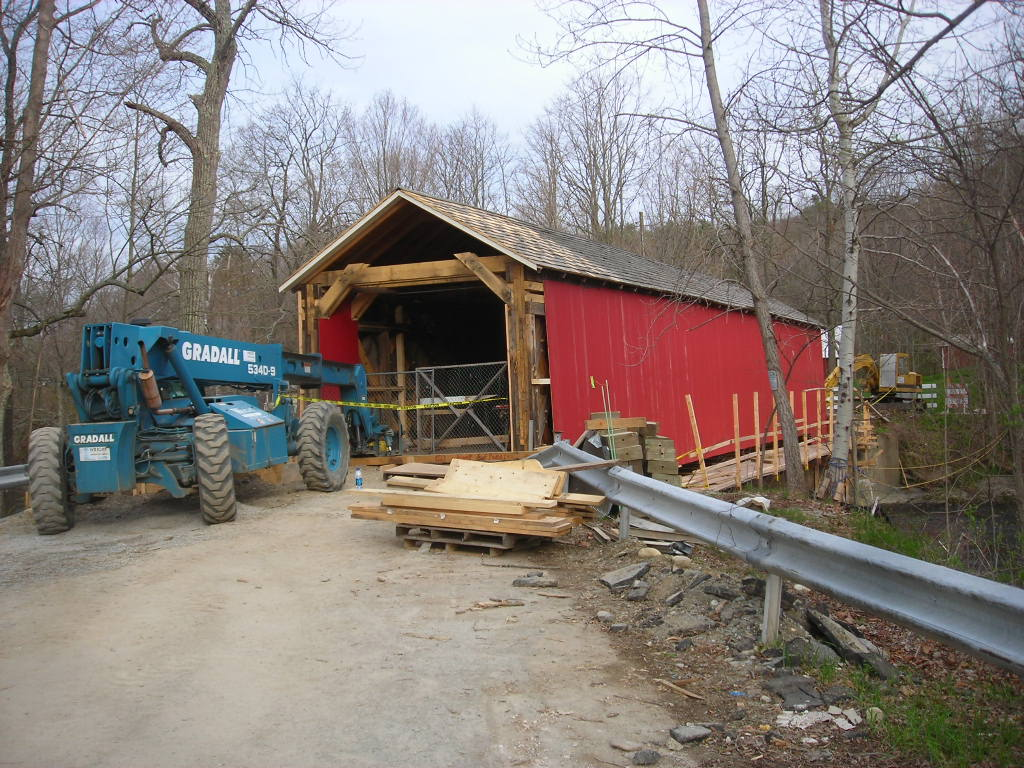
- Eagleville Covered Bridge, May 2007

- Location within New York Location within the United States
- Location: Spans Batten Kill off NY 313, Eagleville in the Towns of Jackson and Salem, New York
- Coordinates: 43°5′0″N 73°18′51″W
- Area: 1 acre (0.40 ha)
- Built: 1858
- Architect: Clapp, Ephraim
- Architectural style: Town lattice plank truss
- MPS: Covered Bridges of Washington County TR / Buskirk, Rexleigh, Eagleville, and Shushan Covered Bridges
- NRHP reference No.: 78003458
- Added to NRHP: March 8, 1978

Location
- Interactive map of Eagleville Bridge

Eagleville Bridge is a covered bridge located at Eagleville in the towns of Jackson and Salem, Washington County, New York. The bridge, which crosses the Battenkill, is one of 29 historic covered bridges in New York State.

It was built by local builder Ephraim Clapp in 1858.

Town and Howe truss designs were patented by Ithiel Town in 1820 and William Howe (architect) in 1840, respectively. The Eagleville Bridge employs "the patented Town lattice truss, consisting of top and bottom chords of laminated wood plank, and a web of diagonal wood planks connected by wood trunnels at each point of intersection".

It is one of four Washington County covered bridges submitted for listing in the National Register of Historic Places in one multiple property submission. The others are the Buskirk Bridge, the Rexleigh Bridge, and Shushan Bridge. All four were listed on the National Register of Historic Places on March 8, 1972.

The Eagleville bridge was damaged by a flood in 1977 but was "stabilized and returned to vehicular use".
