= Shushan (disambiguation) =

Shushan is a city in the Khuzestan province of Iran.

Shushan may also refer to:

- Shushan Airport, former name of New Orleans Lakefront Airport
- Shushan District, a district in Hefei, Anhui, China
- Shushan, New York, United States
- The lower, outer gate of the second Temple in Jerusalem

== People with the surname ==
- Amit Ben Shushan (born 1985), Israeli football player
- John IX bar Shushan (11th century), Syriac Orthodox Patriarch of Antioch
- Naji Shushan (born 1981), Libyan football defender

== See also ==
- Shushan Bridge
