= Sheldon Farms =

Family farm in Salem, New York, U.S.

Coordinates: 43°9′34″N 73°20′17″W

Sheldon Farms is a family farm in the Batten Kill Valley region of New York situated in Washington County in the town of Salem. The sixth-generation farm has been in operation since 1845. The farm is 600 acres (2.4 km^{2}) in size situated on the Battenkill River and White Creek which are rich in minerals which contribute to the terroir of their produce. The farm utilizes 250 acres (1.0 km^{2}) of its land for production.

The farm is known for its heirloom vegetables including the Green Mountain potato, Ozette Potato, Radiator Charlie's Mortgage Lifter tomato, and Aunt Molly's Husk tomato (aka Ground Cherry). They also produce the hybrid potato varieties Adirondack Red potato, Adirondack Blue potato developed by Cornell University. The Sheldon family opened a market at their farm in 1999 and introduced green beans, peas, zucchini and summer squashes, varietal eggplant, pumpkins, winter squash, Brussels sprouts, kale, tomatillos, and edible flowers to their production mix. In the spring the farm also produces maple syrup.

Sheldon Farms is a member of the Saratoga Farmers' Market Association, Pride of New York, and Slow Food USA.
