= Eli Waste =

American politician

Eli Waste (July 27, 1827 – August 14, 1894) was an American farmer and politician.

Born in the town of Salem, Washington County, New York, Waste moved to the town of Lyndon, Sheboygan County, Wisconsin Territory in 1847 and then to the town of Sparta, Monroe County, Wisconsin in 1850. Waste was a farmer. He served as Monroe County treasurer and as county judge. In 1874, 1875, and 1880, Waste served in the Wisconsin State Assembly as a Republican. In 1880, Waste moved to Antigo, Wisconsin and he died there in 1894.
