= Martin–Fitch House and Asa Fitch Jr. Laboratory =

Historic house in New York, United States

- U.S. National Register of Historic Places
- Location within New York Location within the United States
- Location: 4183 NY 29, Salem, New York
- Coordinates: 43°09′05″N 73°22′55″W
- Area: 9.01 acres (3.65 ha)
- Built: c. 1787, c. 1796-1812, c. 1825, c. 1830, c. 1900
- Architectural style: Georgian
- NRHP reference No.: 14000290
- Added to NRHP: June 9, 2014

Martin–Fitch House and Asa Fitch Jr. Laboratory, also known as the Fitch House, is a historic home and laboratory located at Salem, Washington County, New York. The house was built about 1787, and modified between about 1796 and 1812, and again about 1830. It is a two-story, five-bay, Late Georgian style heavy timber frame dwelling. It has a steep hipped slate roof with dormers and two interior chimneys. The Asa Fitch, Jr. Laboratory, or “Bug House,” was built about 1825 and enlarged about 1860. It is a small two-story, gable roofed frame rectangular building with a lean-to addition. Also on the property are the contributing barn (c. 1825 and later) and milk house (c. 1900). It was the home and laboratory of Asa Fitch (1809-1879), first occupational entomologist in the U.S.

It was added to the National Register of Historic Places in 2014.
