= Buskirk Bridge =

- Buskirk Covered Bridge
- U.S. National Register of Historic Places
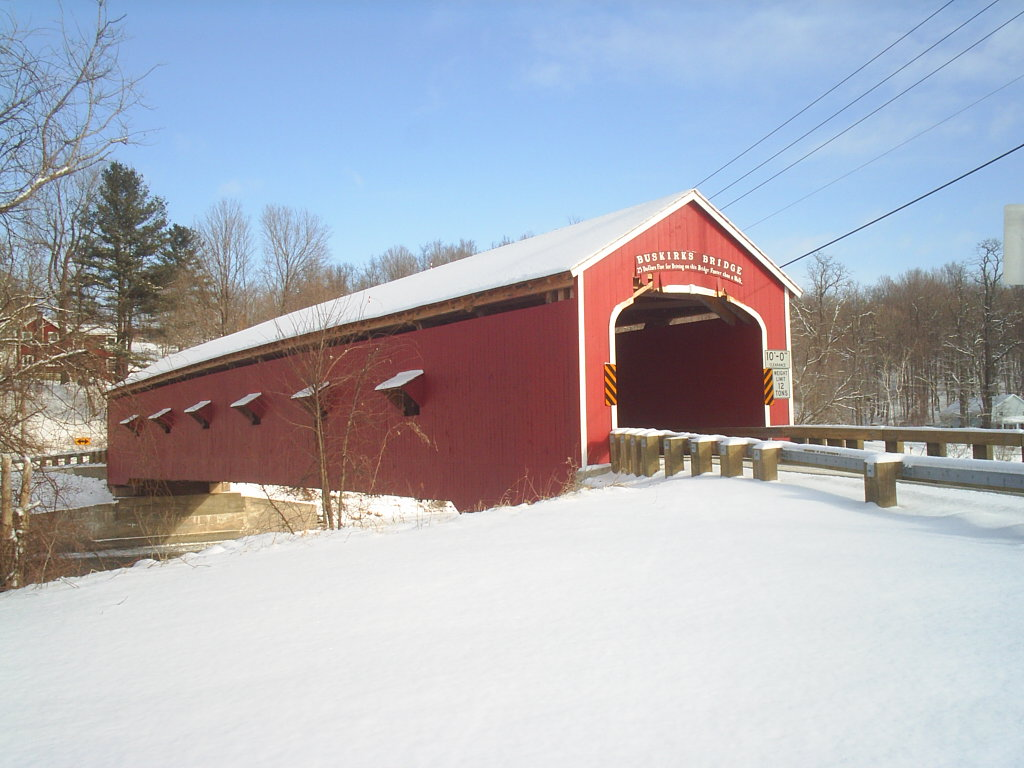
- Buskirk Bridge from the Rensselaer County side of the Hoosic River

- Location within New York Location within the United States
- Nearest city: Buskirk, New York
- Coordinates: 42°57′30″N 73°26′0″W
- Area: 1 acre (0.40 ha)
- Built: 1850
- Architectural style: Howe truss
- MPS: Covered Bridges of Washington County TR / Buskirk, Rexleigh, Eagleville, and Shushan Covered Bridges
- NRHP reference No.: 78003457
- Added to NRHP: March 08, 1978

Buskirk Bridge is a wooden covered bridge that connects Washington County, New York on the north end to Rensselaer County on the south end and like the connecting roads and the fire station just south of it, is named after the hamlet on Rensselaer side at the junction of New York State Route 67. The bridge, which crosses the Hoosic River is one of 29 historic covered bridges in New York State. The bridge, service roads and hamlet all take their names from the local Van Buskirk family.

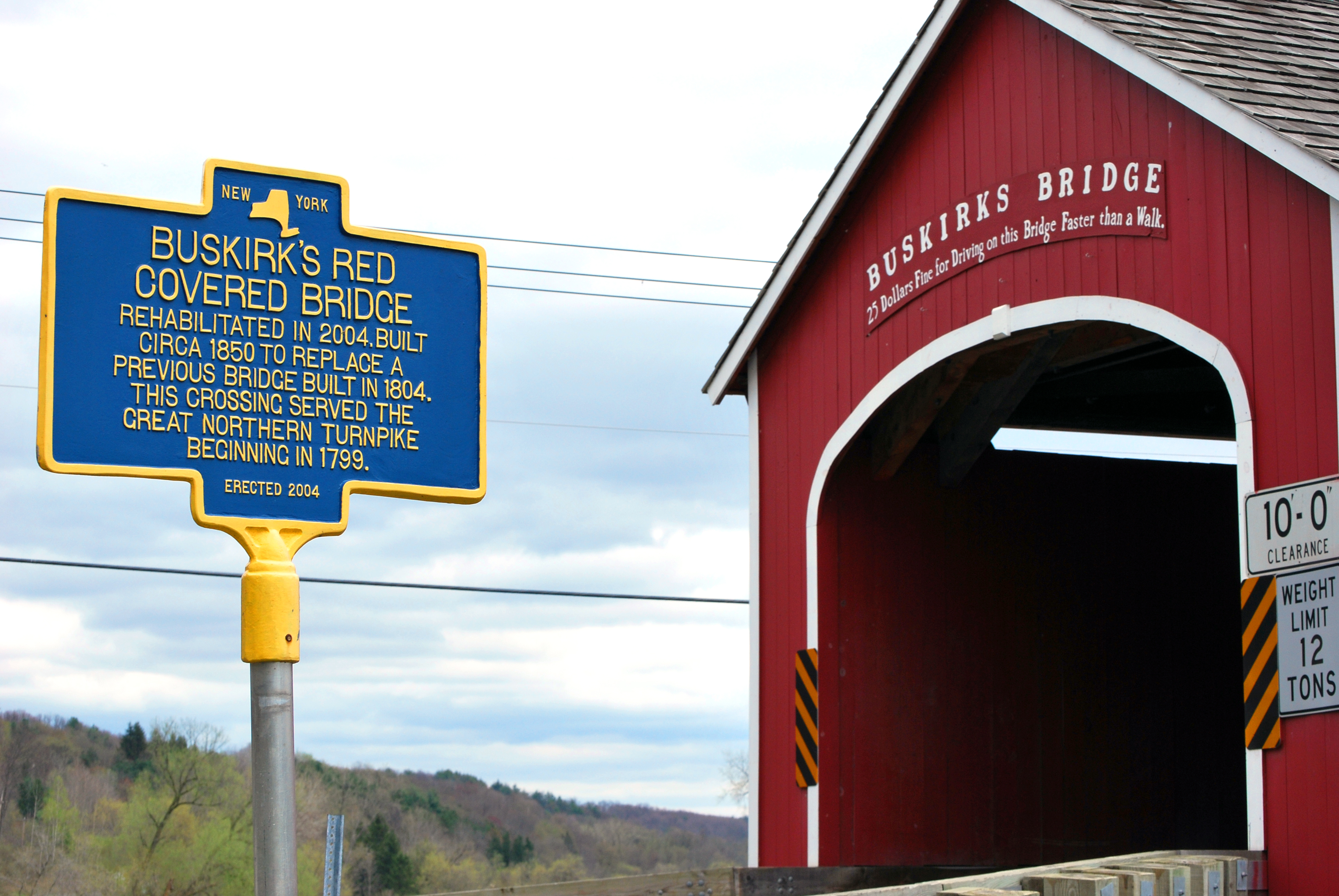
A marker on the north side commemorates the old Cambridge Turnpike, which follows Stage Road near the north entrance to Turnpike Road where another turnpike marker is located at the site of the Checkered House in Cambridge, New York, a landmark dating from the Revolutionary War period.

Town and Howe truss designs were patented by Ithiel Town in 1820 and William Howe in 1840, respectively. The Buskirk Bridge a Howe truss design, and was built to replace a previous Burr arch truss. It is perhaps the earliest Howe truss bridge that survives in New York State.

A topographic map of its location appears in its individual inventory document prepared by the New York State Office of Parks, Recreation and Historic Preservation in 1977.

It is one of four Washington County covered bridges that was submitted for listing in the National Register of Historic Places in a multiple property submission. The others are the Rexleigh Bridge, the Eagleville Bridge, and Shushan Bridge. All four were listed on the National Register of Historic Places on March 8, 1972.

The bridge continues in use for vehicles, and is maintained jointly by Washington County and Rensselaer County.
