= Maxwell Farm =

- U.S. National Register of Historic Places
- Location within New York Location within the United States
- Location: 311 County Rd. 61, Jackson, New York
- Coordinates: 43°06′19″N 73°24′13″W
- Area: 101.19 acres (40.95 ha)
- Built: c. 1815, c. 1850
- Architectural style: Greek Revival
- NRHP reference No.: 12000368
- Added to NRHP: June 27, 2012

Maxwell Farm, also known as the O'Donnell-Hill Farm, is a historic home and farm located at Jackson, Washington County, New York. The house was built about 1815, and expanded and updated about 1850 in the Greek Revival style. It is a two-story, five-bay, heavy timber frame dwelling with a rear ell. Also on the property are the contributing main barn (c. 1790 and later), corn crib (c. 1815), secondary barn (c. 1850), east barn (c. 1850 and later), milk house (c. 1920), garage (c. 1920), and well and hand pump.

It was added to the National Register of Historic Places in 2012.
