= Salem, New York =

Salem
- Town
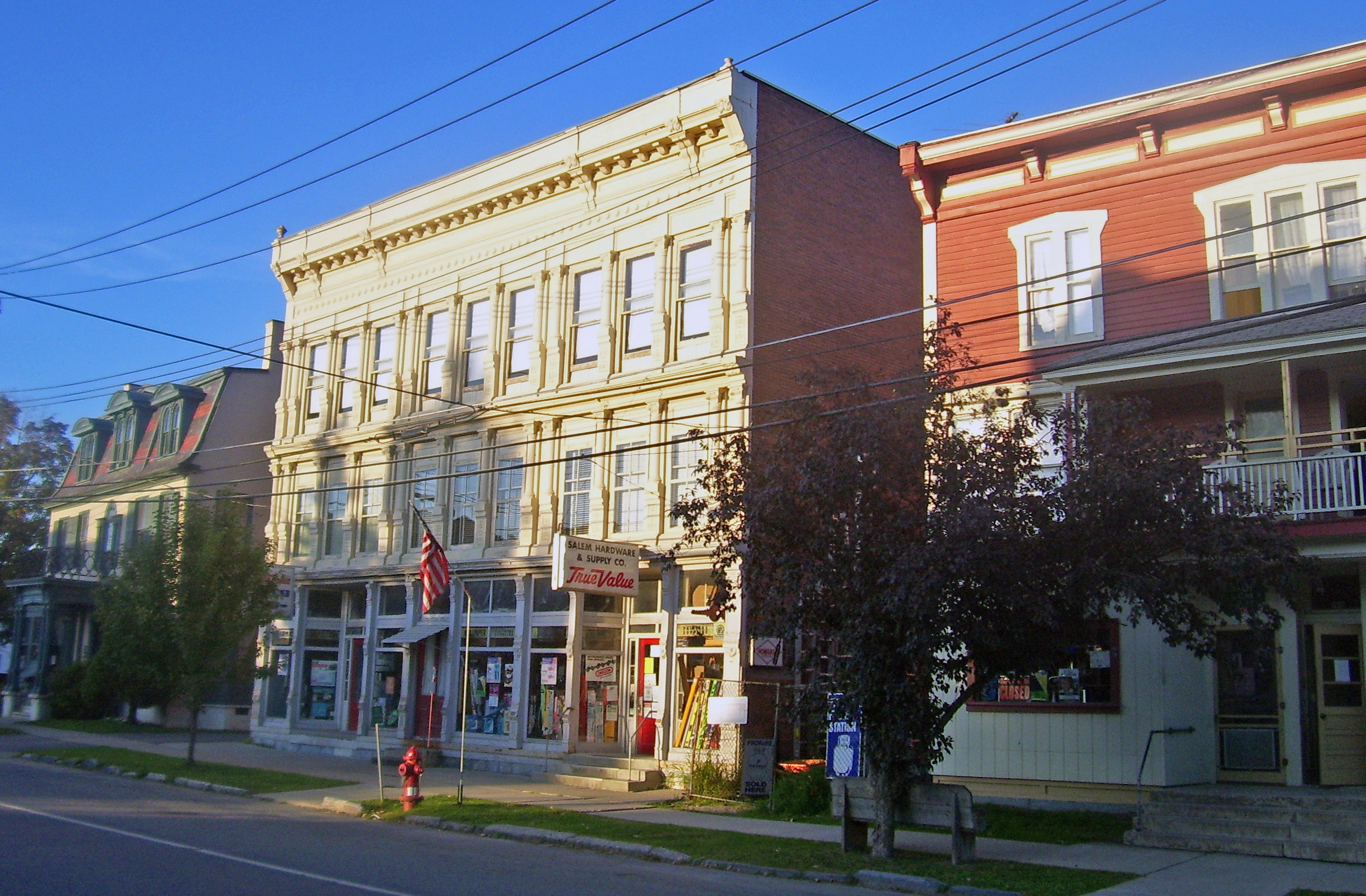
- Main Street

- Location of Salem in Washington County (left) and of Washington County in New York state (right)
- Coordinates: 43°9′N 73°19′W
- Country: United States
- State: New York
- County: Washington

Area
  - Total: 52.42 sq mi (135.77 km^{2})
  - Land: 52.36 sq mi (135.62 km^{2})
  - Water: 0.058 sq mi (0.15 km^{2})

Population (2020)
  - Total: 2,612
  - Density: 49.88/sq mi (19.26/km^{2})
- ZIP codes: 12865 (primary): 12823 Cossayuna; 12873 Shushan
- Area code: 518
- FIPS code: 36-115-64782

Salem is a town in eastern Washington County, New York, United States. It is part of the Glens Falls Metropolitan Statistical Area. The town population was 2,612 at the 2020 census. The town of Salem contains a hamlet also named Salem, formerly an incorporated village.

== History ==
Perspective map of Salem and list of landmarks from 1889 by L.R. Burleigh and inset depiction of Salem in 1789 by St John Honeywood

Salem was first settled in 1761 by Joshua Conkey and James Turner, who as soldiers in the French and Indian War, passed through the territory. In 1764, Alexander and James Turner acquired a patent which was soon divided up between the New Englanders from Pelham, Massachusetts and a group of Scotch-Irish Presbyterians, led by Dr Thomas Clark from Ballybay, County Monaghan, Ireland.

The Charlotte County and White Creek militia used Salem as its base in 1776.

The 123rd Volunteer Regiment was recruited from Salem during the Civil War.

The Alexander McNish House was added to the National Register of Historic Places in 2010 and Martin–Fitch House and Asa Fitch Jr. Laboratory in 2014.

=== People of note in the town of Salem ===
- Francis J. Clark (1912–1981), World War II Congressional Medal of Honor recipient; entered the service in Salem.
- Dr. Asa Fitch (1803–1879), entomologist; born, educated, and died in Salem.
- William K. McAllister (1818–1888), Illinois Supreme Court justice, was born in Salem.
- James S. Parker (1867–1933), former US Congressman
- Eli Waste (1827–1894), Wisconsin State Assemblyman, was born in Salem.

== Geography ==
According to the United States Census Bureau, the town has a total area of 52.5 square miles (136.0 km^{2}), of which 52.5 square miles (135.9 km^{2}) is land and 0.1 square mile (0.1 km^{2}) (0.10%) is water.

The eastern town line is the border of Vermont, and the beginning of New England proper. Part of the western and southern town boundaries are defined by the Batten Kill, a tributary of the Hudson River that has its beginnings in Vermont.

NY Route 29 joins NY Route 22 at Greenwich Junction, and Route 22 continues north into the town of Hebron.

== Demographics ==
Historical population
Census	Pop.	Note	%±
1820	2,985		—
1830	2,972		−0.4%
1840	2,855		−3.9%
1850	2,904		1.7%
1860	3,181		9.5%
1870	3,556		11.8%
1880	3,498		−1.6%
1890	3,127		−10.6%
1900	2,978		−4.8%
1910	2,780		−6.6%
1920	2,235		−19.6%
1930	2,145		−4.0%
1940	2,127		−0.8%
1950	2,171		2.1%
1960	2,258		4.0%
1970	2,346		3.9%
1980	2,377		1.3%
1990	2,608		9.7%
2000	2,706		3.8%
2010	2,715		0.3%
2020	2,612		−3.8%
U.S. Decennial Census

As of the census of 2000, there were 2,702 people, 1,065 households, and 740 families residing in the town. The population density was 51.5 inhabitants per square mile (19.9/km^{2}). There were 1,285 housing units at an average density of 9.5 persons/km^{2} (24.5 persons/sq mi). The racial makeup of the town was 98.11% White, 0.93% African American, 0.07% Native American, 0.19% Asian, 0.04% Pacific Islander, 0.04% from other races, and 0.63% from two or more races. 0.56% of the population were Hispanic or Latino of any race.

There were 1,065 households, out of which 32.1% had children under the age of 18 living with them, 55.0% were married couples living together, 9.5% have a woman whose husband does not live with her, and 30.5% were non-families. 24.7% of all households were made up of individuals, and 11.8% had someone living alone who was 65 years of age or older. The average household size was 2.48 and the average family size was 2.93.

In the town, the population was spread out, with 24.5% under the age of 18, 7.3% from 18 to 24, 26.4% from 25 to 44, 26.4% from 45 to 64, and 15.4% who were 65 years of age or older. The median age was 40 years. For every 100 females, there were 102.5 males. For every 100 females age 18 and over, there were 98.8 males.

The median income for a household in the town was $40,227, and the median income for a family was $45,668. Males had a median income of $32,821 versus $22,167 for females. The per capita income for the town was $19,499. 8.3% of the population and 5.6% of families were below the poverty line. Out of the total people living in poverty, 9.1% are under the age of 18 and 5.9% are 65 or older.

== Communities and locations in the town ==
=== Communities ===
- Eagleville – A hamlet at the southern town line on the Batten Kill.
- Fitch Point – A hamlet near the western town line on NY-29.
- Greenwich Junction – A hamlet southeast of Salem village at the junction of NY-22 and NY-29.
- Rexleigh – A hamlet at the eastern town boundary on the Batten Kill.
- Salem – A hamlet located on NY-22, formerly an incorporated village.
- Shushan – A hamlet at the southern town line on the Batten Kill. It is the location of the Shushan Bridge, an historic covered bridge. Part of the community is in the town of Jackson.

=== Geographical features ===
- Black Creek – A stream flowing through the western part of the town.
- Blind Buck Brook – A stream entering the Batten Kill south of Rexleigh.
- Camden Creek – A stream in the eastern part of the town, it enters the Batten Kill west of Eagleville.
- Dillon Hill – An elevation by the western town line.
- East Beaver Brook – A stream flowing through Salem village.
- Juniper Swamp Brook – A tributary of the Batten Kill.
- Scott Lake – A lake near the northern town line.
- Steele Brook – A stream west of Camden Creek. It enters the Batten Kill, west of Eagleville.
- West Beaver Brook – A tributary of Black Brook.
- Wheeler Hill – An elevation by the eastern town line.

=== Points of interest ===
- Shushan Covered Bridge
- Rexleigh Covered Bridge
- Eagleville Covered Bridge
- Georgi Museum & Gardens; art collection of Italian, Dutch, Flemish, German and French paintings from the fourteenth through the eighteenth centuries.
- Revolutionary War Cemetery
- Historic Salem Courthouse & Prison
- Fort Salem Theater
- Salem Art Works
- Asa Fitch Home & Laboratory (National Registry of Historic properties - MARTIN-FITCH HOUSE & ASA FITCH, JR. LABORATORY)
