= Alexander McNish House =

Historic house in New York, United States

- U.S. National Register of Historic Places
- Location within New York Location within the United States
- Location: 194 County Road 30, Salem, New York
- Coordinates: 43°10′14″N 73°21′07″W
- Area: 8.0 acres (3.2 ha)
- Built: c. 1794
- Architectural style: Georgian
- NRHP reference No.: 10000959
- Added to NRHP: November 29, 2010

The Alexander McNish House (also known as the McNish-Musser House) is a historic house located at 194 County Road 30 in Salem, Washington County, New York.

== Description and history ==
It was built about 1794, and is a two-story, five bay by three bay, brick dwelling with a gambrel roof and dormers. It is representative of the Georgian style. It has a one-story frame addition and a connected former carriage house. Also on the property is a contributing timber frame barn (c. 1850).

It was added to the National Register of Historic Places on November 29, 2010.
