= Batten Kill =

Batten Kill Battenkill River
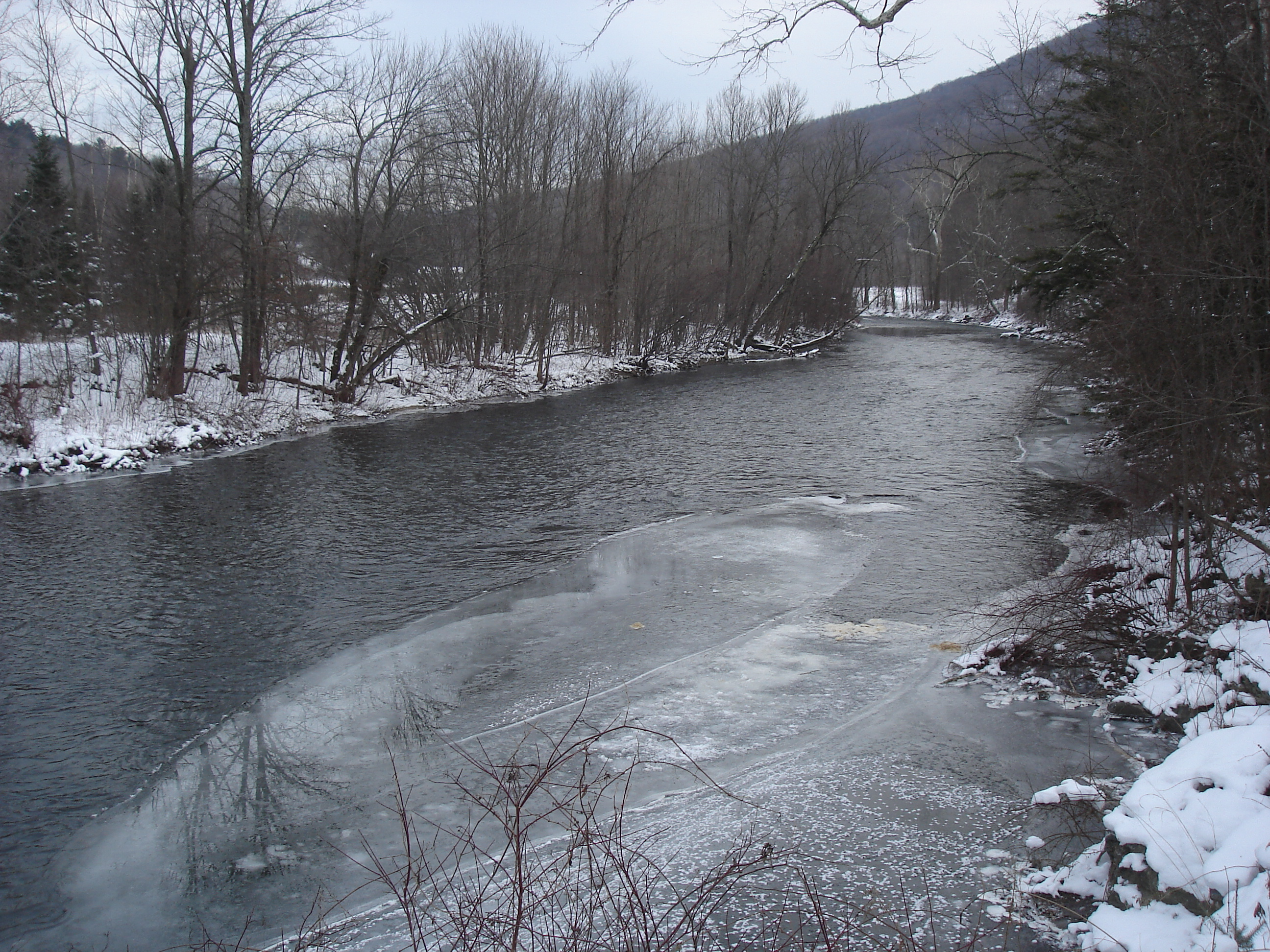

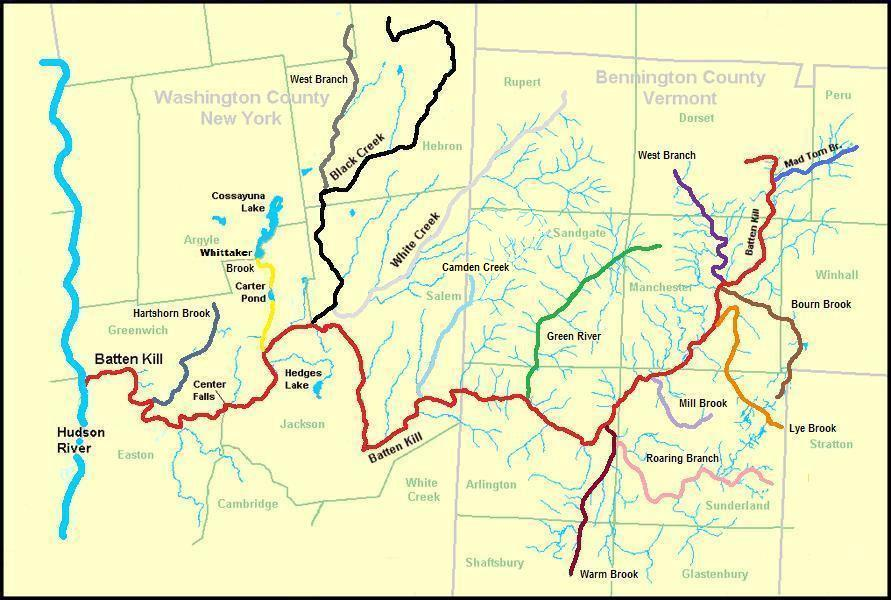
- Batten Kill and tributaries
- Native name: Dionoondehowee

Location
- Country: United States
- State: Vermont, New York
- County: Bennington, Washington

Physical characteristics
- Source
  - location: East Dorset, Bennington County, Vermont; Green Mountains, Taconic Mountains
  - coordinates: 43°14′53″N 73°00′16″W
- Mouth: Hudson River
  - location: Easton, New York
  - coordinates: 43°06′34″N 73°34′30″W
  - elevation: 82 ft (25 m)
- Length: 59 mi (95 km)
- Basin size: 407 sq mi (1,050 km^{2})

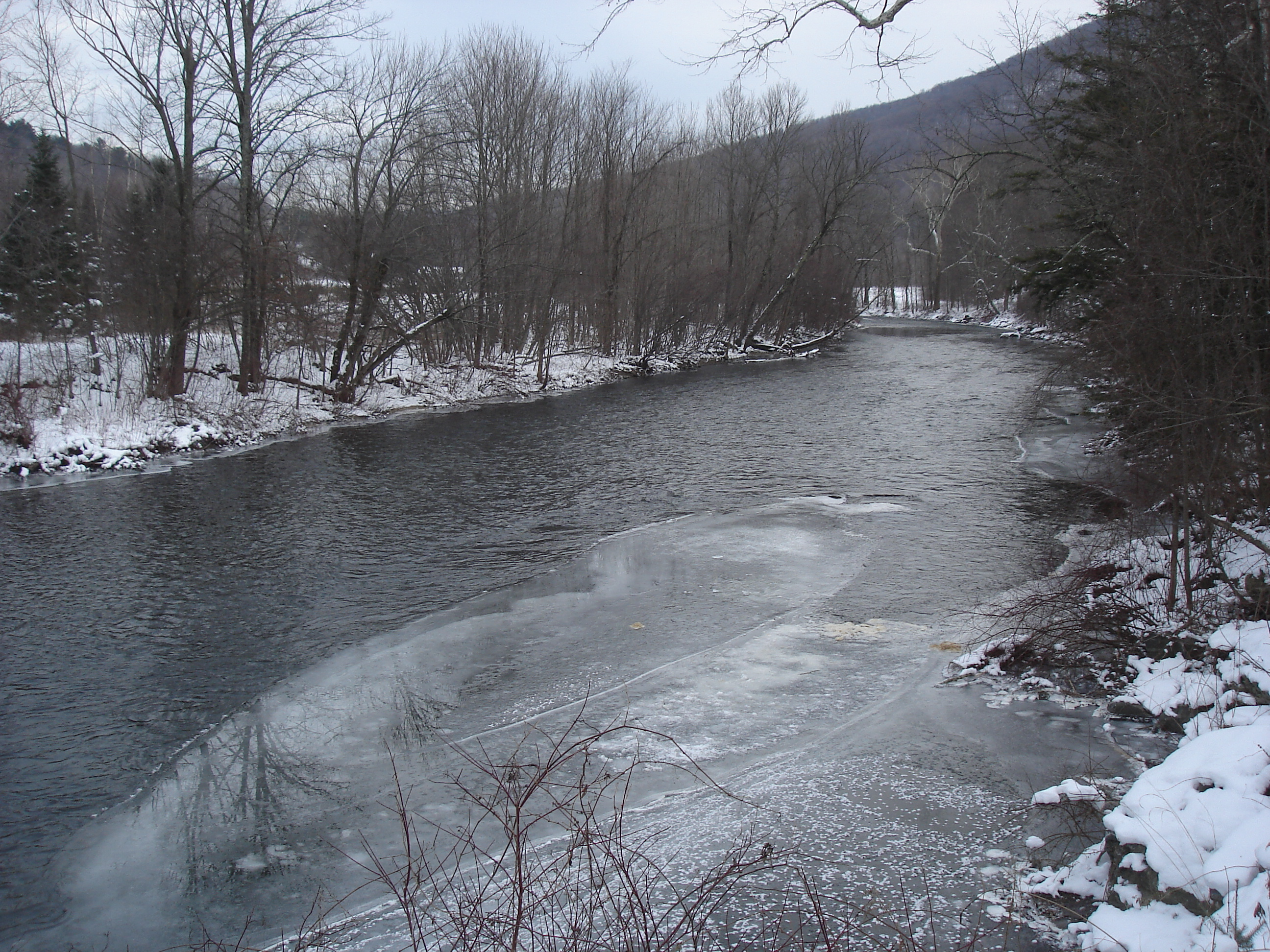
The Batten Kill as it flows through West Arlington, Vermont

The Batten Kill, Battenkill, or Battenkill River is a 59.4-mile-long (95.6 km) river rising in Vermont that flows into New York and is a tributary of the Hudson River. It is the longest Hudson tributary on that river's east. As "kill" means a creek, the name "Battenkill River" is pleonastic.

The mouth of the Batten Kill is in Easton, New York, and the source of the river is in East Dorset, Vermont.

The river is known for its fishing, as it has a prominent trout population. The Shushan Covered Bridge crosses it at one point. As does the Rexleigh Bridge.

The Batten Kill valley is home to the Tour of the Battenkill, the largest road cycling race in North America.

The Native American name for the river is either Dionoondehowee or Ondawa.

== Tributaries ==
- Mad Tom Brook
- Bourn Brook
- Lye Brook
- Mill Brook
- Warm Brook
- Green River
- Camden Creek
- Black Creek
- Whittaker Brook
- Hartshorn Brook

== Course ==
The Batten Kill rises in East Dorset, Vermont, and flows south, with Mad Tom Brook soon joining it from the southern slope of Mount Tabor. It flows in a southwesterly direction to Arlington and then in a westerly direction, entering New York. The river continues west, forming the boundary between the towns of Jackson and Salem, turning north at the hamlet of Shushan. Turning west again at Greenwich Junction, the river becomes the boundary between Jackson and the town of Greenwich, passing the hamlets of East Greenwich, Battenville and Center Falls before reaching the village of Greenwich. The Batten Kill continues as the boundary between Greenwich and the town of Easton, past the hamlet of Middle Falls and ends at the Hudson River, at a point one mile (1.6 km) north of Schuylerville.

From source to mouth following the major windings, the river measures 59.4 miles (95.6 km). The length of the river in Vermont is approximately 28 miles (45 km).

== Watershed ==
The Vermont portion of the Batten Kill watershed drains much of the northern portion of Bennington County and includes an area of approximately 200 square miles (520 km^{2}). The New York portion of the watershed covers 207 square miles (540 km^{2}).

The Vermont portion of the Batten Kill watershed is mountainous, steep and heavily forested. The tributaries are, for the most part, wooded, steep and narrow. National Forest Service land in this watershed is almost 44,000 acres (180 km^{2}). The average yearly rainfall over the entire basin area is 42.9 inches (1,090 mm). The following river and tributary descriptions for the Vermont portion of the basin were taken in part from the United States Geological Survey publication Surface Waters of Vermont.

Mad Tom Brook rises on the southern slope of Mount Tabor in the northwestern part of the town of Peru at an altitude of 2,900 feet (880 m) above sea level. It flows southward and south-westward to East Dorset where it joins the beginning of the Batten Kill from the north. Its length is about 5.5 miles (8.9 km), and its fall is about 2,100 feet (640 m).

The West Branch rises on the northern slope of Bear Mountain in the southeastern part of the town of Rupert at an altitude of about 2,500 feet (760 m) above sea level. It flows eastward about 2 miles (3.2 km), then turns and flows southeastward to near Manchester Center. The West Branch has a length of about 9 miles (14 km) and a fall of 1,800 feet (550 m), of which 1,600 feet (490 m) occurs in the first 2 miles (3.2 km).

Bourn Brook rises in Bourn Pond in the northeastern part of the town of Sunderland at an altitude of 2,500 feet (760 m) above sea level. It flows somewhat east of north for about 2 miles (3.2 km) and then takes a northwesterly course to its junction with the Batten Kill half a mile south of Manchester Center. Its length is about 6 miles (9.7 km) and fall about 1,800 feet (550 m) of which 1,300 feet (400 m) of drop occurs within 1.5 miles (2.4 km) in the middle of its course.

Lye Brook rises in Lye Brook Meadows in the northeastern part of Sunderland at an elevation of 2,640 feet (800 m) above sea level. It flows in a northerly direction about 5 miles (8.0 km), then turns abruptly and flows southwestward to its junction with the Batten Kill. Its length is 6.2 miles (10.0 km), and its fall is 1,900 feet (580 m), of which 1,800 feet (550 m) occurs in the northward flowing stretch.

Mill Brook rises near the center of Sunderland at an altitude of 2,550 feet (780 m) above sea level and flows southwestward, westward and northwestward to its junction with the Batten Kill at Sunderland. Its length is approximately 4.5 miles (7.2 km) and its fall about 1,920 feet (590 m), of which 1,600 feet (490 m) occurs within 2.5 miles (4.0 km) of the head of the stream.

The Green River flows generally southward from its source, west of Manchester, passing through Sandgate, 814 feet (248 m) above sea level and winding to its junction with the Batten Kill on the south side of State Route 313 at West Arlington.

Camden Creek flows south to southwest from its source, just east of the New York state line, near West Sandgate. A little less than one mile south of its source, it is joined by Terry Brook, which flows in from the east. The creek runs south-southwest through the Camden Valley, crossing into Washington County, New York. It is joined by West Camden Creek from the north about one quarter mile from its junction with the Batten Kill on the north side of NY State Route 313, east of the hamlet of Shushan.

== Covered bridges ==
The Batten Kill is crossed by four covered bridges, three of which are still in use today: West Arlington Bridge, Vermont (1852), Eagleville Bridge, New York (1858), Shushan Covered Bridge, New York (1858–1962), and Rexleigh Covered Bridge, New York (1874). The Shushan Covered Bridge is now a seasonal museum.

== Agriculture ==
- Sheldon Farms (1845)

== Battle of Saratoga ==
The Batten Kill was supposed to be a fallback point for the British General Burgoyne's forces, but was never used and thus did not play a significant role in the battle.

== See also ==
- List of rivers of New York
- List of rivers of Vermont
