= Rexleigh Bridge =

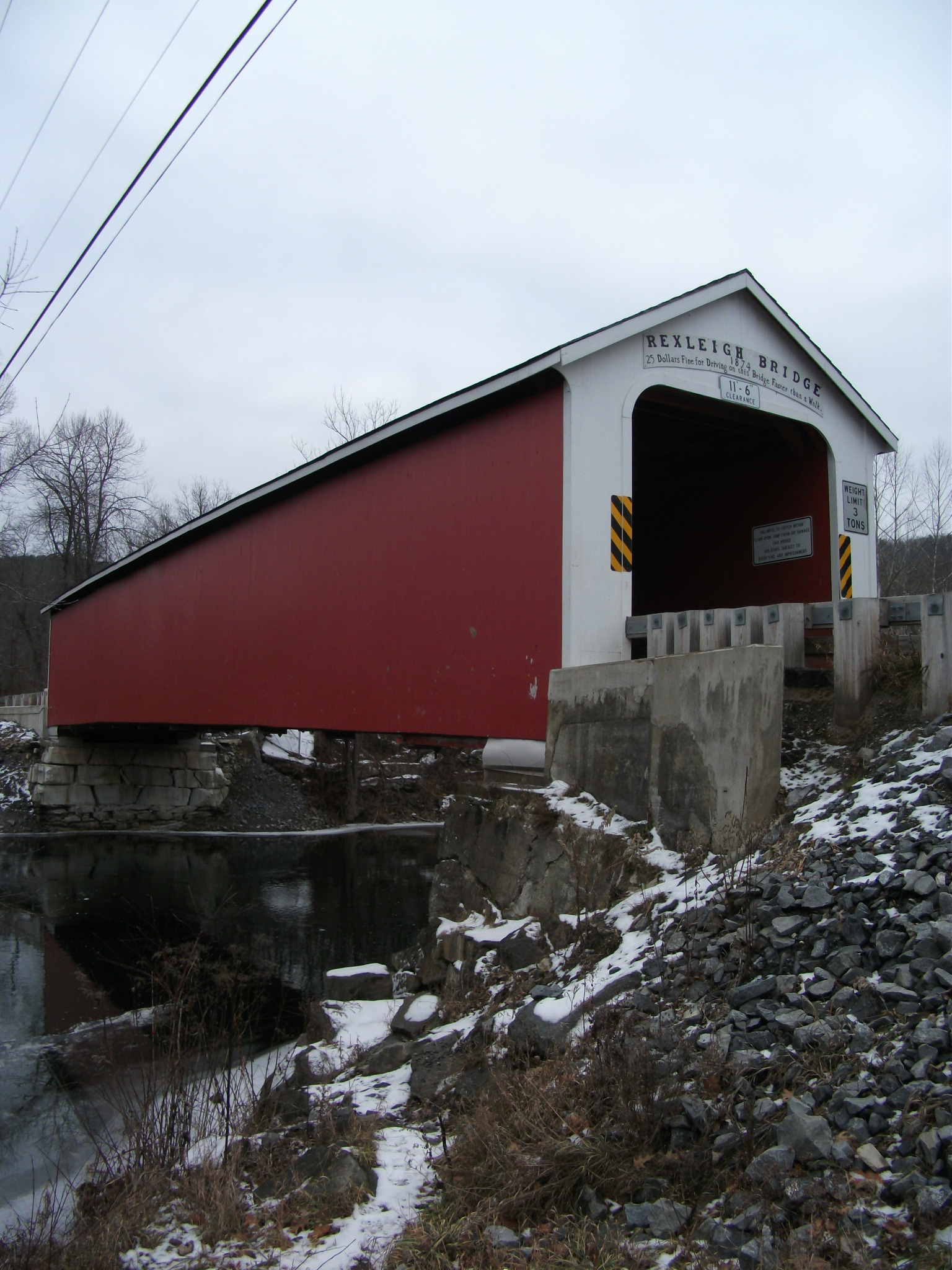
- Rexleigh Covered Bridge, December 2010
- Coordinates: 43°08′05″N 73°21′21″W
- Crosses: Battenkill
- Rexleigh Covered Bridge
- U.S. National Register of Historic Places
- Location: Off NY 22, Jackson, New York
- Coordinates: 43°8′5.12″N 73°21′20.46″W
- Area: 1 acre (0.40 ha)
- Built: 1874
- Architectural style: Howe truss
- MPS: Covered Bridges of Washington County TR / Buskirk, Rexleigh, Eagleville, and Shushan Covered Bridges
- NRHP reference No.: 78003459
- Added to NRHP: March 8, 1978

Location
- Interactive map of Rexleigh Bridge

Rexleigh Bridge is a wooden covered bridge over the Batten Kill in Washington County, New York. It is one of 29 historic covered bridges in New York State.

Town and Howe truss designs were patented by Ithiel Town in 1820 and William Howe in 1840, respectively. The Rexleigh Bridge employs "the patented Howe truss, with paired diagonal timbers, single timber counters, and multiple vertical iron rods defining each truss panel. The diagonals and verticals are connected to the upper and lower chords by means of cast-iron bearing blocks." Those bearing blocks are "embossed with the name of their manufacturer, 'R. Comins, Troy, N.Y.,'" and, although the timber used is local, the bridge "appears to be a rare surviving example of this type of prefabricated nineteenth-century bridge construction."

It was individually inventoried by the New York State Office of Parks, Recreation and Historic Preservation in 1977.

It is one of four Washington County covered bridges submitted for listing in the National Register of Historic Places in one multiple property submission. The others are the Buskirk Bridge, the Eagleville Bridge, and Shushan Bridge. All four were listed on the National Register of Historic Places on March 8, 1972.
