= Asa Gray House =

Historic house in Massachusetts, United States

- U.S. National Register of Historic Places
- U.S. National Historic Landmark
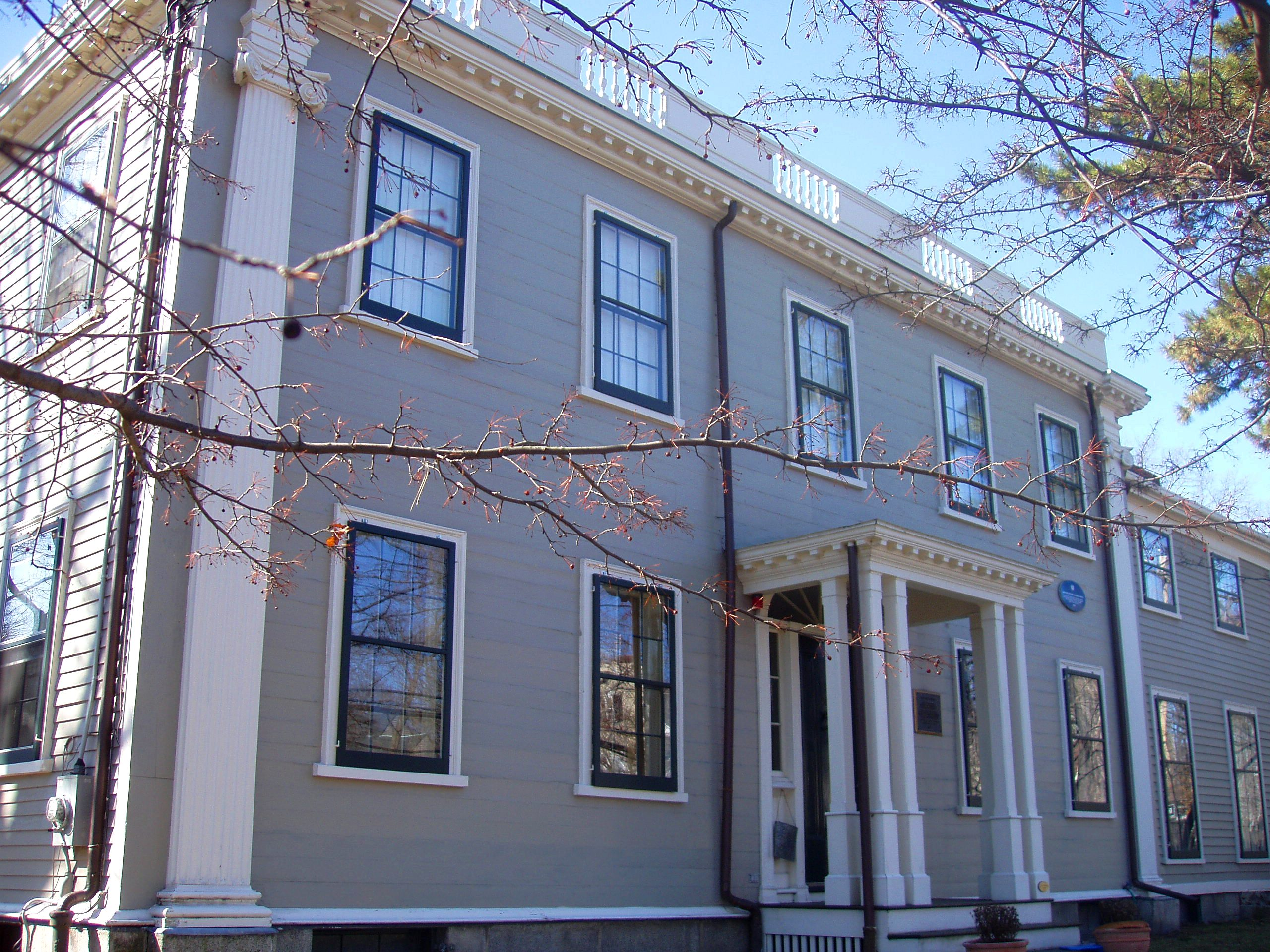
- Location: 88 Garden St., Cambridge, Massachusetts
- Coordinates: 42°22′58.7″N 71°7′40.8″W
- Area: less than one acre
- Built: 1810
- Architect: Ithiel Town
- NRHP reference No.: 66000655

Significant dates
- Added to NRHP: October 15, 1966
- Designated NHL: January 12, 1965

The Asa Gray House, recorded in an HABS survey as the Garden House, is a historic house at 88 Garden Street, Cambridge, Massachusetts. A National Historic Landmark, it is notable architecturally as the earliest known work of the designer and architect Ithiel Town, and historically as the residence of several Harvard College luminaries. Its most notable occupant was Asa Gray (1810–88), a leading botanist who published the first complete work on American flora, and was a vigorous defender of the Darwinian theory of evolution.

== History ==
The Gray House was designed in 1810 by architect Ithiel Town, whose earliest known work it is. It was built for the zoologist William Dandridge Peck, and originally stood at the corner of Garden and Linnaean Streets in Cambridge, Massachusetts, on the grounds of the Harvard College Botanical Garden. Subsequent occupants included botanist Thomas Nuttall and Harvard presidents James Walker and Jared Sparks. Asa Gray purchased the house in 1842 and moved in during the summer of 1844, after receiving an appointment to a professorship at Harvard that he would hold for 45 years. Already a rising star in the world of botany, Gray in 1848 published The General of the Plants of the United States, which was not only groundbreaking for the content, but also in its presentation. His discovery of relationships between plants of North America and East Asia was influential in the growth of the field of plant geography. His highly public defense of Charles Darwin's On the Origin of Species gained him widespread attention in the public sphere.

The Gray House was purchased in 1910 by Allen Cox, who moved it to its present address the same year. Gardner Cox (one of Allen's children and a well known artist in Boston, converted the attached carriage house into an art studio). Benjamin (an executive) & Liz Shepherd (a sculptor and printmaker) bought the house in 1999 and restored it. They were awarded a Restoration Award for their work by the Cambridge Historical Commission in 2001. They restored the art studio in 2006. It is still a private residence, and was declared a National Historic Landmark in 1965.

== Architecture ==
The house has a rectangular main block, measuring 40 by 36 feet (12 m × 11 m), with a side ell that is about 24 feet (7.3 m) square. When first built, it was attached to a plant conservatory that was also designed by Town. The house is two stories tall and five bays wide, with a hip roof surrounded by a low balustrade. The main facade is flushboarded, with pilasters at the corners; the other sides of the house are sheathed in clapboards. The cornice on the main block is dentillated; that on the ell is plain. The main entrance is centered on the front facade, with sidelight windows on either side and a fanlight window above. The entry is sheltered by a portico supported by clustered square columns; this portico is a replacement to the original, made when the house was moved. There is a secondary entrance in the ell, which is sheltered by a closed-in porch dating to c. 1920. At the rear of the house is an addition, roughly dating to the move but extended later, which incorporates a formerly-external shed into the house.

The interior of the house follows a typical Federal-period center hall plan, with the central hall divided into front and rear sections (each with a staircase) by a doorway with a fanlight. There are two rooms on either side of the central hall. The woodwork in the public spaces is not particularly elaborate, with simple cornice moldings and fireplace surrounds, and flared moldings around the windows. The downstairs room of the ell served as Asa Gray's study, and includes a number of wood-frame display cases lining one wall.

== See also ==
- List of National Historic Landmarks in Massachusetts
- National Register of Historic Places listings in Cambridge, Massachusetts

== Images ==
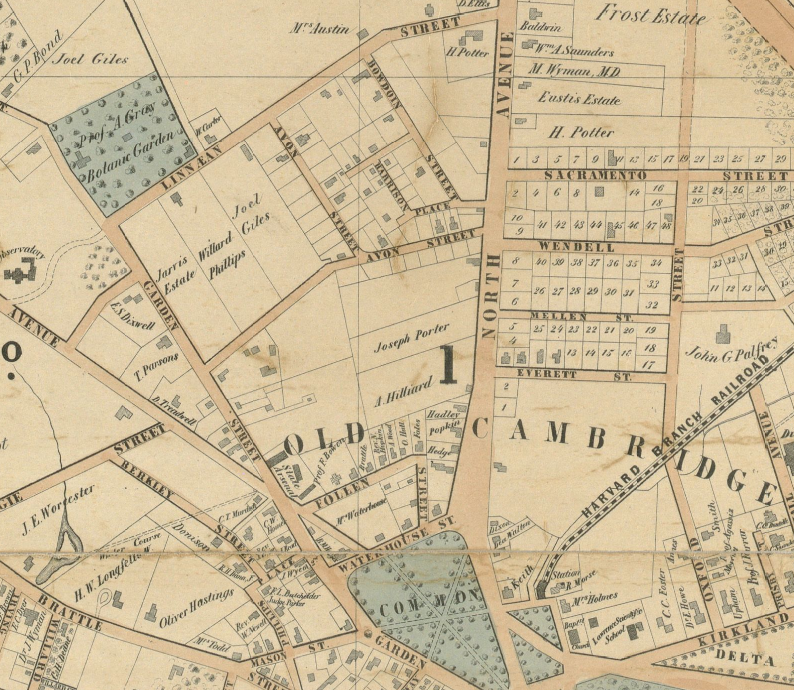
Detail of 1854 map of Cambridge, showing "Prof. A. Gray Botanic Garden" on Garden Street
