= Ithiel Town =

American architect (1784–1844)

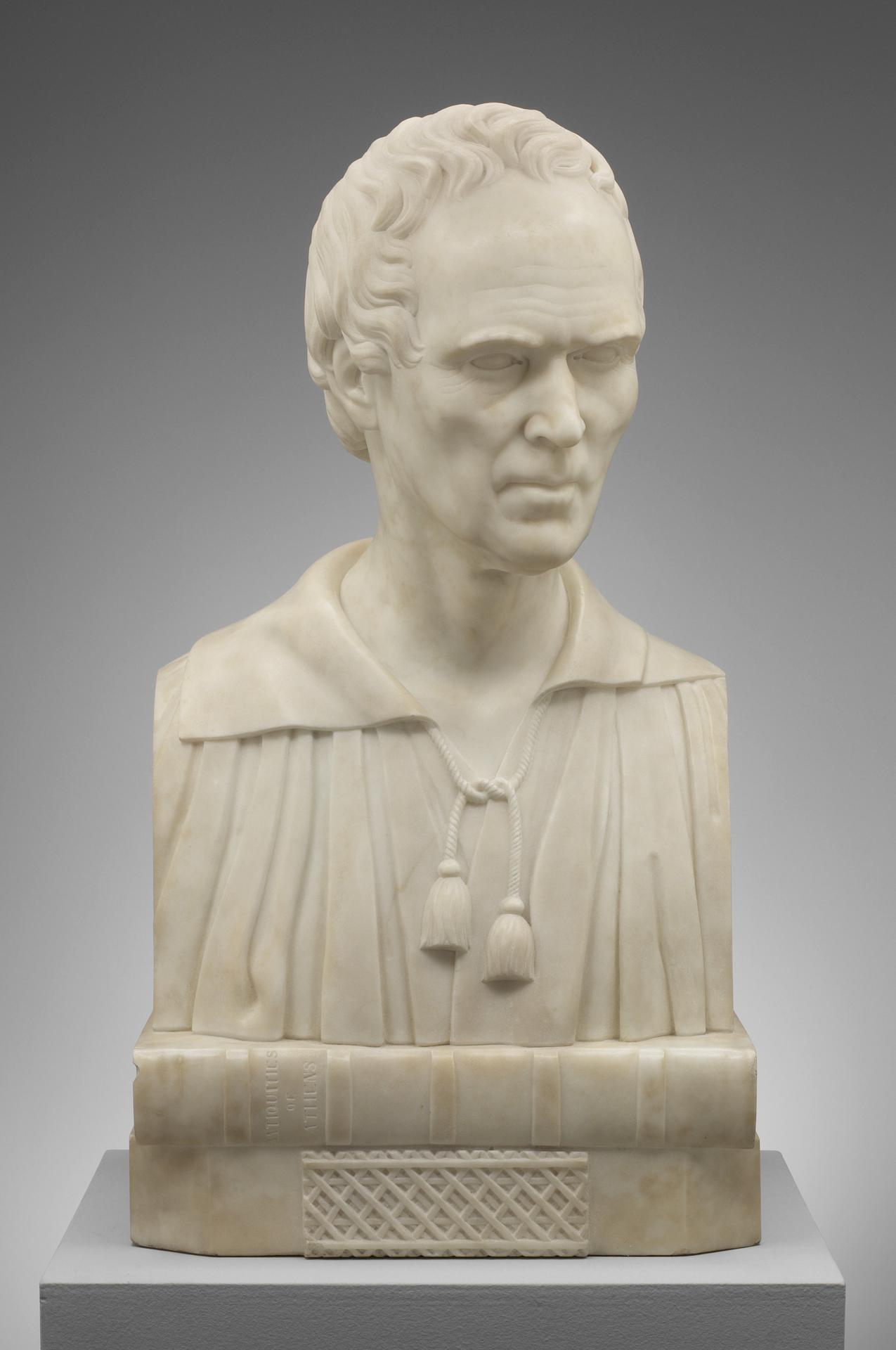
- Bust of Town by Chauncey Ives, 1825
- Born: October 3, 1784; Thompson, Connecticut
- Died: June 13, 1844 (aged 59); New Haven, Connecticut
- Occupation: Architect
- Awards: National Academy of Design; Yale honorary degree
- Practice: Town and Davis
- Buildings: Center Church; Trinity Church; Wadsworth Atheneum
- Design: Lattice truss bridge

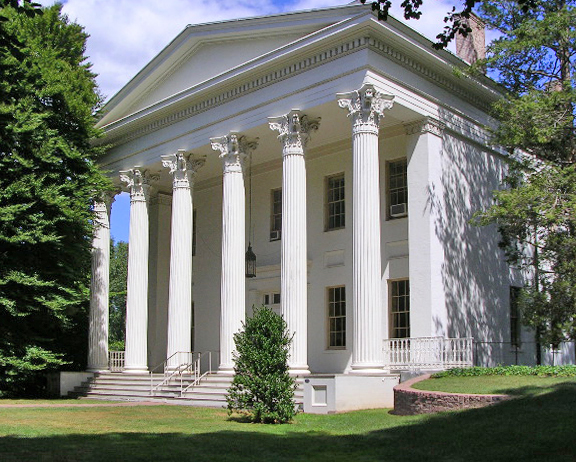
Samuel Russell House, Middletown, Connecticut (with David Hoadley)

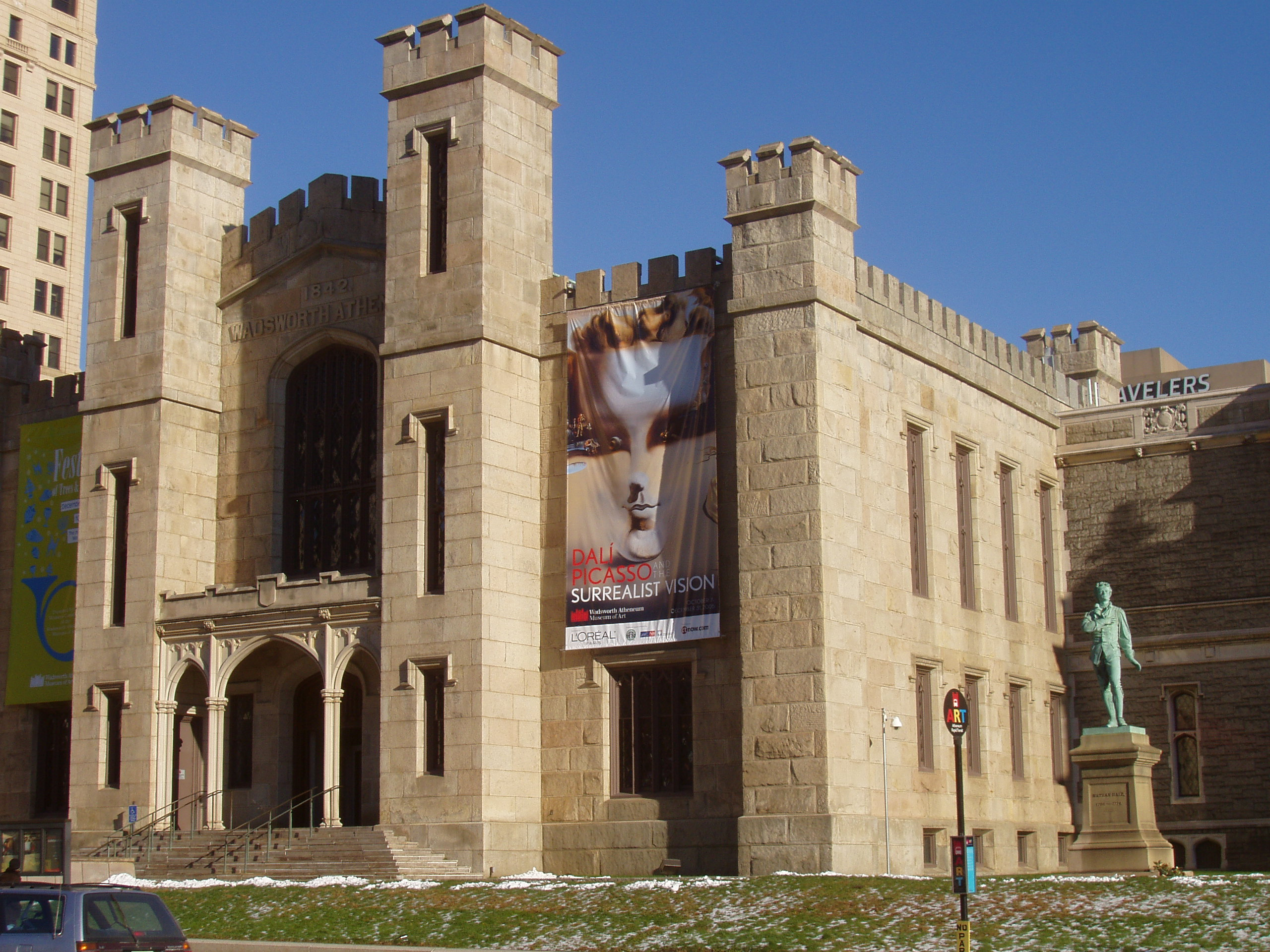
Wadsworth Atheneum, Hartford, Connecticut (with A. J. Davis)

Ithiel Town (October 3, 1784 – June 13, 1844) was an American architect and civil engineer. One of the first generation of professional architects in the United States, Town made significant contributions to American architecture in the first half of the 19th century. His work, in the Federal and revivalist Greek and Gothic Revival architectural styles, was influential and widely copied.

== Life and works ==
Town was born in Thompson, Connecticut, to Archelaus Town, a farmer, and Martha (Johnson) Town. He trained with the eminent Asher Benjamin in Boston and began his own professional career with the Asa Gray House (1810).

His earliest important architectural works include Center Church (1812–1815), and Trinity Church (1813–1816), both on the New Haven Green in New Haven, Connecticut. He demonstrated his virtuosity as an engineer by constructing the spire for Center Church inside the tower and then raising it into place in less than three hours using a special windlass. Trinity Church, built from local seam-faced trap rock and topped with a square tower, was one of the earliest Gothic Revival churches in America.

In 1825, Town became one of the original members of the National Academy of Design and was awarded an honorary Master of Arts degree from Yale University.

=== Town's lattice bridge ===
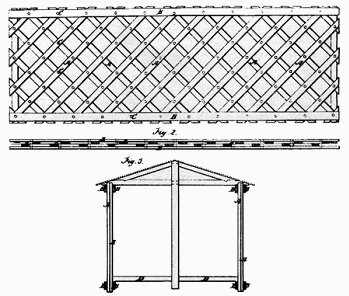
Town's lattice truss patent drawing

On January 28, 1820, Town was granted a patent for a wooden lattice truss bridge, which became known as the Town Bridge. The design was of great importance because it could be built quickly by relatively unskilled workers from readily available material. The design also avoided the need for the heavy piers needed for stone arches. The design was widely known throughout the world and made Town wealthy (Town is said to have charged one to two dollars per foot in royalties for his designs). Town's design can still be seen in two of Connecticut's remaining covered bridges, Bull's Bridge in Kent and West Cornwall Covered Bridge in Cornwall and Sharon, and in the Eagleville Bridge and the Shushan Bridge in Washington County, New York. Many other extant covered bridges also employ Town's basic design. The lattice is sometimes called a truss, although it lacks vertical members.

=== Town and Davis ===
In 1829, Town formed one of the first professional architectural firms in the United States with Alexander Jackson Davis, together producing notable buildings in a range of new Revival styles, including Greek, Gothic, Tuscan, and Egyptian. Town also traveled in Europe during this period (1829–30).

The firm lasted until 1835; for eighteen months in 1832 and 1833, it operated as Town, Davis, and Dakin, when James H. Dakin joined the firm. Their works included the state capitol in New Haven, the city hall and Wadsworth Atheneum in Hartford, Connecticut, the capitol buildings of Indiana (1831–1840, demolished 1877), and North Carolina (1833–1840), and the U.S. Custom House, now Federal Hall National Memorial, in New York City (1833–1842). During this time, Town also designed the Potomac Aqueduct in Washington, D.C. (1833–1843), which allowed fully loaded canal boats to cross the Potomac River. It was considered one of the most remarkable engineering feats of the time.

=== Home and library ===
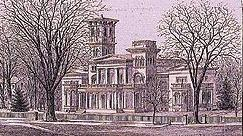
Town-Sheffield Mansion, New Haven, Connecticut

Town designed his New Haven home on Hillhouse Avenue in the Greek Revival style; here he kept what was then an extraordinary architectural library — an inspiration to many, including Davis and another noted New Haven architect, Henry Austin. His library contained more than 11,000 volumes of architecture books and prints and was far larger than any other personal collection anywhere at the time, including that of Sir John Soane in London. The library was amassed at a time when only a handful of significant architecture books had been published in America. Town left many of his books to Yale upon his death; the rest were sold.

In 1839, Town commissioned noted American painter Thomas Cole to execute a painting called The Architect's Dream, which now hangs in the Toledo Museum of Art.

Town's house was later owned by Joseph Earl Sheffield, benefactor of the Sheffield Scientific School and modified by Austin. Town designed a number of other stately homes on Hillhouse.

=== Death ===
Town died in New Haven on June 13, 1844, and is interred in Grove Street Cemetery, New Haven, Connecticut.

== Selected works ==
- Asa Gray House, Cambridge, Massachusetts, 1810. Federal
- Center Church, New Haven, Connecticut, 1812–1815. Federal
- Trinity Church on the Green, New Haven, Connecticut, 1813–1816, Gothic Revival
- Groton Monument, obelisk, 1826.
- Samuel Wadsworth Russell House, Wesleyan University, Middletown, Connecticut, 1828. Greek revival.
- North Presbyterian Church (1831–1832), 273 Bleecker Street, Carmine Street, Greenwich Village—Founded in 1829, sanctuary built 1831-1832 to designs by Town & Davis. "Within a few years it changed its name to West Presbyterian Church (New York City)." It has since been demolished.
- Skinner House, New Haven, Connecticut (now Yale International Center of Finance), Town and Davis, 1832. Greek revival.
- Colonnade Row, New York, New York, 1832. Greek Revival.
- North Carolina State Capitol, Raleigh, North Carolina, Town and Davis, 1840. Greek revival.
- U. S. Custom House, now Federal Hall National Memorial, New York City, Town and Davis, 1833–1842. Greek revival.
- Apthorp House, New Haven, Connecticut (now Evans Hall, Yale School of Management), Town and Davis, 1836
- State capitol, New Haven, Connecticut, 1837. Greek revival. Razed
- Indiana Statehouse, Town and Davis, 1840. Demolished in 1877.
- Wadsworth Atheneum, Hartford, Connecticut, 1842. Gothic revival
- Leake and Watt's Children's Home, New York, New York, 1843. Greek revival
- Ithiel Town (Sheffield) Mansion, New Haven, Connecticut. Greek revival. Razed

== Selected writings ==
- A Description of Ithiel Town's Improvement in the Construction of Wood and Iron Bridges (New Haven, 1821)
- A Detail of Some Particular Services Performed in America, During the Years 1776, 1777, 1778, and 1779, Compiled from Journals and Original Papers...taken from the Journal Kept on Board of the Ship 'Rainbow' Commanded By Sir George Collier (New York, 1835)
- Atlantic Steamships. Ideas and Statements, The Result of Considerable Reflection on the Subject of Navigating the Atlantic Ocean with Steam-Ships of Large Tonnage. Also, the Arrival, Description, and Departure of the Two First British Steam-Ships (Wiley & Putnam/J. P. Wright, New York, 1838)

== See also ==
- New Hampshire Historical Marker No. 158: Cornish-Windsor Bridge
- New Hampshire Historical Marker No. 190: Haverhill-Bath Bridge
