= Sparta (town), Wisconsin =

Sparta, Wisconsin
- Town
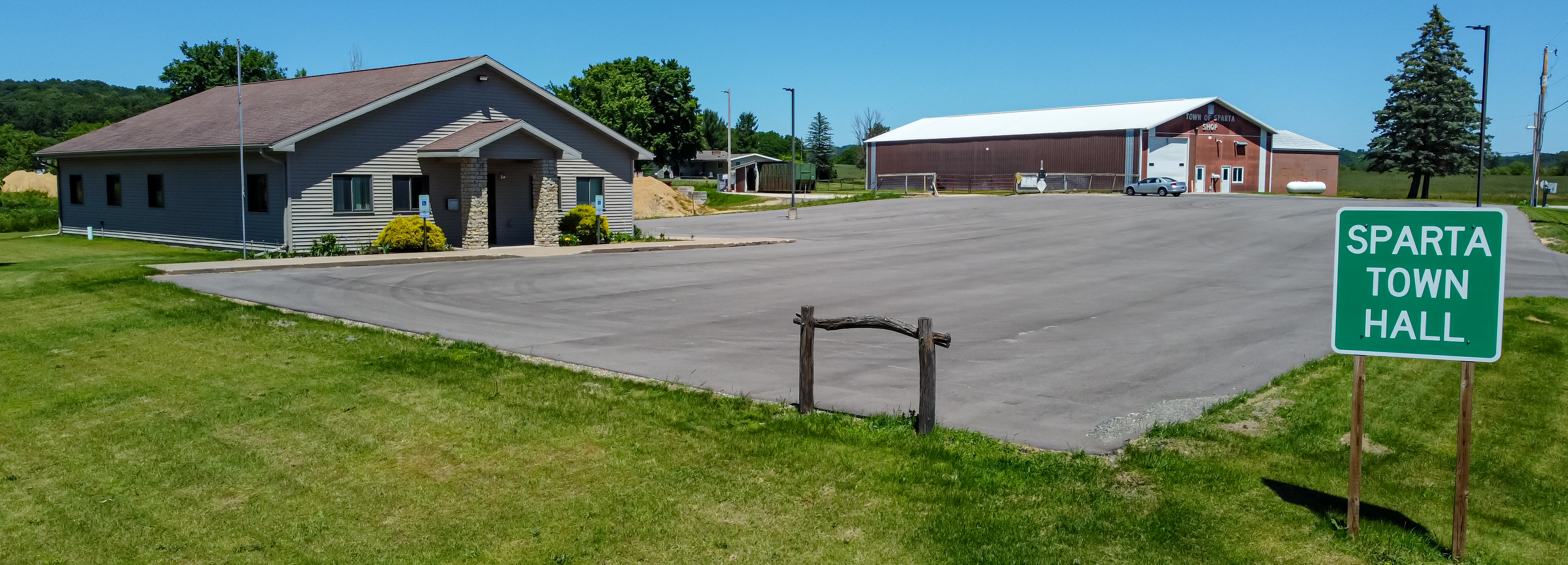
- Sparta Town Hall

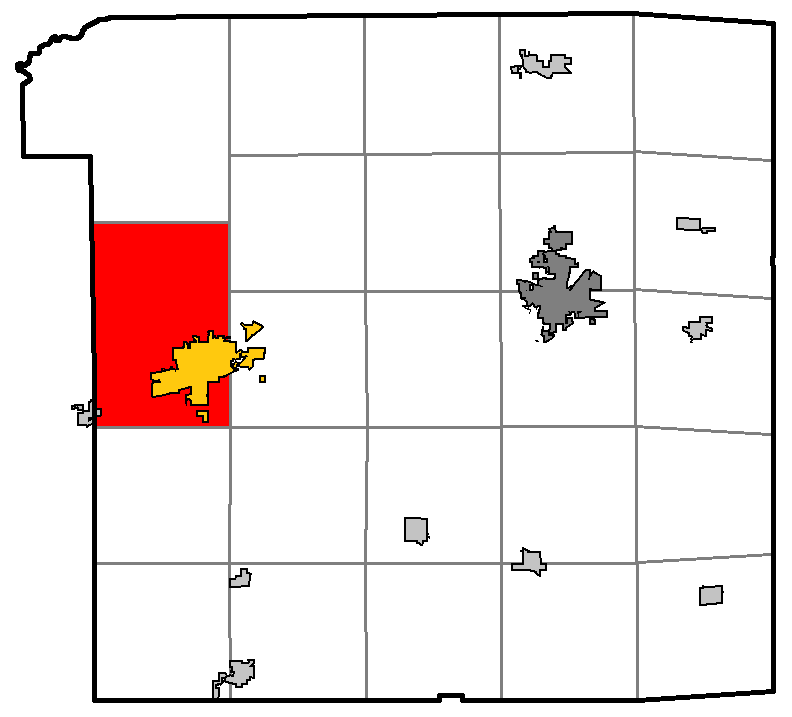
- Location of Sparta, Monroe County

- Location of Monroe County, Wisconsin
- Coordinates: 43°56′36″N 90°50′56″W
- Country: United States
- State: Wisconsin
- County: Monroe

Area
  - Total: 49.3 sq mi (127.6 km^{2})
  - Land: 49.3 sq mi (127.6 km^{2})
  - Water: 0 sq mi (0.0 km^{2})
- Elevation: 997 ft (304 m)

Population (2020)
  - Total: 3,253
  - Density: 66.03/sq mi (25.49/km^{2})
- Time zone: UTC-6 (Central (CST))
  - Summer (DST): UTC-5 (CDT)
- Area code: 608
- FIPS code: 55-75350
- GNIS feature ID: 1584182
- Website: http://townsparta.com/

Sparta is a town in Monroe County, Wisconsin, United States. The population was 3,253 at the 2020 census.

== Geography ==
According to the United States Census Bureau, the town has a total area of 127.6 km^{2} (49.3 sq mi), all land. The La Crosse River, Black River, and Beaver Creek run through the town.

== Demographics ==
As of the census of 2000, there were 925 households, and 745 families residing in the town. The population density was 55.8 people per square mile (21.5 people/km^{2}). There were 967 housing units at an average density of 19.6 units per square mile (7.6 units/km^{2}). The racial makeup of the town was 98.80% White, 0.04% Black or African American, 0.18% Native American, 0.44% Asian, 0.04% Pacific Islander, 0.07% from other races, and 0.44% from two or more races. 0.33% of the population were Hispanic or Latino of any race.

There were 925 households, out of which 36.5% had children under the age of 18 living with them, 72.0% were married couples living together, 5.3% had a female householder with no husband present, and 19.4% were non-families. 14.3% of all households were made up of individuals, and 5.8% had someone living alone who was 65 years of age or older. The average household size was 2.82 and the average family size was 3.12.

In the town, the population was spread out, with 26.2% under the age of 18, 6.3% from 18 to 24, 25.3% from 25 to 44, 28.1% from 45 to 64, and 14.1% who were 65 years of age or older. The median age was 40 years. For every 100 females, there were 99.7 males. For every 100 females age 18 and over, there were 100.4 males.

The median income for a household in the town was $49,769, and the median income for a family was $53,798. Males had a median income of $33,105 versus $23,984 for females. The per capita income for the town was $19,488. About 1.9% of families and 4.0% of the population were below the poverty line, including 4.6% of those under age 18 and 7.2% of those age 65 or over.
