= Jackson, New York =

Jackson
- Town
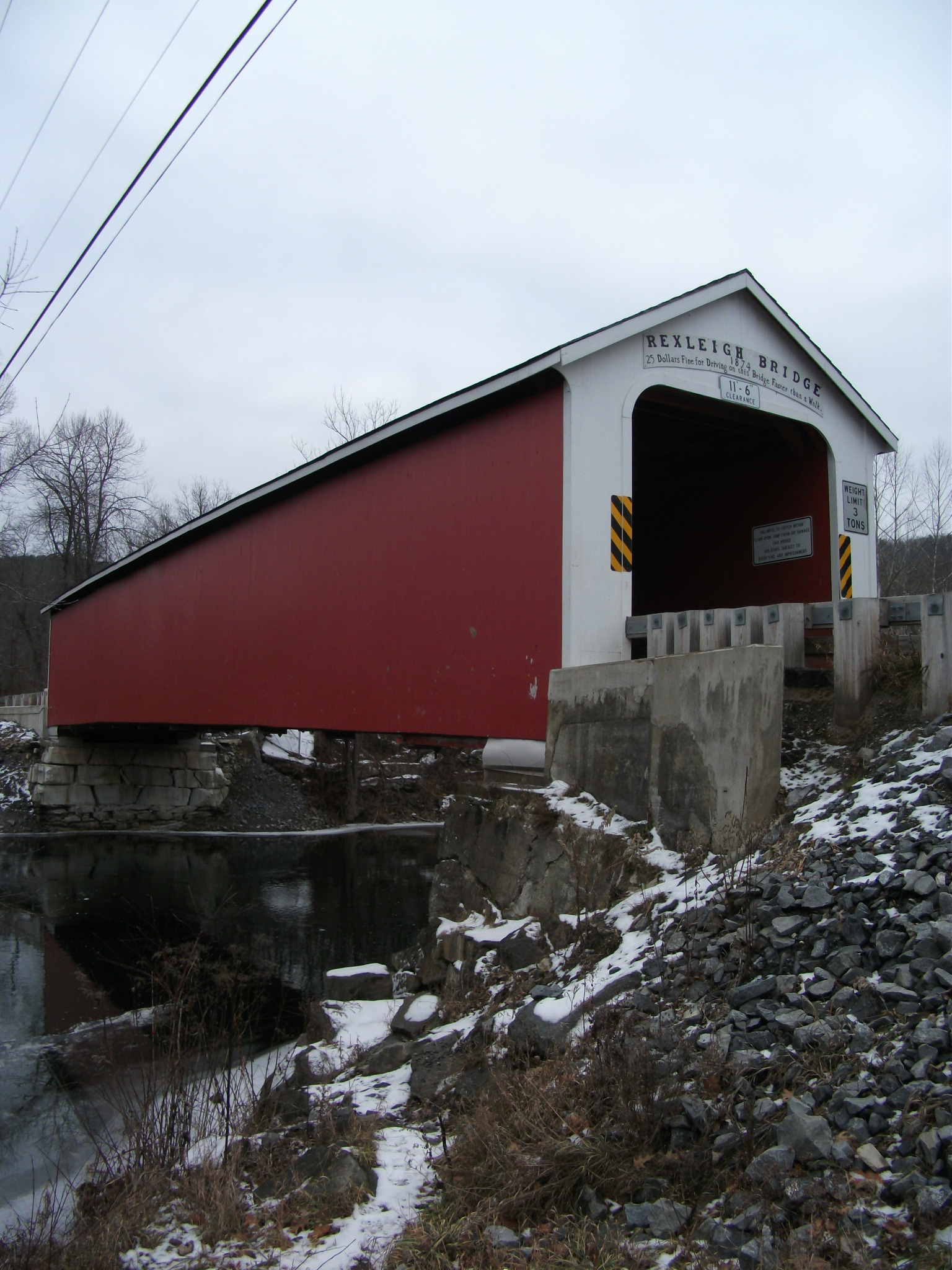
- Rexleigh Bridge

- Location in Washington County and the state of New York.
- Coordinates: 43°5′50″N 73°22′39″W
- Country: United States
- State: New York
- County: Washington

Area
  - Total: 37.56 sq mi (97.29 km^{2})
  - Land: 37.16 sq mi (96.24 km^{2})
  - Water: 0.41 sq mi (1.05 km^{2})
- Elevation: 554 ft (169 m)

Population (2010)
  - Total: 1,800
  - Estimate (2016): 1,760
  - Density: 47.4/sq mi (18.29/km^{2})
- Time zone: UTC-5 (Eastern (EST))
  - Summer (DST): UTC-4 (EDT)
- Area code: 518
- FIPS code: 36-38143
- GNIS feature ID: 0979101
- Website: https://www.townofjacksonny.gov/

Jackson is a town in southeastern Washington County, New York, United States. It is part of the Glens Falls Metropolitan Statistical Area.

== History ==
The town was formed from part of the town of Cambridge in 1815. Cambridge Valley Livestock is the longest running business in the town.

In March 2010, the Town Board passed a law making English the only language to be used for town business and municipal work, and is considering a law making English the town's official language.

The Rexleigh Covered Bridge and Maxwell Farm are listed on the National Register of Historic Places.

== Geography ==
According to the United States Census Bureau, the town has a total area of 37.5 square miles (97 km^{2}), of which 37.2 square miles (96 km^{2}) is land and 0.3 square miles (0.78 km^{2}) (0.83%) is water.

Much of the northern town line is defined by the Batten Kill, a tributary of the Hudson River. The eastern town line is the state border with Vermont.

NY Route 22 is a north-south highway through the middle of Jackson. NY Route 313 crosses the town toward Vermont.

== Demographics ==
Historical population
Census	Pop.	Note	%±
1820	2,004		—
1830	2,054		2.5%
1840	1,730		−15.8%
1850	2,129		23.1%
1860	1,863		−12.5%
1870	1,662		−10.8%
1880	1,562		−6.0%
1890	1,278		−18.2%
1900	1,059		−17.1%
1910	985		−7.0%
1920	836		−15.1%
1930	822		−1.7%
1940	798		−2.9%
1950	857		7.4%
1960	795		−7.2%
1970	941		18.4%
1980	1,228		30.5%
1990	1,581		28.7%
2000	1,718		8.7%
2010	1,800		4.8%
2020	1,717		−4.6%
2024 (est.)	1,707		−0.6%
U.S. Decennial Census

As of the census of 2000, there were 1,718 people, 692 households, and 489 families residing in the town. The population density was 46.2 inhabitants per square mile (17.8/km^{2}). There were 1,077 housing units at an average density of 29.0 per square mile (11.2/km^{2}). The racial makeup of the town was 97.26% White, 0.81% African American, 0.17% Native American, 0.47% Asian, 0.06% Pacific Islander, 0.06% from other races, and 1.16% from two or more races. Hispanic or Latino of any race were 1.11% of the population.

There were 692 households, out of which 31.5% had children under the age of 18 living with them, 57.4% were married couples living together, 9.7% had a female householder with no husband present, and 29.3% were non-families. 23.7% of all households were made up of individuals, and 11.3% had someone living alone who was 65 years of age or older. The average household size was 2.47 and the average family size was 2.90.

In the town, the population was spread out, with 25.6% under the age of 18, 4.5% from 18 to 24, 27.5% from 25 to 44, 25.8% from 45 to 64, and 16.7% who were 65 years of age or older. The median age was 40 years. For every 100 females, there were 97.7 males. For every 100 females age 18 and over, there were 96.5 males.

The median income for a household in the town was $41,490, and the median income for a family was $43,565. Males had a median income of $33,438 versus $21,290 for females. The per capita income for the town was $19,473. About 5.3% of families and 9.6% of the population were below the poverty line, including 9.7% of those under age 18 and 9.2% of those age 65 or over.

== Communities and locations in Jackson ==
=== Communities ===
- Anaquassacook – a location on NY-313 in the eastern part of Jackson.
- Eagleville – a hamlet in the eastern part of Jackson by the Batten Kill, mostly in the Town of Salem
- The Plains – a location in the southeastern part of the town, east of Chapin Field.
- Chapin Field (1B8) – an airport near the southern town line, with two intersecting grass strip runways.
- Shushan – a hamlet at the Batten Kill on County Road 61, mostly in the Town of Salem.
- Battenville, New York – a small hamlet, mostly in the Town of Greenwich.

=== Geographical locations ===
- Cambridge Creek – A stream in the eastern part of Jackson.
- Clark Pond – A small lake north of Hedges Lake.
- Dead Lake – A small lake west of NY-22, south of Hedges Lake.
- Eldgridge Swamp – A swamp north of The Plains.
- Hedges Lake – A lake in the middle of the town, west of NY-22.
- Lake Lauderdale – A lake in the middle of the town, east of NY-22.
- Mount Colfax – An elevation south of Hedges Lake.
- Owl Kill – A stream flowing out of Lake Lauderdale.
- Schoolhouse Lake – A lake north of Lake Lauderdale.
