= Shushan Bridge =

- Shushan Covered Bridge
- U.S. National Register of Historic Places
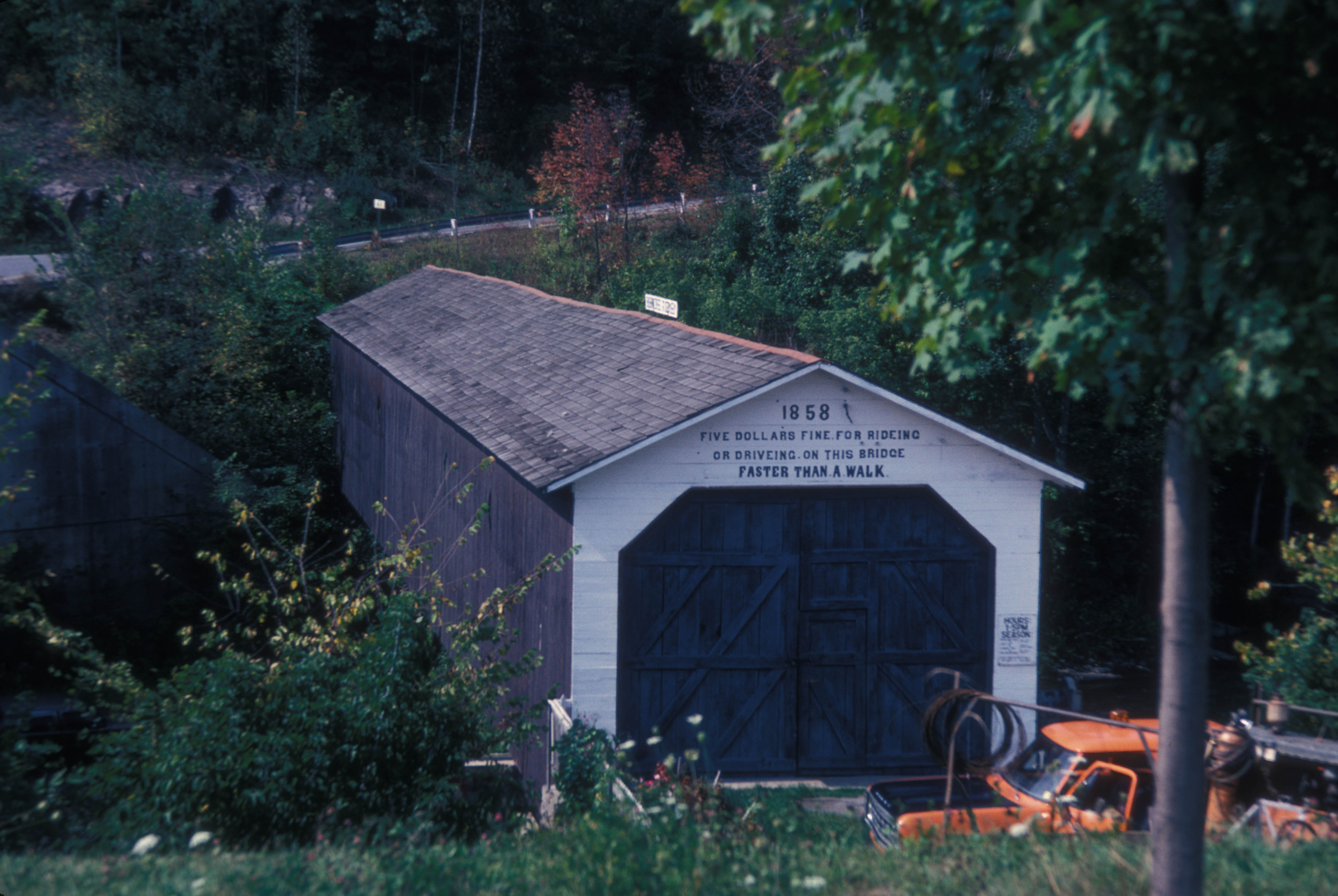

- Location within New York Location within the United States
- Location: Spans Batten Kill off NY 22, Shushan, New York
- Coordinates: 43°5′28″N 73°20′45″W
- Area: 1 acre (0.40 ha)
- Built: 1858
- Architect: Stevens, Milton
- Architectural style: Town lattice plank truss
- MPS: Covered Bridges of Washington County TR / Buskirk, Rexleigh, Eagleville, and Shushan Covered Bridges
- NRHP reference No.: 78003460
- Added to NRHP: March 8, 1978

Shushan Bridge is a covered bridge over the Batten Kill in the hamlet of Shushan in Washington County, New York, near Vermont. It is one of 29 surviving historic covered bridges in New York State and one of 4 surviving in Washington County.

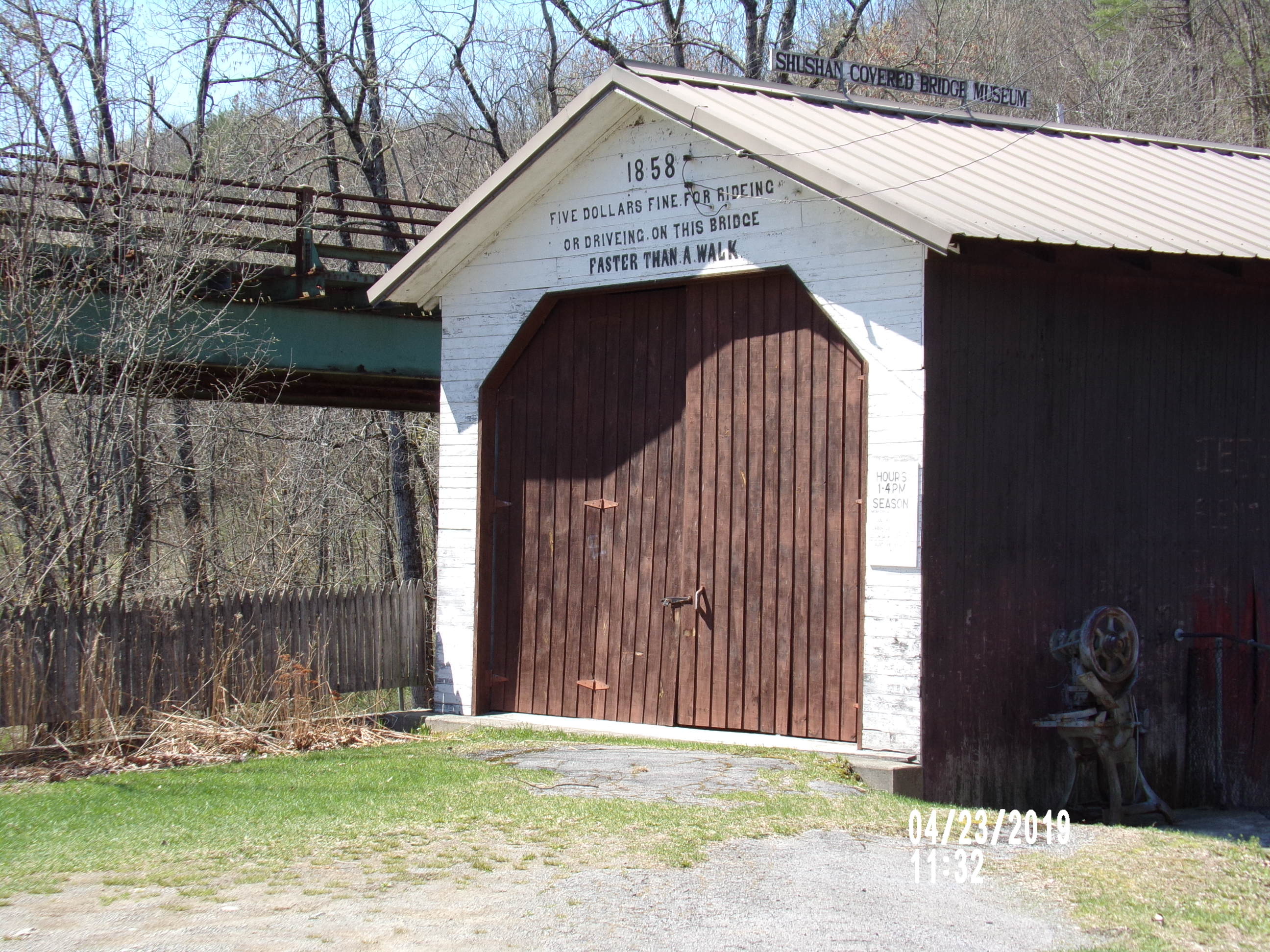
Shushan bridge

It was built in 1858 by builder Milton Stevens.

Town and Howe truss designs were patented by Ithiel Town in 1820 and William Howe in 1840, respectively. The Shushan Bridge employs "the patented Town lattice truss, consisting of top and bottom chords of laminated wood plank, and a web of diagonal wood planks connected by wood trunnels at each point of intersection".

It was individually inventoried by the New York State Office of Parks, Recreation and Historic Preservation in 1977.

It is one of four Washington County covered bridges submitted for listing in the National Register of Historic Places in one multiple property submission. The others are the Buskirk Bridge, the Rexleigh Bridge, and the Eagleville Bridge. All four were listed on the National Register of Historic Places on March 8, 1972.

The Shushan bridge was closed to traffic in 1962, and was left abandoned for 10 years, then saved by local preservation efforts. Now it is operated as a seasonal museum.
