= Shushan, New York =

Hamlet in New York, United States

Coordinates: 43°05′25″N 73°20′34″W

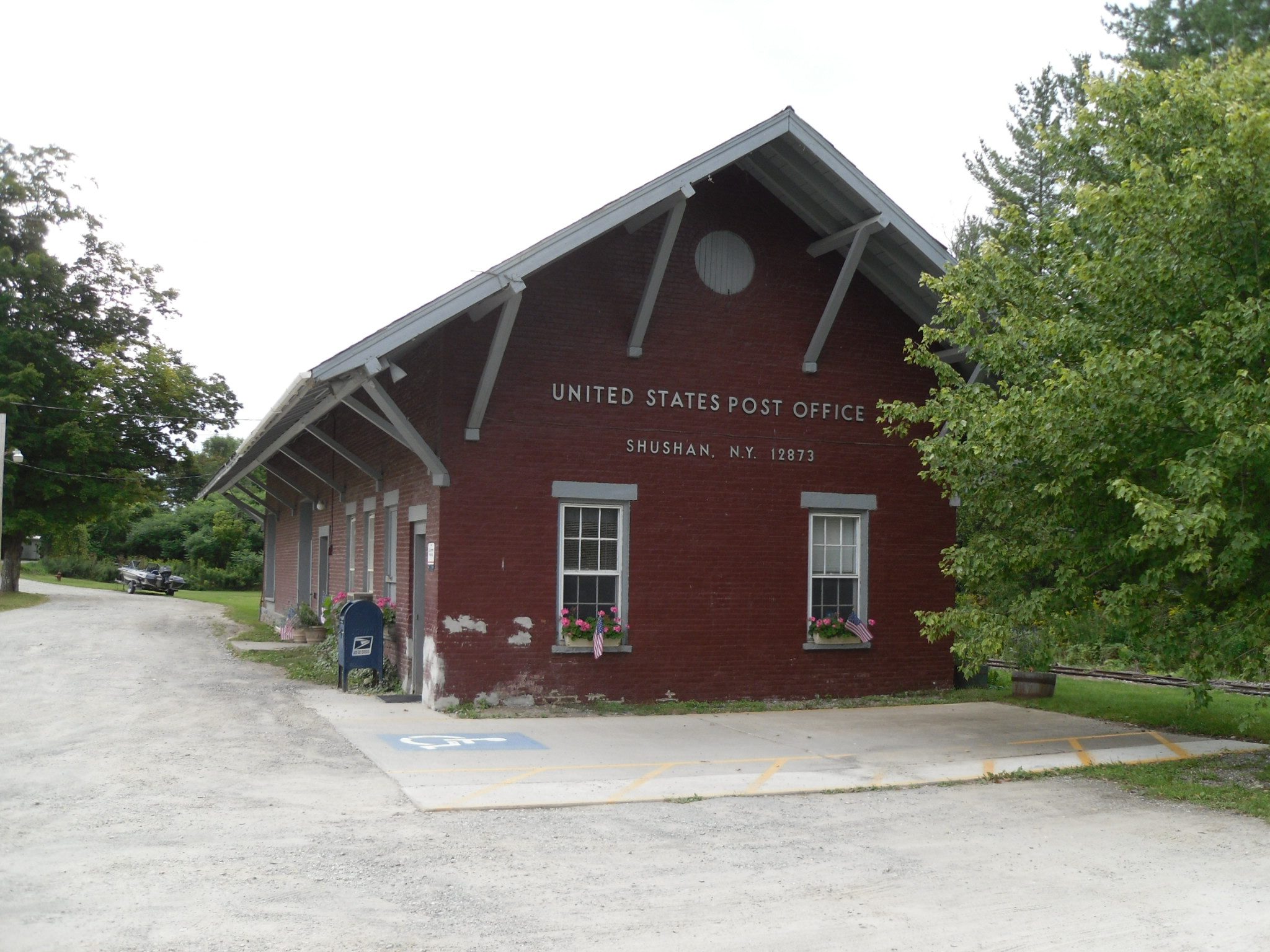
The former United States Post Office in Shushan in August 2010, located in the former Delaware and Hudson Railway depot

Shushan is a hamlet in the town of Salem in Washington County, New York, United States. It is in the eastern region of the state, located four miles west of the Vermont border. Its ZIP code is 12873.

Among Shushan's attractions is the Shushan Bridge, constructed in 1858.

The hamlet is named after Susa or Shush which is an ancient city in Iran.

== Notable people ==
- The classical saxophonist Sigurd Raschèr owned a farm in Shushan, and died there in 2001.
- Grey Villet, a photojournalist with Life magazine, lived in Shushan in the second half of the 20th century and died there in 2000.
