= Washington County, New York =

County in New York, United States

- County
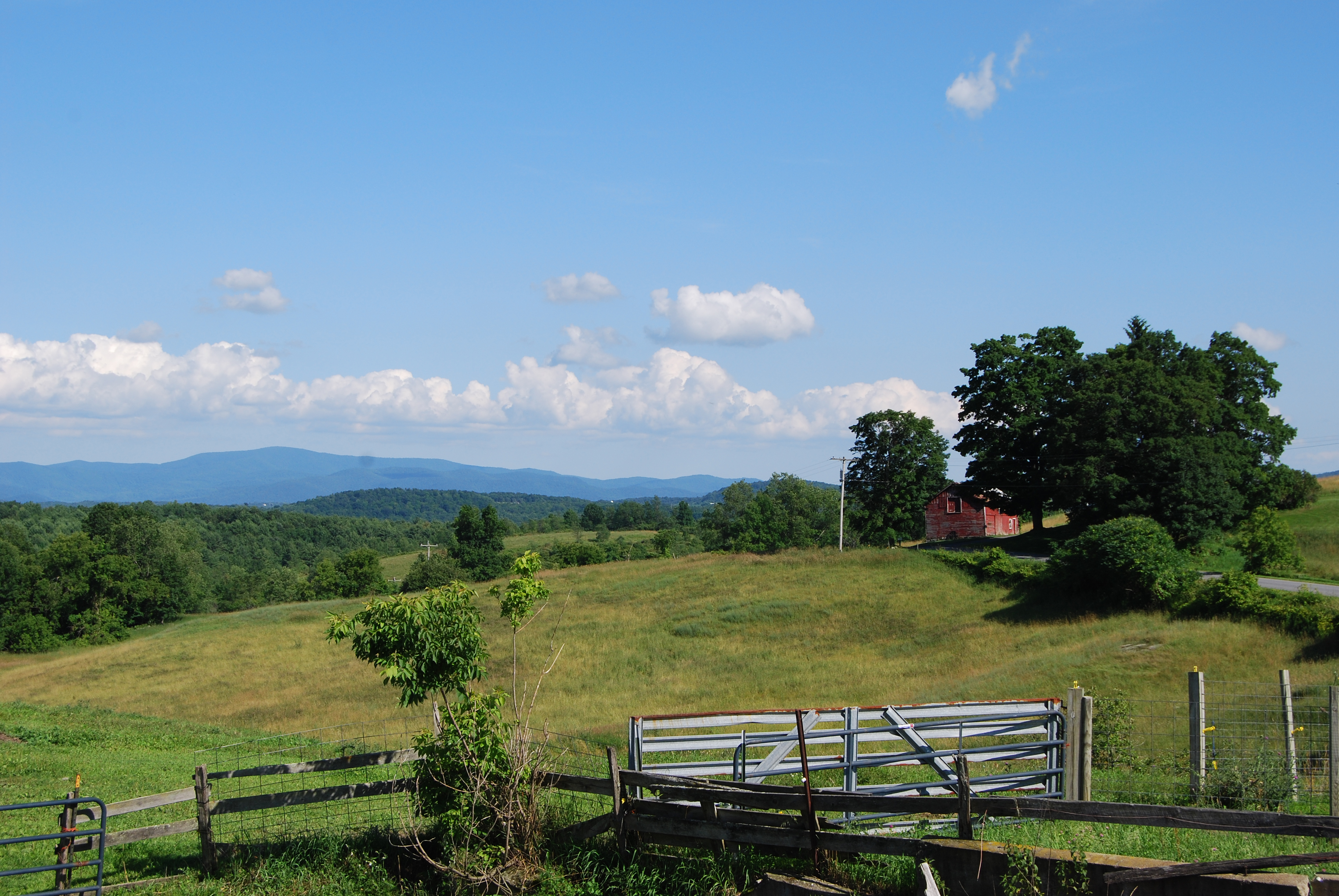
- A farm in Greenwich

- Flag Seal

- Location within the U.S. state of New York
- Coordinates: 43°18′N 73°24′W
- Country: United States
- State: New York
- Founded: March 12, 1772; 254 years ago (Note: "Washington County, or Charlotte County, to give it the title under which it was erected, March 12, 1772, comprised a great slice of Northern New York, mostly west of Lake Champlain, reaching from the Hudson to Canada, a distance of more than 100 miles, extending westward a width of fifty. The name was changed to the present nomenclature April 2, 1784, and there began but a few years later a series of reductions in its area. Clinton County was set off in 1788; the east portion ceded to Vermont in 1790; and Warren was taken from the north part in 1813.) (Took its name on April 2, 1784)
- Named for: George Washington
- Seat: Fort Edward
- Largest village: Hudson Falls

Area
  - Total: 846 sq mi (2,190 km^{2})
  - Land: 831 sq mi (2,150 km^{2})
  - Water: 15 sq mi (39 km^{2}) 1.7%

Population (2020)
  - Total: 61,302
  - Estimate (2025): 59,353 ▼
  - Density: 73.8/sq mi (28.5/km^{2})
- Time zone: UTC−5 (Eastern)
  - Summer (DST): UTC−4 (EDT)
- Congressional district: 21st
- Website: www.washingtoncountyny.gov

Washington County is a county in the U.S. state of New York. As of the 2020 census, the population was 61,302. The county seat is Fort Edward. The county was named for U.S. President George Washington. The county is part of the Capital District region of the state.

== History ==
When counties were established in the colony of New York in 1683, the present Washington County was part of Albany County. This was an enormous county, including the northern part of New York State as well as all of the present state of Vermont and, in theory, extending westward to the Pacific Ocean. This county was reduced in size on July 3, 1766, by the creation of Cumberland County, and further on March 16, 1770, by the creation of Gloucester County, both containing territory now in Vermont.

On March 12, 1772, what was left of Albany County was split into three parts, one remaining under the name Albany County. The other two were called Tryon County (later renamed Montgomery County) and Charlotte County.

On April 2, 1784, Charlotte County was renamed Washington County in honor of George Washington, the American Revolutionary War general and later President of the United States of America.

In 1788, Clinton County was split off from Washington County. This was a much larger area than the present Clinton County, including several other counties or county parts of the present New York State.

In 1791, the Town of Cambridge was transferred from Albany County to Washington County.

In 1813, Warren County was split off from Washington County.

In 1994, with the completion of the new municipal center, the county seat was moved from Hudson Falls to Fort Edward.

In 2006, Cambridge Town Supervisor Jo Ann Trinkle made history by being elected as the first chairwoman of the Board of Supervisors.

=== Historic sites ===
Washington County has four historic covered bridges, each listed on the National Register of Historic Places:

- Buskirk Bridge
- Eagleville Bridge
- Rexleigh Bridge
- Shushan Bridge

Including those, it has a total of 35 sites listed on the National Register. The Lemuel Haynes House is designated as a National Historic Landmark, the highest level of significance.

== Geography ==
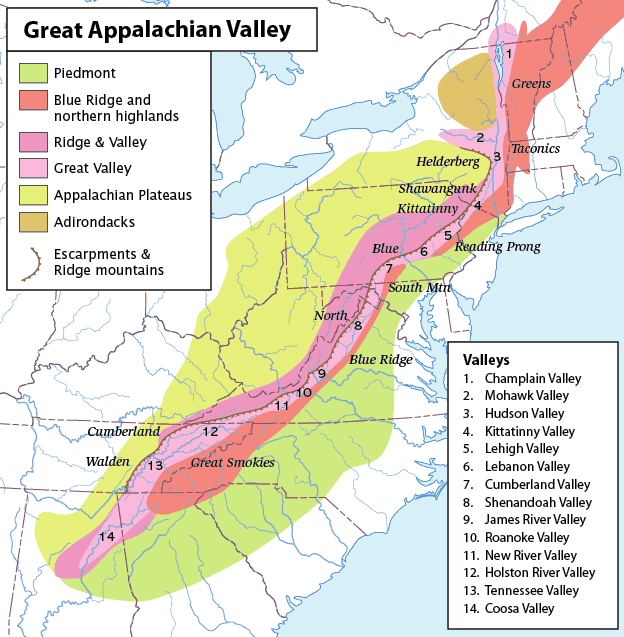
A map of the Appalachian Mountains, highlighting the Great Appalachian Valley. The main mountain regions on either side are named, as are the various local valleys.

According to the U.S. Census Bureau, the county has a total area of 846 square miles (2,190 km^{2}), of which 831 square miles (2,150 km^{2}) is land and 15 square miles (39 km^{2}) (1.7%) is water.

Washington County is a long narrow county located in the northeastern section of the State. It is known for its rich valley farm land and is part of the Great Appalachian Valley (also known simply as the 'Great Valley') which is a long narrow valley strip often between tall mountain ranges. The county transitions from the Taconic Mountains to the Adirondack Mountains, and from the Lake Champlain Valley to Hudson River Valley.

Much of the county is part of the slate valley of the Upper Taconic Mountains (Taghkanic, meaning 'in the trees'). The eastern boundary of Washington County is the New York–Vermont border, part of which is Lake Champlain. This is also the border with New England proper. The northern end of the county is within the 6.1 million acre Adirondack Park. Western boundaries include primarily the Hudson River and Lake George.

Washington County belongs to the following valleys and watersheds: Champlain Valley / Lake George Watershed—02010001 Hudson River Valley / Hudson-Hoosic Watershed—02020003 Waters in the northern part drain into Lake Champlain via Lake George (Horican) or the Mettawee River, and then flow into the Saint Lawrence River (Kaniatarowanenneh). These waters mingle in the Saint Lawrence with waters of all the Great Lakes as they flow northeast into the Gulf of Saint Lawrence, and ultimately join the Atlantic Ocean. Meanwhile, the remainder of waters drain south via the Hudson River (Muh-he-kun-ne-tuk or Muhheakantuck), and ultimately flow south into the Atlantic Ocean below New York City. See the approximation of the watershed divide mapped in context of mountains and valleys.

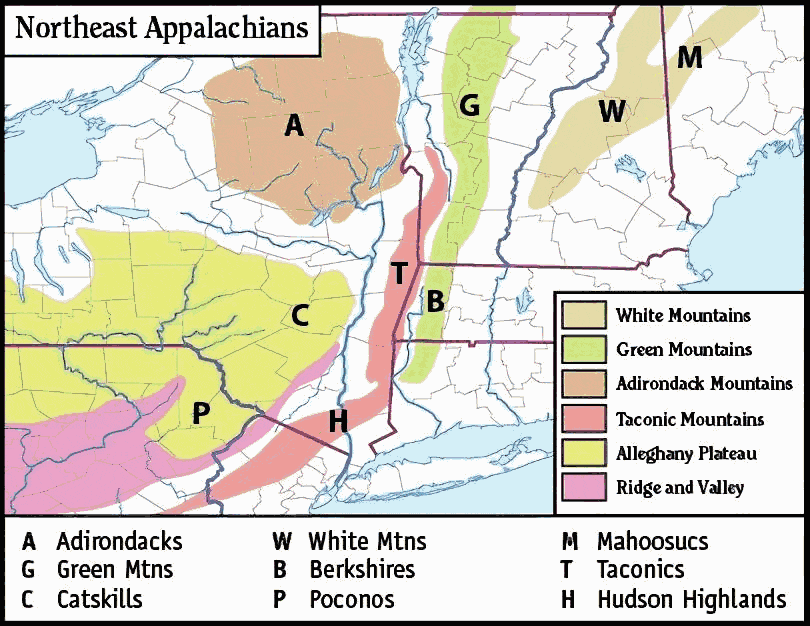
Orogenies of the northeast United States

Nearly half of its borders are by long bodies of water. Winding across the bottom of the county is the legendary Batten Kill (Dionondehowa), famous for its worldclass flyfishing, and its marvelous falls (near the Washington County fairgrounds).

Black Mountain, in the Adirondacks, is the tallest peak in Washington County at approximately 2,640 feet (800 meters), and has beautiful views of Lake George, Lake Champlain, the surrounding countryside, and the Adirondacks, Taconic Mountains and Green Mountains. Willard Mountain is a ski center in the southern part of the county.

=== Adjacent counties ===
- Essex County – north
- Addison County, Vermont – northeast
- Rutland County, Vermont – east
- Bennington County, Vermont – southeast
- Rensselaer County – south
- Saratoga County – southwest
- Warren County – west

== Demographics ==
Historical population
Census	Pop.	Note	%±
1790	14,077		—
1800	35,574		152.7%
1810	44,289		24.5%
1820	38,831		−12.3%
1830	42,635		9.8%
1840	41,080		−3.6%
1850	44,750		8.9%
1860	45,904		2.6%
1870	49,568		8.0%
1880	47,871		−3.4%
1890	45,690		−4.6%
1900	45,624		−0.1%
1910	47,778		4.7%
1920	44,888		−6.0%
1930	46,482		3.6%
1940	46,726		0.5%
1950	47,144		0.9%
1960	48,476		2.8%
1970	52,725		8.8%
1980	54,795		3.9%
1990	59,330		8.3%
2000	61,042		2.9%
2010	63,216		3.6%
2020	61,302		−3.0%
2025 (est.)	59,353	▼	−3.2%
U.S. Decennial Census; 1790-1960 1900-1990; 1990-2000 2010-2020

=== 2020 census ===
Washington County, New York – Racial and ethnic composition Note: the US Census treats Hispanic/Latino as an ethnic category. This table excludes Latinos from the racial categories and assigns them to a separate category. Hispanics/Latinos may be of any race.
Race / Ethnicity (NH = Non-Hispanic)	Pop 1980	Pop 1990	Pop 2000	Pop 2010	Pop 2020	% 1980	% 1990	% 2000	% 2010	% 2020
White alone (NH)	53,132	56,097	57,378	58,996	54,605	96.97%	94.55%	94.00%	93.32%	89.08%
Black or African American alone (NH)	893	1,712	1,703	1,734	1,563	1.63%	2.89%	2.79%	2.74%	2.55%
Native American or Alaska Native alone (NH)	59	93	101	109	149	0.11%	0.16%	0.17%	0.17%	0.24%
Asian alone (NH)	74	109	168	260	319	0.14%	0.18%	0.28%	0.41%	0.52%
Native Hawaiian or Pacific Islander alone (NH)	x	x	8	11	22	x	x	0.01%	0.02%	0.04%
Other race alone (NH)	33	6	35	81	143	0.06%	0.01%	0.06%	0.13%	0.23%
Mixed race or Multiracial (NH)	x	x	417	579	2,740	x	x	0.68%	0.92%	4.47%
Hispanic or Latino (any race)	604	1,313	1,232	1,446	1,761	1.10%	2.21%	2.02%	2.29%	2.87%
Total	54,795	59,330	61,042	63,216	61,302	100.00%	100.00%	100.00%	100.00%	100.00%

=== 2000 census ===
As of the census of 2000, there were 61,042 people, 22,458 households, and 15,787 families residing in the county. The population density was 73 inhabitants per square mile (28/km^{2}). There were 26,794 housing units at an average density of 32 units per square mile (12/km^{2}). The racial makeup of the county was 94.97% White, 2.92% Black or African American, 0.20% Native American, 0.28% Asian, 0.01% Pacific Islander, 0.84% from other races, and 0.77% from two or more races. 2.02% of the population were Hispanic or Latino of any race. 17.5% were of Irish, 14.1% French, 12.1% English, 11.1% American, 9.0% Italian and 7.7% German ancestry according to Census 2000. 96.9% spoke English and 1.4% Spanish as their first language.

There were 22,458 households, out of which 33.20% had children under the age of 18 living with them, 55.20% were married couples living together, 10.40% had a female householder with no husband present, and 29.70% were non-families. 24.00% of all households were made up of individuals, and 10.80% had someone living alone who was 65 years of age or older. The average household size was 2.55 and the average family size was 3.01.

In the county, the population was spread out, with 24.60% under the age of 18, 8.30% from 18 to 24, 29.40% from 25 to 44, 23.70% from 45 to 64, and 14.00% who were 65 years of age or older. The median age was 38 years. For every 100 females there were 105.20 males. For every 100 females age 18 and over, there were 104.50 males.

The median income for a household in the county was $37,668, and the median income for a family was $43,500. Males had a median income of $31,537 versus $22,160 for females. The per capita income for the county was $17,958. About 6.80% of families and 9.40% of the population were below the poverty line, including 12.30% of those under age 18 and 7.30% of those age 65 or over.

== Government ==
The county government consists of a board of supervisors with weighted votes. Each town supervisor holds a seat on the county government, and their votes are based on the population of their town, with Kingsbury and Fort Edward supervisors having the largest number of votes, and Putnam having the fewest votes. The 2017 weighted vote totals are available on the county website.

== Politics ==
Gubernatorial elections results

Gubernatorial elections results
Year	Republican	Democratic	Third parties
2022	63.96% 14,155	35.91% 7,946	0.13% 29
2018	62.76% 12,879	31.24% 6,411	6.00% 1,232
2014	58.26% 8,699	32.59% 4,866	9.15% 1,367
2010	42.03% 7,669	51.98% 9,485	5.99% 1,093
2006	38.62% 7,024	59.51% 10,822	1.87% 340
2002	56.50% 9,491	22.42% 3,767	21.07% 3,541

Prior to 1996, Washington County was a Republican stronghold, with the only time between 1884 and 1992 that a Republican presidential candidate failed to win the county being 1964 when Barry Goldwater lost every county in New York in his statewide and national landslide loss. Since 1996, it has become a bellwether county, but Republican candidate margins of victory have been greater than those by Democratic candidates and broke its bellwether streak in 2020 when Donald Trump won the county. In his 2020 performance, Trump received the highest percentage of the vote for a Republican since 1988 when George H. W. Bush received 62 percent, proceeding to expand his success further four years later. No Democrat aside from Lyndon B. Johnson in the aforementioned 1964 election has managed to win majority of the county's votes.

United States presidential election results for Washington County, New York
Year	Republican		Democratic		Third party(ies)	
Year	No.	%	No.	%	No.	%
1884	7,337	61.51%	4,222	35.39%	370	3.10%
1888	8,023	63.21%	4,284	33.75%	386	3.04%
1892	6,794	59.54%	3,731	32.70%	885	7.76%
1896	8,139	69.12%	3,239	27.51%	397	3.37%
1900	8,209	68.34%	3,357	27.95%	446	3.71%
1904	8,324	67.37%	3,517	28.47%	514	4.16%
1908	7,933	65.63%	3,593	29.73%	561	4.64%
1912	4,593	40.94%	3,555	31.68%	3,072	27.38%
1916	7,310	63.77%	3,907	34.08%	246	2.15%
1920	13,647	75.43%	4,124	22.79%	322	1.78%
1924	13,774	71.50%	4,321	22.43%	1,169	6.07%
1928	15,499	66.91%	7,221	31.17%	443	1.91%
1932	14,478	65.26%	7,512	33.86%	194	0.87%
1936	15,186	65.13%	7,713	33.08%	418	1.79%
1940	15,960	66.57%	7,977	33.27%	38	0.16%
1944	13,861	66.03%	7,100	33.82%	31	0.15%
1948	13,975	68.29%	6,017	29.40%	472	2.31%
1952	17,551	73.80%	6,210	26.11%	22	0.09%
1956	18,449	79.30%	4,817	20.70%	0	0.00%
1960	15,037	64.49%	8,274	35.48%	6	0.03%
1964	8,160	37.10%	13,826	62.87%	7	0.03%
1968	12,694	61.71%	6,806	33.09%	1,069	5.20%
1972	16,136	73.80%	5,677	25.97%	51	0.23%
1976	13,946	65.40%	7,262	34.06%	116	0.54%
1980	12,835	58.59%	7,144	32.61%	1,927	8.80%
1984	16,580	73.48%	5,909	26.19%	74	0.33%
1988	14,103	62.64%	8,201	36.42%	211	0.94%
1992	10,305	41.00%	8,429	33.53%	6,401	25.47%
1996	8,954	39.72%	9,572	42.46%	4,018	17.82%
2000	12,596	53.47%	9,641	40.93%	1,318	5.60%
2004	13,827	55.08%	10,624	42.32%	652	2.60%
2008	12,533	48.71%	12,741	49.52%	456	1.77%
2012	11,085	48.00%	11,523	49.89%	487	2.11%
2016	13,610	55.49%	9,098	37.09%	1,820	7.42%
2020	15,941	56.65%	11,565	41.10%	632	2.25%
2024	17,268	60.13%	11,224	39.09%	224	0.78%

== Transportation ==
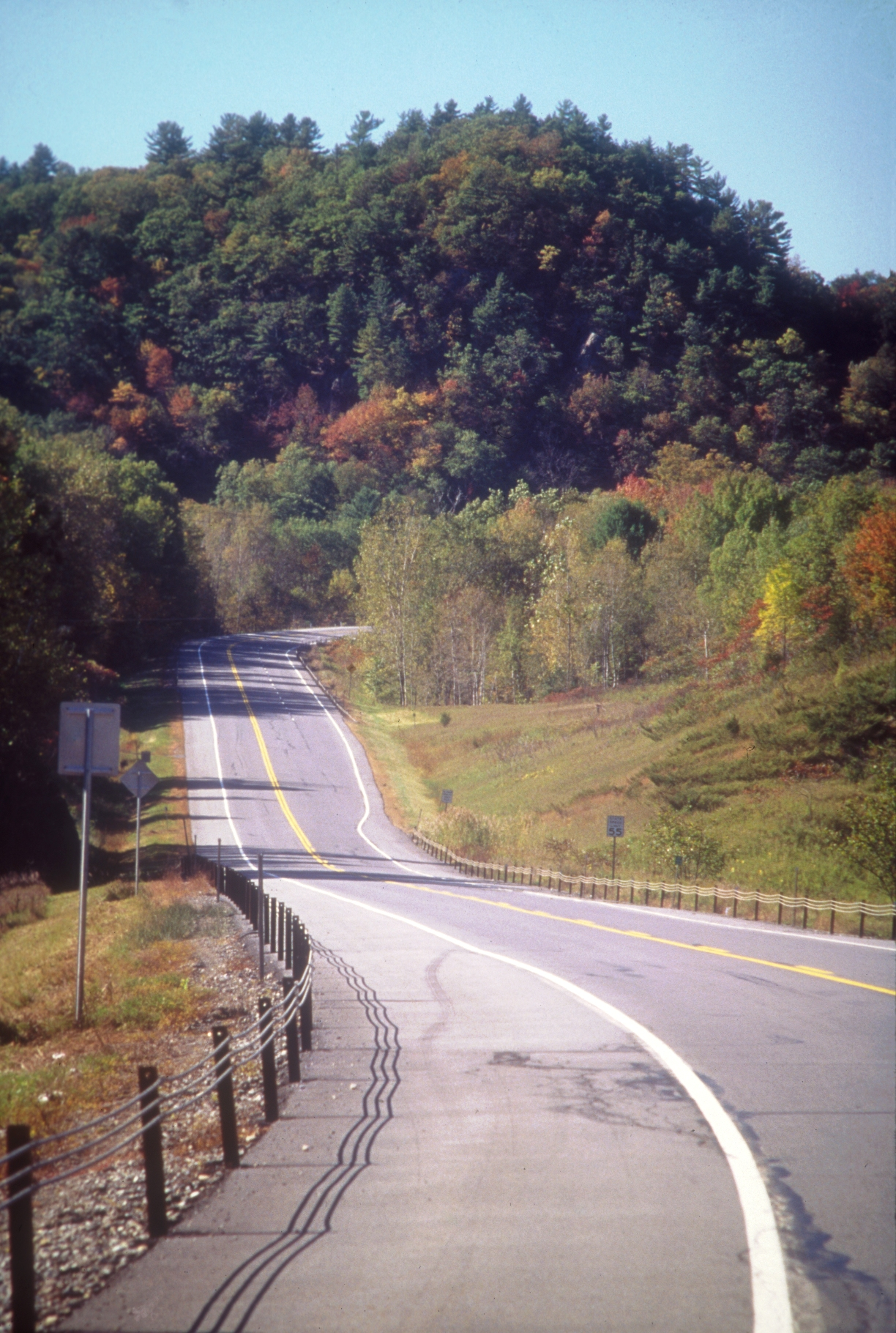
New York State Route 22 passing through Washington County

=== Roads ===
- US 4
- NY 22
- NY 22A
- NY 29
- NY 32
- NY 32B
- NY 40
- NY 67
- NY 149
- NY 196
- NY 197
- NY 254
- NY 273
- NY 313
- Former NY 338 (now CR 49)
- NY 372

=== Airports ===
The following public use airports are located in the county:

- Argyle Airport (1C3) – Argyle
- Chapin Field (1B8) – Cambridge
- Granville Airport (B01) – Granville

=== Rail ===
Amtrak's Adirondack and Ethan Allen Express services each travel through Washington County once a day in each direction on their routes between New York, New York and Montreal, Québec or Burlington, Vermont, respectively. Both routes stop in Fort Edward and the Adirondack additionally serves Whitehall. The Adirondack was temporarily suspended from March 2020 through early April 2023 due to the closure of the Canadian/American border in response to the COVID-19 pandemic and related logistical challenges.

== Communities ==
=== Towns ===
- Argyle
- Cambridge
- Dresden
- Easton
- Fort Ann
- Fort Edward (county seat)
- Granville
- Greenwich
- Hampton
- Hartford
- Hebron
- Jackson
- Kingsbury
- Putnam
- Salem
- White Creek
- Whitehall

=== Villages ===
- Argyle
- Cambridge
- Fort Ann
- Fort Edward
- Granville
- Greenwich
- Hudson Falls
- Whitehall

=== Census-designated places ===
- North Granville
- Salem

=== Hamlets ===
- Cossayuna
- East Greenwich
- East Lake George
- Goose Island
- Huletts Landing
- Kattskill Bay
- Shushan

== Notable people ==
- Frank Buckley Walker, a talent agent who discovered the likes of Bessie Smith and Hank Williams.
- Townsend Harris, the first United States Consul-General to Japan.
- Chester A. Arthur – Lived in Greenwich/Union Village for five years in his youth before becoming 21st President of the United States in 1881.
- Grandma Moses, American painter
- Josh Carter, musician in American music duo Phantogram
- Susan B. Anthony (February 15, 1820 – March 13, 1906) was a prominent American civil rights leader who played a pivotal role in the 19th-century women's rights movement to gain women's suffrage in the United States. She moved with her family to Battenville, New York when she was six.
- Solomon Northup was a free-born African American fiddler who had a farm in Hebron before moving to Saratoga Springs. Kidnapped in 1841 and sold into slavery in Louisiana, he was freed in 1853, and that year published his memoir Twelve Years a Slave (1853). In 1984, the memoir was adapted as a PBS television movie entitled Solomon Northup's Odyssey, directed by Gordon Parks; in 2013 it was adapted as a feature movie 12 Years a Slave (film).
- Sigurd Raschèr (pronounced 'Rah-sher') (May 15, 1907, in Elberfeld, Germany – February 25, 2001, in Shushan, New York) was an American saxophonist of German birth. He became one of the most important figures in the development of the 20th century repertoire for the concert saxophone.
- James Howard Kunstler (b. October 19, 1948). Author of The Geography of Nowhere, The Long Emergency, and the World Made By Hand novel series.
- Frank J. Kimball, Wisconsin State Assemblyman, was born in Washington County.
- Curtis Mann, Wisconsin State Senator, was born in Washington County.
- E. D. Rogers, Wisconsin State Assembly, was born in Washington County.
- John L. Beveridge, 16th governor of Illinois (January 23, 1873 – January 8, 1877), 18th lieutenant governor of Illinois (January 13, 1873 – January 23, 1873), member from Illinois of the U.S. House of Representatives, (42nd Congress), Republican Party, born in town of Greenwich in Washington County on July 6, 1824
- James M. Hinds (December 5, 1833 – October 22, 1868) was born and raised in the town of Hebron in Washington County. He served in the U.S. House of Representatives from July to October 1868 representing the 2nd Congressional District of Arkansas as a Republican. He became the first congressional representative to be assassinated while in office after being targeted by the Ku Klux Klan for advocating for civil rights for former slaves. He is buried in Salem's Evergreen Cemetery.

== See also ==
- List of counties in New York
- National Register of Historic Places listings in Washington County, New York
