= Gorham Covered Bridge =

- U.S. National Register of Historic Places
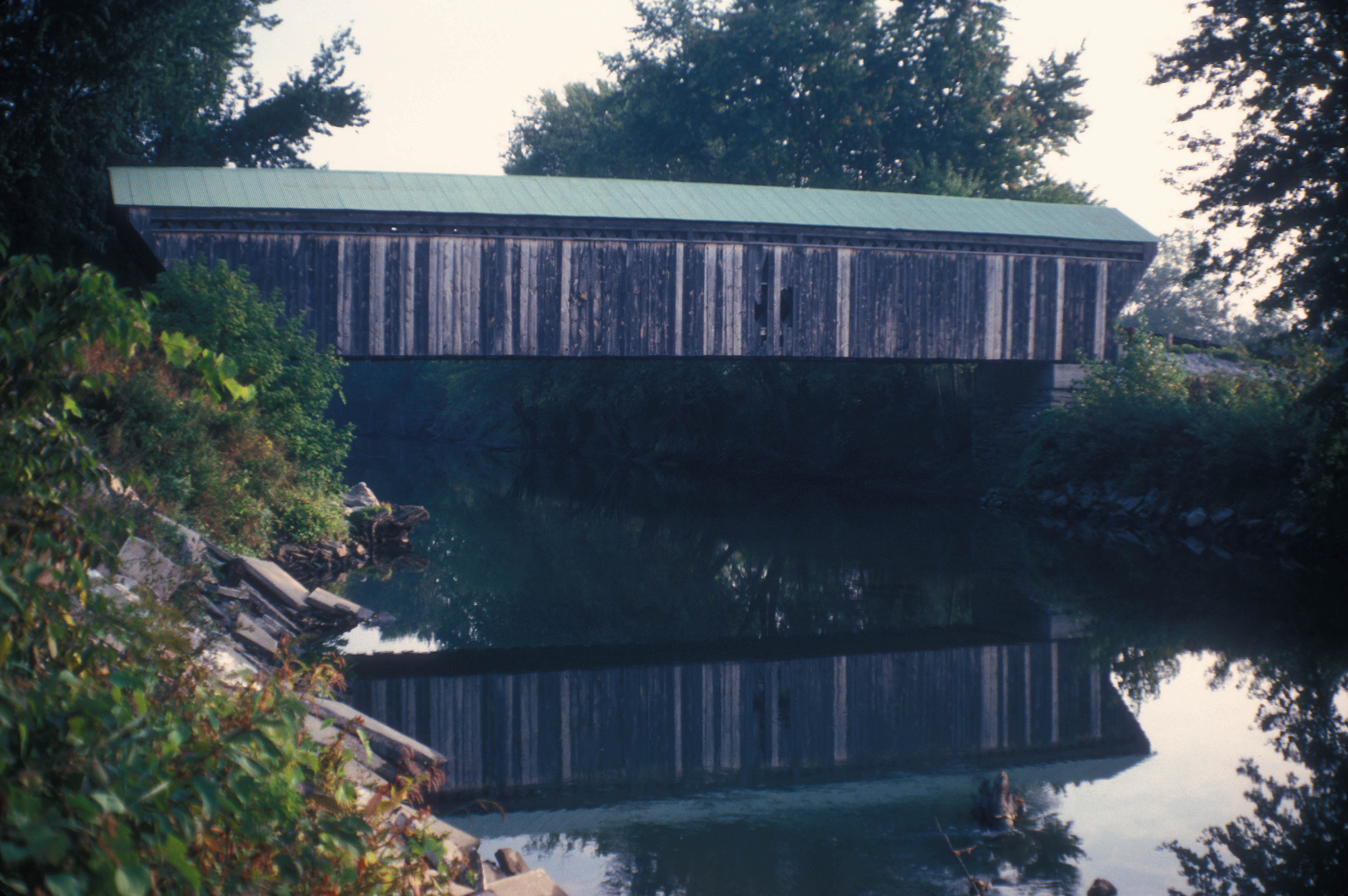

- Location within Vermont Location within the United States
- Location: Gorham Bridge Road, Pittsford and Proctor, Vermont
- Coordinates: 43°40′48″N 73°2′17″W
- Area: 1 acre (0.40 ha)
- Built: 1841
- Built by: Abraham Owen, Nicholas M. Powers
- Architectural style: Town lattice truss
- NRHP reference No.: 74000255
- Added to NRHP: February 12, 1974

The Gorham Covered Bridge carries Gorham Bridge Road across Otter Creek in a rural area of Pittsford and Proctor, Vermont. It is a Town lattice truss bridge, built in 1841 by Abraham Owen and Nicholas M. Powers, the latter in the early stages of his career as a well-known bridgewright. The bridge was listed on the National Register of Historic Places in 1974.

== Description and history ==
The Gorham Covered Bridge joins northern Proctor and southern Pittsford, both rural communities in central-northern Rutland County, Vermont. It carries Gorham Bridge Road across Otter Creek, a minor side road which forms the town boundary at that point. The bridge is oriented east–west across the north-flowing creek. It is a single span Town lattice truss, 114 feet (35 m) in length, resting on stone abutments that have been faced in concrete. The bridge has been strengthened by the addition of laminated beams below the road deck, which is 18 feet (5.5 m) wide. The bridge's exterior is sheathed in vertical board siding, which ends short of the roof line, and is topped by a gabled roof now covered in corrugated metal. The siding extends around the sides to the portal faces, and a short way inside the portals.

The bridge was built in 1841, and is one of Vermont's oldest surviving covered bridges. It was built by Abraham Owen and Nicholas M. Powers, the latter then an apprentice to Owen. Powers, A Vermont native, was one of the best-known 19th-century bridgewrights, credited with a large number of covered bridges. At the time of this bridge's listing on the National Register in 1974, it was one of three surviving Vermont bridges known to have been built by Powers.

== See also ==
- National Register of Historic Places listings in Rutland County, Vermont
- List of Vermont covered bridges
- List of bridges on the National Register of Historic Places in Vermont
