= Pittsford (CDP), Vermont =

Census-designated place in Vermont, United States

Pittsford, Vermont
- Census-designated place
- Location within Vermont Location within the United States
- Coordinates: 43°42′25″N 73°01′39″W
- Country: United States
- State: Vermont
- County: Rutland
- Town: Pittsford

Area
  - Total: 1.99 sq mi (5.15 km^{2})
  - Land: 1.98 sq mi (5.13 km^{2})
  - Water: 0.0077 sq mi (0.02 km^{2})
- Elevation: 535 ft (163 m)

Population (2020)
  - Total: 805
- Time zone: UTC-5 (Eastern (EST))
  - Summer (DST): UTC-4 (EDT)
- ZIP Codes: 05763 (Pittsford); 05744 (Florence)
- Area code: 802
- FIPS code: 50-55525
- GNIS feature ID: 2586647

Pittsford is the central village and a census-designated place (CDP) in the town of Pittsford, Rutland County, Vermont, United States. As of the 2020 census, it had a population of 805, out of 2,862 in the entire town.

== Geography ==
The CDP is in northern Rutland County, slightly east of the center of the town of Pittsford. It sits on high ground overlooking Otter Creek to the west and Furnace Brook, its tributary, to the southeast.

U.S. Route 7 passes through the village, leading north 7 miles (11 km) to Brandon and south 8 miles (13 km) to Rutland. Vermont Route 3 leaves Route 7 at the southern edge of the community and leads south 3 miles (5 km) to Proctor.
