= Proctor (CDP), Vermont =

Census-designated place in Vermont, United States

Proctor, Vermont
- Census-designated place
- Location within Vermont Location within the United States
- Coordinates: 43°40′06″N 73°02′28″W
- Country: United States
- State: Vermont
- County: Rutland
- Town: Proctor

Area
  - Total: 3.75 sq mi (9.70 km^{2})
  - Land: 3.68 sq mi (9.52 km^{2})
  - Water: 0.069 sq mi (0.18 km^{2})
- Elevation: 453 ft (138 m)

Population (2020)
  - Total: 1,565
- Time zone: UTC-5 (Eastern (EST))
  - Summer (DST): UTC-4 (EDT)
- ZIP Code: 05765
- Area code: 802
- FIPS code: 50-57246
- GNIS feature ID: 2807154

Proctor is a census-designated place (CDP) that comprises the northern half of the town of Proctor, Rutland County, Vermont, United States, including the unincorporated village of Proctor. As of the 2020 census, the CDP had a population of 1,565, out of 1,763 in the entire town.

== Geography ==
The CDP is in north-central Rutland County, in the valley of Otter Creek and climbing the steep hillsides on each side. The village is sited where the creek drops over Sutherland Falls, with the Vermont Marble Museum occupying a building of the former Vermont Marble Company overlooking the falls.

Vermont Route 3 passes through the community, leading north 4 miles (6 km) to Pittsford and south the same distance to the village of Center Rutland, 2 miles (3 km) west of downtown Rutland.
