= List of forts in Vermont =

The following is a list of forts in the U.S. state of Vermont.

== List of forts ==
- Battery Redoubt
- Brattleboro Barracks
- Camp Baxter (also known as Baxter Barracks)
- Champlain Arsenal
- Chimney Point
- Cooke's Hill Fort
- Fort Cassin
- Fort Defiance
- Fort Dummer
- Fort Ethan Allen
- Fort Frederick
- Fort Independence, located on Mount Independence
- Fort Loyal
- Fort Mott
- Fort New Haven
- Fort Putney
- Fort Ranger
- Fort Rutland
- Fort Sainte Anne
- Fort Warren
- Josiah Sartwell's Fort
- Orlando Bridgman's Fort

== See also ==
- List of forts in the United States
