= Whitcomb's Rangers =

- Active: 1776–1781
- Allegiance: United States
- Type: Light infantry
- Role: Guerrilla warfare Reconnaissance
- Size: 2 Companies
- Part of: New Hampshire Line
- Garrison/HQ: Fort Ranger
- Nickname(s): Whitcomb's Rangers
- Engagements: American Revolutionary War

Commanders
- Current commander: Major Benjamin Whitcomb
- Notable commanders: Benjamin Whitcomb

Whitcomb's Rangers were authorized on October 15, 1776, and formed in November 1776 at Fort Ticonderoga in New York. The unit consisted of two companies of New Hampshire rangers for service with the Continental Army under the command of Benjamin Whitcomb, a veteran of Bedel's Regiment. They saw action at the Battle of Hubbardton, Battle of Bennington and the Battle of Saratoga. They were disbanded on January 1, 1781 at Coos, New Hampshire.
