= Rutland-2 Vermont Representative District, 2002–2012 =

Rutland-2 Vermont Representative District, 2002–12 was a constituency, or election district, for the Vermont House of Representatives. Such districts are changed every 10 years in response to population changes as determined by the United States Census. The district contained the towns of Castleton, Fair Haven, Hubbardton, and West Haven.

== See also ==
- Rutland-2 Vermont Representative District, 2012–2022
- Rutland-3 Vermont Representative District, 2012–2022
