= Fort Mott =

Fort Mott may refer to:

- Fort Mott (New Jersey)
- Fort Mott (Vermont)

== See also ==
- Fort Motte
