= Cooley Covered Bridge =

- U.S. National Register of Historic Places
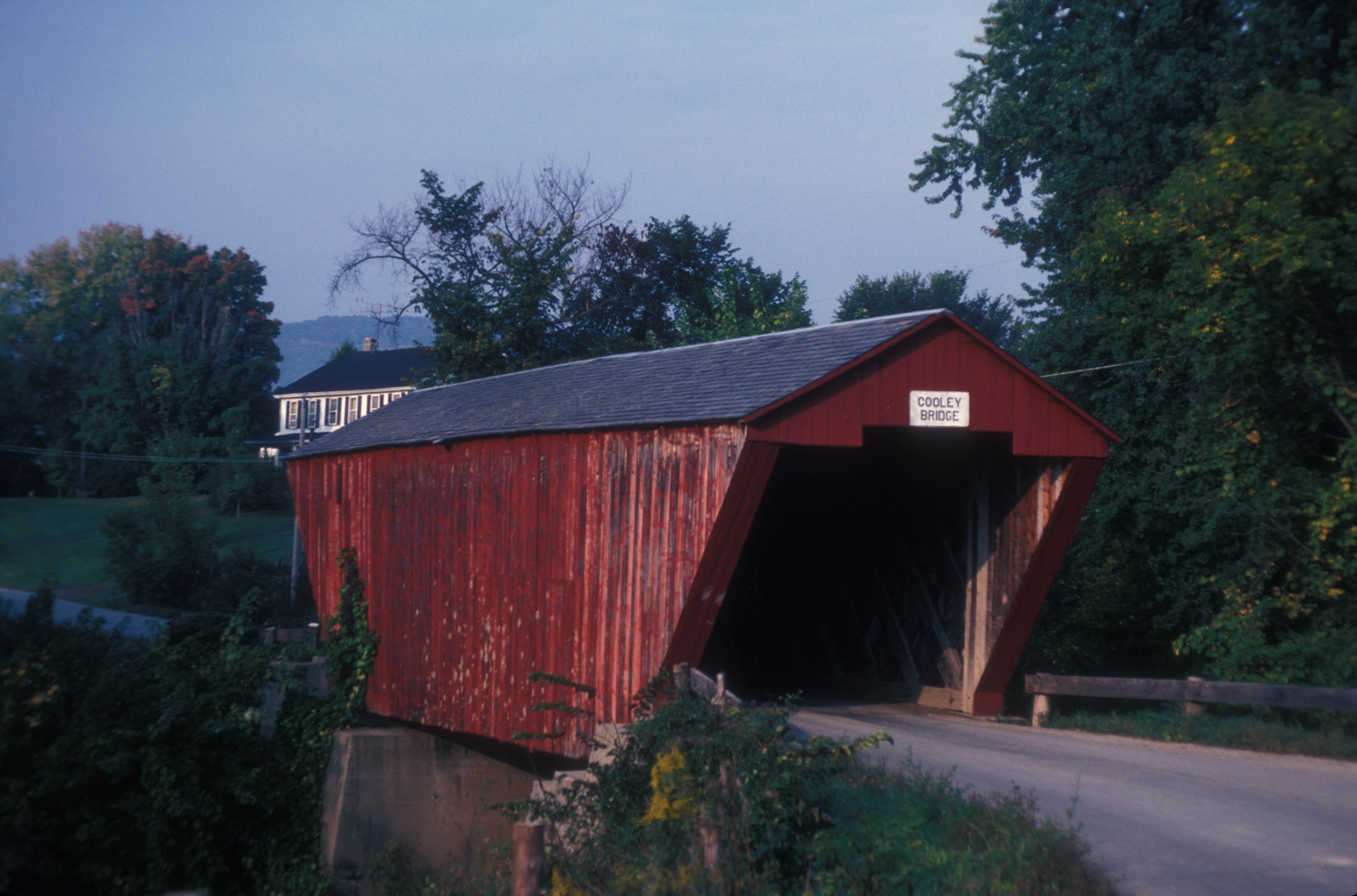
- 1970 photo

- Location within Vermont Location within the United States
- Nearest city: Pittsford, Vermont
- Coordinates: 43°41′24″N 73°1′45″W
- Area: 1 acre (0.40 ha)
- Built: 1849
- Architect: Powers, Nicholas M.
- Architectural style: Town lattice truss
- NRHP reference No.: 74000251
- Added to NRHP: January 24, 1974

The Cooley Covered Bridge is a covered bridge that carries Elm Street across Furnace Brook in Pittsford, Vermont. Built in 1849, it is one of a small number of bridges in the state that has a well-documented association with the 19th-century master bridgewright Nicholas M. Powers, who grew up nearby. It is one of four surviving 19th-century covered bridges in the town, and was listed on the National Register of Historic Places in 1974.

== Description and history ==
The Cooley Covered Bridge is located about 1 mile (1.6 km) south of the village of Pittsford, carrying Elm Street across Furnace Brook, which at that point flows northwest toward Otter Creek. The bridge is a single-span Town lattice truss, with a span of 50.5 feet (15.4 m) and a total structure length of 66 feet (20 m), caused by portals that overhang the ends by 8 feet (2.4 m). The bridge is 18.5 feet (5.6 m) wide, with a roadway width of 15 feet (4.6 m) (one lane). The bridge originally rested on stone abutments, which have either been rebuilt or faced in concrete. It has a slate roof. The sides are sheathed in vertical board siding, which extends around the portal ends and partly to the inside of the structure. Portions of the trusses have been reinforced by doubling the timbers, and some iron bracing has been added to the bridge's underside.

The bridge was built in 1849 by Nicholas M. Powers, who was born a farm not far from here. It is one of four bridges whose construction is known to have been executed or overseen by Powers, acknowledged as the state's best-known builder of covered bridges. It is also one of just four covered bridges in the town.

== See also ==
- National Register of Historic Places listings in Rutland County, Vermont
- List of bridges on the National Register of Historic Places in Vermont
- List of Vermont covered bridges
