= Depot Covered Bridge =

- U.S. National Register of Historic Places
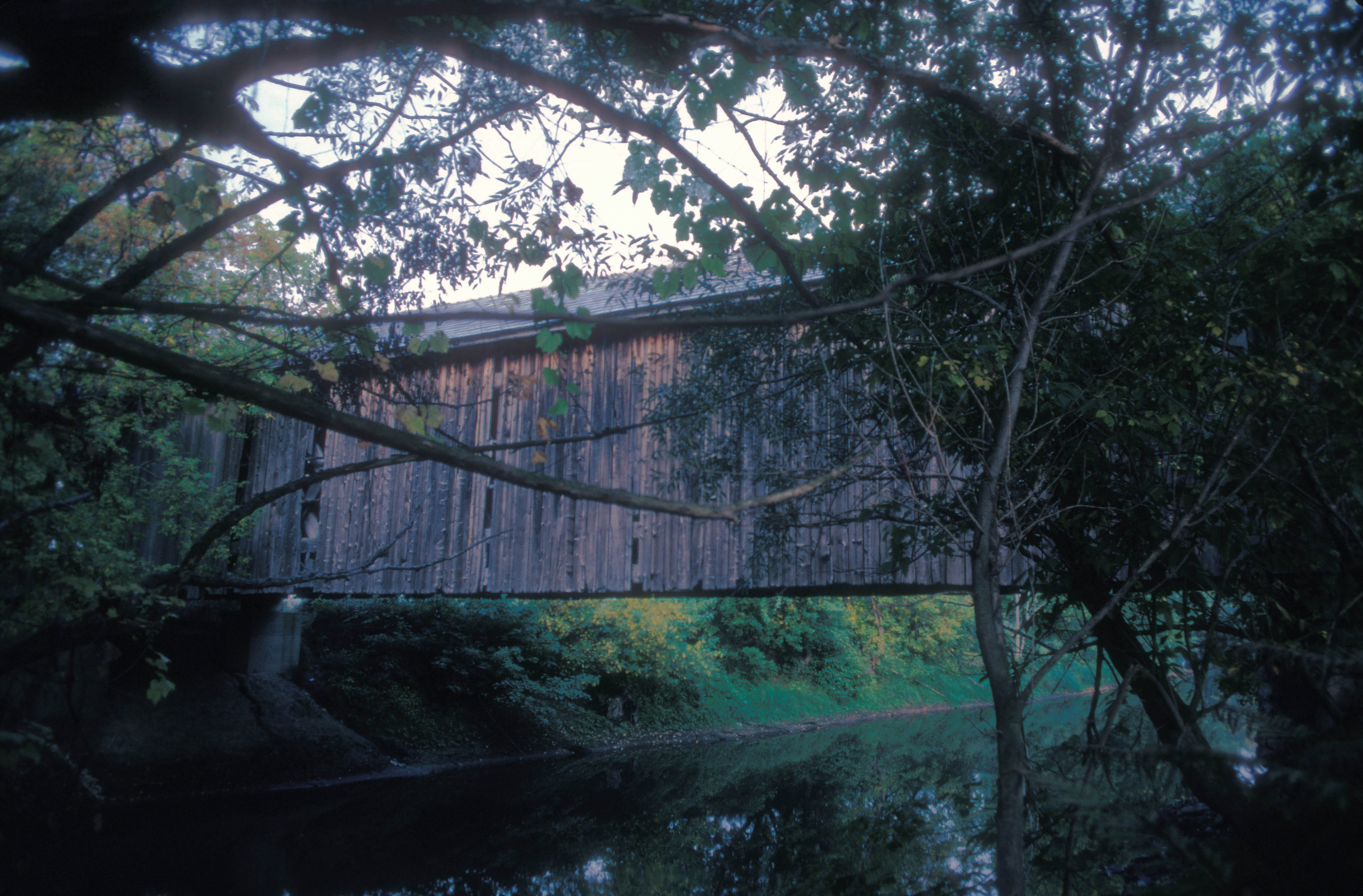
- 1970 photo

- Location within Vermont Location within the United States
- Location: Depot Hill Road at Otter Creek, Pittsford, Vermont
- Coordinates: 43°42′34″N 73°2′36″W
- Area: 1 acre (0.40 ha)
- Built: 1840
- Architectural style: Town lattice truss
- NRHP reference No.: 74000253
- Added to NRHP: January 21, 1974

The Depot Covered Bridge is a historic Town lattice truss bridge, carrying Depot Hill Road over Otter Creek in Pittsford, Vermont. The bridge was built about 1840, and is one of Vermont's older covered bridges. It underwent restoration in the 1980s, and was subsequently reinforced with steel stringers. It was listed on the National Register of Historic Places in 1974.

== Description and history ==
The Depot Covered Bridge is located near the geographic center of Pittsford, west of the main village, on Depot Hill Road, which provides access from the village to the western part of the community. It is single-span Town lattice structure, set on stone abutments that have been faced in concrete. It has a total span of 121 feet (37 m), with the upper ends of the trusses extending 6 feet (1.8 m) beyond the abutments at either end. The bridge is 22 feet (6.7 m) wide, with a roadway width of 18 feet (5.5 m) (one lane). The bridge is sheathed in vertical board siding, and its roof is slate. The bridge deck is now supported by steel stringers.

The bridge was built about 1840, and was one of four surviving 19th-century covered bridges in Pittsford in 1974, when it was listed on the National Register of Historic Places. It underwent restoration in 1974, at which time the abutments were faced in concrete, and in 2006 its deck was supported by steel stringers.

== See also ==
- National Register of Historic Places listings in Rutland County, Vermont
- List of Vermont covered bridges
- List of bridges on the National Register of Historic Places in Vermont
