= Hammond Covered Bridge =

- U.S. National Register of Historic Places
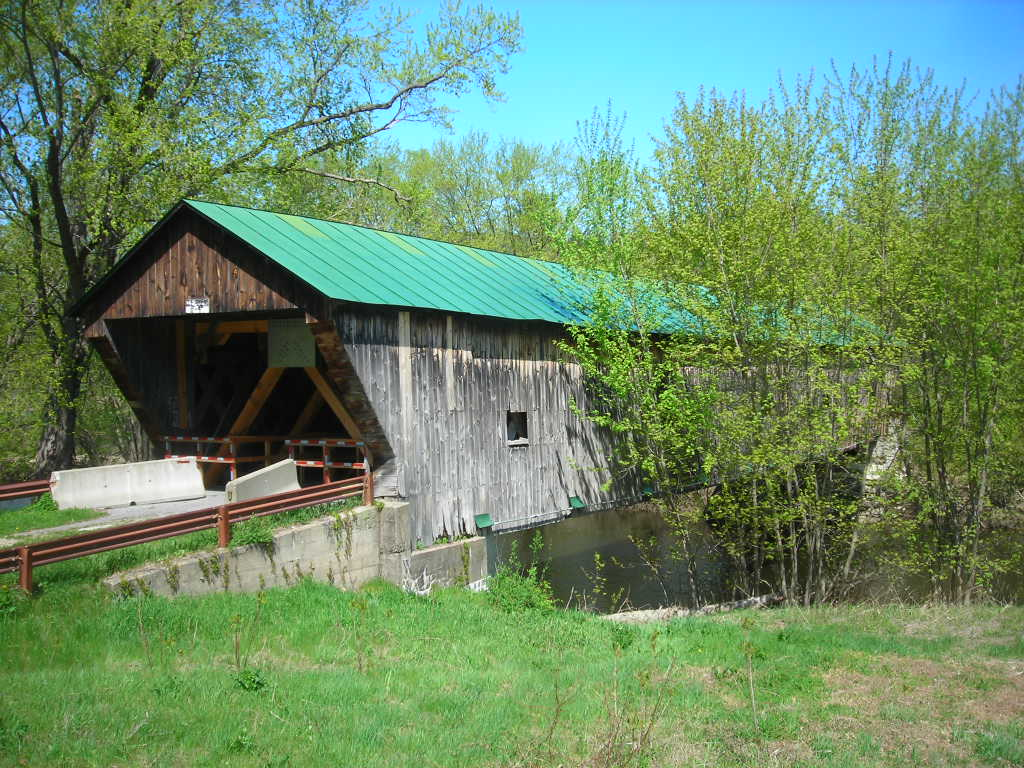

- Location within Vermont Location within the United States
- Nearest city: Pittsford, Vermont
- Coordinates: 43°43′14″N 73°3′14″W
- Area: 1 acre (0.40 ha)
- Built: 1842
- Built by: Asa Nourse
- Architectural style: Town lattice truss
- NRHP reference No.: 74000256
- Added to NRHP: January 21, 1974

The Hammond Covered Bridge is a Town lattice covered bridge spanning Otter Creek in Pittsford, Vermont. The bridge was built in 1842 by Asa Norse, and originally carried Kendall Hill Road, which now passes just to its south. The bridge was added to the National Register of Historic Places on January 21, 1974.

== Description and history ==
The Hammond Covered Bridge is located north of the Pittsford Village center, just north of Kendall Hill Road, a secondary street providing access from United States Route 7 to points on the west side of Otter Creek. The bridge spans the creek in an east-west orientation. It is a single-span Town lattice structure, with trusses 139 feet (42 m) in length, and a roadway width of 18 feet (5.5 m). The eastern abutment is built of stone and marble slabs, and is now topped by a concrete pad, while the western abutment is marble topped by concrete. The bridge has been reinforced with laminated beams mounted below the trusses. The exterior is finished in vertical board siding, which extends around to the portal faces and a short way inside. There are square openings providing light to the interior of the structure, which is capped by a corrugated metal roof.

The bridge was built in 1842 by Asa Nourse. In 1927, a flood swept the bridge 1.5 miles (2.4 km) downstream but left the structure intact. Since it was still functional, the bridge was placed on barrels and transported back to its original location; it is now called "the bridge that went on a voyage". The bridge was later bypassed by a steel and concrete bridge on Kendall Hill Road and is closed to vehicle traffic. It was acquired by the state in 1961, which is responsible for its maintenance.

== See also ==
- National Register of Historic Places listings in Rutland County, Vermont
- List of Vermont covered bridges
- List of bridges on the National Register of Historic Places in Vermont
