= Rutland-2 Vermont Representative District, 2012–2022 =

Rutland-2 Vermont Representative District is a district for the election of members of the Vermont House of Representatives, formed in the redistricting following the 2010 U.S. census. Rutland-2 assumed its current boundaries for the 2012 election, and previously had a different configuration. It contains the towns of Clarendon, Proctor, Wallingford, West Rutland and a portion of the town of Tinmouth.

== Incumbents ==
For the 2012–14 term the incumbents are (according to the 2013 - 2014 Legislative Session Legislative Directory)

- Tom Burditt (Republican)
- Dave Potter (Democrat)
