= Rutland County, Vermont =

County in Vermont, United States

- County
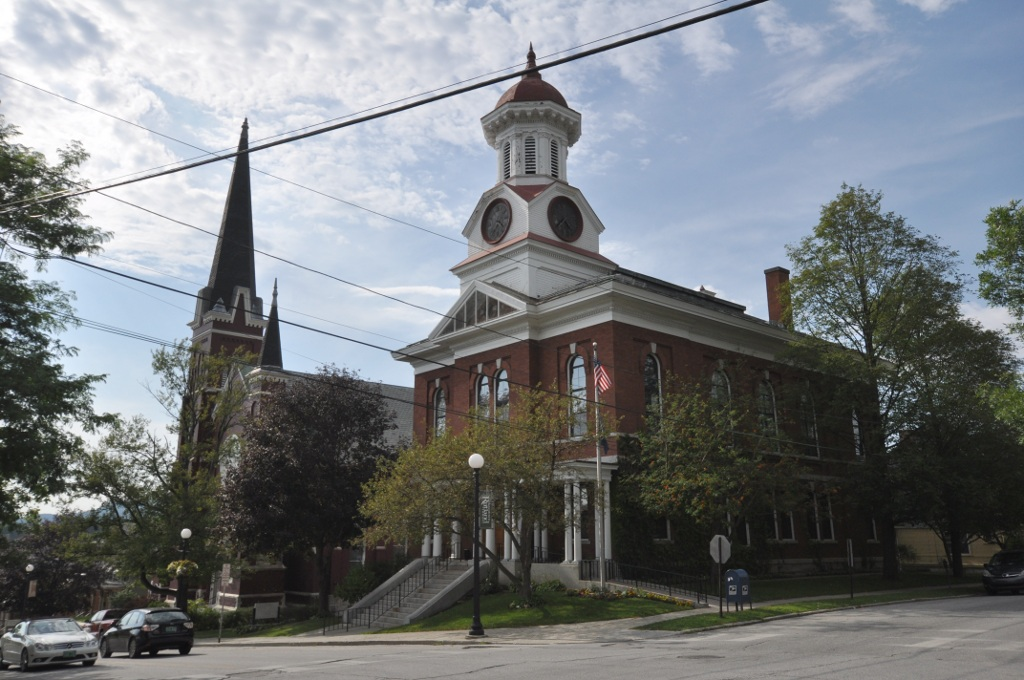
- Rutland Courthouse

- Location within the U.S. state of Vermont
- Coordinates: 43°34′48″N 73°02′12″W
- Country: United States
- State: Vermont
- Founded: 1781
- Named for: Rutland, Massachusetts
- Shire Town: Rutland
- Largest city: Rutland

Area
  - Total: 945 sq mi (2,450 km^{2})
  - Land: 930 sq mi (2,400 km^{2})
  - Water: 15 sq mi (39 km^{2}) 1.6%

Population (2020)
  - Total: 60,572
  - Estimate (2025): 59,653 ▼
  - Density: 65/sq mi (25/km^{2})
- Time zone: UTC−5 (Eastern)
  - Summer (DST): UTC−4 (EDT)
- Congressional district: At-large

Rutland County is a county located in the U.S. state of Vermont. As of the 2020 census, the population was 60,572, making it the second-most populous county in Vermont. Its county seat and most populous municipality is the city of Rutland.

== History ==
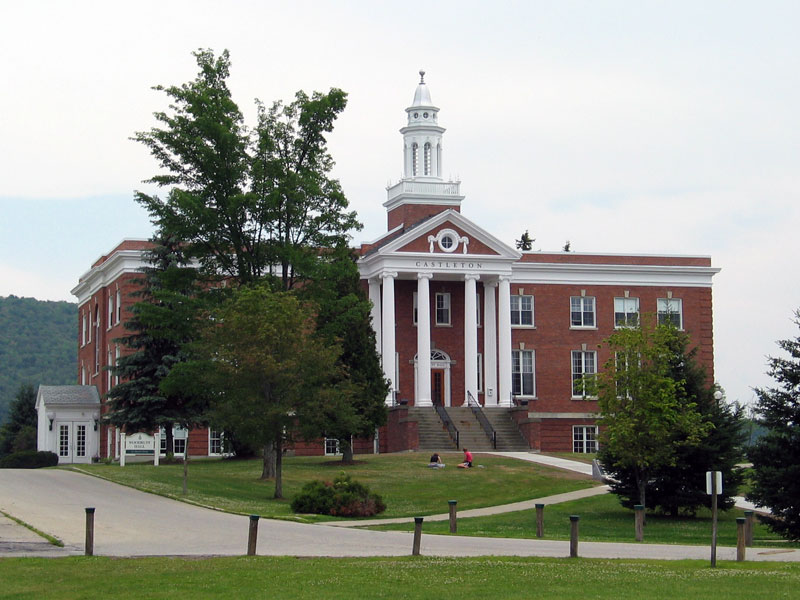
Castleton University is located in Castleton, Vermont, within Rutland County.

During the Revolutionary War there were a number of forts and roads that went through the area now known as Rutland County. In Castleton there was Fort Warren and a possible fort at Hydeville. In Pittsford there was Fort Vengeance and Fort Mott. And in Rutland there was Fort Ranger. The Hubbardton Military Road was a road built in 1775 for the American Revolution that went through the modern day towns of Benson, Hubbardton and Castleton. The Crown Point Road (which was built in 1759 and used until 1783) goes through the modern day towns of Whiting, Sudbury, Hubbardton, Castleton, Ira, Rutland, Clarendon, Shrewsbury, Wallingford and Mount Holly and extended all the way to Fort at Number 4, Charlestown, New Hampshire.

On February 16, 1781, Rutland County was created from Bennington County. From June 26, 1781, until February 23, 1782, Vermont attempted to annex part of New York east of the Hudson River (the so-called West Union); inhabitants in the area favored Vermont's township form of government, while Vermont hoped to gain bargaining power through expansion. New York did not lose control of the area. For almost seven months Rutland County included part of Charlotte County (now Washington County), New York.

In February 1783 Orange County gained the towns of Brookfield and Randolph and Windsor County gained the towns of Bethel and Rochester from Rutland. On October 18, 1785, Addison County was created from Rutland.

On February 27, 1787, Windsor County gained the town of Stockbridge from Rutland, then on October 31, 1792, Rutland gained from Windsor County when the town of Mount Holly was created from Jackson's Gore and the towns of Ludlow and Wallingford. Windsor County gained Benton's Gore from Rutland on March 2, 1797.

On October 25, 1805, Rutland County gained from Bennington County when the town of Mount Tabor gained from the town of Peru. On October 29, 1806, Windsor County gained from Rutland County when the town of Rochester gained a small area from the town of Pittsfield. On November 15, 1813, the county gained from Windsor County when the town of Pittsfield gained a small area from the town of Stockbridge, a change too small to appear on maps. On November 9, 1814 Addison County gained from Rutland County when the town of Goshen gained from the town of Philadelphia. On October 22, 1822, the county gained from Windsor County when the town of Pittsfield gained a small area from the town of Stockbridge. On November 3, 1823, it gained from Windsor County again when the town of Shrewsbury gained a small area from the town of Plymouth. On November 15, 1824, Windsor County gained from Rutland County when the town of Rochester gained a small area from the town of Pittsfield. On November 17, 1825, Bennington County gained from the county when the town of Dorset gained a small area from the town of Mount Tabor.

On November 7, 1839, the Legislature authorized Addison County to gain a small area from Rutland County when the town of Whiting was to gain from the town of Orwell. However, there is no evidence that a change took effect. Addison County gained the town of Orwell from Rutland County on December 1, 1847. On March 6, 1855, Addison County gained another small area from the county when the town of Goshen gained "Clemens Land" from the town of Brandon.

On November 10, 1870, the Legislature authorized Rutland County to gain a small area from Windsor County when the town of Mount Holly was to gain from the town of Weston. But there is no evidence that the change took effect. On April 7, 1880, the county lost to Washington County, New York, when New York gained a small area west of the village of Fair Haven from Vermont due to a change in the course of the Poultney River, a change too small to see on most maps. On November 21, 1884, Windsor County gained a small area from Rutland County when the town of Stockbridge gained Parker's Gore. On October 8, 1895, Windsor County gained from the county when the town of Weston gained from the town of Mount Tabor.

The county experienced the first outbreak of polio in the United States in 1894. Within weeks, 132 persons, mostly children, were paralyzed. An additional 18 had died.

== Geography ==
According to the United States Census Bureau, the county has a total area of 945 square miles (2,450 km^{2}), of which 930 square miles (2,400 km^{2}) is land and 15 square miles (39 km^{2}) (1.6%) is water. It is the second-largest county in Vermont by area. The primary stream of the county is Otter Creek, which runs through the county from the south to the north.

=== Adjacent counties ===
- Addison County - north
- Windsor County - east
- Bennington County - south
- Washington County, New York - west

=== National protected areas ===
- Green Mountain National Forest (part)
- White Rocks National Recreation Area (part)

== Demographics ==
Historical population
| Census | Pop. | Note | %± |
|---|---|---|---|
| 1790 | 15,590 | | — |
| 1800 | 23,813 | | 52.7% |
| 1810 | 29,486 | | 23.8% |
| 1820 | 29,983 | | 1.7% |
| 1830 | 31,294 | | 4.4% |
| 1840 | 30,699 | | −1.9% |
| 1850 | 33,059 | | 7.7% |
| 1860 | 35,946 | | 8.7% |
| 1870 | 40,651 | | 13.1% |
| 1880 | 41,829 | | 2.9% |
| 1890 | 45,397 | | 8.5% |
| 1900 | 44,209 | | −2.6% |
| 1910 | 48,139 | | 8.9% |
| 1920 | 46,213 | | −4.0% |
| 1930 | 48,453 | | 4.8% |
| 1940 | 45,638 | | −5.8% |
| 1950 | 45,905 | | 0.6% |
| 1960 | 46,719 | | 1.8% |
| 1970 | 52,637 | | 12.7% |
| 1980 | 58,347 | | 10.8% |
| 1990 | 62,142 | | 6.5% |
| 2000 | 63,400 | | 2.0% |
| 2010 | 61,642 | | −2.8% |
| 2020 | 60,572 | | −1.7% |
| 2025 (est.) | 59,653 | ▼ | −1.5% |
U.S. Decennial Census; 1790–1960 1900–1990; 1990–2000 2010–2020

=== 2020 census ===
As of the 2020 census, the county had a population of 60,572. Of the residents, 17.4% were under the age of 18 and 23.6% were 65 years of age or older; the median age was 48.2 years. For every 100 females there were 97.7 males, and for every 100 females age 18 and over there were 95.6 males.

The racial makeup of the county was 91.5% White, 0.9% Black or African American, 0.3% American Indian and Alaska Native, 0.8% Asian, 0.6% from some other race, and 6.0% from two or more races. Hispanic or Latino residents of any race comprised 2.0% of the population.

There were 26,651 households in the county, of which 21.9% had children under the age of 18 living with them and 26.7% had a female householder with no spouse or partner present. About 32.9% of all households were made up of individuals and 15.2% had someone living alone who was 65 years of age or older.

There were 33,869 housing units, of which 21.3% were vacant. Among occupied housing units, 70.1% were owner-occupied and 29.9% were renter-occupied. The homeowner vacancy rate was 1.6% and the rental vacancy rate was 7.7%.

Rutland County, Vermont – Racial and ethnic composition Note: the US Census treats Hispanic/Latino as an ethnic category. This table excludes Latinos from the racial categories and assigns them to a separate category. Hispanics/Latinos may be of any race.
| Race / Ethnicity (NH = Non-Hispanic) | Pop 2000 | Pop 2010 | Pop 2020 | % 2000 | % 2010 | % 2020 |
|---|---|---|---|---|---|---|
| White alone (NH) | 61,913 | 59,369 | 55,092 | 97.65% | 96.31% | 90.95% |
| Black or African American alone (NH) | 194 | 315 | 493 | 0.30% | 0.51% | 0.81% |
| Native American or Alaska Native alone (NH) | 133 | 135 | 146 | 0.20% | 0.21% | 0.24% |
| Asian alone (NH) | 241 | 370 | 458 | 0.38% | 0.60% | 0.75% |
| Pacific Islander alone (NH) | 15 | 9 | 14 | 0.02% | 0.01% | 0.02% |
| Other race alone (NH) | 25 | 29 | 171 | 0.03% | 0.04% | 0.28% |
| Mixed race or Multiracial (NH) | 437 | 734 | 2,973 | 0.68% | 1.19% | 4.90% |
| Hispanic or Latino (any race) | 442 | 705 | 1,225 | 0.69% | 1.14% | 2.02% |
| Total | 63,400 | 61,642 | 60,572 | 100.00% | 100.00% | 100.00% |

=== 2010 census ===
As of the census of 2010, there were 61,642 people, 25,984 households, and 16,018 families residing in the county. The population density was 66.3 inhabitants per square mile (25.6/km^{2}). There were 33,768 housing units at an average density of 36.3 per square mile (14.0/km^{2}). The racial makeup of the county was 97.1% white, 0.6% Asian, 0.5% black or African American, 0.2% American Indian, 0.2% from other races, and 1.3% from two or more races. Those of Hispanic or Latino origin made up 1.1% of the population.

Of the 25,984 households, 25.9% had children under the age of 18 living with them, 47.3% were married couples living together, 9.9% had a female householder with no husband present, 38.4% were non-families, and 30.2% of all households were made up of individuals. The average household size was 2.28 and the average family size was 2.81. The median age was 44.3 years.

The median income for a household in the county was $47,027 and the median income for a family was $58,790. Males had a median income of $40,638 versus $34,580 for females. The per capita income for the county was $25,426. About 8.1% of families and 11.8% of the population were below the poverty line, including 15.2% of those under age 18 and 8.5% of those age 65 or over.

== Politics ==
In 1828, Rutland County was won by National Republican Party candidate John Quincy Adams and by Henry Clay in 1832.

From William Henry Harrison in 1836 to Winfield Scott in 1852, the county would be won by Whig Party candidates.

From John C. Frémont in 1856 to Richard Nixon in 1960, the Republican Party would have a 104-year winning streak in the county.

In 1964, Rutland County was won by Democratic Party incumbent President Lyndon B. Johnson, who became the first Democratic presidential candidate to not only win the county, but to win the state of Vermont entirely.

Following the Democrats' victory in 1964, the county went back to voting for Republican candidates for another 20 year winning streak starting with Richard Nixon in 1968 and ending with George H. W. Bush in 1988, who became the last Republican presidential candidate to win the county.

In 1992, the county was won by Bill Clinton, and has been won by Democratic candidates ever since. That said, Rutland County has continued to be relatively close in some presidential elections. In 2000, Al Gore carried Rutland County by just 1.6%; in 2004, Kerry carried it by 4.7%; and in 2016, Hillary Clinton carried it by 3.9% (with a substantial 'other' vote in the 2000 and 2016 elections).

Republicans see greater success at a local level in Rutland County. A majority of the county's legislative seats in both the Vermont House of Representatives and Vermont Senate are held by Republicans. In nine of the ten past gubernatorial elections, the Republican candidate has won the greatest number of votes in Rutland County. Most recently, incumbent Republican governor Phil Scott won 80 percent of Rutland County's votes in the 2024 Vermont gubernatorial election.

United States presidential election results for Rutland County, Vermont
| Year | Republican | | Democratic | | Third party(ies) | |
| Year | No. | % | No. | % | No. | % |
|---|---|---|---|---|---|---|
| 1880 | 5,690 | 69.79% | 2,421 | 29.69% | 42 | 0.52% |
| 1884 | 5,096 | 66.68% | 2,253 | 29.48% | 294 | 3.85% |
| 1888 | 6,088 | 68.57% | 2,417 | 27.22% | 373 | 4.20% |
| 1892 | 5,210 | 66.50% | 2,426 | 30.96% | 199 | 2.54% |
| 1896 | 6,794 | 78.00% | 1,661 | 19.07% | 255 | 2.93% |
| 1900 | 5,901 | 74.66% | 1,874 | 23.71% | 129 | 1.63% |
| 1904 | 5,772 | 77.12% | 1,367 | 18.27% | 345 | 4.61% |
| 1908 | 5,643 | 75.70% | 1,542 | 20.69% | 269 | 3.61% |
| 1912 | 2,999 | 36.03% | 2,079 | 24.98% | 3,246 | 39.00% |
| 1916 | 5,926 | 66.35% | 2,785 | 31.18% | 221 | 2.47% |
| 1920 | 8,940 | 73.10% | 3,192 | 26.10% | 97 | 0.79% |
| 1924 | 10,642 | 74.32% | 2,477 | 17.30% | 1,201 | 8.39% |
| 1928 | 12,621 | 59.36% | 8,609 | 40.49% | 32 | 0.15% |
| 1932 | 10,821 | 54.24% | 8,924 | 44.73% | 206 | 1.03% |
| 1936 | 10,794 | 52.94% | 9,543 | 46.80% | 54 | 0.26% |
| 1940 | 10,829 | 55.02% | 8,798 | 44.70% | 54 | 0.27% |
| 1944 | 9,544 | 57.30% | 7,111 | 42.70% | 0 | 0.00% |
| 1948 | 10,206 | 60.56% | 6,452 | 38.28% | 195 | 1.16% |
| 1952 | 13,980 | 69.95% | 5,970 | 29.87% | 36 | 0.18% |
| 1956 | 14,570 | 73.83% | 5,165 | 26.17% | 0 | 0.00% |
| 1960 | 12,166 | 56.82% | 9,246 | 43.18% | 0 | 0.00% |
| 1964 | 7,165 | 35.11% | 13,241 | 64.89% | 0 | 0.00% |
| 1968 | 10,318 | 51.26% | 9,000 | 44.72% | 809 | 4.02% |
| 1972 | 14,143 | 62.68% | 8,261 | 36.61% | 159 | 0.70% |
| 1976 | 11,565 | 53.00% | 9,868 | 45.23% | 386 | 1.77% |
| 1980 | 11,142 | 45.98% | 9,596 | 39.60% | 3,496 | 14.43% |
| 1984 | 15,236 | 60.98% | 9,545 | 38.20% | 204 | 0.82% |
| 1988 | 14,482 | 55.15% | 11,496 | 43.78% | 283 | 1.08% |
| 1992 | 10,963 | 35.20% | 12,829 | 41.19% | 7,352 | 23.61% |
| 1996 | 9,934 | 36.48% | 13,230 | 48.59% | 4,065 | 14.93% |
| 2000 | 13,546 | 46.13% | 13,990 | 47.65% | 1,826 | 6.22% |
| 2004 | 14,440 | 46.62% | 15,904 | 51.34% | 631 | 2.04% |
| 2008 | 11,584 | 36.64% | 19,355 | 61.22% | 678 | 2.14% |
| 2012 | 10,835 | 37.87% | 17,088 | 59.73% | 686 | 2.40% |
| 2016 | 12,479 | 42.14% | 13,635 | 46.04% | 3,501 | 11.82% |
| 2020 | 14,672 | 43.19% | 18,230 | 53.66% | 1,068 | 3.14% |
| 2024 | 15,586 | 45.70% | 17,375 | 50.95% | 1,141 | 3.35% |

== Transportation ==
=== Air ===
The Rutland–Southern Vermont Regional Airport is located just south of Rutland city in North Clarendon. It is a commercial airport providing three flights daily to Boston.

=== Rail ===
Passenger rail service is provided by Amtrak via the Ethan Allen Express which connects Rutland with Burlington and New York City. There are two train stations in Rutland County served by this route: Castleton station and Rutland station.

=== Bus ===
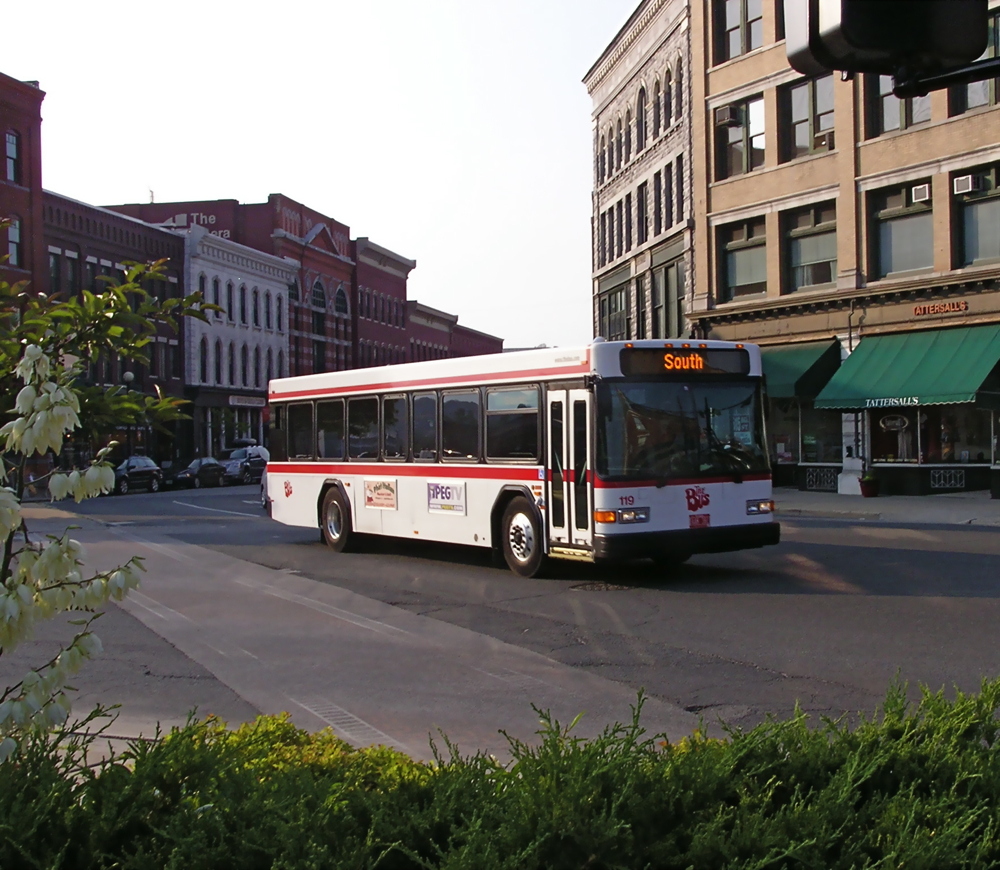
"The Bus" in Rutland city

The Marble Valley Regional Transit District provides "The Bus" with service to the city of Rutland and the towns of Rutland, West Rutland, Castleton, Fair Haven, Poultney, Proctor, and Killington, as well as commuter service to Ludlow, Middlebury and Manchester.

Premier Coach's Vermont Translines serves Rutland daily with two intercity bus connections between Burlington, Lebanon, New Hampshire and Albany, New York in a partnership with Greyhound. They also serve Wallingford, Brandon, Mendon and Killington along the two routes.

=== Highway ===
- U.S. Route 4 enters Rutland County in Fair Haven from the west. It continues east as a four-lane expressway for 19 miles to Rutland city with 6 exits serving Fair Haven, Castleton, and Rutland. It then continues east from Rutland through Killington into Windsor County.
- U.S. Route 7 enters Rutland County from the south in the town of Mount Tabor and continues north through Wallingford and Clarendon to Rutland city. For 10 miles south of Rutland, Route 7 is a divided highway. It then continues north through Pittsford and Brandon before entering Addison County.
- Vermont Route 3 is a 7.8 north–south highway that extends north from Rutland Center through Proctor and into Pittsford terminating at US Route 7.
- Vermont Route 4A is the old alignment of US Route 4 and parallels that highway from Fair Haven through Castleton before terminating in West Rutland.
- Vermont Route 22A is a north–south highway entering the county in Fair Haven from the New York state line and passing through West Haven and Benson before continuing into Addison County.
- Vermont Route 30 is a north–south highway entering the county in Pawlet from Bennington County and continuing north through Poultney, Castleton, Hubbardton, and Sudbury before continuing into Addison County.
- Vermont Route 31 is a 5.5 mile highway from the New York state line in Wells to the village of Poultney.
- Vermont Route 53 is a short north–south highway that extends north from Route 73 in the Brandon village of Forestdale toward Lake Dunmore in Addison County.
- Vermont Route 73 is an east–west highway extending from the county line with Addison County through Sudbury and Brandon and then returning to Addison County.
- Vermont Route 100 is a north–south highway entering from Windsor County to the south through Killington and then returning to Windsor County.
- Vermont Route 103 is a north–south highway entering from Windsor County to the south in Mount Holly and extending north through Wallingford and Clarendon before terminating at Route 7.
- Vermont Route 133 is a 22-mile north–south highway completely within Rutland County. It extends north from Pawlet through Middletown Springs and Tinmouth before terminating at Vermont 4A in West Rutland.
- Vermont Route 140 is an east–west highway crossing the county east from Poultney through Middletown Springs, Tinmouth, and Wallingford before terminating at Route 103 in Mount Holly.
- Vermont Route 144 is a 6.8 mile east–west highway extending from Route 22A in Benson through Hubbardton past Lake Hortonia before terminating at Route 30 in Sudbury.
- Vermont Route 149 is an east–west highway extending from the New York state line for only 1.3 miles to Vermont 30 in Pawlet.
- Vermont Route 155 is a north–south highway continuing north from Windsor County in the town of Mount Holly and then terminating in Wallingford at Route 103.

== Communities ==
=== City ===
- Rutland (shire town)

=== Towns ===
- Benson
- Brandon
- Castleton
- Chittenden
- Clarendon
- Danby
- Fair Haven
- Hubbardton
- Ira
- Killington (formerly known as Sherburne)
- Mendon
- Middletown Springs
- Mount Holly
- Mount Tabor
- Pawlet
- Pittsfield
- Pittsford
- Poultney
- Proctor
- Rutland town
- Shrewsbury
- Sudbury
- Tinmouth
- Wallingford
- Wells
- West Haven
- West Rutland

=== Incorporated village ===
- Poultney

=== Census-designated places ===
- Benson
- Brandon
- Castleton
- Castleton Four Corners
- Chittenden
- Danby
- East Poultney
- Fair Haven
- Killington Village
- Middletown Springs
- North Clarendon
- Pawlet
- Pittsford
- Proctor
- Wallingford
- Wells
- West Pawlet
- West Rutland

=== Other communities ===
- Belmont, in the town of Mount Holly
- Florence, in the town of Pittsford
- Hortonia, in the town of Hubbardton
- Hortonville, in the town of Mount Holly

== Education ==
School districts in the county include:

K-12:

- Addison Rutland Supervisory District
- Greater Rutland County Supervisory Union
- Mill River Unified School District
- Rutland City School District
- Rutland Northeast Supervisory Union
- Two Rivers Supervisory Union
- Windsor Central Supervisory Union

Elementary:

- Bennington Rutland Supervisory Union

== See also ==
- List of counties in Vermont
- National Register of Historic Places listings in Rutland County, Vermont
