= Fort Warren =

Fort Warren may refer to:

- Fort Warren (Massachusetts)
- Fort Warren (Texas)
- Fort Warren (Vermont)
- Fort D.A. Russell (Wyoming), formerly known as Fort Francis E. Warren, subsequently as Francis E. Warren Air Force Base
- Francis E. Warren Air Force Base
