= Pittsford Green Historic District =

Historic district in Vermont, United States

- U.S. National Register of Historic Places
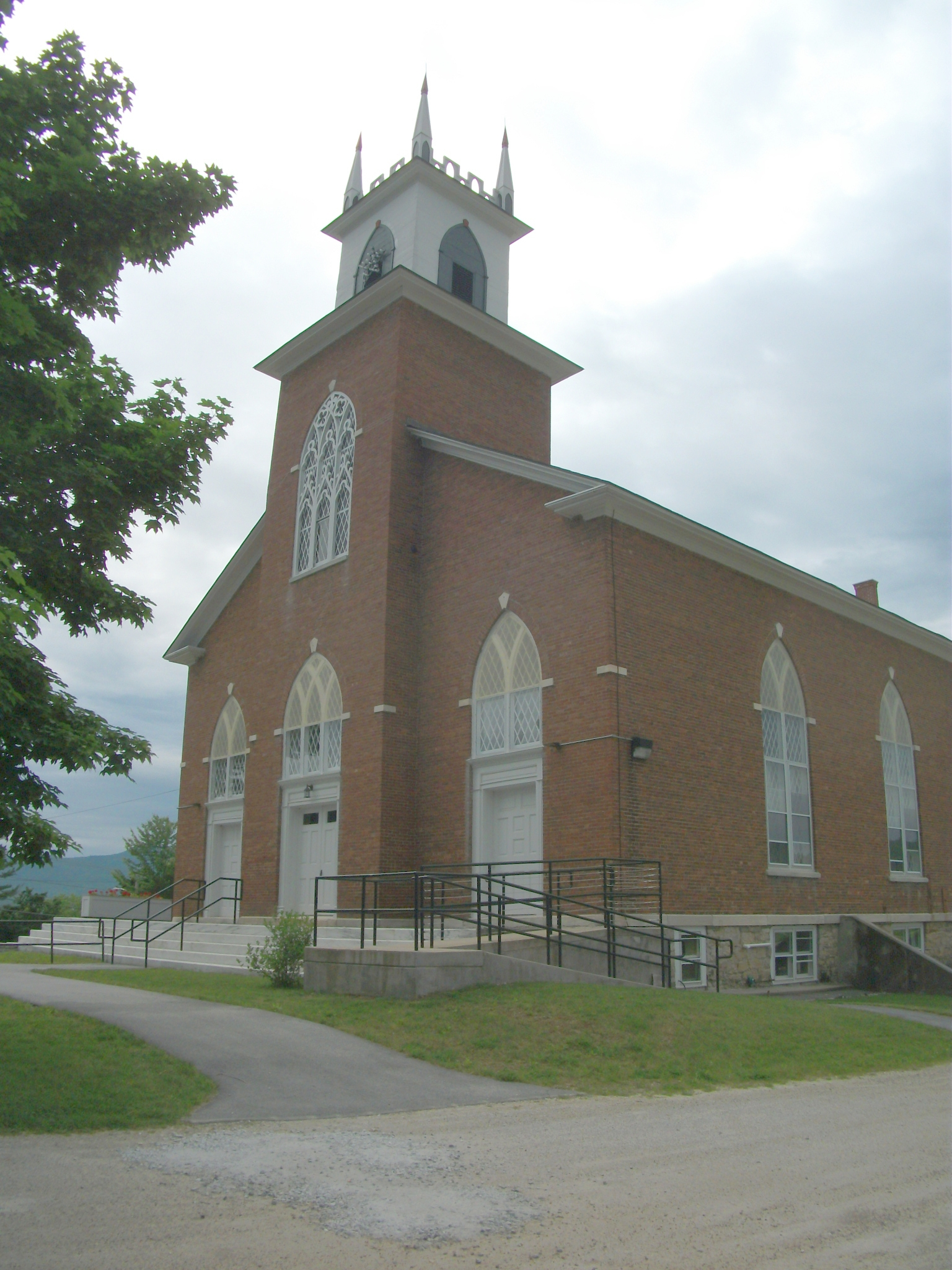

- Location within Vermont Location within the United States
- Location: Main St., Pittsford, Vermont
- Coordinates: 43°42′26″N 73°1′44″W
- Area: 15 acres (6.1 ha)
- Architectural style: Mid 19th Century Revival, Federal, Late Victorian
- NRHP reference No.: 82001704
- Added to NRHP: May 13, 1982

The Pittsford Green Historic District encompasses the heart of the traditional village center of Pittsford, Vermont. Centered on a stretch of United States Route 7, the village's development began in the late 18th century, and now consists almost entirely of buildings from the 19th century. The district was listed on the National Register of Historic Places in 1982.

== Description and history ==
The area that is now the town of Pittsford was first permanently settled by colonists in 1769, and the area that is now its village center began to take shape around 1795, with the opening of a tavern, the founding by Israel Keith of an iron foundry nearby, and the establishment of a marble quarry by Jeremiah Sheldon across Otter Creek to the west. The village became a stagecoach stop on the main road between Rutland and Vergennes, now United States Route 7. The village green, located on the east side of US 7, took a more definite shape with the construction of the Congregational Church in 1837. By the turn of the 20th century, most of the area's industries were in decline, the marble quarries being the notable exception.

The historic district extends from the northern end of the village green southward along Main Street (US 7), to a four-way junction with Elm and Arch Streets where US 7 turns sharply to the east. The village green is roughly triangular in shape, and is lined on the east side by houses, with the Congregational Church set prominently on a rise at its north end. Most of the buildings in the district are wood frame residences. There are only five brick buildings: one is the church, another is the Romanesque Maclure (Walker Memorial) Library (1894–95). Five of the surviving houses date to the 1790s, representing the earliest surviving period of development.

== See also ==
- National Register of Historic Places listings in Rutland County, Vermont
