= Thomas H. Palmer House =

Historic house in Vermont, United States

- U.S. National Register of Historic Places
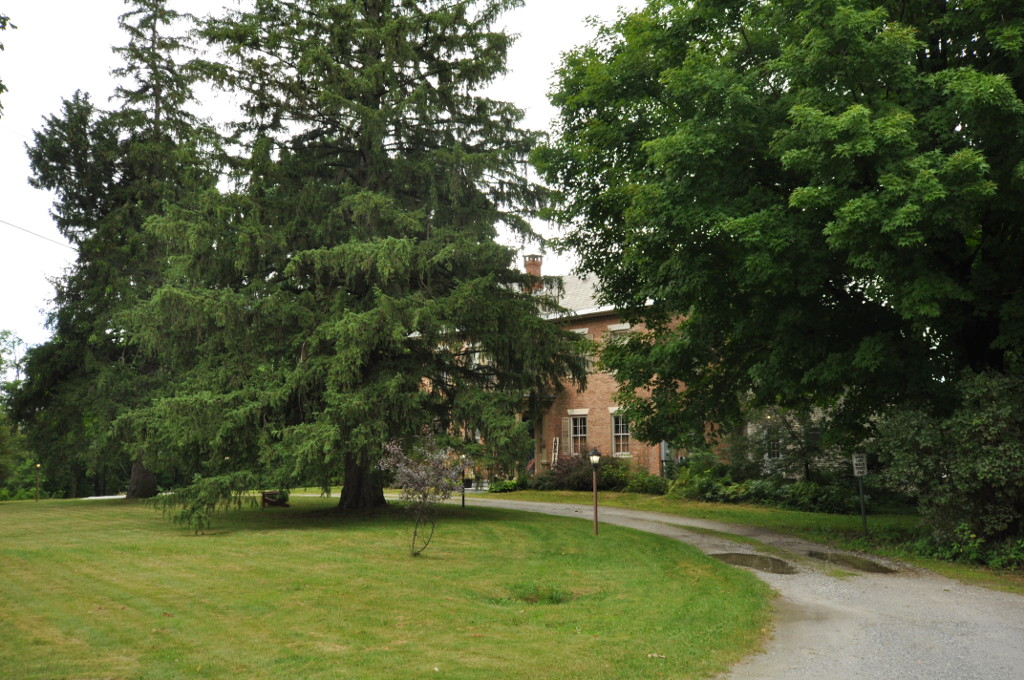

- Location within Vermont Location within the United States
- Location: 2636 US 7, Pittsford, Vermont
- Coordinates: 43°42′1″N 73°0′28″W
- Area: 1 acre (0.40 ha)
- Built: 1832
- Architectural style: Greek Revival, Federal
- NRHP reference No.: 78000243
- Added to NRHP: December 29, 1978

The Thomas H. Palmer House is a historic house at 2636 United States Route 7 in Pittsford, Vermont, United States. Built in 1832, it is a relatively upscale brick house, with Federal and Greek Revival styling. It is notable as the home of Thomas Palmer, an influential figure in the development of Pittsford and state-level educational standards in the mid-19th century. The house was listed on the National Register of Historic Places in 1978.

== Description and history ==
The Palmer House is located south of Pittsford's village center, a short way southeast of the junction of US 7 and Vermont Route 3, on the northeast side of the road. It is a 2 1/2-story brick building, set at the back of a semicircular drive. It has a gable roof and is set on a marble foundation. The main facade is five bays wide, with a central projecting two-story gable-roofed section. This section consists of a two-bay window on the second floor, and a porch sheltering the main entrance on the first. The porch is supported by square posts mounted on paneled blocks, and has a dentillated cornice. The interior of the house follows a typical center hall plan, with its only significantly preserved interior in the double-size parlor on the left, which retains original high-style Greek Revival woodwork.

The house was built in 1832 for Thomas Haig Palmer, a Scottish immigrant and educator who moved to the area from Philadelphia, and his wife, Joanna Fenton from Georgia, Vermont. With brothers George Palmer and James Watt Palmer he had printed some of the first foreign language publications in the country, including promotional material for Simon Bolivar of Venezuela, as a young professor in Bogota informed a descendant recently.

The relatively high style sophistication of the interior is attributed to Palmer's time in a sophisticated urban environment, and is relatively unusual for the rural setting. Palmer was an important force in improving the school system in Pittsford, where he began serving as school superintendent in 1828. His improvements drew statewide notice, and he was a leading force in drafting updates to the state's education standards in the 1840s. He had a young family, and was motivated to see his children get a proper secondary education as he had received in Scotland. His house has since 2007 served as a bed and breakfast inn.

In 2020 the property was sold and has been returned to farm use under the name of Sunshine Village Lavender Farm. The farm boasts over 1000 beautiful, fragrant lavender plants that are harvested each summer, there is a pond and a stream running along the side of the 17 acres. Sunshine Village Lavender Farm is a wedding event venue that can be rented May through November for outdoor events of up to 250 guests.

== See also ==
- National Register of Historic Places listings in Rutland County, Vermont
