= Colburn Bridge =

- U.S. National Register of Historic Places
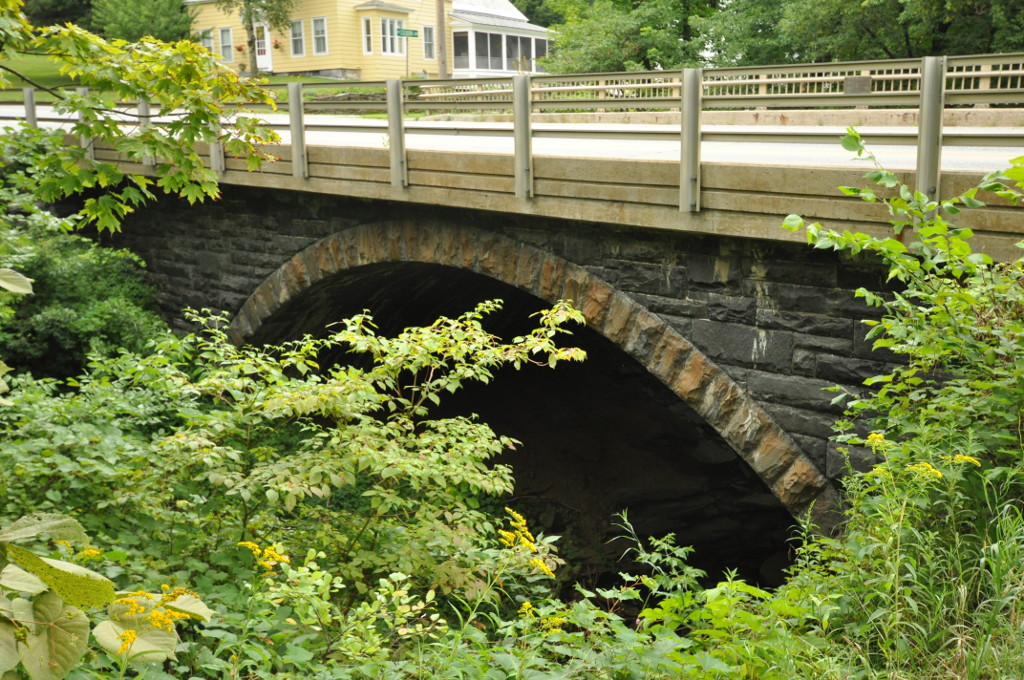

- Location within Vermont Location within the United States
- Location: US 7 over Sugar Hollow Brook, Pittsford, Vermont
- Coordinates: 43°42′25″N 73°1′17″W
- Area: less than one acre
- Built: 1899
- Built by: J.D. Sherrill, J.E. Flood
- Engineer: Thomas F. Chappell; E.L. Grimes
- Architectural style: Masonry arch bridge
- MPS: Metal Truss, Masonry, and Concrete Bridges in Vermont MPS
- NRHP reference No.: 90001493
- Added to NRHP: October 11, 1990

The Colburn Bridge is a historic bridge in Pittsford, Vermont. It is a masonry arch bridge, carrying U.S. Route 7 (US 7) across Sugar Hollow Brook a short way east of the town center. Built in 1899, it is one of a modest number of surviving masonry arch bridges in the state, and exhibits particularly high quality period workmanship. It was listed on the National Register of Historic Places in 1990.

== Description and history ==
The Colburn Bridge is located about 0.5 miles (0.80 km) east of the town center of Pittsford, on US 7, the major north–south route in western Vermont. It is located near the former home of Charles Colburn, a blacksmith who moved to the area in 1832. Although US 7 is mainly a north–south route, at this point it runs east–west, crossing a gorge cut by the south-flowing Sugar Hollow Brook. The bridge is a single-span masonry structure, 46 feet (14 m) long and 39 feet (12 m) wide. The arch is semicircular, with a radius of 20 to 25 feet (6.1 to 7.6 m). The abutments are formed out of rough-cut limestone blocks, while the voussoirs of the arch face are slightly better dressed. The spandrels are faced randomly coursed rough-cut limestone. The bridge originally had limestone railings capped by dressed stone, but these have been removed. In their place are modern metal guardrails, partly set on concrete slabs that cantilever out slightly from the masonry structure.

A bridge has been documented to exist on or near this site since the early 18th century. The present bridge was built in 1899, and was a gift of Anne Wagner Boardman, wife of Pittsford native Charles Nye Boardman. At the time of its listing on the National Register of Historic Places in 1990, it was one of seventeen documented masonry arch bridges in the state. Many older bridges were washed away in the state's devastating 1927 floods, and the state has not generally funded construction of stone arch bridges since 1915.

== See also ==
- National Register of Historic Places listings in Rutland County, Vermont
- List of bridges on the National Register of Historic Places in Vermont
