= Robert Helm =

American politician (born 1949)

Robert G. Helm (born 1949) is a Republican politician who served in the Vermont House of Representatives. He represented the Rutland-3 Representative District.
