= Wilson Castle =

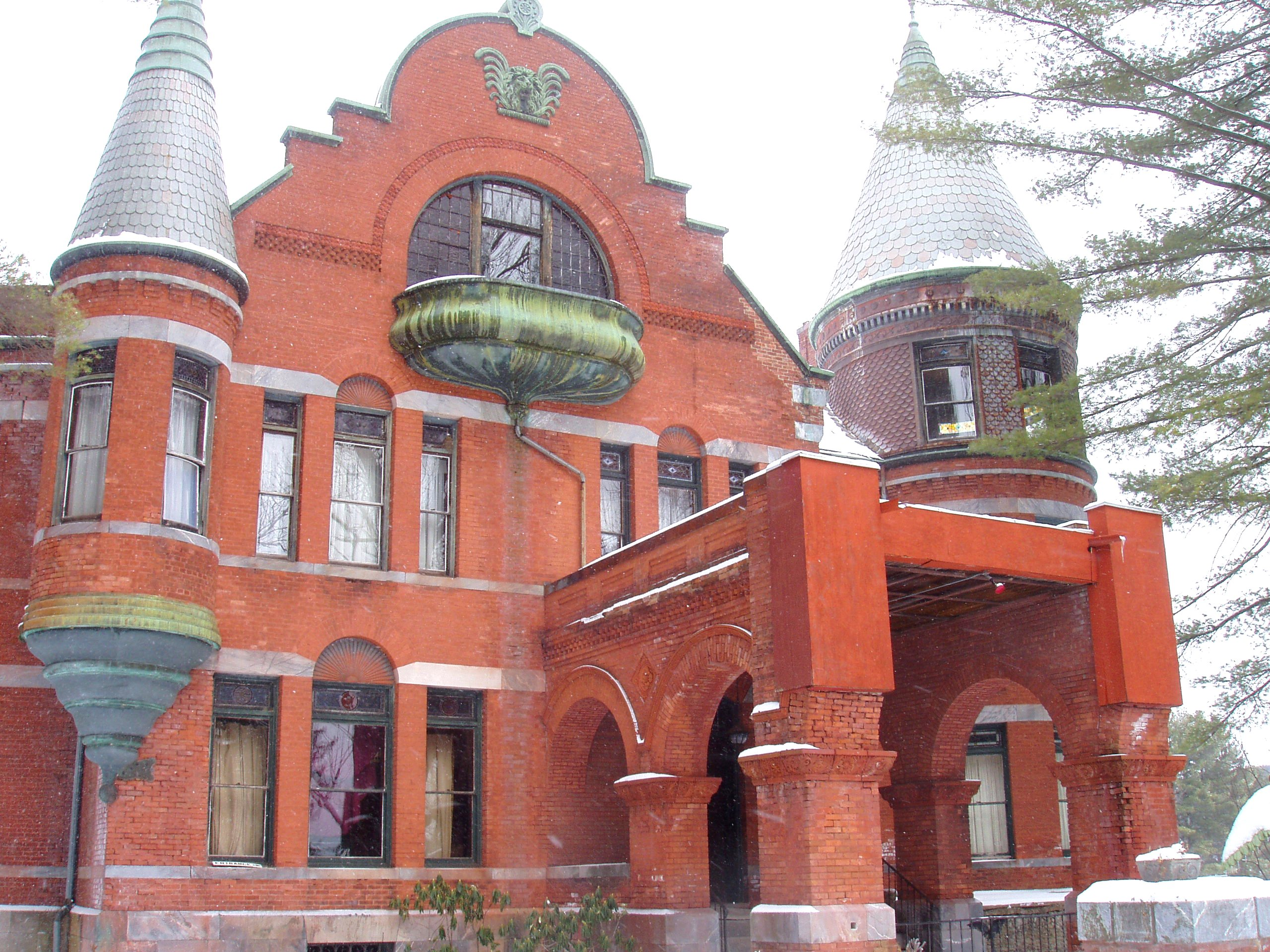
- The Dutch neo-renaissance gable and Romanesque Revival porte-cochere in front of Wilson Castle
- Location: 2708 West Street; Proctor, Vermont
- Coordinates: 43.6133°N 73.0295°W
- Type: Historic house museum
- Website: wilsoncastle.com

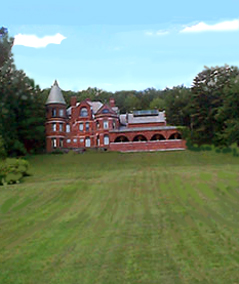
Wilson Castle from the east

Wilson Castle is a nineteenth-century estate located at Proctor in the U.S. state of Vermont. The house was built in 1885 in a mix of nineteenth-century architectural styles including Dutch neo-renaissance, Scottish baronial, Queen Anne, and Romanesque Revival. It is now operated as a house museum and is open late May until late October for an admission fee.

== History ==
The house was built by Vermont-born Dr. John Johnson, a physician, and his English wife. Planning and construction of the house lasted for nearly eight years and cost $1,300,000. Johnson met his wife in England while studying medicine, and he employed at least two English architects in the design of the house and its eighteen outbuildings. The Johnsons remained in the house only briefly. The castle was repossessed when Mrs. Johnson died, and Dr. Johnson was unable to afford taxes or maintenance. Antiques and valuables were auctioned off or taken by unpaid employees and locals began to call the castle "Johnson's Folly."

From the 1880s until 1939, the property changed hands four times. In 1939, Herbert Lee Wilson, a pioneer in the AM radio field, purchased the estate and created radio station WHWB (AM) in its stable. Wilson joined the United States Army Signal Corps during the Second World War and retired in the 1950s with the rank of colonel. He died in 1981 and left the estate to his daughter, who died in 2009. Five generations of the Wilson family have lived at the house since 1939. The house has been open for tours since 1962.

== Characteristics ==
Set on 115 acres (0.47 km^{2}) of grounds, the house contains 32 rooms on 3 stories. Its facade is built of English brick and French marble in a fanciful architecture with 19 proscenium arches, 84 stained glass windows, 2 turrets, parapet, and balcony. Its interior includes 13 fireplaces finished with imported tiles and bronze. Furnishings include Asian and European antiques, statuary, Chinese scrolls, and oriental rugs. The property also has a large orangery (greenhouse or conservatory) and an aviary.
