= Proctor, Vermont =

- Town
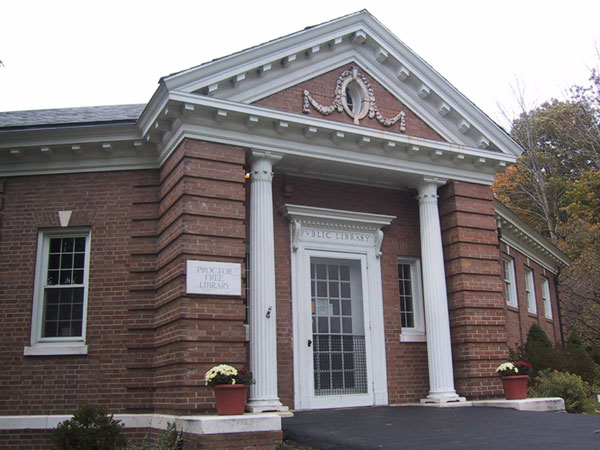
- Proctor Free Library

- Seal

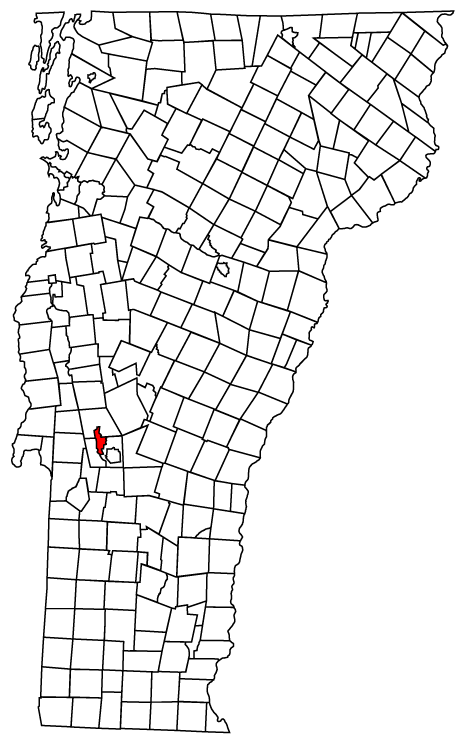
- Proctor, Vermont
- Coordinates: 43°38′05″N 73°02′10″W
- Country: United States
- State: Vermont
- County: Rutland
- Chartered: 1886

Area
  - Total: 7.6 sq mi (19.7 km^{2})
  - Land: 7.6 sq mi (19.6 km^{2})
  - Water: 0.039 sq mi (0.1 km^{2})
- Elevation: 466 ft (142 m)

Population (2020)
  - Total: 1,763
  - Density: 233/sq mi (89.9/km^{2})
- Time zone: UTC-5 (Eastern (EST))
  - Summer (DST): UTC-4 (EDT)
- ZIP code: 05765
- Area code: 802
- FIPS code: 50-57250
- GNIS feature ID: 1462180
- Website: proctorvermont.com

Proctor is a town in Rutland County, Vermont, United States. The population was 1,763 at the 2020 census. Proctor is home to the Vermont Marble Museum and Wilson Castle.

== History ==
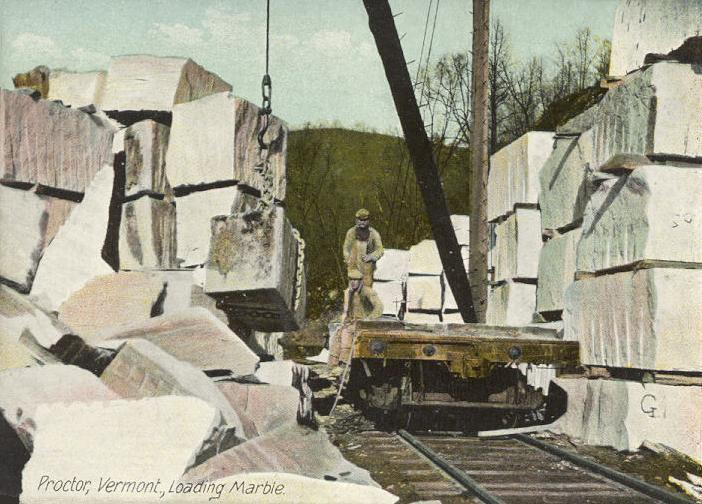
Loading marble in 1908

In the early 19th century, small high-quality marble deposits were discovered in Rutland, and in the 1830s a large deposit of nearly solid marble of high quality was found in what is now West Rutland. By the 1840s small firms had begun operations, but marble quarries only became profitable when the railroad came to Rutland in 1851. At the same time, the famous quarries of Carrara in Tuscany, Italy, became largely unworkable because of their extreme depth, and Rutland quickly became one of the leading producers of marble in the world.

This fueled enough growth and investment that in 1886 the marble companies saw to it that when the present Rutland City was incorporated as a village, most of the town was split off as West Rutland and Proctor, which between them contained the bulk of the marble quarries. Proctor was formed around the nucleus of the old Sutherland Falls from parts of Rutland and Pittsford. Proctor was named for and almost completely owned by Senator Redfield Proctor. The closing of the marble quarries in the town in the 1980s and 1990s cost the area many jobs, and Proctor has struggled much more than its neighbors. In 2004 the Proctor Marble Arch Bridge restoration project was the recipient of the Marble Institute Award of Merit for "commitment to preservation of the original stonework."

== Geography ==
According to the United States Census Bureau, the town has a total area of 7.6 square miles (20 km^{2}), of which 0.04 square miles (0.10 km^{2}), or 0.39%, is water. Drained by Otter Creek, Proctor lies between the Taconic Range and Green Mountains. The northern half of the town, home of unincorporated Proctor village, is the Proctor census-designated place.

The town is crossed by Vermont Route 3.

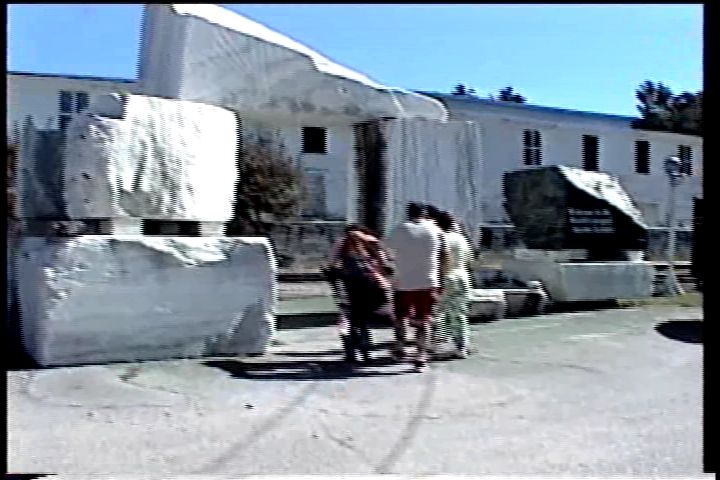
Vermont Marble Museum

== Demographics ==
Historical population
Census	Pop.	Note	%±
1890	1,758		—
1900	2,136		21.5%
1910	2,871		34.4%
1920	2,789		−2.9%
1930	2,596		−6.9%
1940	2,292		−11.7%
1950	1,917		−16.4%
1960	2,102		9.7%
1970	2,095		−0.3%
1980	1,998		−4.6%
1990	1,979		−1.0%
2000	1,877		−5.2%
2010	1,741		−7.2%
2020	1,763		1.3%
U.S. Decennial Census

As of the census of 2000, there were 1,877 people, 756 households, and 530 families residing in the town. The population density was 248.2 inhabitants per square mile (95.8 inhabitants/km^{2}). There were 791 housing units at an average density of 104.6 units per square mile (40.4 units/km^{2}). The racial makeup of the town was 99.04% White, 0.16% African American, 0.11% Native American, 0.05% Asian, 0.05% Pacific Islander, 0.05% from other races, and 0.53% from two or more races. Hispanic or Latino of any race were 0.59% of the population.

There were 756 households, out of which 33.6% had children under the age of 18 living with them, 55.3% were married couples living together, 12.0% had a female householder with no husband present, and 29.8% were non-families. 24.9% of all households were made up of individuals, and 13.0% had someone living alone who was 65 years of age or older. The average household size was 2.48 and the average family size was 2.94.

In the town, the population was spread out, with 26.2% under the age of 18, 5.1% from 18 to 24, 28.6% from 25 to 44, 23.6% from 45 to 64, and 16.6% who were 65 years of age or older. The median age was 39 years. For every 100 females, there were 87.7 males. For every 100 females age 18 and over, there were 83.8 males.

The median income for a household in the town was $39,773, and the median income for a family was $45,625. Males had a median income of $33,214 versus $25,197 for females. The per capita income for the town was $18,214. About 6.8% of families and 9.2% of the population were below the poverty line, including 10.9% of those under age 18 and 13.0% of those age 65 or over.

== Notable people ==
- Bernard Joseph Flanagan, bishop
- F. Ray Keyser, 72nd governor of Vermont
- Earle B. McLaughlin, U.S. Marshal for Vermont
- Frank Charles Partridge, US senator
- Fletcher Dutton Proctor, 51st governor of Vermont
- Mortimer Robinson Proctor, 66th governor of Vermont
- Redfield Proctor, secretary of war, US senator, and 37th governor of Vermont
- Redfield Proctor, Jr., 59th governor of Vermont
- Caitlin Canty, singer

== Sites of interest ==
- Gorham Covered Bridge
- Vermont Marble Museum
- Wilson Castle
