= Rutland-3 Vermont Representative District, 2012–2022 =

Coordinates: 43.64°N 73.21°W

The Rutland-3 Representative District is a two-member state Representative district in the U.S. state of Vermont. It is one of the 104 one or two member districts into which the state was divided by the redistricting and reapportionment plan developed by the Vermont General Assembly following the 2010 U.S. census. The plan applies to legislatures elected in 2012, 2014, 2016, 2018, 2020. A new plan will be developed following the 2020 U.S. census.

The Rutland-3 District includes all of the Rutland County towns of Castleton, Fair Haven, Hubbardton, and West Haven.

As of the 2010 census, the state as a whole had a population of 625,741. As there are a total of 150 representatives, there were 4,172 residents per representative (or 8,343 residents per two representatives). The two member Rutland-2 District had a population of 8,871 in that same census, 6.32% above the state average. (Vermont Legislature)

== District Representatives ==
- William Canfield, Republican, 2012–2014, 2015–2016, 2017–2018.
- Robert Helm, Republican, 2012–2014, 2015–2016, 2017–2018.

== Candidates for 2018 ==
Candidate information obtained from Vermont Secretary of State website.

- William "Bob" Canfield, Republican
- Robert "Bill" Helm, Republican
- Robert J. Richards, independent

== See also ==
- Members of the Vermont House of Representatives, 2005-2006 session
- Vermont Representative Districts, 2002-2012
