= Fort Vengeance Monument Site =

- U.S. National Register of Historic Places
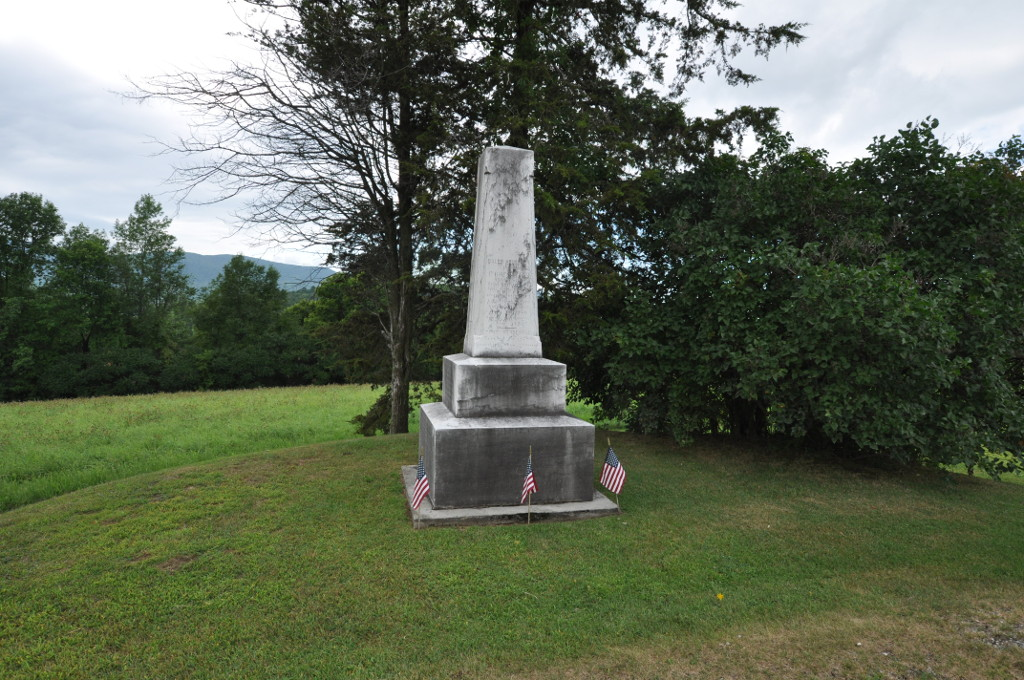

- Location within Vermont Location within the United States
- Location: US 7, 0.57 mi. S of town line, Pittsford, Vermont
- Coordinates: 43°44′51″N 73°2′53″W
- Area: 2 acres (0.81 ha)
- Built: 1774
- NRHP reference No.: 06000139
- Added to NRHP: March 15, 2006

The Fort Vengeance Monument Site is an archaeological and commemorative site on United States Route 7 in northern Pittsford, Vermont. The site includes the archaeological remains of one of Vermont's oldest documented homesteads, and the only surviving site of a military fortification of the American Revolutionary War. The site is marked by a stone memorial placed in 1873, and was listed on the National Register of Historic Places in 2006.

== Description and history ==
During the American Revolution in 1777 British General John Burgoyne came south from Montreal with a large force to attack Fort Ticonderoga and Fort Crown Point on Lake Champlain, and ultimately to meet British forces from New York City and divide the Colonies in half. The British campaign relied upon Native Americans to raid settlers and towns along the lake and inland. After a series of such raids, in which settlers' farms were plundered and burned, and male settlers were taken captive, in early 1780 Fort Vengeance was built to protect the area. Major Ebenezer Allen was placed in command with a garrison of one hundred and fifty men. After Caleb Houghton, aged 30, one of the soldiers comprising the garrison under Major Allen, was found a half-mile from the fort shot, tomahawked and scalped, Major Allen named the new fort "Fort Vengeance." The best known British instigated raid in the fall of 1780 was the Royalton raid, in which the towns of Royalton, Sharon and Tunbridge along the White River in eastern Vermont were burned. The Fort Vengeance archaeological site is located on northern Pittsford, about 0.5 miles (0.80 km) south of the town line with Brandon in northern Rutland County. It is marked by a squat marble obelisk adjacent to a roadside pullout on the west side of United States Route 7. The site occupies about 2 acres (0.81 ha), most of which is west of the highway, but including a portion of US 7 which is believed to have been built over part of the site.

The site includes the archaeological remains of two houses. The older of the two was the farmstead of Caleb Hendee, who moved to the area and built his house here in 1774. At the time of the property's listing on the National Register, it was the oldest known farmstead site in the state, with no known sites predating 1770 (the state's colonial settlement history begins in the 1740s). In 1780 Hendee's farmstead became the site of Fort Vengeance, a palisaded fortification whose construction was ordered by the independent government of the Vermont Republic as part of its northern line of defense. The fort included a barracks, powder magazine, and other features, and was in use until 1782. It was one of three forts ordered by the state, all in the Pittsford-Brandon area, and is the only one whose location is both known and amenable to archaeological investigation. It is suspected that a portion of the modern road prism of US 7 encroaches on the site; construction of the road necessitated movement of the marker some 25 feet (7.6 m) west of its original placement.

Caleb Hendee's house was probably abandoned in the mid-19th century by his son Samuel, who built a Greek Revival farmhouse further south, and probably tore down the remains of the old house and fort. In 1858, Samuel sold most of the property to a future in-law, Chester Thomas. Thomas built the house that made the second homesite in 1860; this building was demolished about 1900.

== See also ==
- National Register of Historic Places listings in Rutland County, Vermont
