= Fort Warren (Vermont) =

Coordinates: 43°36′50″N 73°09′58″W

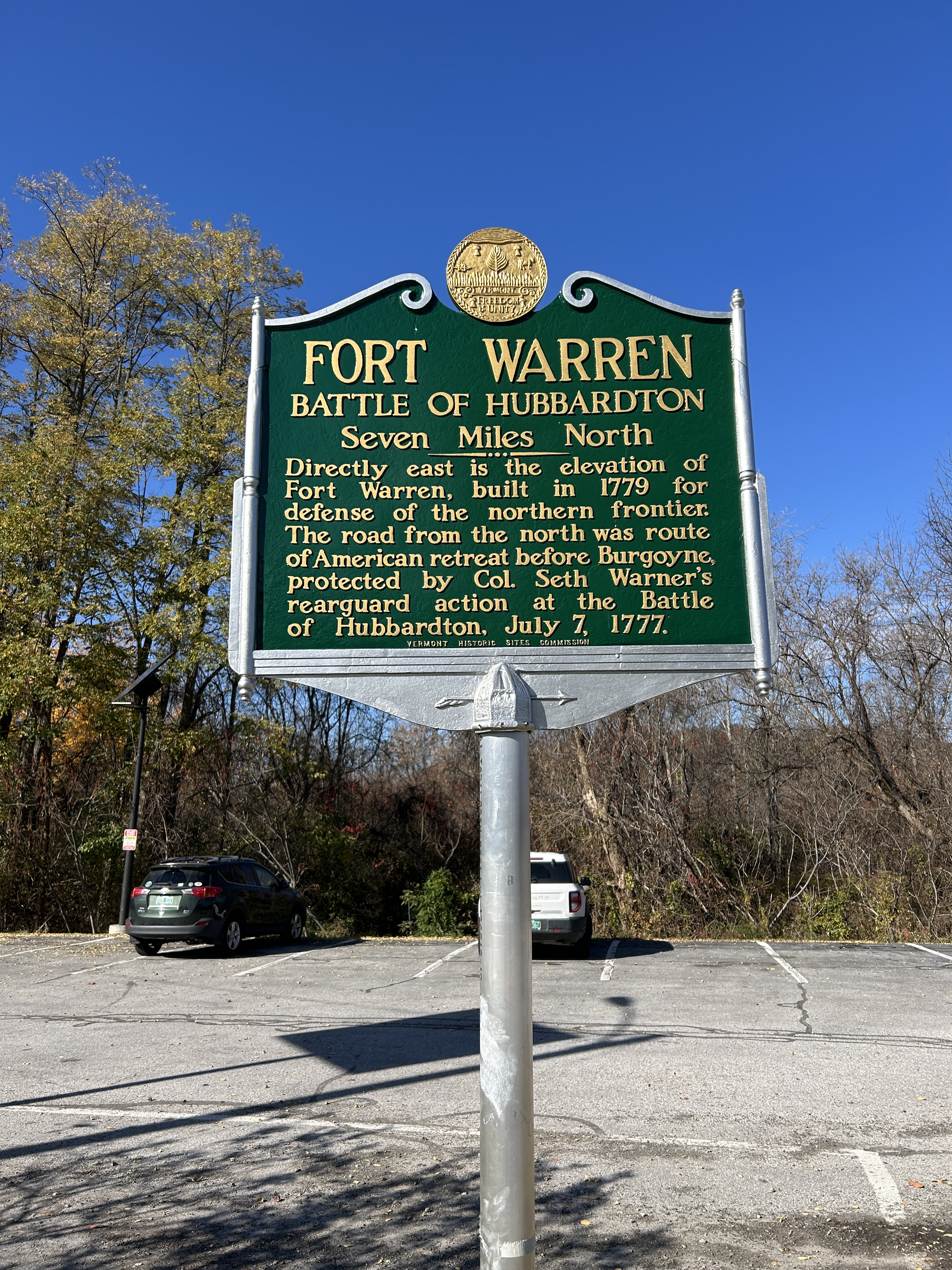
Fort Warren roadside historical marker, erected 1948.

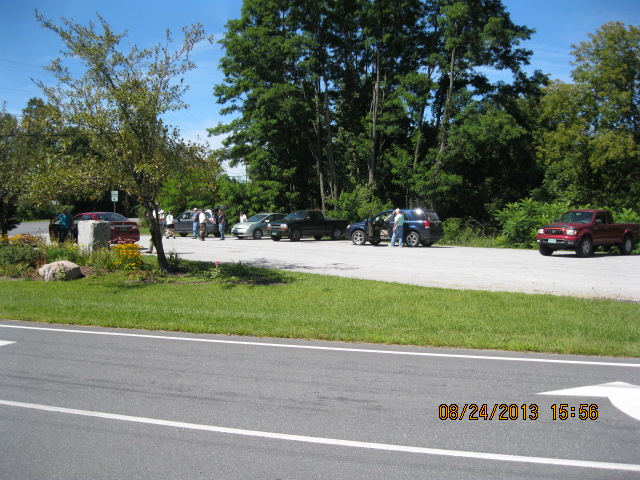
Location of Fort Warren as seen in 2013. The landscape and intersection where the fort once stood has been heavily altered since the Revolutionary War.

Fort Warren was a wooden stockade fort located in Castleton, Vermont, at the present-day intersection of East Hubbardton Road and Vermont Route 4a. Built during the Revolutionary War, construction began in 1778 and was completed by April 1779. The construction effort was begun by the residents of Castleton following the Skirmish of Castleton (1777), and assisted by the Vermont Troops under the newly-formed Vermont republic in early 1779. Between 1779 and the end of the war, Fort Warren operated in tandem with Forts Rutland, Ranger, and Vengeance in defending Vermont inhabitants on the "northern frontier," the military front declared by the Board of War between Vermont inhabitants and the "enemy." This front was defined as the north line of Castleton, the west and north lines of Pittsford, and to the Green Mountains to the east. Everyone living above said line had been cautioned to move south, as their safety could not be guaranteed by the state. The fort never encountered an enemy force like the one that had raided and skirmished with several Castleton residents in 1777, and it was deconstructed or otherwise dismantled when the Vermont Troops were disbanded in 1782.

== Works cited ==
Kinney, Joseph E. "The Cruel Indifference of Time: The Evolving Public Memory of the Eighteenth-Century Fortifications of Rutland County, Vermont." Vermont History, vol. 92, no. 2, 2024, pp. 72–96.
