= Pittsford, Vermont =

- Town
- Seal
- Motto: "Vermont's Sunshine Village"
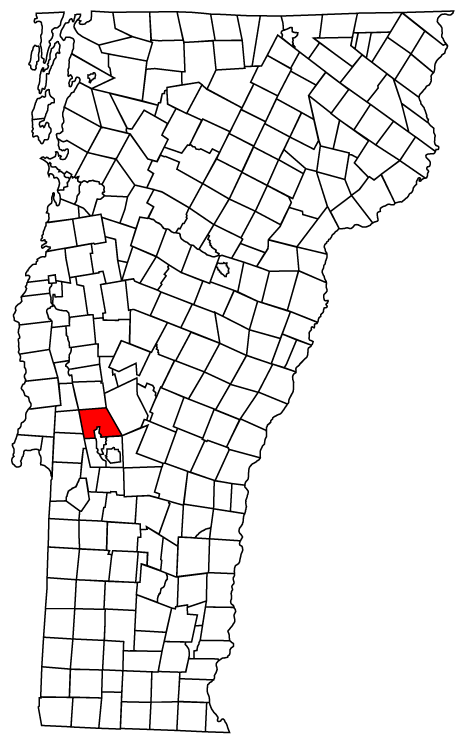
- Pittsford, Vermont
- Coordinates: 43°43′30″N 73°03′15″W
- Country: United States
- State: Vermont
- County: Rutland
- Communities: Pittsford; Florence

Area
  - Total: 43.6 sq mi (112.8 km^{2})
  - Land: 43.5 sq mi (112.6 km^{2})
  - Water: 0.077 sq mi (0.2 km^{2})
- Elevation: 358 ft (109 m)

Population (2020)
  - Total: 2,862
  - Density: 65.83/sq mi (25.42/km^{2})
- Time zone: UTC-5 (Eastern (EST))
  - Summer (DST): UTC-4 (EDT)
- ZIP Codes: 05763 (Pittsford); 05744 (Florence); 05733 (Brandon)
- Area code: 802
- FIPS code: 50-55600
- GNIS feature ID: 1462174
- Website: www.pittsfordvermont.com

Pittsford is a town in Rutland County, Vermont, United States. As of the 2020 census, the town population was 2,862. Named for William Pitt, it has two picket forts used in the American Revolutionary War.

== History ==
Pittsford was first settled as a frontier town in 1769, about 60 miles (97 km) north of Bennington. It is the location of two historical picket forts used by the militia during the American Revolutionary War: Fort Mott (built in 1777), and Fort Vengeance (built from 1780 to 1781), about a mile north.

The town of Pittsford, New York, was named by Colonel Caleb Hopkins after his hometown of Pittsford, Vermont, named after William Pitt.

The first settlers and founders of Pittsford were the Cooley half-brothers, Benjamin Cooley (b. 1747, d. 1790) and Gideon Cooley (b. 1731, d. abt 1800). Benjamin Cooley joined Ethan Allen, Benedict Arnold, and the rest of the Green Mountain Boys in the first victory of the Colonies over England: the Capture of Fort Ticonderoga on 10 May 1775.

== Geography ==
According to the United States Census Bureau, the town has a total area of 43.6 square miles (113 km^{2}), of which 43.5 square miles (113 km^{2}) is land and 0.1 square miles (0.26 km^{2}), or 0.18%, is water. The unincorporated village of Pittsford is in the center of the town.

== Demographics ==
Historical population
| Census | Pop. | Note | %± |
|---|---|---|---|
| 1790 | 850 | | — |
| 1800 | 1,413 | | 66.2% |
| 1810 | 1,936 | | 37.0% |
| 1820 | 1,916 | | −1.0% |
| 1830 | 2,005 | | 4.6% |
| 1840 | 1,927 | | −3.9% |
| 1850 | 2,026 | | 5.1% |
| 1860 | 1,839 | | −9.2% |
| 1870 | 2,127 | | 15.7% |
| 1880 | 1,982 | | −6.8% |
| 1890 | 1,775 | | −10.4% |
| 1900 | 1,866 | | 5.1% |
| 1910 | 2,479 | | 32.9% |
| 1920 | 2,098 | | −15.4% |
| 1930 | 2,332 | | 11.2% |
| 1940 | 2,093 | | −10.2% |
| 1950 | 2,076 | | −0.8% |
| 1960 | 2,225 | | 7.2% |
| 1970 | 2,306 | | 3.6% |
| 1980 | 2,590 | | 12.3% |
| 1990 | 2,919 | | 12.7% |
| 2000 | 3,140 | | 7.6% |
| 2010 | 2,991 | | −4.7% |
| 2020 | 2,862 | | −4.3% |
U.S. Decennial Census

As of the census of 2000, there were 3,140 people, 1,284 households, and 876 families residing in the town. The population density was 72.2 people per square mile (27.9/km^{2}). There were 1,388 housing units at an average density of 31.9 per square mile (12.3/km^{2}). The racial makeup of the town was 99.08% White, 0.22% African American, 0.06% Native American, 0.19% Asian, and 0.45% from two or more races. Hispanic or Latino of any race were 0.41% of the population.

There were 1,284 households, out of which 29.7% had children under the age of 18 living with them, 56.2% were married couples living together, 8.3% had a female householder with no husband present, and 31.7% were non-families. 23.8% of all households were made up of individuals, and 9.3% had someone living alone who was 65 years of age or older. The average household size was 2.44 and the average family size was 2.88.

In the town, the population was spread out, with 23.2% under the age of 18, 6.1% from 18 to 24, 30.0% from 25 to 44, 27.6% from 45 to 64, and 13.2% who were 65 years of age or older. The median age was 40 years. For every 100 females, there were 99.9 males. For every 100 females age 18 and over, there were 93.7 males.

The median income for a household in the town was $40,027, and the median income for a family was $44,079. Males had a median income of $34,769 versus $24,342 for females. The per capita income for the town was $19,271. About 6.0% of families and 9.0% of the population were below the poverty line, including 9.4% of those under age 18 and 5.6% of those age 65 or over.

== Notable people ==
- George D. Chafee, Illinois lawyer and legislator
- Thomas E. Drew, former Adjutant General of Vermont and resident of the village of Florence
- Frederic Williams Hopkins, Adjutant General of Vermont, 1837–1852
- Samuel Hopkins, holder of first American patent, for pearl and potash process (1790)
- Jake Lacy, actor (Casey in Better with You, Pete in "The Office"); grew up in Pittsford
- John Lowth, Wisconsin lawyer and legislator
- Emma A. Winslow, home economist, researcher, writer

== Sites of interest ==
- Colburn Bridge
- Cooley Covered Bridge
- Depot Covered Bridge
- Fort Vengeance Monument Site
- Gorham Covered Bridge
- Hammond Covered Bridge
- Maclure Library
- Pittsford Green Historic District
- Thomas H. Palmer House
