= Florence, Vermont =

- Unincorporated community
- Location within Vermont
- Coordinates: 43°42′59″N 73°03′41″W
- Country: United States
- State: Vermont
- County: Rutland
- Town: Pittsford
- ZIP code: 05744

Florence is an unincorporated community in the town of Pittsford, Rutland County, Vermont, United States. A post office was established in Florence in 1882.
