= Vermont Marble Museum =

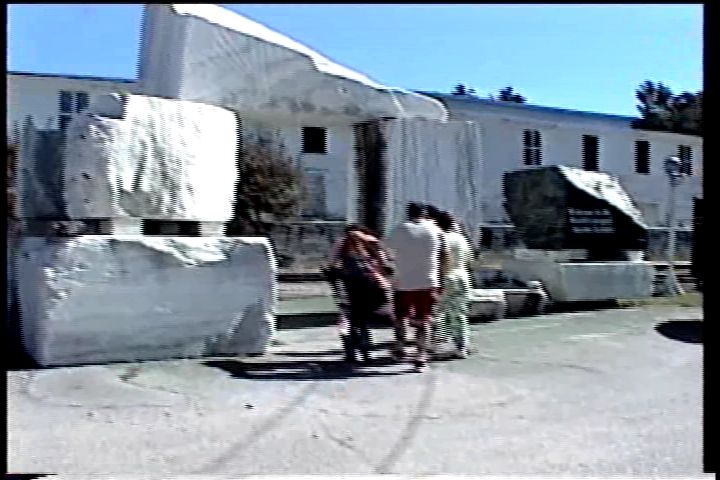
- Location: 52 Main Street; Proctor, Vermont, United States
- Coordinates: 43.66232°N 73.03509°W
- Type: Art, industry museum
- Website: www.vermont-marble.com

The Vermont Marble Museum or Vermont Marble Exhibit was a museum commemorating the contributions of Vermont marble and the Vermont Marble Company, located in Proctor, Vermont, United States. The museum was located in a wing of one of the former Vermont Marble Company buildings. It operated for nearly 90 years before permanently closing in 2024.

== Vermont Marble Company ==
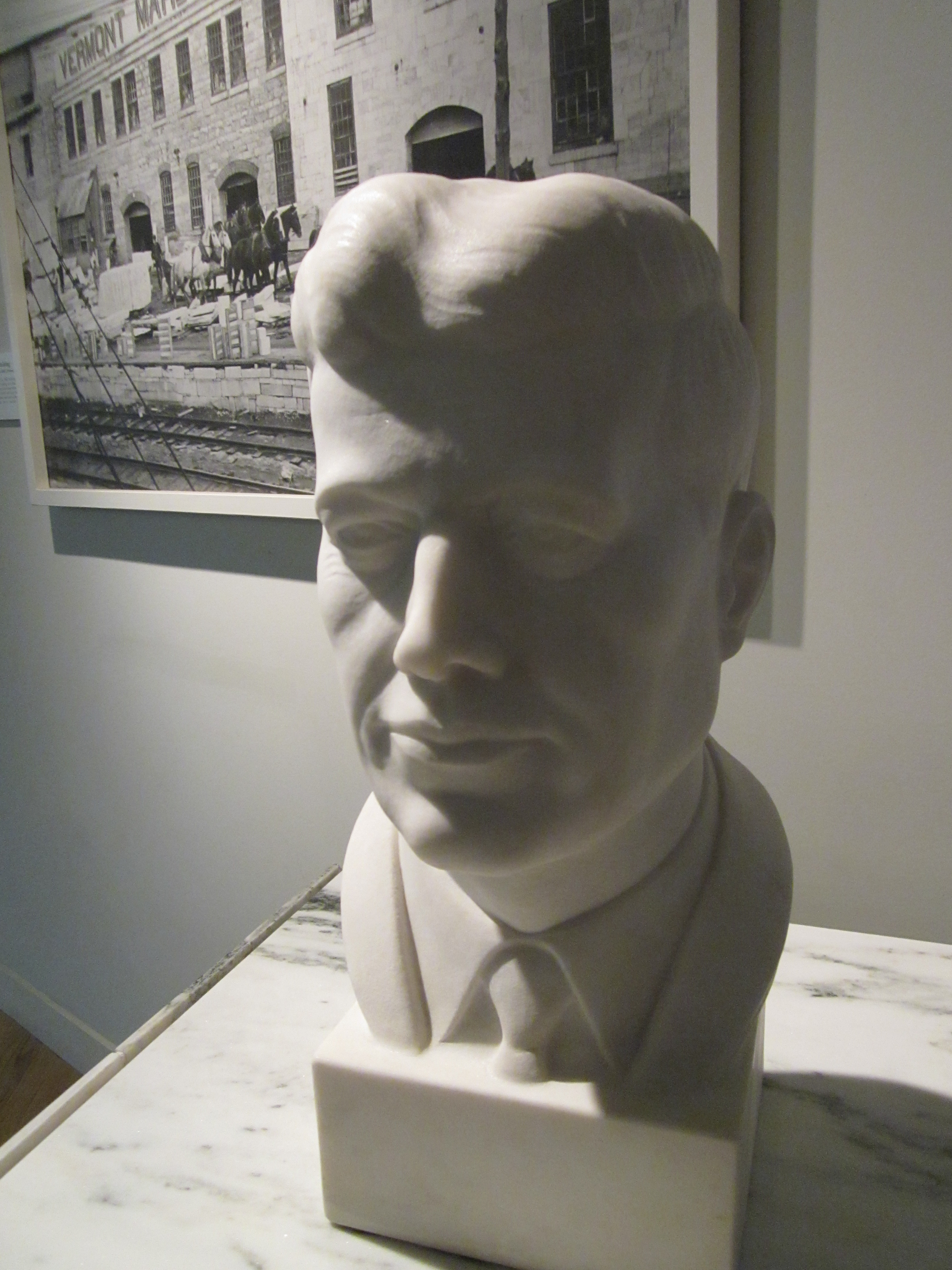
Marble bust of President John F. Kennedy

The Vermont Marble Company was founded in 1880 by businessman and politician Redfield Proctor, who served as the company's first president. Marble was quarried from several locations in the town of Proctor, then called Sutherland Falls, and the surrounding communities of Rutland, West Rutland and Danby. As railroads arrived in Rutland and Proctor, the Vermont Marble Company became one of the largest producers of marble in the world. It provided marble for the construction of such notable icons as the USS Arizona Memorial, the West Virginia State Capitol, the Oregon State Capitol, the United States Supreme Court Building, the Arlington National Cemetery, and Yale University's Beinecke Rare Book and Manuscript Library to name a few. The Tomb of the Unknown Soldier was also created there. The surrounding town was named after Redfield Proctor and became a company town.

The buildings and quarries of the Vermont Marble Company are now owned by OMYA, a supplier of industrial minerals.

== Exhibit ==
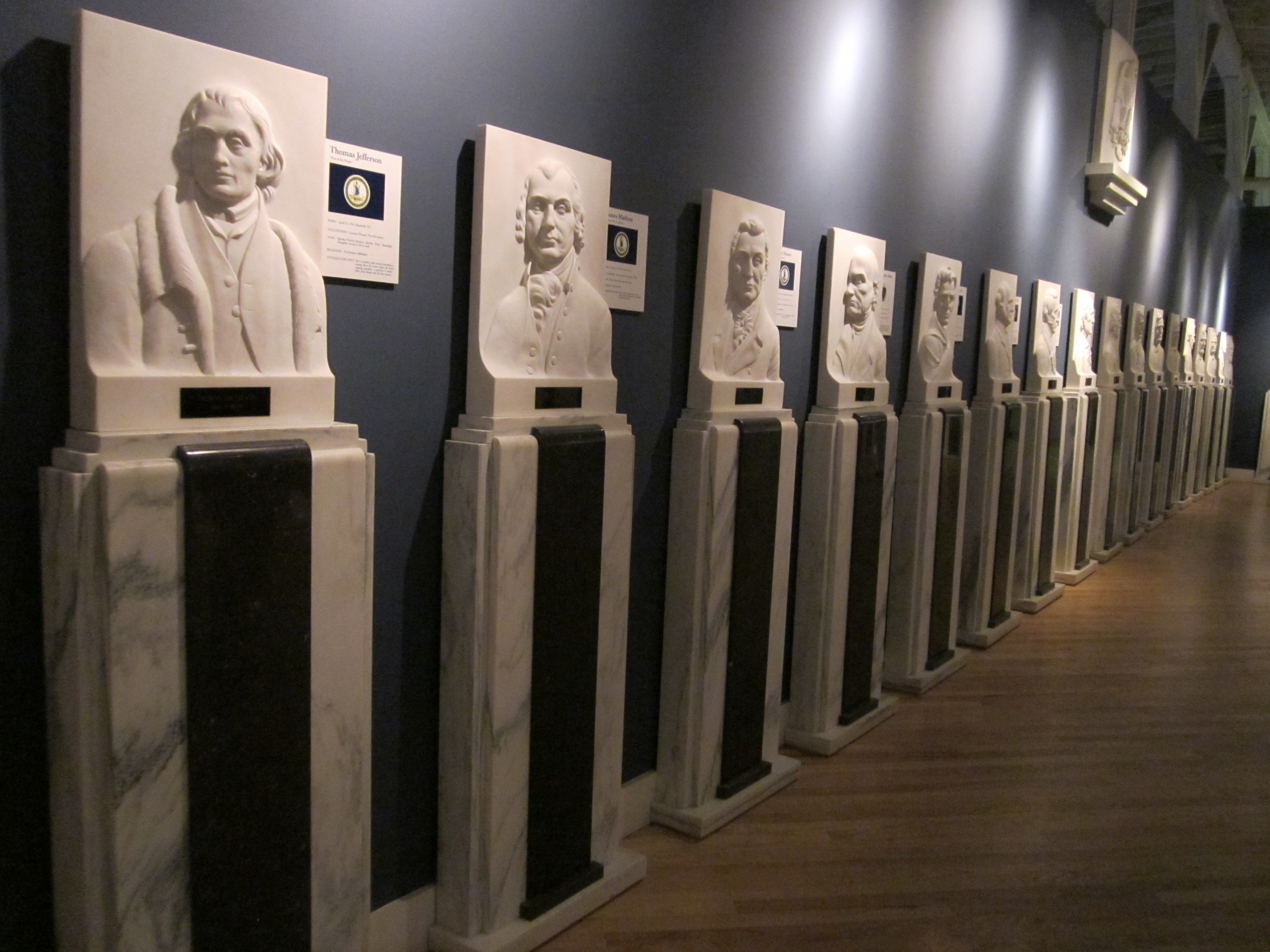
Hall of Presidents - reliefs carved from marble

The exhibit offered self-guided tours focusing on the company's history, the geology of marble and other local stones, and the uses of marble in art, architecture, and industry. A short video narrated the history of the Vermont Marble Company, and historical photographs of VMC workers quarrying, carving, and shipping Vermont marble were displayed throughout the exhibit. Several geologic exhibits, including an artificial cave and a preserved triceratops skeleton were also on display. A display contained large slabs of decorative stone, including the local Danby white and deep green verde antique. This display also included local granites and imported marbles. Numerous sculptures, including busts of nearly all the U.S. presidents, The Last Supper, and other works were scattered throughout the museum. An artists' studio allowed visitors to watch carving demonstrations and ask questions of local sculptors. The architectural uses of marble were displayed in a small chapel and a modern kitchen and bathroom surfaced in stone. Visitors could also get a balcony view of one of the large 19th-century warehouses of the Vermont Marble Company, now used by OMYA.

A nearby quarry (now defunct), located about a quarter mile from the museum itself, was added to the exhibit in 2015. The grounds around the exhibit hold large chunks of quarried, unfinished marble. The Preservation Trust of Vermont acquired the Vermont Marble Company in 2014.

Also, the town of Proctor has many sidewalks made of marble, and the high school and Catholic church are both faced in local stone. Most of the buildings of the former Vermont Marble Company still stand, and many are constructed of Vermont marble.

After marble production ceased in the town, attendance at the museum began to decrease. Bus tours comprised the majority of visitors, and the museum began to financially struggle. Exhibits could not be updated and the museum could not afford to employ any full time staff. Finally, after temporary closure due to the pandemic, it reopened briefly. But after several attempts to make the museum viable, it quietly closed permanently in the Fall of 2024.

== Website ==
- Vermont Marble Museum
