= Fort Mott (Vermont) =

Coordinates: 43.5799°N 73.0364°W

Fort Mott, located in Pittsford, Vermont, was a picket fort used by American militiamen during the American Revolutionary War. The fort was constructed by the citizens of Pittsford as a sanctuary in case of approaching British troops or hostile Native Americans. The Battle of Hubbardton was the only major battle fought in Vermont during the war. Just before the battle, fought on July 7, 1777, the townspeople of Pittsford had to evacuate the town. Those that returned decided to build the fort for their own protection; construction was finished later that same year. It is located on the east bank of the Otter Creek, which provided the fort's fresh water. It was only later named Fort Mott, after, the fort's commander, John Mott.

== Sources ==
- American Forts Network: Fort Mott
- The History of Rutland County, Part III: The Colonial Period
