= Fort Ranger =

Coordinates: 43°36′16″N 73°00′42″W

Fort Ranger was a historical picket fort located near Rutland, Vermont, United States. The fort was constructed prior to May 1779. Fort Ranger served as the headquarters for the Vermont state force during the American Revolutionary War. Thomas Chittenden ordered Captain Thomas Sawyer to command Fort Ranger and scout for any British incursion from the north or near Lake Champlaign.

After the war, Fort Ranger was used for community gatherings. In 1903, a marble fountain was placed at the site of Fort Ranger by the Daughters of the American Revolution. Nothing remains of the site of Fort Ranger today.

== Sources ==
- Hall, Hiland (1868). The History of Vermont: From Its Discovery to Its Admission Into the Union in 1791. Albany, New York: Joel Munsell.
- Kinney, Joseph E. (2024). "The Cruel Indifference of Time: The Evolving Public Memory of the Eighteenth-Century Fortifications of Rutland County, Vermont" (PDF). Vermont History. 92 (2). Vermont Historical Society. ISSN 0042-4161.
