= Otter Creek (Vermont) =

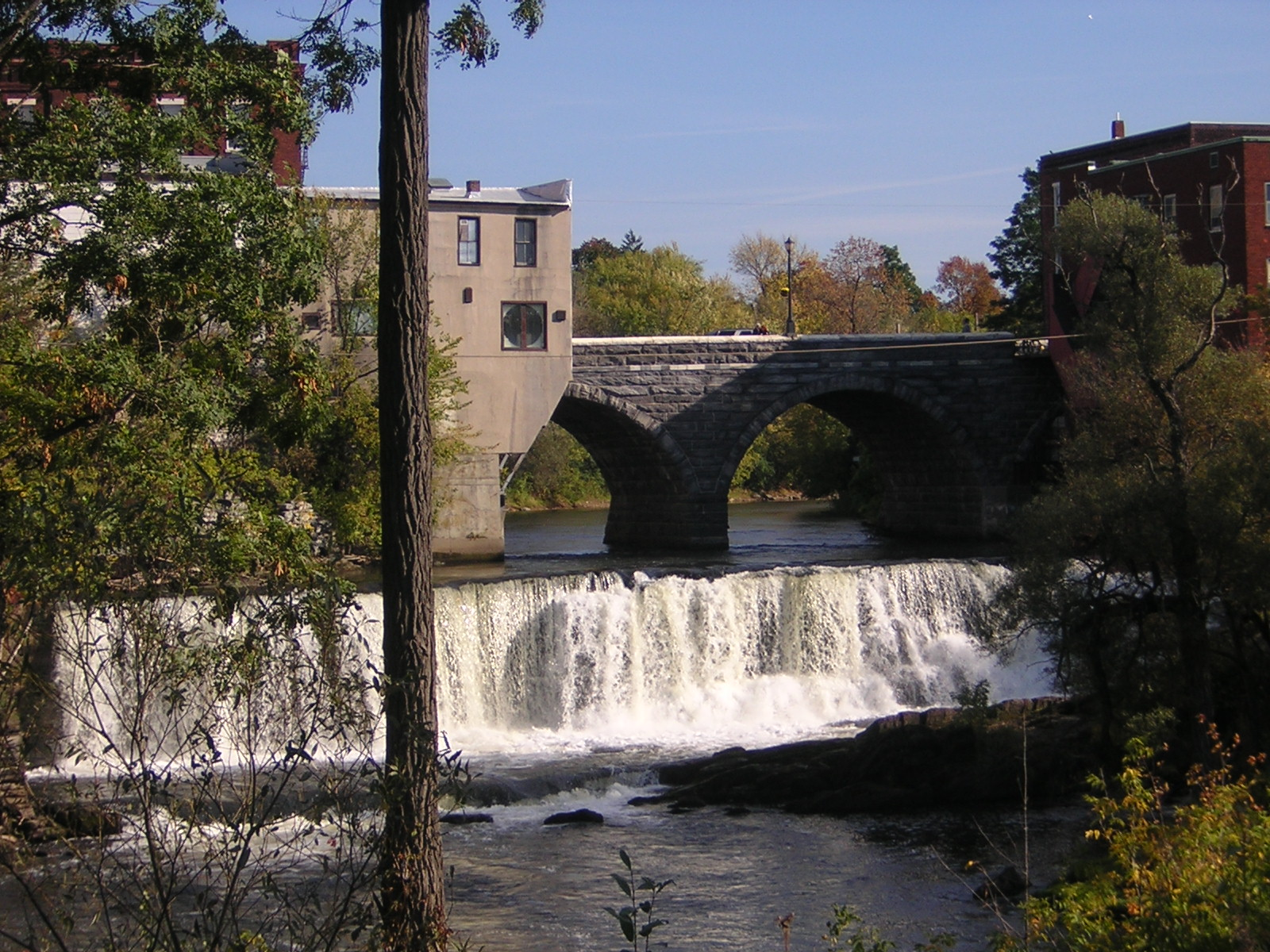
- Otter Creek Falls in Middlebury

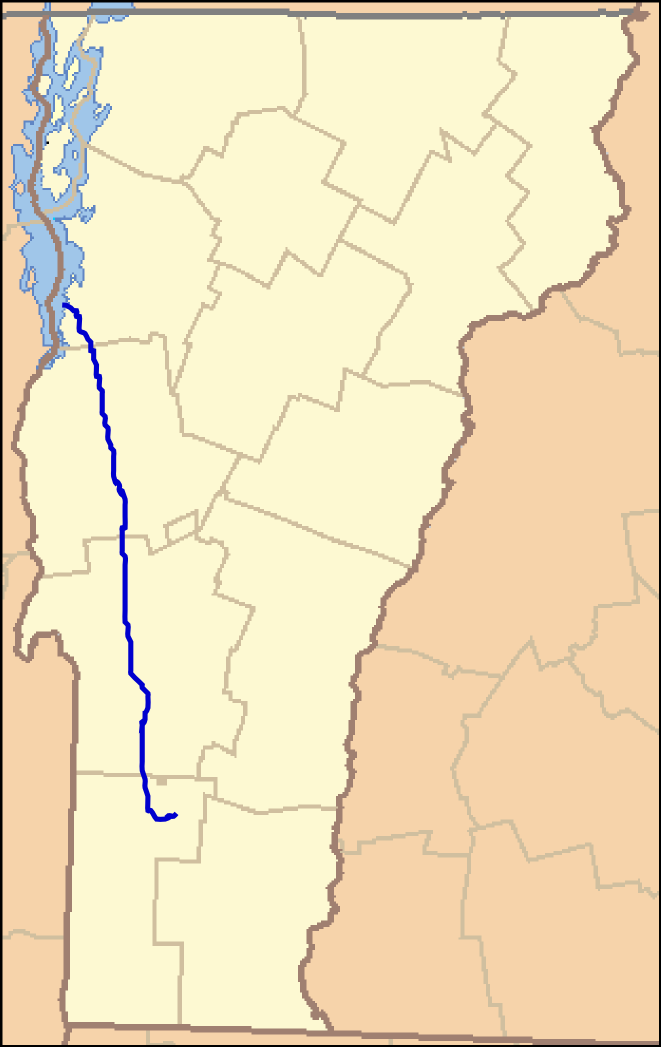
- Course of Otter Creek

Location
- Country: United States
- State: Vermont
- Counties: Bennington, Rutland, Addison
- Towns/Cities: Wallingford, Rutland, Brandon, Middlebury, Vergennes

Physical characteristics
- Source
  - location: Peru, Vermont
  - coordinates: 43.28024°N 72.97545°W
  - elevation: 2,500 ft (760 m)
- Mouth: Fort Cassin Point, Lake Champlain
  - location: Ferrisburgh
  - coordinates: 44.2256084°N 73.3248477°W
  - elevation: 29 m (95 ft)
- Length: 112 mi (180 km)
- Discharge
  - location: Middlebury
  - average: 1,044 cu ft/s (29.6 m^{3}/s)

Otter Creek is the longest river entirely contained within the borders of Vermont. Roughly 112 miles (180 km) long, it is the primary watercourse running through Rutland County and Addison County. The mouth of the river flows into Lake Champlain.

Settled by indigenous peoples at least 10-11,000 years ago, the river was an important economic region for indigenous people before European settlement. The river became an important economic region for settlers, who took advantage of the river for agriculture and industry through the 18th and 19th centuries.

== History ==
Before European settlement, the river valley was settled by native peoples including the Abenaki, who called it Wnegigwtegw, meaning "Otter River". The river was known to early settlers as the "Indian road" because of its importance to navigating Abenaki, Algonquin and Iroquois settlements in the region. Archeological evidence suggest both war parties and trading happened between communities on the river.

Otter Creek (or "Kill") was known to the French as "La Rivière aux Loutres", whence the English name. On April 1, 1690, Capt. Abraham Schuyler was commissioned by the city of Albany to take a party up the Otter Creek about 7 miles (11 km) and there to keep watch and engage any Native Americans. This would correspond today to the City of Vergennes. In 1731, the French began construction of a fort at Crown Point to be known as Fort Frederic. Before commencing, they founded a new settlement called Addison. With increase awareness of the valley's fertile land, the 18th century saw increased settlement by white settlers.

Vergennes, situated on the first falls, 7 miles (11 km) upstream from the outlet of Otter Creek, was one of the first industrial hubs on the river, with a sawmill erected in 1764.

In 1814, a fleet was hastily, but effectively, assembled here by American forces at Vergennes, to participate in the Battle of Plattsburg.

During the 1800s, communities began to harness the rivers' quick waters for industrial purposes creating hydropower facilities in Rutland, Proctor, Brandon, Middlebury, Weybridge, and Vergennes.

During flooding caused by Tropical Storm Irene, Otter Creek flooded in downtown Rutland causing millions of dollars in damage.

== Geography ==
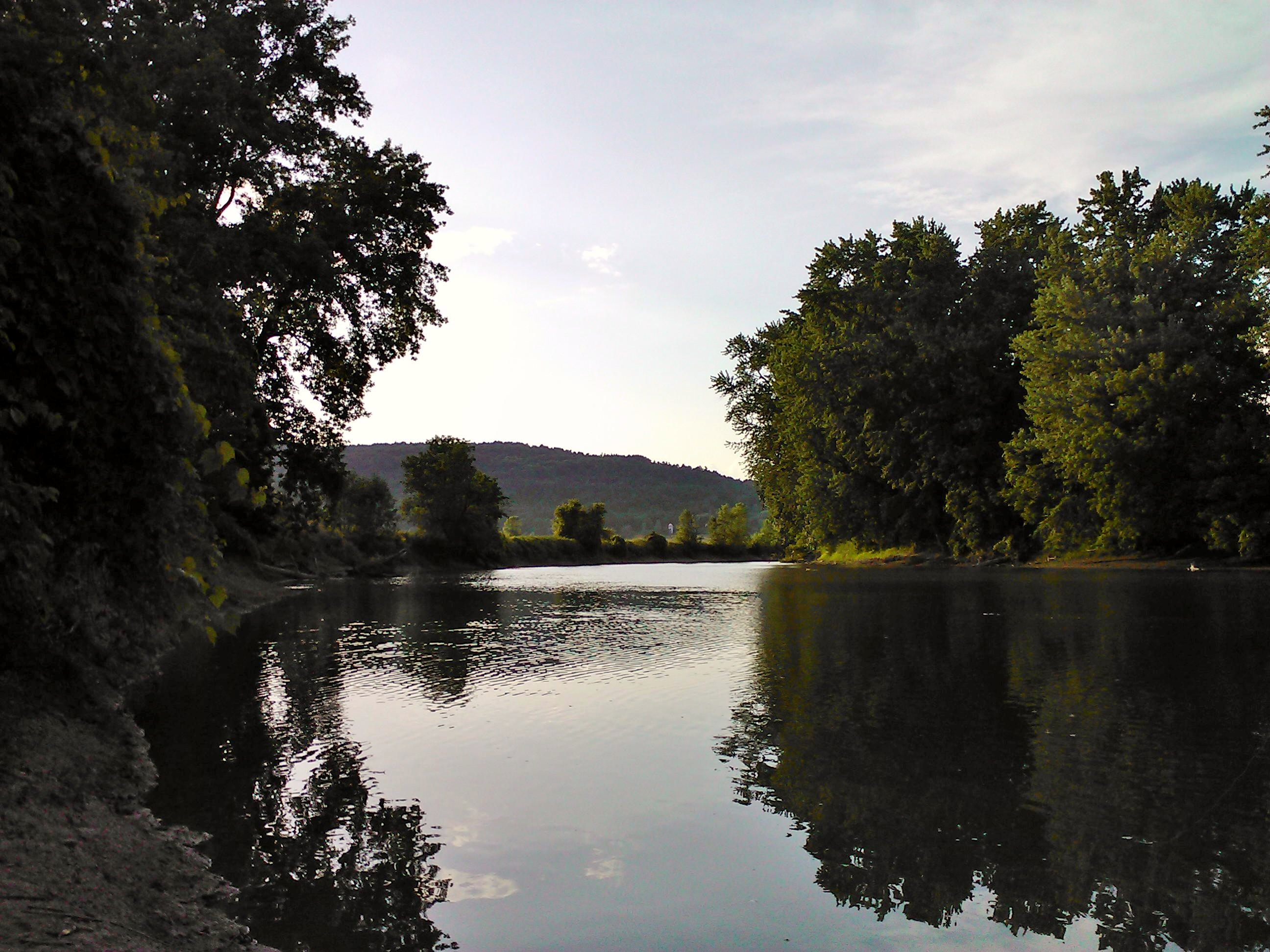
The Otter Creek in Weybridge just north of the Lemon Fair River

Otter Creek rises in the Green Mountain National Forest on the western slopes of Mt. Tabor in the town of Peru in Bennington County, and flows southwesterly into the town of Dorset towards East Dorset, thence veering northward into Emerald Lake. Thence it runs northward passing through the towns of Danby, Wallingford, Clarendon, and Rutland town, the city of Rutland, and the towns of Proctor, Pittsford, and Brandon, all in Rutland County. On entering Addison County, it generally forms the boundary between various towns. It next passes through Middlebury, Weybridge and Vergennes and eventually empties into Lake Champlain at Ferrisburgh.

The stretch of water between the mouth at Fort Cassin Point, Lake Champlain (the site of the former Fort Cassin) and Vergennes is passable by boat, and is frequented by motor boats, canoes, and kayaks. Indeed, Vergennes was a shipyard of some importance in the various wars of the 18th century. Many nesting platforms have been built along the creek, so one is likely to see both osprey and bald eagles in the area.

Otter Creek has a falls in the town of Middlebury, the site chosen in 1800 to be Vermont's original seat of higher education, Middlebury College. In Addison and Rutland counties, Otter Creek passes through significant wetlands, in particular Cornwall Marsh, Little Otter Creek Marsh and the Brandon Swamp.

Because of its name, the unusual situation of a river emptying into a creek occurs several times along Otter Creek’s length. For a list of these tributaries, see Lake Champlain. The source and mouth are separated by 68 miles (109 km) distance—the (approximate) additional 44 miles (71 km) are due to meandering.

== Ecology ==
According to the Addison County Planning Commission, the creek has one of the "most intact, wide floodplains" in Vermont. The alder swamps, marshes and floodplains on the river absorb significant amounts of flooding from the river, and were never developed.

Water quality near Lake Champlain and the mouth of the Middlebury River are consistently poor, with high E. coli counts. The river is also the second largest source of phosphorus pollution to Lake Champlain.

== Gallery ==
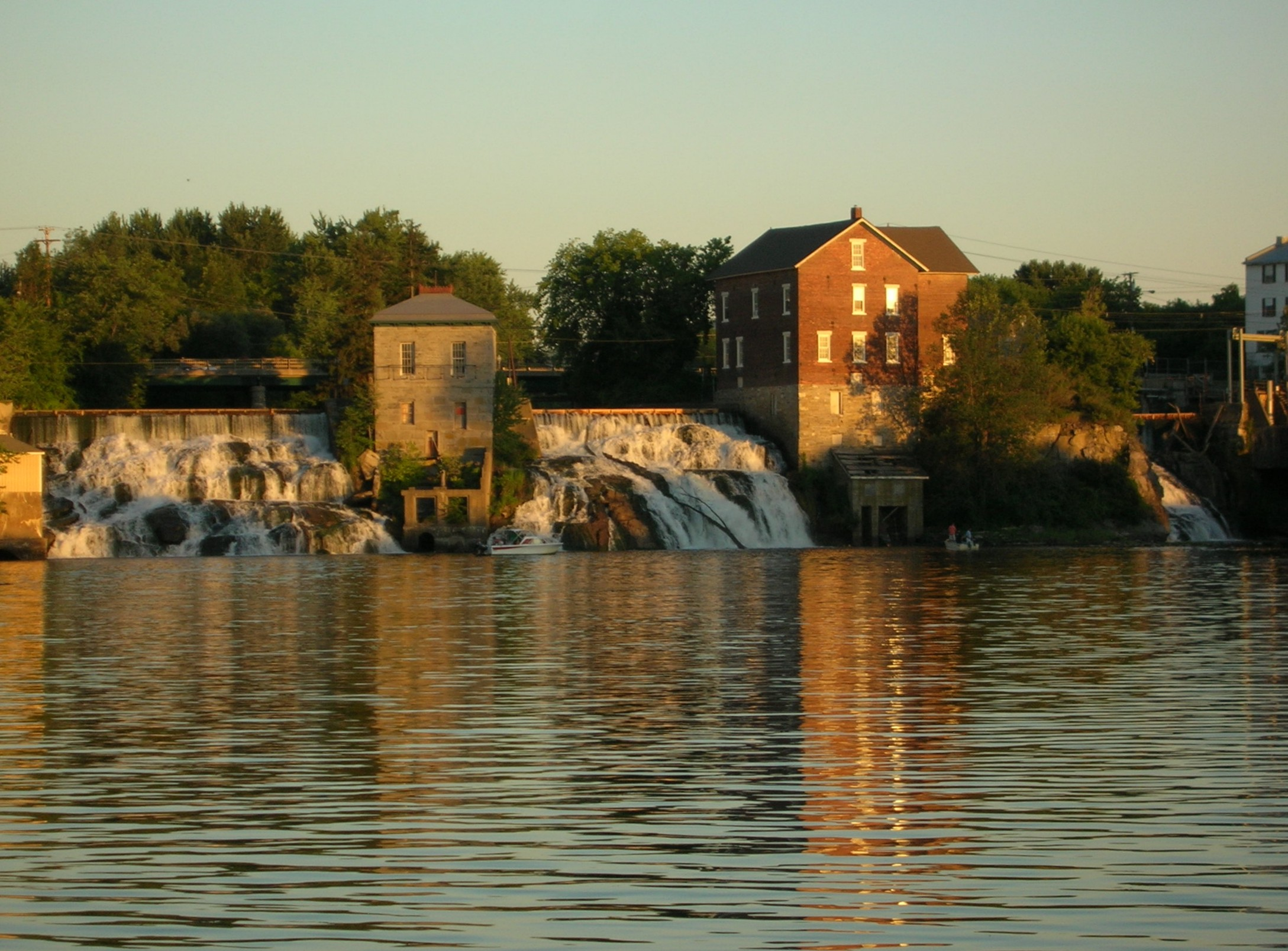
View of falls on Otter Creek from Vergennes town dock

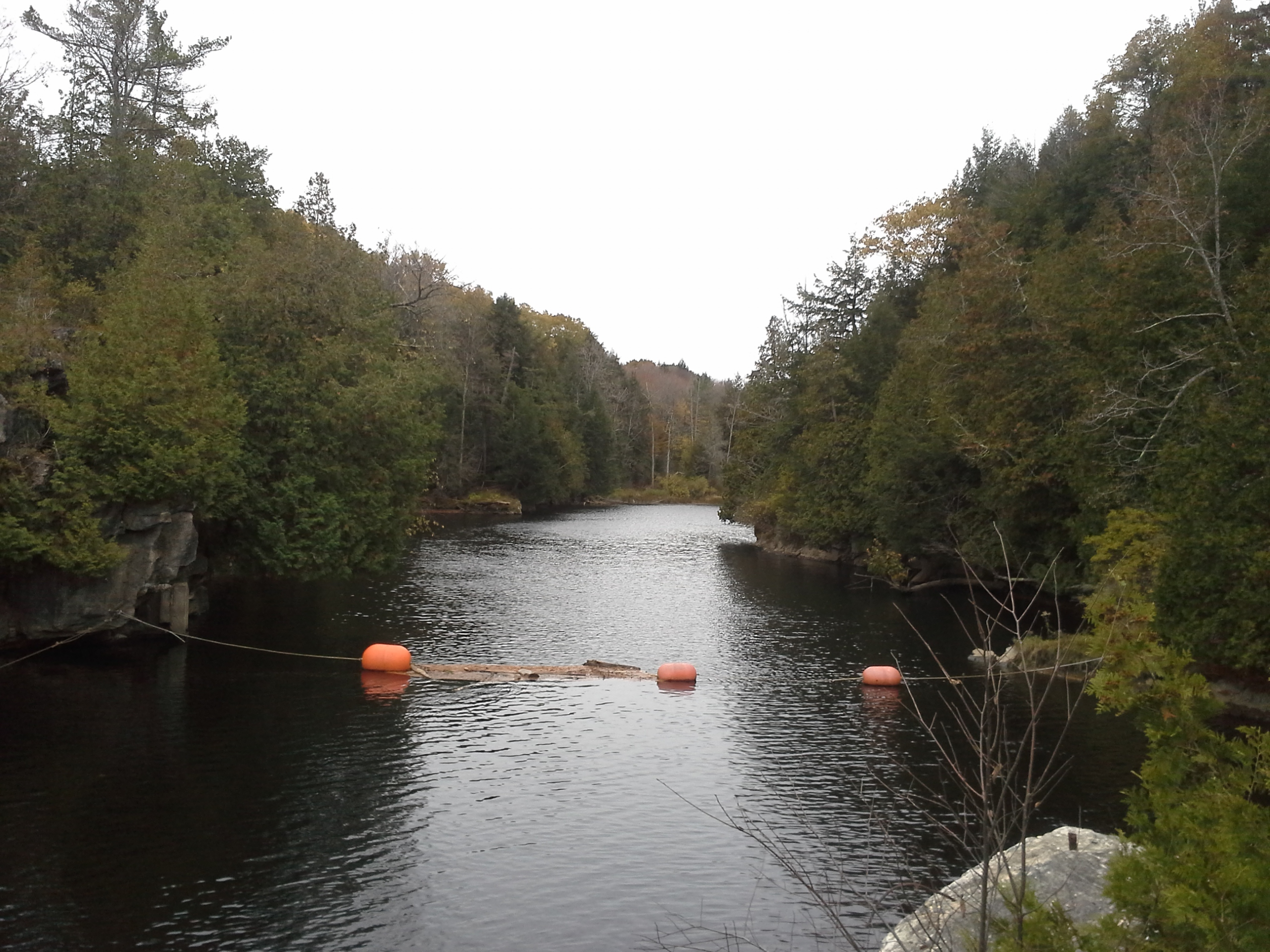
Otter Creek near Middlebury

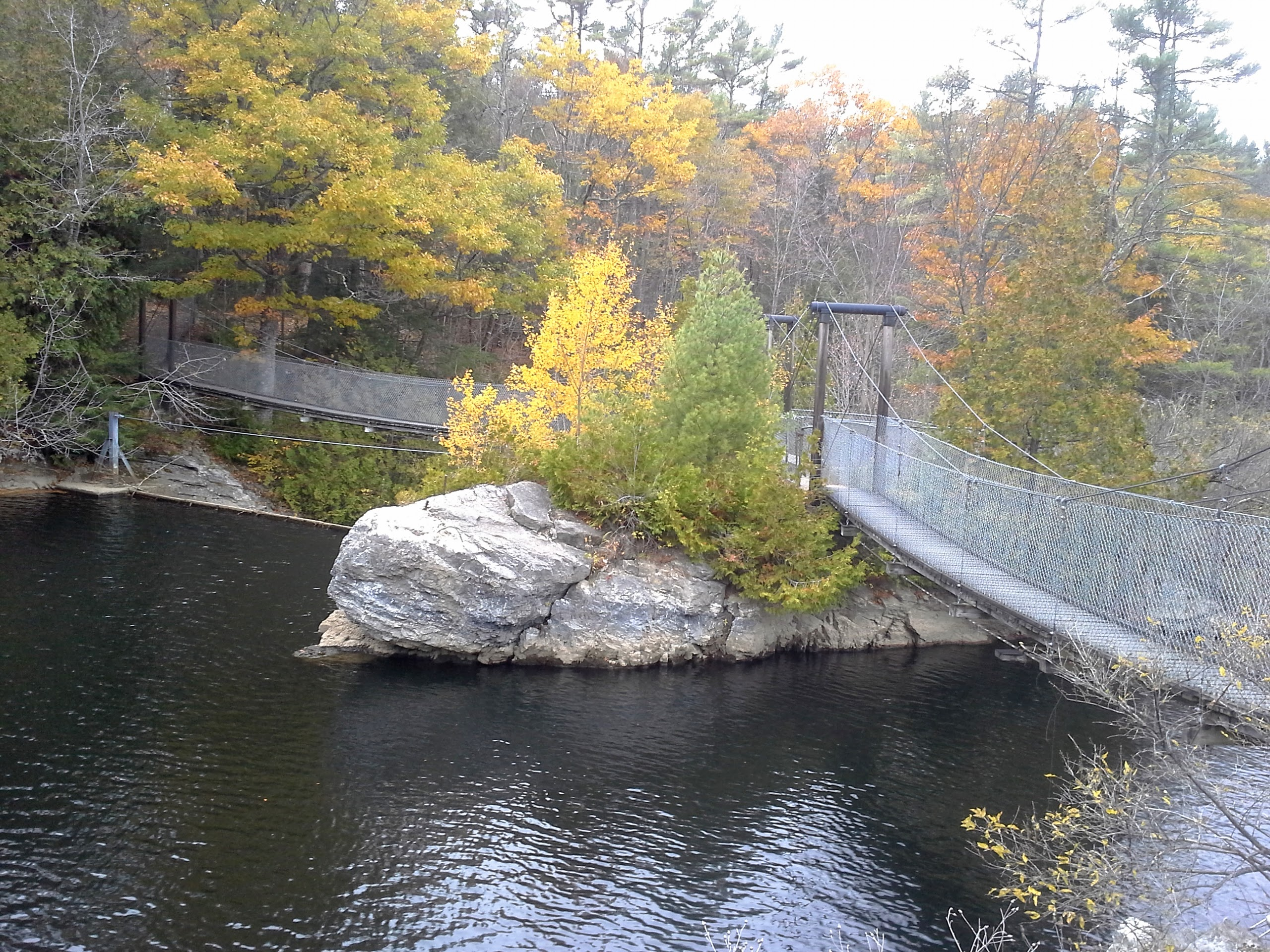
Belden Falls of Otter Creek, in Wright Park in Middlebury

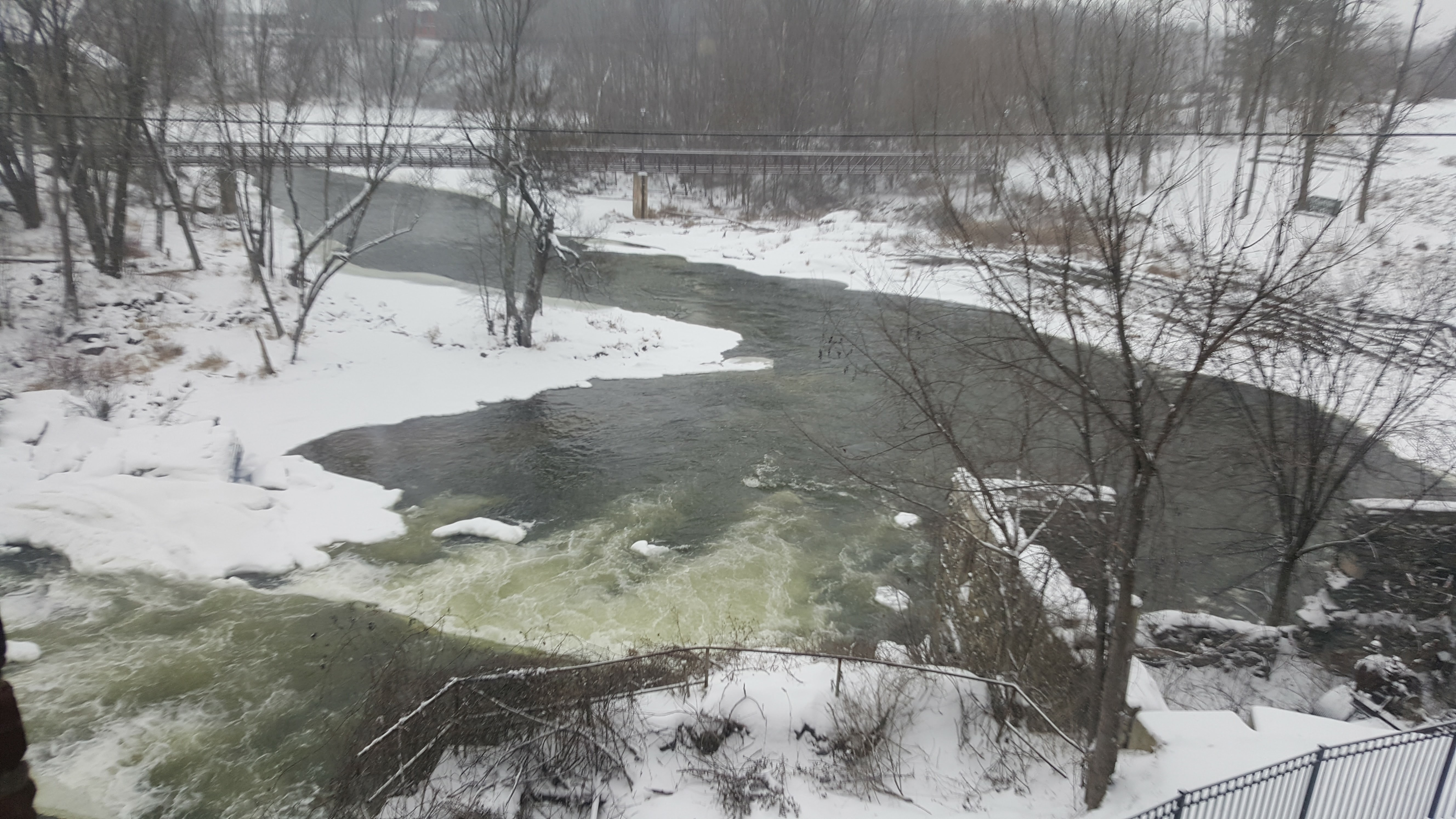
Otter Creek in Middlebury in the winter

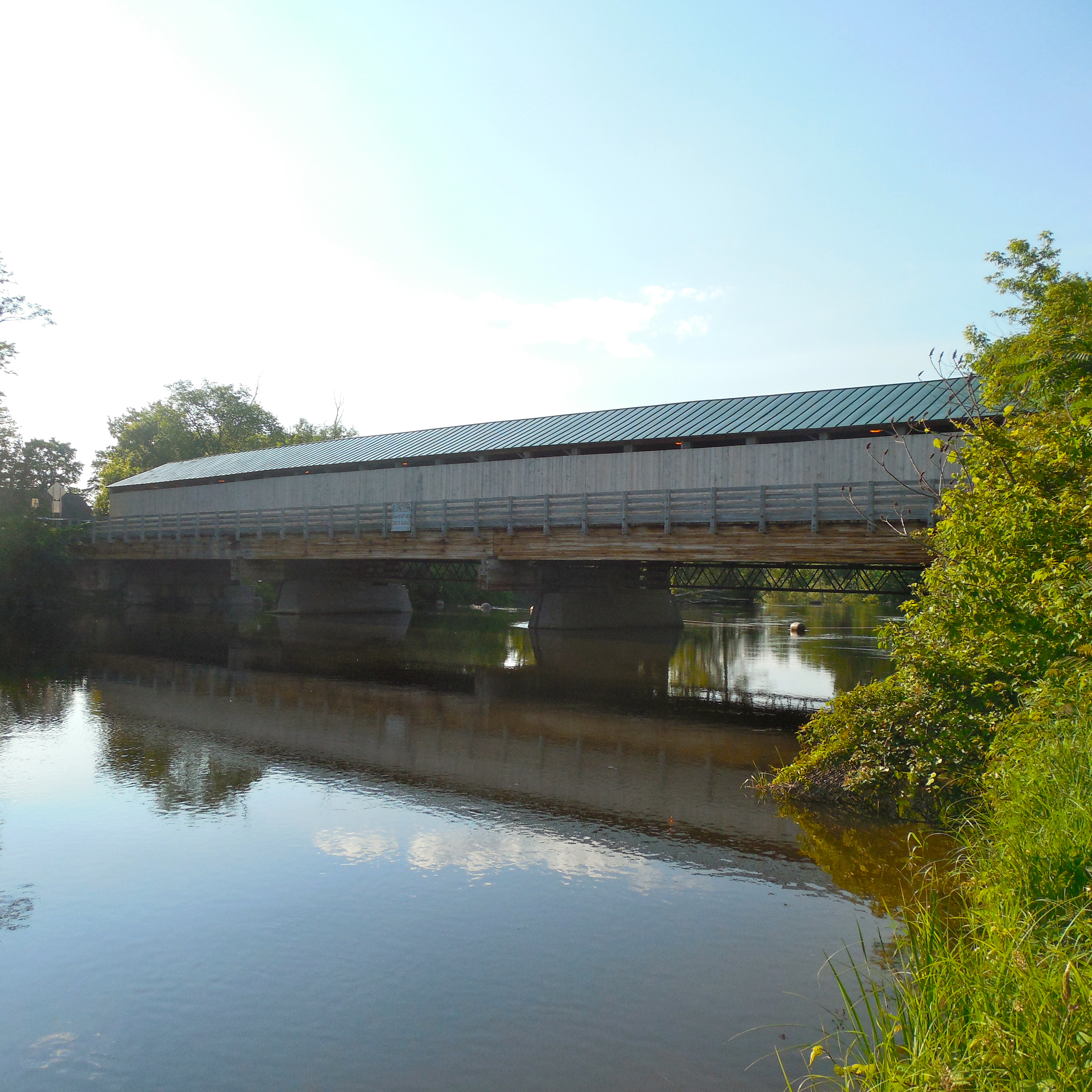
Pulp Mill Bridge over Otter Creek

== See also ==
- List of rivers of Vermont
- Otter Creek Brewing
