= U.S. Route 4 in Vermont =

Segment of American highway

U.S. Route 4
- Leonard F. Wing Blue Star Drive
- US 4 highlighted in red and US 4 Bus. highlighted in blue

Route information
- Maintained by VTrans
- Length: 66.059 mi (106.312 km)
- Existed: 1926–present

Major junctions
- West end: US 4 at the New York state line in Fair Haven
- VT 22A in Fair Haven; VT 30 in Castleton; US 7 in Rutland; VT 100 in Killington; I-89 in Hartford; I-91 / US 5 in White River Jct
- East end: US 4 at the New Hampshire state line in White River Jct

Location
- Country: United States
- State: Vermont
- Counties: Rutland, Windsor

Highway system
- United States Numbered Highway System; List; Special; Divided; State highways in Vermont
← VT 3	→ VT 4A
← Route 12A	N.E.	→ Route 14

U.S. Route 4 (US 4) in the U.S. state of Vermont extends for 66.059 miles (106.312 km) between the New York state line at Fair Haven and the New Hampshire state line at White River Junction. It is one of the main arteries between New York and New Hampshire.

== Route description ==
Upon crossing into Vermont from New York, US 4 immediately expands from a two-lane highway to a four-lane expressway. US 4 changes from being signed north–south (in New York) to being signed east–west (in Vermont). The historic routing of US 4 runs nearby as Vermont Route 4A (VT 4A), which later becomes US 4 Business (US 4 Bus.) as it enters the town of Rutland.

The 19-mile (31 km) US 4 expressway was built in anticipation of the proposed, but never built, East–West Highway which was supposed to link the population centers of northern New England. As such, this section of freeway meets Interstate Highway standards. The freeway has junctions with VT 22A in Fair Haven and VT 30 in Castleton. In West Rutland, the last numbered exit on the highway, exit 6, leads to US 4 Bus., which provides access to West Rutland and Center Rutland. The expressway veers south just outside of Rutland, ending at an at-grade intersection with US 7 south of the city.

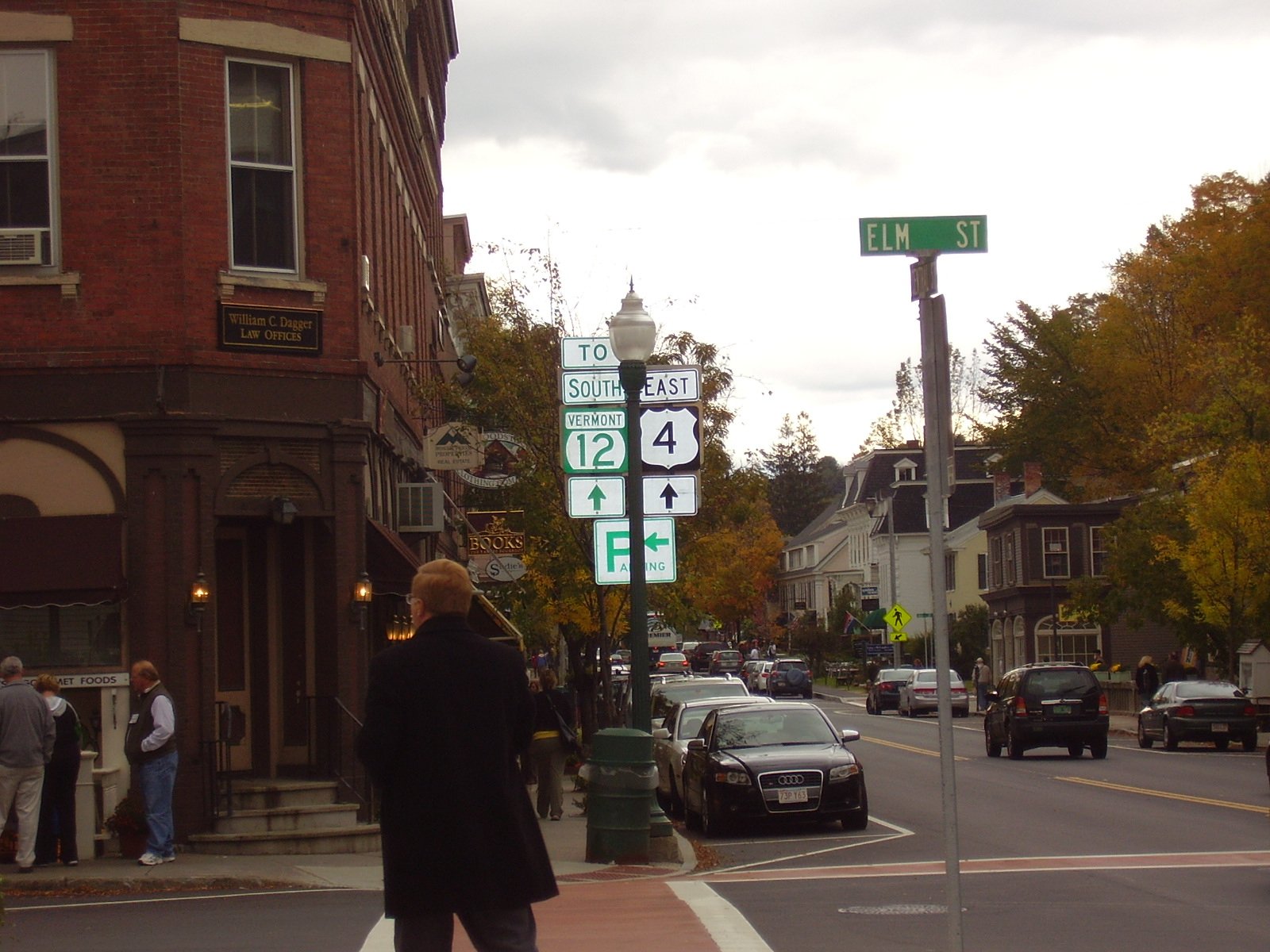
West junction with VT 12 in the center of Woodstock

US 4 overlaps with US 7 north into downtown Rutland, meeting the east end of its business route along the way. US 4 then leaves US 7 along Woodstock Avenue as it heads northeast out of the city. East of Rutland, US 4 is a two-lane highway, meandering through the Green Mountains and passing by the towns of Mendon and Killington. In Killington, US 4 joins VT 100 as they pass through Killington along the Ottauquechee River valley until reaching West Bridgewater. VT 100 splits off to the south while US 4 continues following the Ottauquechee River east through Bridgewater center into the town of Woodstock. Several miles later, US 4 enters the incorporated village of Woodstock, where it meets VT 12 and VT 106. Southbound VT 12 and eastbound US 4 overlap for about four miles (6.4 km) along the river and split in the Taftsville Historic District, in the northwest corner of the town of Hartland.

US 4 continues following the Ottauquechee River into Quechee, passing through the Quechee State Park and circling south of Deweys Pond to cross the river on the Quechee Gorge Bridge, before heading north to the south bank of the White River. Here, US 4 has an interchange with Interstate 89 (I-89), then turns eastward following the river bank into the village of White River Junction. In the village, US 4 joins US 5 as they cross the White River. At a four-way intersection immediately after the crossing, US 5 continues north, VT 14 begins to the west, and US 4 continues to the east. US 4 crosses the New Hampshire state line at the Connecticut River on the Lyman Bridge after a quarter of a mile (0.40 km).

== History ==

The road running from the New York state line (toward Whitehall, New York) at Fair Haven eastward through Rutland and Woodstock to White River Junction was designated as Route 13 of the New England road marking system in 1922. In late 1926, Route 13 was incorporated into the newly established U.S. Numbered Highway System as US 4. In the 1960s, construction of the 19-mile (31 km) expressway section of US 4 began. The middle segment of the expressway from exit 5 in Castleton to exit 6 in West Rutland opened to traffic in 1969. Two years later, the western segment from the New York line in Fair Haven to exit 5 also opened. The original surface alignment of US 4 was redesignated as VT 4A. The construction of the eastern segment (from exit 6 to the intersection with US 7) was delayed for several years and did not open to traffic until 1986. The original surface alignment east of exit 6 was redesignated as US 4 Bus.

== Future ==
There have been calls for construction of an east–west interstate freeway in New England.

Future Interstate 92
- Location: Albany, NY–Portsmouth, NH or Glens Falls, NY–Calais, ME

Northern New England is served by three north–south freeways radiating generally northwards from Boston, Massachusetts—from east to west, I-95, I-93, and US 3, all coming from or through Greater Boston; and westernmost of all, by I-91, which follows the Connecticut River. However, the northernmost complete east–west freeway existing within the region, I-90, does not enter northern New England. Continuous east–west freeway travel through (and within) northern New England is presently accomplished by three segments, only one of which is truly east–west.

There are a handful of alternate east–west roadways, including US 2 between Montpelier, Vermont, and Bangor, Maine; US 302 between Montpelier and Portland, US 4 from the New York–Vermont border to Portsmouth, New Hampshire; and VT 9/New Hampshire Route 9 between Bennington, Vermont, and the Concord, New Hampshire, area. These alternatives are mostly not limited access or designed for higher speed travel.

== Major intersections ==
County	Location	mi	km	Exit	Destinations	Notes
Rutland	Fair Haven	0.000	0.000		US 4 south – Whitehall	Continuation into New York
Rutland	Fair Haven	0.150	0.241	1	VT 4A (Prospect Street) – Vermont Welcome Center, Weigh Station	Exit 1 not signed eastbound, at-grade intersection with jughandle on westbound side, western terminus of VT 4A
Rutland	Fair Haven	1.676	2.697	2	VT 22A – Fair Haven, Vergennes	
Rutland	Fair Haven	2.573	4.141	3	To VT 4A – Fair Haven	Via Dutton Avenue; Westbound exit and eastbound entrance
Rutland	Castleton	5.449	8.769	5	VT 30 – Castleton, Middlebury	old exit 4
Rutland	Castleton	7.758	12.485	7	To VT 4A – Castleton	To Castleton State College; old exit 5
Rutland	West Rutland	14.899	23.978	14	US 4 Bus. east to VT 3 / VT 4A – West Rutland, Rutland Business District	Western terminus of US 4 Business, eastern terminus of VT 4A; old exit 6
Rutland	Town of Rutland	18.829	30.302		US 7 south – Manchester	Eastern end of freeway section; western end of concurrency with US 7
Rutland	City of Rutland	20.929	33.682		US 4 Bus. west	Eastern terminus of US 4 Business
Rutland	City of Rutland	21.066	33.902		US 7 north (North Main Street)	Eastern end of concurrency with US 7
Rutland	Killington	31.593	50.844		VT 100 north – Pittsfield, Waterbury	Western end of concurrency with VT 100
Windsor	West Bridgewater	38.030	61.203		VT 100 south – Plymouth Union, Ludlow	Eastern end of concurrency with VT 100
Windsor	Bridgewater	43.642	70.235		VT 100A south – Plymouth, Plymouth Union	Northern terminus of VT 100A
Windsor	Village of Woodstock	51.624	83.081		VT 106 south – South Woodstock, Springfield	Northern terminus of VT 106
Windsor	Village of Woodstock	51.755	83.292		VT 12 north (Pleasant Street) – Bethel	Western end of concurrency with VT 12
Windsor	Hartland	55.637	89.539		VT 12 south – Hartland, Windsor	Eastern end of concurrency with VT 12
Windsor	Hartford	62.417	100.450		I-89 to I-91 – Sharon, Barre	Exit 1 on I-89
Windsor	Hartford	65.261	105.027		US 5 south to I-89 / I-91 – Windsor	Western end of concurrency with US 5
Windsor	White River Junction	65.822	105.930		US 5 north to I-91 VT 14 north	Eastern end of concurrency with US 5; southern terminus of VT 14
Windsor	White River Junction	66.059	106.312		US 4 east	Continuation into New Hampshire at the Connecticut River
1.000 mi = 1.609 km; 1.000 km = 0.621 mi: Concurrency terminus; Incomplete access

== Special routes ==
- US 4 Alt.: Fair Haven to West Rutland
- US 4 Bus.: Rutland

U.S. Route 4
Previous state: New York	Vermont	Next state: New Hampshire
