= Bridgewater Woolen Mill =

- U.S. National Register of Historic Places
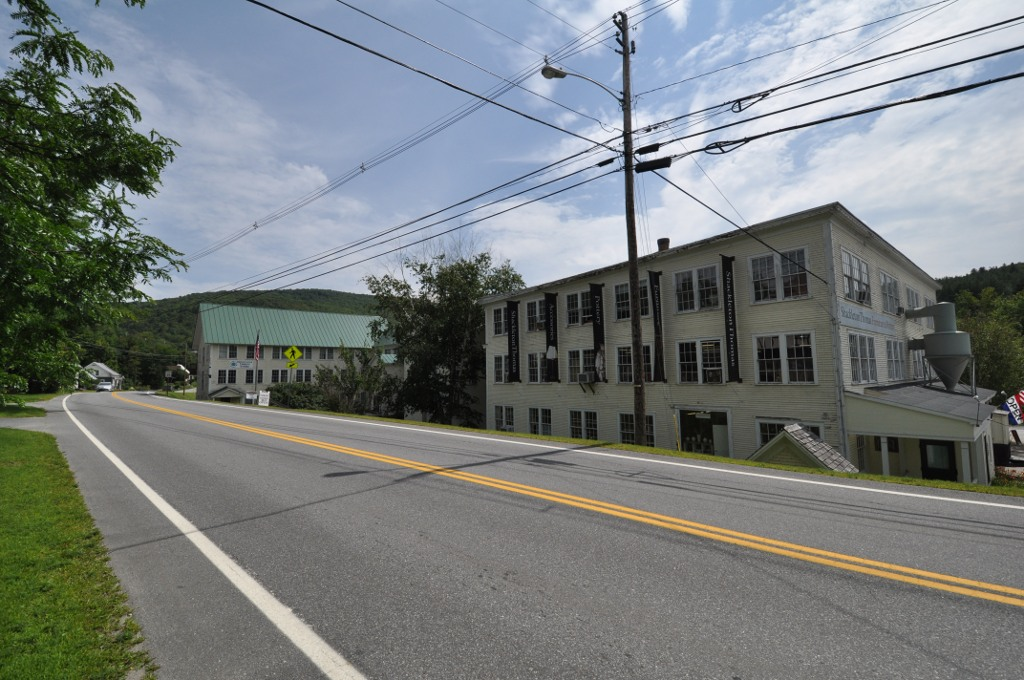

- Location within Vermont Location within the United States
- Location: U.S.4, Bridgewater and Woodstock, Vermont
- Coordinates: 43°35′13″N 72°37′16″W
- Area: 6.5 acres (2.6 ha)
- Built: 1828
- Architect: Southgate, Benjamin F.
- NRHP reference No.: 76002240
- Added to NRHP: July 6, 1976

The Bridgewater Woolen Mill, now more commonly the Bridgewater Mill Mall, is a historic textile mill complex on United States Route 4 in Bridgewater and Woodstock, Vermont. With a textile processing history dating from 1828 to 1975, it was one of the state's longest-lived textile operations, and was a mainstay of the local economy during that period. It has since been repurposed into a shopping center. It was listed on the National Register of Historic Places in 1976.

== Description and history ==
The Bridgewater Mill complex occupies more than 6 acres (2.4 ha) on the south side of US 4 near the center of Bridgewater village, which spills over into western Woodstock. It is set on a plateau of the flood plain of the Ottauquechee River, which flows easterly on the south side of the property, and served as the mill's original power source. The mill consists of nine connected buildings, most of wood and one of brick, and a tall free-standing brick chimney. The central portion of the mill is a three-story wood-frame building, with a gabled roof topped by a square cupola with Greek Revival pilasters at its corners.

The history of industrial use of this site begins in 1786, when Richard and Isaac Southgate dammed the river and built a sawmill and gristmill. In 1825, Benjamin Southgate, grandson of Richard, built a new dam, and in 1828 built a textile mill. It is unclear whether any of the surviving buildings are from this early period, as there was a fire in 1852 that did substantial damage, suggesting the surviving main building was built in 1853. The mill was a major employer in the town, employing 150 people in a town of 800. In 1909, the mill owners added a hydroelectric generation facility to the dam, providing power for the mill and village homes and businesses. The mill failed due to the Great Depression in the 1930s, but reopened in 1940 after reorganizing. It finally closed its doors in 1975. The property was acquired by a local citizens' group, which transformed the mill into the shopping complex it is today.

== See also ==
- National Register of Historic Places listings in Windsor County, Vermont
