= Quechee Gorge Bridge =

- U.S. National Register of Historic Places
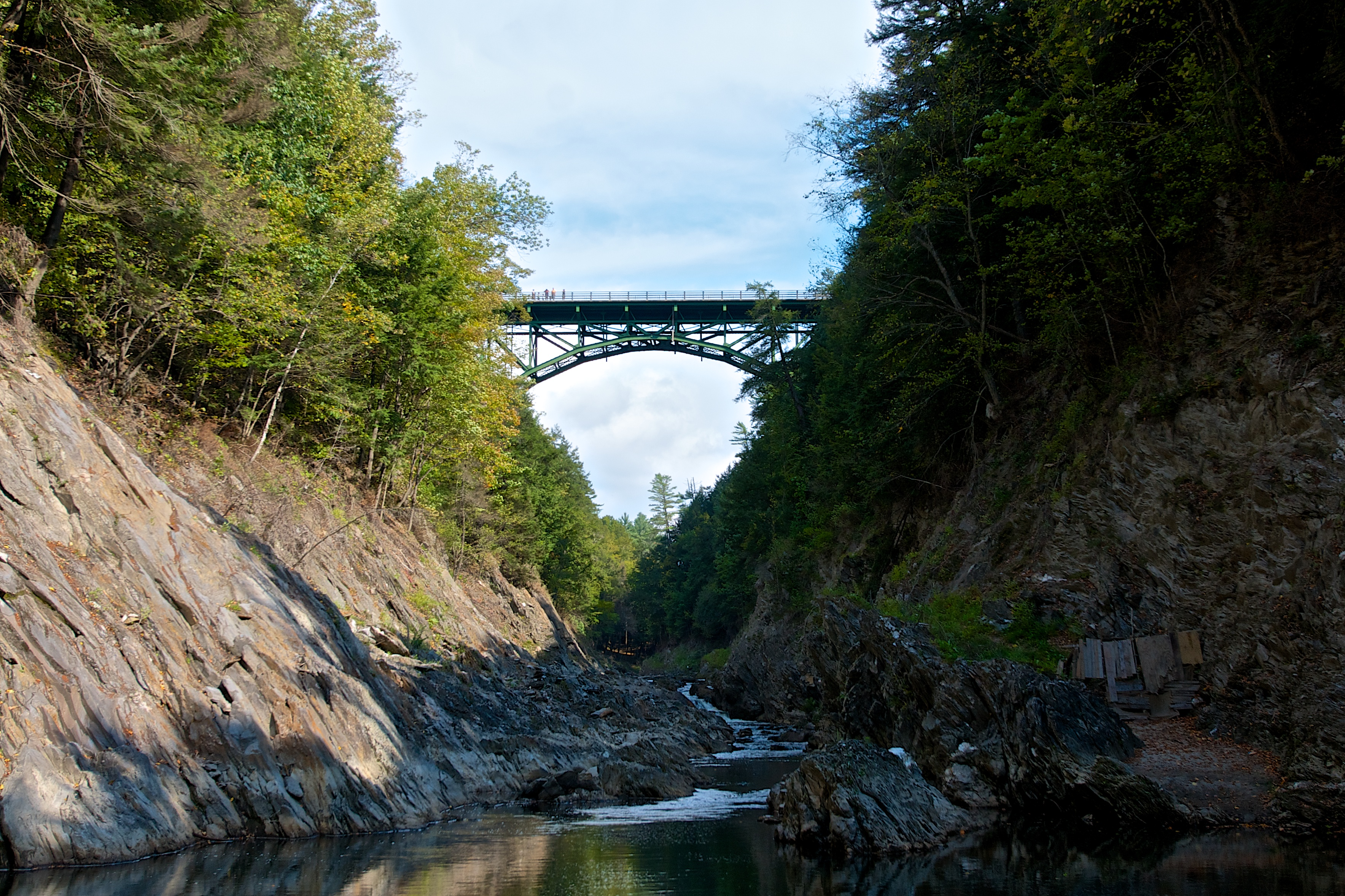

- Location within Vermont
- Location: US 4 over Quechee Gorge, Hartford, Vermont
- Coordinates: 43°38′16″N 72°24′32″W
- Area: less than one acre
- Built: 1911
- Built by: American Bridge Co.; Storrs, John W.
- Architectural style: Metal deck truss bridge
- MPS: Metal Truss, Masonry, and Concrete Bridges in Vermont MPS
- NRHP reference No.: 90001490
- Added to NRHP: October 11, 1990

The Quechee Gorge Bridge is a historic bridge, carrying U.S. Route 4 (US 4) across Quechee Gorge, near the Quechee village of Hartford, Vermont. Built in 1911, it is Vermont's oldest surviving steel arch bridge. It was listed on the National Register of Historic Places in 1990.

== Description and history ==
The Quechee Gorge Bridge is located on US 4, roughly midway between Woodstock and White River Junction, Vermont. It is set high above the Ottauquechee River near the southern end of Quechee Gorge, a major local tourist attraction that is part of Quechee State Park. It is a three-span steel deck truss structure, 285 feet (87 m) long, 41 feet (12 m) wide, and 163 feet (50 m) high carrying two lanes of traffic (one in each direction) and sidewalks on both sides. Its main span is a parabolic spandrel-braced Pratt truss, forming a span of 188 feet (57 m). The arch is mounted on concrete footings, which are located near the stone abutments of the previous bridge. The bridge structure is built out of a series of panels and other steel elements, joined by rivets, and its deck consists of I-beam stringers covered by a concrete base.

The bridge was built in 1911, its trusses built by the American Bridge Company to a design by John W. Storrs, a prolific local bridge engineer. It was originally built as a railroad bridge, and was in 1933 adapted for use as a highway bridge; it is from that period that its current deck dates. It was probably built by cantilevering the arch ends over the gorge, braced by stay cables until the ends were joined. It is Vermont's oldest surviving steel arch bridge, and the only one that is spandrel-braced.

== See also ==
- National Register of Historic Places listings in Windsor County, Vermont
- List of bridges on the National Register of Historic Places in Vermont
