= Vermont Route 3 =

State highway in Rutland County, Vermont, US

Vermont Route 3
- Marble Valley Highway
- VT 3 highlighted in red

Route information
- Maintained by VTrans
- Length: 7.828 mi (12.598 km)

Major junctions
- South end: US 4 Bus. in Rutland
- North end: US 7 in Pittsford

Location
- Country: United States
- State: Vermont
- Counties: Rutland

Highway system
- State highways in Vermont
← US 2	→ US 4

Vermont Route 3 (VT 3) is a 7.828-mile-long (12.598 km) north–south state highway in Rutland County, Vermont, United States. It runs from the town of Rutland to Pittsford.

== Route description ==
VT 3 begins at an intersection with U.S. Route 4 Business in the Rutland community of Rutland Center. The route heads north, paralleling U.S. Route 7 (located 3 miles (5 km) to the east) north into Proctor, where it goes past the site of the Vermont Marble Museum. In the center of the community of Proctor, VT 3 turns to the northeast, crossing into Pittsford and gradually becoming closer to US 7 before terminating at the route southeast of the community of Pittsford.

== Major intersections ==
The entire route is in Rutland County.

Location	mi	km	Destinations	Notes
Town of Rutland	0.000	0.000	US 4 Bus. – Rutland, West Rutland	Southern terminus; to US 4 and VT 4A
Pittsford	7.828	12.598	US 7 – Pittsford, Brandon, Rutland	Northern terminus
1.000 mi = 1.609 km; 1.000 km = 0.621 mi
