= West Rutland (CDP), Vermont =

Census-designated place in Vermont, United States

West Rutland, Vermont
- Census-designated place
- Location within Vermont Location within the United States
- Coordinates: 43°35′35″N 73°2′44″W
- Country: United States
- State: Vermont
- County: Rutland
- Town: West Rutland

Area
  - Total: 3.69 sq mi (9.57 km^{2})
  - Land: 3.68 sq mi (9.52 km^{2})
  - Water: 0.019 sq mi (0.05 km^{2})
- Elevation: 498 ft (152 m)

Population (2020)
  - Total: 1,898
- Time zone: UTC-5 (Eastern (EST))
  - Summer (DST): UTC-4 (EDT)
- ZIP Code: 05777
- Area code: 802
- FIPS code: 50-82375
- GNIS feature ID: 2378138

West Rutland is the central village and a census-designated place (CDP) in the town of West Rutland, Rutland County, Vermont, United States. As of the 2020 census, it had a population of 1,898, out of 2,214 in the entire town of West Rutland.

== Geography ==
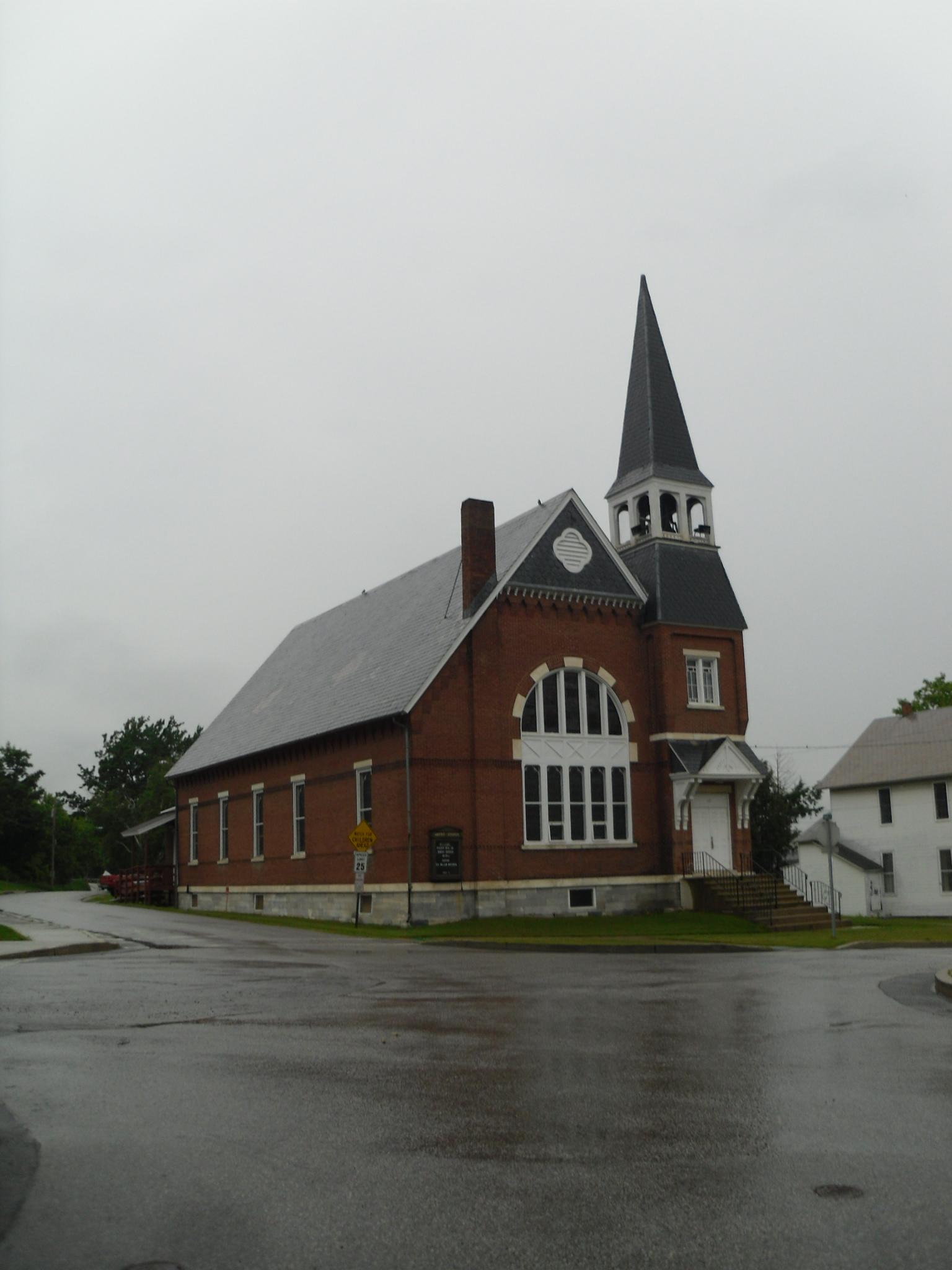
Church in West Rutland

The CDP is in central Rutland County, in the southern part of the town. It sits in a valley on the east side of the Taconic Mountains, drained to the east by the Clarendon River, a tributary of Otter Creek, and to the west by the Castleton River, a tributary of the Poultney River. Both sets of rivers eventually flow to Lake Champlain.

U.S. Route 4, a four-lane expressway, passes south of the village center, with access from Exit 6. Route 4 leads east 4 miles (6 km) to U.S. Route 7 on the south side of Rutland and west 13 miles (21 km) to Fair Haven. Vermont Route 4A, former US 4, is Main Street through West Rutland; it leads east 4 miles (6 km) to downtown Rutland and west 7 miles (11 km) to Castleton. Vermont Route 133 (Clarendon Avenue) leads south from the center of West Rutland 11 miles (18 km) to Middletown Springs.
