= Vermont Route 144 =

State highway in Rutland County, Vermont, US

Vermont Route 144
- Benson Road, Lake Hortonia Road
- Map of Rutland County in western Vermont with VT 144 highlighted in red

Route information
- Maintained by the Towns of Benson, Hubbardton, and Sudbury
- Length: 6.91 mi (11.12 km)

Major junctions
- West end: VT 22A in Benson
- East end: VT 30 in Sudbury

Location
- Country: United States
- State: Vermont
- Counties: Rutland

Highway system
- State highways in Vermont
← VT 143	→ VT 147

Vermont Route 144 (VT 144) is a 6.91-mile-long (11.12 km) east–west state highway in Rutland County, Vermont, United States. It extends from VT 22A in Benson to VT 30 in Sudbury. VT 144 also passes through the extreme northwestern corner of Hubbardton. All of VT 144 is town-maintained.

== Route description ==
Route 144 begins in the west at an intersection with Route 22A, east of Benson. The route follows a generally east-northeast track as it heads out of Benson, crossing into Sudbury and ending at an intersection with Route 30 south of town. Route 144 runs through an isolated area, intersecting one relatively major local road, Hortonia Road, along its length, but not intersecting any numbered routes between its endpoints. The road passes by Lake Hortonia just before ending at its eastern terminus.

== Major intersections ==
The entire route is in Rutland County.

Location	mi	km	Destinations	Notes
Benson	0.00	0.00	VT 22A – Fair Haven, Vergennes	Western terminus
Sudbury	6.91	11.12	VT 30 – Sudbury, Castleton Corners	Eastern terminus
1.000 mi = 1.609 km; 1.000 km = 0.621 mi
