= Snake Mountain (Vermont) =

Mountain in Vermont, United States

- Grand View Mountain
- Snake Mountain ridgeline

Highest point
- Elevation: 1,287 ft (392 m) NGVD 29
- Prominence: 993 ft (303 m)
- Listing: Mountains of Vermont
- Coordinates: 44°03′41″N 73°16′49″W

Geography
- Location within Vermont
- Country: United States
- State: Vermont
- County: Addison
- Town: Addison / Weybridge
- Parent range: Taconic Mountains
- Topo map: USGS Port Henry

Geology
- Rock age(s): Taconic orogeny, 440 million years
- Mountain type: thrust fault

Snake Mountain, also called Grand View Mountain, is an isolated mountain in the U.S. state of Vermont. The mountain straddles the Addison-Weybridge town line in Addison County. Most of the mountain, including the summit, is part of the 1,215-acre (492 ha) Snake Mountain Wildlife Management Area (WMA) administered by the Vermont Fish & Wildlife Department. Adjacent to the WMA is the 81-acre (33 ha) Wilmarth Woods Natural Area protected by The Nature Conservancy.

Snake Mountain is one of a series of scattered hills extending into the Champlain Valley from the greater Taconic Mountains along Vermont's southwestern edge. Seen from the west, the prominent sheer cliffs of the mountain rise dramatically out of the valley making it easy to distinguish from other nearby hills and mountains. From the summit, there is an open vista of Lake Champlain and the Adirondack Mountains to the west. The view from the summit is sometimes called "Grand View.”

== History ==
Over 400 million years ago, the Champlain thrust fault placed a 550 million-year-old slice of rust-red quartzite on top of gray shale in central Addison County. From this, hundreds of millions of years of erosion carved out the landform we now know as Snake Mountain. Around 13,000 years ago, the mountain stood as a small island in the deep waters of glacial Lake Vermont, the geological predecessor of Lake Champlain. Eventually the waters receded, exposing Snake Mountain and other hills along the thrust fault in the Champlain Valley.

The mountain was once the site of the Grand View Hotel, which was built around 1870 by Jonas N. Smith. Smith also built an observation tower and a carriage road to the summit. He thought the name Snake Mountain would discourage people from visiting his hotel, so he changed the name to Grand View Mountain. The hotel, which opened in 1874, became a popular destination for summer outings.

The hotel closed in 1925. The carriage road was washed away in the flood of 1927 and the tower was destroyed by the hurricane of 1938. The hotel itself eventually burned. The state of Vermont acquired the summit land in 1988.

Today the old carriage road is a popular hiking trail. Contrary to popular belief, the concrete pad on the summit overlook is not that of the hotel but rather the foundation of a house that a young man started to build on the summit before he died overseas in a car crash.

== Trails ==
Several hiking trails criss-cross the mountain. The primary trailhead is on the west side of the mountain at the junction of Wilmarth Road and Mountain Road in the town of Addison. From there a 1.8-mile (2.9 km) trail passes through Wilmarth Woods and follows the old carriage road to the summit. An alternative path traverses the ridge of the mountain just west of the carriage road but the ridge trail may be closed from March 15 to August 1 to protect nesting peregrine falcons. These two paths form a 4.1-mile (6.6 km) loop trail to the summit and back. A second loop trail combines the carriage road with a trail through the Snake Mountain Wildlife Management Area that cuts across the eastern slope of the mountain.

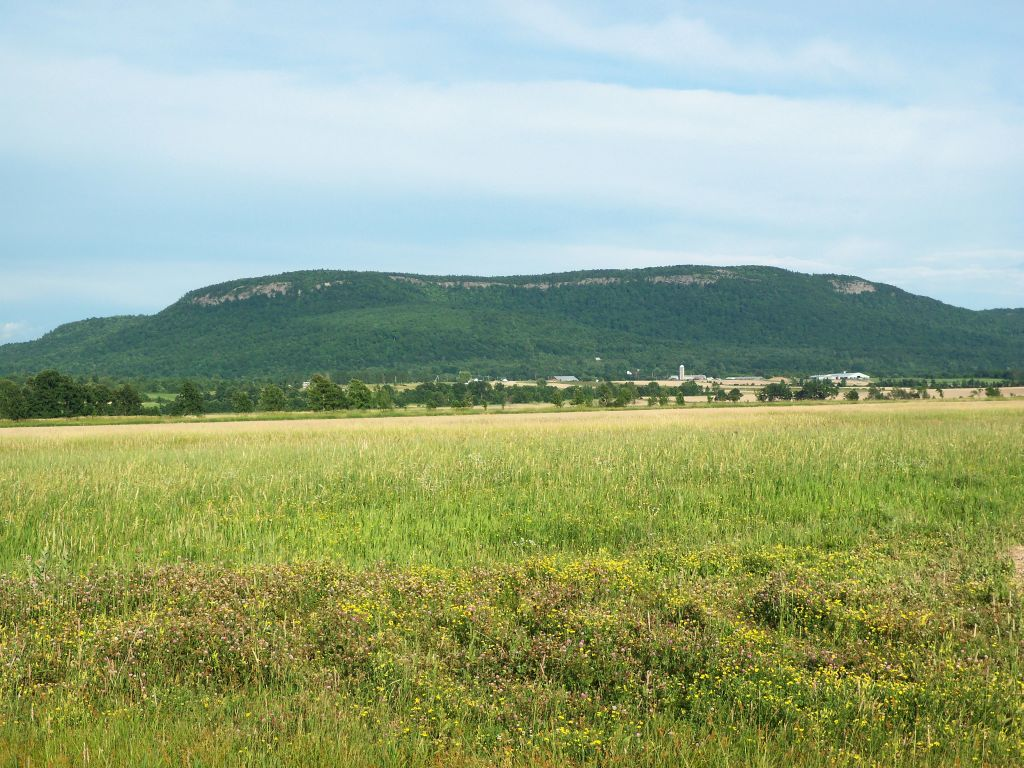
The west side of Snake Mountain from Vermont Route 17

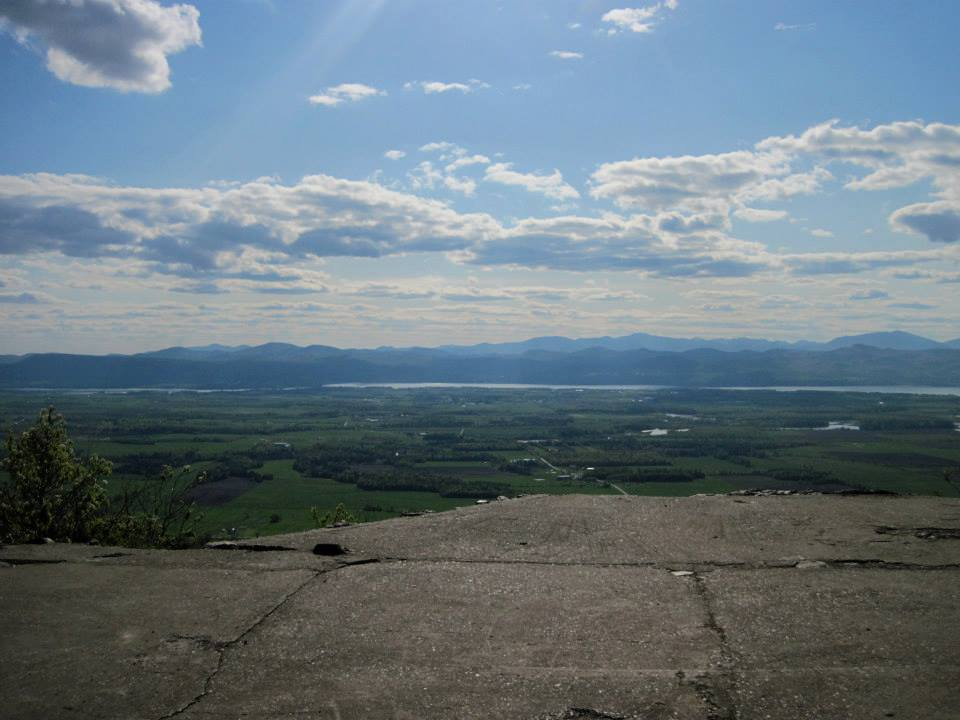
Lake Champlain and the Adirondacks from the summit of Snake Mountain

A full panorama of Snake Mountain
