= Addison Baptist Church =

Historic church in Vermont, United States

- U.S. National Register of Historic Places
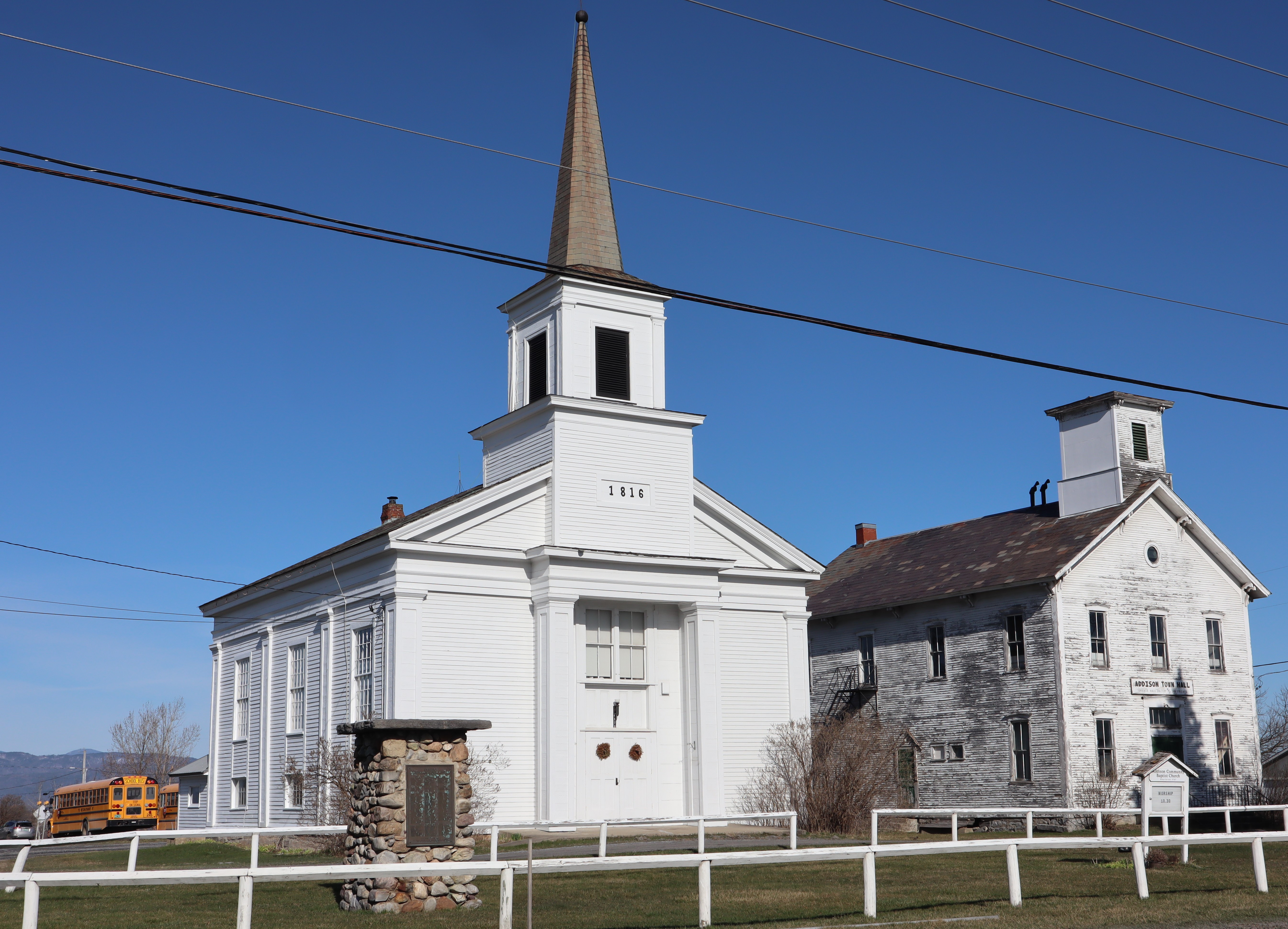
- Addison Baptist Church with the Town Hall to the right

- Location within Vermont Location within the United States
- Location: 4970 VT 22A, Addison, Vermont
- Coordinates: 44°5′18.21″N 73°18′10.71″W
- Built: 1816
- Architectural style: Greek Revival
- NRHP reference No.: 78003202
- Added to NRHP: November 2, 1978

The Addison Community Baptist Church is a historic church building at 4970 Vermont Route 22A in the village center of Addison, Vermont. Built in 1816 and restyled in 1849, it is one of Vermont's oldest Baptist churches, and a good local example of Greek Revival architecture. It was listed on the National Register of Historic Places in 1978 as Addison Baptist Church.

== Description and history ==
The Addison Community Baptist Church stands just south of Addison Town Hall, on the west side of Vermont Route 22A just south of its junction with Vermont Route 17. It is a single-story wood-frame structure, with a gabled roof and clapboarded exterior. It is three bays wide and three deep, the bays of the front and sides articulated by pilasters. An entablature encircles the building below the roof line, and a square tower rises through the front of the roof. It has a plain first stage in which the front facade includes a panel with the building's construction date. It is topped by an entablature and cornice, above which the smaller belfry stage rises. It is also square, with pilastered corners, entablature and louvered openings. An octagonal steeple rises above the belfry, terminating in a spire. The front facade is relatively plain, with unwindowed side bays flanking a projecting central bay. The main entrance is recessed in that bay, where a pair of sash windows are mounted above the doorway. The interior retains original box pews. Federal style columns that originally supported the gallery are now used as supports in the basement, where the vestry is located.

Addison's Baptist congregation was organized in 1797, and organized the construction of this building in 1816. In 1849 the building underwent a major restyling, at which time its Greek Revival features were added. Alterations since then have been limited: the building has been fitted with electricity and modern plumbing, and an ell was added to the rear in 1962.

== See also ==
- National Register of Historic Places listings in Addison County, Vermont
