= Middletown Springs, Vermont =

- Town
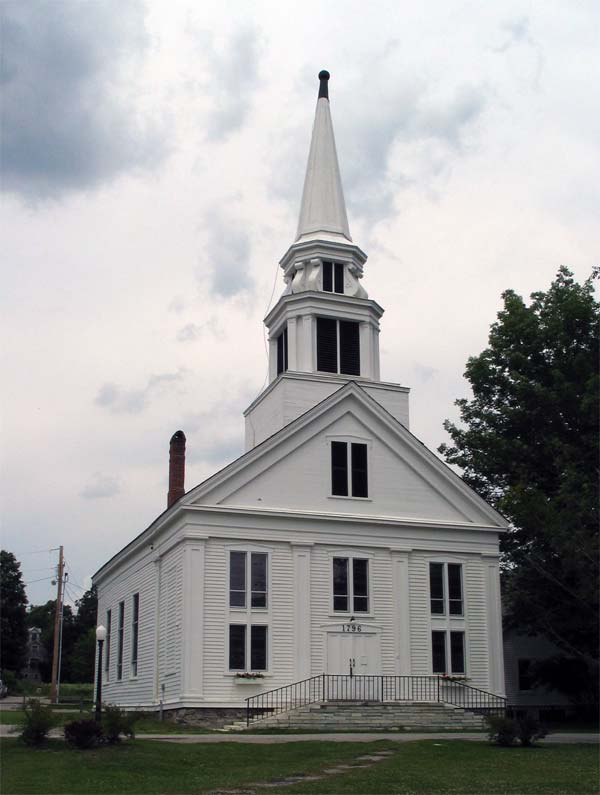
- Middletown Springs Community Church

- Seal

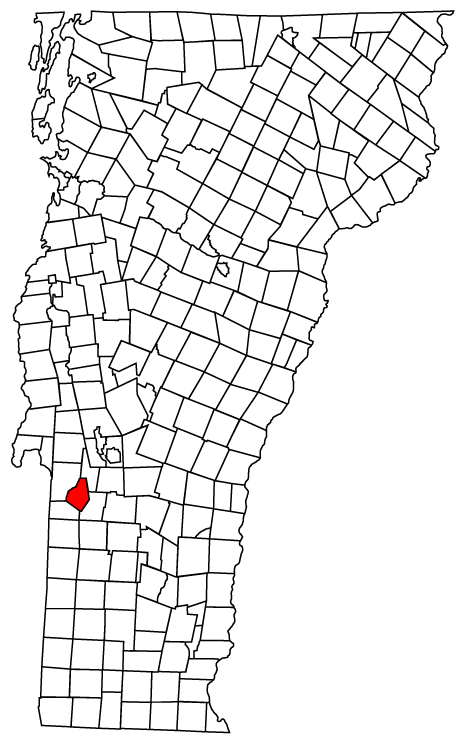
- Middletown Springs, Vermont
- Coordinates: 43°30′42″N 73°07′36″W
- Country: United States
- State: Vermont
- County: Rutland
- Established: 1784
- Communities: Middletown Springs; Burnham Hollow

Area
  - Total: 22.9 sq mi (59.2 km^{2})
  - Land: 22.9 sq mi (59.2 km^{2})
  - Water: 0 sq mi (0.0 km^{2})
- Elevation: 873 ft (266 m)

Population (2020)
  - Total: 794
  - Density: 34.7/sq mi (13.4/km^{2})
- Time zone: UTC-5 (Eastern (EST))
  - Summer (DST): UTC-4 (EDT)
- ZIP code: 05757
- Area code: 802
- FIPS code: 50-44800
- GNIS feature ID: 1462148
- Website: middletownsprings.vt.gov

Middletown Springs is a town in Rutland County, Vermont, United States. The population was 794 at the 2020 census.

== Geography ==
According to the United States Census Bureau, the town has a total area of 22.9 square miles (59.2 km^{2}), all land. The unincorporated village of Middletown Springs is at the center of the town.

== History ==
Settlement began shortly before the American Revolutionary War. At that time, the four towns of Ira, Poultney, Wells, and Tinmouth converged within a fertile valley ringed by mountains. Inhabitants of this valley had difficulty crossing the mountains to attend church and conduct business in their respective towns, and resolved in 1784 to petition the legislature to create a new town. The petition was granted, and the honor of naming the town was given to settler Joseph Spaulding because of his service in surveying the town's borders. He chose "Middletown" as result of its location at the middle of four towns and to pay homage to his hometown of Middletown, Connecticut. By the year 1810, the population had reached its all-time high of 1,207 persons, and the town was marked by a character of industriousness and prosperity. Middletown had become "a central place" within Rutland County, with many citizens of nearby communities traveling to patronize the businesses in town which included numerous grist and saw mills, forges, distilleries, tanneries, and clothiers works, as well as mechanics' shops, taverns, and general stores. An incredibly severe flood which occurred during the summer of 1811 damaged or completely swept away nearly all of the mills and industries, a blow from which the town never truly recovered.

The town's name was officially changed to "Middletown Springs" in 1885, which was a reference to the town's mineral springs that drew in large numbers of visitors in the late 19th century.

== Demographics ==
Historical population
Census	Pop.	Note	%±
1790	699		—
1800	1,066		52.5%
1810	1,207		13.2%
1820	1,039		−13.9%
1830	919		−11.5%
1840	1,057		15.0%
1850	875		−17.2%
1860	712		−18.6%
1870	777		9.1%
1880	823		5.9%
1890	786		−4.5%
1900	746		−5.1%
1910	716		−4.0%
1920	567		−20.8%
1930	583		2.8%
1940	493		−15.4%
1950	496		0.6%
1960	381		−23.2%
1970	426		11.8%
1980	603		41.5%
1990	686		13.8%
2000	823		20.0%
2010	745		−9.5%
2020	794		6.6%
U.S. Decennial Census

As of the census of 2000, there were 823 people, 331 households, and 237 families residing in the town. The population density was 36.0 people per square mile (13.9/km^{2}). There were 397 housing units at an average density of 17.4 per square mile (6.7/km^{2}). The racial makeup of the town was 97.81% White, 0.49% African American, 0.49% Native American, 0.36% Asian, 0.24% from other races, and 0.61% from two or more races. Hispanic or Latino of any race were 0.49% of the population.

There were 331 households, out of which 31.4% had children under the age of 18 living with them, 61.0% were married couples living together, 7.9% had a female householder with no husband present, and 28.1% were non-families. 22.7% of all households were made up of individuals, and 8.8% had someone living alone who was 65 years of age or older. The average household size was 2.49 and the average family size was 2.92.

In the town, the population was spread out, with 24.9% under the age of 18, 5.3% from 18 to 24, 28.3% from 25 to 44, 29.2% from 45 to 64, and 12.3% who were 65 years of age or older. The median age was 41 years. For every 100 females, there were 91.8 males. For every 100 females age 18 and over, there were 91.9 males.

The median income for a household in the town was $35,385, and the median income for a family was $43,750. Males had a median income of $33,214 versus $25,114 for females. The per capita income for the town was $18,914. About 10.0% of families and 11.8% of the population were below the poverty line, including 19.0% of those under age 18 and 2.0% of those age 65 or over.

== Parks and recreation ==
The Middletown Springs Historical Society owns the site of the springs that the town is named after, which is now a park open to the public known as Mineral Springs Park. Visitors can see the original marble enclosures containing the springs, a recreation of the Victorian spring house, learn about town history, and enjoy natural beauty along the Poultney River.

== Notable people ==
- Frank Asch (1946-2022), children's book writer
- Walter W. Granger (1872–1941), noted paleontologist
