= Vermont Route 143 =

State highway in Windsor County, Vermont, US

Vermont Route 143
- Map of Windsor County in eastern Vermont with VT 143 highlighted in red

Route information
- Maintained by the Town of Springfield
- Length: 5.75 mi (9.25 km)
- Existed: May 1961–present

Major junctions
- West end: VT 11 in Springfield
- East end: US 5 in Springfield

Location
- Country: United States
- State: Vermont
- Counties: Windsor

Highway system
- State highways in Vermont
← VT 142	→ VT 144

Vermont Route 143 (VT 143) is a 5.75-mile-long (9.25 km) state highway within the town of Springfield in Windsor County, Vermont, United States. It connects VT 11 in Springfield to U.S. Route 5 (US 5) in Springfield. The entirety of VT 143 is maintained by the town of Springfield.

== Route description ==
Route 143 begins in the west at an intersection with Route 11 in the center of town, just east of Route 106's southern terminus. The route heads eastward out of the town, and begins a windy journey, turning north, then east, then back to the north, and then to the northeast towards Interstate 91. Route 143 crosses underneath I-91 without an interchange, and continues to turn ever more northward until it reaches US-5, at which point the route is facing almost directly north–south.

This intersection is Route 143's eastern terminus, just feet from the banks of the Connecticut River and the state border with New Hampshire. This is an isolated area, however, and the nearest border crossings are nearly 5 miles (8.0 km) in each direction: Route 11 crosses the border to the south, southeast of Springfield, and Route 12 crosses the border to the north from Ascutney. These two routes, the closest major roads (aside from US-5) accessible from Route 143's eastern end, also provide the closest access to I-91, at exit 7 in the south and exit 8 in the north.

== Major intersections ==
The entire route is in Springfield, Windsor County.

mi	km	Destinations	Notes
0.00	0.00	VT 11 to I-91	Western terminus
5.75	9.25	US 5 – Windsor, Claremont NH, White River Junction	Eastern terminus
1.000 mi = 1.609 km; 1.000 km = 0.621 mi
