= Long Trail Brewing Company =

Brewery in the United States

Coordinates: 43.5884226°N 72.6595934°W

- Company type: Private
- Industry: Alcoholic beverage
- Founded: 1989
- Headquarters: Bridgewater Corners, Vermont, U.S.
- Products: Beer
- Owner: Harpoon Brewery
- Website: longtrail.com

Long Trail Brewing Company is a regional brewery in Bridgewater Corners, Vermont, United States. Founded in 1989 by Andy Pherson in the basement of the Bridgewater Woolen Mill, the company relocated to its current brewing facility and visitor center in 1995. Originally known as Mountain Brewers, the company changed its name to Long Trail Brewing Company shortly after their relocation to Bridgewater Corners, Vermont. In 2006, Long Trail was acquired by Fulham and Co., a Massachusetts-based private equity firm. Located on the banks of the Ottaquechee River in the heart of the Green Mountains, the Long Trail campus includes its brewing operations, visitor center, farmhouse pilot brewery and wastewater treatment facility.

Long Trail Ale, a German Altbier, is the company's flagship beer. It is the largest selling craft-brew in Vermont.

In June 2022 it was acquired by Harpoon Brewery.

== Beers ==
Long Trail makes a number of different styles of beer, mostly English-style top-fermented ales, but its flagship beer is Long Trail Ale, a Düsseldorf-style altbier. It also participates in the tradition of brewing a "Sticke" Alt (from a dialect German word for secret) known as Long Trail Double Bag, though unlike the German originators of the style, Long Trail makes Double Bag available year-round. During the 1990s it also brewed a Kölsch-style ale as a spring seasonal.

In the summer of 2006 Long Trail added a hefeweizen to its list of brews. Originally Long Trail's summer seasonal brew, Blackbeary Wheat became a year-round beer in the Fall of 2007. In 2013, the Farmhouse Pilot Brewery introduced the Limbo IPA, which became the first year-round brew produced by the Pilot project.

=== Brown Bag Series ===
The Brown Bag concept was developed in 1993 as a way for Long Trail to develop new recipes quickly without the added expense of graphic design and packaging. These small batch brews developed into Long Trail favorites like Double Bag, a year-round Strong Ale and Hit the Trail Ale, a limited release English Brown Ale.

Although discontinued in the early 1990s, the Brown Bag Series was revived in October 2012 as a small-batch, limited release series that pays homage to the original Brown Bag concept. Thanks to a small-batch pilot brewing facility on Long Trail's campus, brewers can experiment with recipes on a small scale. The draught is available at the brewery and other establishments throughout the East. Current and past Brown Bag releases include an American IPA, Belgian Smoked Porter, Milk Stout and Maple Maibock (fermented with maple syrup).

== Distribution ==
Long Trail Brewing Company distributes its product throughout New England, New York, New Jersey, Pennsylvania, Maryland, Delaware, Virginia and the District of Columbia. 45% of its beer is consumed in Vermont.

== Misc. ==
The brewery's name derives from the Long Trail, a 272-mile hiking trail that snakes through the Green Mountains of Vermont.

In 2010, Long Trail Brewing Company acquired Otter Creek Brewing and with it Wolaver's Organic Brewery.

The Long Trail Brewery was featured in the Discovery Channel's television show Dirty Jobs with Mike Rowe in the Chick Sexer episode #1.7.

In August 2014, Long Trail Brewing Company filed a trademark infringement suit against Bent Paddle Brewing Company for using a logo of a hiker with a backpack similar to their own. The suit was amicably settled in December 2014, with Bent Paddle agreeing to discontinue the use of that logo and both breweries making charitable donations to hiking-related groups in one another's states.

== See also ==
- Beer in the United States
