= Lone Rock Point =

Coordinates: 44.490309°N 73.248739°W

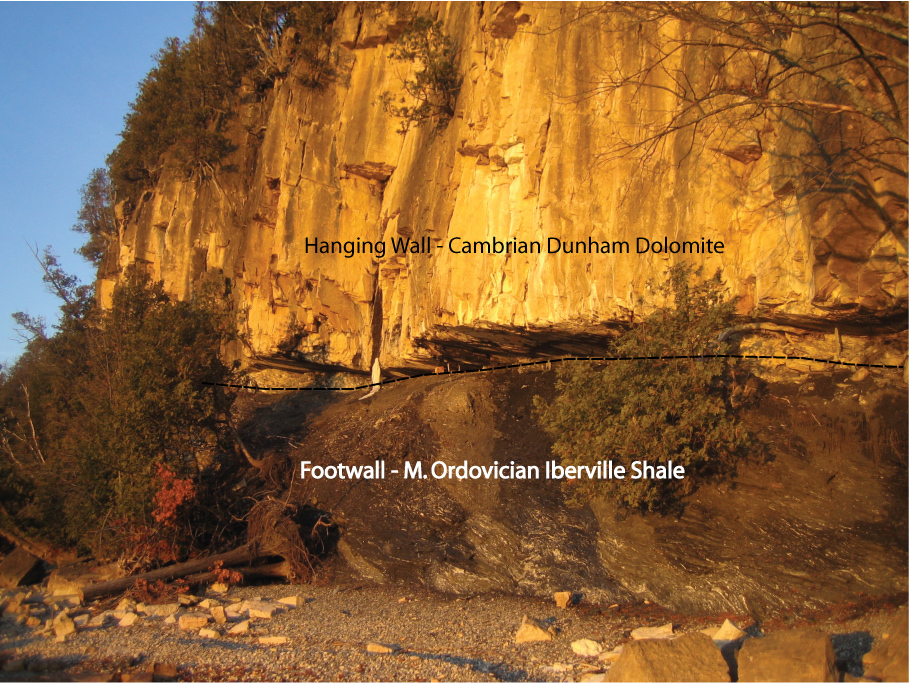
The contact between the Dunham Dolomite and Iberville Shale at Lone Rock Point

Lone Rock Point is a promontory north of Burlington, Vermont and on the eastern shore of Lake Champlain. It is publicly accessible via a trail network and sits on land owned by the Episcopal Diocese of Vermont.

The site is of geologic significance for its spectacular exposure of a thrust contact between the Cambrian-aged Dunham Dolomite and the Middle-Ordovician Iberville Shale. The thrust fault exposed at this location is regionally called the Champlain Thrust which formed during the Taconic Orogeny. At this site, the stratigraphic throw of the Champlain Thrust measures about 8,850 feet.

The site is arguably the most visited structural geology feature in all of New England and is featured in many structural geology text books as a classic example of a thrust fault.

== Dunham Dolomite ==
The Dunham Dolomite is a Cambrian dolomite that is exposed in the hanging wall of the Champlain Thrust Fault at Lone Rock Point. This unit was initially deposited in a warm, shallow sea environment as a platform carbonate. Well-exposed mullions at the base of the dolomite plunge about 15 degrees southeast, indicating transport direction (headed toward the modern lake). The light colored rocks along the shoreline are blocks of dolomite that have fallen after the shale eroded away.

== Iberville Shale ==
The Ordovician Iberville Shale was likely deposited in a deeper marine environment and consists of fine-grained clastic materials.^{[1]} Slip surfaces within the Iberville Shale seen at Lone Rock Point often contains calcite slickenlines along the planar thrust surface. Overlying pressure has led to a high degree of vertical faulting and calcite dissolution (white banding) throughout the unit. The top-most layer of the shale has been eroded away.
