= Quechee Gorge =

Canyon in Quechee, Vermont, US

Coordinates: 43.636°N 72.409°W

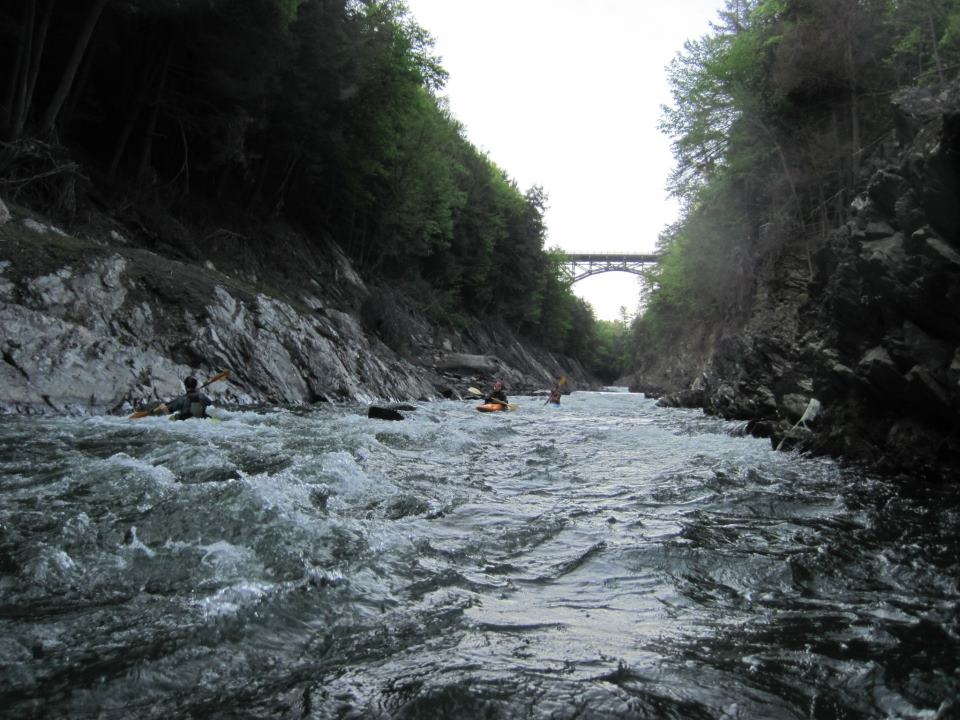
The Quechee Gorge below "Well Enough" rapids and the Quechee Gorge Bridge.

The Quechee Gorge is located in Quechee, Vermont along U.S. Route 4. The gorge is 165 feet deep and is the deepest gorge in Vermont. It serves as a popular tourist attraction in Quechee State Park and can be viewed from the U.S. Route 4 bridge and from trails on both sides of the gorge. Many people from around New England flock to the gorge for the views. The Ottauquechee River flows through the bottom of the gorge and is a popular whitewater kayak run.

== Geology ==
The gorge was carved approximately 13,000 years ago as the Laurentide Ice Sheet retreated across the region. The carving is thought to be a result of rapid downcutting of the Ottauquechee River after the drainage of glacial Lake Hitchcock. The gorge cuts through bedrock of the Devonian Gile Mountain Formation and Mesozoic mafic dikes can be seen on the west wall.
