= Bent Paddle Brewing Company =

Coordinates: 46.767726°N 92.122010°W

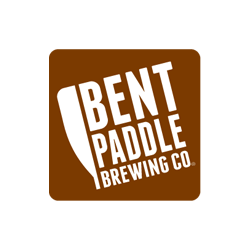
- Interactive map of Bent Paddle Brewing Company
- Location: Duluth, Minnesota; United States; BentPaddleBrewing.com
- Opened: 2013
- Annual production volume: 13,850 US beer barrels (16,250 hL) in 2015.
- Owned by: Bryon & Karen Tonnis and Colin & Laura Mullen

Active beers
Name	Type
Kanu	Session Pale Ale
Venture	Pilsener Lager
14° ESB	Extra Special Amber Ale
Bent Hop	Golden IPA
Black	Black Ale
Cold Press Black	Coffee Ale

Seasonal beers
Name	Type
Harness	Rye IPA
Pordij	Double IPA
Paddle Break Blonde	Belgian Style Blonde Ale
Roof Rack Lager	Vienna Style Lager

Other beers
Name	Type
Lollygagger	West Coast Pale Ale
Hop Forest	Double IPA
Double Shot Double Black	Black Ale

Bent Paddle Brewing Company is a microbrewery located in Duluth, Minnesota.

In May 2013, their brewery and taproom opened to the public with distribution of kegs and cans in the Duluth area beginning shortly thereafter. In November 2013, limited distribution of cans to liquor stores in the Minneapolis-St. Paul area began. An expansion was simultaneously announced with a stated goal of expanding production from 4,500 bbl to 8,000 bbl per year. As of 2015, Bent Paddle reported 13,850 bbl produced for the year.

== History ==
It was founded by Bryon & Karen Tonnis and Colin & Laura Mullen. Bryon Tonnis had most recently worked as the head brewer at the Rock Bottom Brewery location in Minneapolis while Colin Mullen had been the head brewer at Barley John's Brew Pub in New Brighton, Minnesota. Karen Tonnis manages the brewery's operations and distribution while Laura Mullen manages outreach and events (areas in which both have prior professional experience).

The origin of the brewery's name comes from both a bent canoe paddle Bryon Tonnis had used to mix his brewing mash as well as the brewers' shared love of canoeing.

The original taproom closed to the public in April 2018, while a new one opened just a block away. The original building remains Bent Paddle's primary brewing facility.

== Awards ==
As part of their "Best of MN" awards, the Minneapolis Star-Tribune named Bent Paddle the best new brewery in Greater Minnesota for 2014. The brewery also won a bronze medal at the 2014 Great American Beer Festival for their 14° ESB. The same beer won gold at the 2017 festival.

== Logo dispute ==
In August 2014, Long Trail Brewing Company filed a trademark infringement suit against Bent Paddle for using a logo of a hiker with a backpack similar to their own. The suit was amicably settled in December 2014 with Bent Paddle agreeing to discontinue the use of that logo and both breweries making charitable donations to hiking-related groups in one another's states.
