= Mid Vermont Christian School =

Coordinates: 43°38′38″N 72°25′40″W

Mid Vermont Christian School (MVCS) is a Christian PK-12 school in Quechee, Vermont (despite having a White River Junction postal address).

In 1999 Cassie Horner of The Windsor Chronicle described the school as "intentionally non-denominational".

In 2005 Jessica T. Lee of the Valley News described the school as "tight-knit".

In 2023 MVCS forfeited a basketball tournament when the school refused to play against a team with a trans athlete on the roster. The school was subsequently banned from all State tournaments for violating Vermont’s anti-discrimination policies. MVCS responded by filing a federal lawsuit alleging infringement of religious freedoms.

== History ==
Circa 1986, a group backed by four families began renting the Woodstock Baptist Church grange hall to hold Christian day school classes.

The school opened in 1987. The initial enrollment was five. In 1991 people supporting the school spent $600,000 to acquire a three-story building in order to house the classes. The building previously included a bar and a restaurant, and the supporters of the school spent $200,000 to transform it into a school building. A gymnasium was added, and the cost to build that was $450,000. In 1993 the student count was 111.

== Operations ==
In 1993 class sizes were typically 15.

== Curriculum ==
In 1999 the curriculum followed the standards of the State of Vermont and used state and Christian-oriented texts.

As of 1993, each week a 45-minute chapel was obligatory per student, and on a daily basis one hour was used to have classes on the Bible.

== Student body ==
In 1999 the student body originated from about 30 churches.

== Athletics ==
In 2023 the girls' basketball team was assigned to play a team with a player who is a transgender girl. The school's team forfeited the match due to “fairness of the game and the safety of our players.” As a result the Vermont Principals' Association (VPA) forbade the school from competition.
