= Vermont Route 23 =

State highway in Addison County, Vermont, US

Vermont Route 23
- Weybridge Road
- VT 23 highlighted in red

Route information
- Maintained by the Towns of Middlebury and Weybridge
- Length: 7.370 mi (11.861 km)

Major junctions
- South end: VT 125 in Middlebury
- North end: VT 17 in Weybridge

Location
- Country: United States
- State: Vermont
- Counties: Addison

Highway system
- State highways in Vermont
← VT 22A	→ VT 25

Vermont Route 23 (VT 23) is a 7.370-mile-long (11.861 km) north–south state highway in Addison County, Vermont, United States. It is maintained by the towns of Middlebury and Weybridge and runs north from VT 125 in Middlebury to VT 17 in Weybridge.

== Route description ==
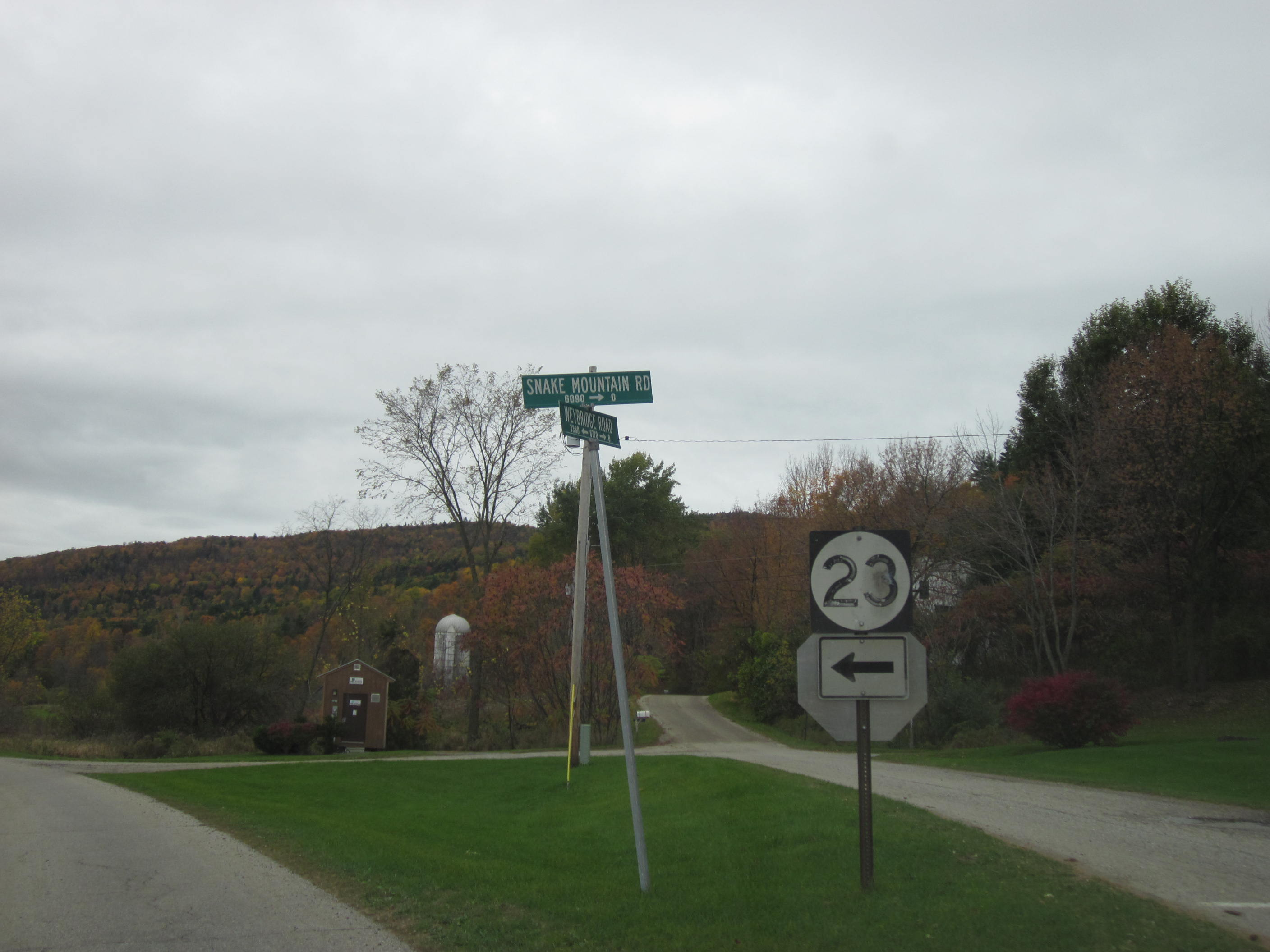
VT 23 signage at the junction with Snake Mountain Road in Weybridge

VT 23 begins at an intersection with VT 125 (College Street) in the town of Middlebury, just a block north of VT 30 (South Main Street). VT 23, maintained locally its entire length rather than by the state of Vermont, runs northwest past some homes as a two-lane road on the western side of Middlebury. Paralleling the Otter Creek, leaving downtown Middlebury near a junction with Pulp Mill Bridge Road. The route turns rural, changing names to Weybridge Road, passing several farms. Now in the town of Weybridge, VT 23 continues northwest, reaching a junction with James Road, in the center of Weybridge, turning north until Quaker Village Road. At that junction, VT 23 turns northwest past Weybridge Cemetery, leaving the section of Weybridge with some business.

Now in the rural sections of Weybridge again, VT 23 makes a gradual curve to the southwest near the junction with Drake Road, the route returns to a parallel with the Otter Creek. Continuing along the creek, the route and the waterway make a big turn to the north, crossing through rural Addison County. VT 23 turns away from the creek for a short distance, returning to sides at Thompson Hill Road. At Thompson Hill Road, the route changes from westward to the north again, winding through farms to a junction with Snake Mountain Road. There, the route turns northeast for a short stretch, turning northward again and reaching a junction with the state-maintained VT 17 near the line with the towns of Addison and New Haven. This junction marks the northern terminus of VT 23.

== Major intersections ==
The entire route is in Addison County.

Location	mi	km	Destinations	Notes
Middlebury	0.000	0.000	VT 125 (College Street) to VT 30	Southern terminus; to VT 30 via VT 125 east
Weybridge	7.370	11.861	VT 17 (Otter Creek Highway) – Addison, New Haven Jct., Bristol	Northern terminus
1.000 mi = 1.609 km; 1.000 km = 0.621 mi
