= Quechee Ski Area =

Ski area in Vermont, United States

Coordinates: 43.6572°N 72.4431°W

The Quechee Ski Area is a small ski mountain in Quechee, Vermont, United States.

The mountain has 13 trails and 3 lifts: 1 quadruple chairlift, 1 T-bar and 1 H-tow. The main lift, "Quadzilla" services the top of the ski area, going from an altitude of 640 feet to 1,220 feet, for a vertical drop of 580 feet; the rope tow and t-bar are part of the beginner area. It is a part of the Quechee Club.
