= Lyman Bridge =

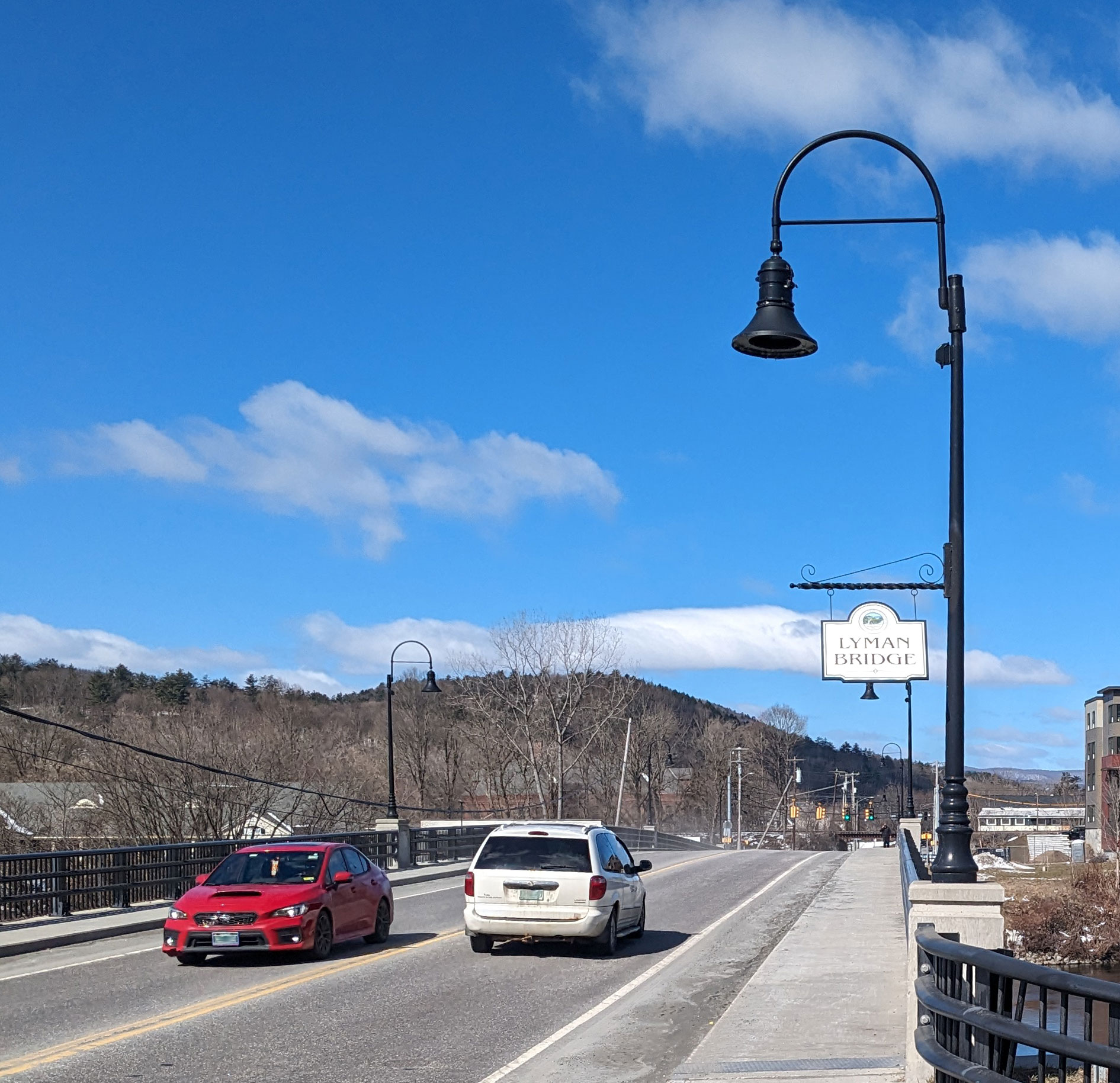
- Looking west into Vermont
- Coordinates: 43°39′2″N 72°18′51″W
- Carries: U.S. Route 4
- Crosses: Connecticut River
- Locale: West Lebanon, New Hampshire, and White River Junction, Vermont
- Maintained by: New Hampshire Department of Transportation

Characteristics
- Design: Beam bridge, originally a covered bridge

History
- Opened: October 28, 2017

The Lyman Bridge crosses the Connecticut River to connect West Lebanon, New Hampshire, to White River Junction, Vermont. It is named for Elias Lyman, who built the original bridge at this location. The current bridge was opened on Saturday, October 28, 2017.

The Lyman Bridge carries U.S. Route 4 and a pedestrian walkway on both sides.

== History ==
In 1836 the Lyman Bridge was removed and replaced with a three-span covered toll bridge.

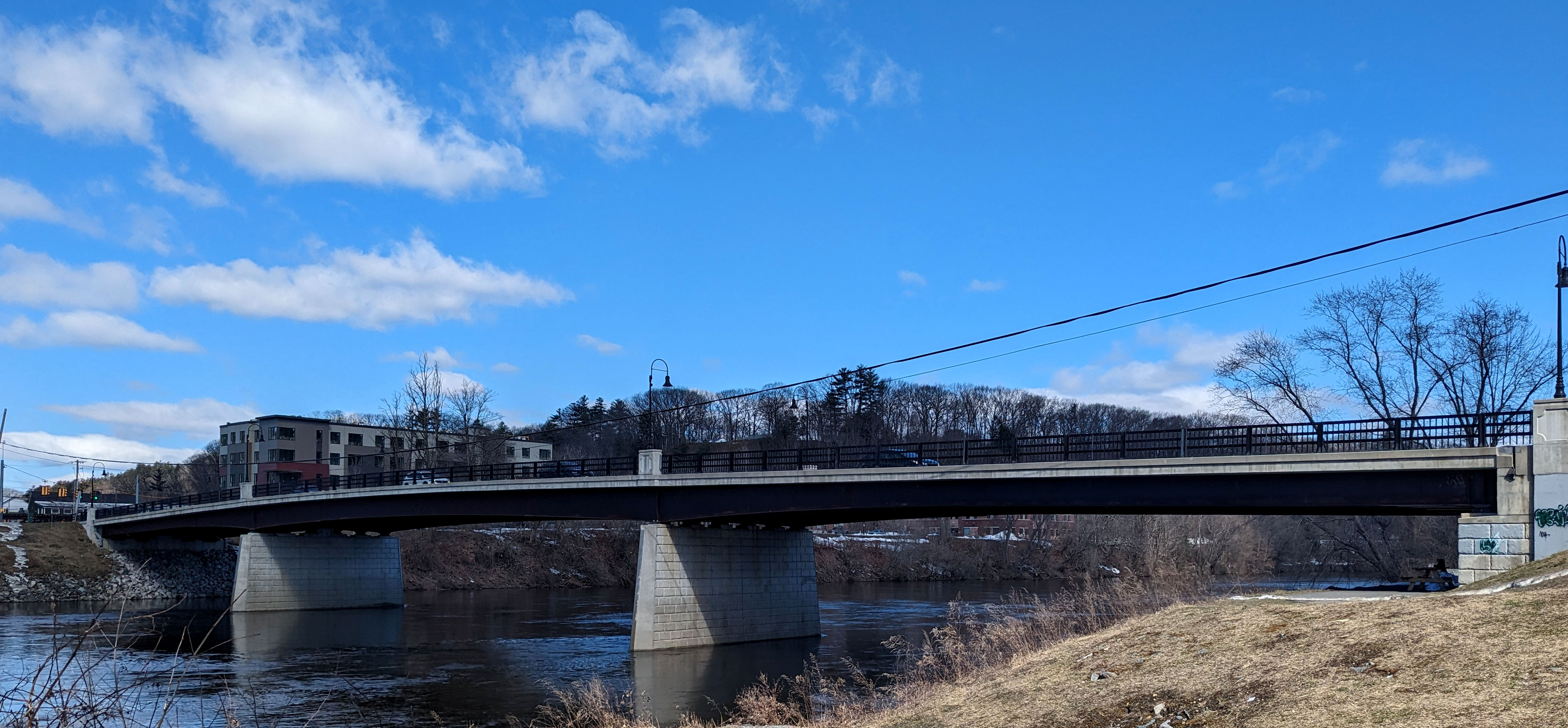
A photograph showing the span of the Lyman Bridge from the New Hampshire side

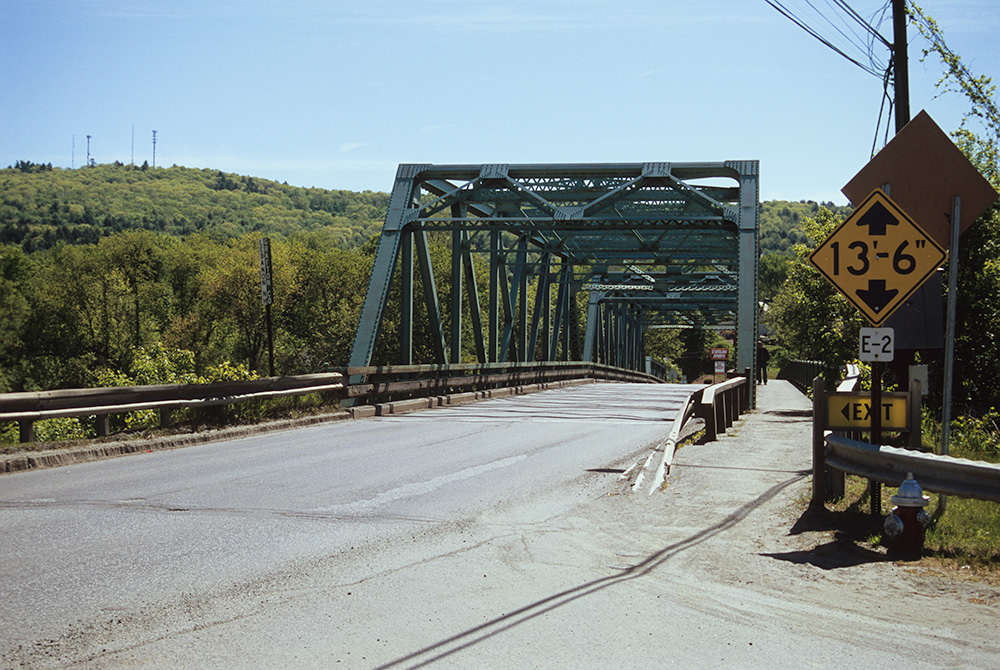
Previous bridge, taken in 2008

== See also ==
- List of crossings of the Connecticut River
