= Middletown Springs (CDP), Vermont =

Census-designated place in Vermont, United States

Middletown Springs, Vermont
- Census-designated place
- Location within Vermont Location within the United States
- Coordinates: 43°29′08″N 73°07′34″W
- Country: United States
- State: Vermont
- County: Rutland
- Town: Middletown Springs

Area
  - Total: 0.69 sq mi (1.80 km^{2})
  - Land: 0.69 sq mi (1.80 km^{2})
  - Water: 0 sq mi (0.0 km^{2})
- Elevation: 899 ft (274 m)

Population (2020)
  - Total: 194
- Time zone: UTC-5 (Eastern (EST))
  - Summer (DST): UTC-4 (EDT)
- ZIP Code: 05757
- Area code: 802
- FIPS code: 50-44725
- GNIS feature ID: 2807151

Middletown Springs is the primary village and a census-designated place (CDP) in the town of Middletown Springs, Rutland County, Vermont, United States. As of the 2020 census, it had a population of 194, out of 794 in the entire town.

== Geography ==
The CDP is in western Rutland County, at the geographic center of the town of Middletown Springs. Vermont Route 140 passes through the center of the village, leading east 10 miles (16 km) to Wallingford and northwest 8 miles (13 km) to Poultney. Vermont Route 133 leads south from the village center 11 miles (18 km) to Pawlet. Route 133 joins Route 140 going east out of the village, but turns north and leads to West Rutland, 11 miles (18 km) northeast of the village.

Middletown Springs is within the Taconic Mountains, in the valley of the Poultney River, which forms the southern edge of the CDP. The river flows west and north to the south end of Lake Champlain on the Vermont/New York border.
