= Bridgewater, Vermont =

- Town
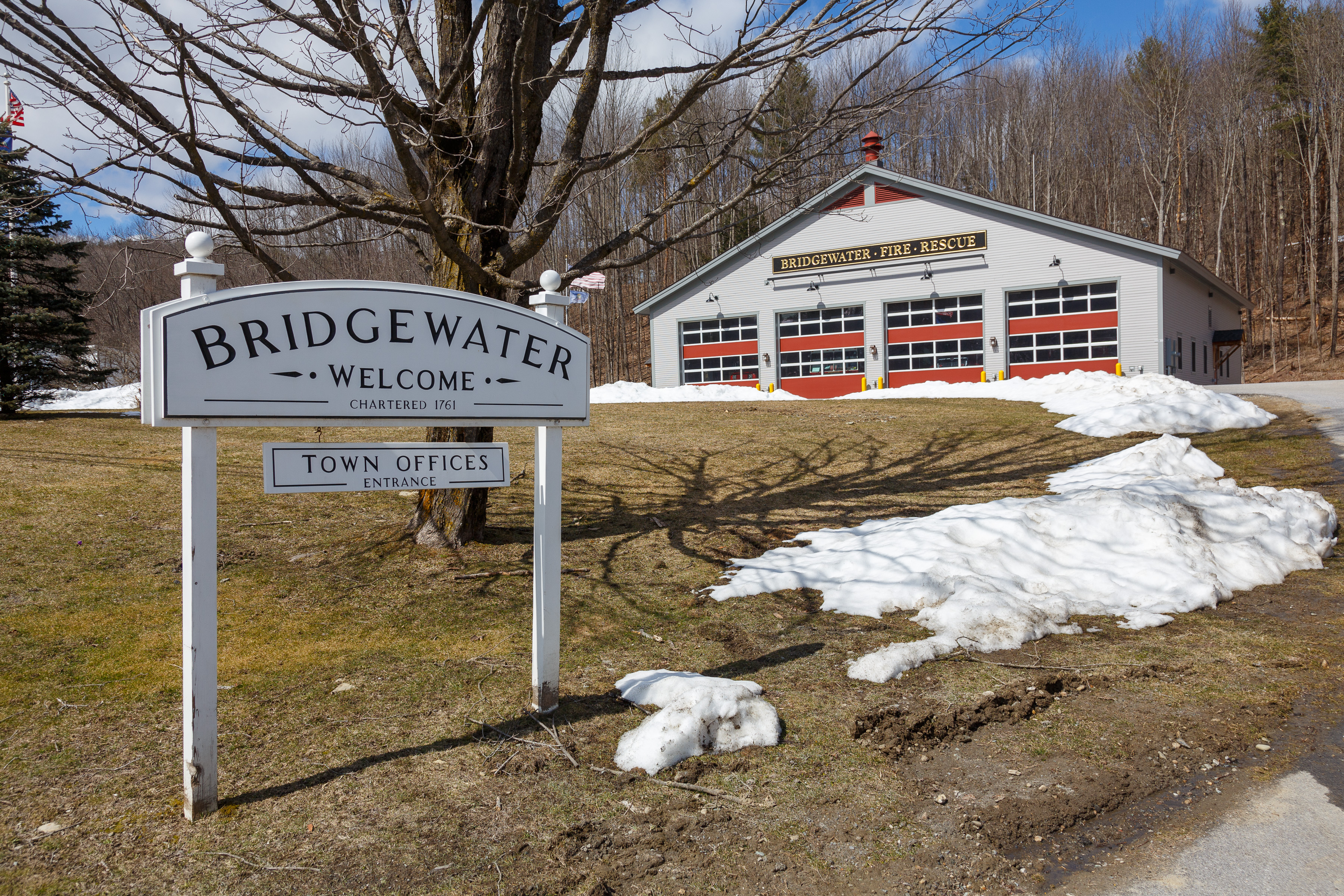
- Bridgewater Fire and Rescue

- Location in Windsor County and the state of Vermont.
- Coordinates: 43°37′10″N 72°40′19″W
- Country: United States
- State: Vermont
- County: Windsor
- Chartered: 1761
- Settled: 1779
- Organized: 1785
- Communities: Bridgewater; Bridgewater Center; Bridgewater Corners; West Bridgewater

Area
  - Total: 49.5 sq mi (128.3 km^{2})
  - Land: 49.4 sq mi (128.0 km^{2})
  - Water: 0.15 sq mi (0.4 km^{2})
- Elevation: 1,053 ft (321 m)

Population (2020)
  - Total: 903
  - Density: 18.3/sq mi (7.05/km^{2})
- Time zone: UTC-5 (Eastern (EST))
  - Summer (DST): UTC-4 (EDT)
- ZIP Codes: 05034 (Bridgewater); 05035 (Bridgewater Corners); 05091 (Woodstock)
- Area code: 802
- FIPS code: 50-08275
- GNIS feature ID: 1462050
- Website: www.bridgewater.vt.gov

Bridgewater is a town in Windsor County, Vermont, United States. The population was 903 at the 2020 census. Bridgewater contains the hamlets of Bridgewater Village, Bridgewater Corners, West Bridgewater, and Bridgewater Center (formerly called Briggs).

== Geography ==
According to the United States Census Bureau, the town has a total area of 49.5 square miles (128.3 km^{2}), of which 49.4 square miles (128.0 km^{2}) is land and 0.15 square miles (0.4 km^{2}), or 0.27%, is water. The Ottauquechee River flows west to east through the town. U.S. Route 4 follows the river, connecting Woodstock and White River Junction to the east with Rutland to the west. The Appalachian Trail passes through the town, running along the northern border.

== Demographics ==
Historical population
Census	Pop.	Note	%±
1790	293		—
1800	781		166.6%
1810	1,125		44.0%
1820	1,125		0.0%
1830	1,311		16.5%
1840	1,363		4.0%
1850	1,311		−3.8%
1860	1,292		−1.4%
1870	1,141		−11.7%
1880	1,084		−5.0%
1890	1,124		3.7%
1900	972		−13.5%
1910	874		−10.1%
1920	808		−7.6%
1930	741		−8.3%
1940	895		20.8%
1950	903		0.9%
1960	776		−14.1%
1970	783		0.9%
1980	867		10.7%
1990	895		3.2%
2000	980		9.5%
2010	936		−4.5%
2020	903		−3.5%
U.S. Decennial Census

As of the census of 2000, there were 980 people, 395 households, and 250 families residing in the town. The population density was 19.8 people per square mile (7.6/km^{2}). There were 582 housing units at an average density of 11.7 per square mile (4.5/km^{2}). The racial makeup of the town was 98.47% White, 0.31% Native American, 0.51% Asian, and 0.71% from two or more races. Hispanic or Latino of any race were 0.10% of the population.

There were 395 households, out of which 27.8% had children under the age of 18 living with them, 57.5% were married couples living together, 4.6% had a female householder with no husband present, and 36.5% were non-families. 27.6% of all households were made up of individuals, and 10.9% had someone living alone who was 65 years of age or older. The average household size was 2.48 and the average family size was 3.08.

In the town, the population was spread out, with 23.1% under the age of 18, 5.6% from 18 to 24, 29.4% from 25 to 44, 28.7% from 45 to 64, and 13.3% who were 65 years of age or older. The median age was 41 years. For every 100 females, there were 102.9 males. For every 100 females age 18 and over, there were 102.7 males.

The median income for a household in the town was $39,107, and the median income for a family was $47,500. Males had a median income of $27,727 versus $22,857 for females. The per capita income for the town was $19,811. About 4.9% of families and 7.9% of the population were below the poverty line, including 9.0% of those under age 18 and 11.9% of those age 65 or over.

== See also ==
- Long Trail Brewing Company
