= Special routes of U.S. Route 4 =

Special routes of U.S. Route 4

Highway system
- United States Numbered Highway System; List; Special; Divided

A total of at least five special routes of U.S. Route 4 (US 4) have existed.

== Fair Haven–West Rutland alternate route ==
U.S. Route 4 Alternate
- Location: Fair Haven–West Rutland, Vermont

== Rutland business loop ==
U.S. Route 4 Business
- Location: Rutland, Vermont
- Length: 4.371 mi (7.034 km)

U.S. Route 4 Business (US 4 Bus.) is a 4.371-mile (7.034 km) alternate route of US 4 serving the city of Rutland, Vermont, and running north of US 4. It begins at exit 6 of the US 4 expressway in West Rutland and heads north to Main Street in West Rutland center, where it meets the east end of Vermont Route 4A (VT 4A). US 4 Bus. turns east, following Main Street into the town of Rutland. In the town of Rutland, the road changes names to Rutland Road and intersects with VT 3 at the town center. About 0.3 miles (0.48 km) later, the road enters the city of Rutland, becoming West Street. US 4 Bus. briefly shifts north one block to use State Street before returning to West Street after half a mile (0.80 km). The route ends at an intersection with US 4 and US 7 in the center of the city.

== Andover–Boscawen alternate route ==
U.S. Route 4 Alternate
- Location: Andover–Boscawen, New Hampshire

== Concord bypass route ==
U.S. Route 4 Bypass
- Location: Concord, New Hampshire

== East Northwood–Dover alternate route ==
U.S. Route 4 Alternate
- Location: East Northwood–Dover, New Hampshire
