= Champlain Thrust =

Fault in Quebec, Vermont, and New York

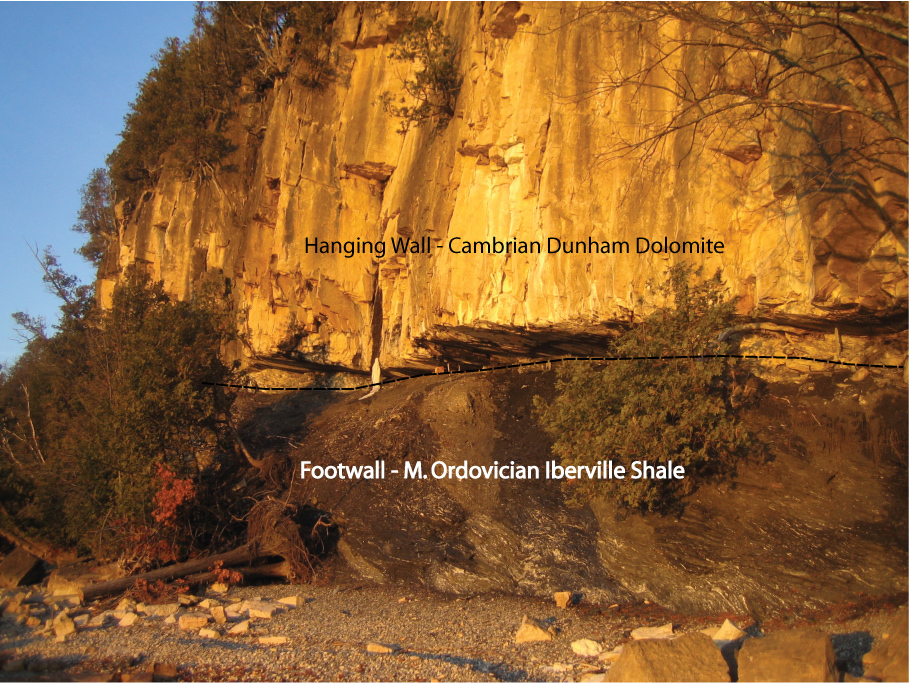
- Champlain Thrust Fault, Lone Rock Point, Burlington Vermont

Geology
- Orogeny: Taconic Orogeny
- Rock age: Ordovician

The Champlain Thrust is a 200-mile-long (320 km) fault extending from southern Quebec, down through western Vermont in the Champlain Valley, and into eastern New York in the Catskills/Hudson Valley. This east-dipping thrust fault transports Cambrian–Ordovician passive margin shelf rocks westward by about 30–50 miles (48–80 km) and places them on top of Middle Ordovician rocks. The Middle Ordovician accretion of the one or more island arc terranes drove the initial thrusting during the Taconic Orogeny, though reactivation of the fault may have occurred during the middle Devonian Acadian Orogeny. The Champlain Thrust marks the most westerly thrust of the Taconic Orogeny.

== Prominent exposures ==
The thrust fault is exposed to the north of the city of Burlington, Vermont on the shores of Lake Champlain at Lone Rock Point. Here the Lower Cambrian Dunham Dolomite can be seen thrust on top of the Middle Ordovician Iberville shales.
