= Vermont Route 22A =

Highway in Vermont, USA

Vermont Route 22A
- VT 22A highlighted in red

Route information
- Maintained by VTrans
- Length: 44.738 mi (71.999 km)
- Existed: December 19, 1945–present

Major junctions
- South end: NY 22A at the New York state line in Fair Haven
- VT 4A in Fair Haven; US 4 in Fair Haven; VT 73 in Orwell; VT 74 in Shoreham; VT 125 in Bridport; VT 17 in Addison
- North end: US 7 in Ferrisburgh

Location
- Country: United States
- State: Vermont
- Counties: Rutland, Addison

Highway system
- State highways in Vermont
← VT 19	→ VT 23
← Route 30	N.E.	→ Route 32
← VT 30	VT 30A	→ VT 30B

Vermont Route 22A (VT 22A) is a 44.738-mile-long (71.999 km) state highway in western Vermont, United States. It is the northward continuation of New York State Route 22A. Its southern end is at the New York state line in Fair Haven and its northern end is in Ferrisburgh at U.S. Route 7 (US 7). As it is an extension of NY 22A, VT 22A is a spur route of NY 22, which runs roughly parallel to VT 22A west of the state border. This is a rather unusual case of one state having a suffixed route of another state's primary route. Vermont does not currently have a "Route 22."

All of VT 22A north of Fair Haven was originally designated as Route 30A, a highway in the New England road marking system, in 1922. Route 30A was added to the Vermont state highway system in 1935 as Vermont Route 30A. An extension south to the New York state line was added to the route later in the decade. VT 30A was renumbered to VT 22A on December 19, 1945 when New York renumbered the continuation across the state line.

== Route description ==
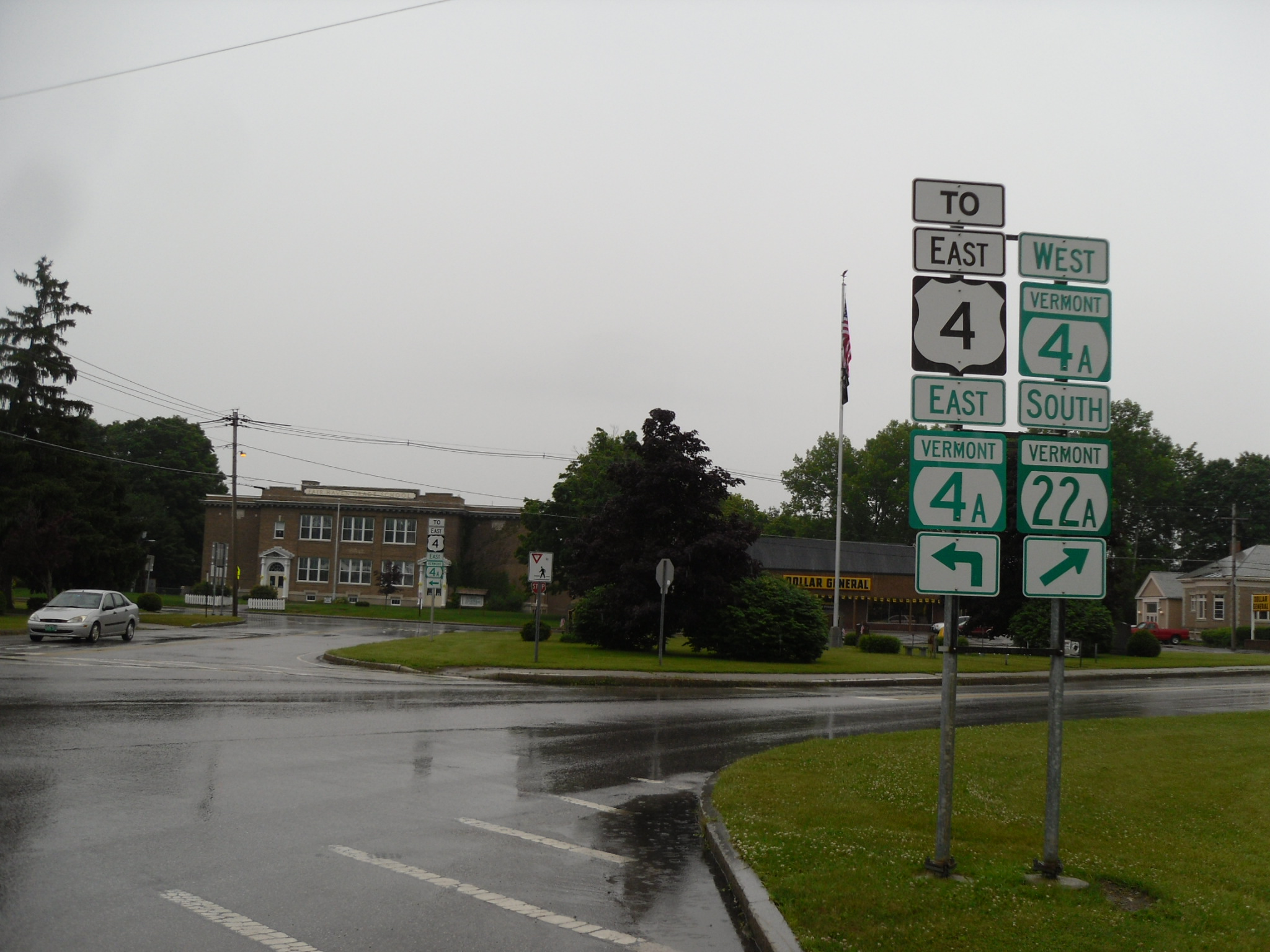
VT 22A at the junction with VT 4A at the north end of Fair Haven

VT 22A begins at the New York–Vermont state line in the town of Fair Haven. A northern continuation of NY 22A, VT 22A continues north of the Poultney River as South Main Street, crossing through Fair Haven as a two-lane rural road. North of Cemetery Street, the route enters the center of Fair Haven, crossing tracks used by Amtrak for their Ethan Allen Express and passing west of the site of the Fair Haven station. Just north of the tracks, VT 22A meets VT 4A (Prospect Street), which becomes concurrent, running north through the commercial center of Fair Haven. Just north of Maple Street, VT 22A and VT 4A reach North Main Street, which VT 4A continues north on, while VT 22A turns west onto North Park Place.

Crossing northwest through Fair Haven, VT 22A crosses past multiple residential streets along Washington Street, soon leaving the center of Fair Haven and entering exit 2 of US 4. Continuing northwest out of downtown Fair Haven, VT 22A retains the Washington Street moniker through Fair Haven, approaching the New York state line once again, however it bends north less than 1-mile (1.6 km) east of the Poultney River. VT 22A then crosses into the town of West Haven, where VT 22A becomes a two-lane rural roadway, passing a local oval racetrack as it crosses into the town of Benson. The route crosses the Hubbardton River and begins paralleling the river northward into the center of Benson.

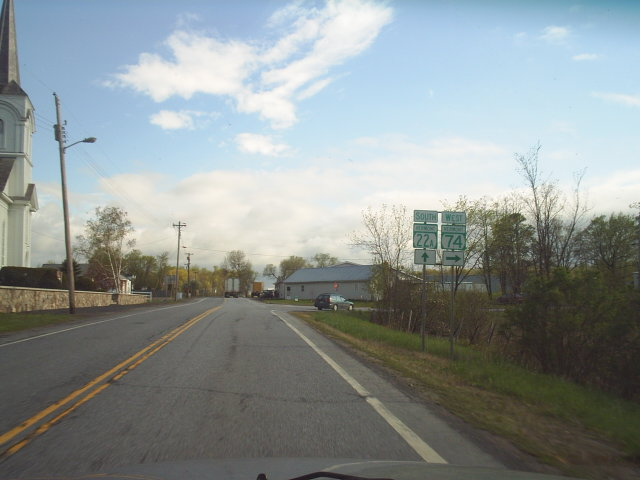
VT 22A at the VT 74 west junction in Shoreham

Just north of the center, VT 22A reaches a junction with the western terminus of VT 144, which forks to the northeast along the Hubbardton River. VT 22A runs northwest, bending north and weaving to the Rutland County line, crossing into Addison County. North of the county line, VT 22A enters the town of Orwell, crossing through more rural areas in Addison County, crossing a junction with VT 73 (Main Street) as it bypasses downtown Orwell. VT 73 curves north just west of VT 22A and as a result, the routes parallel northward through Orwell before VT 73 turns west towards the New York state line. VT 22A continues north through Orwell, passing multiple farms on its way up.

A short distance later, VT 22A crosses into the town of Shoreham, crossing straight north into the center of the town, meeting a junction with VT 74 (Main Street). VT 74 and VT 22A are concurrent for a short distance before VT 74 turns to the northeast north of downtown Shoreham. VT 22A continues winding through rural Addison County, crossing into the town of Bridport just south of North Cream Hill Road. The route passes through more farms as it winds northward, soon reaching the commercial center of Bridport. In the center, VT 22A reaches a junction with VT 125, which becomes concurrent through Bridport. VT 125 turns west a short distance after the commercial center, running west to the Champlain Bridge and VT 17.

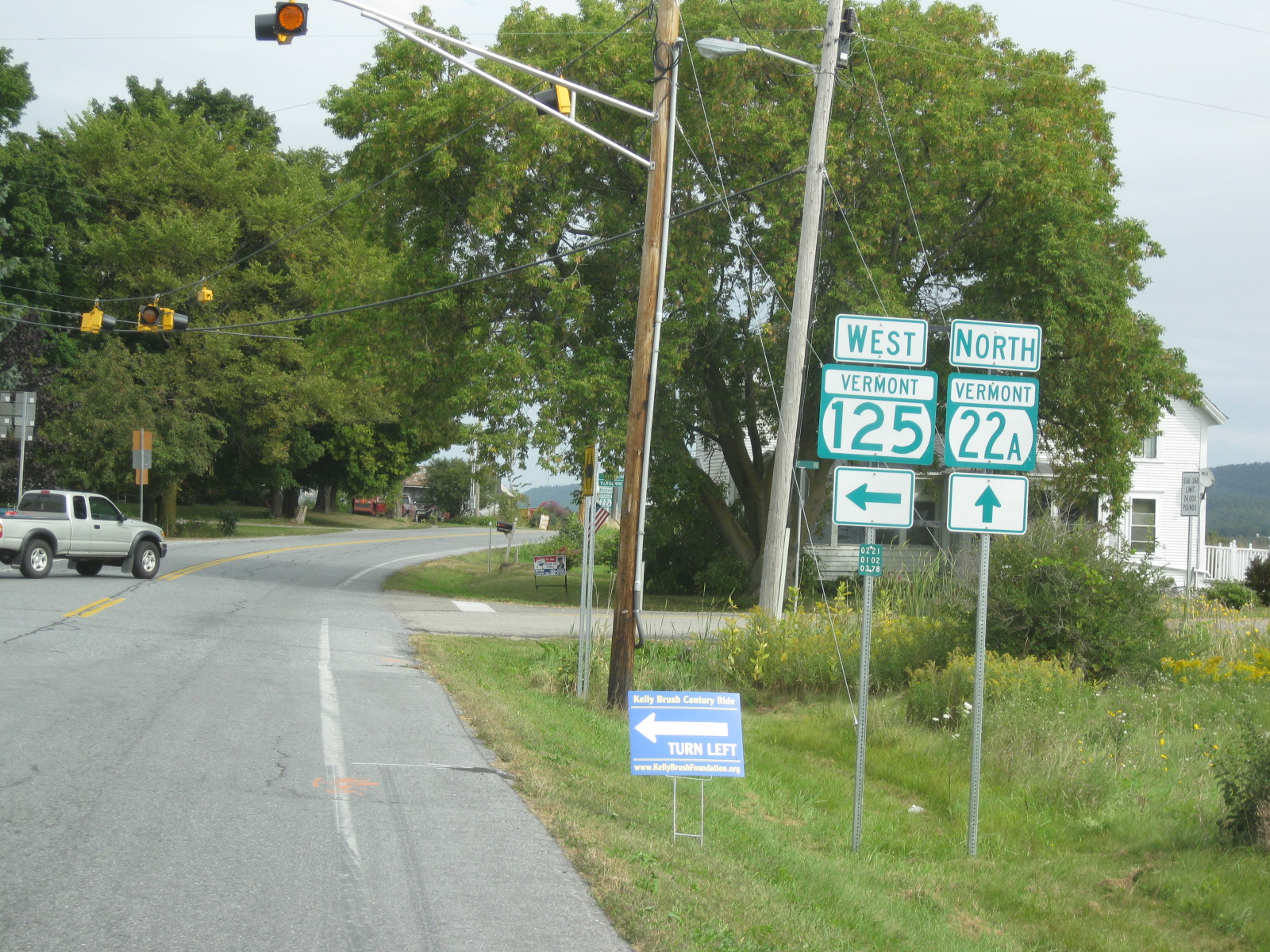
VT 22A at VT 125 west in Bridport

VT 22A continues north through the town of Bridport, passing multiple farms once again, and reaching Town Line Road, where it crosses into Addison. The scenery around VT 22A does not change much in Addison, running northeast and soon northwest as it passes multiple residences in the area. VT 22A straightens to the north, reaching the center of Addison, and the junction with VT 17. North of VT 17, the route bends northeast, passing multiple residences on both directions. The route soon crosses into Panton, crossing northeast past more homes and soon reaching the village of Vergennes. Through Vergennes, VT 22A becomes known as West Main Street, passing Prospect Street on its way northeast. Just after Canal Street, the route crosses the Otter Creek and enters the center of Vergennes.

Now known as Main Street, VT 22A crosses through the center of Vergennes as a two-lane street, reaching a junction with Green Street, which connects to US 7 via New Haven Road. VT 22A turns northeast further, crossing past residences as North Main Street, making a large curve around railroad tracks as it leaves the village of Vergennes and reaches the town of Ferrisburgh right after the tracks. Now in Ferrisburgh, VT 22A reaches a junction itself with US 7, marking the northern terminus of VT 22A, whose right-of-way ends at the junction.

== History ==

The portion of modern VT 22A from VT 4A in Fair Haven to Green Street in Vergennes was originally designated as Route 30A, a highway in the New England road marking system, in 1922. All of Route 30A was added to the Vermont state highway system as part of the 1935 state highway system expansion. It was initially designated VT 30A. A highway connecting VT 30A to New York State Route 286 at the New York state line was added to the state highway system in 1939 and designated VT 286. New York renumbered NY 286 to NY 22A on December 19, 1945 as part of a bi-state agreement between Vermont and New York to create a single designation. Vermont replaced VT 30A and VT 286 with VT 22A.

== Major intersections ==
County	Location	mi	km	Destinations	Notes
Rutland	Fair Haven	0.000	0.000	NY 22A south – Granville	Continuation into New York
Rutland	Fair Haven	1.525	2.454	VT 4A west (Prospect Street) – Whitehall NY	Southern end of concurrency with VT 4A
Rutland	Fair Haven	1.865	3.001	VT 4A east (North Main Street)	Northern end of concurrency with VT 4A
Rutland	Fair Haven	2.798– 2.977	4.503– 4.791	US 4 – Castleton, Rutland, Whitehall NY	Exit 2 (US 4); diamond interchange
Rutland	Benson	10.924	17.580	VT 144 east – Hortonia	Western terminus of VT 144
Addison	Orwell	17.288	27.822	VT 73 west / VT 73 east (Main Street) – Orwell, Brandon, Ferry to NY State	
Addison	Shoreham	23.589	37.963	VT 74 west (Main Street) – Ferry to NY State	Southern end of concurrency with VT 74
Addison	Shoreham	24.018	38.653	VT 74 east – Cornwall, Middlebury	Northern end of concurrency with VT 74
Addison	Bridport	30.196	48.596	VT 125 east – Middlebury	Southern end of concurrency with VT 125
Addison	Bridport	30.654	49.333	VT 125 west – Chimney Point, Bridge to NY State	Northern end of concurrency with VT 125
Addison	Addison	37.330	60.077	VT 17 – New Haven Junction, Bridge to NY State	
Addison	Ferrisburgh	44.738	71.999	US 7 – Ferrisburgh, Burlington, New Haven Junction, Middlebury	Northern terminus
1.000 mi = 1.609 km; 1.000 km = 0.621 mi: Concurrency terminus
