= Ottauquechee River =

River in the U.S. state of Vermont

Coordinates: 43.6651023°N 72.7811448°W

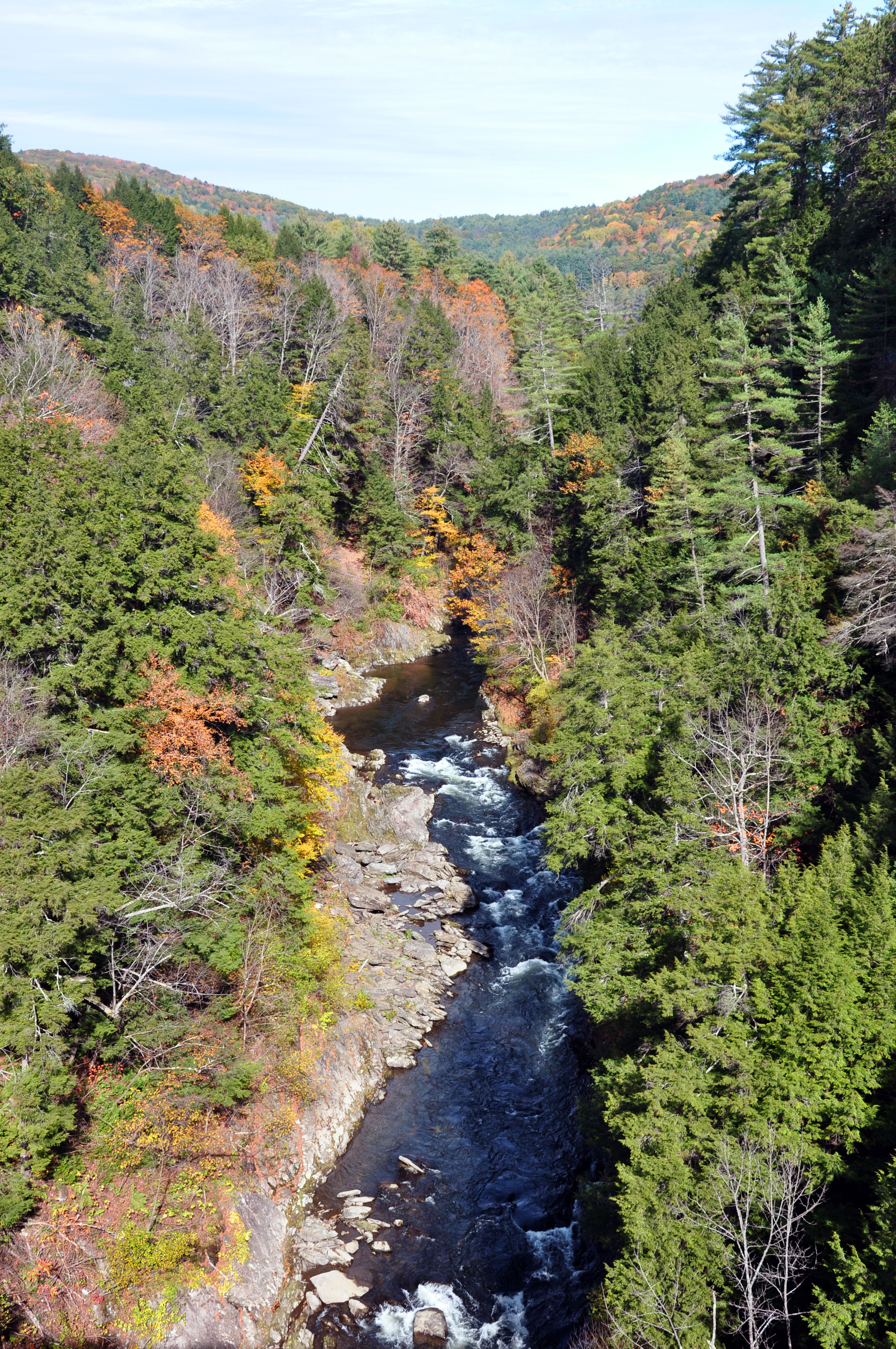
Quechee Gorge

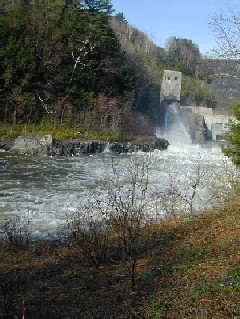
The Ottauquechee River flowing from a hydroelectric facility downstream of North Hartland Lake. Hartland

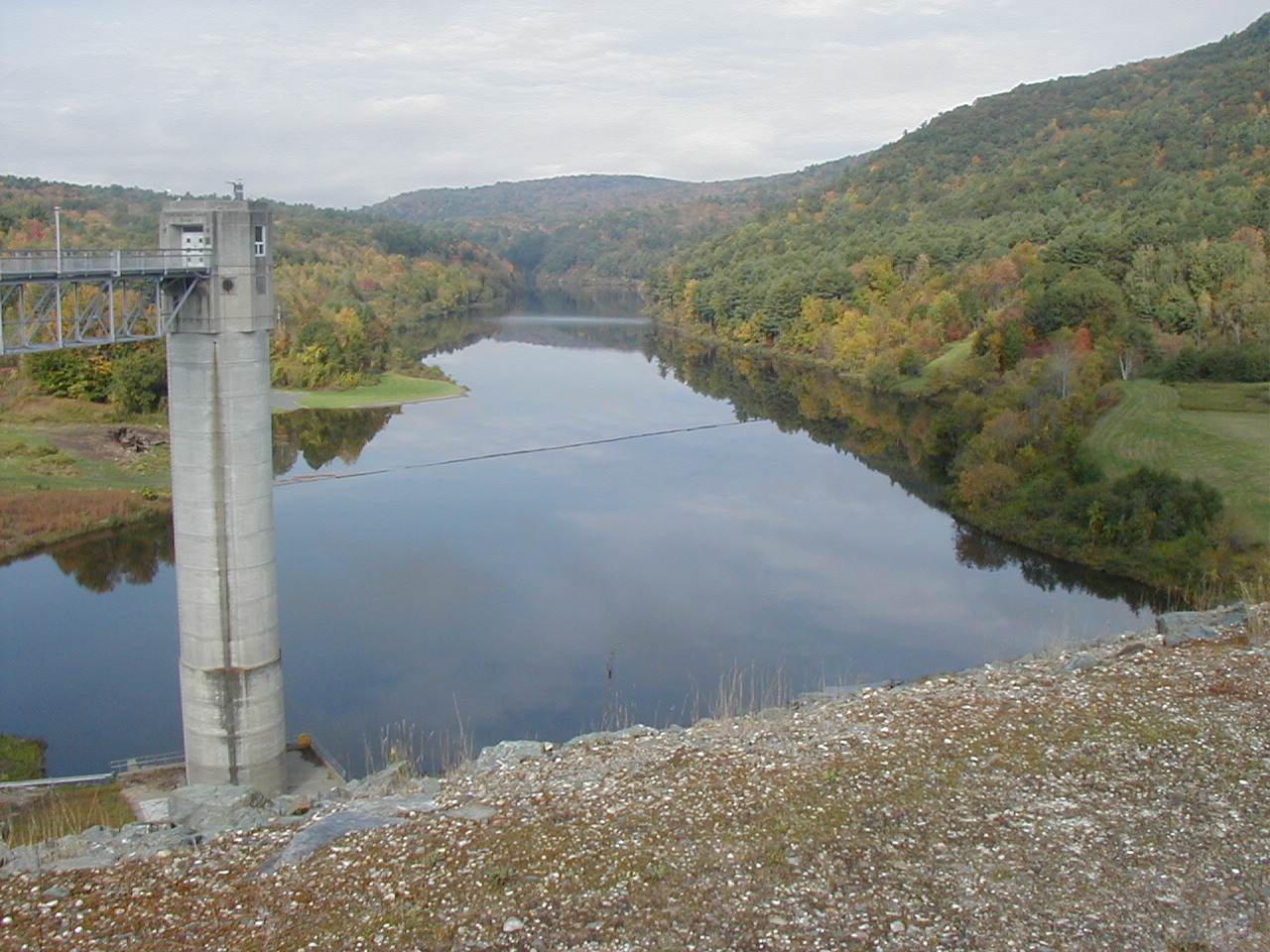
North Hartland Lake formed by the dam in the front of the photo

The Ottauquechee River (pronounced AWT-ah-KWEE-chee) is a 41.4-mile-long (66.6 km) river in eastern Vermont in the United States. It is a tributary of the Connecticut River, which flows to Long Island Sound.

The Ottauquechee rises in the Green Mountains in eastern Rutland County in the town of Killington, and flows generally eastwardly into Windsor County, where it passes through or along the boundaries of the towns of Bridgewater, Woodstock, Pomfret, Hartford and Hartland; and the villages of Woodstock and Quechee. It joins the Connecticut River in the town of Hartland, about 4 miles (6 km) south-southwest of White River Junction.

A headwaters tributary known as the North Branch Ottauquechee River flows southeastwardly through the towns of Killington and Bridgewater.

Quechee State Park is located along the river near the village of Quechee. Near the river's mouth the U.S. Army Corps of Engineers' North Hartland Dam impounds the river to form North Hartland Lake.

Near the state park, the river flows through the 165-foot-deep (50 m) Quechee Gorge. The U.S. Rt. 4 bridge crosses over the gorge and provides good viewing down into its depths.

In late August 2011, Hurricane Irene swept through the Ottauquechee River watershed, raising the water level in the river to far beyond its normal height. Houses and towns along the river were devastated.

== Variant names and spellings ==
The U.S. Board on Geographic Names settled on "Ottauquechee River" as the stream's name in 1908. According to the Geographic Names Information System, it has also been known historically as:

- Otta Quechee River
- Ottaquechee River
- Ottaqueeche River
- Queechee River
- Queechy River
- Water Quechee River
- Waterchuichi River
- Waterqueechy River
- Waterqueechy

== See also ==
- List of Vermont rivers
