= Quechee State Park =

Park in Vermont, USA

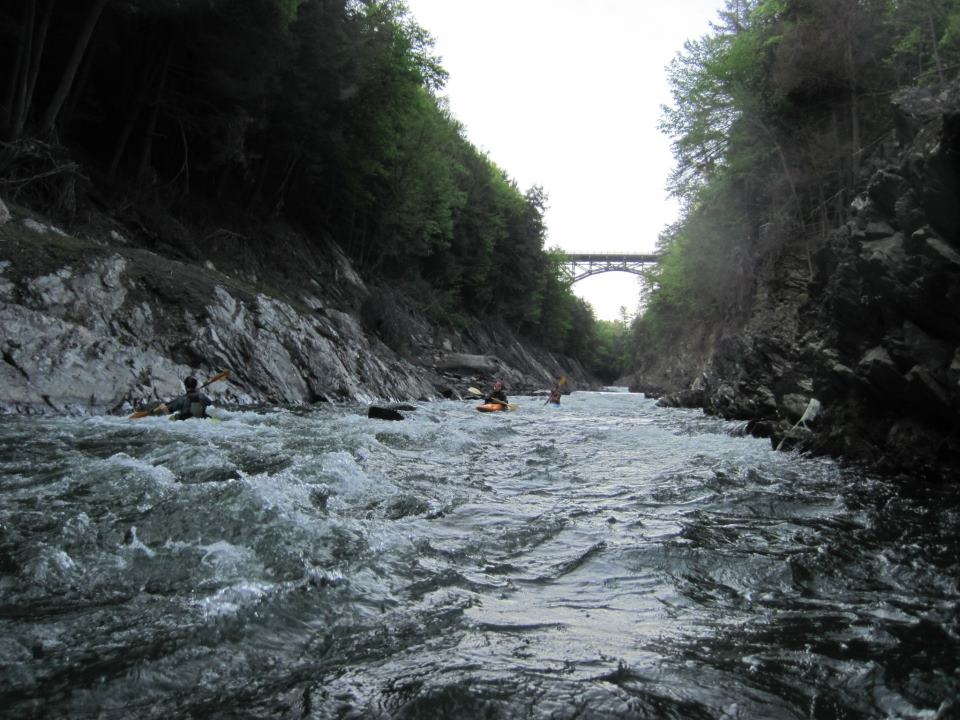
- Quechee Gorge

- Location within Vermont
- Location: 5800 Woodstock Road; Hartford, VT
- Coordinates: 43°38′12.54″N 72°24′1.92″W
- Established: 1965
- Operator: Vermont Department of Forests, Parks, and Recreation
- Open: Mid May - mid October
- Website: https://vtstateparks.com/quechee.html

The Quechee State Park is located on US Route 4 in Quechee, Vermont. The park land is owned by the US Army Corps of Engineers and leased from by the State of Vermont. The park contains the Quechee Gorge, a popular Vermont tourist stop. The land was originally the site of the Dewey wool mill which ceased operation in 1952 and relocated to Enfield, New Hampshire. Shortly after the closing of the Mill the US Army Corps of Engineers acquired the property as part of its regional flood control plan. A hydroelectric dam sits at the north end of the gorge.

Activities include camping, hiking, swimming, river fishing, picnicking, wildlife watching and winter sports.

Camping facilities include 45 tent/trailer sites and 7 lean-to sites, two bathrooms with showers and a sanitary dump station. There is also a large field and play area, a picnic area next to Quechee Gorge with a pit toilet and a hiking trail along the gorge.

== See also ==
- List of Vermont state parks
