= U.S. Route 4 =

Southwest-northeast U.S. route from New York State to Vermont

U.S. Route 4
- US 4 highlighted in red

Route information
- Length: 252.62 mi (406.55 km)
- Existed: 1926–present

Major junctions
- West end: US 9 / US 20 in East Greenbush, NY
- I-90 in East Greenbush, NY; US 7 in Rutland, VT; I-89 in Hartford, VT; I-91 / US 5 in White River Junction, VT; I-89 in Lebanon, NH; I-93 / US 3 / US 202 in Concord, NH
- East end: I-95 / Blue Star Turnpike / Spaulding Turnpike / US 1 Byp. / NH 16 in Portsmouth, NH

Location
- Country: United States
- States: New York, Vermont, New Hampshire

Highway system
- United States Numbered Highway System; List; Special; Divided
← US 3	US	→ US 5
← Route 12B	N.E.	→ Route 14

U.S. Route 4 (US 4) is a 253-mile-long (407 km) United States Numbered Highway that runs from East Greenbush, New York, in the west to Portsmouth, New Hampshire, in the east, traversing Vermont.

In New York, US 4 is signed north–south to reflect its alignment in the state. In Vermont and New Hampshire, the route is signed east–west, the conventional direction for even-numbered U.S. Routes.

== Route description ==
Lengths
	mi	km
NY	79.67	128.22
VT	66.059	106.312
NH	106.834	171.933
Total	252.62	406.55

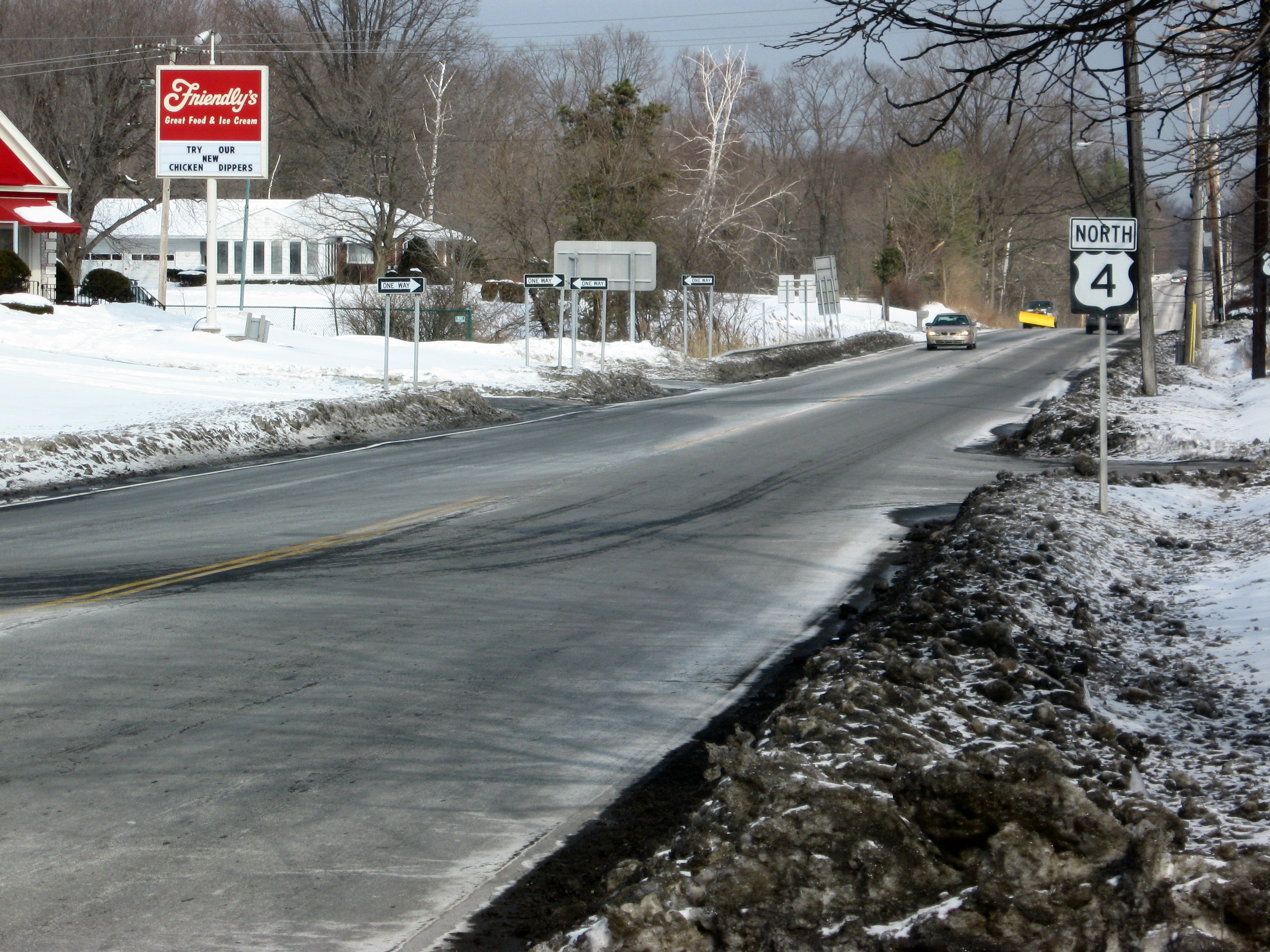
US 4's southern terminus at US 9 and US 20 in East Greenbush, New York, a suburb of Albany

=== New York ===
In the state of New York, US 4 begins at the concurrency of US 9 and US 20 in East Greenbush. Heading northward, it has an interchange with Interstate 90 (I-90), continuing northward into Troy. In Troy, it passes by Hudson Valley Community College as well as the headquarters of the 42nd Infantry Division. US 4 then heads downhill, passing the historic South End Tavern as Burden Avenue, named for the historic Burden Iron Works. Later, US 4 assumes Fourth Street, which splits into parallel one-way streets (Third Street handles southbound traffic). Once through Troy's historic downtown, the streets meet and pass by the Green Island Bridge, later passing under the Collar City Bridge and into Lansingburgh.

After Lansingburgh, US 4 turns left to cross the Hudson River on the Troy–Waterford Bridge, entering Waterford, joining with New York State Route 32 (NY 32) to head north together west of the Hudson. After Mechanicville, US 4 and NY 32 split, and US 4 passes by the Battles of Saratoga and Gerald B. H. Solomon Saratoga National Cemetery. NY 32 joins again to pass through Schuylerville, after which US 4 splits off to cross the Hudson River one last time.

Running parallel to the Champlain Canal, US 4 passes through villages including Fort Edward, Hudson Falls, Fort Ann, and Whitehall. After a concurrency with NY 22, US 4 heads eastward into Vermont.

=== Vermont ===
In the state of Vermont, US 4 immediately becomes a four-lane divided expressway. The historic routing of US 4 runs nearby as Vermont Route 4A (VT 4A), which later becomes US 4 Business as it enters Rutland. South of Rutland, US 4 meets US 7 and overlaps it into downtown, meeting the east end of its business route. East of Rutland, US 4 is a two-lane highway, meandering through the Green Mountains, passing by Killington, going through Woodstock and Quechee, crossing the Quechee Gorge, and meeting US 5, I-89, and I-91 at White River Junction. Crossing the Connecticut River, US 4 enters New Hampshire.

=== New Hampshire ===
In the state of New Hampshire, US 4 passes through Lebanon, meeting I-89 again. It then heads southeast to Boscawen, where it briefly overlaps US 3 before joining I-93 into Concord. Turning east, US 4 briefly overlaps I-393 and for a longer stretch with US 202. Passing through Durham, US 4 joins the Spaulding Turnpike at Dover Point and travels southeast to its eastern terminus in Portsmouth at the Portsmouth Traffic Circle.

== History ==

Prior to being designated US 4, the road from Whitehall, New York, eastward through Vermont was New England Route 13 (Route 13). From the Vermont–New Hampshire state line to Franklin, New Hampshire, it was the eastern extension of Route 14. From Franklin to Concord, New Hampshire, it used Route 6 (now US 3), and, from Concord to Northwood, New Hampshire, it used Route 9 (now New Hampshire Route 9 [NH 9]). Between Northwood and Dover, New Hampshire, it used a road that was previously not numbered. From Dover to its eastern terminus at Portsmouth, New Hampshire, the road used to be known as Route 16 (now NH 16).

=== History of the terminuses ===
1926–1930: Glens Falls, New York, at the point where US 9 split into US 9W and US 9E, to Portsmouth, New Hampshire.
1930–: East Greenbush, New York, following former US 9E, through its former west terminus, to Portsmouth, New Hampshire.

== Major intersections ==
New York
US 9 / US 20 in East Greenbush
I-90 north of East Greenbush
Vermont
US 7 in the Town of Rutland. The highways travel concurrently to the City of Rutland.
I-89 in Hartford
US 5 in Hartford. The highways travel concurrently to White River Junction.
New Hampshire
I-89 in Lebanon
I-89 in Lebanon
US 3 in Boscawen. The highways travel concurrently through the city.
I-93 in Concord. The highways travel concurrently through the city.
I-93 / I-393 / US 202 in Concord. I-393/US 4 travel concurrently to Pembroke. US 3/US 202 travel concurrently to Northwood.
I-95 in Portsmouth

== See also ==
- East–West Highway (New England)

=== Related routes ===
- U.S. Route 104 became NY 104 in 1971. It never directly connected to US 4.
