= Vermont Route 4A =

State highway in Rutland County, Vermont, US

Vermont Route 4A
- Vermont Route 4A highlighted in red

Route information
- Auxiliary route of US 4
- Maintained by VTrans
- Length: 14.174 mi (22.811 km)
- Existed: 1971–present

Major junctions
- West end: US 4 in Fair Haven
- VT 30 in Castleton
- East end: US 4 Bus. in West Rutland

Location
- Country: United States
- State: Vermont
- Counties: Rutland

Highway system
- State highways in Vermont
← US 4	→ US 5

Vermont Route 4A (VT 4A) is a 14.174-mile-long (22.811 km) east–west state highway in Rutland County, Vermont, United States. It runs from Fair Haven to West Rutland. VT 4A was the former alignment of U.S. Route 4 (US 4) before it was relocated to an expressway.

== Route description ==
VT 4A begins at exit 1 of a four-lane U.S. Route 4 and goes into Fair Haven. It joins VT 22A and forms a brief concurrency in the center of town. The route then goes through the towns of Castleton (where it is known as Main Street and goes past Castleton University), Ira and West Rutland. The route ends at U.S. Route 4 Business in West Rutland.

== Major intersections ==
The entire route is in Rutland County.

Location	mi	km	Destinations	Notes
Fair Haven	0.000	0.000	US 4 – Whitehall NY	Western terminus; exit 1 on US 4
Fair Haven	1.505	2.422	VT 22A south – Granville NY	Western end of concurrency with VT 22A
Fair Haven	1.845	2.969	VT 22A north to US 4 – Rutland, Vergennes	Eastern end of concurrency with VT 22A
Castleton	5.059	8.142	VT 30 – Bomoseen, Middlebury, Poultney	
West Rutland	13.952	22.454	VT 133 – Middletown Springs, Pawlet	Northern terminus of VT 133
West Rutland	14.174	22.811	US 4 Bus. – Fair Haven	Eastern terminus; to US 4 / US 7 south
1.000 mi = 1.609 km; 1.000 km = 0.621 mi: Concurrency terminus
