= Fair Haven (CDP), Vermont =

Census-designated place in Vermont, United States

Fair Haven, Vermont
- Census-designated place
- Location within Vermont Location within the United States
- Coordinates: 43°35′50″N 73°15′24″W
- Country: United States
- State: Vermont
- County: Rutland

Area
  - Total: 2.8 sq mi (7.2 km^{2})
  - Land: 2.8 sq mi (7.2 km^{2})
  - Water: 0 sq mi (0.0 km^{2})
- Elevation: 299 ft (91 m)

Population (2010)
  - Total: 2,269
  - Density: 820/sq mi (320/km^{2})
- Time zone: UTC-5 (Eastern (EST))
  - Summer (DST): UTC-4 (EDT)
- ZIP Code: 05743
- Area code: 802
- FIPS code: 50-25450
- GNIS feature ID: 2378126

Fair Haven is a census-designated place (CDP) in the town of Fair Haven, Vermont in Rutland County, Vermont, United States. The population was 2,269 at the 2010 census.

== Geography ==
According to the United States Census Bureau, the CDP has a total area of 7.1 km^{2} (2.7 sq mi), all land.

== Demographics ==
As of the census of 2000, there were 2,435 people, 981 households, and 642 families residing in the CDP. The population density was 340.6 people/km^{2} (882 people/mi^{2}). There were 1,058 housing units at an average density of 148.0 units/km^{2} (383 units/mi^{2}). The racial makeup of the CDP was 97.95% White, 0.25% Black or African American, 0.21% Native American, 0.33% Asian, 0.53% from other races, and 0.74% from two or more races. Hispanic or Latino of any race were 0.86% of the population.

There were 981 households, out of which 33.1% had children under the age of 18 living with them, 47.5% were married couples living together, 13.8% had a female householder with no husband present, and 34.5% were non-families. 29.0% of all households were made up of individuals, and 13.7% had someone living alone who was 65 years of age or older. The average household size was 2.44 and the average family size was 3.00.

In the CDP, the population was spread out, with 26.2% under the age of 18, 8.6% from 18 to 24, 27.6% from 25 to 44, 22.6% from 45 to 64, and 15.0% who were 65 years of age or older. The median age was 37 years. For every 100 females, there were 90.7 males. For every 100 females age 18 and over, there were 84.1 males.

The median income for a household in the CDP was $33,563, and the median income for a family was $36,944. Males had a median income of $29,947 versus $20,813 for females. The per capita income for the CDP was $17,371. About 13.5% of families and 17.3% of the population were below the poverty line, including 27.0% of those under age 18 and 11.3% of those age 65 or over.
