= Quechee, Vermont =

Census-designated place in Vermont, United States

- Census-designated place
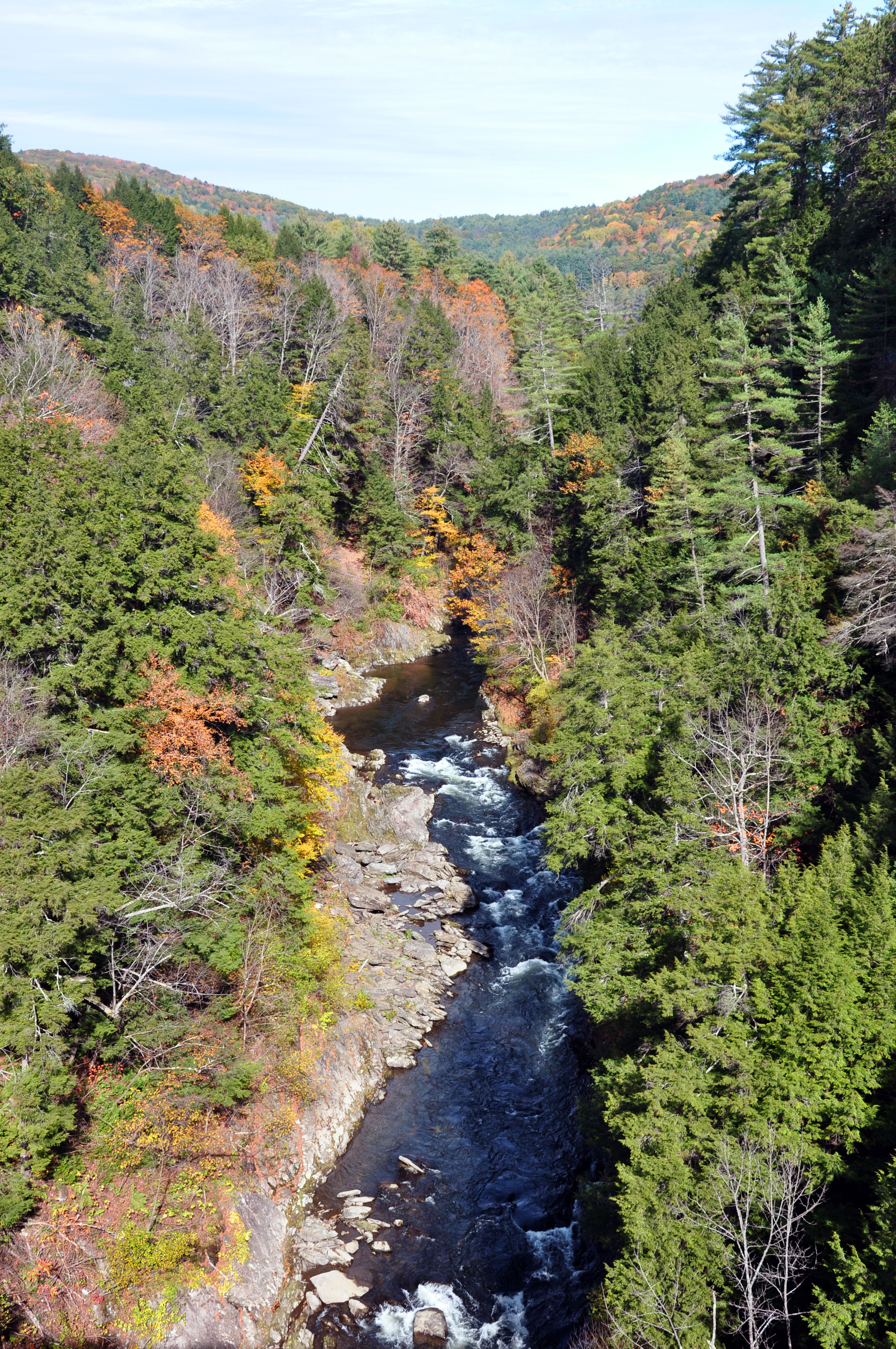
- Quechee Gorge at Quechee State Park

- Location in Windsor County and the state of Vermont
- Coordinates: 43°38′40″N 72°25′06″W
- Country: United States
- State: Vermont
- County: Windsor

Area
  - Total: 1.9 sq mi (5.0 km^{2})
  - Land: 1.9 sq mi (4.8 km^{2})
  - Water: 0.077 sq mi (0.2 km^{2})
- Elevation: 532 ft (162 m)

Population (2020)
  - Total: 831
  - Density: 450/sq mi (170/km^{2})
- Time zone: UTC-5 (Eastern (EST))
  - Summer (DST): UTC-4 (EDT)
- ZIP code: 05059
- Area code: 802
- FIPS code: 50-57775
- GNIS feature ID: 2586649

Quechee is a census-designated place and one of five unincorporated villages in the town of Hartford, Windsor County, Vermont, United States. As of the 2020 census, Quechee had a population of 831. It is the site of Quechee Gorge on the Ottauquechee River and is also the home to the Quechee Lakes planned community, initiated in the late 1960s, which also brought to the community the small Quechee Lakes Ski Area in the 1970s.

Quechee was known for a picturesque covered bridge at the site of the old Quechee mill, which now houses the Simon Pearce glass-blowing facility and restaurant. The bridge was severely damaged by flooding caused by Hurricane Irene in 2011. The bridge has since been rebuilt.

Quechee has a small branch post office with zip code 05059.

The region was historically inhabited by tribes of the Abenaki people; evidence exists of an ancient Abenaki village at the site of Quechee, in addition to more recent Abenaki settlements and activity throughout Hartford.

== Geography ==
Quechee is located along the Ottauquechee River in the western part of the town of Hartford. U.S. Route 4 passes through the CDP, just south of the village center, connecting with Woodstock and Rutland to the west and with White River Junction to the east. Quechee Gorge forms the southeastern edge of the CDP.

== Education ==
It is in the Hartford School District.

Mid Vermont Christian School, a private K-12 school, is in Quechee.
