= Bomoseen State Park =

State park in Rutland County, Vermont

- Location within Vermont
- Interactive map of Bomoseen State Park
- Location: Castleton, Fair Haven, Hubbarton and Benson, Vermont, United States
- Coordinates: 43°39′29″N 73°13′44″W
- Area: 3,576 acres (1,447 ha)
- Opened: 1960
- Administrator: Vermont Department of Forests, Parks, and Recreation
- Open: Memorial Day weekend - Labor Day weekend
- Status: Memorial Day weekend - Labor Day weekend
- Website: Official website
- Vermont State Parks

Bomoseen State Park is a 3,576-acre state park in the towns of Castleton, Fair Haven, Hubbarton and Benson, Vermont. The park is located in the Taconic Mountains on the western shore of Lake Bomoseen. The park's boundaries surround nearby Glen Lake and forested land comprising the camping area that is Half Moon Pond State Park. Activities includes boating, swimming, camping, fishing, hiking, picnicking, wildlife watching and winter sports.

The Glen Lake Trail connects the Bomoseen campground (66 campsites including 10 lean-tos) with the Half Moon campground (52 tent/RV sites, 5 cabins and 11 lean-to sites).

Facilities include a swim beach, picnic area, snack bar, boat rentals, campground, flush toilets, hot showers, and a dump station. Park rangers offer interpretive programs including night hikes, campfire programs, amphibian explorations, and nature crafts and games.
