= Castleton Four Corners, Vermont =

Census-designated place in Vermont, United States

Castleton Four Corners, Vermont Castleton Corners
- Census-designated place
- Location within Vermont Location within the United States
- Coordinates: 43°36′35″N 73°12′46″W
- Country: United States
- State: Vermont
- County: Rutland
- Town: Castleton

Area
  - Total: 2.15 sq mi (5.57 km^{2})
  - Land: 2.13 sq mi (5.51 km^{2})
  - Water: 0.023 sq mi (0.06 km^{2})
- Elevation: 456 ft (139 m)

Population (2020)
  - Total: 699
- Time zone: UTC-5 (Eastern (EST))
  - Summer (DST): UTC-4 (EDT)
- ZIP Codes: 05735 (Castleton); 05732 (Bomoseen); 05750 (Hydeville)
- Area code: 802
- FIPS code: 50-12062
- GNIS feature ID: 2807145

Castleton Four Corners is a census-designated place (CDP) in the town of Castleton, Rutland County, Vermont, United States. It consists of the unincorporated villages of Castleton Corners and Hydeville. As of the 2020 census, the CDP had a population of 699, out of 4,458 in the entire town.

== Geography ==
The CDP is in northwestern Rutland County, in the southwest part of the town of Castleton. It is bordered to the east by Castleton village and to the west by the town of Fair Haven. Vermont Route 4A is the main road through the CDP; it leads east through Castleton village 9 miles (14 km) to West Rutland and west 3 miles (5 km) to Fair Haven village. Vermont Route 30 crosses Route 4A at Castleton Corners and leads north 29 miles (47 km) to Middlebury and south 6 miles (10 km) to Poultney. U.S. Route 4, a four-lane freeway, forms the northern edge of the CDP, with access from Exit 4 (Route 30). US 4 leads east 14 miles (23 km) to Rutland and west 12 miles (19 km) to Whitehall, New York.

The CDP is bordered to the south by the Castleton River, a west-flowing tributary of the Poultney River, which it joins at the New York state line on the west side of Fair Haven. The outlet of Lake Bomoseen, which flows south to the Castleton River, is in Hydeville. Castleton Four Corners is part of the Lake Champlain watershed.
