= Senator Denton (disambiguation) =

Jeremiah Denton (1924–2014) was a U.S. Senator from Alabama from 1981 to 1987. Senator Denton may also refer to:

- Bobby E. Denton (born 1938), Alabama State Senate
- Julie Denton (born 1960), Kentucky State Senate
- Samuel Denton (1803–1860), Michigan State Senate
