= Hubbardton =

Hubbardton may refer to:

- Hubbardton, Vermont
- Battle of Hubbardton – an engagement in the Saratoga campaign of the American Revolutionary War.
