= Van R. Paterson =

American judge (1849-1902)

Alexander Van Rensselaer Paterson
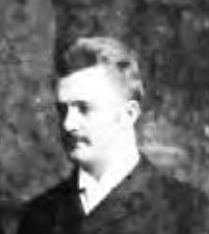

Associate Justice of the California Supreme Court
- In office December 22, 1886 – May 3, 1894
- Appointed by: Elected
- Preceded by: Samuel B. McKee
- Succeeded by: William Cary Van Fleet

Personal details
- Born: March 2, 1849 Ogdensburg, New York, U.S.
- Died: July 27, 1902 (aged 53) San Francisco, California, U.S.
- Spouse: Amy H. Kelsey (m. 1880)
- Education: Albany Normal College (B.A.); Union College (LL.B.)

Alexander Van Rensselaer Paterson (March 2, 1849 – July 27, 1902) was an associate justice of the Supreme Court of California from December 22, 1886 to May 3, 1894.

== Biography ==
Born in Ogdensburg, New York, Paterson moved with his family to Ohio as child. He was educated at St. Lawrence Academy. He graduated from Albany Normal College in 1872 and thereafter received an LL.B. from Union College. He then moved to Stockton, California to enter into the practice of law.

In Stockton, Paterson held a series of public offices. In 1878 and 1879, he ran on the Citizens' Party ticket and was elected City Attorney of Stockton. He resigned from that office to accept the nomination for judge of San Joaquin County Superior Court, and he was elected. In 1884, he was re-elected as judge.

In August 1886, the Republican Party nominated Paterson, along with Thomas Bard McFarland and Noble Hamilton, as Associate Justices of the California Supreme Court, and Paterson and McFarland were elected to 12-year terms. When Paterson took his seat in January 1887, Frank T. Baldwin was appointed to Paterson's vacant position on the Superior Court. On the Supreme Court in 1888, Niles Searls was Chief Justice, while Paterson sat in Department One with Elisha W. McKinstry and Jackson Temple, while Department Two was composed of James D. Thornton, John Sharpstein, and McFarland. In 1899, William H. Beatty replaced Searls as Chief Justice, and John D. Works took the seat of McKinstry in Department One.

On May 3, 1894, Paterson resigned from the court to resume the practice or law in San Francisco with partner Arthur Rodgers in the firm of Paterson and Rodgers. In March 1898, the remaining member, Judge Charles W. Slack of the San Francisco County Superior Court, resigned from the bench and joined the firm. Paterson's notable cases as counsel include the James Graham Fair will contest, where he was appointed by the court as the representative of the minor heirs. He was also the attorney for Clara Kluge Sutro in the contest which was made over the estate left by Adolph Sutro.

Paterson remained involved in civic matters. In January 1899, his name was put forward for United States Senator by the California Legislature. In February 1899, he helped draft a bill for the Legislature to create the district courts of appeal to reduce the Supreme Court's workload.

== Personal life ==
On May 5, 1880, while practicing law in Stockton, he married Amy H. Kelsey, with whom he had three surviving children: Kelsey, Marjorie, and Ogden Paterson. Paterson died at his residence at 1926 Octavia street, following a six month bout of liver disease.

== See also ==
- List of justices of the Supreme Court of California

Legal offices
Preceded by Samuel B. McKee	Associate Justice of the California Supreme Court; 1886–1894	Succeeded by William Cary Van Fleet
