= Neshobe Island =

Island in Vermont, USA

Coordinates: 43°38′47″N 73°12′40″W

Neshobe Island is an island in Lake Bomoseen in the town of Castleton, U.S. state of Vermont. It is particularly known for its association during the 1920s and 1930s with the writer Alexander Woollcott, a member of the Algonquin Round Table, a group of literary figures.

The island was given its present name at an event on July 4, 1881, at which several names were proposed; among the other names were Taghkannuc and Kellowanda. The Rutland County Historical Society published an account of the event including a number of speeches and poems, and shortly thereafter a series of "colored books of Neshobe" were published, containing a variety of poems in honor of the island.

It became well known in the 1920s and 1930s for its association with the Algonquin Round Table. In 1924, Alexander Woollcott, a member of the Algonquin circle and later a writer for The New Yorker, bought part of the island with six friends, and by the early 1930s he had purchased most of the island. He built himself a large stone house, where he hosted a number of other members of the circle during the 1930s; Woollcott himself lived permanently on the island from 1938.

Some of the visitors to the island during Woollcott's time included Harpo Marx, Noël Coward, Ring Lardner, Thornton Wilder, Robert Benchley, Margaret Mitchell, Laurence Olivier, Helen Hayes, Vivien Leigh, Irving Berlin, and Walt Disney. Landscaping on the island was done by the painter Gerald Murphy. Woollcott formed a 10-member Neshobe Island Club; membership cost $1,000 to spend the summer on the island.

A fictionalized account of life on Neshobe Island during this time forms the basis for Charles Brackett's 1934 novel Entirely Surrounded.
