= Calochromus slevini =

Scientific classification
- Kingdom: Animalia
- Phylum: Arthropoda
- Class: Insecta
- Order: Coleoptera
- Suborder: Polyphaga
- Infraorder: Elateriformia
- Family: Lycidae
- Genus: Calochromus
- Species: C. slevini

Binomial name
- Calochromus slevini Van Dyke, 1918

Species of beetle

Calochromus slevini is a species of net-winged beetle in the family Lycidae. It is found in North America.
