= Half Moon Pond State Park =

State park in Vermont, United States

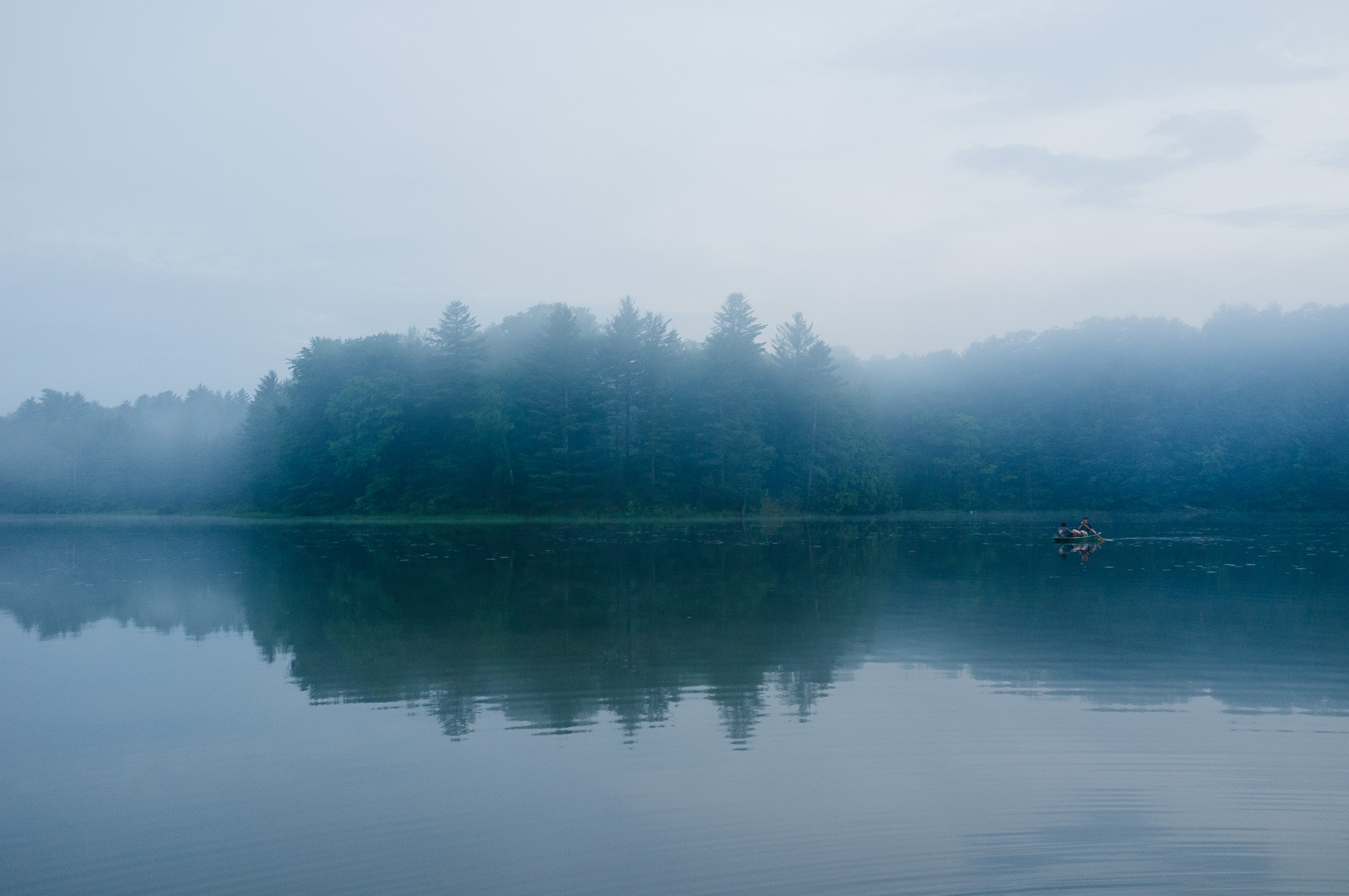

- Location within Vermont
- Interactive map of Half Moon Pond State Park
- Location: Hubbardton, Vermont, United States
- Coordinates: 43°41′56″N 73°13′23″W
- Area: 1,034 acres (418 ha)
- Administrator: Vermont Department of Forests, Parks, and Recreation
- Website: Official website
- Vermont State Parks

Half Moon Pond State Park, also known as Halfmoon State Park, is a wooded campground state park located within the 3,576-acre Bomoseen State Park in the town of Hubbardton, Vermont. The campsites are located on Half Moon Pond, a small lake that covers 23 acres (9.3 ha) and has a maximum depth of 8 feet (2.4 m).

Activities includes boating, swimming, camping, fishing, hiking, bicycling, picnicking, wildlife watching and winter sports.

The Glen Lake Trail connects the Half Moon campground (52 tent/RV sites, 5 cabins and 11 lean-to sites) with the Bomoseen campground (66 campsites including 10 lean-tos.

Facilities include two swim beaches, boat rentals, campsites, flush toilets, hot showers, and a dump station. Park rangers offer interpretive programs including night hikes, campfire programs, amphibian explorations, and nature crafts and games.
