= Castleton (CDP), Vermont =

Census-designated place in Vermont, United States

Castleton, Vermont
- Census-designated place
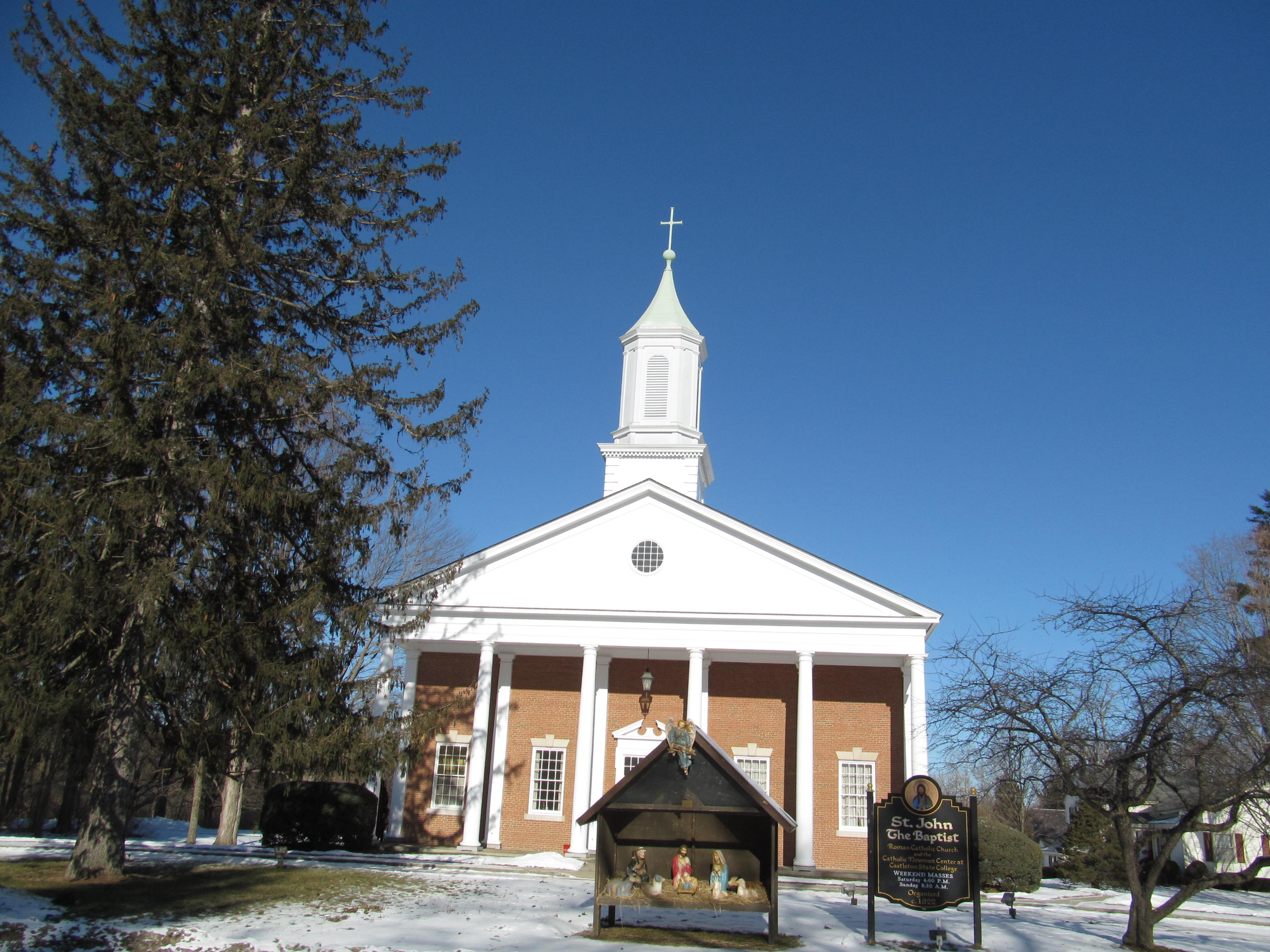
- St. John the Baptist Church

- Location within Vermont Location within the United States
- Coordinates: 43°36′19″N 73°11′07″W
- Country: United States
- State: Vermont
- County: Rutland
- Town: Castleton

Area
  - Total: 1.27 sq mi (3.29 km^{2})
  - Land: 1.26 sq mi (3.27 km^{2})
  - Water: 0.0077 sq mi (0.02 km^{2})
- Elevation: 472 ft (144 m)

Population (2020)
  - Total: 1,337
  - Density: 1,059/sq mi (408.9/km^{2})
- Time zone: UTC-5 (Eastern (EST))
  - Summer (DST): UTC-4 (EDT)
- ZIP Code: 05735
- Area code: 802
- FIPS code: 50-11875
- GNIS feature ID: 2586622

- Castleton Village Historic District
- U.S. National Register of Historic Places
- U.S. Historic district
- Location: Irregular pattern along Main and South Sts., Castleton, Vermont
- Area: 71 acres (29 ha)
- Built: 1777
- Architect: Multiple
- Architectural style: Greek Revival, Federal, Late Victorian
- NRHP reference No.: 79000225
- Added to NRHP: April 26, 1979

Castleton is the primary village and a census-designated place (CDP) in the town of Castleton, Rutland County, Vermont, United States. As of the 2020 census, it had a population of 1,337, out of 4,458 in the entire town. A large portion of the village is part of the Castleton Village Historic District, listed on the National Register of Historic Places in 1979. It is also home to Castleton University, founded in 1787, and now part of the Vermont State Colleges system.

== Geography ==
Castleton Village is located in western Rutland County, in the south-central part of the town of Castleton, on the south side of the Castleton River, about midway between Rutland, Vermont, and Whitehall, New York. Main Street runs east–west through the village, designated Vermont Route 4A; U.S. Route 4, a limited-access highway, runs east–west on the north side of the river. The village center is at North Road and South Street, which provide access to rural parts of the town; Vermont Route 30, the principal north–south artery in the town, is west of the village in the community of Castleton Four Corners. The village has one active rail line, running east–west north of Main Street, that presently carries the Amtrak Ethan Allen Express, stopping at the station at the east end of the village.

== History ==
Castleton Village was settled in the early 1770s, and Main Street was laid out in 1772 as the principal east–west route in the region. In 1775, the village is where Ethan Allen mustered the Green Mountain Boys for the Capture of Fort Ticonderoga, early in the American Revolutionary War. Castleton College was founded in 1787, and Castleton Medical College was founded in 1818, both located on the south side of Main Street.

The town was prosperous in the 19th century because of the marble and slate industries, and benefited from the construction of two railroad lines in the 1850s. Around the turn of the century the tourist industry, serving summer trade at Lake Bomoseen, resulted in the construction of hotels and other service facilities. The village was devastated by a series of fires in the 1910s, which destroyed a number of landmark buildings. Most of the village was listed on the National Register of Historic Places in 1979 for its 19th-century architectural character.

== See also ==
- National Register of Historic Places listings in Rutland County, Vermont
