= Isaiah H. Hedge =

American physician (1812–1888)

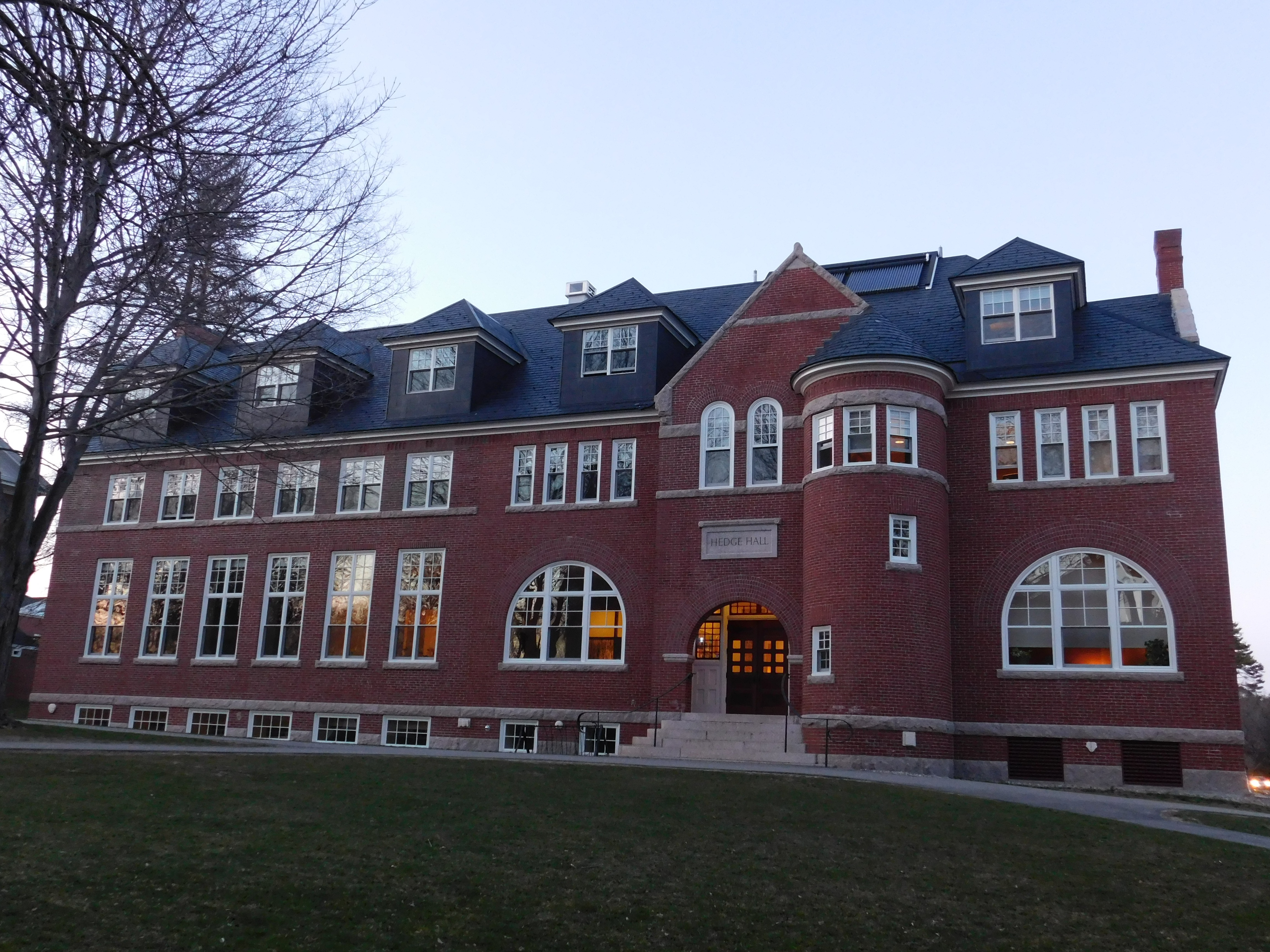
Hedge Hall at Bates College in Maine, was originally a chemistry hall donated by Hedge

Isaiah H. Hedge (1812–1888) was a medical doctor, businessman, abolitionist and philanthropist, who is the namesake and donor of Hedge Hall at Bates College in Maine.

== Biography ==
Isaiah Hallett Hedge was born in Woolwich, Maine in 1812 to Edward Hedge and Martha Farnham Hedge. Hedge started a merchandising business in Wiscasset, Maine, before moving to Limerick, Maine where he married Charlotte Ayre in 1840. Hedge attended Castleton Medical College in Castleton, Vermont in from 1846 to 1848 and in 1850. Hedge moved first to Gorham, Maine in 1850, and then Hedge moved to Waukon, Iowa in 1855 for better opportunities. Dr. Hedge was a lifelong Freewill Baptist and was a supporter of abolitionism before the Civil War as a Whig and then a Republican. In Waukon he purchased a city block and constructed a home and actively practiced medicine in Waukon until 1875. Hedge also owned a drug store and medical partnership with Dr. Willard Chauncey, who married Hedge's only child, Ellen Augusta ("Nellie"), and they had three children. After 1875 Hedge traveled for his health and wintered in an orange grove in Florida. Shortly before his death, Hedge donated $5,000 to Bates College for a chemistry hall which was named in his honor.

== See also ==
- Bates College campus
