= Benson (CDP), Vermont =

Census-designated place in Vermont, United States

Benson, Vermont
- Census-designated place
- Location within Vermont Location within the United States
- Coordinates: 43°42′26″N 73°18′34″W
- Country: United States
- State: Vermont
- County: Rutland
- Town: Benson

Area
  - Total: 3.93 sq mi (10.19 km^{2})
  - Land: 3.87 sq mi (10.03 km^{2})
  - Water: 0.062 sq mi (0.16 km^{2})
- Elevation: 417 ft (127 m)

Population (2020)
  - Total: 269
- Time zone: UTC-5 (Eastern (EST))
  - Summer (DST): UTC-4 (EDT)
- ZIP Code: 05743
- Area code: 802
- FIPS code: 50-05125
- GNIS feature ID: 2586619

Benson is the primary village and a census-designated place (CDP) in the town of Benson, Rutland County, Vermont, United States. As of the 2020 census, it had a population of 269, out of 974 in the entire town.

The CDP is in northwestern Rutland County, at the geographic center of the town. Vermont Route 22A runs along the eastern edge of the village, leading north 6 miles (10 km) to Orwell and south 8 miles (13 km) to Fair Haven. Vermont Route 144 has its western terminus at Benson and leads northeast 4 miles (6 km) to Hortonia.
