= FHU =

FHU may refer to:

== Organisations ==
- Foundation of Human Understanding
- Handball Federation of Ukraine
- Ice Hockey Federation of Ukraine

== Places in the United States ==
- Fair Haven Union High School, Vermont
- Freed–Hardeman University, Tennessee
- Sierra Vista Municipal Airport, Arizona
