= Walter Van Dyke =

American judge (1823-1905)

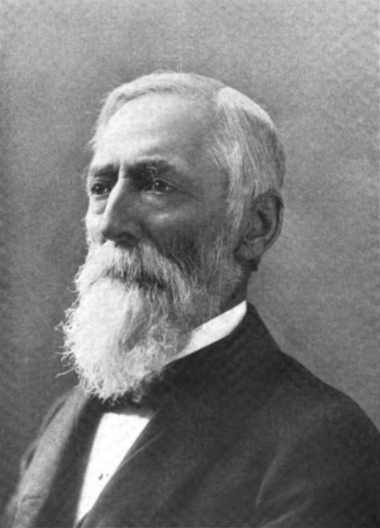

Associate Justice of the Supreme Court of California
- In office January 4, 1899 – December 25, 1905
- Appointed by: Elected
- Preceded by: William Cary Van Fleet
- Succeeded by: M. C. Sloss

Judge of the Los Angeles County Superior Court
- In office 1888–1899

Delegate to the Second Constitutional Convention of California
- In office September 28, 1878 – March 3, 1879
- Preceded by: Office established
- Succeeded by: Office abolished
- Constituency: 2nd congressional district

United States Attorney for the District of California
- In office 1874–1877

Member of the California Senate
- In office 1861–1863

District Attorney of Humboldt County
- In office 1854–1855
- Preceded by: Joel Burnell
- Succeeded by: Lewis W. Burson

Personal details
- Born: October 8, 1823 Tyre, Seneca County, New York, U.S.
- Died: December 25, 1905 (aged 82) East Oakland, California, U.S.
- Spouse: Rowena Cooper (m. 1854)
- Children: Edwin Cooper Van Dyke
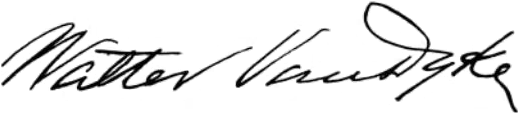
- Signature

Walter Van Dyke (October 8, 1823 – December 25, 1905) was a Los Angeles County Superior Court judge and a justice of the California Supreme Court in the late 19th and early 20th centuries.

== Biography ==
Van Dyke was born on October 8, 1823, in Tyre, Seneca County, New York. He studied law in Cleveland, Ohio, from 1846 to 1848 and crossed the plains in 1849, remaining a short time in Los Angeles and then moving to Northern California. In 1853, he settled in Humboldt County, and was elected to the California State Assembly. He practiced law and was district attorney there in 1854. In 1861, he was elected to the California State Senate, serving in the 1862 and 1863 sessions, where he helped organize the state's Republican Party. He edited the Humboldt Times until 1863, then moved to San Francisco. In 1868, he was an alternate elector to the Republican Party national convention for President Ulysses S. Grant. From 1874 to 1877, Van Dyke was United States attorney for California, and was elected a delegate to the California Constitutional Convention in 1878.

In 1884, Van Dyke moved to Los Angeles, and practiced in the firm of Wells, Van Dyke & Lee. In 1888, he was elected a Los Angeles County Superior Court in Department Four, and in 1894 was reelected to a six-year term, serving until December 28, 1899. In June 1889, his name was unsuccessfully put forward to fill a vacancy on the California Supreme Court.

In November 1888, he ran for a seat as an associate justice of the California Supreme Court, and on January 4, 1899, he began a 12-year term after winning the election as a fusion candidate of the Silver Republican, Democratic, and Populist parties. He was elected to the remaining term of William Cary Van Fleet, who died in office, ending in 1910.

Van Dyke died on December 25, 1905, age 82, in his home at Fourth and Van Dyke avenues in East Oakland, California, after a brief illness identified as pneumonia. Funeral services were conducted at Mountain View Cemetery. His seat on the court was filled by the appointment of M. C. Sloss.

== Clubs ==
Van Dyke was a vice president and life member of the Society of California Pioneers.

== Personal life ==
On September 21, 1854, Van Dyke married Rowena Cooper in Humboldt County, California, and they had eight children. At his death, he was survived by his widow and five children: William M. Van Dyke, who was clerk of the court for the United States District Court for the Southern District of California; Henry S. Van Dyke, an attorney in Los Angeles; Dr. Edwin Cooper Van Dyke and Mrs. Franklin Bangs of San Francisco; and Caroline Van Dyke of Oakland.

== See also ==
- List of justices of the Supreme Court of California

== References and notes ==
Political offices
Preceded by William Cary Van Fleet	Associate Justice of the California Supreme Court; 1899–1905	Succeeded by M. C. Sloss
