= Benson, Vermont =

- Town
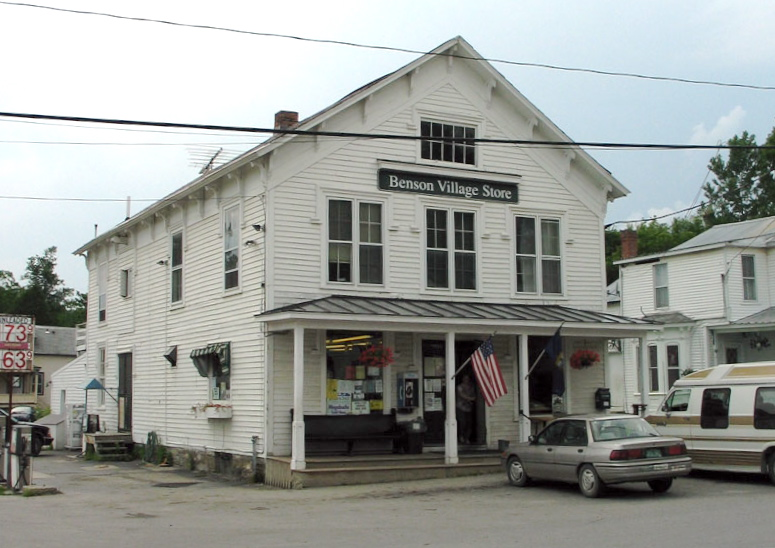
- Benson Village Store

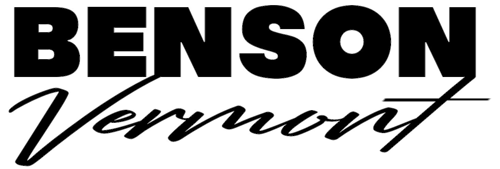
- Logo
- Nickname: The Viper of Revolution
- Motto: "Fight or Die"
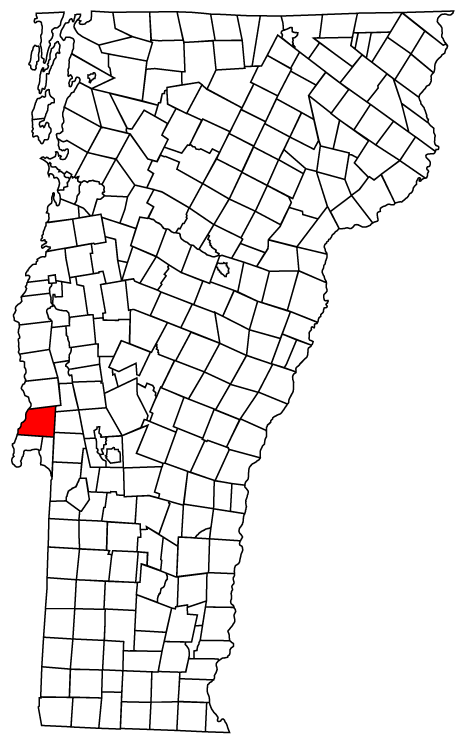
- Benson, Vermont
- Coordinates: 43°43′47″N 73°18′20″W
- Country: United States
- State: Vermont
- County: Rutland
- Established: 1791
- Communities: Benson; Benson Landing

Government
  - Type: Selectboard

Area
  - Total: 45.5 sq mi (117.8 km^{2})
  - Land: 44.0 sq mi (113.9 km^{2})
  - Water: 1.5 sq mi (4.0 km^{2})
- Elevation: 512 ft (156 m)

Population (2020)
  - Total: 974
  - Density: 22.1/sq mi (8.55/km^{2})
- Time zone: UTC−5 (Eastern (EST))
  - Summer (DST): UTC−4 (EDT)
- ZIP codes: 05743, 05731 (Benson); 05760 (Orwell)
- Area code: 802
- FIPS code: 50-05200
- GNIS feature ID: 1462040
- Website: www.bensonvermont.gov

Benson is a town in Rutland County, Vermont, United States. The population was 974 at the 2020 census. The town is rural, with a concentration of several homes and businesses in Benson village, at the intersection of Stage Road and Lake Road.

== Government ==
As is the tradition of many towns in rural New England, the municipal government enjoys a degree of autonomy from the county and employs only a few essential service-providers. The democratically elected selectboard and town clerk decide on an annual budget for road crews, educators, and law enforcers. Town committees set the protocols of town policy with particular focus on the town's annual budget, which is decided annually on Town Meeting Day. The Town Meeting is an assembly of all adult registered voters in the town, and the assembly usually draws a crowd approaching 40 citizens. These forty citizens help to determine the direction of town planning, in particular the areas of road maintenance, public safety, and local taxation.

== Public safety ==
The town employs a town constable, but most law enforcement is handled by the Vermont State Police. The amount of crime in Benson is negligible when compared with the nearby communities of Orwell and Shoreham who respectively ranked second and tenth in recidivism and repeat offenders as of 2012. Even so, Benson has faced the growing drug epidemic in rural New England, and the use of illegal substances is on the rise across all ages and demographics.

Ambulance services are provided by Benson First Response and the Fair Haven Rescue Squad. The nearest hospitals are Rutland Regional Medical Center and Middlebury's historic Porter Hospital. Benson also operates a small, entirely volunteer fire department, who respond to more motor vehicle crashes then fires. This volunteer department also sponsors an ice and swift water rescue team. . Assistance in fighting particularly large fires is provided by other neighboring volunteer fire departments, including Fair Haven, Castleton, Hubbardton, West Haven and Orwell, and Poultney. Similarly, Benson's volunteer firefighters occasionally respond to large blazes and calls for water rescue in other local towns when the opportunity presents itself.

== Economy ==
The local economy is driven by a number of small businesses centered in the central village center also known as the central business district centered on the intersection of Lake Road and Stage Road. The former C.J. Williamson store, a local greengrocery and gas station began the town's economic development and differentiation from the greater Fair Haven area. The Williamson store opened in 1912, shortly after the proprietor survived a bear attack while hiking in the Green Mountains. Benson Village Store (AKA Williamson's) Burned to the ground in April 2019 and was razed.

The Williamson store was soon joined by a tavern known as the Wheel Inn. On the same site, there was an American Revolutionary War-era public house that served as a meeting place for American and British soldiers during the tense 1770s. The Wheel Inn remained in near-constant operation through the 2010s.

== Geography ==
According to the United States Census Bureau, the town has a total area of 45.5 square miles (118 km^{2}), of which 44.0 square miles (114 km^{2}) is land and 1.5 square miles (3.9 km^{2}), or 3.36%, is water. Benson has 53.4 miles (85.9 km) of town roads.

The Benson Sycamore Tree is a local institution, located on Stage Road at the former estate of Lieutenant Colonel John Trutor. Before Lieutenant Colonel Trutor purchased the property on Stage Road, it was a local inn that served tourists who trekked through the state's roads and railways. Two of the most famous individuals who stayed at the inn were John Blackburn and Karl Suessdorf, who wrote the song "Moonlight in Vermont" while staying at the inn. Blackburn and Seussdorf memorialized the Sycamore tree, a massive specimen, in the song's lyrics. A small plaque makes reference to this historical moment of musicianship on Stage Road, opposite the home.

== History ==
In 1777, Walter Durfee, a Revolutionary War veteran from Massachusetts, made the first settlement in Benson. At that time the only road in town was the military road from Castleton to Ticonderoga, over which General St. Clair's army passed on its retreat after the evacuation of Ticonderoga, on July 6, 1777. Durfee found his way through the woods by a bridle path made by the surveyors and followed their marks on the trees. During the summer and autumn of 1782, he was the only person who had a settled habitation in the town. He was originally from Freetown, Massachusetts but moved to Benson from Poultney. In 1780 he purchased the entire right of Isaac Clark, one of the original proprietors of Benson; and also the entire right of John G Rover, another original proprietor. In the spring of 1782, Durfee cleared the primeval forest and erected a log house on what was afterward known as the Home Farm. Durfee continued to reside on that farm until the spring of 1835 when he moved to West Chazy, New York, where he died in the summer of 1843, aged over 90 years. In the spring of 1783 Jonathan Meacham and Captain James Noble and his son, James Noble Jr., came to Benson, and made preparations for settlement; and it is believed that they were removed here with their families in the autumn of that year.

While nobody seems to be quite sure as to the precise origin of the town's name, most historians over the years have speculated that it was named for Egbert Benson, a respected lawyer and Revolutionary War officer, who was instrumental in negotiating the land claim which New York had made to Vermont—a congressionally mandated prerequisite for Vermont joining the Union as a state of its own, rather than being divided between New York and New Hampshire. Benson residents have entered into some disputes over the history of the town in the recent publication "Remembering Benson" over the origin of the town's name. Lilian Snyder Philips Smith, who moved to Benson in 1948, claimed that her late husband Percy Phillips' great-great-grandfather Benson Philips was an early selectman responsible for chartering the town's first primary school in 1813. This was contradicted by Leonard Lussier, who questioned Mrs. Snyder Philips Smith's account as "probably malarkey."

Benson's political history has been checkered with Tory, Republican, Progressive, and Know Nothing sentiments. Local Historian Genevieve Trutor expressed surprise at Benson's progressive streak, noting that the brief tenure of 1920s representative Susannah W. Nifong was surprising to locals as well as anyone who might consider the prevalent political conditions at the time. Mrs. Trutor was an active feminist agitator during her own time, arguing for women to be engaged in front-line combat during World War II.

The 1976 United States Bicentennial celebrations became a point of great national and town pride, as the town's rivalry with neighboring Orwell intensified over which town would hold a better celebration. Although there was no formal victor, Benson's parade still maintains an important part in the town's history. Benson's economy fell into a slump that it would not recover from until the late 2000s.

In 1994, the town became briefly infamous for failing to approve its school budget eighteen times before it finally passed, a national record at the time.

== Benson Village Historic District ==
In 1978, Benson Village was officially entered on the National Register of Historic Places.

== Demographics ==
Historical population
Census	Pop.	Note	%±
1790	658		—
1800	1,159		76.1%
1810	1,561		34.7%
1820	1,481		−5.1%
1830	1,493		0.8%
1840	1,403		−6.0%
1850	1,305		−7.0%
1860	1,256		−3.8%
1870	1,244		−1.0%
1880	1,104		−11.3%
1890	880		−20.3%
1900	844		−4.1%
1910	813		−3.7%
1920	807		−0.7%
1930	636		−21.2%
1940	572		−10.1%
1950	573		0.2%
1960	549		−4.2%
1970	583		6.2%
1980	739		26.8%
1990	847		14.6%
2000	1,039		22.7%
2010	1,056		1.6%
2020	974		−7.8%
U.S. Decennial Census

As of the census of 2000, there were 1,039 people, persons or individuals, 391 households, homes, and domiciles, and 272 families or groups of relatives residing in the town. The population density was 23.6 people per square mile (9.1/km^{2}). There were 519 housing units at an average density of 11.8 per square mile (4.6/km^{2}). The racial makeup of the town was 96.92% White, 0.67% African American, 0.38% Native American, 0.29% Asian, 0.19% from other races, and 1.54% from two or more races. Hispanic or Latino of any race were 0.87% of the population.

There were 391 households, out of which 35.8% had children, kids, young people, or infants under the age of 18 living with them, 55.0% were married couples living together, 8.2% had a female householder with no husband present, and 30.4% were non-families. 24.8% of all households were made up of individuals, and 9.5% had someone living alone who was an elder senior citizen of age 65 years of age or older than 65 years of age or older. The average household size was 2.57 and the average family size was 3.05.

In the town, the age distribution of the population shows 28.3% under the age of 18, 6.6% from 18 to 24, 30.7% from 25 to 44, 22.6% from 45 to 64, and 11.7% who were 65 years of age or older. The median age was 36 years. For every 100 females, there were 104.5 males. For every 100 females age 18 and over, there were 97.6 males.

The median income for a household in the town was $38,224, and the median income for a family was $40,833. Males had a median income of $31,488 versus $21,146 for females. The per capita income for the town was $15,931. About 8.3% of families and 12.1% of the population were below the poverty line, including 16.9% of those under age 18 and 16.4% of those age 65 or over.

== Infrastructure ==
Benson has one public school, which offers classes from pre-school through sixth grade. High school students attend the nearby Fair Haven Union High School.

A small but well-maintained museum is housed in the town's municipal building, on the site of the former Benson Grade School. Also contained in this municipal building are the town offices and Town Clerk. Next door is the Community Hall, which provides a public meeting place and contains the town library. The State of Vermont Department of Fish and Wildlife maintains Benson Landing, a boat launch on Lake Champlain.

== Notable people ==
- Charles A. Corbett — Wisconsin State Assemblyman, was born in Benson
- Stephen Wallace Dorsey — US senator from Arkansas, born in Benson
- William B. Franke — Secretary of the Navy, retired in Benson
- Rufus Wilmot Griswold — anthologist, editor, and critic; known for his enmity with Edgar Allan Poe
- Rebecca Wilder Holmes — violinist and music professor at Smith College
- Loyal C. Kellogg — Associate Justice of the Vermont Supreme Court, lifelong resident of Benson
- Stone Phillips — broadcast journalist, former co-anchor Dateline NBC, longtime seasonal resident
