= Calochromus dimidiatus =

Scientific classification
- Kingdom: Animalia
- Phylum: Arthropoda
- Class: Insecta
- Order: Coleoptera
- Suborder: Polyphaga
- Infraorder: Elateriformia
- Family: Lycidae
- Genus: Calochromus
- Species: C. dimidiatus

Binomial name
- Calochromus dimidiatus LeConte, 1875

Species of beetle

Calochromus dimidiatus is a species of net-winged beetle in the family Lycidae. It is found in North America.
