= Robert M. Hunt =

American physician

- Born: Robert Menzo Hunt; 1828; Herkimer County, New York, US
- Died: July 15, 1902 (aged 73–74); Nevada City, California, US
- Education: Geneva Medical College; Castleton Medical College; Albany Medical College
- Occupation: Physician

Robert Menzo Hunt (1828 – July 15, 1902) was an American physician in the U.S. state of California. Hunt was the first physician to practice medicine in Nevada City. For 44 years, he served as county physician of Nevada County, superintending the management of the county hospital. He was a charter member of the California Medical Society.

== Early years ==
Hunt was born in Herkimer County, New York, in 1828. He attended the common schools, and later worked in a machine shop. He also worked with a surveyor for three years. In 1847, he began to study medicine with his brother, Harvey Hunt, at Utica, New York, receiving his medical education at Geneva Medical College, Castleton Medical College, and Albany Medical College.

== Career ==
Immediately upon graduation, in 1850, he decided to go to California via the Isthmus of Panama, and upon arriving in California, he headed for the mines on an ox team from Sacramento to Nevada City, arriving about May 1, 1850. He was engaged in mining and lumbering for about two years, and then went into the drug store business. Since 1853, Hunt was in active practice. He was county physician from 1859, superintending the management of the Nevada County Hospital. During his long years of service he "officiated" at 2,800 cases of confinement.

== Personal life ==
Hunt was married to Jennie Briggs whose sister, Susie, married Thomas Bard McFarland, also of Nevada City; McFarland was associate justice of the Supreme Court of California. Hunt was a director of Citizens Bank, and a member of the Freemasons. After he died at Nevada City, in 1902, his ashes were returned to Utica, and placed in the family vault.
