= Fair Haven Union High School =

Location
- 33 Mechanic Street; Fair Haven, Vermont 05743; United States; 43°36′12″N 73°16′14″W

Information
- Type: Public
- School district: Fair Haven Union School District 16
- Principal: Ben Worthing
- Teaching staff: 39.00 (on FTE basis)
- Enrollment: 508 (2023-2024)
- Student to teacher ratio: 13.03
- Colors: Blue and White
- Sports: Football, Jv Boys Soccer, Jv Girls Soccer, Varsity Boys Soccer, Varsity Girls Soccer, Jv + Varsity Baseball; Softball, Field Hockey, Track, Bowling, Bass Fishing
- Nickname: FHU
- Team name: The Fair Haven Slaters
- Website: www.fhuhs.org

The Fair Haven Union High School (FHUHS) is a public high school located in Rutland County, Vermont, United States. It serves about 550 students from the towns of Orwell, Castleton, Benson, Hubbardton, West Haven, and Fair Haven. FHUHS is a part of the Slate Valley Unified School District (SVUSD). As of 2023 the principal is Ben Worthing and the curriculum director is Casey O'Meara.
