= The Blue Cat of Castle Town =

Children's novel by Catherine Coblentz

First edition (publ. Longmans Green)

The Blue Cat of Castle Town is a children's novel by Catherine Coblentz, illustrated by Janice Holland. It tells the story of the kitten born on a blue moon, whose destiny was to bring the song of the river, with its message of beauty, peace, and contentment, to the inhabitants of Castle Town.

The book, illustrated by Janice Holland, was first published in 1949, and was a Newbery Honor recipient in 1950.

According to the author's note at the end, the book was inspired by Coblentz's visit to Castleton, Vermont in 1946, with her husband, who was interested in seeing a nearby wind turbine then being used to generate electricity. Librarian Hulda Cole told her of a local girl who had made an embroidered carpet that hung in the Metropolitan Museum of Art. Among its motifs, inspired by the natural world of its creator, was a blue cat. Coblentz, a Vermont native, drew on real people from the town's history to tell the story of the blue cat's adventures.

== Plot summary ==
In the early 1830s, in a small town in Vermont, a blue kitten is born. Every kitten must find a hearth, but a blue kitten has the hardest time of all, for he must learn the river's song and then teach it to the keeper of that hearth. His mother teaches him not to listen to the river, but eventually he cannot help but hear the river talking to him, learns the song and seeks his fortune.

He first meets a barn cat, whom he ignores, and a girl who slams the door in his face. His first home is with pewterer Ebenezer Southmayd. Southmayd is old and has given up making his most beautiful work to turn out cheap, shiny trade items. Singing the river's song, the kitten inspires Ebenezer to make one beautiful, perfect teapot according to the old formula. Alas, the pewterer drops dead when it is finished, and the blue kitten must find a new hearth.

Next he meets a weaver, John Gilroy. Two women want him to weave fine linen, but he is contracted to make salt-and-pepper cloth for Arunah Hyde of the Mansion House. He accepts the job, inspired in part by the river's song. Hyde shows up, angry and in a hurry, and Gilroy returns to the more profitable work and turns the kitten outside. As his stagecoach is tearing off in a hurry, Hyde scoops up the kitten.

At the Mansion House, Hyde is constantly shouting at people to make more money—but he also plies the blue kitten with rich cream and delicious salmon, until he grows into a blue cat. Singing the river's song to Hyde, he finds that Hyde has his own song, a dark song of progress and industry and power—and a plan to decorate the Mansion House's front window with a lovely stuffed blue cat. He escapes, but falls ill and is rescued by the very barn cat he ignored on his first visit. She cares for him along with her own yellow kittens. He recovers, but has forgotten the song.

Come spring, he finds the town possessed by Arunah's song. In the church he meets the carpenter Thomas Royal Dake, who has it in mind to build a truly beautiful pulpit, but has been told by the building committee to do it more cheaply. Dake, it turns out, knows the river's song, and the cat relearns it from him.

The blue cat remains with Dake through the building of the pulpit in white pine and cherry. Then he returns to Zeruah Guernsey, the sad girl on the farm, and to his friend the barn cat. Zeruah listens to the river's song, but makes no move to sing it for some time.

Finally she puts aside her sadness and begins work on an embroidered carpet. Into the carpet she puts flowers from the woods and from her dead mother's garden, her father's favorite white rooster. She embroiders the blue cat into the carpet, and he realizes what he must do to thank his friend the barn cat. One by one, he brings her kittens into the house for Zeruah to add to the carpet.

Zeruah's carpet becomes a legend in the town, and many people stop by to see it. The blue cat sings to them, and gradually Arunah Hyde's song loses its power as the townspeople rediscover the importance of creating "beauty and peace and content".
