= William Cary Van Fleet =

American judge (1852-1923)

- Van Fleet c. 1897–1898

Judge of the United States District Court for the Northern District of California
- In office April 2, 1907 – September 3, 1923
- Appointed by: Theodore Roosevelt
- Preceded by: Seat established by 34 Stat. 1253
- Succeeded by: Frank Henry Kerrigan

Associate Justice of the California Supreme Court
- In office May 7, 1894 – January 3, 1899
- Appointed by: Henry Markham
- Preceded by: Van R. Paterson
- Succeeded by: Walter Van Dyke

Personal details
- Born: William Cary Van Fleet; March 24, 1852 Maumee, Ohio
- Died: September 3, 1923 (aged 71) San Francisco, California
- Party: Republican
- Education: read law

William Cary Van Fleet (March 24, 1852 – September 3, 1923) was an associate justice of the California Supreme Court and a United States district judge of the United States District Court for the Northern District of California.

== Education and career ==
Van Fleet (seated, left) with other Justices of the Supreme Court of California c. 1897–1898

Born in Maumee, Ohio, in 1869 Van Fleet came to California. He read law in the offices of H. O. Beatty, and entered the bar in 1873. He was an assistant district attorney of Sacramento County, California from 1878 to 1879. He was a California State Assemblyman from 1881 to 1882, and was the Director of California State Prisons from 1883 to 1884. He was a Judge of the Superior Court of California from 1884 to 1892, and was appointed by Governor Henry Markham an associate justice of the Supreme Court of California, serving from May 7, 1894, to January 3, 1899. In November 1898, he ran on the Republican and United Labor Party ticket for another term but lost the election to Democratic Walter Van Dyke. After stepping down from the court, he practiced in the firm of Mastic, Belcher, Van Fleet & Mastick.

== Federal judicial service ==
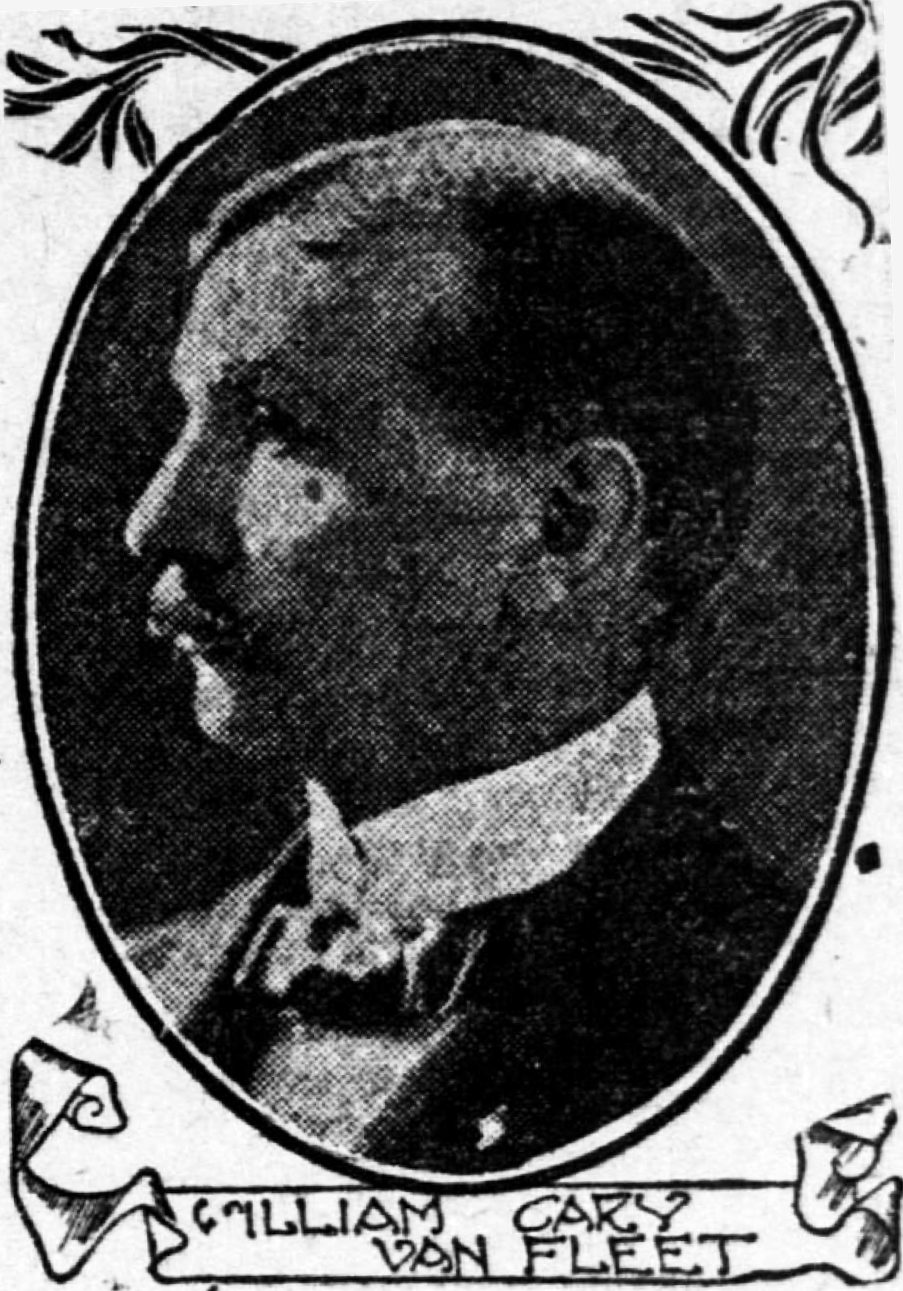
Portrait of Van Fleet published in The San Francisco Call, April 1907

On April 2, 1907, Van Fleet received a recess appointment from President Theodore Roosevelt to a new seat on the United States District Court for the Northern District of California created by 34 Stat. 1253. Formally nominated to the same position by President Roosevelt on December 3, 1907, he was confirmed by the United States Senate on December 17, 1907, and received his commission the same day. Van Fleet served until his death on September 3, 1923, in San Francisco, California.

== Personal ==
Van Fleet married twice. On April 12, 1877, he married Mary Isabella Carey, who died in Sacramento on February 14, 1878. They had a son, Ransom. After her death, he married Lizzie Eldridge Crocker (sister of Henry and niece of Charles and Edwin of the prominent Crocker family) in San Francisco on January 19, 1887. They had four children, Alan, William, Clark, and Julia.

== See also ==
- List of justices of the Supreme Court of California

Legal offices
Preceded by Van R. Paterson	Associate Justice of the California Supreme Court; 1894–1899	Succeeded by Walter Van Dyke
Preceded by Seat established by 34 Stat. 1253	Judge of the United States District Court for the Northern District of California; 1907–1923	Succeeded by Frank Henry Kerrigan
