= Rebecca Wilder Holmes =

American musician (1871–1953)

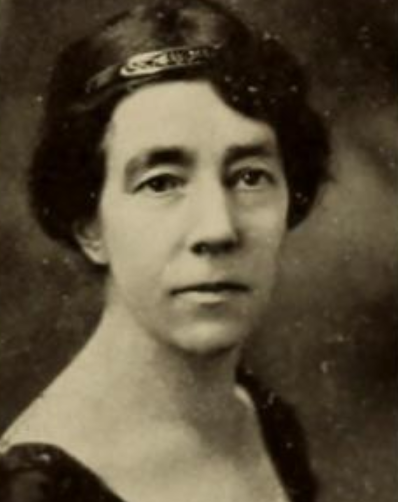
- Rebecca Wilder Holmes, from the 1925 yearbook of Smith College
- Born: June 12, 1871; Benson, Vermont
- Died: January 17, 1953 (aged 81); Los Angeles, California
- Occupations: Musician, music professor
- Relatives: Harris Hawthorne Wilder (cousin)

Rebecca Wilder Holmes (June 12, 1871 – January 17, 1953) was an American musician. She was a violinist, and taught at Mount Holyoke College and Smith College. She was founder and first director of the Smith College Symphony Orchestra.

== Early life and education ==
Holmes was born in Benson, Vermont, the daughter of Henry M. Holmes and Elizabeth Wilder Holmes. Her father was a clergyman. Her maternal uncle Solon Wilder was a composer, hymn writer, and music educator; her cousin Harris Hawthorne Wilder was a biology professor at Smith College. She trained as a violinist in Berlin, under Joseph Joachim, with further studies under Hugo Heermann in Frankfurt and Julius Eichberg in Boston.

== Career ==
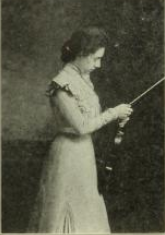
Rebecca Wilder Holmes, from a 1901 publication

Holmes taught and played violin concerts in New England in the 1890s. She was described as a "gifted young violinist", "making rapid strides to the front in her profession", in 1900. She played a Guarneri violin made in 1721 and an Amati violin made in 1660 at a chamber concert in 1904.

She was a professor of music at Smith College from the 1890s until her retirement in 1936. She was founder and director of the Smith College Symphony Orchestra. She also taught violin at Mount Holyoke College. From 1924 to 1925 she taught at the Springfield National Institute of Musical Art. She had a well-known collection of antique instruments and old musical manuscripts, many of them gathered on visits to Europe.

== Publications ==
- "Plan of Study in Outside Violin Instruction as Basis for Credit in the High School" (1917)
- Progressive Scale and Chord Studies for the Violin (1922)
- "Harmonics in Theory and Practice" (1925, musical composition)

== Personal life ==
Holmes lived with an older brother and a niece in Los Angeles in her later years. She died there in 1953, at the age of 81. Her niece and namesake Rebecca Haight Hathaway was a cellist. Her collection of musical instruments was sold or donated to Smith College by 1974, and one of her harp guitars is in the musical instrument collection of the Museum of Fine Arts, Boston.
