= Bomoseen, Vermont =

- Village
- Location within Vermont
- Coordinates: 43°38′37″N 73°11′55″W
- Country: United States
- State: Vermont
- County: Rutland
- Elevation: 430 ft (130 m)
- Time zone: UTC-5 (Eastern (EST))
  - Summer (DST): UTC-4 (EDT)
- ZIP code: 05732
- Area code: 802
- GNIS feature ID: 1456519

Bomoseen is an unincorporated village in the town of Castleton, Rutland County, Vermont, United States. The community is located along Vermont Route 30 on the eastern shore of Lake Bomoseen, 11.5 miles (18.5 km) west of Rutland. Bomoseen has a post office with ZIP code 05732. The town of Castleton incorporates the nearby Bomoseen Lake and also the Bomoseen State Park.
