= Hydeville, Vermont =

- Unincorporated village
- Location within Vermont
- Coordinates: 43°36′20″N 73°13′41″W
- Country: United States
- State: Vermont
- County: Rutland
- Elevation: 436 ft (133 m)
- Time zone: UTC-5 (Eastern (EST))
  - Summer (DST): UTC-4 (EDT)
- ZIP code: 05750
- Area code: 802
- GNIS feature ID: 1457957

Hydeville is an unincorporated village in the southwest part of the town of Castleton, Rutland County, Vermont, United States. The community is located along Vermont Route 4A 12.8 miles (20.6 km) west of Rutland. Hydeville has a post office with ZIP code 05750. As of the 2020 United States census, Hydeville is included in the Castleton Four Corners census-designated place for population statistics purposes.
