= Castleton Medical College Building =

- U.S. National Register of Historic Places
- U.S. Historic district – Contributing property
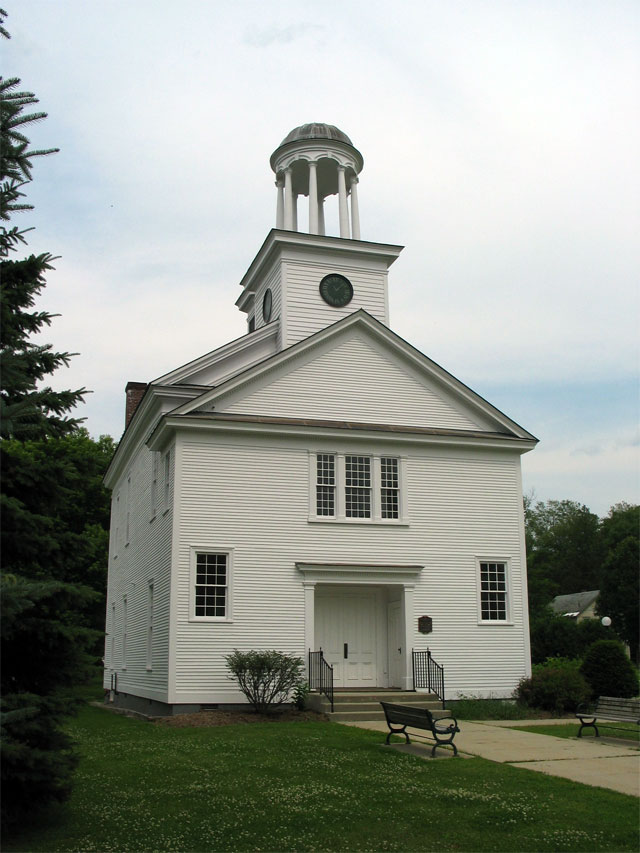

- Location within Vermont Location within the United States
- Location: Seminary St., Castleton, Vermont
- Coordinates: 43°36′36″N 73°10′43″W
- Area: 0.5 acres (0.20 ha)
- Built: 1818; 208 years ago
- Part of: Castleton Village Historic District (ID79000225)
- NRHP reference No.: 71000058

Significant dates
- Added to NRHP: March 11, 1971
- Designated CP: April 26, 1979

The Castleton Medical College Building, now known as the Old Chapel, is a historic building of the Castleton Medical College on Seminary Street in Castleton, Vermont, United States. Founded in 1818, it was the first medical college in Vermont, and the first private degree-granting medical school in the United States. The college closed in 1862.

The chapel-like building was built in 1821, and is now the oldest building on the campus of Castleton University. Its current use is for special meetings and performances for Castleton University. It was listed on the National Register of Historic Places in 1971.

== Description and history ==
The former Castleton Medical College Building stands on the Castleton University campus, between Seminary and Elm Streets. It is a two-story wooden structure, with timber framing enclosed by wooden clapboards, and a gabled roof. A projecting vestibule has a lower roof line than the main block, with a fully pedimented gable end, and the main entrance in a recess flanked by pilasters and topped by an entablature. At the front of the main roof a two-stage tower rises, square in the first stage, and with an open octagonal cupola above.

Castleton Medical College was founded in 1818, and this building was constructed in 1821. It is believed to be the oldest surviving medical school building in the United States. It was moved a short distance (200 yards (180 m)) in the 20th century to make way for new construction on the Castleton University campus. It now houses classroom facilities for the university's art department.

== Notable alumni of Castleton Medical College ==
- Smith A. Boughton, leader of the Anti-Rent War
- Charles M. Crandall, physician and member of the New York State Assembly
- Samuel Denton, physician and politician in Michigan
- Isaiah H. Hedge, physician, Baptist philanthropist at Bates College
- Robert M. Hunt, California physician
- John Gould Stephenson, physician and soldier, Librarian of Congress
- Socrates Hotchkiss Tryon Sr., pioneer physician, philanthropist

== See also ==
- National Register of Historic Places listings in Rutland County, Vermont
