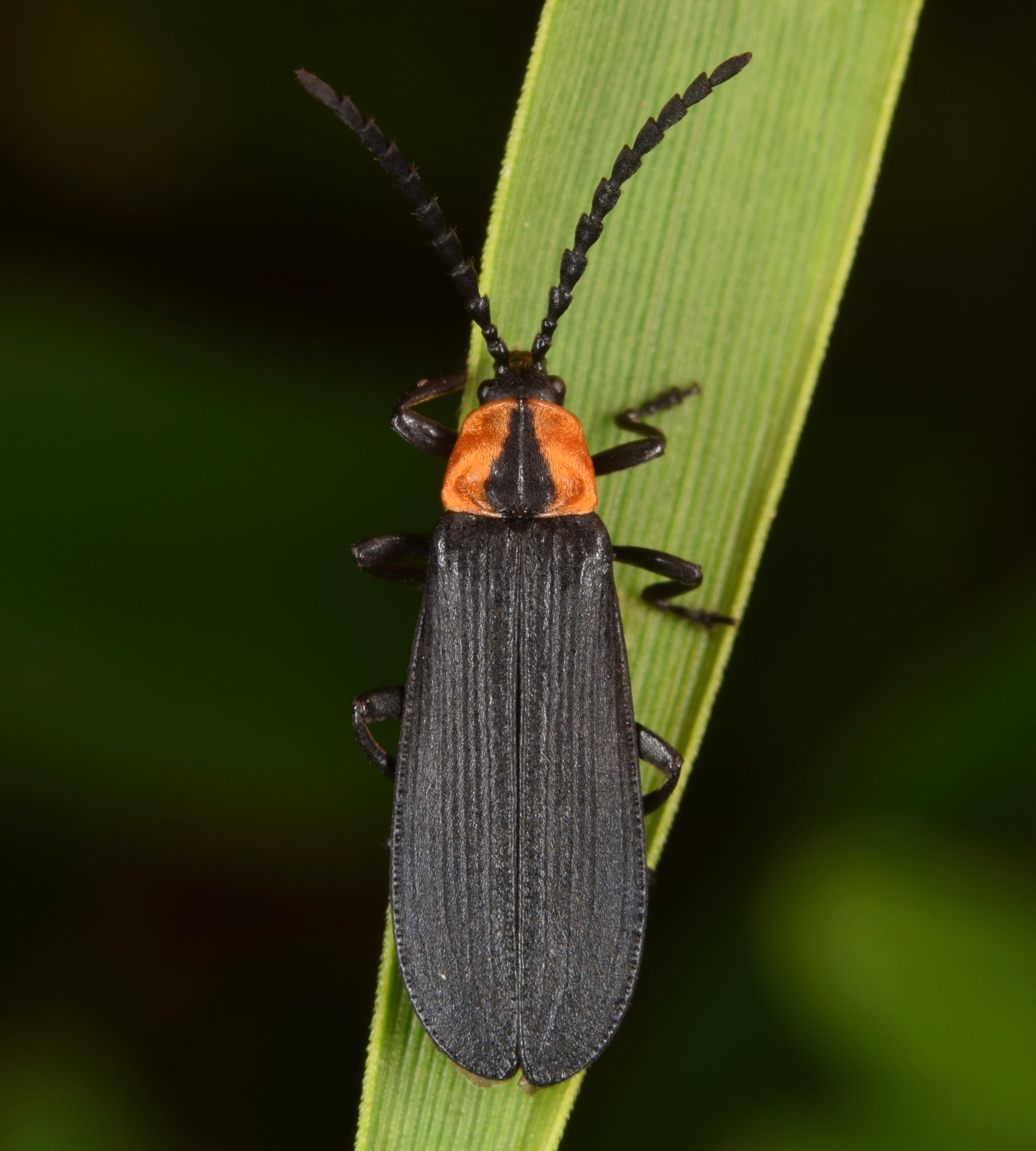
- Calochromus perfacetus

Scientific classification
- Kingdom: Animalia
- Phylum: Arthropoda
- Class: Insecta
- Order: Coleoptera
- Suborder: Polyphaga
- Infraorder: Elateriformia
- Family: Lycidae
- Subfamily: Calochrominae
- Genus: Calochromus; Guérin Méneville, 1833

= Calochromus =

Genus of beetles

Calochromus is a genus of net-winged beetles in the family Lycidae. There are at least 20 described species in Calochromus.

== Species ==
These 20 species belong to the genus Calochromus:

- Calochromus conveniens Kleine, 1926
- Calochromus dimidiatus LeConte, 1875
- Calochromus diversus Kleine, 1925
- Calochromus fervens LeConte, 1881
- Calochromus formosanus Nakane
- Calochromus harauensis
- Calochromus kelantanensis
- Calochromus macropalpis Kleine, 1926
- Calochromus nagaii
- Calochromus pallidulus Kleine, 1926
- Calochromus perfacetus (Say, 1825)
- Calochromus rubrovestitus
- Calochromus ruficollis LeConte, 1875
- Calochromus samuelsoni
- Calochromus sangkangensis
- Calochromus shirozui Nakane
- Calochromus slevini Van Dyke, 1918
- Calochromus sororius Kleine, 1926
- Calochromus subparallelus Pic
- Calochromus sungkangensis Nakane
