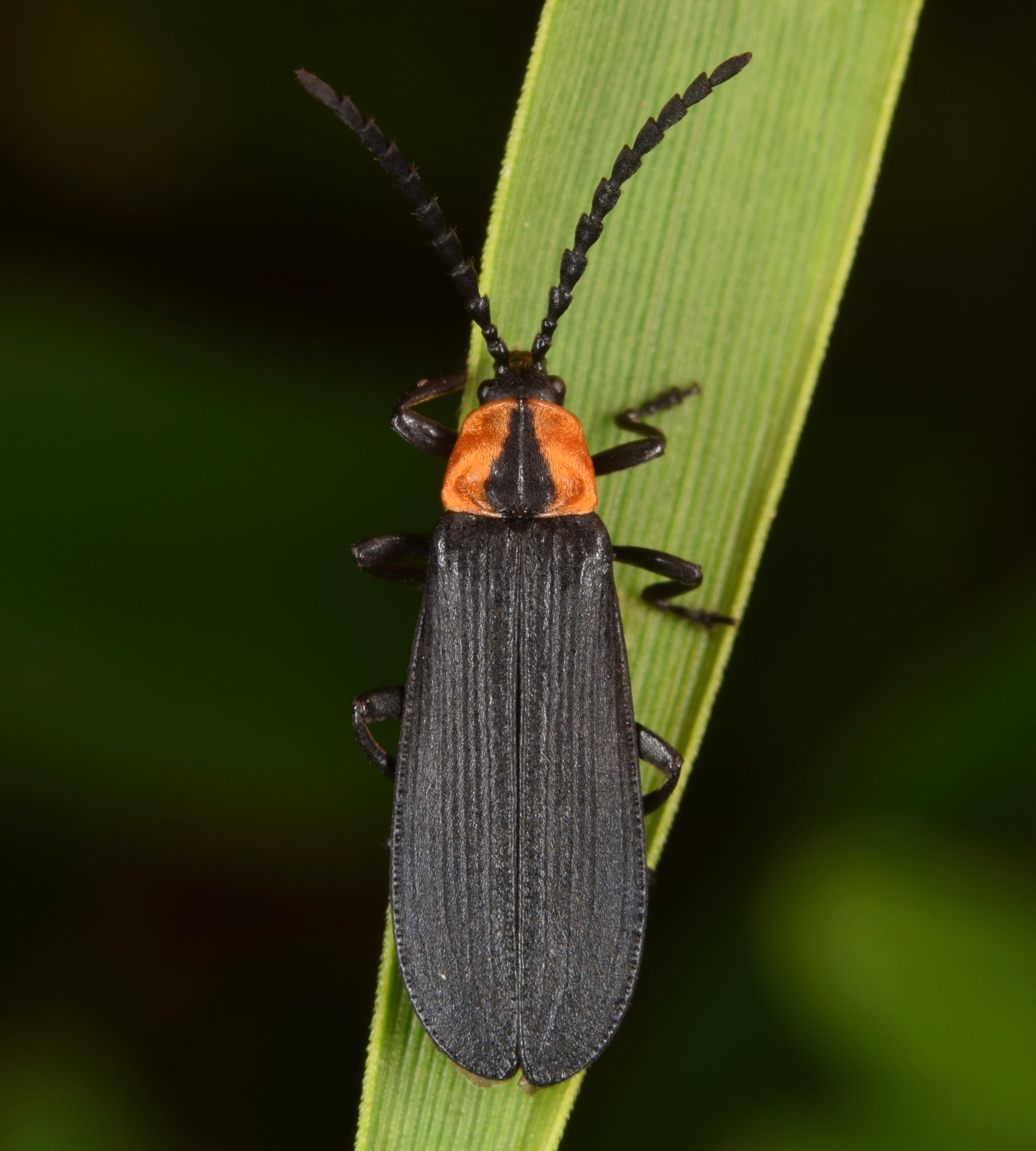

Scientific classification
- Domain: Eukaryota
- Kingdom: Animalia
- Phylum: Arthropoda
- Class: Insecta
- Order: Coleoptera
- Suborder: Polyphaga
- Infraorder: Elateriformia
- Family: Lycidae
- Genus: Calochromus
- Species: C. perfacetus

Binomial name
- Calochromus perfacetus (Say, 1825)

= Calochromus perfacetus =

Species of beetle

Calochromus perfacetus is a species of net-winged beetle in the family Lycidae. It is found in North America.
