= Edwin Van Dyke =

American physician

Edwin Cooper Van Dyke
- Born: April 7, 1869; Oakland, California
- Died: September 28, 1952 (aged 83)
- Education: University of California, Cooper Medical College
- Medical career
- Profession: Physician, Entomologist (non-medical)

Edwin Cooper Van Dyke (April 7, 1869 – September 28, 1952) was an American physician and entomologist. A leading authority on beetles (Coleoptera) of the Pacific Coast of North America, he was also an expert on insect pests of forests and forest products. He became a professor of entomology at the University of California, Berkeley, and worked on the curatorial staff at the California Academy of Sciences for almost fifty years.

== Biography ==
Van Dyke was born in Oakland, California, on April 7, 1869. His father, Walter Van Dyke, came from New York and traveled cross-country to California during the gold rush in 1849. His mother, Rowena Cooper, came by ship to California in 1850. The couple married in 1854 and Walter went on to a successful career as lawyer, judge, and State Supreme Court justice.

Van Dyke went to school in Oakland and began collecting insects while in high school. In 1885 his family moved to Los Angeles where he continued to collect and study insects. He became acquainted with Daniel Coquillett, an entomologist working as a field agent for the U.S. Department of Agriculture. Coquillett taught Van Dyke the correct methods of collecting and preparing an insect collection, gave him specimens and took him along on collecting trips. In 1890 Van Dyke made his first collecting trip to Yosemite Valley which he reached via pack train. In 1892, he published his first paper, "Butterflies of Yosemite".

He entered the University of California, Berkeley in 1889 and graduated in 1893. He then went to Cooper Medical College in San Francisco and earned a medical degree in 1895. Van Dyke continued his medical training with postgraduate work in New York City and at Johns Hopkins. Back in San Francisco he developed a successful private practice and was recognized as a specialist in eye surgery.

Despite the demands of his medical practice, Van Dyke continued to pursue his entomological interests. He joined the California Academy of Sciences in 1904 and served as curator without pay until a full-time curator was appointed in 1913. He was a charter member of the Pacific Coast Entomological Society and served as president from 1908 to 1931. He was also a charter member and of the Entomological Society of America and the Sierra Club.

In 1913 Van Dyke quit the field of medicine and devoted himself to entomology. He accepted a position at the University of California, Berkeley, as assistant in entomology, the beginning of a long and successful career as a teacher, collector, and researcher. He became an assistant professor in 1916, associate professor in 1921, full professor in 1927, and emeritus professor in 1939.

Van Dyke traveled and collected extensively throughout the Western United States. He was considered the foremost expert on beetles of the region. He was especially interested in the habitats of beetles and their distribution in North America. He described more than 400 species, focusing in particular on five families: Carabidae, Meloidae, Elateridae, Buprestidae, and Curculionidae. In 1923-1924 he collected in China, Manchuria, and Japan; in 1933 he visited Europe and Egypt. In addition, he was an expert on the insect pests in the forestry industry and authored a textbook on the topic, Forest Insects (1936). During his career he published 153 papers.

Van Dyke died on September 28, 1952. His insect collection of some 200,000 specimens was donated to the California Academy of Sciences.

== Publications ==
Van Dyke published over 150 papers and books including:

- Butterflies of Yosemite, 1892
- The distribution of insects in Western North America, 1919
- The Coleoptera collected by the Katmai expeditions, 1924
- A reclassification of the genera of North America Meloidae (Coleoptera), 1928
- Miscellaneous studies in the Elateridae and related families of Coleoptera, 1932
- Forest insects, 1936
- Rhyncogonus of the Mangarevan Expedition, 1937
- The origin and distribution of the Coleopterous insect fauna of North America, 1939
- The Coleoptera of the Galapagos Islands, 1953
