= Milton H. Myrick =

American judge (1826–1907)

Milton Hills Myrick
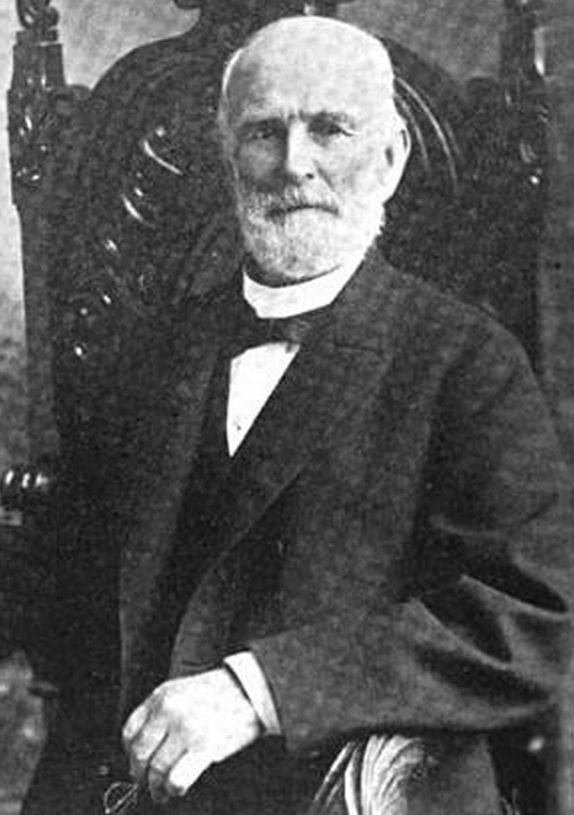
- Milton H. Myrick from History of the Bench and Bar of California (1901).

Associate Justice of the California Supreme Court
- In office January 5, 1880 – January 3, 1887
- Appointed by: Direct election
- Preceded by: Elections under new constitution of 1879
- Succeeded by: Thomas B. McFarland

Personal details
- Born: May 28, 1826 Oneida County, New York, U.S.
- Died: September 18, 1907 (aged 81) Saratoga, California, U.S.
- Spouse: Mary Ludlow (m. 1850; died 1879) Lucy Myrick Emma Adelia Simpson (m. 1883)

Milton Hills Myrick (May 28, 1826 – September 18, 1907) was an associate justice of the Supreme Court of California from January 5, 1880 to January 3, 1887.

== Biography ==
Born on a farm near Paris Hill, in Oneida County, New York, Myrick's father was Rev. Luther Myrick of New England, a descendant of Ensign William Myrick, who had settled in Eastham, Massachusetts, on Cape Cod, in 1646, and served six years under Miles Standish. Myrick moved with his family as his father assumed various ministries. As a boy, Myrick learned to typset for a weekly paper published by his father in Oswego, and worked in a printing office while attended school at the Cazenovia Seminary in Cazenovia, New York. In May 1843, the family moved to a farm in Jackson County, Michigan, where Myrick's father died that September.

From 1845 to 1847, Myrick continued to work in printing, first in Jackson County, then returning to New York, to Albany (where he worked on the Argus), Syracuse, New York City, and finally in the government printing office in Washington, D.C. While employed in Washington, Myrick "saw John Quincy Adams as he lay dying on a cot in the speaker's room". In 1848, Myrick returned to Michigan and read law in the law office of Frink & Blair. During this time, he became the deputy county clerk of Jackson County, and of the Michigan Supreme Court, when it sat in that county. In 1850, he was admitted to the bar, and the following summer he worked for governor William H. Seward, performing tasks related to a case being heard in Detroit.

In 1854, Myrick traveled to California by the Nicaragua route, arriving in San Francisco in October with only five dollars in his possession. He worked as a printer for a year on the San Francisco Sun. In October 1855, he moved to Shasta, California and helped to establish the Shasta Republican. In May 1857, he moved to Red Bluff, California and resumed the practice of law in partnership with Warner Earll. In 1863 to 1865, during the American Civil War, he was a Major in the Lassen Rangers, a state militia unit. In May 1866, he returned to San Francisco, this time as an attorney, and was appointed by Judge O.C. Pratt of the Twelfth Judicial District to act as a referee in a complicated partitions case.

In 1871, he was elected to a four-year term on the county probate court as the nominee of the Tax Payer's Convention, taking office on January 1, 1872. He was reelected as a Republican in 1875, his second term running from January 1, 1876, to December 31, 1879.

In 1879, when adoption of a new constitution required elections for all seats on the Supreme Court, he was nominated as a Republican candidate and was elected as an associate justice. The new justices drew lots to determine length of term with Myrick picking seven years, serving from January 5, 1880 to January 3, 1887.

After stepping down from the high court, Myrick served as president of the Saratoga Village Improvement Association, and resumed the private practice of law with Frank P. Deering. In May 1888, Governor Waterman appointed Myrick as a judge of the Santa Clara County Superior Court. In October 1897, he gave a speech at the Unitarian Club of San Francisco opposing Hawaiian annexation by the United States. In January 1898, he was elected a trustee of the San Francisco Bar Association. He remained in practice until his death in 1907.

== Civic activities ==
Myrick was a founding trustee of Mills College. He was also a member of the Bohemian Club.

== Personal life ==
Myrick married three times. On October 24, 1850, Myrick married Mary Ludlow in Jackson, Michigan, and they had a son, George Fred Myrick. By 1870, he was remarried to Lucy Myrick and living in San Francisco. By 1880, he was a widower. On November 7, 1883, he married again to Emma Adelia Simpson in Virginia City, Nevada.

== See also ==
- List of justices of the Supreme Court of California

Legal offices
Preceded by Elections under new constitution of 1879	Associate Justice of the California Supreme Court; 1880–1887	Succeeded by Thomas B. McFarland
