= Hortonia, Vermont =

- Unincorporated community
- Location within Vermont Location within the United States
- Coordinates: 43°44′43″N 73°13′23″W
- Country: United States
- State: Vermont
- County: Rutland
- Elevation: 486 ft (148 m)
- Time zone: UTC-5 (Eastern (EST))
  - Summer (DST): UTC-4 (EDT)
- ZIP Code: 05743 (Benson)
- Area code: 802
- GNIS feature ID: 1457899

Hortonia is an unincorporated community in Rutland County, Vermont, United States.
