= Samuel Denton =

American politician (1803–1860)

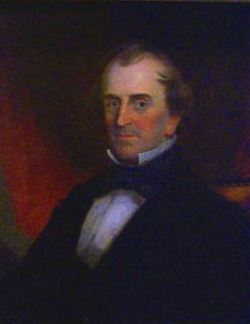
- Portrait of Denton by Alvah Bradish (1852)

Member of the Michigan Senate
- In office 1845–1848

Personal details
- Born: July 2, 1803 Wallkill, Orange County, New York, U.S.
- Died: August 17, 1860 (aged 57) Ann Arbor, Michigan, U.S.
- Education: Castleton Medical College
- Occupation: Politician, physician

Samuel Denton (July 2, 1803 – August 17, 1860) was an American medical doctor and politician.

== Career ==
Denton was born in Wallkill, New York on July 2, 1803. He graduated from Castleton Medical College in Vermont in 1825, and moved to Ann Arbor, Michigan shortly afterwards. He served a three-year term on the Board of Regents of the University of Michigan beginning in 1837, and represented Washtenaw County in the Michigan State Senate from 1845 to 1848, serving as President pro tempore during the final session. He was a professor of medicine and pathology at the University of Michigan Medical School from 1850 until his death in Ann Arbor on August 17, 1860.

=== Denton, Michigan ===
Denton Road in Canton, Michigan obtained its name from Samuel Denton who created a plat establishing the Village of Denton with 159 lots, eight streets & a cemetery. Denton Road was the main road into the Village of Denton. An 1839 map show the road going into Cherry Hill Village. Today, Denton Road runs north from Ecorse Road, through the Village of Denton and continues North to the junction of Ridge, Saltz, and Denton Roads.
