= Lake Bomoseen =

Lake in Rutland County, Vermont

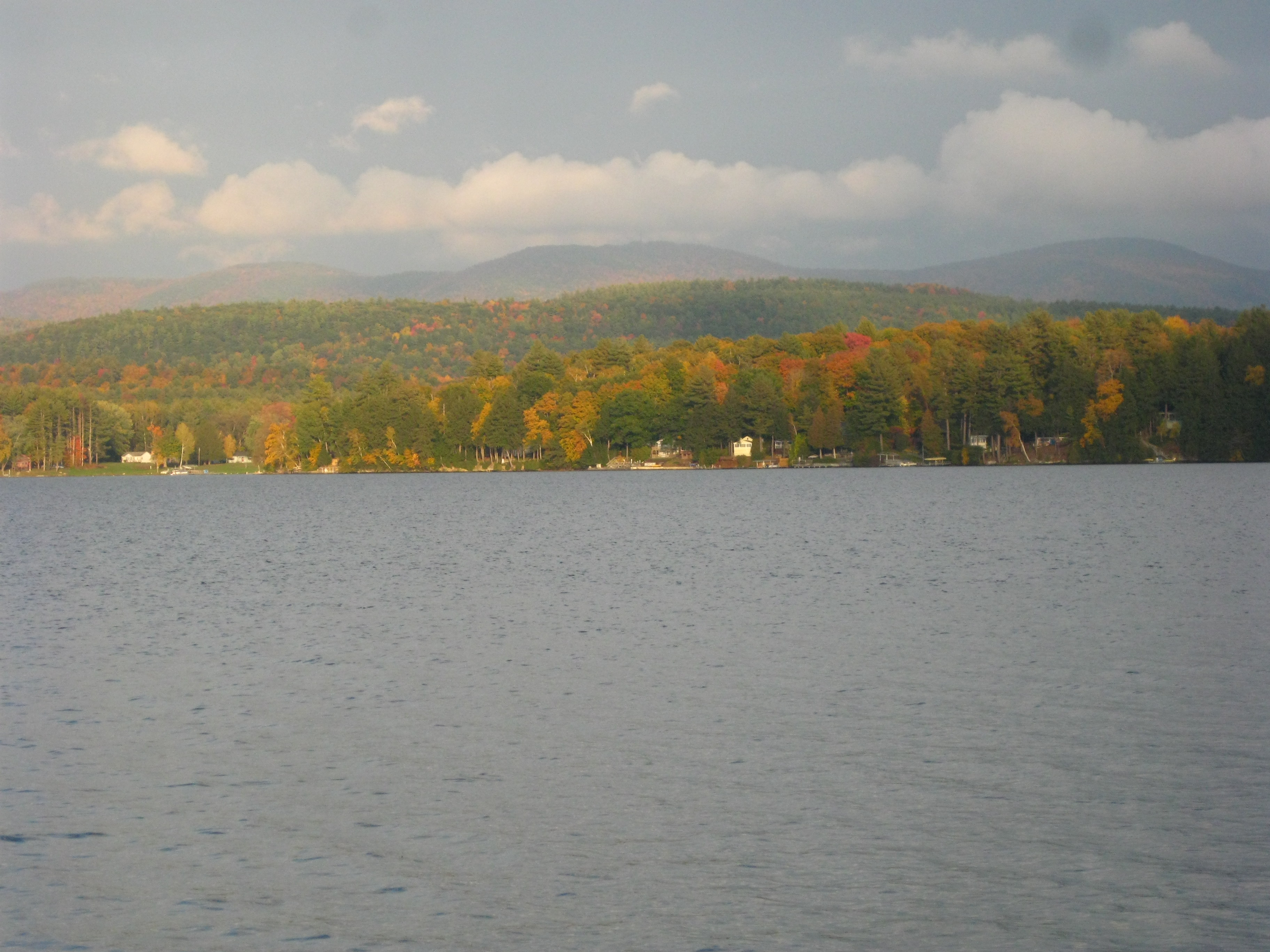
- Lake Bomoseen, a lake in Castleton, Vermont, US.

- Location within Vermont Location within the United States
- Location: Rutland County, Vermont
- Coordinates: 43°38′39″N 073°12′47″W
- Primary outflows: Castleton River
- Catchment area: 24,770 acres (100.25 km^{2})
- Basin countries: United States
- Surface area: 2,400 acres (9.6 km^{2})
- Average depth: 27 feet (8.2 m)
- Max. depth: 65 feet (19.8 m)
- Surface elevation: 410 ft (120 m)
- Islands: Neshobe Island, Rabbit Island

Lake Bomoseen (/ˈbɑːməziːn/ BAH-muh-zeen) is a freshwater lake in the western part of the U.S. state of Vermont in the towns of Castleton and Hubbardton in Rutland County. It is the largest lake that lies entirely within the state's boundaries, with a surface area of approximately 2,400 acres (9.6 km^{2}). The lake was formed by glaciation and has an average and maximum depth of 27 feet (8.2 m) and 65 feet (19.8 m), respectively. It drains a 24,770-acre (100.25 km^{2}) watershed, has five major inlets, and empties to the Castleton River, a tributary of the Poultney River, which in turn flows west to East Bay at the southern end of Lake Champlain.

Bomoseen State Park occupies a portion of the lake's western shoreline. Most of the remaining area around the lake is privately owned. The lake has such recreational accommodations as a public beach, marinas, and public boat launches, in addition to the state park. There are approximately 1,000 residences around the lake, as well as restaurants and other commercial facilities.

== History ==
Millions of years ago, clays that accumulated on the ocean floor compressed into shale. When the ocean floor uplifted to form the Taconic Mountains, heat and pressure metamorphosed the shale into much harder slate. Lake Bomoseen nestles in a valley surrounded by some of the lower hills on the western side of the range. The Taconics are the slate-producing region of Vermont, and the area's history parallels the rise and fall of Vermont's slate industry.

Bomoseen State Park has several quarry holes and adjacent colorful slate rubble piles. These quarries provided slate for the West Castleton Railroad and Slate Company, a complex of sixty to seventy buildings that stood between Glen Lake and Lake Bomoseen. Several slate buildings and foundations remain in the park, and a self-guided Slate History Trail brochure is available at the contact station.

In the 1920s, literary critic Alexander Woollcott owned Neshobe Island, which served as a retreat and playground for members of the Algonquin Round Table. Visitors from that group included Harpo Marx. Wollcott created another group called the Neshobe Island Club. This group of visitors included Laurence Olivier, Helen Hayes, Vivien Leigh, Ring Lardner, Dorothy Parker, Noël Coward, Thornton Wilder, and Walt Disney.

== Activities at Lake Bomoseen ==
- Boating, water skiing, wakeboarding, scuba diving, wind surfing, swimming, fishing, camping, and hunting
- Ice fishing and cross country skiing in winter
- Crystal Beach: volleyball, swimming, playground, picnicking, basketball
- Bomoseen State Park: camping, swimming, volleyball, hiking
- Fishing: bass, panfish, bullhead, brown trout, yellow perch, smelt, and northern pike
- Prospect Point Golf Club, 9-hole public golf course

== Conservation ==
Ospreys were virtually wiped out in Vermont and most of the United States by pesticides decades ago. DDT got into the food chain, and osprey populations plummeted as the chemical made their eggshells thin and brittle. Central Vermont Public Service has worked on osprey restoration efforts with the state for over 15 years, installing platforms at hydroelectric facilities, creating buffer zones and educating Vermonters on the birds' need for space. A platform is under consideration at Lake Bomoseen. There have been occasional osprey sightings on Lake Bomoseen over the last few years.

Bald eagles were also victims of the pesticide use of the 1950s and -60s. In recent years, there has been a bald eagle nesting site on Neshobe Island, in the center of Lake Bomoseen, where the eagles feed on trout, bass and other fish species that are plentiful in the lake.

== Controversy ==
Lake Bomoseen has had a long history of invasive weed problems. By the early 1980s, Eurasian watermilfoil (Myriophyllum spicatum) was the dominant weed species in the lake. Eurasian watermilfoil is an introduced species that is difficult to control due to its ability to survive in various environmental conditions. At one point the watermilfoil covered 590 acres (2.4 km^{2}) of the lake, impairing its recreational and commercial uses.

Researchers from Middlebury College working under contract for the Vermont Department of Environmental Conservation introduced a native aquatic weevil (Euhrychiopsis lecontei) to help combat the problem. Other treatments such as the aquatic herbicide Sonar have been used at other lakes.

In recent years, zebra mussels have entered Lake Bomoseen after many years of attempted prevention.

== See also ==
- Battle of Hubbardton
