= Castleton, Vermont =

- Town
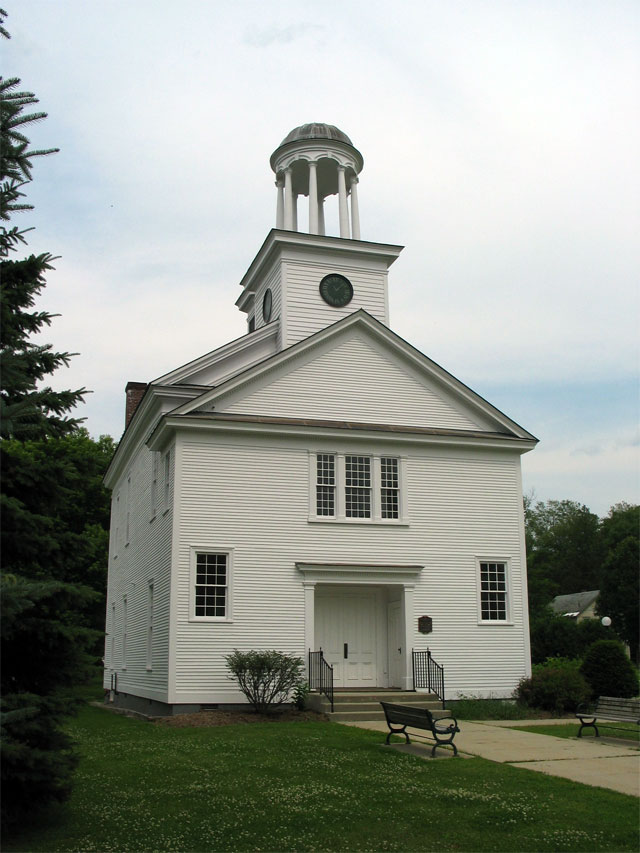
- The "Old Chapel" (Castleton Medical College Building) in Castleton

- Logo

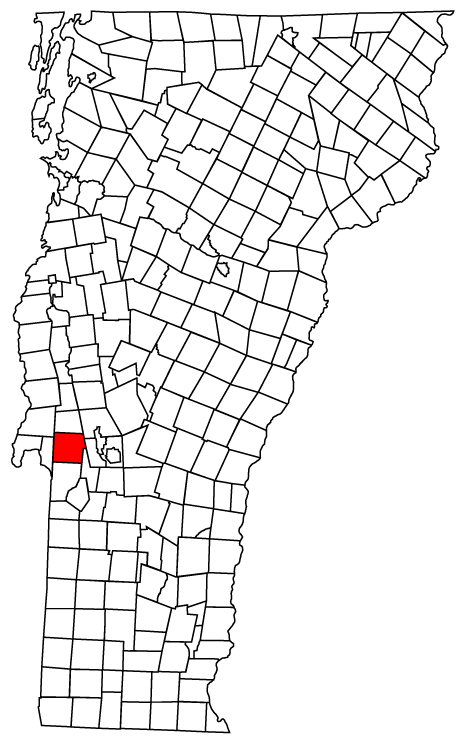
- Castleton, Vermont
- Coordinates: 43°37′39″N 73°09′25″W
- Country: United States
- State: Vermont
- County: Rutland
- Settled: 1770
- Chartered: 1761
- Communities: Castleton; Castleton Four Corners; Avalon Beach; Blissville; Bomoseen; Crystal Beach; Hydeville; Neshobe Beach; West Castleton

Area
  - Total: 42.4 sq mi (109.7 km^{2})
  - Land: 39.0 sq mi (101.1 km^{2})
  - Water: 3.3 sq mi (8.6 km^{2})
- Elevation: 643 ft (196 m)

Population (2020)
  - Total: 4,458
  - Density: 114.2/sq mi (44.09/km^{2})
- Time zone: UTC−5 (Eastern (EST))
  - Summer (DST): UTC−4 (EDT)
- ZIP Codes: 05735 (Castleton); 05732 (Bomoseen); 05743 (Fair Haven)
- Area code: 802
- FIPS code: 50-11950
- GNIS feature ID: 1462065
- Website: castletonvermont.org

Castleton is a town in Rutland County, Vermont, United States. Castleton is about 15 miles (24 km) to the west of Rutland, the county's seat and most populous city, and about 7 miles (11 km) east of the New York/Vermont state border. The town had a population of 4,458 at the 2020 census. A campus of Vermont State University is located there, with roots dating to 1787.

== History ==
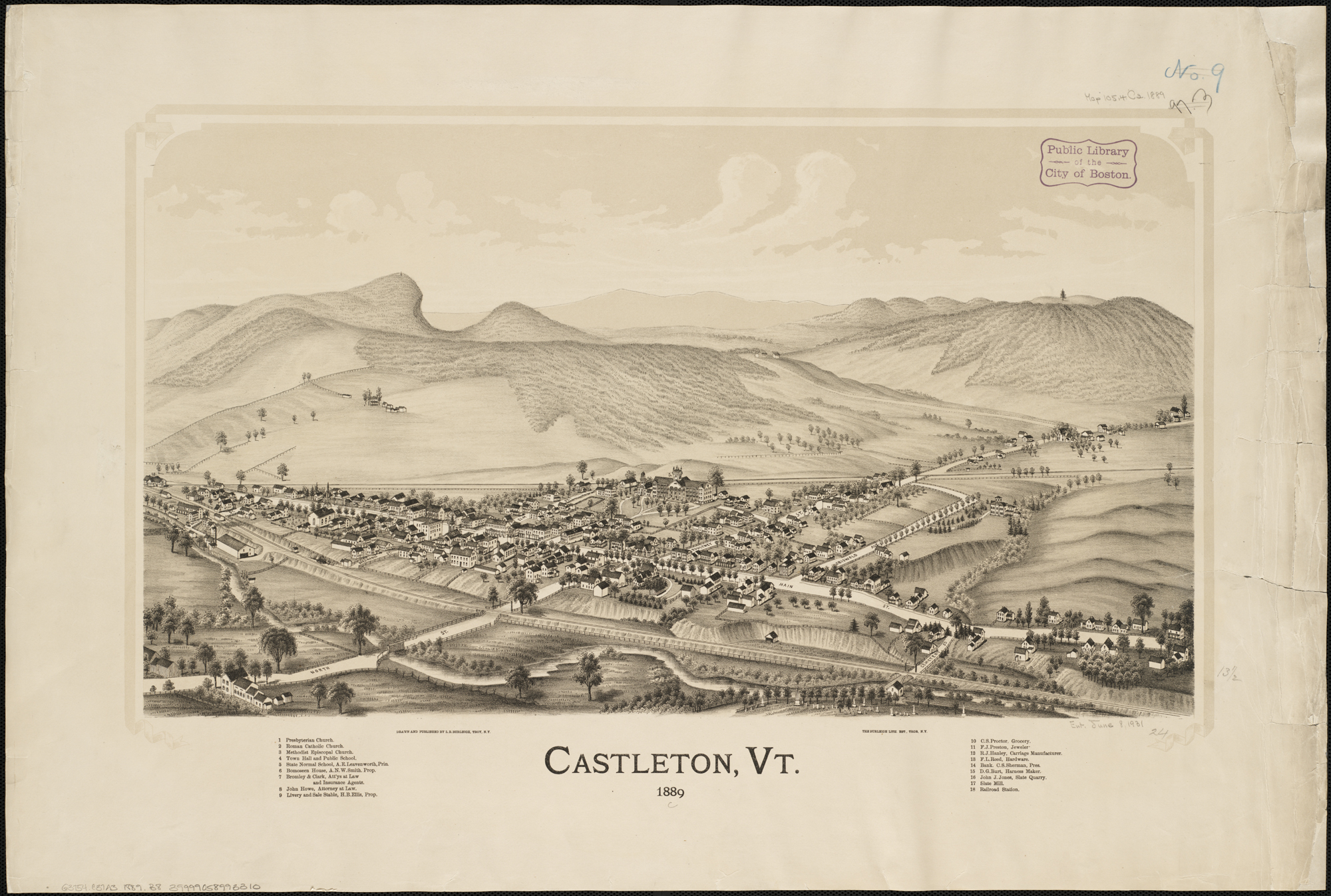
Print of Castleton from 1889 by L.R. Burleigh with listing of landmarks

Castleton was settled in 1770 and chartered in 1761. The charter for 36 square miles (93 km^{2}) of land was granted by Governor Benning Wentworth of New Hampshire and divided the land into 70 "rights" or "shares". Governor Wentworth retained ownership of two shares, and several others were given for churches and a school.

Three families had settled in Castleton by 1770. In the spring of 1767, some of the town's first settlers, Amos Bird and Noah Lee, arrived in Castleton from Salisbury, Connecticut. Castleton's favorite landmark, Birdseye Mountain, is named for Colonel Amos Bird. He had acquired 40 shares of land when the town was chartered and built a permanent residence there in the summer of 1769. More settlers followed, and by 1777, the town consisted of 17 families.

In May 1775, Ethan Allen and his Green Mountain Boys met in Castleton with Benedict Arnold to plan their next day's attack on Fort Ticonderoga, 30 miles (48 km) west, on the New York side of Lake Champlain. Their successful capture of the fort was a holding action that lasted two years until the British launched a powerful sweep southward on Lake Champlain. The battle at nearby Hubbardton, followed by battles at Bennington and Saratoga, marked the turning point of the Revolutionary War in the north. Although German soldiers were stationed in Castleton for a time in 1777, they left as the fortunes of the war changed, and Tory sympathizers were treated with scorn by Castleton settlers. Fort Warren, built in 1777, was also located in Castleton.

The first medical school in Vermont was chartered here in 1818.

Following the war, Castleton continued to grow as an agricultural community. Farmers raised cattle, and then turned for a while to sheep. Sawmills and gristmills were the first industries established in town. During the 19th century, the slate and marble industries thrived in and around Castleton. The railroad came in 1854, and the last half of the century had the development of tourism around Lake Bomoseen. In the 19th century, Castleton flourished, and many residents built elaborate houses to replace their log cabins and primitive frame houses. Several luxury hotels were built around the west end of the lake. A trolley system ran from the center of town to Lake Bomoseen, a destination for tourists vacationing during the summer. The Hydeville area flourished in the mid-19th century as a slate-quarrying and milling center.

Between 1900 and 1940, several fires occurred in Castleton Village, Castleton Corners, and Hydeville, as well as at the lakeside resorts. Despite this destruction of hotels and the original commercial and industrial areas of its villages, the town of Castleton retains an architectural heritage spanning 200 years of Vermont history. Castleton's mile-long, tree-shaded Main Street, with its array of Federal- and Greek Revival-style houses and public buildings, many by builder Thomas Royal Dake, has been listed almost in its entirety on the National Register of Historic Places.

== Arts and culture ==
=== Museums and other points of interest ===
The Higley House, built in 1810 by Erastus Higley, houses antiques and furnishings. Antique carriages are located on the grounds. The house is now maintained by the Castleton Historical Society and was built and lived in by the Higley family until 1973.

The Castleton Federated Church was built in 1833 by master builder Thomas Dake. The church is listed in the Historic American Buildings Survey.

The Cobbler's Shop is an old brick building on the corner of Main Street and Cemetery Road. It was built between 1774 and 1794 by Nehemiah Hoyt; some people believe it to be the oldest brick building in Vermont.

The Castleton Medical Chapel was built in 1821 as part of Castleton University (Castleton State College at the time). It is located on Seminary Street close to the Fine Arts Center.

== Education ==
Castleton is part of the Slate Valley Modified Unified School District. The town has one school: Castleton Elementary School, which serves grades K–6. Students from Castleton families attend high school at Fair Haven Union High School and attend junior high at Fair Haven Union Middle School.

Castleton University is located in Castleton and dates back to 1787. It is a public liberal arts college.

== Infrastructure ==
=== Transportation ===
In 2009, Castleton began running a depot station through Amtrak. The station is located behind Main Street near the post office. The old train stop was renovated early that year, giving the Castleton stop an enclosed building. The train stop runs exclusively on the Ethan Allen Express line.

== Geography ==
Castleton has a total area of 42.35 square miles (109.7 km^{2}), of which 38.9 square miles (101 km^{2}) is land and 3.45 square miles (8.9 km^{2}), or 8.1%, is water.

Within the bounds of the incorporated town, there are three distinct areas. One is Castleton village, where the post office, town offices, bank, general store, a 1940s style diner and a few other commercial enterprises are located. The university is located on a side street nearby. Lake Bomoseen is the second area, a 5-mile-long (8.0 km) resort and fishing spot in the northwest part of the town. The Bomoseen post office is in Castleton Corners, west of Castleton village and southeast of the south end of the lake. The third post office is in Hydeville, an extension of Main Street at the south end of Lake Bomoseen.

== Demographics ==
Historical population
Census	Pop.	Note	%±
1790	800		—
1800	1,039		29.9%
1810	1,420		36.7%
1820	1,541		8.5%
1830	1,783		15.7%
1840	1,769		−0.8%
1850	3,016		70.5%
1860	2,852		−5.4%
1870	3,243		13.7%
1880	2,605		−19.7%
1890	2,396		−8.0%
1900	2,089		−12.8%
1910	1,885		−9.8%
1920	1,919		1.8%
1930	1,794		−6.5%
1940	1,601		−10.8%
1950	1,748		9.2%
1960	1,902		8.8%
1970	2,837		49.2%
1980	3,637		28.2%
1990	4,278		17.6%
2000	4,367		2.1%
2010	4,717		8.0%
2020	4,458		−5.5%
U.S. Decennial Census

As of the census of 2000, there were 4,367 people, 1,550 households, and 1,007 families residing in the town. The population density was 111.9 people per square mile (43.2/km^{2}). There were 2,107 housing units at an average density of 54.0 per square mile (20.8/km^{2}). The racial makeup of the town was 97.98% White, 0.09% African American, 0.32% Native American, 0.57% Asian, 0.02% Pacific Islander, 0.48% from other races, and 0.53% from two or more races. Hispanic or Latino of any race were 1.08% of the population.

There were 1,550 households, out of which 28.8% had children under the age of 18 living with them, 52.2% were couples living together and joined in either marriage or civil union, 9.2% had a female householder with no husband present, and 35.0% were non-families. 23.7% of all households were made up of individuals, and 8.0% had someone living alone who was 65 years of age or older. The average household size was 2.47 and the average family size was 2.92.

In the town, the population was distributed by age with 19.9% under the age of 18, 22.5% from 18 to 24, 22.9% from 25 to 44, 23.9% from 45 to 64, and 10.9% who were 65 years of age or older. The median age was 33 years. For every 100 females, there were 98.1 males. For every 100 females age 18 and over, there were 94.9 males.

The median income for a household in the town was $39,615, and the median income for a family was $49,091. Males had a median income of $30,958 versus $25,139 for females. The per capita income for the town was $17,630. About 3.9% of families and 9.8% of the population were below the poverty line, including 2.9% of those under age 18 and 8.1% of those age 65 or over.

== Notable people ==
- J. M. Adams, Wisconsin State Assemblyman
- Alexander W. Buel, United States Representative from Michigan
- Jeanne C. Smith Carr (1825–1903), educator, author
- Charles W. Davis, Wisconsin State Senator
- Edwin Drake, oil driller; credited with starting the US oil industry
- Patrick Villiers Farrow artist, brother of Mia Farrow. lived in a historic church
- Chauncey Langdon, United States Representative from Vermont
- Doc Maynard, founder of Seattle
- Amos Pollard, surgeon, defender of the Alamo
- Ron Powers, Pulitzer Prize-winning writer
- Jarrod Sammis, Vermont state representative
- Samuel Shaw, United States Representative from Vermont
- Robert E. Temple, Adjutant General of New York

== Media references ==
- The Blue Cat of Castle Town (1949), a children's fantasy novel by Catherine Cate Coblentz, is placed in 1830s Castleton.

== See also ==
- Smith–Putnam wind turbine
