= Hubbardton, Vermont =

- Town
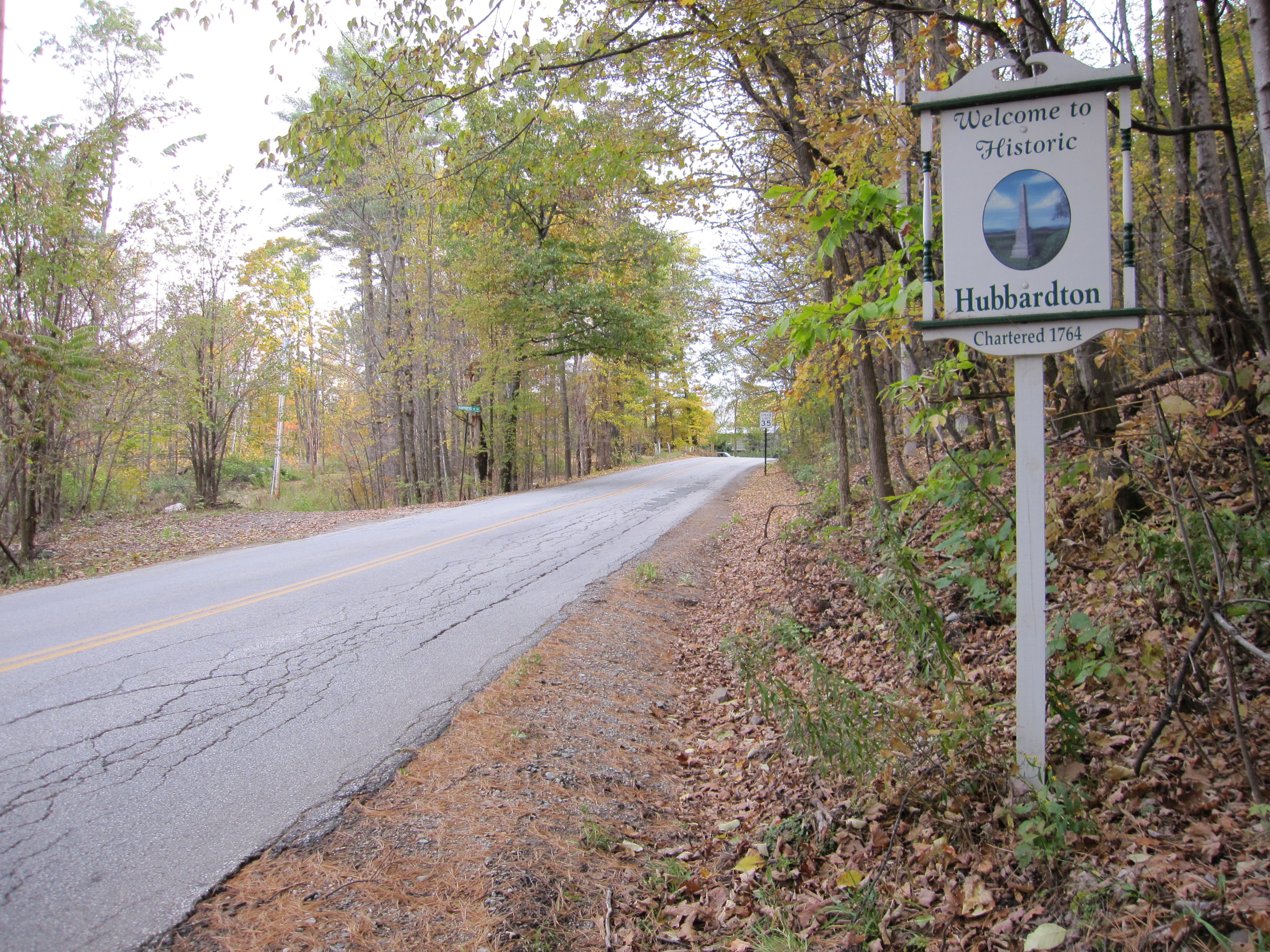
- Sign on Route 144 in Hubbardton

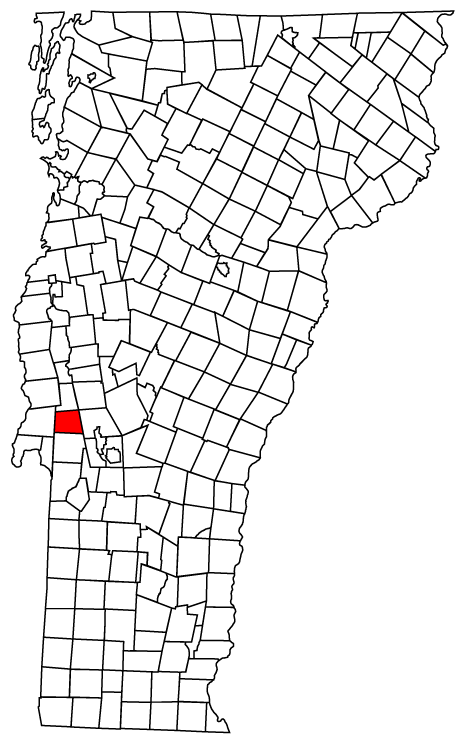
- Hubbardton, Vermont
- Coordinates: 43°43′23″N 73°09′20″W
- Country: United States
- State: Vermont
- County: Rutland
- Communities: East Hubbardton; Hortonia; Hubbardton

Area
  - Total: 28.8 sq mi (74.7 km^{2})
  - Land: 27.5 sq mi (71.3 km^{2})
  - Water: 1.4 sq mi (3.5 km^{2})
- Elevation: 640 ft (200 m)

Population (2020)
  - Total: 735
  - Density: 26.7/sq mi (10.3/km^{2})
- Time zone: UTC-5 (Eastern (EST))
  - Summer (DST): UTC-4 (EDT)
- ZIP Codes: 05735 (Castleton); 05743 (Fair Haven); 05732 (Bomoseen); 05733 (Brandon)
- Area code: 802
- FIPS code: 50-34450
- GNIS feature ID: 1462120

Hubbardton is a town in Rutland County, Vermont, United States. The town was named for Thomas Hubbard, a landholder. The population was 735 at the 2020 census.

The town was the site of the Battle of Hubbardton, where British forces attacked Americans during the Saratoga Campaign of 1777.

== Geography ==
According to the United States Census Bureau, the town has a total area of 28.9 square miles (75 km^{2}), of which 27.5 square miles (71 km^{2}) is land and 1.3 square miles (3.4 km^{2}), or 4.61%, is water. Lake Hortonia and Beebe Pond are two of the larger bodies of water in the town.

== Demographics ==
Historical population
Census	Pop.	Note	%±
1790	404		—
1800	641		58.7%
1810	724		12.9%
1820	810		11.9%
1830	865		6.8%
1840	719		−16.9%
1850	701		−2.5%
1860	606		−13.6%
1870	606		0.0%
1880	533		−12.0%
1890	506		−5.1%
1900	488		−3.6%
1910	455		−6.8%
1920	328		−27.9%
1930	307		−6.4%
1940	346		12.7%
1950	332		−4.0%
1960	238		−28.3%
1970	228		−4.2%
1980	490		114.9%
1990	576		17.6%
2000	752		30.6%
2010	706		−6.1%
2020	735		4.1%
U.S. Decennial Census

At the 2000 census there were 752 people, 296 households, and 203 families in the town. The population density was 27.3 people per square mile (10.6/km^{2}). There were 580 housing units at an average density of 21.1 per square mile (8.1/km^{2}). The racial makeup of the town was 95.61% White, 1.33% African American, 0.40% Native American, 0.40% Asian, 0.13% Pacific Islander, 0.93% from other races, and 1.20% from two or more races. Hispanic or Latino of any race were 1.60%.

Of the 296 households 29.4% had children under the age of 18 living with them, 57.1% were married couples living together, 5.7% had a female householder with no husband present, and 31.1% were non-families. 21.3% of households were one person and 6.8% were one person aged 65 or older. The average household size was 2.54 and the average family size was 2.96.

The age distribution was 22.7% under the age of 18, 7.6% from 18 to 24, 27.4% from 25 to 44, 31.8% from 45 to 64, and 10.5% 65 or older. The median age was 40 years. For every 100 females, there were 106.6 males. For every 100 females age 18 and over, there were 106.8 males.

The median household income was $37,647 and the median family income was $39,485. Males had a median income of $30,982 versus $19,583 for females. The per capita income for the town was $19,276. About 6.3% of families and 13.0% of the population were below the poverty line, including 16.7% of those under age 18 and 2.4% of those age 65 or over.

== Notable person ==
- Horace Holmes Thomas, lawyer, Union Army officer, state legislator and House Speaker in Illinois
