= List of high schools in Vermont =

This is a list of high schools in the state of Vermont.

== Addison County ==
- Middlebury Union High School, Middlebury
- Mount Abraham Union High School, Bristol
- Vergennes Union High School, Vergennes

== Bennington County ==
- Arlington Memorial School, Arlington
- Burr and Burton Academy, Manchester (private)
- Long Trail School, Dorset
- Mount Anthony Union High School, Bennington

== Caledonia County ==
- Burke Mountain Academy, East Burke (private)
- Danville School, Danville
- Hazen Union High School, Hardwick
- Lyndon Institute, Lyndon Center (private)
- St. Johnsbury Academy, St. Johnsbury (private)

== Chittenden County ==
- Champlain Valley Union High School, Hinesburg
- Colchester High School, Colchester
- Essex High School, Essex Junction
- Lake Champlain Waldorf High School, Shelburne (private)
- Milton Senior High School, Milton
- Mount Mansfield Union High School, Jericho
- Winooski High School, Winooski

=== Burlington ===
- Burlington High School
- Rock Point School (private)

=== South Burlington ===
- Rice Memorial High School (private)
- South Burlington High School
- Vermont Commons School (private)

== Essex County ==
- Canaan Memorial High School, Canaan

== Franklin County ==
- Bellows Free Academy, Fairfax, Fairfax
- Bellows Free Academy, St. Albans, St. Albans
- Enosburg Falls Middle/High School, Enosburg Falls
- Missisquoi Valley Union Middle/High School, Swanton
- Richford Junior/Senior High School, Richford

== Lamoille County ==
- Lamoille Union High School, Hyde Park
- Peoples Academy, Morrisville

=== Stowe ===
- Mt. Mansfield Ski Club & Academy (private)
- Stowe High School

== Orange County ==
- Blue Mountain Union School, Wells River
- The Mountain School, Vershire (private)
- Oxbow Union High School, Bradford
- Randolph Union High School, Randolph
- Thetford Academy, Thetford (private)
- Williamstown High School, Williamstown

== Orleans County ==
- Craftsbury Academy, Craftsbury
- Lake Region Union High School, Orleans

=== Newport ===
- North Country Union High School
- United Christian Academy (private)

== Rutland County ==
- Fair Haven Union High School, Fair Haven
- Killington Mountain School, Killington
- Mill River Union High School, North Clarendon
- Otter Valley Union High School, Brandon
- Poultney High School, Poultney
- Proctor Junior/Senior High School, Proctor
- West Rutland School, West Rutland

=== Rutland ===
- Mount St. Joseph Academy (private)
- Rutland Area Christian School (private)
- Rutland High School
- Stafford Technical Center

== Washington County ==
- Cabot School, Cabot
- Green Mountain Valley School, Fayston
- Harwood Union High School, Duxbury
- Northfield High School, Northfield
- Spaulding High School, Barre
- Twinfield Union School, Plainfield
- Union 32 High School, East Montpelier

=== Montpelier ===
- Montpelier High School
- Pacem School (private)

== Windham County ==
- Bellows Falls Union High School, Bellows Falls
- Brattleboro Union High School, Brattleboro
- Leland & Gray Union High School, Townshend
- Stratton Mountain School, Stratton Mountain (private)
- Twin Valley High School, Wilmington
- Vermont Academy, Saxtons River (private)

=== Putney ===
- The Greenwood School (private)
- The Putney School (private)

== Windsor County ==
- Green Mountain Union High School, Chester
- Hartford High School, White River Junction
- Mid Vermont Christian School, Quechee
- Okemo Mountain School, Ludlow
- The Sharon Academy, Sharon
- White River Valley High School, South Royalton
- Windsor High School, Windsor
- Woodstock Union High School, Woodstock

=== Springfield ===
- River Valley Technical Center
- Springfield High School

== See also ==
- List of school districts in Vermont
