= Vermont Sustainable Heating Initiative =

- Founded: 2008
- Founder: Thomas Tailer, Jessie-Ruth Corkins, Courtney Devoid, Thomas Dickerson, Henry Webb, Sam Bevet, Galen Helms, Christi Kroll Lucia Bragg, Anne Watson
- Purpose: Sustainability
- Location: Bristol, Vermont, United States
- Region served: Addison County, Chittenden County, Washington County
- Key people: Thomas and Elizabeth Tailer, Anne Watson, Torin Olivetti, Jessie-Ruth Corkins, Courtney Devoid, Thomas Dickerson, Robert Donnis
- Website: http://www.sustainableheatingvt.org/ (archived)

Vermont Sustainable Heating Initiative (commonly referred to as VSHI) was a non-profit organization that worked to establish sustainability in the Vermont heating sector. The organization advocated biomass fuels (especially wood pellets) over fossil fuels. In order to promote sustainability and reduce the expense of home heating for impoverished Vermonters, VSHI installed pellet stoves in low-income houses at no cost. VSHI also advocated for the sustainable development of local biomass sources for fuel.

== History ==
In 2007 a group of students from Mount Abraham Union High School prepared a presentation on the subject of grass energy in Vermont. This presentation discussed both the environmental and economic impact that grass-derived biomass fuels would have on the Vermont economy. As of 2008 VSHI morphed from a loose coalition of students and educators to a state-registered nonprofit corporation.

In 2009 VSHI prepared a grant proposal in an attempt to obtain $30,000 to fund a feasibility study into solid biomass fuels. The proposal received support from a number of towns and was approved. As of 2010 VSHI has launched the Chittenden County Solid Biofuels Feasibility Study using the grant money in cooperation with the Chittenden County Regional Planning Comm. and The Biomass Energy Research Center.

In 2016, VSHI was formally dissolved.

== Pellet stoves ==
As part of its regular operations, VSHI works with LIHEAP recipients to place pellet stoves with low-income Vermont households. VSHI reviews applications from recipients in Addison, Chittenden, and Washington Counties and gives out pellet stoves in the fall accordingly. A over 20 pellet stoves have been given away to date. The cooperation with LIHEAP is currently run as a pilot project, but VSHI hopes to expand it in the future.
