= Vegimals =

Vegimal or Vegimals may refer to:

- Part-animal, part-vegetable creatures on the children's book and television series Octonauts.
- A plush toy brand of the defunct Freemountain Toys of Vermont, US
