= Jake Eaton =

American football player (born 1981)

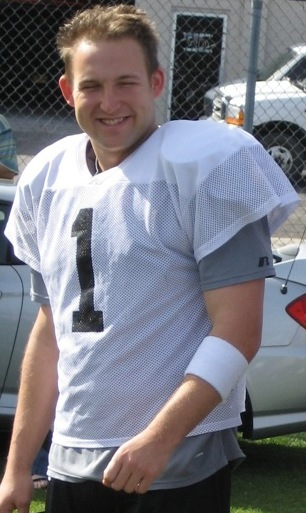
- Eaton with the Orlando Predators in 2007

Profile
- Position: Quarterback

Personal information
- Born: February 11, 1981 (age 45); Rutland, Vermont, U.S.
- Listed height: 6 ft 2 in (1.88 m)
- Listed weight: 215 lb (98 kg)

Career information
- High school: Rutland
- College: Maine (1999–2002)

Career history
- Edmonton Eskimos (2004)*; Cape Fear Wildcats (2004); Manchester Wolves (2005); Orlando Predators (2006–2009)
- * Offseason or practice squad member only

Career AFL statistics
- Comp. / Att.: 79 / 118
- Passing yards: 958
- TD–INT: 16–7
- QB rating: 100.88
- Rushing TDs: 2
- Stats at ArenaFan.com

Jake Eaton (born February 11, 1981) an American former professional football quarterback. He is currently a high school athletic director in Proctor, Vermont. He played in the af2 with the Cape Fear Wildcats in 2004 and the Manchester Wolves in 2005. He went on to the Arena Football League in 2006 and played for the Orlando Predators before retiring in 2009. Eaton was inducted into the University of Maine Sports Hall of Fame in 2016.

== Early life ==
Eaton was born on February 11, 1981, in Rutland, Vermont. During his childhood, Eaton lived with both of his parents after their divorce. He competed in athletics and softball before attending Rutland High School. At Rutland, Eaton totaled 1,582 points in basketball. As a gridiron football player, Eaton amassed over 5,000 passing yards and over 50 touchdowns.

At Vermont Division I championships, Eaton led Rutland to the high school championship game in 1996. His team would win the championship game held that year. The following year, Eaton won the high school title in 1997 with Rutland. He also reached the final with Rutland in 1998. For the Division I basketball championship, Rutland and Eaton made it to the semifinals in 1999. Outside of sports, Eaton was interested in working with children for his career.

== College career ==
At the University of Maine from 1999 to 2002, Eaton played for the Maine Black Bears football team. As a quarterback, Eaton replaced injured teammate Brian Scott in 1999 for five games. Eaton was the season leader in passing yards from 2000 to 2002. With 7,145 passing yards, Eaton was in the top five for career passing yards with Maine during 2022.

During these seasons, Eaton and Maine were defeated in the quarterfinals of the 2001 NCAA Division I-AA football playoffs. In November 2002, Eaton broke his medial collateral ligament. Due to his knee, Eaton did not quarterback the Maine players that reached the quarterfinals of the 2002 NCAA Division I-AA football playoffs. After leaving the team in 2002, Eaton had 77 combined touchdowns with his rushes and passes.

== Professional career ==
After college, Eaton became part of the Edmonton Eskimos in April 2004. He remained with the Canadian Football League team until he lost his spot in June 2004. That year, Eaton went to the af2 and played in three games with the Cape Fear Wildcats. He then moved to the Manchester Wolves in 2005 and totaled 4,006 yards alongside 88 touchdowns.

In 2006, Eaton joined the Arena Football League as a member of the Orlando Predators. During his time with the Predators, Eaton underwent medical treatment for his multiple knee injuries in 2008. As a quarterback until 2009, Eaton had a career total of 958 passing yards and 16 touchdowns. After ending his football career, Eaton became an elementary school gym teacher and high school athletic director in Proctor, Vermont, during the 2010s.

== Awards and honors ==
For Rutland, Eaton won the Gatorade Player of the Year for Vermont in 1998 and 1999. While with the Maine football team, Eaton was offensive player of the year for the university in 2000. Eaton was also one of the winners of the Most Valuable Player award for Maine from 2001 to 2002. Eaton was inducted into the University of Maine Sports Hall of Fame in 2016. In 2017, he was selected to join a hall of fame for the Vermont Principals' Association. Eaton was also chosen to become part of the Vermont Sports Hall of Fame in 2023.
