= The Tillerman =

Restaurant in Bristol, Vermont, U.S.

- Interactive map of The Tillerman

Restaurant information
- Location: 1868 N. 116 Rd, Bristol, Vermont, 05443, United States
- Coordinates: 44°09′17″N 73°02′45″W
- Website: thetillermanvt.com

The Tillerman is a restaurant in Bristol, Vermont. It was included in The New York Times's 2024 list of the 22 best pizzerias in the U.S.
