= Stafford Technical Center =

Stafford Technical Center of Vermont
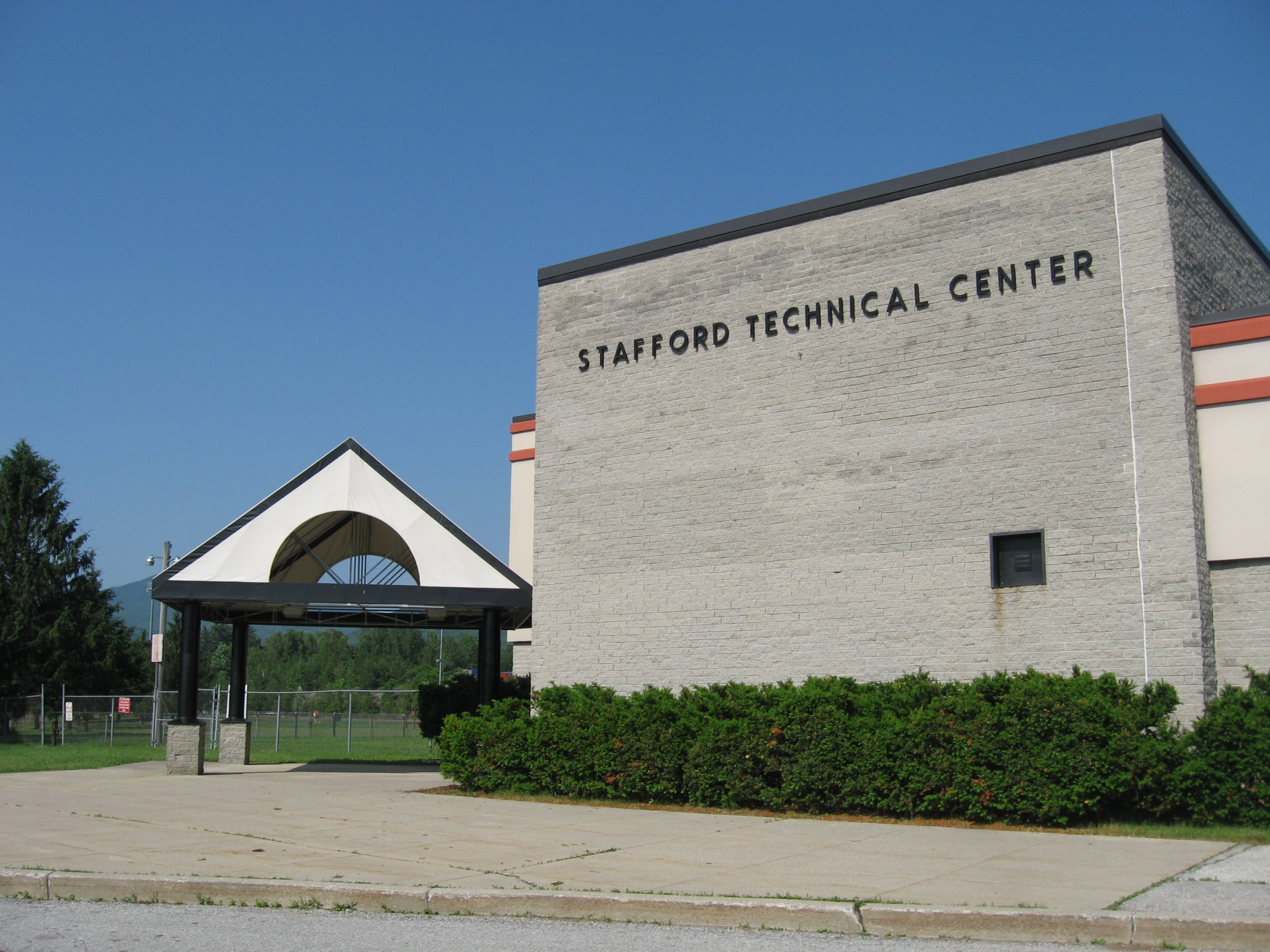

Location
- Rutland, Vermont 05701; United States; 43°37′6.2″N 72°57′18″W

Information
- School type: Technical Center
- Established: 1974
- School district: Rutland City Public Schools
- Superintendent: Bill Olsen
- Director: Melissa Conner
- Grades: 10, 11, 12

Stafford Technical Center is a technical school adjacent to Rutland High School, located in Rutland, Vermont.

The school offers programs such as culinary arts, engineering, forestry and natural resources, video production, automotive technology, and cosmetology. There are 14 different full-day technical programs. When students enroll in one of these programs they spend the full school day at Stafford Technical Center, while continuing to be enrolled at their partner high school. The programs start at 9:15 am and run until 2:30 pm. Students may take additional academic classes at Stafford Technical Center or Rutland High School. Transportation to Stafford Technical Center is provided by the student's partner high school. Evening classes are held for adult learners and are available to anyone sixteen years of age or older. It is similar to the BOCES program in New York State.

The school is part of the Rutland City Public School District, but also allows students from other towns in Rutland County to attend. Several hundred students are currently in attendance.

Stafford students are heavily involved in local events and charity. Every two years the school builds, and sells at-cost, a home designed and built by students of several programs. The daycare program run by students also helps collect and donate children's clothing and winter accessories. The school's culinary arts program participates in preparing food for a variety of local charities. The cosmetology students have visited senior care centers and given manicures to the residents. Many students are able to participate in work based learning while in school.

During the global pandemic of 2020 the school pivoted quickly in March 2020 to a fully remote instruction model. Early September 2020 the school started the year in a hybrid model with students attending every other day in person with online learning on the opposite day.
