= Marble Street Historic District =

Historic district in Vermont, United States

- U.S. National Register of Historic Places
- U.S. Historic district
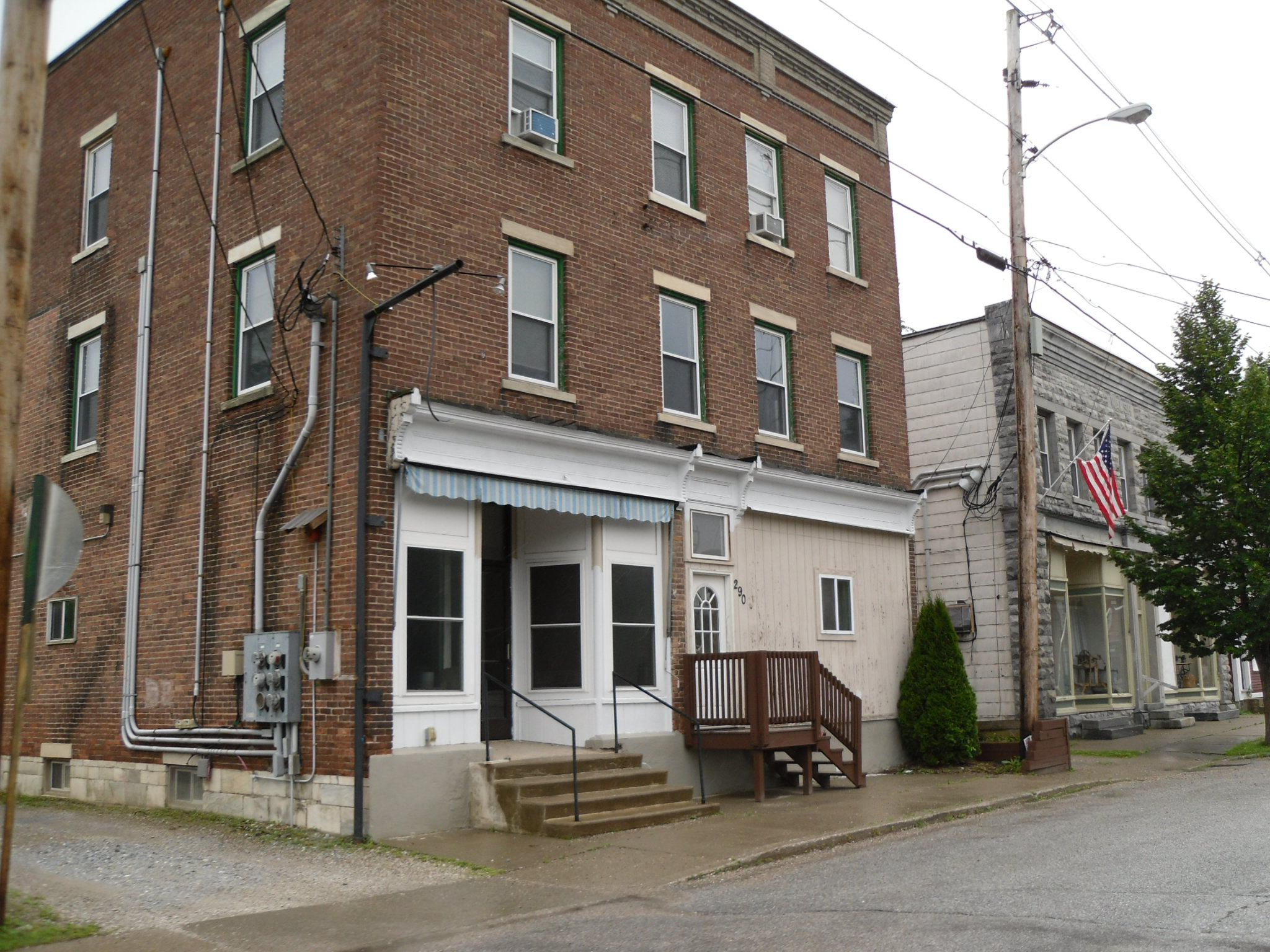

- Location within Vermont Location within the United States
- Location: 87-132 Marble St. and 10 Smith Ave., West Rutland, Vermont
- Coordinates: 43°35′52″N 73°2′58″W
- Area: 3.5 acres (1.4 ha)
- Built: 1903
- Architectural style: Classical Revival, Italianate, Commercial Style
- NRHP reference No.: 90000338
- Added to NRHP: March 1, 1990

The Marble Street Historic District encompasses what was once the principal business district of West Rutland, Vermont. Centered on Marble Street between Thrall Avenue and Smith Place, this area was the town's economic hub during the years (roughly 1885 to 1935) when the local marble quarries dominated the local economy. The area has also been bypassed as a transportation route, resulting in the preservation of a number of period commercial buildings. The district was listed on the National Register of Historic Places in 1990.

== Description and history ==
The West Rutland area, part of Rutland until 1886, was until the 1830s considered a poor agricultural area, due to swampy conditions and the presence of marble not far below the surface. The value of the marble was then realized, and in 1844 the first quarry was opened. Production expanded, with additional quarries opened, especially after the railroad arrived in 1851. Marble Street was laid out in 1853, at first primarily a transportation route to and from the quarries, with the swampy terrain limiting development. The swamps were gradually filled in, and commercial development expanded significantly in the 1880s. A major fire in 1903 destroyed a significant number of commercial buildings, resulting in a new wave of construction. The area began a decline with the closure of many of the quarries in the 1930s, and the road was bypassed as a transportation route by the construction of the present alignment of United States Route 4 to the south. The latter event in particular served to save the area from the redevelopment that often affects commercial areas, resulting in a well-preserved collection of commercial buildings built between the 1880s and the 1930s.

The historic district is centered on what is basically a one-block stretch of Marble Street, bounded on the northwest by Smith Place and the southeast by Thrall Avenue. It extends on the south side slightly past Thrall Ave., and on the north side slightly past Smith Place, and includes one house on Smith Place. There are ten commercial buildings and four houses in the district. The most imposing commercial building is the three-story brick Shirt Waist Factory building; all of the other buildings are no more than 2-1/2 stories in height. The buildings for the most part have uniform setbacks and scaling, in part because the rebuilding after the 1903 fire maintained setbacks of destroyed buildings. Most of the buildings are stylistically in retardaire (out of current fashion for the period) versions of the Italianate, with scrolled brackets and deeper eaves.

== See also ==
- National Register of Historic Places listings in Rutland County, Vermont
