= Rutland City School District =

School in Rutland, Vermont, United States

Rutland City Public Schools
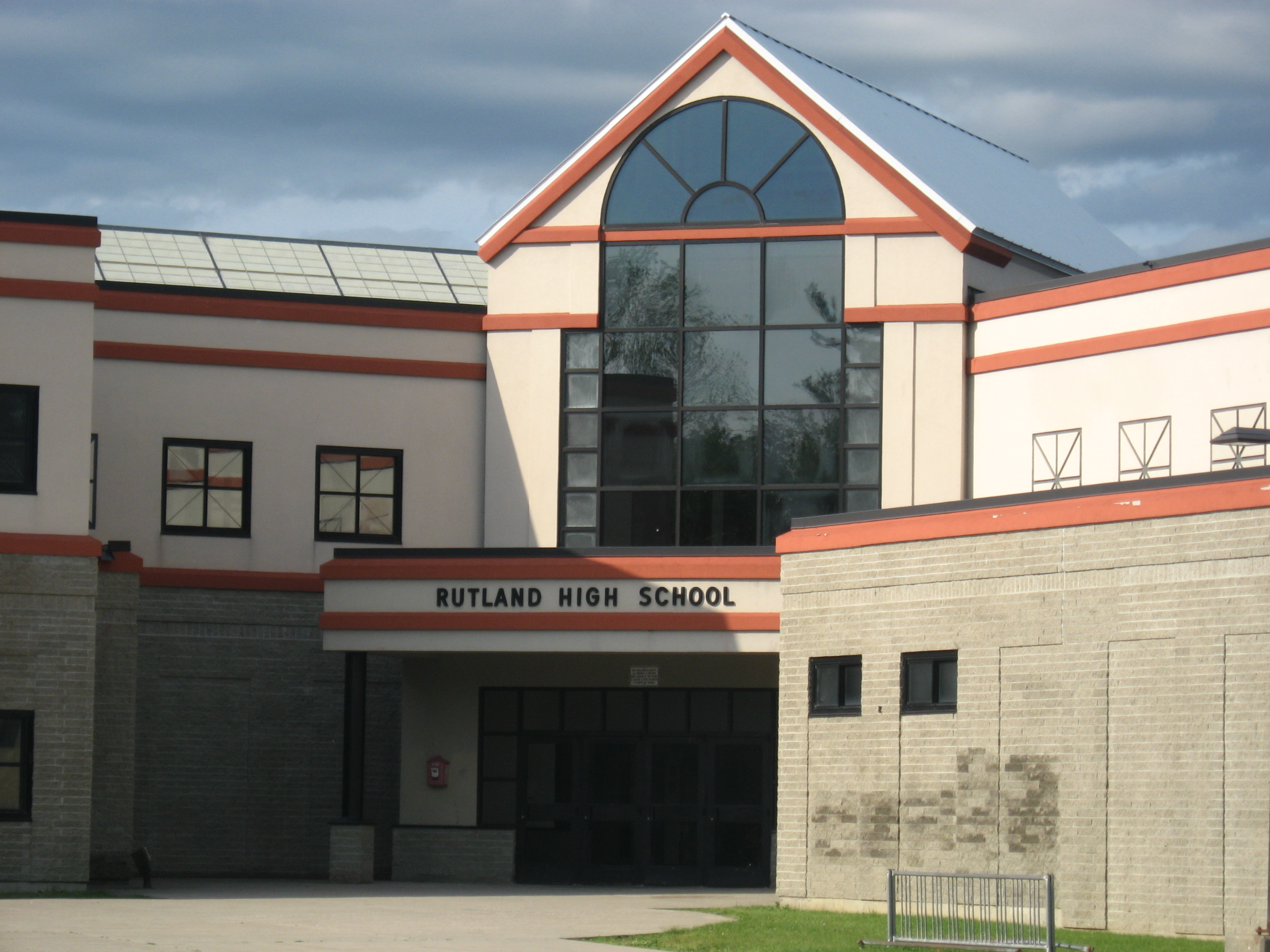
- Rutland High School Entrance

Address
- 6 Church Street Rutland, Vermont, 05701; United States
- Coordinates: 43°36′30″N 72°58′39″W

District information
- Motto: Every Student, Every Day!
- Grades: K-12
- Established: 1855; 171 years ago
- Superintendent: Pam Reed
- NCES District ID: 5099940

Students and staff
- Enrollment: 2,012 (2020-2021)
- Staff: 165.00 (on an FTE basis)
- Student–teacher ratio: 12.19
- District mascot: none
- Colors

Other information
- Website: rutlandcitypublicschools.org

Rutland City Public Schools is the school district that manages public schools in Rutland City, Vermont, United States.

== Budget ==
- 2019-2020 $54.7 million
- 2018-2019 $52.6 million
- 2009-2010 $45 million
- 2008-09 $43 million
- 2007-08 $40 million.

== Schools ==
- Northeast Primary
- Northwest Primary
- Rutland Intermediate School
- Rutland Middle School
- Rutland High School
- RMS/RHS Allen Street Campus
- Stafford Technical Center
