= West Rutland School =

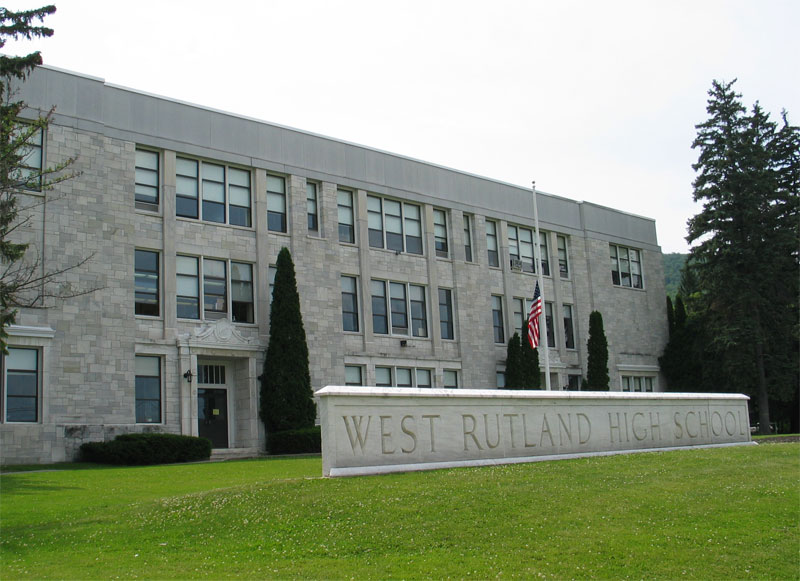

Location
- 713 Main Street; West Rutland, Vermont 05777; United States
- Coordinates: 43°35′44.433″N 73°3′3.6894″W

Information
- Type: Public
- School district: Greater Rutland County Supervisory Union
- Principal: Jay Slenker
- Faculty: 35.56 (on FTE basis)
- Grades: PK to 12
- Enrollment: 340 (2015-16)
- Student to teacher ratio: 10.07
- Colors: Green and Gold
- Website: wrs.grcsu.org

The West Rutland School is a public secondary school located in Rutland County, Vermont. The school serves about 360 students.
