= Pacem School =

U.S. school

Pacem School is an independent alternative middle and high school in Montpelier, Vermont. The name of the school is derived from the Latin word "pacem", which means "peace".

== History ==
=== Early Years (2006 - 2011) ===
In 2006, Pacem Learning Community (PLC) started offering classes to home-schooled students in Central Vermont. In the subsequent year (2007), the PLC changed its location to Vermont College of Fine Arts (VCFA). This location change first put Pacem in the capital of Vermont and a cultural hub.

=== Pacem's Independence (2012 - Present Day) ===
In February 2012, Pacem was recognized by the Vermont Department of Education to open as a State Recognized and independent high school. This change had a board and circle meeting to change the name from Pacem Learning Community to Pacem School. When Pacem became an approved independent school in 2015, this made the school eligible for tuition payments from towns without their own secondary schools under Vermont's school choice program. In response to the COVID-19 pandemic, Pacem School in Montpelier, Vermont implemented outdoor classrooms equipped with tents, tarpaulin covers, power, and Wi-Fi to facilitate socially distanced learning while fostering environmental engagement.
