= Freemountain Toys =

American Toy Company

Freemountain Toys, Inc. was a company based in Bristol, Vermont that produced anthropomorphic vegetables and fruits called Vegimals and other plush toys and hats with stuffed appendages.

== History ==
The company was founded in 1975 by Beverly Red in her home in Burlington and moved from there to a loft, then a storefront and finally to a former grist mill in Bristol that was renamed the Vegimill. In 1978 the company's gross income was almost $6 million. Products were sewn by as many as 140 local women in addition to a staff of ten at the Vegimill, where the grain bins were used in cutting, assembling, and boxing merchandise.

In June 1980, Red sold Freemountain to Michael Balser. The company's trademarks have since expired.

== Products ==
=== Vegimals ===
Vegimals, the company's initial product, were velour and fur-covered vegetables and fruits, some with Velcro fastenings, which had embroidered faces. They included peas in a zippered pod (the most popular product), a tomato, a stalk of broccoli, a cauliflower, a giant carrot, a slice of watermelon with removable stuffed seeds, an olive with removable pit, a peelable and segmentable orange, a shuckable ear of corn, two peanuts in a peanut shell, and a banana with Velcro-fastened peel. Non-vegetable, non-fruit characters included an egg that unzipped to release a stuffed fried egg, a zippered can containing four Velcro-attached sardines, animals such as a fish inside a fish inside another fish, a whale with a baby inside, a mother sheep with lamb, and "Emile Bearhart" with a pocket containing a red velour heart, and also an 11-inch velour pyramid containing a blue velour mummy. In 1978 the company was producing 43 different types of Vegimal.

=== Hats ===
The company started producing baseball caps with stuffed wings after Red made one for herself. A separate division, Freemountain hats, produced caps with horns, antennae, and lightning bolts sewn on in addition to wings, with considerable sales success.

== Awards ==
Freemountain was awarded a certificate of commendation by the Public Action Coalition on Toys for its safe, imaginative products in non-sexist packaging and inspiring constructive and non-violent play.

== Current influences ==
The United States Department of Agriculture National Agricultural Library includes several Vegimals in its library of educational materials, to assist pre-school and elementary-school children in learning about foodstuffs.

The Peas in a Pod in the 2010 movie Toy Story 3 and the 2011 animated short Hawaiian Vacation are based on the Vegimal peas.
