= West Rutland, Vermont =

- Town
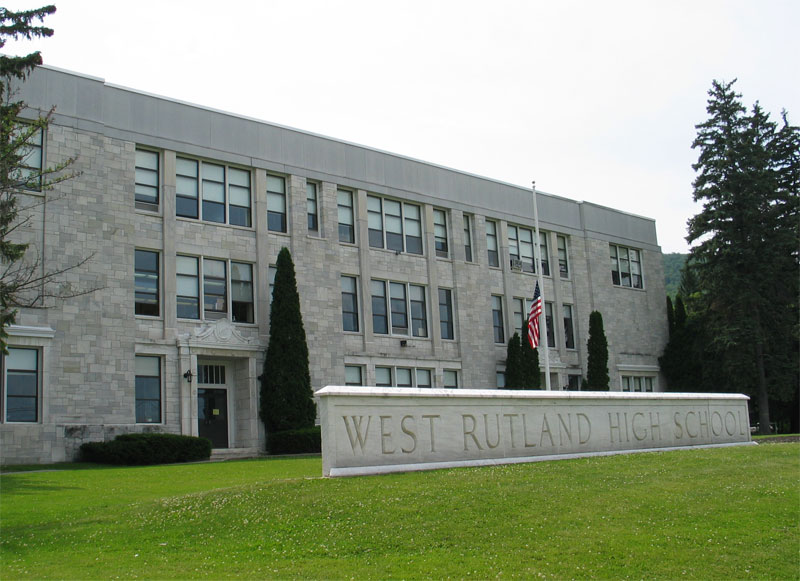
- High school in West Rutland

- Logo

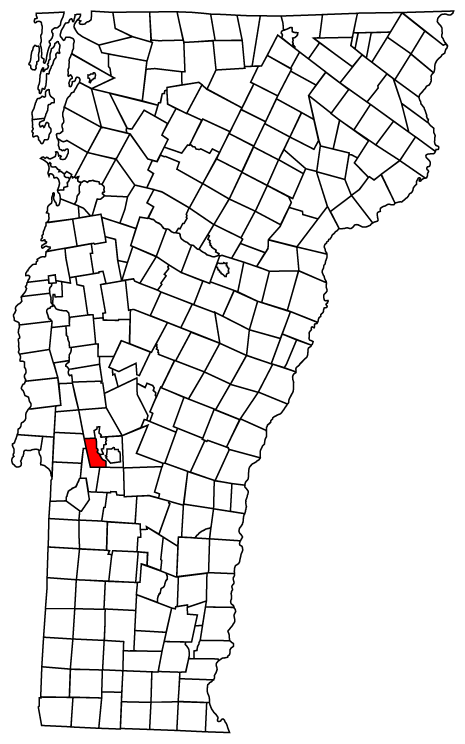
- West Rutland, Vermont
- Coordinates: 43°37′45″N 73°04′12″W
- Country: United States
- State: Vermont
- County: Rutland
- Chartered: 1886
- Communities: West Rutland

Area
  - Total: 18.0 sq mi (46.6 km^{2})
  - Land: 18.0 sq mi (46.6 km^{2})
  - Water: 0 sq mi (0.0 km^{2})
- Elevation: 486 ft (148 m)

Population (2020)
  - Total: 2,214
  - Density: 123/sq mi (47.5/km^{2})
- Time zone: UTC-5 (Eastern (EST))
  - Summer (DST): UTC-4 (EDT)
- ZIP Codes: 05777 (West Rutland); 05744 (Florence); 05735 (Castleton)
- Area code: 802
- FIPS code: 50-82300
- GNIS feature ID: 1462256
- Website: www.westrutlandvt.org

West Rutland is a town in Rutland County, Vermont, United States. The population was 2,214 at the 2020 census. The town center, located in the south-central portion of the town and where about 87% of the population resides, is defined by the U.S. Census Bureau as a census-designated place (CDP). The town is part of the Rutland micropolitan NECTA.

== History ==
The town of Rutland was originally granted in 1761 as one of the New Hampshire Grants and named after Rutland, Massachusetts, the home of the first grantee, John Murrey. It was one of the most successful of those grants because of excellent farmland and gentle topography.

In 1863, there was rioting in West Rutland after the state instituted a draft.

During a strike in 1868, owners evicted Irish-Catholic workers from company-owned homes, then imported dozens of French-Canadian Catholic "strikebreakers" to replace them.

West Rutland petitioned the Vermont legislature to separate from East Rutland. On November 19, 1886, West Rutland was incorporated as its own town.

=== Marble industry ===
In the early 19th century, small high-quality marble deposits were discovered in Rutland, and in the 1830s a large deposit of nearly solid marble of high quality was found in what is now West Rutland. By the 1840s small firms had begun operations, but marble quarries only became profitable when the railroad arrived in 1851. At the same time, the famous quarries of Carrara in Tuscany, Italy, became largely unworkable because of their extreme depth, and Rutland quickly became one of the leading producers of marble in the world.

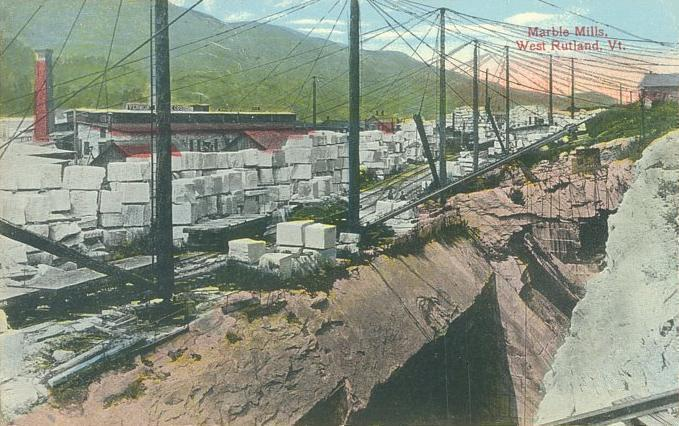
Marble mills c. 1915

This fueled enough growth and investment that in 1886 the marble companies saw to it that when the present Rutland City was incorporated, most of the remainder of the town was split off as West Rutland and Proctor.

The Marble Street Historic District was added to the National Register of Historic Places in 1990.

== Demographics ==
Historical population
Census	Pop.	Note	%±
1880	2,379		—
1890	3,680		54.7%
1900	2,914		−20.8%
1910	3,427		17.6%
1920	3,391		−1.1%
1930	3,421		0.9%
1940	2,922		−14.6%
1950	2,487		−14.9%
1960	2,302		−7.4%
1970	2,381		3.4%
1980	2,351		−1.3%
1990	2,448		4.1%
2000	2,535		3.6%
2010	2,326		−8.2%
2020	2,214		−4.8%
U.S. Decennial Census

At the 2010 census, there were 2,326 people, 1,691 households, and 1166 families in the town. The population density was 72.0 people per square mile (27.8 people/km^{2}). There were 1,079 housing units at an average density of 60.38 units per square mile (23.31 units/km^{2}). The racial makeup of the town was 96.9%% White, 0.5% African American, 0.4% Native American, 1.7% Asian, 0.04% are Pacific Islander, 0.04% from other races, and 0.8% from two or more races. 0.7% of the population were Hispanic or Latino of any race.

Of the 1,021 households 30.1% had children under the age of 18 living with them, 52.8% were married couples living together, 10.1% had a female householder with no husband present, and 32.8% were non-families. 25.9% of households were one person and 12.7% were one person aged 65 or older. The average household size was 2.48 and the average family size was 3.00.

The age distribution was 23.8% under the age of 18, 6.6% from 18 to 24, 29.8% from 25 to 44, 24.7% from 45 to 64, and 15.1% 65 or older. The median age was 39.0 years. For every 100 females, there were 96.1 males. For every 100 females age 18 and over, there were 95.0 males.

The median household income was $67,389 and the median family income was $71,955. Males had a median income of $30,962 versus $21,935 for females. The per capita income for the town was $17,325. 14.7% of the population and 11.2% of families were below the poverty line. Out of the total people living in poverty, 60.8% are under the age of 18 and 9.2% are 65 or older.

Of the 913 households 29.7% had children under the age of 18 living with them, 51.2% were married couples living together, 10.4% had a female householder with no husband present, and 34.2% were non-families. 27.2% of households were one person and 13.3% were one person aged 65 or older. The average household size was 2.48 and the average family size was 3.03.

The age distribution was 24.0% under the age of 18, 7.1% from 18 to 24, 29.7% from 25 to 44, 24.6% from 45 to 64, and 14.6% 65 or older. The median age was 39 years. For every 100 females, there were 97.0 males. For every 100 females age 18 and over, there were 95.1 males.

The median household income was $37,204 and the median family income was $41,795. Males had a median income of $30,861 versus $21,936 for females. The per capita income for the CDP was $17,144. About 6.7% of families and 11.1% of the population were below the poverty line, including 16.3% of those under age 18 and 7.3% of those age 65 or over.

== Geography ==
Drained by the Clarendon River, West Rutland lies between the Taconic Range and the Green Mountains. According to the United States Census Bureau, the town has a total area of 17.87 square miles (46.3 km^{2}).

=== Town center ===
The boundaries of the town center as defined by the U.S. Census Bureau are as follows: U.S. Route 4 and some power lines on the west; Dewey Avenue on the southwest; Ira town line on the south; the Clarendon River on the southeast; the Rutland town line on the east; the Proctor town line on the northeast and more power lines on the north and northwest. The area of the CDP is 3.7 square miles (9.6 km^{2}), roughly 21% of the total area of the town.

=== Climate ===
The Köppen Climate Classification subtype for this climate is "Dfb" (Warm Summer Continental Climate).

Climate data for West Rutland, Vermont
Month	Jan	Feb	Mar	Apr	May	Jun	Jul	Aug	Sep	Oct	Nov	Dec	Year
Mean daily maximum °F (°C)	30 (−1)	33 (1)	42 (6)	56 (13)	68 (20)	77 (25)	81 (27)	79 (26)	71 (22)	60 (16)	47 (8)	34 (1)	57 (14)
Daily mean °F (°C)	20 (−7)	22 (−6)	32 (0)	45 (7)	56 (13)	65 (18)	69 (21)	68 (20)	60 (16)	49 (9)	38 (3)	26 (−3)	46 (8)
Mean daily minimum °F (°C)	11 (−12)	12 (−11)	22 (−6)	33 (1)	44 (7)	53 (12)	58 (14)	56 (13)	48 (9)	38 (3)	29 (−2)	17 (−8)	35 (2)
Average precipitation inches (mm)	2.4 (61)	2.0 (51)	2.5 (64)	2.8 (71)	3.5 (89)	3.8 (97)	4.2 (110)	3.8 (97)	3.7 (94)	3.2 (81)	3.1 (79)	2.5 (64)	37.5 (950)
Average precipitation days	12	10	11	11	13	12	11	11	10	11	12	12	136
Source: Weatherbase

== Economy ==
Although the closing of the marble quarries in the area in the 1980s and 1990s cost the town many jobs, West Rutland has attracted artists and families looking for a semi-rural lifestyle. Because it is a very rural town, much of its economy is dependent on the city of Rutland. West Rutland has many small businesses, many of which are found on Marble Street, the town's main street. Other businesses include Boardman Hill Farm (including its associated solar farm) and the Carving Studio & Sculpture Center.

== Parks and recreation ==
- The West Rutland Marsh is a designated Important Bird Area by the National Audubon Society and is a popular destination for birdwatching.

== Education ==
The town has a small public school, West Rutland School, that enrolls students from pre-kindergarten to 12th grade. It is part of the Quarry Valley Unified Union School District.

== Transportation ==
The town is crossed by U.S. Route 4, Vermont Route 3, and Vermont Route 4A.

== Notable people ==
- Peter J. Hincks, Vermont State Treasurer
- Harvey H. Johnson, US congressman
- James Patrick Leamy, judge
- George E. Royce, marble company executive and state Senator
- Aldace F. Walker, member of Interstate Commerce Commission and railway president
