= Rutland (city), Vermont =

City in Vermont, United States

Rutland, Vermont
- City
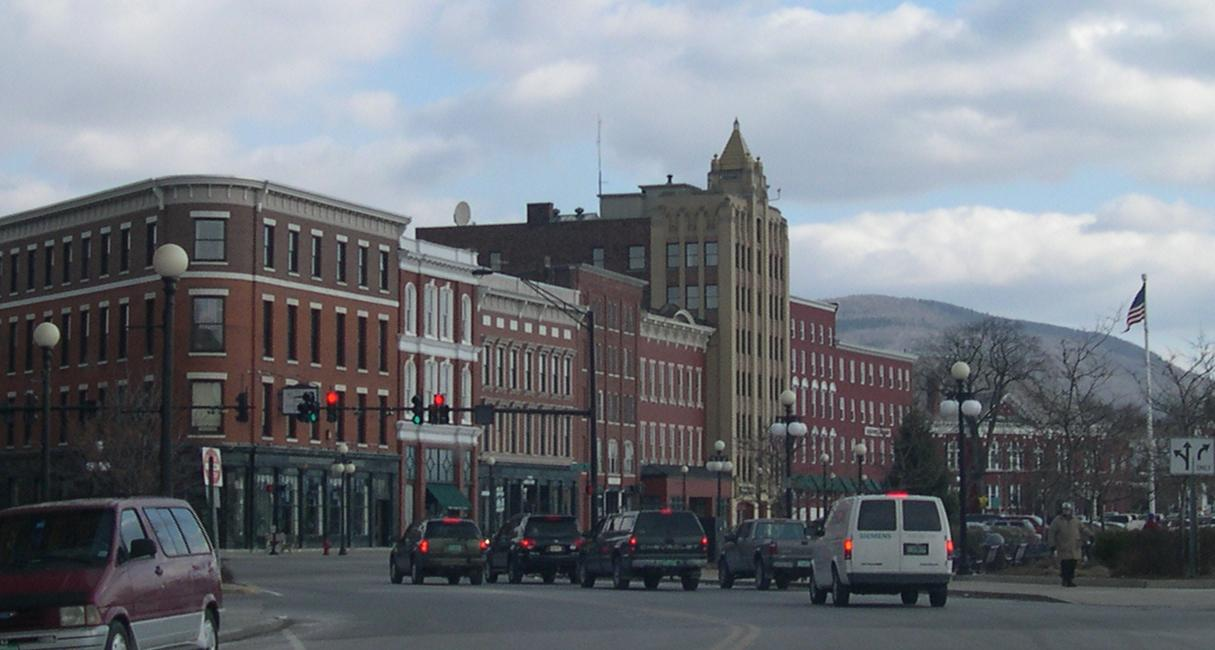
- Downtown Historic District

- Seal
- Nicknames: Marble City, Gateway to Southern Vermont, Rutvegas
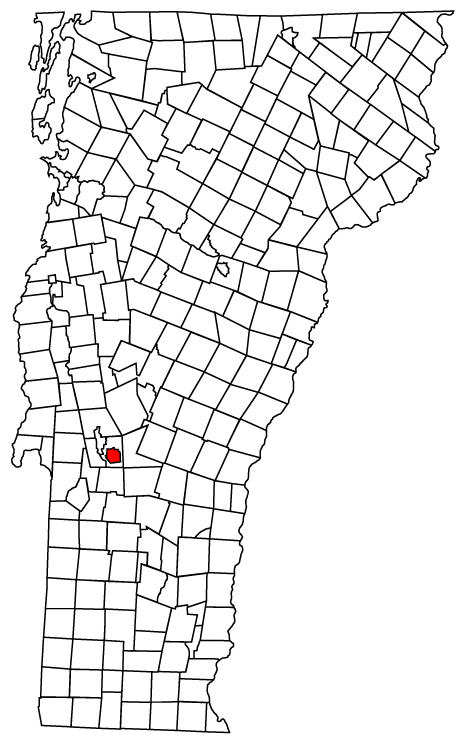
- Location in Vermont
- Coordinates: 43°36′52″N 72°59′26″W
- Country: United States
- State: Vermont
- County: Rutland
- Incorporated: 1892

Area
  - Total: 7.67 sq mi (19.86 km^{2})
  - Land: 7.54 sq mi (19.54 km^{2})
  - Water: 0.13 sq mi (0.33 km^{2})
- Elevation: 541 ft (165 m)

Population (2020)
  - Total: 15,807
  - Density: 2,097.0/sq mi (809.64/km^{2})
- Time zone: UTC-5 (EST)
  - Summer (DST): UTC-4 (EDT)
- ZIP codes: 05701, 05702
- Area code: 802
- FIPS code: 50-61225
- GNIS feature ID: 1462193
- Website: www.rutlandcity.org

Rutland is the only city in and the seat of Rutland County, Vermont, United States. As of the 2020 census, the city had a total population of 15,807. It is located approximately 65 miles (105 km) north of the Massachusetts state line, 35 miles (56 km) west of New Hampshire state line, and 20 miles (32 km) east of the New York state line. Rutland is the third largest city in the state of Vermont after Burlington and South Burlington. Rutland City is completely surrounded by Rutland Town, which is a separate municipality. The downtown area of the city is listed as a historic district on the National Register of Historic Places.

== History ==
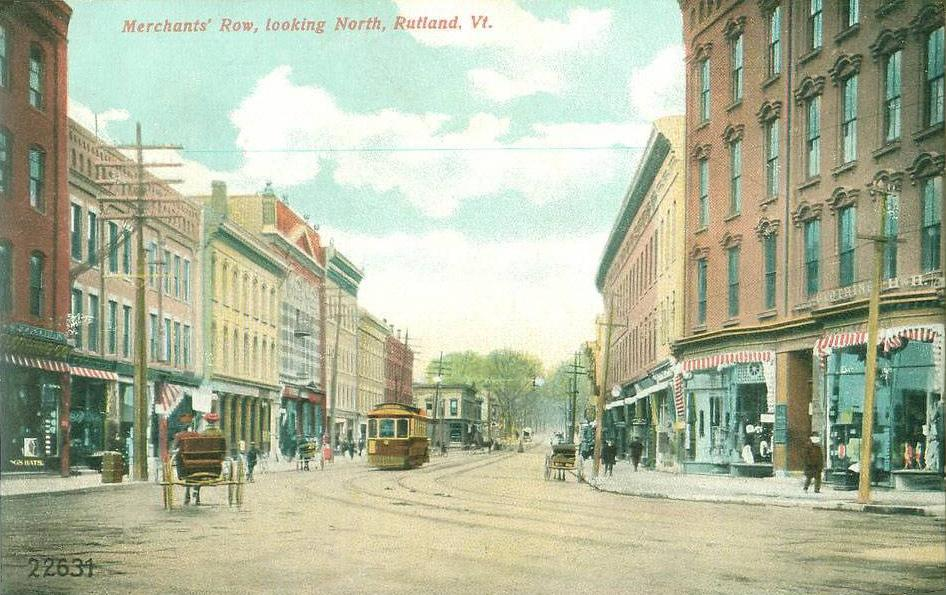
Merchants' Row in 1907

The town of Rutland was chartered in 1761 and named after John Manners, 3rd Duke of Rutland. It was settled in 1770 and served as one of the capitals of the Vermont Republic. In the early 19th century, small high-quality marble deposits were discovered in Rutland, and in the 1830s a large deposit of nearly solid marble was found in what is now West Rutland. By the 1840s, small firms had begun excavations, but marble quarries proved profitable only after the railroad arrived in 1851. Rutland eventually became one of the world's leading marble producers. A large number of Italians with experience in the industry immigrated and brought their families to Rutland.

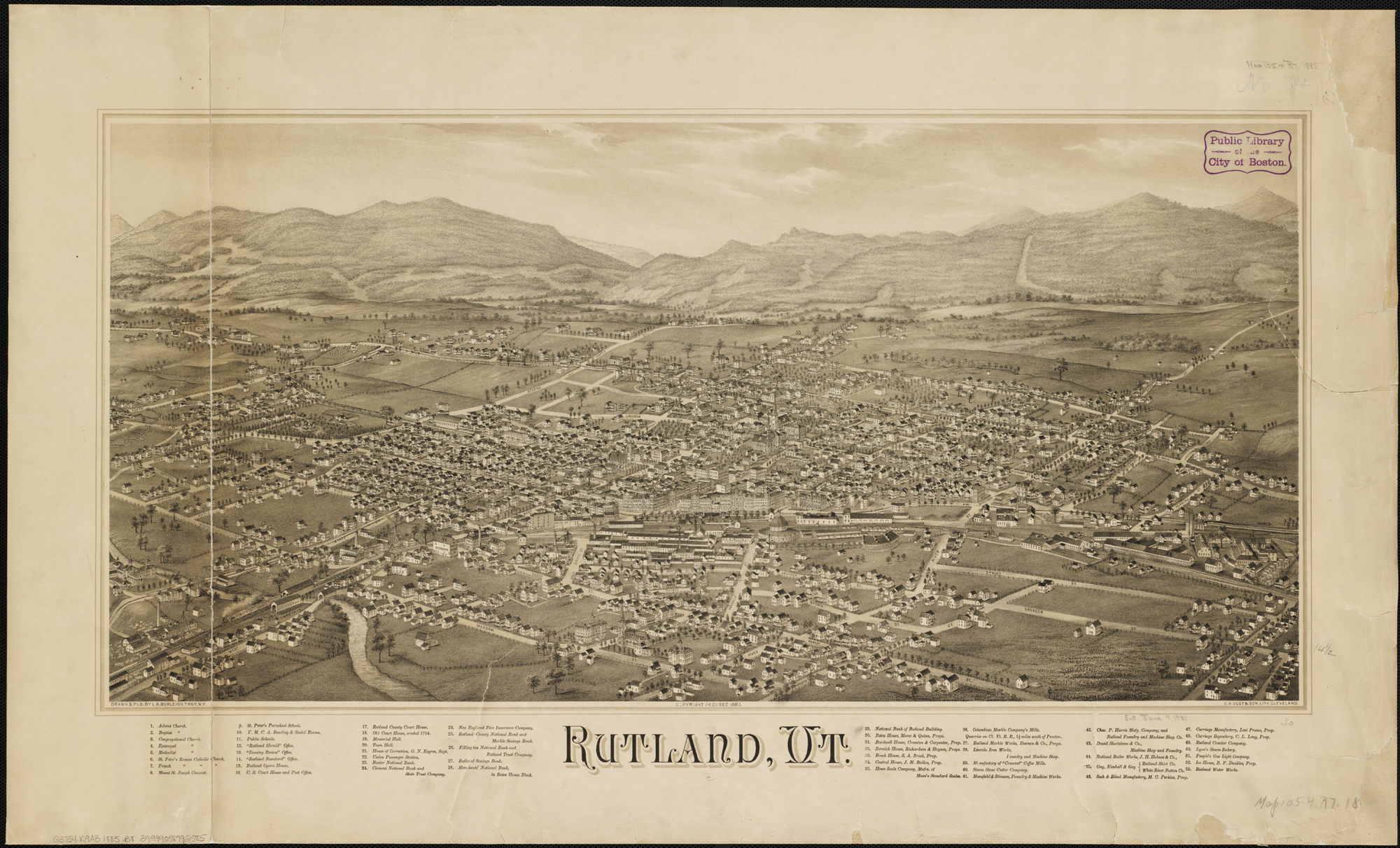
Lithograph of Rutland from 1885 by L. R. Burleigh with list of landmarks

This fueled enough growth and investment that in 1886 the center of town incorporated as Rutland village. Most of the town was split off as West Rutland and Proctor, which contained the bulk of the marble quarries. Rutland City was incorporated as Vermont's third city on November 18, 1892. The new city's first mayor was John A. Mead.

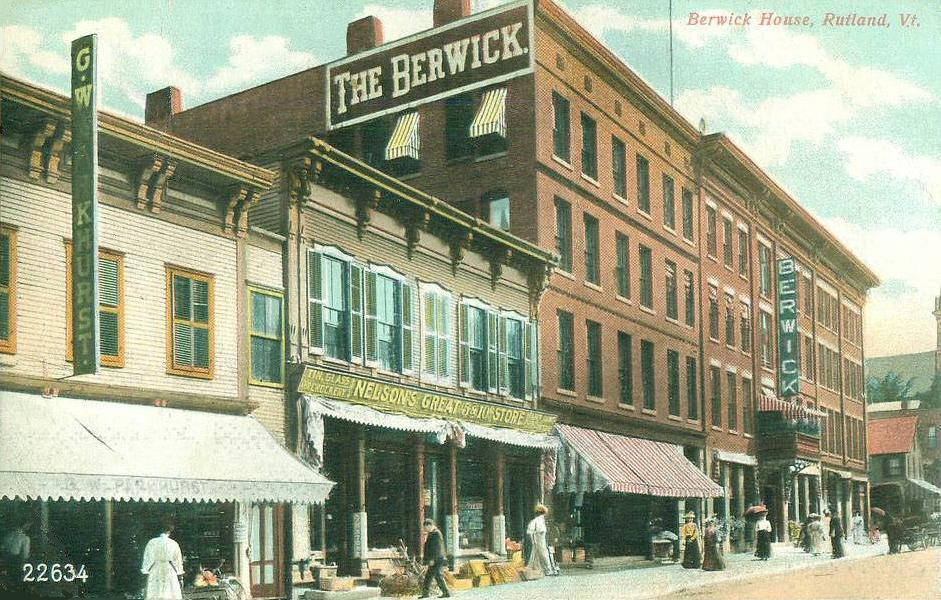
The Berwick House in 1907

The closing of the marble quarries in the area in the 1980s and 1990s led to a loss of jobs in the area.

== Geography ==
According to the United States Census Bureau, the city has a total area of 7.67 square miles (19.9 km^{2}), of which 7.6 square miles (20 km^{2}) is land and 0.04 square miles (0.10 km^{2}), or 0.52%, is water. Rutland is drained by Otter Creek, Moon Brook, Tenney Brook, East Creek and Mussey Brook.

=== Climate ===
The city of Rutland has a humid continental climate (Köppen Dfb) with long, cold, and snowy winters and warm, moist summers. The all-time record high is 102 °F or 38.9 °C, set in 2008. The all-time record low temperature is −43 °F or −41.7 °C, set in 1994. On average, the wettest month is July, and February is the driest.

Climate data for Rutland, Vermont (1991–2020 normals, extremes 1916–present)
Month	Jan	Feb	Mar	Apr	May	Jun	Jul	Aug	Sep	Oct	Nov	Dec	Year
Record high °F (°C)	70 (21)	71 (22)	86 (30)	92 (33)	93 (34)	98 (37)	98 (37)	98 (37)	94 (34)	87 (31)	79 (26)	69 (21)	98 (37)
Mean maximum °F (°C)	53.2 (11.8)	53.6 (12.0)	65.0 (18.3)	78.3 (25.7)	86.2 (30.1)	89.3 (31.8)	90.1 (32.3)	88.2 (31.2)	85.0 (29.4)	75.9 (24.4)	67.8 (19.9)	55.7 (13.2)	91.8 (33.2)
Mean daily maximum °F (°C)	29.4 (−1.4)	32.1 (0.1)	41.3 (5.2)	55.2 (12.9)	67.9 (19.9)	75.9 (24.4)	80.3 (26.8)	78.1 (25.6)	70.6 (21.4)	58.3 (14.6)	46.2 (7.9)	35.1 (1.7)	55.9 (13.3)
Daily mean °F (°C)	18.7 (−7.4)	20.5 (−6.4)	29.7 (−1.3)	42.9 (6.1)	55.1 (12.8)	63.7 (17.6)	68.4 (20.2)	66.3 (19.1)	58.3 (14.6)	46.8 (8.2)	36.1 (2.3)	25.7 (−3.5)	44.4 (6.9)
Mean daily minimum °F (°C)	8.0 (−13.3)	8.8 (−12.9)	18.1 (−7.7)	30.6 (−0.8)	42.2 (5.7)	51.5 (10.8)	56.4 (13.6)	54.4 (12.4)	46.0 (7.8)	35.3 (1.8)	26.0 (−3.3)	16.3 (−8.7)	32.8 (0.4)
Mean minimum °F (°C)	−14.3 (−25.7)	−11.0 (−23.9)	−2.1 (−18.9)	18.5 (−7.5)	28.7 (−1.8)	38.2 (3.4)	45.7 (7.6)	43.3 (6.3)	32.3 (0.2)	22.7 (−5.2)	10.8 (−11.8)	−4.4 (−20.2)	−17.7 (−27.6)
Record low °F (°C)	−36 (−38)	−30 (−34)	−20 (−29)	1 (−17)	20 (−7)	28 (−2)	35 (2)	32 (0)	23 (−5)	14 (−10)	−10 (−23)	−30 (−34)	−36 (−38)
Average precipitation inches (mm)	2.69 (68)	2.16 (55)	2.73 (69)	3.11 (79)	3.63 (92)	4.26 (108)	4.56 (116)	3.98 (101)	3.41 (87)	3.98 (101)	2.76 (70)	3.02 (77)	40.29 (1,023)
Average snowfall inches (cm)	18.3 (46)	16.0 (41)	13.8 (35)	3.2 (8.1)	0.0 (0.0)	0.0 (0.0)	0.0 (0.0)	0.0 (0.0)	0.0 (0.0)	0.3 (0.76)	4.7 (12)	18.3 (46)	74.6 (189)
Average extreme snow depth inches (cm)	10.5 (27)	11.7 (30)	11.0 (28)	2.8 (7.1)	0.0 (0.0)	0.0 (0.0)	0.0 (0.0)	0.0 (0.0)	0.0 (0.0)	0.2 (0.51)	2.2 (5.6)	7.4 (19)	15.6 (40)
Average precipitation days (≥ 0.01 in)	13.2	10.3	11.5	11.6	12.9	12.7	12.2	11.0	9.9	12.6	11.5	14.0	143.4
Average snowy days (≥ 0.1 in)	9.5	8.0	5.7	1.8	0.0	0.0	0.0	0.0	0.0	0.2	3.0	8.1	36.3
Source: NOAA

== Transportation ==
=== Roads and highways ===
Rutland is the third largest city in Vermont and is not located on, or near, either of the state's two major Interstate highways. It is, however, signed on I-91 at exit 6 northbound in Rockingham and appears on auxiliary signs at exit 10 southbound near White River Junction. The city is also signed on I-89 at exit 13 southbound in South Burlington, exit 3 southbound in Royalton, and exit 1 northbound in Quechee.

In addition, the city appears on auxiliary guide signs on the Adirondack Northway (I-87) before Exits 17 and 20.

U.S. Route 4 and U.S. Route 7 intersect and overlap each other in Rutland along Main Street between the former Diamond Run Mall and Woodstock Avenue and are the two main routes into the city. U.S. 7 connects Rutland with Manchester and Bennington to the south, and with Middlebury and Burlington to the north. To the east, U.S. 4 travels through Killington, Woodstock and White River Junction on its way toward New Hampshire. To the west, U.S. 4 has been rebuilt as a 4-lane freeway to the New York state line, a distance of just over 18 miles (29 km). It is currently the only limited-access freeway to serve Rutland. The former route of U.S. 4, which runs parallel to the freeway portion, is now signed as U.S. Route 4 Business and Vermont Route 4A.

=== Rail ===
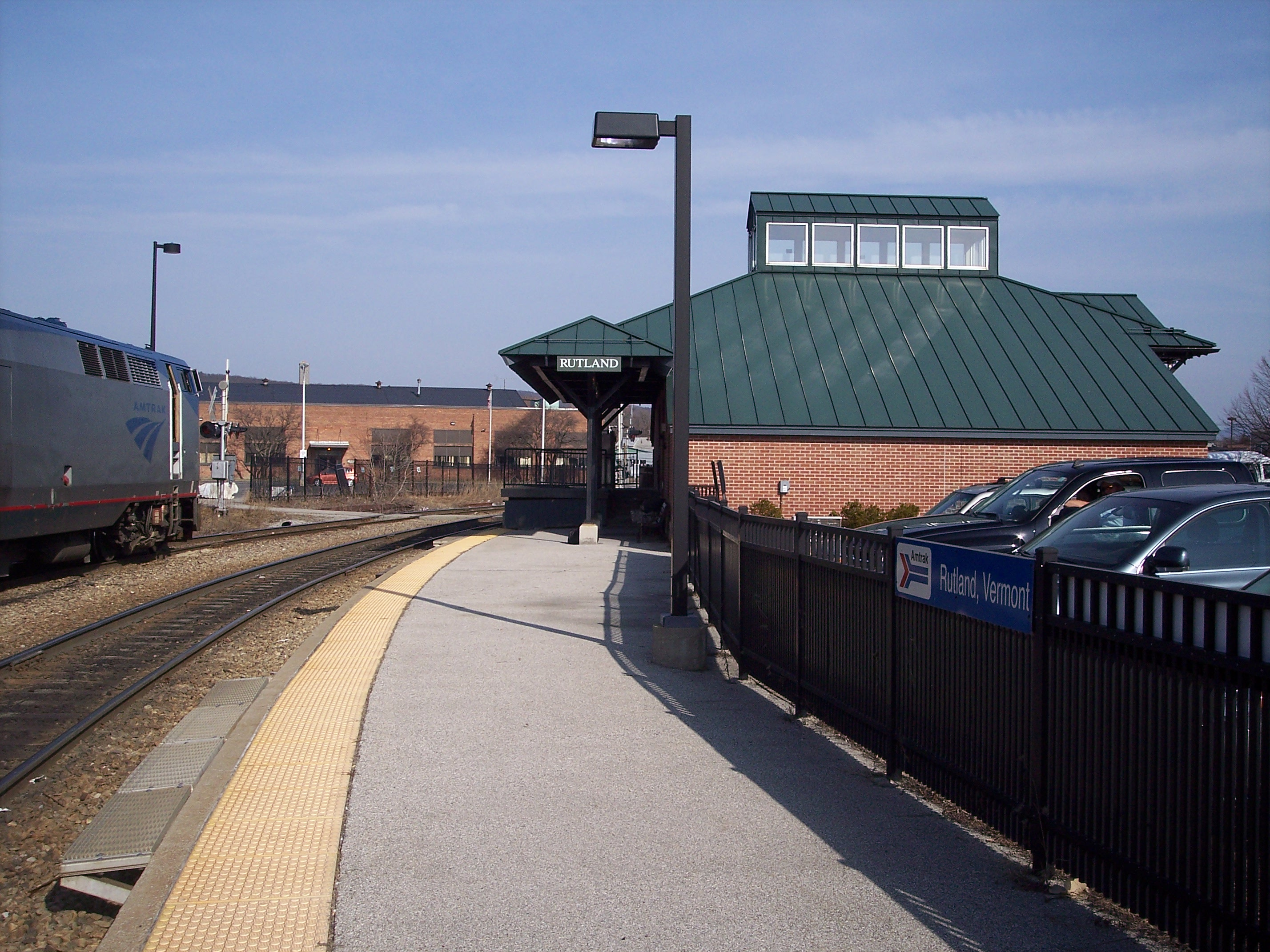
Rutland Amtrak station

Rutland's railroad station is a major stop on Amtrak's daily Ethan Allen Express train, with direct service south to New York City in 5.5 hours and north to Burlington in 2 hours. Other stops on the route include Albany, Castleton, Middlebury, and Vergennes.

=== Bus ===
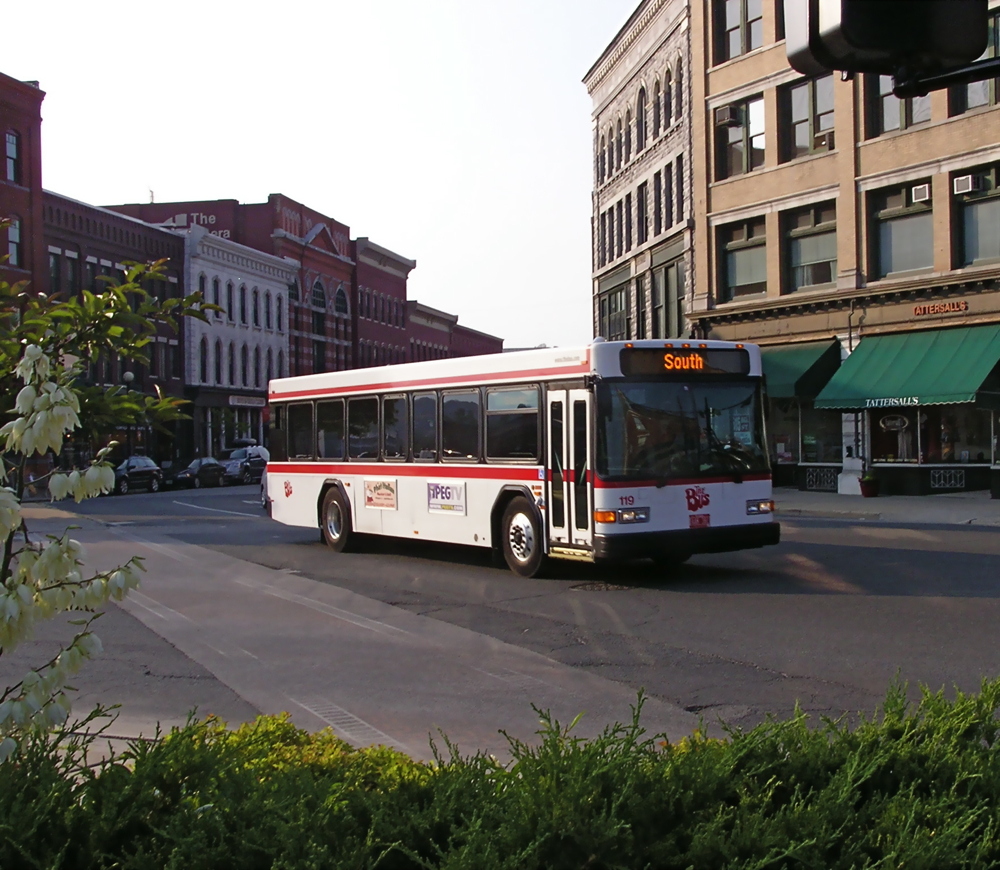
The Bus, downtown Rutland

Rutland is home to "The Bus", run by Marble Valley Regional Transit District, a local bus system costing $1.00 per person per ride ($0.50 for discount qualified riders), and $3 for out-of-town commuter and connector buses, with other expenses covered largely by taxpayers. Five local routes currently serve the city, along with other commuter routes serving the nearby towns of Fair Haven, Manchester, Middlebury (in a partnership with Addison County Transit Resources), and Proctor. 2 winter tourist geared buses also go to and from Okemo Mountain in Ludlow and Killington Ski Resort; the bus serving Killington is called the Diamond Express. Both of these buses run year round. "The Bus" was free prior to 2007, when the 50 cents fare was added to control the added gas expenses. MVRTD is housed in the downtown Marble Valley Regional Transit Center.

Premier Coach's Vermont Translines serves Rutland daily with two intercity bus connections between Burlington, Lebanon, New Hampshire and Albany, New York, in its partnership with Greyhound. The two bus lines also meet at the Marble Valley Regional Transit Center as of June 9, 2014.

=== Air ===
The Rutland–Southern Vermont Regional Airport is a state-owned public airport located 6 miles (9.7 km) south of the city center in North Clarendon. The airport's only commercial offering is thrice-daily Cape Air flights to and from Logan International Airport in Boston, Massachusetts, which connect nationally through JetBlue Airways.

== Demographics ==
Historical population
Census	Pop.	Note	%±
1880	7,502		—
1890	8,239		9.8%
1900	11,499		39.6%
1910	13,546		17.8%
1920	14,954		10.4%
1930	17,315		15.8%
1940	17,082		−1.3%
1950	17,659		3.4%
1960	18,325		3.8%
1970	19,293		5.3%
1980	18,436		−4.4%
1990	18,230		−1.1%
2000	17,292		−5.1%
2010	16,495		−4.6%
2020	15,807		−4.2%
U.S. Decennial Census

As of the census of 2010, there were 16,495 people, 7,167 households, and 4,209 families residing in the city. The population density was 2,254.5 people per square mile (870.5 people/km^{2}). There were 7,167 housing units at an average density of 94.49 units per square mile (36.48 units/km^{2}). The racial makeup of the city was 95.9% White, 0.8% African American, 0.3% Native American, 0.8% Asian, 0.1% Pacific Islander, 0.3% from other races, and 1.8% from two or more races. Hispanic or Latino of any race were 1.5% of the population.

There were 7,452 households, out of which 21.1% had children under the age of 18 living with them, 39.8% were married couples living together, 12.5% had a female householder with no husband present, and 43.5% were non-families. 36.1% of all households were made up of individuals, and 13.9% had someone living alone who was 65 years of age or older. The average household size was 2.22 and the average family size was 2.80.

In the city, the population was spread out, with 22.7% under the age of 18, 7.8% from 18 to 24, 28.9% from 25 to 44, 22.4% from 45 to 64, and 18.2% who were 65 years of age or older. The median age was 39.3 years. For every 100 females, there were 89.8 males. For every 100 females age 18 and over, there were 86.5 males.

== Government ==
At the local level, Rutland is governed by a Mayor and Board of Aldermen. For representation in the Vermont House of Representatives, Rutland is split into four districts. In the Vermont Senate, Rutland is represented by three state senators who serve most of Rutland County.

== Economy ==
=== Sales ===
One measure of economic activity is retail sales. Rutland stood third in the state in 2007 with $321.6 million. The city's former shopping centers were the Rutland Mall and Diamond Run Mall.

=== Personal income ===
The median income for a household in the city was $30,478, and the median income for a family was $41,561. Males had a median income of $29,457 versus $23,688 for females. The per capita income for the city was $17,075. 15.4% of the population and 10.3% of families were below the poverty line. Out of the total people living in poverty, 30.1% are under the age of 18 and 10.5% are 65 or older.

=== Industry ===
Major area employers are Rutland Regional Medical Center, General Electric Aircraft Engines (GE), OMYA, Green Mountain Power and Carris Reels. GE employed 975 workers in 2010. Casella Waste Systems is the second largest private employer (behind GE Aircraft), employing 583 employees at its headquarters on Green Hill Lane.

=== Hospital ===
Rutland Regional Medical Center is Vermont's second-largest health care facility, with 188 inpatient beds and 120 physicians.

== Culture and entertainment ==
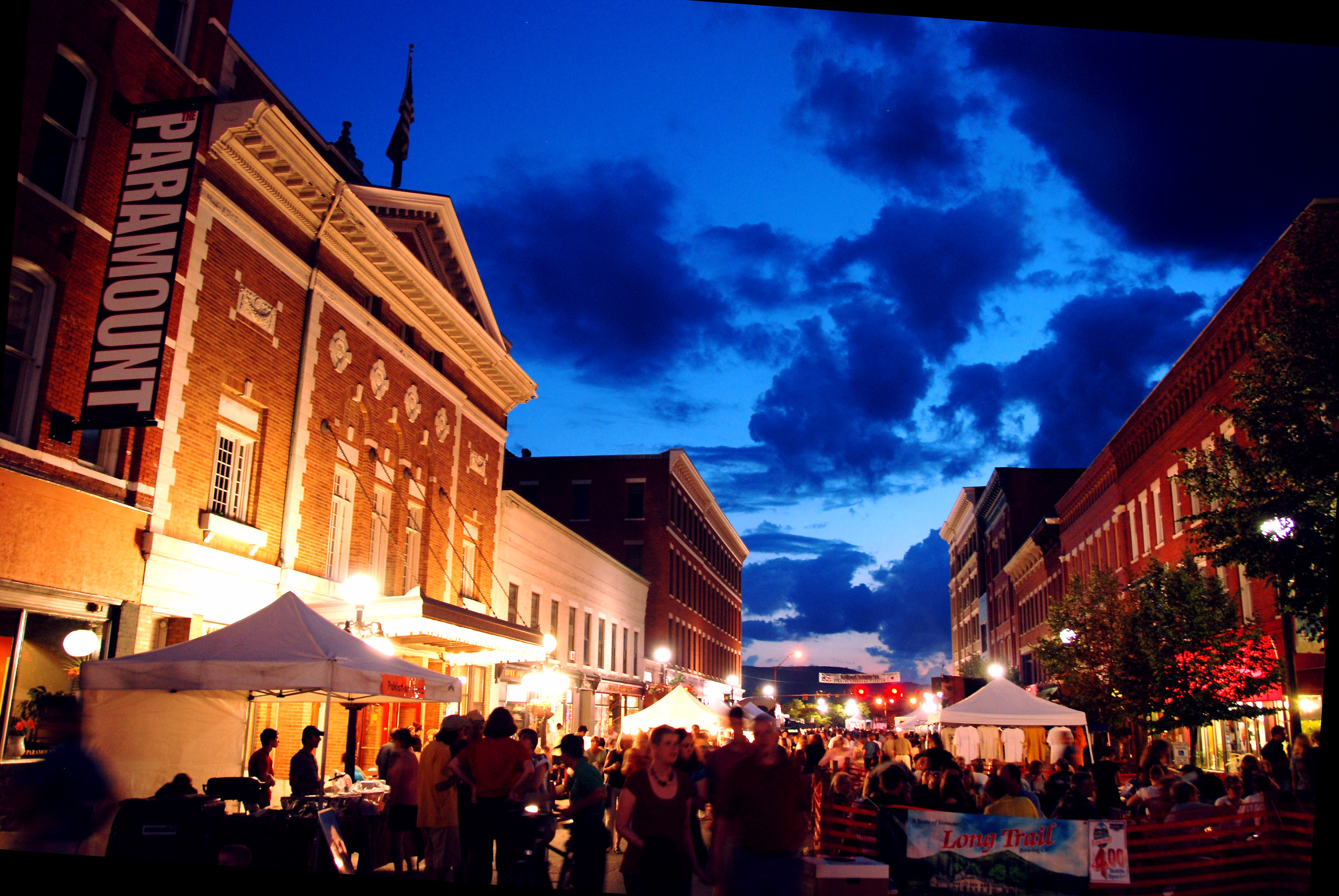
Ethnic Festival in 2008

The downtown section contains the Rutland Free Library, the Paramount Theater and Merchant's Row, a restored street dating back to the mid-19th century. 108 buildings in downtown Rutland are listed in the National Register of Historic Places. Rutland also has the 275-acre (111 ha) Pine Hill Park offering mountain biking, hiking, and other outdoor recreation. At the park's entrance is the Flip Side Skatepark, municipally operated in an open-sided closed roof arena at the Giorgetti Athletic Complex.

=== Events in Rutland ===
- Art in the Park
- Friday Night Live
- A Summer Farmers' Market in downtown Rutland's Depot Park
- A Winter Farmers' Market in the Vermont Farmers Food Center
- Downtown Street Party & Sidewalk Sales
- Downtown Sip and Shops
- The Summer Concert Series in Main Street Park
- The Vermont State Fair
- Rutland Winter Fest
- Green Mountain Open Bowling Tournament
- Rutland County Pride Festival

The Rutland Halloween Parade has taken place annually since 1960. In the early 1970s, the Rutland Halloween Parade was used as the setting of a number of superhero comic books, including Batman #237, Justice League of America #103, Freedom Fighters #6, Amazing Adventures #16, Avengers #83, and The Mighty Thor #207. The parade celebrated its 50th anniversary in 2009.

=== In popular culture ===
Multiple episodes of the truTV reality show Speeders feature the Rutland City Police Department. The city has been the setting for many feature films and cable TV movies by film studio Edgewood Studios and filmmaker David Giancola. In Amazon's 2019 series Hanna, when the titular character is given a new identity under the name Mia Wolff, she is said to live in Rutland, Vermont.

The city's famous annual Halloween Parade was featured in a number of comic books published by DC Comics and Marvel Comics, particularly in the late 1970s and early 1980s.

=== Sister city ===
Ishidoriya, Iwate, Japan

Since 1986, Rutland hosts an annual exchange called the Rutland Ishidoriya Student Exchange (R.I.S.E), selecting students from grades 8–11 to send to Ishidoriya, Japan. All of the money used to support the exchange is from fundraising. In exchange, five students from Ishidoriya come to Rutland the January after the Rutland ambassadors return each year.

=== Historic sites ===
(Date indicates inclusion on the National Register of Historic Places)

- Arthur Perkins House – 242 South Main Street (added October 27, 1988)
- Chaffee-Moloney Houses – 194 & 196-98 Columbian Avenue (added December 19, 2001)
- Clementwood – Clement Road (added October 27, 1980)
- H. H. Baxter Memorial Library – 96 Grove Street (added September 24, 1978)
- Longfellow School – 6 Church Street (added 1976)
- Proctor-Clement House – 85 Field Avenue (added July 17, 1982)
- Rutland Courthouse Historic District – U.S. 7 (added October 8, 1976)
- Rutland Downtown Historic District – roughly bounded by Strong Avenue, State, Wales, Washington, Pine and Cottage streets (added September 22, 1980)
- Rutland Free Library – the 1859 former post office and courthouse designed by Ammi B. Young
- St. Peter's Church and Mount St. Joseph Convent Complex – Convent Avenue, Meadow and River streets (added November 3, 1980)

=== Notable people ===
Aaron Lewis - American singer and songwriter

John Deere (inventor) - American inventor and founder of American company John Deere

=== Education ===
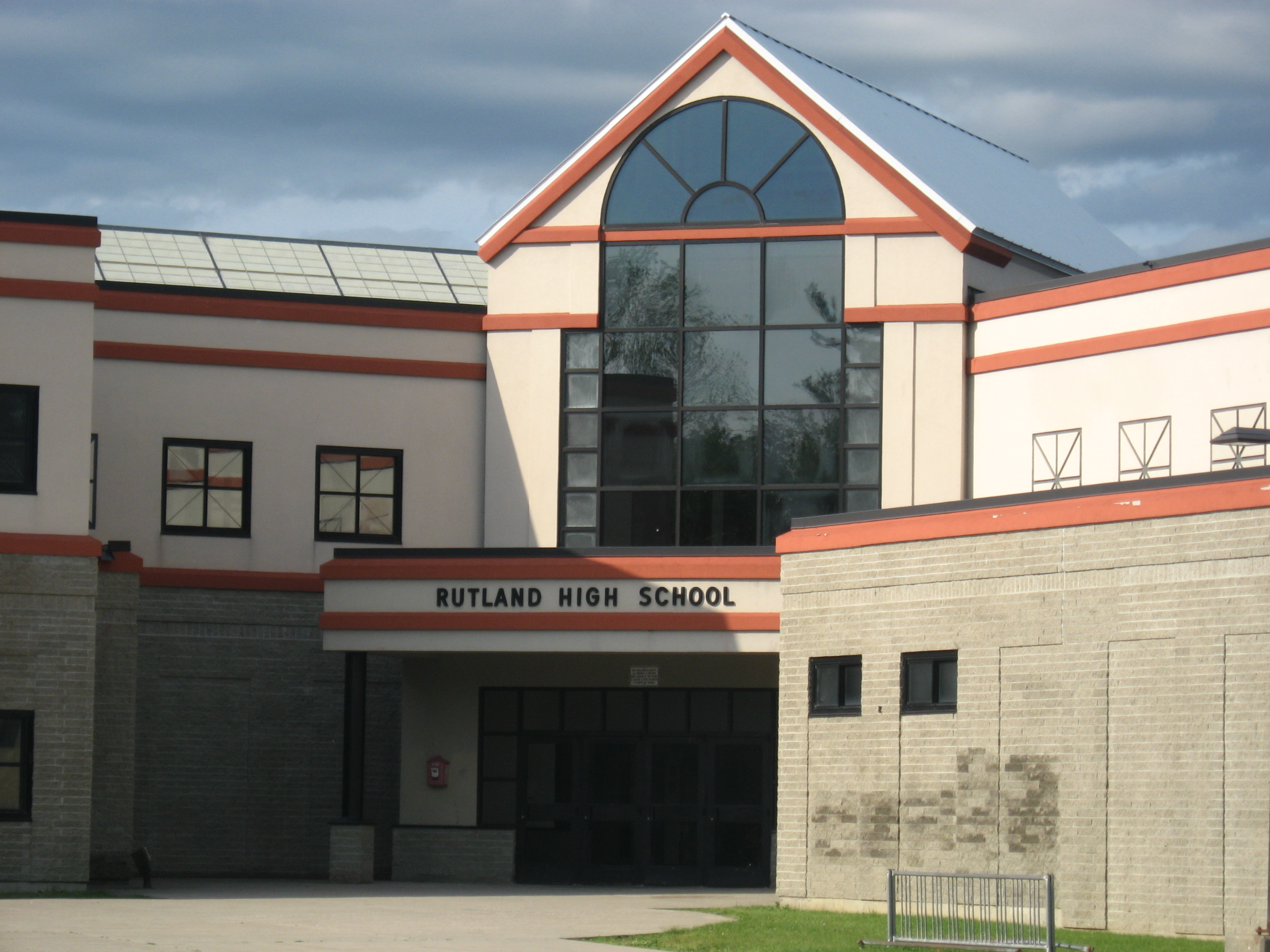
Rutland High School

=== Public ===
Public schools are managed by Rutland City Public Schools. These are:

- Rutland High School
- Rutland Middle School
- Allen Street Campus
- Howe Center Campus
- Rutland Intermediate School
- Northwest Primary School
- Northeast Primary School
- Stafford Technical Center

A publicly funded pre-kindergarten program for eligible families is offered through Rutland County Head Start on Meadow Street.

=== Private ===
Private schools include the Catholic Christ the King School (primary) and Mount Saint Joseph Academy (9–12), and the Rutland Area Christian School (K–12). Private pre-kindergarten programs are offered at Grace Preschool, Hearts and Minds Childcare and Preschool, Good Shepherd's Little Lambs Early Learning Center, The Peanut Gallery Preschool & Early Learning Center, and more.

=== College ===
The city is also home to two colleges, the College of St. Joseph in Vermont (now closed), and Community College of Vermont (CCV). Many Rutland residents will commute to nearby Castleton University, whose hockey teams practice in nearby Rutland Town.

== Media ==
=== Newspapers ===
The city's print news comes from the Pulitzer Prize-winning Rutland Herald, which publishes five days a week. "Sam's Good News" is a local weekly shopper/local-interest newspaper which is circulated throughout Central Vermont and upstate New York. "The Mountain Times" is also circulated in Rutland.

=== Radio ===
There are seven radio stations licensed to Rutland:

- 88.7 FM WRVT (public radio)
- 90.9 WFTF
- 94.5 WDVT (classic rock)
- 95.7 WMTZ-LP (3ABN Radio)
- 97.1 WZRT (Top 40)
- 98.1 WJJR (Adult Contemporary hits)
- 1380 AM WSYB

=== Television ===
Rutland is part of the Burlington / Plattsburgh television market. Comcast offers most major in-market channels, including local Vermont PBS outlet WVER, channel 28, as well as Albany, New York stations WRGB (CBS), WTEN (ABC), and WMHT (PBS). PEGTV broadcasts local government programming on Comcast channels 15, 20, and 21.

== See also ==
- Rutland City School District
- Rutland Railway
- Rutland station
- List of mayors of Rutland, Vermont
