= Mount Abraham Union High School =

Mount Abraham Union Middle/High School

Location
- 220 Airport Drive; Bristol, Vermont 05443-1201; United States; 44°08′08″N 73°05′38″W

Information
- Former name: Bristol High School
- Type: Public middle school and high school
- Established: 1969; 57 years ago
- School district: Mount Abraham Unified School District
- Principal: Shannon Warden
- Teaching staff: 57.98 (FTE) (2021–22)
- Grades: 7–12
- Enrollment: 589 (2023–24)
- Student to teacher ratio: 11.09 (2021–22)
- Colors: Maroon and White
- Newspaper: Birdseye View
- Yearbook: Aerie
- Website: mta.mausd.org

Mount Abraham Union High School is a public high school in Bristol, Vermont (U.S.).

== History ==
The Bristol High School was located in downtown Bristol, Vermont on what is now School Street. There had been schools at that location since 1837. In 1969, the current building was built at the site of the old Bristol Airport. The former Bristol High School building was demolished and a new building, built for offices, was erected. The upper levels now serve as office space and the lower levels now serve as Bristol Fitness, the local gym.

== Leadership ==
In 2019, Mt. Abe welcomed Shannon Warden as the new interim principal. The decision was made to hire Shannon as the next principal. Shannon worked in classroom science education prior to becoming an administrator. In 2022, the school welcomed Ayrin Thibault as the new assistant principal and Joel Jones as a dean of students (position established). Jones left the school before the 2023–2024 school year, leaving the position vacant until Jason Rasco was hired as a new assistant principal in October 2023. Rasco served in this position until his resignation in spring of 2025, and Chelsea Rivenbark was subsequently hired to take his place.

== Student Life ==
Mt. Abraham is a predominately white school, with very few students and teachers being of differing ethnicities. A large number of students are raised within the agricultural community. The school maintains an open and accepting philosophy which is largely echoed by students.

The theater department is regarded as one of the best in the state and consistently receives high praise. They put on two productions every year, with performances in November and March. The fall musical is unique in that no student, no matter what experience level, will be denied the opportunity to participate in the musical, either onstage or off. The spring musical is considered to be more of a "varsity level" production, with a smaller cast size and preference given towards more experienced high school students. The theater department also started putting on middle school musicals through ELP (Extended Learning Program), open to 6th, 7th, and 8th graders in the district.

Students have a variety of activism opportunities, including EAG (the Environmental Action Group), GSA (Gay/Straight Alliance), and Morgan's Message, a group centered on mental health issues relating to sports. Students can also serve on the Community Council, be elected as student leadership of their grade (president, vice president, treasurer, secretary) and join Eagle Leadership Society (juniors and seniors only). Other clubs/extracurricular offerings include Injury Prevention Club, Rowing Club, Modern Band and A Capella groups, and the Scholars' Bowl team, which won the small school state championships in 2024, 2025, and 2026, traveling to nationals in Chicago in 2025 and 2026. The school hosts three school dances, homecoming, the Harvest Festival Dance (formerly the Halloween Dance), and the Winter Ball. Prom is hosted by the junior class officers in May at an offsite location.

The school also has a lively sports community, including football, soccer, cross country, lacrosse, volleyball, basketball, track and field, wrestling, softball, bass fishing, golf, and field hockey. The Mt. Abe Girls Lacrosse team were defeated in 2023 for the state championship. The Mt. Abe Boys Lacrosse team won the 2024 State Championships, and the Mt. Abe Varsity Baseball Team were narrowly defeated at the 2024 State Championships, but redeemed themselves and won in June of 2026. In June 2025, the Mt. Abe Varsity Softball team won the Division II state championship. The Varsity Boys Soccer team were defeated at the 2025 state championships. Several individual athletes won at the 2026 Track and Field State Championships.

== Course Offerings, Requirements & Future ==
Students have the opportunity to pursue AP level coursework in English, history, science, and art starting their 11th-grade year. AP coursework includes AP European History, AP United States History, AP Literature and Composition, AP Language and Composition, AP Physics, and AP Biology. Many other course offerings across all academic areas are available for students starting in 9th grade. Students are also able to attend the Patricia A. Hannaford Career Center in Middlebury, where they can take part in a variety of programs ranging from automotive technology to culinary arts. Students are also able to take classes online through VHS (Virtual high school), dual enrollment programs with local colleges, and even have the opportunity to do early college during their senior year, where they can complete a year of college while still earning a high school diploma.

The middle school is centered on a "team approach" where each student is assigned a "team" made up of teachers and students (both 7th and 8th grade). That team is responsible for core interdisciplinary instruction in science, English, and social studies. Math, physical education, and health education is not offered on the team, rather students from different teams are mixed amongst teachers in those areas.

Students who wish to graduate are required to take a half semester financial literacy course named Money Matters, developed by one of the school's math teachers. In 2023 the Money Matters class won the Stock Market Game. Students are also required to take a civics and government course named U.S. Government & Politics which is aimed to prepare students to be better citizens and use America's democratic processes. A full program of studies can be found on the school's counseling website.

In 2022, 59% of students attended 2 & 4 year colleges post-high school. 1% of students attended military colleges, down from 5% in 2021 and 13% in 2020. The remaining 40% planned to seek employment, a gap year, or were "undecided", according to the district's 2024 Annual Report (see page 24).

Also in 2022, only 0.07% of students have dropped out of high school. This is down from the record in 2021 with 1.7% of students dropping out (see page 24, district's annual report).

== Teacher Advisory & F.I.T. Block ==
Students in middle school are assigned to a mixed-grade teacher advisory where they will remain for the two years they are in middle school. Students in high school are assigned to a grade-level teacher advisory where they will remain for their 4 high school years. Teacher advisory serves as a time where students can center themselves and prepare for the day, and seek extra help or support from a teacher they develop a more personal connection with over the two or four years.

F.I.T. Block (Flexible Instructional Time) is a 30 minute time block at the end of each high school day. This serves as a time where students can sign up to go to different teachers' classrooms to seek support, complete assignments or tests, or simply hang out with friends. On Mondays, all students go to their assigned teacher advisory where they work on their Personalized Learning Plans, a requirement for graduation in Vermont.

== Notable alumni ==
- Anais Mitchell (1999), playwright and creator of the Tony Award winning musical Hadestown
- Ryan Cochran-Siegle (2010), Alpine skier
