= Rutland High School =

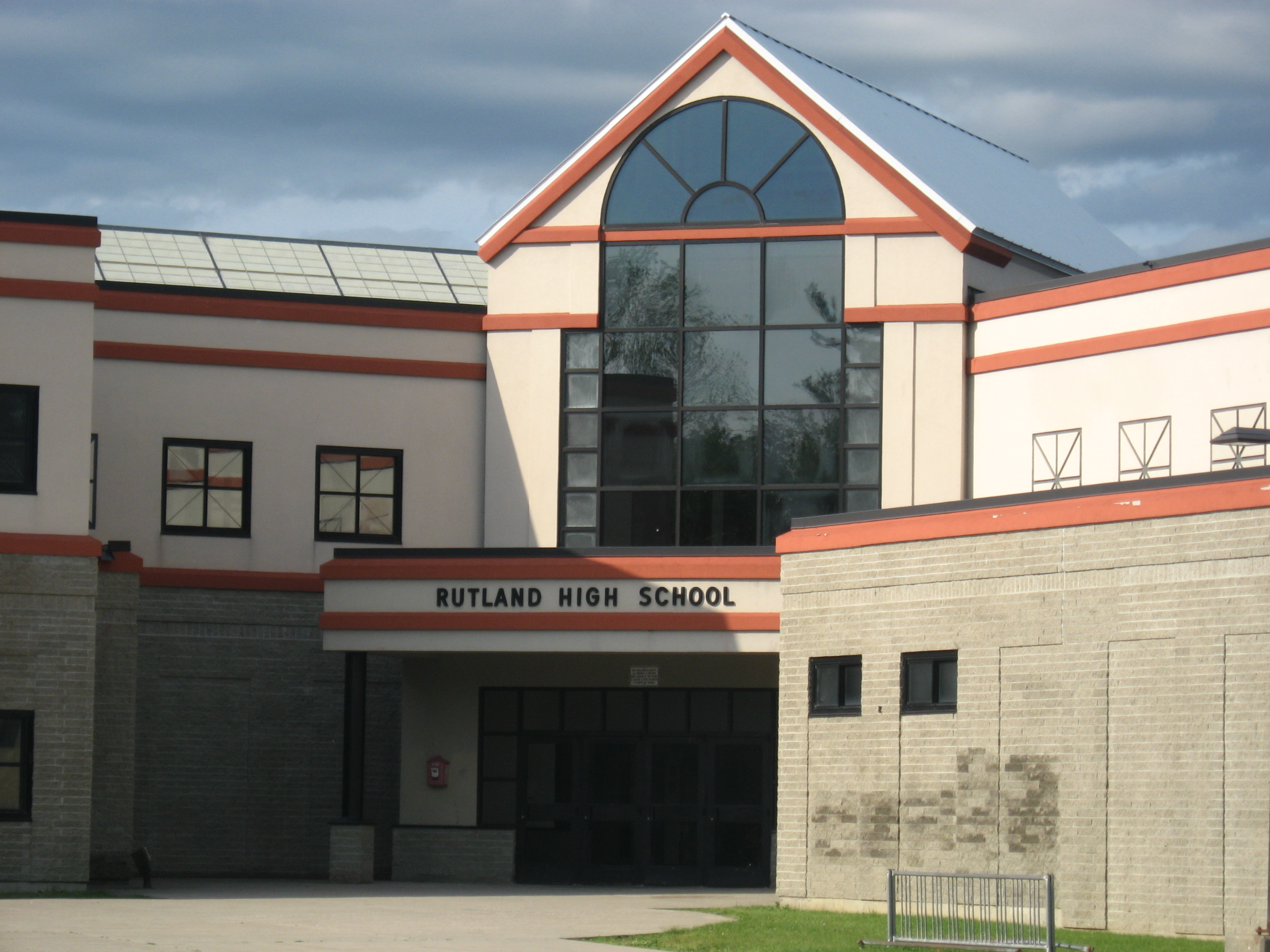

Location
- 22 Stratton Road; Rutland, Vermont 05701; United States; 43°37′03″N 72°57′17″W

Information
- Motto: Every Student, Every Day!
- Established: 1855; 171 years ago
- School district: Rutland City School District
- Superintendent: Pam Reed
- NCES School ID: 500705000271
- Principal: Greg Schillinger
- Staff: 68.03 (FTE)
- Grades: 9-12
- Enrollment: 814 (2018-19)
- Student to teacher ratio: 11.97
- Color
- Athletics: Football, Basketball, Ice Hockey, Soccer, Wrestling, Field Hockey, Cross Country, Track and Field, Lacrosse, Baseball, Softball, Cheerleading, Alpine Skiing, Nordic Skiing, Snowboarding, Golf, and Tennis
- Team name: Rutland
- Website: rhs.rutlandcitypublicschools.org

Rutland High School is a senior high school located in Rutland, Vermont, and attended by students in grades 9-12. It has been located on Stratton Road since 1994. Prior to 1994 Rutland High School was located on Library Avenue (current Rutland Intermediate School). Prior to the Library Avenue location, Rutland High School was on Center Street (current Rutland City Fire Department location). The high school is a part of the Rutland City Public School District.

The school is accredited by the New England Association of Schools and Colleges (NEASC). Its initial accreditation was in 1944, and its next review will be in 2029. As of its last accreditation the school had 820 students.

The school is a comprehensive high school, and was founded in 1855. The school is located in an urban setting. It utilizes a 7.25 school day for 178 days a year.

== Athletics ==
Rutland High School Championships:

- Football (Prior to 1970 the Champion was picked by sports writers): 1938, 1939, 1942, 1945, 1948, 1951, 1954, 1960, 1984, 1991, 1996, 1997, 2000, 2001, 2003, 2004, 2006, 2015
- Football Runner-up: 1972, 1989, 1990, 1998, 2008, 2009, 2018, 2024
- Boys Soccer: 2001
- Boys Soccer Runner-up: 2002
- Girls Soccer Runner-up: 2006
- Field Hockey: 1993, 1994, 1995
- Field Hockey Runner-up: 1986, 1996
- Boys Golf: 1984, 1988, 2003, 2006, 2013, 2014, 2017, 2023
- Boys Golf Runner-up: 1975, 1976, 1979, 1982,

2001, 2005, 2007, 2012, 2016, 2020, 2024

- Girls Golf: 2000, 2004, 2005, 2006, 2007, 2008, 2009, 2012, 2013, 2014, 2015, 2019
- Girls Golf Runner-up: 2002, 2010, 2016
- Girls Cross Country: 1980, 1981, 1983
- Girls XC Runner-up: 1982, 1994, 1995
- Boys XC Runner-up: 1980, 1974, 1971
- Boys Basketball: 1928, 1933, 1947, 1952, 1958, 1967, 2017, 2018
- Boys Basketball Runner-up: 1925, 1930, 1949, 1980, 1981, 1984, 1993, 2011, 2019, 2022
- Girls Basketball: 2005, 2020
- Girls Basketball Runner-up: 2010
- Boys Hockey: 1983, 1995
- Boys Hockey Runner-up: 1998, 2001, 2007
- Girls Hockey: 2017
- Boys Alpine Skiing: 1987, 1993, 1994, 1997, 2001, 2004, 2010, 2024
- Boys Alpine Runner-up: 1984, 1985, 1986, 1998, 1999, 2000, 2007, 2008, 2017
- Girls Alpine Skiing: 1988, 1990, 1993, 1994, 1995, 1996, 1997, 2001, 2004, 2007, 2008, 2009, 2010
- Girls Alpine Runner-up: 1980, 1998, 1999, 2002, 2003
- Boys Nordic Skiing: 2001, 2002
- Boys Nordic Runner-up: 1997
- Girls Nordic Skiing: 2009
- Boys Snowboarding: 2002, 2005, 2006, 2007, 2008, 2016
- Girls Snowboarding: 2002, 2005, 2008, 2012
- Boys Indoor Track: 1984, 1985, 2001, 2002
- Girls Indoor Track: 1984, 2001, 2002, 2003, 2004
- Girls Indoor Runner-up: 1985, 1999, 2000
- Cheerleading: 1991, 2002, 2006, 2007, 2009, 2010, 2013, 2015, 2016, 2017, 2018, 2019, 2020, 2021, 2022, 2023, 2024
- Cheerleading Runner-up: 1990, 1992, 1993, 1996, 2001, 2008, 2011, 2012, 2014
- Baseball: 1950, 1974, 1982
- Baseball Runner-up: 1941, 1948, 1952, 1981, 1985
- Softball: 1980, 1982, 2000
- Softball Runner-up: 1981, 2001, 2008
- Girls Lacrosse: 2009
- Boys Tennis: 1986
- Boys Tennis Runner-up: 1979, 1981, 2012, 2013
- Girls Tennis: 1975, 1977, 1981
- Girls Tennis Runner-up: 1978, 1980
- Girls Track and Field: 1981, 1982, 1983, 1984
- Girls Track Runner-up: 1979, 1995, 1996
- Boys Track and Field: 1923, 1924, 1925, 1926, 1937, 1938, 1939, 1947, 1948, 1949, 1974, 1975, 1976, 1983, 2002
- Boys Track Runner-up: 1921, 1922, 1952, 1952, 1964, 1971, 1977, 1984, 1985, 1991, 1992, 2000, 2003

== Notable alumni ==
- William Carris (1963), businessman and member of the Vermont Senate
- Percival W. Clement (1862), governor of Vermont
- William D. Cohen (1975), associate justice of the Vermont Supreme Court
- Jake Eaton (1999), professional football player
- Joy Hakim (1947), teacher and author
- Jim Jeffords (1952), U.S. senator
- Lawrence C. Jones (1912), Vermont Attorney General
- Jim McCaffrey (1981), professional basketball player
- Kevin J. Mullin (1975), member of the Vermont House of Representatives and Vermont Senate
- Joseph F. Radigan (1924), United States Attorney for Vermont
- Milford K. Smith (1924), associate justice of the Vermont Supreme Court
- Robert Stafford (1931), U.S. senator
- Richard C. Thomas (1955), Secretary of State of Vermont
- Leonard F. Wing (1914), attorney and Vermont Army National Guard major general
- John E. Woodward (1887), U.S. Army brigadier general
