= Bristol, Vermont =

- Town
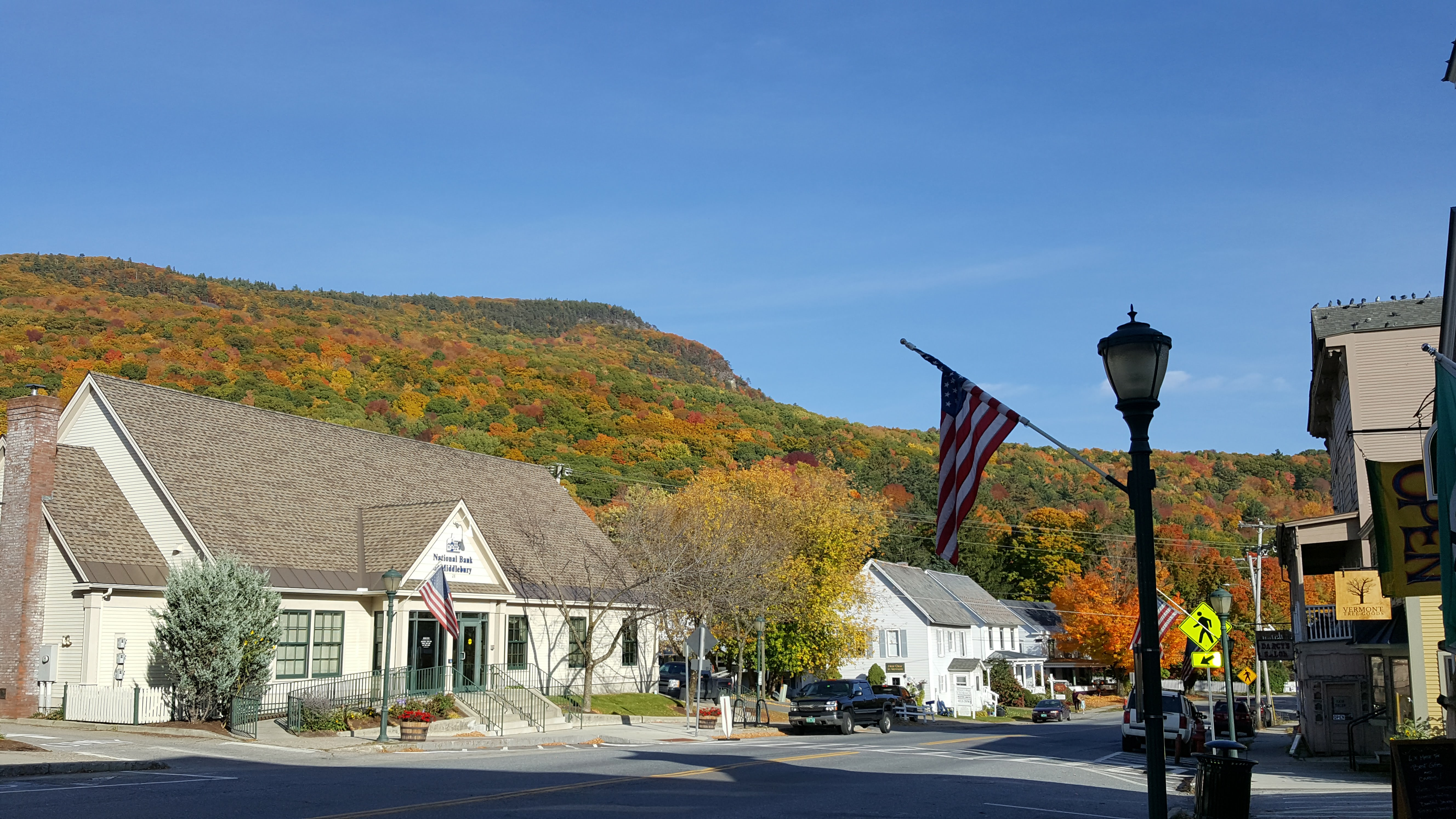
- Main Street in Bristol in the fall

- Location in Addison County and the state of Vermont
- Coordinates: 44°08′36″N 73°06′26″W
- Country: United States
- State: Vermont
- County: Addison
- Chartered: 1762
- Settled: 1783
- Organized: 1789
- Communities: Bristol; Rocky Dale

Area
  - Total: 42.2 sq mi (109.2 km^{2})
  - Land: 41.5 sq mi (107.5 km^{2})
  - Water: 0.66 sq mi (1.7 km^{2})
- Elevation: 932 ft (284 m)

Population (2020)
  - Total: 3,782
  - Density: 91/sq mi (35.2/km^{2})
- Time zone: UTC-5 (Eastern (EST))
  - Summer (DST): UTC-4 (EDT)
- ZIP code: 05443
- Area code: 802
- FIPS code: 50-09025
- GNIS feature ID: 1462053
- Website: bristolvt.org

Bristol is a town in Addison County, Vermont, United States. The town was chartered on June 26, 1762, by the colonial governor of New Hampshire, Benning Wentworth. The charter was granted to Samuel Averill and sixty-three associates in the name of Pocock—in honor of a distinguished English admiral of that name. The population was 3,782 at the 2020 census. Main Street is home to most of the businesses of the town. The town is also home to the Lord's Prayer Rock.

== Geography ==
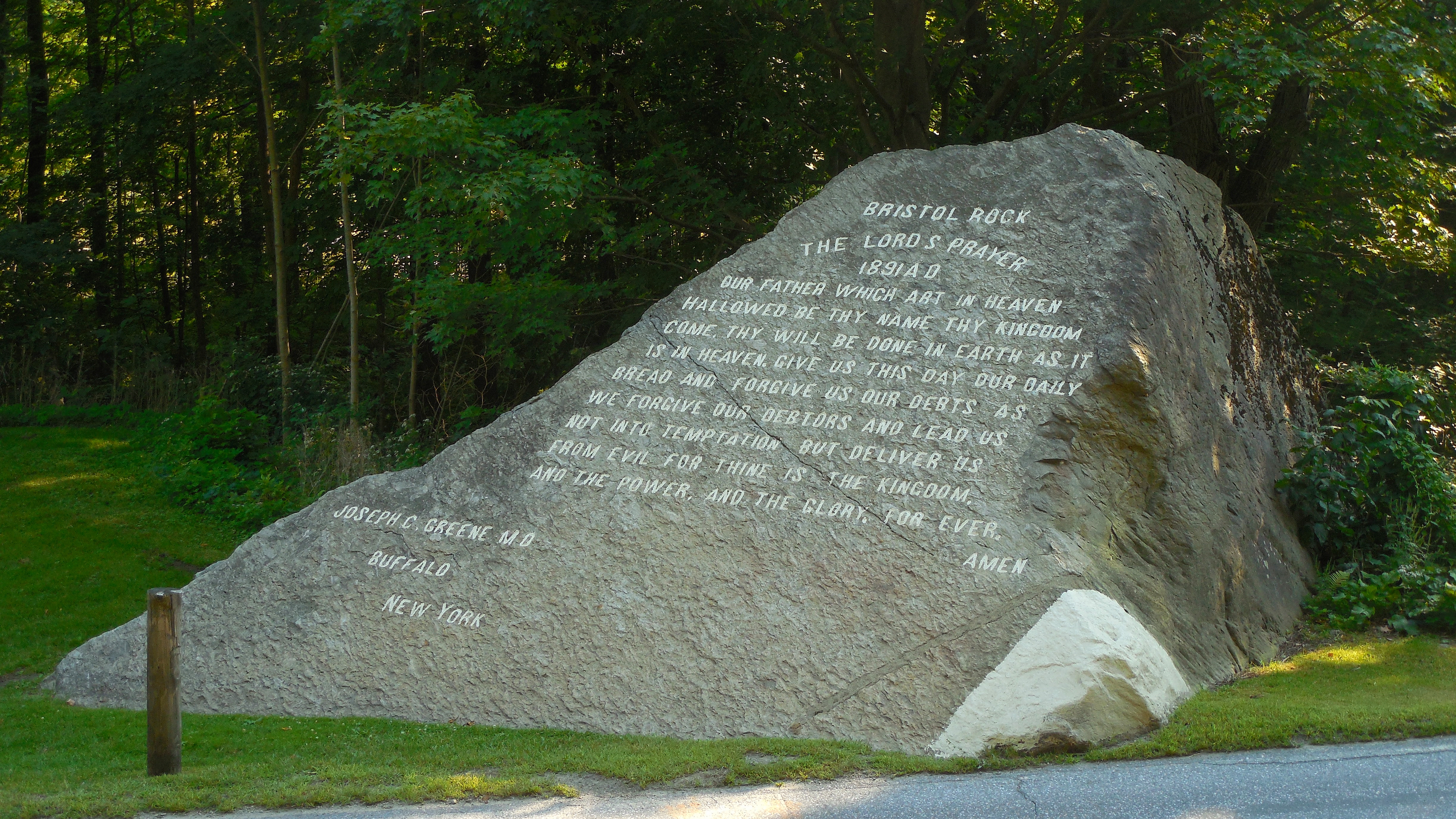
Bristol Rock (otherwise known as Lord's Prayer Rock) on Route 17 / Route 116 in Bristol, commissioned by local physician Joseph C. Greene.

Bristol is in northeastern Addison County, at the western foot of the Green Mountains. The New Haven River, a tributary of Otter Creek, flows out of the mountains through the town center. The town is crossed by Vermont Route 17 (east-west) and Vermont Route 116 (north-south).

According to the United States Census Bureau, the town has a total area of 42.2 square miles (109.2 km^{2}), of which 41.5 square miles (107.5 km^{2}) is land and 0.66 square miles (1.7 km^{2}), or 1.57%, is water.

The main settlement in the town is Bristol, a census-designated place, located on the north side of the New Haven River, northwest of the geographic center of town.

== Demographics ==
Historical population
Census	Pop.	Note	%±
1790	211		—
1800	665		215.2%
1810	1,179		77.3%
1820	1,051		−10.9%
1830	1,274		21.2%
1840	1,233		−3.2%
1850	1,344		9.0%
1860	1,355		0.8%
1870	1,365		0.7%
1880	1,579		15.7%
1890	1,828		15.8%
1900	2,061		12.7%
1910	2,005		−2.7%
1920	1,952		−2.6%
1930	1,832		−6.1%
1940	1,939		5.8%
1950	1,988		2.5%
1960	2,159		8.6%
1970	2,744		27.1%
1980	3,293		20.0%
1990	3,762		14.2%
2000	3,788		0.7%
2010	3,894		2.8%
2020	3,782		−2.9%
U.S. Decennial Census

As of the 2000 census, there were 3,788 people, 1,460 households, and 1,013 families residing in the town. The population density was 90.7 people per square mile (35.0 people/km^{2}). There were 1,546 housing units at an average density of 37.0 per square mile (14.3/km^{2}). The racial makeup of the town was 98.42% White, 0.24% African American, 0.13% Native American, 0.40% Asian, 0.11% from other races, and 0.71% from two or more races. Hispanic or Latino of any race were 0.50% of the population.

There were 1,460 households, out of which 37.1% had children under the age of 18 living with them, 54.1% were married couples living together, 10.1% had a female householder with no husband present, and 30.6% were non-families. 22.9% of all households were made up of individuals, and 8.5% had someone living alone who was 65 years of age or older. The average household size was 2.58 and the average family size was 3.03.

In the town, the population was spread out, with 27.7% under the age of 18, 7.0% from 18 to 24, 30.7% from 25 to 44, 23.7% from 45 to 64, and 10.9% who were 65 years of age or older. The median age was 37 years. For every 100 females, there were 95.8 males. For every 100 females age 18 and over, there were 94.2 males.

The median income for a household in the town was $43,250, and the median income for a family was $48,458. Males had a median income of $33,977 versus $23,602 for females. The per capita income for the town was $19,345. About 6.9% of families and 10.4% of the population were below the poverty line, including 14.9% of those under age 18 and 11.1% of those age 65 or over.

=== 2020 census ===
Bristol Town racial composition
Race	Num.	Perc.
White (non-Hispanic)	4,160	92.21%
Black or African American (non-Hispanic)	13	0.34%
Native American	2	0.053%
Asian	27	0.72%
Pacific Islander	0	0
Other/Mixed	186	4.62%
Hispanic or Latino	78	2.07%

== Education ==
Bristol is part of the Mount Abraham Unified School District, which serves the towns of Bristol, Lincoln, Monkton, New Haven, and Starksboro. Bristol is home to Bristol Elementary School and Mount Abraham Union Middle/High School. Additionally, Bristol is served by the Patricia A. Hannaford Career Center, which provides career and technical education programs for high school students and adult learners, preparing them for success in the workforce and beyond.

== Economy ==
Bristol was once home to the now defunct Freemountain Toys, known for producing stuffed vegetable toys known as Vegimals. The Peas in a Pod in the movie Toy Story 3 are based on the peas Vegimal.

== Media ==
Northeast Addison Television (NEAT TV) - Channel 16 is the local public-access television cable TV station.

The feature film The Wizard of Loneliness (1988),' a period piece set during World War II starring Lukas Haas, Lea Thompson and Dylan Baker, was filmed in Bristol. The production company installed period street lights on Main Street that are still there today.

== Climate ==
Climate data for Bristol, Vermont
Month	Jan	Feb	Mar	Apr	May	Jun	Jul	Aug	Sep	Oct	Nov	Dec	Year
Mean daily maximum °F	25.5	29.1	37.6	51.1	63.9	72.1	76.3	74.5	66.9	54.7	43.5	31.3	52.3
Daily mean °F	15.4	18.3	27.0	41.0	52.9	61.5	65.8	64.0	56.1	44.8	34.9	22.5	42.1
Mean daily minimum °F	5.4	7.5	16.5	30.9	41.9	51.1	55.2	53.8	45.3	34.7	26.4	13.6	32.0
Average precipitation inches	2.80	2.40	3.10	3.80	4.40	4.60	5.00	5.40	4.10	5.00	4.10	3.50	48.00
Average snowfall inches	26.2	23.7	22.1	9.3	0.6	—	—	—	—	2.3	11.0	29.1	124.3
Mean daily maximum °C	−3.6	−1.6	3.1	10.6	17.7	22.3	24.6	23.6	19.4	12.6	6.4	−0.4	11.3
Daily mean °C	−9.2	−7.6	−2.8	5.0	11.6	16.4	18.8	17.8	13.4	7.1	1.6	−5.3	5.6
Mean daily minimum °C	−14.8	−13.6	−8.6	−0.6	5.5	10.6	12.9	12.1	7.4	1.5	−3.1	−10.2	0.0
Average precipitation mm	71.1	61.0	78.7	96.5	111.8	116.8	127.0	137.2	104.1	127.0	104.1	88.9	1,219.2
Average snowfall cm	66.5	60.2	56.1	23.6	1.5	—	—	—	—	5.8	27.9	73.9	315.7
Average precipitation days	15.8	12.5	14.7	13.8	15.1	15.0	13.1	12.8	12.2	14.5	14.9	16.1	170.5
Average snowy days	13.3	10.3	10.4	4.0	0.4	—	—	—	—	1.2	5.7	12.5	57.8

== Notable people ==
- Chris Bohjalian, writer
- Jeremiah Curtin, writer and translator
- Walter C. Dunton, Justice of the Vermont Supreme Court
- Ezra Butler Eddy, Canadian businessman and political figure
- Ethan Sonneborn, activist and 2018 Vermont gubernatorial candidate
