= Brown Covered Bridge =

- U.S. National Register of Historic Places
- U.S. National Historic Landmark
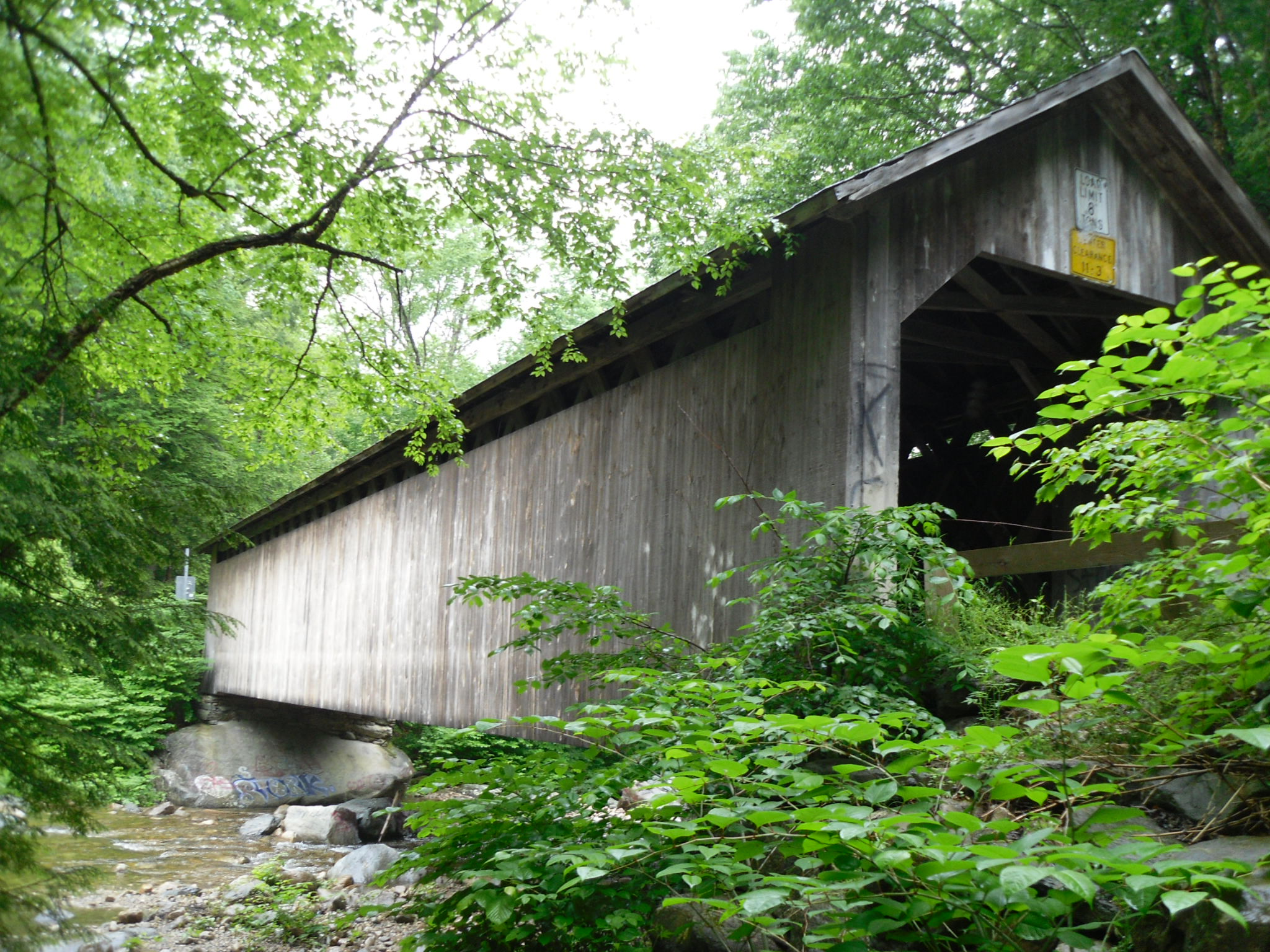
- Bridge in 2010

- Location within Vermont Location within the United States
- Nearest city: Rutland, Vermont
- Coordinates: 43°33′59″N 72°55′08″W
- Built: 1880
- Architect: Powers, Nichols M.
- Architectural style: Town Lattice
- NRHP reference No.: 74000250

Significant dates
- Added to NRHP: January 21, 1974
- Designated NHL: August 25, 2014

The Brown Covered Bridge is a wooden covered bridge in Shrewsbury, Vermont. Located in the northwestern part of the town, it carries Upper Cold River Road over the Cold River. It was closed to vehicular traffic in 2011 due to damage from Hurricane Irene and reopened on July 5, 2016. Built in 1880 by noted Vermont bridgewright Nichols M. Powers, it was designated a National Historic Landmark in 2014, cited as one of the finest and least-altered examples of a Town lattice truss covered bridge in the United States.

== Description and history ==
The Brown Covered Bridge is set in a remote wooded ravine in northwestern Shrewsbury, about 5 miles (8.0 km) southeast of Rutland, Vermont. The bridge is a single span lattice truss of a type patented by architect Ithiel Town in 1820. It is 100 feet (30 m) in length, and rests on stone abutments that have been capped in concrete. One of the abutments includes an extremely large boulder, a clear adaptation of the bridge to its location. The bridge is believed to be the only standing covered bridge in the United States with a slate roof, a once-common local variant feature of area covered bridges. It has vertical weatherboard siding, with a small opening at the eaves. The bridge has a roadway width of 13 feet 6 inches (4.11 m). The bridge has received only routine maintenance throughout its lifespan, most recently in 2002, when it was resided and its abutments treated. The Brown Bridge sustained minor damage from flooding caused by Tropical Storm Irene in 2011, and was closed. It was slated for rehabilitation after a 2008 inspection.

This bridge was not the first to stand on the site, with maps of the area showing a crossing here as early as the mid 19th century. The location is about 100 yards (91 m) northwest of the home of George Brown, for whom the bridge was named. It was built in 1880 at a cost of less than $1100, by Nichols M. Powers, a noted Vermont bridgewright who then lived in nearby Clarendon. It is the last bridge known to have been built by Powers, who died in 1897. Powers' most famous work, the Old Blenheim Bridge in Schoharie, New York, was destroyed by flooding caused by Irene in 2011.

The bridge was listed on the National Register of Historic Places in 1974. It is one of about 110 surviving Town lattice truss bridges built before 1955, and was identified as one of a few high-quality covered bridges in a nationwide survey conducted by the National Park Service in the 2000s. The bridge was designated a National Historic Landmark in 2014.

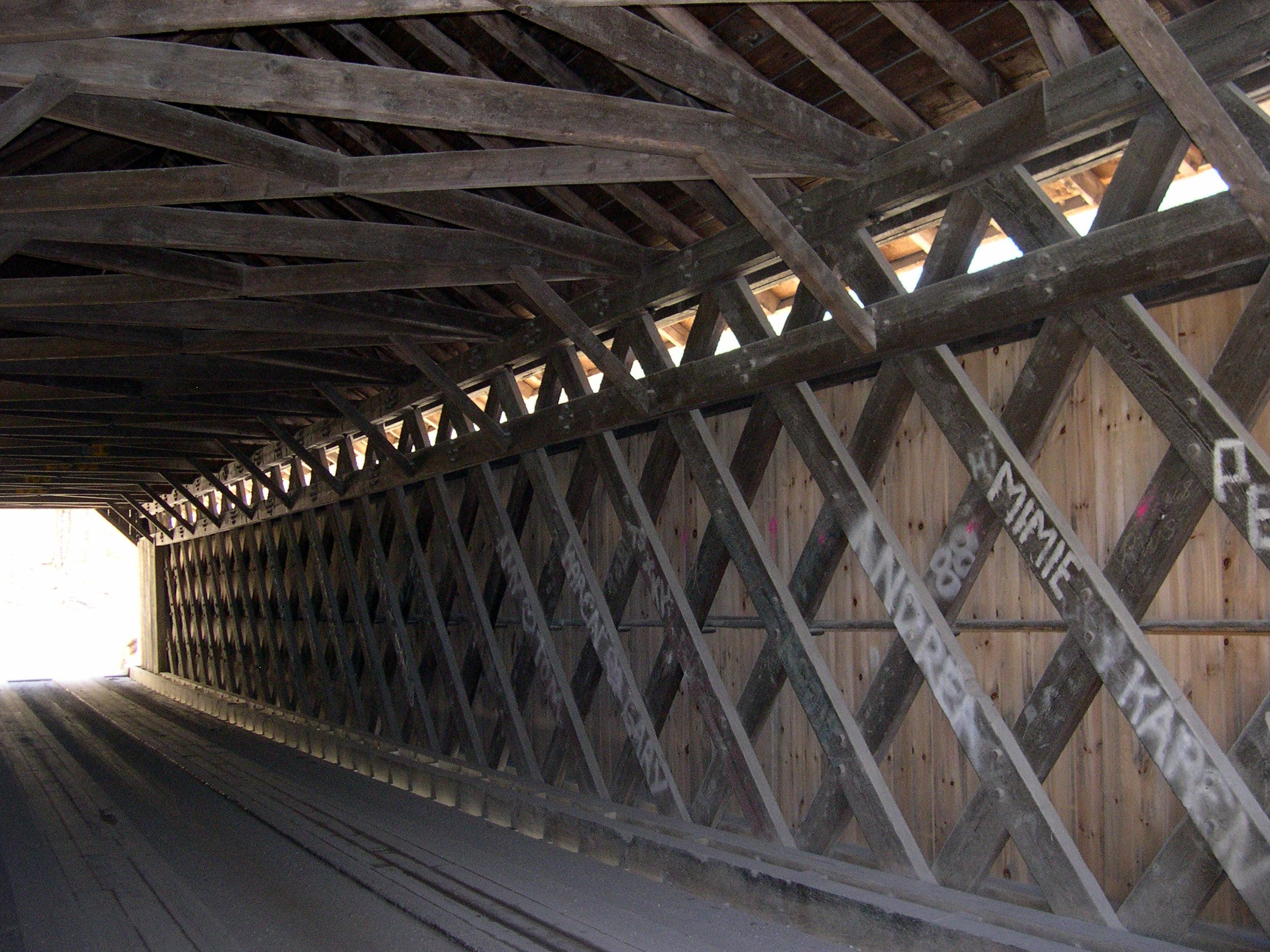
Lattice

== See also ==
- List of Vermont covered bridges
- List of bridges documented by the Historic American Engineering Record in Vermont
- List of National Historic Landmarks in Vermont
- National Register of Historic Places listings in Rutland County, Vermont
