= Tuttle Publishing =

American book publishing company

- Parent company: Periplus Publishing Group
- Founded: 1948; 77 years ago
- Founder: Charles E. Tuttle
- Country of origin: United States of America
- Headquarters location: North Clarendon, Vermont
- Distribution: Simon & Schuster (US); Publishers Group Canada (Canada); Publishers Group UK (UK); Self-distributed (Southeast Asia and Japan)
- Key people: Eric Oey (Publisher and CEO); Michael Sargent (Manager)
- Publication types: Books
- No. of employees: 18 (estimated, 2013)
- Official website: tuttlepublishing.com

Tuttle Publishing, originally the Charles E. Tuttle Company, is a book publishing company that includes Tuttle, Periplus Editions, and Journey Editions. A company profile describes it as an "International publisher of innovative books on design, cooking, martial arts, language, travel and spirituality with a focus on China, Japan and Southeast Asia." Many of its books on Asian martial arts, particularly those on Japanese martial arts, were the first widely read publications on these subjects in the English language.

== History ==
Publisher and book dealer Charles E. Tuttle (1915–1993) founded the company in 1948 in Tokyo, Japan, with the aim of publishing "books to span the East and West." It was the 31st corporation approved by the occupying Allied administration. In its first year of operation, the company imported and distributed U.S. paperback publications to the occupying forces, and the next year, it released its first publication. From 1951, it published many books on the Japanese language, arts, and culture, as well as translations of Japanese works into the English language.

In 1953, part of the company was separated to form a new, partially owned company, Yohan, which took on responsibility for distributing U.S. paperback books and magazines. The Charles E. Tuttle Company retained responsibility for distributing UK publications. In 1991, under chief executive Peter Ackroyd,^{[a]} a planned acquisition of the Atlantic Monthly Press failed to eventuate. According to executives, "Tuttle, which specializes in Japanese and other Asian books, came to feel that it was putting its existing business at risk by acquiring Atlantic." In 1996, the company changed its name to Tuttle Publishing.

Since its founding, Tuttle has published more than 6,000 books and today maintains an active backlist of around 2,000 titles. The company now produces 150 new titles each year, most of which still focus on the areas of Asian interest that Tuttle has long been known for—everything from Asian literature and language learning to cooking, art, crafts, and design.

Some of the company’s books state that it was founded in 1832 in Rutland, Vermont. George Albert Tuttle (1816-1885), a direct ancestor of Charles E. Tuttle, founded Tuttle Co. in 1832 in Rutland as a printing company that printed newspapers, later including the Rutland Herald. The multigenerational family printing business did not have a particular focus on Asian material. It thus remains open to debate whether 1832 represents the original founding of Tuttle Publishing, or whether the enterprise is, in the words of one author, the business of Charles E. Tuttle, "whose family had been in the book trade since 1832."

== Founder ==
The company's founder, Charles Egbert Tuttle, Jr., was a graduate of Phillips Exeter Academy and Harvard University. He enlisted in the U.S. military and was stationed in Japan immediately after World War II, working on General Douglas MacArthur’s staff. His job, among other things, was to help revive the Japanese publishing industry after the war. After his military service was completed, he decided to stay on in Japan and set up his own business importing English-language books and magazines and exporting rare Japanese antiquarian books to U.S. libraries.

Tuttle came from a distinguished New England publishing family. His father, Charles E. Tuttle Sr., ran Tuttle Antiquarian Books—one of several Tuttle companies in Rutland, Vermont, that had been involved with printing and publishing since the 1830s. At university, he studied American history and literature. After graduating in 1937, he worked in the library of Columbia University for a year, then joined the family business. His interest in publishing 'quality' books about Japan and Asia, and his keen eye for design and editorial matters as a publisher, grew out of an appreciation for the valuable antiquarian books that he dealt with as a youth.

== Current status ==
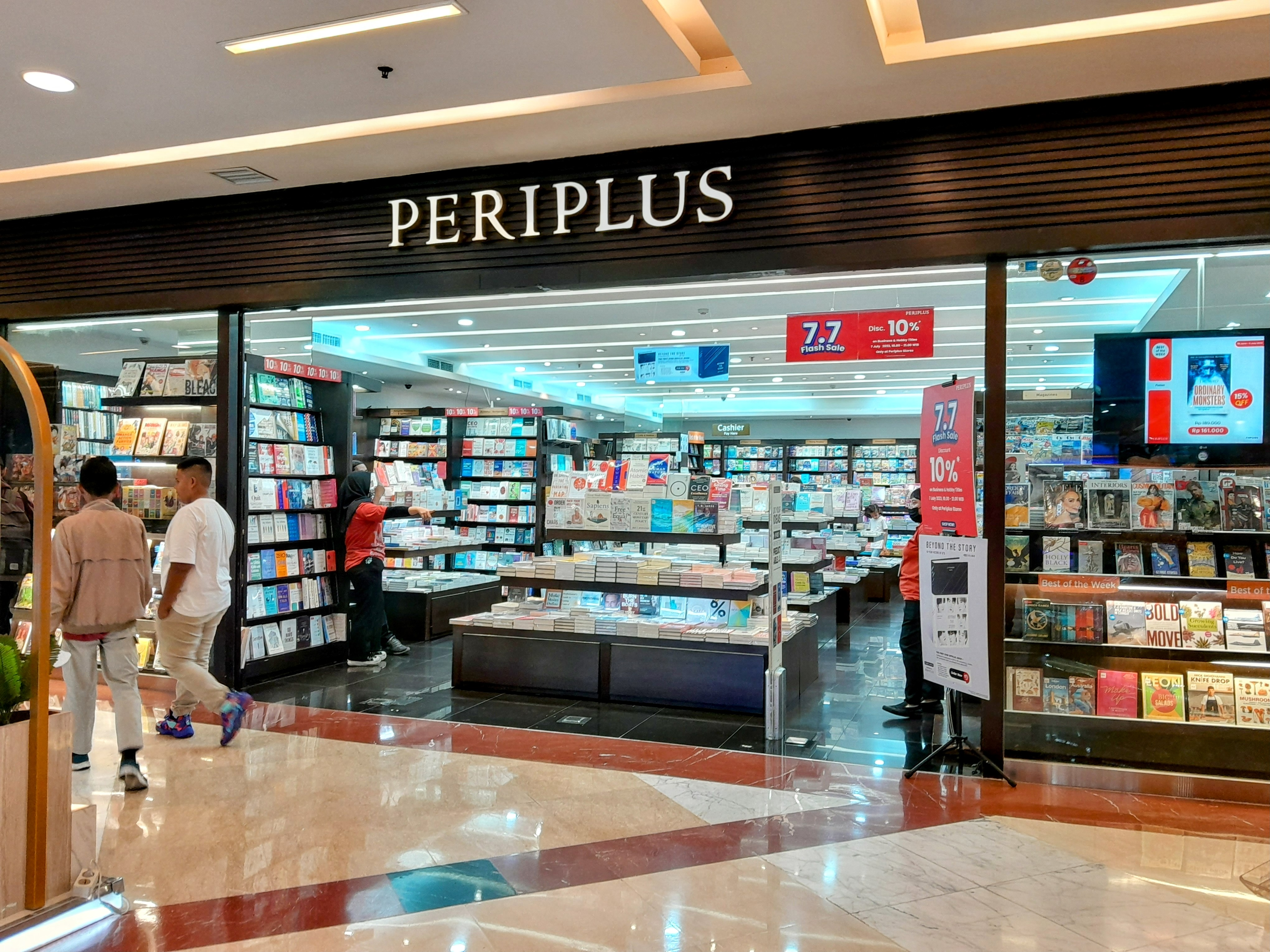
A Periplus Bookshops branch in Pondok Indah Mall, part of Periplus Publishing Group and where most of Tuttle Publishing books are offered for sale in Indonesia

Tuttle publishes between 150-175 new books each year, including cooking, craft, history, art, architecture, current affairs, travel, origami, gardening and children's titles. Many early Tuttle books remain in print today, such as Japanese Children's Favorite Stories (1954), The Book of Tea (1956) and Rashomon and Other Stories (1952). Tuttle is also the official publisher of the Bruce Lee Library, with permission from his estate.

The company's bestselling books include Japanese Knitting Stitch Bible by Hitomi Shida, which has sold more than 60,000 copies since its release in 2017 and was in its fifth printing in 2018, Others include Cool Japan Guide by Abby Denson, North Korea Confidential by Daniel Tudor and James Pearson, and Geek in Japan by Hector Garcia. Tuttle Publishing is a part of Periplus Publishing Group and has a staff of around 60 people split between its offices in North Clarendon (in Vermont, USA), Singapore and Tokyo. Tuttle is one of the few American publishers with offices in Asia.

According to UNESCO (2002, 2007), Tuttle Publishing is the most active publisher of books teaching Japanese to the English-speaking world, and English to the Japanese-speaking world. The company has also published books on Tagalog, Chinese, Korean, Indonesian, Burmese, Cambodian, Lao, Malay, Thai, and Vietnamese. Tuttle published its first Arabic phrasebook in 2004 and, in 2009, its first introduction to Modern Standard Hindi.

The editors work collaboratively with writers, illustrators, photographers and designers around the world. The company has a strong international network of distributors and booksellers—with Tuttle books distributed not only in North America and Asia, but from Europe to Australia and the Middle East to South Africa. Parent company Periplus Publishing Group has a bookstore chain in Indonesia with the same name (founded in 1985), which distributed and sold Tuttle books as well as books and magazines from other publishers.

Singapore resident Eric Oey took over the company as publisher and CEO in 1996. Oey is a nephew of Charles E. Tuttle and the founder of Periplus Editions.

== See also ==
- List of book distributors

== Explanatory notes ==
a. This is not the same person as the British author by the same name.
