= Joseph and Daniel Marsh House =

Historic house in Vermont, United States

- U.S. National Register of Historic Places
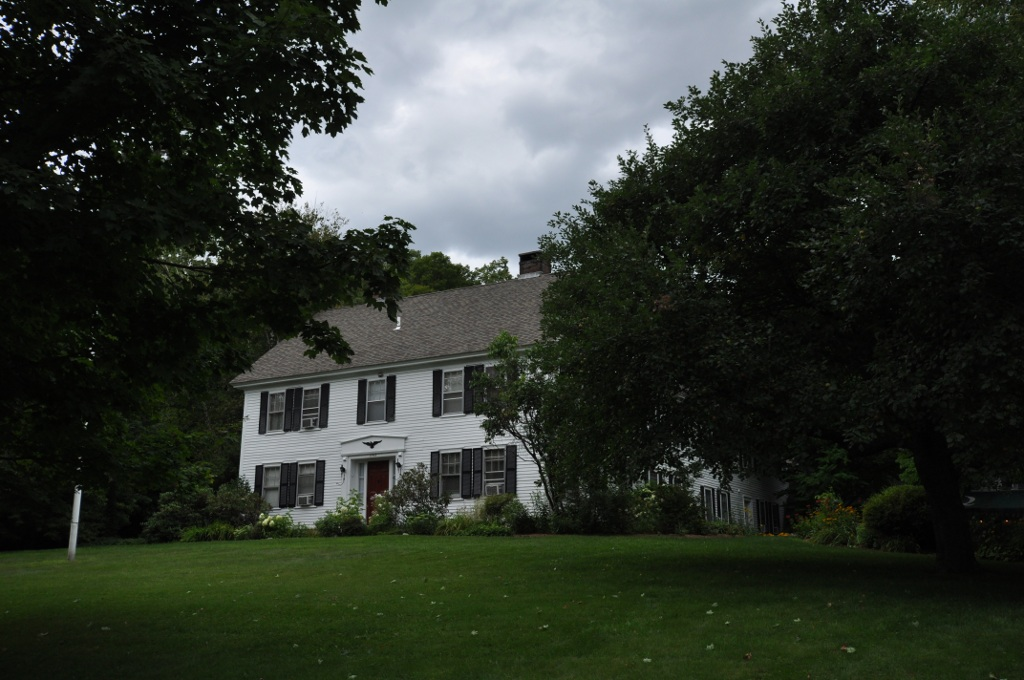

- Location within Vermont Location within the United States
- Location: 1119 Quechee Main St., Hartford, Vermont
- Coordinates: 43°38′54.7″N 72°24′27″W
- Area: 5.4 acres (2.2 ha)
- Built: 1793
- Built by: Joseph Marsh
- NRHP reference No.: 98001149
- Added to NRHP: September 3, 1998

The Joseph and Daniel Marsh House is a historic farmstead at 1119 Quechee Main Street, just outside the village Quechee in Hartford, Vermont. Built in 1793, it was the home of Joseph Marsh, one of Hartford's early settlers and the first Lieutenant Governor of Vermont. Now the Quechee Inn, the property was listed on the National Register of Historic Places in 1998.

== Description and history ==
The Marsh House farmstead stands on the north side of Quechee Main Street, near a point where the Ottauquechee River, just across the street, bends south with Dewey's Pond just to the east. The complex includes the main house, three barns, and a wagon shed/hen house. The main house faces south, and consists of a 2 1/2-story main block with a series of ells extending to the rear. The house has modest vernacular Federal styling, with a recessed entry flanked by sidelight windows. The recess opening is framed by pilasters with a crown pediment above. The interior has a typical Georgian center hall plan, and retains many original finishes and hardware fixtures. To the north of the house is a large cow barn, dating to the 1870s, to which a smaller horse barn has been joined at one corner; these buildings have been adapted as facilities of the inn that now occupies the property. To the west of this pair stand a corn barn and the hen house/wagon shed.

The Marsh family was among the first to be granted land in the Quechee area after the town of Hartford was chartered in 1761. Joseph Marsh was a prominent local citizen, leading a regiment of colonial militia in the American Revolutionary War, and serving on the committee that drafted the constitution of the independent Vermont Republic in 1777. He then served as lieutenant governor under Thomas Chittenden. He built this house in 1793. It was originally located a short way east and south of its present location, the move necessitated by a local flood control project conducted by the United States Army Corps of Engineers in the 1960s. It is here that Marsh's son Charles, a noted lawyer and father of George Perkins Marsh, was raised. John Porter, a later owner, was a prominent local businessman and politician, serving in the state legislature and on the boards of several area banks.

In 1959, the property was taken by the Army Corps of Engineers (ACE) and condemned as part of the North Hartland Dam flood control project. Its owners were able to recover the house and what are now the remaining outbuildings, by moving or raising them above the ACE's mandated high-water elevation. Several outbuildings that were not moved were buried under fill, and remain in situ. In 1975, the property was opened as the Quechee Inn.

== See also ==
- National Register of Historic Places listings in Windsor County, Vermont
