= Stephen Jacob =

American judge (1755–1817)

Associate Justice of the Vermont Supreme Court
- In office 1801–1803
- Preceded by: Lot Hall
- Succeeded by: Theophilus Harrington

Member of the Vermont Governor's Council
- In office 1796–1802
- Preceded by: Paul Brigham
- Succeeded by: Eliakim Spooner

United States Attorney for the District of Vermont
- In office 1791–1794
- Preceded by: None (Position created)
- Succeeded by: Amos Marsh

State's Attorney of Windsor County, Vermont
- In office 1781–1796
- Preceded by: None (position created)
- Succeeded by: Amasa Paine

Personal details
- Born: December 7, 1755 Sheffield, Massachusetts, British America
- Died: January 27, 1817 (aged 61) Windsor, Vermont, U.S.
- Resting place: Old South Church Cemetery, Windsor, Vermont, U.S.
- Party: Federalist
- Spouse: Pamela Farrand (m. 1779)
- Children: 6
- Relatives: Daniel Farrand (brother in law)
- Education: Dartmouth College (attended); Yale University (A.B.)
- Profession: Attorney

Military service
- Allegiance: United States; Republic of Vermont
- Service: Massachusetts Militia; Vermont Militia
- Years of service: 1777 (Massachusetts); 1781 (Vermont)
- Rank: Private
- Unit: Spoor's Company (Massachusetts); Mercy's Company (Vermont)
- Wars: American Revolutionary War: Battles of Saratoga

Stephen Jacob (December 7, 1755 – January 27, 1817) (his last name is sometimes spelled "Jacobs", and his birth date is sometimes given as 1754) was an attorney, politician, and judge during Vermont's years as an independent republic and the early years of its statehood. He served as a Justice of the Vermont Supreme Court from 1801 to 1802.

== Biography ==
Stephen Jacob was born in Sheffield, Massachusetts on December 7, 1755, the son of Richard and Thankful Jacob. He was raised in Sheffield and served in the militia during the American Revolutionary War, including participation in the Battles of Saratoga. He attended Dartmouth College, graduated from Yale University in 1778, and then relocated to Vermont. He first attracted public notice in August 1778, when he read a poem he had composed at a ceremony to commemorate the first anniversary of the Battle of Bennington.

Jacob studied law with Theodore Sedgwick, settled in Windsor, Vermont in 1780, and attained admission to the bar. He continued his Revolutionary War militia service, and served in the company commanded by Captain John Mercy during a three-day mobilization in March 1781. The militia in eastern Vermont had been called out by General Jacob Bayley of Newbury in response to a report of British troops from Canada operating in the Newbury area, but the report proved unfounded.

Jacob practiced law in Vermont, and became active in politics and government, including service as town meeting moderator, selectman, lister, and justice of the peace. Among the other offices he held were: member of the Vermont House of Representatives (1781, 1788, 1794); Clerk of the House (1788, 1789); member of the Council of Censors (1785) (The Council of Censors met every seven years to review actions of the governor and executive council and the legislature to ensure their constitutionality); and State's Attorney of Windsor County (1781–1796).

In 1786, an anti-tax protest took place in Windsor, inspired in large part by Shays' Rebellion; As state's attorney, Jacob worked with Sheriff Benjamin Wait to mobilize 70 members of the local militia, who forced the protesters to end their demonstration and return to their homes.

In 1789 Vermont and New York created a commission to settle their longstanding dispute over land titles in preparation for Vermont's admission to the Union as the 14th state, and Jacob served as one of the commissioners. When Vermont was admitted to the Union in 1791, Jacob identified with the Federalist Party, and was appointed the first United States Attorney for the District of Vermont; he served until 1794, when he was succeeded by Amos Marsh. Jacob was a delegate to the 1793 state constitutional convention, and chief judge of the Windsor County court in 1791, and from 1797 to 1801. He was a member of the Governor's Council from 1796 to 1802, a trustee of Middlebury College from 1800 to 1810, and a Dartmouth College trustee from 1802 until his death. He served as a justice of the Vermont Supreme Court from 1801 to 1802.

== Slavery case ==
During Vermont's early history a small number of African American individuals seem to have been illegally bought and sold by some of its white settlers. Despite Vermont's constitutional prohibition against involuntary servitude, these individuals appear to have been de facto slaves. In 1783, Jacob purchased from Jotham White of Charlestown, New Hampshire a black woman named Dinah, who was about 30 years old. In 1801, the selectmen of Windsor sued Jacob, claiming that Dinah (sometimes called Dinah Mason or Dinah White in recent years) was too sick to work. She then fell under the care of the selectmen in their capacity as overseers of the poor, and they took Jacob to court in an effort to recover the public money they had spent on her care.

Jacob presided over the trial, which was held in the Windsor County Court. His lawyers argued that the case should be dismissed because the court summons he had been served was presented by a deputy sheriff, who could be considered a plaintiff, and plaintiffs were legally prohibited from carrying out such activities. The other judges on the court, Assistant Judges Elijah Robinson and Jesse Williams, found in his favor and awarded him court costs.

The town of Windsor then appealed to the Vermont Supreme Court; Jacob was a Justice at the time, and recused himself from hearing the case. The attorneys for the town presented a copy of Jacob's 1783 bill of sale and receipt for the transaction involving Dinah, and argued that she was a de facto slave, which made Jacob liable for her support. Jacob's attorneys argued that since slavery was illegal in Vermont, Jacob could not be considered Dinah's owner, and was therefore not responsible to support her. In addition, his attorneys argued that certain residents of Windsor had in fact hired Dinah away from Jacob's household, and that she had worked for them after having worked for Jacob, which made them liable for Dinah's support. The court ruled that the bill of sale was not admissible as evidence because slavery violated the state constitution; as a result, Dinah was considered not to have been a slave, and Jacob not to have been her master, so he was not liable for her support. The judges again awarded Jacob court costs. Dinah died in 1809.

== Death and burial ==
Jacob continued to practice law in Windsor until his death there on January 27, 1817. (Some sources including his gravestone incorrectly indicate 1816.) He was buried at Old South Church Cemetery in Windsor.

== Family ==
In 1779, Jacob married Pamela Farrand; they were the parents of:

- Laura L. (1780–1826)
- Harriet Pamela (1781–1857), the wife of Samuel W. Fitch
- Richard Henry (1784–1791)
- Maria (1791–1821), the wife of Army Surgeon Walter V. Wheaton
- Frances (1794–1797)
- Daniel Farrand (1802–1802)

Daniel Farrand, who also served on the Vermont Supreme Court, was Jacob's brother-in-law.

== Legacy ==
Jacob received the honorary degree of Master of Arts from Yale University in 1788, and an honorary Master of Arts from Dartmouth College in 1803.

Jacob's Windsor home, called the Stephen Jacob House, is owned by Historic Windsor, Inc./Preservation Education Institute. It has been the subject of preservation efforts since 2008.

== Sources ==
=== Books ===
- Aldrich, Lewis Cass; Holmes, Frank R. (1891). History of Windsor County, Vermont. Syracuse, NY: D. Mason & Co. p. 296.
- Crockett, Walter Hill (1923). Vermont: The Green Mountain State. Vol. Five. New York, NY: The century History Company.
- Dexter, Samuel Bowditch (1907). Biographical Sketches of the Graduates of Yale College. Vol. IV. New York, NY: Henry Holt and Company.
- Gales, Joseph (1834). Debates and Proceedings in the Congress of the United States. Washington, DC: Gales and Seaton. p. 1647.
- Goodrich, John E. (1904). Rolls of the Soldiers in the Revolutionary War, 1775 to 1783. Rutland, VT: The Tuttle Company. p. 352.
- Massachusetts Secretary of the Commonwealth (1901). Massachusetts Soldiers and Sailors of the Revolutionary War. Vol. 8. Boston, MA: Wright & Porter.
- Ullery, Jacob G. (1894). Men of Vermont Illustrated. Brattleboro, VT: Transcript Publishing Company. p. 178.
- United States Senate (1828). Journal of the Executive Proceedings of the Senate of the United States. Vol. 1. Washington, DC: Duff Green.
- Vermont Bar Association (1892). Report of Proceedings of the Annual Meeting, 1891. Vol. 3. Montpelier, VT: Argus and Patriot Job and Book Printing.
- Walton, E. P. (1875). Records of the Council of Safety and Governor and Council of the State of Vermont. Vol. 3. Montpelier, VT: J. & J. M. Poland.
- Yale University (1916). Catalogue of the Officers and Graduates, 1701-1915. New Haven, CT: The Wilson H. Lee Company.

=== Magazines ===
- Taft, Russell S. (October 20, 1891). "A Memorial Sketch of Stephen Jacob". Report of Proceedings of the Annual Meeting, Volume 3. Montpelier, VT: Argus and Patriot Job and Book Printing.
- Taft, Russell S. (January 1, 1894). "The Supreme Court of Vermont, Part III". The Green Bag. Boston, MA: Boston Book Company.
- Wardner, H. S. (May 1, 1914). "Judge Jacob and his Dinah". The Vermonter. White River Junction, VT: Chas. R. Cummings.

=== Internet ===
- Cox, Heather (July 1, 2009). "The Stephen Jacob House" (PDF). preservationworks.org/. Windsor, VT: Historic Windsor, Inc./Preservation Education Institute.

=== Newspapers ===
- Taft, Russell S. (January 16, 1892). "Stephen Jacob: Twentieth Judge of the Vermont Supreme Court". Vermont Journal. Windsor, VT – via Newspapers.com.
- Johnson, Tim (April 2, 2014). "Vermont's 1777 slavery ban had a complicated reality". USA Today. McLean, VA.
