= Daniel Farrand =

American judge

Associate Justice of the Vermont Supreme Court
- In office 1813–1815
- Preceded by: Theophilus Harrington
- Succeeded by: Richard Skinner

Member of the Vermont House of Representatives
- In office 1802–1803
- Preceded by: David Sanderson
- Succeeded by: Levi Sabin
- Constituency: Rockingham

State's Attorney of Windham County, Vermont
- In office 1801–1804
- Preceded by: Royall Tyler
- Succeeded by: William C. Bradley

Speaker of the Vermont House of Representatives
- In office 1798–1799
- Preceded by: Abel Spencer
- Succeeded by: Amos Marsh

Member of the Vermont House of Representatives
- In office 1798–1799
- Preceded by: Thomas Johnson
- Succeeded by: Thomas Johnson
- Constituency: Newbury
- In office 1796–1797
- Preceded by: Thomas Johnson
- Succeeded by: Thomas Johnson
- Constituency: Newbury
- In office 1792–1794
- Preceded by: Joshua Bayley
- Succeeded by: Joshua Bayley
- Constituency: Newbury

State's Attorney of Orange County, Vermont
- In office 1798–1799
- Preceded by: Jedediah P. Buckingham
- Succeeded by: Oramel Hinckley
- In office 1785–1797
- Preceded by: Daniel Buck
- Succeeded by: Jedediah P. Buckingham

Personal details
- Born: September 9, 1760 Canaan, Connecticut, British North America
- Died: October 13, 1825 (aged 65) Burlington, Vermont, US
- Resting place: Elmwood Cemetery, Burlington, Vermont, US
- Party: Federalist
- Spouse: Mary Porter (m. 1794)
- Relations: Stephen Jacob (brother-in-law)
- Children: 9
- Education: Yale University
- Profession: Attorney

Daniel Farrand (September 9, 1760 – October 13, 1825) was a Vermont politician and lawyer who served as Speaker of the Vermont House of Representatives and a justice of the Vermont Supreme Court.

== Biography ==
Daniel Farrand was born in Canaan, Connecticut on September 9, 1760, a son of Reverend Daniel Farrand and Jerusha (Boardman) Farrand. He graduated from Yale University in 1781, studied law and moved to Vermont to establish a practice. Initially residing in Windsor, he subsequently moved to Newbury.

Farrand served in several local and county offices, including Orange County State's Attorney and register of probate and probate judge for the Bradford district. A Federalist, he served in the Vermont House of Representatives from 1791 to 1793 and 1796 to 1799. From 1798 to 1799 he served as Speaker of the House.

Farrand moved to Rockingham in the early 1800s. In addition to serving as Windham County State's Attorney he served in the Vermont House again from 1802 to 1803. In 1802 he was an unsuccessful candidate for the United States House of Representatives, losing to James Elliott.

In 1813 Farrand served on the Vermont Council of Censors. The same year he was also elected to the Vermont Supreme Court, serving to 1815.

After leaving the court Farrand moved to Burlington, where he continued to practice law. In 1817 he was head of the welcoming committee that received President James Monroe during Monroe's tour of New England, and he delivered the welcoming address.

Farrand died in Burlington on October 13, 1825 and was buried at Elmwood Cemetery.

Stephen Jacob, who also served on the Vermont Supreme Court, was his brother-in-law; Jacob was married to Farrand's sister Pamela.

Political offices
Preceded by Abel Spencer	Speaker of the Vermont House of Representatives; 1798–1799	Succeeded by Amos Marsh
