= Cold River Bridge (Clarendon, Vermont) =

- U.S. National Register of Historic Places
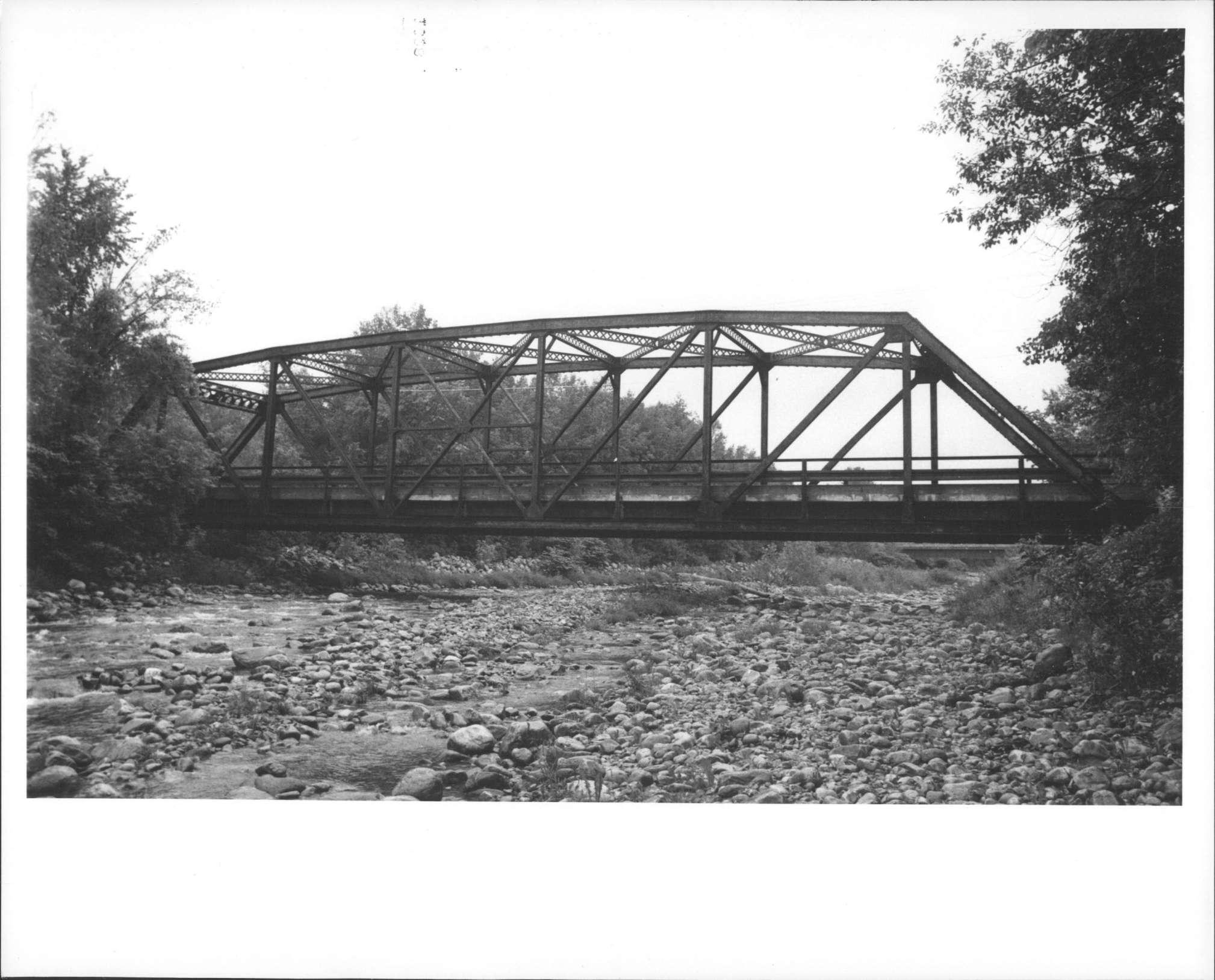
- 1985 survey photo

- Location within Vermont Location within the United States
- Location: VT 7B over the Cold River, Clarendon, Vermont
- Coordinates: 43°34′12″N 72°57′59″W
- Area: less than one acre
- Built: 1928
- Built by: American Bridge Co.
- Architectural style: Parker through truss
- MPS: Metal Truss, Masonry, and Concrete Bridges in Vermont MPS
- NRHP reference No.: 91001608
- Added to NRHP: November 14, 1991

The Cold River Bridge was a historic bridge that carried Vermont Route 7B (VT 7B) across the Cold River in Clarendon, Vermont. The bridge, a steel Parker through truss, was built by the American Bridge Company in 1928, and was one of many bridges built in the state in the wake of devastating 1927 floods. It carried U.S. Route 7 (US 7) until bypassed by a bridge to the east, and was closed in 1989. It was listed on the National Register of Historic Places in 1991. It was subsequently demolished after a report noting substantial failures.

== Description and history ==
The Cold River flows westward across northern Clarendon, en route to its confluence with Otter Creek. The Cold River Bridge carried VT 7B, a former alignment of US 7, across the river, a short way south of VT 7B's northern junction with US 7. It was about 150 feet (46 m) in length, with a deck 24.5 feet (7.5 m) wide, and rested on poured concrete abutments. Its trusses consisted of rolled steel I-beams, fastened together by rivets. It had a portal clearance of just under 15 feet (4.6 m). It had a concrete deck on steel stringers.

The bridge was built in 1928, part of a state program that constructed about 1,600 bridges between the 1927 floods and 1930. This bridge's trusses were built by the American Bridge Company, then the nation's leading maker of steel bridge trusses. It used construction materials and methods standardized by the state to improve the efficiency and speed at which bridges could be built. This bridge carried US 7, western Vermont's major north–south transportation artery, until it was bypassed by a four-lane bridge to the east. The bridge was closed in 1989 due to deterioration of the bridge structure. A consultant's report in 1994 documented structural failure that damaged the southern abutment, and recommended demolition. The bridge has since been demolished.

== See also ==
- National Register of Historic Places listings in Rutland County, Vermont
- List of bridges on the National Register of Historic Places in Vermont
