= The Tao of Zen =

Book by Ray Grigg

- Author: Ray Grigg
- Language: English
- Series: Tuttle Library of Enlightenment
- Subject: Chinese philosophy, Taoism, Zen, Chinese Chán
- Publisher: Charles E. Tuttle Company
- Publication date: 1994
- Publication place: Canada
- Media type: Print (Hardcover)
- Pages: 357
- ISBN: 978-0-8048-1988-6
- OCLC: 29951933
- Preceded by: Zen Brushpoems
- Followed by: The New Lao Tzu: A Contemporary Tao Te Ching

The Tao of Zen is a nonfiction book by Canadian religious scholar Ray Grigg. In his reading of Zen, Grigg argues that to attain enlightenment, all that one has to do is "act naturally and spontaneously in accordance with the Tao." The book, which in the early 21st century has been called "influential...but not uncontested", was published by Charles E. Tuttle Company in 1994, and reprinted by Alva Press in 1999.

== Summary ==
The work argues that what we recognize as traditional Chinese Ch’an/Japanese Zen Buddhism is in fact almost entirely grounded in Chinese Taoist philosophy, though this fact is well shrouded by the persistence of Mahayana Buddhist institutional trappings. Utilizing an array of scholarly commentary on the two traditions and historical deduction from what can be considered to be the best primary source material available, the author traces the development of Taoism and Buddhism in China and Japan for two millennia.

The story unfolds in China as Buddhism appears on the scene and is accepted by the Chinese population as a “simplified version of Taoism” that the Western barbarians (subcontinent Indians and Central Asians, e.g. Tibetans, et al.) could understand. They shared many philosophical similarities that made Chinese acclimation to Buddhism much easier – but the more dogmatic ways in which Buddhism was practiced helped it to get the fast track on becoming the predominant religion in China.

Its predisposition to monastic institutionalization throughout the empire allowed it to eventually assimilate and co-opt Taoist perspectives. The dominance of the Ch’an Buddhist tradition was most responsible for this trend. However, when it was eventually exported to Japan, the Taoist strands had the opportunity in a new cultural framework to once again assert themselves.

Grigg is able to trace the submergence and eventual resurgence of Taoism in Japan and the modern West by identifying how its specific tendencies (paradox, nonduality, aversion to institutionalization, emphasis on informal and varied paths to enlightenment, focus on the practical matters of influencing the social world, etc.) clearly manifested themselves in very different times and places.

What he seeks to do in this book is vindicate the importance of Taoist thought in the Chinese religious history and displace the notion of Zen Buddhism as a coherent whole. To him, these are very different spiritual systems that only coexist today because of the almost wholly unacknowledged lingering of the original Buddhist colonization of Taoist China. The popularity of Zen today owes much more to its persistent Taoist origins than to Buddhist doctrine.

== Quotations ==
Grigg, like Shunryū Suzuki, argues that tzu-jan, or spontaneity, is inherent in human beings and is a natural state when they act without ego. He writes:

When people are naturally themselves, when they are unfashioned by any preconception about what they ought or ought not to be, and who they might or might not be, they inadvertently become one with the wholeness of things. This does not make them “perfect” according to some narrow system of idealistic judgment. But it does give them an integrity of being that intuitively and spontaneously follows a wisdom that is greater than themselves.

== Reception ==
English professor John G. Rudy argues that Grigg "tends, perhaps, to overstate the similarities between Taoism and Zen when he says at the head of his text: 'Zen is Taoism disguised as Buddhism'."

== Bibliography ==
- Grigg, Ray (1994) The Tao of Zen, Tuttle Publishing. ISBN 0-8048-1988-2
