= Abel Spencer =

American politician

Abel Spencer (December 4, 1758 – June 16, 1832) was a Vermont lawyer and politician who served as Speaker of the Vermont House of Representatives twice and was expelled from the House for theft.

== Biography ==
Abel Spencer was born in East Greenwich, Rhode Island on December 4, 1758. His family subsequently relocated to Clarendon, Vermont.

During the American Revolution he served in the Vermont Militia, but changed sides at the approach of John Burgoyne's army in the Saratoga campaign of 1777. (His father Benjamin, who served in the Vermont legislature and in other offices also sided with the British and relocated to Upper Canada.) Abel Spencer subsequently recanted his support of the British and was allowed to return to Clarendon after being assessed a fine of 1,000 pounds. In 1779 the legislature remitted half the fine.

Spencer subsequently studied law and attained admission to the bar. He represented Clarendon in the Vermont House of Representatives from 1791 to 1793 and 1796 to 1798. After relocating to Rutland Spencer represented his new hometown in the House from 1802 to 1803 and 1806 to 1807. He served as Speaker of the House from 1797 to 1798 and 1802 to 1803.

Spencer also served on the Vermont Governor's Council from 1798 to 1801 and was Rutland County State's Attorney from 1796 to 1803.

In 1798 Spencer ran unsuccessfully for the United States House of Representatives, and in 1802 he was the unsuccessful Federalist nominee for the United States Senate, losing to Israel Smith in the legislature's balloting by a vote of 111 to 85.

In 1807 Spencer was accused of the theft of ninety-three dollars in bank bills, the property of three other House members. He was expelled from the House in a unanimous vote.

After leaving the House Spencer relocated to Saint Armand, Quebec, Canada, where he died on June 16, 1832. He was buried Iberville's Episcopal Church Cemetery.

Political offices
Preceded by Lewis R. Morris	Speaker of the Vermont House of Representatives; 1797–1798	Succeeded by Daniel Farrand
Preceded by Amos Marsh	Speaker of the Vermont House of Representatives; 1802–1803	Succeeded by Theophilus Harrington
