= Charles E. Tuttle =

American publisher and book dealer

- Born: Charles Egbert Tuttle Jr. April 5, 1915; Rutland, Vermont
- Died: June 9, 1993 (aged 78); Rutland, Vermont
- Education: Harvard University
- Occupations: Publisher and book dealer
- Organization: Tuttle Publishing (formerly the Charles E. Tuttle Company)
- Spouse: Reiko Chiba Tuttle
- Awards: Order of the Sacred Treasure

Charles Egbert Tuttle Jr. (April 5, 1915 – June 9, 1993) was an American publisher and book dealer who was internationally recognized for his contributions to understanding between the English- and Japanese-speaking worlds. Belonging to a family long associated with publishing, he travelled to Japan in a military role at the end of World War II, and established a publishing company there. Tuttle was the founder and eponym of the Charles E. Tuttle Company, now named Tuttle Publishing. Many of his company's books on Asian martial arts, particularly those on Japanese martial arts, were the first widely read publications on these subjects in the English language.

== Early life ==
Tuttle was born on April 5, 1915, in Rutland, Vermont, United States of America. His family had long been involved in printing books and stationery, dating from the mid-19th century in the US, and tracing their history back to Richard Tottel in the late 16th century in London. His father, Charles E. Tuttle Sr., published African-American literature and dealt in rare books, and also worked closely with the Vermont Historical Society. Tuttle attended local schools, the Phillips Exeter Academy, and Harvard University for his education. At university, he studied American history and literature. After graduating in 1937, he worked in the library of Columbia University for a year, then joined the family business.

== Japan ==
In 1943, Tuttle's father died and, with World War II in progress, he enlisted in the United States Army. He completed officer training and, when the war ended, was selected as part of the Allied forces occupying Japan. He arrived in Tokyo in October 1945, expecting to take charge of the library of the Diet of Japan (as he had been ordered), only to find that General Douglas MacArthur's staff had changed his assignment. He spent the next two years helping the Japanese newspaper industry. In 1947, Tuttle met Reiko Chiba, who belonged to a wealthy Japanese family from Hokkaidō; the two were married in 1951.

Tuttle founded his publishing company in Tokyo in 1948, with the mission to publish "books to span the East and West." His company was the 31st corporation approved by the occupying administration. In its first year of operation, it imported and distributed US paperback publications to the occupying forces, and the next year, it released its first publication. In 1951, the company began an intensive publishing program, producing English translations of contemporary Japanese literature, dictionaries of Japanese and other Asian languages, books on Japanese art and culture, and books on Japanese martial arts. Notably, many of its books on Asian martial arts were the first widely read publications on these subjects in the English language.

== Later life ==
In 1971, the Association of American Publishers named Tuttle as its Publisher of the Year. In June 1978, he and his nephew, Tom Mori, founded the Tuttle-Mori Agency. In 1983, the Japanese government awarded him the Order of the Sacred Treasure, 3rd Class (Gold Rays with Neck Ribbon), for his contributions to the advancement of Japanese–American understanding. Through the late 1980s, Tuttle focused on the rare book business.

Following a brief illness, Tuttle died in his sleep on June 9, 1993, in his home town of Rutland, and was survived by his wife. Reiko Tuttle continued to run Charles E. Tuttle Company until 1996, when she sold the business to a cousin, Eric Oey and Tuttle Antiquarian Books until 2001, when she sold the business to two long-serving Tuttle company employees. She died on April 14, 2006, in Tokyo. Reflecting on the couple's contribution to Vermont, J. Kevin Graffagnino, Executive Director of the Vermont Historical Society, wrote: "Charles and Reiko Tuttle epitomized Vermont’s tradition of making a difference without fanfare or self-congratulation."
