= Harrison J. Peck =

American politician (1842–1913)

Harrison J. Peck (November 23, 1842 – February 12, 1913) was an American businessman, soldier, and politician.

Peck was born in Clarendon, Rutland County, Vermont. He went to the New Hampton Institute in Fairfax, Vermont and then enlisted in the 1st United States Sharpshooters under the command of William Y. W. Ripley of Vermont, during the American Civil War. Peck graduated from Albany Law School in Albany, New York and then settled in Shakopee, Scott County, Minnesota, in 1865, with his wife and family. Peck practiced law in Shakopee, Minnesota and was the editor and publisher of the Shakopee Agnus newspaper. Peck served in the Minnesota Senate from 1883 to 1886 and was involved with the Democratic Party. He also served as Mayor of Shakopee, Minnesota and as the Scott County Attorney.
