= Clarendon Congregational Church =

Historic church in Vermont, United States

- U.S. National Register of Historic Places
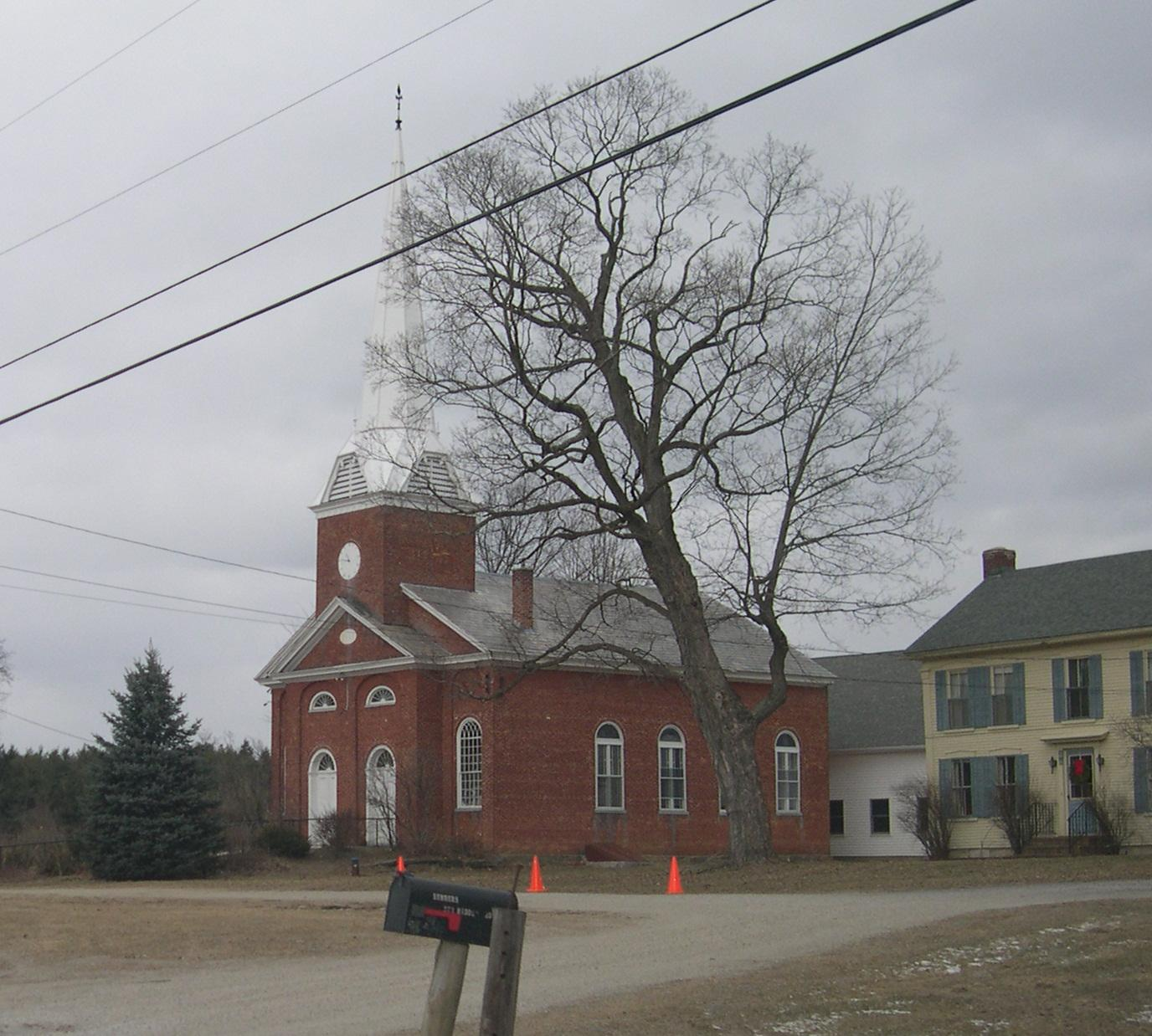

- Location within Vermont Location within the United States
- Location: 298 Middle Rd., Clarendon, Vermont
- Coordinates: 43°31′6″N 72°58′16″W
- Area: 0.6 acres (0.24 ha)
- Built: 1824
- Architectural style: Federal
- NRHP reference No.: 84003471
- Added to NRHP: July 12, 1984

The Clarendon Congregational Church (also known as the Old Brick Church and the Brick Church at Clarendon) is a historic church building at 298 Middle Road in Clarendon, Vermont. Built in 1824 and modified with Gothic features in the 1880s, it is a well-preserved 19th-century brick church. The building was listed on the National Register of Historic Places in 1984. The present minister is Rev. Bill Kingsley.

== Architecture and history ==
The Clarendon Congregational Church stands in the historic town center of Clarendon, opposite the town offices and facing the small town common on the east side of Middle Road in central Clarendon. It is a single-story brick building, covered by a gabled slate roof. A gabled entry pavilion projects from the main (western) facade, and a square tower rises above it to an octagonal steeple. It has tall sash windows, set in rounded-arch openings with half-round windows above the sashes. The projecting pavilion has a fully pedimented gable above a pair of entrances, and is two bays wide, each bay consisting of a slightly recessed panel housing an entrance (set, like the windows, in a round-arch opening with a half-round transom) and a semi-oval window above.

The church congregation was founded in 1822, and the present building was constructed in 1824, originally with a square belfry and plainer windows. Despite a declining town population, the church experienced a resurgence of membership in the 1880s, at which time its steeple was added (built by the noted bridgewright Nicholas Powers), and its more elaborate stained glass windows were installed. Membership continued to decline, and in the 1920s regular services were suspended. Services resumed in 1935, and in 1983 the congregation merged with another to form the Clarendon Congregational Church.

== See also ==
- National Register of Historic Places listings in Rutland County, Vermont
