= Charles Marsh Law Office =

- U.S. National Register of Historic Places
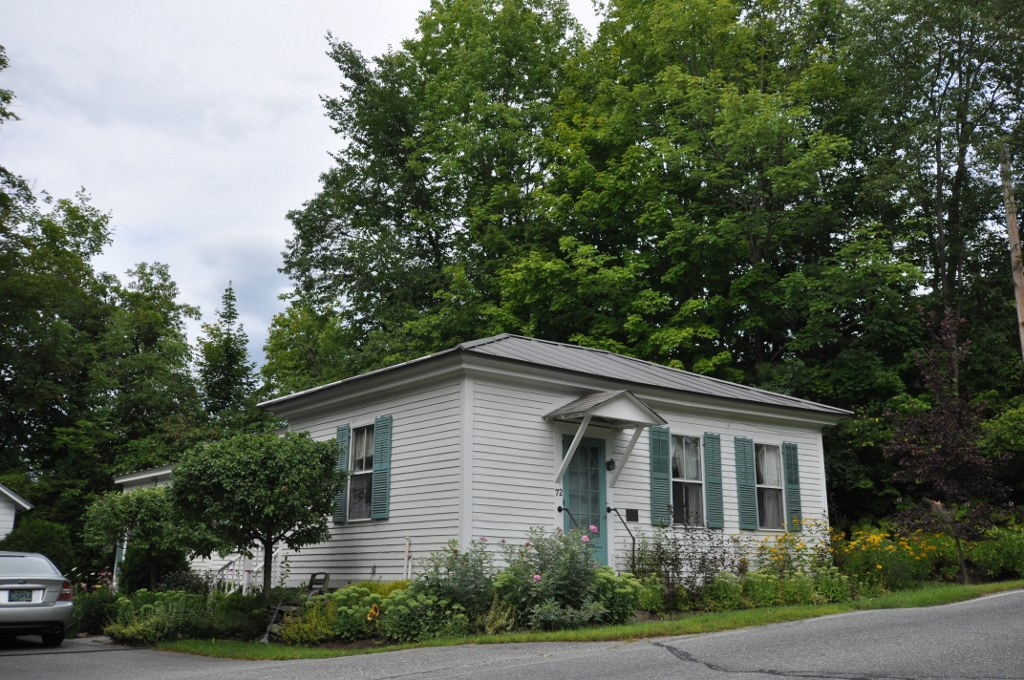

- Location within Vermont Location within the United States
- Location: 72 Hartland Hill Rd., Woodstock, Vermont
- Coordinates: 43°37′36″N 72°30′23″W
- Area: 0.3 acres (0.12 ha)
- Built: 1797
- NRHP reference No.: 94001449
- Added to NRHP: December 9, 1994

The Charles Marsh Law Office is a historic building at 72 Hartland Hill Road (formerly Pleasant Street) in Woodstock, Vermont. Now a private residence, this moved and altered structure, built about 1797, is the oldest surviving example of a detached law office in the state. It was built for lawyer Charles Marsh, and is where his sons George Perkins Marsh and Lyndon Arnold Marsh trained for and/or practiced law. The building was listed on the National Register of Historic Places in 1994.

== Description and history ==
The former Charles Law Office building stands on the north side of Hartland Hill Road, on the eastern outskirts of Woodstock village, just east of the junction with United States Route 4 (Pleasant and Woodstock Streets). The building now consists of a single-story hip-roofed structure, with two single-story ells telescoping to the rear. The building is finished in wooden clapboards, and the main block is a post-and-beam structure fashioned out of hand-hewn timbers. Its front facade is three bays wide, with the front entrance in the leftmost bay, sheltered by a simple gabled hood. A secondary entrance is located on the west side of the first ell, with an open porch for access. The building retains original builtin shelving and other fixtures from the 19th century.

When the main block was built about 1797, it was originally located nearer Woodstock's center, on Elm Street. It was moved a short distance in 1806, and in 1876 it was moved to eastern Pleasant Street, at which time it was converted from a law office into a grain store. In 1880 it was moved to its present location, and adapted for residential use. It was built for Charles Marsh, a prominent lawyer and politician of the late 18th and early 19th centuries. Marsh trained two of his four sons, George Perkins Marsh and Lyndon Arnold Marsh, in the law, and the latter eventually took over his practice. George Perkins Marsh became well known as a politician and diplomat, and for his early writings on conservation and preservation of open spaces. (The Marsh House is a centerpiece of Marsh-Billings-Rockefeller National Historical Park, on Woodstock's north side.)

== See also ==
- Wheelock Law Office: NRHP listing in Barre, Vermont (city)
- National Register of Historic Places listings in Windsor County, Vermont
