= Lot Hall =

American judge (1757–1809)

Associate Justice of the Vermont Supreme Court
- In office 1794–1800
- Preceded by: Elijah Paine
- Succeeded by: Stephen Jacob

Member of the Vermont House of Representatives from Westminster
- In office 1808–1809
- Preceded by: William Czar Bradley
- Succeeded by: Eleazer May
- In office 1791–1793
- Preceded by: Stephen R. Bradley
- Succeeded by: Eliakim Spooner
- In office 1789–1790
- Preceded by: Stephen R. Bradley
- Succeeded by: Stephen R. Bradley

Personal details
- Born: April 2, 1757 Yarmouth, Province of Massachusetts Bay
- Died: May 17, 1809 (aged 52) Westminster, Vermont, U.S.
- Resting place: Old Westminster Cemetery, Westminster, Vermont
- Party: Federalist
- Spouse: Mary Homer (m. 1786–1809, his death)
- Children: 4
- Profession: Attorney

Military service
- Allegiance: United States
- Service: Continental Navy
- Years of service: 1776–1778
- Rank: Lieutenant
- Unit: USS Eagle
- Commands: HMS Spears (Prize of War)
- Wars: American Revolution

Lot Hall (April 2, 1757 – May 17, 1809) was a Vermont attorney, politician, and judge. A veteran of the American Revolution, Hall served as a justice of the Vermont Supreme Court from 1794 to 1800. His name sometimes appears in written records as "Lott Hall".

== Early life ==
Lot Hall was born in Yarmouth, Massachusetts on April 2, 1757. He received his early education in Barnstable County, Massachusetts, though the exact circumstances are unknown. He identified with the Patriot cause at the start of the American Revolution, and in May 1776 he enlisted in the United States Navy. Hall was a member of a force raised in New England by Captain Robert Cochran and Lieutenant Elijah Freeman Payne for the defense of the South Carolina coast; promised a lieutenant's commission if he recruited 15 others, Hall enlisted 30.

== American Revolution ==
In June, Payne and Hall procured a ship, the Eagle, and supplies in Connecticut and started to sail for Charleston, South Carolina. They encountered and captured three British ships, which members of their crew sailed to Boston as prizes. Payne and Hall subsequently captured a fourth British ship; they intended for Hall to command it and sail in tandem with Payne while Payne continued to command the Eagle. The two ships were separated by weather, and the British prisoners on Hall's prize overpowered Hall's crew and re-took the ship. Hall was a prisoner in Glasgow until April 1777, when he was exchanged for the commander of one of the ships Payne and he had previously captured. He sailed for America, and was captured again when the ship on which he was traveling was seized by the British near Cape Henry, Virginia. Hall was exchanged 10 days later, after which he made his way home to Massachusetts, where he arrived in February 1778.

After the war, Hall spent many years attempting to obtain the pay and benefits to which he was entitled for his wartime service; after his death, the United States Congress voted to award his descendants a portion of what Hall had sought.

== Post-Revolution ==
Upon returning to Massachusetts, Hall began to study law with Shearjashub Bourne; he was admitted to the bar in 1782, and relocated to Westminster, Vermont. In addition to practicing law, he quickly became involved in the government of the Vermont Republic, including service as acting secretary for the proceedings of Governor Thomas Chittenden and Chittenden's Governor's Council. Among the prospective attorneys who studied law under Hall was Dudley Chase, who served as chief justice of the Vermont Supreme Court and a United States senator.

== Continued career ==
Hall continued his involvement in Vermont's government after statehood in 1791. He represented Westminster in the Vermont House of Representatives from 1789 to 1790, 1791 to 1793, and 1808 to 1809. In 1792 he was one of Vermont's presidential electors, and cast his ballot for the ticket of George Washington and John Adams. In 1799, Hall was named to the state Council of Censors, the body which met every seven years to review the actions of the Governor and Council and the House of Representatives to ensure their constitutionality.

In 1794, Hall was appointed as a justice of the Vermont Supreme Court, and he served until 1800.

== Death and burial ==
While attending the 1808 session of the Vermont House, Hall suffered an attack of cattarh; the infection proved fatal, and he died in Westminster on May 17, 1809. Hall was buried at Old Westminster Cemetery.

== Family ==
In 1786, Hall married Mary Homer, a fifteen year old orphan then residing in Boston. Their children who lived to adulthood included Daniel, Mary, Benjamin, and Timothy.

== Sources ==
- Hall, Benjamin Homer (1858). History of Eastern Vermont: From Its Earliest Settlement to the Close of the Eighteenth Century. New York, NY: D. Appleton & Co. p. 658.
- Hall, David B. (1883). The Halls of New England: Genealogical and Biographical. Albany, NY: Joel Munsell's Sons.
- Hemenway, Abby Maria (1871). The Vermont Historical Gazetteer. Vol. 2. Burlington, VT: A. M. Hemenway.
- Tyler, Royall (1809). Reports of Cases Argued and Determined in the Supreme Court of the State of Vermont. Vol. 1. New York, NY: I. Riley.
