= East Clarendon station =

- East Clarendon Railroad Station
- U.S. National Register of Historic Places
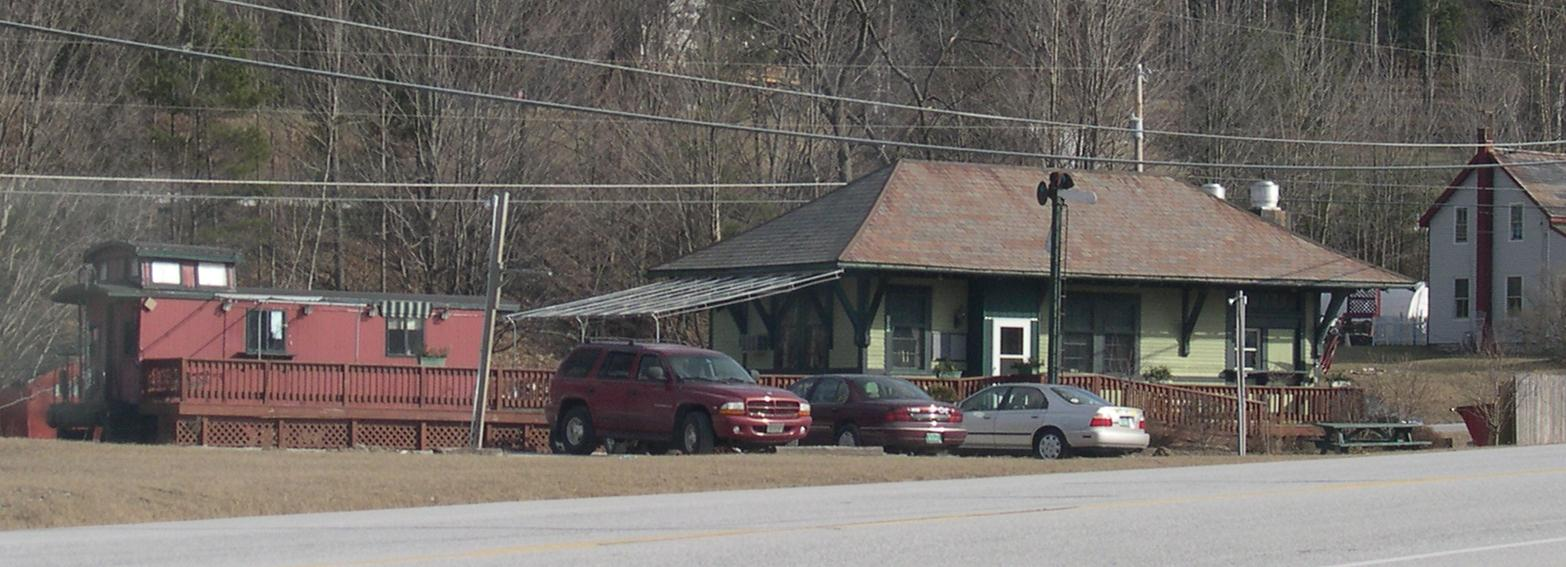

- Location within Vermont Location within the United States
- Location: 212 VT 103, Clarendon, Vermont
- Coordinates: 43°31′34″N 72°56′0″W
- Area: 0.5 acres (0.20 ha)
- Built: 1916
- Architect: Rutland Railroad
- Architectural style: Late Victorian
- NRHP reference No.: 99000262
- Added to NRHP: March 08, 1999

The East Clarendon Railroad Station is a historic railroad station at 212 Vermont Route 103 in Clarendon, Vermont. Built in 1916 by the Rutland Railroad and in service for 35 years, it is a well-preserved reminder of the importance of the railroad through the area. It was listed on the National Register of Historic Places in 1999. It presently houses a restaurant.

== Description and history ==
The former East Clarendon Railroad Station stands in central eastern Clarendon, at the triangular junction of Route 103 and East Clarendon Road. The latter road roughly parallels the tracks of the Rutland Railroad, an active freight line. The station originally stood between the road and the tracks, about 400 feet (120 m) southeast of its present location, to which it was moved in 1953. It is a single-story wood frame structure, with a broad hip roof that provides large overhangs, supported by triangular knee brackets. Its exterior is finished with a combination of wooden clapboards and bead boarding. The former agent's office is a small projection on the east side of the building. The interior retains its original three-room configuration, with a waiting room (now dining room), agent's office (now the lunch counter), and the freight room (kitchen). Interior finishes are either restored originals, or have been covered over to preserve them.

The rail line passing through East Clarendon was built in 1849, and is one of Vermont's oldest. This station was built about 1916 to provide passenger and freight service to the community, and was in service until 1953. Traffic on the line was stopped entirely in 1963, but has since been revived. The station was relocated to this site from its original location in after it was closed, but was not mounted on a permanent foundation until 1996, when it was given a major restoration and restaurant conversion.

== See also ==
- National Register of Historic Places listings in Rutland County, Vermont
