= Amos Marsh (politician) =

American politician

Amos Marsh (September 8, 1764 – January 4, 1811) was an American lawyer and politician who served as Speaker of the Vermont House of Representatives.

== Biography ==
Amos Marsh was born in New Milford, Connecticut on September 8, 1764. He graduated from the College of New Jersey (now Princeton University) in 1786, studied law and became an attorney in Vergennes, Vermont. In 1789 he received an honorary master's degree from Dartmouth College.

A Federalist, Marsh was elected to the Vermont House of Representatives in 1797, 1799 to 1802 and 1803 to 1804. He was Speaker from 1799 to 1802. He was an unsuccessful candidate for Congress in 1802.

From 1794 to 1796 Marsh served as United States Attorney for Vermont, succeeding Stephen Jacob. He was succeeded by Charles Marsh.

Marsh served as mayor of Vergennes from 1807 to 1810.

Marsh died in Saratoga Springs, New York on January 4, 1811. He was buried at Vergennes Burying Ground in Vergennes.

== Family ==
In 1789, March married Abigail Sutton (died 1814), who was originally from Canaan, Connecticut. They were the parents of two daughters, Laura (born 1792), the wife of Daniel Merwin, and Almira (born 1794), the wife of Anan Hine.

Political offices
Preceded by Daniel Farrand	Speaker of the Vermont House of Representatives; 1799–1802	Succeeded by Abel Spencer
Legal offices
Preceded by Stephen Jacob	United States Attorney for the District of Vermont; 1794–1796	Succeeded by Charles Marsh
