= Center Rutland, Vermont =

- Village
- Location within Vermont
- Coordinates: 43°36′16″N 73°00′41″W
- Country: United States
- State: Vermont
- County: Rutland
- Elevation: 518 ft (158 m)
- Time zone: UTC-5 (Eastern (EST))
  - Summer (DST): UTC-4 (EDT)
- ZIP code: 05736
- Area code: 802
- GNIS feature ID: 1456822

Center Rutland is an unincorporated village in the town of Rutland, Rutland County, Vermont, United States. The community is located along U.S. Route 4 Business and Vermont Route 3 on the western border of the city of Rutland. Center Rutland had a post office from May 1, 1850, until

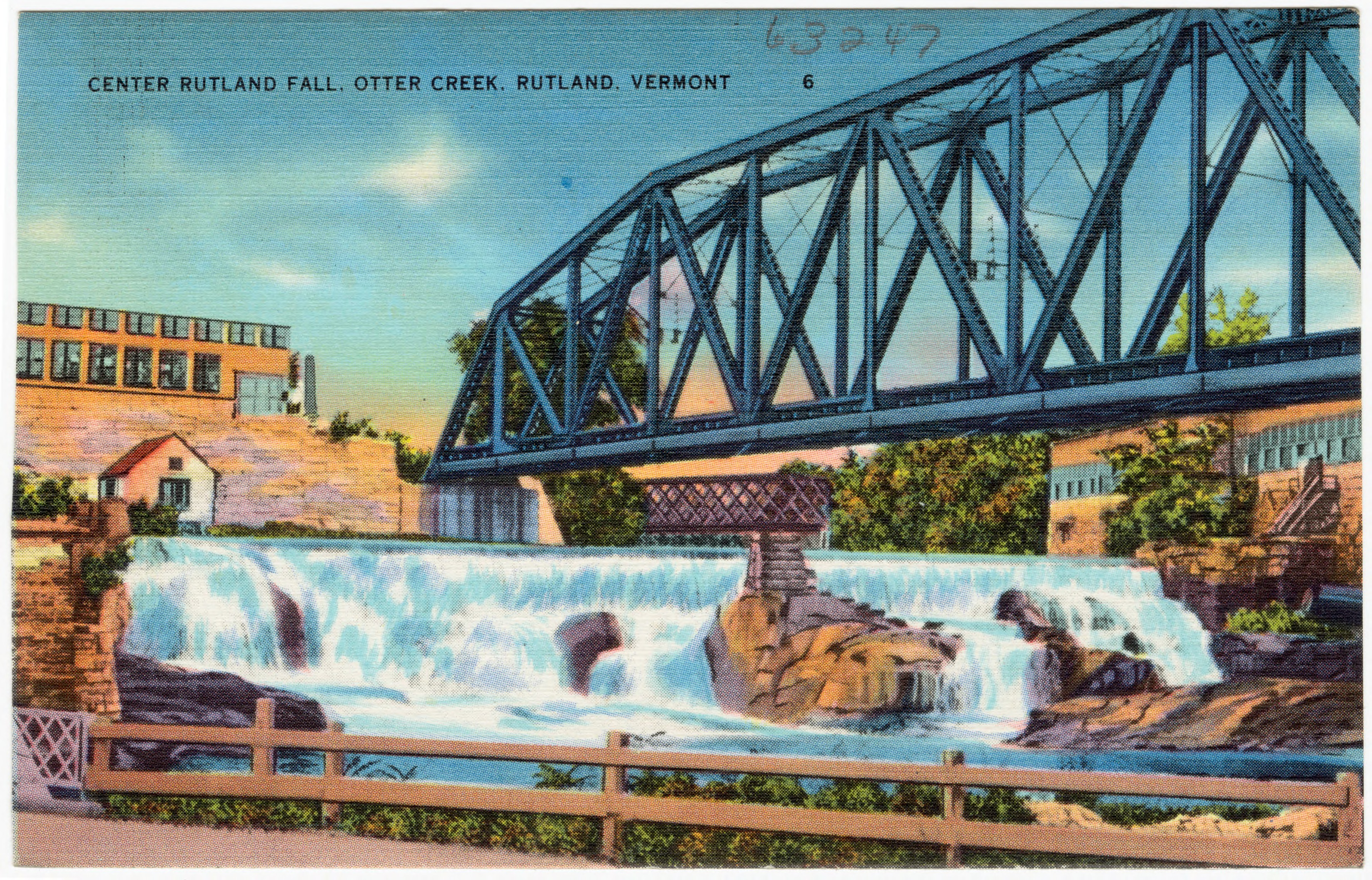
Center Rutland Fall, Otter Creek

March 19, 2011; it still has its own ZIP code, 05736.
