= Clarendon House (Clarendon Springs, Vermont) =

- U.S. National Register of Historic Places
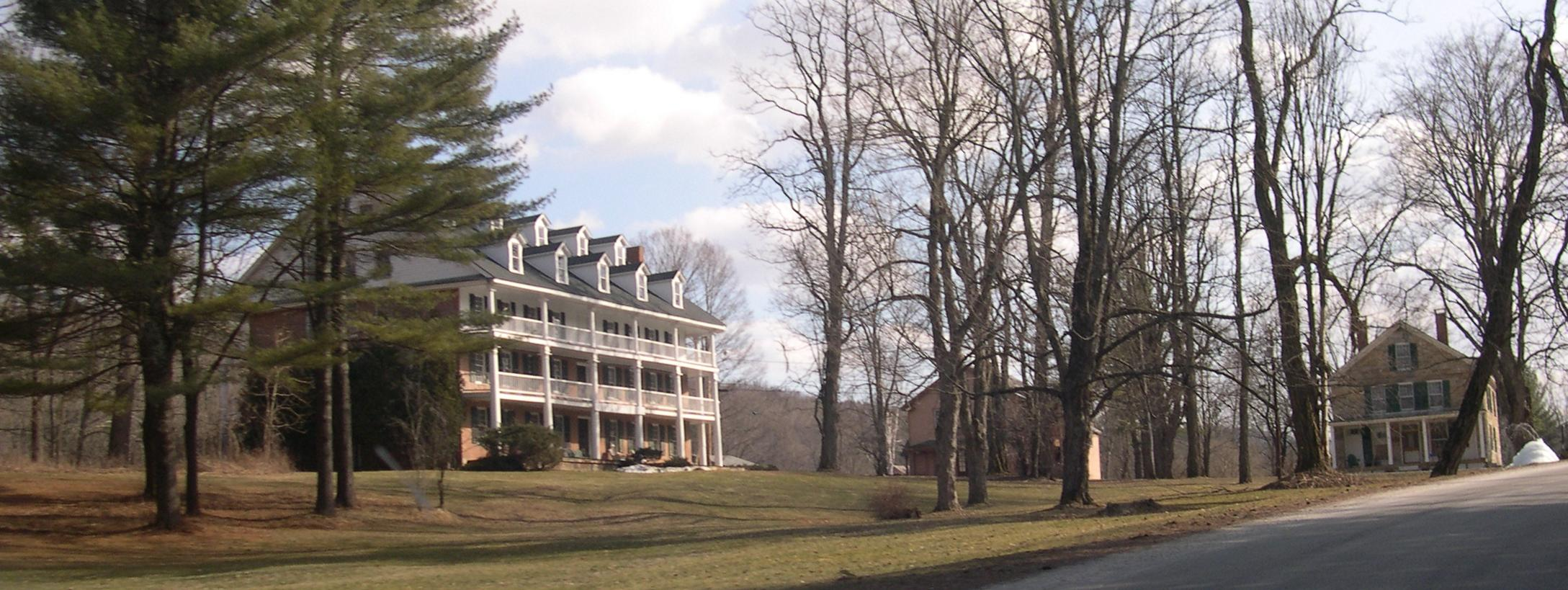

- Location within Vermont Location within the United States
- Location: Clarendon Springs Ln., Clarendon, Vermont
- Coordinates: 43°32′55″N 73°1′18″W
- Area: 12 acres (4.9 ha)
- Built: 1835
- NRHP reference No.: 76000146
- Added to NRHP: May 17, 1976

The Clarendon House is a historic former hotel building on Clarendon Springs Lane in Clarendon, Vermont. Built about 1835 and enlarged in the 1850s, it is one of Vermont's finest examples of pre-Civil War resort architecture, and a rare little-altered survivor of that period. The building was listed on the National Register of Historic Places in 1976. It and adjacent buildings are (as of 2015) vacant and for sale.

== Description and history ==
The Clarendon House stands in a rural area of northwestern Clarendon, on the west bank of the Clarendon River. It is set on the east side of Walker Mountain Road in the cluster of buildings that make up the rural village of Clarendon Springs. It is a large three-story brick structure that is nine bays wide and five deep, with a gabled roof pierced by two rows of gabled dormers on one side, and a single row on the other. The gable ends, and portions of the third floor, are framed in wood and finished in clapboards. The building's defining feature is a three-story porch, which extends around three of its sides, supported by Doric columns.

Built about 1835, the Clarendon House is one of the oldest surviving mineral spring resort hotels in the northeastern United States. Originally built as a two-story structure, and enlarged in the 1850s, it resembled a combination of a typical stagecoach hotel and high-class hotel accommodations of the early 19th century, as exemplified by Boston's Tremont House. The local mineral springs had been known since the 18th century for their restorative powers, and Thomas McLaughlin built this hotel about 1835 to capitalize on the business it brought. Its business, spurred by railroad construction through the area, was principally from southern states, and was consequently ruined by the American Civil War. After the war, business resumed under new ownership, but failed due to changing tastes and its inability to compete with other resorts offering a wider area of activities. In the 20th century the building has at times house a variety of businesses, including a restaurant and an antiques business. It has been used as an antique business since 1973 & still operates to this day.

== See also ==
- National Register of Historic Places listings in Rutland County, Vermont
