= North Clarendon, Vermont =

Census-designated place in Vermont, United States

- Census-designated place
- Location within Vermont Location within the United States
- Coordinates: 43°34′00″N 72°57′55″W
- Country: United States
- State: Vermont
- County: Rutland
- Towns: Clarendon; Rutland

Area
  - Total: 1.34 sq mi (3.46 km^{2})
  - Land: 1.33 sq mi (3.45 km^{2})
  - Water: 0.0039 sq mi (0.01 km^{2})
- Elevation: 591 ft (180 m)
- Time zone: UTC-5 (Eastern (EST))
  - Summer (DST): UTC-4 (EDT)
- ZIP Codes: 05759 (North Clarendon); 05701 (Rutland)
- Area code: 802
- GNIS feature ID: 1458721

North Clarendon is an unincorporated village in the town of Clarendon, Rutland County, Vermont, United States. It is part of the North Clarendon Census Designated Place, which extends north along U.S. Route 7 into the town of Rutland. The village is located south of the Cold River, 3 miles (5 km) south of Rutland city. As of the 2020 census, North Clarendon had a population of 395. North Clarendon has a post office with ZIP code 05759.
