= James Marsh (philosopher) =

American philosopher (1794–1842)

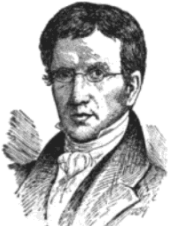

President of the University of Vermont
- In office 1826–1833

Personal details
- Born: July 19, 1794 Hartford, Vermont
- Died: July 3, 1842 (aged 47) Burlington, Vermont
- Education: Dartmouth College; Andover Theological Seminary
- Occupation: Philosopher, clergyman, educator

James Marsh (July 19, 1794 – July 3, 1842) was an American philosopher, Congregational clergyman and president of the University of Vermont from 1826 to 1833. He introduced German idealism to American audiences.

== Biography ==
Marsh was born in Hartford, Vermont, and educated at Dartmouth College, graduating in 1817 from the college-in-exile in opposition to Dartmouth University, the state university that was set up in an attempt to destroy the Dartmouth College. He then graduated from Andover Theological Seminary in 1822, meanwhile serving as tutor at Dartmouth 1818–1820, and spending several months in study at Cambridge, Massachusetts. In October 1824, he was ordained as a Congregational clergyman at Hanover, New Hampshire; then was a professor of languages and biblical literature at Hampden–Sydney College (Virginia) until 1826. It was surprising that one of Transcendentalists was in Hampden-Sydney College. President Jonathan P. Cushing was a classmate at Dartmouth College with Marsh. But he was interested in interpretations of language.

He built a philosophy based on the works of Samuel Taylor Coleridge. "German idealism was initially introduced to the broader community of American literati through a Vermont intellectual, James Marsh. Studying theology with Moses Stuart at Andover Seminary in the early 1820s, Marsh sought a Christian theology that would 'keep alive the heart in the head.' "

As president of the University of Vermont, Marsh instituted a program of a unified study where all seniors took a course in philosophy that sought to create a centralized model of knowledge. He introduced a less severe discipline among the students. He then resigned the presidency to become professor of moral and intellectual philosophy, where he served until his death. His philosophy would influence student William A. Wheeler, who in the future would become Vice President of the United States.

James Marsh died in Burlington, Vermont on July 3, 1842.

He was a cousin of George Perkins Marsh, a representative of U.S. Congress, and nephew of Vermont lawyer and representative of U.S. Congress Charles Marsh.

== Writings ==
His literary work was quite large, and he was among the first to revive by his writings the scholastic dogma of "Crede ut intelligas," in opposition to that of "Intellige ut credas." In 1829 he contributed a series of papers on "Popular Education" to the Vermont Chronicle, under the pen name of "Philopolis", and he published a "Preliminary Essay" to Coleridge's Aids to Reflection (Burlington, 1829), and Selections from the Old English Writers on Practical Theology (1830). Besides these he issued several translations from the German, including Johann Gottfried Herder's Spirit of Hebrew Poetry (1833). His literary remains were collected and published, with a memoir of their author, by Joseph Torrey (1843).

== Sources ==
- Louis Menand. The Metaphysical Club: A Story of Ideas in America. (New York: Farrar, Straus and Giroux, 2001) p. 238-250. ISBN 0-374-52849-7
- Article on Marsh and transcendentalism
