= Wheelock Law Office =

- U.S. National Register of Historic Places
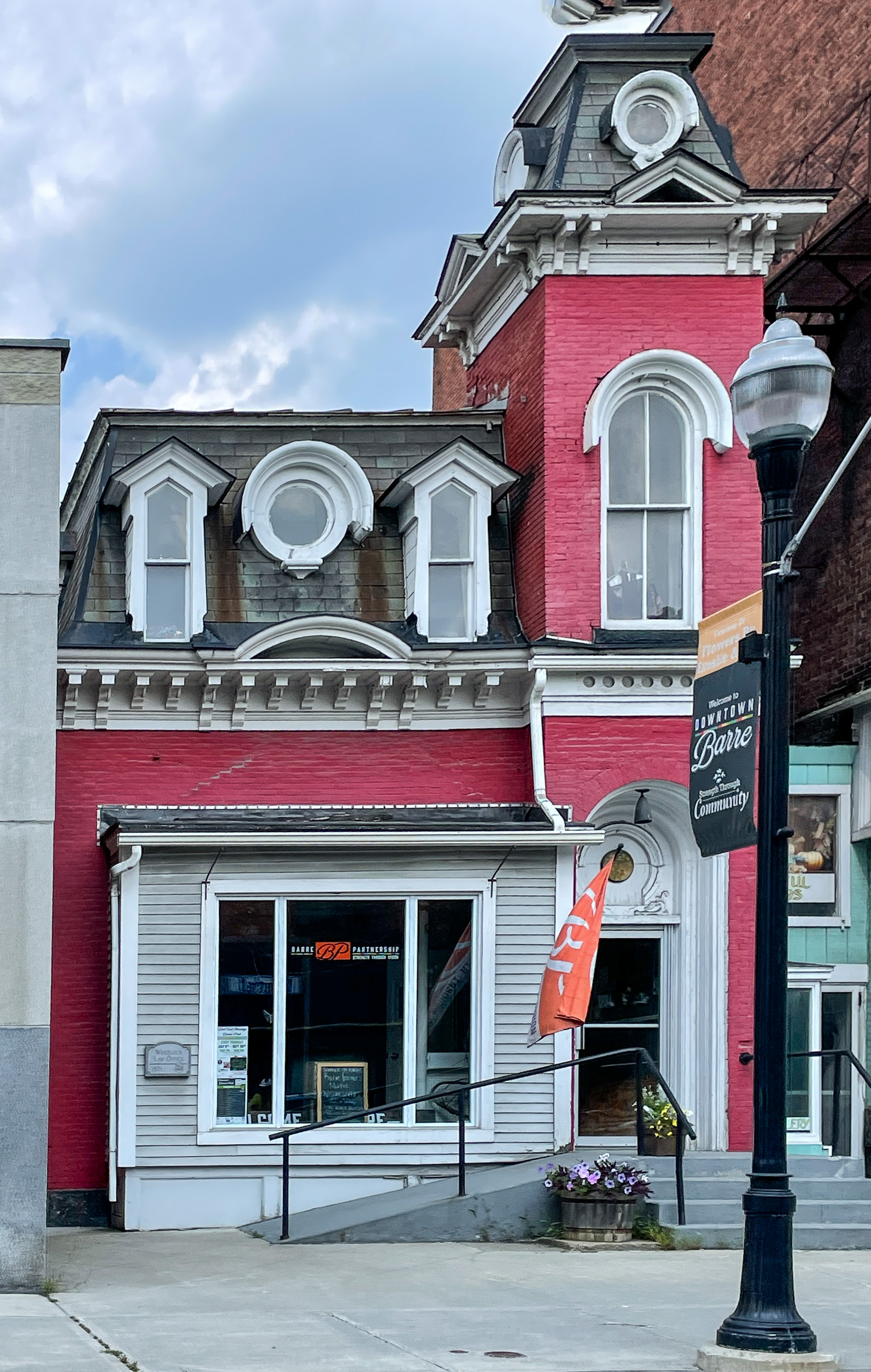
- Wheelock Law Office was home to the "Barre Partnership" from 2019 to 2023

- Location within Vermont Location within the United States
- Location: 135 N. Main St., Barre, Vermont
- Coordinates: 44°11′53″N 72°30′13″W
- Area: 1 acre (0.40 ha)
- Built: 1871
- Architectural style: Second Empire
- NRHP reference No.: 75000148
- Added to NRHP: June 18, 1975

The Wheelock Law Office is a historic commercial building at 135 North Main Street in the city of Barre, Vermont. Built in 1871 for a prominent local lawyer, it is a fine example of Second Empire architecture, and a rare surviving domestically scaled building in an area now primarily filled with larger commercial buildings. It was listed on the National Register of Historic Places in 1975.

== Description and history ==
The Wheelock Law Office building stands in the central business district of Barre, on the north side of North Main Street between Keith Avenue and Pearl Street. It is sandwiched on a narrow lot between a 20th-century single-story commercial block and a three-story late 19th-century commercial building. It is a 1-1/2 story brick building, with a bell cast mansard roof providing a full second story. The right side of the front consists of a 2-1/2 story tower, with the building entrance at the base in a round-arch opening. A round-arch window is set above it in the second story, and the tower is capped by a bell cast roof with oculus window dormers. The left side of the front has a large display window on the first floor, and gabled dormers flanking an oculus window dormer in the steep portion of the mansard. A modern single-story addition projects to the rear. The interior of the building retains no historic elements, having been repeatedly remodeled for varying commercial uses.

The building was erected in 1871 for Langdon Wheelock, then one of the city's leading attorneys. The area was at the time a tree-lined residential street, with Wheelock's house, a Federal period brick building demolished in 1946, located next door. Since Wheelock's death in 1873, the building has seen a variety of commercial uses, including as a bank and a senior center. It is a rare reminder of the once-domestic scale of the surrounding streetscape.

The Granite Savings Bank and Trust Company was located in the building for over fifty years, starting in April 1885. In 1920 the building was renovated.

The building was later owned by the City of Barre. In 2019 the building became home to a welcome center operated by the Barre Partnership. The Barre Partnership is Barre's officially designated community revitalization community organization.

The city sold the building in 2023 to a restaurant and community store, which promised to preserve the historic nature of the building.

== See also ==
- Charles Marsh Law Office: NRHP listing in Woodstock (village), Vermont
- National Register of Historic Places listings in Washington County, Vermont
