= Russell de Gree Flagg =

Russell de Gree Flagg (1892-ca.1980, fl. 1905-ca.1975) was an American luthier. Grandson of Essex County, New York, violin maker Henry Lewis Flagg, Russell de Gree Flag studied violin making with Charles Eastbrook. Flagg's violins and violas were mostly patterned after Stradivarius, although he did produce instruments patterned after Guarneri and Amati as well. Flagg used commercial oil varnish, typically orange-red or red-brown in hue. A resident of Rutland, VT, he began to use old wood recovered from local covered bridges beginning in 1933 . Having produced 150 violins and 15 violas by 1940, he ultimately produced over 200 violins and approximately 70 violas in addition to much repair work.
