= Charles Marsh (American politician) =

American politician

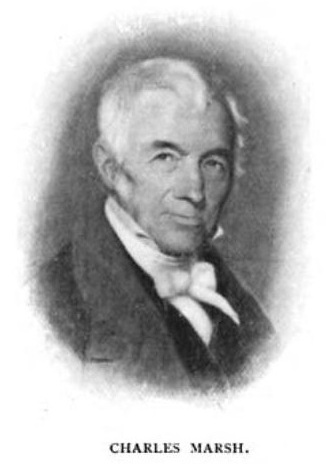

Member of the U.S. House of Representatives from Vermont's at-large district
- In office March 4, 1815 – March 3, 1817
- Preceded by: Richard Skinner
- Succeeded by: Samuel C. Crafts

United States Attorney for the District of Vermont
- In office 1797–1801
- President: John Adams
- Preceded by: Amos Marsh
- Succeeded by: David Fay

Personal details
- Born: July 10, 1765 Lebanon, Connecticut Colony, British America
- Died: January 11, 1849 (aged 83) Woodstock, Vermont, U.S.
- Party: Federalist
- Spouse: Anna Collins (m. 1789; died 1798) Susan Perkins (m. 1798)
- Children: 7, including George
- Education: Dartmouth College
- Profession: Attorney

Charles Marsh (July 10, 1765 – January 11, 1849) was an American politician from Vermont. He served as a member of the United States House of Representatives.

== Biography ==
Marsh was born in Lebanon, Connecticut Colony, to Joseph Marsh and Dorothy Mason. He and his parents settled in Vermont before the Revolutionary War. After graduating from Dartmouth College in 1786, he studied law and was admitted to the bar. He began practicing law in Woodstock, Vermont, where he continued his legal career for about fifty years. He became one of the most senior members of the legal profession in Vermont. Nicholas Baylies, who later served as a justice of the Vermont Supreme Court, was among those who studied in his office. He was appointed by George Washington to be the U.S. Attorney for the District of Vermont, and served from 1797 until 1801.

Marsh was elected to the Fourteenth United States Congress as a Federalist, serving from March 4, 1815, until March 3, 1817. He founded the American Colonization Society while in Washington.

He was prominent in the Dartmouth College controversy and was a trustee of Dartmouth College from 1809 until 1849. Marsh became a member of the American Board of Commissioners for Foreign Missions in 1809.

Marsh received the degree of LL.D. from Dartmouth College in 1828. He was a liberal benefactor of various missionary and Bible societies, president of the Vermont Bible Society, vice president of the American Bible Society, and vice president of the American Education Society.

== Family life ==
Marsh married Anna Collins in 1789. They had two children, Charles Marsh and Anna Marsh. Marsh married Susan Perkins on June 3, 1798. They had five children: Lyndon Arnold Marsh, George Perkins Marsh, Joseph Marsh, Sarah Marsh, and Charles Marsh.

Marsh's father, Joseph Marsh, was a Vermont officer in the American Revolution, a member of the Vermont House of Representatives, and the first Lieutenant Governor of Vermont. His son George Perkins Marsh (1801–1882) was an environmentalist, a member of the United States Congress, and a diplomat. His nephew James Marsh (1794–1842) was a noted Congregational clergyman and writer.

== Death ==
Marsh died on January 11, 1849, in Woodstock, Vermont.

His early 19th-century house, now significantly altered with Victorian features, is the centerpiece of Marsh-Billings-Rockefeller National Historical Park and is a National Historic Landmark (primarily for its association with his son George Perkins Marsh), and his c. 1797 law office building (now a private residence and moved from its original location) is listed on the National Register of Historic Places.

== Notes ==
Legal offices
| Preceded by Amos Marsh | United States Attorney for the District of Vermont; 1797-1801 | Succeeded by David Fay |
U.S. House of Representatives
| Preceded by Richard Skinner | Member of the U.S. House of Representatives from Vermont's at-large congressional district March 4, 1815 – March 3, 1817 | Succeeded by Samuel C. Crafts |
