= Clarendon, Vermont =

- Town
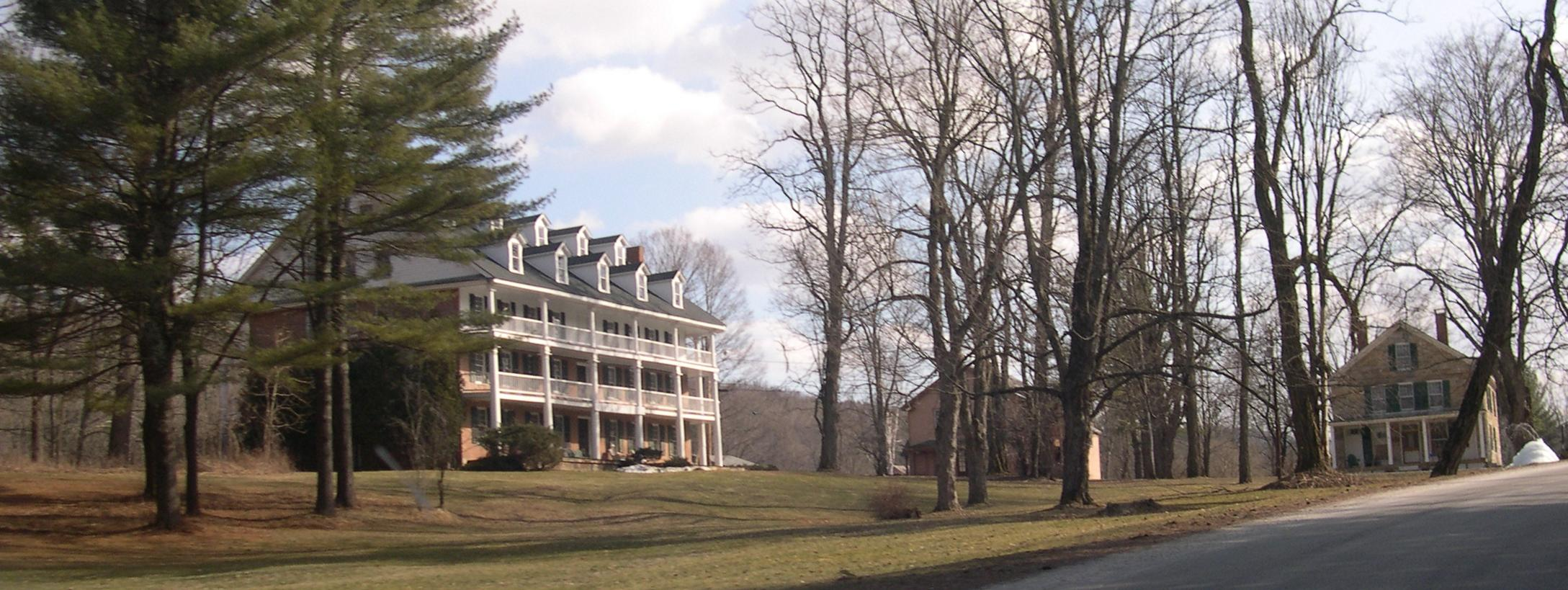
- Clarendon House, Clarendon Springs

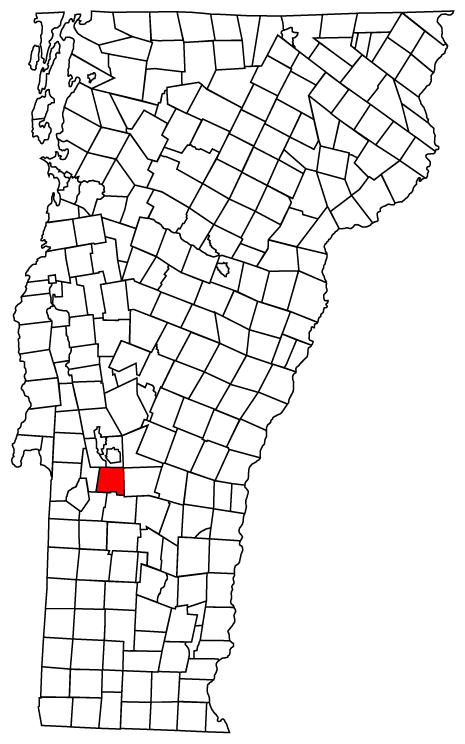
- Clarendon, Vermont
- Coordinates: 43°31′30″N 72°59′07″W
- Country: United States
- State: Vermont
- County: Rutland
- Communities: Clarendon; Chippenhook; Clarendon Springs; East Clarendon; North Clarendon

Area
  - Total: 31.5 sq mi (81.7 km^{2})
  - Land: 31.5 sq mi (81.7 km^{2})
  - Water: 0 sq mi (0.0 km^{2})
- Elevation: 617 ft (188 m)

Population (2020)
  - Total: 2,412
  - Density: 76.5/sq mi (29.5/km^{2})
- Time zone: UTC-5 (Eastern (EST))
  - Summer (DST): UTC-4 (EDT)
- ZIP Codes: 05759 (North Clarendon); 05777 (Clarendon Springs); 05773 (Wallingford)
- Area code: 802
- FIPS code: 50-14500
- GNIS feature ID: 1462072
- Website: https://www.clarendonvt.gov/

Clarendon is a town in Rutland County, Vermont, United States. The population was 2,412 at the 2020 census. Clarendon spans U.S. Route 7 and is split by the highway, the Cold River and Mill River, Otter Creek, and the Green Mountains into the hamlets of Clarendon, West Clarendon, East Clarendon, Clarendon Springs, and North Clarendon.

== History ==
The area that later formed the Town of Clarendon was settled by families from lower New England as early as 1762. It and the surrounding area was then part of Albany County, New York, but was later split off as Charlotte County until Vermont declared itself as a republic around 1777. Land claims by New Hampshire were eventually settled, and in 1791 Vermont became a state.

Clarendon now includes the following entries on the National Register of Historic Places:

- Brown Covered Bridge – bridges the Cold River on Cold River Road in North Clarendon. NOTE: The Brown Covered Bridge is actually on the Upper Cold River Road in Shrewsbury and was damaged during the flooding from Hurricane Irene (added February 21, 1974)
- Clarendon Congregational Church – Middle Rd. (added August 12, 1984)
- Clarendon House – off VT 133 in Clarendon Springs (added June 17, 1976)
  - The Clarendon House hotel was a spa resort destination in the early 20th century
- Cold River Bridge – VT 7B over the Cold R. (added December 14, 1991)
- East Clarendon Railroad Station – VT 103 and East Rd. (added April 8, 1999)
  - The former East Clarendon Railroad Station is a restaurant today
- Kingsley Covered Bridge – bridges the Mill River on East Street in East Clarendon (added March 12, 1974)
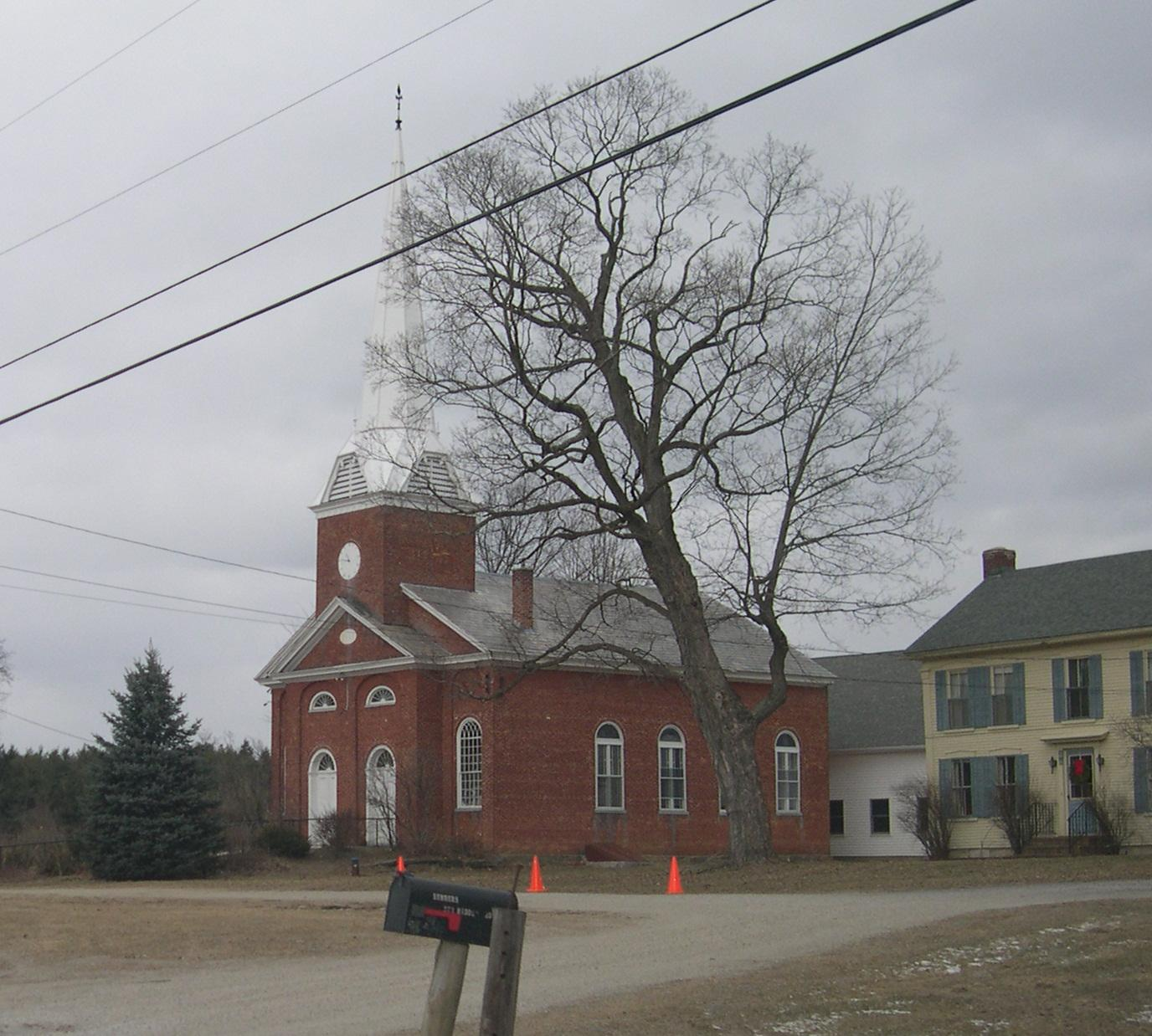
Clarendon Congregational Church

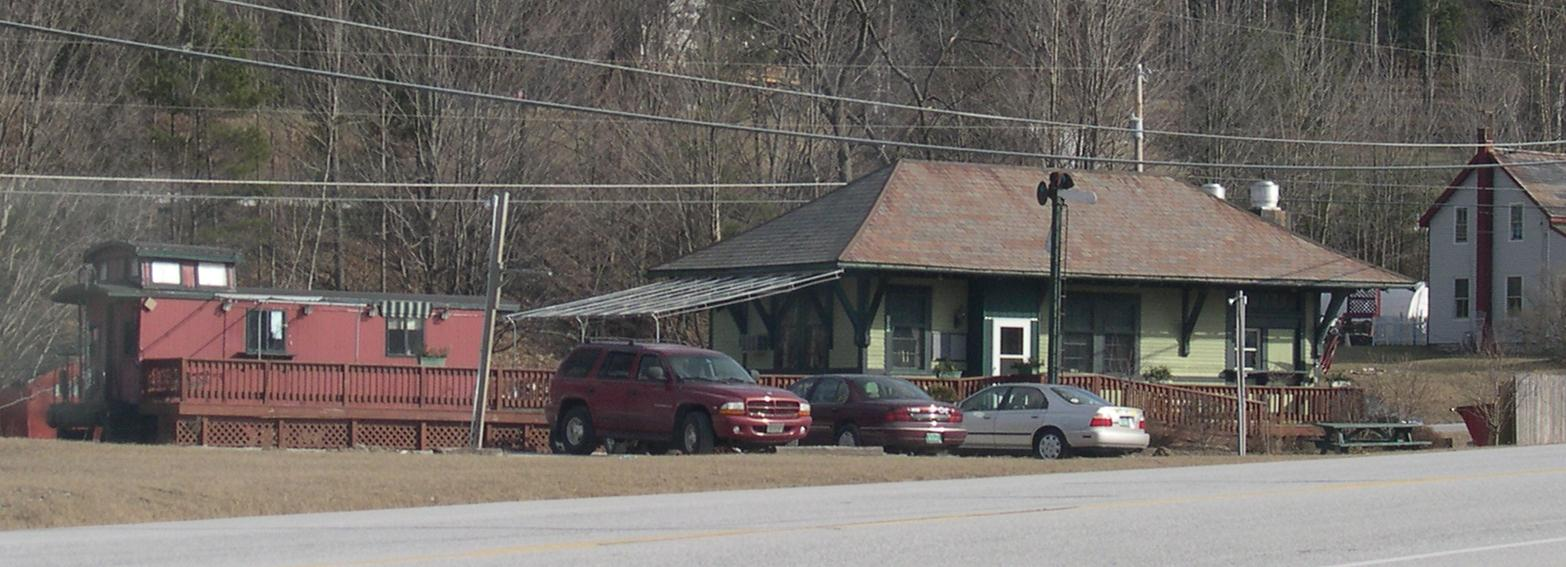
Former East Clarendon Railroad Station

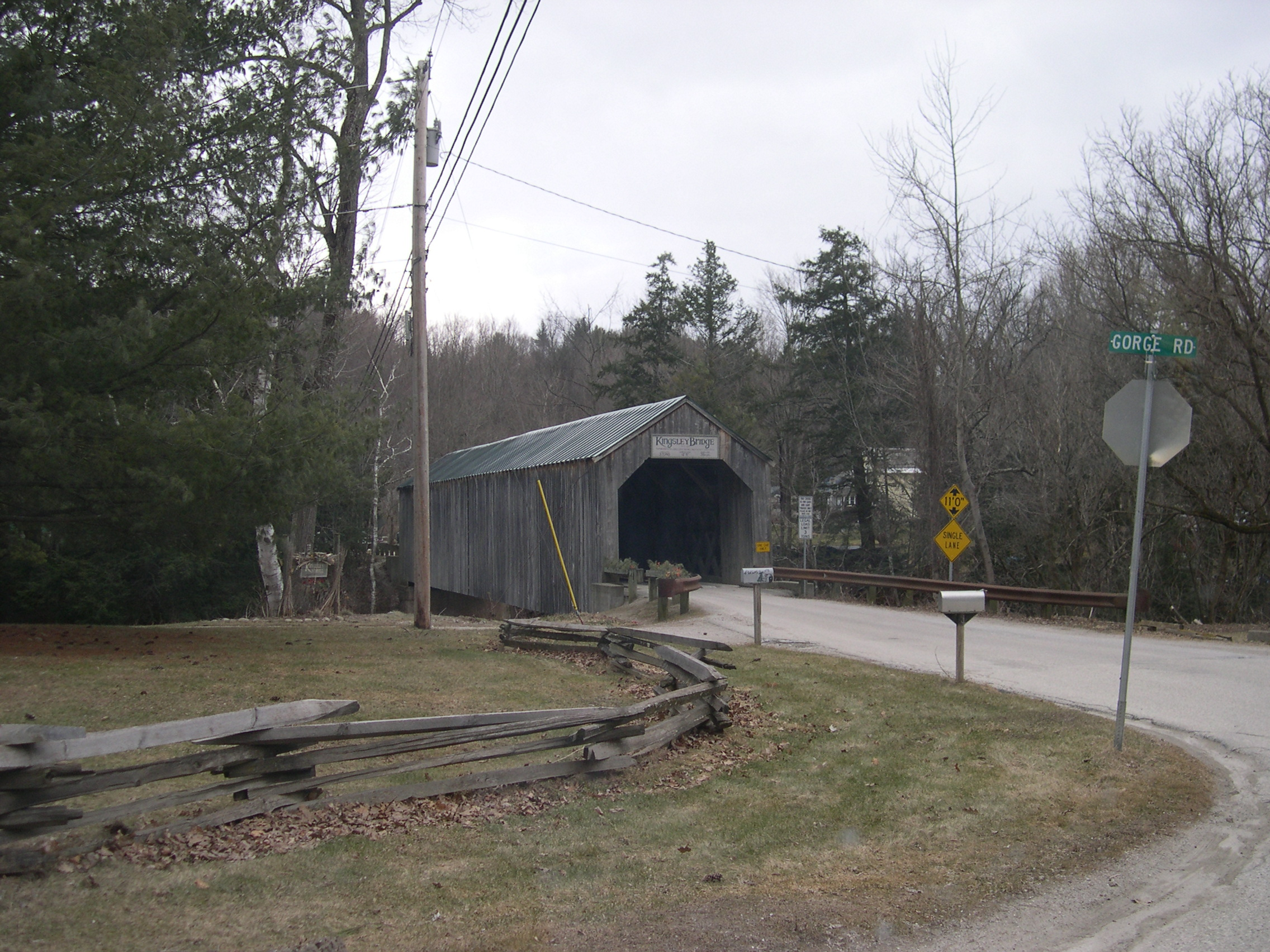
Kingsley Covered Bridge, East Clarendon

== Geography ==
According to the United States Census Bureau, the town has a total area of 31.6 square miles (81.7 km^{2}), all land.

The Clarendon Gorge, accessible using the combined Appalachian Trail/Long Trail, is a popular local geographical feature. One must cross a 30-foot-long (9.1 m) suspension bridge to reach the waterfall and swimming holes as well as to connect with the Appalachian Trail National Scenic Trail.

Clarendon Gorge (Upper Falls):

- Height: 8-foot (2.4 m) total drop
- Water Source: Mill River
- Trail Length: .01 mile
- Trail Difficulty: Easy

== Education ==
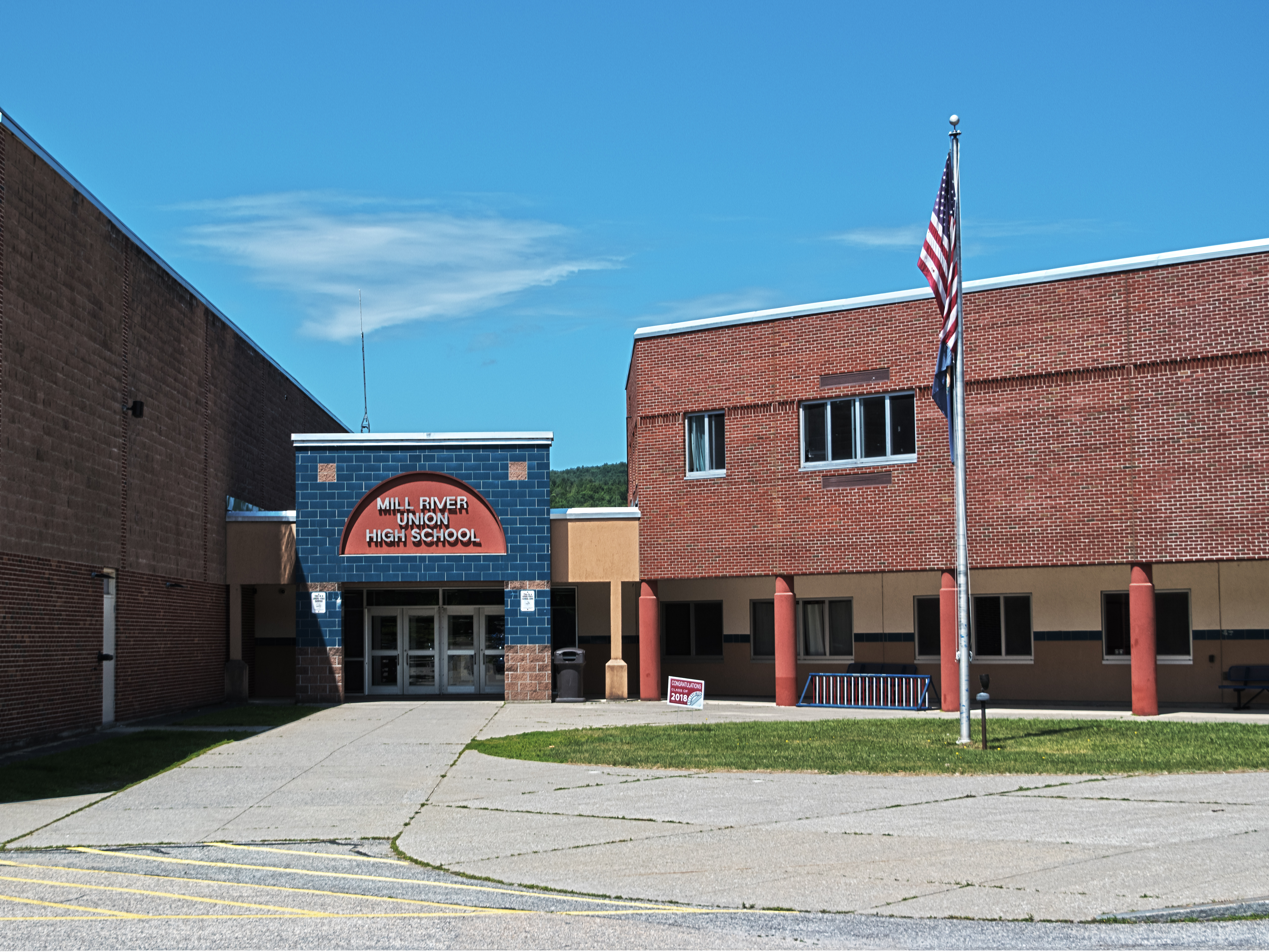
Mill River Union High School

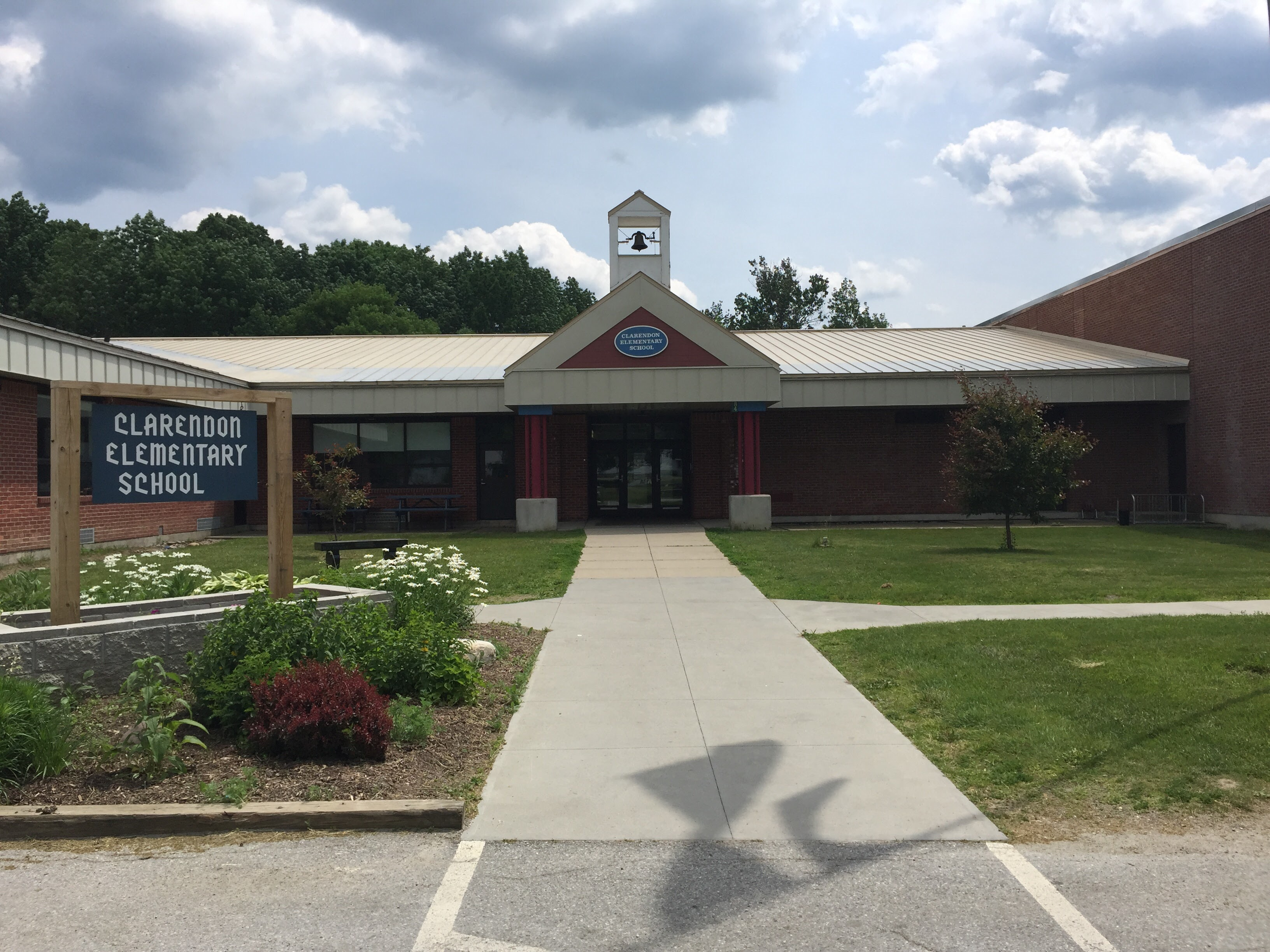
Clarendon Elementary School

The students of Clarendon are served by two schools. Clarendon Elementary School for students in Pre-K through 6th grade and Mill River Union High School for students in grades 7–12. Prior to 2016, both schools were a part of the Rutland South Supervisory Union, but merged via Act 153 into the Mill River Unified Union School District. As of 2015, 46% of Clarendon students attended Clarendon Elementary School and 54% attended Mill River Union High School.

== Demographics ==
Historical population
Census	Pop.	Note	%±
1790	1,478		—
1800	1,789		21.0%
1810	1,797		0.4%
1820	1,712		−4.7%
1830	1,585		−7.4%
1840	1,549		−2.3%
1850	1,477		−4.6%
1860	1,237		−16.2%
1870	1,173		−5.2%
1880	1,105		−5.8%
1890	928		−16.0%
1900	915		−1.4%
1910	857		−6.3%
1920	826		−3.6%
1930	883		6.9%
1940	868		−1.7%
1950	1,102		27.0%
1960	1,091		−1.0%
1970	1,537		40.9%
1980	2,372		54.3%
1990	2,835		19.5%
2000	2,811		−0.8%
2010	2,571		−8.5%
2020	2,412		−6.2%
U.S. Decennial Census

As of the census of 2000, there were 2,811 people, 1,136 households, and 784 families residing in the town. The population density was 89.1 people per square mile (34.4/km^{2}). There were 1,207 housing units at an average density of 38.3 per square mile (14.8/km^{2}). The racial makeup of the town was 98.08% White, 0.28% African American, 0.32% Native American, 0.57% Asian, 0.21% from other races, and 0.53% from two or more races. Hispanic or Latino of any race were 0.50% of the population.

There were 1,136 households, out of which 31.2% had children under the age of 18 living with them, 58.0% were married couples living together, 7.5% had a female householder with no husband present, and 30.9% were non-families. 24.0% of all households were made up of individuals, and 7.4% had someone living alone who was 65 years of age or older. The average household size was 2.47 and the average family size was 2.94.

In the town, the population was spread out, with 23.1% under the age of 18, 6.8% from 18 to 24, 27.7% from 25 to 44, 32.1% from 45 to 64, and 10.4% who were 65 years of age or older. The median age was 42 years. For every 100 females, there were 97.1 males. For every 100 females age 18 and over, there were 98.2 males.

The median income for a household in the town was $41,597, and the median income for a family was $48,534. Males had a median income of $31,122 versus $24,375 for females. The per capita income for the town was $19,801. About 5.4% of families and 7.7% of the population were below the poverty line, including 8.3% of those under age 18 and 12.7% of those age 65 or over

== Notable people ==
- Delino Dexter Calvin, Ontario, Canada businessman and politician
- Charles V. Dyer, Chicago abolitionist
- George F. Emmons, naval officer on voyage that explored the Antarctic
- Theophilus Harrington, Justice of the Vermont Supreme Court
- George Tisdale Hodges, United States Representative
- Silas H. Hodges, Commissioner of the U.S. Patent Office
- Harrison J. Peck, newspaper editor and member of the Minnesota Senate
- Increase Moseley, Speaker of the Vermont House of Representatives.
- Abel Spencer, Speaker of the Vermont House of Representatives
