= Cold River (Vermont) =

Location
- Country: United States
- State: Vermont
- Counties: Rutland
- Towns/Cities: Shrewsbury, Clarendon, Rutland (town)

Physical characteristics
- Source
  - location: Shrewsbury, Vermont
  - coordinates: 43.54164°N 72.81198°W
  - elevation: 2,120 ft (650 m)
- Mouth: Otter Creek
  - location: Rutland (town), Vermont
  - coordinates: 43.57312°N 72.98630°W
  - elevation: 530 ft (160 m)
- Length: 20.7 km (12.9 mi)

The Cold River is a 12.9-mile-long (20.8 km) tributary of Otter Creek in Rutland County, Vermont, in the United States.

The Cold River rises northeast of North Shrewsbury in the Coolidge Range, part of the Green Mountains. It flows southwest through North Shrewsbury, then turns northwest to the town line with Clarendon, where it turns west and flows through the village of North Clarendon. It reaches Otter Creek 1 mile (2 km) west of North Clarendon, just north of the Rutland town line.

The Cold River is crossed by the Appalachian Trail and by U.S. Route 7.

== See also ==
- List of rivers of Vermont
