= Theophilus Harrington =

American judge

Theophilus Harrington (also spelled Herrington or Herrinton) (March 27, 1762 – November 17, 1813) served as a justice of the Vermont Supreme Court and Speaker of the Vermont House of Representatives.

== Early life ==
Harrington was born in Coventry, Rhode Island on March 27, 1762. He served in both the Rhode Island Militia and Continental Army during the American Revolution. He moved to Shaftsbury, Vermont with his family in 1778. In 1788 he settled in Clarendon, Vermont, where he was a farmer, merchant and land speculator.

== Political career ==
After moving to Clarendon, Harrington became active in politics and government, serving in local offices including Selectman. He joined the Democratic-Republican Party, and was a member of the Vermont House of Representatives in 1795 and from 1797 to 1804. He was Speaker in his final term.

== Judicial career ==
In October, 1800 Harrington became Judge of the Rutland County Court, where he served until 1803. He served on the bench at a time when many judges were not lawyers. This circumstance resulted from distrust of attorneys in the post-Revolutionary War era, when most individuals with legal education had supported New York during its dispute with Vermont's original white settlers over the validity of their land titles.

In 1802 Harrington was admitted to the bar.

In October, 1803 Harrington was chosen as one of the Justices of the Vermont Supreme Court, where he served until 1813.

== Slave ownership case ==
Harrington is best known for a ruling he is supposed to have issued in the case of a runaway slave from New York.

In June 1804, the slave's owner sought to reclaim him. Harrington demanded proof that the claimant did indeed own the slave. The owner produced bills of sale for both the slave and the slave's mother. Judge Harrington said that the documents of title did not go far enough back in time. When the owner asked what proof of ownership the judge would accept, Judge Harrington replied, "Nothing short of a bill of sale signed by God Almighty Himself." Justices Royall Tyler and Jonathan Robinson concurred, and the slave was set free.

Their actions were considered by abolitionists as an expression of the Vermont Constitution's prohibition against slavery. The supposed quote from Harrington was engraved on a plaque which was installed in Westminster Abbey by British abolitionists.

Court decisions from that period were not recorded, so there is no way to ascertain the validity of the quote with certainty. The first evidence of it can be traced back to Benjamin Shaw's 1846 lecture "Illegality of Slavery."

== Death and burial ==
Harrington and the other Judges on the Supreme Court were replaced when Federalists came to power in 1813.

Theophilus Harrington died in Clarendon on November 17, 1813. He was buried at Chippenhook Cemetery in Clarendon (also known as West Clarendon Cemetery).

In 1886 the State of Vermont had a monument to Harrington installed at Chippenhook Cemetery.

Political offices
Preceded by Abel Spencer	Speaker of the Vermont House of Representatives; 1803 – 1804	Succeeded by Aaron Leland
