= Rutland (town), Vermont =

Rutland, Vermont
- Town
- Seal

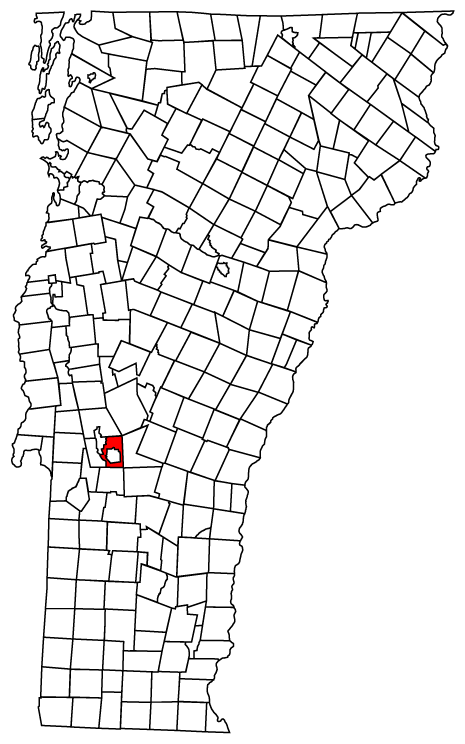
- Location in Vermont
- Coordinates: 43°37′38″N 72°58′59″W
- Country: United States
- State: Vermont
- County: Rutland
- Communities: Center Rutland; North Clarendon

Area
  - Total: 19.3 sq mi (50.0 km^{2})
  - Land: 19.2 sq mi (49.7 km^{2})
  - Water: 0.12 sq mi (0.3 km^{2})
- Elevation: 561 ft (171 m)

Population (2020)
  - Total: 3,924
  - Density: 204/sq mi (79.0/km^{2})
- Time zone: UTC-5 (Eastern (EST))
  - Summer (DST): UTC-4 (EDT)
- ZIP Codes: 05701 (Rutland); 05736 (Center Rutland); 05759 (North Clarendon)
- Area code: 802
- FIPS code: 50-61300
- GNIS feature ID: 1462193
- Website: www.rutlandtown.com

Rutland is a town in Rutland County, Vermont, United States. As of the 2020 census, the population was 3,924. Rutland Town completely surrounds Rutland City, which is a separate municipality. The villages of the town effectively comprise the inner suburbs of Rutland City.

== History ==
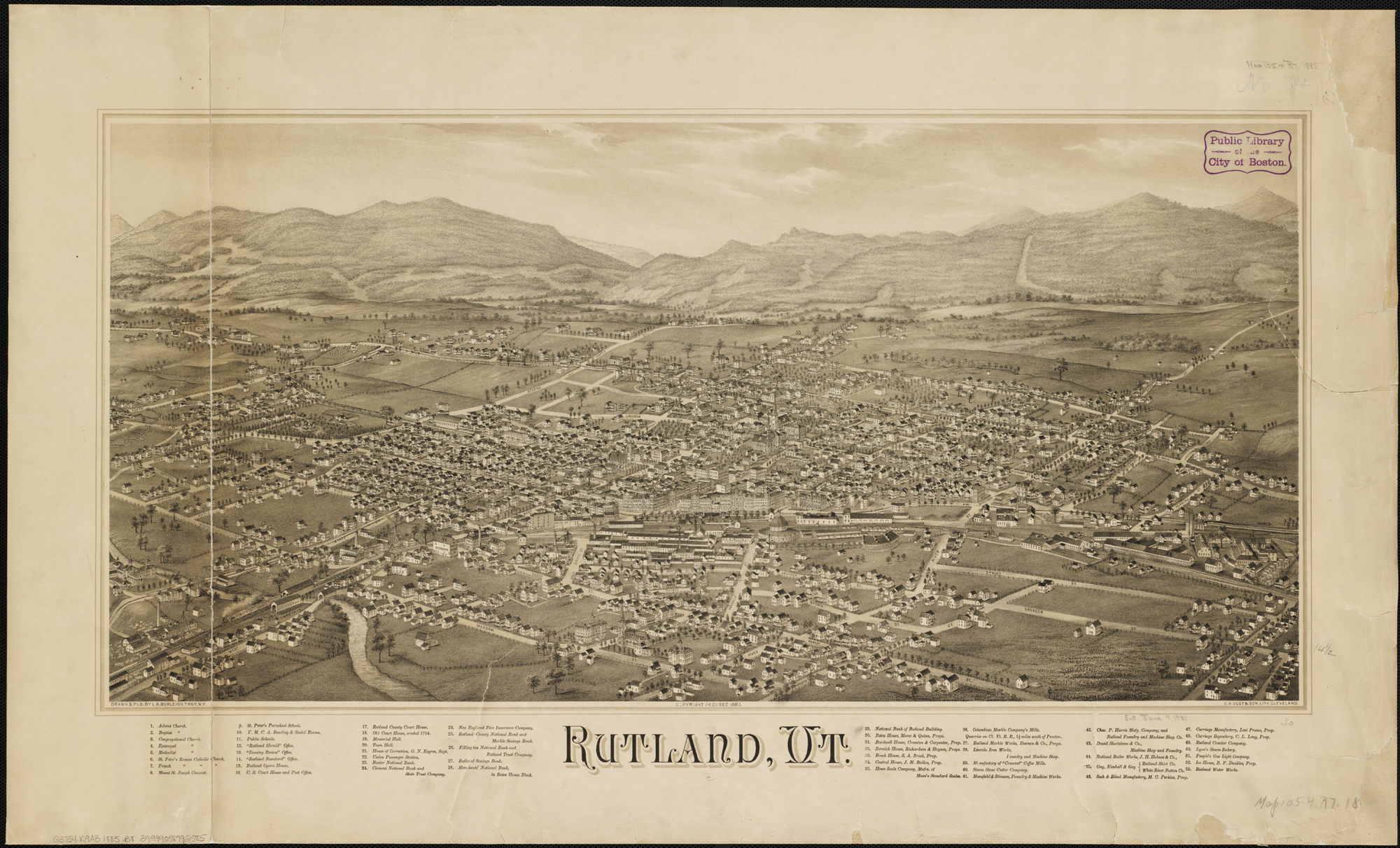
Lithograph of Rutland from 1885

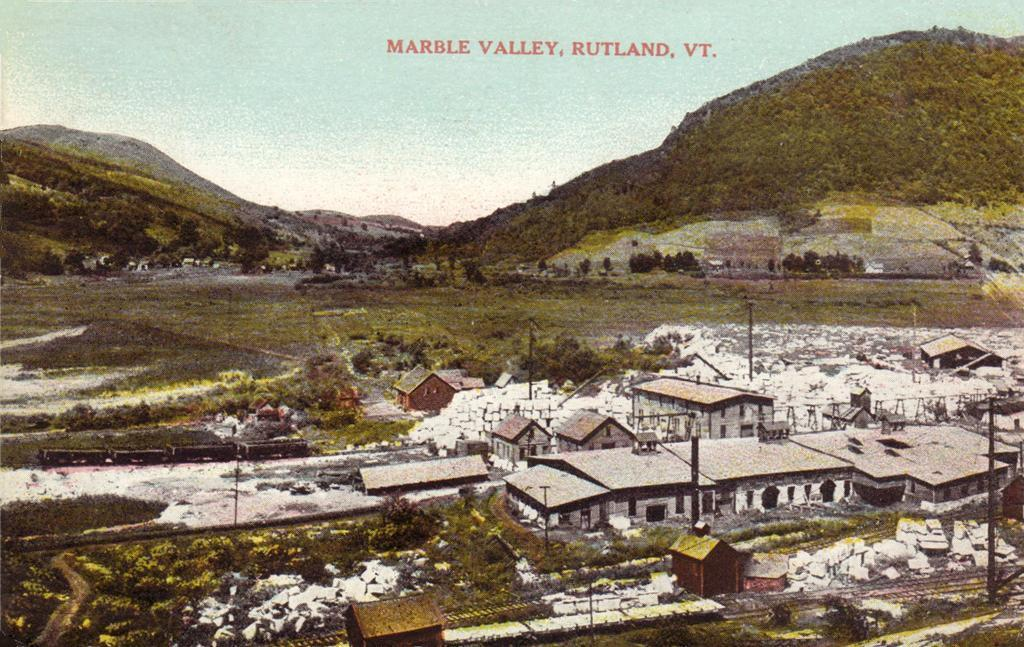
Marble Valley in 1911

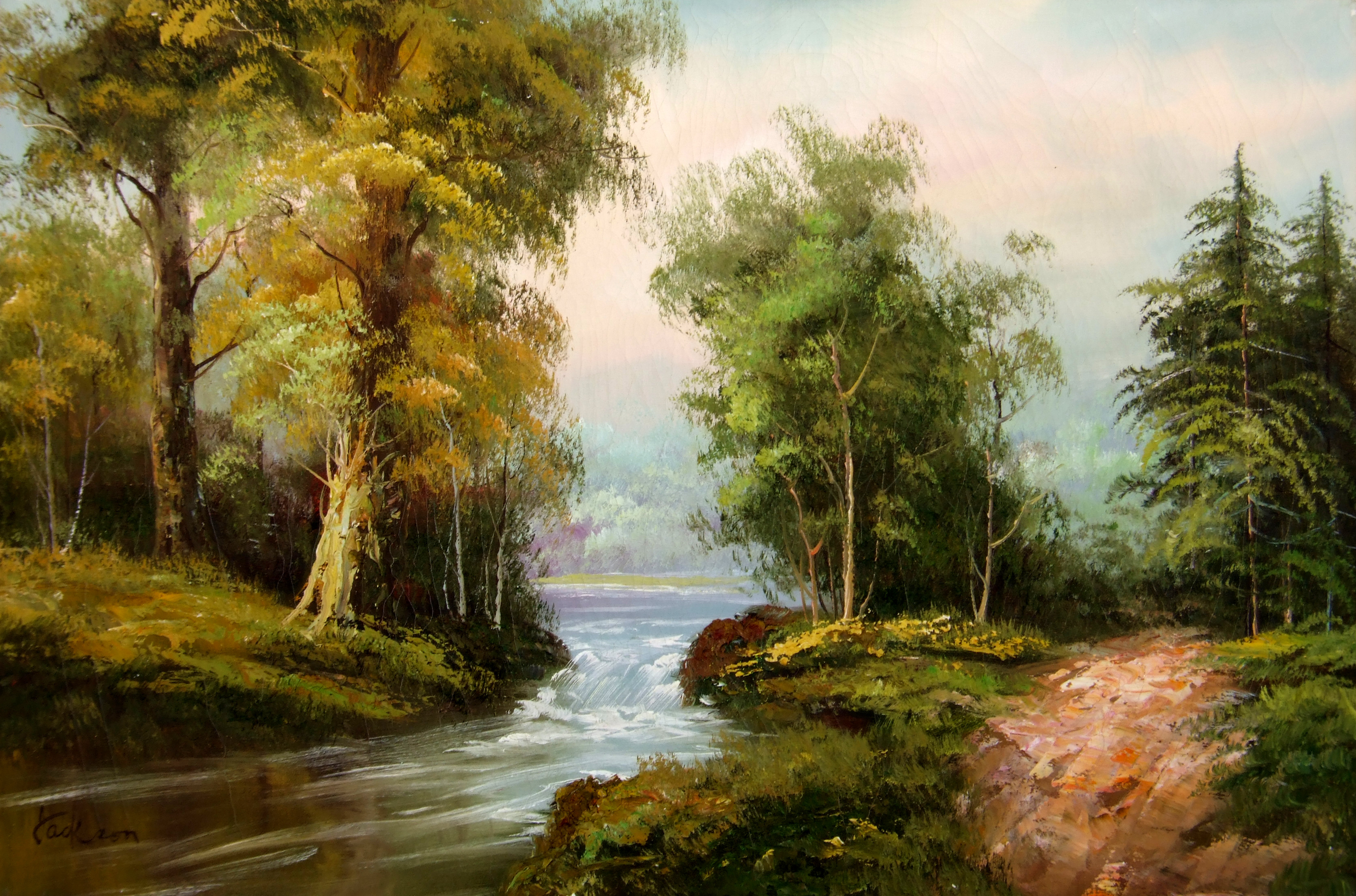
Muddy Pond, VT (Rutland), by William Henry Jackson

The town was originally granted in 1761 by Governor Benning Wentworth as one of the New Hampshire Grants. He named it after John Manners, 3rd Duke of Rutland. It is also recorded that John Murray who was the first named proprietor and from Rutland named it. It was one of the most successful of those grants because of the excellent farmland and gentle topography.

In the early 19th century, small high-quality marble deposits were discovered in Rutland, and in the 1830s, a large deposit of nearly solid marble of high quality was found in what is now West Rutland. By the 1840s, small firms had begun operations, but marble quarries only became profitable when the railroad came to Rutland in 1851. As fate would have it, the famous quarries of Carrara in Tuscany, Italy, became largely unworkable because of their extreme depth at the same time, and Rutland quickly became one of the leading producers of marble in the world. This fueled enough growth and investment that in 1886, the marble companies saw to it that the present Rutland City was incorporated as a village, and most of the town was split off as West Rutland and Proctor, which between them contained the bulk of the marble quarries. Proctor was named for and almost completely owned by Senator Redfield Proctor. In 1892, Rutland City was incorporated, and the remaining town of Rutland, which encircled it, was primarily rural.

== Geography ==
According to the United States Census Bureau, the town has a total area of 19.3 square miles (50.0 km^{2}), of which 19.2 square miles (49.7 km^{2}) is land and 0.1 square miles (0.3 km^{2}) is water. Rutland is drained by Otter Creek, Moon Brook, Tenney Brook, East Creek and Mussey Brook.

The town is crossed by U.S. Route 4, U.S. Route 7 and Vermont Route 4A.

The town of Rutland is home to the former Diamond Run Mall and Castleton University's Spartan Arena.

== Demographics ==
Historical population
| Census | Pop. | Note | %± |
|---|---|---|---|
| 1790 | 1,407 | | — |
| 1800 | 2,125 | | 51.0% |
| 1810 | 2,379 | | 12.0% |
| 1820 | 2,369 | | −0.4% |
| 1830 | 2,753 | | 16.2% |
| 1840 | 2,708 | | −1.6% |
| 1850 | 3,715 | | 37.2% |
| 1860 | 7,577 | | 104.0% |
| 1870 | 9,834 | | 29.8% |
| 1880 | 12,149 | | 23.5% |
| 1890 | 11,760 | | −3.2% |
| 1900 | 1,109 | | −90.6% |
| 1910 | 1,311 | | 18.2% |
| 1920 | 1,270 | | −3.1% |
| 1930 | 1,387 | | 9.2% |
| 1940 | 1,350 | | −2.7% |
| 1950 | 1,416 | | 4.9% |
| 1960 | 1,542 | | 8.9% |
| 1970 | 2,248 | | 45.8% |
| 1980 | 3,300 | | 46.8% |
| 1990 | 3,781 | | 14.6% |
| 2000 | 4,038 | | 6.8% |
| 2010 | 4,054 | | 0.4% |
| 2020 | 3,924 | | −3.2% |
U.S. Decennial Census

As of the census of 2010, there were 4,054 people, 1,691 households, and 1,166 families residing in the town. The population density was 209.7 people per square mile (81.0/km^{2}). There were 1,761 housing units at an average density of 91.5 per square mile (35.3/km^{2}). There were 1,691 households, out of which 28.6% had children under the age of 18 living with them, 58.1% were married couples living together, 8.9% had a female householder with no husband present, and 31.0% were non-families. 26.6% of all households were made up of individuals, and 13.5% had someone living alone who was 65 years of age or older. The average household size was 2.35 and the average family size was 2.85.

In the town, the population was spread out, with 22.1% under the age of 18, 4.3% from 18 to 24, 22.9% from 25 to 44, 32.0% from 45 to 64, and 18.8% who were 65 years of age or older. The median age was 45 years. For every 100 females, there were 89.4 males. For every 100 females age 18 and over, there were 84.4 males.

The median income for a household in the town was $44,420, and the median income for a family was $55,134. Males had a median income of $37,005 versus $25,053 for females. The per capita income for the town was $24,400. About 4.9% of families and 6.4% of the population were below the poverty line, including 8.8% of those under the age of 18 and 7.7% of those ages 65 or older.

== Notable people ==
- Benjamin Alvord, Civil War general, mathematician, and botanist
- Horace Henry Baxter, Adjutant General of the Vermont Militia during the American Civil War
- John Deere, blacksmith and industrialist who founded Deere & Company
- Julia Caroline Dorr, author of prose and poetry
- Merritt A. Edson, general in the United States Marine Corps
- Russell de Gree Flagg, luthier
- Walter E. Flanders, industrialist
- Martin Henry Freeman, first black president of a US college
- William Henry Jackson, painter, photographer and explorer
- Carlene King Johnson, Miss Vermont USA 1955, Miss USA 1955
- Aaron Lewis, vocalist and guitarist of Nu Metal/rock group Staind and solo musician
- William Marks, early figure in the Reorganized Church of Jesus Christ of Latter Day Saints
- James McNeil, member of the Vermont House of Representatives and Vermont Senate
- James Meacham, US congressman
- Zerah Mead, member of the Wisconsin State Assembly
- Kevin J. Mullin, member of the Vermont House of Representatives and Vermont Senate
- Robert E. Temple, Adjutant General of New York
- Cephas Washburn, Christian missionary and educator

== See also ==
- Rutland Herald
- Rutland Railway
