= Laurance Rockefeller Jr. =

Attorney from the United States

- Born: Laurance Spelman Rockefeller Jr. 1944 (age 81–82)
- Education: Harvard College; Columbia Law School
- Occupation: Environmental lawyer
- Spouse: Wendy Gordon
- Children: 2
- Parent(s): Laurance Rockefeller; Mary French
- Relatives: Rockefeller family

Laurance "Larry" Spelman Rockefeller Jr., (born 1944) is an American environmental lawyer. He worked for the Natural Resources Defense Council for 25 years. Rockefeller is now a trustee of the organization. He stated that his family all shared an interest in environmental matters. "If we see a problem, we roll up our sleeves, enlist the help of others, apply our resources and get the job done," he said.

== Family background ==
Rockefeller's parents were Laurance Rockefeller (1910–2004) and Mary French (1910–1997). He has three older sisters, Marion, Laura, and Lucy, and is a fourth generation member of the Rockefeller family. His patrilineal great-grandfather was Standard Oil's co-founder John D. Rockefeller and his matrilineal great-grandfather was Frederick H. Billings, a president of Northern Pacific Railway. Both of his grandmothers, Mary Billings French and Abby Aldrich Rockefeller, were important to the early development of YWCA USA.

== Political aspirations ==
Rockefeller ran for the Republican nomination in the 1992 United States Senate election in New York, campaigning against incumbent Alfonse D'Amato, and criticizing the conservative wing of the party. However, his campaign struggled to gain enough signatures to get on the ballot, and ultimately failed to do so.

== Board memberships ==
He is the co-founder and was the former Vice-Chair of the New York League of Conservation Voters, (NYLCV). Rockefeller is currently a Trustee of the Natural Resources Defense Council and President of the American Conservation Association. Rockefeller served as a member of the Palisades Interstate Park Commission for 27 years.

== See also ==
- Rockefeller family
- Laurance Rockefeller
- Mary French Rockefeller
- Marion Rockefeller Weber
- Lucy Aldrich Rockefeller
- Laura Rockefeller Chasin
