= Franklin S. Billings Jr. =

American judge (1922-2014)

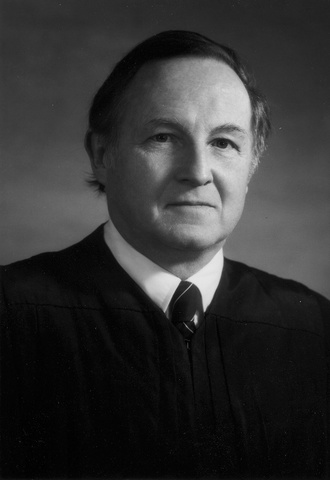

Senior Judge of the United States District Court for the District of Vermont
- In office September 9, 1994 – March 9, 2014

Chief Judge of the United States District Court for the District of Vermont
- In office 1988–1991
- Preceded by: Albert Wheeler Coffrin
- Succeeded by: Fred I. Parker

Judge of the United States District Court for the District of Vermont
- In office June 15, 1984 – September 9, 1994
- Appointed by: Ronald Reagan
- Preceded by: James Stuart Holden
- Succeeded by: John Garvan Murtha

Personal details
- Born: Franklin Swift Billings Jr. June 5, 1922 Woodstock, Vermont, US
- Died: March 9, 2014 (aged 91) Woodstock, Vermont, US
- Spouse: Pauline Richardson Gillingham
- Children: Franklin Swift Billings III; Jireh Swift Billings; Elizabeth Preudhomme Billings; Ann Billings Suokko
- Parent(s): Franklin S. Billings; Gertrude Freeman Curtis
- Relatives: Franklin Noble Billings (grand-father); Frederick H. Billings (grand-uncle)
- Education: Harvard College (B.S.); University of Virginia School of Law (J.D.)

Franklin Swift Billings Jr., BEM (June 5, 1922 – March 9, 2014) was an American politician and judge from the state of Vermont. Billings served as Speaker of the Vermont House of Representatives, Chief Justice of the Vermont Supreme Court and Chief United States district judge of the United States District Court for the District of Vermont.

== Early life ==
Franklin S. "Bill" Billings was born in Woodstock, Vermont on June 5, 1922, the son of Governor Franklin S. Billings and grandson of Franklin Noble Billings. He was raised in Woodstock and Milton, Massachusetts, graduated from Cardigan Mountain School and Milton Academy, and received a Bachelor of Science degree from Harvard College in 1943.

== World War II ==
Billings completed the Army Reserve Officers' Training Corps program at Harvard and received his commission as a second lieutenant. He was slated for training at Fort Sill when an Army physical uncovered a heart condition that disqualified him from military service. He then moved to Schenectady to work on a General Electric radar project for the United States Navy.

Billings then joined the American Field Service as a volunteer ambulance driver. He served with the British Eighth Army and the 6th Armoured Division, and earned the British Empire Medal. He was wounded at the Battle of Monte Cassino in Southern Italy in May 1944, requiring five months of recovery and recuperation at a United States Army hospital in Italy, then four months stateside. In 2010 he was awarded the Purple Heart.

== Early career ==
Billings attended Yale Law School for a year, and then transferred to the University of Virginia School of Law, from which he received a Juris Doctor in 1947. He then practiced law in Woodstock.

A Republican, he held several elected and appointed offices, including Village Trustee, Town Selectman, Town Meeting Moderator, Assistant Secretary and Secretary of the Vermont State Senate, Executive Clerk to Governor Joseph Johnson, and Secretary of Civil and Military Affairs (chief assistant) to Governor Robert Stafford. Billings also served as Judge of the Hartford Municipal Court from 1955 to 1962.

== Later career ==
Elected to the Vermont House of Representatives as a Republican in 1960, Billings served from 1961 to 1965. In the House Billings was one of the "Young Turks," a group of relatively junior members who pursued progressive policies regardless of party affiliation. The effort to end conservative Republican dominance of Vermont had gone on since the early 1900s with limited success. The Young Turks attained more success, including the election of fellow Young Turk Philip H. Hoff, a Burlington liberal, as Vermont's first Democratic Governor since the founding of the Republican Party in the 1850s.

He was Speaker in his final term. During his speakership, Vermont conformed to federal proportional representation requirements, moving the state House from a "one town, one vote" body of over 240 members to 150 members elected by district.

Billings became a Judge of the Superior Court in 1966. He was an associate justice of the Vermont Supreme Court from 1975 to 1983. In 1983, he was nominated for Chief Justice; he was succeeded as an associate justice by Ernest W. Gibson III, and served until 1984.

== Federal judicial service ==
Billings was nominated by President Ronald Reagan on May 25, 1984, to a seat on the United States District Court for the District of Vermont vacated by Judge James Stuart Holden. He was confirmed by the United States Senate on June 15, 1984, and received commission on June 15, 1984. He served as Chief Judge from 1988 to 1991. He assumed senior status on September 9, 1994. His service terminated on March 9, 2014, due to death.

== Retirement and death ==
In retirement Billings continued to reside in Woodstock. He died in Woodstock on March 9, 2014, at the age of 91.

== Family ==
Billings married Pauline (Polly) Richardson Gillingham in 1951, the granddaughter of Frank Henry Gillingham, founder of F. H. Gillingham & Sons at 16 Elm Street in Woodstock. The general store remains in the family and is operated by their two sons, Frank and Jireh Billings.

They had four children: Franklin Swift Billings III, Jireh Swift Billings, Elizabeth Preudhomme Billings and Ann Billings Suokko; and eight grandchildren: Jireh Swift Billings, Jr., Nathaniel Swift Billings, Calder Swift Billings, Isaac Billings Sacca, Susanna Sacca Billings, Mario Billings Sacca, Gertrude Sofia Suokko and Alden Southworth Curtis Suokko.

== Legacy ==
Billings was a member of the Vermont family for whom Billings, Montana, and the University of Vermont's Billings Library were named.

== See also ==
- Franklin S. Billings
- Franklin Noble Billings
- Frederick H. Billings
- F. H. Gillingham & Sons
- Marsh-Billings-Rockefeller National Historical Park
- Woodstock Railway
- Woodstock, Vermont

Political offices
Preceded by Leroy Lawrence	Speaker of the Vermont House of Representatives; 1963–1965	Succeeded by Richard W. Mallary
Legal offices
Preceded by James Stuart Holden	Judge of the United States District Court for the District of Vermont; 1984–1994	Succeeded by John Garvan Murtha
Preceded by Albert Wheeler Coffrin	Chief Judge of the United States District Court for the District of Vermont; 1988–1991	Succeeded by Fred I. Parker
