= Laura Rockefeller Chasin =

American philanthropist (1936–2015)

- Born: Laura Spelman Rockefeller; October 11, 1936
- Died: November 17, 2015 (aged 79); Cambridge, Massachusetts
- Occupations: Philanthropist and founder of the Public Conversations Project
- Known for: Philanthropy and member of the Rockefeller family
- Spouse(s): James H. Case (divorced); Richard Chasin
- Children: 3
- Parent(s): Laurance Spelman Rockefeller; Mary French

Laura Spelman Rockefeller (October 11, 1936 – November 17, 2015) was an American philanthropist. She was the eldest child of Laurance Spelman Rockefeller (1910–2004) and Mary French (1910–1997), and a fourth generation member of the Rockefeller family. She has two younger sisters, Marion, Lucy Aldrich Rockefeller, and a younger brother, Laurance Spelman Rockefeller Jr. Her patrilineal great-grandfather was Standard Oil's co-founder John D. Rockefeller and her matrilineal great-grandfather was Frederick H. Billings, a president of Northern Pacific Railway. Both of her grandmothers, Mary Billings French and Abby Aldrich Rockefeller, were important to the early development of YWCA USA. Chasin is known as the founder, former executive director, and former board member of the Public Conversations Project in Watertown, Massachusetts. She died in 2015 age 79

== Early life and education ==
Chasin was raised in New York City. She graduated from the Brearley School in Manhattan and Miss Porter's School in Farmington, Connecticut. She received a B.A. magna cum laude in Art History from Bryn Mawr College, an M.A. in Government from Harvard University, and an M.S.W. from Simmons College (Massachusetts) School of Social Work. She was trained in couple and family therapy and psychodrama.

== Personal life ==
In 1956, she married James H. Case, with whom she had three children and whom she later divorced. In 1971, she married psychiatrist Richard Chasin, who had three children from prior marriages. A leader in family therapy, he was president of the American Family Therapy Academy and an Associate Clinical Professor of Psychiatry at Harvard Medical School. He served for 12 years as president of the Rockefeller Family Fund and was a trustee of the Rockefeller Brothers Fund.

== Board memberships ==
Chasin served on the boards of the Rockefeller Family Fund, the Rockefeller Brothers Fund, and Spelman College. She also served on the boards of the Children's Defense Fund, the Conflict Management Group, and the Institute for Faith and Politics, and on the steering committee of the Common Ground Network for Life and Choice. She was described as a radical centrist thinker and activist.

Chasin was known as the founder, former executive director, and board member of the Public Conversations Project in Watertown, Massachusetts. This non-profit organization fosters constructive conversations about divisive public issues that involve clashing values, world views, and identities. Public Conversations' methods are designed to dissolve stereotypes, create trust, generate fresh ideas, and promote collaboration among those who have been chronically embattled. She also worked closely with No Labels and the National Institute for Civil Discourse, founded after the shooting of Congresswoman Gabby Giffords.

== Publications ==
- Chasin L, Chasin R, Herzig M, Roth S, Becker C., "The Citizen Clinician: The Family Therapist In The Public Forum." AFTA Newsletter (American Family Therapy Academy). 1991; Winter:36-42.
- Becker C, Chasin L, Chasin R, Herzig M, Roth S., "Fostering Dialogue on Abortion." PCP Website. 1992.
- Chasin R, Herzig M, Roth S, Chasin L, Becker C, Stains R Jr., "From Diatribe To Dialogue On Divisive Public Issues: Approaches Drawn From Family Therapy." Mediation Quarterly. 1996; 13(4).
- Chasin L, "Asking Wise Questions." PCP Website, 2001.
- Chasin, L, "How to Break the Argument Habit," in a series of articles on polarization called "Talking with the Enemy" published in the Christian Science Monitor, October 26, 2004.
- Chasin, L, "From Shouting Heads to Shared Concerns: An Interview with Laura Chasin," Leverage Points for a New Workplace, New World, e-newsletter of Pegasus Communications, Inc., July 18, 2006(76).
- Chasin, L, "Civic Social Work for the 21st Century," Gestalt International Study Center e-Newsletter, Issue Number 2, 2008.

== See also ==
- Rockefeller family
- Laurance Rockefeller
- Mary French Rockefeller
- Marion Rockefeller Weber
- Lucy Aldrich Rockefeller
- Laurance Spelman Rockefeller Jr.
