= Lucy Rockefeller Waletzky =

American philanthropist and environmentalist

- Born: Lucy Aldrich Rockefeller; 1941 (age 84–85)
- Education: Wellesley College, 1963 & Columbia College of Physicians & Surgeons, 1968
- Occupations: Retired Psychiatrist, Environmentalist and Philanthropist
- Known for: Philanthropy and Member of the Rockefeller family
- Spouse: Jeremy Peter Waletzky (divorced 1984)
- Children: Jacob (deceased 2001)and Naomi
- Parent(s): Laurance Spelman Rockefeller; Mary Billings French

Lucy Aldrich Rockefeller Waletzky (born 1941) is an American philanthropist and environmentalist. She is the third daughter of Laurance Spelman Rockefeller (1910–2004) and Mary French (1910–1997), and a fourth-generation member of the Rockefeller family. Waletzky served on the board of the Friends of the Rockefeller State Park Preserve from 1997 to 2006. She received the Governor's Parks and Preservation Award in 2004.

== Family ==
Waletzky has two older sisters, Marion Rockefeller Weber and Laura Rockefeller Chasin, and a younger brother, Laurance Rockefeller Her patrilineal great-grandfather was Standard Oil's co-founder John D. Rockefeller and her matrilineal great-grandfather was Frederick H. Billings, a president of Northern Pacific Railway. Both of her grandmothers, Mary Billings French and Abby Aldrich Rockefeller, were important to the early development of YWCA USA.

== Board memberships ==
Waletzky served on the board of the Friends of the Rockefeller State Park Preserve from 1997 to 2006. She received the Governor's Parks and Preservation Award in 2004. Waletzky concentrated her attention on the bird and wildlife habitat in the park. She was interested in the preserving health of the forests, wetlands, meadows. and streams there. From 1998 to 2004 Waletzky served as board member of the National Audubon Society where she worked to create, fund and develop a program for both the National and New York Audubon to stop the use of pesticides on home lawns and improve habitats for birds. Since 2002 she has been a member of the Westchester County Pest Management Committee. In that role, she created, developed and implemented an annual No Pesticides Day. Since March 2007 Waletzky has been the Chair of the New York State Council of Parks, Recreation and Historic Preservation. Prior to being appointed as Chair of NYS Coiuncil of Parks, Dr. Waletzky served as Chair of the Taconic Region Parks Commission and a member of the New York State Council of Parks. Dr Waletzky is a founding board member of the Friends of Rockefeller State Park Preserve, responsible for helping to create a new master plan and bio-diversity study.

She is currently a longtime board member of the Memorial Sloan-Kettering Cancer Center, Grassroots Environmental Education Center. and Westchester Pest Management Committee.

== Philanthropy ==
In 2003, working to preserve the Northeast corner of the Rockefeller State Park Preserve, Waletzky donated 84 acres (34 ha) of land to New York state. She also donated ten acres (4.0 ha) to Westchester County. The donations were intended to be used for parking at the North County Trail Way bike path, and possibly to establish a new "green" headquarters building for the Westchester County Parks.

== Awards ==
Waletzky received the Governor's Parks and Preservation Award in 2004. She also was given both the State Council of Parks Commission Chair Award and Friends of Westchester County Parks Best Friend Award in 2006. In 2018, Open Space Institute awarded her the Land Conservation Award. In 2021, Dr Waletzky received the New York State Historic Preservation Award and the Lucy Rockefeller Waletzky Environmental Stewardship Award.

== Education & Career ==
Dr. Waletzky is a physician/psychiatrist and a graduate of Wellesley College in 1963 and Columbia College of Physicians and Surgeons, Columbia University in 1968. As a psychiatrist, she was a clinical assistant professor of Psychiatry, Obstetrics and Gynecology at Georgetown University Hospital, where she published numerous articles. In 1982, she co-founded the Medical Illness Counseling Center (1993 Significant Achievement Award) and also founded DateAble in 1987, a dating and friendship service for people with disabilities.Her background as a physician led to a concern about the effects of pesticides and other toxins on the health of people and wildlife.

== See also ==
- Rockefeller family
- Laurance Rockefeller
