= Franklin Noble Billings =

American businessman and banker

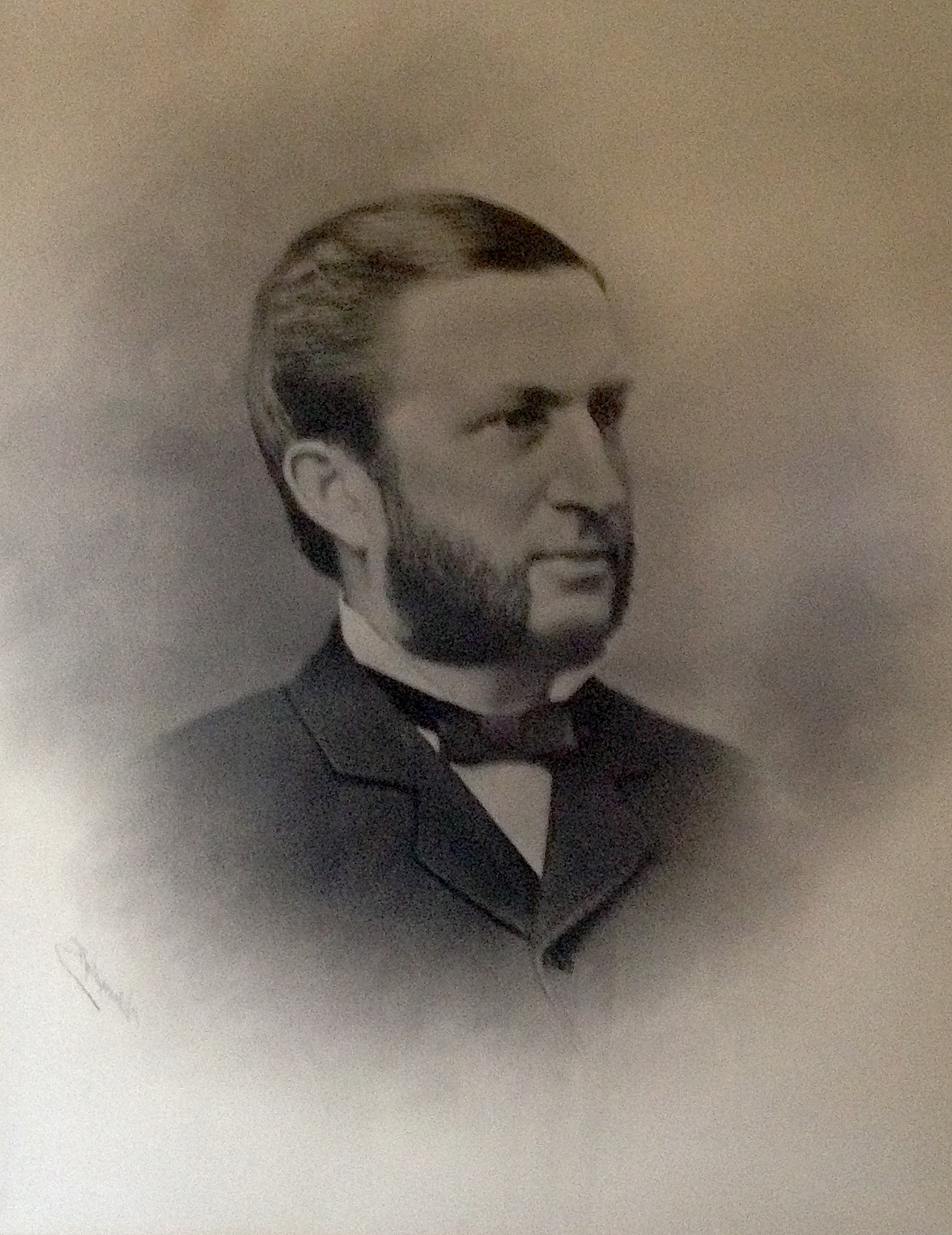
- Born: March 8, 1829; Royalton, Vermont
- Died: December 11, 1894 (aged 65); Woodstock, Vermont
- Resting place: Riverside Cemetery, Woodstock, Vermont
- Occupation: Businessman
- Years active: 1842-1894
- Spouse: Nancy Swift (m. 1859-1894, his death)
- Children: 1 (Franklin S. Billings)
- Relatives: Frederick H. Billings (brother); Franklin S. Billings Jr. (grandson); Mary Billings French (niece); Mary French Rockefeller (grand-niece)

Franklin Noble Billings (March 8, 1829 - December 11, 1894) was a Vermont businessman and merchant. A member of the prominent Billings family, he was notable for his investment stakes and management roles in several Vermont businesses. He was the father of Governor Franklin S. Billings and grandfather of Judge Franklin S. Billings Jr. In addition, he was the brother of Frederick H. Billings, uncle of Mary Billings French, and grand-uncle of Mary French Rockefeller.

== Early life ==
Franklin Noble Billings was born in Royalton, Vermont on March 8, 1829, to Oel Billings (1788–1871) and Sophia (Wetherbe) Billings (1796–1870). His family moved to Woodstock, Vermont when he was six, and he was educated in the schools of Royalton and Woodstock. At age 13, Billings began a mercantile career when he accepted a position in the general store of O. A. Bryant. He later moved to the store owned by Abram Stearns, and boarded with the Stearns family while continuing to learn his trade. From 1842 to 1846, Billings completed his education with attendance at Woodstock Academy.

== Career ==
During the California Gold Rush, Billings traveled to California, joining his brother Frederick, who had become a prominent attorney in San Francisco. Billings worked in the mercantile business at the San Francisco warehouse of Simmons, Hutchinson, & Co., and was briefly employed to book passage for travelers and transport of cargo on a Sacramento River steamboat, the Jenny Lind.

In 1852, he returned to Vermont. Shortly after arriving in Woodstock, Billings and a cousin traveled to Freeport, Illinois to explore business opportunities. They decided not to remain, and Billings returned to Woodstock to consider ventures closer to home.

In 1854, Billings and partner James B. Jones purchased the store and inventory of George R. Chapman. The Jones & Billings store operated until 1860, when a fire burned a large portion of downtown Woodstock. Billings constructed a store as part of Woodstock's newly built Phoenix Block commercial building, and his new venture opened in April 1861. He remained in business until 1894, when he sold the store to E. B. Wilson and William J. Boyce; Boyce had worked for Billings for more than 30 years.

Other business endeavors in which Billings was involved included promotion of the Woodstock Railway, of which he was an original incorporator and served as president. In addition, he was president of the Woodstock National Bank, Woodstock Gas Light Company, and Woodstock Aqueduct Company. Billings also served on the board of directors of the Woodstock Hotel Company and Norman Williams Public Library. When the Rutland and Woodstock Railroad Company was incorporated in 1882, Billings was one of two commissioners empowered to execute the corporation's initial stock subscription.

Billings occasionally took part in politics. A Republican, in June 1874 he was a delegate to the party's state convention in Burlington. In 1876, he was again a delegate to the state Republican convention. In 1880, Billings again attended the state Republican convention, this time as an alternate delegate.

== Family ==
In 1859, Billings married Nancy Swift (1822–1904) of New Bedford, Massachusetts. They were the parents of a son, Franklin S. Billings, who served as Governor of Vermont from 1925 to 1927.

Billings was also the grandfather of Franklin S. Billings Jr. who served as a state and federal judge. Billings' siblings included businessman and attorney Frederick H. Billings. In addition, Billings was the uncle of Frederick Billings' daughter Mary Billings French, and grand-uncle of Frederick Billings' granddaughter Mary French Rockefeller.

== Death and burial ==
Billings died in Woodstock on December 11, 1894. He was buried at Riverside Cemetery in Woodstock.

== Legacy ==
Locations with connections to Billings are included in the Woodstock Village entry on the National Register of Historic Places. These include the Amos Warren House, which Billings purchased in the late 1860s and remains in the Billings family. In addition, the historic district includes the Phoenix Block, where he owned and operated his store.

== Related ==
- Frederick H. Billings
- F. H. Gillingham & Sons
- Franklin S. Billings
- Marsh-Billings-Rockefeller National Historical Park
- Woodstock, Vermont
