= Mary French Rockefeller =

American philanthropist (1910–1997)

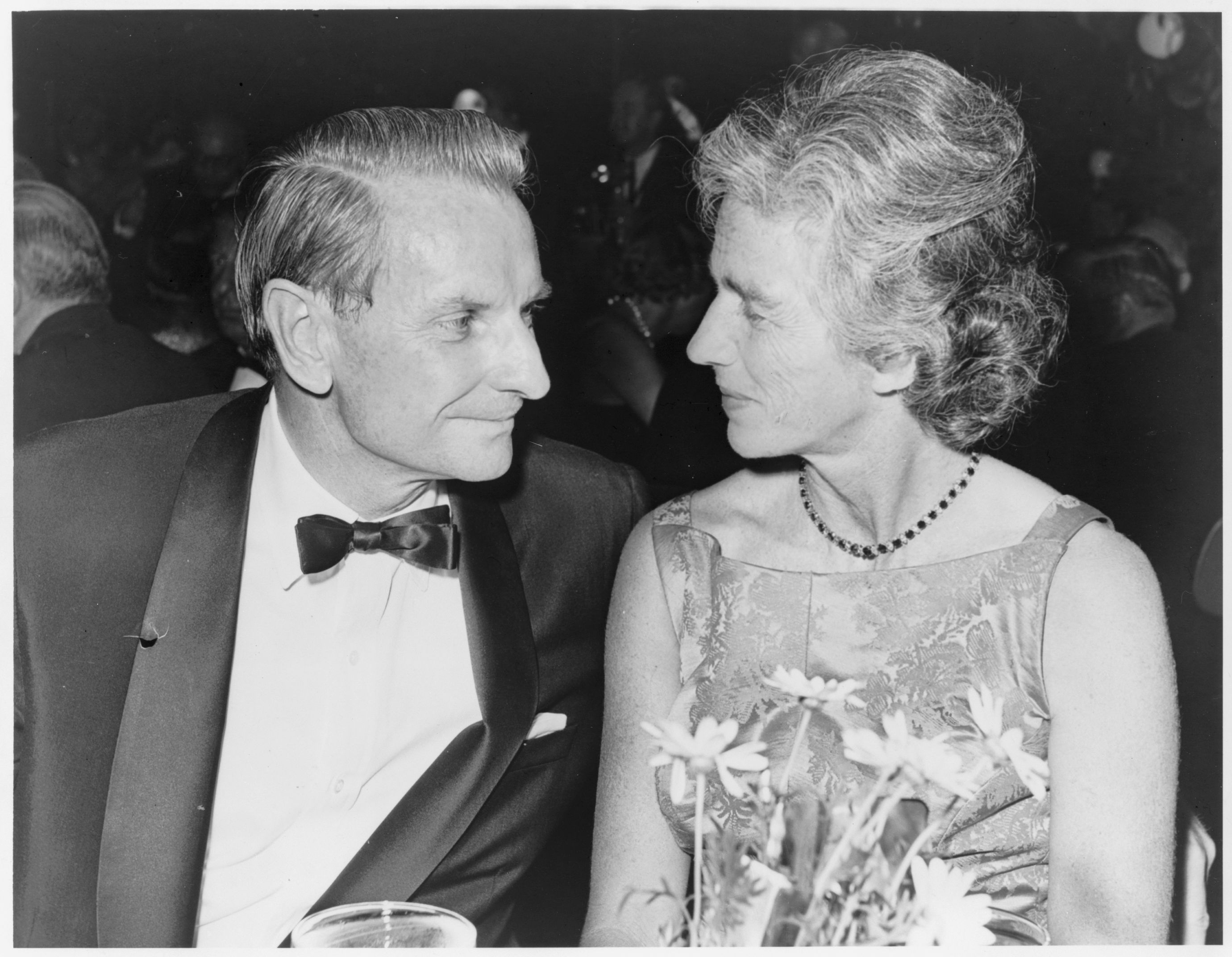
- Laurance and Mary French Rockefeller in 1965
- Born: Mary Billings French; May 1, 1910
- Died: April 17, 1997 (aged 86); New York Hospital-Cornell Medical Center
- Burial place: Rockefeller Family Cemetery; Sleepy Hollow, New York
- Education: Vassar College (1931)
- Occupation: Philanthropist
- Known for: Member of the Rockefeller family; Member of the Billings family; Philanthropy
- Board member of: YWCA National Board (1955–1973)
- Spouse: Laurance Rockefeller (m. 1934)
- Children: Laura Rockefeller Chasin; Marion Rockefeller Weber; Lucy Rockefeller Waletzky; Laurance S. Rockefeller Jr.
- Parents: John French; Mary Billings
- Relatives: Frederick H. Billings (grandfather); Franklin Noble Billings (grand-uncle)

Mary Billings French Rockefeller (May 1, 1910 – April 17, 1997) was an American heiress, socialite, philanthropist, and a member of the extensive Rockefeller family. She was married to Laurance Rockefeller, son of John Davison Rockefeller Jr. and Abby Aldrich Rockefeller. She was the mother of Laura Rockefeller Chasin, Marion Rockefeller Weber, Lucy Rockefeller Waletzky, and Laurance Spelman Rockefeller Jr.

== Early life ==
Mary Billings French was born to John French (b. December 4, 1863) and Mary Montagu Billings French (1869–1951), daughter of financier Frederick Billings. Her mother was an heiress while her father was a lawyer, and the couple married in 1907. John was the son of Warren Converse French and Sarah Ann Steele. Mary's mother (the elder Mary) was a society figure and maintained an apartment with her sister on Madison Avenue in New York City before she married.

Mary (the younger) had two siblings, an older brother John (1909–1984) and a younger sister Elizabeth, who went by "Liz" (1912–1976). John had been a roommate of Nelson Rockefeller while both attended Dartmouth College. The French children were born into "wealth and privilege", though Mary tried to live an unostentatious lifestyle as an adult. Through her mother, the younger Mary was a tenth generation descendant of Major Simon Willard, a Massachusetts historical figure.

== Personal life ==
Mary met Laurance S. Rockefeller in 1927. On August 15, 1934, Mary married Laurance at the First Congregational Church of Woodstock, Vermont, located on Elm Street. The ceremony was officiated by Reverend Herbert Hines and was attended by approximately 300 guests, followed by a reception at "The Hills", Mary's estate at the Marsh-Billings-Rockefeller compound. Together Mary and Laurance had:

- Laura Rockefeller Chasin (1936–2015)
- Marion Rockefeller Weber (born 1938)
- Lucy Rockefeller Waletzky (born 1941)
- Laurance "Larry" Spelman Rockefeller Jr. (born 1944)

On April 17, 1997, she fell in her apartment in Manhattan and died later the same day at the New York Hospital-Cornell Medical Center. Mary was 86 years old at the time of her death, and according to a Rockefeller family spokesman, she was in "failing health" for several years before her death.

=== Philanthropy ===
Mary worked closely with her husband on a number of philanthropic projects, mostly focused on conservationism and donation of their money, estates and time.

At the age of 41, Mary inherited what is now known as the Marsh-Billings-Rockefeller National Historical Park from her parents when her mother died in 1951, who had inherited it from her father Frederick. The estate included a mansion, dairy farm, and extensive grounds. In 1992, Mary and Laurance donated the property to the state and it was made into a National Historic Park. Lady Bird Johnson dedicated the house in a special ceremony.

Mary was an ardent supporter of the Young Women's Christian Association (YWCA), carrying on the tradition from her mother who was also involved with the organization. In 1951 she joined the YWCA National Board, then was vice-chairman and then chairman of the YWCA's international division from 1955 to 1973. From 1958 to 1964, she was chairman of the YWCA's World Service Council, followed by being elected to the YWCA Board of Trustees in 1988. Together with her husband, Mary flew over 50,000 miles for YWCA activities around the world.

The Mary French Rockefeller Educational Center is located at Camp Greenkill, Huguenot, New York.
