= Mary Billings French =

Mary Montagu Billings French
- Born: Mary Montagu Billings; March 6, 1869; Woodstock, Vermont
- Died: June 14, 1951 (aged 82); Hanover, New Hampshire
- Occupation: Heiress
- Board member of: Young Women's Christian Association
- Spouse: John French (m. 1907)
- Children: 3, including Mary French Rockefeller
- Parent(s): Frederick H. Billings; Julia Parmly
- Relatives: Franklin S. Billings (cousin); Franklin Noble Billings (uncle)

Mary Montagu Billings French (March 6, 1869 – June 14, 1951) was an American heiress and society figure, as well as YWCA president and board member. She was a daughter of Frederick H. Billings and inherited what later became the Marsh-Billings-Rockefeller National Historical Park from him before she died. She passed it on to her children, and it ultimately became the home of her daughter, Mary French Rockefeller, in 1960. She died in 1951.

== Early life ==
Mary Montagu Billings was born to Frederick H. Billings (1823–1890) and his wife Julia Parmly on March 6, 1869, in Woodstock, Vermont. Her mother Julia was born as the daughter of Dr. Eleazer Parmly of New York on December 8, 1835. Mary was named after her mother's older sister.

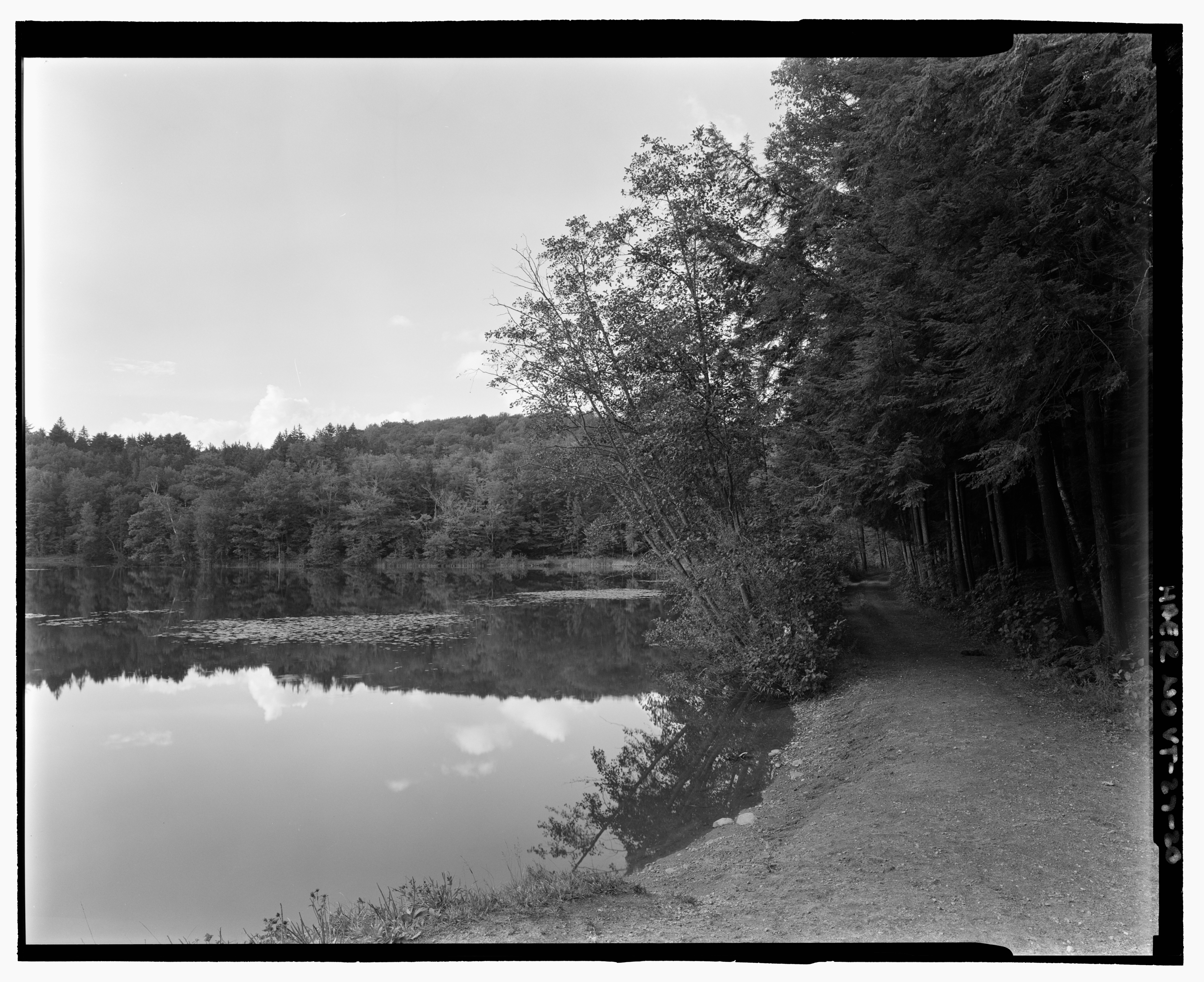
View of Pogue Road on the Marsh-Billings-Rockefeller Carriage Road, Woodstock, Windsor County, Vermont

Billings French had six siblings: Parmly (1863–1888), Laura, Frederick, Elizabeth, Ehrick (1872–1889), and finally Richard. Mary was the fourth child, after her brother Frederick and before her sister Elizabeth. The Parmly Billings Memorial Library, now called the Western Heritage Center, is named for Mary's brother Parmly.

Billings French grew up in a wealthy family during the Gilded Age. Her father Frederick was one of the wealthiest men in California and was considered one of its "foremost citizens". After marrying Julia, they settled in Woodstock, Vermont, where the family was the wealthiest family of the town "by far". They owned the largest corn field in the state of Vermont, as well as a mansion on the family compound.

=== Vermont estate ===
After the death of her father on September 30, 1890, Billings French inherited his Vermont compound. It comprised 4,228 acres and six buildings, including the mansion, stables, a cottage, a farmhouse, and other buildings. When she died, it passed to her three children. Ultimately, her daughter Mary took possession of the portions of the compound that later became a national park. At left is a view from the compound, the future Marsh-Billings-Rockefeller National Historical Park.

== Marriage and family ==
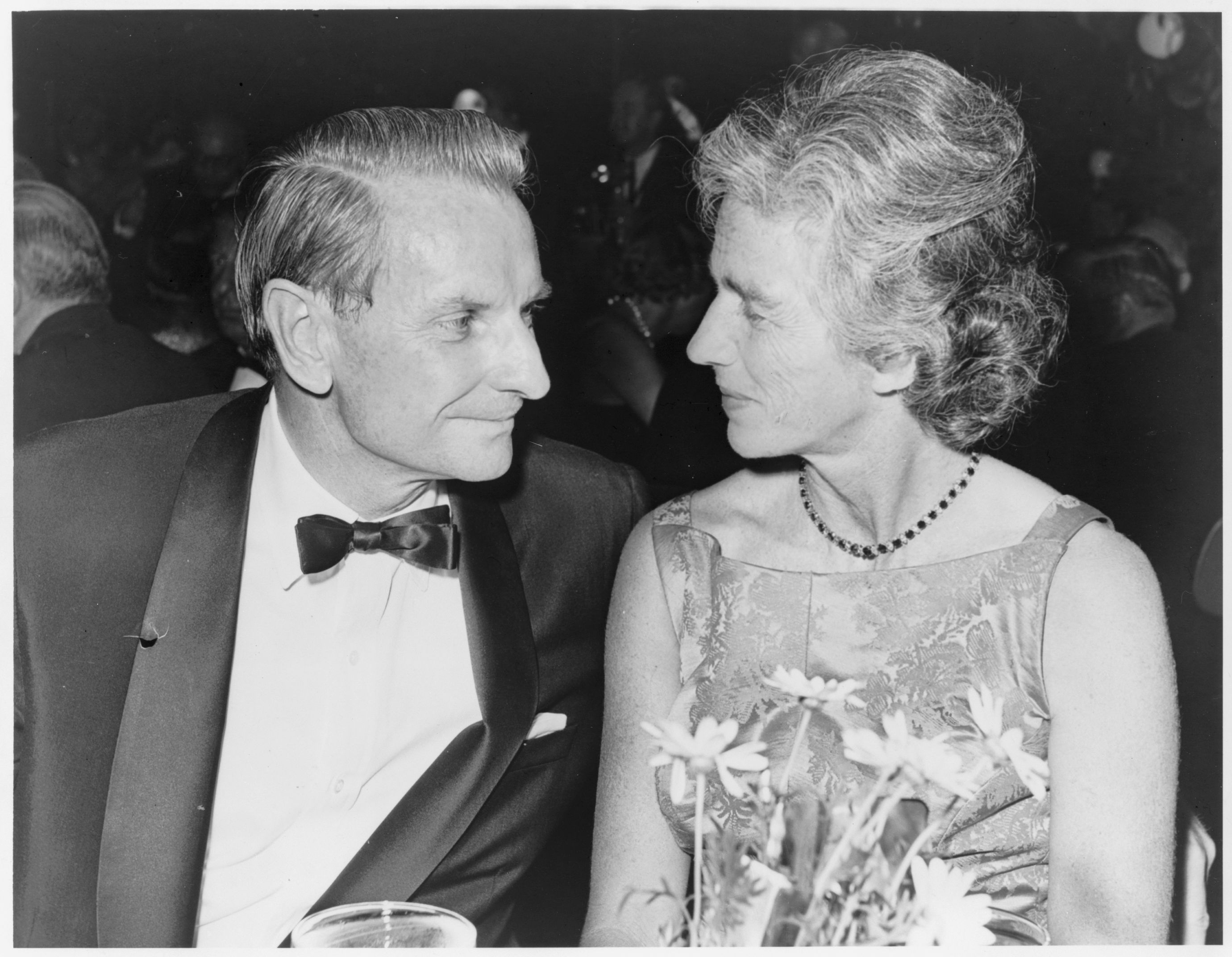
Mary's son-in-law Laurance S. Rockefeller and her daughter Mary French Rockefeller.

On June 1, 1907, she married John French, son of the Hon. Warren Converse French and Sarah Ann Steele. The couple married at noon with Rev. Dr. William R. Richards officiating at the Brick Presbyterian Church in New York. The best man at the wedding was James R. Kingsley, with ushers being Dr. Frederick S. Lee, William Norman Campbell, Richard Billings and Dr. Thomas M. Taylor. After the two married, they lived in an apartment on Madison Avenue in New York.

Together Billings French and John had three children:

- John French Jr. (1909–1984), who married Rhoda Walker on June 24, 1931. She was the daughter of Roberts Walker of White & Case law firm.
- Mary Billings French (1910–1997), who married Laurance Rockefeller, son of John Davison Rockefeller Jr. and Abby Aldrich Rockefeller
- Elizabeth "Liz" French (1912–1976), who married Ethan A. Hitchcock in 1937. He was a lawyer and direct descendant of Ethan Allen through Allen's grandson, Ethan Allen Hitchcock.

=== Descendants ===
Through her son John French Jr., French's grandchildren include: John French III of New York City, Roberts Walker French of Santa Fe, New Mexico, and Mary French Moore of Cheyenne, Wyoming. Through her daughter Mary, she was the grandmother of Laura Rockefeller Chasin, Marion Rockefeller Weber, Lucy Aldrich Rockefeller, and Laurance S. Rockefeller Jr.

== YWCA ==
Billings French was very involved with the Young Women's Christian Association, also known as the YWCA. She was chair of the executive committee, as well as president. Her daughter Mary also carried on the tradition; in 1951 she joined the YWCA National Board, then was vice-chairman and then chairman of the YWCA's international division from 1955 to 1973. From 1958 to 1964, she was chairman of the YWCA's World Service Council, followed by being elected to the YWCA Board of Trustees in 1988. Together with her husband Laurance, Mary flew over 50,000 miles for YWCA activities around the world, inspired from her mother's example.
