= F. H. Gillingham & Sons =

General store in Woodstock, Vermont, U.S.

- Type: Private
- Industry: Retail
- Founded: 1886; 140 years ago in Woodstock, Vermont
- Founder: Frank Henry Gillingham
- Headquarters: 16 Elm Street, Woodstock, Vermont, United States
- Key people: Jireh S. Billings
- Website: www.gillinghams.com
- F. H. Gillingham & Sons
- U.S. Historic district – Contributing property
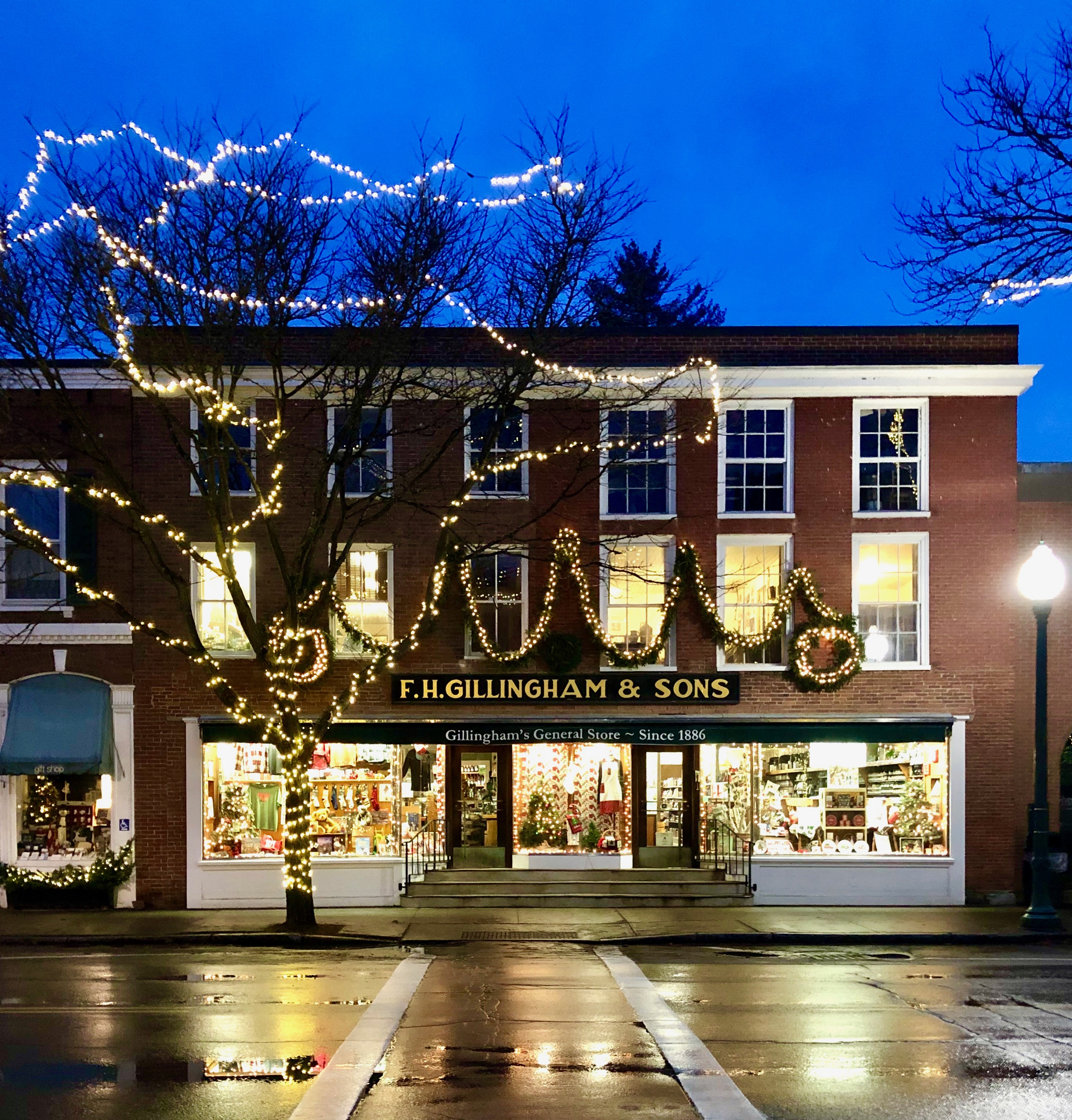
- F. H. Gillingham & Sons, Elm Street, November 2019

- Location within Vermont Location within the United States
- Coordinates: 43.6255494°N 72.5192811°W
- Part of: Woodstock Village Historic District (ID73000274)
- Designated CP: January 22, 1973

F. H. Gillingham & Sons is a historic general store in Woodstock, Vermont. Specializing in retail and mail order, the company was established in 1886, and is operated by the Billings family.

== History ==
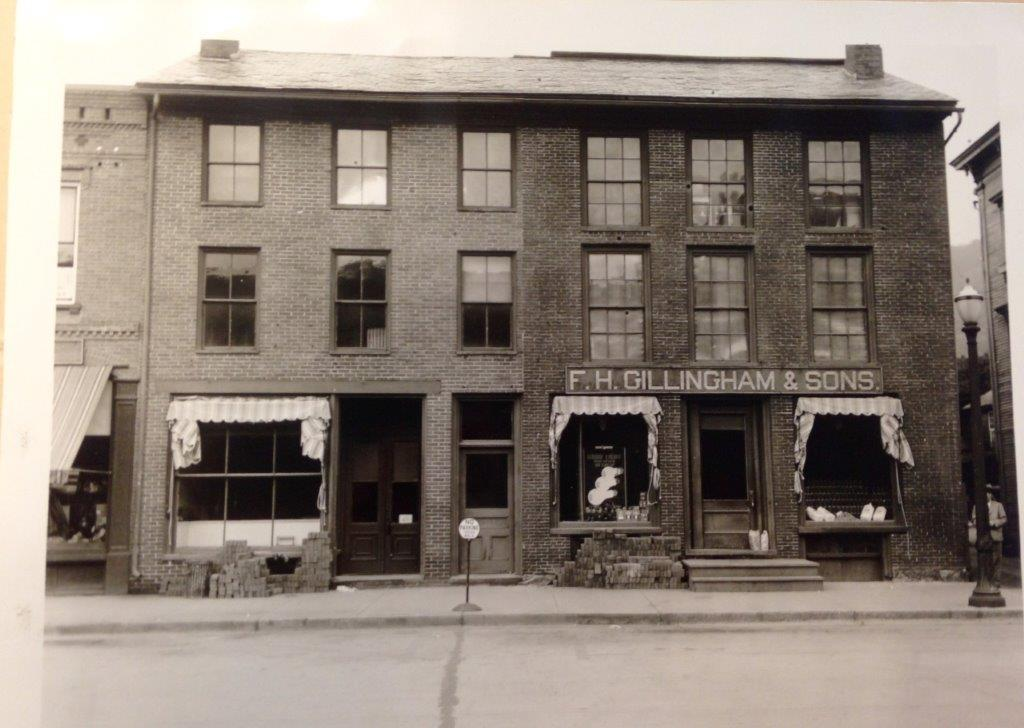
F. H. Gillingham & Sons, Elm Street, early 1900s

Founded in 1886, F. H. Gillingham & Sons remains in its original building at 16 Elm Street in Woodstock. It is the oldest, same-family operated general store in Vermont. It has partnered with local cheesemakers and other farmers to help promote and distribute Vermont products.

Frank Henry Gillingham, who worked as clerk in a general store in the building, purchased the store with a partner in 1884. By 1886, he bought out his partner and renamed the operation F. H. Gillingham's General Store. He expanded the store to use the entire building by around 1900. Today, the store maintains an appearance of an old-fashioned general store, with creaky wood floors and 8,000 square feet of rooms.

The store has been a popular tourist destination for several decades and has been featured in many New England, and national publications.

The Billings branch of the family bought the business during the 1970s; prior to that, the line of succession was from F. H. to his two sons to a grandson-in-law.

=== Architecture ===
The three-story brick Federal-style building was constructed in 1810 by Sylvester Edson and Titus Hutchinson. The first floor was used for a mercantile operated by Edson and Hutchinson's law office. The Vermont State Bank occupied the second story. It passed through a succession of owners over several decades and held various stores, including a livery.

The building is within the boundaries of the Woodstock Village Historic District, which has been listed on the National Register of Historic Places since January 22, 1973.

== See also ==
- Franklin S. Billings
- Franklin S. Billings, Jr.
- Frederick H. Billings
- Marsh-Billings-Rockefeller National Historical Park
- National Register of Historic Places listings in Windsor County, Vermont
- Woodstock Railway
