= Laurance Rockefeller =

American businessman, financier, philanthropist, and conservationist (1910-2004)

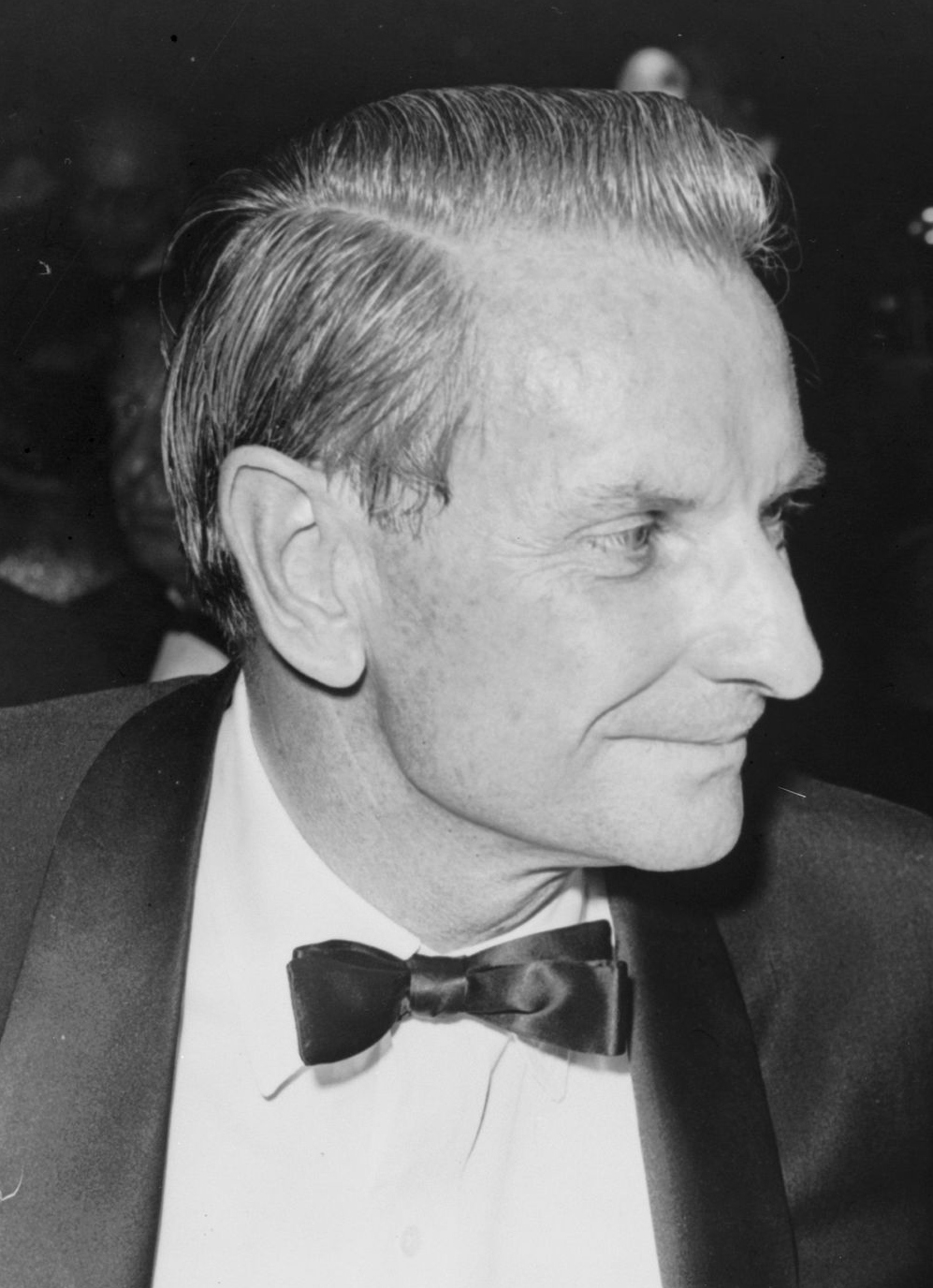
- Rockefeller in 1965
- Born: Laurance Spelman Rockefeller; May 26, 1910; New York City, New York, U.S.
- Died: July 11, 2004 (aged 94); New York City, New York, U.S.
- Education: Princeton University (AB)
- Occupations: financier, conservationist, businessman, philanthropist
- Spouse: Mary French (m. 1934; died 1997)
- Children: Laura Spelman Rockefeller; Marion French Rockefeller; Lucy Rockefeller Waletzky; Laurance S. Rockefeller Jr.
- Parents: John Davison Rockefeller Jr.; Abigail Greene Aldrich
- Relatives: Rockefeller family

Laurance Spelman Rockefeller (May 26, 1910 – July 11, 2004) was an American businessman, financier, philanthropist, and conservationist. Rockefeller was the third son and fourth child of John D. Rockefeller Jr. and Abby Aldrich Rockefeller. As a trustee of the Rockefeller Brothers Fund, he provided venture capital for Intel, Apple Computer, Piasecki Helicopter (later Boeing Helicopter), and many other successful start-ups. Rockefeller was known for his involvement in wilderness preservation, ecology and the protection of wildlife. Rockefeller used his family's oil fortune to fund conservation efforts and other ventures. His work helped the establishing of a new conservation ethic, and received the Lady Bird Johnson Conservation Award for Lifetime Achievement in 1997.

== Early life and marriage ==
Rockefeller was born in New York City, as the fourth child of John Davison Rockefeller Jr. and Abigail Greene "Abby" Aldrich. His siblings were Abby, John III, Nelson, Winthrop, and David.

He graduated from Princeton University in 1932 and attended Harvard Law School for two years, until he decided he did not want to be a lawyer.

On August 22, 1934, in Woodstock, Vermont, Laurance married childhood friend Mary French, whose mother, Mary Montagu Billings French, was a friend of Laurance's mother. When brother Nelson attended Dartmouth College, he shared a room with Mary's brother. Mary was granddaughter of Frederick H. Billings, a president of Northern Pacific Railway.

Laurance and Mary had three daughters and a son. They are Laura Rockefeller Chasin, Marion Rockefeller Weber, Dr. Lucy R. Waletzky, and Laurance S. "Larry" Rockefeller Jr. He had eight grandchildren and 12 great-grandchildren.

== Business, philanthropy, and interests ==
In 1937, he inherited his grandfather's seat on the New York Stock Exchange. He served as founding trustee of the Rockefeller Brothers Fund for forty-two years, from its inception in 1940 to 1982; during this time he also served as president (1958–1968) and later its chairman (1968–1980) for twenty-two years, longer than any other leader in the Fund's history. He was also a founding trustee of the Rockefeller Family Fund from 1967 to 1977.

He was a leading figure in the pioneering field of venture capital, founding a joint partnership with all five brothers and their only sister, Babs, in 1946. In 1969 this became the successful Venrock Associates, which provided important early funding for Intel and Apple Computer, amongst many other start-up technology companies, including many other firms involved in healthcare. Over the years his investment interests spread into the fields of aerospace, electronics, high temperature physics, composite materials, optics, lasers, data processing, thermionics, instrumentation and nuclear power. The family also had longstanding philanthropic ties, among them the Museum of Modern Art, Rockefeller University, and Memorial Sloan-Kettering Cancer Center.

Rockefeller's major interest was in aviation; after the War, he became friendly with Captain Eddie Rickenbacker, who had triumphed in many dogfights over Europe. Rockefeller had learned to fly, and found Rickenbacker's vivid accounts of an approaching boom in commercial air travel to be persuasive. Within a decade after Rockefeller's considerable investment, Eastern Airlines had become the most profitable airline to emerge after World War II. He became its largest shareholder. He also funded the pivotal post-WWII military contractor McDonnell Aircraft Corp.

In 1966, Rockefeller was considered by President Lyndon B. Johnson for the position of Secretary of Housing and Urban Development, then a newly-formed agency. The position instead went to Robert C. Weaver, the first African American Cabinet member in American history.

Rockefeller was a longtime friend and associate of DeWitt Wallace, who with his wife in 1922 co-founded Reader's Digest. Wallace, who was a major funder of the family's Colonial Williamsburg, appointed Laurance as an outside director in the company. He wanted to ensure that it preserved its patriotic mission of informing and educating the public, along with support for national parks, one of Rockefeller's primary interests.

Through his resort management company, Rockresorts, Inc., Rockefeller opened environmentally focused hotels at Caneel Bay on Saint John, United States Virgin Islands (1956; a favorite resort today for celebrities), some property of which was later turned over to the Virgin Islands National Park; in Puerto Rico, on Virgin Gorda in the British Virgin Islands, and Hawaii, contributing to the movement now known as eco-tourism. The last of these, the Mauna Kea Beach Hotel, was established in 1965 on the Kohala Coast of the island of Hawaii. Its most noted general manager was Adi Kohler, who later wrote the story of the construction of the famous hotel in his book "Mr. Mauna Kea" published by McKenna Publishing Group. While sailing past Virgin Gorda, Rockefeller spotted an idyllic half-mile crescent bay with what he dubbed "wilderness beach". In 1958 planning and land acquisition began for what would become Little Dix Bay. The resort opened in 1964 and on January 18, 2014, Little Dix Bay celebrated its 50th anniversary. In 1993, the resort became part of Rosewood Hotels & Resorts but remains true to Rockefeller's vision of natural harmony and balance while offering an escape from the ordinary. Elsewhere in the US Virgin Islands Rockresorts developed the Carambola Resort on St. Croix on an incredible stretch of beach that was also famous for being the setting for the closing scene of the movie Trading Places.

Rockefeller funded the Memorial Sloan-Kettering Cancer Center at a critical juncture of its early development. He also funded William Irwin Thompson's Lindisfarne Association, a think tank and retreat. He had a major involvement in the New York Zoological Society, along with support from other family members and philanthropies; he was a long-time trustee (1935–1986), president (1968–1971) and chairman (1971–1985).

In 1983, Laurance Rockefeller donated the primary funds to create The Mirror Theater Ltd, a New York-based theater company founded by Sabra Jones. The Mirror Theater Ltd is known for producing the 1983 Broadway play Alice in Wonderland at the Virginia Theatre and for the many plays performed by its Mirror Repertory Company.

Rockefeller also funded research of the PEAR lab, dealing with consciousness-based physical phenomena.

He also had an interest, gained via his mother Abby Aldrich Rockefeller, in Buddhism and Asian cultural affairs. He funded the research of Harvard Medical School Professor Dr. John E. Mack, author of Passport to the Cosmos. He also was reported to have supported the work of Dr. Steven M. Greer of the Disclosure Project. Rockefeller was also a patron to Roger A. Weir, specifically in relation to Weir's research on Jesus and Mary Magdalene.

Rockefeller opposed the harsh punishments of the war on drugs, including the "Rockefeller Drug Laws" that his older brother, Nelson, championed. He wrote to The New York Times in June 2002, "Overly harsh laws and punishments have reduced faith in government, which is essential to the functioning of a democracy."

== UFOs ==
In later life, Rockefeller became interested in UFOs. In 1993, along with his niece, Anne Bartley, the stepdaughter of Winthrop Rockefeller and the then-president of the Rockefeller Family Fund, he established the UFO Disclosure Initiative to the Clinton White House. They asked for all UFO information held by the government, including from the CIA and the US Air Force, to be declassified and released to the public. The first and most important test case where declassification had to apply, according to Rockefeller, was the Roswell UFO incident. In September 1994, the Air Force categorically denied the incident was UFO-related. Rockefeller briefed Clinton on the results of his initiative in 1995. Clinton did produce an Executive Order in late 1994 to declassify numerous documents in the National Archives, but this did not specifically refer to UFO-related files.

Laurance Rockefeller funded the UK's largest crop circle (pictograms) survey.

== Conservation ==
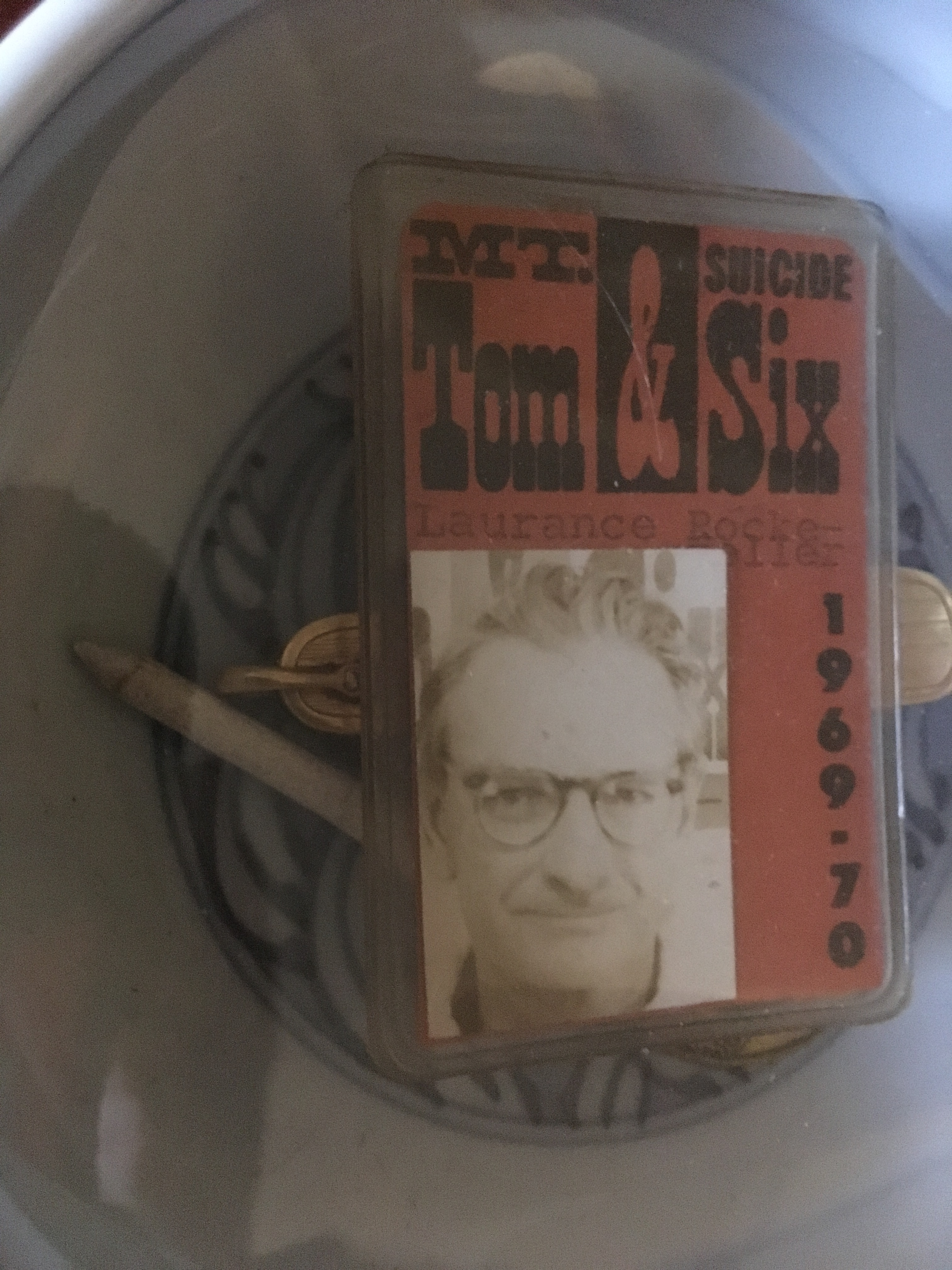
Laurance Rockefeller's ski pass for the years 1969-1970 for Mount Tom and Suicide Six in Woodstock Vermont

He was noted for his involvement in conservation (Lady Bird Johnson in 1967 labeled him "America's leading conservationist") and the protection of wildlife and was chairman of the Outdoor Recreation Resources Review Commission. He was also a recipient of the Lady Bird Johnson Conservation Award. He served on dozens of federal, state and local commissions and advised every president since Dwight D. Eisenhower on issues involving recreation, wilderness preservation and ecology. He founded the American Conservation Association and supported many other environmental groups.

He funded the expansion of Grand Teton National Park and was instrumental in establishing and enlarging national parks in Wyoming, California, the Virgin Islands, Vermont, Maine and Hawaii. In his home state, New York, he expended further cash and influence to help establish parklands and urban open spaces. There, as an active member of the Palisades Interstate Park Commission, he helped create a chain of parks that blocked the advance of urban sprawl.

In September 1991, he was awarded the Congressional Gold Medal for contributions to conservation and historic preservation. Awarded by President George H. W. Bush, it was the first time in the Medal's history (since 1777) that it had been awarded for outdoor issues, effectively naming Rockefeller as "Mr Conservation", who more than any other American had put this issue on the public agenda. Rockefeller said at the award presentation that nothing was more important to him than "the creation of a conservation ethic in America".

In 1992 Rockefeller and his wife Mary donated their Woodstock, Vermont, summer home and farm to the National Park Service, creating a national park dedicated to the history of conservation, now called the Marsh-Billings-Rockefeller National Historical Park. In 2001, Rockefeller transferred ownership of his landmark 1106-acre (4.5 km^{2}) JY Ranch to the Grand Teton National Park in Wyoming. It was accepted by Vice President Dick Cheney on behalf of the Federal government (see External Links below).

=== Affiliations ===
A partial list of Rockefeller's more notable conservation-related memberships:

- American Conservation Association, Inc. – Founder, President and Trustee
- American Museum of Natural History – Life Member
- The Conservation Foundation – Founding Member and Trustee, board of directors
- Environmental Defense Fund – Member
- Greenacre Foundation – Trustee
- Jackson Hole Preserve, Inc. – President
- National Audubon Society – Life Member (Recipient, Audubon Medal, 1964)
- National Geographic Society – Board of Trustees
- National Park Foundation – Vice chairman, board member Emeritus
- National Trust for Historic Preservation – Life Member
- National Wildlife Federation – Member
- The Nature Conservancy – Member
- New York Zoological Society – Trustee, Chairman
- Palisades Interstate Park Commission – President
- Save the Redwoods League – Life Member
- The Wildlife Conservation Society – Chairman
- World Wildlife Fund – Member

== Personal life ==
Mary Rockefeller died in 1997, at the age of 86. Following his wife Mary's death, Rockefeller returned to New York. He died in his sleep of natural cause by pulmonary fibrosis on July 11, 2004, at the age of 94. Laurance Rockefeller was survived by his four children. He was interred next to his wife at the Rockefeller Family Cemetery in Sleepy Hollow.

== See also ==
- Rockefeller family
- David Rockefeller
- Rockefeller Brothers Fund
- Venture capital
- Private equity
- Memorial Sloan-Kettering Cancer Center
