= Woodstock Railway =

Former railroad company in Central Vermont

Overview
- Locale: Windsor County, Vermont
- Termini: White River Junction; Woodstock
- Stations: 6

History
- Opened: 1875
- Closed: April 15, 1933

Technical
- Track gauge: 4 ft 8 1/2 in (1,435 mm)

The Woodstock Railway was a railroad in Windsor County, Vermont, connecting Woodstock with White River Junction. The line extended approximately 14 miles (23 km) and served communities along the Ottauquechee River valley. Originally incorporated as the Woodstock Railroad, the company was reorganized in 1890 and thereafter operated as the Woodstock Railway.

== History ==
The Woodstock Railroad was chartered by the Vermont legislature in 1863 to construct a railroad between Woodstock and White River Junction. Little progress was made until 1867, when sufficient funds were raised to begin construction. Work began in 1868 and continued intermittently over the following years. The railroad was completed in 1875 and opened to traffic that year.

Construction required several significant engineering works, including a cut approximately 1 mile (1.6 km) long through Stanley Hill and a bridge spanning Quechee Gorge on the Ottauquechee River.

In 1890 the company underwent financial reorganization and adopted the name Woodstock Railway. The line remained in operation until 1933. The final train operated on April 15, 1933.

The bridge at Quechee Gorge was rebuilt several times during the railroad's existence. The original trestle was succeeded by a wooden arch bridge and, in 1911, by a steel structure approximately 163 feet (50 m) high. Following abandonment of the railroad, the bridge was converted for highway use. It remains in service as the Quechee Gorge Bridge, carrying U.S. Route 4 across the gorge.

After abandonment, portions of the railroad's right-of-way east of Woodstock were incorporated into the alignment of U.S. Route 4.

== Stations ==
An 1877 timetable listed the following stations from east to west:

Station	Notes
White River Junction	Connection with the Central Vermont Railway
Hartford	—
Dewey's Mills	—
Quechee	—
Taftsville	—
Woodstock	Western terminus

== See also ==
- Frederick H. Billings
- Franklin Noble Billings
- F. H. Gillingham & Sons

== Sources ==
- Jones, Robert C., Railroads of Vermont, Volume II, 1993.
- Mead, Edgar T., Over the Hills to Woodstock, 1967.

== Archives and records ==
- Woodstock Railroad Company records at Baker Library Special Collections, Harvard Business School.
