= 1924 Vermont gubernatorial election =

- November 4, 1924
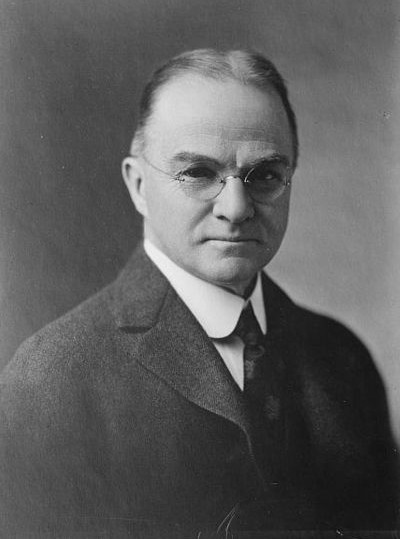

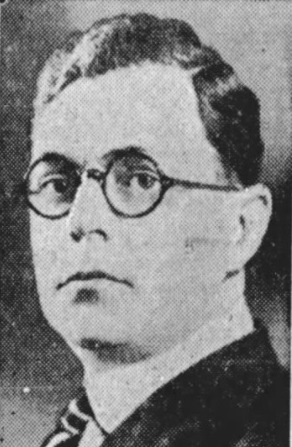
Nominee	Franklin S. Billings	Fred C. Martin
Party	Republican	Democratic
Popular vote	75,510	18,263
Percentage	79.24%	19.17%
- Billings: 50–60% 60–70% 70–80% 80–90% 90-100% Martin: 40–50% 50–60% No Vote/Data
Governor before election
Redfield Proctor Jr.
Republican
Elected Governor
Franklin S. Billings
Republican

The 1924 Vermont gubernatorial election took place on November 4, 1924. Per the "Mountain Rule", incumbent Republican Redfield Proctor Jr. did not run for re-election to a second term as Governor of Vermont. Republicans nominated Franklin S. Billings. The Democratic nomination was won by Howard E. Shaw. Shaw died before the general election, and the Vermont Democratic Party selected Fred C. Martin as his replacement. Billings defeated Martin in the general election and succeeded Proctor.

== Republican primary ==
=== Results ===
Republican primary results
Party	Candidate	Votes	%	±%
Republican	Franklin S. Billings	29,791	72.4	
Republican	Roland E. Stevens	11,346	27.6	
Republican	Other	4	0.0	
Total votes		41,141	100.0	

== Democratic primary ==
=== Results ===
Democratic primary results
Party	Candidate	Votes	%	±%
Democratic	Howard E. Shaw	2,382	99.9	
Democratic	Other	3	0.1	
Total votes		2,385	100.0	

== General election ==
=== Results ===
1924 Vermont gubernatorial election
Party	Candidate	Votes	%	±%
Republican	Franklin S. Billings	75,510	79.24	
Democratic	Fred C. Martin	18,263	19.17	
Prohibition	George S. Wood	1,496	1.57	
N/A	Other	16	0.02	
Total votes		95,285	100.0	
