= First Congregational Church of Woodstock, Vermont =

Church in Woodstock, United States of America

Coordinates: 43.62757°N 72.51830°W

The First Congregational Church of Woodstock, Vermont is an active Congregational church in Woodstock, Vermont. The original building was constructed in 1807. It acquired a bell produced by Paul Revere. The building was rebuilt in 1890.

It is the historic church of Marsh-Billings-Rockefeller, and a historical account of the church was published in 1947.

== See also ==
- Marsh-Billings-Rockefeller National Historical Park
