= Billings Memorial Library =

Library in Burlington, Vermont, US

Billings Library
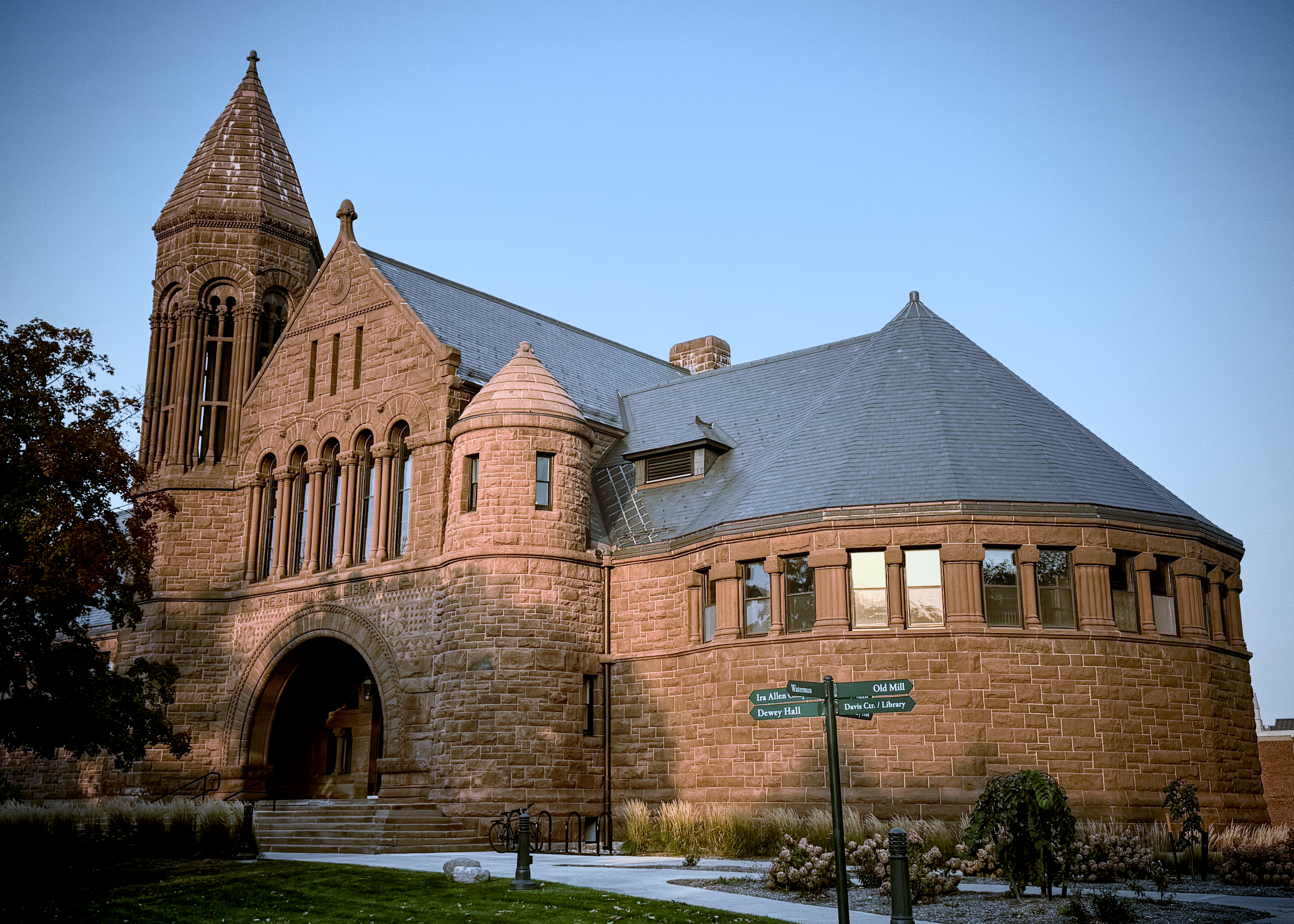

General information
- Address: 48 University Place
- Town or city: Burlington, Vermont
- Country: United States
- Coordinates: 44.479315°N 73.199099°W
- Completed: 1883
- Owner: University of Vermont

Design and construction
- Architect(s): Henry Hobson Richardson

Billings Memorial Library is an academic library of the University of Vermont, located in Burlington, Vermont. Built in 1883, it was designed by American architect Henry Hobson Richardson to resemble the Winn Library in Woburn, Massachusetts.

== History ==
The library was donated to the University of Vermont by Frederick H. Billings, of Woodstock. It has been a central part of campus life since opening in 1885, and despite the University's growth over the intervening century, it has remained architecturally similar to its original appearance.

A new library, the Guy W. Bailey Library (now known as the Howe Library), was built by the university in 1961 due to a lack of space at Billings Library. The Billings Library was then converted to a student center in 1963. After the building was determined to have been outgrown for student center purposes, the Dudley H. Davis Center was built and completed in 2007 to be the university's new student center.

Thanks to an $11.4 million renovation completed in the summer of 2018, UVM's most architecturally significant building once again houses academic departments, including Special Collections, the Miller Center for Holocaust Studies, the Humanities Center, and the Center for Research on Vermont.

== Gallery ==
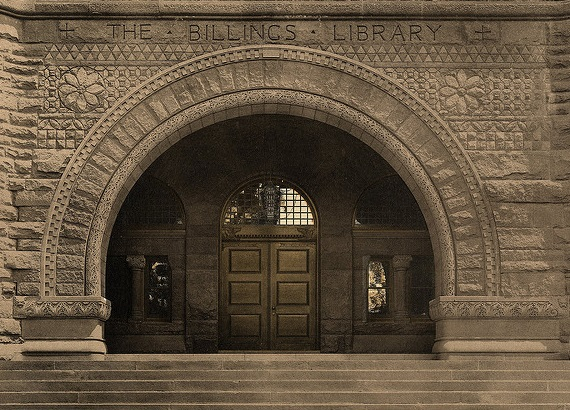
Main Entrance

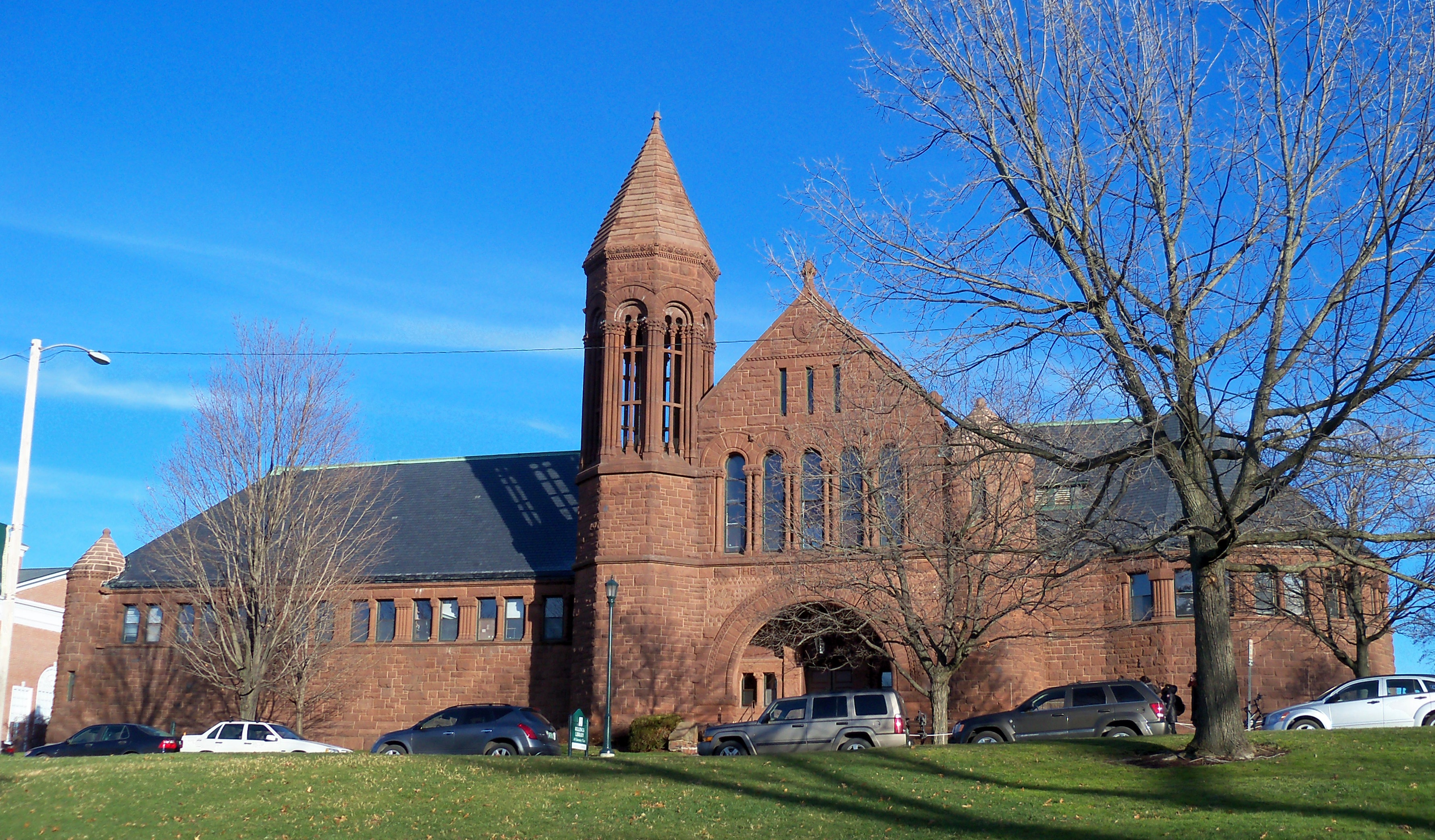
Modern Exterior c. 2015

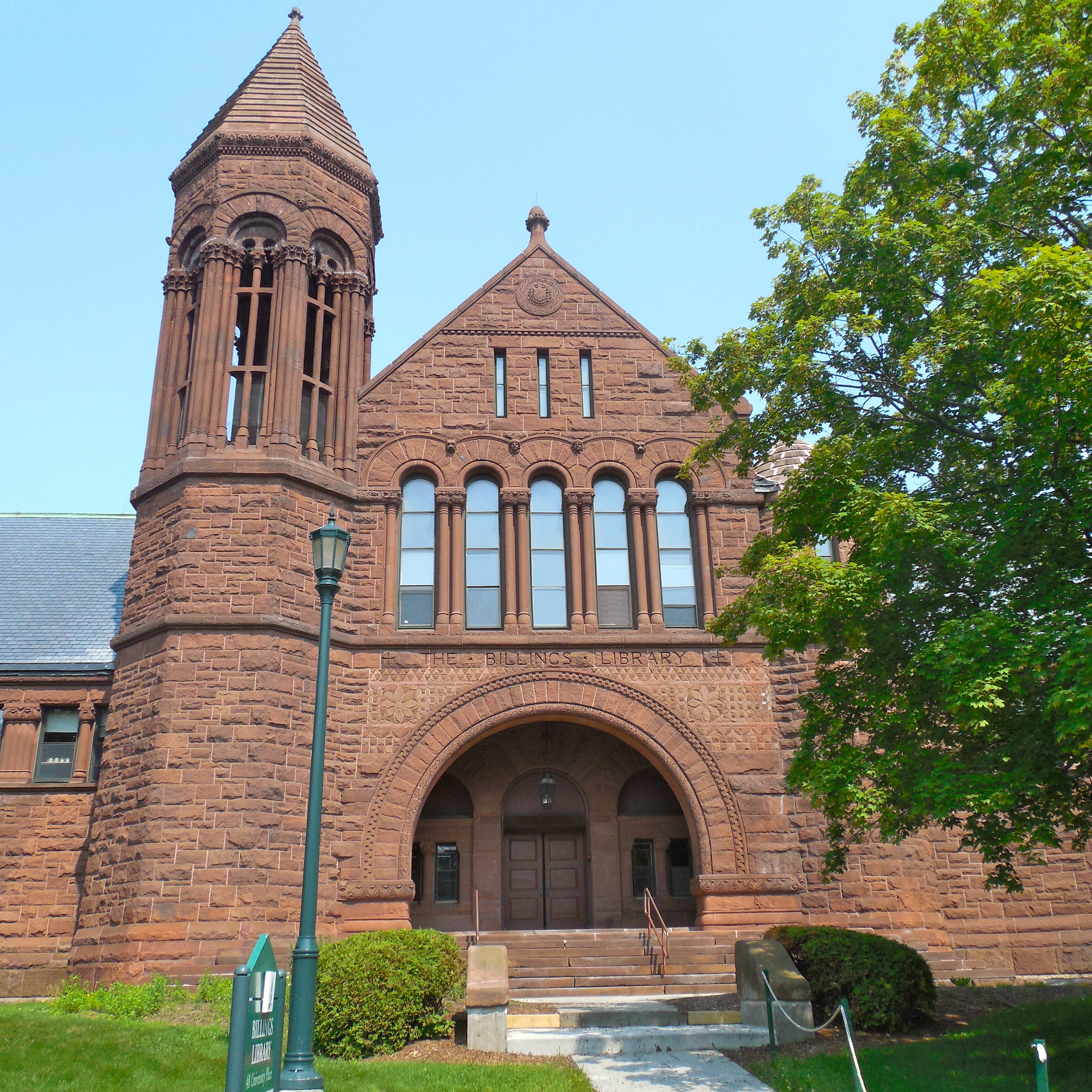
Exterior c. 2015

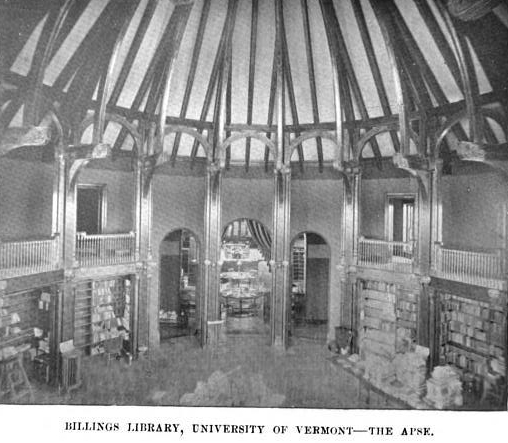
Interior of The Apse, c. 1895

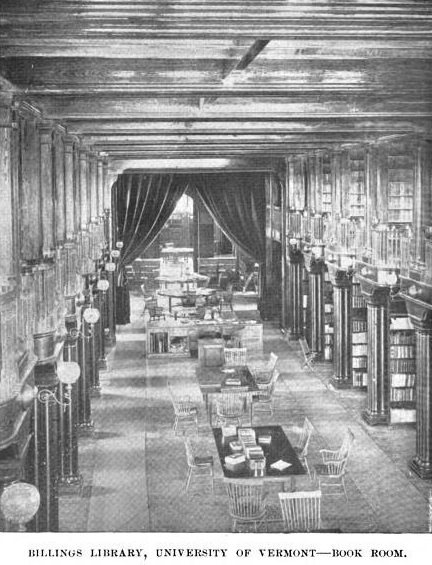
Book Room, c. 1895

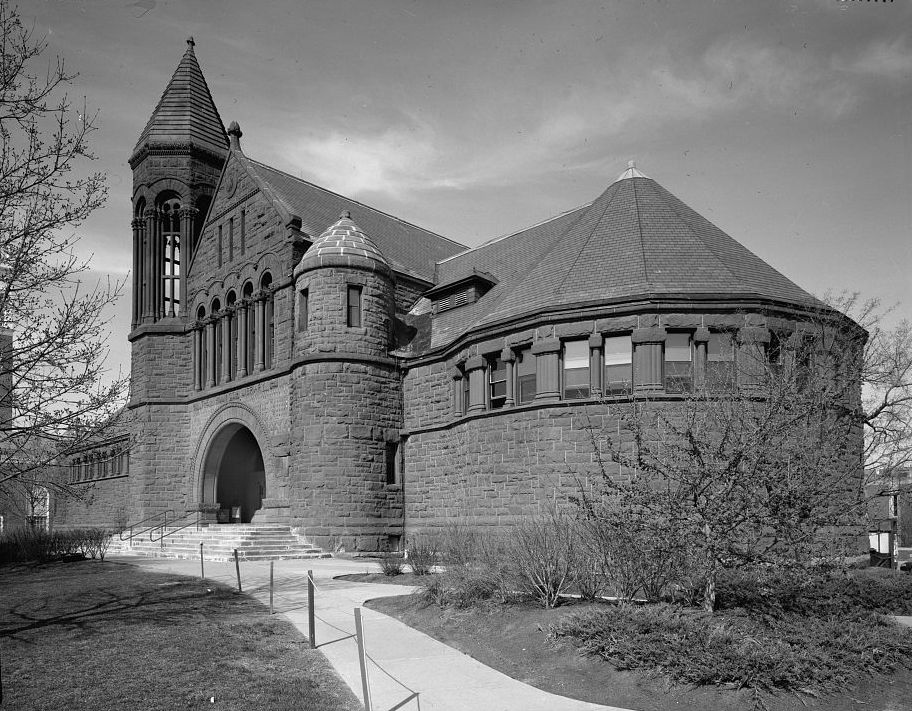
Exterior, 2006

== Related ==
- Frederick H. Billings
- University of Vermont
- Woodstock, Vermont
