= Franklin S. Billings =

American politician (1862–1935)

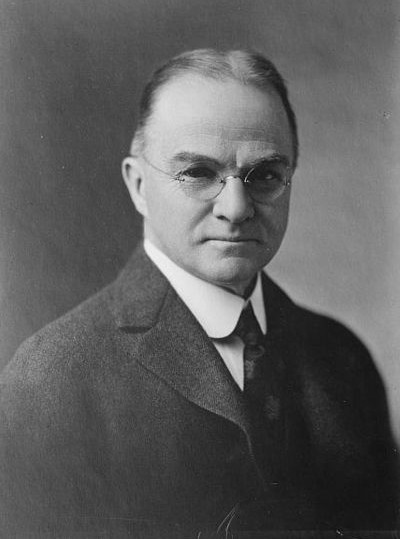

60th Governor of Vermont
- In office January 8, 1925 – January 6, 1927
- Lieutenant: Walter K. Farnsworth
- Preceded by: Redfield Proctor Jr.
- Succeeded by: John E. Weeks

54th Lieutenant Governor of Vermont
- In office January 4, 1923 – January 8, 1925
- Governor: Redfield Proctor, Jr.
- Preceded by: Abram W. Foote
- Succeeded by: Walter K. Farnsworth

Speaker of the Vermont House of Representatives
- In office 1921–1923
- Preceded by: Charles S. Dana
- Succeeded by: Orlando L. Martin

Member of the Vermont House of Representatives from Woodstock
- In office 1921–1923
- Preceded by: Charles Martin White
- Succeeded by: Norman Williams
- In office 1910–1915
- Preceded by: Wales N. Johnson
- Succeeded by: John Stearns Eaton

Personal details
- Born: Franklin Swift Billings; May 11, 1862 New Bedford, Massachusetts, U.S.
- Died: January 16, 1935 (aged 72) Woodstock, Vermont, U.S.
- Resting place: Riverside Cemetery, Woodstock, Vermont, U.S.
- Party: Republican
- Spouses: Bessie Hewitt Vail (m. 1892; died 1917) Gertrude Freeman Curtis (after 1917)
- Children: 4; including Franklin S. Billings, Jr.
- Parent(s): Franklin Noble Billings; Nancy Swift Billings
- Relatives: Frederick H. Billings (uncle); Mary Billings French (cousin)
- Profession: Businessman

Military service
- Allegiance: United States; Vermont
- Service: Vermont National Guard
- Years of service: 1904–1906
- Rank: Colonel
- Unit: Staff of Governor Charles J. Bell

Franklin Swift Billings (May 11, 1862 – January 16, 1935) was an American businessman and politician from Woodstock, Vermont. He served as the 54th lieutenant governor of Vermont from 1923 to 1925 and as the 60th governor of Vermont from 1925 to 1927.

== Early life ==
Billings was born in New Bedford, Massachusetts, on May 11, 1862. His parents were Franklin Noble Billings and Nancy Swift Billings.

He was educated at Adams Academy in Quincy, and graduated from Milton Academy in Milton, Massachusetts. Billings attended Harvard University and graduated in 1885.

== Career ==
Billings worked on a Kansas sheep ranch and then engaged in the import-export business in New York City. In 1903 he moved to Vermont and was a director of the Woodstock Railway Company, Hotel Company, Aqueduct Company, and Electric Company. Billings was also president of the Woodstock Ice Supply Company, and Treasurer of the Empire Building Company and the Vermont Investment Company.

From 1904 to 1906 he served on the staff of Governor Charles J. Bell as chief of staff of the Vermont National Guard with the rank of colonel. He was the longtime chairman of the Woodstock Village Meeting and an active Republican. He was also a member of the state Commission for the Conservation of Natural Resources and the State Board of Education.

After serving in the Vermont House of Representatives from 1910 to 1915, Billings returned to the Vermont House from 1921 to 1923 and served as Speaker.

From 1923 to 1925, Billings was lieutenant governor. In 1924, he won election as governor and served from 1925 to 1927. The federal government established national forests in Vermont during his gubernatorial administration. Also, the Motor Vehicle Department was created, and provision was made for the registration of motor vehicles.

After leaving the governorship he served on the state Liquor Control Board, and was a member of the Harvard University Board of Overseers.

== Personal life ==
On July 12, 1892, he married Elizabeth "Bessie" Hewitt Vail (1869–1917) of New York and they had three children: Elizabeth Swift Billings, Franklin Noble Billings, and Nancy Billings.

After his first wife's death in 1917, Billings married Gertrude Freeman Curtis (1881–1964) in 1919. They had one son; Franklin S. Billings Jr. (1922–2014), who became Chief Justice of the Vermont Supreme Court and Chief Justice of the United States District Court for the District of Vermont.

Billings died in Woodstock on January 16, 1935. He is interred at Riverside Cemetery, Woodstock.

== Legacy ==
Two Billings family legacies in Woodstock, the Marsh-Billings-Rockefeller National Historical Park and the Billings Farm and Museum were created to focus on conservation, rural life and agricultural history.

Party political offices
Preceded by Abram W. Foote	Republican nominee for Lieutenant Governor of Vermont; 1922	Succeeded by Walter K. Farnsworth
Preceded by Redfield Proctor Jr.	Republican nominee for Governor of Vermont; 1924	Succeeded by John E. Weeks
Political offices
Preceded by Abram W. Foote	Lieutenant Governor of Vermont; 1923–1925	Succeeded by Walter K. Farnsworth
Preceded by Redfield Proctor Jr.	Governor of Vermont; 1925–1927	Succeeded by John E. Weeks
