= Marion Rockefeller Weber =

American philanthropist

- Born: Marion Rockefeller; 1938 (age 87–88)
- Parent(s): Laurance Spelman Rockefeller; Mary Billings French

Marion Rockefeller Weber (born 1938) is the second eldest daughter of Laurance Spelman Rockefeller (1910–2004) and Mary French (1910–1997) and a fourth generation member of the Rockefeller family. Her paternal great-grandfather is Standard Oil's founder John D. Rockefeller and maternal great-grandfather is Frederick Billings, a president of Northern Pacific Railway.

== Biography ==
Weber is a philanthropist through her Flow Fund and is the founder and director of the Arts and Healing Network, which gives the prestigious "Most Outstanding Healing Artist for the Year" award annually. Weber is quoted as saying the "Arts and Healing Network honors and supports the emergence of healing artists and recognizes them as essential catalysts for positive change." She currently resides in the San Francisco Bay Area of California. In March 2010, Marion Rockefeller Weber discussed her approach to philanthropy through “flow funding,” a model that distributes grants through individuals who support grassroots initiatives and local communities.

== See also ==
- Rockefeller family
- Laurance Rockefeller
