= George Perkins Marsh Boyhood Home =

Historic estate in Woodstock, Vermont (US) managed by the National Park Service

- U.S. National Register of Historic Places
- U.S. National Historic Landmark
- U.S. Historic district – Contributing property
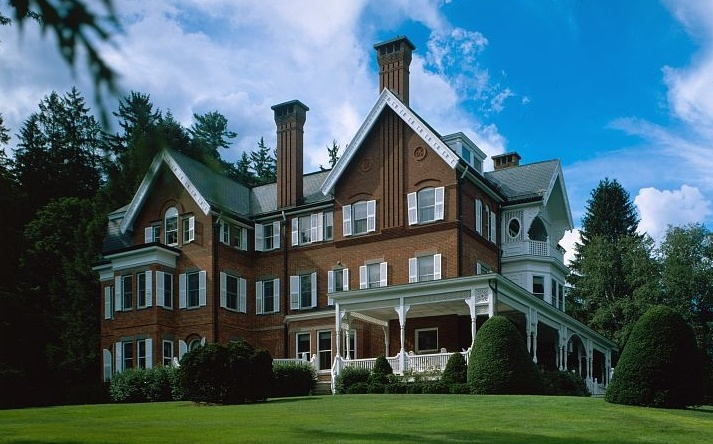
- Interactive map of George Perkins Marsh Boyhood Home
- Location: Marsh-Billings-Rockefeller National Historical Park, Woodstock, Vermont
- Area: 40 acres (16 ha)
- Built: 1805
- Architectural style: Queen Anne
- Part of: Marsh-Billings-Rockefeller National Historical Park (ID03000282)
- NRHP reference No.: 67000023

Significant dates
- Added to NRHP: June 11, 1967
- Designated NHL: June 11, 1967
- Designated CP: August 26, 1992

Marsh-Billings-Rockefeller National Historical Park
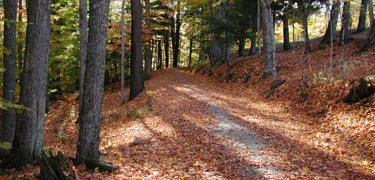
- Carriage road within the park
- Interactive map of Marsh-Billings-Rockefeller National Historical Park
- Location: Windsor County, Vermont, United States
- Nearest city: Woodstock, Vermont
- Coordinates: 43°37′52″N 72°31′46″W
- Area: 643 acres (260 ha)
- Established: August 26, 1992
- Visitors: 77,524 (in 2025)
- Governing body: National Park Service
- Website: Marsh-Billings-Rockefeller National Historical Park
- Interactive map

U.S. National Register of Historic Places
- Designated: August 26, 1992
- Reference no.: 03000282

The George Perkins Marsh Boyhood Home, also known as the Marsh-Billings House or Marsh-Billings-Rockefeller Mansion, is the architectural centerpiece of Marsh-Billings-Rockefeller National Historical Park, a National Historical Park in Woodstock, Vermont, United States. The house, built in 1805 and enlarged several times, is historically significant as the boyhood home of George Perkins Marsh (1801–1882), an early conservationist, and as the home later in the 19th century of Frederick H. Billings (1823–1890), a businessman and philanthropist who was a cofounder of the Northern Pacific Railroad. It is also architecturally significant as a high-quality example of Queen Anne architecture, alterations and enlargements commissioned by Billings and designed by Henry Hudson Holley. The house and its surrounding gardens were declared a National Historic Landmark in 1967. The 550-acre (220 ha) estate on which it stands was given by Mary French Rockefeller (the granddaughter of Frederick Billings) and Laurance Rockefeller to the people of the United States in 1992.

The park also preserves the site where Frederick Billings established a managed forest and a progressive dairy farm. The name honors Billings and the other owners of the property: George Perkins Marsh, Mary Montagu Billings French, Laurance Rockefeller, and Mary French Rockefeller. The Rockefellers transferred the property to the federal government in 1992. It is the only unit of the United States National Park System in Vermont (except for a portion of the Appalachian Trail). The park was honored in 2020 by being placed on Vermont's America the Beautiful quarter.

== Features and facilities ==
Marsh-Billings-Rockefeller National Historical Park is located just northwest of Woodstock village, on the west side of Vermont Route 12. Opposite it on the east side of the road stands Billings Farm & Museum, a working farm and heritage museum also on land originally belonging to the Billingses. Parking for both properties is located on the east side of VT 12, and National Park Service staff attend visitors at both the farm's visitor center, and one located on the park property. The area nearest the road is a landscaped area featuring the George Perkins Marsh Boyhood Home, the architectural centerpiece of the park and a National Historic Landmark. Although it was built in 1805, it underwent major alterations under Frederick Billings to achieve its present Late Victorian splendor. Visitors can take guided tours of the house (reservations recommended due to limited availability), which include displays of landscape paintings, including a significant collection of Hudson River School artists, highlighting the influence painting and photography had on the conservation movement. The gardens have also been restored.

Extending up the hillside to the west is a conservation landscape of more than 600 acres (240 ha), through which carriage roads and trails traverse a variety of ecosystems and landscapes. A pond is located near the center of the high valley, and there are several scenic viewpoints accessible from the trails. The property extends westward all the way to Prosper Road, where trailhead access is also provided to the western portions of the park.

== History ==
Charles Marsh, a prominent Vermont lawyer, built the core of the main house in 1805, as a fairly typical two-story five-bay Federal style house, and it is where he raised his family. His son George Perkins Marsh was born elsewhere in Woodstock in 1801, and grew up here before leaving for Dartmouth College when he was sixteen. The younger Marsh followed his father into both law and politics, winning election to Congress in 1834 as a Whig, and gaining appointment to diplomatic posts by Presidents John Tyler and Abraham Lincoln. Between the 1830s and 1860s he developed a philosophy of land stewardship which laid the foundation for the conservation movement in the United States with the 1864 publication of Man and Nature, or the Physical Geography as Modified by Human Behavior. This work, updated in 1874, gave a historical assessment of the decline of earlier societies because of a lack of stewardship, and made substantive calls for remedial actions to preserve the natural environment. Marsh died in 1882, never seeing his ideas fully realized.

The Marsh estate, then 246 acres (100 ha), was purchased in 1869 by Frederick H. Billings, a native of Royalton, Vermont who made a fortune as a lawyer dealing with land claims during the California Gold Rush, and was one of the founding partners of the Northern Pacific Railroad, serving as its president from 1873 to 1881. Between 1869 and 1881 Billings commissioned two significant enlargements and alterations to the house, the first adding a wing and a mansard roof, and the second, designed by Henry Hudson Holley, fully transforming the building into the elaborate Queen Anne Victorian it is today. Billings established what he considered to be a model farm on the property, which is now the adjacent Billings & Farm museum. Billings also constructed 14 miles (23 km) of carriage roads through the upland sections of the estate.

The next major owners of the property were Mary French Rockefeller (Billings' granddaughter) and her husband Laurance Rockefeller. The latter, an influential conservation advisor to several United States presidents, donated the house and upland properties to the people of the United States in 1992, the year the park was established. The house and a surrounding 40 acres (16 ha) of land were designated a National Historic Landmark and listed on the National Register of Historic Places in 1967 for their association with Marsh and Billings, and for the house's architecture, which was judged a particularly fine and imposing example of Queen Anne architecture. The house is open for guided tours between May and October; a fee is charged, and reservations may be made in advance, because tour size is limited.

== Awards ==
Marsh-Billings-Rockefeller National Historical Park was awarded the first Forest Stewardship Council (FSC) certification of a United States national park by the Rainforest Alliance's SmartWood program in August 2005. This certification made Marsh-Billings-Rockefeller only the second United States federal land to receive such certification for sustainable forest management.

== See also ==
- First Congregational Church of Woodstock, Vermont
- F. H. Gillingham & Sons
- Franklin S. Billings
- List of National Historic Landmarks in Vermont
- National Register of Historic Places listings in Windsor County, Vermont
