= Frederick H. Billings =

American attorney, businessman and politician

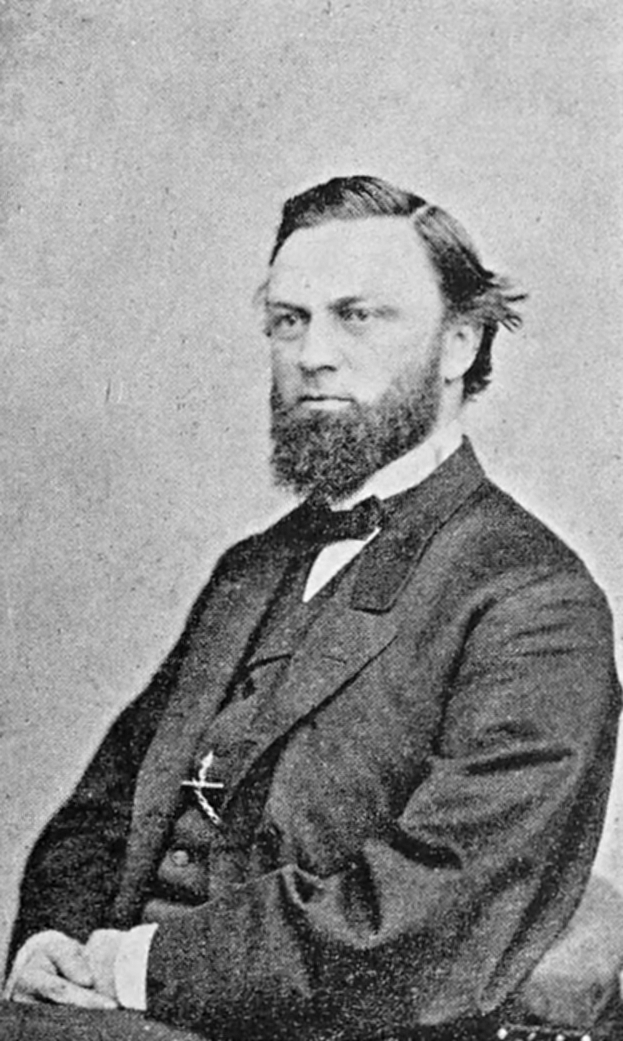
- Born: September 27, 1823; Royalton, Vermont, U.S.
- Died: September 30, 1890 (aged 67); Woodstock, Vermont, U.S.
- Resting place: River Street Cemetery, Woodstock, Vermont
- Education: University of Vermont
- Occupations: Lawyer; Businessman
- Known for: President of the Northern Pacific Railway
- Spouse: Julia Parmly
- Children: 7 (including Mary Billings French)
- Relatives: Franklin Noble Billings (brother); Franklin S. Billings (nephew); Franklin S. Billings Jr. (grand-nephew); Mary French Rockefeller (grand-daughter)

Frederick H. Billings (September 27, 1823 – September 30, 1890) was an American lawyer, financier, and politician. He is known for his legal work on land claims during the early years of California's statehood and his presidency of the Northern Pacific Railway from 1879 to 1881.

A native of Royalton, Vermont, Billings graduated from the University of Vermont in 1844, became an attorney, and moved to California during the 1848 California Gold Rush. He took part in the creation of a prominent law firm that handled land title cases, which were an important issue because California had been under the jurisdiction of several governments. Billings also took part in several business ventures that proved successful, and became a millionaire by the age of 30. At the start of the American Civil War, he worked diligently to keep California from seceding.

After returning to Vermont in the mid 1860s, Billings continued to practice law and take part in business ventures. He served on the boards of directors of several corporations, and was a major investor in the Northern Pacific Railway. Billings received credit for rescuing the NP after the Panic of 1873, and served as its president from 1879 to 1881. He resigned the presidency after a hostile takeover, but remained on the board of directors and saw construction of the railroad through to completion in 1883.

Billings took part in politics as a Republican. He was a candidate for governor of Vermont in 1872, and nearly won the party's nomination. He was also a delegate to the Republican National Conventions of 1880 and 1884, where he supported George F. Edmunds for president. Billings donated millions of dollars to numerous causes and organizations, including schools, colleges, libraries, and churches.

After suffering a stroke in 1889, Billings' health deteriorated, and he died at his Woodstock, Vermont home on September 23, 1890. His body was buried at River Street Cemetery in Woodstock.

== Early life ==
Billings was born in Royalton, Vermont on September 27, 1823, to Oel Billings and Sarah (Wetherbe) Billings. When he was 12, his family relocated to Woodstock, and Billings attended the schools of Royalton and Woodstock. He began attendance at Meriden, New Hampshire's Kimball Union Academy in 1839. In 1844, he graduated from the University of Vermont (UVM) with an A.M. degree. In June 1890, UVM awarded Billings the honorary degree of LL.D.

Originally a Whig and later a Republican, from 1846 to 1848 he served as Secretary of Civil and Military Affairs (chief assistant) to Horace Eaton, the governor of Vermont. He studied law with Oliver P. Chandler and attained admission to the bar in 1848.

== Career ==
=== Move to California ===
Billings moved to San Francisco during the California Gold Rush of 1848, where he became the city's first land claims lawyer. One of his first clients was John Sutter. A friend Billings made on the trip introduced him to Bennet C. Riley, who served as the last military governor before California achieved statehood in 1850. Riley was favorably impressed with Billings' abilities, and appointed him San Francisco's commissioner of deeds, chairman of the city's board of inspectors and judges, and territorial attorney general. Billings also took part in several business activities. Upon arrival in California, he bought an old canal boat, then made a profit by quickly reselling its timbers. With this stake, he invested in other profitable ventures, including "water lots" -- property which was under the water of San Francisco Bay but was intended for reclamation and development.

Billings partnered with Henry Halleck, Archibald C. Peachy, and Trenor W. Park in Halleck, Peachy & Billings, which became a leading law firm in San Francisco. HPB took part in two important land ownership cases, which were complex because California had been part of Mexico, so land titles were in dispute. In the first, ownership of the New Almaden quicksilver mine, Billings undertook a risky 1859 trip to Mexico City in search of documents and witnesses at a time when the city was besieged by the forces of President Benito Juárez as Juárez attempted to reclaim control of Mexico's government. HPB lost the case despite Billings receiving praise for producing what legal observers called the most extensive and detailed research they had seen for a single land case. In the second, HPB attempted to defend the Rancho Las Mariposas claim of John C. Frémont. So many gold miners had occupied the land by the time Frémont attempted to assert his ownership that he was unable to take possession. Despite the setback, Billings and Frémont continued to work together on business opportunities including real estate and mining.

Among the other ventures in which Billings had an interest was the Overland Stage Company, of which he was an early promoter, and the Atlantic and Pacific Railroad, which later became the Texas and Pacific Railway. By age 30, Billings was a millionaire from his legal fees, increases in real estate values, and profits from his other enterprises, including part ownership of San Francisco's Montgomery Block, the largest office building west of St. Louis at its 1853 opening.

During his years in San Francisco, Billings also developed a reputation for philanthropy, including donations for churches, schools, and parks. Billings was an early advocate for the conservation of Yosemite Valley for the use of future generations. He was also a trustee of the College of California (later, the University of California at Berkeley) and it was Billings who suggested that the college be named for George Berkeley.

=== American Civil War ===
During the late 1850s, as the United States drew closer to conflict over the slavery issue, Billings spoke tirelessly against California secession, successfully opposing a pro-slavery faction led by Democrats including William Gwin. He subsequently embarked on several trips to Europe in an unsuccessful effort to sell Frémont's Mariposa mine shares. At the start of the American Civil War, Billings acted as Frémont's agent when Frémont took the initiative to purchase arms in England for use by Union troops.

Upon returning to the United States in 1861, Billings met Julia Parmly in New York City. They decided to wed soon after meeting, and Billings returned to California to wind down the law firm's business and sell some of his properties before returning to New York City to get married. Billings then returned to San Francisco; in September 1862, he was a featured speaker at a San Francisco rally to raise money for the care of sick and wounded soldiers. In October 1863, Billings was the featured speaker at a San Francisco event held to celebrate recent Union military victories. In November 1863, Billings defended several individuals who attempted to steal a schooner from San Francisco Bay, which was the first step in their plan to seize a steamship and become pro-Confederate privateers. They were convicted, but Billings succeeded in saving them from the death penalty. In December 1863, Billings left San Francisco and settled in New York City.

In 1864, California changed from electing members of the United States House of Representatives to at-large seats to electing them by Congressional district. Even though he had moved away, his pro-Union record led Republican supporters of Billings to support him for the party's nomination in the 1st District, which included San Francisco. Donald C. McRuer was able to obtain the nomination, and went on to win the seat. Later in 1864, California Republicans wrote to President Abraham Lincoln and suggested the state was entitled to be represented in Lincoln's cabinet because California had supported Lincoln's reelection. They recommended Billings for an appointment and implied that Secretary of the Interior would be a suitable position. After Lincoln's assassination, California Republicans urged his successor Andrew Johnson to make the appointment. Among other complications, Billings suffered from an extended illness that prevented him from advocating on his own behalf, and he was not nominated.

=== Return to Vermont ===
In 1864, Billings left New York City and returned to Woodstock, where he practiced law and resumed his business interests. In late 1865, friends of Billings proposed him as a candidate for the United States Senate from California, but the nomination went to Cornelius Cole, who went on to win the seat. In 1868, Billings was an original incorporator of the New England Telegraph Company, which was chartered by the state to construct a telegraph line connecting northern and southern Vermont, and connecting Vermont to adjacent states. In 1869, he purchased George Perkins Marsh's former estate. Billings had read Marsh's pioneering volume on ecology called Man and Nature, and set about to put into practice his theories on conservation. Billings and his heirs purchased many failing farms and reforested much of the surrounding hillsides. This eventually led to creation of the Marsh-Billings-Rockefeller National Historical Park, which oversees and interprets what is probably the oldest managed forest in the United States. In addition, Billings' early conservation efforts led to creation of the Billings Farm and Museum, an important resource for learning about Vermont's agricultural history.

While residing in Woodstock, Billings maintained a home in New York City so he could tend to his business interests. These included chairman of the executive committee for a corporation that planned to build a cross-isthmus canal in Nicaragua, and member of the board of directors of the Delaware and Hudson Canal Company. His additional directorships included several New England regional railroads, the Farmers' Loan and Trust Company, American Exchange Bank, and the Manhattan Life Insurance Company. In 1869, he was elected president of the Woodstock National Bank. In 1871, he was elected a director of the National Life Insurance Company.

Billings was also involved in civic and charitable activities, including serving on the University of Vermont's board of trustees from 1867 to 1873. Also in 1869, Billings was one of two prominent Vermonters who paid the expenses for two Vermont schoolteachers, enabling them to provide instruction in southern states for former slaves as part of the post-Civil War Reconstruction. In 1870, Billings was elected president of the Vermont Bible Society. In 1871, he was chosen for the presidency of the Windsor County Agricultural Society. Billings also advocated for the creation of the Vermont Veterans' Home to care for former Civil War soldiers. When the Vermont General Assembly passed a bill incorporating the home in 1884, Billings was selected as an original member of its board of trustees.

=== Northern Pacific Railway ===
In 1869, Billings purchased from Hiram Walbridge a one-twelfth interest in the Northern Pacific Railway. He served on the board of directors beginning in 1870. Construction began in 1870, with the NP planned to run from Brainerd, Minnesota to Seattle, Washington.

Billings became the largest landholder in the area that became Billings, Montana, which was named for him. His Montana business interests expanded to include banks, mines, ranches, and local railroads that connected to the Northern Pacific. Billings also played a significant role in promoting the conservation of the area that became Yellowstone National Park, a site which was near the route of the Northern Pacific.

As chairman of the NP's land committee, Billings was credited with overseeing development and execution of plans for using the Northern Pacific to transport white settlers to Minnesota and the Dakota Territory. When Jay Cooke & Company, which was responsible for the sale of NP stock, failed in the Panic of 1873, Billings worked to rescue the railway and succeeded in saving it after bankruptcy. As a result of his efforts, after the panic began to abate, the Northern Pacific was able to restart construction. In 1879, Billings became the company's president. He served until 1881, when Henry Villard, proponent of an alternate route to the Pacific coast, purchased a controlling interest in the Northern Pacific. Billings left the company's presidency while remaining on the board of directors, and he was present for the ceremony in Montana that commemorated the end of construction in 1883.

=== Politics ===
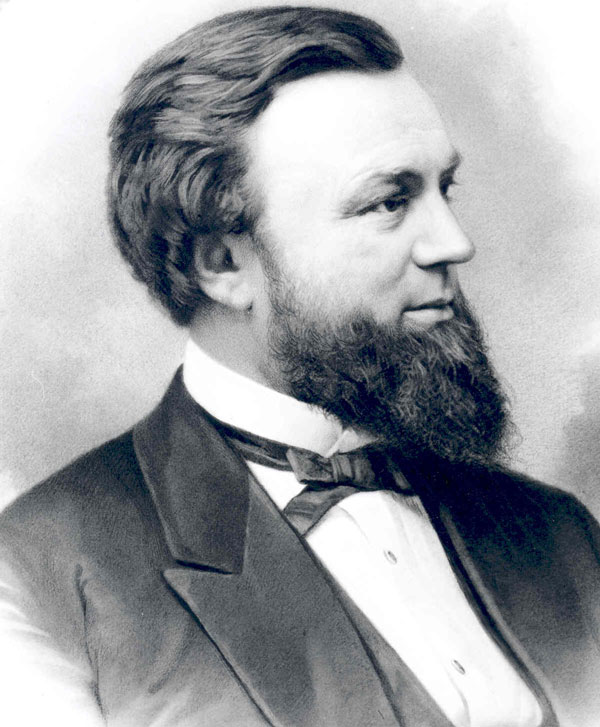
1873 charcoal portrait by William Kurtz

Billings maintained an interest in Republican politics. In early 1868, a group of his friends in California attempted to mount a campaign to obtain the party's vice presidential nomination for Billings, but this effort proved unsuccessful. In November 1868, he made a well received speech at a party campaign rally in Barnard, Vermont. Billings was mentioned as a candidate for governor in 1869, but disclaimed any interest. His name was again prominently mentioned in 1870, but Billings deferred to John Wolcott Stewart, who won the nomination and the general election.

In 1872 Billings was a candidate for the Republican nomination for Governor of Vermont. The Republican nomination was then tantamount to election, and Billings was president of the state Republican convention and had a large group of delegates pledged to him. Governor Stewart also had a strong following, but his opponents argued that re-nominating him would violate the party's "Mountain Rule", which prior to Stewart's election to a two-year term had limited governors to two one-year terms. Delegates decided that the Mountain Rule would limit Stewart and his successors to one two-year term, and the Billings and Stewart delegates compromised on the governorship by nominating Julius Converse even though he was not an active candidate.

In 1876, Billings was again proposed as a candidate for the governorship, and again disclaimed any interest. Later that year, he took part in the Fifth Avenue Conference, a meeting organized by Carl Schurz for Republicans opposed to the perceived corruption of the Ulysses S. Grant administration and in favor of progressive measures including civil service reform. When the party nominated presidential and vice presidential candidates not connected to Grant, Rutherford B. Hayes and William A. Wheeler, Billings publicly expressed satisfaction with the ticket, though illness prevented him from actively campaigning for it.

In 1880, Billings was a delegate to the Republican National Convention, and made the nominating speech for presidential candidate George F. Edmunds, a U.S. Senator from Vermont, but the nomination went to James A. Garfield. Billings was a delegate again in 1884, and again supported Edmunds for president, but the nomination eventually went to James G. Blaine.

== Death and burial ==
In December 1889, Billings suffered a stroke that left him partially paralyzed. His health rapidly declined, and Billings died in Woodstock on September 30, 1890. Among the prominent attendees at his funeral were Torrey E. Wales, George Grenville Benedict, Percival W. Clement, William Wells, and Charles A. Prouty. The bearers included James Barrett and Oliver P. Chandler. Billings was buried at River Street Cemetery in Woodstock.

== Family ==
In 1862, Billings married Julia Parmly (December 3, 1835 - February 17, 1914), the daughter of Dr. Eleazer Parmly, a prominent New York City oral surgeon. They were the parents of seven children:

- Parmly Billings (February 6, 1863 – May 7, 1888)
- Laura Billings (Mrs. Frederic Schiller Lee) (August 20, 1864 – November 5, 1938)
- Frederick Billings (December 23, 1866 – May 5, 1913)
- Mary Montagu Billings (March 6, 1869 – June 14, 1951)
- Elizabeth Billings (January 3, 1871 – September 10, 1944)
- Ehrick Billings (October 17, 1872 – October 17, 1889)
- Richard Billings (January 31, 1875 – December 3, 1931)

He was the grandfather of Mary French Rockefeller, wife of Laurance Rockefeller.

Billings was the brother of Franklin Noble Billings. He was the uncle of Governor Franklin S. Billings and grand-uncle of Judge Franklin S. Billings Jr.

== Philanthropy ==
Billings provided $40,000 to construct a chapel for the Congregational Church of Woodstock. Although he never owned a home in Billings, Montana, a railroad town established in 1882 and named after him, his wife provided the money to build its First Congregational Church. Frederick Billings endowed the Billings Library, completed in 1885 for the University of Vermont, and purchased the George Perkins Marsh collection of 12,000 volumes for it.

Additional Billings gifts included $50,000 to endow a professorship at Amherst College in memory of his son Parmly, who was an Amherst graduate. He also donated $50,000 to Dwight Lyman Moody's Mount Hermon School for Boys in memory of his son Ehrick. Billings also donated money to Whitman College to enable the construction of the college's Billings Hall as a memorial to Ehrick and Parmly Billings. In 1908, Julia Billings provided an endowment which enabled creation of Whitman's Frederick Billings Professorship of Biblical Literature.

Billings' son Frederick Jr. provided a donation to Billings, Montana which financed construction of the Parmly Billings Memorial Library. Billings' daughter Elizabeth later provided additional funding, which was used to complete an addition to the original library.

== Legacy ==
- Billings, Montana
- Billings, Missouri
- Marsh-Billings-Rockefeller National Historical Park
- Billings Library, University of Vermont, Burlington, Vermont
- Billings Farm & Museum, Woodstock, Vermont
- Camp Billings, Fairlee, Vermont
- Billings County, North Dakota
- In World War II, the United States Liberty ship SS Frederick Billings was named in his honor.

== Related ==
- Franklin S. Billings
- F. H. Gillingham & Sons
- Woodstock, Vermont

== Sources ==
- Yellowstone Genealogy Forum: Frederick Billings Biography
- UVM Gift Societies and Clubs: Frederick Billings Society
- Marsh-Billings-Rockefeller National Historic Park
- Biographical Sketch

Business positions
Preceded by Charles Barstow Wright	President of Northern Pacific Railway; 1879 – 1881	Succeeded by Henry Villard
