= Abby Aldrich Rockefeller =

American socialite and philanthropist (1874–1948)

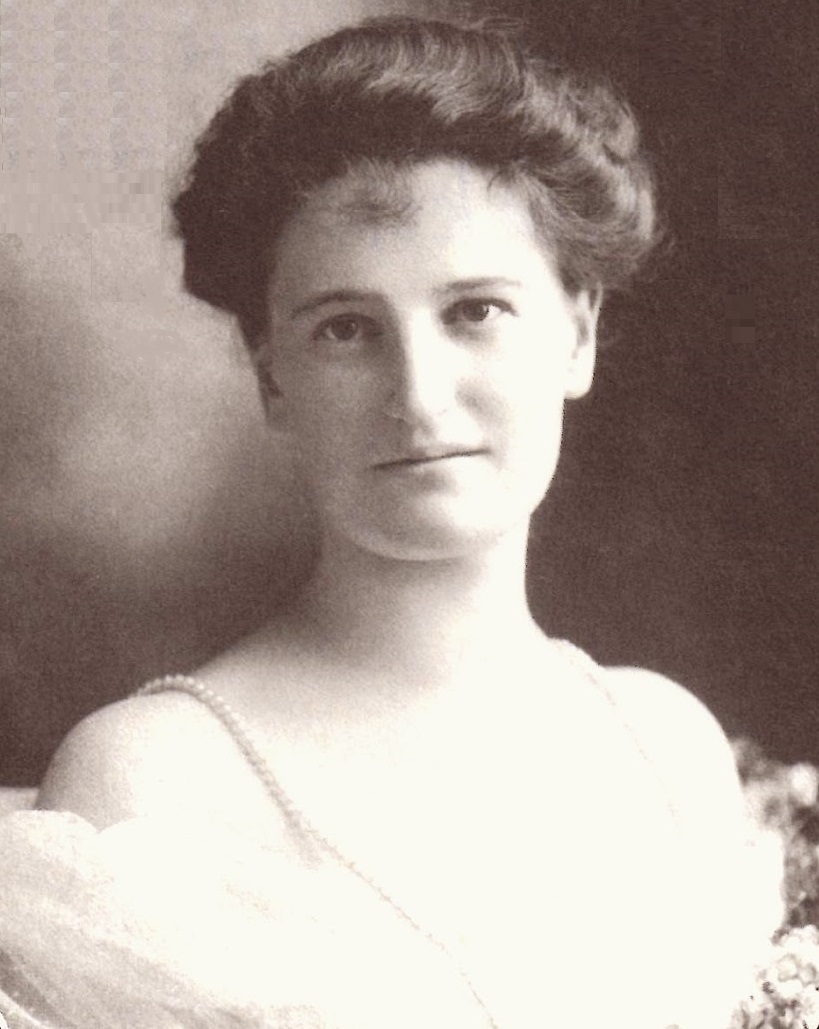
- Abby Aldrich in 1893
- Born: Abigail Greene Aldrich; October 26, 1874; Providence, Rhode Island, U.S.
- Died: April 5, 1948 (aged 73); New York City, U.S.
- Education: Miss Abbott's School for Young Ladies
- Occupation: Philanthropist
- Spouse: John Davison Rockefeller Jr. (m. 1901)
- Children: Abigail; John III; Nelson; Laurance; Winthrop; David
- Parent(s): Nelson Wilmarth Aldrich; Abigail Pearce Truman Chapman
- Relatives: Lucy Truman Aldrich (sister); Richard Steere Aldrich (brother); Winthrop Williams Aldrich (brother)

Abigail Greene Aldrich Rockefeller (October 26, 1874 – April 5, 1948) was an American socialite and philanthropist. She was a prominent member of the Rockefeller family through her marriage to financier and philanthropist John D. Rockefeller Jr., the son of Standard Oil co-founder John D. Rockefeller Sr. Her father was Nelson W. Aldrich, who served as a senator from Rhode Island. Rockefeller was known for being the driving force behind the establishment of the Museum of Modern Art. She was the mother of Nelson Rockefeller, who served from 1974 to 1977 as the 41st vice president of the United States.

== Early life ==
Abigail Greene Aldrich was born in Providence, Rhode Island, as the fourth child of Senator Nelson Wilmarth Aldrich and Abigail Pearce Truman Chapman. The majority of her childhood was divided between Providence and Warwick Neck (in Rhode Island), and Washington, D.C.

Owing to her father's prominence as a congressman, Rockefeller was introduced at an early age to elevated political circles. The figures that her parents entertained included Senator Eugene Hale, Senator William P. Frye, General Ambrose Burnside, and Elizabeth Bacon Custer.

Her early education came at the hands of Quaker governesses. From 1891 to 1893, she was enrolled at Miss Abbott's School for Young Ladies in Providence, Rhode Island. There she studied English composition and literature, French, German, art history, ancient history, gymnastics, and dancing. In November 1893 she made her social debut at her coming-out party, which sparked her lifelong love of social events.

On June 30, 1894, on a trip fostered by her father, Rockefeller sailed to Liverpool, beginning a lifetime of extensive European and later Asian travel. Her initial four-month sojourn included stops in England, Belgium, the Netherlands, Germany, Austria, Switzerland, Italy, and France. This and future trips featured visits to numerous art galleries, informing her future discernment as an art collector.

== Marriage to John D. Rockefeller Jr. ==
In late 1894, she met John Davison Rockefeller Jr., the only son of Standard Oil co-founder John Davison Rockefeller Sr. and schoolteacher Laura Celestia "Cettie" Spelman, at a friend's house in Providence. Their long courtship is documented in her engagement books, which were used to formally detail her meetings with potential suitors. In early 1895, they began to share walks together on Sunday afternoons. These meetings progressed further until late August 1901, when they became engaged. They married on October 9, 1901, in the major society wedding of the Gilded Age, in front of around a thousand of the elite personages of the time, at her father's summer home, "Indian Oaks", in Warwick Neck, Kent County, Rhode Island.

The couple settled in at 13 West 54th Street in Manhattan from 1901 until 1913, when her husband finished constructing a nine-story mansion at 10 West 54th Street, the largest in New York City at the time. They resided at "Number 10" until 1938 when they moved to a 40-room triplex apartment at 740 Park Avenue. Both of them also owned properties in Pocantico Hills, New York, Seal Harbor, Maine, and Williamsburg, Virginia. They became the parents of six children: Abby Rockefeller Mauzé, John D. Rockefeller III, Nelson Rockefeller, Laurance Rockefeller, Winthrop Rockefeller, and David Rockefeller.

== Death ==
Abby Rockefeller suffered a heart attack and died on April 5, 1948, at the Rockefeller family home at 740 Park Avenue in New York City, at the age of 73. She was cremated and her ashes were spread at a private burial place in Pocantico Hills, New York. A memorial service was held for her at the Riverside Church.

Her will was filed for probate on April 22, 1948, and her gross estate was appraised at $1,156,269. As per her final wishes, four major works were bequeathed to the Museum of Modern Art (MoMA): Lady With a Parasol and Seated Woman, both by Georges Seurat; Street at Saintes-Maries and Corridor at Saint-Remy by Vincent van Gogh. She left her Oriental miniatures to the Fogg Museum. Her residuary estate of $850,848, minus estate taxes of $250,000, was donated to the MoMA.

A number of dedications were made in her honor and in remembrance of her commitment as an art collector. One such was the Abby Aldrich Rockefeller Print Room at the MoMA, which with her gift of sixteen hundred prints was opened on May 15, 1949. The Abby Aldrich Rockefeller Folk Art Center was opened in 1957 in Colonial Williamsburg to house her collection of folk art.

A number of prominent figures paid homage to Rockefeller after her death. Artist Henri Matisse contributed a stained glass window for the Union Church in Pocantico Hills. In the spring of 1954, at eighty-four years old, the then-bedridden Matisse was asked to design a stained glass window for the Union Church as a memorial to Rockefeller. He regretfully refused the commission because his deteriorating health would prevent him from visiting and studying the location. After Nelson Rockefeller sent him a series of photographs of the location, Matisse changed his mind and began to work on the project. On November 1, 1954, he wrote that he had happily completed the work, and he died two days later.

== Patronage of modern art and contributions to the Museum of Modern Art ==
=== Patron of art ===
Abby Rockefeller began collecting paintings, watercolors, and drawings by a number of contemporary American artists in 1925, as well as a number of European modernists: Vincent van Gogh, Edgar Degas, Henri Matisse, Pablo Picasso, Paul Cézanne, and Henri de Toulouse-Lautrec. She became a prominent patron of art.

In 1928, she employed Donald Deskey to create a series of furnished rooms, done in the art deco style, for the Rockefeller home. These rooms were dubbed the Topside Gallery, and served as a display area for Rockefeller's growing art collection. The art in the room was regularly cycled, forming curated exhibitions of Rockefeller's modern and folk art collections. Visitors to the gallery rode an elevator to the 7th floor of the Rockefeller home, keeping the gallery separate, though connected, from private family areas. The news of her interests and activities spread quickly from this period, and many subsequent collectors began to follow her lead.

=== Co-founder of Museum of Modern Art (MoMA) ===
Lillie P. Bliss, Mary Quinn Sullivan, and Rockefeller joined to conceptualize what is now known as the Museum of Modern Art (MoMA) in New York. Quickly, they gathered the support of other prominent figures including: Anson Goodyear, Murray Crane, and Paul J. Sachs. The founding board consisted of seven members, with Goodyear as the president. The first quarters for the museum were rented at 730 Fifth Avenue in New York and Alfred H. Barr Jr. was appointed as the museum's first director.

Since her husband only gave her a relatively small allowance, she could not solely rely on him to finance the new museum. His financial support was especially limited due to his personal distaste for modern art. Thus, financing for the museum and acquisition of paintings came from Rockefeller's solicitation of the public, corporations, and prominent New York residents.

Rockefeller was elected to MoMA's board of trustees in October 1929 and served as inaugural treasurer from 1929 until 1934. Her other roles included terms as First Vice-president from 1934 until 1936, and First Vice-chairman from 1941 to 1945. Her son Nelson Rockefeller was involved in the museum alongside her, starting out as chairman of the junior advisory committee and rising to president.

Chief among Rockefeller's concerns at the new museum was the strength of the permanent collection. She often privately gave her own money to the museum for the purchase of new acquisitions. In 1938, she granted the museum its first purchase fund, which was handsomely increased by Nelson Rockefeller.

Many ideas concerning the development of the museum originated with Rockefeller. For example, it was Rockefeller who campaigned for the creation of the museum's film library. Also, it was Rockefeller's idea to create the War Veterans' Art Center. This center aimed to rehabilitate veterans of World War II through the practice of art. Stephen Clark was her co-sponsor on the project, Kenneth Chorley was the supervisor of the center's activities, and Victor D'Amico was the supervisor of activities. The center served 1485 veterans until it was closed in June 1948, in an effort to rejoin veteran artists with civilian artists at the People's Art Center.

Rockefeller's legacy at the museum is preserved in the form of a number of dedications including the Abby Aldrich Rockefeller Print Room, which opened in 1949, after her death. The room houses Rockefeller's gift of 1600 prints, which had been given nine years earlier. The Abby Aldrich Rockefeller Sculpture Garden was also named in her honor. The garden was designed by architect Philip Johnson and opened in 1953.

== Patronage of folk art and contributions to Abby Aldrich Museum of Folk Art ==
=== Patron of folk art ===
In 1929, Rockefeller became an early customer of the Downtown Gallery, run by art dealer, Edith Halpert. Halpert was selling 19th-century pictures and weathervanes that had been gathered from New England. The timing was perfect for Rockefeller because she and her husband has just began contributing to restoration works at what is now known as Colonial Williamsburg. Her years of collecting spanned from the late 1920s to 1942.

Her collection included: paintings, weathervanes, shop signs, pottery, quilts, and other decorative household items. Some of her favorite types of items in her collection were: children's portraits and student art, in the form of calligraphy, memorials, and theorems.

The original pieces of the collection were largely sourced from New England and Pennsylvania, though later it included Virginia, North Carolina, South Carolina, and Georgia.

Rockefeller's collection grew with the help of Holger Cahill and Edith Halpert. Outside of the employment of these two curators, most of the items in the collection were discovered in their places of origin. For example, in 1934, Cahill was sent by Rockefeller to the southern United States to personally gather new items for the collection. On this trip, Cahill found items in people's sitting rooms, attics, and carpenter's shops. In Orangeburg, South Carolina, Cahill found one of Rockefeller's most important acquisitions, a watercolor titled The Old Plantation.

A portion of Rockefeller's collection was purchased from Elie Nadelman, who had lost his fortune to the Great Depression. Nadelman's folk art collection purchased and split amongst Rockefeller, Henry Francis du Pont, the Cloisters of the Metropolitan Museum of Art, and the Brummer Galleries.

=== Early exhibitions of the collection ===
In 1930 and 1931, the Newark Museum exhibited a collection of American folk art. Approximately 10 percent of these items were attributed to the same anonymous donor, in actuality the donor was Abby Rockefeller.

In 1932, Rockefeller's collection was again loaned anonymously, this time to the Museum of Modern Art for an exhibition titled American Folk Art: The Art of the Common Man in America. Of the 175 objects on display, 174 of the objects belonged to Rockefeller, with the remaining single object belonging to Henry Cahill. The exhibition was highly successful, and became the first traveling exhibition of American folk art, visiting six American cities from 1932 to 1934.

The objects displayed during these two early exhibitions were mostly from New England and Pennsylvania and constituted a wide range of art categories including: oil paintings, pastels, watercolors, paintings on velvet, paintings on glass, wood sculptures, metal sculptures, and chalkware.

=== Development of the Abby Aldrich Rockefeller Folk Art Museum ===
In 1934, Rockefeller began to lend parts of her collection for permanent display in the Ludwell-Paradis House in Colonial Williamsburg. The exhibits were installed mostly under the guidance of Edith Halpert and opened to the public in 1935, remaining open until January 1956. Other pieces were hung in Colonial Williamsburg in neighboring exhibition buildings or operating taverns, blending in with the existing decor.

In 1939, fifty-four pieces of the folk art collection were donated to the Museum of Modern Art.

In 1954, six years after Abby Rockefeller's death, the March edition of Antiques magazine published an announcement that a new museum would house the Rockefeller folk art collection. John D. Rockefeller Jr. provided the funds for construction of the project and the purchase of new objects. This endowment was so large that the museum was able to acquire over a hundred new objects in its first year.

== Philanthropy ==
=== Young Women's Christian Association (YWCA) ===
John D. Rockefeller Jr.'s wedding gift to Abby was a sum of money, which she promptly donated to the Young Women's Christian Association (YWCA) of Providence in Rhode Island. Later, she was active in the YWCA of New York.

From 1918 to 1936 she held active service in the YWCA, though upon her retirement from leadership roles, she was considered an honorary member. She was a member of the YWCA's National Board, and served as the vice-president and chairman of numerous committees. Notably, in 1918 she was elected as chairman of the Housing Committee of the War Work Council. The committee was organized during World War I with the objective of providing improved living conditions for working women. For example, she recruited the architect Duncan Candler to design a house in Charleston, South Carolina to house women who worked at a naval uniform factory.

Rockefeller was director of the YWCA operated and owned Grace Dodge Hotel in Washington D.C., which was constructed in October 1921. Rockefeller monitored financial reports and oversaw advertisements for the hotel, with the primary goal of serving female workers. She objected to racial discrimination in the wages, status, and living arrangements of the staff at the Grace Dodge Hotel.

=== Good Fellowship Council ===
Via the Fifth Avenue Baptist Church, the Good Fellowship Council was formed, inviting all people of the local neighborhood to join. The meetings aimed to open discussion on neighborhood problems including: traffic lights, sanitation, schools, and child welfare. Originally the club was organized for women, but later allowed men to join as well.

Abby Rockefeller served as the chairman of the Good Fellowship Council and led monthly meetings while visiting a range of community sub-clubs. The meetings were attended by 300 to 400 people.

The meetings featured many guest speakers, including the President of the American Federation of Labor, doctors specializing in child care, experts in immigration law, and architects specializing in commercial spaces. Musical performances given in native languages and forms of dress were given by members of the club regularly.

=== Bayway Community Cottage ===
In October 1920, Rockefeller desired to create a demonstration structure for the employees of the Bayway Refinery of Standard Oil, in Elizabeth, New Jersey. The structure was meant to be an example of a worker's home, though soon the purpose of the cottage extended to one of community learning. The cottage hosted cooking classes, a Mothers' Club, and a baby clinic. In 1926, the cottage was expanded to include a club-room, larger kitchen, larger baby clinic, gymnasium, and office for social workers. In 1939, another addition created a bowling alley and other game rooms. In 1947, 9700 people made use of the Bayway Community Cottage in some way.

=== International House of New York ===
Abby Rockefeller was the chairman of the Furnishing Committee of the International House of New York. As chairman, she strove to add American decor to the interior of the building, drawing largely on her childhood in Providence, Rhode Island for inspiration. For twenty-five years she was a regular visitor to the International House, and for many years she and her husband hosted Christmas parties for its residents.

=== Colonial Williamsburg ===
In the mid-1920s, Abby and her husband were contacted by Reverend Dr. W.A.R. Goodwin, who was rector of Bruton Parish Church and an instructor at the College of William and Mary in Williamsburg, Virginia. After seeing Dr. Goodwin's restored church, they explored further his concept of a massive restoration of the city to its glory days prior to the American Revolution, as the capital of the Virginia Colony. They became committed to funding the project, which commenced in 1927.

The result was Colonial Williamsburg, a living history museum which has become one of the most popular tourist attractions in the world. One of the museums within the complex, the Abby Aldrich Rockefeller Folk Art Museum, is named in her honor.

== See also ==
- Colonial Williamsburg
- Rockefeller family
- John D. Rockefeller Jr.
- Nelson W. Aldrich
