= South Woodstock, Vermont =

Census-designated place in Vermont, United States

- Census-designated place
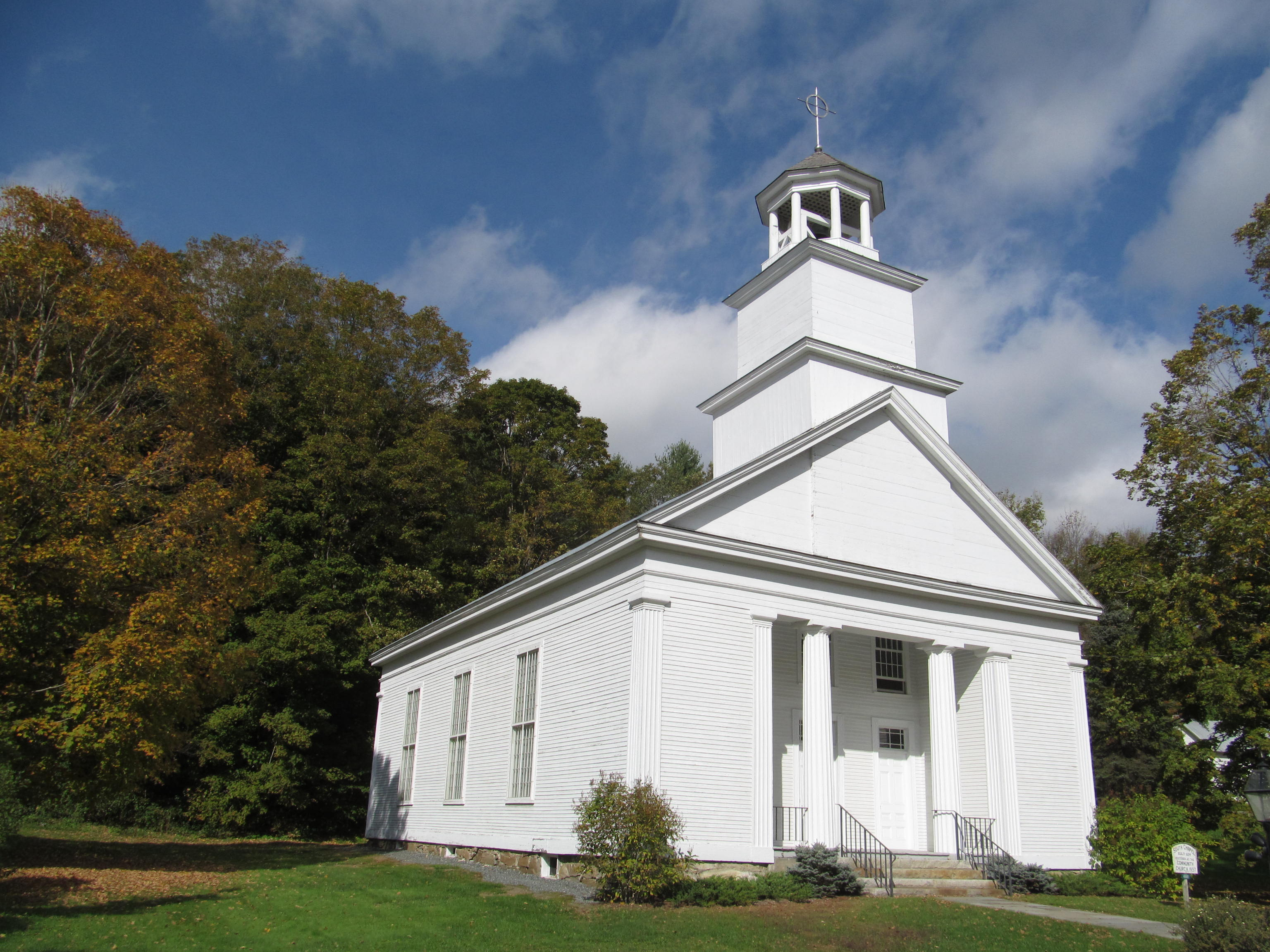
- Church in South Woodstock

- Location within Vermont Location within the United States
- Coordinates: 43°33′39″N 72°31′55″W
- Country: United States
- State: Vermont
- County: Windsor
- Town: Woodstock

Area
  - Total: 0.92 sq mi (2.39 km^{2})
  - Land: 0.92 sq mi (2.38 km^{2})
  - Water: 0.0039 sq mi (0.01 km^{2})
- Elevation: 1,056 ft (322 m)
- Time zone: UTC-5 (Eastern (EST))
  - Summer (DST): UTC-4 (EDT)
- ZIP Codes: 05071 (South Woodstock); 05091 (Woodstock)
- Area code: 802
- GNIS feature ID: 2807170

South Woodstock is an unincorporated village and census-designated place (CDP) in the town of Woodstock in Windsor County, Vermont, United States. It is in the Kedron Valley. As of the 2020 census, South Woodstock had a population of 109.

A post office was established in South Woodstock in 1828; today, its ZIP code is 05071. The ZCTA for ZIP Code 05071 includes large areas outside the village district and includes the entire southern portion of the town of Woodstock.

Once a center of sheep husbandry, South Woodstock is split between commercial and residential areas. Beside the post office, public services in the community include a volunteer fire department; moreover, Woodstock maintains a local police department.

The South Woodstock Village Historic District was listed on the National Register of Historic Places in 1983. The historic district consists of 44 contributing and 11 non-contributing properties over an area of 360 acres (150 ha), including a significant concentration of brick buildings. The district includes examples of Greek Revival and Federal architecture from before the American Civil War. Notable buildings include an 1825 school that became a Grange Hall, the South Chapel (1839), and the Perkins Academy (1848).

== History ==
The South Woodstock area was originally settled in the 1770s, with rural agricultural homesteads on local hilltops. The village, located in a valley, grew around the gristmills of the Cottle brothers, eventually providing a broader array of services to the outlying farmers. The Cottles built several fine Federal period brick houses in the village, while the Ransom family built and operated shops in the village. The village's early 19th century character has been maintained in part because it remained away from economically important railroad transport, which affected the local economy until road transport became more common in the 20th century.

== See also ==
- National Register of Historic Places listings in Windsor County, Vermont
