= David Sumner House =

Historic house in Vermont, United States

- U.S. National Register of Historic Places
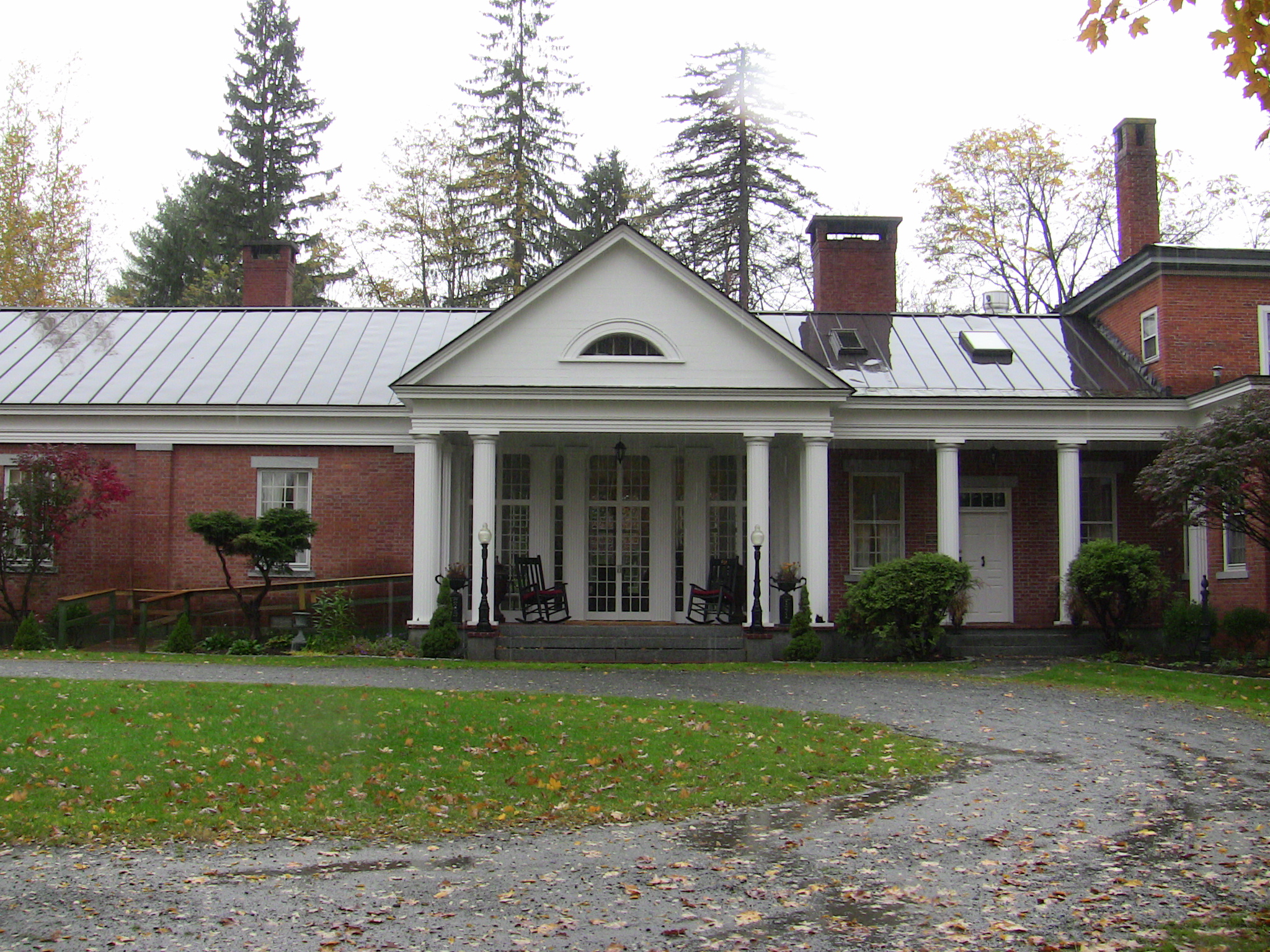

- Location within Vermont Location within the United States
- Location: 4 Station Rd., Hartland, Vermont
- Coordinates: 43°32′24″N 72°23′56″W
- Area: 6 acres (2.4 ha)
- Built: 1811
- Architectural style: Federal
- NRHP reference No.: 89000027
- Added to NRHP: March 2, 1989

The David Sumner House is a historic house at 4 Station Road in Hartland, Vermont. Built about 1807, it is a fine local example of Federal period architecture, exhibiting the influence of architect Asher Benjamin. It was built for David Sumner, a major local landowner and operator of sawmills. The house, now the Sumner Mansion Inn, was listed on the National Register of Historic Places in 1989.

== Description and history ==
The David Sumner House occupies a prominent position in the main village of Hartland, set in the southeast crook of a bend in United States Route 5 at its junction with Vermont Route 12 and Quechee Road. Its main block is a two-story brick structure, from which a two-story and single-story ell, both of 20th-century construction, extend to the rear. The main block is five bays wide and two deep, with the main entrance at the center of the north-facing front facade. It is flanked by sidelight windows and is topped by a multilight arched transom with a projecting overhang above. The window above the entrance is a full-length sash with a rounded top, and is flanked by sidelights in the style of a Palladian window. The ground-floor windows on the front are topped by decorative headers. The roof is encircled by a balustrade, which is a 20th-century addition recovered from another period house. The building interior retains many original features, including an elliptically curved central staircase. The two ells were added in the 20th-century; the first was made to original plans of the house that were not executed at the time of its construction.

The house was built about 1807, possibly to a design by Asher Benjamin or one of his apprentices; Benjamin was active in the area earlier in the decade. David Sumner was a major local landowner engaged in the lumber business and civic affairs. He operated local sawmills, worked to improve the navigability of the Connecticut River, and built bridges across the river to improve the area's transportation. It served in town offices, the state legislature, and the local militia during the War of 1812. This house was his home until his death in 1867. In 1970, the building's owner, Marvin Hatch, added the roof balustrade and the first ell, the latter based on discovered house plans. The building now serves as an inn and event venue.

== See also ==
- National Register of Historic Places listings in Windsor County, Vermont
