= North Hartland, Vermont =

Census-designated place in Vermont, United States

- Census-designated place
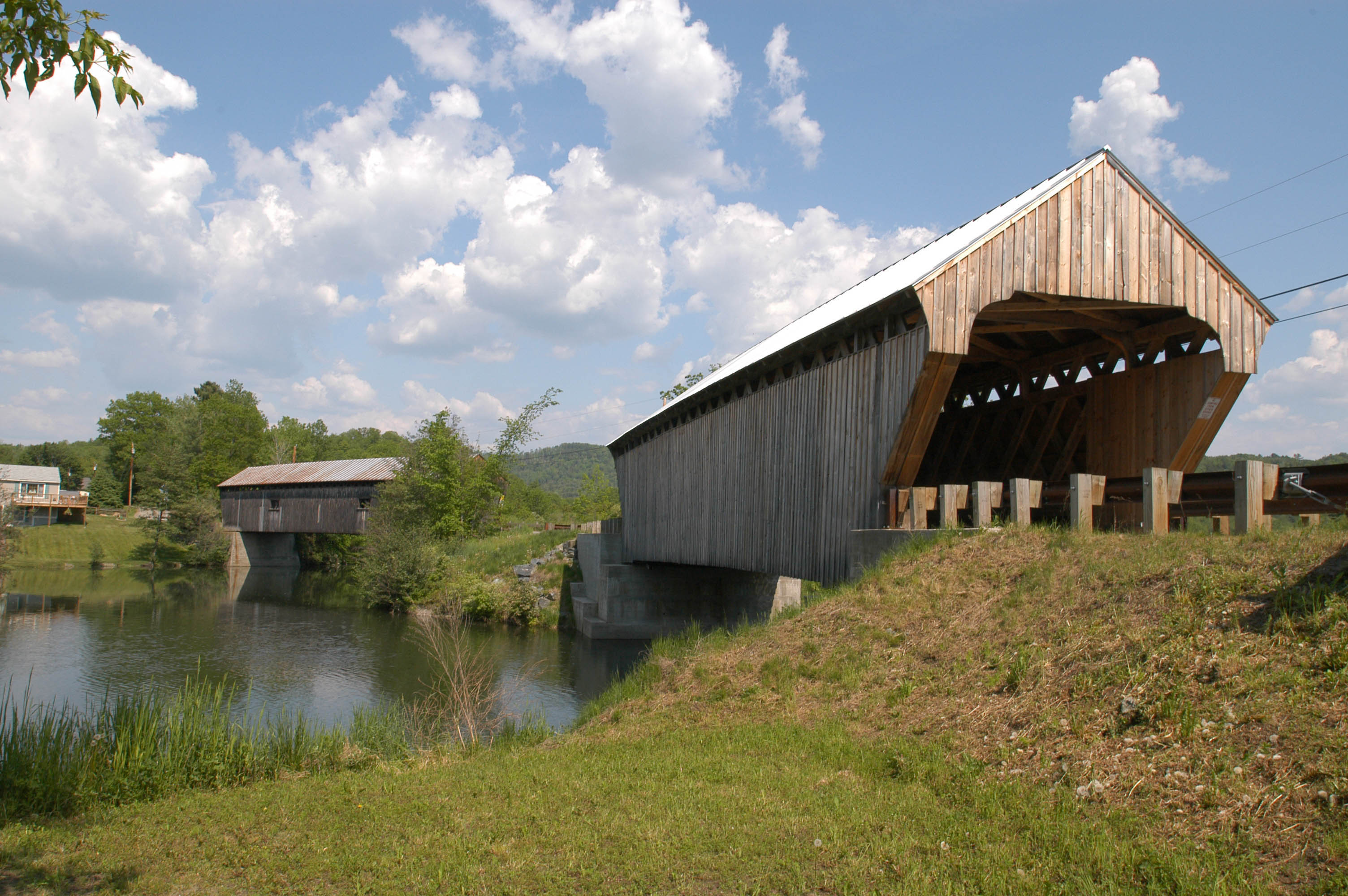
- Willard Covered Bridge

- Location in Windsor County and the state of Vermont.
- Coordinates: 43°35′37″N 72°21′28″W
- Country: United States
- State: Vermont
- County: Windsor

Area
  - Total: 1.0 sq mi (2.7 km^{2})
  - Land: 1.0 sq mi (2.6 km^{2})
  - Water: 0.039 sq mi (0.1 km^{2})
- Elevation: 420 ft (130 m)

Population (2020)
  - Total: 321
  - Density: 320/sq mi (120/km^{2})
- Time zone: UTC-5 (Eastern (EST))
  - Summer (DST): UTC-4 (EDT)
- ZIP code: 05052
- Area code: 802
- FIPS code: 50-50500
- GNIS feature ID: 2586644

North Hartland is a census-designated place (CDP) in the town of Hartland, Windsor County, Vermont, United States. As of the 2020 census, North Hartland had a population of 321.

== Geography ==
North Hartland is located in eastern Windsor County at the junction of the Ottauquechee River with the Connecticut River. U.S. Route 5 passes through the village, connecting White River Junction to the north with Hartland and Windsor to the south. Interstate 91 passes just north of the village, but there is no direct access from North Hartland.
