= Hilda L. Stone =

Prohibition-era American bootlegger

- Born: Taftsville (Woodstock), Vermont
- Occupation: Bootlegger
- Years active: 1925-1928
- Spouse: Frank Stome
- Status: Imprisoned
- Motive: Money and "thrills"
- Criminal charges: Smuggling
- Escaped: November 24, 1925

Details
- Killed: 0
- Injured: 0
- Weapon: None

Hilda L. Stone (née Green; born August 1897) was an American bootlegger who smuggled liquor from the Canadian border to Boston during the Prohibition era. Operating from her home in West Halifax, Vermont, she transported premium liquors through New England to serve elite clientele in the Boston area. Active between 1925 and 1928, she was known as the "Queen of the Bootleggers" and "Duchess of Alcohol." She was arrested multiple times for smuggling violations and was sentenced to six months imprisonment in January 1926. Stone later became a federal fugitive after failing to appear for new charges in 1928.

== Early life ==
Hilda L. Stone (née Green) was born in August 1897 in Taftsville, Vermont. She was 28 years old at the time of her imprisonment in February 1926, though border patrol rumors circulated claiming she was between 30 and 45 years old. Stone's father was born in Connecticut and her mother was from England. She had two sisters and one brother. Stone's parents were described as "good, honest, everyday" people who were respected in their community.

Stone attended village school in Taftsville and graduated from Randolph High School in Randolph, Vermont. She subsequently completed a course in bookkeeping and stenography at a business college in Burlington, Vermont.

Stone described her early life as that of "the average girl in a rural New England community," noting she was "a sort of tomboy" who loved outdoor activities including fishing and hunting. Her father taught her to use firearms from childhood, and she became "a pretty good shot," though she deliberately chose not to carry a revolver during her smuggling operations, stating it was "apt to get you in bad."

Stone was raised with strong religious influences, attending Sabbath School and church regularly both before and after her marriage. She described herself as "studious and judicious as a girl" and maintained a good reputation in her community until she began bootlegging.

Stone described herself as "old-fashioned," preferring traditional waltzes to the Charleston dance craze, though she enjoyed jazz music. She did not smoke or drink alcohol, later stating she "loathed" alcohol and never smoked cigarettes for health reasons. Despite her traditional personal habits, Stone held progressive views on gender equality, stating she didn't "believe in a double moral standard" and that "women have as much right to drink and smoke as men have, if they care to."

After completing business college, Stone's parents moved to Athol, Massachusetts, where she worked as both a bookkeeper and stenographer.

Stone married Frank Stone when he hired her mother to do bookkeeping work for his lumber business. Stone took over the work as a "confidential secretary," conducting evening bookkeeping sessions in her parents' dining room. During these sessions, Frank courted her with candy, flowers, and invitations to the theater. He eventually proposed during one of their business meetings, and Stone recalled being "unutterably happy" when she accepted. They were married by the Rev. Mr. Peak on July 30, 1917 in Athol, Massachusetts.

After marriage, the couple moved to West Halifax, Vermont, where Frank operated his first sawmill, and he later established a second mill in Harrisville. Stone continued managing Frank's business affairs, keeping track of his books, collecting letters and bills, and spending considerable time traveling by automobile for business purposes, experience that later proved valuable for her bootlegging operations. The couple had no children.

Stone claimed West Halifax, Vermont as her home, though law enforcement sources indicated she came from Colrain, Massachusetts. The two towns are adjacent along the Vermont-Massachusetts border, and the family's property may have straddled both jurisdictions.

Contemporary newspapers referred to Stone by various nicknames including "Duchess of Alcohol," "Bobbed Bootlegger," and "Queen of the Rum Runners."

== Bootlegging career ==
=== Operations ===
As her husband's lumber business faced financial difficulties and potential bankruptcy, Stone abandoned housework and began bootlegging operations to help with the financial crisis. In her autobiographical account, Stone described Frank's lumber business as having suffered serious financial setbacks in the year before their marriage. Stone stated that she made the decision to enter rum-running in June 1925 at her home in West Halifax, after spending months seeking ways to save the business from ruin. Stone made her first smuggling trip on May 11, 1925, when she traveled to the Canadian border with her guide Tony to purchase ale. In a jail interview, Stone described her turn to rum-running as motivated by "love for her husband and a mad resolve to help him out of a financial squeeze."

Stone served as a principal field agent in a Massachusetts-based rum-running operation, transporting liquor from the Canadian border through New England to Boston. For her first smuggling trip to the Canadian border, Stone was guided by an associate she identified as "Tony," who introduced her to the smuggling network and taught her the routes and methods. Stone also worked with another guide known as "Pete the Prowler," who was familiar with all the rum-running roads.

Stone's first customer was a prosperous, middle-aged Boston businessman who placed an order for 30 cases of premium liquors, including Veuve Clicquot, Mumm, Pol Roger, and Pommery champagnes, along with Scotch whisky and cognac. The size of this initial order convinced Stone she needed a larger vehicle than her roadster. Her second trip to the Canadian border was her first solo delivery, marking her quick progression to independent operations.

As her business grew, Stone upgraded from her roadster to a larger used coach, which she purchased with cash to avoid installment obligations. She had the vehicle tuned "like a racing machine" and kept her roadster as a backup. Stone had a false bottom professionally installed on her coach by a specialist recommended by Tony, and also equipped the vehicle with curtains and blankets to conceal loads during transport.

When she needed to purchase this larger vehicle, Tony introduced her to Harry Murdock, a 200-pound mechanic who would inspect the vehicle. Murdock was both a skilled mechanic and expert driver, and Stone hired him as her chauffeur after witnessing his abilities. Stone systematically tested Murdock's capabilities as a bootlegger by taking him on one of her established routes. Despite her own eight years of driving experience, Stone was impressed by Murdock's superior skills, noting he could "burn up the road without taxing the car," and described him as "level-headed and big and plucky enough to be a real protector in an emergency."

Murdock's exceptional driving skills helped them escape from dangerous situations, though Stone noted they were "nearly killed several times in desperate attempts." Murdock advised Stone on vehicle maintenance, emphasizing the importance of quality tires and spare equipment for high-speed police pursuits, noting that a tire blowout during a chase with armed police could be catastrophic.

Despite strong warnings from Tony and Murdock, who told her that solo border runs required "the iciest kind of man's nerve" and was not "a woman's job," Stone insisted on making solo trips to prove her capabilities, declaring "I am going through alone or bust."

Stone and her associates paid Pete the Prowler for intelligence about patrol schedules at the border, allowing them to time their crossings when enforcement was minimal. The Prowler also actively assisted during smuggling runs, riding ahead on his motorcycle to scout for patrols and using hand signals to warn Stone of danger, pointing with his left arm to indicate locations and winking to signal when it was safe to proceed.

Stone described operating "on a business basis" within the smuggling network, where associates treated her with professional respect due to her serious approach to the work and her status as a married woman supporting her husband's business.

Stone contrasted her professional approach with that of reckless operators in the smuggling network. She noted that "girl blinds"—female companions used by male bootleggers for cover—often proved to be security risks due to their tendency to gossip and engage in "riotous living." Stone avoided this lifestyle, maintaining a quiet profile and resting between trips. She also observed that another bootlegger, Jimmy Hayes, despite being clever, would drink and boast about his exploits in public places, behavior she considered "the height of folly."

Stone modified her vehicle for bootlegging, installing improved suspension and a high-powered engine to evade law enforcement. The car also featured a secret compartment for concealing liquor and carried license plates from multiple states. Stone avoided detection by studying maps, varying her routes, and rarely returning by the same path she took outbound, attributing her success to both luck and systematic planning. During her smuggling runs between Canada and Boston, Stone stopped at establishments including the Four Poster Inn in Burlington and Whitehall.

When confronted by border patrols, Stone posed as a lost American tourist, telling officers "I'm lost in a strange country" and playing a demure, innocent role. She carefully controlled her speed during border crossings, initially driving at 35 miles per hour before deliberately slowing to 20 mph to appear like a cautious tourist. Stone concealed liquor under both seats and piled under blankets in the back of her vehicle, with a suitcase placed carelessly on top to create an appearance of normalcy.

On one notable trip, Stone successfully evaded Canadian border patrols twice—once while entering Canada when the Prowler warned her to hide her contraband before a patrol arrived, and again on the return journey when she used careful speed control and deception to pass through a patrol checkpoint. During the return crossing, a patrol officer who had unknowingly directed her to a liquor supplier earlier vouched for her to another officer, calling her a "Yankee flapper who lost her way," allowing her to pass through with a full load of contraband.

In interviews given while incarcerated in Washington County jail, Vermont, Stone described herself as an expert motorist and marksman who had been familiar with firearms since childhood. She conducted many of her deliveries in broad daylight, parking her liquor-laden automobile on Massachusetts Avenue in Boston, between Boylston Street and Commonwealth Avenue, where she would wait for buyers to arrive and signal for delivery to suburban mansions. Despite police officers passing by during the midday rush, her activities went undetected.

Stone claimed to supply liquor to prominent Boston-area customers, including society men and women, millionaires, business and professional leaders, and public officials, many of whom she said were listed in the Social Register. She worked through a Boston agent whose identity she declined to reveal, stating that disclosure would "be a sensation in itself, because of his prominence in business circles."

Stone's Boston distributor, whom she referred to as "Mr. Blank," gradually revealed the identities of his customers over several weeks as he built trust with her. The clientele included a major manufacturer and a state official, with deliveries made to "splendid estates." Stone specifically described her customer base as including "blue bloods and millionaires," business and professional men, public officials, and society women, whom she referred to as "women tipplers." She stated that she supplied "some of the most notable families in Greater Boston" and "well-known public officials," but refused to reveal their identities, saying their names and addresses would cause a sensation.

Stone took pride in serving elite customers, viewing herself as their "emissary" rather than a small-time operator. Her largest documented single-product shipment was 36 cases of champagne ordered specifically for upcoming June weddings among her elite clientele, reflecting seasonal demand patterns in her smuggling operations.

Stone adamantly denied claims that she became a bootlegger "for the thrill of it," insisting it was a "grim business proposition" undertaken "after long and careful deliberation" to help her husband and herself out of a "financial plight." However, border patrol officers reported that Stone "admitted a fondness for the 'thrill' of pursuit by customs officers." She attempted other business ventures before turning to bootlegging, including raising turkeys, which she continued "when business is dull."

Stone argued that her wealthy customers who bought liquor illegally were "a greater menace" than she was, calling them hypocrites who "defy the liquor law on the sly" while maintaining respectable reputations. She emphasized that her customers were exclusively wealthy individuals who could afford liquor as a luxury, stating "I never took coin from the poor. My customers were all wealthy."

Stone maintained that she only sold genuine Canadian liquor and "never handled a drop of the poison being palmed off as liquor." She distinguished herself from bootleggers who sold dangerous moonshine or "hootch," stating "I never was a poisoner" and claiming she never sent a customer to the hospital or caused a death. Stone asserted that all liquor she transported from Canada was "guaranteed" quality.

In her account, Stone described corruption among border patrol officers, stating that while Canadian border inspectors were difficult to bribe, "it was much easier to grease the palms of certain patrols on the American side." She described lower-level officers accepting $10 to $15 per load (equivalent to approximately $180 to $270 in 2024), while higher-ranking members of smuggling rings received larger payoffs. Stone noted that some border patrol officers remained honest and could not be bribed.

During one delivery in Boston, Stone was stopped by a traffic police chief for a traffic violation while carrying contraband liquor. After checking her papers, the chief instructed her to "be careful in the future to watch the traffic signal" and allowed her to proceed, unaware of the illegal cargo in her vehicle.

During a border crossing, a patrolman confronted Stone, stating "We have a report that a woman in a car like this and described somewhat as you look has been running in liquor. Are you the woman?" Despite being frightened, Stone denied the accusation emphatically and was issued a certificate allowing her to proceed.

On one smuggling run, Stone and Murdock encountered armed border patrol officers at a covered bridge in New Hampshire. When the motorcycle patrol officers spotted them, Murdock executed a rapid reversal maneuver to escape. The patrol opened fire, with at least three shots fired at their vehicle. Stone recalled Murdock warning her to "Squat low. Flatten yourself all you can. They're apt to shoot." Despite the gunfire and dangerous conditions including heavy rain, fog, and slippery roads, Murdock's expert driving enabled their escape around 3:00 AM, with only two bottles of champagne broken in the pursuit. When Stone spotted the armed patrols at the bridge, she used her knowledge of local roads to direct an alternate escape route. Stone later told her Boston distributor that "two fractured bottles wasn't serious casualty for such a skirmish."

On her first trip, Stone purchased Canadian ale for approximately $5 to $6 per case and sold it in Boston for $20 per case, a profit margin that the Boston American calculated as 233 percent. Scotch whisky typically cost $12 to $15 per case at the border, while champagnes ranged from $60 to $80 per case, with profits varying from $25 to $80 per case depending on the product. Stone conducted sales at roadside tourist houses, meeting buyers at prearranged locations rather than in Boston proper.

Stone's largest smuggling operation involved two vehicles carrying high-class brandy, champagne, and old Scotch. With Harry Murdock leading in one car and Stone following in the other, they successfully crossed the border after Pop and the Prowler diverted border patrol officers who were searching for a stolen car with Massachusetts plates. Stone delivered the double load near Huntington Avenue in Boston on Friday the 13th, which she considered her lucky number. This operation netted her $500 in profit (equivalent to approximately $9,000 in 2024 dollars) after deducting Murdock's share and all expenses, making it her biggest and most profitable haul.

Following the loss of Murdock's assistance after the August 1925 arrest, Stone was limited to operating with a single vehicle, which she described as a "distinct hardship" during the busy Thanksgiving and Christmas season of 1925. Despite these setbacks, she worked to fulfill orders from her Boston distributor, Mr. Blank, who had "treated her on the level" and provided guidance to reduce her operational risks.

Stone explained her decision to smuggle from Canada rather than purchase from cheaper domestic sources by emphasizing quality and reliability. Her supplier, Pop, noted that much of the supposedly "imported" liquor sold in the United States was actually domestic moonshine with fake labels. Stone's elite customers—including business leaders and officials—demanded authentic Canadian products that could be delivered on a reliable schedule, which Pop summarized as "SAPPITY AND SCHEDULE" (quality and schedule). This business model justified the higher risks of cross-border smuggling.

Stone described her "greatest adventure" as bootlegger as the time she transported her parents and niece from a vacation camp in northern Vermont, with a large load of champagne, Scotch, and brandy hidden in her car's false bottom. Her parents had no idea she was a rum-runner, believing they were simply receiving a ride home.

During the journey, armed motorcycle patrols stopped the vehicle, but Stone successfully deceived them by smiling sweetly and acting frightened and innocent. The patrol apologized for alarming her and left without inspecting the car. Stone's father, unaware of the contraband, ironically explained to the family that the patrol had probably mistaken their car for rum-runners, joking "What a joke it was on them."

Stone drove her family to West Halifax overnight, then delivered the contraband to her Boston distributor the next day. She later recalled this incident as more thrilling than her later arrests. Had the car and cargo been confiscated, Stone estimated the loss at $1,600 (approximately $29,000 in 2024 dollars), plus scandal and fines. Her Boston distributor later commented on her successful deception: "Fooled by a woman's smile... What a title for a movie."

=== Arrests ===
Stone was arrested four times between August and December 1925 before her final imprisonment.

Stone's first arrest occurred on August 21, 1925, when she and Harry Murdock were confronted by border patrol officers north of St. Albans, near Island Pond, Vermont. A contemporary Boston American account identified the arresting officers as Customs Officers Phelps and Wood in Newport, Vermont, and reported that bail was set at $600. The article stated that Stone brandished a revolver at the officers when they stopped her vehicle carrying Canadian liquor, and that both she and Murdock jumped from the moving car before being overtaken.

This contemporary account conflicts with Stone's later claim in her autobiographical series that she deliberately never carried a revolver during her smuggling operations, stating it was "apt to get you in bad." Stone admitted to officers that she had made "a similar trip last week."

In her autobiographical account, Stone described the arresting officer as Knowlton of Barger, who she said was an "old enemy" who had "sworn to get" her after months of failed attempts and took her evasions as "personal insults." In her version of events, when the armed officers blocked the road and signaled them to stop, Murdock accelerated instead, forcing the patrol to jump out of the way.

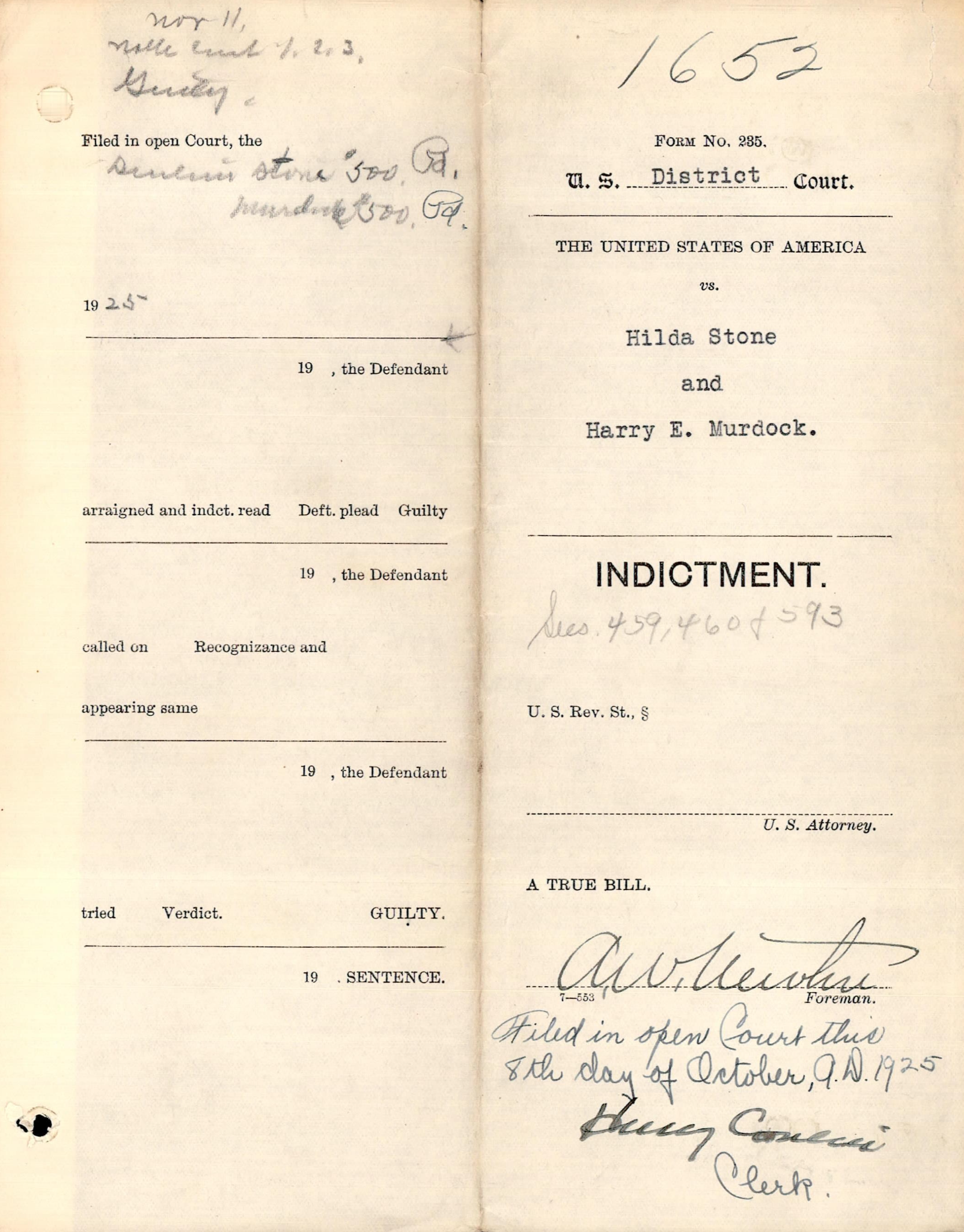
United States v. Hilda Stone and Harry E. Murdock - Federal Indictment

On October 8, 1925, Stone and Murdock were indicted by a federal grand jury in Rutland as case number 1652 in the U.S. District Court for the District of Vermont. On November 11, 1925, both defendants appeared in Burlington with their attorney, M.G. Leary, and pleaded guilty. Stone was sentenced to pay a fine of $500 (approximately $9,000 in 2024 dollars), which she paid immediately to the court clerk and was discharged. Murdock received the same sentence and likewise paid his fine and was discharged.

Stone's second arrest occurred on November 24, 1925, near Beechers Falls, New Hampshire, "under fire." Federal officers had "laid in a trap for weeks" before capturing her. According to an Associated Press report published December 1, 1925, Stone, Harry Murdock, and Fred Knowles of Bangor, Maine, were arrested after attempting to rush the border with a load of 133 bottles of hard liquors. Liquor valued at $1,500 (approximately $27,000 in 2024 dollars) was seized from the vehicle.

The patrol pursued on motorcycles and opened fire during a high-speed chase. Stone recalled being "under fire" with bullets whistling close to the car, and noted that the previous day patrol had "riddled a twin-six" belonging to another bootlegger. A third patrol officer had been positioned in ambush further down the road, and the officers surrounded and captured Stone, Murdock, and Knowles. The coach's false bottom contained high-grade whiskey and brandy.

The three were placed in jail at Stratford. Murdock and Knowles were arraigned before Commissioner Thurston at Island Pond and bound over to Federal District Court. Stone was transferred to North Stratford jail. Following her transfer from Island Pond to North Stratford, revenue agents arrived to find Stone gone, with only Murdock and Knowles remaining. Rumors circulated that Stone had escaped by bribing a jailer or "sawing her way to freedom." A contemporary Boston American report confirmed that Stone was released through "a misunderstanding on the part of the North Stratford jailkeeper" during the transfer of prisoners. Stone later explained that her absence was due to a bureaucratic mistake rather than an actual escape, stating she had been released after paying her fine and was unaware of the "escape" stories for some time while she continued bootlegging operations.

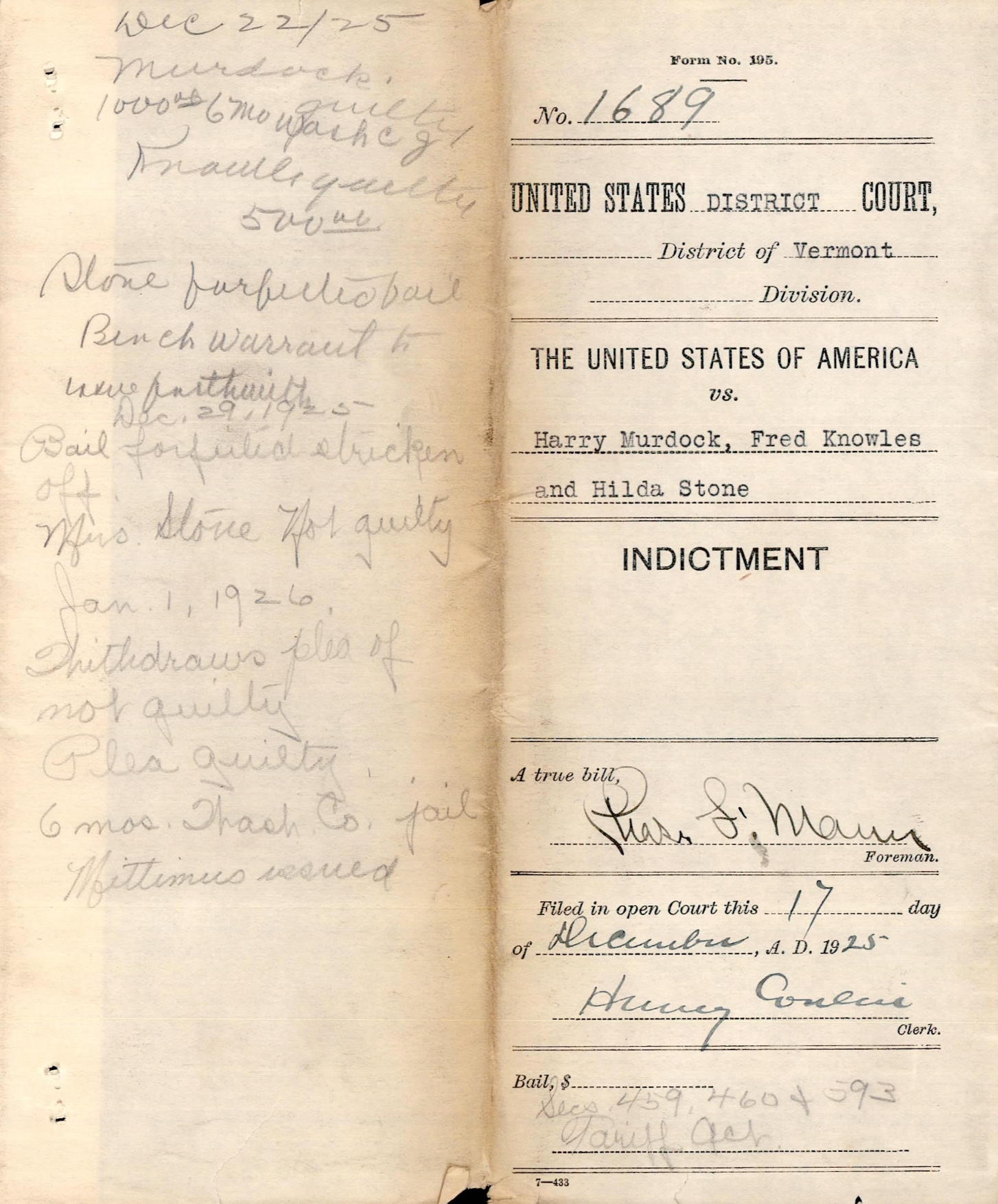
United States v. Harry Murdock, Fred Knowles and Hilda Stone - Federal Indictment

On December 17, 1925, Stone, Murdock, and Knowles were indicted by a federal grand jury in Brattleboro on charges of violating Sections 459, 460, and 593 of the Tariff Act, as case number 1689 in the U.S. District Court for the District of Vermont. On December 22, 1925, Murdock and Knowles appeared in court in Montpelier, where both pleaded guilty. Murdock was sentenced to pay a fine of $1,000 and six months imprisonment in Washington County Jail in Montpelier, while Knowles was sentenced to pay a fine of $500. When Stone failed to appear in court, her bail was forfeited and a bench warrant was issued for her arrest.

Unable to pay his fine, Murdock was committed in default and was still serving his sentence in Washington County Jail in February 1926. Stone calculated her total loss from her first two arrests at $1,650 (approximately $30,000 in 2024 dollars), which included confiscated vehicles, seized liquor, and fines.

Stone's third arrest occurred on December 5, 1925, when she was recaptured near Island Pond following her release from North Stratford jail. Deputy Collector and Inspector Walker T. Degree spotted a vehicle he suspected of carrying contraband and gave chase. Stone and her companions ditched their car and fled into the woods in different directions before being pursued and captured. She was traveling with an unidentified male companion whose identity was kept secret by authorities. Stone was arraigned before a United States commissioner and sent to jail in Newport after failing to furnish $600 bail.

Following her December 5 arrest, Stone was subjected to an all-night interrogation in Littleton, New Hampshire, by six men in a smoke-filled room, which she described as becoming "rough and abusive." She was released at 3:30 AM with no transportation and took a taxi seventy miles home. Her car was seized, and Stone hired a lawyer to recover it, refusing to pay a bribe to expedite its return, stating "Law is law, even if a woman bootlegger is concerned." Following this interrogation, Frank Stone "tenderly took his wife in his arms and renewed his entreaties for her to quit" bootlegging, but she continued her operations.

Stone's fourth arrest occurred on December 20, 1925, in Lyme, New Hampshire, when she was stopped by Sheriff Walter B.H. French. She was being driven by R.J. Brickman of Providence, Rhode Island. Although the vehicle had New Hampshire license plates, Brickman produced a Rhode Island registration certificate. Authorities discovered secret compartments in the vehicle but found no liquor, and both Stone and Brickman were released.

Stone told police she had been on her way to Franconia with spare parts for a disabled automobile; in a Franconia Notch garage, authorities found a car in battered condition containing license plates from New York, Connecticut, Rhode Island, and New Hampshire. At the time of this arrest, Stone was already on $1,500 bail for failing to appear at a Newport, Vermont court hearing on smuggling charges.

According to the report, Stone had told officials following her December 5 arrest that she ran liquor "for the thrill of it" and thought it "rather fun" to be pursued by officers, and that when money was low she turned to rum running as a pastime. In her later autobiographical account, Stone described her decision to enter bootlegging as a "grim business proposition" undertaken to help her husband out of financial difficulties, though she acknowledged the excitement of evading capture.

On December 22, 1925, when Murdock and Knowles appeared for sentencing on case number 1689, Stone failed to appear in court. The court ordered her bail forfeited and issued a bench warrant for her arrest.

On December 29, 1925, Stone appeared in court in Burlington, and the court struck off the order forfeiting her bail. She was arraigned and pleaded not guilty, and the case was set down for trial by jury.

On January 1, 1926, Stone appeared before Judge Harland B. Howe in Burlington with her attorney, W.W. Lapoint. The court granted Stone leave to withdraw her plea of not guilty, and she was again arraigned and pleaded guilty. Judge Howe sentenced Stone to six months imprisonment in Washington County Jail in Montpelier, with no fine imposed.

In her autobiographical account, Stone explained that she chose to plead guilty rather than go to trial in order to protect her husband and parents from the scandal of court proceedings. Stone described hearing her sentence on New Year's Day as particularly devastating, calling it a day that "held nothing but depression and disgrace." Frank Stone was not present at the sentencing, as Stone had deliberately kept him away to spare him the humiliation.

On December 28, 1925, Vermont Secretary of State Aaron H. Grout personally notified Stone that her right to drive in Vermont had been cancelled due to "alleged excessive efforts in the liquor traffic." Following her December 20 arrest, Frank Stone attempted to recover the seized automobile from federal authorities, claiming it had been "stolen from him." He traveled to Littleton, New Hampshire, where he demanded the car from federal officers but was unsuccessful. Stone then walked ten miles from Littleton to Lisbon for a meeting with Solicitor Frost, who had initiated civil forfeiture proceedings against the vehicle, but Frost was out of town. Stone subsequently hired Attorney Joseph Moore of Lebanon, New Hampshire, to contest the forfeiture. Stone, approximately 40 years old at the time, was both a sawmill operator and a second-hand car dealer.

=== Imprisonment and interviews ===
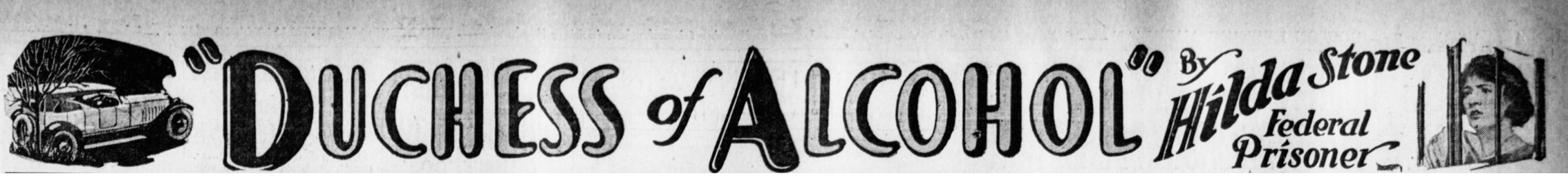
Banner graphic from the Boston American newspaper

Stone was the only female prisoner in Washington County Jail, which housed nearly 40 male prisoners. Rather than being placed in a barred cell, she was assigned to a small room on the second floor in a special compartment used for the few women prisoners the facility received. She was searched by a matron whom she described as "very kind." Despite the relatively favorable conditions, Stone, who was "passionately fond of all outdoors," found the prospect of six months imprisonment deeply distressing. While observers said she took the sentence "like an old offender," Stone maintained that she was devastated inwardly but kept her composure publicly.

Stone's first night in jail was New Year's night, January 1, 1926. She reported being unable to sleep, reflecting on her home, husband, and mother, and experiencing intense conscience and regret. Stone described how "one's past and errors unfold like a motion picture film" in the isolation of a cell. During her imprisonment, Frank Stone visited regularly as his business permitted, remaining "loyal and forgiving." Stone praised Sheriff H. J. Slayton and Deputy Sheriff H. W. McAilister as good officers who maintained strict discipline tempered with sympathy, noting that they made prisoners "feel that they are not beyond recall." Stone was grateful to be the only female prisoner, as she did not want to be grouped with other female criminals.

A notable aspect of Stone's imprisonment was the daily visit of 12-month-old Barbara McAilister, the deputy sheriff's daughter, who brought the morning paper to prisoners. Stone noted that the prisoners loved the child and called her "a ray of sunshine," with many who had children at home finding her visits particularly meaningful. Stone, who had no children of her own, found meeting Barbara bittersweet, reflecting that it was "a blessing that I was childless" given the "horror of disgrace" her criminal record would bring to a child.

Stone spent her time reading (including the Bible, which she found consoling), sewing, and writing letters. She accepted full responsibility for her situation, stating "I made the bed I'm lying on," but noted she was "learning something, even here." Stone hoped to earn a reduction in her sentence for good behavior, aiming to be released before June 1, 1926, rather than serving the full six months.

During her incarceration, she gave extensive interviews to newspapers, including a 20-part serialized autobiographical series published in the Boston American beginning February 1, 1926, under the title "Duchess of Alcohol."

In these interviews, Stone discussed her methods of obtaining and transporting liquor, the involvement of border patrol officials in graft operations, and the identities of her high-society clientele. She claimed knowledge of corruption among border patrols and officials, including details of "graft levied per case and load."

=== Local law enforcement response ===
Despite Stone's notoriety and coverage in newspapers including The New York Times, local Greenfield, Massachusetts authorities claimed to have little knowledge of her activities. The Law Enforcement League of Greenfield expressed surprise at the police department's stated ignorance of Stone's operations, noting that League members had known about her activities for some time.

Border patrol officers maintained that Stone was "one of the principal field agents of a ring which operates from Greenfield, Mass." In her interviews from jail, Stone defended the Greenfield police chief, stating he was "above reproach" and calling it "an outrage to impugn honest public officials." She denied working with a "big rum syndicate" or conducting activities in Greenfield itself.

=== Return to bootlegging and 1928 indictments ===
Following her release from Washington County Jail in mid-1926, Stone returned to rum-running activities. On February 29, 1928, a federal grand jury in Burlington indicted Stone along with Phillip McKiernan, Robert Benjamin, and Muriel Davison on two separate cases (numbers 2012 and 2075) charging violations of Sections 459, 460, and 593 of the Tariff Act and Section 3450 of the Revised Statutes. On March 1, 1928, the same defendants were indicted on a third case (number 2089) charging conspiracy under Section 37 of the Penal Code.

On March 12, 1928, when the defendants were called for arraignment in Burlington, only McKiernan and Davison appeared in court; Stone and Benjamin did not appear. McKiernan and Davison both pleaded not guilty to all charges, and their cases were consolidated for trial.

On August 20, 1928, the court ordered a bench warrant issued for Stone's arrest. On March 11, 1929, when Stone again failed to appear in court, her bail was forfeited.

On June 30, 1930, all three cases against Stone and her co-defendants were dismissed by court order.

== Later life and death ==
Following her failure to appear for the 1928 federal indictments, Stone's whereabouts and activities remain unknown. The circumstances of her later life and death have not been documented in available records.

== See also ==
- Prohibition in the United States
- Rum-running
