= Viola Chittenden White =

American poet (1890–1977)

Viola Chittenden White (August 3, 1890 – January 24, 1977) was an American poet and academic.

== Works ==
- Not Faster Than a Walk: A Vermont Notebook (1939). Middlebury, Vermont: Middlebury College Press.
- Vermont Diary: An Intimate Record of Country Walks (1956). Boston, Massachusetts: Charles T. Branford Company.
- Partridge in a Swamp: The Journals of Viola C. White, 1918-1941 (1979). W. Storrs Lee (ed.). Taftsville, Vermont: Countryman Press.
