= Isaac Bullard =

Isaac Bullard may refer to:

- Isaac Bullard (religious leader), 19th-century Pentecostal religious leader in Vermont
- Isaac Bullard (politician) (1774–1808), representative to the Great and General Court in Massachusetts
