= Hartland Four Corners, Vermont =

- Village
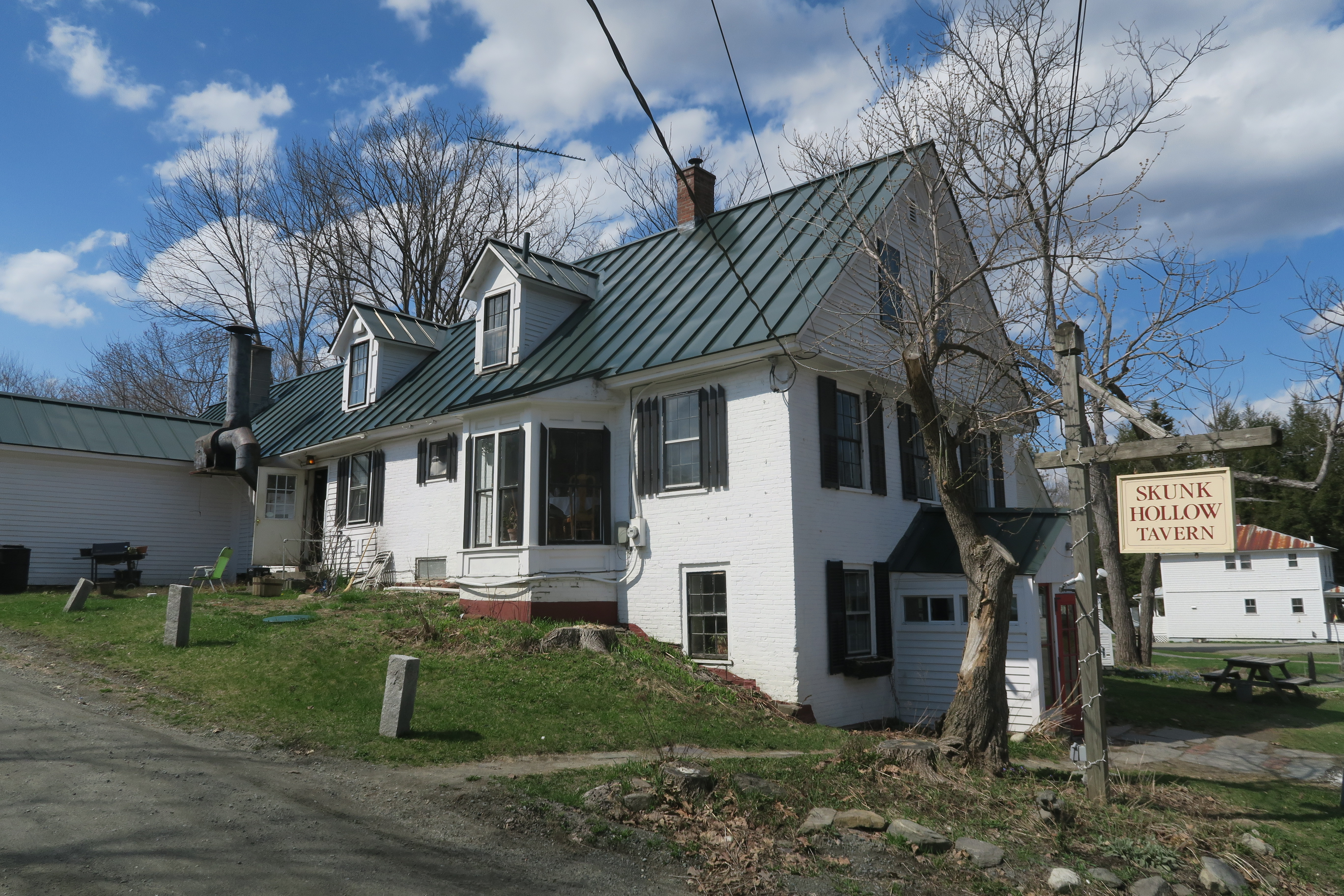
- Skunk Hollow Tavern

- Location within Vermont
- Coordinates: 43°32′47″N 72°25′28″W
- Country: United States
- State: Vermont
- County: Windsor
- Elevation: 627 ft (191 m)
- Time zone: UTC-5 (Eastern (EST))
  - Summer (DST): UTC-4 (EDT)
- ZIP code: 05049
- Area code: 802
- GNIS feature ID: 1457748

Hartland Four Corners is an unincorporated village in the town of Hartland, Windsor County, Vermont, United States. The community is located along Vermont Route 12, 8.8 miles (14.2 km) southwest of White River Junction. Hartland Four Corners has a post office with ZIP code 05049, which opened on July 5, 1854.
