= Taftsville Covered Bridge =

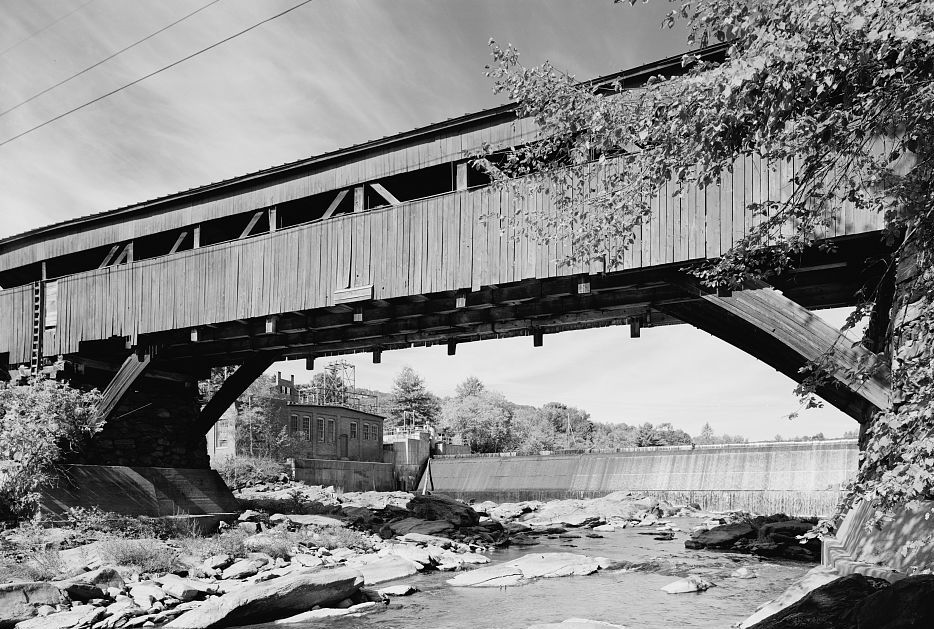
- HAER photo of Taftsville Covered Bridge, 2004
- Coordinates: 43.630867°N 72.4678975°W
- Carries: Covered Bridge Road between Woodstock Road & Upper River Road
- Crosses: Ottauquechee River
- Locale: Woodstock, Vermont

Characteristics
- Design: modified multiple-kingpost truss with semi-independent arch
- Material: Wood
- Total length: 189 feet (57.6 m)
- Width: 20 feet (6.1 m)
- No. of spans: 2
- Piers in water: 1

History
- Designer: Solomon Emmons III
- Opened: 1836
- Taftsville Covered Bridge
- U.S. National Register of Historic Places
- NRHP reference No.: 73000214
- Added to NRHP: August 28, 1973

Location
- Interactive map of Taftsville Covered Bridge

The Taftsville Covered Bridge is a timber-framed covered bridge which spans the Ottauquechee River in the Taftsville village of Woodstock, Vermont, in the United States. Built in 1836 and exhibiting no influence from patented bridge designs, it is among the oldest remaining covered bridges both in Vermont and the nation as a whole.

== History ==
The village of Taftsville was first settled more than 70 years before the construction of the modern Taftsville Bridge. Stephen Taft, after whom the village was ultimately named, arrived in the early 1790s. Within a decade of Taft's arrival, he and his brother had established a number of mills and the increasingly busy settlement required a bridge over the Ottauquechee River. The first bridge was washed away during a flood in 1807, with its replacement also falling to floodwaters in 1811. When the third bridge at the site was again washed away during an 1828 flood, a distinguished local by the name of Solomon Emmons III was contracted to build a more resilient crossing. His timber-framed, covered bridge was completed in 1836 and still stands today as the modern Taftsville Bridge.

The Taftsville Bridge was extensively damaged by flooding caused by Hurricane Irene in 2011, and was closed for two years while repairs took place. It was reopened in September 2013.

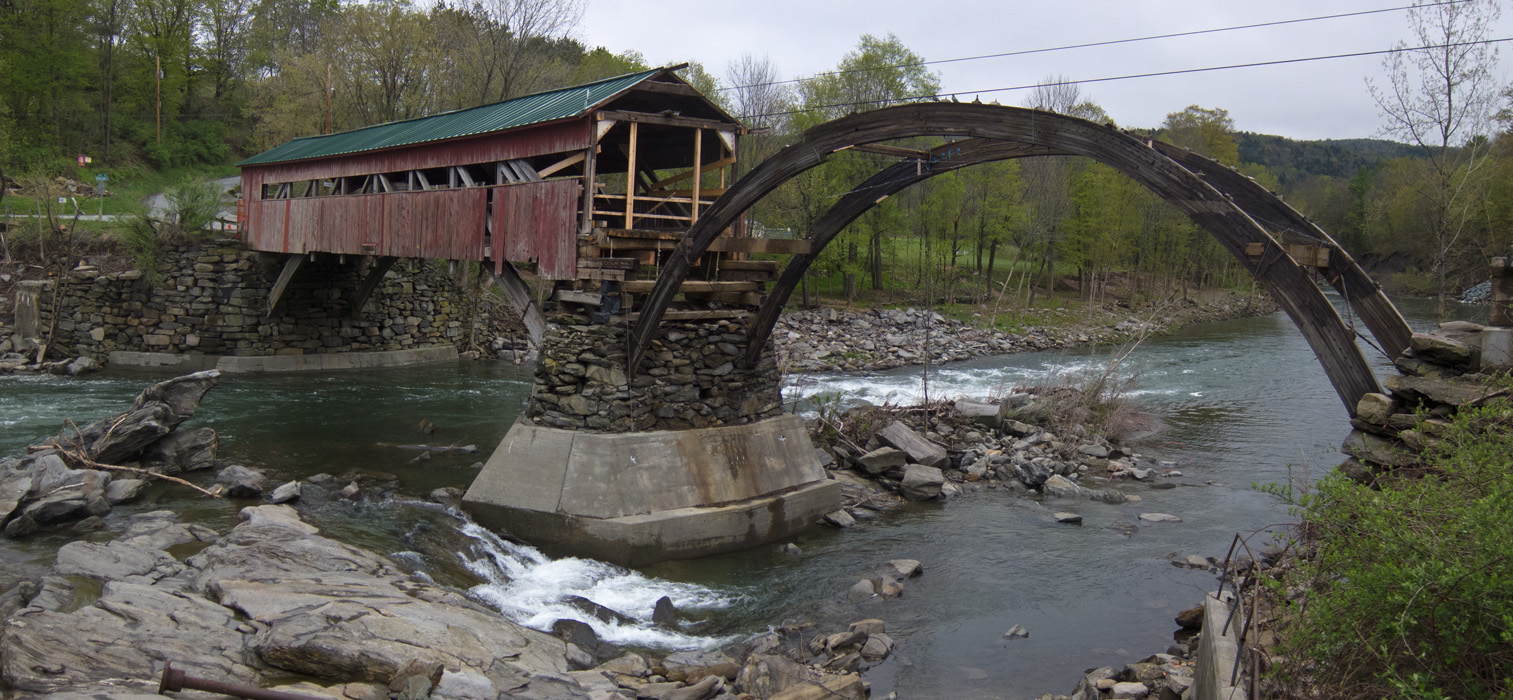
Damage caused by flood waters on the Ottauquechee River as a result of Hurricane Irene

== Architecture ==
Unlike many extant covered bridges which are based upon patented bridge designs, the Taftsville Bridge reflects an earlier "craftsman" bridge-building tradition that was possibly influenced by designs found in Switzerland. While the incorporation of laminated arches in the bridge structure is generally indicative of the well-known Burr arch-truss, which was patented in the United States in 1817, the resemblance is purely superficial. Instead, the unusual design of the Taftsville Bridge is better described as a "modified multiple kingpost truss with semi-independent arches".

Taftsville Bridge reaches a total of 189 feet (58 m) over the Ottauquechee River with two spans of 89 feet (27 m) and 100 feet (30 m) from either river bank to a central pier in the river gorge. The bridge measures 20 feet (6.1 m) in width, providing an interior roadway that is 16 feet (4.9 m).

== See also ==
- List of Vermont covered bridges
- List of bridges documented by the Historic American Engineering Record in Vermont
- List of bridges on the National Register of Historic Places in Vermont
- National Register of Historic Places listings in Windsor County, Vermont
