= Woodstock, Vermont =

- Town
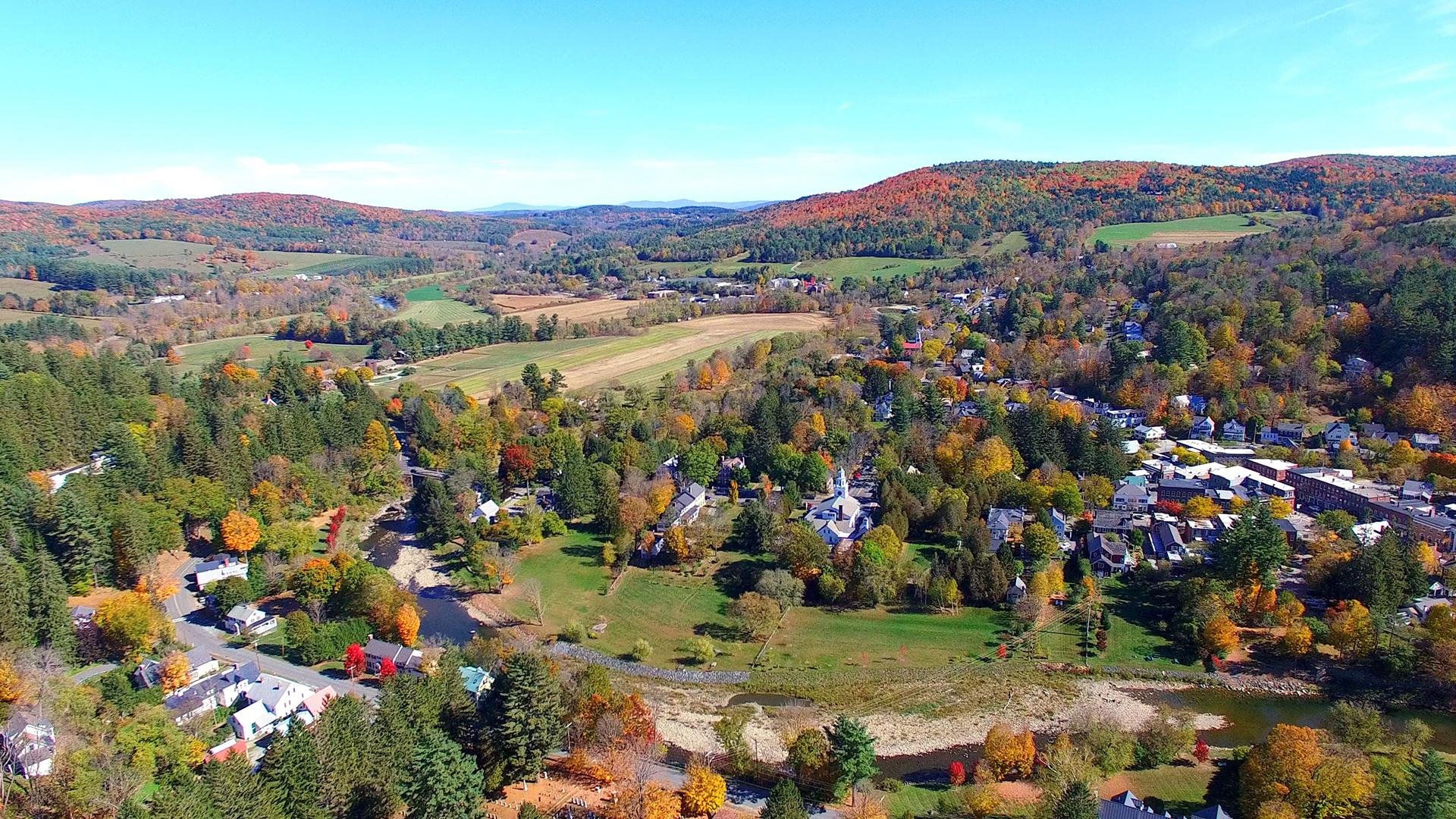
- Woodstock foliage

- Logo
- Motto: We are one.
- Location in Windsor County and the state of Vermont.
- Coordinates: 43°36′25″N 72°32′50″W
- Country: United States
- State: Vermont
- County: Windsor
- Chartered: 1761
- Communities: Woodstock; Prosper; South Woodstock; Taftsville; West Woodstock

Area
  - Total: 44.6 sq mi (115.6 km^{2})
  - Land: 44.4 sq mi (114.9 km^{2})
  - Water: 0.27 sq mi (0.7 km^{2})
- Elevation: 1,139 ft (347 m)

Population (2020)
  - Total: 3,005
  - Density: 67.74/sq mi (26.15/km^{2})
- Time zone: UTC-5 (Eastern (EST))
  - Summer (DST): UTC-4 (EDT)
- ZIP Codes: 05091 (Woodstock); 05071 (South Woodstock); 05034 (Bridgewater)
- Area code: 802
- FIPS code: 50-85975
- GNIS feature ID: 1462272
- Website: www.townofwoodstock.org

Woodstock is the shire town (county seat) of Windsor County, Vermont, United States. As of the 2020 census, the town population was 3,005. It includes the villages of Woodstock, South Woodstock, Taftsville, and West Woodstock.

== History ==
Chartered by New Hampshire Governor Benning Wentworth on July 10, 1761, the town was a New Hampshire grant to David Page and 61 others. It was named after Woodstock in Oxfordshire, England, as a homage to both Blenheim Palace and its owner, George Spencer, 4th Duke of Marlborough. The town was first settled in 1768 by James Sanderson and his family. In 1776, Joab Hoisington built a gristmill, followed by a sawmill, on the south branch of the Ottauquechee River. The town was incorporated in 1837.

Although the Revolution slowed settlement, Woodstock developed rapidly once the war ended in 1783. The Vermont General Assembly met here in 1807 before moving the next year to the new capital at Montpelier. Waterfalls in the Ottauquechee River provided water power to operate mills. Factories made scythes and axes, carding machines, and woolens. There was a machine shop and gunsmith shop. Manufacturers also produced furniture, wooden wares, window sashes and blinds. Carriages, horse harnesses, saddles, luggage trunks and leather goods were also manufactured. By 1859, the population was 3,041. The Woodstock Railroad opened to White River Junction on September 29, 1875, carrying freight and tourists. The Woodstock Inn opened in 1892.

The Industrial Revolution helped the town grow prosperous. The economy is now largely driven by tourism. Woodstock has the 20th highest per-capita income of Vermont towns as reported by the United States Census, and a high percentage of homes owned by non-residents. The town's central square, called the Green, is bordered by restored late Georgian, Federal Style, and Greek Revival houses. The cost of real estate in the district adjoining the Green is among the highest in the state. The seasonal presence of wealthy second-home owners from cities such as Boston and New York has contributed to the town's economic vitality and livelihood, while at the same time diminished its accessibility to native Vermonters.

The town maintains a free community wi-fi internet service that covers most of the village of Woodstock, dubbed "Wireless Woodstock".

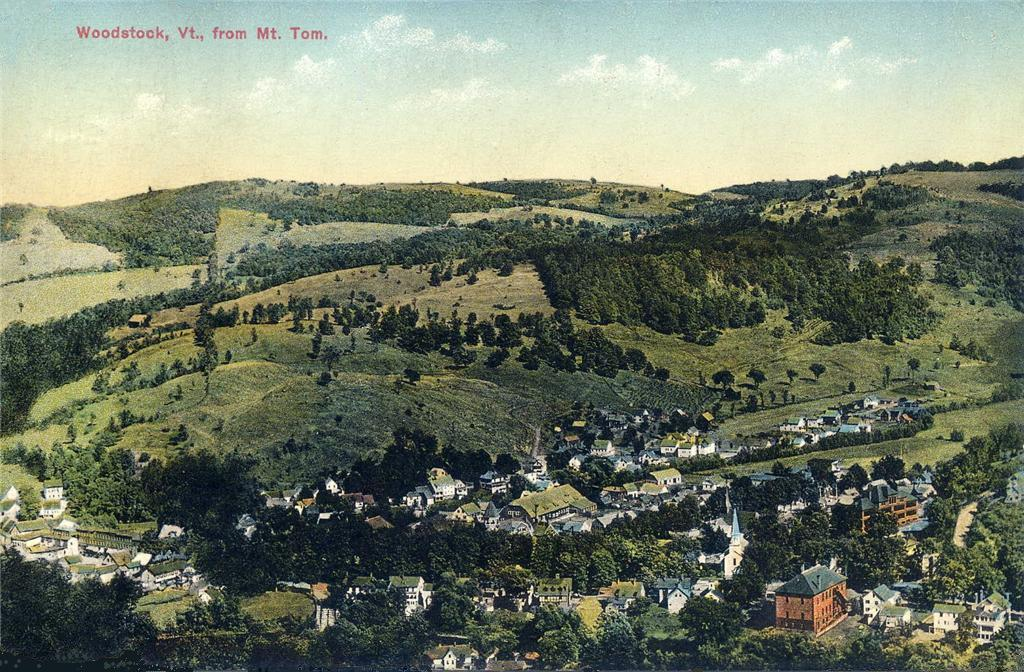
Village from Mount Tom in 1913

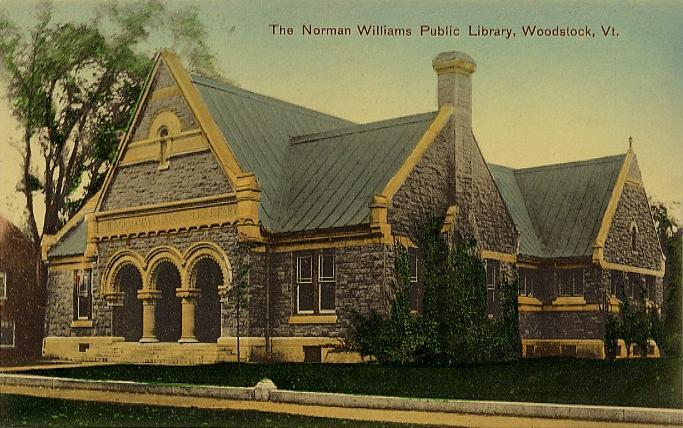
Norman Williams Public Library c. 1910, built in 1883–1884

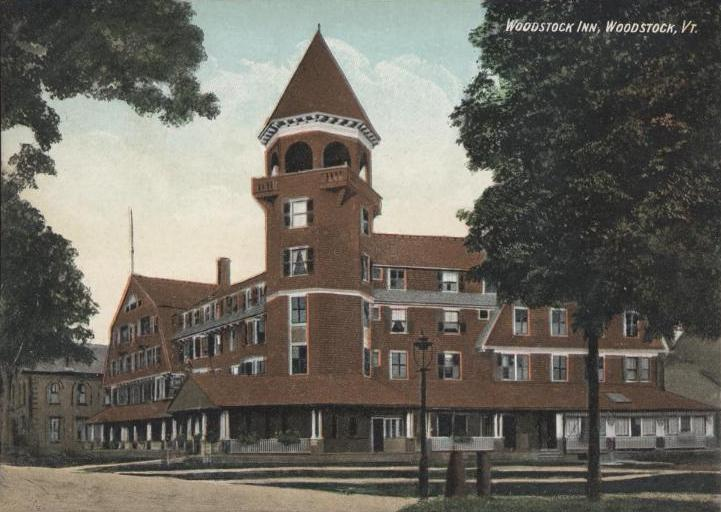
Original Woodstock Inn in 1907, open from 1892 to the late 1960s

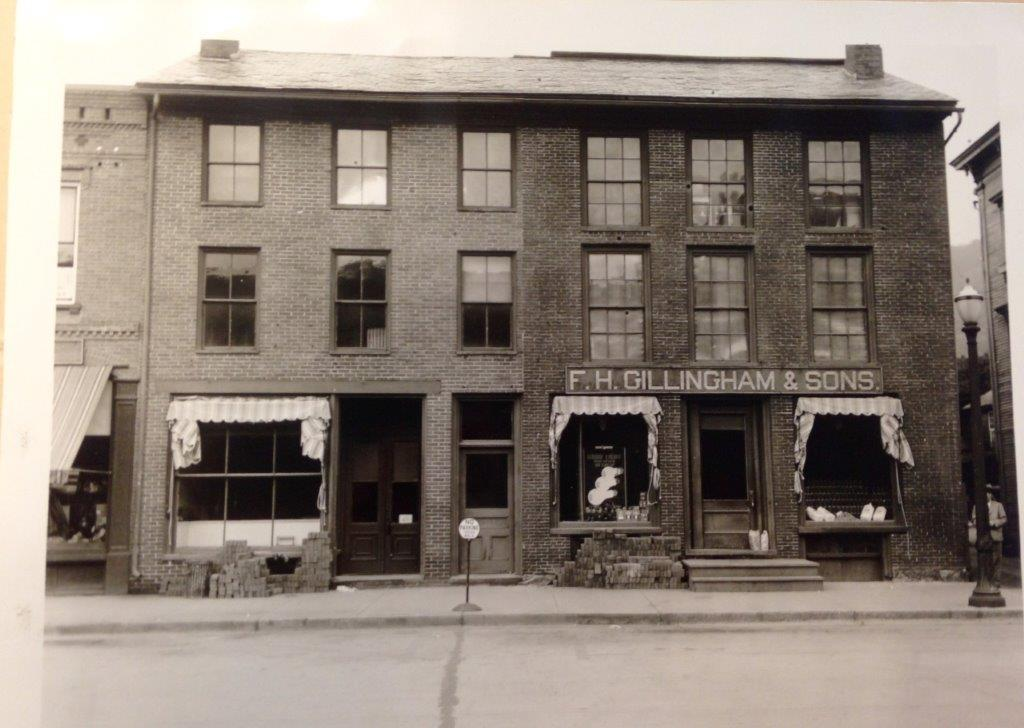
F. H. Gillingham & Sons, Elm Street, early 1900s

== Layout and design ==
In his City Life: Urban Expectations in a New World, Canadian author and architect Witold Rybczynski extensively analyzes the layout of the town and the informal and unwritten rules which determined it. According to Rybczynski:

The overall plan seems to have been dictated by the site: a narrow, flat valley hemmed in by the sweeping curve of the Ottauqueechee River on one side and a small creek on the other. The green was laid out lengthwise on the narrow peninsula between the river and the creek, allowing for many plots to have rear gardens running down to the riverbank. ... The builders of Woodstock were aware that important buildings needed important sites. The Episcopalian church is at the head of the green, the Methodist farther down, and the Congregationalist church artfully closes the vista of Pleasant Street where it dead-ends into Elm Street. ... The pride of place, on the green, is shared by private homes on one side, and the courthouse and the Eagle Hotel on the other. Stores, banks, the post office and other businesses are located on two streets adjacent to but not actually on the green. This is a subtle sort of urban design, but it is design, design that proceeds not from a predetermined master plan, but from the process of building itself. A rough framework is established, with individual builders adapting as they come along. If Parisian planning in the grand manner can be likened to carefully scored symphonic music, the New England town is like ... very restrained jazz. ... [L]ike jazz, it involves improvisation, and as in jazz, this does not mean that the result is accidental or that there are no rules.

The author goes on to explicate some of the informal rules, such as that buildings stand close to the sidewalk, in the case of businesses, or ten to fourteen feet behind for homes; that plots are generally deep and narrow, keeping street frontages roughly equivalent; commercial buildings stand side by side, with only important buildings with a public function—the library or courthouse, for instance—being free-standing objects. Rybczynsk points out that there is no zoning in Woodstock, and "buildings with different functions sat—and still sit today—side by side on the same streets", with practical exceptions such as the slaughterhouse and the gasworks.

The Rockefellers have had an enormous impact on the overall character of the town as it exists today. They helped preserve the 19th century architecture and the rural feel. In the late 1960s they tore down the landmark Woodstock Inn, a Victorian treasure reconstructed in 1892 from the old Eagle Hotel, which served as a center point for the town, and built a charming neo-colonial edifice farther back from the street. Laurance and Mary French Rockefeller also had the village's power lines buried underground. To protect their ridgeline views, the town adopted an ordinance creating a Scenic Ridgeline District in order to protect the aesthetics and the views of the town. It was updated in 2007.

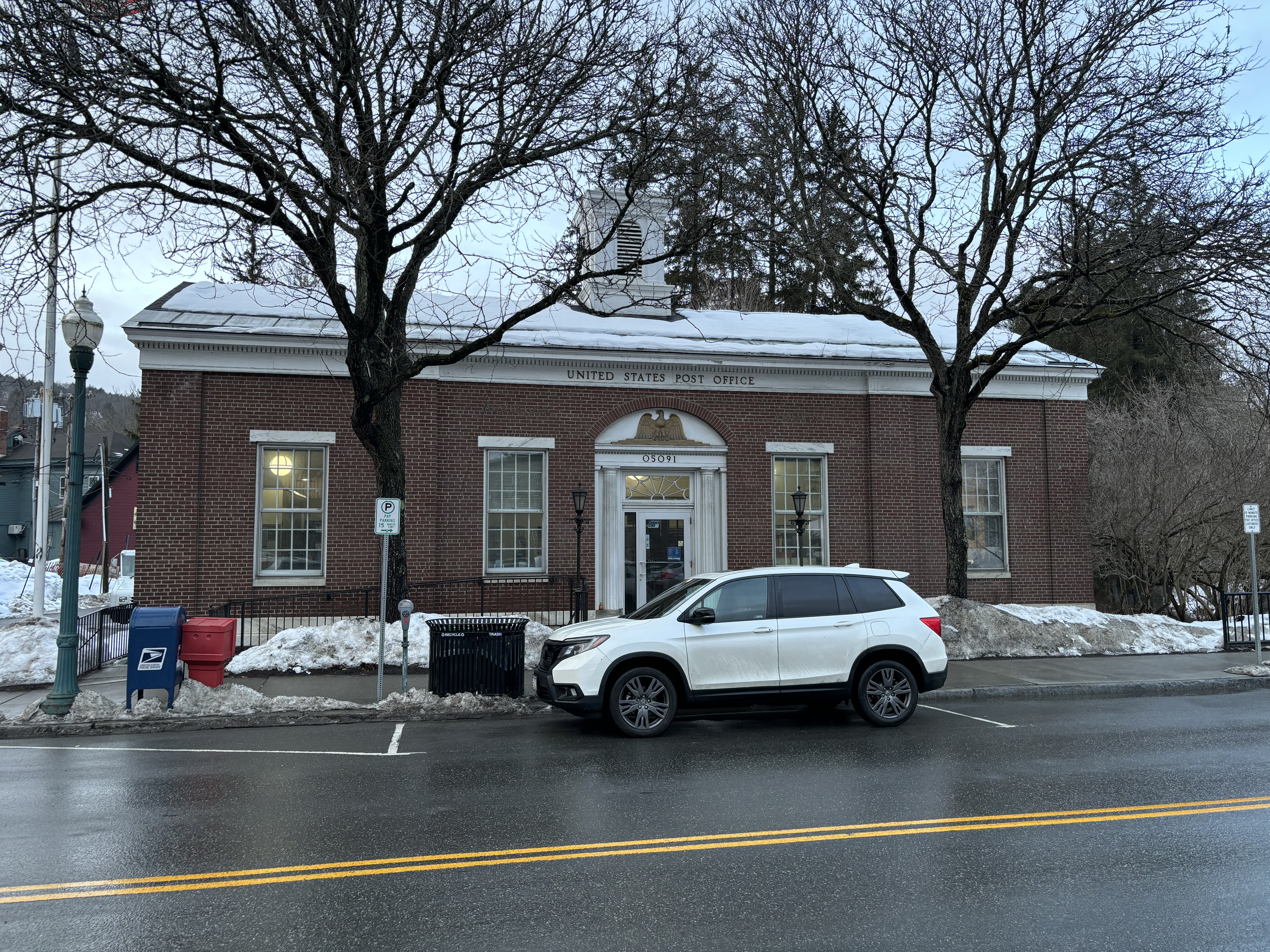
US Post Office

Woodstock was named "The Prettiest Small Town in America" by the Ladies Home Journal magazine, and in 2011, North and South Park Street and one block of Elm Street won an award for great streetscape by the American Planning Association's "Great Places in America" program. APA looks at street form and composition, street character and personality and the overall street environment and sustainable practices.

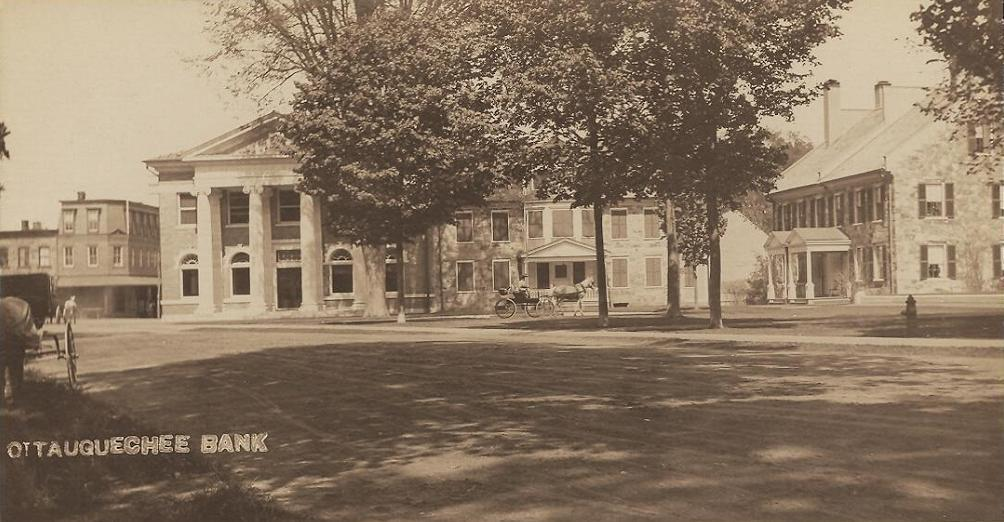
Town center c. 1905

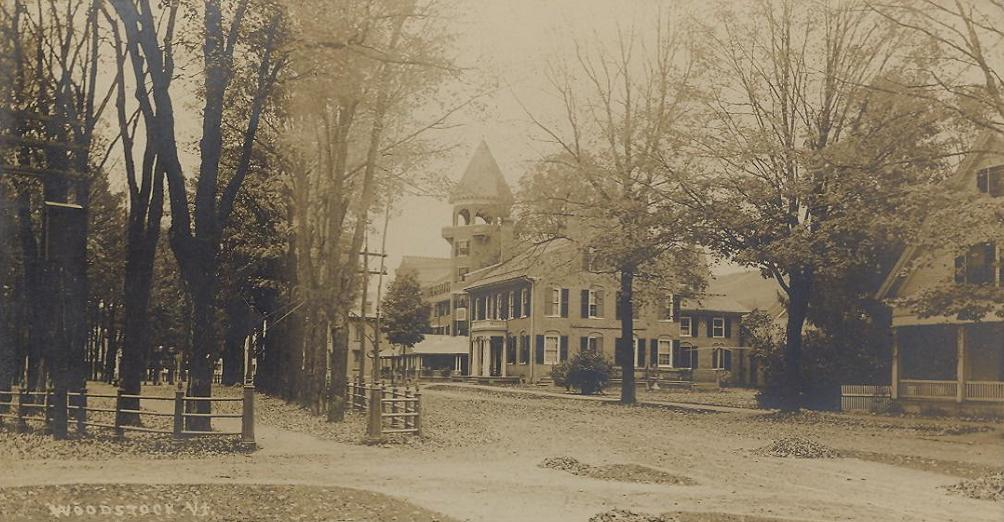
Street scene in 1906

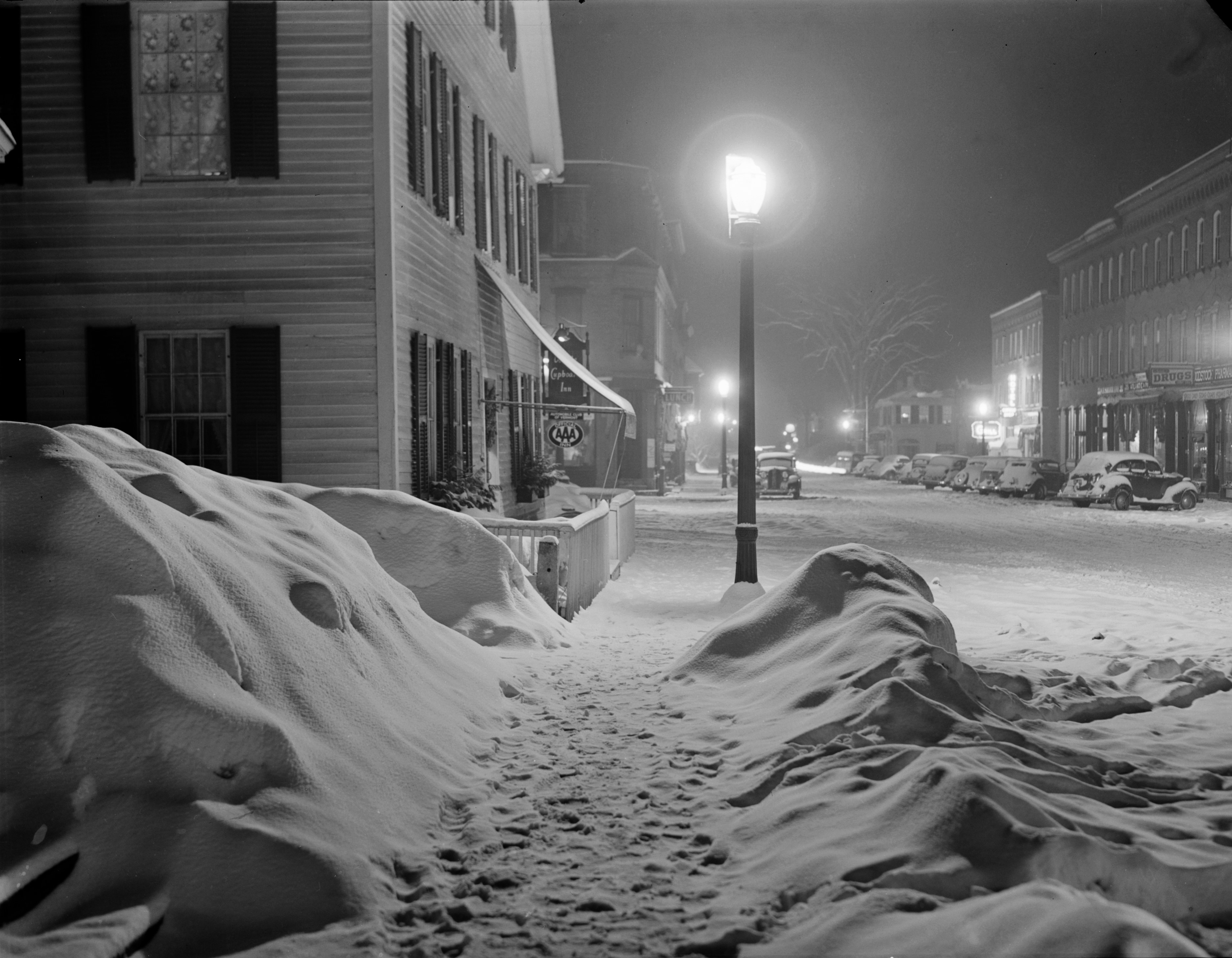
Snowy night in 1940

== Geography ==
According to the United States Census Bureau, the town has a total area of 44.6 square miles (115.6 km^{2}), of which 44.4 square miles (114.9 km^{2}) is land and 0.27 square miles (0.7 km^{2}), or 0.63%, is water. The Ottauquechee River flows through the town.

Woodstock is crossed by U.S. Route 4, Vermont Route 12 and Vermont Route 106. Interstate 89 does not pass through the town, it is served by exit 1 in nearby Quechee. It is bordered by the town of Pomfret to the north, Hartford to the northeast, Hartland to the east, Reading to the south, and Bridgewater to the west.

Woodstock is a three-hour drive from Boston and is 250 miles (400 km) away from New York City. It is easily accessible via car or plane to Rutland or Lebanon Airports. Vermont Translines operates a daily intercity bus route between Rutland and Lebanon, stopping in Woodstock along the way. The closest regular public transportation hubs are in White River Junction (12 miles (19 km) east) and Rutland (48 miles (77 km) west).

=== Climate ===
This climatic region is typified by large seasonal temperature differences, with warm to hot (and often humid) summers and cold (sometimes severely cold) winters. According to the Köppen Climate Classification system, Woodstock has a humid continental climate, abbreviated "Dfb" on climate maps.

Climate data for Woodstock, Vermont (1991–2020 normals, extremes 1892–present)
Month	Jan	Feb	Mar	Apr	May	Jun	Jul	Aug	Sep	Oct	Nov	Dec	Year
Record high °F (°C)	67 (19)	66 (19)	83 (28)	93 (34)	95 (35)	99 (37)	104 (40)	100 (38)	96 (36)	88 (31)	80 (27)	71 (22)	104 (40)
Mean maximum °F (°C)	49 (9)	51 (11)	61 (16)	79 (26)	87 (31)	91 (33)	92 (33)	91 (33)	87 (31)	78 (26)	67 (19)	53 (12)	94 (34)
Mean daily maximum °F (°C)	29.5 (−1.4)	32.8 (0.4)	41.0 (5.0)	55.0 (12.8)	68.1 (20.1)	76.9 (24.9)	81.6 (27.6)	80.1 (26.7)	73.0 (22.8)	59.2 (15.1)	46.4 (8.0)	35.2 (1.8)	56.6 (13.7)
Daily mean °F (°C)	18.4 (−7.6)	20.7 (−6.3)	29.9 (−1.2)	43.2 (6.2)	55.4 (13.0)	64.8 (18.2)	69.5 (20.8)	67.7 (19.8)	60.2 (15.7)	47.4 (8.6)	36.2 (2.3)	25.4 (−3.7)	44.9 (7.2)
Mean daily minimum °F (°C)	7.3 (−13.7)	8.5 (−13.1)	18.7 (−7.4)	31.4 (−0.3)	42.7 (5.9)	52.6 (11.4)	57.4 (14.1)	55.4 (13.0)	47.3 (8.5)	35.5 (1.9)	26.1 (−3.3)	15.6 (−9.1)	33.2 (0.7)
Mean minimum °F (°C)	−15 (−26)	−12 (−24)	−3 (−19)	19 (−7)	29 (−2)	38 (3)	46 (8)	44 (7)	33 (1)	23 (−5)	12 (−11)	−4 (−20)	−18 (−28)
Record low °F (°C)	−38 (−39)	−43 (−42)	−27 (−33)	2 (−17)	17 (−8)	29 (−2)	35 (2)	29 (−2)	19 (−7)	9 (−13)	−16 (−27)	−38 (−39)	−43 (−42)
Average precipitation inches (mm)	2.85 (72)	2.65 (67)	3.19 (81)	3.50 (89)	3.61 (92)	4.11 (104)	3.92 (100)	3.68 (93)	3.59 (91)	4.57 (116)	3.59 (91)	3.19 (81)	42.45 (1,078)
Average extreme snow depth inches (cm)	12 (30)	16 (41)	13 (33)	4 (10)	0 (0)	0 (0)	0 (0)	0 (0)	0 (0)	1 (2.5)	3 (7.6)	11 (28)	19 (48)
Source: NOAA

== Demographics ==
Historical population
Census	Pop.	Note	%±
1790	1,605		—
1800	2,132		32.8%
1810	2,672		25.3%
1820	2,610		−2.3%
1830	3,044		16.6%
1840	3,315		8.9%
1850	3,041		−8.3%
1860	3,062		0.7%
1870	2,910		−5.0%
1880	2,815		−3.3%
1890	2,545		−9.6%
1900	2,557		0.5%
1910	2,545		−0.5%
1920	2,370		−6.9%
1930	2,469		4.2%
1940	2,512		1.7%
1950	2,613		4.0%
1960	2,786		6.6%
1970	2,608		−6.4%
1980	3,214		23.2%
1990	3,212		−0.1%
2000	3,232		0.6%
2010	3,048		−5.7%
2020	3,005		−1.4%
U.S. Decennial Census

As of the census of 2010, there were 3,048 people, 1,388 households, and 877 families residing in the town. The population density was 72.6 people per square mile (28.0/km^{2}). There were 1,775 housing units at an average density of 39.9 per square mile (15.4/km^{2}). The racial makeup of the town was 98.08% White, 0.40% Black or African American, 0.22% Native American, 0.62% Asian, 0.25% from other races, and 0.43% from two or more races. Hispanic or Latino of any race were 0.80% of the population.

There were 1,388 households, out of which 26.4% had children under the age of 18 living with them, 52.7% were couples living together and joined in either marriage or civil union, 8.1% had a female householder with no husband present, and 36.8% were non-families. 29.7% of all households were made up of individuals, and 11.3% had someone living alone who was 65 years of age or older. The average household size was 2.24 and the average family size was 2.79.

In the town, the population was spread out, with 20.7% under the age of 18, 4.9% from 18 to 24, 23.9% from 25 to 44, 31.7% from 45 to 64, and 18.8% who were 65 years of age or older. The median age was 45 years. For every 100 females, there were 94.0 males. For every 100 females age 18 and over, there were 90.6 males.

The median income for a household in the town was $47,143, and the median income for a family was $57,330. Males had a median income of $33,229 versus $26,769 for females. The per capita income for the town was $28,326. About 4.3% of families and 6.4% of the population were below the poverty line, including 8.3% of those under age 18 and 3.7% of those age 65 or over.

== Arts and culture ==
=== Annual cultural events ===
- The annual Bookstock literary festival is held in June on and around the central village green and features regional, national and international authors and poets. Past speakers include Julia Alvarez, Richard Blanco, Billy Collins, Ed Koren, Sy Montgomery, Valerie Plame, Richard Russo, Ocean Vuong.
- The annual Harvest Weekend at the Billings Farm and Museum is held in October and includes a husking bee, barn dance, and 19th century harvest activities.
- The annual Wassail Weekend is held in early December.

=== Tourism ===
The Billings Farm & Museum is a local tourist attraction. The land and farmhouse were owned by Laurance Rockefeller and his wife Mary French Rockefeller. The farm and museum include an operating dairy farm and a restored 1890 farm house.

F. H. Gillingham & Sons, a general store located in its original building at 16 Elm Street, is another local tourist attraction. The store was established in 1886 by Frank Henry Gillingham.

== Parks and recreation ==
The Marsh-Billings-Rockefeller National Historical Park is located in Woodstock, and is the only unit of the United States National Park System in Vermont (except for the Appalachian Trail). The park preserves the site where Frederick Billings established a managed forest and a progressive dairy farm.

== Education ==
Woodstock is served by Woodstock Elementary School, The Prosper Valley School, and Woodstock Union High School & Middle School. The schools are part of the Mountain Views Supervisory Union.

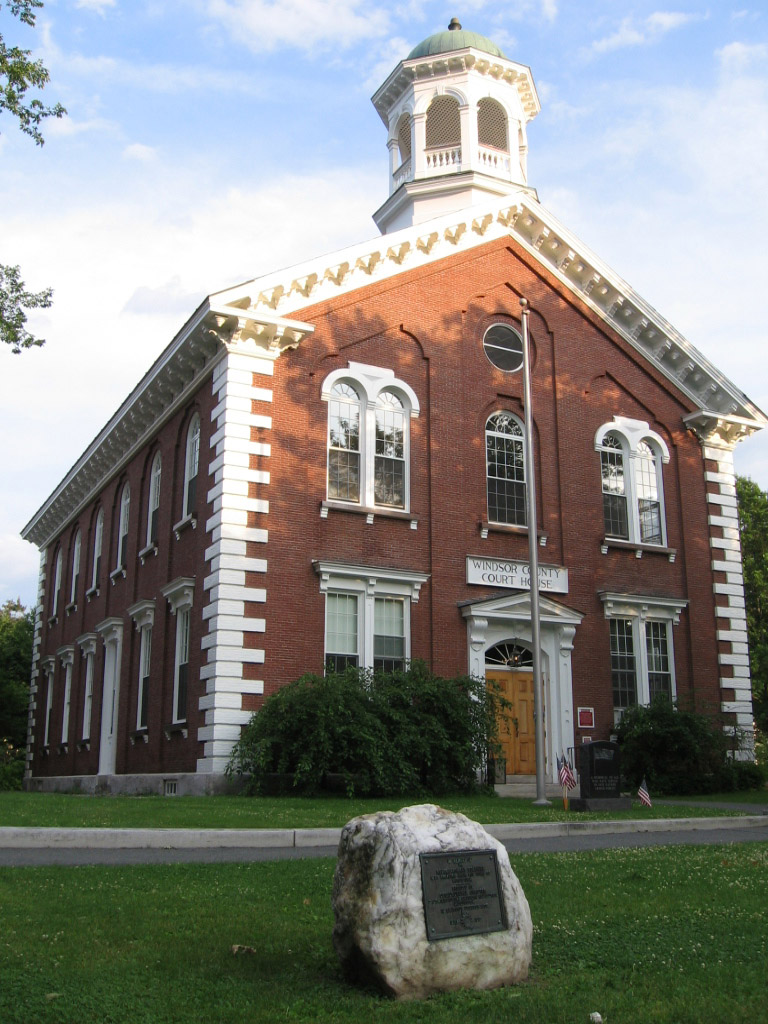
Windsor County Courthouse

== Notable people ==
- Fred C. Ainsworth, U.S. Army surgeon and Adjutant General
- Ivan Albright, artist
- Benjamin Allen, politician
- Nicholas Baylies, Associate Justice of the Vermont Supreme Court
- Franklin S. Billings, 60th governor of Vermont
- Franklin S. Billings Jr., Chief Justice Vermont Supreme Court
- Franklin Noble Billings, businessman and brother of Frederick H. Billings
- Frederick H. Billings, lawyer, financier and President of the Northern Pacific Railway
- Keegan Bradley, PGA Tour golfer
- Richard M. Brett, conservationist and author
- Isaac Bullard (Vermont religious leader)
- Frank H. Chapman, US Marshal for Vermont
- Sylvester Churchill, journalist
- Jacob Collamer, politician
- Philip Cummings, lecturer on world affairs
- Thomas M. Debevoise, Vermont Attorney General, Dean of Vermont Law School
- George Dewey, admiral
- Maud Durbin, actress and wife of Otis Skinner
- Harold "Duke" Eaton Jr., Supreme Court Justice, State of Vermont
- Elon Farnsworth, Attorney General of Michigan
- Robert Hager, television journalist
- Benjamin Tyler Henry, gunsmith and manufacturer
- Rebecca Hammond Lard, poet from Indiana
- John Clarence Lee, president of St. Lawrence University; president and vice president of Lombard University
- Charles Marsh, U.S. congressman
- George Perkins Marsh, environmentalist
- Joseph A. Mower, general
- Hiram Powers, sculptor
- Origen D. Richardson, politician
- Laurance Rockefeller, American businessman and conservationist. Financier of the Woodstock Inn & Resort
- Otis Skinner, actor
- Hilda L. Stone, bootlegger (born in Taftsville)
- Benjamin Swan, longest serving Vermont State Treasurer
- Andrew Tracy, U.S. congressman
- Gwen Verdon, dancer and actress
- Peter T. Washburn, 31st governor of Vermont
- Hezekiah Williams, U.S. congressman
- Norman Williams, Vermont Auditor of Accounts and Secretary of State of Vermont
- Paul Watson, Conservationist, author and television star
- Daphne Zuniga, film and television actress

== In popular culture ==
- Several movies have been filmed in or around Woodstock, including Dr. Cook's Garden (1971), Ghost Story (1981) and Funny Farm (1988). It is also the basis for Whittleton Creek, a fictional Vermont town which features in the 2018 video game Hitman 2.

== Sites of interest ==
- Billings Farm & Museum
- Lincoln Covered Bridge, built in 1877
- Marsh-Billings-Rockefeller National Historical Park
- F. H. Gillingham & Sons
- Middle Covered Bridge, built in 1969
- Taftsville Covered Bridge, built in 1836
- First Congregational Church of Woodstock, Vermont
- Town Hall Theatre
- Woodstock Historical Society & Dana House Museum

== Related ==
- Woodstock Observer
- Woodstock Railway
- Billings Library, University of Vermont
