= Robert Hager =

American television journalist

Robert Hager is an analyst and a retired correspondent for the US television network NBC News. Hager started his journalism career in radio before moving to network news. He began his work at NBC in June 1969, covering the Vietnam War. He worked as a regular correspondent for NBC Nightly News for 35 years, before retiring from daily reporting in November 2004.

== Biography ==
=== Early life ===
Hager was raised in Woodstock, Vermont, United States. He was first drawn to journalism after being bedridden due to an ear infection during the summer after fifth grade. With nothing to do, he listened "all day long" to the radio, and "developed a love for news and sports."

=== Career ===
After graduating from Dartmouth College in 1960, Hager began his career by reporting for radio stations in Lexington, North Carolina and Raleigh, North Carolina. He moved on to local television soon after, reporting for WBTV in Charlotte, North Carolina and NBC-owned WRC-TV in Washington, D.C., before landing a job at NBC News.

Hager started out his career as a foreign correspondent in June 1969, reporting on the Vietnam War. He was soon assigned to NBC's Berlin bureau, where he continued to cover other foreign trouble spots, including the overthrow of the Iranian Shah in 1979 and the 1989 invasion of Panama by U.S. troops. Hager also covered four Olympic games for NBC, reporting from Germany during the Black September terrorist attacks of the 1972 Summer Olympics in Munich. In 1984, he was arrested while reporting from the Democratic National Convention in San Francisco.

During the latter part of his career, Hager's focus shifted from foreign affairs to a wide range of domestic issues. Hager persuaded NBC to relocate him to the Washington, D.C. bureau, but because all of the traditional political beats had already been filled, he decided to mold himself as a "consumer reporter." Hager had a unique sense of urgency in his reporting style which helped him carve out a niche in the areas of weather and transportation, aviation in particular. He reported on many major airline incidents, including TWA Flight 800, the September 11 attacks, and Pan Am Flight 103. He also covered many of the major hurricanes that hit the United States during his 35-year tenure. During his years at the D.C. bureau, Hager became one of the most visible reporters on television.

Even though he retired from daily reporting on November 5, 2004, Hager continued to file occasional reports for NBC News. He returned to the air to help cover the 2006 coal mine disaster in West Virginia. Because of his expertise in aviation accidents, Hager came back again to NBC Nightly News to report on the August 27, 2006 crash of Comair Flight 5191 and the October 12, 2006 plane crash that killed New York Yankees pitcher Corey Lidle. In March 2014, he again returned to NBC to report on the loss of Malaysia Airlines Flight 370. Hager returned to the air again in July 2014 (on MSNBC) to provide his expertise and commentary on the shoot down of Malaysia Airlines Flight 17, in which 298 people died.

On October 14, 2012, Hager covered the Redbull Stratos high altitude skydive, broadcast on the Discovery channel and streamed live online.

In the 2019 Drama, The Irishman, Robert Hager is briefly mentioned as a broadcaster.

== Personal life ==
Hager and his wife, Honore, have three daughters and 8 grandchildren, (youngest to oldest) Derek DeAngelo, Patrick Henegan, Brady DeAngelo, John Nossiff, Lilly Dukich, Peter Nossiff, Bobby Dukich, and Aaron Nossiff. He currently resides in Woodstock, VT. One of his daughters, Christina Hager, was a general assignment reporter at Boston's WBZ-TV. His other daughter, Jennifer Hager is a vice president at Kate Spade New York, and his other daughter, Gabrielle Hager was a lawyer at General Electric and is now a partner at Nossiff Law Firm LLP.

== Awards ==
In 1990, Hager was inducted into the Silver Circle honor society, which was established by the National Academy of Television Arts & Sciences to honor journalists who have dedicated 25 years of service to broadcast news. In 2000, the United Nations Environment Programme elected Hager to its Global 500 Roll of Honour in recognition of "his outstanding contributions to the protection of the environment." He was selected for his reporting on major climatic events, including "ozone depletion and global warming", as well as his coverage of the scandals that rocked the United States Environmental Protection Agency in the early 1980s.
