= Damon Hall =

- U.S. National Register of Historic Places
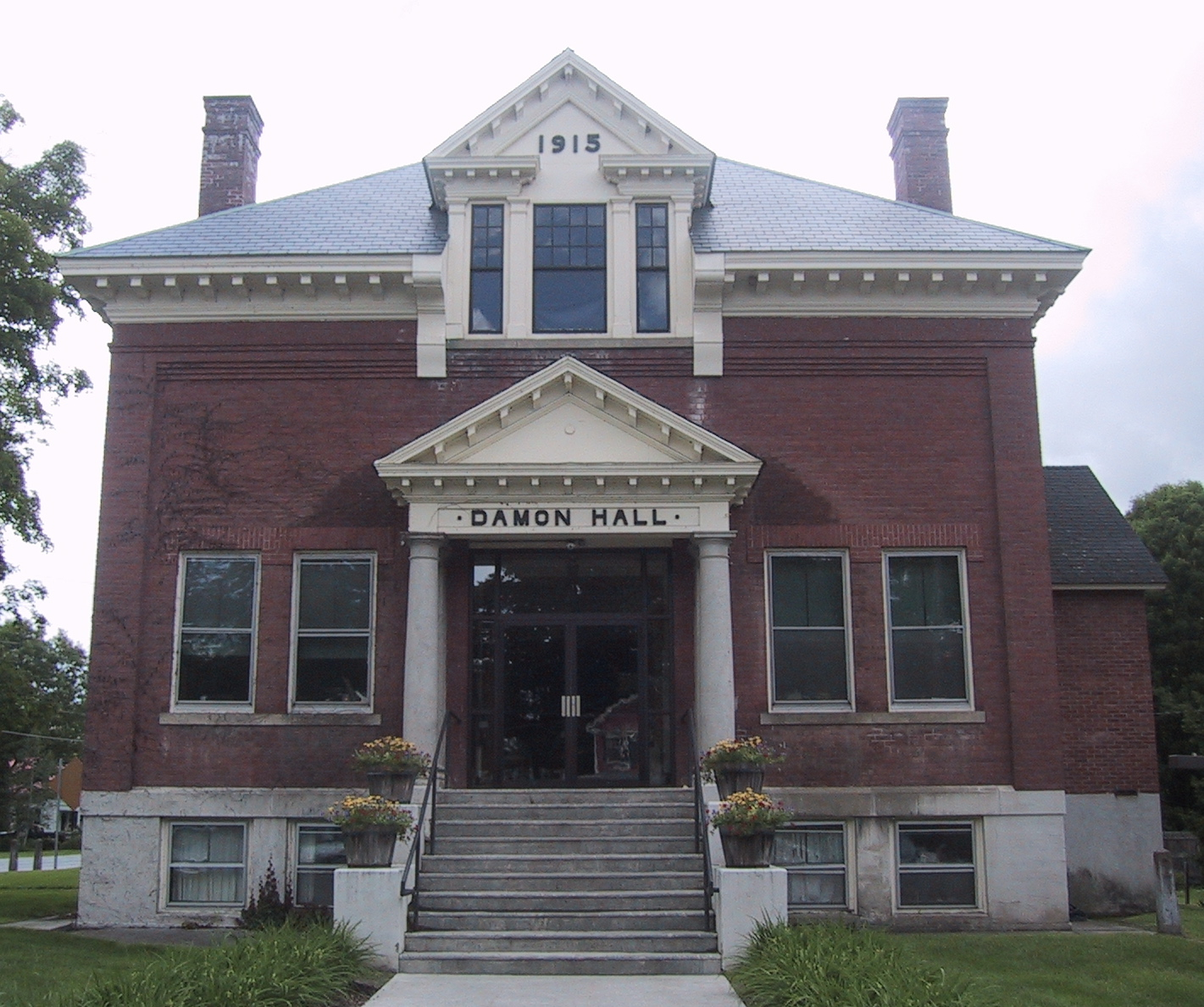

- Location within Vermont Location within the United States
- Location: US 5 and VT 12, Hartland, Vermont
- Coordinates: 43°32′29″N 72°24′1″W
- Area: 0.8 acres (0.32 ha)
- Built: 1914
- Architect: Beckwith, H.F.
- Architectural style: Colonial Revival
- NRHP reference No.: 88000654
- Added to NRHP: June 2, 1988

Damon Hall, also known as Hartland Town Hall, is located at the junction of United States Route 5, Quechee Road, and Vermont Route 12 in the village center of Hartland, Vermont. Built in 1914-15 as a memorial to the locally prominent businessman William E. Damon, it is a fine local example of Colonial Revival architecture, and has served the town in many capacities since its construction. It was listed on the National Register of Historic Places in 1988.

== Description and history ==
Damon Hall stands facing east toward the principal intersection of Hartland village. It is fronted to the east by Durphy Road, which forms the west side of small triangular green with Quechee Road and Skunk Hollow Road (VT 12), with US 5 running east and south from the green's southeast corner. The hall is a 1-1/2 story masonry structure, built out of brick with concrete trim, and set on a concrete foundation. It is covered by a dormered hip roof with a modillioned cornice. The main entrance is set in the east-facing short side, frame by pilasters and Tuscan columns which support an entablature and modillioned gable. On either side are two sash windows, which have shared concrete lintels and sills. The building corners are articulated by brick piers, which rise to a band of corbelling and a stringcourse of projecting brick. The building interior is dominated by a central auditorium, with stage at the far end and balcony at the near end. Town offices are housed in corner rooms on the second floor, with additional rooms behind the stage on both floors.

The hall was built in 1914-15 to a design by H. F. Beckwith of Claremont, New Hampshire. It was a gift to the town by the heirs of William E. Damon, a prominent local businessman who died in 1911. It was built on a site that had previously been occupied (since 1795) by a hotel. One of the front rooms originally house the town library, and the hall has been used for town meetings as well as theatrical productions and other performance events. The building is an unusually sophisticated example of Colonial Revival architecture for what was, at the time of its construction, a small community of limited means.

== See also ==
- National Register of Historic Places listings in Windsor County, Vermont
