= Hartland (CDP), Vermont =

Census-designated place in Vermont, United States

Hartland, Vermont
- Census-designated place
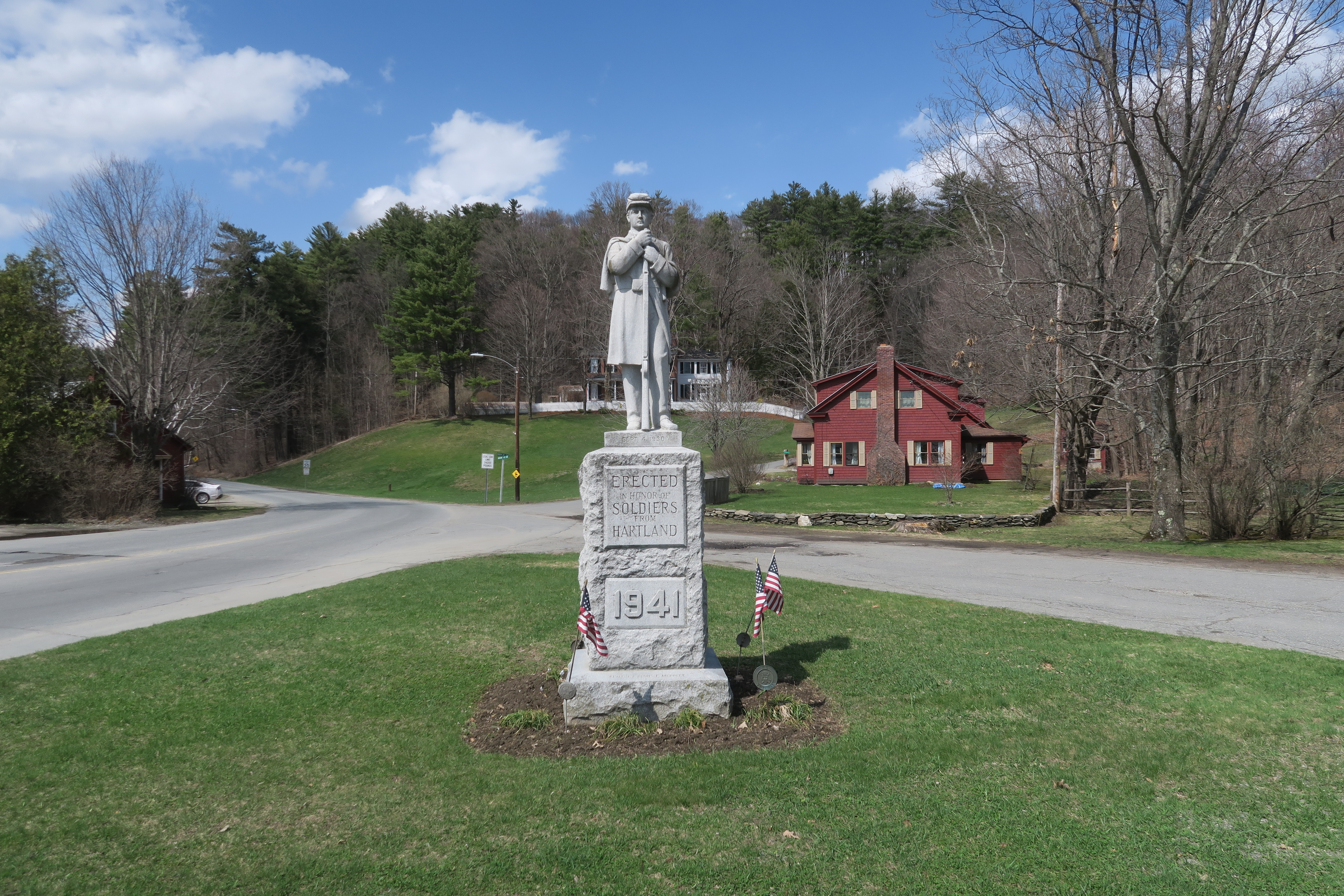
- War Memorial

- Location in Windsor County and the state of Vermont.
- Coordinates: 43°32′32″N 72°24′00″W
- Country: United States
- State: Vermont
- County: Windsor

Area
  - Total: 1.1 sq mi (2.8 km^{2})
  - Land: 1.1 sq mi (2.8 km^{2})
  - Water: 0 sq mi (0.0 km^{2})
- Elevation: 581 ft (177 m)

Population (2010)
  - Total: 380
  - Density: 350/sq mi (140/km^{2})
- Time zone: UTC-5 (Eastern (EST))
  - Summer (DST): UTC-4 (EDT)
- ZIP code: 05048
- Area code: 802
- FIPS code: 50-32350
- GNIS feature ID: 2586637

Hartland is a census-designated place (CDP) that comprises the central village of the town of Hartland, Windsor County, Vermont, United States. As of the 2010 census, the population of the CDP was 380, compared to 3,393 for the entire town of Hartland.

== Geography ==
Hartland is located at the intersection of U.S. Route 5 and Vermont Route 12 in eastern Windsor County. Route 12 travels north to Woodstock, while Route 5 heads north to White River Junction. The two roads travel south in a concurrency to Windsor. Interstate 91 passes east of the village, with access via Exit 9.
