= Downer T. Bramble =

American politician

Downer Tenney Bramble (February 28, 1832 in Hartland, Vermont – October 9, 1887 in Watertown, Dakota Territory) was an American pioneer businessman and politician in the Dakota Territory.

Bramble was born into a Vermont farming family in Hartland on February 28, 1832. At the age of 17 he moved to Nashville, Tennessee to work in a drug store owned by his older brothers Gilman and George; later he and Gilman opened a branch store in Memphis. In 1857 he moved to Ponca, Nebraska, where he briefly operated a grocery, and served in the 5th Nebraska Territorial Legislature. He married a woman named Lucinda Brown, but she died 6 months later, and Bramble loaded up a wagon full of goods and moved to the frontier at Yankton in what was to be the Dakota Territory (organized in 1861).

While visiting Connecticut in February 1861, Bramble married Martha Perry; she died 16 months later in Yankton, followed a few months later by their infant daughter, Carrie. In January 1866 he remarried, this time to Virginia Van Der Hule, with whom he had two children, Harry Jesse and Frank Litchfield Bramble (1871-1966).

At Yankton, Bramble established a general store, bringing goods by ox cart from Sioux City. This became the firm of Bramble, Miner and Co. Bramble operated freight lines and ferries, owned the largest warehouse in Yankton, helped start the bank and build the railroad. A branch store at Fort Pierre was washed away in the Great Flood of 1881, which caused such extensive damage to Bramble's enterprises that he was forced to close his store in 1882. In 1884 he was appointed receiver at the government land office in Watertown and moved his family there.

Bramble also served four terms in the Dakota Territory's territorial legislature, 3 terms (1861, 1862, 1873) on the Council and once (1866) in the House.

Bramble died of cancer in Watertown on October 9, 1887, two years before South Dakota became a state. He was buried at Yankton City Cemetery in Yankton.
