= Isaac Bullard (religious leader) =

Isaac Bullard was an early 19th-century American Pentecostal religious leader who in 1817 founded a short-lived commune in Woodstock, Vermont.

== Bibliography ==
- Ham, F. Gerald. "The prophet and the Mummyjums: Isaac Bullard and the Vermont pilgrims of 1817," The Wisconsin Magazine of History, Vol. 56, No. 4 (Summer, 1973), pp. 290–299.
