= Hartland, Vermont =

- Town
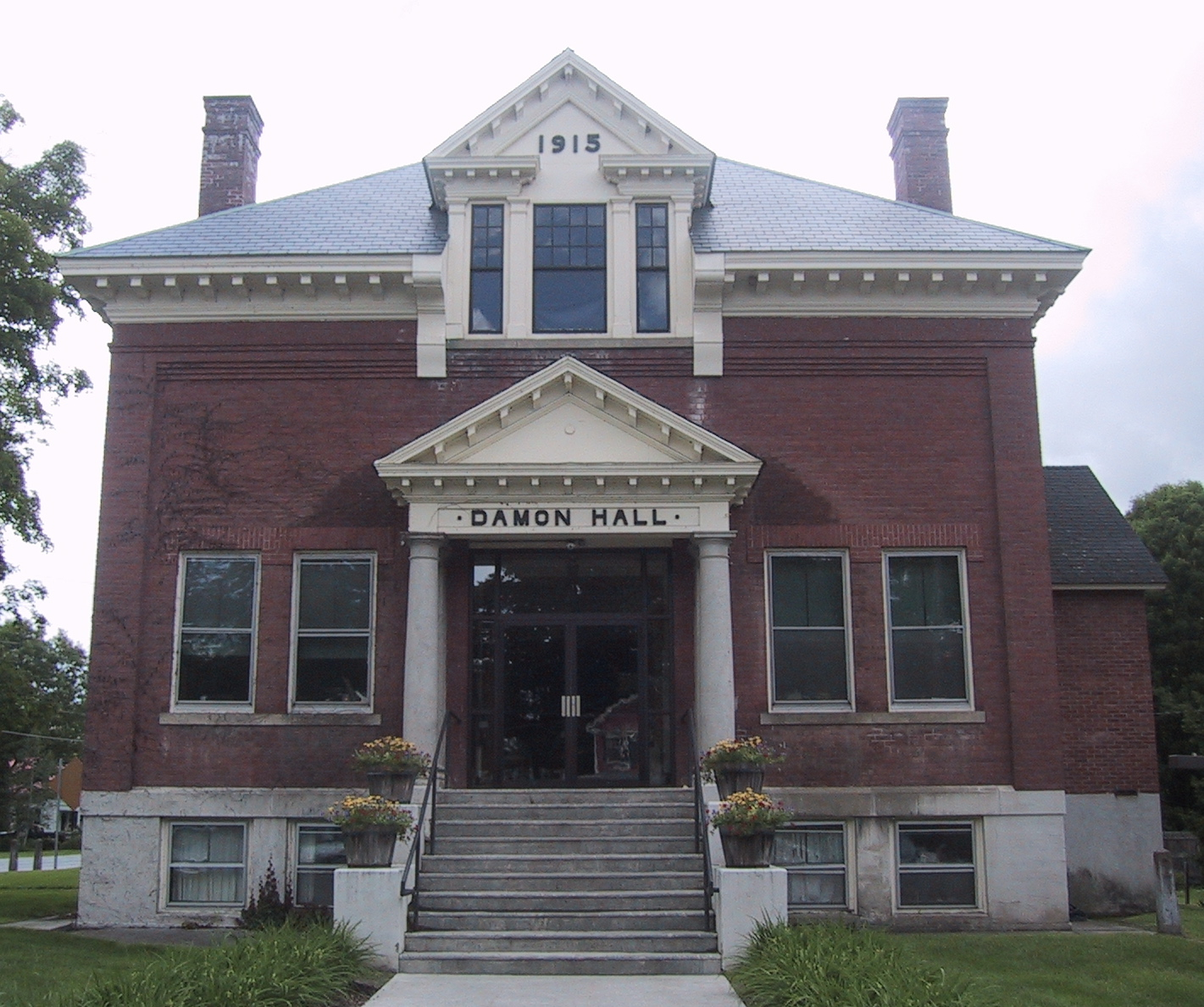
- Damon Hall, Hartland's town hall

- Location in Windsor County and the state of Vermont.
- Coordinates: 43°35′14″N 72°26′21″W
- Country: United States
- State: Vermont
- County: Windsor
- Communities: Hartland; Hartland Four Corners; North Hartland; Fieldsville; Jenneville

Area
  - Total: 45.2 sq mi (117.0 km^{2})
  - Land: 44.9 sq mi (116.4 km^{2})
  - Water: 0.23 sq mi (0.6 km^{2})
- Elevation: 1,230 ft (370 m)

Population (2020)
  - Total: 3,446
  - Density: 77/sq mi (29.6/km^{2})
- Time zone: UTC-5 (Eastern (EST))
  - Summer (DST): UTC-4 (EDT)
- ZIP Codes: 05048 (Hartland); 05049 (Hartland Four Corners); 05001 (White River Junction); 05052 (North Hartland); 05073 (Taftsville); 05089 (Windsor); 05091 (Woodstock)
- Area code: 802
- FIPS code: 50-32425
- GNIS feature ID: 1462117
- Website: hartland.govoffice.com

Hartland is a town in Windsor County, Vermont, United States. The population was 3,446 at the 2020 census. It includes the villages of Hartland, Hartland Four Corners, and North Hartland.

== History ==
Hartland, originally named Hertford, was chartered in 1761.

== Geography ==
According to the United States Census Bureau, the town has a total area of 45.2 square miles (117.0 km^{2}), of which 45.0 square miles (116.4 km^{2}) is land and 0.2 square mile (0.6 km^{2}) (0.53%) is water. The Connecticut River forms its eastern boundary, and the Ottauquechee River flows through the northern part of the town.

== Demographics ==
Historical population
Census	Pop.	Note	%±
1790	1,652		—
1800	1,960		18.6%
1810	2,352		20.0%
1820	2,553		8.5%
1830	2,503		−2.0%
1840	2,341		−6.5%
1850	2,063		−11.9%
1860	1,748		−15.3%
1870	1,710		−2.2%
1880	1,598		−6.5%
1890	1,393		−12.8%
1900	1,340		−3.8%
1910	1,316		−1.8%
1920	1,212		−7.9%
1930	1,266		4.5%
1940	1,306		3.2%
1950	1,559		19.4%
1960	1,592		2.1%
1970	1,806		13.4%
1980	2,396		32.7%
1990	2,988		24.7%
2000	3,223		7.9%
2010	3,393		5.3%
2020	3,446		1.6%
U.S. Decennial Census

As of the census of 2000, there were 3,223 people, 1,270 households, and 900 families living in the town. The population density was 71.7 people per square mile (27.7/km^{2}). There were 1,382 housing units at an average density of 30.7 per square mile (11.9/km^{2}). The racial makeup of the town was 98.57% White, 0.12% African American, 0.16% Native American, 0.43% Asian, 0.06% Pacific Islander, 0.06% from other races, and 0.59% from two or more races. Hispanic or Latino of any race were 0.62% of the population.

There were 1,270 households, out of which 33.3% had children under the age of 18 living with them, 59.5% were married couples living together, 8.4% had a female householder with no husband present, and 29.1% were non-families. 22.0% of all households were made up of individuals, and 6.9% had someone living alone who was 65 years of age or older. The average household size was 2.53 and the average family size was 2.97.

In the town, the population was spread out, with 26.1% under the age of 18, 5.1% from 18 to 24, 29.2% from 25 to 44, 27.9% from 45 to 64, and 11.8% who were 65 years of age or older. The median age was 40 years. For every 100 females, there were 101.2 males. For every 100 females age 18 and over, there were 93.7 males.

The median income for a household in the town was $49,388, and the median income for a family was $55,354. Males had a median income of $32,639 versus $26,691 for females. The per capita income for the town was $23,715. About 1.3% of families and 2.6% of the population were below the poverty line, including 2.7% of those under age 18 and 1.0% of those age 65 or over.

== Industry ==
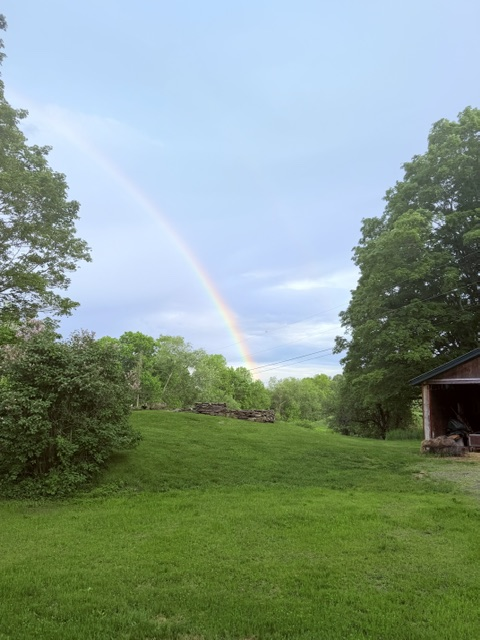
Rainbow over Icelandic sheep farm in Hartland, Vermont.

The town was home to a J. E. Ashworth & Sons blanket mill. Originally the Sturtevant woolen-mills, it was operated by water-power, had five looms, employed twelve men, and made 10,000 blankets per year. The Ottaquechee Woolen Mills in North Hartland had 1,680 spindles, sixty looms, and 75 employees.

== Notable people ==
- Victor Ambros, discoverer of miRNA, winner of many international awards
- Henry M. Bates, Vermont State Treasurer
- Downer T. Bramble, Dakota Territorial legislator
- Roger Enos, veteran of the French and Indian War and American Revolution
- George Seldes, investigative journalist and media critic
- Benjamin H. Steele, Associate Justice of the Vermont Supreme Court
- John C. Thompson, Justice of the Vermont Supreme Court
- George Tooker, figurative painter in the Magic realism and Social realism movements
- Miro Weinberger, mayor of Burlington, Vermont
- Daniel Willard, railroad executive
