= Woodstock (village), Vermont =

Woodstock, Vermont
- Village
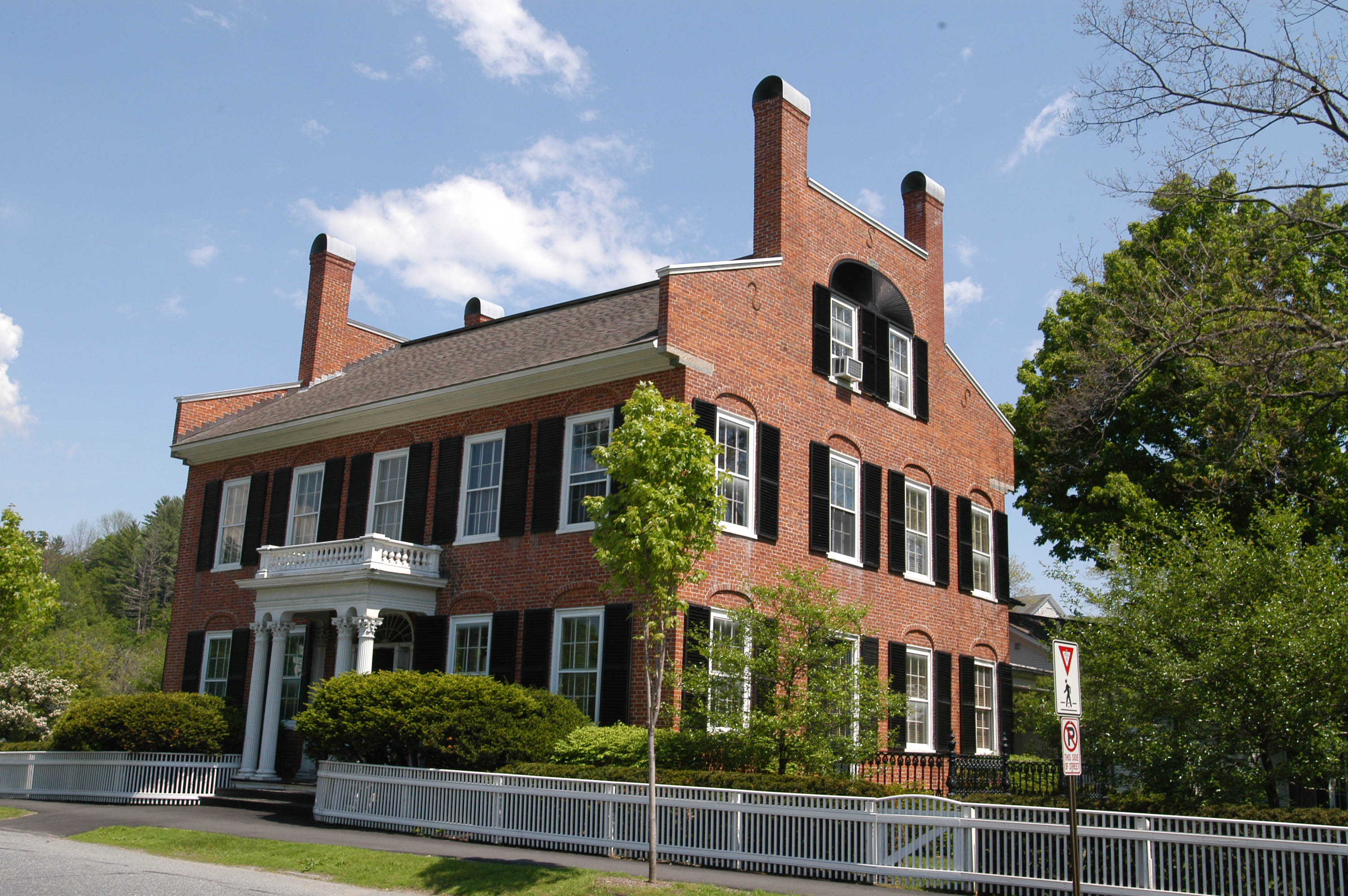
- General Lyman Mower House on the Green

- Location in Windsor County and the state of Vermont.
- Coordinates: 43°37′34″N 72°30′55″W
- Country: United States
- State: Vermont
- County: Windsor
- Town: Woodstock

Area
  - Total: 1.21 sq mi (3.14 km^{2})
  - Land: 1.18 sq mi (3.06 km^{2})
  - Water: 0.031 sq mi (0.08 km^{2})
- Elevation: 794 ft (242 m)

Population (2020)
  - Total: 900
  - Density: 762/sq mi (294.1/km^{2})
- Time zone: UTC-5 (Eastern (EST))
  - Summer (DST): UTC-4 (EDT)
- ZIP code: 05091
- Area code: 802
- FIPS code: 50-85900
- GNIS feature ID: 2378333
- Woodstock Village Historic District
- U.S. National Register of Historic Places
- U.S. Historic district
- Location: Along the Ottauquechee River, Woodstock, Vermont
- Area: 275 acres (111 ha)
- Architectural style: Colonial, Late Victorian, Romanesque Revival
- NRHP reference No.: 73000274 (original); 100005615 (increase)

Significant dates
- Added to NRHP: January 22, 1973
- Boundary increase: August 6, 2021

Woodstock is an incorporated village located within the town of Woodstock in Windsor County, Vermont, United States. As of the 2020 census, the village population was 900.

== Geography ==
According to the United States Census Bureau, the village has a total area of 1.0 square mile (2.7 km^{2}), all land. The Ottauquechee River flows through the village.

== History ==
The Woodstock Village Historic District was listed on the National Register of Historic Places in 1973. It includes the village center and additional properties along the Ottauquechee River. The district covers an area of 275 acres (111 ha) encompassing 95 buildings, sites, and structures that contribute to the historical significance of the area. The center of the district is an elliptical village green located at the junction of U.S. Route 4 and Vermont Route 106. Around the green and along the main road following the river are a number of residential, commercial, and public buildings showcasing architectural development from the late 18th to late 19th centuries. One of these buildings is The Norman Williams Public Library, built by Norman's son, Dr. Edward H. Williams, on the site where their home had stood previously. The district also includes the Billings Farm and Museum, and the George Perkins Marsh Boyhood Home, the architectural centerpiece of Marsh-Billings-Rockefeller National Historical Park, and F. H. Gillingham & Sons, the oldest, same-family operated general store in Vermont.

=== 2011 Great Place in America ===
In 2011 the Downtown Woodstock Streetscape was listed by the American Planning Association (APA) as a "2011 Great Place in America" under the "Streets" category. The APA specifically focuses on streets that are complete, meaning that the street services all forms of use and not just vehicle use.

The streets specifically recognized by the APA include North and South Park Streets, one block of Elm Street between Pleasant and Central Streets, and two blocks of Central Street between Pleasant, North Park, and South Park Streets. Woodstock features early 19th-century New England architecture. At the town's center lies "The Green," which hosts weekly farmers' markets during the summer and autumn. Known for its quaint charm, Woodstock offers a historic and lively atmosphere, making it ideal for exploring on foot.

In 2006 the State of Vermont created a district for tax credits and other state provided incentives for smart growth along the downtown streets. Currently Downtown Woodstock boasts a free trolley during the summer months that is powered by electricity generated from cow manure from local farms.

== Demographics ==
Historical population
Census	Pop.	Note	%±
1880	1,266		—
1890	1,218		−3.8%
1900	1,284		5.4%
1910	1,383		7.7%
1920	1,252		−9.5%
1930	1,312		4.8%
1940	1,325		1.0%
1950	1,326		0.1%
1960	1,415		6.7%
1970	1,154		−18.4%
1980	1,178		2.1%
1990	1,037		−12.0%
2000	977		−5.8%
2010	900		−7.9%
2020	900		0.0%
U.S. Decennial Census

As of the census of 2000, there were 977 people, 434 households, and 220 families residing in the village. The population density was 944.4 people per square mile (366.2/km^{2}). There were 558 housing units at an average density of 539.4/sq mi (209.2/km^{2}). The racial makeup of the village was 98.36% White, 0.20% Black or African American, 0.10% Native American, 0.72% Asian, 0.20% from other races, and 0.41% from two or more races. Hispanic or Latino of any race were 1.02% of the population.

There were 434 households, out of which 22.6% had children under the age of 18 living with them, 41.2% were married couples living together, 8.1% had a female householder with no husband present, and 49.1% were non-families. 41.2% of all households were made up of individuals, and 16.6% had someone living alone who was 65 years of age or older. The average household size was 2.01 and the average family size was 2.73.

In the village, the population was spread out, with 18.4% under the age of 18, 6.8% from 18 to 24, 25.8% from 25 to 44, 27.1% from 45 to 64, and 21.9% who were 65 years of age or older. The median age was 44 years. For every 100 females, there were 95.4 males. For every 100 females age 18 and over, there were 91.6 males.

The median income for a household in the village was $95,577, and the median income for a family was $109,688. Males had a median income of $72,109 versus $26,917 for females. The per capita income for the village was $90,639. About 0.1% of families and 0.3% of the population were below the poverty line, including 0.4% of those under age 18 and 0.1% of those age 65 or over.

== Related ==
- Woodstock, Vermont
- Marsh-Billings-Rockefeller National Historical Park
- National Register of Historic Places listings in Windsor County, Vermont
- Frederick H. Billings
- F. H. Gillingham & Sons
- Woodstock Railway
