= Taftsville Historic District =

Historic district in Vermont, United States

- U.S. National Register of Historic Places
- U.S. Historic district
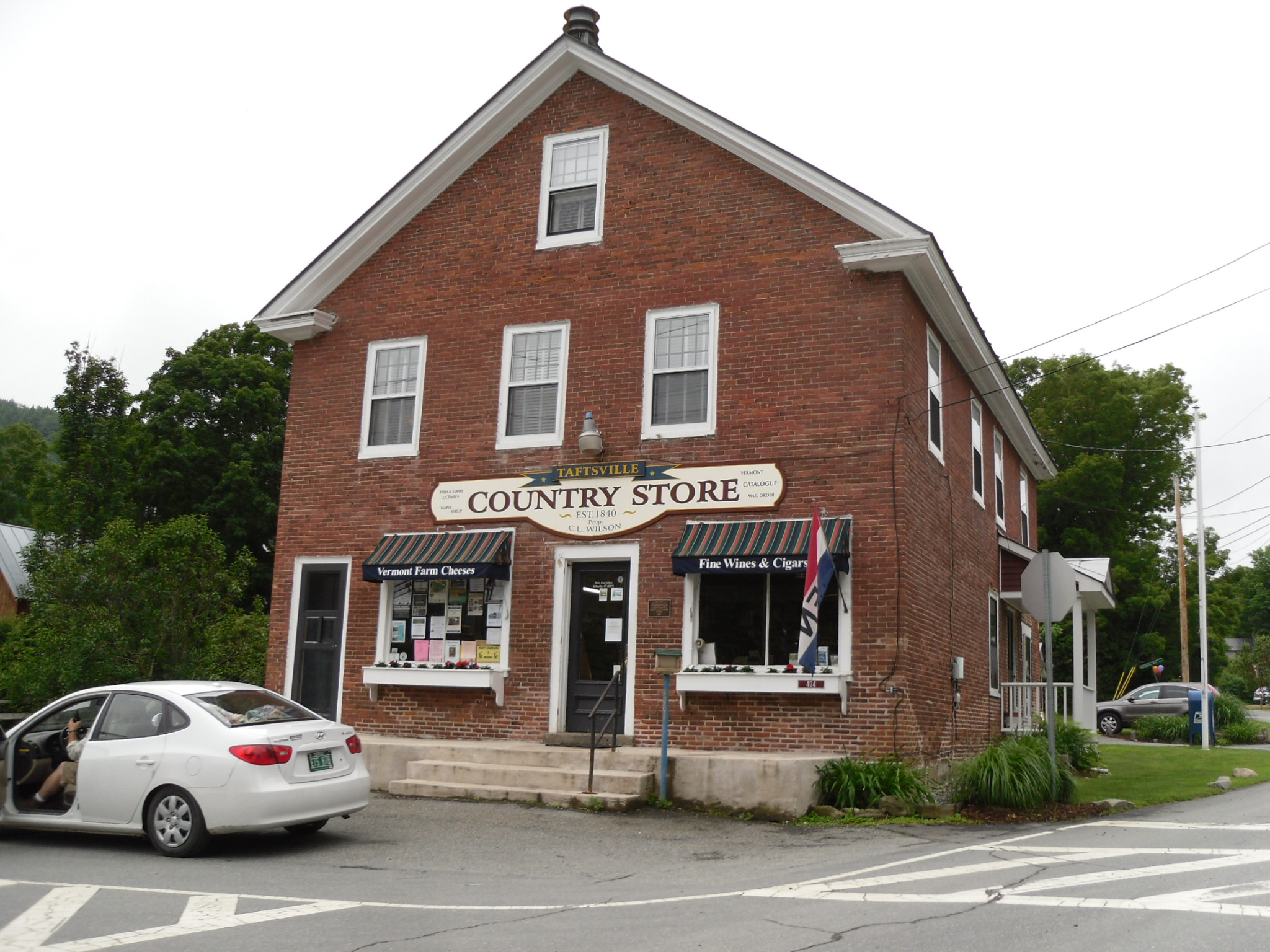
- The Taftsville Country Store

- Location within Vermont Location within the United States
- Location: Portions of US 4, Upper River Rd., Quechee Main St., all Butternut Ln., Happy Valley Rd., Sugar Hill Rd., Woodstock, Vermont, with portions in Hartford and Hartland
- Coordinates: 43°37′46″N 72°28′26″W
- Area: 202 acres (82 ha)
- Built: 1793
- Architect: Martin, Eben; Taft, D. and Sons
- Architectural style: Federal, Greek Revival, et al.
- NRHP reference No.: 01000824
- Added to NRHP: August 2, 2001

The Taftsville Historic District encompasses a historic 19th-century industrial village that is mostly in Woodstock, Vermont. Flanking the Ottauquechee River and extending up Happy Valley Road, the area developed around a metal tool factory established by members of the Taft family in 1793. Important elements from its early history include the Taftsville Store, built by the Taft family in 1840, and the Taftsville Covered Bridge, built in 1836. The district was listed on the National Register of Historic Places in 2001.

== Description and history ==
The village of Taftsville is centered around the junction of United States Route 4 and Happy Valley Road in far eastern Woodstock. It extends along secondary roads (mainly Happy Valley Road and Sugar Hill Road), and includes properties neighboring Hartland and Hartford, both just east of Woodstock. The majority of its buildings are residential in character, and were built in the 19th century. They are typically wood frame structures either 1-1/2 or 2-1/2 stories in height, although there are a few brick houses. The village's industrial past is primarily recalled by the dam across the Ottauquechee River, which now powers a hydroelectric plant on the river's southern bank, adjacent to the covered bridge. The Taftsville Store, built in 1840, is a prominent landmark on US 4, a major transport artery in the area. A former school building, now serving as a Mennonite chapel, stands on Happy Valley Road; it was built in 1911, and has Colonial Revival features.

Settlement of the village began in 1793, when Stephen Taft, a native of Uxbridge, Massachusetts arrived. He and two of his brothers dammed the river, established a sawmill on the north bank, and a metalworking shop in the south bank, producing scythes, axes, and other tools in the latter. The business was a success, and flourished into the late 19th century despite its original main building's destruction by fire in 1811. The surviving covered bridge was built in 1836 to handle increasing traffic (across an earlier footbridge), and the store was built in 1840. It is unclear if the Tafts built the store as a place to sell their wares, or as a service to their growing number of employees. The village was originally more roughly divided between Woodstock and Hartland, but a town boundary adjustment in 1851 placed most of the village into Woodstock.

== See also ==
- National Register of Historic Places listings in Windsor County, Vermont
