= List of bridges documented by the Historic American Engineering Record in Vermont =

This is a list of bridges documented by the Historic American Engineering Record in the U.S. state of Vermont.

== Bridges ==
| Survey No. | Name (as assigned by HAER) | Status | Type | Built | Documented | Carries | Crosses | Location | County | Coordinates |
|---|---|---|---|---|---|---|---|---|---|---|
| NH-6 | Bellows Falls Arch Bridge | Replaced | Steel arch | 1905 | 1979 | | Connecticut River | Bellows Falls, Vermont, and North Walpole, New Hampshire | Windham County, Vermont, and Cheshire County, New Hampshire | 43°08′17″N 72°26′54″W |
| NH-8 | Cornish–Windsor Covered Bridge | Extant | Town lattice truss | 1866 | 1984 | | Connecticut River | Windsor, Vermont, and Cornish, New Hampshire | Windsor County, Vermont, and Sullivan County, New Hampshire | 43°28′26″N 72°23′02″W |
| NH-13 | Walpole–Westminster Bridge | Replaced | Steel built-up girder | 1911 | 1988 | VT 123 / NH 123 | Connecticut River | Westminster, Vermont, and Walpole, New Hampshire | Windham County, Vermont, and Cheshire County, New Hampshire | 43°05′04″N 72°26′00″W |
| VT-1-A | E. & T. Fairbanks & Company, Two-Story Covered Bridge | Demolished | Town lattice truss | 1876 | 1969 | | Sleepers River | St. Johnsbury | Caledonia | 44°25′01″N 72°01′40″W |
| VT-2 | Mount Vernon Street Bridge | Replaced | Lenticular truss | 1885 | 1969 | Mount Vernon Street | Sleepers River | St. Johnsbury | Caledonia | 44°25′03″N 72°01′41″W |
| VT-3 | Elm Street Bridge | Extant | Bowstring arch truss | 1870 | 1976 | VT 12 (Elm Street) | Ottauquechee River | Woodstock | Windsor | 43°37′44″N 72°31′06″W |
| VT-13 | Northfield Parker Truss Bridge | Extant | Bowstring arch truss | 1870 | 1984 | Vine Street | Central Vermont Railroad | Northfield | Washington | 44°09′07″N 72°39′24″W |
| VT-15 | River Road Bridge | Replaced | Warren truss | 1928 | 1990 | Town Highway 22 (River Road) | Missisquoi River | Troy | Orleans | 44°54′58″N 72°23′46″W |
| VT-16 | Vermont Bridge No. 48 | Replaced | Parker truss | 1924 | 1989 | US 2 (South Main Street) | Winooski River | Waterbury | Washington | 44°19′42″N 72°44′47″W |
| VT-17 | Jeffersonville Bridge | Replaced | Parker truss | 1928 | 1990 | VT 108 | Lamoille River | Cambridge | Lamoille | 44°38′57″N 72°49′51″W |
| VT-18 | Cuttingsville Bridge | Replaced | Pratt truss | 1928 | 1989 | VT 103 | Mill River | Shrewsbury | Rutland | 43°29′17″N 72°52′53″W |
| VT-19 | Black River Bridge | Replaced | Warren truss | 1905 | 1990 | Town Highway 36 | Black River | Coventry | Orleans | 44°52′08″N 72°16′11″W |
| VT-21 | Laroque Bridge | Replaced | Warren truss | 1925 | 1991 | VT 116 | New Haven River | Bristol | Addison | 44°05′52″N 73°05′38″W |
| VT-22 | North Williston Bridge | Replaced | Pennsylvania truss | 1925 | 1991 | Town Highway 1 | Winooski River | Williston and Essex | Chittenden | 44°28′16″N 73°02′38″W |
| VT-28 | Brown Bridge | Extant | Town lattice truss | 1880 | 2004 | Upper Cold River Road | Cold River | Rutland | Rutland | 43°33′59″N 72°55′08″W |
| VT-29 | Flint Bridge | Extant | Queen post truss | 1874 | 2004 | Bicknell Hill Road | White River First Branch | Tunbridge | Orange | 43°56′58″N 72°27′31″W |
| VT-30 | Taftsville Bridge | Extant | King post truss | 1836 | 2004 | Covered Bridge Road | Ottauquechee River | Woodstock | Windsor | 43°37′51″N 72°28′04″W |
| VT-31 | Pulp Mill Bridge | Extant | Burr truss | 1854 | 2004 | Seymour Street | Otter Creek | Middlebury and Weybridge | Addison | 44°01′29″N 73°10′41″W |
| VT-32 | Shoreham Railroad Bridge | Extant | Howe truss | 1897 | 2004 | Addison County Railroad | Lemon Fair River | Shoreham | Addison | 43°51′34″N 73°15′21″W |
| VT-33 | Morgan Bridge | Extant | Queen post truss | 1886 | 2004 | Morgan Bridge Road | Lamoille River north branch | Belvidere | Lamoille | 44°44′36″N 72°43′41″W |
| VT-34 | Village Bridge | Extant | Burr truss | 1833 | 2004 | Bridge Street | Mad River | Fayston | Washington | 44°11′22″N 72°49′25″W |
| VT-36 | Swallow's Bridge | Extant | Timber arch | 1890 | 2004 | Churchill Road | Mill Creek | Windsor | Windsor | 43°27′19″N 72°30′59″W |
| VT-37 | Pine Brook Bridge | Extant | King post truss | 1872 | 2004 | Town Highway 3 | Pine Brook | Fayston | Washington | 44°12′21″N 72°47′31″W |
| VT-40 | Hall Bridge | Extant | Town lattice truss | 1982 | 2004 | Hall Bridge Road | Saxtons River | Rockingham | Windham | 43°08′14″N 72°29′14″W |
