= Pine Brook Covered Bridge =

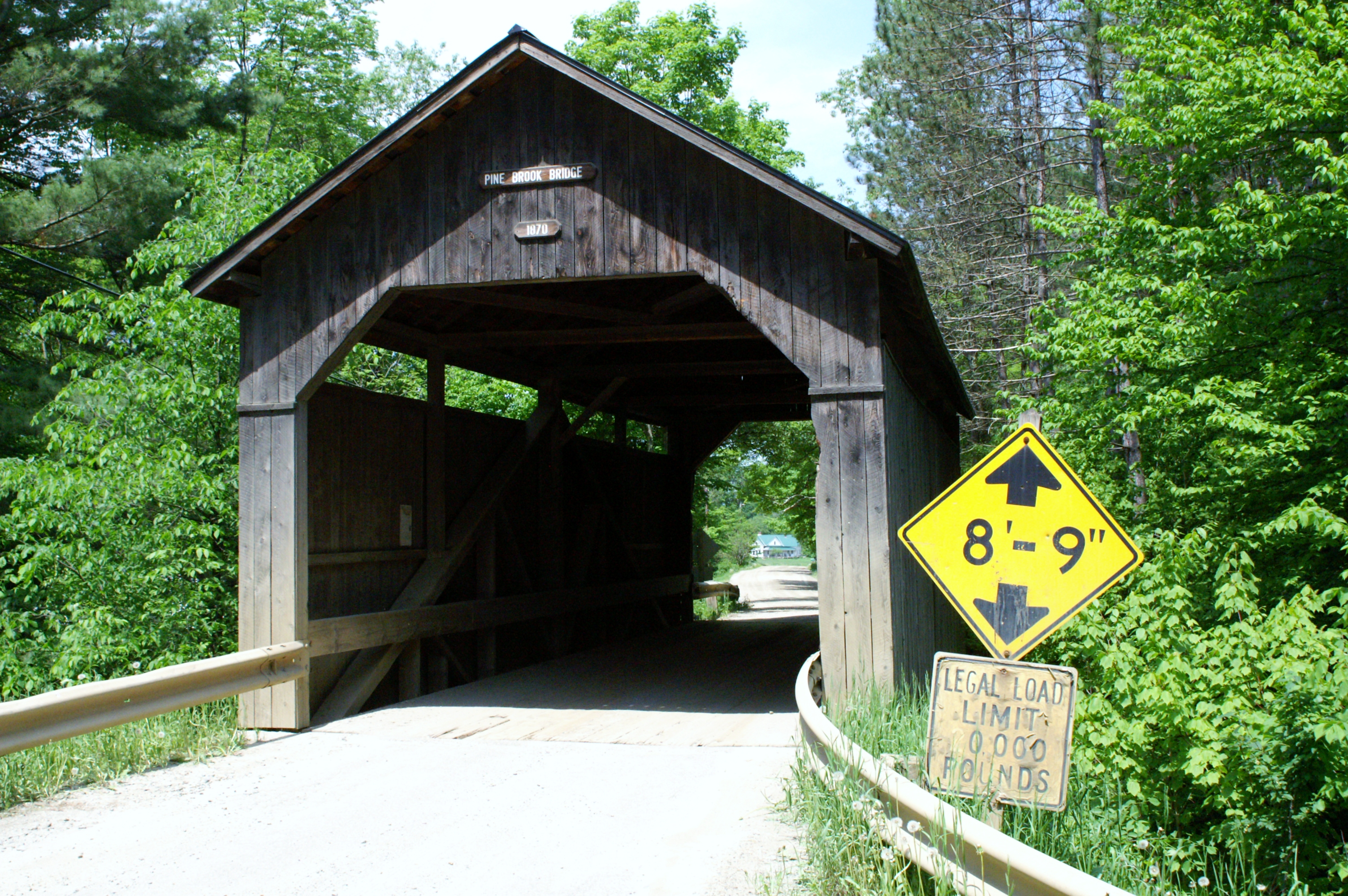
- Bridge in U.S. state of Vermont
- Coordinates: 44°12′22″N 72°47′31″W
- Carries: North Road
- Crosses: Pine Brook
- Locale: Waitsfield, Vermont
- Maintained by: Town of Waitsfield
- ID number: VT-12-12

Characteristics
- Design: Covered, King post
- Material: Wood
- Total length: 48.5 ft (14.78 m)
- Width: 14.1 ft (4.30 m)
- No. of spans: 1
- Load limit: 5 tons
- Clearance above: 8.75 ft (2.67 m)

History
- Constructed by: unknown
- Construction end: 1872
- Pine Brook Covered Bridge
- U.S. National Register of Historic Places
- U.S. Historic district – Contributing property
- Location within Vermont Location within the United States
- Coordinates: 44°12′21″N 72°47′31″W
- Area: 1 acre (0.4 ha)
- Part of: Mad River Valley Rural Historic District (ID94000836)
- NRHP reference No.: 74000264

Significant dates
- Added to NRHP: June 13, 1974
- Designated CP: August 5, 1994

The Pine Brook Covered Bridge, also called the Wilder Covered Bridge, is a wooden covered bridge that crosses Pine Brook in Waitsfield, Vermont on North Road. Built in 1872, it is one two surviving 19th-century covered bridges in the town. It was listed on the National Register of Historic Places in 1974.

== Description and history ==
The Pine Brook Bridge stands in a rural area of northern Waitsfield, carrying North Road, a principal road in the area, across Pine Brook, a tributary of the Mad River to the west. It consists of two king post trusses, and is 48 feet (15 m) long and 17.5 feet (5.3 m) wide, with a roadway width of 14.5 feet (4.4 m) (one lane). It rests on stone abutments faced in concrete, and its wooden bridge deck is supported by steel I-beams. Its exterior is clad in vertical board siding, which extends a short way inside the portals. The roof is standing seam metal.

The bridge was built in 1872. It is one of only two historic covered bridges (the other being the Stony Brook Covered Bridge) left in the state with the king post design, and one of only two in the town (the other being the Great Eddy Covered Bridge). In 1976 repairs were made to the then dilapidating structure. Concrete caps were added to the abutments and steel I-beams were added just below the deck, so that only an overload condition would require the additional support of the beams. The trusses also received attention. In 1989 the deck was replaced.

== See also ==
- List of covered bridges in Vermont
- List of bridges documented by the Historic American Engineering Record in Vermont
- List of bridges on the National Register of Historic Places in Vermont
- National Register of Historic Places listings in Washington County, Vermont
