= East Shoreham Covered Railroad Bridge =

- U.S. National Register of Historic Places
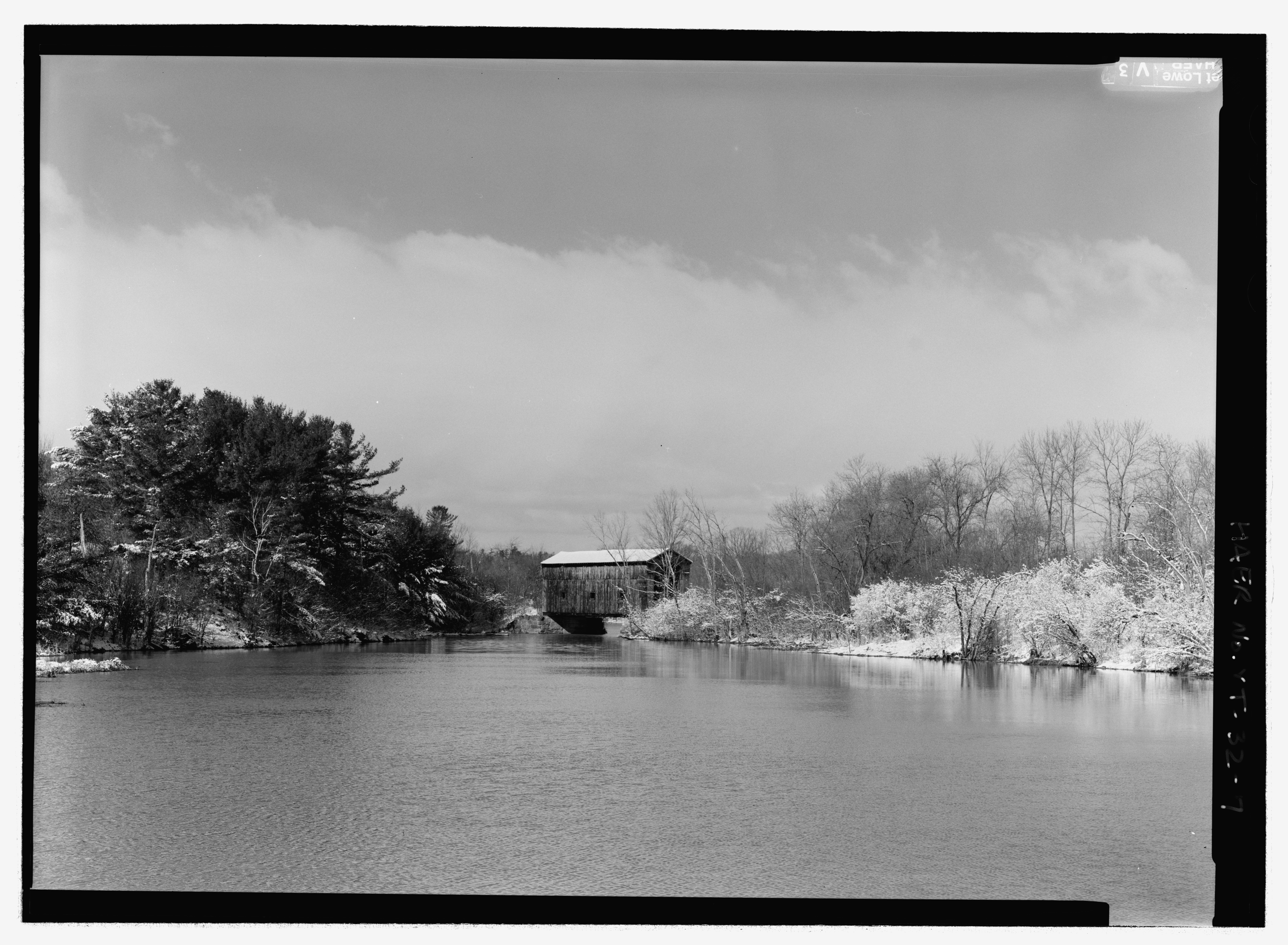
- 2003 HABS/HAER photo

- Location within Vermont Location within the United States
- Location: SE of Shoreham over Lemon Fair River, Shoreham, Vermont
- Coordinates: 43°51′33″N 73°15′22″W
- Area: 1 acre (0.40 ha)
- Built: 1897
- Built by: Rutland Railroad Company
- NRHP reference No.: 74000198
- Added to NRHP: June 13, 1974

The East Shoreham Covered Railroad Bridge is a historic covered bridge spanning the Lemon Fair River near East Shoreham, Vermont. Built in 1897 by the Rutland Railroad Company, it is the state's only surviving example of a wooden Howe truss railroad bridge. It was listed on the National Register of Historic Places in 1974.

== Description and history ==
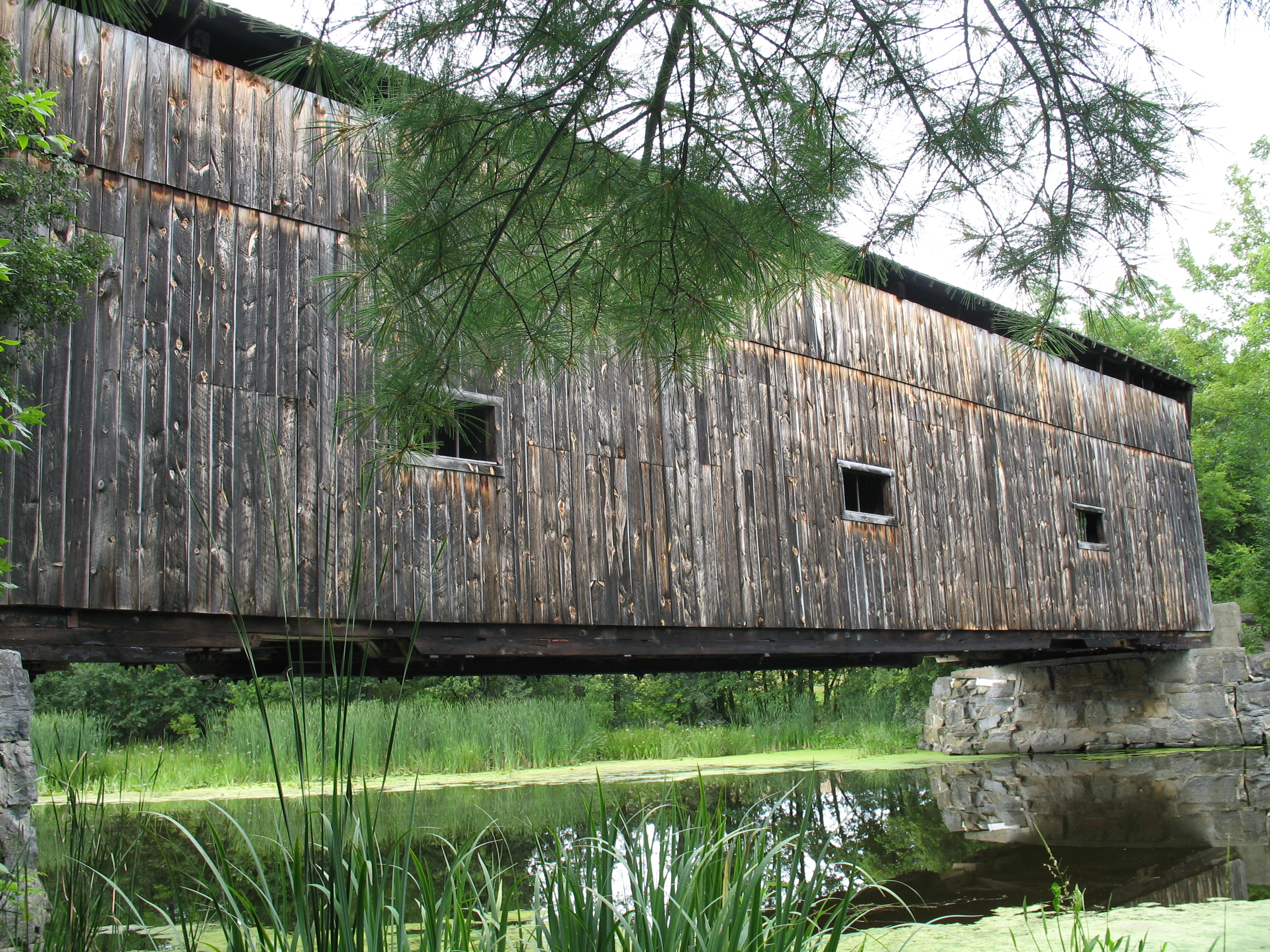
Shoreline view taken in 2006

The East Shoreham Bridge is located in a rural area of southeastern Shoreham, on the Lemon Fair River. It is located about 0.2 miles (0.32 km) west of the Shoreham-Depot Road, and is accessible on foot via the former railroad right-of-way, now (along with the bridge) a state-owned property. It is a single-span Howe truss structure, 109 feet (33 m) in length, and set on dry-laid stone abutments faced in concrete. The trusses consist of wooden diagonals and iron rod verticals. The bridge has a total width of 20 feet (6.1 m) and an internal width of 13.5 feet (4.1 m). The railroad tracks, which have been removed, were original laid directly on the deck timbers. The bridge's exterior consists of vertical board siding covered by a metal roof.

The bridge was built in 1897 by the Rutland Railroad Company for service on its Addison Branch line. Because of the line's relatively light traffic, it was not judged necessary to go to the expense of building an iron bridge, resulting in the construction of one of the state's few surviving 19th-century covered railroad bridges. It remained in service until 1951, when the line was abandoned. The state acquired the bridge and surrounding land in 1972.

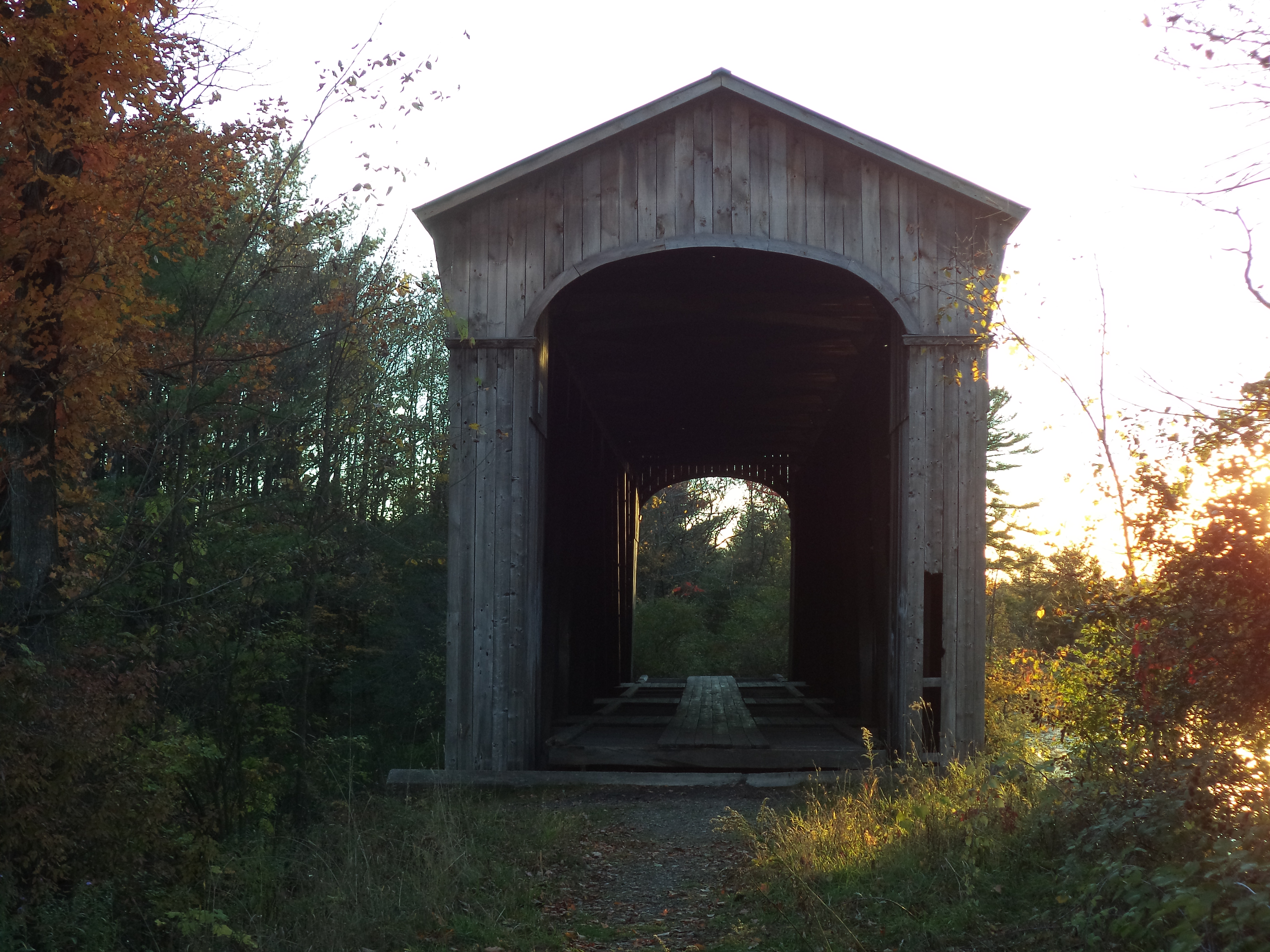
Interior of the bridge at twilight

== See also ==
- List of Vermont covered bridges
- List of bridges documented by the Historic American Engineering Record in Vermont
- List of bridges on the National Register of Historic Places in Vermont
- National Register of Historic Places listings in Addison County, Vermont
