= Mill Covered Bridge =

Mill Covered Bridge may refer to:

- Mill Covered Bridge (Belvidere, Vermont), listed on the National Register of Historic Places in Lamoille County, Vermont
- Mill Covered Bridge (Tunbridge, Vermont), listed on the National Register of Historic Places in Orange County, Vermont
