= Morgan Covered Bridge =

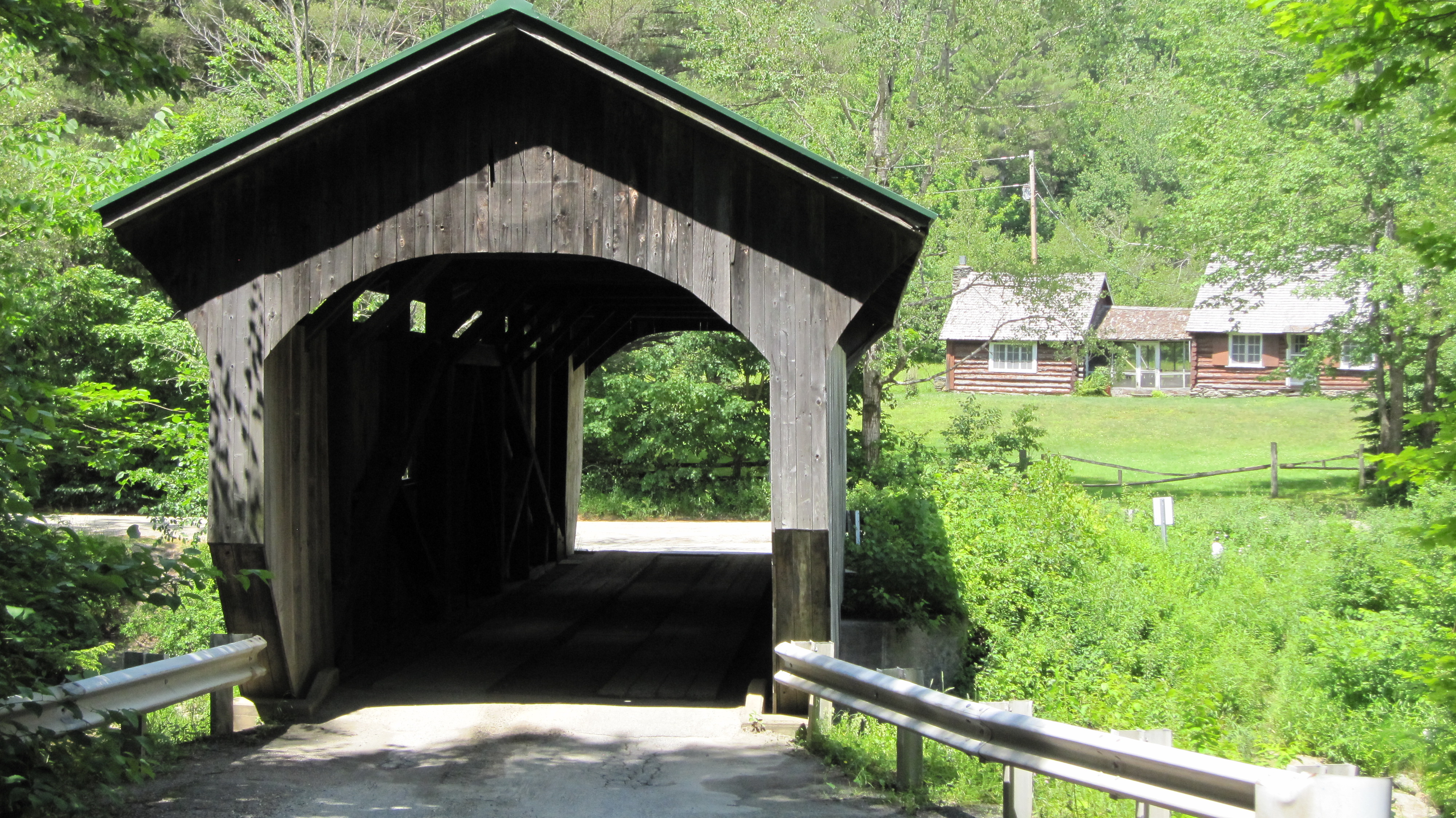
- Bridge in U.S. state of Vermont
- Coordinates: 44°44′35″N 72°43′41″W
- Carries: Automobile
- Crosses: North Branch of Lamoille River
- Locale: Belvidere, Vermont
- Maintained by: Town of Belvidere
- ID number: VT-08-07

Characteristics
- Design: Covered, Queenpost
- Material: Wood
- Total length: 70 ft 11 in (21.62 m)
- Width: 12 ft 2.75 in (3.73 m)
- No. of spans: 1
- Load limit: 5 tons
- Clearance above: 8 ft 6 in (2.59 m)

History
- Constructed by: Lewis Robinson, et al.
- Construction end: 1887
- Morgan Covered Bridge
- U.S. National Register of Historic Places
- Location within Vermont Location within the United States
- Coordinates: 44°44′36″N 72°43′40″W
- Area: 1 acre (0.40 ha)
- NRHP reference No.: 74000229
- Added to NRHP: November 19, 1974

The Morgan Covered Bridge, also known as the Upper Covered Bridge is a wooden covered bridge that crosses the North Branch Lamoille River in Belvidere, Vermont on Morgan Bridge Road. Built about 1887, it is one of the two covered bridges in Belvidere, and one of five in a five-mile span that all cross the same river. It was listed on the National Register of Historic Places in 1974.

== Description ==
The Morgan Covered Bridge is located west of the center of Belvidere, carrying Morgan Bridge Road, a short connector between Back Road (running on the north side of the North Branch Lamoille River) and Vermont Route 109 (running to its south). It is a single-span Queen post truss structure, 62 feet (19 m) long and 15 feet (4.6 m) wide, with a roadway width of 12.5 feet (3.8 m). Its trusses include iron rods joining the apexes of the diagonals to the bottom chords. It has a gabled metal roof, and its exterior is finished in vertical board siding, which wraps around to the insides of the portals. The siding stops short of the eaves, leaving an open strip below the roof. The portal openings are framed as segmented arches. The bridge rests on abutments of stone and concrete.

== History ==
The bridge was built by Lewis Robinson, Charles Leonard and Fred Tracy. It is one of two 19th-century covered bridges (the other is the Mill Covered Bridge further west), and one of five on the North Branch Lamoille in Belvidere or neighboring Waterville, all within a five-mile span.

There have been no major repairs necessary with this bridge recently, save for a new standing seam metal roof which a large number of covered bridges in Vermont received due to a grant. A study in the 1990s by the Vermont Agency of Transportation revealed that certain design details of the trusses allowed the bridge to be rated for a 9-ton load (1 ton more than the standard load limit for wooden deck bridges). At this time, a sign at the bridge posts the limit at 5 tons.

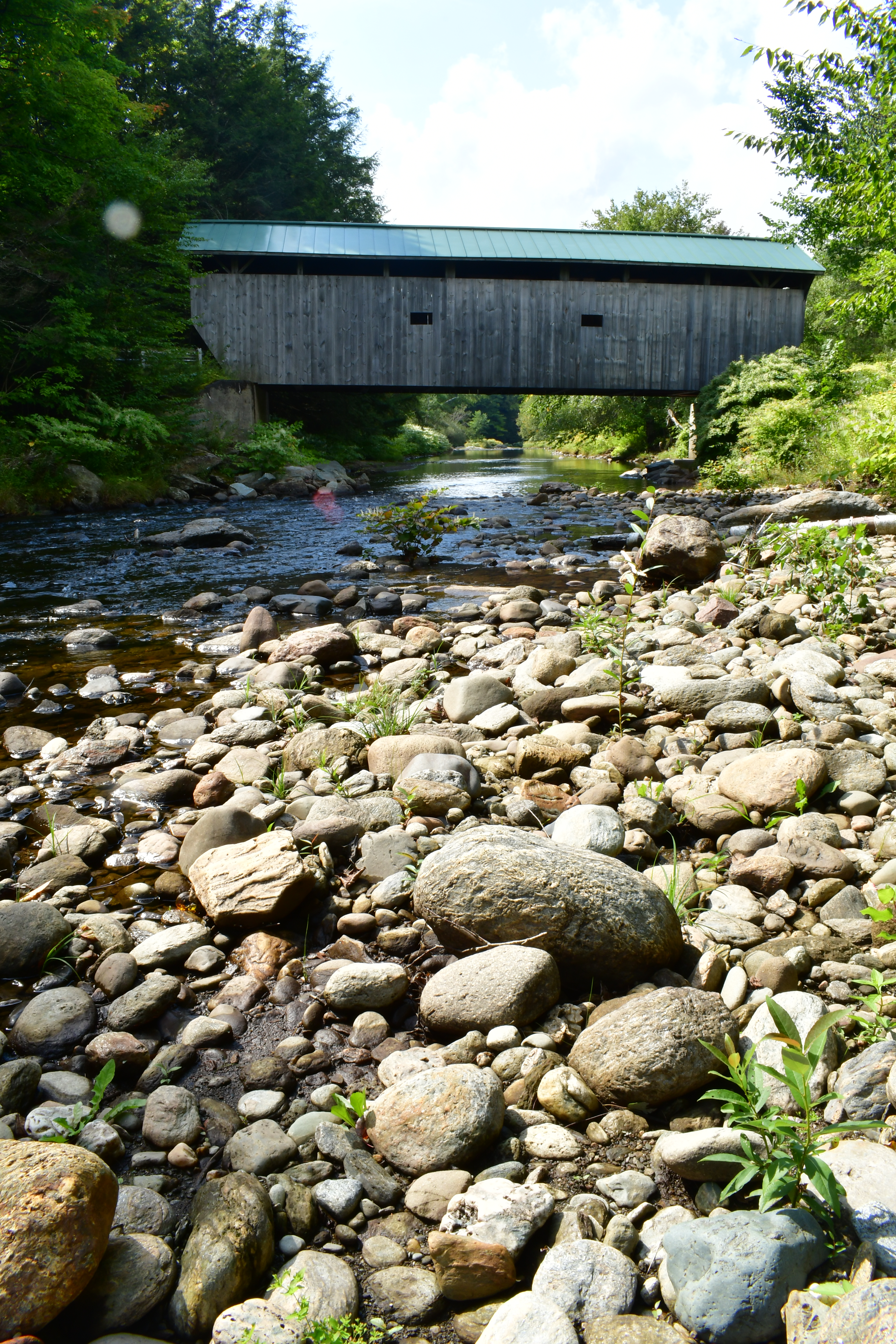

== See also ==
- List of Vermont covered bridges
- List of bridges documented by the Historic American Engineering Record in Vermont
- List of bridges on the National Register of Historic Places in Vermont
- National Register of Historic Places listings in Lamoille County, Vermont
