= Stony Brook Covered Bridge =

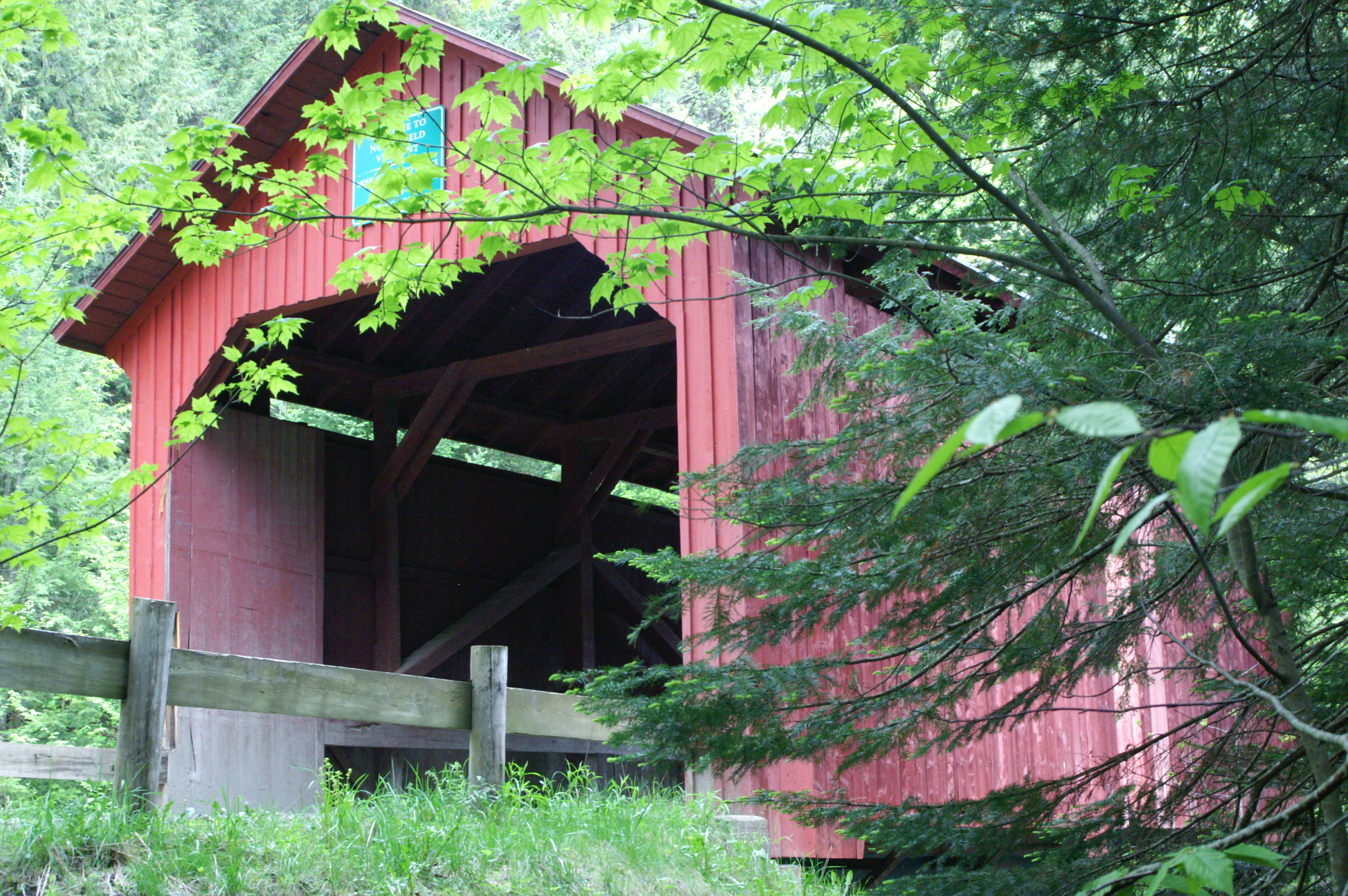
- Bridge in U.S. state of Vermont
- Coordinates: 44°07′12″N 72°41′20″W
- Carries: Automobile
- Crosses: Stony Brook
- Locale: Northfield, Vermont
- Maintained by: Town of Northfield
- ID number: VT-12-07

Characteristics
- Design: Covered, King post
- Material: Wood
- Total length: 36.75 ft (11.20 m)
- Width: 15.8 ft (4.82 m)
- No. of spans: 1

History
- Constructed by: John Moseley
- Construction end: 1899
- Stony Brook Covered Bridge
- U.S. National Register of Historic Places
- Location within Vermont Location within the United States
- Coordinates: 44°07′13″N 72°41′21″W
- Area: 1 acre (0.4 ha)
- NRHP reference No.: 74000266
- Added to NRHP: November 20, 1974

The Stony Brook Covered Bridge, also called the Moseley Covered Bridge, is a wooden covered bridge that crosses Stony Brook in Northfield, Vermont on Stony Brook Road. Built in 1899, it is one of two surviving 19th-century King post truss bridges in the state. It was listed on the National Register of Historic Places in 1974.

== Description and history ==
The Stony Brook Covered Bridge stands in a rural area of southern Northfield, carrying Stony Brook Road across the eponymous brook in a roughly northwest-southeast orientation. It is a single-span King post truss structure, 36.5 feet (11.1 m) long, with a total width of 19 feet (5.8 m) and a roadway width of 16 feet (4.9 m) (one lane). It is covered by a gabled roof, and its exterior is clad in vertical board siding, which extends a short way inside each portal. The siding does not extend all the way to the roof, providing an open strip between the two. The bridge rests on stone abutments that have been faced in concrete, and has a deck of wooden planks.

The bridge was built in 1899, and is believed to be the last King post truss bridge to be built in the historic period of covered bridge construction in the state. It is one of only two historic bridges of this design left standing in the state, the other being the Pine Brook Covered Bridge. It is also one of five covered bridges in Northfield, representing one of the highest concentrations of covered bridges in the state. In 1971 the bridge deck was strengthened by the addition of 5 steel I beams underneath. In 1990 the original granite abutments were faced with concrete.

== See also ==
- List of covered bridges in Vermont
- National Register of Historic Places listings in Washington County, Vermont
- List of bridges on the National Register of Historic Places in Vermont
