= Great Eddy Covered Bridge =

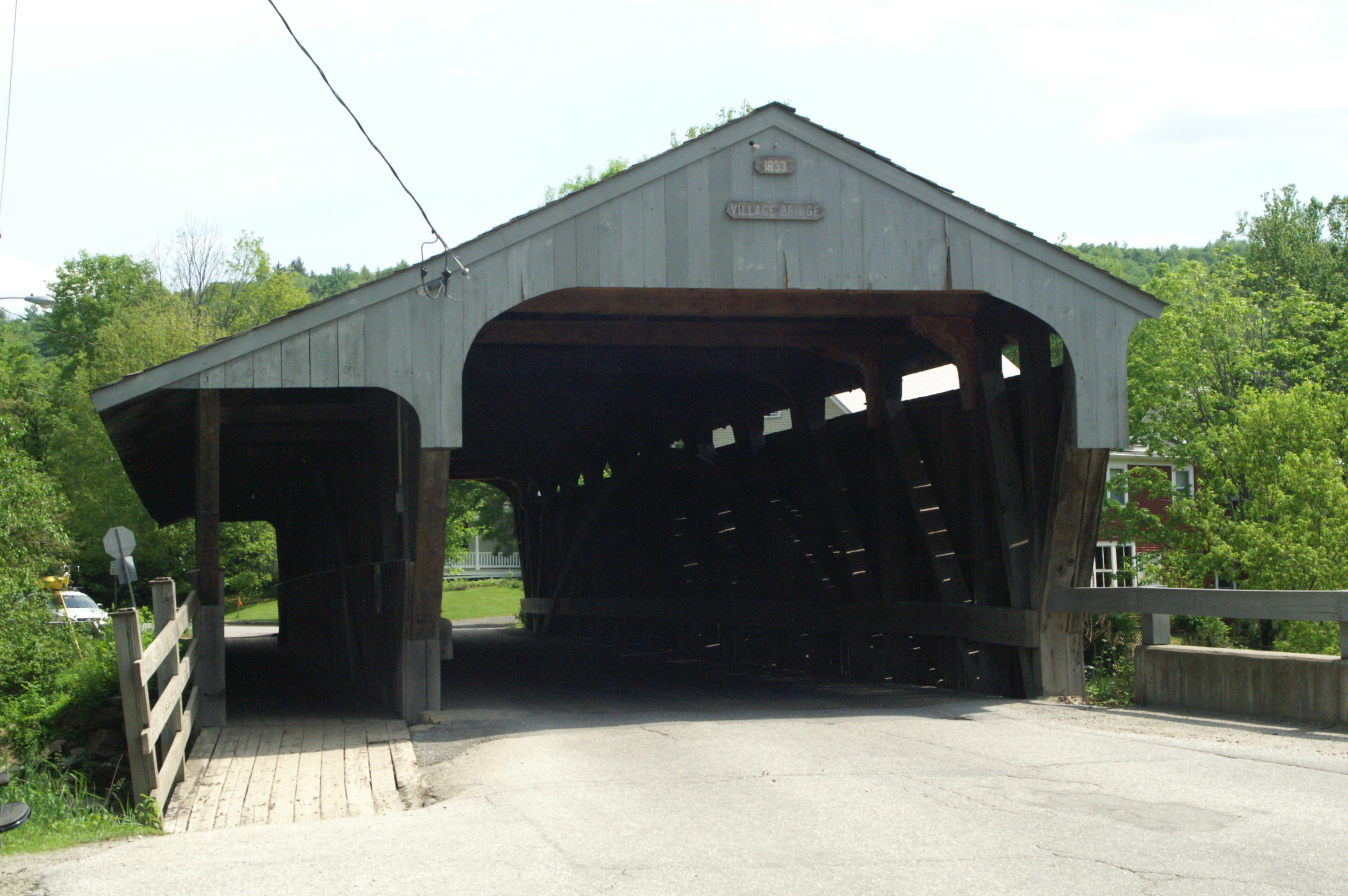
- Coordinates: 44°11′20″N 72°49′23″W
- Carries: Automobile
- Crosses: Mad River
- Locale: Waitsfield, Vermont
- Maintained by: Town of Waitsfield
- ID number: VT-12-14

Characteristics
- Design: Covered, Burr arch
- Material: Wood
- Total length: 107.25 ft (32.7 m)
- Width: 16.1 ft (4.9 m)
- No. of spans: 1
- Load limit: 3 tons
- Clearance above: 9.5 ft (2.9 m)

History
- Constructed by: unknown
- Construction end: 1833
- Great Eddy Covered Bridge
- U.S. National Register of Historic Places
- Location within Vermont Location within the United States
- Coordinates: 44°11′22″N 72°49′25″W
- Area: 1 acre (0.4 ha)
- NRHP reference No.: 74000261
- Added to NRHP: September 6, 1974

The Great Eddy Covered Bridge, also called the Big Eddy Covered Bridge or Waitsfield Covered Bridge, is a wooden covered bridge that crosses the Mad River in Waitsfield, Vermont on Bridge Street. Built in 1833, it is one of Vermont's oldest covered bridges. It was listed on the National Register of Historic Places in 1974.

== Description ==
The Great Eddy Covered Bridge stands just east of Waitsfield's center, spanning the Mad River in a roughly north-south orientation. It is a single-span Burr truss structure, 105 feet (32 m) in length. Each truss incorporates a laminated arch, and laminated stringers have been added underneath the deck for added strength. The bridge is covered by a metal roof, which extends on the east side over a walkway on the outside of the eastern truss. The bridge was built in 1833, and is at least the second-oldest covered bridge (after only the Pulp Mill Covered Bridge, which may have been built at a later date). It is also the state's longest single-span Burr truss bridge.

== Recent history ==
The bridge has had many repairs in recent history, probably owing to the frequent traffic on it. In 1973, 1989, 1992, and 2001 different repairs were made.

Heavy rainfall from Hurricane Irene on August 28, 2011, swelled the Mad River and caused significant flooding throughout Waitsfield and the surrounding area. By late afternoon on August 28, the flood water had eliminated any clearance the bridge had over the river. In spite of water pummeling the side of the bridge and lifting several nearby buildings off their foundations, however, the bridge survived. At last report, this bridge had been closed due to damage to the abutments.

On July 8, 2016, a board member of the name Sal Spinosa confronted children jumping off the bridge into the Mad River and cut a rope swing and cursed/yelled at the children. Being a select board member, he was able to put in place a "no diving, jumping off the bridge, injury or death are possible!" sign. The bridge is of burr arch truss design. A sign on the bridge also identifies it as the Village covered bridge, and most news accounts about it refer to it by that name. The name is appropriate as it is located right in the village of Waitsfield (whereas a vast majority of surviving covered bridges tend to be off the beaten path). The walkway is not original to the bridge, being added in 1940.

The bridge was closed for repairs in spring 2015 and reopened on November 12, 2016.

Since then, although a sign was put up in 2016, people of all ages continue to jump off of the green metal roof of the bridge, out slits in the side, out of the windows of the walkway, and off of the concrete structure. Within various groups of people it is a common challenge to do a stunt off the roof, such as riding a scooter or doing a flip. A section of the river directly below is approximately twelve feet deep.

== See also ==
- List of Vermont covered bridges
- List of bridges documented by the Historic American Engineering Record in Vermont
- List of bridges on the National Register of Historic Places in Vermont
- National Register of Historic Places listings in Washington County, Vermont
