= Mill Covered Bridge (Belvidere, Vermont) =

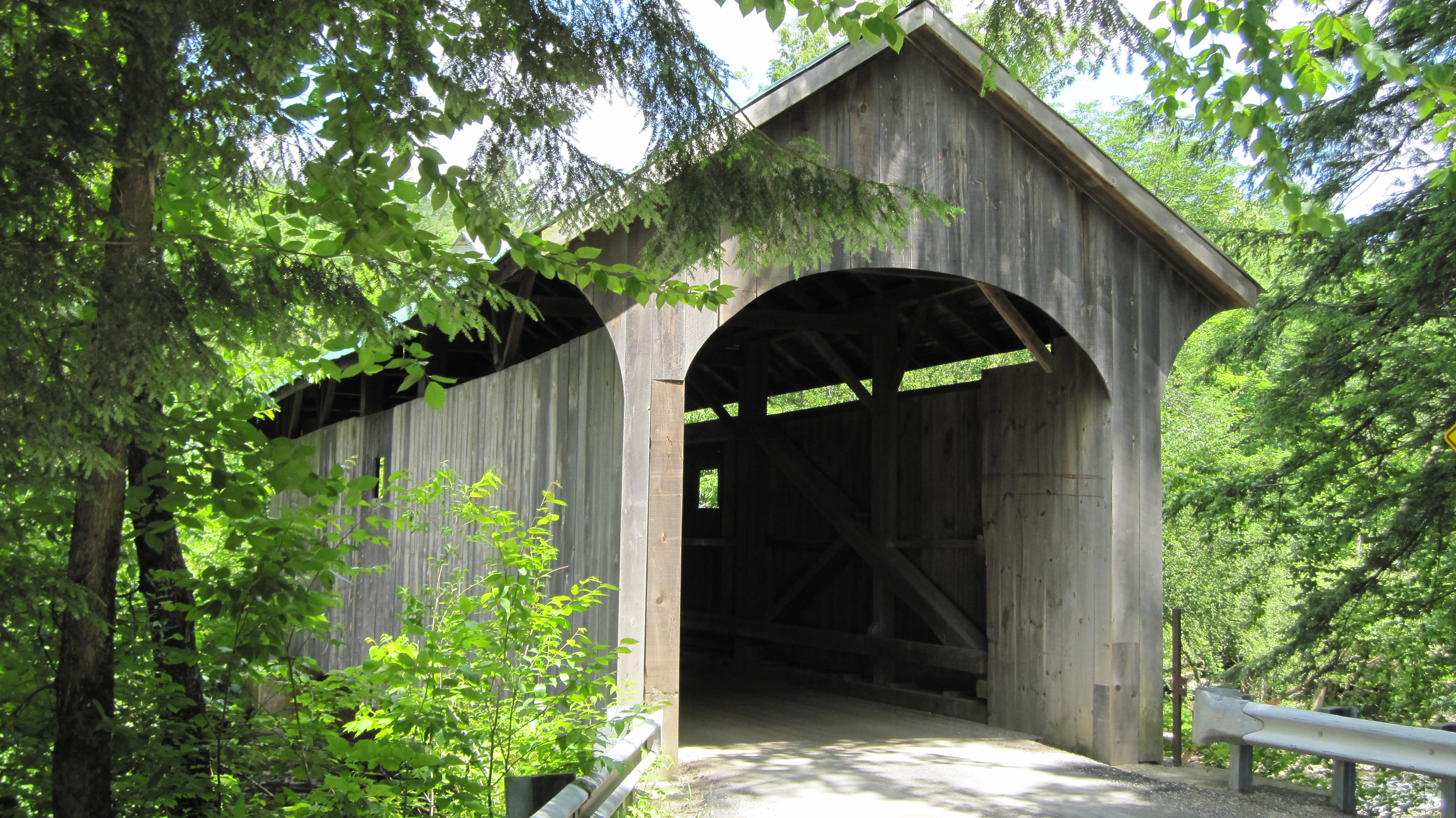
- Bridge in U.S. state of Vermont
- Coordinates: 44°44′38″N 72°44′27″W
- Carries: Automobile
- Crosses: North Branch of Lamoille River
- Locale: Belvidere, Vermont
- Maintained by: Town of Belvidere
- ID number: VT-08-06

Characteristics
- Design: Covered, Town lattice
- Material: Wood
- Total length: 70 ft 4.75 in (21.46 m)
- Width: 11 ft 11.5 in (3.64 m)
- No. of spans: 1
- Load limit: 8 tons

History
- Constructed by: Lewis Robinson
- Construction end: 1895
- Mill Covered Bridge
- U.S. National Register of Historic Places
- Location within Vermont Location within the United States
- Coordinates: 44°44′38″N 72°44′27″W
- Area: 1 acre (0.40 ha)
- NRHP reference No.: 74000227
- Added to NRHP: November 19, 1974

The Mill Covered Bridge is a wooden covered bridge that crosses the North Branch Lamoille River on Back Road in Belvidere, Vermont. Built about 1890, it is one of two surviving covered bridges in the rural community. It was listed on the National Register of Historic Places in 1974.

== Description and history ==
The Mill Covered Bridge stands in a rural area west of the village center of Belvidere, carrying Back Road (which runs west from the town north of the river) to its junction with Vermont Route 109 (which runs west from the town south of the river). The bridge is a single-span Queen post truss structure, 70 feet (21 m) long and 15 feet (4.6 m) wide, with a roadway width of 12 feet (3.7 m) (one lane). Its trusses are set on abutments of dry laid stone that have been capped in concrete. They are set slightly skewed, giving the bridge a parallelogram shape. The exterior of the bridge is finished in vertical board siding, which extends around to the insides of the portals. The siding ends short of the roof on the sides, leaving an open strip. The north portal opening is framed as a segmented-arch opening, while that on the south end is rectangular with diagonal corners. The bridge deck is wooden planking laid in steel I-beams, which now carry the bridge's active load.

The bridge was built by Lewis Robinson in about 1890. It is one of two bridges in Belvidere (the other, the Morgan Covered Bridge, is east of this one), and one of five bridges across the North Branch Lamoille in a span of five miles. The steel beams were installed under the deck of the bridge in 1971 after a contractor's snowplow broke through. The trusses were repaired in 1995 by Jan Lewandoski and Paul Ide.

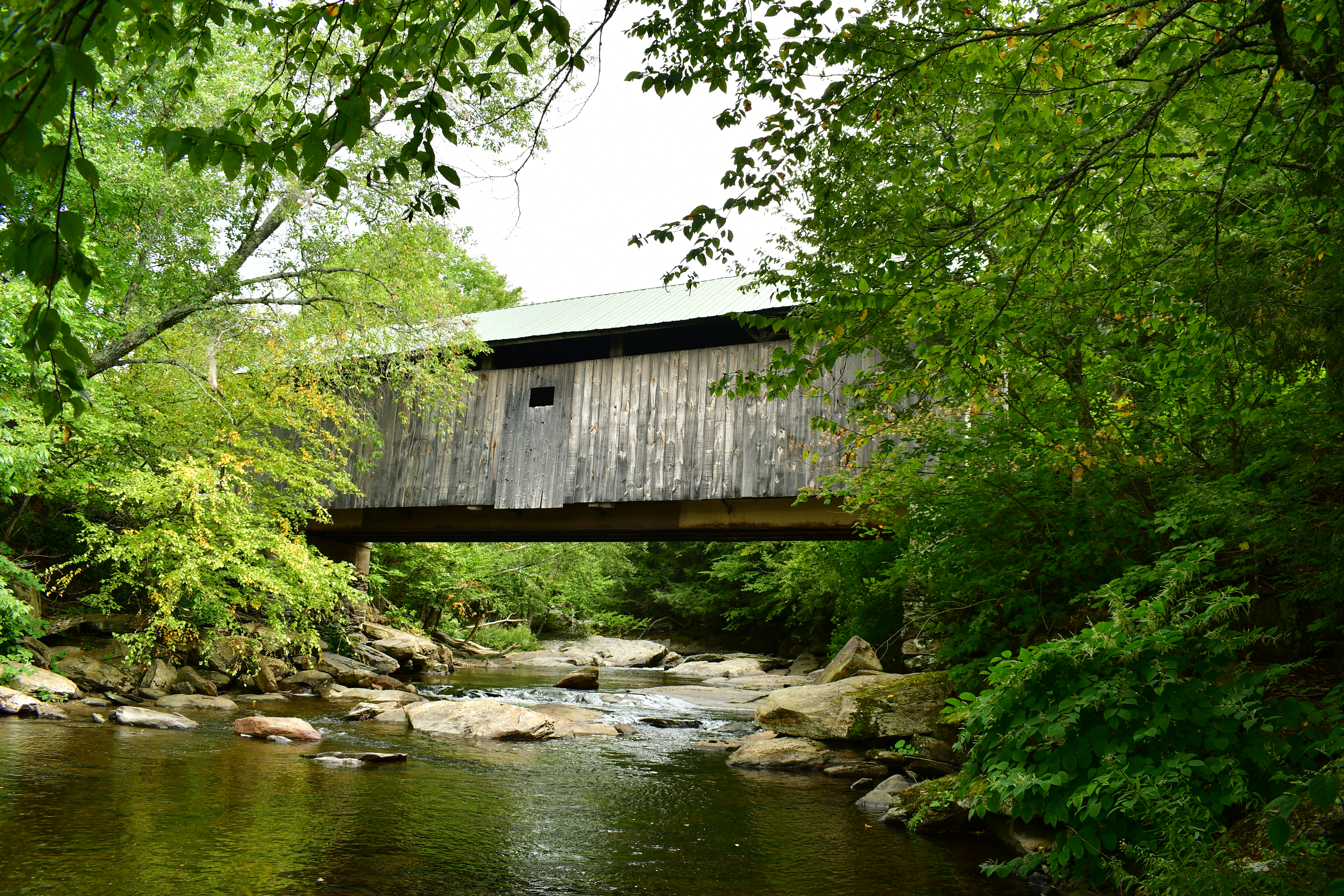

== See also ==
- National Register of Historic Places listings in Lamoille County, Vermont
- List of Vermont covered bridges
- List of bridges on the National Register of Historic Places in Vermont
