= Pulp Mill Covered Bridge =

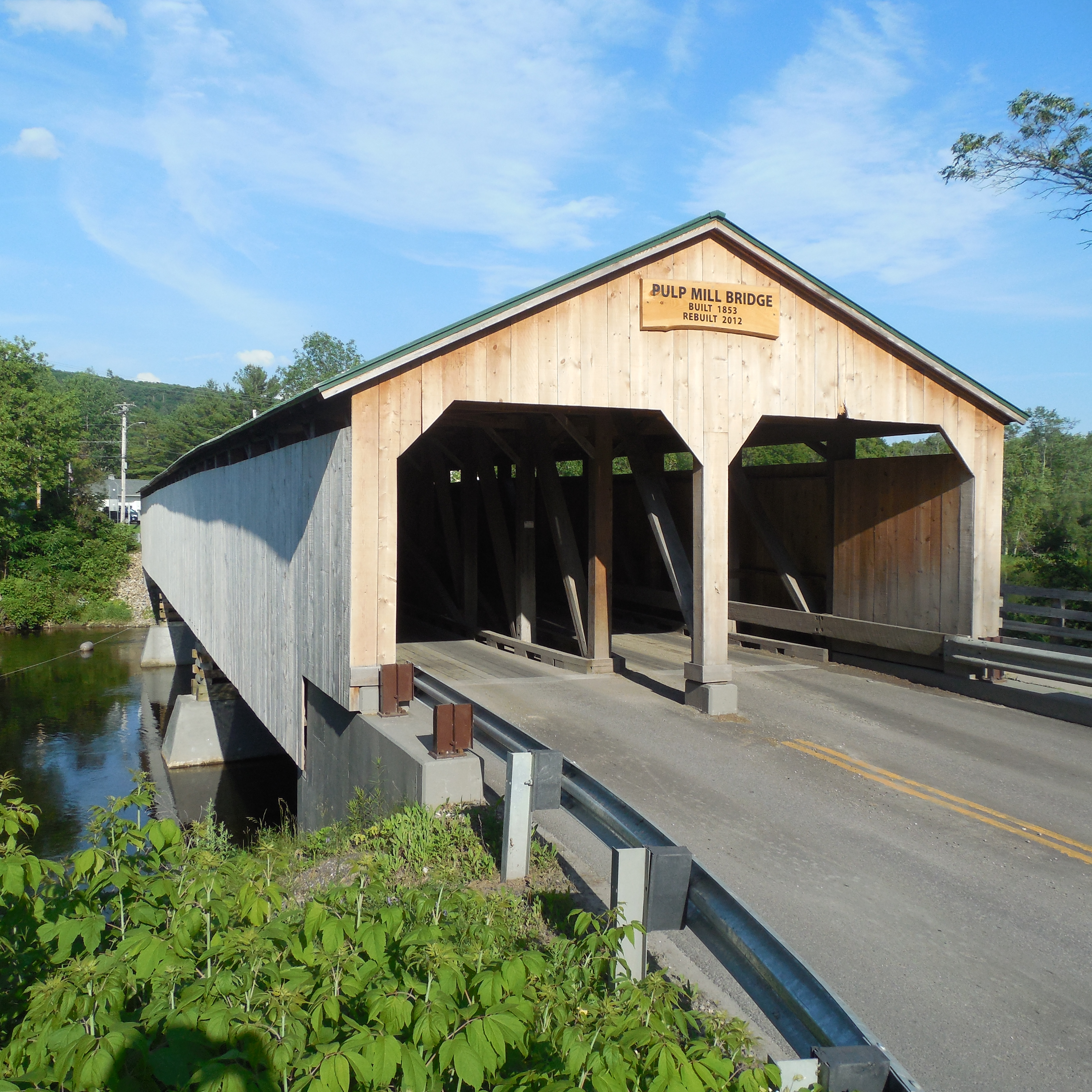
- Bridge in U.S. state of Vermont
- Coordinates: 44°01′30″N 73°10′41″W
- Carries: Automobile
- Crosses: Otter Creek
- Locale: Middlebury, Vermont
- Maintained by: Towns of Middlebury and Weybridge
- ID number: VT-01-04

Characteristics
- Design: Covered, Burr arch
- Material: Wood
- Total length: 199 ft (60.66 m)
- Width: 22.5 ft (6.86 m)
- No. of spans: 3
- Clearance above: 8 ft (2.4 m)

History
- Constructed by: unknown
- Construction end: ca 1820
- Pulp Mill Covered Bridge
- U.S. National Register of Historic Places
- Location within Vermont Location within the United States
- Coordinates: 44°1′29″N 73°10′41″W
- Area: 1 acre (0.4 ha)
- NRHP reference No.: 74000200
- Added to NRHP: September 10, 1974

The Pulp Mill Covered Bridge, also called the Paper Mill Covered Bridge, is a wooden covered bridge that crosses Otter Creek between Middlebury and Weybridge, Vermont on Seymour Street. It was listed on the National Register of Historic Places in 1974.

== History ==
The bridge is of Burr arch design. Around 1860, the original Burr arches were removed, and laminated ones added to King post trusses, changing the bridge type to a King post with Burr arch design. This bridge has many distinctions. It is one of only seven double-barreled (two lane) covered bridges in the country, one of only two in the State of Vermont (the Museum Covered Bridge being the other), and the only still carrying regular traffic. It is also the oldest covered bridge in Vermont, and one of the oldest in the country.

The exact age of the bridge is in question. A sign on the bridge states it was built between 1808 and 1820. Covered Bridge expert Jan Lewandosky has placed the year of construction at approximately 1850 based on his search of Minutes of the Selectboard of the Town of Middlebury, and his voluminous knowledge of covered bridge construction. In 1850 the Town of Middlebury sent a person to Essex, Vermont, to examine a recently completed Burr Arch bridge, unfortunately the design was not copied correctly leading to the design flaws.

== Improvements ==
The bridge was originally built as a single span but inherent design problems, and heavy use, has driven almost constant improvements. Amongst those improvements was the addition of two piers in the creek effectively dividing the bridge into 3 spans. A non-structural improvement was the addition of a walkway on the outside of the bridge by the Towns of Weybridge and Middlebury. Several other rounds of repairs have been made and chronicled extensively at the Vermont Bridges website.

The Pulp Mill bridge was closed from January 2, 2012 until November 9, 2012 for rehabilitation.

== Photo gallery ==
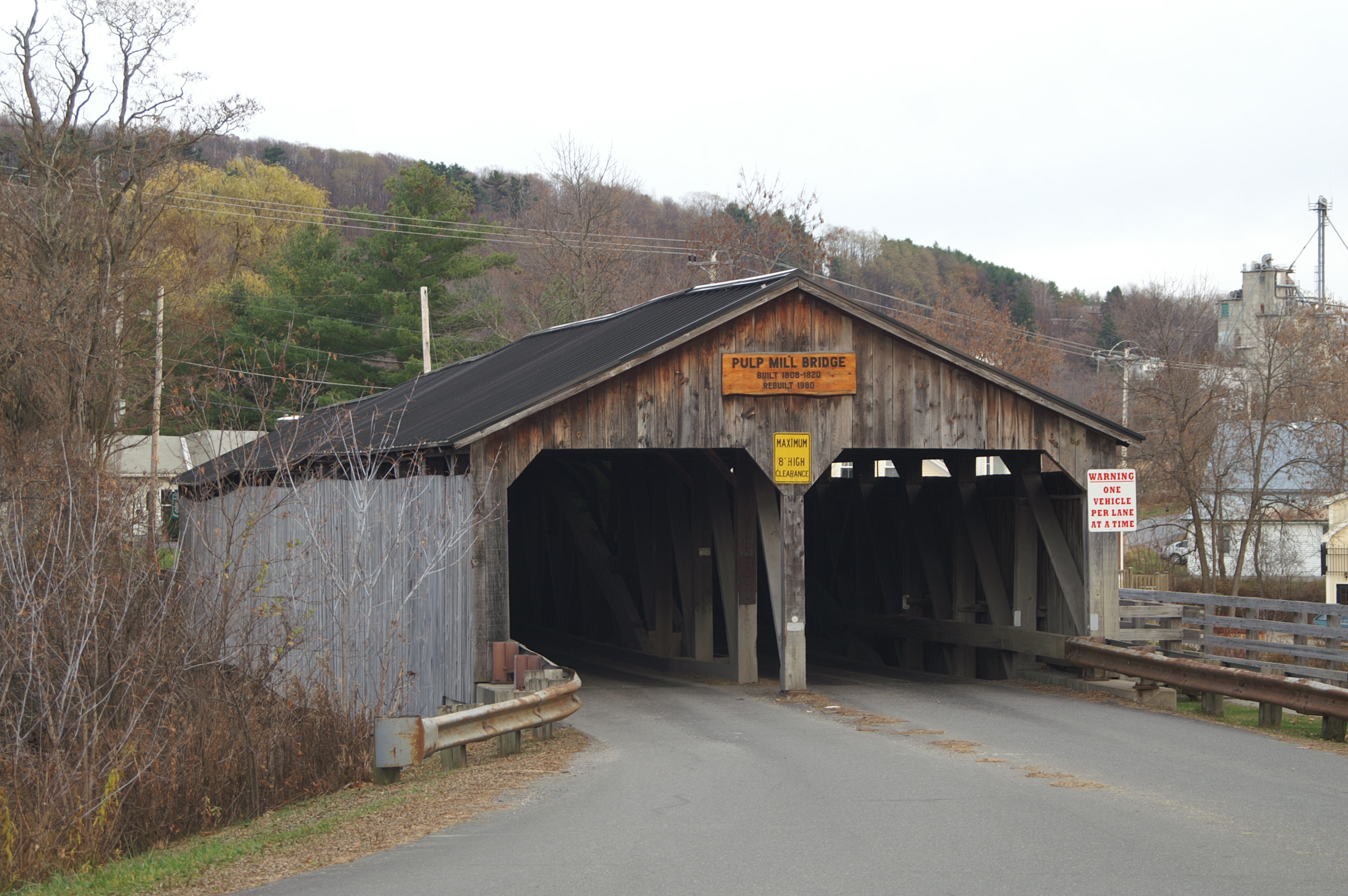
View of Pulp Mill Bridge looking east from Weybridge in 2009; before the 2012 rehabilitation project

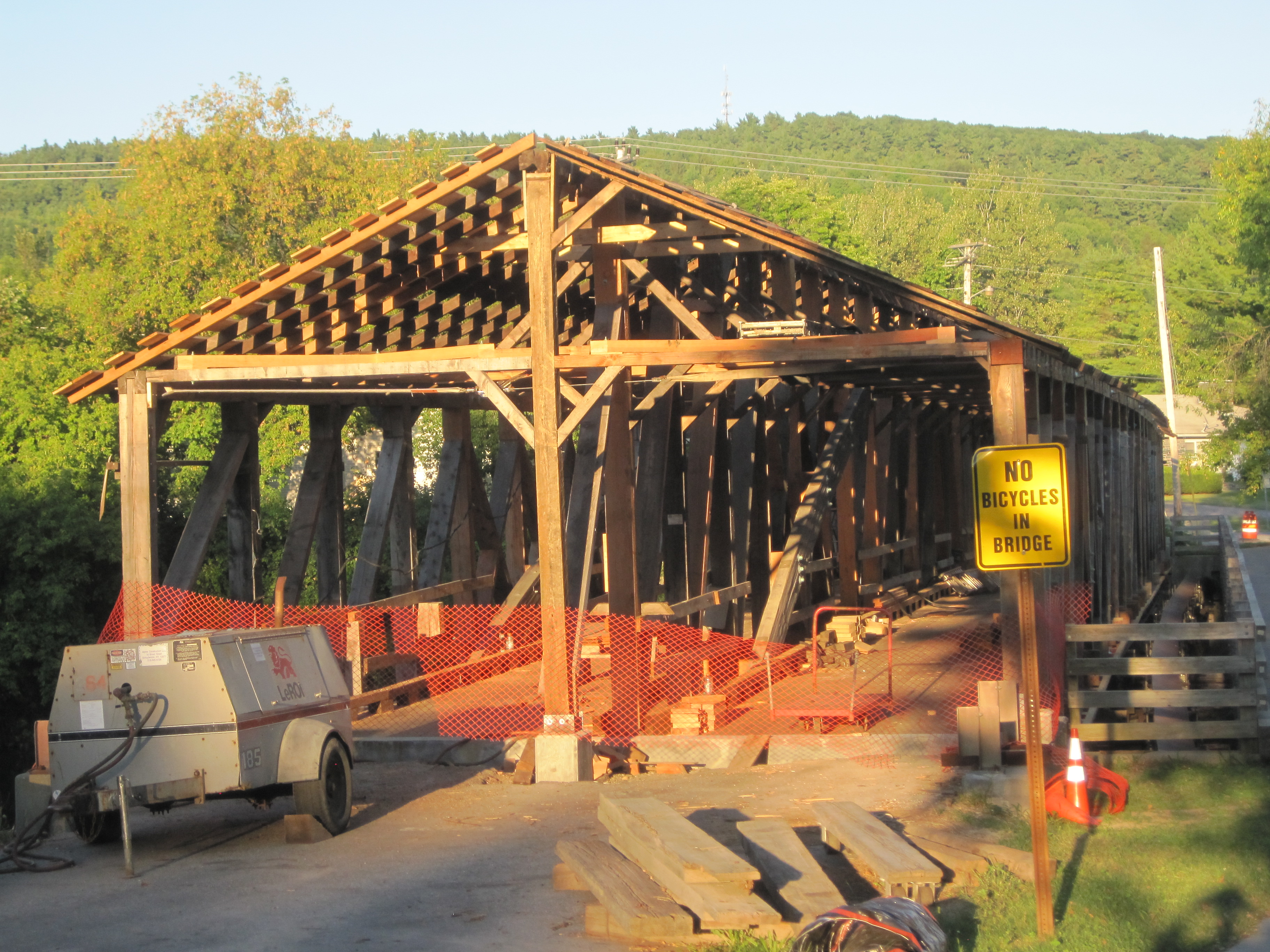
Pulp Mill Bridge (looking east from Weybridge) during the rehabilitation project: Sep 2012

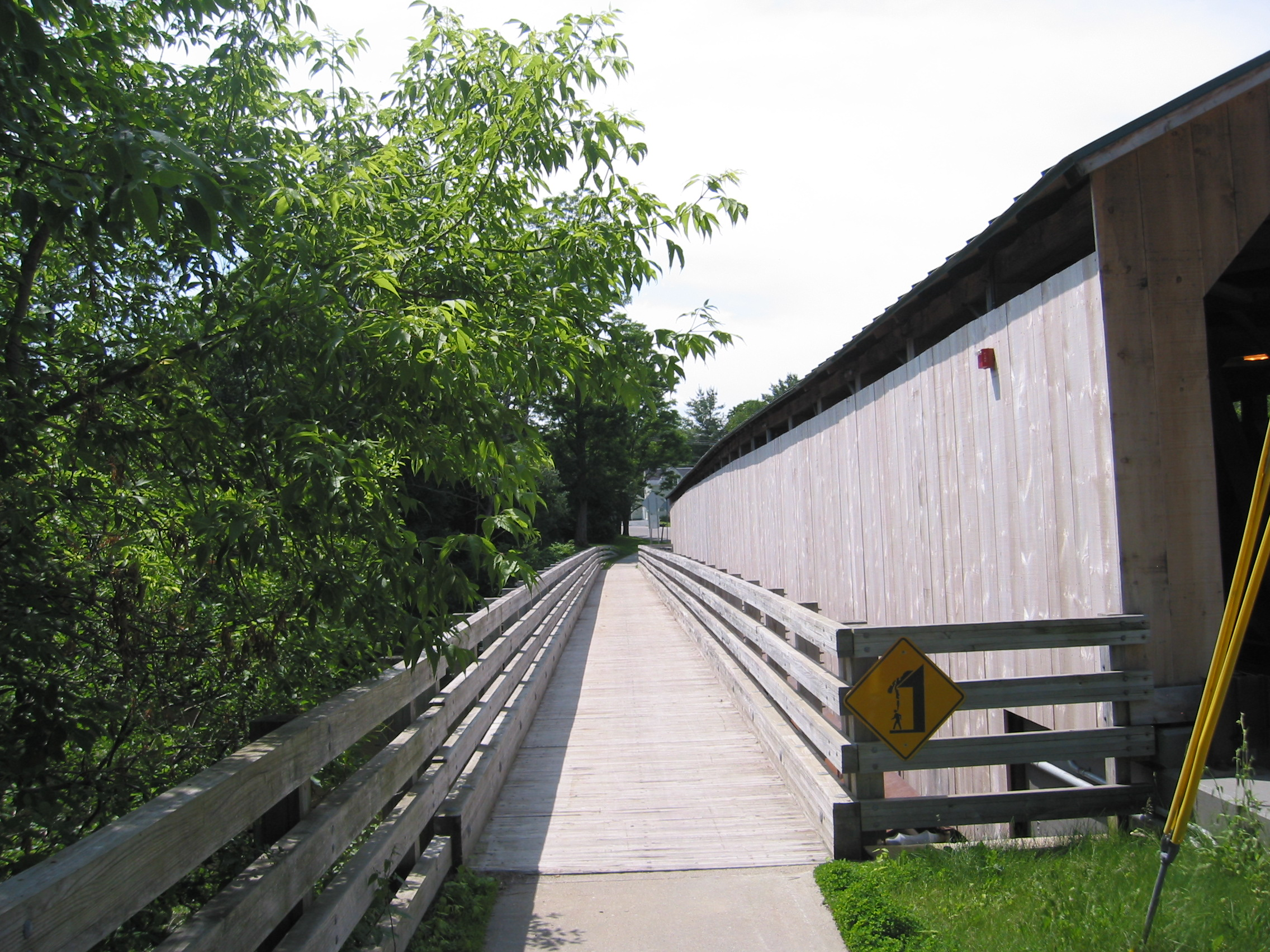
Pulp Mill Bridge bicycle & pedestrian pathway, looking west from Middlebury, VT

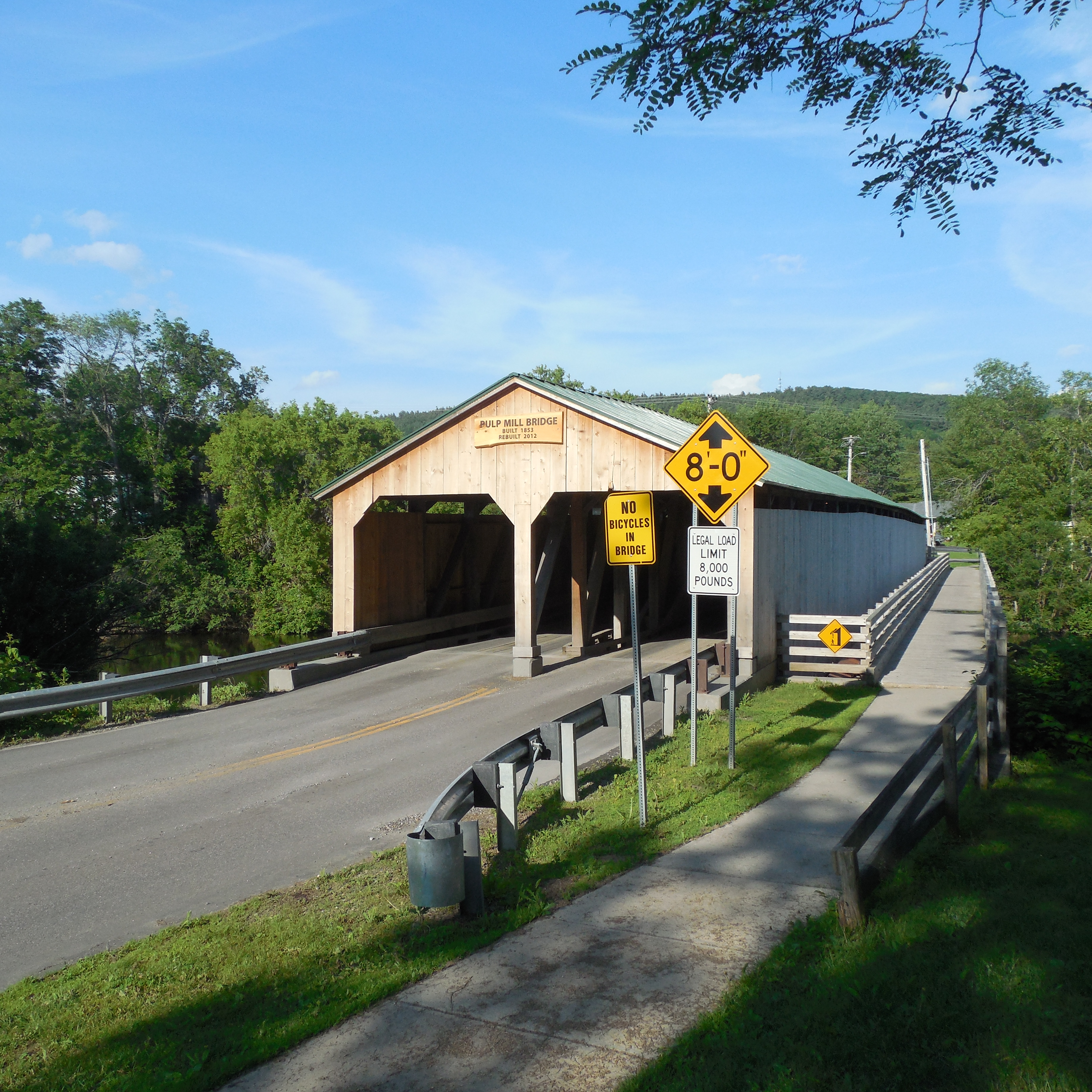
Pulp Mill Bridge (with bicycle & pedestrian way) looking east from Weybridge, VT: 13 Jun 2015

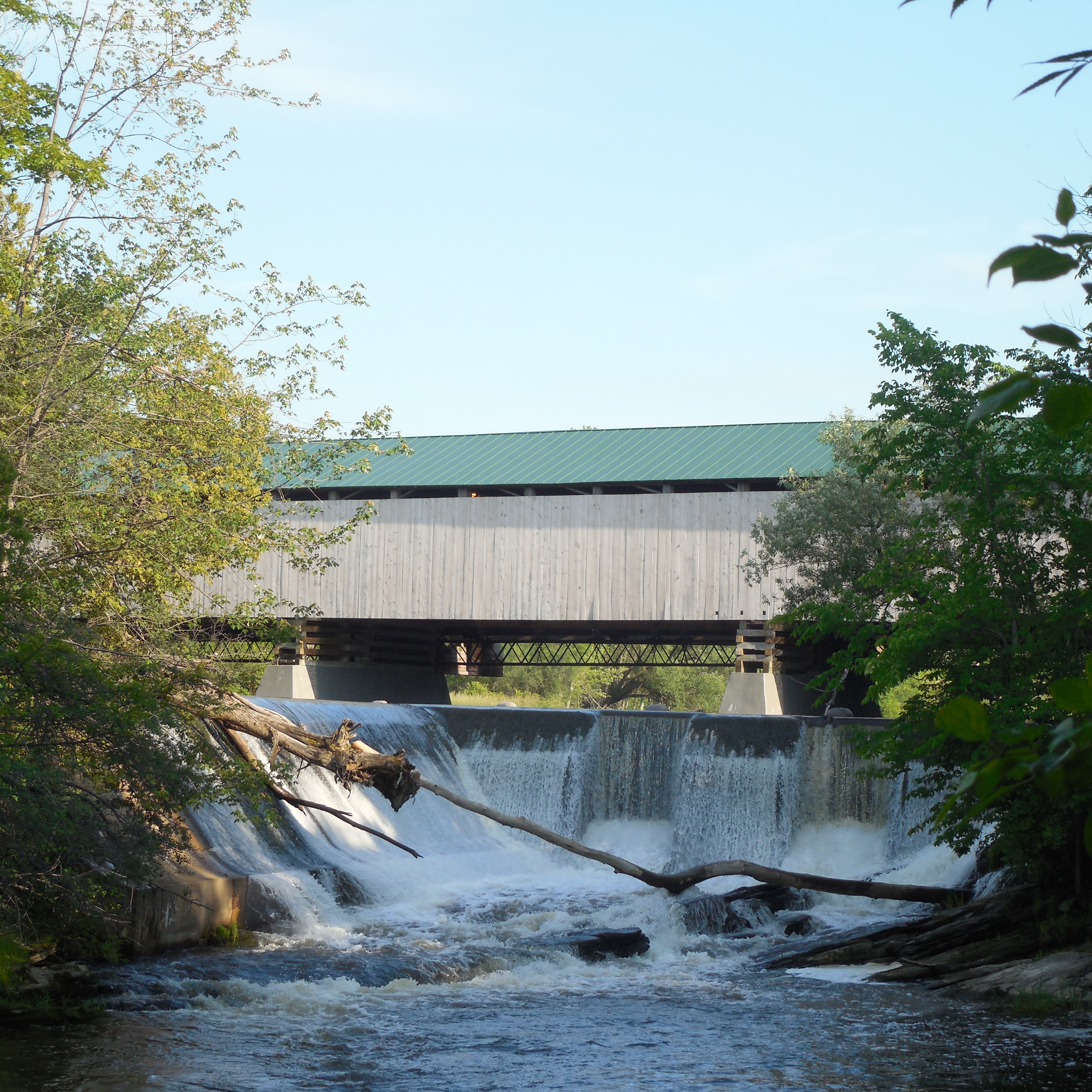
View of Pulp Mill Bridge from the north along Otter Creek: 13 Jun 2015

== See also ==
- List of Vermont covered bridges
- List of bridges documented by the Historic American Engineering Record in Vermont
- List of bridges on the National Register of Historic Places in Vermont
- National Register of Historic Places listings in Addison County, Vermont
