= Belvidere, Vermont =

- Town
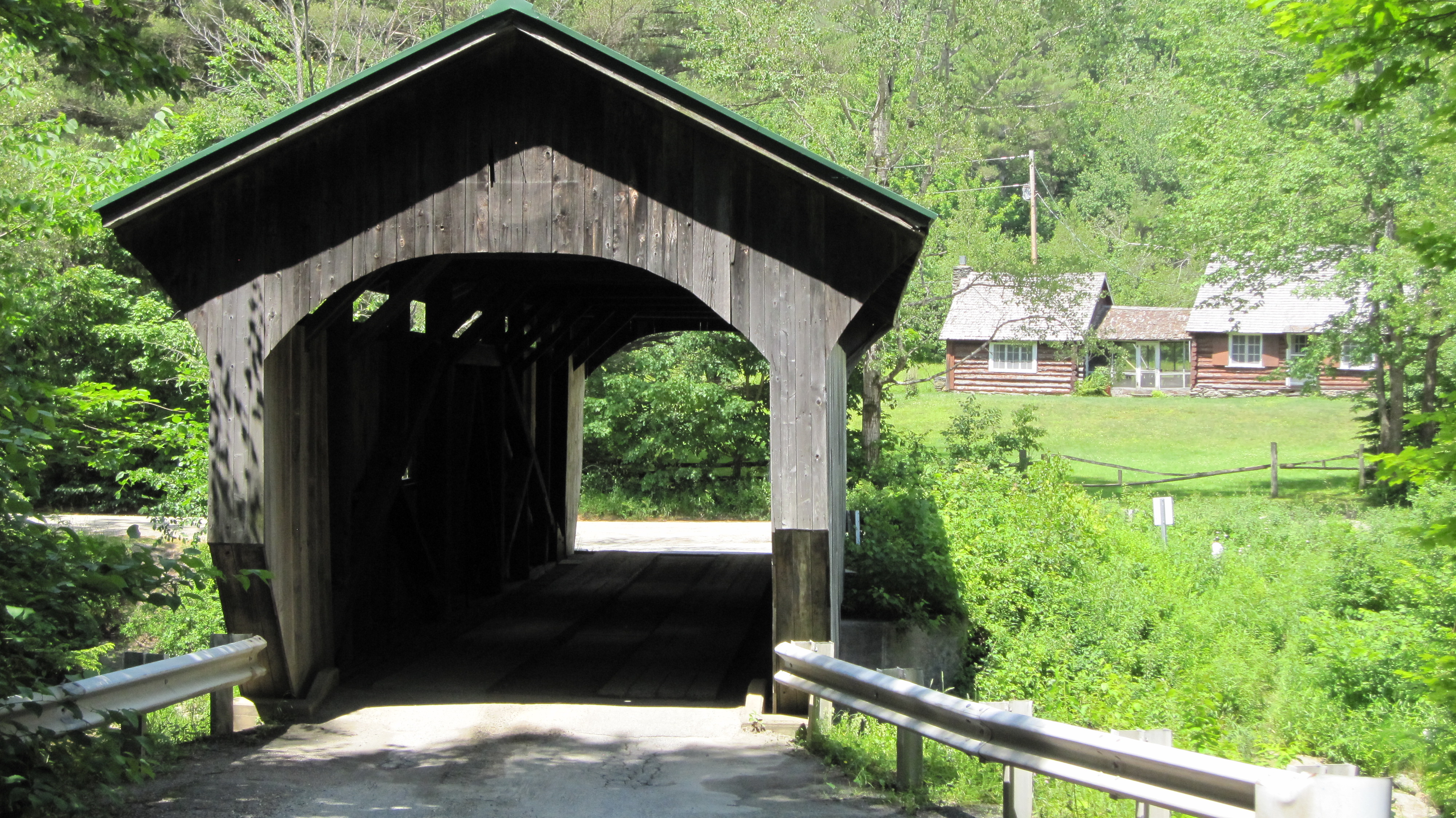
- Morgan Covered Bridge

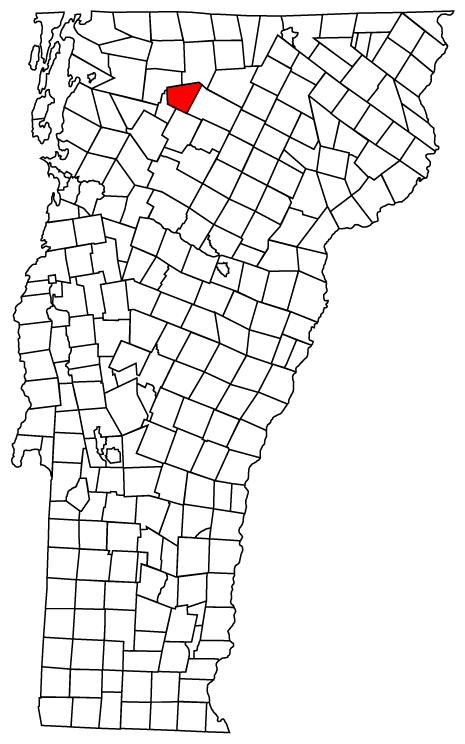
- Belvidere, Vermont
- Coordinates: 44°45′49″N 72°39′50″W
- Country: United States
- State: Vermont
- County: Lamoille
- Communities: Belvidere Center; Belvidere Corners; Belvidere Junction

Area
  - Total: 32.14 sq mi (83.24 km^{2})
  - Land: 32.09 sq mi (83.10 km^{2})
  - Water: 0.050 sq mi (0.13 km^{2})
- Elevation: 1,240 ft (380 m)

Population (2020)
  - Total: 358
  - Density: 11/sq mi (4.3/km^{2})
- Time zone: UTC-5 (Eastern (EST))
  - Summer (DST): UTC-4 (EDT)
- ZIP code: 05442
- Area code: 802
- FIPS code: 50-04375
- GNIS feature ID: 1462038
- Website: townofbelviderevt.com

Belvidere is a town in Lamoille County, Vermont, United States. The population was 358 at the 2020 census. Belvidere contains the hamlets of Belvidere Center, Belvidere Corners and Belvidere Junction. In 1963, part of Averys Gore in Franklin County became part of Belvidere, while the other part became part of Montgomery.

== Geography ==
Belvidere is the northernmost town in Lamoille County and is bordered by Franklin County to the north. According to the United States Census Bureau, the town has a total area of 32.1 square miles (83.2 km^{2}), of which 0.04 square miles (0.1 km^{2}), or 0.16%, are water. The North Branch of the Lamoille River flows east to west across the center of the town, and most of the town's settlement is in the North Branch valley. Vermont Route 109 runs up the valley and has its eastern terminus at Vermont Route 118 at Belvidere Corners in the eastern part of town. Route 109 leads southwest 11 miles (18 km) to Jeffersonville, while Route 118 leads north 10 miles (16 km) to Montgomery and southeast 8 miles (13 km) to Eden.

== Demographics ==
Historical population
Census	Pop.	Note	%±
1810	217		—
1820	198		−8.8%
1830	185		−6.6%
1840	207		11.9%
1850	256		23.7%
1860	366		43.0%
1870	369		0.8%
1880	400		8.4%
1890	571		42.8%
1900	428		−25.0%
1910	429		0.2%
1920	363		−15.4%
1930	258		−28.9%
1940	220		−14.7%
1950	207		−5.9%
1960	155		−25.1%
1970	189		21.9%
1980	218		15.3%
1990	228		4.6%
2000	294		28.9%
2010	348		18.4%
2020	358		2.9%
U.S. Decennial Census

As of the census of 2000, there were 294 people, 114 households, and 71 families residing in the town. The population density was 9.1 people per square mile (3.5/km^{2}). There were 194 housing units at an average density of 6.0 per square mile (2.3/km^{2}). The racial makeup of the town was 99.66% White, and 0.34% from two or more races. Hispanic or Latino of any race were 0.34% of the population.

There were 114 households, out of which 36.8% had children under the age of 18 living with them, 55.3% were married couples living together, 2.6% had a female householder with no husband present, and 37.7% were non-families. 24.6% of all households were made up of individuals, and 8.8% had someone living alone who was 65 years of age or older. The average household size was 2.58 and the average family size was 3.14.

In the town, the population was spread out, with 27.9% under the age of 18, 7.8% from 18 to 24, 34.4% from 25 to 44, 18.4% from 45 to 64, and 11.6% who were 65 years of age or older. The median age was 35 years. For every 100 females, there were 101.4 males. For every 100 females age 18 and over, there were 98.1 males.

The median income for a household in the town was $44,583, and the median income for a family was $50,500. Males had a median income of $36,250 versus $25,500 for females. The per capita income for the town was $19,081. About 8.8% of families and 9.4% of the population were below the poverty line, including 16.9% of those under the age of eighteen and 8.6% of those 65 or over.

== Notable person ==
- Berthold C. Coburn, member of the Vermont House of Representatives, Democratic nominee for governor in 1946
