= Lemon Fair River =

River in Vermont, U.S.

Coordinates: 43.812533°N 73.228095°W

Lemon Fair River is a river in Addison County and Rutland County, in the U.S. state of Vermont.

Les monts verts, the French name for the Green Mountains, is thought to be the source of the name.

The Lemon Fair begins in the fields and farmlands of southern Orwell, Vermont. From there it flows north, gaining tributaries, eventually draining into the Otter Creek by Route 23 in Weybridge, Vermont.

The Lemon Fair is home to many forms of wildlife, including fish such as bass, northern pike, and bullhead. However, unlike other rivers around, it does not drain mountainous areas, only farmland. As such, the water quality is poorer than other rivers.

== See also ==
- List of rivers of Vermont
