= Kazon Building =

- U.S. National Register of Historic Places
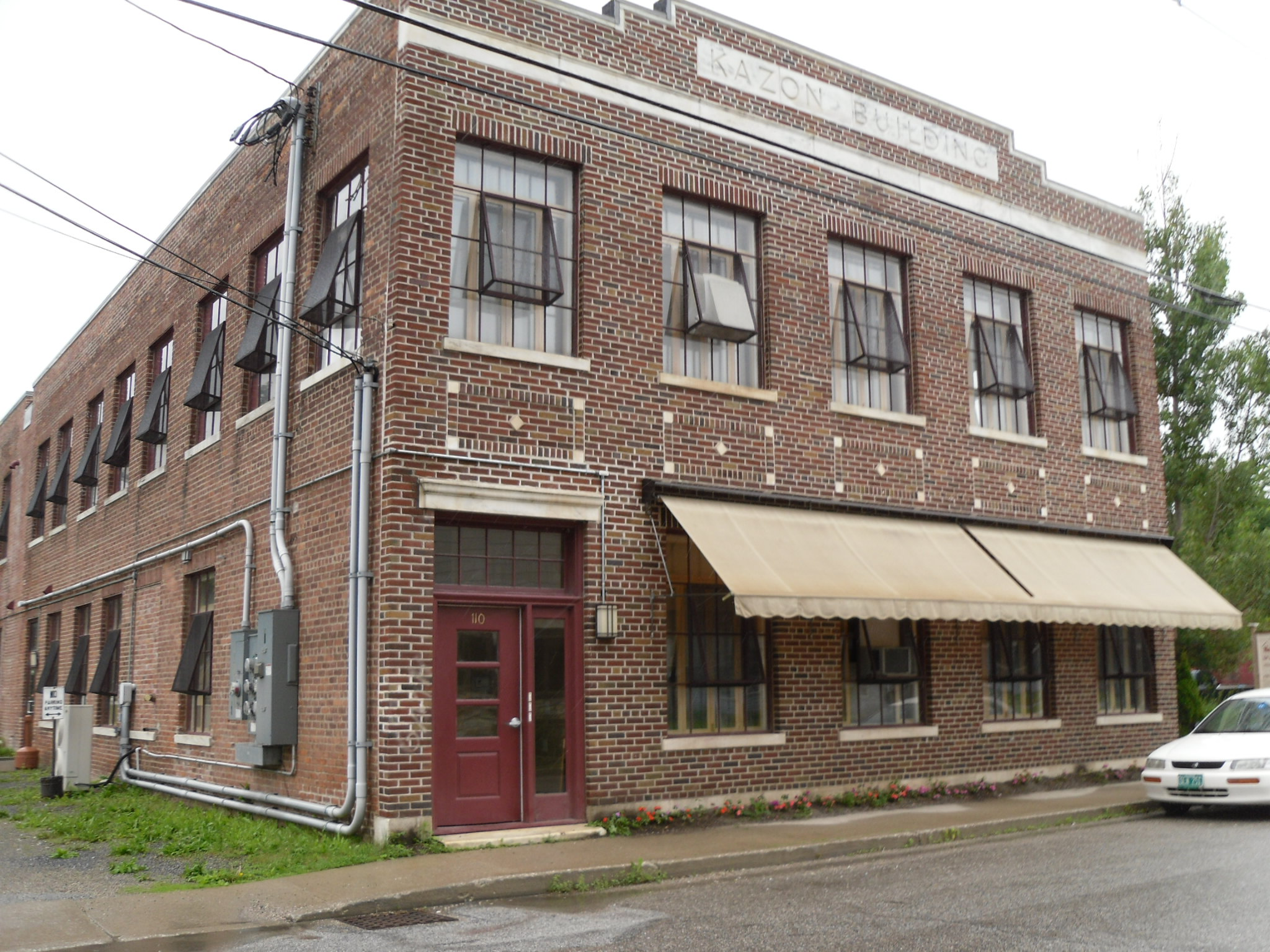

- Location within Vermont Location within the United States
- Location: 50 Marble St., West Rutland, Vermont
- Coordinates: 43°35′46″N 73°2′54″W
- Area: 0.3 acres (0.12 ha)
- Built: 1929
- Architectural style: Early Commercial
- NRHP reference No.: 04000769
- Added to NRHP: July 28, 2004

The Kazon Building is a historic industrial building at 50 Marble Street in West Rutland, Vermont. Built in 1929, it is a well-preserved local example of a purpose-built garment factory, built by Louis Kazon, a leading local businessman in that industry. It was listed on the National Register of Historic Places in 2004. It has been converted to mixed office and residential use.

== Description and history ==
The Kazon Building is located in central West Rutland, on the north side of Marble Street, near its junction with Campbell Avenue. It is a two-story brick and masonry building, with a front facade 40 feet (12 m) wide, and a length of 120 feet (37 m). The front is five bays wide, with the entrance in the left bay, and large fixed 16-pane windows in the other bays. The windows have marble sills, and there is brick and marble decorative panelwork between the floors. A parapet obscures the flat roof, with a marble panel inscribed "KAZON BUILDING" at its center. The interior originally house an open work space on the upper floor and an office area at the front of the first floor; most of the work area has now been converted to residences.

Louis Kazon was a Jewish immigrant, who moved to the Rutland area in 1919, at first managing the textile factories of others, before opening his own garment shop in Rutland in 1921. In 1929 he built the present factory building, taking advantage of a tax benefit offered by the town of West Rutland. The Kazon Manufacturing Company was incorporated in 1933, and operated at these premises until 1948, producing apparel for men and women and employing about 125 workers, mainly the wives and daughters of area marble workers. Kazon was a major figure in the area's Jewish community, and was one of the founders of the Rutland Jewish Center.

== See also ==
- National Register of Historic Places listings in Rutland County, Vermont
