= Homer Waldo Farm =

Historic farm complex in Vermont

- U.S. National Register of Historic Places
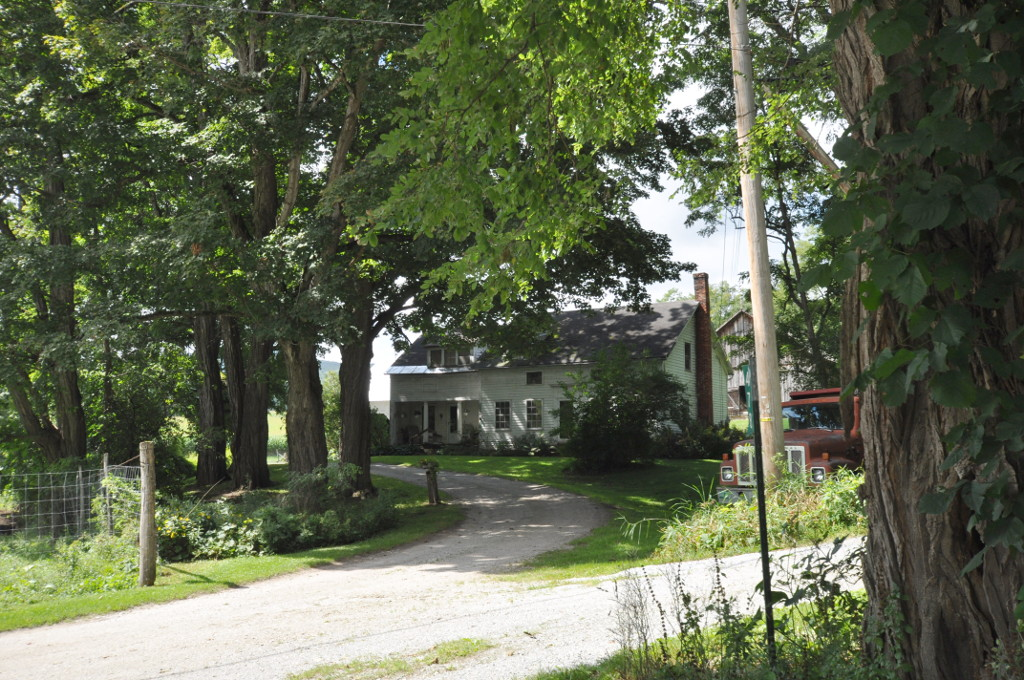

- Location within Vermont Location within the United States
- Location: Waldo Ln., Wallingford, Vermont
- Coordinates: 43°27′53″N 72°58′57″W
- Area: 5 acres (2.0 ha)
- Built: 1840
- MPS: Rural Otter Creek Valley MRA
- NRHP reference No.: 86003215
- Added to NRHP: November 26, 1986

The Homer Waldo Farm is a historic farm complex on Waldo Lane in Wallingford, Vermont. Developed in the mid-19th century, it resembles a typical detached Vermont hillside farm complex, a contrast to the farms found further south on the valley floor of Otter Creek in southern Wallingford. The property was listed on the National Register of Historic Places in 1986.

== Description and history ==
The Homer Waldo Farm stands on the west side of Waldo Lane, a former alignment of Wallingford's main north-south road (now bypassed by the current alignment of United States Route 7), just south of Wallingford's village center and across Otter Creek. The farm complex includes a house, horse barn, and two dairy barns, all dating to the mid-19th century, and an early 20th-century milkhouse. The house is a 1-1/2 story frame building, that is basically vernacular in style, with ornamentation limited to a transom panel, architrave and cornice, set above the entrance. The modest styling is in contrast to some of the more elaborate farmhouses found further south in the Otter River valley.

The farmhouse was built about 1840 by an unknown farmer. Its first documented owner was Alfred Hull, who sold the farm to Homer Waldo in 1866. The farm was owned by the Waldos for about 50 years, and was owned for much of the 20th century by the Davenport family, who owned the adjacent farm to the south and ran a dairy operation.

== See also ==
- National Register of Historic Places listings in Rutland County, Vermont
