= Poultney Central School =

- U.S. National Register of Historic Places
- U.S. Historic district – Contributing property
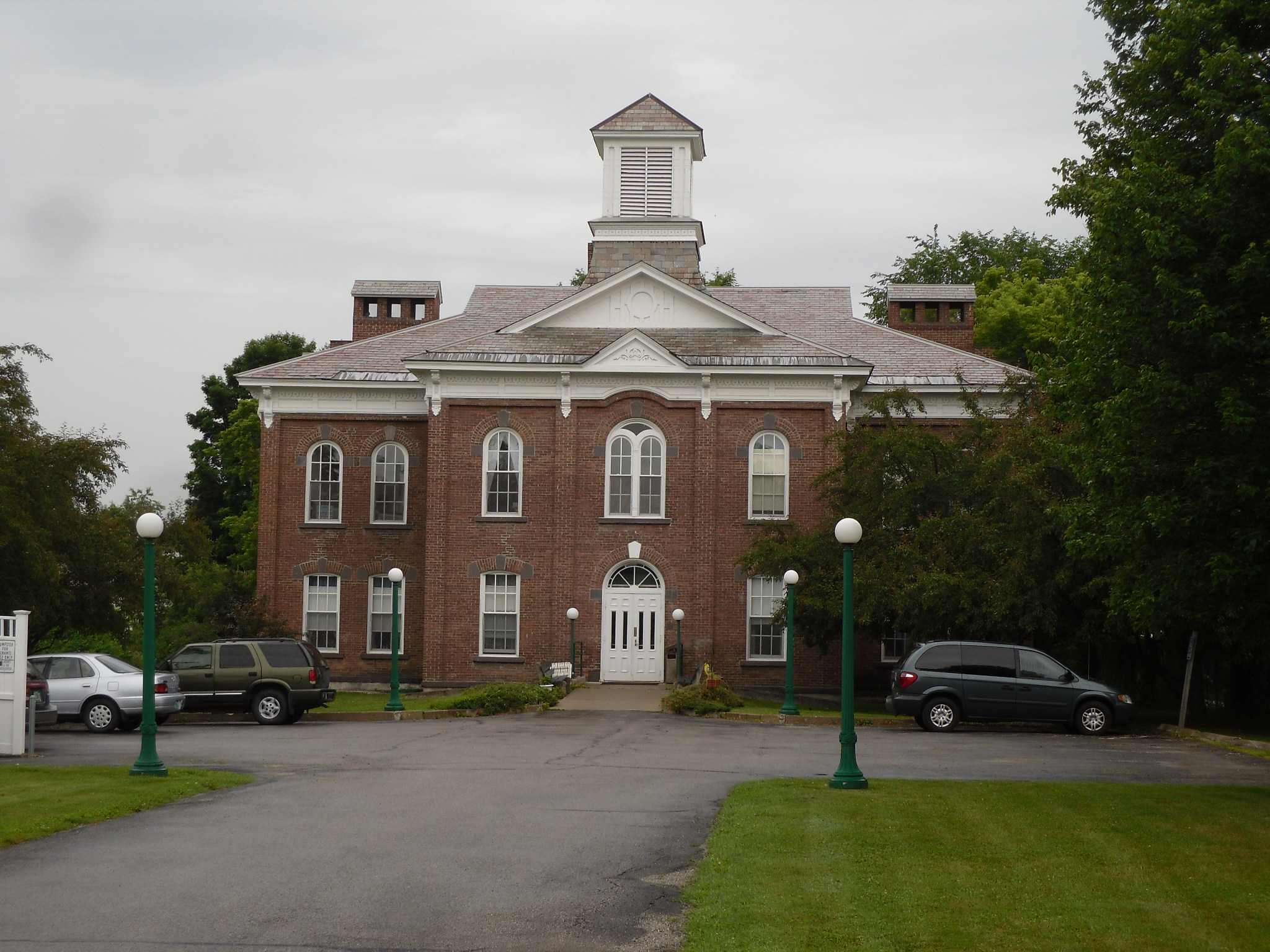

- Location within Vermont Location within the United States
- Location: Main St., Poultney, Vermont
- Coordinates: 43°31′4″N 73°14′6″W
- Area: less than one acre
- Built: 1885
- Built by: Wilson, Ashley
- Architectural style: Italianate, High Victorian
- Part of: Poultney Main Street Historic District (ID88000649)
- NRHP reference No.: 77000100

Significant dates
- Added to NRHP: March 25, 1977
- Designated CP: June 2, 1988

The Poultney Central School is a historic former school building on Main Street in the village center of Poultney, Vermont. Built in 1885, it is a high quality example of Late Victorian Italianate architecture executed in brick. It was listed on the National Register of Historic Places in 1977, and has been converted into residential use.

== Description and history ==
The former Poultney Central School is located in the village center of Poultney, next to the Poultney United Methodist Church. It is set back from Main Street, with a level grassy park in front, divided by the entry drive and parking area. The building is a 2-1/2 story wood frame structure, its exterior finished in red brick veneer. It is covered by a gable-on-hip roof, with a square cupola at its center. Center sections project to the north (rear) and south (front) facades, also toppedy by gable-on-hip roofs, with the side roof elevations pierced by dormers. The corners of the front facade and projecting section are highlighted by brick pilasters, which also divided the bays of the center section. Ground floor windows are set in segmented-arch openings, and second-floor windows are set in round-arch openings. The entrance is set in a round-arch opening, with a two-part round-arched window above.

The school was built in 1885 by Ashley Wilson, a local builder; its architect is not known. It is a distinctive landmark in Poultney's village center, with the park in front one of the few green spaces on Main Street in the downtown area.

== See also ==
- National Register of Historic Places listings in Rutland County, Vermont
