= National Register of Historic Places listings in Rutland County, Vermont =

Location of Rutland County in Vermont

This is a list of the National Register of Historic Places listings in Rutland County, Vermont.

This is intended to be a complete list of the properties and districts on the National Register of Historic Places in Rutland County, Vermont, United States. Latitude and longitude coordinates are provided for many National Register properties and districts; these locations may be seen together in a map.

There are 77 properties and districts listed on the National Register in the county, one of which is also a National Historic Landmark.

This National Park Service list is complete through NPS recent listings posted January 23, 2026.

Contents: Counties in Vermont
Addison - Bennington - Caledonia - Chittenden - Essex - Franklin - Grand Isle - Lamoille - Orange - Orleans - Rutland - Washington - Windham - Windsor

== Current listings ==
	Name on the Register	Image	Date listed	Location	City or town	Description
1	Nathan Allen House	Nathan Allen House	October 27, 1988 (#88002069)	VT 30; 43°21′45″N 73°11′07″W	Pawlet	
2	H. H. Baxter Memorial Library	H. H. Baxter Memorial Library	August 24, 1978 (#78000239)	96 Grove St. 43°36′44″N 72°58′53″W	Rutland	Now the Rutland Jewish Community Center
3	Benson Village	Benson Village	November 17, 1978 (#78000240)	Stage Rd. between Lake and Hulett Hill Rds. 43°42′33″N 73°18′38″W	Benson	
4	Braintree School	Braintree School	May 3, 2010 (#09000917)	9 Warren Switch Rd. 43°22′09″N 73°14′06″W	Pawlet	
5	Brandon State School	Brandon State School	November 12, 1999 (#99001346)	Off U.S. Route 7; 43°48′42″N 73°06′30″W	Brandon	
6	Brandon Village Historic District	Brandon Village Historic District	December 22, 1976 (#76000145)	U.S. Route 7; 43°47′52″N 73°05′18″W	Brandon	
7	Bridge 4	Bridge 4	November 5, 2009 (#09000892)	Vermont Route 31; 43°30′47″N 73°14′00″W	Poultney	
8	Brown Covered Bridge	Brown Covered Bridge	January 21, 1974 (#74000250)	2.9 mi (4.7 km) east of North Clarendon across the Cold River; 43°33′58″N 72°55′10″W	Shrewsbury	1880 bridge is one of the best remaining examples of a Town lattice truss.
9	Castleton Medical College Building	Castleton Medical College Building	March 11, 1971 (#71000058)	South St. 43°36′36″N 73°10′43″W	Castleton	
10	Castleton Village Historic District	Castleton Village Historic District	April 26, 1979 (#79000225)	Irregular pattern along Main and South Sts. 43°36′39″N 73°10′47″W	Castleton	
11	Chaffee-Moloney Houses	Chaffee-Moloney Houses	November 19, 2001 (#01001240)	194 and 196-98 Columbian Ave. 43°36′28″N 72°59′28″W	Rutland	
12	Clarendon Congregational Church	Clarendon Congregational Church	July 12, 1984 (#84003471)	Middle Rd. 43°31′06″N 72°58′16″W	Clarendon	
13	Clarendon House	Clarendon House	May 17, 1976 (#76000146)	Off VT 133; 43°32′55″N 73°01′18″W	Clarendon Springs	
14	Clementwood	Clementwood	September 27, 1980 (#80000338)	Clement Rd. 43°35′59″N 73°00′25″W	Rutland	
15	Colburn Bridge	Colburn Bridge	October 11, 1990 (#90001493)	U.S. Route 7 over Sugar Hollow Brook; 43°42′25″N 73°01′17″W	Pittsford	
16	Cold River Bridge	Cold River Bridge	November 14, 1991 (#91001608)	VT 7B over the Cold River; 43°34′12″N 72°57′59″W	Clarendon	Demolished in 2006
17	Cooley Covered Bridge	Cooley Covered Bridge	January 24, 1974 (#74000251)	1.2 mi (1.9 km) south of Pittsford across Furnace Brook; 43°41′24″N 73°01′45″W	Pittsford	
18	Crowley Cheese Factory	Crowley Cheese Factory	October 11, 1979 (#79000226)	Southwest of Healdville on Healdville Rd. 43°25′26″N 72°47′13″W	Healdville	
19	Danby Village Historic District	Danby Village Historic District	February 10, 1983 (#83003219)	Main St., Mt. Tabor Ave., Depot St., and Borough Hill Rd. 43°20′50″N 72°59′47″W	Danby	
20	Dean Covered Bridge	Dean Covered Bridge	September 10, 1974 (#74000252)	South of Brandon, over Otter Creek; 43°46′43″N 73°05′51″W	Brandon	
21	Depot Covered Bridge	Depot Covered Bridge	January 21, 1974 (#74000253)	.8 mi (1.3 km) west of Pittsford across Otter Creek; 43°42′34″N 73°02′36″W	Pittsford	
22	East Clarendon Railroad Station	East Clarendon Railroad Station	March 8, 1999 (#99000262)	VT 103 and East Rd. 43°31′34″N 72°56′00″W	Clarendon	
23	East Poultney Historic District	East Poultney Historic District	January 31, 1978 (#78000241)	Village green and environs 43°31′31″N 73°12′24″W	East Poultney	
24	Fair Haven Green Historic District	Fair Haven Green Historic District	November 24, 1980 (#80000339)	Park Pl., Adams and Main Sts. 43°35′35″N 73°15′57″W	Fair Haven	
25	Forest Dale Iron Furnace	Forest Dale Iron Furnace	June 13, 1974 (#74000254)	VT 73 and Furnace Rd. 43°49′55″N 73°02′54″W	Brandon	
26	Fort Vengeance Monument Site	Fort Vengeance Monument Site	March 15, 2006 (#06000139)	U.S. Route 7, .57 mi (0.92 km) south of the town line with Brandon; 43°44′51″N 73°02′53″W	Pittsford	
27	Fox-Cook Farm	Fox-Cook Farm	November 26, 1986 (#86003228)	Off U.S. Route 7 on Cook Rd. 43°27′23″N 72°59′28″W	Wallingford	
28	Gifford Woods State Park	Gifford Woods State Park	April 23, 2002 (#02000414)	VT 100; 43°40′29″N 72°48′44″W	Killington	
29	Gorham Covered Bridge	Gorham Covered Bridge	February 12, 1974 (#74000255)	North of Proctor across Otter Creek off VT 3; 43°40′48″N 73°02′17″W	Proctor	
30	Green Mountain Cottage		March 11, 2021 (#100006222)	61 Church St. 43°24′54″N 72°49′12″W	Mount Holly	
31	Hager Farm	Hager Farm	November 26, 1986 (#86003224)	U.S. Route 7; 43°26′10″N 72°59′26″W	Wallingford	
32	Gen. Robinson Hall House	Gen. Robinson Hall House	November 26, 1986 (#86003221)	U.S. Route 7; 43°25′47″N 72°59′24″W	Wallingford	
33	Hammond Covered Bridge	Hammond Covered Bridge	January 21, 1974 (#74000256)	Northwest of Pittsford across Otter Creek; 43°43′14″N 73°03′14″W	Pittsford	
34	Hosford-Sherman Farm	Hosford-Sherman Farm	May 12, 1995 (#95000572)	VT 30; 43°34′04″N 73°13′25″W	Poultney	
35	Hubbardton Battlefield	Hubbardton Battlefield	March 11, 1971 (#71000059)	Intersection of St. John and Monument Hill Roads; 43°41′43″N 73°08′18″W	Hubbardton	Boundary adjustments approved October 10, 2018.
36	Hulett Farm	Hulett Farm	November 26, 1986 (#86003220)	U.S. Route 7; 43°26′01″N 72°59′28″W	Wallingford	
37	Hyde's Hotel	Hyde's Hotel	April 11, 1980 (#80000340)	South of Sudbury on VT 30; 43°47′06″N 73°12′15″W	Sudbury	
38	Hydeville School	Hydeville School	November 21, 1978 (#78000242)	West of Castleton on VT 4A; 43°36′19″N 73°13′48″W	Castleton	
39	Immaculate Heart of Mary School		October 22, 2020 (#100005704)	10 Lincoln Ave. 43°36′32″N 72°58′32″W	Rutland	
40	Justsuitsus		January 26, 2026 (#100012621)	208 Mason Point Road; 43°38′32″N 73°12′21″W	Castleton	
41	Kazon Building	Kazon Building	July 28, 2004 (#04000769)	50 Marble St. 43°35′46″N 73°02′55″W	West Rutland	
42	Asahel Kidder House	Asahel Kidder House	February 7, 1997 (#97000024)	VT 22A, south of its junction with Bolger Rd. 43°34′26″N 73°15′50″W	Fair Haven	
43	Kingsley Covered Bridge	Kingsley Covered Bridge	February 12, 1974 (#74000257)	Southwest of East Clarendon across the Mill River; 43°31′25″N 72°56′30″W	East Clarendon	
44	Kingsley Grist Mill Historic District	Kingsley Grist Mill Historic District	November 8, 2007 (#07001170)	East St. and Gorge Rd. 43°31′27″N 72°56′26″W	Clarendon	
45	Laurel Glen Mausoleum-Laurel Hall	Laurel Glen Mausoleum-Laurel Hall	November 23, 1998 (#98001429)	VT 103, .5 mi (0.80 km) southeast of Cuttingsville; 43°29′05″N 72°52′49″W	Shrewsbury	
46	Linden Terrace	Linden Terrace	August 23, 2007 (#07000844)	191 Grove St. 43°37′07″N 72°59′06″W	Rutland	
47	Longfellow School	Longfellow School	December 12, 1976 (#76000147)	6 Church St. 43°36′31″N 72°58′42″W	Rutland	
48	Marble Bridge	Marble Bridge	November 14, 1991 (#91001609)	Main St. over Otter Creek; 43°39′40″N 73°02′02″W	Proctor	
49	Marble Street Historic District	Marble Street Historic District	March 1, 1990 (#90000338)	87-132 Marble St. and 10 Smith Ave. 43°35′51″N 73°02′40″W	West Rutland	
50	Middletown Springs Historic District	Middletown Springs Historic District	October 17, 1985 (#85003239)	East, North, South, and West Sts., Montvert Ave., and Schoolhouse Rd. 43°29′03″N 73°07′07″W	Middletown Springs	
51	Mission of the Church of Our Savior	Mission of the Church of Our Savior	October 29, 1992 (#92001479)	Mission Farm Rd. 43°37′09″N 72°45′25″W	Killington	
52	Mountain View Stock Farm	Mountain View Stock Farm	October 30, 1989 (#89001817)	VT 22A, north of Lake Rd. 43°42′30″N 73°17′50″W	Benson	
53	Thomas H. Palmer House	Thomas H. Palmer House	December 29, 1978 (#78000243)	2636 U.S. Route 7; 43°42′01″N 73°00′28″W	Pittsford	Currently the Inn at Logan's Run
54	Pawlet Town Hall	Pawlet Town Hall	December 13, 1995 (#95001449)	School St. 43°20′45″N 73°10′47″W	Pawlet	
55	Arthur Perkins House	Arthur Perkins House	September 27, 1988 (#88001579)	242 S. Main St. 43°35′30″N 72°58′08″W	Rutland	
56	Pittsford Green Historic District	Pittsford Green Historic District	May 13, 1982 (#82001704)	Main St. 43°42′26″N 73°01′44″W	Pittsford	
57	Poultney Central School	Poultney Central School	March 25, 1977 (#77000100)	Main St. 43°31′04″N 73°14′06″W	Poultney	
58	Poultney Main Street Historic District	Poultney Main Street Historic District	June 2, 1988 (#88000649)	Roughly Main St., E. Main St., Depot St., Knapp Ave., Beaman St., Grove St., Maple Ave., and College Ave. 43°31′02″N 73°14′05″W	Poultney	
59	Proctor-Clement House	Proctor-Clement House	June 17, 1982 (#82001705)	85 Field Ave. 43°37′36″N 72°59′11″W	Rutland	Now the Antique Mansion Bed and Breakfast.
60	Rural Otter Creek Valley Historic District	Rural Otter Creek Valley Historic District	March 31, 1987 (#86003212)	Roughly U.S. Route 7 west of Otter Creek; 43°27′03″N 72°59′13″W	Wallingford	
61	Rutland Courthouse Historic District	Rutland Courthouse Historic District	September 8, 1976 (#76000148)	U.S. Route 7; 43°36′25″N 72°58′29″W	Rutland	
62	Rutland Downtown Historic District	Rutland Downtown Historic District	August 22, 1980 (#80000387)	Roughly bounded by Strongs Ave., State, Wales, Washington, Pine, and Cottage Sts. 43°36′05″N 72°58′52″W	Rutland	
63	St. Stanislaus Kostka School and Convent House	St. Stanislaus Kostka School and Convent House	June 18, 2010 (#10000349)	95 & 113 Barnes St. 43°35′53″N 73°03′07″W	West Rutland	
64	Sanderson Covered Bridge	Sanderson Covered Bridge	June 13, 1974 (#74000258)	W of Brandon over Otter Creek; 43°47′22″N 73°06′45″W	Brandon	
65	Anthony Scoville House	Anthony Scoville House	August 24, 2007 (#07000845)	905 Dawley Rd. 43°28′25″N 72°50′02″W	Mount Holly	
66	Simeon Smith House	Simeon Smith House	March 3, 1983 (#83003220)	W. Haven Rd. 43°38′11″N 73°18′00″W	West Haven	
67	Simeon Smith Mansion	Simeon Smith Mansion	November 21, 1991 (#91001675)	Smith Rd. west of junction with VT 22A; 43°37′57″N 73°18′15″W	West Haven	
68	St. Peter's Church and Mount St. Joseph Convent Complex	St. Peter's Church and Mount St. Joseph Convent Complex	October 3, 1980 (#80000388)	Convent Ave., Meadow and River Sts. 43°36′08″N 72°59′10″W	Rutland	
69	Sudbury Congregational Church	Sudbury Congregational Church	October 28, 1977 (#77000101)	VT 30; 43°47′58″N 73°12′15″W	Sudbury	
70	Sudbury School No. 3	Sudbury School No. 3	November 2, 1978 (#78000244)	Junction of VT 30 and VT 73; 43°47′47″N 73°12′22″W	Sudbury	
71	Tinmouth Historic District	Tinmouth Historic District	June 25, 1980 (#80000425)	VT 140 and VT 2; 43°26′55″N 73°03′06″W	Tinmouth	
72	Homer Waldo Farm	Homer Waldo Farm	November 26, 1986 (#86003215)	Waldo Ln. 43°27′53″N 72°58′57″W	Wallingford	
73	Wallingford Main Street Historic District	Wallingford Main Street Historic District	November 1, 1984 (#84000424)	Main and School Sts. 43°28′17″N 72°58′38″W	Wallingford	
74	Watkins School	Watkins School	April 7, 2014 (#14000133)	26 Watkins Ave. 43°36′26″N 72°59′45″W	Rutland	
75	Wells Village School	Wells Village School	October 7, 1993 (#93001004)	Northern side of Main St. (VT 30); 43°25′05″N 73°12′25″W	Wells	
76	West Haven Baptist Church	West Haven Baptist Church	March 13, 2007 (#07000161)	48 Book Rd. 43°39′02″N 73°20′53″W	West Haven	
77	West Rutland Town Hall	West Rutland Town Hall	July 28, 1983 (#83003221)	Main and Marble Sts. 43°35′42″N 73°02′56″W	West Rutland	

== See also ==
- List of National Historic Landmarks in Vermont
- National Register of Historic Places listings in Vermont
