= Arthur Perkins House =

Historic house in Vermont, United States

- U.S. National Register of Historic Places
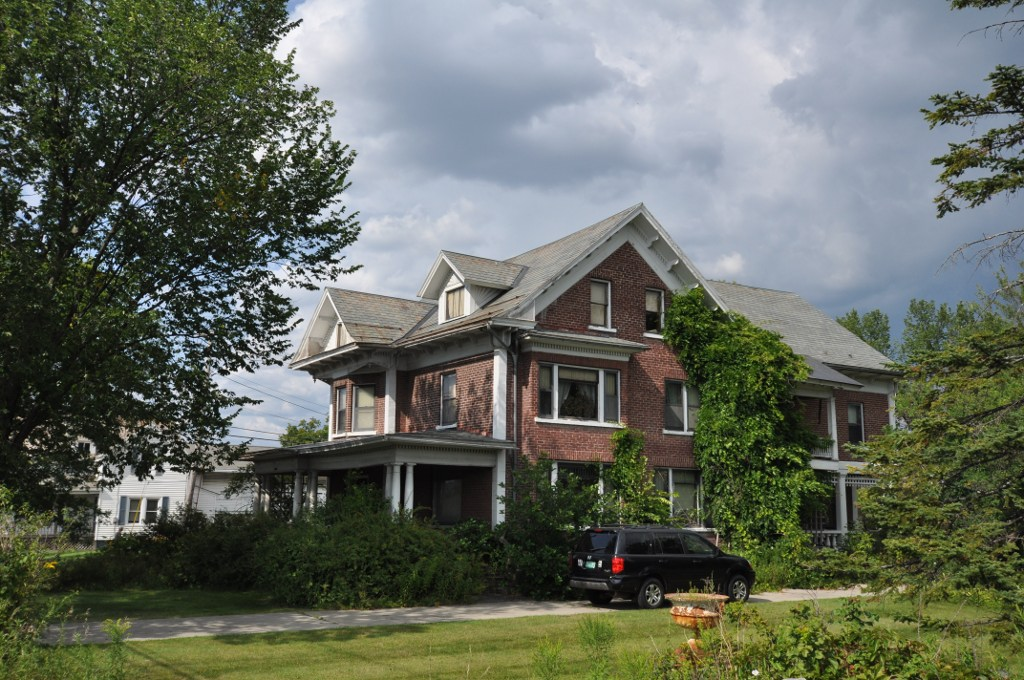

- Location within Vermont Location within the United States
- Location: 242 S. Main St., Rutland, Vermont
- Coordinates: 43°35′30″N 72°58′8″W
- Area: 1 acre (0.40 ha)
- Built: 1915
- Architect: Bissell, Albert J.
- Architectural style: Colonial Revival, Queen Anne
- NRHP reference No.: 88001579
- Added to NRHP: September 27, 1988

The Arthur Perkins House is a historic house at 242 South Main Street in Rutland, Vermont. Built in 1915, it is a Colonial Revival brick house with unusual cast and poured concrete trim elements. It was built for the owner of a nearby clay processing business. The house was listed on the National Register of Historic Places in 1988.

== Description and history ==
The Perkins House stands near the southern Rutland city limit, at the southeast corner of Curtis and South Main Streets (the latter designated United States Route 4). The area is now a mixed commercial and residential area. The house is a 2 1/2-story masonry structure, set near the front of a large landscaped lot that extends east to Chase Avenue. It has a gabled roof, the gable eaves extended and adorned with carved brackets, and the front roof facade pierced by a gabled dormer on the right, and a slightly projecting gable section on the left. The left section shelters a polygonal window bay on the second floor. A single-story hip-roof porch extends across the front, fashioned largely out of concrete, including precast Tuscan columns mounted on pedestals, with precast concrete balustrades between. The interior of the house retains original woodwork and other decorative features.

The house was built in 1915-16 by Albert Bissell for Arthur Perkins, owner of the Rutland Fire Clay Company, whose plant, then located just to the east, had been built out of fire resistant materials by Bissell five years earlier. Perkins' father founded the company in 1872, at first processing low-grade iron ore, but shifting to clay when the mines proved a better source of that material. Perkins took over the firm in 1898. The company plant was destroyed by fire in 1902, and its replace also succumbed to fire in 1910, sparking Perkins' interest in fire-resistant construction methods. The house's exterior is built largely out of such materials, with major structural elements of its porches made of concrete poured in place. Perkins served as mayor of Rutland 1927–35.

== See also ==
- National Register of Historic Places listings in Rutland County, Vermont
