= Hyde's Hotel =

- U.S. National Register of Historic Places
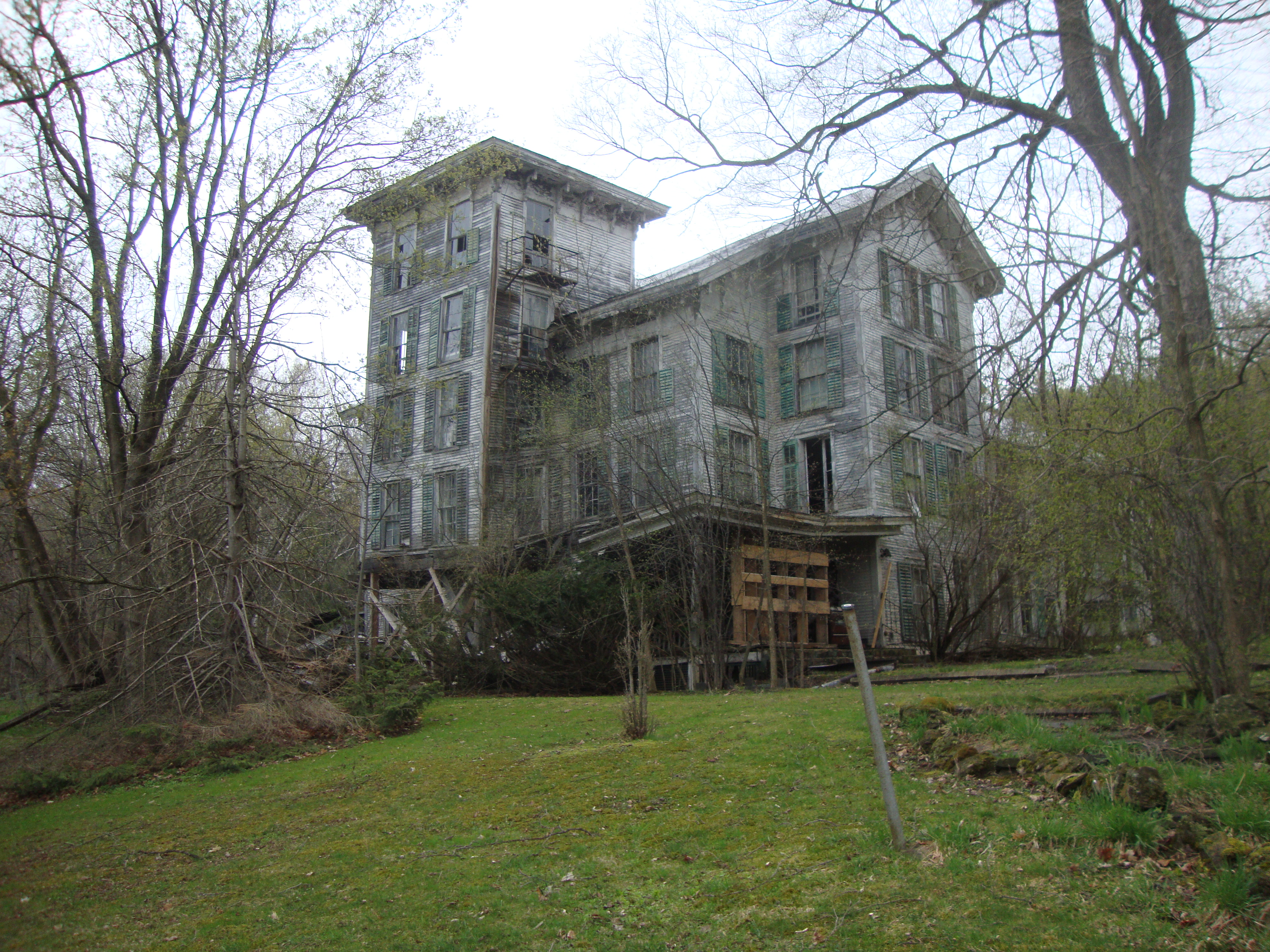
- The main manor house in 2010

- Location within Vermont Location within the United States
- Location: VT 30, Sudbury, Vermont
- Coordinates: 43°47′3″N 73°12′8.5″W
- Area: 100 acres (40 ha)
- Built: 1865
- Architectural style: Italianate
- NRHP reference No.: 80000340
- Added to NRHP: April 11, 1980

Hyde's Hotel, also known as Hyde Manor, was a major summer resort hotel on Vermont Route 30 in Sudbury, Vermont. The remnants of the hotel, its main house built in 1865, are now deteriorating and partially collapsed. The property was listed on the National Register of Historic Places in 1980.

== Description and history ==
Hyde Manor stands on the east side of Vermont Route 30, about 1 mile (1.6 km) south of Sudbury's village center. Now screened from the road by trees, the hotel's location once offered views across the valley to the west. It stands on 100 acres (40 ha) of land, and includes a deteriorating complex of mainly 19th-century buildings. The main house is a large four-story wood frame structure with Italianate styling. Its most prominent feature is a square tower, projecting from the front facade, five stories in height, with a bracketed hip roof.

The property's early history began in the early 19th century, as a tavern and stagecoach stop along the road, a major north-south route stage route between Albany, New York and Montreal. Pitt Hyde purchased an existing tavern in about 1801, and expanded the premises, which included a mineral spring reputed to have restorative properties. When the main house burned in 1861, James K. Hyde, Pitt's son, built the present surviving main house. The complex continued to grow under Aruna Hyde, who added amenities, including a bowling alley, dance hall, and, in 1909, a nine-hole golf course designed by Horace Rawlins and George Sargent. The property declined due to changes in recreational habits after the world wars of the 20th century, and was sold out of the Hyde family in 1962. It closed permanently in 1973, although water from its spring continued to be bottled and sold. The complex is now functionally abandoned and in deteriorated condition.

== See also ==
- National Register of Historic Places listings in Rutland County, Vermont
