= Chaffee-Moloney Houses =

Historic houses in Vermont, United States

- U.S. National Register of Historic Places
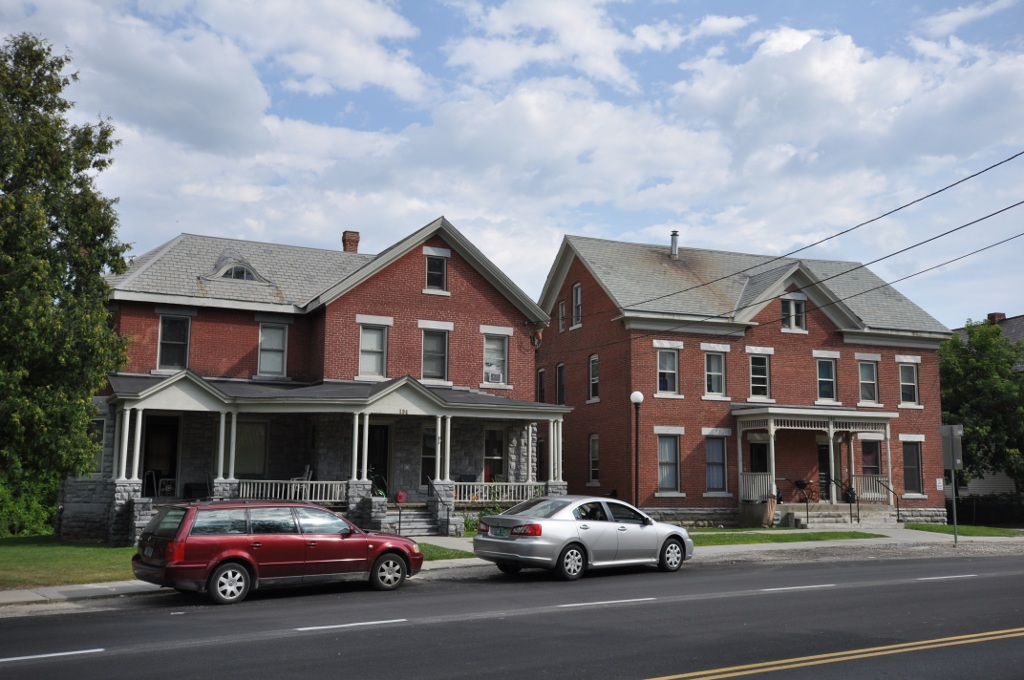

- Location within Vermont Location within the United States
- Location: 194 & 196-98 Columbian Ave., Rutland, Vermont
- Coordinates: 43°36′28″N 72°59′27.5″W
- Area: 0.7 acres (0.28 ha)
- Built: 1885
- Architectural style: Queen Anne
- NRHP reference No.: 01001240
- Added to NRHP: November 19, 2001

The Chaffee-Moloney Houses are a pair of brick residences (one single-family, one a duplex) at 194 and 196-198 Columbian Avenue in Rutland, Vermont. Built in 1885, they are fine examples of Queen Anne/Eastlake style, and are significant for their association with Thomas W. Moloney, an Irish-American attorney who played a major role the city acquiring its charter. The house were listed on the National Register of Historic Places in 2001.

== Description and history ==
The Chaffee-Moloney Houses stand on the west side of Rutland city, on the south side of Columbian Avenue, between an industrial area to the south and a residential area to the north. Both houses are 2 1/2-story brick structures. The duplex stands to the right; it has a gabled roof, with a low cross gable above the entrances. Its front is six bays wide, with a spindled porch sheltering the two entrances at the center. The left house is roughly L-shaped, with a hip roof across its main body and a projecting gable section on the right side. A porch extends across the front and around the left side, set on a foundation of rough-cut limestone blocks, with turned posts on stone piers and spindled balustrades in between.

Both houses were built in 1885 by Frederick Chaffee & Son. The duplex was occupied by a succession of middle-class families until 1925. The single-family was purchased by Thomas W. Moloney in 1892, at which time it was enlarged to its present size, although the front porch was added later. The house is the only known property associated with Moloney to survive. Moloney lived there from 1892 until his death in 1917, and was a prominent local attorney who played a leading role in the development of the city charter. In the 1890s he was a Democratic candidate for Governor of Vermont, and United States Senator.

In 1925 the duplex was converted for use as the "girls colony" of the Brandon State School, whose main campus was for mentally handicapped boys. Both the duplex and the Moloney house, which was vacated by the family after Moloney's wife died in 1936, were purchased by the state in 1944. A connector (since removed) was built between the houses in 1952. Its use by the Brandon State School ended about 1958, and the two buildings have since been converted into affordable housing units.

== See also ==
- National Register of Historic Places listings in Rutland County, Vermont
