= Immaculate Heart of Mary School (Rutland, Vermont) =

- U.S. National Register of Historic Places
- Location within Vermont Location within the United States
- Location: 10 Lincoln Ave., Rutland, Vermont
- Coordinates: 43°36′32″N 72°58′32″W
- Built: 1951
- Architectural style: International
- NRHP reference No.: 100005704
- Added to NRHP: October 22, 2020

The Immaculate Heart of Mary School is a historic school building at 10 Lincoln Avenue in Rutland, Vermont. Built in 1951, it is a rare example of International style architecture in the state, designed by Dirsa & Lampron of Manchester, New Hampshire. It was listed on the National Register of Historic Places in 2020.

== Description and history ==
The Immaculate Heart of Mary School is located just north of downtown Rutland, set between Lincoln Avenue and Nichols Street, north of West Street and just south of the eponymous church. The school is a two-story steel-framed structure, its exterior clad in light-colored brick, aluminum, and glass. The building is T-shaped, with single-story ell extending to its rear. It is covered by a flat roof with no eave. Its simple and clean lines are hallmarks of the Mid-Century Modern (and more specifically International) style of architecture popularized in the 1950s. The main facade has a central entrance section set in projecting walls, with a lattice of windows framing and surmounting a pair of glass doors. On either side of the entry extend slightly recessed panels with casement windows at their base, and rows of glass blocks above.

The school was built in 1951 for the Roman Catholic Diocese of Burlington, as part of a school enlargement program that paralleled the growth of public schools following World War II. It was designed by the Manchester, New Hampshire firm Dirsa & Lampron, and represents an early example of their International style work. The building is a relatively unaltered expression of their design, unusual in the region due to the harsh climate and its effects on some of the stylistic choices.

== See also ==
- National Register of Historic Places listings in Rutland County, Vermont
