= St. Stanislaus Kostka School and Convent House =

- U.S. National Register of Historic Places
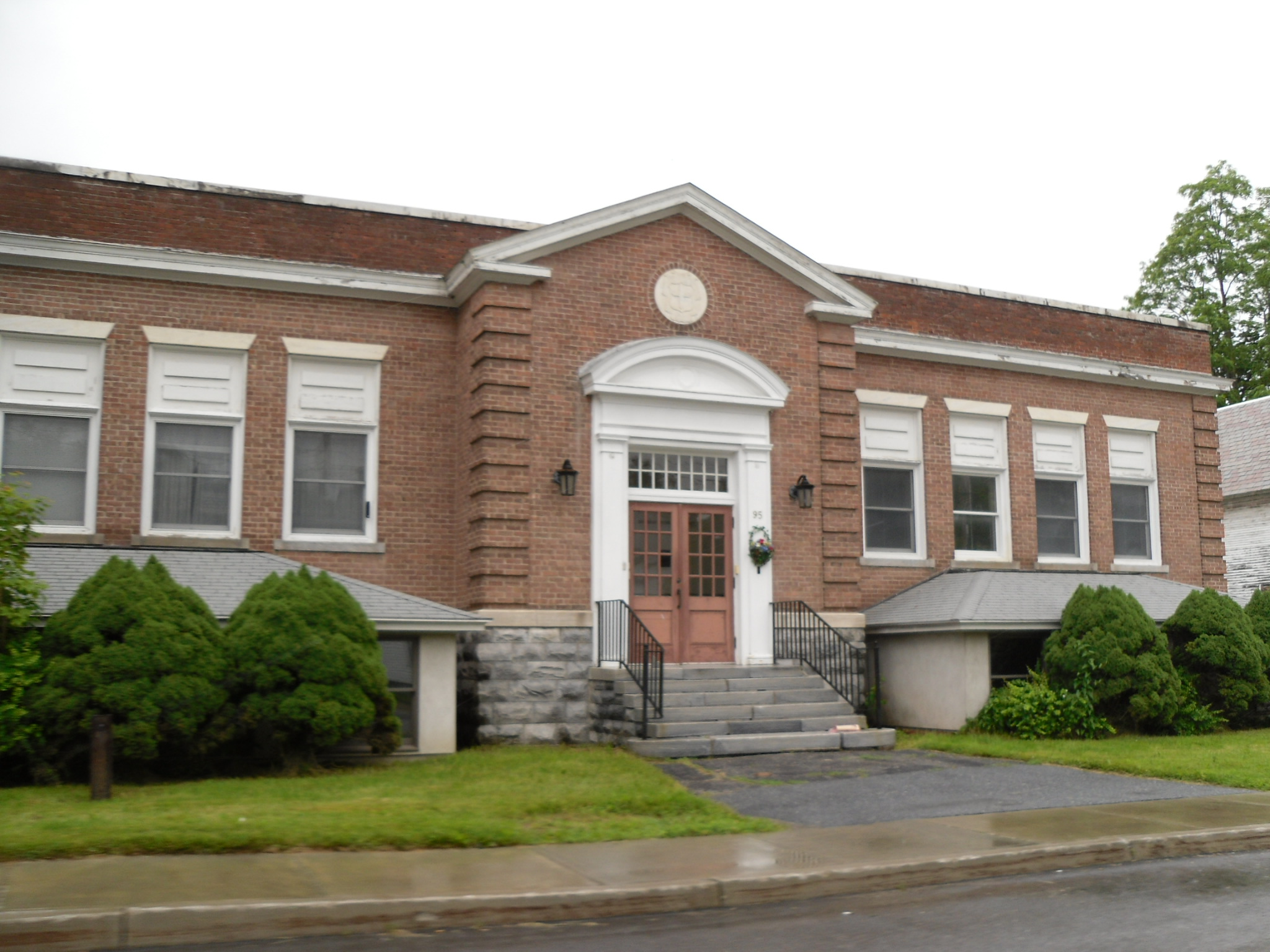
- The school

- Location within Vermont Location within the United States
- Location: 95 & 113 Barnes St, West Rutland, Vermont
- Coordinates: 43°35′53″N 73°03′07″W
- Area: 0.8 acres (0.32 ha)
- Built: 1922
- Architectural style: Colonial Revival, Classical Revival
- MPS: Educational Resources of Vermont MPS
- NRHP reference No.: 10000349
- Added to NRHP: June 18, 2010

The St. Stanislaus Kostka School and Convent House are a historic former religious school and convent at 95 and 113 Barnes Street in West Rutland, Vermont. The school, a small Classical Revival building, was built in 1924, and was an important element in the local Polish immigrant community; the convent is an adapted 19th-century single-family house. Both have been converted to conventional residential uses. They were listed as a pair on the National Register of Historic Places in 2010.

== Description and history ==
The former St. Stanislaus Kostka School and Convent stand northwest of West Rutland center, on the west side of Barnes Street, just north of the St. Stanislaus Kostka Church. The school is a single-story brick building with Classical Revival features. Its main facade is nine bays wide, with a central gabled projection that houses the main entrance. The interior of the building has been converted into residences.

The convent, standing just north of the school, is a large 2-1/2 story wood frame house, with a slate roof, clapboard siding, which was built c. 1850-60 and acquired by the diocese in 1922. The building appears to have undergone an enlargement in the late 19th century, as there is a full Italianate exterior entrance inside the front vestibule.

Polish immigrants began arriving in the Rutland area in the 1890s, and the St. Stanislaus Kostka parish was established in 1906, joining a number of already extant ethnically focused Roman Catholic churches in the region. School classes were held in the church until this school building was constructed in 1924, and the convent was populated by the Felician Sisters of St. Francis, who taught at the school. Both were closed in 1979.

== See also ==
- National Register of Historic Places listings in Rutland County, Vermont
