= Mountain View Stock Farm =

- U.S. National Register of Historic Places
- U.S. Historic district
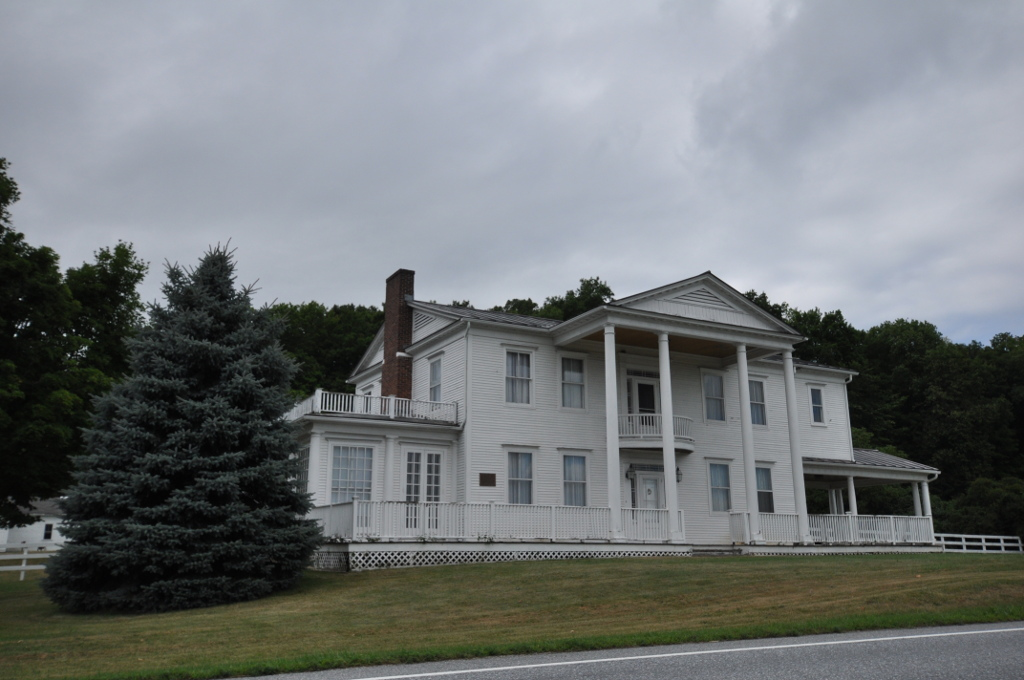

- Location within Vermont Location within the United States
- Location: VT 22A, N of Lake Rd., Benson, Vermont
- Coordinates: 43°42′30″N 73°17′50″W
- Area: 55 acres (22 ha)
- Built: 1810
- Architectural style: Colonial Revival
- NRHP reference No.: 89001817
- Added to NRHP: October 30, 1989

Mountain View Stock Farm, now known as Tylord Farm, is a historic estate farm on Vermont Route 22A in Benson, Vermont. Developed in the early 20th century around a late 18th-century farmhouse, the farm was renowned in the state for its breeding of Kentucky saddle horses and Chester White hogs. The farm complex also has architecturally distinctive Colonial Revival styling. The property was listed on the National Register of Historic Places in 1989.

== Description and history ==
Mountain View Stock Farm is located east of the central village of Benson, on a property roughly bisected by Vermont Route 22A, the main north-south route through the community. It consists of 55 acres (22 ha), mainly rolling fields, with broad views across the fields to the east. The buildings of the farm are clustered in three areas along the road, with the main house in the northernmost group. It is a T-shaped two-story wood frame structure, set on the west side of the road, with a gabled roof and clapboard siding. A two-story gabled portico projects in front, supported by slender round columns, a porte-cochere extends to the right, and en enclosed porch, topped by a balustrade, extends to the left. Nearby stand a 20th-century barn and indoor riding arena. A second house, along with barn, creamery, and cattle shelter, are clustered about 500 feet (150 m) to the south, and a third cluster including another house is another 800 feet (240 m) down the road.

The early history of the farm property is reflective of general trends in the area. First granted in 1788, it was owned in the early 19th century by Chauncey Smith, a prominent local physician and politician. The farm was first used for mixed crop production, and by 1850 was one of the town's most successful dairy farms, at a time when many local farmers were breeding sheep. In 1901 the property was purchased by Charles B. Parsons, president of the St. Joseph Lead Company of Missouri; Parsons' grandfather had been a tenant farmer on the land under Smith. Under Parsons the farm was enlarged and the house given its present Colonial Revival styling. His successor, William R. Bush, introduced the Chester White hog breed to the area, and expanded the farm to its greatest extent, about 1,200 acres (490 ha). Now reduced to a more modest acreage, it has been used since the 1970s for the breeding of horses.

== See also ==
- National Register of Historic Places listings in Rutland County, Vermont
