= Gen. Robinson Hall House =

Historic house in Vermont, United States

- U.S. National Register of Historic Places
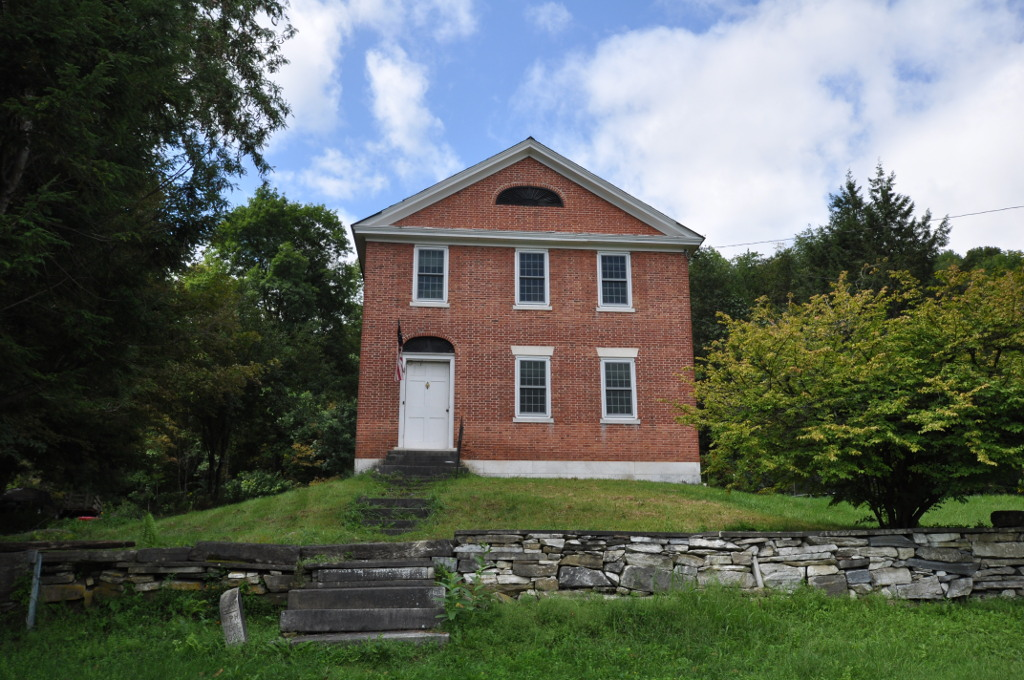

- Location within Vermont Location within the United States
- Location: 3144 US 7, Wallingford, Vermont
- Coordinates: 43°25′47″N 72°59′24″W
- Area: 5 acres (2.0 ha)
- Built: 1830
- Architectural style: Federal
- MPS: Rural Otter Creek Valley MRA
- NRHP reference No.: 86003221
- Added to NRHP: November 26, 1986

The General Robinson Hall House is a historic house at 3144 United States Route 7 in southern Wallingford, Vermont. Built in 1830, it is the surviving one of two nearly identical brick houses in this area, both built for members of the locally prominent Munson family. The house was listed on the National Register of Historic Places in 1986.

== Description and history ==
The Hall House is located in southern Wallingford, north of the village of South Wallingford, and a short way north of a point where the road and railroad are briefly in close proximity. The house is a 2 1/2-story brick structure, standing on the west side of the highway, with its front-facing gable oriented toward the road. The brick is laid in a combination of Flemish and common bond, with marble window sills and lintels, and marble stairs leading to the entrance. The entrance is set in the leftmost of three bays, in an arched opening with a louver above the door. A similar louver is found in the center of the fully pedimented gable.

The house was built about 1830 for General Robinson Hall, an officer in the Vermont militia who had married Sarah, the daughter of Isaac Munson, a prominent local landowner. The house is nearly identical to Munson's house, which stood further north on US 7 and was built about the same time. Hall was involved in the promotion and construction of the railroad through the area.

== See also ==
- National Register of Historic Places listings in Rutland County, Vermont
