= Sudbury School No. 3 =

- U.S. National Register of Historic Places
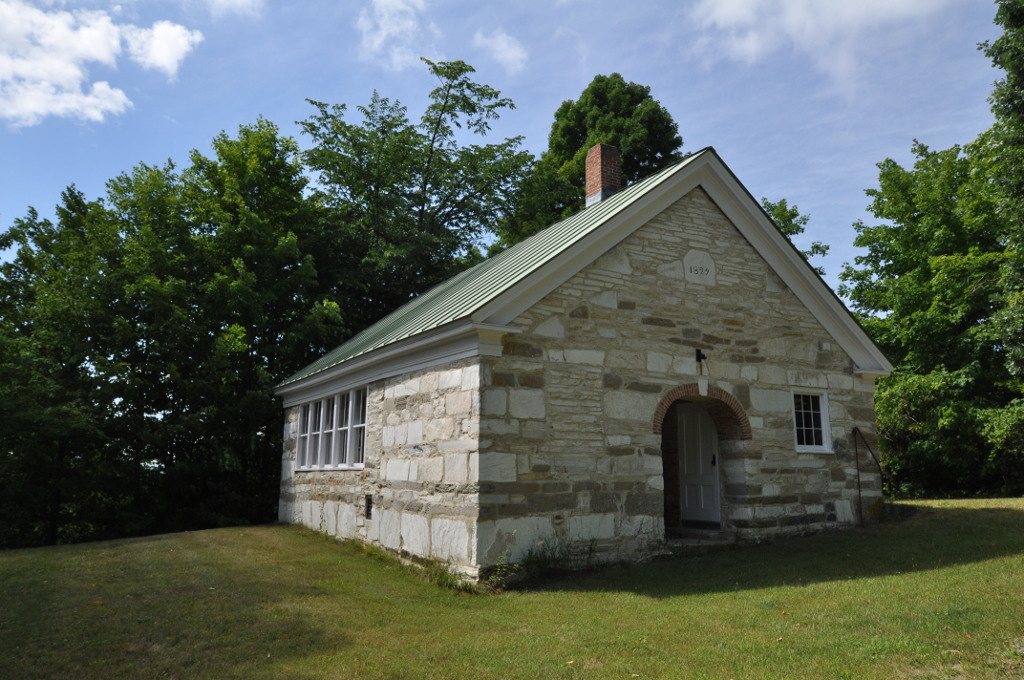

- Location within Vermont Location within the United States
- Location: jct. of VT 30 and VT 73, Sudbury, Vermont
- Coordinates: 43°47′47″N 73°12′22″W
- Area: 1 acre (0.40 ha)
- Built: 1821
- Architectural style: Greek Revival, Federal
- NRHP reference No.: 78000244
- Added to NRHP: November 2, 1978

The Sudbury School No. 3, also known as the Hill School, is a historic district school building at the junction of Vermont Routes 30 and 73 in Sudbury, Vermont. Built in the 1820s, it is a well-preserved example of the period, executed in stone. It was listed on the National Register of Historic Places in 1978.

== Description and history ==
The Sudbury School No. 3 stands a short way south of the village center of Sudbury, at the northwest corner of Routes 30 and 73. It is a single-story stone and brick structure, with a gabled roof. The main facade faces east toward Route 30, and houses an arched recess, lined and faced in brick. The building entrance is on the interior right side of the recess, while a matching doorway to the left (which led to a cloakroom, later converted to hold a furnace) has been filled in. The recessed archway was once flanked by small sash windows; one of these openings has been filled with stone, while the other has a modern sash window. The gable section of the facade includes a stone bearing the date 1829; it, and the stonework at the top of the gable suggest that the roof was raised after the building's initial construction. An entablature extends along the eaves of the side walls, with short returns on the ends. The building interior is reflective of early 20th-century renovations.

The school's construction date is uncertain. The town has documentation that a school was standing at this site in 1821, but it is not known if this was that building, or if it was built in 1829, the date given on the gable stone. Its massing and arrangement of windows are fairly typical for Vermont's 19th century district schools, although the use of stone is somewhat unusual, as is the entry vestibule, a clear adaptation to Vermont's sometimes harsh winter conditions.

== See also ==
- National Register of Historic Places listings in Rutland County, Vermont
