= Anthony Scoville House =

Historic house in Vermont, United States

- U.S. National Register of Historic Places
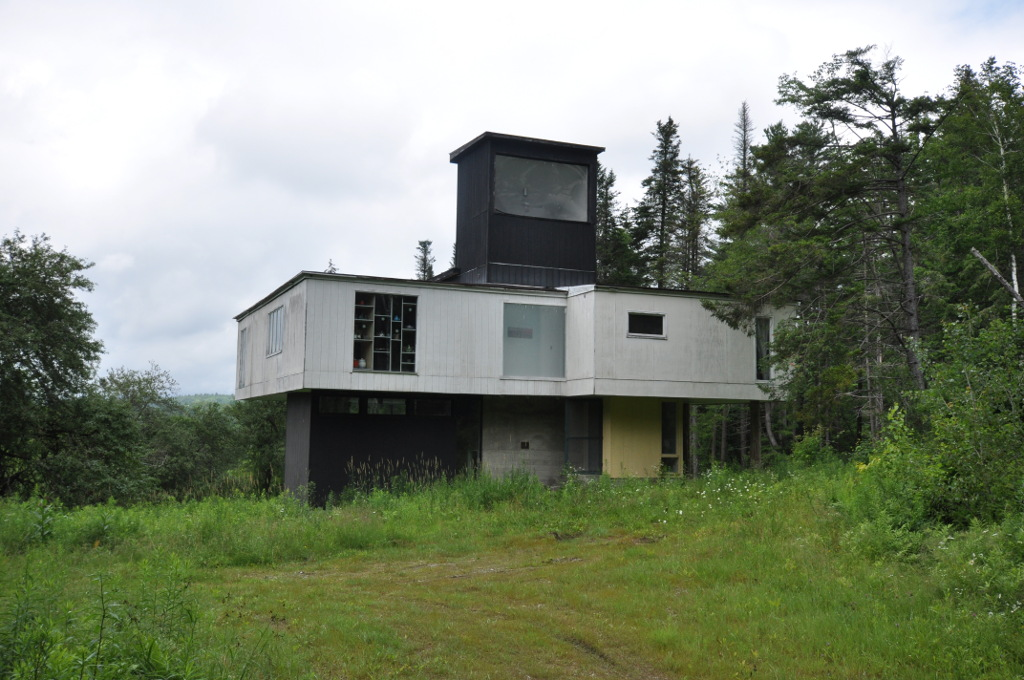

- Location within Vermont Location within the United States
- Location: 905 Dawley Rd., Mount Holly, Vermont
- Coordinates: 43°28′26.47″N 72°50′2.36″W
- Area: 9.9 acres (4.0 ha)
- Built: 1968
- Built by: Scoville, Anthony; et.al.
- Architectural style: International Style
- MPS: International Style in Vermont MPS
- NRHP reference No.: 07000845
- Added to NRHP: August 24, 2007

The Anthony Scoville House, also known as Corbu, is a historic house at 905 Dawley Road in Mount Holly, Vermont. Built between 1964 and 1968, it is a distinctive local example of the International Style of architecture, designed by architect Anthony Scoville for his own year-round use. The house was listed on the National Register of Historic Places in 2007. In early 2016, it was for sale.

== Description and history ==
The Scoville house stands on a rural 300-acre (120 ha) parcel of rolling terrain. The house is located on the west side of Dawley Road, a short way south of Shunpike Road, and is accessed via a long and winding drive that ends up approaching it from the south. The house is a square structure, with its second story overhanging the first on all four sides. A 20-foot (6.1 m) tall concrete tower rises at the center of the building. The upper level's exterior is characterized by tall casement and plate glass windows and vertical flushboard siding that is either composite particleboard (as originally built) or plywood (which has been laid over deteriorating portions of the original particle board). The ground level has exposed rough concrete walls as well as similar finishes to the upper level.

The house was designed by architect Anthony Scoville, a recent graduate of Yale University, and was built between 1964 and 1968 by fellow Yale students and friends of Scoville's, on land he had purchased a few years earlier. The house is based on the architectural ideals espoused by Le Corbusier, prompting Scoville to name the property "Corbu". The house bears some conceptual resemblance to Le Corbusier's Villa Savoye in France.

== See also ==
- National Register of Historic Places listings in Rutland County, Vermont
