= Hulett Farm =

- U.S. National Register of Historic Places
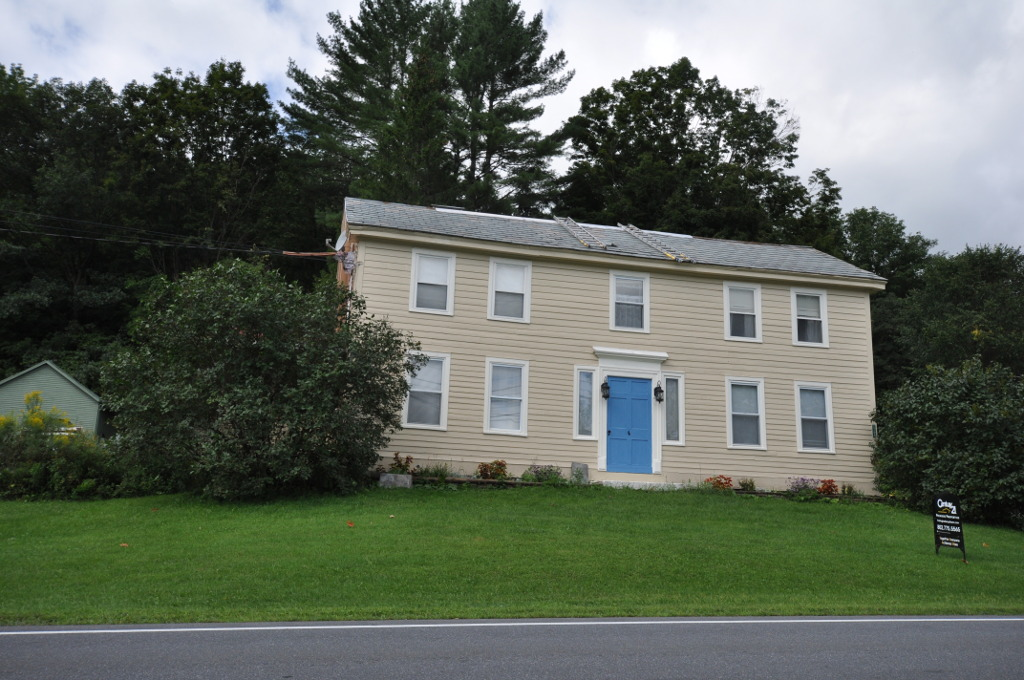

- Location within Vermont Location within the United States
- Location: US 7, Wallingford, Vermont
- Coordinates: 43°26′1″N 72°59′28″W
- Area: 5 acres (2.0 ha)
- Built: 1810
- Architectural style: Federal
- MPS: Rural Otter Creek Valley MRA
- NRHP reference No.: 86003220
- Added to NRHP: November 26, 1986

The Hulett Farm is a historic farmstead on United States Route 7 in Wallingford, Vermont. Its principal surviving element is a c. 1810 Federal period farmhouse, which is one of the oldest surviving farmhouses in rural southern Wallingford. The property was listed on the National Register of Historic Places in 1986.

== Description and history ==
The Hulett Farm complex is located primarily on the west side of US 7, roughly 1 mile (1.6 km) north of its junction with Dugway Road. The house, which is the only major surviving element of the farmstead, is a 2 1/2-story wood-frame structure, with a gable roof and a saltbox profile. The main facade faces west (toward the road), and is a symmetrical five bays, with a center entrance framed by wide sidelight windows and topped by an entablature and cornice. The saltbox extension to the rear is a 20th-century addition. Located southwest of the house is a small single-story wood-frame shed with a double-leaf door. The farmstead used to include a c. 1920s chicken coop, located north of the house, and a c. 1850 barn, located across the street;

The Hulett Farm was established in the early 19th century, and its house is one of only two in southern Wallingford that follows a typical Georgian plan. The Federal period sidelights are extremely unusual because of their two-pane width.

== See also ==
- National Register of Historic Places listings in Rutland County, Vermont
