= Hosford–Sherman Farm =

- U.S. National Register of Historic Places
- U.S. Historic district
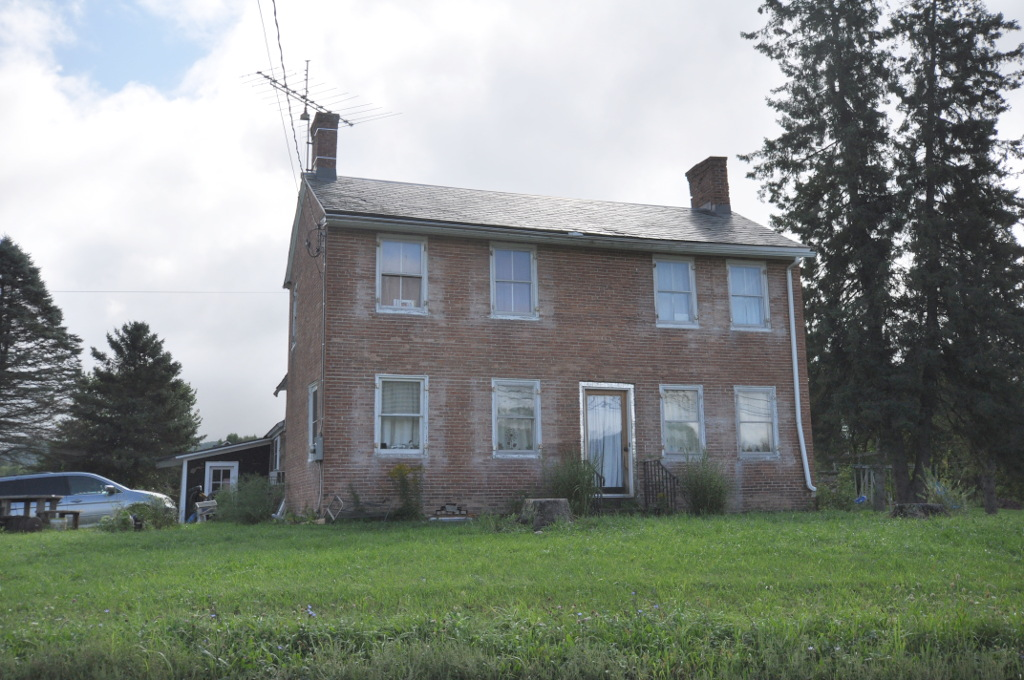

- Location within Vermont Location within the United States
- Location: VT 30, Poultney, Vermont
- Coordinates: 43°34′04″N 73°13′25″W
- Area: 122.8 acres (49.7 ha)
- Built: 1785
- Built by: Sherman, Olcott
- Architectural style: Early Republic
- MPS: Agricultural Resources of Vermont MPS
- NRHP reference No.: 95000572
- Added to NRHP: May 12, 1995

The Hosford–Sherman Farm is a historic farm property on Vermont Route 30 in northern Poultney, Vermont. Established in the late 18th century, the farm includes the original farmhouse, now an ell to a 19th-century brick house, and a late 19th-century barn, along with more than 120 acres (49 ha) of farmland. The property was listed on the National Register of Historic Places in 1995.

== Description and history ==
The Hosford–Sherman Farm is located in rural northern Poultney, its many farm complex divided by VT 30, about 0.5 miles (0.80 km) north of its junction with Saltis Road. Set among open fields, the dominant elements of the farm complex are its house and barn, both of which stand near the road. The barn, on the west side, is a large 2 1/2-story post-and-beam structure, with a late 19th-century core, to which a number of additions have been made in the late 19th and 20th centuries. A cross-gabled addition with overhead door at its center defines the street-facing front, and there is a round silo at the rear. The house, located across the street, is a 2 1/2-story brick structure, with an older attached 1 1/2-story ell. Basically vernacular, it is five bays wide, with end chimneys and an unframed center entrance. Behind the house is a combination tool shed and chicken house.

The farm was probably first established by Ebenezer Smith, who sold it in 1790, with a small house (presumed to be the ell of the brick house) included, to Reuben Hosford. Hosford farmed, and also operated a nearby tavern on the road, which (then as now) was the major north–south route through the town. His granddaughter married Olcott Sherman, who is credited with building the brick house. The property was, as of its listing on the National Register in 1995, still in the hands of Sherman's descendants, although the only remaining commercial agricultural activity was haying.

== See also ==
- National Register of Historic Places listings in Rutland County, Vermont
