= Benson Village =

- U.S. National Register of Historic Places
- U.S. Historic district
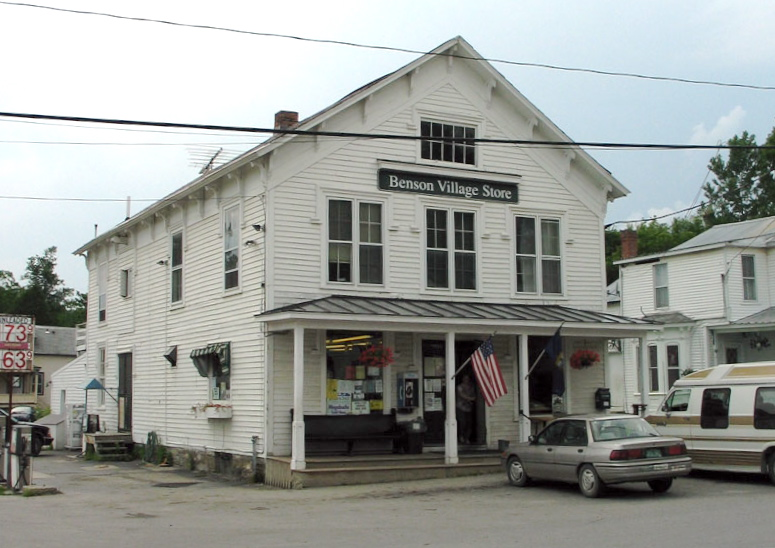
- The Benson Village Store

- Location within Vermont Location within the United States
- Location: Stage Rd. between Lake St. and Hulett Hill Rd., Benson, Vermont
- Coordinates: 43°42′33″N 73°18′38″W
- Area: 52 acres (21 ha)
- Architectural style: Mixed (more Than 2 Styles From Different Periods), Federal
- NRHP reference No.: 78000240
- Added to NRHP: November 17, 1978

Benson Village is the village center of the rural town of Benson, Vermont. The central portion of the village, stretching along Stage Road from Lake Road to Hulett Hill Road, is a historic district listed on the National Register of Historic Places as a well-preserved 19th-century village center.

== Description and history ==
The town of Benson, located in northwestern Rutland County on the eastern shore of southern Lake Champlain, was chartered in 1780 and settled in 1782. Its principal thoroughfare for many years was the Stage Road, completed in 1790, which was the major north-south route on the east side of the lake. The town was in the 19th century mainly an agricultural area, although there was some industry on the Hubbardton River east of the village, whose goods were delivered to a port on the lake west of the village. The height of its 19th-century economic prosperity was in the 1840s, and is reflected in the number of Greek Revival buildings in the village. Stage Road was eventually eclipsed in importance by Vermont Route 22A to the east. The economic decline effectively reduced the demand for new building in the village.

The focal center of the village is the junction of Stage and Lake Roads, where the Benson Village Store, post office, and Wheel Inn are located. The village stretches northward from this junction roughly to Hulett Hill Road. Many of its buildings were built either in the 1840s, or in the period of the 1870s-1880s, and are typically vernacular versions of Greek Revival and Italianate architecture. A notable exception is the Benson Village school, a Colonial Revival elementary school built in 1935.

== See also ==
- National Register of Historic Places listings in Rutland County, Vermont
