= Rural Otter Creek Valley Historic District =

Historic district in Vermont, United States

- U.S. National Register of Historic Places
- U.S. Historic district
- Location within Vermont Location within the United States
- Location: Roughly US 7 W of Otter Creek, southern Wallingford, Vermont
- Coordinates: 43°27′3″N 72°59′13″W
- Area: 110 acres (45 ha)
- Built: 1810
- Architectural style: Greek Revival, Federal
- MPS: Rural Otter Creek Valley MRA
- NRHP reference No.: 86003212
- Added to NRHP: March 31, 1987

The Rural Otter Creek Valley Historic District encompasses a rural agricultural area of southern Wallingford, Vermont. It includes nine past and present farmsteads along a stretch of United States Route 7 in the Otter Creek valley, with an agricultural history dating to the early decades of the 19th century. The district was listed on the National Register of Historic Places in 1987.

== Description and history ==
The Otter Creek valley south of Wallingford center was first settled in the late 18th century, with the first bridge crossing the creek built in 1783. Its most prominent early landowners were Israel and Isaac Munson, the former a wealthy doctor and merchant. Israel Munson first purchased land in the valley in 1814 for his younger brother Isaac, and their sister married Joel Hill, a Wallingford merchant. The surviving brick houses of Isaac Munson and Joel Hill are among the most imposing of the farmhouses in the valley. The wealth of Munsons in particular brought about a high quality of architectural work in the valley. One house, built for Isaac Bradley Munson, was (prior to its destruction by fire in 1980) one of the only known works of Asher Benjamin in the entire state.

The historic district extends roughly from the crossing of Otter Creek by US 7 in the north, to a point where the road again passes close to the creek several miles to the south. It is bounded on the east by the creek, and the west by a line about 500 feet (150 m) west of US 7. It covers about 110 acres (45 ha), mostly of lands that are presently or historically in agricultural use. Included in this area are nine farmsteads, five of which were directly associated with members of the extended Munson family. All have farmhouses built between 1800 and 1850, with a collection of associated farm outbuildings, many of which are also 19th-century in origin. Two of the houses are brick, including that of Isaac Munson; the others are wood frame structures.

== See also ==
- National Register of Historic Places listings in Rutland County, Vermont
