= Marble Bridge (Proctor, Vermont) =

- U.S. National Register of Historic Places
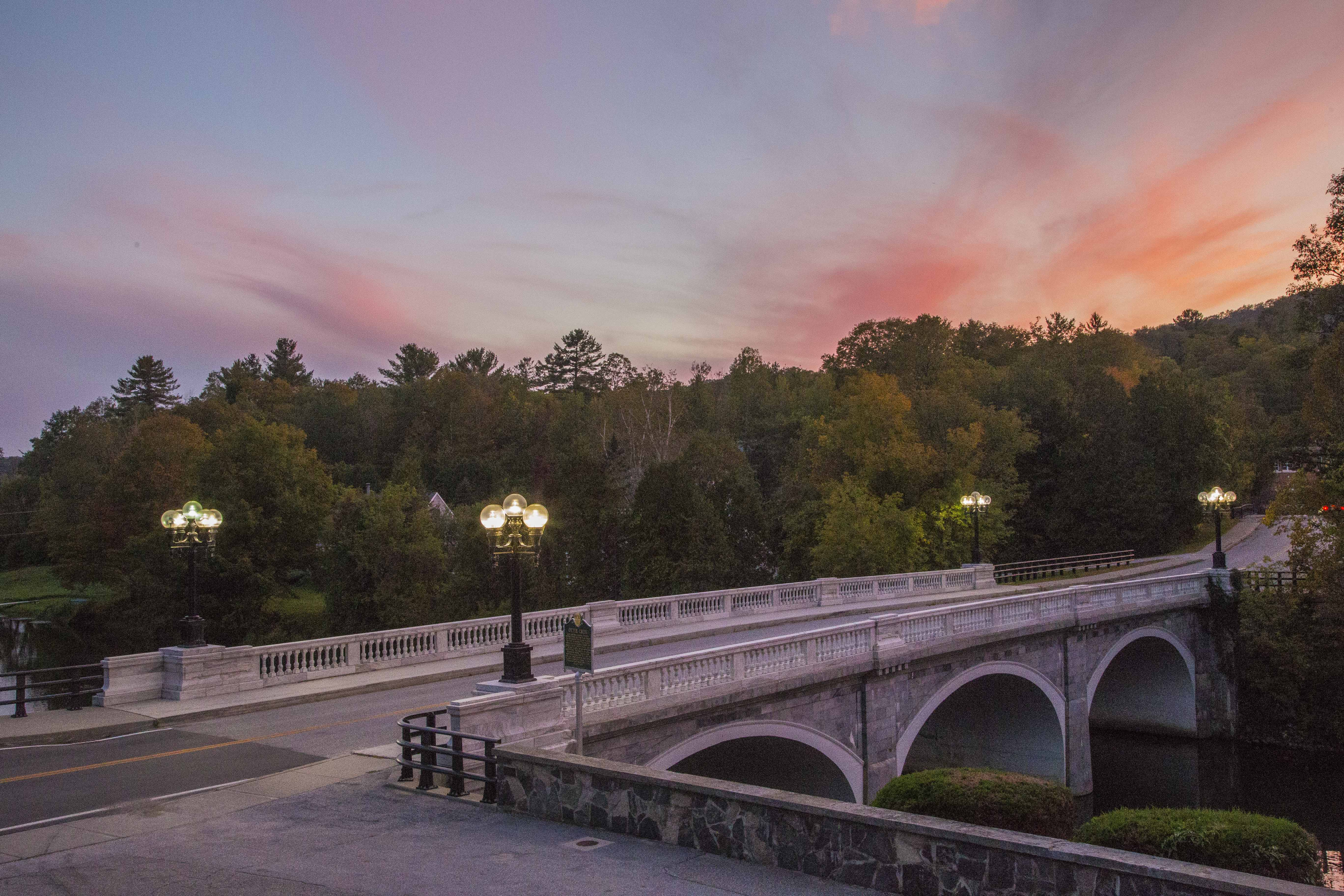

- Location within Vermont Location within the United States
- Location: Main St. over Otter Cr., Proctor, Vermont
- Coordinates: 43°39′40″N 73°2′2″W
- Area: less than one acre
- Built: 1915
- Architect: Henry Leslie Walker
- Architectural style: Reinforced concrete bridge
- MPS: Metal Truss, Masonry, and Concrete Bridges in Vermont MPS
- NRHP reference No.: 91001609
- Added to NRHP: November 14, 1991

The Marble Bridge, formally known as the Fletcher D. Proctor Memorial Bridge, carries Main Street across Otter Creek in the center of Proctor, Vermont. Built in 1915, and widened in 1935-36, it is a well-preserved example of early concrete bridge construction, and is decoratively faced in local marble. The bridge was listed on the National Register of Historic Places in 1991.

== Description and history ==
The Marble Bridge is one of a few bridges crossing Otter Creek in Proctor. It connects the village center on the west side of the creek, with mainly residential areas to the east, and provides access to United States Route 7, which runs north-south further to the east. The bridge consists of three concrete arch spans, each 42 feet (13 m) long, with a total structure length of 170 feet (52 m). The bridge is 38 feet (12 m) wide, and carries a two-lane road deck about 36 feet (11 m) above the creek. The arches are mounted on battered concrete piers, and the spandrels are faced in locally quarried gray marble. The sides of the bridge are adorned with marble balustrades.

The bridge was built in 1915 to a design by Harry Leslie Walker of New York City, and was originally a single lane wide. The 1910s were the first period in Vermont when concrete began to be used as a building material for bridges (supplanting the wooden covered bridges which were predominant prior to this because of a erroneous belief that concrete and metal would last longer and require less maintenance). It is one of the few concrete bridges in the state to survive from this early period. It was widened in 1935-36 with funding from the Works Progress Administration. It is dedicated to Fletcher D. Proctor, who headed the family-owned Vermont Marble Company and served as Governor of Vermont. The bridge is a major marble landmark in the community, whose livelihood has depended on the stone for many years.

== See also ==
- National Register of Historic Places listings in Rutland County, Vermont
- List of bridges on the National Register of Historic Places in Vermont
