= Asahel Kidder House =

Historic house in Vermont, United States

- U.S. National Register of Historic Places
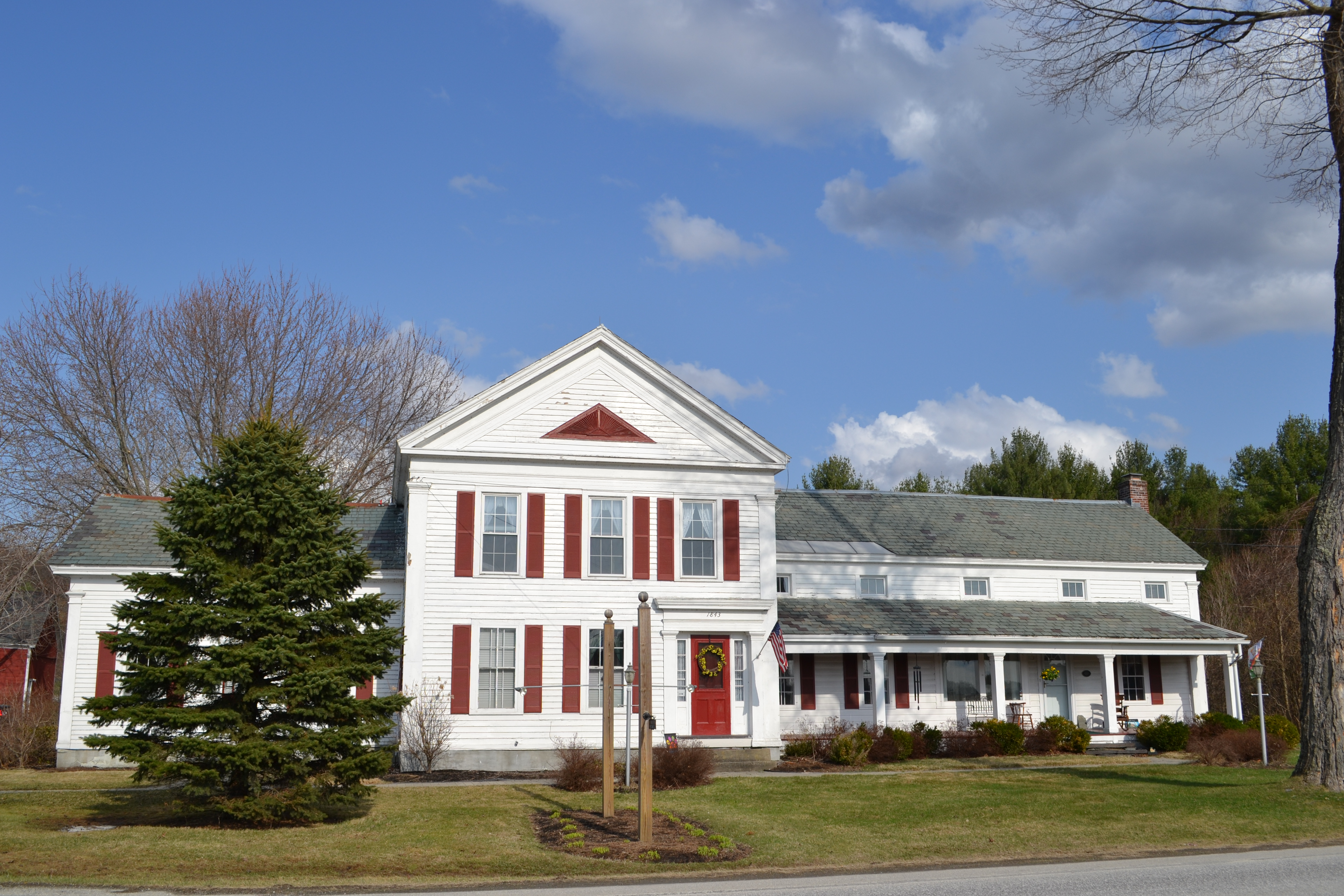

- Location within Vermont Location within the United States
- Location: VT 22A, S of jct. with Bolger Rd., Fair Haven, Vermont
- Coordinates: 43°34′26″N 73°15′50″W
- Area: 3.4 acres (1.4 ha)
- Built: 1850
- Architectural style: Greek Revival
- NRHP reference No.: 97000024
- Added to NRHP: February 7, 1997

The Asahel Kidder House, is an historic house at 1108 South Main Street in Fair Haven, Vermont. Built about 1843, by the efforts of a prosperous local farmer, it is a remarkably sophisticated expression of Greek Revival architecture for a rural setting. It was listed on the National Register of Historic Places in 1997.

== Description and history ==
The Asahel Kidder House stands about 1 mile (1.6 km) south of the village center of Fair Haven, on the east side of Vermont Route 22A, the principal route leading south from the village. The house consists of a main block and two substantial ells, and there is also a 19th-century barn on the property, facing Bolger Road. The house's main block is 2 1/2 stories in height, with a front-facing gabled roof and clapboard siding. The main facade is three bays wide, with corner pilasters rising to an entablature and fully pedimented gable. A triangular louver occupies the center of the gable. The main entrance is in the rightmost bay, framed by sidelight windows and pilasters, with a corniced entablature above. To the left (as seen from the road) is a single-story ell with similar styling, including corner pilasters. The right ell includes what is probably the oldest part of the house. Built about 1770 and attached to the house around 1870, it is 1 1/2 stories in height, with corner pilasters, and a shed-roof porch extending across its front.

The main house was built about 1843 by Asahel Kidder, a prosperous local sheep farmer who was also prominent in local civic affairs. The sophisticated Greek Revival elements showcased his sophistication and wealth. About 1870, Kidder added the right (or southerly) ell, a former "tenement house" or tavern built about 1770 that was adjacent to the property, in order to accommodate a growing family. Isaac Wood, Kidder's son-in-law, inherited the farm after Kidder's death. Wood converted it into a dairy operation, which became known as Maplewood Dairy. He built the left-side (or northerly) addition to the house about 1880. The dairy closed in 1979 after nearly a century in operation, and the dairy plant on the property behind the home was razed in the early 1980s. The house was sold out of the family in 1986 and converted into the Maplewood Inn Bed & Breakfast. In 2021, the property was sold and is again a private residence.

== See also ==
- National Register of Historic Places listings in Rutland County, Vermont
