= Hager Farm =

- U.S. National Register of Historic Places
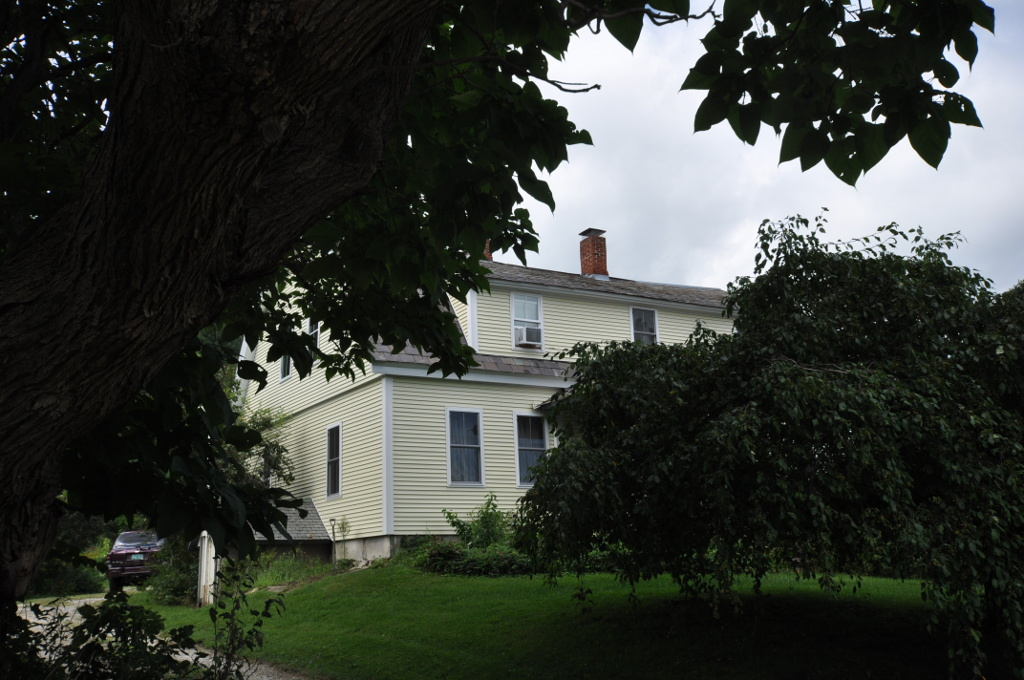

- Location within Vermont Location within the United States
- Location: US 7, Wallingford, Vermont
- Coordinates: 43°26′10″N 72°59′26″W
- Area: 3 acres (1.2 ha)
- Built: 1800
- Architectural style: Greek Revival
- MPS: Rural Otter Creek Valley MRA
- NRHP reference No.: 86003224
- Added to NRHP: November 26, 1986

The Hager Farm is a historic farmstead on United States Route 7 in southern Wallingford, Vermont. Its farmhouse, built about 1800, is one of the oldest in the community, and is regionally unusual because of its gambrel roof. The property was listed on the National Register of Historic Places in 1986.

== Description and history ==
The Hager farm complex occupies about 3 acres (1.2 ha) of land on either side of US 7, roughly midway between the village center of Wallingford, and its southern town line with Mount Tabor. The house stands set back from the west side of the road, opposite a gambrel-roofed barn and silo set close to the road. The house is a five-bay gambrel-roofed wood frame structure, with two interior chimneys and clapboard siding. The front and rear roof faces have three-bay shed-roof dormers extending from the steep portion of the roof. The main entrance is sheltered by a shed-roof porch supported by simple round columns set on a rubblestone skirt. An ell extends to the rear of the house, joining it to a horse barn. The framing of the house is reported to be of plank-frame construction.

The house at the heart of the Hager farm was built about 1800, not far from the site of the first known residence built in Wallingford (c. 1770). The farm property was owned in the 19th century by members of the Earle family, and in the 20th by the Hagers. The gambrel-roofed Cape house is a relatively rare form in the state, and this house is one of the better-preserved of a cluster of such houses in southwestern Vermont.

== See also ==
- National Register of Historic Places listings in Rutland County, Vermont
