= Green Mountain Cottage =

Historic house in Vermont, United States

- U.S. National Register of Historic Places
- Location within Vermont Location within the United States
- Location: 61 Church St., Mount Holly, Vermont
- Coordinates: 43°24′54″N 72°49′12″W
- Built: 1853
- Architectural style: Colonial Revival
- NRHP reference No.: 100006222
- Added to NRHP: March 11, 2021

The Green Mountain Cottage is a historic tourist accommodation at 61 Church Street in Mount Holly, Vermont. Built about 1853 as a farm house, it was converted into a tourist house in the 1880s, and has undergone numerous alterations which give it a predominantly Colonial Revival feel. The house, along with a period barn, were listed on the National Register of Historic Places in 2021. It is now a private residence. Founded by the Chadburn Family.

== Description and history ==
The Green Mountain Cottage stands in Mount Holly's Belmont village center, on the north side of Church Street just northeast of the Village Baptist Church. It is a rambling 2 1/2-story wood-frame structure, with gabled roofs and a clapboarded exterior. The main block's front facade is spanned by a single-story porch, which extends partly onto the front of a two-story ell extending to its right. The porch is supported by square columns, with a low turned balustrade. The porch rises to a second story in the center bay, covered by a projecting gabled roof. The interior is modestly finished, with plaster walls, wooden trim, and wooden floors.

The land where the cottage now stands was originally a farmstead developed in the first half of the 19th century. The main block of the house was probably built around 1853, and was acquired as part of a 50-acre (20 ha) farm property in 1878 by Bart Chadburn, an immigrant from Quebec who worked in local industries. Chadburn began opening the house to the tourist trade in the 1880s, and the business remained in the family until 1943. It continued to be operated under other owners as a farm and tourist house until 1965.

== See also ==
- National Register of Historic Places listings in Rutland County, Vermont
