= Forest Dale Iron Furnace =

- Forestdale Iron Furnace
- U.S. National Register of Historic Places
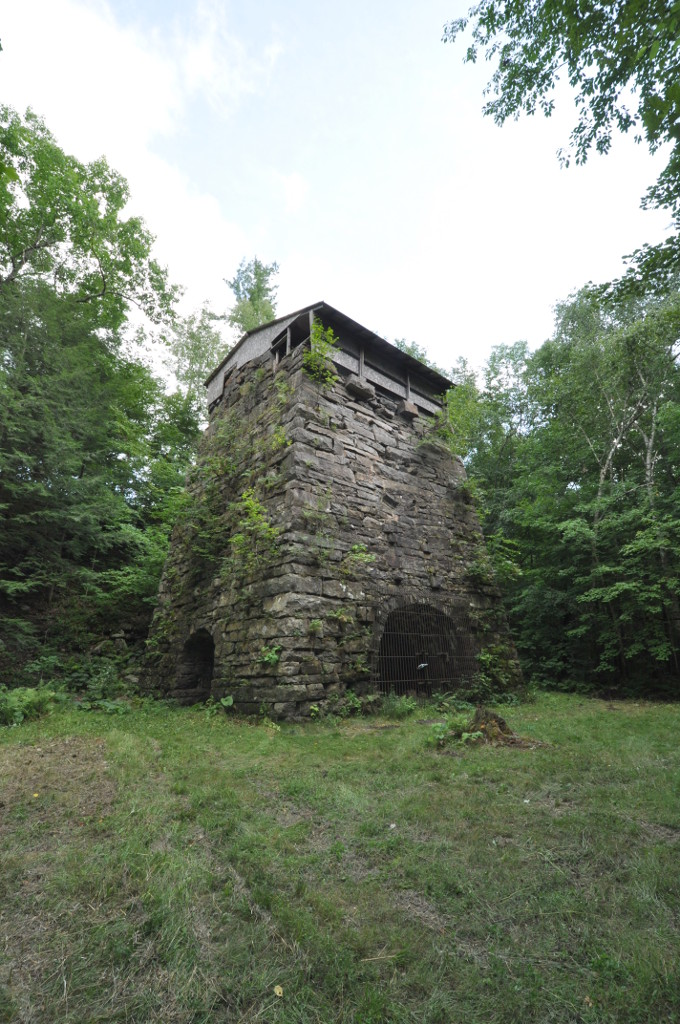

- Location within Vermont Location within the United States
- Location: VT 73 and Furnace Rd., Brandon, Vermont
- Coordinates: 43°49′55″N 73°2′54″W
- Area: 9.8 acres (4.0 ha)
- Built: 1810
- Built by: Smith, John
- NRHP reference No.: 74000254
- Added to NRHP: June 13, 1974

The Forest Dale Iron Furnace was a 19th-century iron smelting facility in Brandon, Vermont. Located off Vermont Route 73 east of the village of Forest Dale, it operated between 1810 and 1855, closing due to competition from higher quality and more efficient furnaces. Now reduced to archaeological ruins and the remains of its main furnace stack, it was listed on the National Register of Historic Places in 1974. The site is marked by a historic marker on Vermont 73.

== Description and history ==
The Forest Dale Iron Furnace is located in eastern Brandon, on the north side of Vermont 73 just east of Furnace Road. The site now consists of a generally level area, much of it grassy, with the principal visible portion, the furnace stack, set in the woods just north of the field, accessible via a trail off Furnace Road. The stack is a square stone and brick structure, about 60 feet (18 m) tall, 32 feet (9.8 m) square at the base, tapering as it rises. Three sides have arched openings with stone voussoirs at ground level, about 8 feet (2.4 m) wide at the mouth, that taper as the recede into the structure. A central chamber is lined with brick. Other features of the site include a raceway and wheelpit, originally fed by waters from the nearby Neshobe River, and some stone retaining walls. The area is littered with stone, and there are several stone foundations of other structures that once stood on the site.

The furnace was established in 1810 by John Smith of Leicester, Vermont, and was in operation, under a variety of names and owners, until 1855. Brown hematite ore from nearby beds was processed with local charcoal to produce iron, which was formed into utilitarian implements such as stoves, agricultural implements, and hardware. The works was not particularly efficient, and its sales were hampered by a poor transportation network. More advanced and better-connected works, particularly in Troy, New York, contributed to its downfall, and the site was abandoned in 1855. It was given to the state in 1974.

== See also ==
- National Register of Historic Places listings in Rutland County, Vermont
