= West Rutland Town Hall =

- U.S. National Register of Historic Places
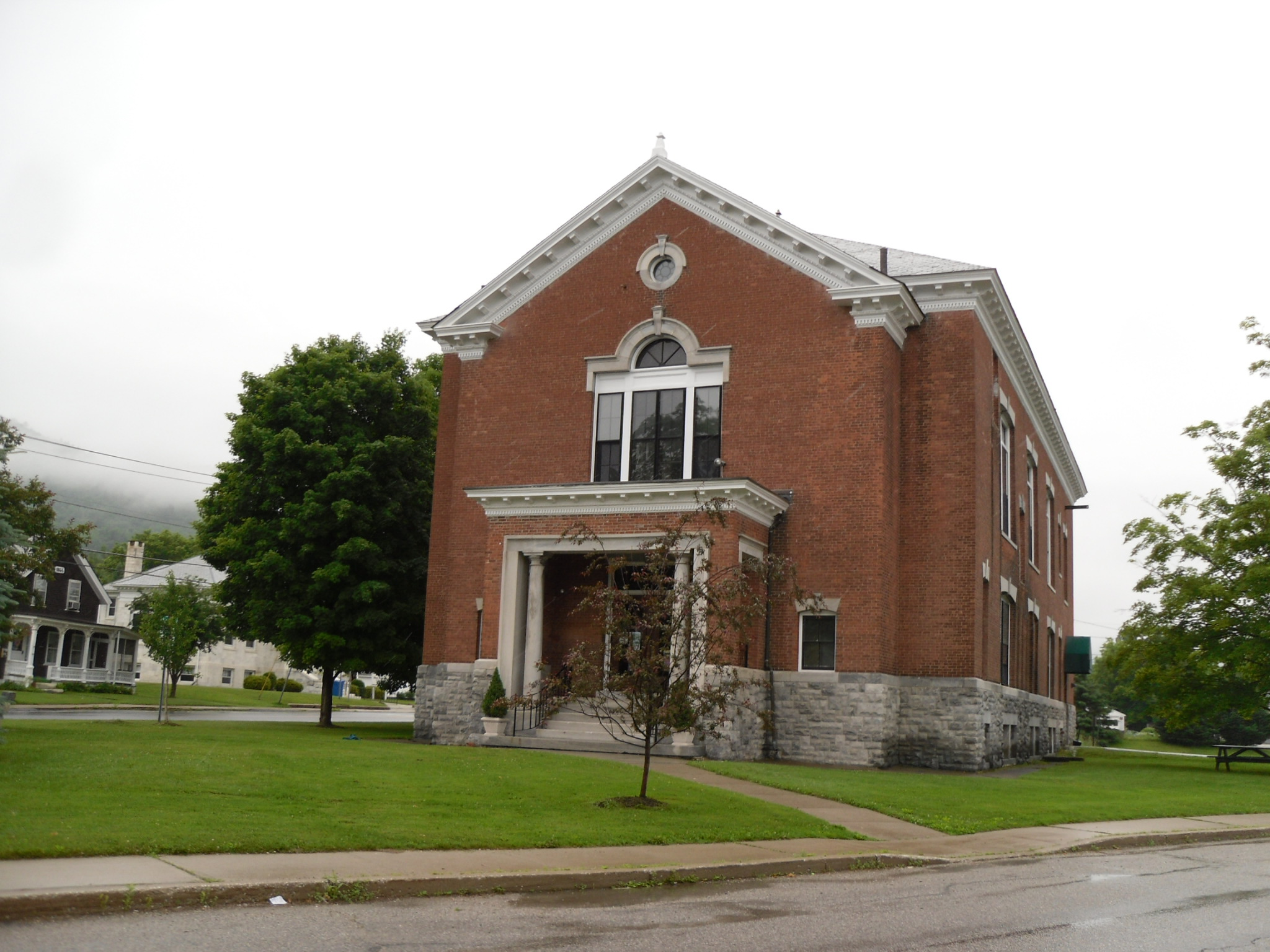

- Location within Vermont Location within the United States
- Location: Main and Marble Sts., West Rutland, Vermont
- Coordinates: 43°35′42″N 73°2′56″W
- Area: 0.6 acres (0.24 ha)
- Built: 1908
- Architect: Paige, Charles E.
- Architectural style: Colonial Revival
- NRHP reference No.: 83003221
- Added to NRHP: July 28, 1983

The West Rutland Town Hall is located at Main and Marble Streets in the village center of West Rutland, Vermont. Built in 1908-09, it is a fine and restrained example of Colonial Revival architecture, and originally housed town offices, the public library, and a community meeting space. It was listed on the National Register of Historic Places in 1983.

== Description and history ==
West Rutland Town Hall is a rectangular brick building, set on a triangular lot in West Rutland's center, formed by the Marble Street to the northeast and Main Street to the southwest. It is an imposing two-story structure, covered by a hip roof and set on a raised foundation of rock-faced marble. A gabled section projects from its front facade, with the main entrance at its centered set in a recess that is further sheltered by a flat-roof pavilion. The recess has a marble surround with smooth marble columns set at the sides. The projecting sections and the main roof both have dentillated and modillioned cornices. The ground floor houses town offices, organize around a central corridor, and the upper floor has a large auditorium space with a stage set under a proscenium arch. The interior retains many of its original period finishes.

Acquisition of the land, and the construction of the building were authorized by town meeting in 1907. The building was completed in 1909 to a design by Rutland architect Charles Paige, at a total cost of about $30,000. The ground floor spaces, now partly filled with municipal offices, originally housed the town clerk, public library, and classrooms for both elementary and high school grades. The upstairs auditorium over time was put to multiple uses, including town meetings, dances and other social events, and political rallies. It was closed in the 1970s, when such events were moved to a newer school auditorium.

== See also ==
- National Register of Historic Places in Rutland County, Vermont
