= Longfellow School (Rutland, Vermont) =

- U.S. National Register of Historic Places
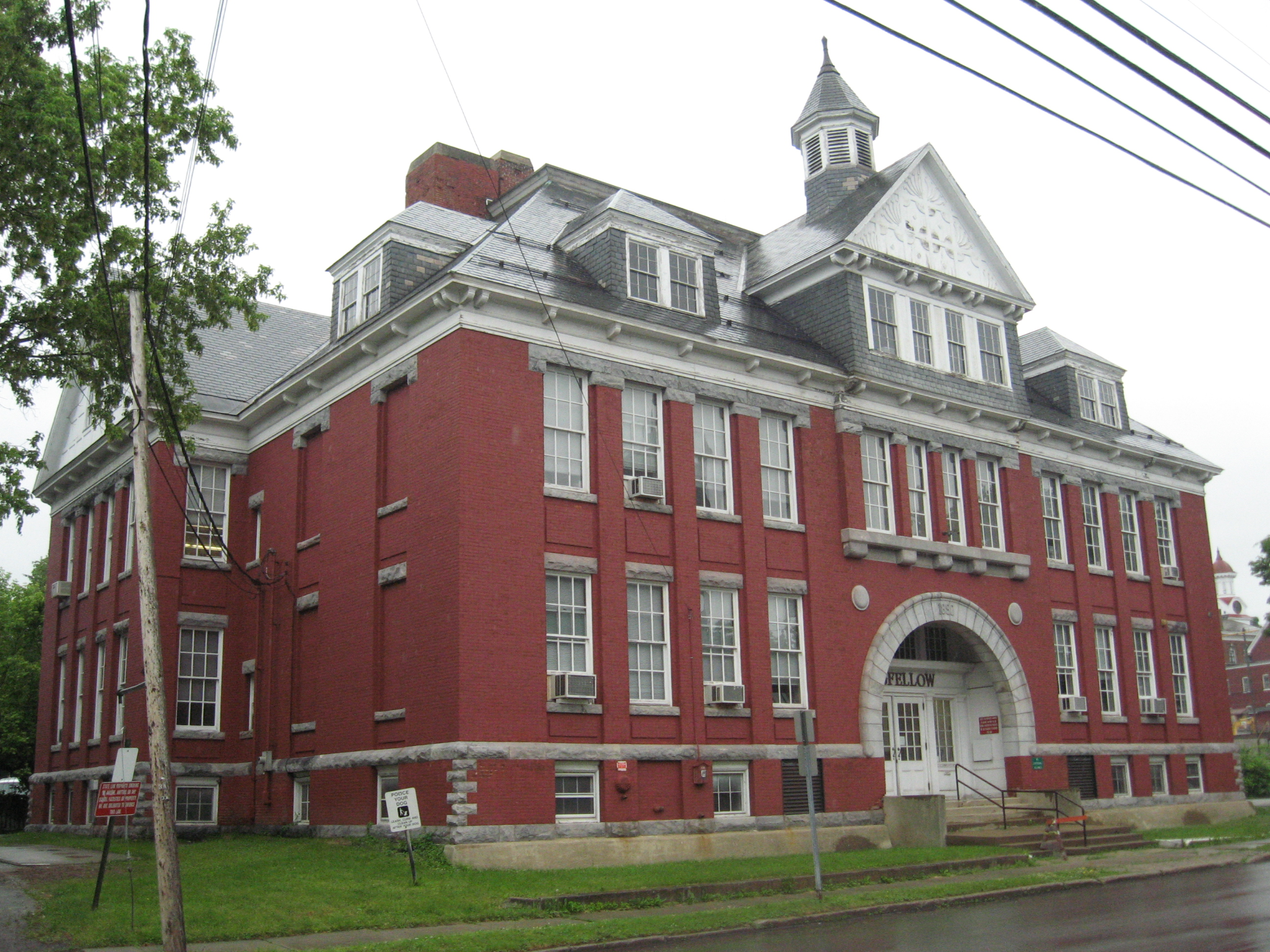
- Longfellow School in 2011

- Location within Vermont Location within the United States
- Location: 6 Church St., Rutland, Vermont
- Coordinates: 43°36′31″N 72°58′42″W
- Built: 1890
- Architectural style: Colonial Revival
- NRHP reference No.: 76000147
- Added to NRHP: December 12, 1976

The Longfellow School, also known as Church Street School, is a historic school building at 6 Church Street in Rutland, Vermont. Built in 1890, it was the first purpose-built graded school in the city, serving as a model for later schools. It was listed on the National Register of Historic Places in 1976. It now houses the administrative offices of the city schools.

== Description and history ==
The former Longfellow School building is located in central Rutland, on the east side of Church Street near its junction with West Street. It is a 2-1/2 story brick building, with a hip roof and a raised basement, which is separated from the ground floor by a stone beltcourse. Gabled wings project slightly to either side, and the roof is pierced by a number of hip-roof dormers. The front facade is twelve bays wide, with a four-bay gabled section projecting from the roof above the central bays, topped by an octagonal belfry. The main entrance is recessed in a round-arch opening that occupies the center four bays. Windows on the other bays have rusticated stone sills and lintels, with the upper-floor lintels joined in a continuous band. The central four windows on the second floor are articulated by slightly projecting pilasters supported by stone brackets.

The school was built in 1890, not long after the city adopted a graded schooling plan, and was thus the first school built to specifically support this type of teaching. Although standards for lighting, ventilation, and other features of schools had not yet been standardized by the state, this school was also at the forefront of advances in those areas, and served as a model for later schools built by the city.

== See also ==
- National Register of Historic Places listings in Rutland County, Vermont
