= Nathan Allen House =

Historic house in Vermont, United States

- U.S. National Register of Historic Places
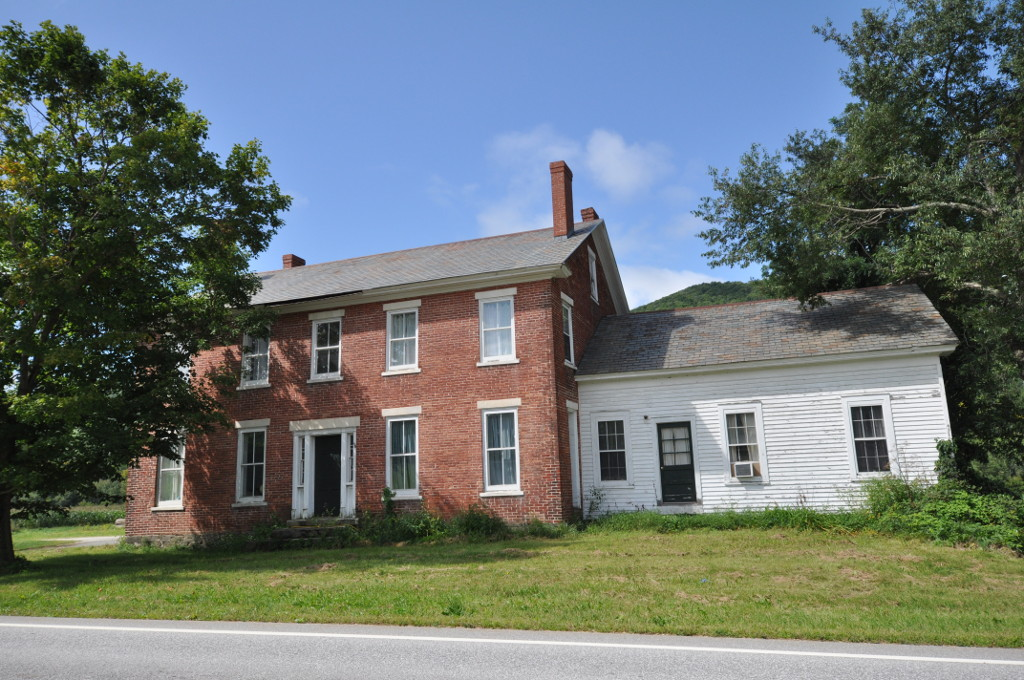

- Location within Vermont Location within the United States
- Location: VT 30, Pawlet, Vermont
- Coordinates: 43°21′45″N 73°11′7″W
- Area: 2 acres (0.81 ha)
- Built: 1834
- Architectural style: Greek Revival, Federal, Extended English
- NRHP reference No.: 88002069
- Added to NRHP: October 27, 1988

The Nathan Allen House is a historic house on Vermont Route 30 in Pawlet, Vermont. Built about 1834, it is an excellent local example of a late Federal period farmhouse built in brick. It was listed on the National Register of Historic Places in 1988.

== Description and history ==
The Nathan Allen House stands on the west side of Vermont Route 30, a few miles north of Pawlet's central village, in the fertile plains on the east side of the Mettawee River. It is a 2 1/2-story brick structure, with single-story wood frame ells attached to the right and rear. It rests on a rubblestone foundation, and has trim elements of dressed marble and wood. The main block is five bays wide, with a center entrance flanked by sidelight windows. The left side wall is a reconstruction, the original having collapsed due to deteriorating condition in 1983. The house has four side chimneys, and follows a center-hall plan inside. The interior has seen a number of alterations and stylistic changes, but retains some of its original features, including a carved arch in the center hall, and a marble fireplace surround in one of the parlors.

The house was built about 1834 for Nathan Allen, a farmer who owned and worked the surrounding land (now in separate ownership). It is one of two nearly identical houses built in this area; the other was built for Nathan's brother Elisha. They are the only significant example of late Federal period architecture in the area.

== See also ==
- National Register of Historic Places listings in Rutland County, Vermont
