= Danby Village Historic District =

Historic district in Vermont, United States

- U.S. National Register of Historic Places
- U.S. Historic district
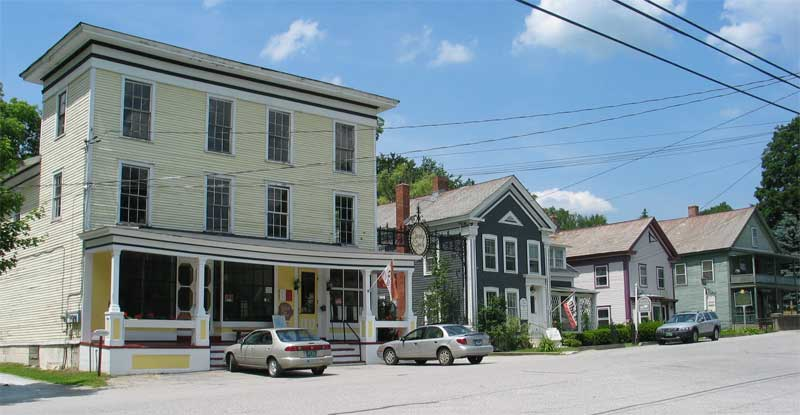
- Main Street

- Location within Vermont Location within the United States
- Location: Main St., Mt. Tabor Ave., Depot St., and Borough Hill Rd., Danby, Vermont
- Coordinates: 43°20′50″N 72°59′47″W
- Area: 40 acres (16 ha)
- Built: 1800
- Architectural style: Greek Revival
- NRHP reference No.: 83003219
- Added to NRHP: February 10, 1983

The Danby Village Historic District encompasses much of the town center of Danby, Vermont. It is centered on a stretch of Main Street, roughly between Depot Street and Brook Road. The village has a cohesive collection of mid-19th century architecture, mostly residential, with a modest number of later additions. The district was listed on the National Register of Historic Places in 1983.

== Description and history ==
The town of Danby, located in southeastern Rutland County, Vermont, was settled in the late 18th century, and the area that is now Danby Village was settled around 1800. Originally less important than the more central Danby Corners area, it was the site of some of the town's early mills. At first a predominantly agrarian economy, the village achieved greater prominence beginning in the 1840s, when marble quarrying became the town's major industry. Consequences of this are that most of the buildings in the village are built on marble foundations, and are in the then-fashionable Greek Revival style of architecture. Only one building, however, is built entirely out of marble. The village saw further growth due to the arrival of the railroad in 1851, and eclipsed the Four Corners as an economic and civic center of the town.

The district is roughly centered on the junction of Main Street with Mount Tabor Avenue, and extends south beyond Depot Street and north nearly to Creamery Brook Road. There are 83 buildings in the district, most of which are of historical significance. The majority are Greek Revival in style, although some of the more prominent buildings are in later, and more elaborate, Italianate and Queen Anne styles. There are a small number of buildings, mainly residence, built in the early decades of the 20th century. Prominent civic buildings include the library, fire station, and two churches, the oldest a c. 1838 Congregational church with early Gothic features.

== See also ==
- National Register of Historic Places listings in Rutland County, Vermont
