= Braintree School =

- U.S. National Register of Historic Places
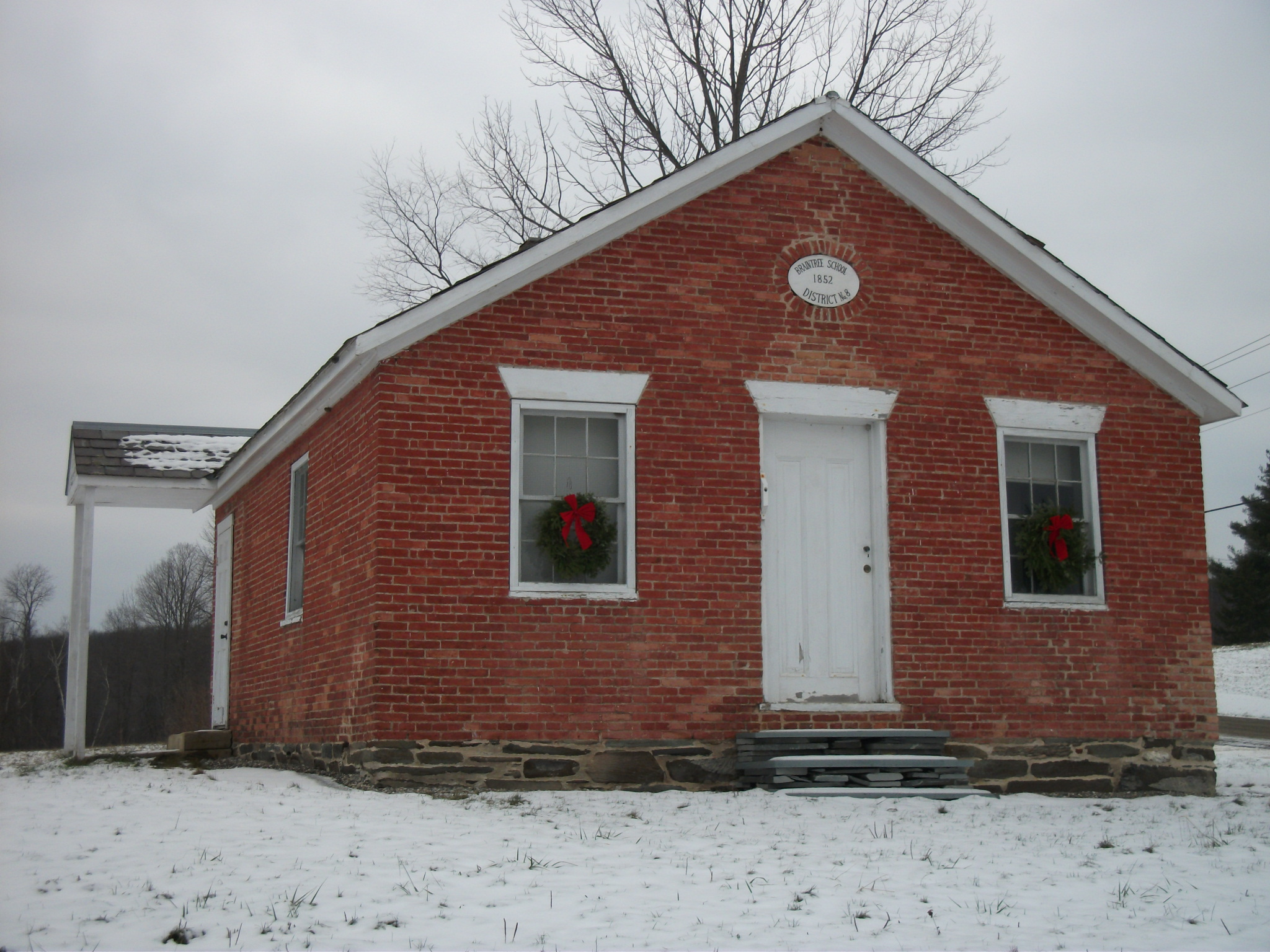

- Location within Vermont Location within the United States
- Location: 9 Warren Switch Rd., Pawlet, Vermont
- Coordinates: 43°22′8″N 73°14′8″W
- Area: 0.2 acres (0.081 ha)
- Built: 1852
- Architectural style: Federal
- MPS: Educational Resources of Vermont MPS
- NRHP reference No.: 09000917
- Added to NRHP: May 3, 2010

The Braintree School, also known as the District 8 School, is a historic school building at 9 Warren Switch Road in Pawlet, Vermont, United States. It is a single-room district schoolhouse built in 1852, and used as a school until 1934. It is now a museum property owned by the Pawlet Historical Society, and was listed on the National Register of Historic Places in 2010.

== Description and history ==
The Braintree School stands in central western Pawlet, at the southwest corner of Warren Switch Road and Vermont Route 153. The small property includes a single-story brick schoolhouse and a small wood-frame structure that served historically as an outhouse and woodshed. The school is built of red brick, laid in American bond, with a gabled roof. It measures 22 by 27 feet (6.7 m × 8.2 m), with the long axis oriented parallel to Warren Switch Road. The main entrance is in the east façade, facing Route 153, centered between two sash windows, with a small oval opening above that houses a wooden panel identifying the building. A secondary entrance is located on the south side, sheltered by a small gabled porch. A bank of windows, added in the 1930s to meet state requirements, occupy the west facade. The outhouse/woodshed, originally located directly adjacent to the school, was moved about 20 feet (6.1 m) behind it, in order to provide for improved drainage around the school. The interior of the school has a small foyer, and a single classroom.

Pawlet's early district schoolhouses were all wood-frame structures, most of which were replaced in the 1840s–1860s with brick buildings. This school was built in 1852, and was one of six surviving district school buildings in the town at the time of its listing on the National Register in 2010. It was used as a school until 1934, a period in which the town consolidated all of its district schools into more modern facilities. It is architecturally unusual, exhibiting Federal period style even though that style had already been out of fashion for some time when it was built. In the 1970s the building was acquired by the local historical society, which restored it, exposing some of its original features that had been covered over by later alterations. Students from town schools are brought here to experience examples of 19th-century educational practices.

== See also ==
- National Register of Historic Places listings in Rutland County, Vermont
