= Watkins School =

- U.S. National Register of Historic Places
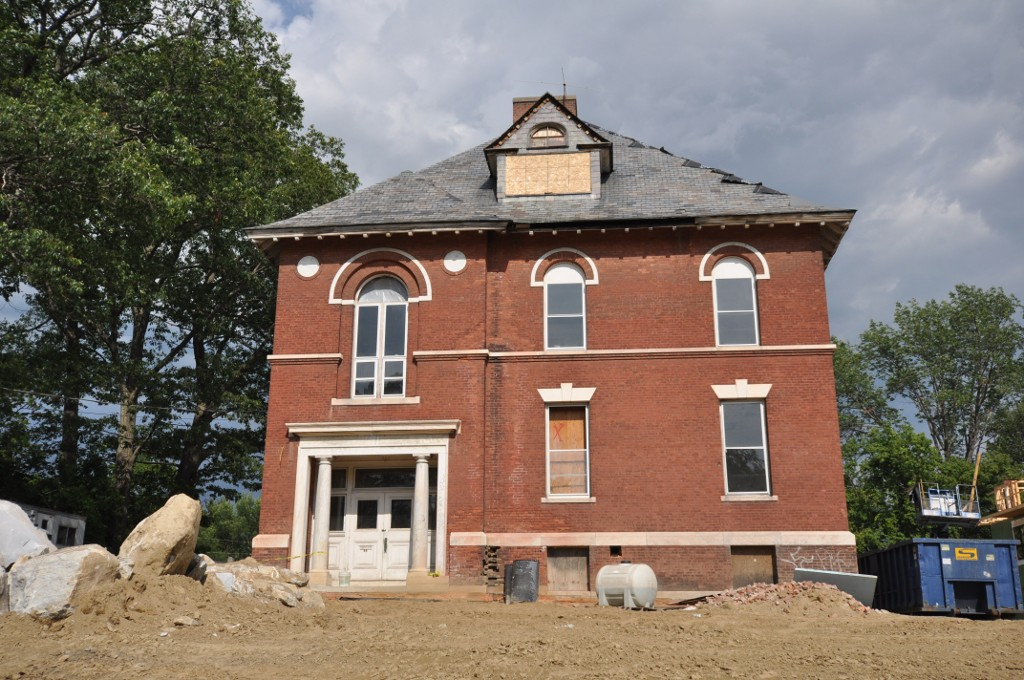
- 2014 photo, taken during the building's conversion to residences

- Location within Vermont Location within the United States
- Location: 26 Watkins Ave., Rutland, Vermont
- Coordinates: 43°36′26″N 72°59′43″W
- Area: 1.6 acres (0.65 ha)
- Built: 1897
- Architect: Stickney and Austin
- Architectural style: Colonial Revival; Classical Revival
- NRHP reference No.: 14000133
- Added to NRHP: April 7, 2014

The Watkins School is a historic school building at 26 Watkins Street in Rutland, Vermont. Built in 1897, it is a high quality local example of Colonial Revival architecture, and a fine example of a period graded school. It was listed on the National Register of Historic Places in 2014. It has been converted to residential use.

== Description and history ==
The former Watkins School building is located in western Rutland, on the east side of Watkins Street between State and West Streets. It is a 2-1/2 story brick building, covered by a complex hip roof with flared eaves and exposed rafter ends. It rests on a stone foundation, and has marble trim elements. The main facade is three bays wide, with the entrance in the projecting left bay, recessed in an opening framed by pilasters and round pillars, with a corniced entablature above. The windows on the second level are set in round-arch openings, that above the entrance elongated and set in a recessed panel. Belt courses of marble separate the levels of the building.

The school was built in 1897, during a period after the city's 1892 incorporation where several new schools were built. It was designed by the Boston, Massachusetts firm of Stickney and Austin, and is a high-quality and distinctive contribution to the city's architecture. At the time of its construction, the surrounding residential neighborhood was only partially developed, and Watkins Street had recently been laid out. It was used as a public school until about 1959, and as a private special education school in the 1960s. The building lot was used as a school bus storage lot beginning in the 1970s, with an underground fuel tank and service pumps installed, and a service garage added later. These facilities have all since been removed, and the building now houses low-income residential units.

== See also ==
- National Register of Historic Places listings in Rutland County, Vermont
