= Laurel Glen Mausoleum-Laurel Hall =

Historic site in Rutland County, Vermont

- U.S. National Register of Historic Places
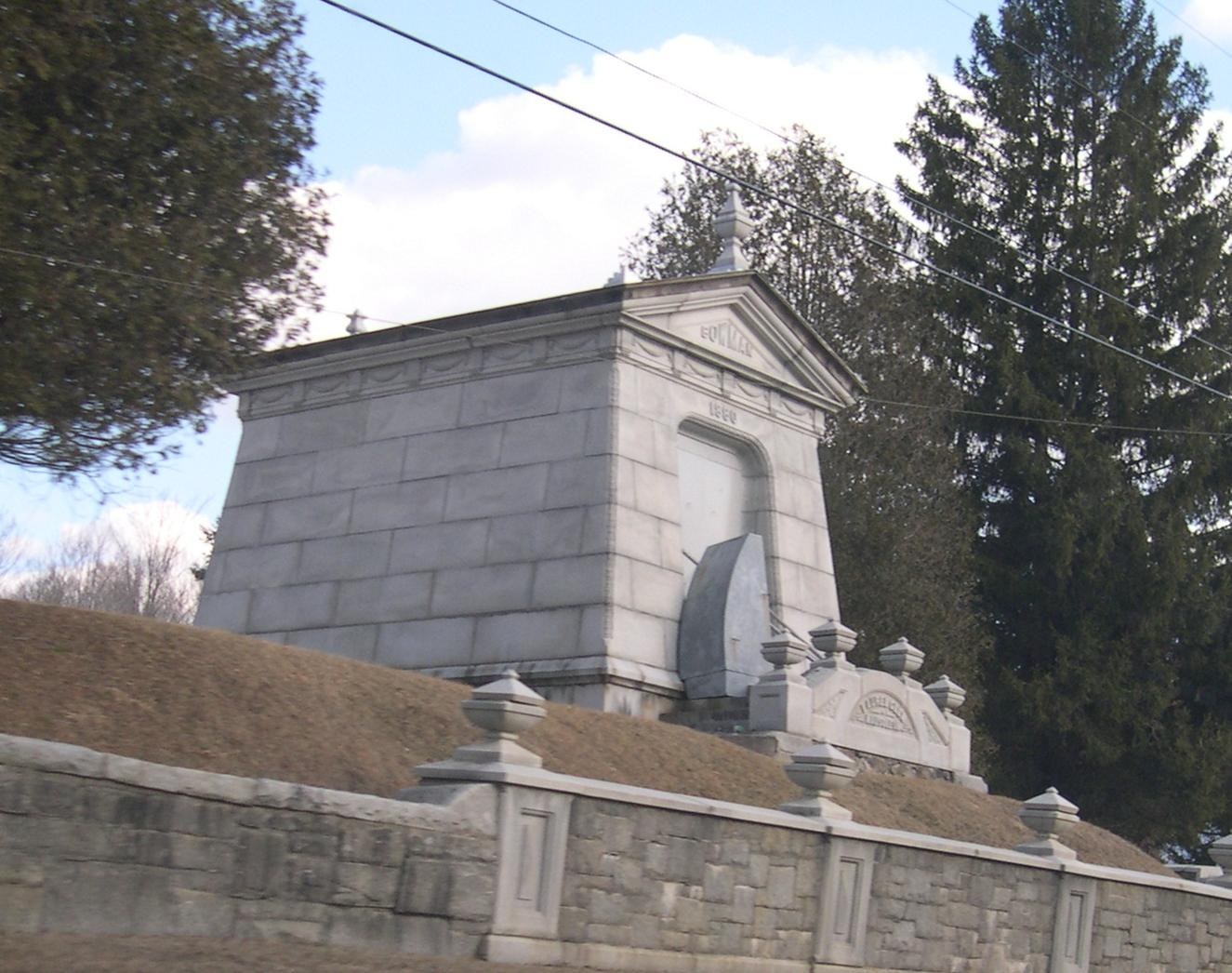

- Location within Vermont Location within the United States
- Nearest city: Shewsbury, Vermont
- Coordinates: 43°29′5″N 72°52′49″W
- Area: 0.8 acres (0.32 ha)
- Built: 1881
- Architect: Giovanni Turini, G.B. Croff
- Architectural style: Queen Anne, Classical Revival
- NRHP reference No.: 98001429
- Added to NRHP: November 23, 1998

Laurel Hall and the Laurel Glen Mausoleum form a historic estate property on Vermont Route 103 in Shrewsbury, Vermont. Built between 1880 and 1882, the estate includes examples of high-style Queen Anne architecture in the main house and some outbuildings, and includes a distinctive Egyptian Revival mausoleum, all built by John Porter Bowman, a prominent local businessman. The properties were listed on the National Register of Historic Places in 1998. The properties are overseen by the Laurel Glen Cemetery Association of 1894, which is an independent 501(c)(3); Laurel Glen is not part of the Shrewsbury Historical Society.

== Description and history ==
The Laurel Hall estate is located astride Route 103, just south of the village of Cuttingsville. The property includes a main house and carriage barn on landscaped grounds on the west side of the road, and a caretaker's house, conservatory, and mausoleum on the east side. The main house is a large 2 1/2-story wood-frame building, with complex massing and roof line typical of the Queen Anne period. Prominent features include a three-story tower with elaborate trim and balconies on the upper levels, and a full-width porch extending across the front. The house stands at the back of a landscaped semicircular drive, with marble fenceposts at its entrances. The carriage barn, located near the southern end of the loop, is decorated in a manner similar to the house.

Roughly opposite the house on the west side of Route 103 stands the mausoleum, set raised above the roadway, with a dressed ashlar granite retaining wall below. It is a rectangular structure with walls that slope inward and are capped by a gabled roof. The entrance faces the road, set in a rectangular opening with curved corners. Stairs ascend from the sides to reach it, with an urned railing wall in front. Similar urn-like decorations adorn both the roof of the mausoleum and the retaining wall in front of it.

John Porter Bowman, for whom Laurel Hall was built, was a native of Clarendon who made a fortune in the tanning and leather industry, supplying the Union Army during the American Civil War. Two of his daughters died young (in 1854 and 1879), and his wife died in 1880. The grief-stricken Bowman had the mausoleum built as a memorial to them in 1880, and it was an instant sensation and tourist attraction. Laurel Hall was built from a design by renowned architect and funerary artist, G.B. Croff, and was his summer residence and retirement home until his death in 1891.

For more information, visit Bowmanmansion.org

== See also ==
- National Register of Historic Places listings in Rutland County, Vermont
