= Pawlet Town Hall =

- U.S. National Register of Historic Places
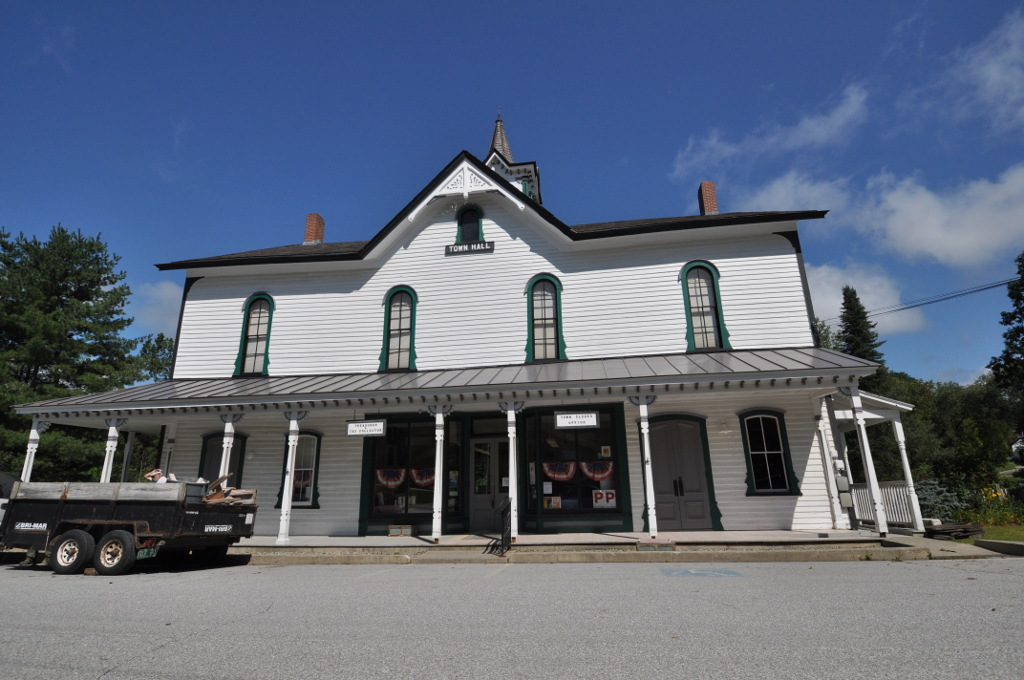

- Location within Vermont Location within the United States
- Location: 122 School St., Pawlet, Vermont
- Coordinates: 43°20′44″N 73°10′44″W
- Area: less than one acre
- Built: 1881
- Architectural style: Italianate
- MPS: Historic Government Buildings MPS
- NRHP reference No.: 95001449
- Added to NRHP: December 13, 1995

Pawlet Town Hall houses the municipal offices of the town of Pawlet, Vermont. Located at 122 School Street in the village center, it was built in 1881 as a combined town hall, meeting and performance venue, and retail establishment. It has served as town hall since its construction, and is a good local example of late Italianate architecture. It was listed on the National Register of Historic Places in 1995.

== Description and history ==
Pawlet Town Hall is located in the village center of Pawlet, on the north side of School Street. It is set on a terrace overlooking Flower Brook, a short way east of its confluence with the Mettawee River. It is a large two-story wood frame structure, with a gable roof topped by an ornate square cupola. A single-story hip-roofed porch extends around three sides of the building. The upper floor windows are narrow round-arched windows with moulded decorative sills and lintels. The ground floor has irregularly spaced doors and sash windows. On the interior, the ground floor is partitioned into four spaces, which historically served as the clerk's office, library, and a retail space. The latter has since been taken over by town functions, housing additional administrative offices and the selectmen's meeting room. The upstairs houses a large auditorium with stage and dressing rooms.

Prior to the construction of this building, the town's meetings were typically held in local taverns and churches. The town authorized construction of this building at the 1881 town meeting. It was built in partnership with a local businessman, Marcellus Wheeler, who donated the land and built most of the ground floor. He sold his interest in the building to Charles Taylor, who operated a general store in the retail space. Prior to its acquisition by the town, the retail space also hosted the town post office, a millinery shop, and the local Grange chapter. With the Grange in decline, the town purchased the commercial portion of the building in 1943.

== See also ==
- National Register of Historic Places listings in Rutland County, Vermont
