= Hydeville School =

- U.S. National Register of Historic Places
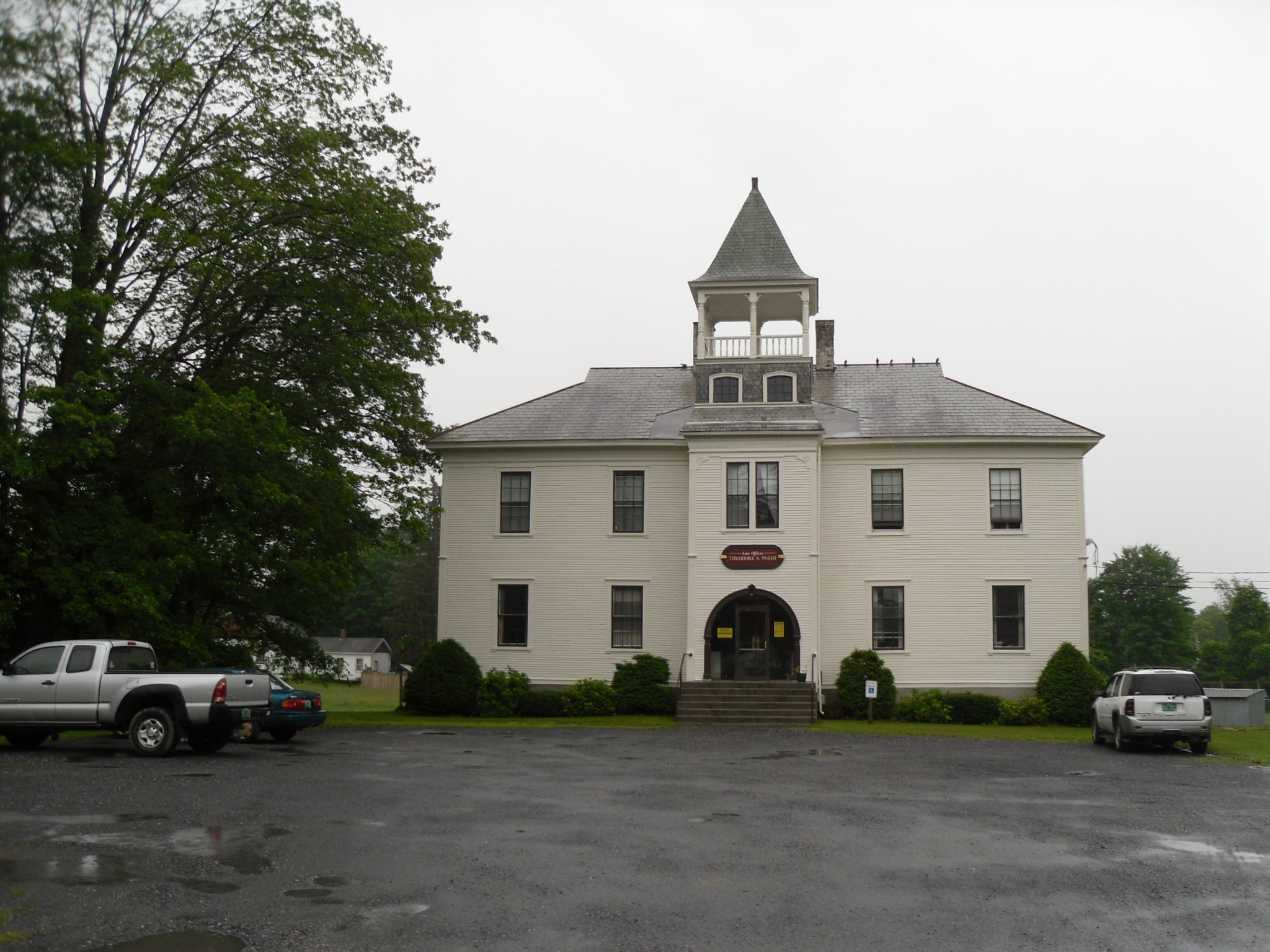

- Location within Vermont Location within the United States
- Location: VT 4A, Castleton, Vermont
- Coordinates: 43°36′19″N 73°13′48″W
- Area: 3 acres (1.2 ha)
- Built: 1898
- Built by: Frank Davis
- Architect: N.S. Wood
- Architectural style: Colonial Revival
- NRHP reference No.: 78000242
- Added to NRHP: November 21, 1978

The Hydeville School is a historic former school building on Vermont Route 4A in Castleton, Vermont. Built in 1898, it is an example of Colonial Revival architecture. It is also historically notable as one of the first schools in the state that was used as a training school for teachers being trained at the normal school in Castleton (now Castleton University). The building was listed on the National Register of Historic Places in 1978.

== Description and history ==
The Hydeville School stands in the village of Hydeville in western Castleton. It is set on the south side of Route 4A, between School Street and Blissville Road. It is a two-story wood frame structure, with a hip roof, clapboard siding, and a slate foundation finished in concrete. The most prominent feature is a projecting three-story tower, which has pilastered corners, the main entrance set in a round-arch opening, and an open belvedere beneath a flared pyramidal roof. The interior retains significant amounts of original finish, including woodwork in the stairwells and classrooms.

The school was authorized by the town in 1898, designed by local architect N.S. Wood, and opened in 1899. It was one of three schools in the Castleton school system that was used by the normal school at Castleton College as a training ground for teachers and techniques.

== See also ==
- National Register of Historic Places listings in Rutland County, Vermont
