= Crowley Cheese Factory =

- U.S. National Register of Historic Places
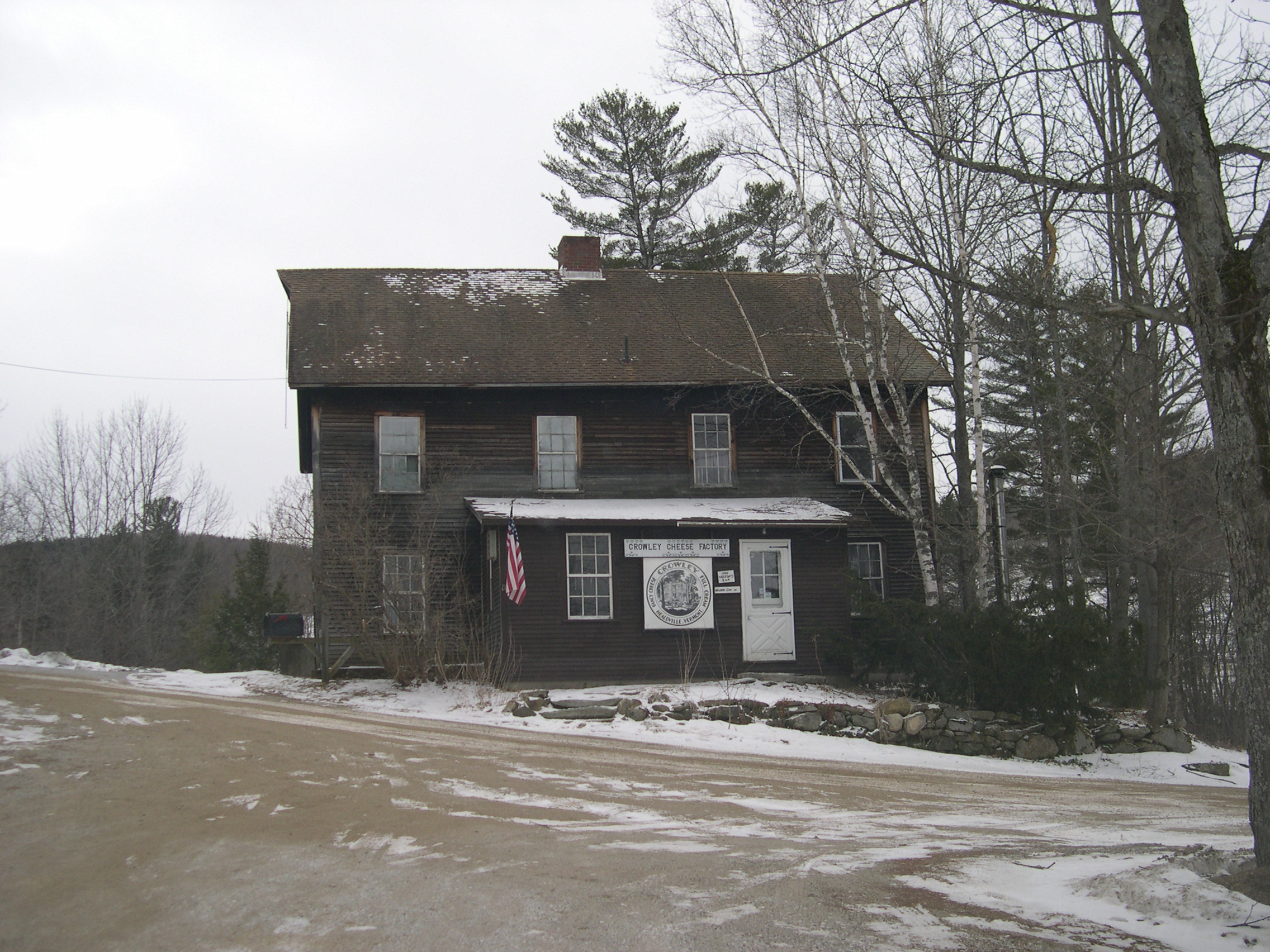

- Location within Vermont Location within the United States
- Location: 14 Crowley Ln., Healdville, Vermont
- Coordinates: 43°25′26″N 72°47′13″W
- Area: 2 acres (0.81 ha)
- Built: 1881
- NRHP reference No.: 79000226
- Added to NRHP: October 11, 1979

The Crowley Cheese Factory is a historic factory at 14 Crowley Lane in Healdville, Vermont. It is the home of the Crowley Cheese Company, which is believed to be the oldest indigenous manufacturer of cheese in the United States. The factory was built in 1881, and still makes cheese using its original methods and recipes. The factory was listed on the National Register of Historic Places in 1979.

== Description and history ==
The Crowley Cheese Factory stands about 1.3 miles (2.1 km) southwest of the rural village of Healdville in Mount Holly, Vermont. The factory building is a modest 2 1/2-story wood-frame structure, measuring about 30 by 40 feet (9.1 m × 12.2 m), with a gabled roof, center chimney, and clapboard siding. Its front facade is four bays wide, with a project shed-roof single-story vestibule covering the center two bays of the ground floor. The gabled south facade is three bays wide, with a second entrance set between the rightmost bay and the corner, and with loading doorways on all three levels at the center. A short boom projects at the top of the gable, providing a place to attach hoisting mechanisms for accessing those entrances. The ground floor is where the cheese is made, with vats taking up much of one half and a drying area the other. The shed-roof wing contains equipment for waxing finished wheels of cheese. Cheeses are aged either in the basement or the second floor, in facilities that are now climate controlled.

The Crowley Cheese Company was founded in 1881 by A. Winfield Crowley, and was owned by three generations of the family for 85 years. It was formed to take surplus milk from area farmers, which would be turned into cheese and sold at the Healdville railroad depot. The Crowleys had already been making cheese from their own milk at facilities at the farm, just up the hill from this factory's location. In the days before modern refrigeration, factories like this were common all across the state. Most succumbed due to the decline of Vermont's farms and the advent of refrigeration, which enabled shipment of dairy products across much greater distances. The Crowley Cheese Company is believed to be the oldest surviving cheese company in the state, and one of the oldest in the nation in continuous operation.

== See also ==
- National Register of Historic Places listings in Rutland County, Vermont

== External life ==
- Official Website
