= Vermont Route 140 =

State highway in Rutland County, Vermont, US

Vermont Route 140
- VT 140 highlighted in red

Route information
- Maintained by VTrans and the towns of Poultney, Middletown Springs, Tinmouth, and Wallingford
- Length: 25.059 mi (40.329 km)

Major junctions
- West end: VT 30 in Poultney
- US 7 in Wallingford
- East end: VT 103 in Mount Holly

Location
- Country: United States
- State: Vermont
- Counties: Rutland

Highway system
- State highways in Vermont
← VT 139	→ VT 141
← VT 103	→ VT 104

Vermont Route 140 (VT 140) is a state highway in the U.S. state of Vermont. The highway runs 25.059 miles (40.329 km) from VT 30 in Poultney east to VT 103 in Mount Holly. VT 140 connects the southern Rutland County towns of Poultney, Middletown Springs, Tinmouth, Wallingford, and Mount Holly.

== Route description ==
VT 140 begins at a four-way intersection with VT 30 in the incorporated village of Poultney in the town of Poultney. VT 30 heads north as Beaman Street and south as Grove Street, and VT 140 heads east as Main Street; the west leg of the intersection is Main Street, which passes through the Poultney Main Street Historic District and leads to Green Mountain College. VT 140 parallels the Poultney River east from the village and passes through the East Poultney Historic District. The highway crosses Finel Hollow Brook, Clark Hollow Brook, and the river before entering the town of Middletown Springs along West Street. VT 140 crosses the river and Vail Brook on its way to the Middletown Springs Historic District. In the center of town, the highway intersects VT 133 (South Street). The two highways run concurrently on East Street from the village to shortly after they enter the town of Tinmouth, where VT 133 splits north onto North Road.

VT 140 leaves the Poultney River valley at the river's headwaters and heads east and then south to the center of Tinmouth, which is featured in the Tinmouth Historic District. From the center of town, the highway heads east and descends to the Clarendon River. VT 140 has a pair of right-angle turns as it ascends from the river valley. On entering the town of Wallingford, the highway descends into the valley of Otter Creek, which the highway crosses at the western edge of the village of Wallingford. VT 140 enters the village on Florence Street, which has a grade crossing of the Vermont Railway's north–south mainline. The highway then immediately turns north onto Railroad Street, which crosses Roaring Brook, and east onto Depot Street, which heads through the Wallingford Main Street Historic District. VT 140 continues along School Street east of the route's intersection with U.S. Route 7 (US 7) (Main Street). The highway ascends the main range of the Green Mountains along Roaring Brook, which it crosses several times, and intersects the Long Trail and the Appalachian Trail. Beyond the headwaters of Roaring Brook, VT 140 descends to the village of East Wallingford. The highway has a grade crossing of the Green Mountain Railroad and crosses the Mill River during its brief concurrency with VT 155. East of VT 155, VT 140 enters the town of Mount Holly and reaches its eastern terminus at VT 103.

The Vermont Agency of Transportation maintains the portions of VT 140 along the VT 133 concurrency and east of US 7. The towns of Poultney, Middletown Springs, Tinmouth, and Wallingford maintain the non–state-maintained portions of the highway within their borders. The portion of the highway from Poultney to the eastern junction with VT 133 is part of the Horace Greeley Memorial Highway.

== Major intersections ==
The entire route is in Rutland County.

Location	mi	km	Destinations	Notes
Town of Poultney	0.000	0.000	VT 30 (Beaman Street/Grove Street) / Main Street west – Wells, Castleton Corners	Western terminus
Middletown Springs	8.170	13.148	VT 133 south (South Street) – Pawlet	Western end of concurrency with VT 133
Tinmouth	10.214	16.438	VT 133 north (Morgan Road) – Ira, West Rutland	Eastern end of concurrency with VT 133
Wallingford	18.564	29.876	US 7 (Main Street) – North Clarendon, Rutland, South Wallingford, Manchester	
Wallingford	24.739	39.814	VT 155 north	Western end of concurrency with VT 155
Wallingford	24.826	39.954	VT 155 south – Weston, Londonderry	Eastern end of concurrency with VT 155
Mount Holly	25.059	40.329	VT 103 – Mount Holly, Ludlow	Eastern terminus
1.000 mi = 1.609 km; 1.000 km = 0.621 mi: Concurrency terminus
