= Tinmouth =

Tinmouth may refer to:

- Tinmouth, Vermont, USA
  - Tinmouth Historic District
- Teignmouth (pronounced Tinmouth), a town in Devon, England
- An archaic spelling of Tynemouth, a town in Northumberland, England
- Jenny Tinmouth (born 1978), motorcycle racer

== See also ==
- Teignmouth (disambiguation)
- Tinworth
- Morton Tinmouth, a hamlet in Durham, England
- Earl of Tinmouth, a title in the Peerage of England
