= Vermont Route 155 =

State highway in central Vermont, US

Vermont Route 155
- VT 155 highlighted in red

Route information
- Maintained by VTrans
- Length: 10.377 mi (16.700 km)
- Existed: May 1961–present

Major junctions
- South end: VT 100 in Weston
- North end: VT 103 in Wallingford

Location
- Country: United States
- State: Vermont
- Counties: Windsor, Rutland

Highway system
- State highways in Vermont
← VT 153	→ I-189

Vermont Route 155 (VT 155) is a 10.377-mile-long (16.700 km) north–south state highway in central Vermont, United States. It runs from VT 100 in Weston in the south to VT 103 in East Wallingford in the north. Much of the highway goes through the Green Mountain National Forest.

VT 155 was part of VT 8 until May 1961, when the section between Weston and Wallingford was re-designated.

== Route description ==
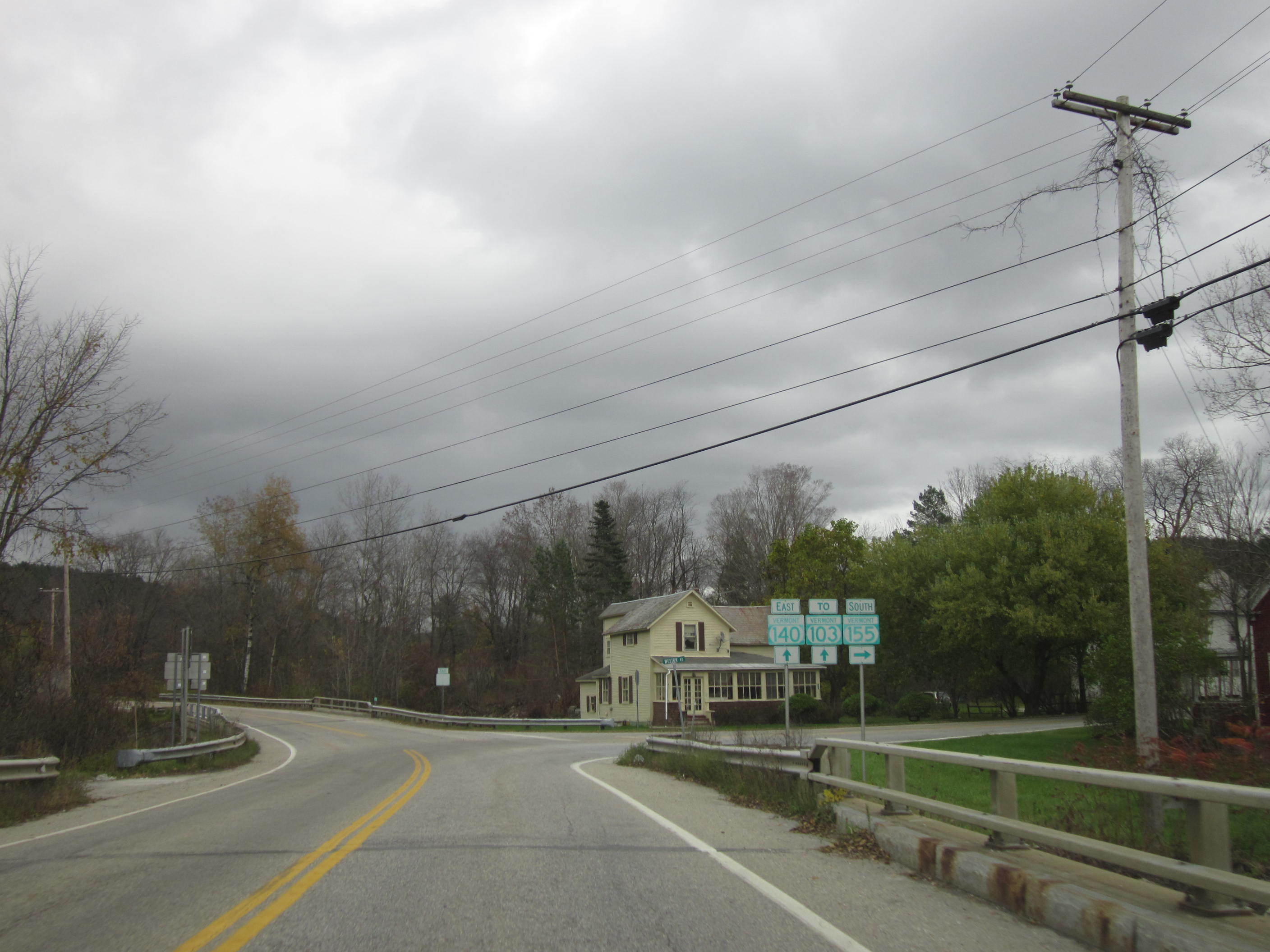
VT 155 at the junction with VT 140 in East Wallingford, marking the eastern end of the concurrency

VT 155 begins at an intersection with VT 100 in the Windsor County town of Weston. Running along the eastern edge of Green Mountain National Forest, VT 155 runs northwest along the West River. A two-lane mountain road, the route runs straight into the forest, making a junction with the dead-ending Forest Highway 299 (FFH 299). At FFH–299, VT 155 turns northeast and crosses into Rutland County. Now in the town of Mount Holly, the route continues along the forest border, turning northwest as Weston Road.

VT 155 winds along the border northwestward for several miles, paralleling the nearby Mill River. Bypassing the hamlet of Belmont, the route runs up the forest line, turning more towards the north. Before the junction with Fowler Brook Road, VT 155 turns northwest again, crossing railroad tracks and into the town of Wallingford. Now in the hamlet of East Wallingford, VT 155 reaches the Hubbardton River and a junction with VT 140. At this junction, VT 155 and VT 140 become concurrent for 0.087-mile (0.140 km) through East Wallingford.

At the junction with Village Street, VT 155 turns off of VT 140, running north for one block into a junction with VT 103. This junction marks the northern terminus of VT 155.

== Major intersections ==
County	Location	mi	km	Destinations	Notes
Windsor	Weston	0.000	0.000	VT 100 – Weston, Londonderry, Ludlow	Southern terminus
Rutland	Wallingford	10.021	16.127	VT 140 east – Ludlow	Eastern terminus of overlap
Rutland	Wallingford	10.108	16.267	VT 140 west – Wallingford	Western terminus of overlap
Rutland	Wallingford	10.377	16.700	VT 103 – Cuttingsville	Northern terminus
1.000 mi = 1.609 km; 1.000 km = 0.621 mi: Concurrency terminus
