= Mill River Unified Union School District =

School district in Vermont, United States

Mill River Unified Union School District (MRUUSD) is a school district headquartered in North Clarendon, Vermont. It serves, in addition to North Clarendon, Shrewsbury, Tinmouth, and Wallingford. Its predecessor districts operated under the umbrella organization Rutland South Supervisory Union.

== History ==
Tinmouth formally switched to the Rutland South supervisory union from the Rutland Southwest supervisory union circa 2013. Prior to the school district merger Tinmouth residents could choose which high school to attend tuition-free, with the majority choosing Mill River.

By 2015 the Vermont legislature passed Act 46, requiring school districts to consolidate, prompting the predecessor school districts under the supervisory union to formally consolidate into a unified school district. That year the state legislature approved of the consolidation into Mill River.

== Schools ==
Secondary

- Mill River Union High School

Elementary

- Clarendon Elementary School
- Shrewsbury Mountain School
- Tinmouth Mountain School
- Wallingford Elementary School
