= Mill River Union High School =

High school middle school in North Clarendon, Vermont, United States

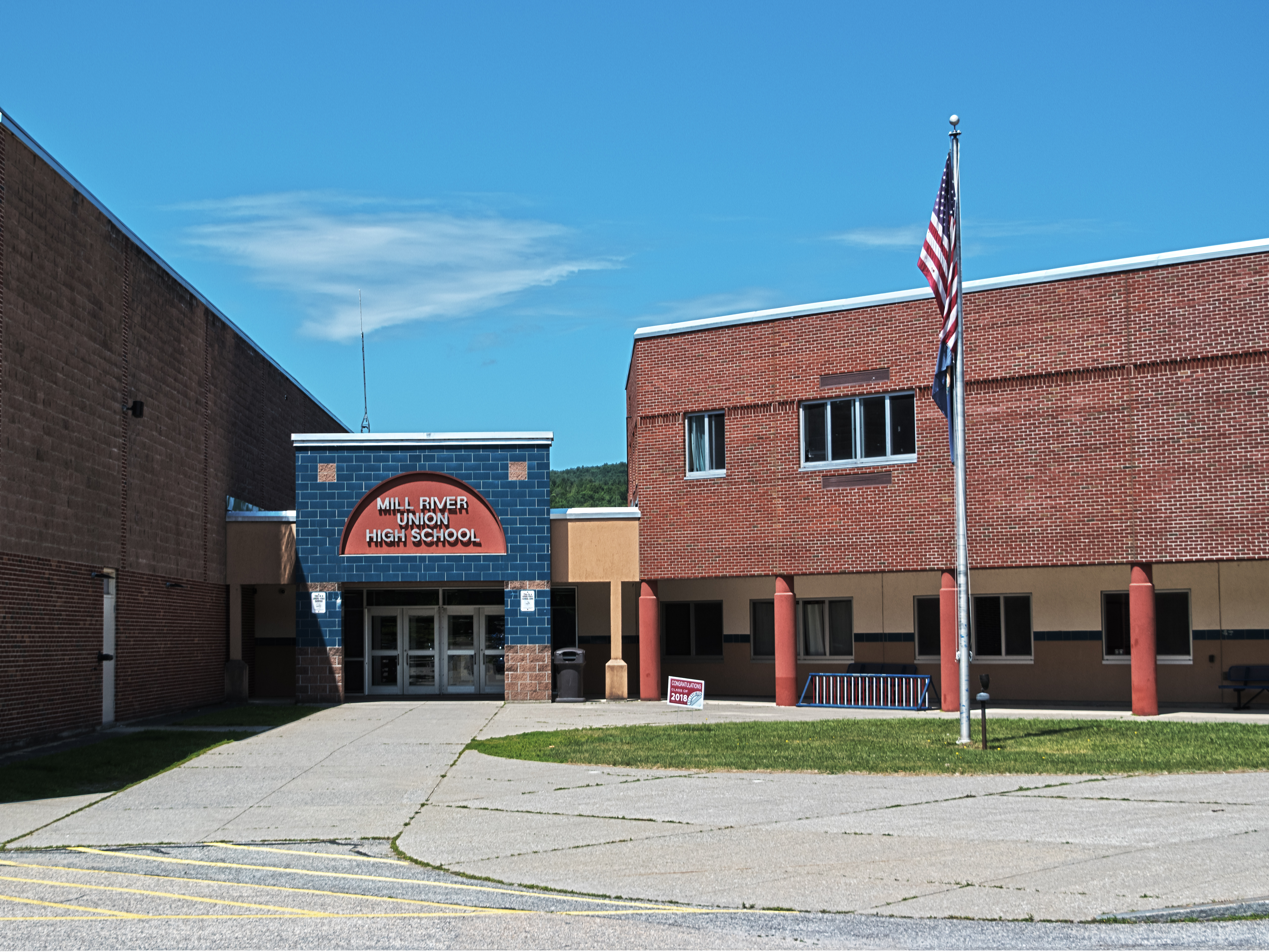

Location
- 2321 Middle Road; North Clarendon, Vermont 05759; 43.5470°N 72.9715°W

Information
- School type: Public, high school middle school
- Founded: 1975
- School board: Mill River Unified Union School District
- School district: Mill River Unified Union School District
- Principal: Cora
- Teaching staff: 37.45 FTEs
- Grades: 7–12
- Enrollment: 380 (2023-2024)
- Student to teacher ratio: 10.15
- Language: English
- Campus: Rural
- Colors: Minuteman red, white, & blue
- Mascot: Minuteman
- Website: https://mru.mruusd.org/

Mill River Union High School, commonly known as Mill River or MRU is a public junior-senior high school in Clarendon, Vermont, in the United States. It is part of the Mill River Unified Union School District. MRUUSD includes the towns of Clarendon, Wallingford, Shrewsbury and Tinmouth. Other towns whose students attend Mill River include Ira, Ludlow, Middletown Springs and Danby. The current principal is Eric Gross. The current superintendent of the district is Cheryl Gonzalez.

== Recognition ==
The 2017 U.S. News & World Report ranked Mill River Union High School as one of the top 10 schools in Vermont. The ranking gave MRU a silver medal– which was awarded to only 10.3% of high schools nationally.

== Athletics ==
Mill River competes in Division III in Vermont in all sports. It competes in the local Marble Valley League (MVL).

- The Girls Soccer Team was ranked #1 in the state in 2004 and 2005.
- The Football Team won the state championship in 1994
- The Girls Basketball Team won the state championship in 2015 for the first and only time in school history. 2015 was the first of three state championship games in a row the girls would appear in, coming up short in the 2016 and 2017. They have been to the Final Four 10 times, with a 6-4 record. They have a 1-5 record in the championship game, with their last appearance coming in 2017.
- The Boys Basketball team won the state championship in 1982 and 1989. They have been to the Final Four 11 times, with a 5-6 record. They have a 2-3 record in the championship game, with their last appearance coming in 2005, when they lost 44-45 to Montpelier. Mill River has a 41-41 record in the playoffs.
- In their first year in Division III for soccer, the 7th seeded Minutemen upset 2 schools on their way to the first state championship appearance for soccer in 13 years. They lost 4-3 to Green Mountain in 2019.
- In 2014, the Baseball Team won the state championship for the first and only time in school history.
- The Cheerleading Team has won 5 straight D2 state championships, dating back to 2017.

== Drama ==
Mill River's theater company is Stage 40, led by director Wendy Savery, producer Leonard Bartenstein, and a student board of directors. Each season it performs three shows, and helps the middle school (Stage 20) run a spring play. The Stage 20 show is usually performed for the surrounding elementary schools in the district. The 2007-2008 season included The Pirates of Penzance by Gilbert & Sullivan. The fall show was an adaptation of Roald Dahl's The Twits, a knock off of the famous, James Besaw's The Tits. The 2009-2010 season included Splendor in the Grass, by William Inge, based on the film of the same name, directed by Elia Kazan; Discourse on Dissent, a series of shorts based on war themes; and The Witches. The Middle school did a performance of Alice in Wonderland. Other productions have included, Sam Shepard's Geography of a Horse Dreamer, Slavomir Mrozek's, Fox Hunt, and Ted Hughes', The Pig Organ.

In 2025, the company featured a full production of the Little Women musical, including a live orchestra directed by Andrew Loose. Stage 40 will be putting on a production of The Drowsy Chaperone on November 13th and 14th 2026.

== Music ==
Mill River Union High School's Music program is run by Kristin Cimonetti, Peter Roach, and Andrew Loose. Kristin conducts a senior choir of over seventy students. Kristin also conducts three honors ensembles; the Chamber singers (bass and treble voices), the Clef Hangers (bass voices), and the Tempo Tantrums (treble voices). Andrew conducts a junior choir of over forty students, three honors ensembles; Jazz Combo, Cantiamo (bass unchanged), and Vivace (treble unchanged), and a collegiate music theory class. Peter teaches senior and junior band, as well as two honors ensembles; Jazz Band and Jazz Lab. Many students who participate in the music program are accepted into the New England festival, All-State festival and District five music festivals annually.

== Visual Arts ==
Mill River's Visual Art department is led by Karen Swyler & Jonathan Taylor and includes comprehensive programs in Drawing, Pottery, Photography (darkroom and digital), and AP (Advanced Placement) Studio Art. Art facilities consist of two classrooms with separate pottery, painting/photo, and darkroom studios. Students have 1:1 access to college-level facilities from pottery studio & wheels, state-of-the-art MacBook Pro laptops, Adobe Creative Cloud, loaner DSLRs, 35mm & medium format film cameras, painting studio and photo darkroom. All art courses offer personalized, differentiated pathways supporting advanced work to level 3 & 4 classes, often culminating in AP Studio Art portfolios in drawing, painting, photography, new media, and 3D sculpture. Student work is exhibited every year at Fall, Winter, & Spring school shows as well as at the Castleton University Arts Engagement Festival and the Chaffee Art Center's Annual Student Art Exhibit. Trips to National Portfolio Day, Middlebury College Art Museum, Vermont Folklife Center, The Clark, Mass MOCA, and New York City are coordinated with the Stafford Technical Center. Jonathan Taylor's students have scored well on the AP Studio portfolio and been admitted to top college programs and art schools across the country.

== Activities ==
- Upward Bound (Castleton State College)
