= Danby (CDP), Vermont =

Census-designated place in Vermont, United States

Danby, Vermont
- Census-designated place
- Location within Vermont Location within the United States
- Coordinates: 43°20′39″N 72°59′56″W
- Country: United States
- State: Vermont
- County: Rutland
- Towns: Danby; Mount Tabor

Area
  - Total: 0.71 sq mi (1.85 km^{2})
  - Land: 0.71 sq mi (1.85 km^{2})
  - Water: 0 sq mi (0.0 km^{2})
- Elevation: 689 ft (210 m)

Population (2020)
  - Total: 200
- Time zone: UTC-5 (Eastern (EST))
  - Summer (DST): UTC-4 (EDT)
- ZIP Code: 05739
- Area code: 802
- FIPS code: 50-16750
- GNIS feature ID: 2807147

Danby is an unincorporated village and census-designated place (CDP) in the towns of Danby and Mount Tabor, Rutland County, Vermont, United States. As of the 2020 census, it had a population of 200.

== Geography ==
The CDP is in southern Rutland County, split evenly between the town of Danby to the west and the town of Mount Tabor to the east. U.S. Route 7 passes through the east side of the community, leading north 9 miles (14 km) to Wallingford and south 13 miles (21 km) to Manchester Center.

Danby is bordered to the east by Otter Creek, the longest river entirely in Vermont, 6 miles (10 km) north of its headwaters in Dorset.
