= Kingsley Covered Bridge =

- U.S. National Register of Historic Places
- U.S. Historic district – Contributing property
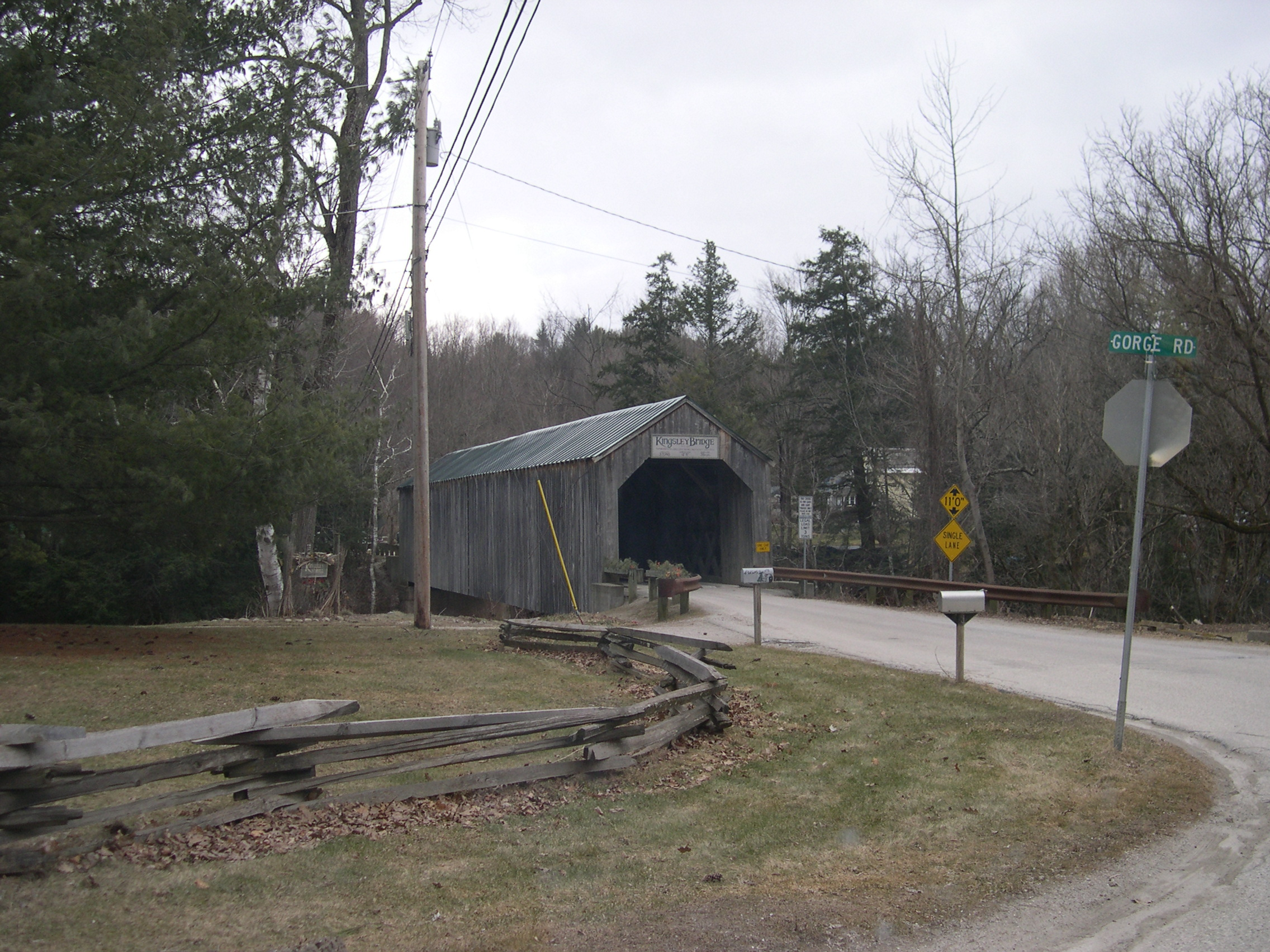
- The north approach to the Kingsley bridge. The Rutland Airport landing strip is on the hill just to the right of this photo
- Location: Clarendon, Vermont
- Coordinates: 43°31′24.74″N 72°56′29.85″W
- Area: 1 acre (0.40 ha)
- Built: 1870; 156 years ago
- Architect: Timothy K. Horton
- Part of: Kingsley Grist Mill Historic District (ID07001170)
- NRHP reference No.: 74000257

Significant dates
- Added to NRHP: February 12, 1974
- Designated CP: November 8, 2007

The Kingsley Covered Bridge (also called the Mill River Bridge) is a wooden covered bridge carrying East Street across the Mill River in Clarendon, Vermont. Built about 1870, it is the town's only surviving 19th-century covered bridge. The bridge was listed on the National Register of Historic Places in 1974.

== Description and history ==
The Kingsley Covered Bridge is located west of Vermont Route 103 and just under the landing strip for the Rutland Airport on East Street Extension off Gorge Road, a paved road that turns to dirt after crossing the bridge. It is adjacent to the Kingsley Grist Mill Historic District, consisting of a restored mill and houses. The bridge has a 3-ton weight limit.

The bridge is a single-span Town lattice truss structure, 121 feet (37 m) long and 17.5 feet (5.3 m) wide, with a roadway width of 14 feet (4.3 m) (one lane). The trusses rest on abutments that have been faced in concrete. The exterior is finished in vertical board siding, which extends from the sides, around the portals, and just inside the portals. It has a roof of corrugated metal.

The bridge bears a sign claiming to have been built in 1836, but the National Register nomination claims a construction date of about 1870. The bridge was built by Timothy K. Horton (1814-1896), and is the town's last surviving 19th-century bridge. The site has apparently had a bridge since the late 18th century, with references to a crossing being authorized there in 1788.

== See also ==
- National Register of Historic Places listings in Rutland County, Vermont
- List of Vermont covered bridges
- List of bridges on the National Register of Historic Places in Vermont
