= Wallingford Main Street Historic District =

Historic district in Vermont, United States

- U.S. National Register of Historic Places
- U.S. Historic district
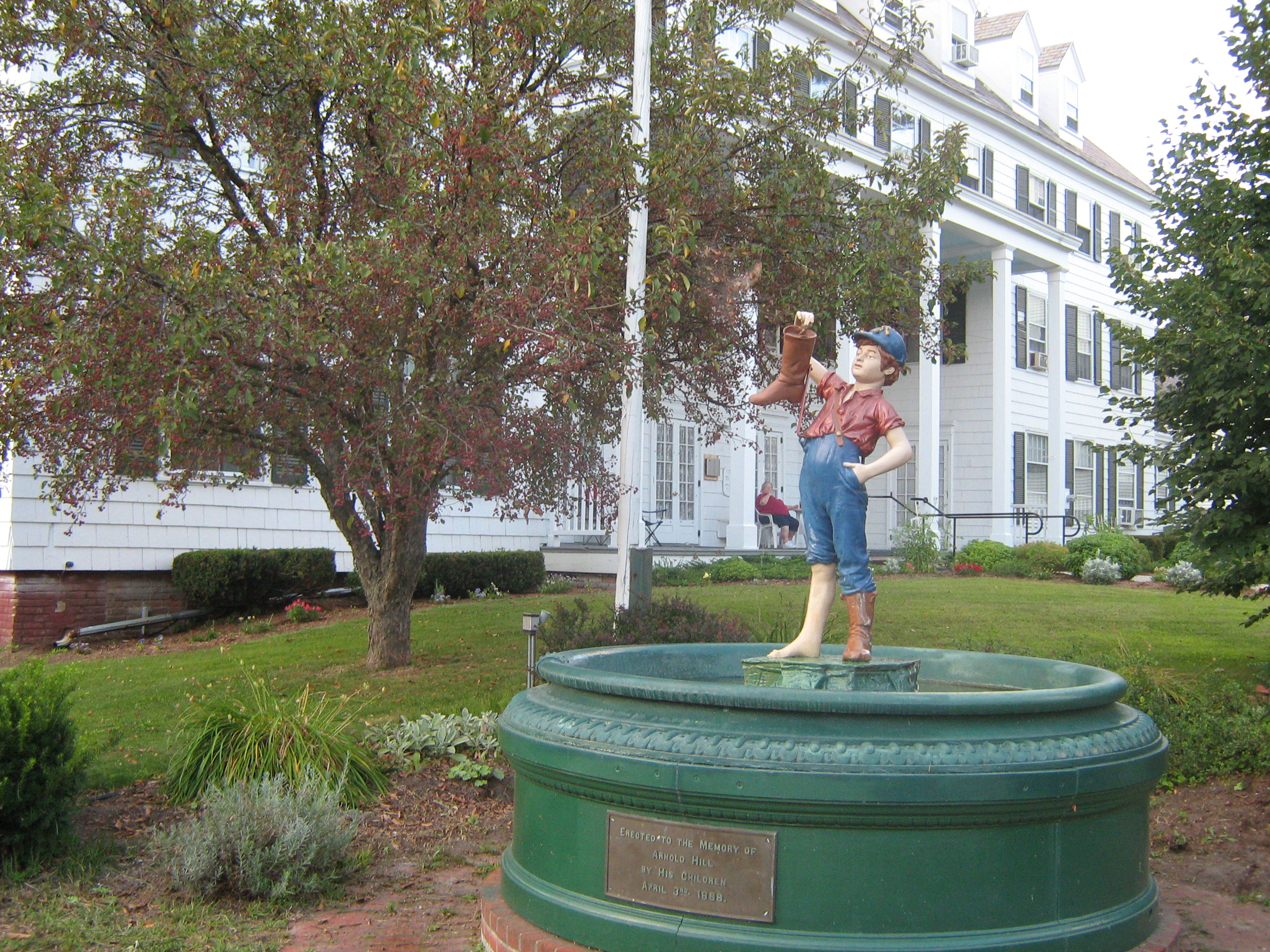

- Location within Vermont Location within the United States
- Location: Main and School Sts., Wallingford, Vermont
- Coordinates: 43°28′17″N 72°58′38″W
- Area: 65 acres (26 ha)
- Architect: Multiple
- Architectural style: Greek Revival, Late Victorian, Federal
- NRHP reference No.: 84000424
- Added to NRHP: November 1, 1984

The Wallingford Main Street Historic District encompasses the historic portions of the village of Wallingford, Vermont. An essentially linear district extending along Main Street (United States Route 7) on either side of School Street, it has a well-preserved array of 19th and early-20th century residential, commercial, and civic buildings. It was listed on the National Register of Historic Places in 1984.

== Description and history ==
Wallingford is a small agricultural community in the Otter Creek valley of central Vermont, 10 miles (16 km) south of Rutland. It was settled in the 1770s, with its main village established on Roaring Brook, a tributary of Otter Creek. It developed as an agricultural area, and as a stop on the north–south stagecoach route, now US 7. The village center developed as a commercial center, serving the area farmers, and housed local industries such as sawmills, tanneries, and a blacksmith. The stage route was the only significant road in the village, with School Street (Vermont Route 140) emerging later as a major cross street, running east–west north of Roaring Brook. In 1835, Lyman Batcheller opened a pitchfork manufactory, which expanded significantly after the railroad arrived 1852. These industries declined in the early 20th century, as did agriculture, which has been partially supplanted by the summer tourist trade. Most of the village's development after 1920 has taken place on side streets, leaving its Main Street with a largely turn-of-the-20th-century appearance.

The historic district extends along Main Street, from Franklin and Meacham Streets in the north, to just south of the Green Hill Cemetery in the south, and includes a few buildings facing School Street near the central junction of School and Main. Most of the buildings in the district are residential, in a cross section of architectural styles. Prominent civic and religious buildings in the district include the town hall and Baptist Church (both on School Street) and the Renaissance Revival library. Commercial buildings include the Italianate Odd Fellows block, and the Georgian Revival True Temper Inn.

== See also ==
- National Register of Historic Places listings in Rutland County, Vermont
