= Cuttingsville, Vermont =

- Village
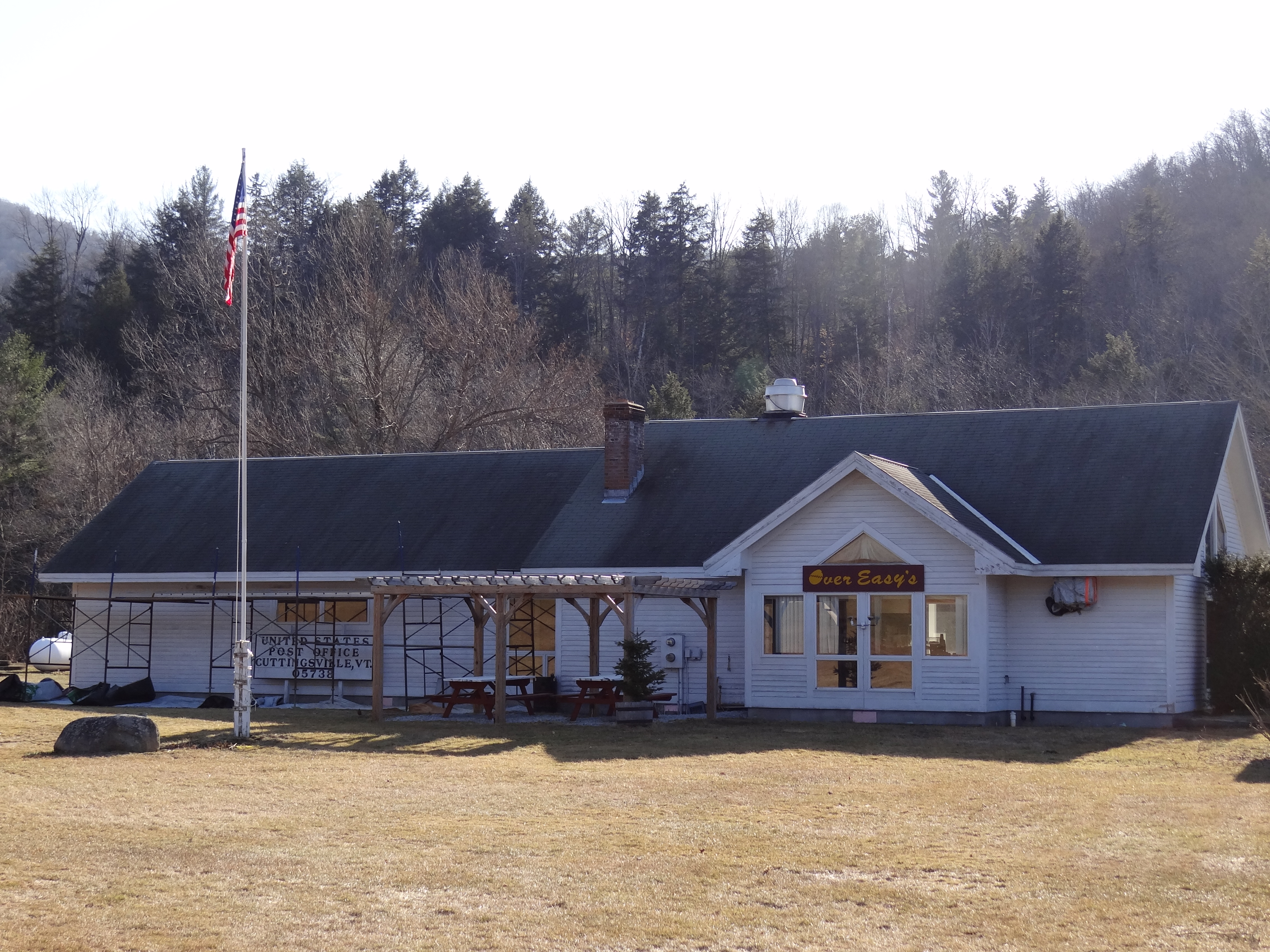
- Restaurant and post office in Cuttingsville

- Location within Vermont
- Coordinates: 43°29′18″N 72°52′56″W
- Country: United States
- State: Vermont
- County: Rutland
- Elevation: 1,014 ft (309 m)
- Time zone: UTC-5 (Eastern (EST))
  - Summer (DST): UTC-4 (EDT)
- ZIP code: 05738
- Area code: 802
- GNIS feature ID: 1460770

Cuttingsville is an unincorporated village in the town of Shrewsbury, Rutland County, Vermont, United States. The community is located along Vermont Route 103 and the Mill River 9.5 miles (15.3 km) south-southeast of Rutland. Cuttingsville has a post office with ZIP code 05738.
