= Mill River (Otter Creek tributary) =

Body of water in Rutland County, Vermont

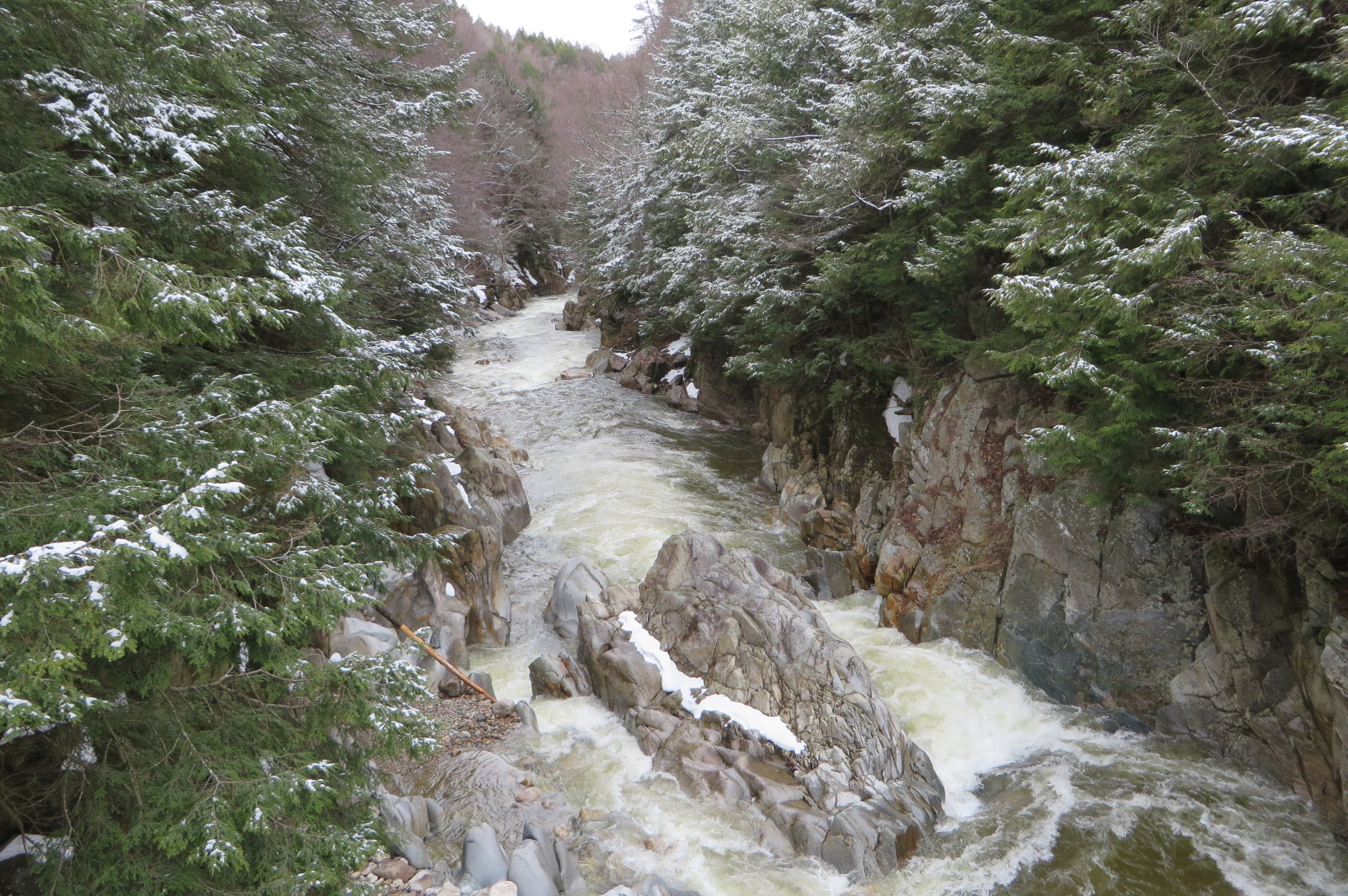
- The Mill River in Clarendon Gorge during spring runoff

Location
- Country: United States
- State: Vermont
- County: Rutland
- Towns: Mount Holly, East Wallingford, Shrewsbury, Clarendon

Physical characteristics
- Source
  - location: Mount Holly, Vermont
  - coordinates: 43.40430°N 72.80107°W
  - elevation: 650 m (2,130 ft)
- Mouth: Otter Creek
  - location: Clarendon, Vermont
  - coordinates: 43.50629°N 72.97574°W
  - elevation: 540 ft (160 m)
- Length: 28.7 km (17.8 mi)

The Mill River is a 17.8-mile-long (28.6 km) tributary of Otter Creek in Rutland County, Vermont, in the United States.

The Mill River rises in the southern part of the town of Mount Holly, west of the Okemo Mountain ski area in the Green Mountains. It flows northwest, paralleled by Vermont Route 155, to the village of East Wallingford, where it continues north and northwest paralleled by Vermont Route 103 and the Green Mountain Railroad. Just before entering the town of Clarendon it passes through Clarendon Gorge, where it is crossed by the Appalachian Trail. It turns west and then southwest at the village of East Clarendon, passes under U.S. Route 7, and reaches Otter Creek 1 mile (2 km) southwest of the village of Clarendon.

== See also ==
- List of rivers of Vermont
