= Mount Tabor, Vermont =

- Town
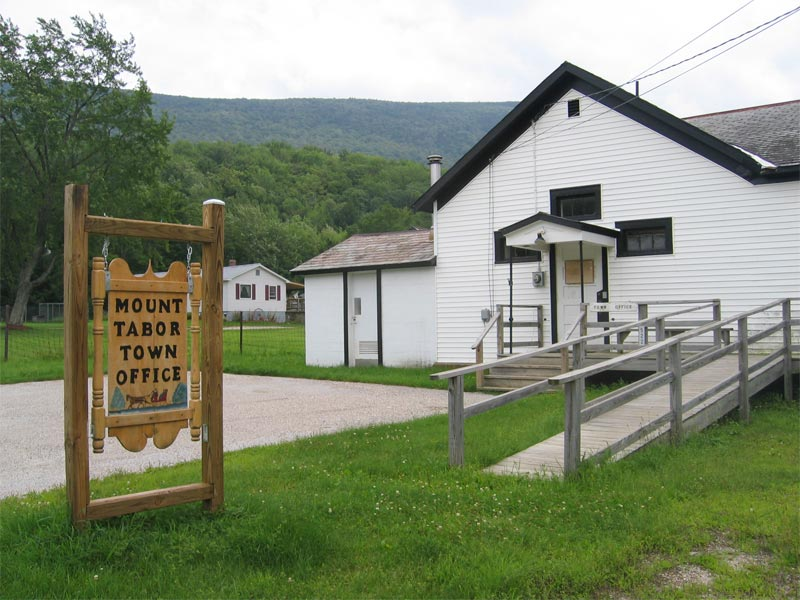
- Mount Tabor town offices

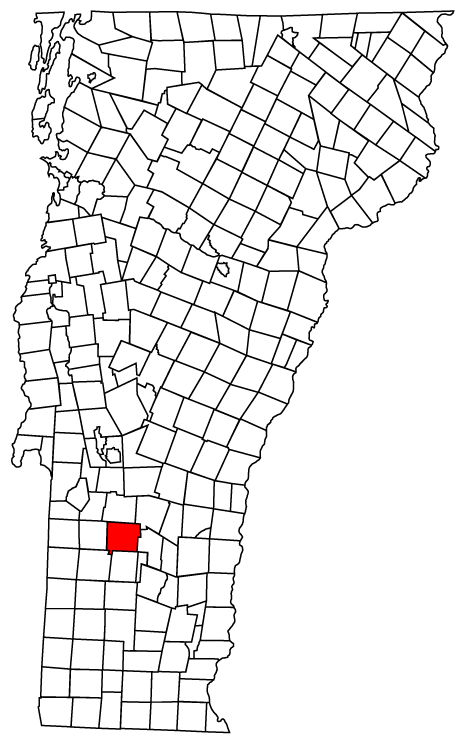
- Mount Tabor, Vermont
- Coordinates: 43°22′15″N 72°54′12″W
- Country: United States
- State: Vermont
- County: Rutland
- Communities: Danby (part); South End

Area
  - Total: 43.8 sq mi (113.4 km^{2})
  - Land: 43.7 sq mi (113.3 km^{2})
  - Water: 0.039 sq mi (0.1 km^{2})
- Elevation: 1,821 ft (555 m)

Population (2020)
  - Total: 210
  - Density: 4.8/sq mi (1.9/km^{2})
- Time zone: UTC-5 (Eastern (EST))
  - Summer (DST): UTC-4 (EDT)
- ZIP Codes: 05739 (Danby); 05742 (East Wallingford); 05253 (East Dorset)
- Area code: 802
- FIPS code: 50-47425
- GNIS feature ID: 1462156

Mount Tabor is a town in Rutland County, Vermont, United States. The population was 210 at the 2020 census.

== History ==
The town was incorporated as Harwich on March 18, 1788, then renamed Mount Tabor in 1803 to avoid confusion with Hardwick, Vermont.

== Geography ==
According to the United States Census Bureau, the town has a total area of 43.8 square miles (113 km^{2}), of which 43.7 square miles (113 km^{2}) is land and 0.1 square miles (0.26 km^{2}), or 0.11%, is water. Half of the unincorporated village of Danby is in the west part of town, along U.S. Route 7 on the west side of Otter Creek.

== Demographics ==
Historical population
Census	Pop.	Note	%±
1790	165		—
1800	153		−7.3%
1810	209		36.6%
1820	222		6.2%
1830	210		−5.4%
1840	226		7.6%
1850	308		36.3%
1860	358		16.2%
1870	301		−15.9%
1880	495		64.5%
1890	436		−11.9%
1900	494		13.3%
1910	289		−41.5%
1920	165		−42.9%
1930	173		4.8%
1940	213		23.1%
1950	186		−12.7%
1960	165		−11.3%
1970	184		11.5%
1980	211		14.7%
1990	214		1.4%
2000	203		−5.1%
2010	255		25.6%
2020	210		−17.6%
U.S. Decennial Census

As of the census of 2000, there were 203 people, 92 households, and 56 families residing in the town. The population density was 4.6 people per square mile (1.8/km^{2}). There were 121 housing units at an average density of 2.8 per square mile (1.1/km^{2}). The racial makeup of the town was 99.51% White and 0.49% Native American.

There were 92 households, out of which 27.2% had children under the age of 18 living with them, 48.9% were married couples living together, 8.7% had a female householder with no husband present, and 39.1% were non-families. 35.9% of all households were made up of individuals, and 16.3% had someone living alone who was 65 years of age or older. The average household size was 2.21 and the average family size was 2.80.

In the town, the population was spread out, with 21.7% under the age of 18, 3.4% from 18 to 24, 34.5% from 25 to 44, 26.1% from 45 to 64, and 14.3% who were 65 years of age or older. The median age was 40 years. For every 100 females, there were 101.0 males. For every 100 females age 18 and over, there were 98.8 males.

The median income for a household in the town was $32,250, and the median income for a family was $46,042. Males had a median income of $35,208 versus $20,938 for females. The per capita income for the town was $17,785. About 7.3% of families and 10.6% of the population were below the poverty line, including 14.9% of those under the age of eighteen and none of those 65 or over.

== Speed trap ==
A 2018 study by Vermont Public Radio found that Mount Tabor issued over $2 million in traffic fines since the stretch of US Route 7 passing through the edge of Danby village was lowered to 45 miles per hour (72 km/h) in 1999, receiving $131,074 in traffic fine revenue in 2017, which works out to $524 per inhabitant, resulting in a municipal tax rate one-third what it was in 1999 and the highest percentage of town revenue derived from traffic fines in the state.
