= Vermont Route 103 =

State highway in southern Vermont, US

Vermont Route 103
- VT 103 highlighted in red

Route information
- Maintained by VTrans
- Length: 42.036 mi (67.650 km)

Major junctions
- South end: US 5 in Rockingham
- I-91 in Rockingham; VT 100 in Ludlow
- North end: US 7 in Clarendon

Location
- Country: United States
- State: Vermont
- Counties: Windham, Windsor, Rutland

Highway system
- State highways in Vermont
← VT 102	→ VT 103A

Vermont Route 103 (VT 103) is a 42.036-mile-long (67.650 km) north–south state highway in southern Vermont, United States. It runs from U.S. Route 5 (US 5) in Rockingham in the east to US 7 in Clarendon near Rutland in the west. The Vermont Country Store's second branch is one attraction along the route, as well as the Okemo Ski Resort in Ludlow.

== Route description ==
VT 103 is a major arterial road for Vermont, being the most direct path from Boston and southeastern New England to Rutland and the Green Mountains ski areas and attractions. Although U.S. Route 4 is a shorter and slightly better road across the Green Mountains to Rutland, it is a direct east–west road intersecting Interstate 91 significantly north of the diagonal 103. Numerous proposals to widen 103 into a two-lane freeway or similar limited-access roadway have failed, even though a substantial power company right of way shadows the road for much of its length.

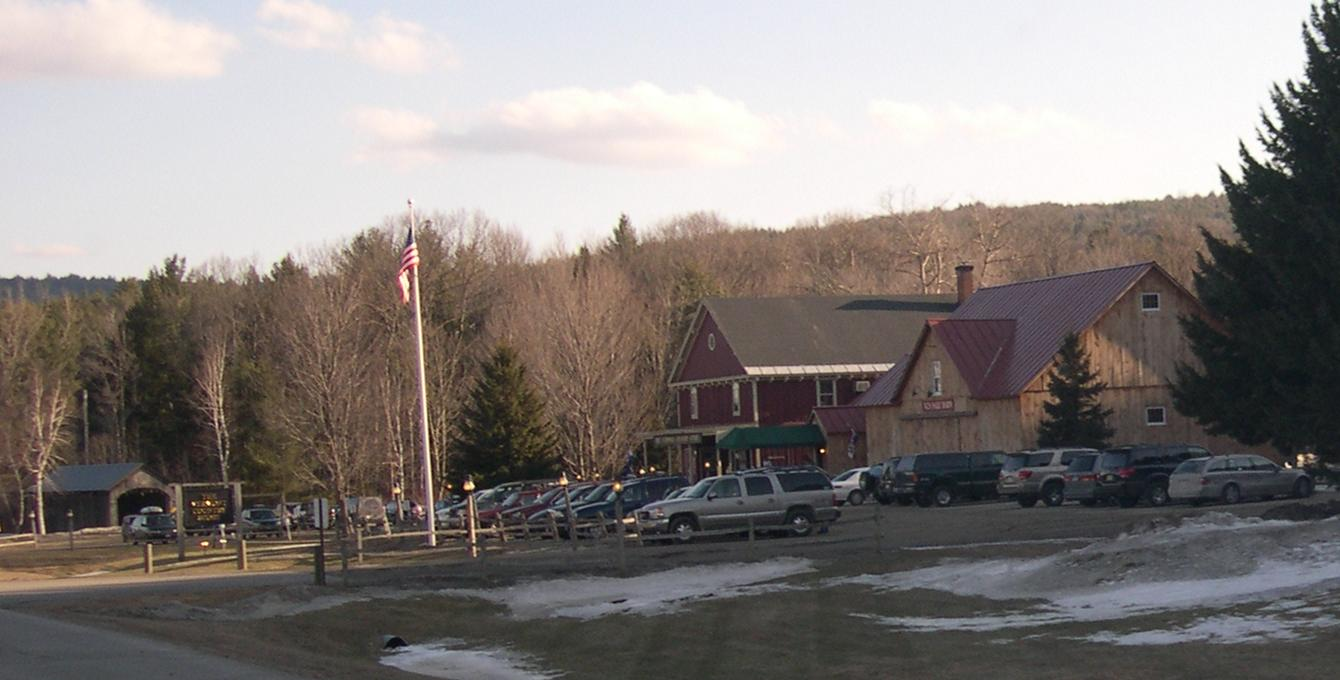
Vermont Country Store location on VT 103 in Rockingham

VT 103 begins at U.S. Route 5 in Rockingham just east of Interstate 91 and just north of Bellows Falls. From there, it interchanges with I-91 at exit 6. It proceeds northeast to a pair of intersections with Meetinghouse Road, a loop road connecting VT 103 to the Rockingham Meeting House. Farther northwest, the route passes by one of Vermont Country Store's two locations and intersects Williams Road and Lower Bartonsville Road, a pair of local roads leading to the Worrall Covered Bridge and the Bartonsville Covered Bridge, respectively. VT 103 continues as a wide sweeping road into Chester, Windsor County, where it briefly overlaps VT 11 and crosses the Williams River on a new bridge.

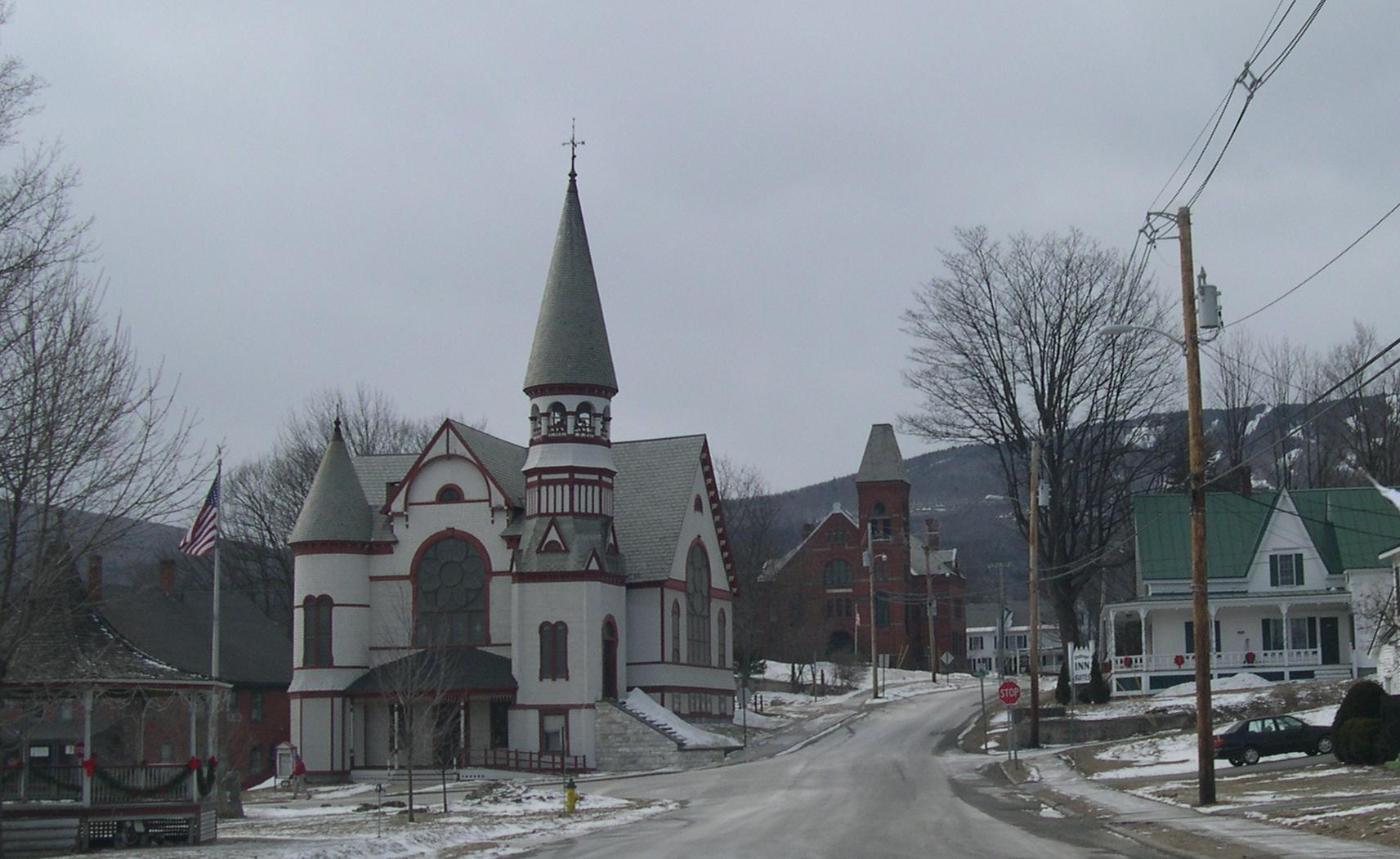
Ludlow Baptist Church and Black River Academy

Just north of Chester, VT 103 passes through Stone Village, an area listed on the National Register of Historic Places. Here, houses are made of local granite line both sides of VT 103. Outside of Stone Village, the road varies from a narrow, winding shoulder-less 2-lane between the river and mountains to a more wide-shouldered road. This variation remains until the village of Ludlow, where the route passes by the Ludlow Baptist Church and the Black River Academy near the village green. A few blocks to the west, VT 103 intersects VT 100 and joins VT 100 north past the Okemo Ski Resort into the town of Ludlow, where the concurrency ends roughly 1 mile (2 km) north of the village. While VT 100 continues north and parallels the county line, VT 103 turns west and crosses into Rutland County.

Across the county line in Mount Holly, VT 103 passes within a few miles of the Crowley Cheese factory as it heads into the Shrewsbury village of Cuttingsville with even more variations in road quality. Outside Cuttingsville, it proceeds through Clarendon, where it crosses over the conjoined Long and Appalachian Trails and intersects Airport and East Clarendon Roads, two local roadways leading, respectively, to the Kingsley and Brown Covered Bridges. Shortly after the junction with East Clarendon Road, VT 103 intersects VT 7B, the former routing of U.S. Route 7, before terminating at modern US 7 adjacent to the Rutland Airport, just south of Rutland.

== Major intersections ==
County	Location	mi	km	Destinations	Notes
Windham	Rockingham	0.000	0.000	US 5 (Missing Link Road / Rockingham Road) – Bellows Falls	Southern terminus
Windham	Rockingham	0.035– 0.255	0.056– 0.410	I-91 – Springfield, White River Junction, Brattleboro	Partial cloverleaf interchange; exit 6 on I-91
Windsor	Chester	9.242	14.874	VT 11 east (Pleasant Street) – Springfield	South end of VT 11 overlap
Windsor	Chester	9.629	15.496	VT 11 west (South Main Street) to VT 35 – Manchester, Grafton	North end of VT 11 overlap
Windsor	Chester	14.394	23.165	VT 10 east – North Springfield, Springfield	Western terminus of VT 10
Windsor	Cavendish	19.307	31.072	VT 131 east (Main Street) – Proctorsville, Cavendish	Western terminus of VT 131
Windsor	Village of Ludlow	22.449	36.128	VT 100 south (Andover Street) – Weston, Londonderry	South end of VT 100 overlap
Windsor	Town of Ludlow	24.283	39.080	VT 100 north – Tyson, Plymouth	North end of VT 100 overlap
Rutland	Mount Holly	33.525	53.953	VT 140 west to VT 155 – East Wallingford, Wallingford	Eastern terminus of VT 140
Rutland	Wallingford	33.924	54.595	VT 155 south (Village Street) – East Wallingford, Weston	Northern terminus of VT 155
Rutland	Clarendon	41.842	67.338	VT 7B	Former US 7
Rutland	Clarendon	42.036	67.650	US 7 – Wallingford, Rutland	Northern terminus
1.000 mi = 1.609 km; 1.000 km = 0.621 mi: Concurrency terminus
