= Kingsley Grist Mill Historic District =

Historic district in Vermont, United States

- U.S. National Register of Historic Places
- U.S. Historic district
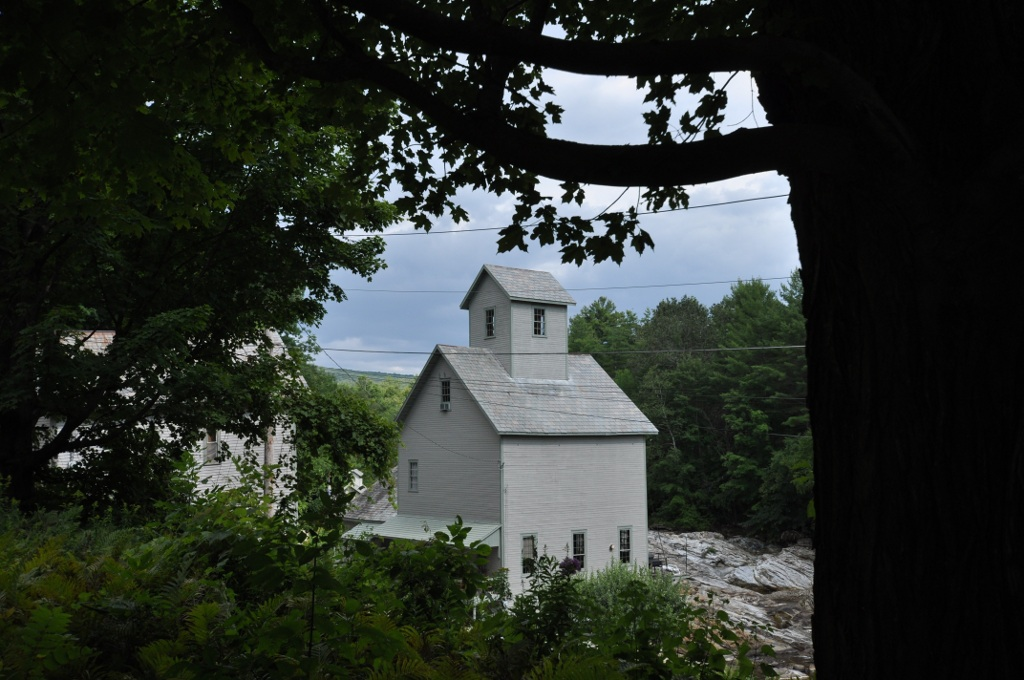
- The Kingsley Mill

- Location within Vermont Location within the United States
- Location: East St. & Gorge Rd., Clarendon, Vermont
- Coordinates: 43°31′27″N 72°56′26″W
- Area: 3 acres (1.2 ha)
- Built: 1778
- Architect: Powers, Nichols Montgomery; Horton, Timothy K.
- Architectural style: Federal, Queen Anne
- NRHP reference No.: 07001170
- Added to NRHP: November 8, 2007

The Kingsley Grist Mill Historic District encompasses a well-preserved small late 19th-century mill complex with surviving 18th-century remnants a Gorge and East Roads in Clarendon, Vermont. The complex includes a house, barn, mill and other outbuildings, and the nearby Kingsley Covered Bridge. The district was listed on the National Register of Historic Places in 2007.

== Description and history ==
The Kingsley Grist Mill complex is located southeast of the junction of Gorge and East Roads, a short way southeast of the Rutland Southern Vermont Regional Airport. Roughly 3 acres (1.2 ha) in size, it includes a c. 1778 house, 1885 horse barn, and a mill complex, most of whose elements date to the 1880s. The district also includes the foundational remnants of a second mill and the mill dam, a timber crib dam whose main structure was washed away by flooding in 1927. An old alignment of the main road connecting Clarendon to Shrewsbury is also believed to pass through the property (now serving as its main drive).

The house was built about 1778 by Ezra Crary and his son Nathaniel Crary, a veteran of the American Revolutionary War. Crary also built the first mills on the site, which were washed away by flooding in 1818. Crary sold the property in 1825 to Chester Kingsley, who built new mills on the site. His son Horace enlarged the house to its present configuration about 1835. Chester Kingsley's carding mill was destroyed by flooding in 1869, and the grist mill on the site underwent several upgrades in the 19th century, before being completely rebuilt for John Kingsley by Nichols Powers, generally better known as a builder of covered bridges. The grist mill was operated by the Kingsley's until 1935.

== See also ==
- National Register of Historic Places listings in Rutland County, Vermont
