= Silas L. Griffith =

American politician

Silas Lapham Griffith

Personal details
- Born: June 27, 1837 Danby, Vermont
- Died: July 21, 1903 San Diego, California
- Party: Republican
- Spouse(s): Mary Elizabeth Staples, Katherine Tiel

Silas L. Griffith (June 27, 1837 – July 21, 1903) was a Vermont businessman and politician. His lumber and charcoal operations made him the first millionaire in the state of Vermont and a major landowner.

== Early life ==
Silas Griffith was born to David and Sophia (Hadwen) in Danby, Vermont. As a boy Silas worked on the family farm but even as a youth showed a flair for driving a hard bargain and reinterpreting rules to his own benefit. His father one day offered to pay his sons for every rock moved from a field. The other brothers dutifully carried theirs to the stone walls around the field while young Silas distributed his in several piles around the field.

Griffith attended local schools until age 16, after which he worked for a few years at local stores in Danby and East Dorset. With these savings he attended Kimball Union Academy in Meriden, New Hampshire, for one year. This was the extent of his formal schooling.

Griffith then headed west for a teaching job, but the financial panic of 1857 stranded him in Buffalo, New York. With his few savings now devalued he could afford to neither continue west nor return home. With some money advanced by a cashier at a local bank he returned home to Danby where, borrowing money from an uncle, he opened a general store in his hometown.

With his natural aptitude for business, Griffith's store flourished. By the time he was 27 his business was valued at $48,000 ($990,000 in 2025 dollars). The business continued to prosper and Griffith's interests began to spread. He built a new store - at three stories it was the tallest building in southern Vermont. He also developed a spring-fed, gravity water system for his personal use and the operation of his works at the Danby Depot which were steam powered. The system was purchased by the Danby-Mt. Tabor Fire District #1 and now serves Danby Borough and the Brooklyn section of Mount Tabor.

== Personal life ==
Griffith married Elizabeth Staples (known at "Lottie"). Two daughters died before the age of two, and his son died at the age of ten. Only his daughter Jenny (mother unknown) survived to adulthood.

After 20+ years of marriage, and in an unusual event for that time, Griffith's wife sued for divorce on the grounds of "intolerable severity". The divorce was granted, and he paid her a one-time settlement of $20,000, a great deal of money at that time. Shortly after, he paid his secretary a one-time settlement of $10,000 as well, suggesting alternative definitions of "intolerable severity".

In 1891 Griffith was remarried, to Katherine Teil of Philadelphia, 18 years his junior. The new Mrs. Griffith was adamant that she would not live in the same house where Griffith had lived with his first wife. Griffith promptly set to work having the old house torn down (the lumber burned to make charcoal) and built a new beautiful home for his bride. The home boasted sweeping views, intricate woodwork, and exquisite stained glass windows. Upon the death of K. T. Griffith in 1939 her "adopted daughter", Emma Rising, inherited the estate, and she subsequently married Jay Earle Brown, an old flame from her teenage years. After they died in the early 1950s, Elmer Johnson purchased the estate and operated it as the Melody Inn, catering to skiers, hunters and fisherman. Bradley and Joslyn Bender operated it as the Hilltop Manor in the mid 1980s followed by three other owners, Lois and Paul Dansereau, George and Carol Gaines, and Brian and Kathy Preeble, who operated it as the Silas Griffith Inn. The Preebles lost the place to tax sale after nearly 10 years of shoddy operation, and in 2017 it became the private property of Thomas and Zachary Fuller, who own adjoining lands.

== Business career ==
Although he operated several businesses already, Griffith's real fortune came from Vermont's forested mountains. He acquired several large tracts of land, often through foreclosure, in the towns of Mount Tabor, Danby, Dorset, Arlington, Peru, Manchester, and Groton, eventually totaling more than 50,000 acres (20,000 ha). Griffith built in Mount Tabor small company town Griffith (later called "Old Job"), which boasted a school, store, boarding house (for male employees), a blacksmith and stables, four charcoal kilns, and a steam-powered sawmill, some 40-50 buildings in all.

He eventually built nine lumber mills, each with a small settlement to serve it, to reduce the distance logs had to be hauled to reach the railroad running through the valley and connecting Vermont to southern New England and New York. To connect his scattered holdings he installed what is believed to be the first telephone system in Vermont, connecting each mill to the main office and his home with some 70 miles (110 km) of copper wire.

Lumber was only one product to come out of the hills. Griffith may have been a wealthy man, but he could not abide waste and soon built some 35 huge charcoal kilns to convert scrap wood into charcoal, about a million bushels of it per year, which fueled steel furnaces in Lime Rock, Connecticut, and made Griffith Vermont's first millionaire.

Not content with this, Griffith collected the sawdust from his mills and sold it to ice houses to insulate the ice and prevent it from melting. Griffith created a fish hatchery, perhaps the first in the state, in the "South End" of Mt. Tabor, eventually supplying the Waldorf Astoria in New York City with fresh trout. In 1898 then-Senator Griffith acquired both timberland and a fish hatchery in Groton, Vermont. That fish hatchery was reputed to be the largest in the world and provided spawn for stocking rivers and lakes as well as adult fish for eating.

== Legacy ==
Griffith had a well-deserved reputation for squeezing both profits and workers. To prevent "clock watching" he forbade his workers to wear watches and insisted to critics that they enjoyed working from dawn to dark, leading "a life of excitement and ... pleasure". Workers and their families were expected to buy their food and clothing from the company's six general stores, cycling their wages back into Griffith's pocket.

Bradley Bender tells of one worker who quit his job and as he walked away was intercepted by Griffith, who reminded the worker of his unpaid tab at the company store - including the purchase of the pants he had on. Griffith insisted the man take them off and hand them over before leaving.

In his later years Griffith seems to have determined that he wanted to leave a better legacy behind than his Scrooge-like reputation. He donated money for the S.L. Griffith Memorial Library, which serves Danby to this day, an orphans fund, and several other buildings in town.

Silas Griffith and his wife left money and instructions in their wills to establish a gift fund. At an annual Christmas party, a tradition still going strong today, each child in Danby and Mt. Tabor between the ages of 2 and 12 is to receive a gift and, by Griffith's instructions, an orange. This tradition is cherished through the generations in these two towns.

After Griffith's death on July 21, 1903, at his fruit ranch in San Diego, his business empire shut down. The remaining timberland in Mt. Tabor was sold to the Emporium Lumber Company; a disgruntled enemy had poisoned his fish hatchery, and charcoal was being replaced by anthracite.

Ultimately the U.S. Forest Service acquired much of Griffith's land, which is now covered in second-growth forest. Abandoned buildings and mills were burned as hazards or moved, charcoal kilns were torn down, and railroad sidings pulled up. The Appalachian Trail and Vermont's Long Trail formerly ran right through the site of the former mill town of Griffith, now marked only by a few stone foundations and an enormous pile of century-old sawdust. The trail is now called ‘Old Job’.
