= Teignmouth (disambiguation) =

Teignmouth is a town in Devon, England.

Teignmouth may also refer to:

- Teignmouth (album), a 1991 electronic music album
- Teignmouth (painting), an 1812 landscape painting by J. M. W. Turner
- Teignmouth railway station, a station in the town of Teignmouth
- Teignmouth R.F.C., a rugby football club
- Baron Teignmouth, a title in the Peerage of Ireland
- Teignmouth, a given name:
  - Teignmouth Melvill (1842–1879), English army officer
  - Teignmouth Philip Melvill (1877–1951), English polo player

== See also ==
- Tinmouth (disambiguation)
