= A Moose for Jessica =

1987 non-fiction children's book

- Author: Pat A. Wakefield with Larry Carrara
- Illustrator: Larry Carrara (photos)
- Cover artist: Larry Carrara
- Language: English
- Subject: Animals
- Genre: Non-fiction, Children's literature
- Publisher: Dutton (New York)
- Publication date: 1987
- Publication place: United States
- Media type: Print (Hardback)
- ISBN: 0-525-44342-8
- OCLC: 15856520
- Dewey Decimal: 599.73/57 19
- LC Class: QL737.U55 W35 1987

A Moose for Jessica is a 1987 non-fiction children's book about a moose named Josh who loved a cow called Jessica. The story is told by Pat A. Wakefield and is illustrated with photographs by Larry Carrara, the owner of the cow.

In 1986, Josh turned up at a farm in Shrewsbury, Vermont, and began to show a decided attraction toward Jessica, a Hereford cow. He stayed in the vicinity for 76 days. The visit of the moose inspired media attention and attracted tens of thousands of people to the area.

== Reception ==
Kirkus Reviews described the book as "unique, fascinating, and delightful." The New York Times Book Review commented: "This quiet, unpretentious story has the magic of credibility thanks to Pat A. Wakefield's simple, intelligent writing, enhanced by wonderful photographs."

It was named as an Outstanding Science Trade Book for Children by the National Science Teachers Association and as one of the year's best books by Publishers Weekly.
