= Tinmouth Historic District =

Historic district in Vermont, United States

- U.S. National Register of Historic Places
- U.S. Historic district
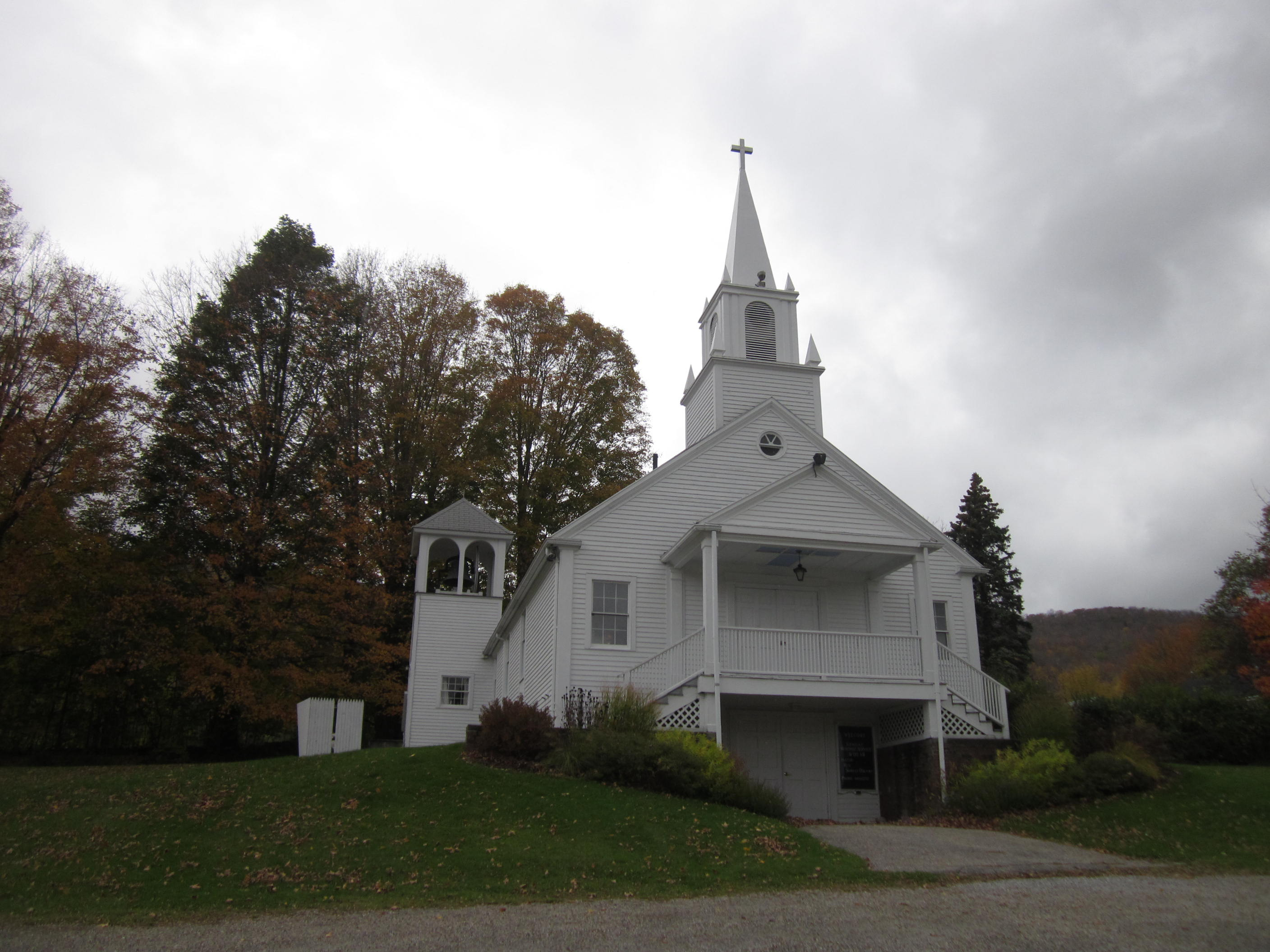

- Location within Vermont Location within the United States
- Location: VT 140 and Town Road #2, Tinmouth, Vermont
- Coordinates: 43°26′55″N 73°3′6″W
- Area: 15 acres (6.1 ha)
- Architectural style: Greek Revival, Federal, Italianate
- NRHP reference No.: 80000425
- Added to NRHP: June 25, 1980

The Tinmouth Historic District encompasses a cluster of residential and civic buildings that form the center of the village Tinmouth Center in Tinmouth, Vermont. The district contains a collection of well-preserved buildings, that are reflective of life in a rural 19th-century village. The district was listed on the National Register of Historic Places in 1980.

== Description and history ==
The town of Tinmouth was chartered in 1761, settled about 1770, and incorporated in 1777. It was for a few years the shire town of Rutland County. Its early economic development was from varied sources, including mills, tanneries, and iron smelting operations that took advantage of beds of iron ore. The town was bypassed by the construction of railroads in the region, and saw some economic success later in the 19th century with the advent of dairy farming. The town's small village center is reflective of these periods of development, with construction concentrated in the early and late decades of the 19th century.

Tinmount Center is located near the town's geographic center, and is organized around the four-way junction of Vermont Route 140, which runs north and east, Town Road 17, which runs west, and Town Road 2 (a.k.a. Mountain View Road), which runs south. Clustered around this intersection, mainly in a north-south orientation along VT 140 and Mountain View Road, are sixteen buildings, most of which are historically significant. Notable among these is the c. 1816 Noah Sawyer House, a fine example of Federal period architecture, and the town shed, a row of stalls built about 1840 that was used to house the horses of churchgoers. One example of the town's dairying history is the c. 1880 Old Creamery.

== See also ==
- National Register of Historic Places listings in Rutland County, Vermont
