= Middletown Springs Historic District =

Historic district in Vermont, United States

- U.S. National Register of Historic Places
- U.S. Historic district
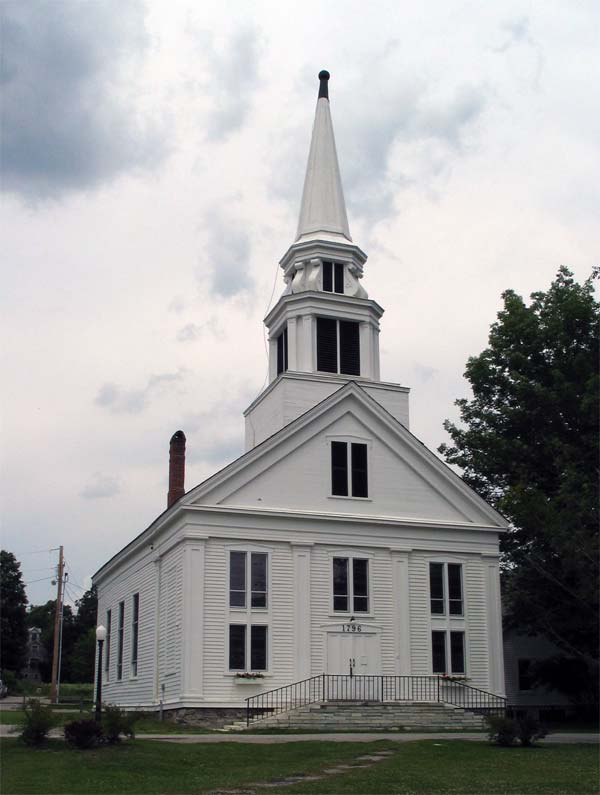

- Location within Vermont Location within the United States
- Location: East, North, South, and West Sts., Montvert Ave., and Schoolhouse Rd., Middletown Springs, Vermont
- Coordinates: 43°29′3″N 73°7′7″W
- Area: 105 acres (42 ha)
- Architectural style: Greek Revival, Italianate
- NRHP reference No.: 85003239
- Added to NRHP: October 17, 1985

The Middletown Springs Historic District encompasses most of the village center of Middletown Springs, Vermont. Oriented around the crossroads junction of Vermont Routes 140 and 133, the village has a well-preserved collection of mainly mid-19th century architecture, including a significant number of Italianate buildings. The district was listed on the National Register of Historic Places in 1985.

== Description and history ==
The town of Middletown Springs was settled before the American Revolutionary War, and was incorporated in 1784. Its town center is located at the site of the supposed first house, a log structure (not surviving) built by Luther Fillmore. The orientation of the roads along the compass points took place not long after the town was organized. Proximity to the Poultney River meant the placement of grist and saw mills, a source of early economic activity. A. W. Gray, a local millwright, developed a new type of horse engine in the 1850s, and his factory, located in an old mill, flourished, resulting in a construction boom in the 1850s-1870s, including the construction of a number of vernacular and high-style Italianate houses. Although Gray's company declined after the 1880s (with the advent of the internal combustion engine), Gray also developed the Middletown mineral springs as a resort area, drawing tourists to the area in the late 19th century.

The historic district is centered on the junction of North, East, South, and West Streets, with the village common at the northeast corner of the junction, and the cemetery at its southwest. It radiates in all four directions, petering out into rural agricultural landscape. To the south, the district extends beyond the Poultney River, and along Mont Vert Road for a short distance. There are 91 buildings in the district, most of which are residences 1-1/2 or 2-1/2 stories in height. Wood construction with clapboarded exterior is typical. Prominent buildings include the Greek Revival community church at the north end of the common, and several high style Italianate houses. The Colonial Revival school house, set southwest of the cemetery, is the largest building in the district.

== See also ==
- National Register of Historic Places listings in Rutland County, Vermont
