= Poultney Main Street Historic District =

Historic district in Vermont, United States

- U.S. National Register of Historic Places
- U.S. Historic district
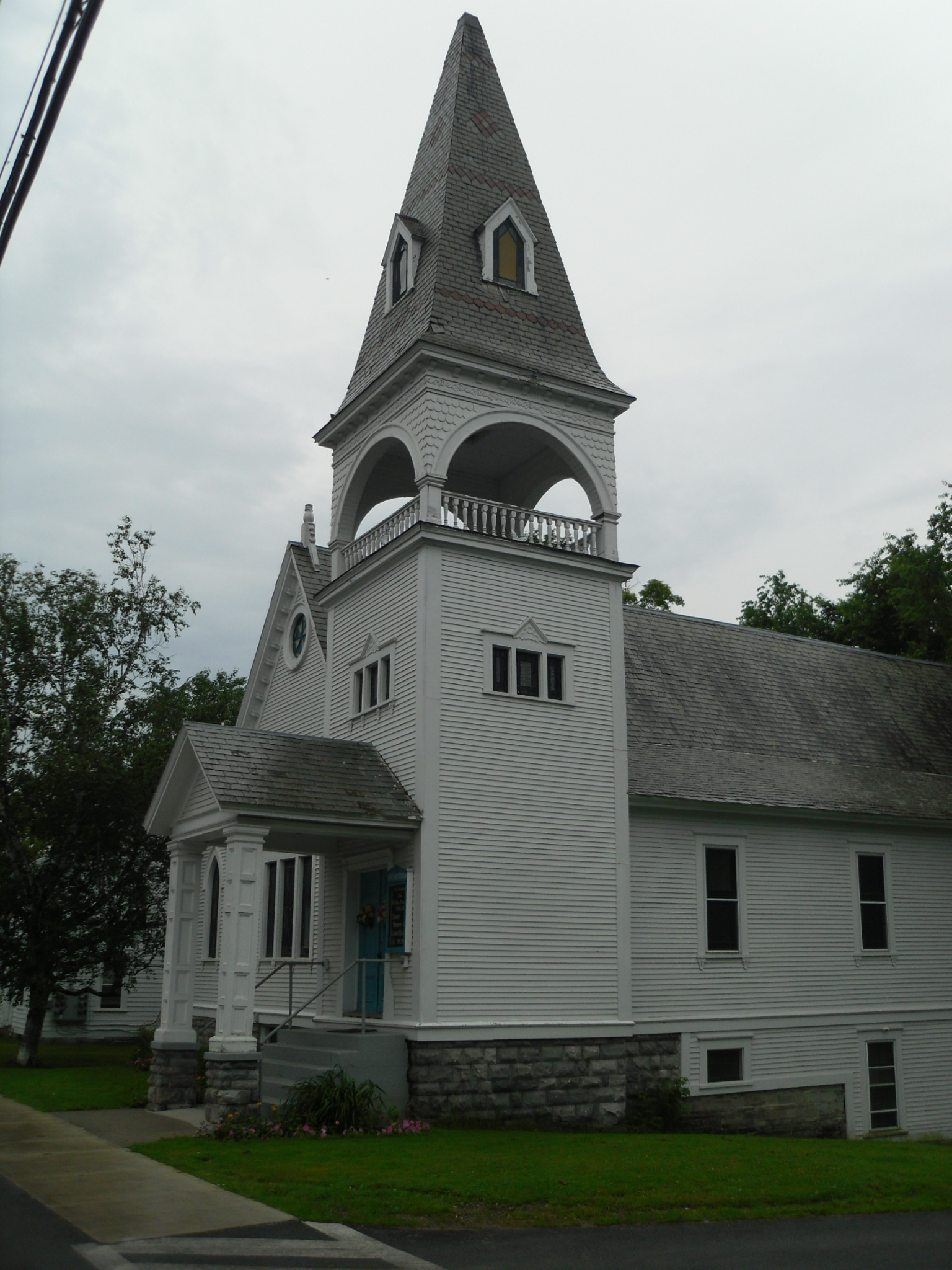

- Location within Vermont Location within the United States
- Location: Roughly Main St., E. Main St., Depot St., Knapp Ave., Beaman St., Grove St., Maple Ave., and College Ave., Poultney, Vermont
- Coordinates: 43°31′2″N 73°14′5″W
- Area: 30 acres (12 ha)
- Architect: Towne, William; Et al.
- Architectural style: Late 19th And 20th Century Revivals, Greek Revival, Late Victorian
- NRHP reference No.: 88000649
- Added to NRHP: June 2, 1988

The Poultney Main Street Historic District encompasses the commercial and residential historic core of the village of Poultney, Vermont. Centered on Main Street and East Main Street, between College Avenue and St. Raphael's Catholic Church, the district includes a diversity of architectural styles, as well as civic, religious, and commercial functions spanning a period of more than 100 years. The district was listed on the National Register of Historic Places in 1988.

== Description and history ==
The town of Poultney was settled in 1771, and by 1800 had developed two distinct village centers. Poultney village is the western of the two, and eventually came to dominate economically over the original town center at East Poultney. Its Main Street was laid out oriented east-west, inside an arcing bend in the Poultney River. The principal intersection was first made with the stagecoach route between Burlington and Albany, New York, at Beaman Street (Vermont Route 31 heading north) and Grove Street (Vermont Route 30, heading south). The village's importance as a transit stop was further cemented by the arrival of the Rutland and Washington Railroad, which paralleled the stage route to the west, and the development of the slate quarrying industry. The slate industry survived until the Great Depression of the 1930s. The result of this development history is an architecturally diverse Main Street.

The historic district extends along Main Street, a broad boulevard, from College Avenue in the west to St. Raphael's Catholic Church, east of Route 30, to the east. In addition, it includes properties adjacent to the railroad tracks on Depot, Church, and Knapp Streets, and extends a short distance on Beaman and Grove Streets. Most of the buildings one or two stories in height, with the commercial buildings general two story brick buildings with commercial Italianate styling. The western section is mainly residential, set between the railroad tracks and the campus of Green Mountain College, while the commercial and civic area extends from the railroad tracks east. The majority of the district's buildings are either Italianate or Colonial Revival in style, although there are examples of Greek Revival, Queen Anne, and American Craftsman architecture as well.

== See also ==
- National Register of Historic Places listings in Rutland County, Vermont
