= Tinworth =

Tinworth is an English surname.

== List of people with the surname ==
- Adam Tinworth (born 1971), British journalist and writer
- George Tinworth (1843–1913), English ceramic artist

== See also ==
- Tinworth, a fictional Cornish village, the location of Shell Cottage in J. K. Rowling's Harry Potter and the Deathly Hallows
