= East Poultney Historic District =

Historic district in Vermont, United States

- U.S. National Register of Historic Places
- U.S. Historic district
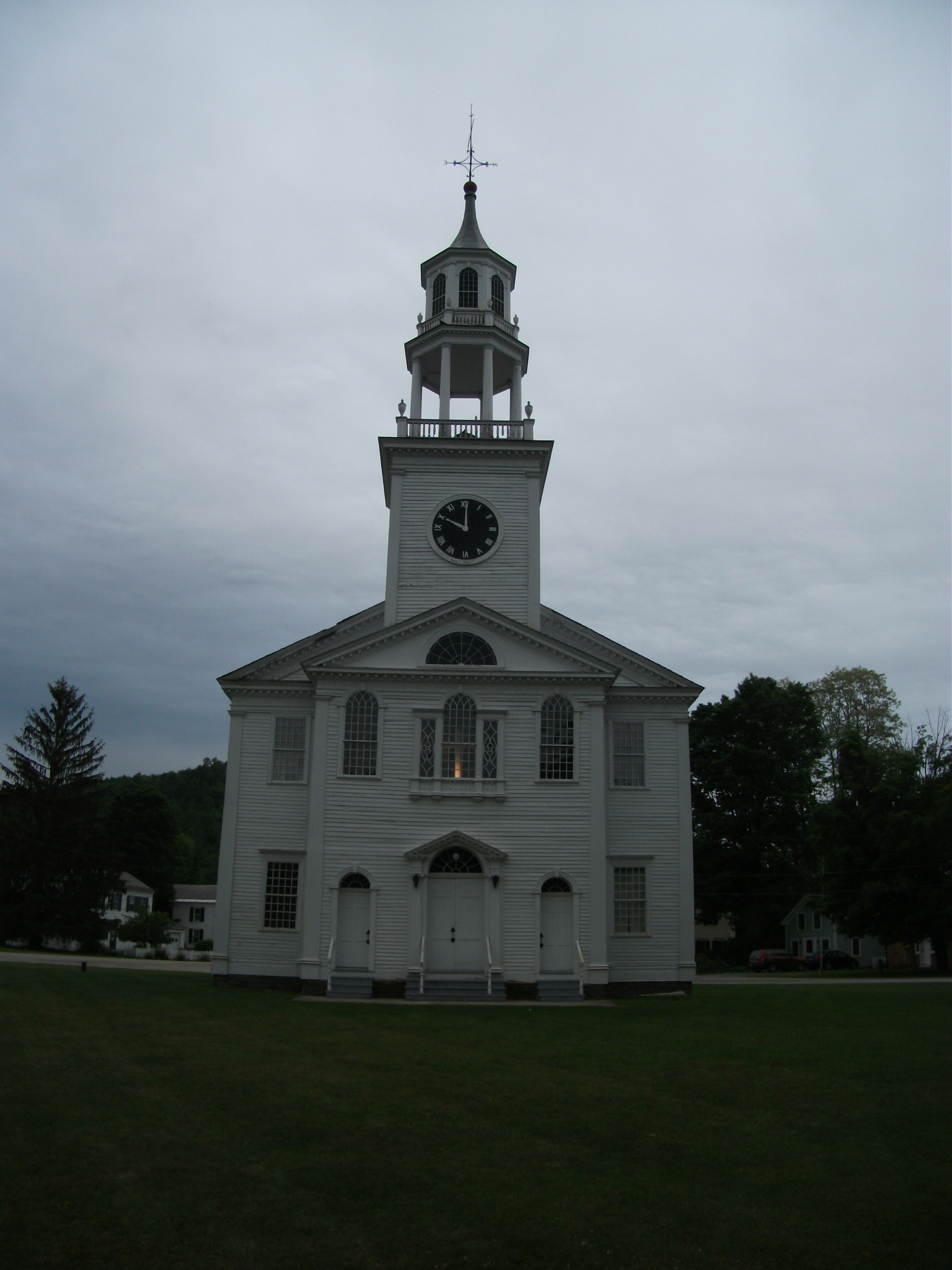

- Location within Vermont Location within the United States
- Location: Village Green and environs, East Poultney, Vermont
- Coordinates: 43°31′31″N 73°12′24″W
- Area: 68 acres (28 ha)
- Architect: Multiple
- Architectural style: Mid 19th Century Revival, Federal
- NRHP reference No.: 78000241
- Added to NRHP: January 31, 1978

The East Poultney Historic District encompasses the historic center of the rural village of East Poultney, Vermont. The district is centered on the triangular green at the center of the village, and was developed mainly from the late 18th through mid-19th centuries, producing a village with strong Federal and Greek Revival architecture. It was listed on the National Register of Historic Places in 1978.

== Description and history ==
The town of Poultney was chartered in 1761 but not settled until 1771. East Poultney was its original town center, and thrived in the late 18th and early 19th centuries, with modest industrial activity powered by the Poultney River. The village was eclipsed in economic, and eventually civic importance by what was then known as West Poultney, and is now the village of Poultney. That village benefited by the presence of the major north–south route in the area (now Vermont Route 30), and the construction of the railroad. Growth and development in East Poultney was thereafter quite modest.

The district is centered on the triangular village green, which is bounded by Bird Street, On The Green, and East Main Street (Vermont Route 140). Parts of the district extend west along Main Street and east along River Street, which runs eastward just after On The Green (renamed Thrall Road) crosses the Poultney River. The village green is occupied in part by the East Poultney Baptist Church, a fine Federal period church designed by local builder Elisha Scott, whose work is found throughout the district. The earliest surviving remnant of the village's original small industries is a c. 1810 blacksmith shop, which later housed an organ factory, and is now used by the Poultney Historical Society as a museum. Additional notable surviving structures include: the Union Academy of 1791 (perhaps the oldest surviving schoolhouse in Rutland County), St. John's Gothic Revival Episcopal Church of 1832, the colorful Queen Anne style East Poultney Schoolhouse of 1896, the Federal style Eagle Tavern (circa 1790) frequented by Ethan Alien and his Green Mountain Boys, Village Store on the Green circa 1840, Horace Greeley House of 1823 where the future founder of the New York Tribune learned his trade, and the 1840s Tannery by the river.

== See also ==
- National Register of Historic Places listings in Rutland County, Vermont
