= Tinmouth, Vermont =

- Town
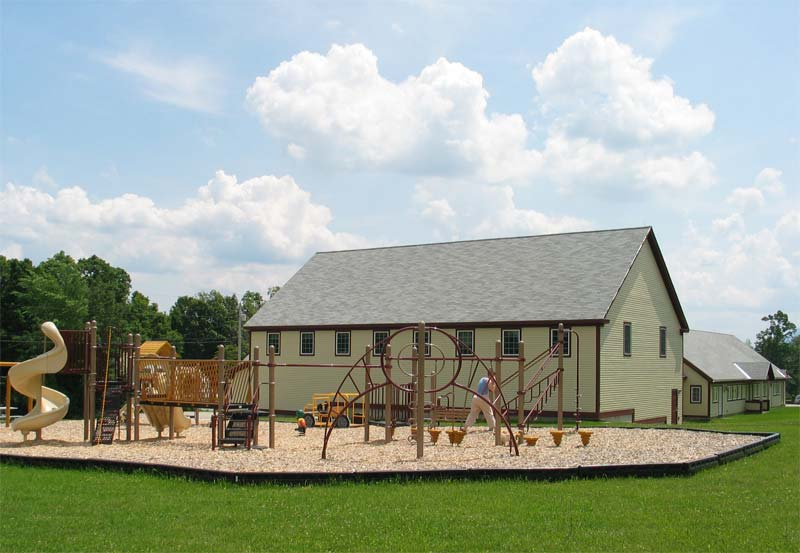
- Community center and elementary school in Tinmouth

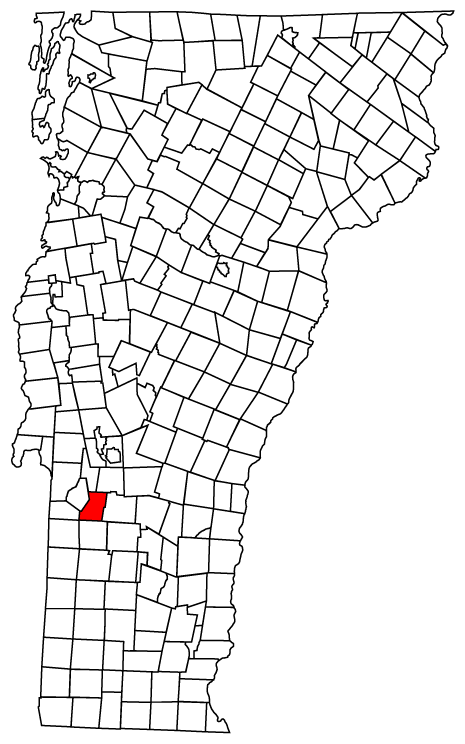
- Tinmouth, Vermont
- Coordinates: 43°26′41″N 73°03′28″W
- Country: United States
- State: Vermont
- County: Rutland
- Chartered: 1761
- Communities: Tinmouth; West Tinmouth

Area
  - Total: 28.4 sq mi (73.6 km^{2})
  - Land: 28.3 sq mi (73.3 km^{2})
  - Water: 0.12 sq mi (0.3 km^{2})
- Elevation: 1,424 ft (434 m)

Population (2020)
  - Total: 553
  - Density: 19.5/sq mi (7.54/km^{2})
- Time zone: UTC-5 (Eastern (EST))
  - Summer (DST): UTC-4 (EDT)
- ZIP Codes: 05773 (Tinmouth); 05777 (West Rutland); 05757 (Middletown Springs); 05774 (Wells); 05739 (Danby); 05761 (Pawlet)
- Area code: 802
- FIPS code: 50-72925
- GNIS feature ID: 1462227
- Website: tinmouthvt.gov

Tinmouth is a town in Rutland County, Vermont, United States. The population was 553 at the 2020 census.

== History ==
Tinmouth was established in 1761 in a region that came to be known as the New Hampshire Grants. At the first U.S. census, the town had a population of 935. Tinmouth's population peaked in 1820, and for the next 150 years the town's population gradually declined, reaching its lowest (268) in 1970. The town reached a population of 567 at the 2000 census, the first time since the 1880 census that it was above 500.

In early 2007 the citizens of Tinmouth undertook what turned into an "acrimonious" debate about switching from town meeting to the Australian ballot; two separate votes were held, both close, but ending in the decision to make the switch. The first vote was 97–95 in favor of the switch, the second was 112–104.

== Geography ==
According to the United States Census Bureau, the town has a total area of 28.4 square miles (74 km^{2}), of which 28.3 square miles (73 km^{2}) is land and 0.1 square miles (0.26 km^{2}), or 0.42%, is water.

According to one estimate, 40% of the town's land has been protected from development by conservation easements, which includes those held by the Vermont Land Trust and state land set aside in a to safeguard Tinmouth Channel, the Tinmouth Channel Wildlife Management Area; an additional 26% is acreage enlisted in the Vermont Land Use Tax program, which also limits development.

== Demographics ==
Historical population
Census	Pop.	Note	%±
1790	935		—
1800	973		4.1%
1810	1,001		2.9%
1820	1,069		6.8%
1830	1,049		−1.9%
1840	781		−25.5%
1850	717		−8.2%
1860	620		−13.5%
1870	589		−5.0%
1880	532		−9.7%
1890	435		−18.2%
1900	404		−7.1%
1910	410		1.5%
1920	349		−14.9%
1930	340		−2.6%
1940	346		1.8%
1950	248		−28.3%
1960	228		−8.1%
1970	268		17.5%
1980	406		51.5%
1990	455		12.1%
2000	567		24.6%
2010	613		8.1%
2020	553		−9.8%
U.S. Decennial Census

As of the census of 2000, there were 567 people, 231 households, and 167 families residing in the town. The population density was 20.0 people per square mile (7.7/km^{2}). There were 332 housing units at an average density of 11.7 per square mile (4.5/km^{2}). The racial makeup of the town was 96.83% White, 1.41% Native American, 0.35% Asian, 0.18% from other races, and 1.23% from two or more races. Hispanic or Latino of any race were 0.35% of the population.

There were 231 households, out of which 32.5% had children under the age of 18 living with them, 61.5% were married couples living together, 8.2% had a female householder with no husband present, and 27.7% were non-families. 23.8% of all households were made up of individuals, and 9.5% had someone living alone who was 65 years of age or older. The average household size was 2.45 and the average family size was 2.86.

In the town, the population was spread out, with 22.0% under the age of 18, 7.6% from 18 to 24, 29.3% from 25 to 44, 28.0% from 45 to 64, and 13.1% who were 65 years of age or older. The median age was 40 years. For every 100 females, there were 95.5 males. For every 100 females age 18 and over, there were 104.6 males.

The median income for a household in the town was $32,604, and the median income for a family was $34,792. Males had a median income of $25,313 versus $22,708 for females. The per capita income for the town was $16,583. About 7.6% of families and 11.1% of the population were below the poverty line, including 11.1% of those under age 18 and 20.7% of those age 65 or over.

== Education ==
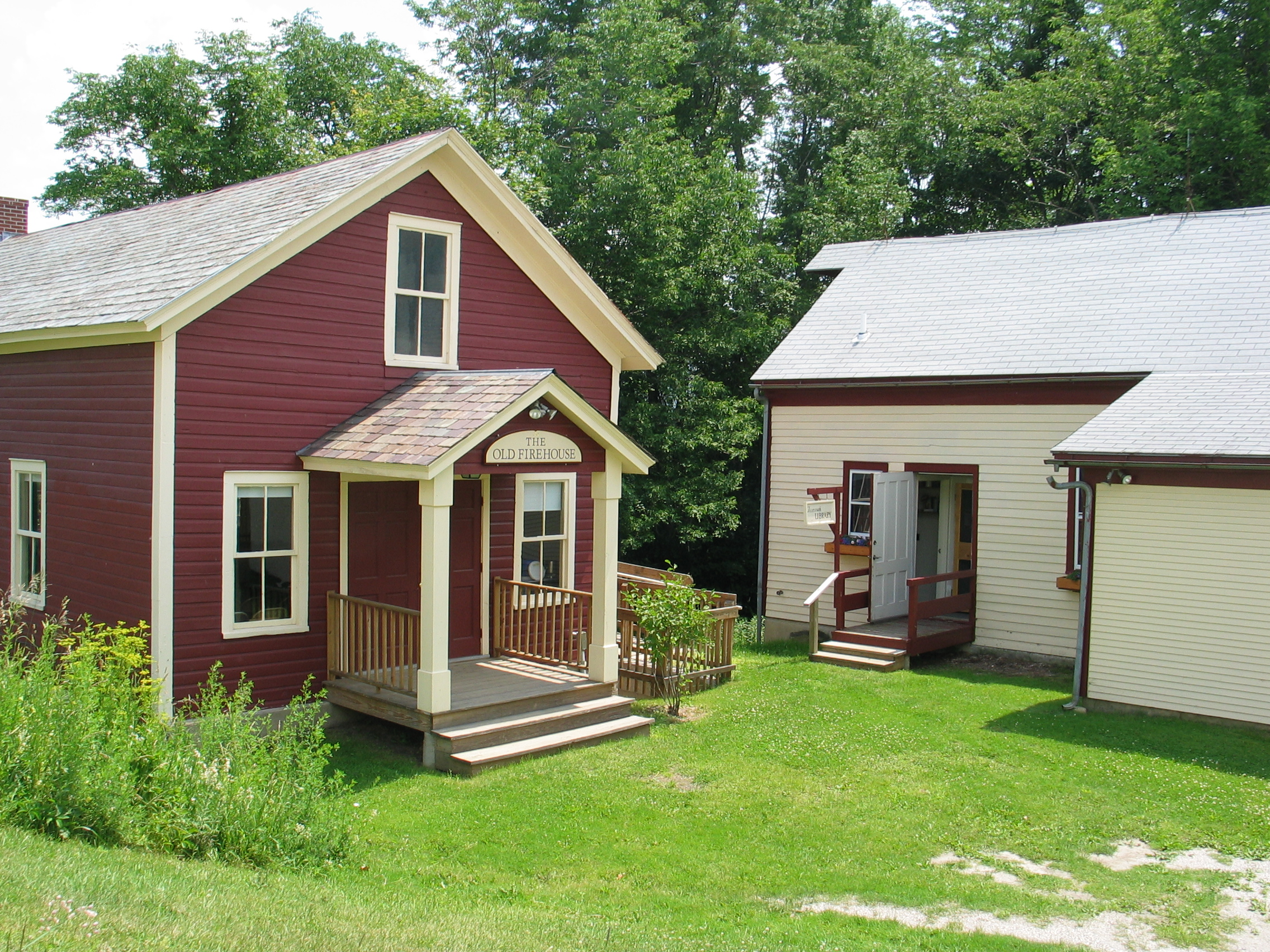
old fire house and library

The Tinmouth School had 54 children (Pre-K to grade 6) in 2008, with some grades sharing a classroom. Older students typically attend Mill River Middle School and Mill River Union High School.

Tinmouth is in the Mill River Unified Union School District, which includes areas formerly in the Rutland South Supervisory Union. Tinmouth formally switched to the Rutland South supervisory union from the Rutland Southwest supervisory union circa 2013. Prior to the school district merger Tinmouth residents could choose which high school to attend tuition-free, with the majority choosing Mill River. Post-merger residents are no longer permitted to attend independent high schools tuition-free.

== Notable people ==
- Nathaniel Chipman, US senator, federal judge, and chief justice of the Vermont Supreme Court
- John Mattocks, 16th governor of Vermont
- Samuel Mattocks, father of John Mattocks and Vermont State Treasurer
- Tom Peters, writer on business management practices
- Stephen Royce, 23rd governor of Vermont
- Bert L. Stafford, mayor of Rutland
