= Shrewsbury, Vermont =

- Town
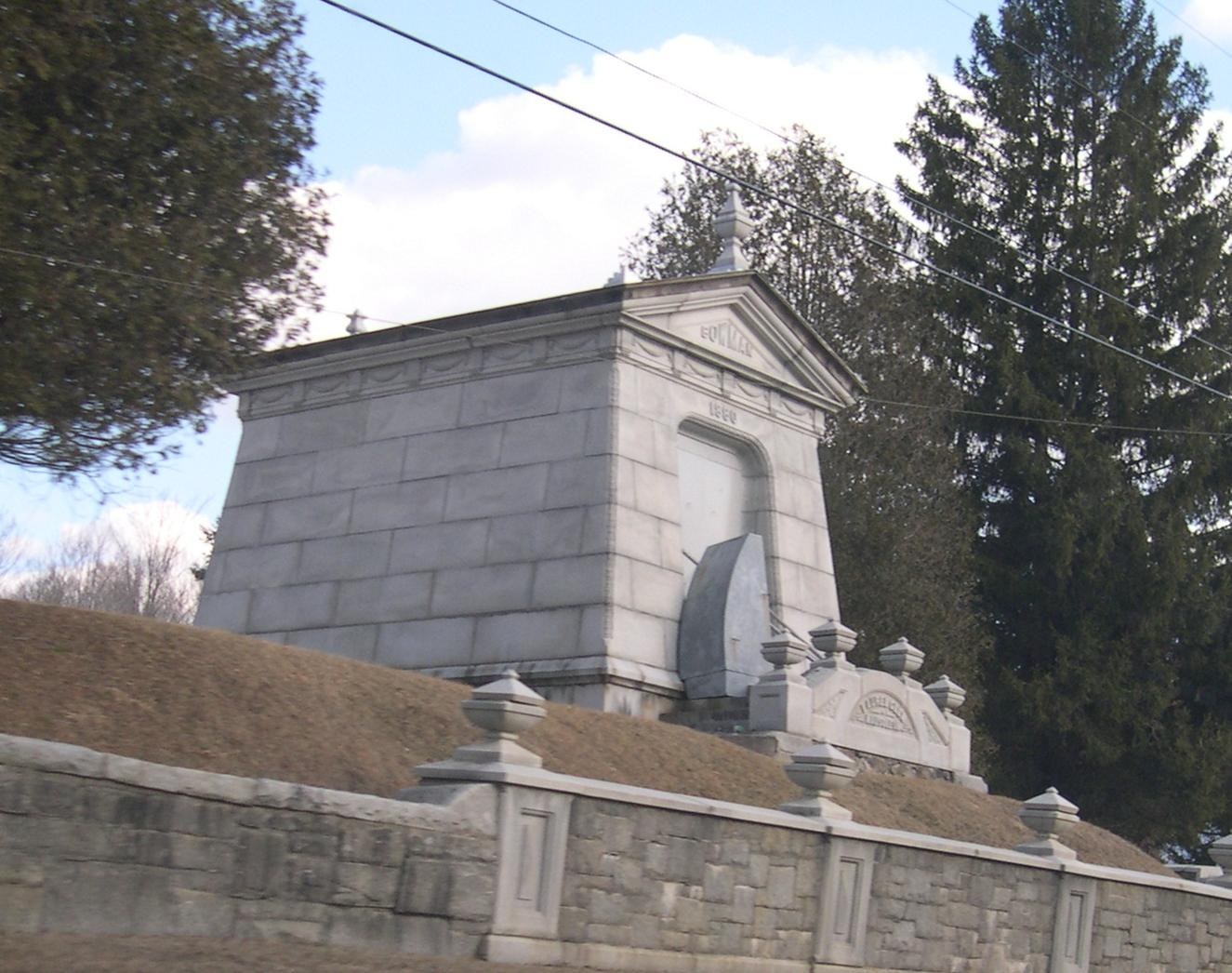
- The historic Laurel Glen Mausoleum in Shrewsbury

- Logo

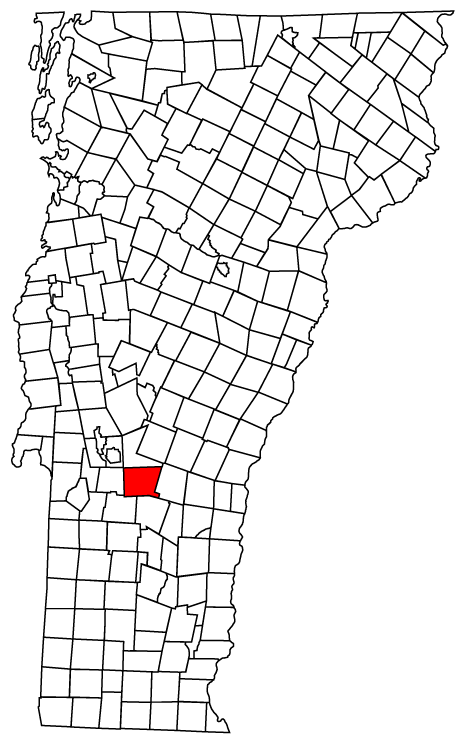
- Shrewsbury, Vermont
- Coordinates: 43°31′46″N 72°51′25″W
- Country: United States
- State: Vermont
- County: Rutland
- Communities: Cold River; Cuttingsville; North Shrewsbury; Shrewsbury

Area
  - Total: 50.2 sq mi (130.0 km^{2})
  - Land: 50.0 sq mi (129.6 km^{2})
  - Water: 0.15 sq mi (0.4 km^{2})
- Elevation: 1,591 ft (485 m)

Population (2020)
  - Total: 1,096
  - Density: 21.90/sq mi (8.457/km^{2})
- Time zone: UTC-5 (Eastern (EST))
  - Summer (DST): UTC-4 (EDT)
- ZIP code: 05738
- Area code: 802
- FIPS code: 50-65275
- GNIS feature ID: 1462210
- Website: www.shrewsburyvt.org

Shrewsbury is a town in Rutland County, Vermont, United States. The town was named for the Earl of Shrewsbury. The population was 1,096 at the 2020 census.

Shrewsbury was the home of the late U.S. Senator Jim Jeffords. In 1986/87, the town received worldwide attention from the media, when a moose spent 76 days unsuccessfully courting a local farmer's cow. A book, A Moose for Jessica was written about the story.

== Local culture ==
There are several local businesses. However, the vast majority of citizens work outside of the town, many in nearby Rutland.

The town has a small elementary school (Shrewsbury Mountain School), and the high school students attend Mill River Union High School in Clarendon.

The meetinghouse, located in Shrewsbury Center, houses the community church and is host to activities such as a talent show and contra dances. The fire department is made up of volunteers and is located in Cuttingsville. There is also a small volunteer library.

The town has a very low crime rate, with only occasional cases of vandalism or burglary. There were no murders in Shrewsbury since the 1880s until 2016.

== Geography ==
According to the United States Census Bureau, the town has a total area of 50.2 square miles (130 km^{2}), of which 50.1 square miles (130 km^{2}) is land and 0.1 square miles (0.26 km^{2}) is water. The Appalachian Trail/Long Trail crosses the town from southwest to northeast. Vermont Route 103 crosses the southwestern corner of the township.

== Demographics ==
Historical population
Census	Pop.	Note	%±
1790	383		—
1800	748		95.3%
1810	990		32.4%
1820	1,148		16.0%
1830	1,289		12.3%
1840	1,218		−5.5%
1850	1,268		4.1%
1860	1,175		−7.3%
1870	1,145		−2.6%
1880	1,235		7.9%
1890	974		−21.1%
1900	935		−4.0%
1910	751		−19.7%
1920	620		−17.4%
1930	540		−12.9%
1940	537		−0.6%
1950	464		−13.6%
1960	445		−4.1%
1970	570		28.1%
1980	866		51.9%
1990	1,107		27.8%
2000	1,108		0.1%
2010	1,056		−4.7%
2020	1,096		3.8%
U.S. Decennial Census

As of the census of 2000, there were 1,108 people, 426 households, and 322 families residing in the town. The population density was 22.1 people per square mile (8.5/km^{2}). There were 506 housing units at an average density of 10.1 per square mile (3.9/km^{2}). The racial makeup of the town was 98.29% White, 0.18% African American, 0.27% Asian, 0.90% from other races, and 0.36% from two or more races. Hispanic or Latino of any race were 1.26% of the population.

There were 426 households, out of which 32.6% had children under the age of 18 living with them, 64.3% were married couples living together, 7.7% had a female householder with no husband present, and 24.2% were non-families. 19.5% of all households were made up of individuals, and 5.4% had someone living alone who was 65 years of age or older. The average household size was 2.53 and the average family size was 2.90.

In the town, the population was spread out, with 24.0% under the age of 18, 5.1% from 18 to 24, 26.3% from 25 to 44, 32.3% from 45 to 64, and 12.3% who were 65 years of age or older. The median age was 43 years. For every 100 females, there were 98.9 males. For every 100 females age 18 and over, there were 93.6 males.

The median income for a household in the town was $48,472, and the median income for a family was $51,681. Males had a median income of $37,656 versus $25,125 for females. The per capita income for the town was $22,042. About 2.2% of families and 6.2% of the population were below the poverty line, including 4.7% of those under age 18 and 1.5% of those age 65 or over.

== Notable people ==
- Jim Jeffords, US senator
