= Weston (CDP), Vermont =

Census-designated place in Vermont, United States

Weston, Vermont
- Census-designated place
- Location within Vermont Location within the United States
- Coordinates: 43°17′26″N 72°47′35″W
- Country: United States
- State: Vermont
- County: Windsor
- Town: Weston

Area
  - Total: 0.19 sq mi (0.48 km^{2})
  - Land: 0.19 sq mi (0.48 km^{2})
  - Water: 0 sq mi (0.0 km^{2})
- Elevation: 1,296 ft (395 m)

Population (2020)
  - Total: 77
- Time zone: UTC-5 (Eastern (EST))
  - Summer (DST): UTC-4 (EDT)
- ZIP Code: 05161
- Area code: 802
- FIPS code: 50-81925
- GNIS feature ID: 2807172

Weston is the primary village and a census-designated place (CDP) in the town of Weston, Windsor County, Vermont, United States. As of the 2020 census, it had a population of 77, compared to 623 in the entire town.

The CDP is in the southwestern corner of Windsor County, south of the geographic center of the town of Weston, in the valley of the upper reaches of the West River, a south-flowing tributary of the Connecticut River. Vermont Route 100 is the main road through the community, leading north 10 miles (16 km) to Ludlow and south 5 miles (8 km) to Londonderry.
