= Wallingford (CDP), Vermont =

Census-designated place in Vermont, United States

Wallingford, Vermont
- Census-designated place
- Location within Vermont Location within the United States
- Coordinates: 43°28′33″N 72°58′01″W
- Country: United States
- State: Vermont
- County: Rutland

Area
  - Total: 1.7 sq mi (4.4 km^{2})
  - Land: 1.7 sq mi (4.4 km^{2})
  - Water: 0 sq mi (0.0 km^{2})
- Elevation: 807 ft (246 m)

Population (2010)
  - Total: 830
  - Density: 490/sq mi (190/km^{2})
- Time zone: UTC-5 (Eastern (EST))
  - Summer (DST): UTC-4 (EDT)
- ZIP Code: 05773
- Area code: 802
- FIPS code: 50-75850
- GNIS feature ID: 2378136

Wallingford is a census-designated place (CDP) in the Town of Wallingford, Rutland County, Vermont, United States. The population was 830 at the 2010 census.

== Geography ==
According to the United States Census Bureau, the CDP has a total area of 4.4 km^{2} (1.7 sq mi), all land.

== Demographics ==
As of the census of 2000, there were 948 people, 384 households, and 264 families residing in the CDP. The population density was 214.0 people/km^{2} (554 people/mi^{2}). There were 407 housing units at an average density of 91.9 units/km^{2} (238 units/mi^{2}). The racial makeup of the CDP was 98.95% White, 0.32% Asian, and 0.74% from two or more races. Hispanic or Latino of any race were 0.63% of the population.

There were 384 households, out of which 29.2% had children under the age of 18 living with them, 54.9% were married couples living together, 10.2% had a female householder with no husband present, and 31.3% were non-families. 26.3% of all households were made up of individuals, and 14.3% had someone living alone who was 65 years of age or older. The average household size was 2.44 and the average family size was 2.97.

In the CDP, the population was spread out, with 22.9% under the age of 18, 6.5% from 18 to 24, 27.0% from 25 to 44, 28.6% from 45 to 64, and 15.0% who were 65 years of age or older. The median age was 41 years. For every 100 females, there were 94.3 males. For every 100 females age 18 and over, there were 89.4 males.

The median income for a household in the CDP was $38,456, and the median income for a family was $46,938. Males had a median income of $30,500 versus $21,800 for females. The per capita income for the CDP was $17,699. About 2.6% of families and 5.3% of the population were below the poverty line, including 0.9% of those under age 18 and 16.9% of those age 65 or over.
