= Danby, Vermont =

- Town
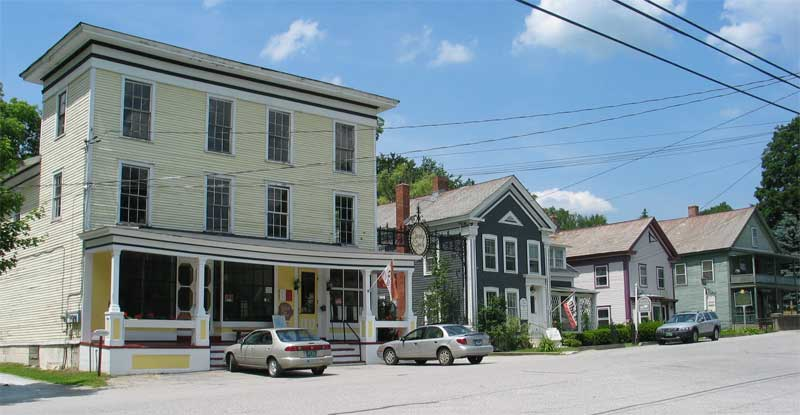
- Main Street in Danby

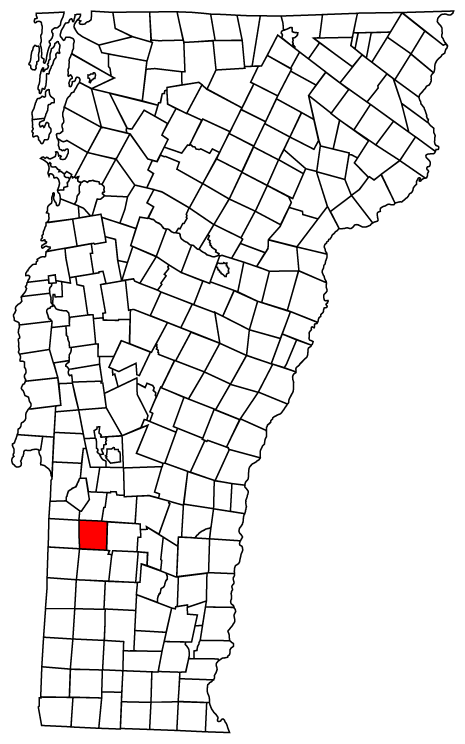
- Danby, Vermont
- Coordinates: 43°23′10″N 73°01′28″W
- Country: United States
- State: Vermont
- County: Rutland
- Communities: Danby; Danby Four Corners; Scottsville

Area
  - Total: 41.5 sq mi (107.6 km^{2})
  - Land: 41.4 sq mi (107.3 km^{2})
  - Water: 0.077 sq mi (0.2 km^{2})
- Elevation: 1,463 ft (446 m)

Population (2020)
  - Total: 1,284
  - Density: 30.99/sq mi (11.97/km^{2})
- Time zone: UTC-5 (Eastern (EST))
  - Summer (DST): UTC-4 (EDT)
- ZIP Codes: 05739 (Danby); 05761 (Pawlet)
- Area code: 802
- FIPS code: 50-16825
- GNIS feature ID: 1462079
- Website: www.danbyvt.org

Danby is a town in Rutland County, Vermont, United States. The population was 1,284 at the 2020 census.

== Etymology ==
According to the Vermont Encyclopedia, Danby was most likely named for Thomas Osborne, Earl of Danby and Duke of Leeds. However, Henry Gannett in 1905 attributed the town's name to Danby, North Yorkshire, in England. Historian Willard Sterne Randall, in his biography of Ethan Allen, gives yet another name origin: that Allen named Danby "after the French Naval commander whose fleet invaded New England's waters in the French and Indian War."

== Geography, geology, and landmarks ==
According to the United States Census Bureau, the town has a total area of 41.5 square miles (107 km^{2}), of which 41.4 square miles (107 km^{2}) is land and 0.1 square miles (0.26 km^{2}), or 0.22%, is water.

Most of the town lies in the Taconic Mountains; the eastern boundary of the town generally follows the course of Otter Creek in the narrow Valley of Vermont. The village of Danby lies along the eastern border of the town, on the west side of Otter Creek, and extends east into Mount Tabor.

Dorset Peak, part of the Taconic range, lies on the town's southern border and reaches an elevation of 3,804 feet (1,159 m). Danby quarry, located near the peak, opened in the early 20th century and is likely the world's largest underground marble quarry. It was reported in 2001 to have a total monthly output of about 1,200 tons of marble, half of which consists of Imperial Danby, a fine architectural marble with a variety of uses. Danby marble has been used in a number of notable buildings, including the United States Supreme Court building and the Jefferson Memorial.

== Demographics ==
Historical population
Census	Pop.	Note	%±
1790	1,206		—
1800	1,487		23.3%
1810	1,730		16.3%
1820	1,607		−7.1%
1830	1,362		−15.2%
1840	1,379		1.2%
1850	1,535		11.3%
1860	1,419		−7.6%
1870	1,319		−7.0%
1880	1,202		−8.9%
1890	1,084		−9.8%
1900	964		−11.1%
1910	1,001		3.8%
1920	1,007		0.6%
1930	1,070		6.3%
1940	1,112		3.9%
1950	990		−11.0%
1960	891		−10.0%
1970	910		2.1%
1980	992		9.0%
1990	1,193		20.3%
2000	1,292		8.3%
2010	1,311		1.5%
2020	1,284		−2.1%
U.S. Decennial Census

As of the census of 2000, there were 1,292 people, 502 households, and 362 families residing in the town. The population density was 31.2 people per square mile (12.0/km^{2}). There were 647 housing units at an average density of 15.6 per square mile (6.0/km^{2}). The racial makeup of the town was 98.53% White, 0.54% Native American, 0.23% Asian, and 0.70% from two or more races. 0.62% of the population were Hispanic or Latino of any race.

There were 502 households, out of which 33.3% had children under the age of 18 living with them, 58.6% were married couples living together, 9.2% had a female householder with no husband present, and 27.7% were non-families. 20.5% of all households were made up of individuals, and 8.8% had someone living alone who was 65 years of age or older. The average household size was 2.57 and the average family size was 2.96.

In the town, the population was spread out, with 25.5% under the age of 18, 7.7% from 18 to 24, 28.3% from 25 to 44, 25.4% from 45 to 64, and 13.2% who were 65 years of age or older. The median age was 37 years. For every 100 females, there were 106.7 males. For every 100 females age 18 and over, there were 103.0 males.

The median income for a household in the town was $37,137, and the median income for a family was $39,737. Males had a median income of $29,063 versus $20,795 for females. The per capita income for the town was $16,984. About 4.6% of families and 8.4% of the population were below the poverty line, including 9.8% of those under the age of 18 and 9.1% of those 65 and older.

== Notable people ==
- Pearl S. Buck, Nobel Prize-winning writer – lived in Danby and died there in 1973
- Luther Buxton, New York and Wisconsin legislator and physician
- Thomas Chittenden, First Governor of Vermont
- Asher Crispe, Orthodox Rabbi and technology futurist
- Silas L. Griffith, Vermont businessman and politician and First Vermont millionaire
- Henry D. Hitt, farmer, businessman, Wisconsin legislator
- Thomas Rowley, "poet of the Green Mountain Boys" – lived in Danby
- Nathan B. Smith, New York lawyer and politician
