= Area code 802 =

Telephone area code for all of Vermont

Coordinates: 44.33°N 72.50°W

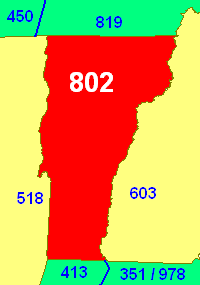
Vermont, and its 802 area code, in red

Area code 802 is a telephone area code in the North American Numbering Plan (NANP) for the U.S. state of Vermont. AT&T established the numbering plan area (NPA) for the entire state with one of the original area codes in October 1947 and it remains Vermont's only area code.

Vermont is among the eleven states with only one area code and 802 has become a source of pride in the state.

Prior to October 2021, area code 802 had telephone numbers assigned for the central office code 988. In 2020, 988 was designated nationwide as a dialing code for the National Suicide Prevention Lifeline, which created a conflict for exchanges that permit seven-digit dialing. This area code was therefore scheduled to transition to ten-digit dialing by October 24, 2021.

Exhaustion is not projected until 2072.

== Municipalities and central office codes ==
- Premium numbers: 976 (1+802 required)
- Addison: 759
- Albany: 209, 321, 755
- Alburgh: 796
- Arlington: 375, 379, 430
- Barnet: 357, 633
- Barre: 249, 272, 461, 476, 477, 479, 505, 522, 622, 661
- Barton: 239, 525, 569, 731
- Bellows Falls: 216, 289, 376, 428, 460, 463, 732
- Bennington: 440, 442, 445, 447, 654, 681, 733, 753
- Benson: 537
- Bethel: 234, 392
- Bloomfield: 962
- Bradford: 222, 449
- Brandon: 247, 465
- Brattleboro: 246, 251, 254, 257, 258, 275, 302, 380, 451, 490, 579, 689
- Bridgewater: 396, 672
- Bridport: 758
- Bristol: 453, 643
- Brookfield: 276, 541
- Burlington: 233, 238, 264, 304, 310, 318, 324, 338, 343, 350, 351, 355, 363, 373, 383, 391, 399, 419, 420, 448, 450, 488, 489, 495, 497, 503, 540, 542, 556, 557, 578, 598, 651, 652, 654, 655, 656, 657, 658, 660, 734, 735, 737, 777, 825, 829, 846, 847, 859, 860, 861, 862, 863, 864, 865, 881, 922, 923, 951, 985, 999
- Cabot: 563
- Canaan: 266, 354, 736
- Castleton: 468, 671
- Charlotte: 425, 539
- Chelsea: 625, 685
- Chester: 374, 875
- Concord: 284, 544, 695, 739
- Cornwall: 462
- Craftsbury: 586, 627
- Cuttingsville: 358, 492
- Danby: 293, 389
- Danville: 227, 684
- Derby: 766, 880
- Derby Line: 647, 873
- Dorset: 231, 384, 724, 867
- East Calais: 232, 456
- East Corinth: 439
- East Fairfield: 551, 664, 761, 827
- Enosburg Falls: 347, 933
- Essex Junction: 288, 316, 404, 662, 764, 769, 857, 871, 872, 876, 878, 879, 961
- Fairfax: 242, 849
- Fair Haven: 265, 278
- Fairlee: 331, 333, 407, 529
- Franklin: 285
- Grafton: 218, 843
- Grand Isle: 372, 378, 395
- Greensboro: 494, 533
- Groton: 575, 584
- Guildhall: 328
- Hardwick: 441, 472
- Hartland: 269, 436
- Hinesburg: 482, 799
- Hubbardton: 273
- Island Pond: 386, 515, 723
- Isle La Motte: 928
- Jacksonville: 368, 659
- Jamaica: 444, 874
- Jeffersonville: 335, 519, 644
- Johnson: 635, 696, 730
- Killington: 315, 422
- Lemington: 277
- Ludlow: 228, 975
- Lunenburg: 532, 892
- Lyndonville: 427, 626
- Maidstone: 676
- Manchester: 362, 366, 367, 549, 609, 688, 768
- Marshfield: 426
- Middlebury: 349, 377, 382, 385, 388, 398, 443, 458, 610, 771, 989
- Middletown Springs: 235, 271
- Milton: 559, 638, 891, 893
- Montgomery: 326
- Montpelier: 223, 224, 225, 229, 262, 279, 371, 498, 552, 595, 613, 778, 793, 826, 828, 830, 839, 854, 917
- Morgan: 648, 895
- Morrisville: 521, 851, 888
- Mount Holly: 259, 298
- Newbury: 243, 866
- Newfane: 221, 365, 618
- Newport: 323, 334, 487, 624, 673
- Northfield: 485
- North Troy: 327, 988
- Norton: 435, 822
- Norwich: 526, 649
- Orleans: 754, 755
- Orwell: 948
- Panton: 475
- Pawlet: 268, 325
- Peacham: 592
- Perkinsville: 263, 795
- Pittsfield: 729, 746
- Pittsford: 483, 725
- Plainfield: 322, 454, 821
- Poultney: 287, 884
- Pownal: 823, 949
- Proctor: 267, 459, 499
- Proctorsville: 226, 554
- Putney: 387, 536
- Randolph: 431, 565, 705, 728
- Reading: 245, 484, 952
- Readsboro: 423
- Richford: 255, 848
- Richmond: 329, 336, 434
- Rochester: 767, 967
- Rupert: 394, 944
- Rutland: 236, 270, 282, 337, 342, 345, 353, 417, 558, 665, 683, 712, 747, 756, 770, 772, 773, 774, 775, 776, 779, 786, 855
- St. Albans: 309, 370, 393, 524, 527, 528, 582, 713, 752, 782
- St. Johnsbury: 274, 424, 473, 535, 714, 745, 748, 751
- Salisbury: 352, 898
- Saxtons River: 344, 869
- Shelburne: 425, 482, 985
- Shoreham: 897
- South Londonderry: 297, 548, 787, 824, 856
- South Royalton: 330, 587, 763, 788, 831
- South Strafford: 765, 794
- Springfield: 591, 692, 885, 886
- Stamford: 694, 750
- Stowe: 253, 585, 760, 798, 904
- Swanton: 466, 868
- Thetford: 727, 785
- Troy: 715, 744
- Tunbridge: 693, 889
- Underhill: 858, 899
- Vergennes: 812, 870, 877
- Waitsfield: 496, 583
- Wallingford: 414, 446
- Wardsboro: 631, 896
- Washington: 589, 883
- Waterbury: 241, 244, 560, 806, 882
- Weathersfield: 546, 674, 263, 885
- Wells: 294, 566, 645, 783
- Wells River: 588, 757
- West Burke: 467, 553
- West Newbury: 429
- West Rutland: 438
- Westminster: 518, 721, 722
- Weybridge: 545, 926
- Whiting: 623
- White River Junction: 240, 250, 280, 281, 283, 290, 291, 295, 296, 299, 356, 359, 369, 452, 478, 547, 555, 698, 741, 742, 749
- Williamstown: 433, 455
- Williamsville: 348
- Wilmington: 319, 339, 464, 780, 789, 908
- Windsor: 230, 674, 738, 909
- Woodstock: 332, 432, 457

Vermont area codes: 802
	North: 819/873	
West: 518/838	802	East: 603
	South: 413	
Massachusetts area codes: 413, 508/774, 617/857, 781/339, 978/351
New Hampshire area codes: 603
New York area codes: 212/332/646, 315/680, 363/516, 518/838, 585, 607, 631/934, 624/716, 347/718/929, 329/845, 914, 917
Quebec area codes: 367/418/581, 354/450/579, 263/438/514, 468/819/873
