= Wallingford, Vermont =

- Town
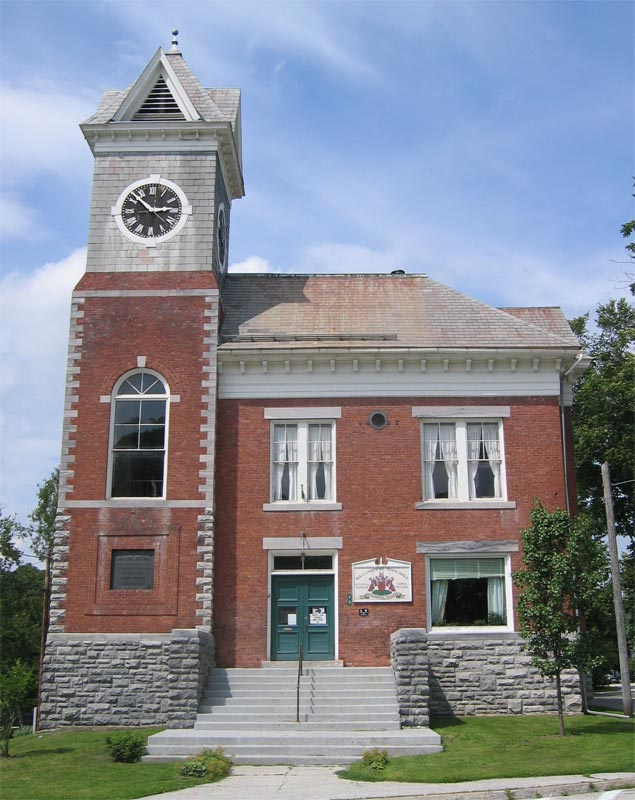
- Wallingford town offices

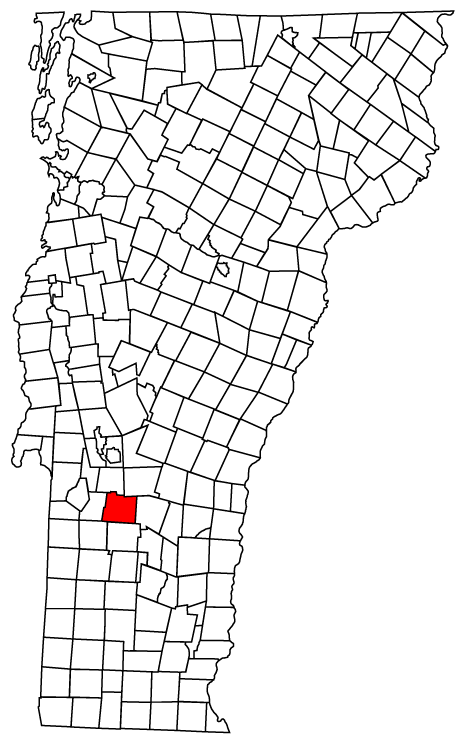
- Wallingford, Vermont
- Coordinates: 43°26′25″N 72°56′49″W
- Country: United States
- State: Vermont
- County: Rutland
- Communities: Wallingford; East Wallingford; South Wallingford

Area
  - Total: 43.4 sq mi (112.5 km^{2})
  - Land: 43.2 sq mi (112.0 km^{2})
  - Water: 0.19 sq mi (0.5 km^{2})
- Elevation: 2,136 ft (651 m)

Population (2020)
  - Total: 2,129
  - Density: 49.23/sq mi (19.01/km^{2})
- Time zone: UTC-5 (Eastern (EST))
  - Summer (DST): UTC-4 (EDT)
- ZIP Codes: 05773 (Wallingford); 05742 (East Wallingford)
- Area code: 802
- FIPS code: 50-75925
- GNIS feature ID: 1462239
- Website: www.wallingfordvt.com

Wallingford is a town in Rutland County, Vermont, United States. The population was 2,129 at the 2020 census. Wallingford also contains the villages of East Wallingford and South Wallingford.

== Geography ==
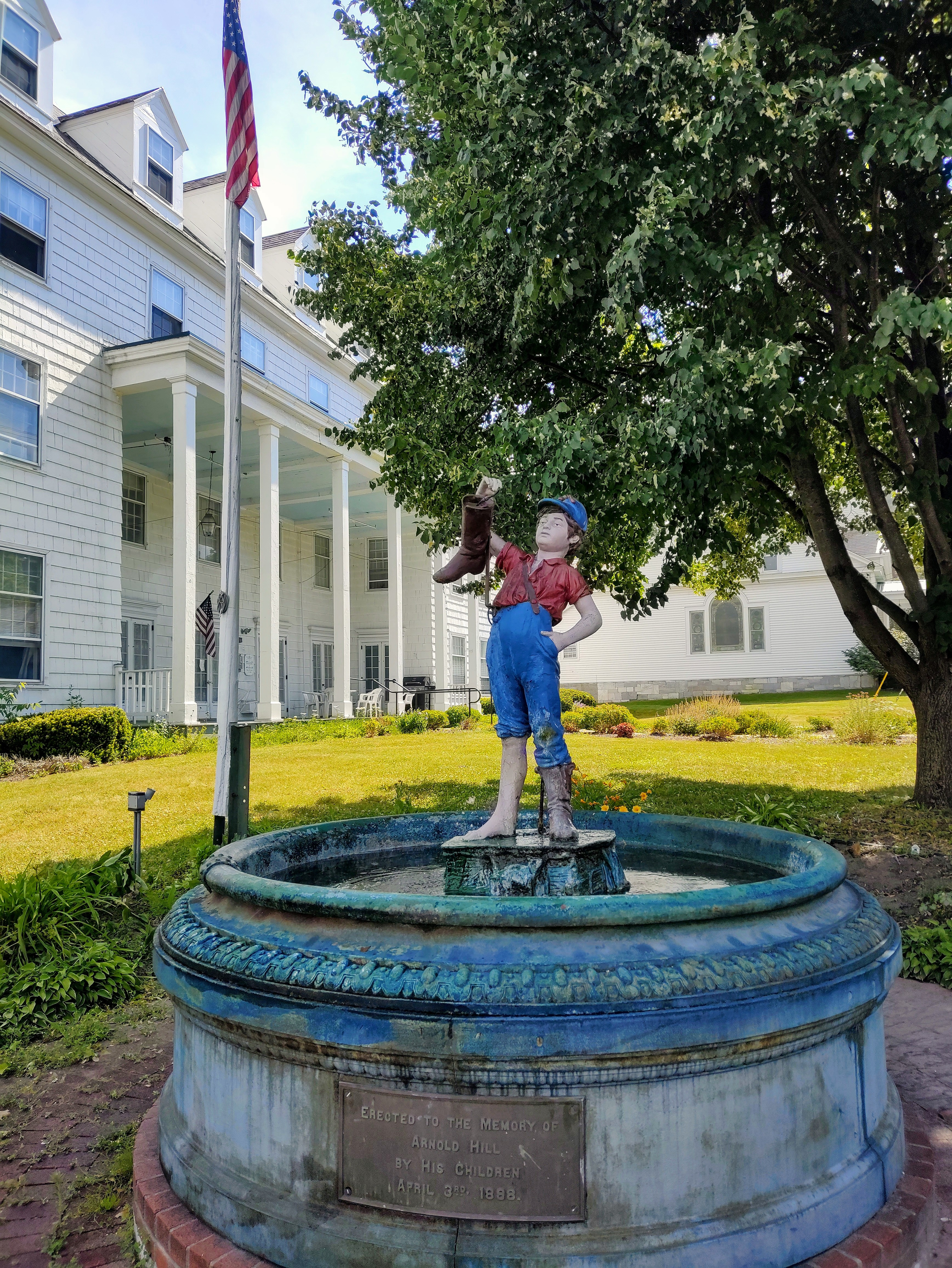
A fountain statue of a young boy with a leaky boot in Wallingford, Vermont.

According to the United States Census Bureau, the town has a total area of 43.5 square miles (113 km^{2}), of which 43.2 square miles (112 km^{2}) is land and 0.2 square miles (0.52 km^{2}), or 0.48%, is water.

== Demographics ==
Historical population
Census	Pop.	Note	%±
1790	536		—
1800	912		70.1%
1810	1,386		52.0%
1820	1,570		13.3%
1830	1,740		10.8%
1840	1,608		−7.6%
1850	1,688		5.0%
1860	1,747		3.5%
1870	2,023		15.8%
1880	1,846		−8.7%
1890	1,733		−6.1%
1900	1,575		−9.1%
1910	1,719		9.1%
1920	1,581		−8.0%
1930	1,564		−1.1%
1940	1,450		−7.3%
1950	1,482		2.2%
1960	1,439		−2.9%
1970	1,676		16.5%
1980	1,893		12.9%
1990	2,184		15.4%
2000	2,274		4.1%
2010	2,079		−8.6%
2020	2,129		2.4%
U.S. Decennial Census

At the 2000 census there were 2,274 people, 905 households, and 651 families in the town. The population density was 52.6 people per square mile (20.3/km^{2}). There were 1,040 housing units at an average density of 24.1 per square mile (9.3/km^{2}). The racial makeup of the town was 98.86% White, 0.13% Black or African American, 0.22% Asian, 0.04% Pacific Islander, 0.04% from other races, and 0.70% from two or more races. Hispanic or Latino of any race were 0.53%.

Of the 905 households 30.8% had children under the age of 18 living with them, 59.0% were married couples living together, 9.1% had a female householder with no husband present, and 28.0% were non-families. 22.9% of households were one person and 10.6% were one person aged 65 or older. The average household size was 2.49 and the average family size was 2.92.

The age distribution was 23.4% under the age of 18, 5.8% from 18 to 24, 27.0% from 25 to 44, 30.3% from 45 to 64, and 13.7% 65 or older. The median age was 42 years. For every 100 females, there were 96.2 males. For every 100 females age 18 and over, there were 94.1 males.

The median household income was $42,417 and the median family income was $47,007. Males had a median income of $33,162 versus $24,141 for females. The per capita income for the town was $19,570. About 3.8% of families and 5.9% of the population were below the poverty line, including 5.1% of those under age 18 and 11.4% of those age 65 or over.

== Notable people ==
- Ella Maria Ballou, educator, stenographer
- Samuel T. Douglass, Michigan Supreme Court justice
- Paul P. Harris, lawyer and founder of Rotary International
- Matthew Lyon, lawyer, soldier, and United States Representative-Kentucky and Vermont
- Daniel Roberts, attorney
