= Vermont Route 153 =

State highway in Bennington and Rutland counties in Vermont, US

Vermont Route 153
- Map of western Vermont with VT 153 highlighted in red

Route information
- Maintained by the towns of Rupert and Pawlet
- Length: 13.14 mi (21.15 km)
- Existed: May 1, 1961–present

Major junctions
- West end: CR 153 at Salem, NY
- East end: VT 30 in Pawlet

Location
- Country: United States
- State: Vermont
- Counties: Bennington, Rutland

Highway system
- State highways in Vermont
← VT 149	→ VT 155

Vermont Route 153 (VT 153) is a state highway in southwestern Vermont in the United States. It extends for 13.14 miles (21.15 km) from the New York state line at Rupert to VT 30 in Pawlet. VT 153 is entirely town-maintained and goes through Bennington and Rutland counties.

== Route description ==
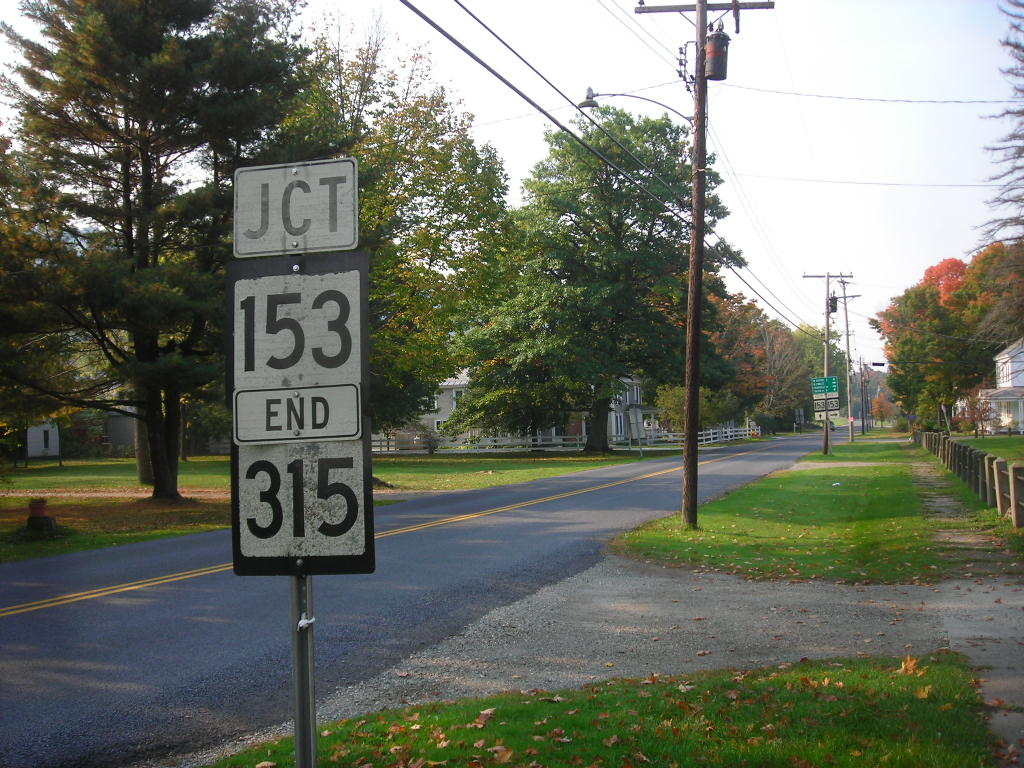
Junction of VT 153 and VT 315 in Rupert, Vermont. (This assembly was replaced sometime between 2008 and 2012.)

VT 153 begins at the state line adjacent to Washington County, New York, where it connects to County Route 153 (CR 153, formerly New York State Route 153 or NY 153) in the Rupert Valley. The route heads to the northeast, passing through the village of West Rupert, which is located northeast of the Big Ridge, a 2,000-foot-high (610 m) mountain. Route 153 progresses farther, passing Oak Hill and turning at an intersection with VT 315 at Meetinghouse Hill. Route 153 then heads northward, intersecting local roads and parallelling the state border. Highgo Hill is passed to the west, and is only accessible via Chef Clark Road.

Route 153 then edges closer to the state border, entering West Pawlet. There are a few connector roads to New York county roads and NY 22 on the other side of the border. Route 153 passes some of ponds and crosses the Mettawee River. The river parallels Route 153 for the rest of its length until its terminus at VT 30 in Pawlet. VT 149 is just to the north of this intersection.

== History ==
The entirety of VT 153 was assigned in May 1961 to match up with the recently designated NY 153.

== Major intersections ==
County	Location	mi	km	Destinations	Notes
Bennington	Rupert	0.00	0.00	CR 153 (Salem Rupert Road) – Salem	Continuation into New York
Bennington	Rupert	2.95	4.75	VT 315 east – Dorset, Manchester	Western terminus of VT 315
Rutland	Pawlet	13.14	21.15	VT 30 – Wells, Poultney, Pawlet, Manchester	Eastern terminus
1.000 mi = 1.609 km; 1.000 km = 0.621 mi
