= New York State Route 149 =

Highway in New York and Vermont

Route 149
- Route 149 highlighted in red

Route information
- Maintained by NYSDOT (NY 149) and VTrans (VT 149)
- Length: 33.50 mi (53.91 km): NY 149: 32.20 mi; VT 149: 1.302 mi
- History: NY 149 assigned 1930; VT 149 designated VT 30B in 1935; renumbered to VT 149 in December 1966

Major junctions
- West end: I-87 / US 9 in Queensbury
- US 4 in Fort Ann; NY 22 near Granville
- East end: VT 30 in Pawlet, VT

Location
- Country: United States
- State: New York
- Counties: Warren, Washington, Rutland (VT)

Highway system
- New York Highways; Interstate; US; State; Reference; Parkways
- State highways in Vermont
← NY 148	NY 149	→ NY 150
← VT 147	VT 149	→ VT 153
← VT 30A	VT 30B	→ VT 31

New York State Route 149 (NY 149) is an east–west state highway that runs for 32.20 miles (51.82 km) through the Capital District of New York in the United States. It begins at exit 20 on the Adirondack Northway (Interstate 87 or I-87) in the Warren County town of Queensbury and intersects U.S. Route 9 (US 9), US 4, and NY 22, among other routes, as it progresses eastward to its eastern end at the Vermont state line in the Washington County village of Granville. Here, the highway becomes Vermont Route 149 (VT 149) and continues for an additional 1.302 miles (2.095 km) to an intersection with VT 30 in Rutland County. Both NY 149 and VT 149 traverse mostly rural areas.

NY 149 was assigned in the 1930 renumbering of state highways in New York and initially extended from NY 9L in Queensbury to NY 22 south of Granville by way of an east–west highway built during the first two decades of the 20th century. It was cut back to US 4 c. 1939, but extended westward back to NY 9L in the mid-1950s. It was extended further west to US 9 in the late 1950s and to I-87 exit 20 c. 1962. In the mid-1960s, NY 22 was rerouted to bypass Granville to the west. NY 149 was then extended to Vermont by way of NY 22's former routing into the village and East Main Street. The short continuation of Granville's East Main Street in Vermont, designated as Vermont Route 30B since 1935, was renumbered to VT 149 in December 1966 to match the New York number.

== Route description ==
=== Queensbury and Fort Ann ===
NY 149 officially begins at exit 20 on the northbound Adirondack Northway (I-87) in the town of Queensbury, from where it follows a ramp eastward to US 9. As signed, however, NY 149 begins at the southbound portion of I-87 exit 20 and follows County Route 23 (CR 23, named Gurney Lane) east to US 9, where it turns to follow US 9 northward. The signed and official routings join at the exit's northbound ramps. While concurrent with US 9, NY 149 passes the Adirondack/Lake George Factory Outlet Mall and several other businesses located on both sides of the highway. At the end of the factory outlets in the hamlet of French Mountain, NY 149 turns off US 9 and proceeds in a generally eastward direction toward the village of Fort Ann.

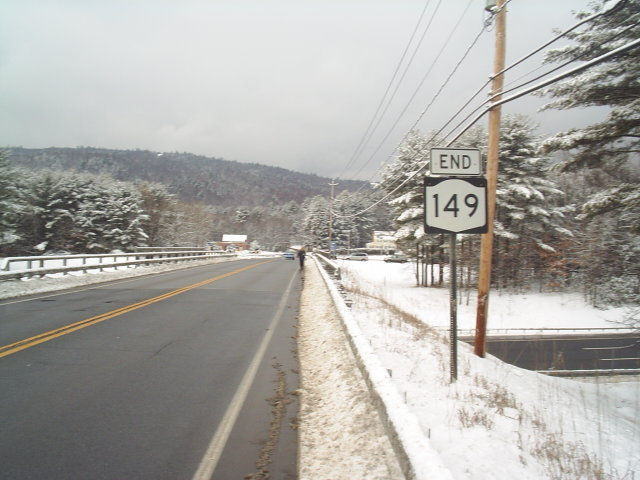
NY 149's signed western terminus along Gurney Lane (CR 23) in Queensbury. NY 149 officially ends further north in Queensbury

After passing under a bike path overpass and a recreational vehicle park, the route runs through an area of rural residential dwellings and wooded areas situated north of Glen Lake. At the northern tip of the lake, NY 149 intersects Oxbow Hill Road, a connector to CR 63 (Moon Hill Road) that is maintained by Warren County despite not being a numbered Warren County route. East of this junction, the highway turns to the northeast and crosses the Blue Line into Adirondack Park ahead of an intersection with CR 7 (Bay Road). NY 149 continues on, curving back to the east as it passes the Queensbury Country Club and meets NY 9L. The route enters Washington County and the town of Fort Ann roughly 0.5 miles (0.8 km) later.

The first several miles of NY 149 in Washington County pass through isolated, rural areas as it curves to the north and south while following a generally east–west alignment. In West Fort Ann, the only community along the route between the county line and the village of Fort Ann, NY 149 intersects with Old State Route 149, a loop route of NY 149 that was created when the highway was realigned. The route continues east from the community, exiting Adirondack Park and crossing over Halfway Creek on its way into the village of Fort Ann, where it becomes Ann Street. Within the village, NY 149 passes the Fort Ann Cemetery and two blocks of homes before intersecting with US 4 at George Street. NY 149 turns to the south, joining US 4 along George Street through downtown Fort Ann. After passing the town park, US 4 and NY 149 leave the village and become nameless as they head south into the town of Kingsbury.

=== East of Fort Ann ===
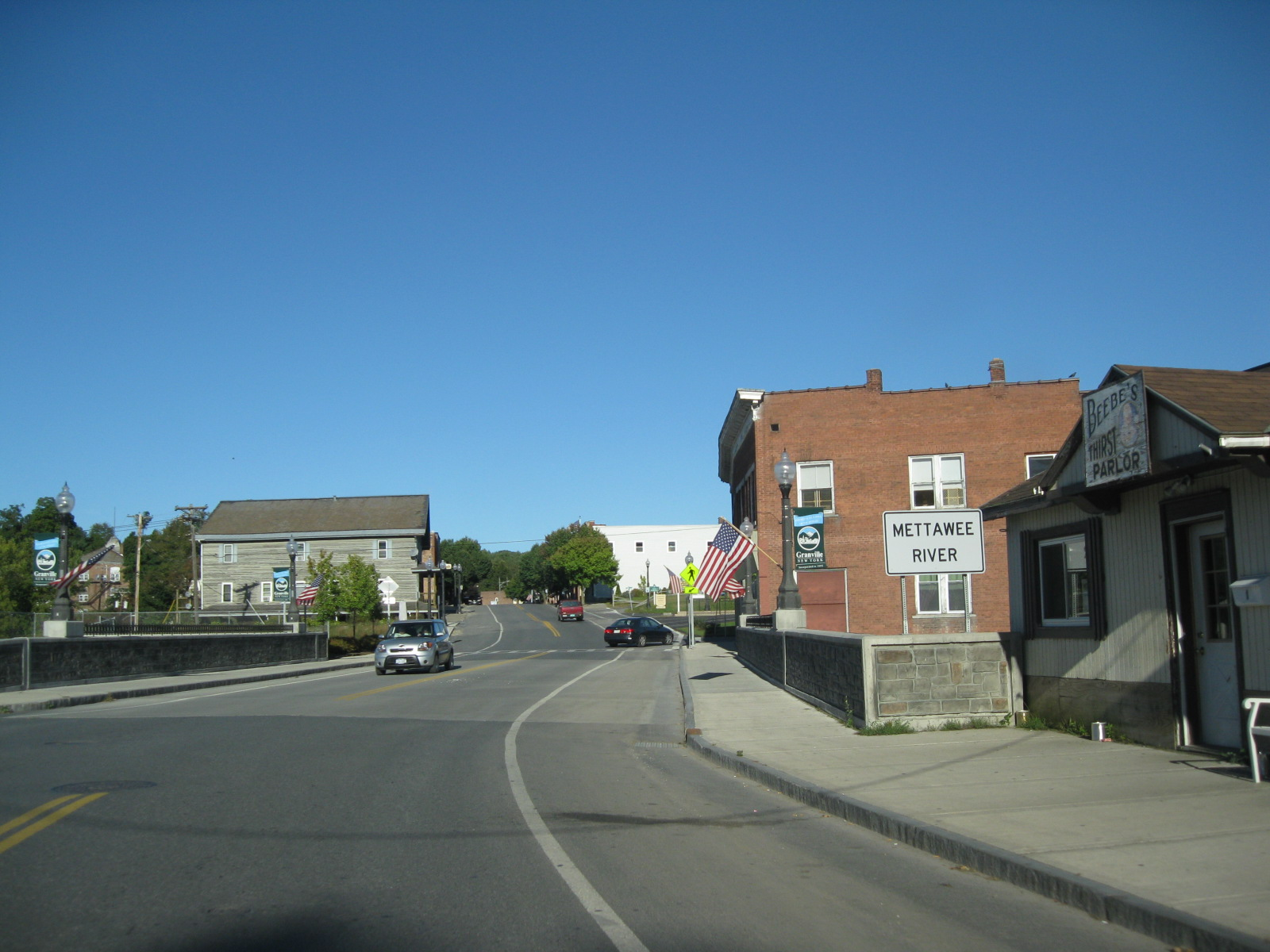
NY 149 crossing the Mettawee River in Granville. This bridge replaced an older span in 2006

In Kingsbury, US 4 and NY 149 head through an open area dotted with farms and ponds. The routes proceed southward to a junction known as Baldwin Corner, where US 4 and NY 149 split. While US 4 heads to the southeast, NY 149 continues due south, paralleling the Champlain Canal to an area known as Smith's Basin. Here, NY 149 turns east and crosses both a railroad line and the canal—which NY 149 had been following since joining US 4 in downtown Fort Ann—to enter the town of Hartford. Here, the route winds its way eastward through a rural, mostly undeveloped area of Washington County as it intersects several county roads on its way to the hamlet of Hartford.

In Hartford, NY 149 intersects both Christian Hill Road and CR 23 (the main street of the community) ahead of a junction with NY 40 south of the community. The two routes converge here as NY 149 follows NY 40 northward around the small community to a junction east of the hamlet's center, where NY 149 turns off to the east and begins to pass through more rural areas of the town of Hartford and the adjacent town of Granville. Upon crossing into Granville, the open areas along the route give way to dense forests. NY 149 continues generally northeastward through the town, passing through the isolated hamlet of Hillsdale before curving to the southeast toward South Granville. At the center of the community, NY 149 turns to the northeast at an intersection with CR 27 and CR 28.

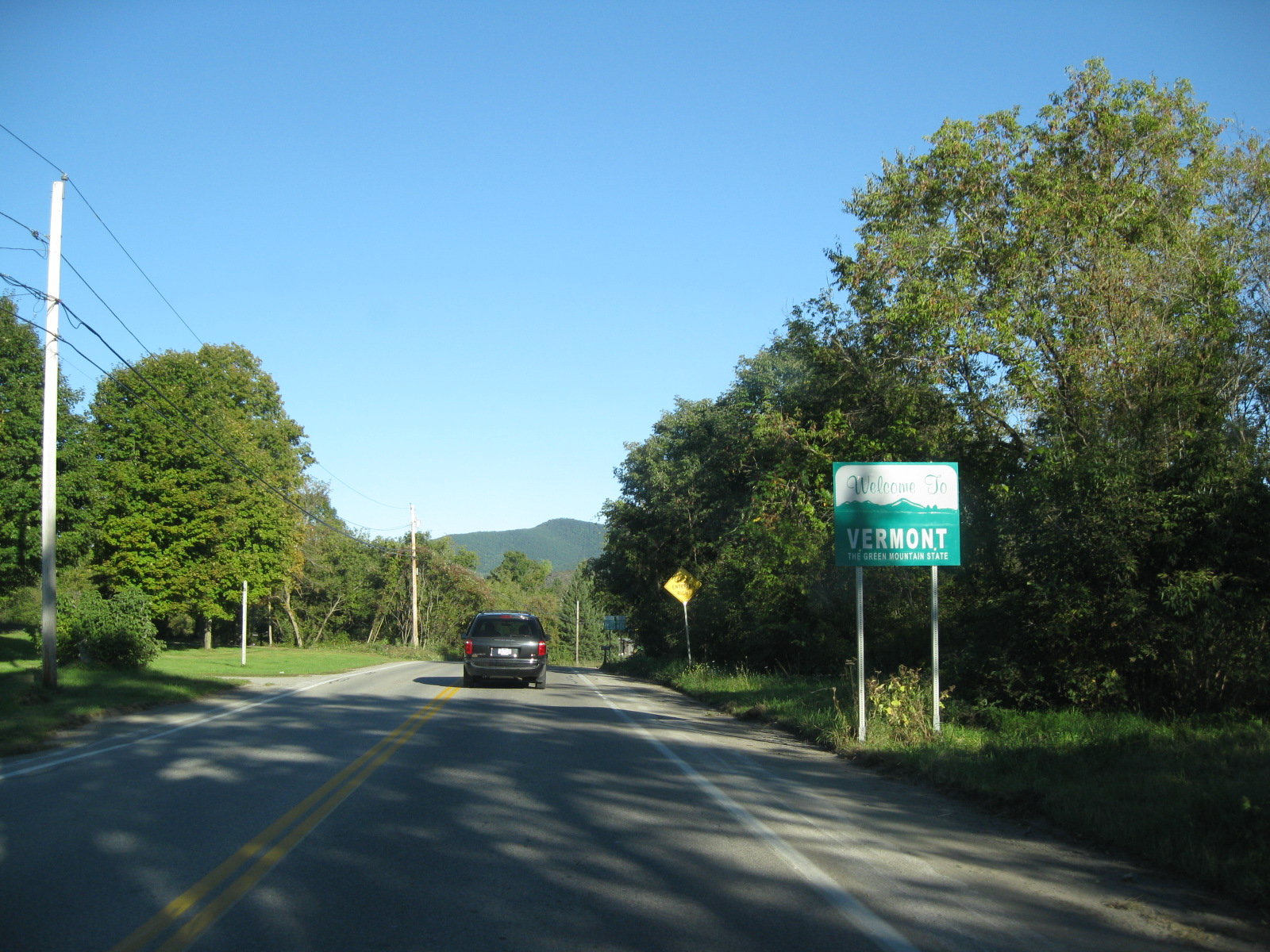
NY 149 at the Vermont state line, marking the transition to VT 149

The route leaves South Granville, passing patches of trees and a smattering of homes as it heads toward the border village of Granville. Just south of the village limits, NY 149 intersects with NY 22. NY 22 and NY 149 briefly overlap before NY 22 forks off to bypass Granville to the west. NY 149 continues into Granville, becoming Quaker Street upon entering the village limits. The route proceeds through the village to its center, where NY 149 forks northeastward onto West Main Street and crosses over the Mettawee River. At an intersection with Church Street (CR 26), NY 149 becomes East Main Street and turns to the southeast on its way to the Vermont state line, where the roadway becomes VT 149.

VT 149 heads southeastward away from the built up village of Granville into a more rural region of the Rutland County town of Pawlet, paralleling the Mettawee River as it progresses onward. It heads past homes and through a dense forest as it intersects with Bull Frog Hollow Road just after the border. After Bull Frog Hollow Road, the route proceeds eastward through an area dominated by quarries. VT 149 continues on, entering a more open area and passing only a few homes before ending at an intersection with VT 30 in Blossom Corners, a small, largely unpopulated community within the town of Pawlet.

== History ==
=== State takeover and improvements ===
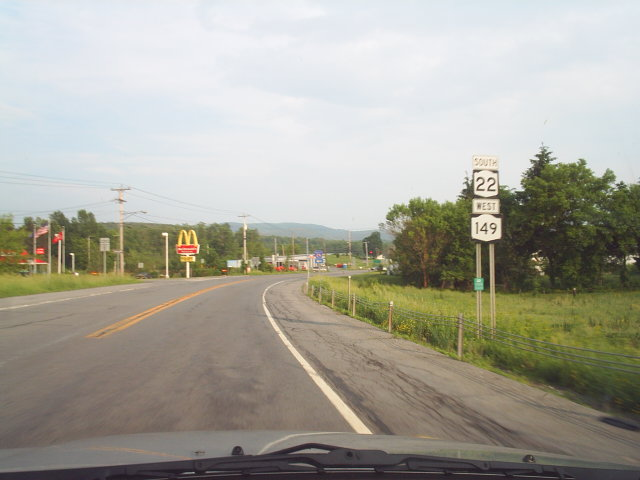
Signage along the NY 22 / NY 149 concurrency in Granville

Several portions of NY 149 were constructed during the early 20th century when the state of New York assumed ownership over thousands of highways across the state. The earliest known constructed portion of modern NY 149 is the segment between the southern end of the NY 22 overlap and the southern village limits of Granville. The state let a $10,850 (equivalent to $394,314 in 2024) contract to improve the highway, legislatively designated as part of State Highway 104 (SH 104), on May 12, 1902. The highway was added to the state highway system on October 6, 1902, following the completion of the project. The portion of NY 149 that overlaps US 9 in Queensbury, designated as part of SH 417, was improved under the terms of a $82,700 (equivalent to $2.79 million in 2024) contract awarded on July 10, 1906. It was added to the state highway system on January 10, 1907.

Other portions of modern NY 149 were constructed over the course of the next decade. In 1911, work began on the section of current NY 149 between Smith's Basin and the northern junction with NY 40 in Hartford. The contract for the portion in the town of Fort Ann (SH 942) was let on June 15 while the contract for the section in Hartford (SH 802) was awarded three months earlier on March 30. The two projects were carried out simultaneously over the next two years. SH 802 was added to the state highway system on February 9, 1914, while SH 942 was included in the system on May 5, 1914. In all, the improvement of the two state highways cost $69,577.20 (equivalent to $2.18 million in 2024).

In 1913, construction began on the portion of what is now NY 149 in Granville south of North Street, internally designated as SH 5404. The $77,684.89 (equivalent to $2.44 million in 2024) contract was awarded on September 5, 1913. The necessary improvements were made over the course of the next year and the highway was incorporated into the state highway system on October 29, 1914. The last portion of NY 149 with a known construction date is the section concurrent to US 4 in Fort Ann (part of SH 1224). A contract for its improvement was let on January 8, 1915 at a cost of $43,778.92 (equivalent to $1.27 million in 2024). The improvements were made over the next year and the roadway was added to the state highway system on January 10, 1916.

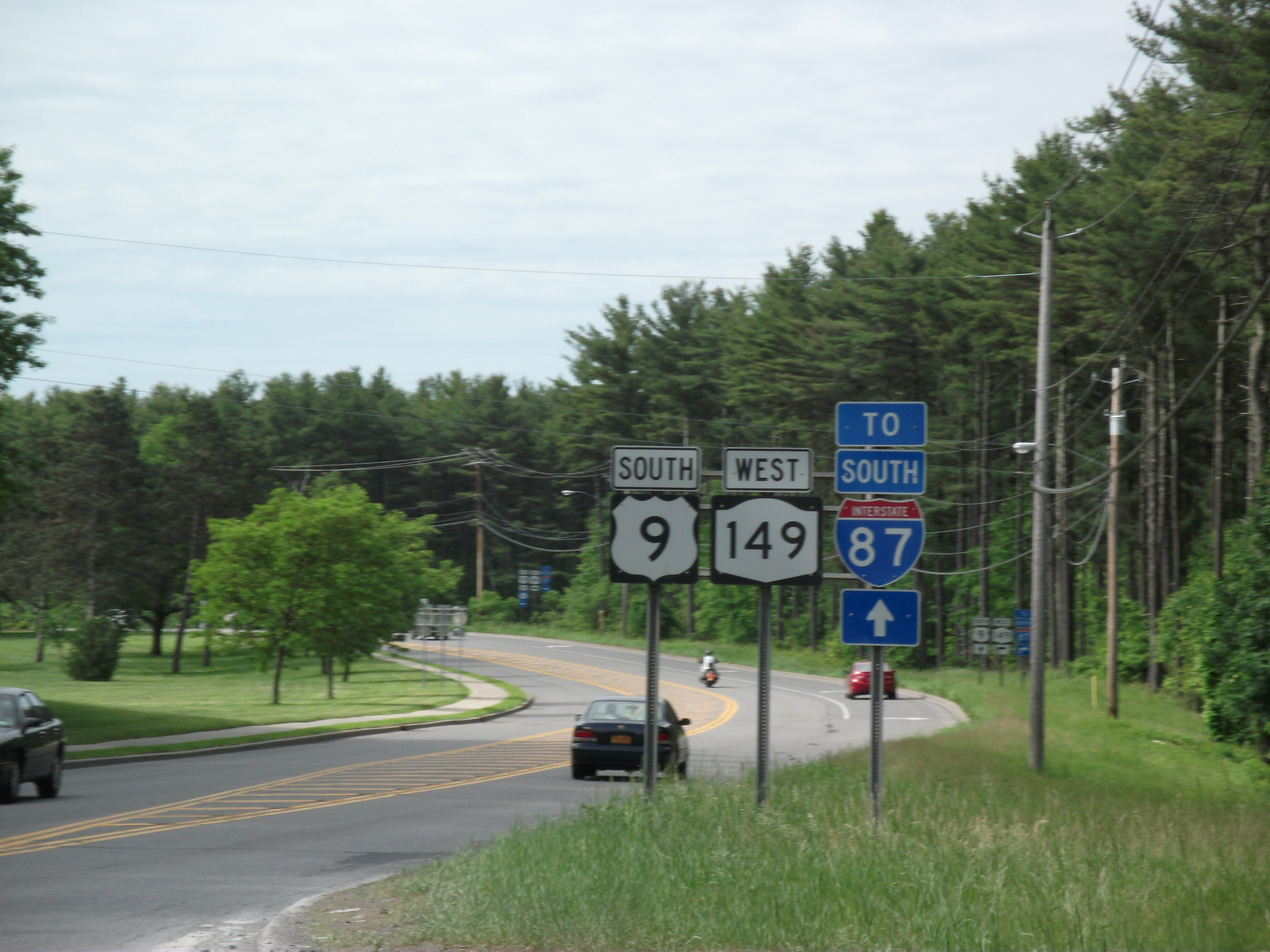
NY 149 and US 9 signage through Queensbury

When the first set of New York state routes were assigned in 1924, SH 417 became part of NY 6 while SH 104 and SH 5404 were included in NY 24 and SH 1224 was designated as part of NY 30. NY 6 was replaced by US 9 while NY 30 was co-designated as US 4 between Glens Falls and Whitehall in 1927 following the creation of the U.S. Highway System in late 1926. The remainder of modern NY 149 was unnumbered prior to 1930.

=== Assignment and alignment changes ===
In the 1930 renumbering of state highways in New York, the NY 30 designation was reassigned elsewhere, leaving just US 4 on the portion of highway that US 4 now shares with NY 149. At the same time, all of NY 24 south of Middle Granville became part of NY 22 while NY 149 was assigned to the portion of its modern alignment between NY 9L in Queensbury and NY 22 south of the village of Granville. In July 1935, several floods devastated many highways in the state of New York. One highway affected was NY 149, as a bridge carrying the highway in the hamlet of South Granville was washed out. With the bridge out, drivers were detoured onto a town highway (now maintained by Washington County as CR 27) to access NY 22 and Granville from South Granville and to access NY 40 from Granville. NY 22 was also affected by the flood as a bridge in the town of Cambridge was washed out as well.

NY 149 was truncated eastward c. 1939 to the southern terminus of its overlap with US 4 south of Fort Ann. The change lasted for roughly 15 years before the highway was reextended westward to NY 9L in the mid-1950s. It was extended again in the late 1950s to follow a pre-existing, unnumbered roadway west to US 9 in the Queensbury hamlet of French Mountain. NY 149 was altered once more c. 1962 to meet the new I-87 at exit 20, resulting in a short overlap with US 9.

Map of the overlap between NY 149 and US 9 and NY 149's western terminus

In Granville, NY 22 was originally routed on Quaker, Main, and North streets. It was rerouted in the mid-1960s to bypass Granville on a new highway west of the village. NY 149 was then extended northward along NY 22's former routing to the junction of Main and North streets in Granville. From there, it continued eastward on Main Street to reach the Vermont state line, where it connected to VT 30B, a spur route of VT 30 that had been in place since 1935. Vermont renumbered VT 30B to VT 149 in December 1966 to match the highway it now connected to in New York.

=== Other developments ===
On July 2, 2005, the Hadlock Pond Dam north of West Fort Ann failed, washing out four sections of NY 149 near that community. As a result, the portion of the route between NY 9L in Queensbury and US 4 in Fort Ann was closed to all traffic. After one week, the highway was reopened, but only for local traffic and construction crews. It was reopened to all traffic on July 24. The impromptu repair project cost the New York State Department of Transportation (NYSDOT) $1.5 million (equivalent to $2.41 million in 2024).

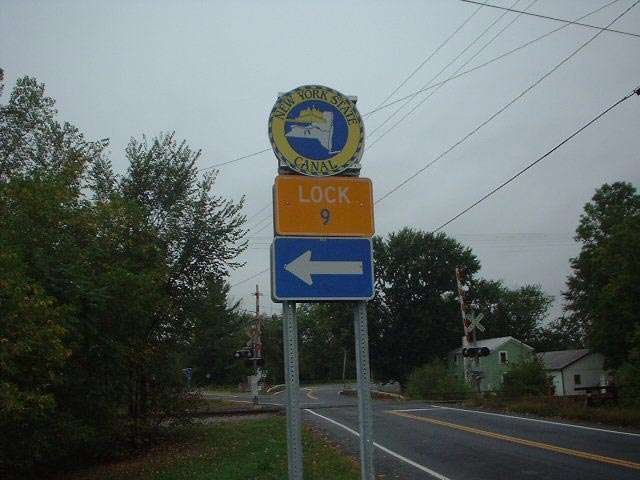
Signage for Champlain Canal Lock 9 along NY 149 in Smith's Basin

In 2007, the Times Union of Albany received letters from readers requesting that all of NY 149 be widened from two to four lanes. The letters were forwarded to NYSDOT, who responded that although the route was an important recreational route between New York and Vermont, the amount of traffic that the route carries was not high enough to warrant a four-lane divided highway. Additionally, the state would also have to take a significant number of properties along the roadway in order to widen it, which would affect the character of the area.

On July 10, 2008, a tanker truck full of water crashed into a tree along a portion of NY 149 between Bay Road (CR 7) and Ridge Road (NY 9L) that features a sharp curve. After the first accident occurred at 3:10 a.m., a second tractor-trailer, who had stopped because of the tanker, rolled in reverse, jackknifing across the road and hitting a car. The road was shut down for the accident, where the driver of the tanker was taken to Glens Falls Hospital. The drivers of the car and the tractor-trailer that jackknifed were not hurt. The route was reopened by 11:40 a.m. This accident was one of many tractor-trailer accidents that has occurred on this stretch of NY 149.

NY 149 between Martindale Road in the town of Queensbury and the Washington County line was upgraded by New York State Department of Transportation (NYSDOT) in the late 2000s. Construction began on February 9, 2009, to upgrade the 2.75 miles (4.43 km) long segment. The project consisted of repaving the roadway in areas, but also included widening the shoulder to 6 feet (1.8 m) wide, reconstructing and straightening NY 149 near Martindale Road along with a spot near the Queensbury Country Club. Culverts would be replaced, drainage systems would be upgraded and they would create a new wetland mitigation area aside of NY 149. Finally, left turn lanes would be constructed at NY 9L and CR 7 (Bay Road). Announced alongside of a project to reconstruct NY 372, the project would cost $8 million (2009 USD) and given to Kubricky Construction Corporation, based in Queensbury, with a slated completion date of June 2010. However, by July 2010, construction had not been completed, as they just had shut down NY 149 between NY 9L and CR 7.

On December 19, 2012, NYSDOT announced a project to reconstruct NY 149 and its junction with US 4 in Fort Ann. The project would upgrade the intersection by doing an overall expansion, requiring the condemnation of one property. This new widening would help make turns from US 4 south to NY 149 west. The intersection would be repaved and drainage basins on US 4 and NY 149, which would tie into the system on Clay Hill Road. NYSDOT's website notes that announced that bids of the new project were announced in Fall 2013 with construction beginning soon after. The slated date of completion for the $1.3 million project would be in Fall 2014.

== Major intersections ==
State	County	Location	mi	km	Destinations	Notes
New York	Warren	Queensbury	0.00	0.00	I-87 south (Adirondack Northway) / CR 23 (Gurney Lane) to CR 58 (West Mountain Road) – Saratoga Springs, Albany	Western terminus; Western terminus of NY 149/CR 23 overlap; exit 20 (I-87)
New York	Warren	Queensbury	0.14	0.23	US 9 south – Glens Falls	Southern terminus of US 9 / NY 149 overlap; Eastern terminus of NY 149/CR 23 overlap
New York	Warren	Queensbury	0.30	0.48	I-87 north (Adirondack Northway) – Plattsburgh, Montreal	Exit 20 (I-87)
New York	Warren	Queensbury	0.64	1.03	US 9 north – Lake George	Northern terminus of US 9 / NY 149 overlap; hamlet of French Mountain
New York	Warren	Queensbury	5.36	8.63	NY 9L (Ridge Road) – Lake George, Glens Falls	
New York	Washington	Village of Fort Ann	12.60	20.28	US 4 north (George Street) – Whitehall, Rutland VT	Northern terminus of US 4 / NY 149 overlap
New York	Washington	Kingsbury	14.46	23.27	US 4 south – Hudson Falls	Southern terminus of US 4 / NY 149 overlap; hamlet of Baldwin Corner
New York	Washington	Hartford	22.58	36.34	NY 40 south – Argyle	Western terminus of NY 40 / NY 149 overlap
New York	Washington	Hartford	22.93	36.90	NY 40 north – West Granville	Eastern terminus of NY 40 / NY 149 overlap
New York	Washington	Town of Granville	30.48	49.05	NY 22 south – Salem	Southern terminus of NY 22 / NY 149 overlap
New York	Washington	Town of Granville	30.55	49.17	NY 22 north – Middle Granville	Northern terminus of NY 22 / NY 149 overlap
New York–Vermont state line			32.20 0.000	51.82 0.000	Roadway becomes NY 149 westbound and VT 149 eastbound	
Vermont	Rutland	Pawlet	1.302	2.095	VT 30 – Wells, Poultney, Pawlet, Manchester	Eastern terminus
1.000 mi = 1.609 km; 1.000 km = 0.621 mi: Concurrency terminus
