= Jenks Tavern =

- U.S. National Register of Historic Places
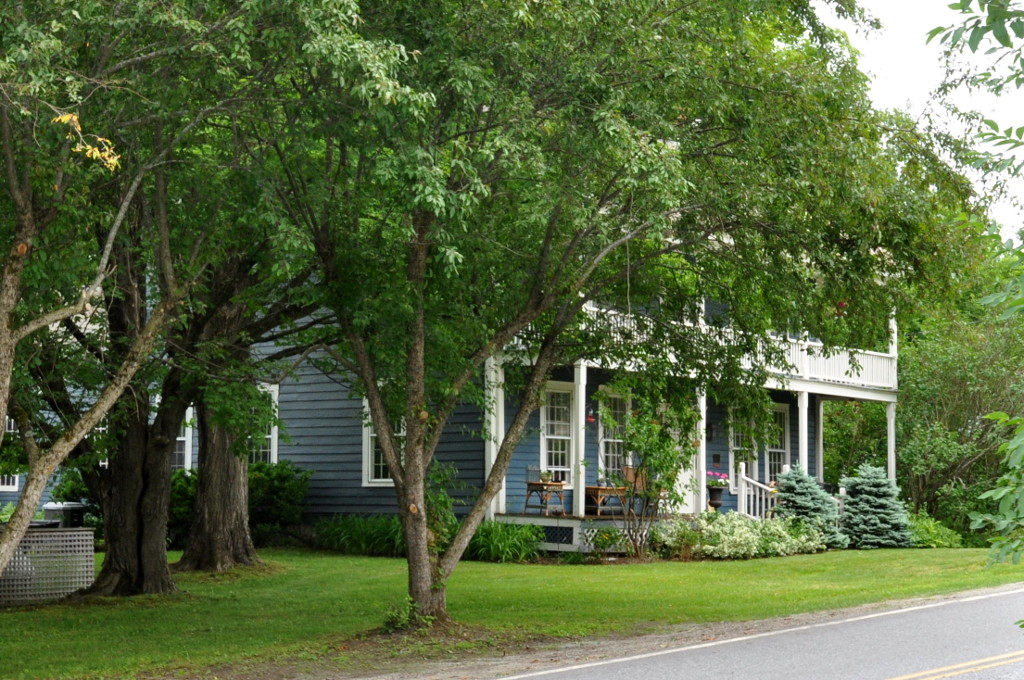

- Location within Vermont Location within the United States
- Location: Jct. of Dorset West Rd. and VT 315, Rupert, Vermont
- Coordinates: 43°16′20″N 73°7′35″W
- Area: less than one acre
- Built: 1807
- Architectural style: Federal
- NRHP reference No.: 94000191
- Added to NRHP: March 17, 1994

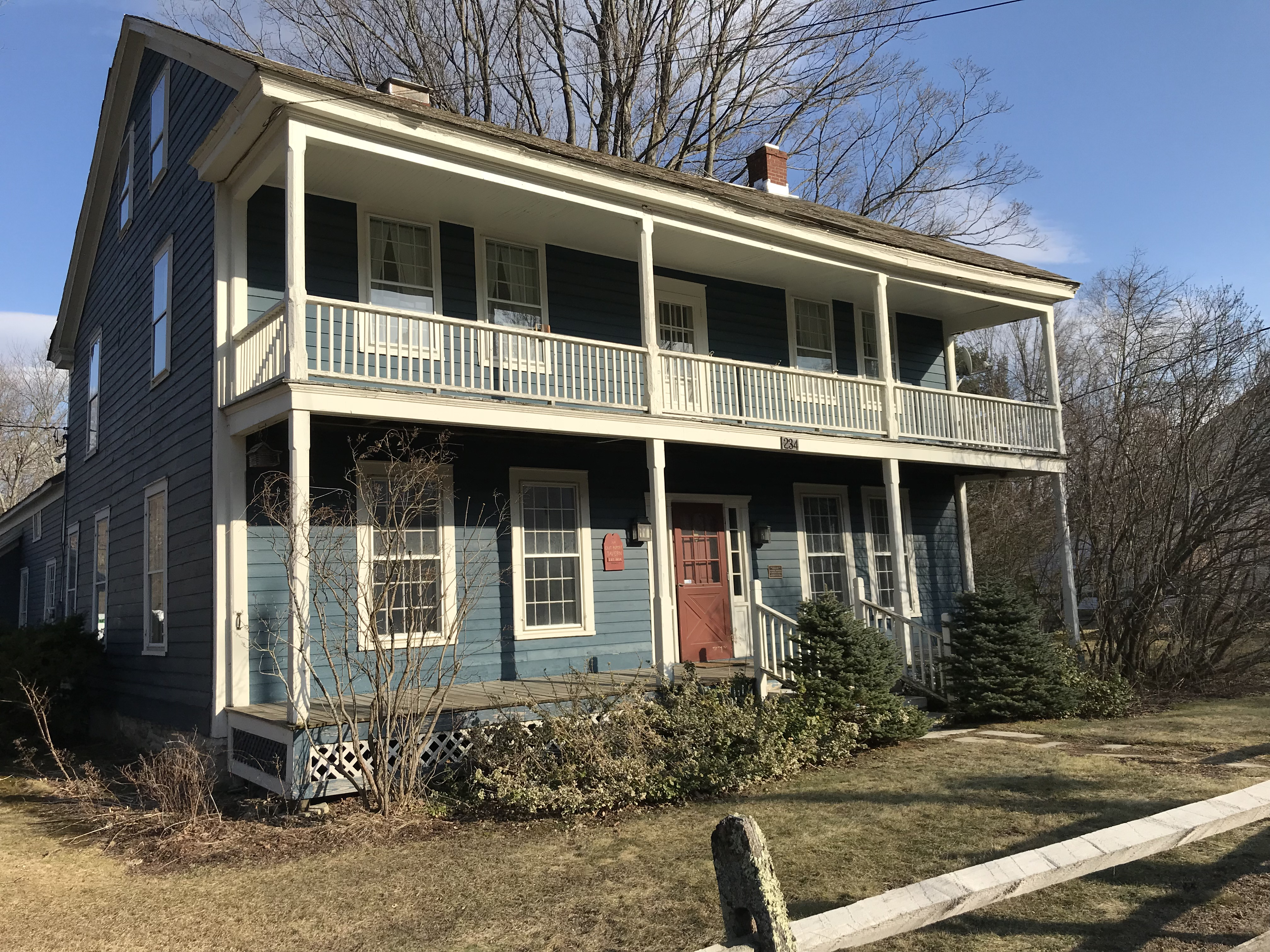
Exterior of Jenks Tavern facing Dorset West Road.

The Jenks Tavern, also known historically as the East Rupert Hotel and the Hotel G. Jenks, is a historic public accommodations house at the junction of West Dorset Road with Vermont Routes 315 and 30 in Rupert, Vermont. Built about 1807, it is a well-preserved example of an early 19th-century traveler's accommodation in southern Vermont. It was listed on the National Register of Historic Places in 1994. The building is now a private residence, the home of American playwright and author John Nassivera.

== Description and history ==
The former Jenks Tavern is located in the village of East Rupert, overlooking the Mettawee River not far from the town line with Dorset. The tavern stands on a roughly 1-acre (0.40 ha) parcel bounded on the north by Rupert Mountain Road (Vermont Route 315), the east by Vermont Route 30, and the west by West Dorset Road. The building is oriented facing west. It is a 2 1/2-story wood-frame structure, with a gabled roof, clapboard siding, and a stone foundation. A single-story ell extends to the rear (toward Route 30). The main facade is covered by a two-story porch, and is five bays wide with doors at the center of each level. Windows are double-hung sash throughout, with a pair of windows in the gables at the sides. The interior follows a typical center hall plan, with a large sprung floor ballroom on the attic level.

The tavern was built about 1807 by James Moore, Jr., and was originally attached to an older tavern building that has since been torn down. His purchase and construction were occasioned by the completion of the Rupert Turnpike (now roughly Vermont 315), which connected Pawlet, Vermont and Salem, New York. It was also originally attached to a barn, which was demolished in 1948 when Route 30 was realigned. The building was regularly (but not continuously) in use as a traveler's accommodation, and was widely known in the region for the high quality of the dance floor in its ballroom. This type of tavern was once common in southwestern Vermont, but this is now one of a few little-altered examples to survive. It has been either vacant or a private residence since the 1930s.

== See also ==
- National Register of Historic Places listings in Bennington County, Vermont
