= Vermont Route 133 =

State highway in Rutland County, Vermont, US

Vermont Route 133
- Horace Greeley Memorial Highway
- Map of Rutland County in western Vermont with VT 133 highlighted in red

Route information
- Maintained by VTrans
- Length: 22.476 mi (36.172 km)
- Existed: May 1, 1960–present

Major junctions
- South end: VT 30 in Pawlet
- North end: VT 4A in West Rutland

Location
- Country: United States
- State: Vermont
- Counties: Rutland

Highway system
- State highways in Vermont
← VT 132	→ VT 139

Vermont Route 133 (VT 133) is a 22.476-mile-long (36.172 km) north–south state highway in Rutland County, Vermont, United States. It runs from VT 30 in Pawlet in the south to VT 4A in West Rutland in the north.

== Route description ==
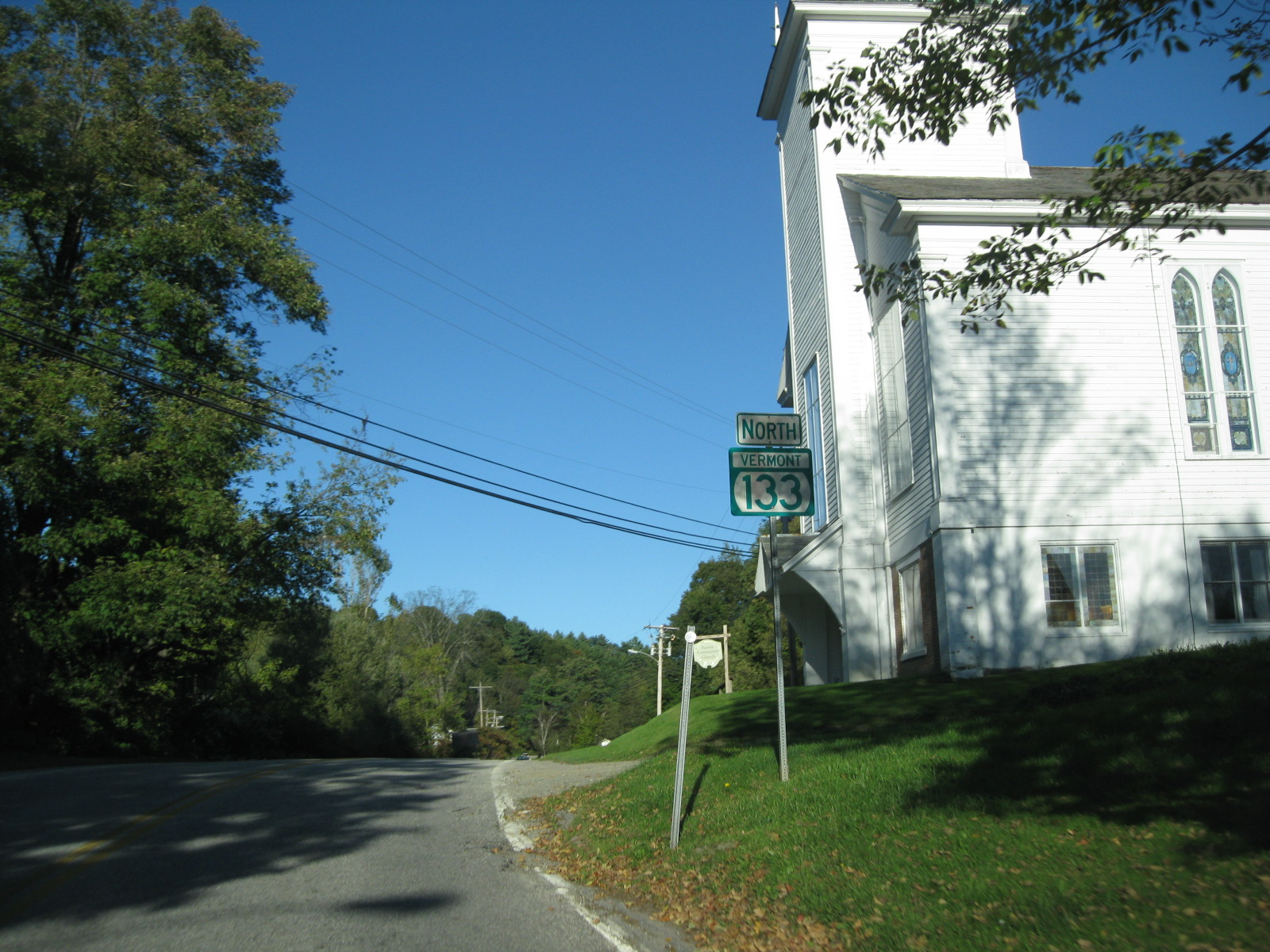
VT 133 heading northbound through Pawlet

VT 133 begins at an intersection with VT 30 in the Rutland County town of Pawlet. Running eastward along Danby–Pawlet Road, VT 133 parallels the Flower Brook through a residential stretch. Turning northeast, the route soon turns north off Danby–Pawlet Road and run north through the rural areas of Pawlet. VT 133 soon begins to wind northeast through Pawlet, soon crossing into the town of Tinmouth, bending north and bypassing the hamlet of East Wells. Running along the side of a ridge, VT 133 becomes West Tinmouth Road, soon reaching Middletown Springs.

VT 133 becomes known as South Street as it enters Middletown Springs, winding through fields and nearby golf courses, making a short northwestern turn near Daisy Hollow Road. As it enters the center of Middletown Springs, VT 133 bends northeast, becoming the main north–south street through the community, a two-lane residential street. Crossing the Poultney River, the route enters downtown Middletown Springs, reaching a junction with VT 140 (West Street). VT 133 and VT 140 run concurrent on East Street, running through Middletown Springs. The routes soon leave downtown Middletown Springs, paralleling the Poultney River, along East Street.

VT 133 and VT 140 run east for a distance, soon bending southeast, changing names to Morgan Road when the routes re-enter the town of Tinmouth. In Tinmouth, VT 133 forks northeast on Morgan Road while VT 140 runs southeast from there. Making a gradual curve to the north, VT 133 leaves the town of Tinmouth for the town of Ira, remaining a two-lane rural roadway. Through Ira, the route does sporadically cross through dense woods, turning northeast through the fields in town. VT 133 passes the residential "center" of Ira, a small hamlet along the road, consisting of a short eastern turn until Weaver Hill Road.

VT 133 runs northeast through Ira, soon crossing into the town of Clarendon. The route junctions with Walker Mountain Road, where it gains the moniker of Clarendon Road. Paralleling the Clarendon River, VT 133 reaches West Rutland, where it changes names to Clarendon Avenue. Through West Rutland, VT 133 runs northwest, becoming a main residential street through town. At Fox Run Lane, the route bends northward, crossing under US 4 just west of exit 6. After US 4, VT 133 turns north for three blocks, reaching a junction with VT 4A (Main Street).

== Major intersections ==
The entire route is in Rutland County.

Location	mi	km	Destinations	Notes
Pawlet	0.000	0.000	VT 30 – Dorset, Manchester, Wells, Poultney	Southern terminus
Middletown Springs	11.573	18.625	VT 140 west (West Street) – Poultney	Southern end of concurrency with VT 140
Tinmouth	13.617	21.914	VT 140 east – Tinmouth, Wallingford	Northern end of concurrency with VT 140
West Rutland	22.476	36.172	VT 4A (Main Street) – Castleton, Fair Haven, Rutland	Northern terminus
1.000 mi = 1.609 km; 1.000 km = 0.621 mi: Concurrency terminus
