= Mettawee Valley =

Agricultural region in Vermont

Coordinates: 43.426°N 73.206°W

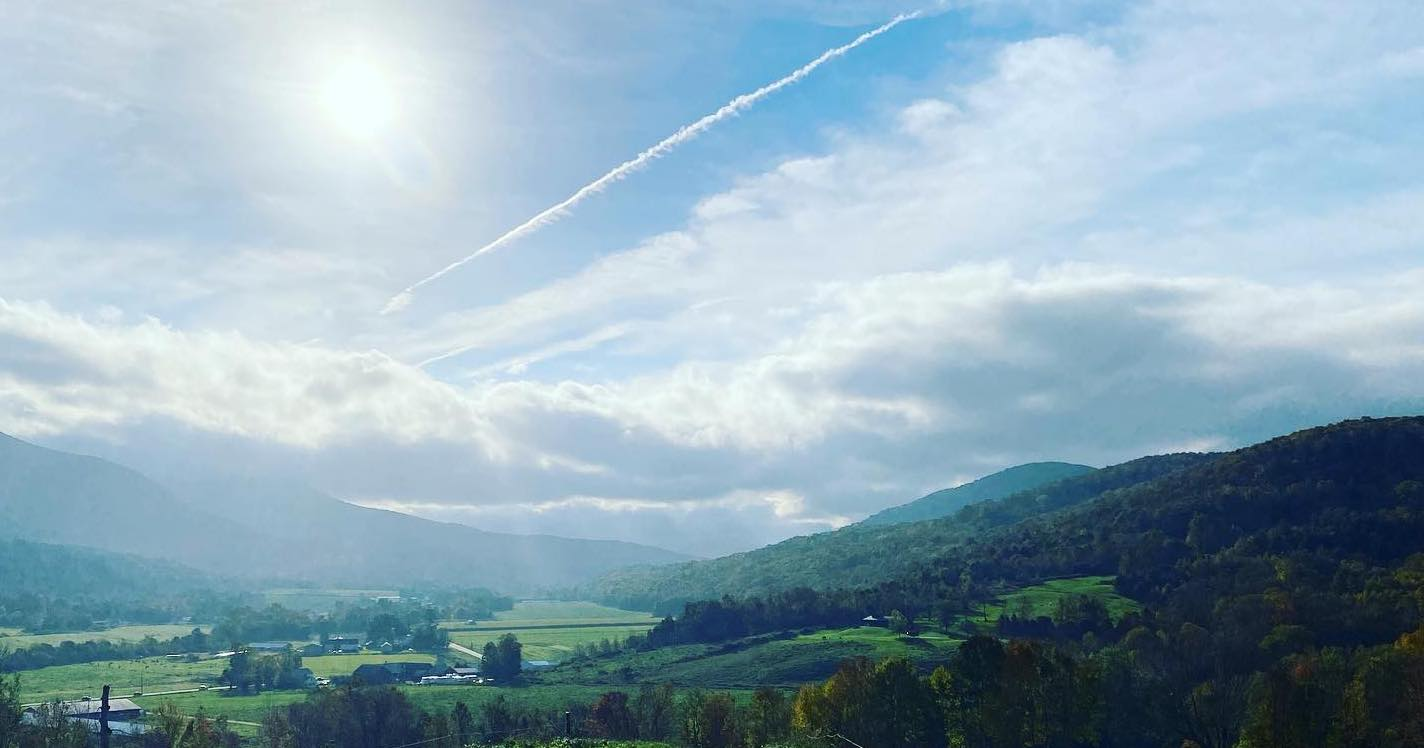
View of the Mettawee Valley from upland pasture in Pawlet, VT

The Mettawee Valley (also known as the Mettawee River Valley, and sometimes spelled “Mettowee”) is the valley of the Mettawee River in the Taconic Mountains of southwestern Vermont centered on the agricultural communities of North Rupert and Pawlet, and stretching toward Granville, New York. Known for "some of the most beautiful natural landscapes in all of Vermont," almost 5,000 acres (20 km^{2}) of Mettawee Valley land have been conserved in partnership with the Vermont Land Trust.

== Geography ==
Following the Mettawee River as it comes north out of the town of Dorset, the Valley opens up in North Rupert as the "Pawlet Flats," rich farmland well-suited to hay, corn, and other crops. The surrounding forests produce lumber as well as maple syrup and related products.

"The valley proper lies northwest-southeast along some 15 mi (24 km) of Vermont 30. Steep, forested hills define its sides, with rock-faced Haystack Mountain at its northern end. The Mettowee River, a rippling, gravelly trout stream, splashes through the valley, its winding course marked by rows of trees that stand out against the big cornfields and broad, golden meadows."

== History ==
Part of the northeastern territory of the Mohican tribe, the towns of the Mettawee Valley were chartered by colonial Governor Benning Wentworth of New Hampshire in 1761. The town of Pawlet served as a rendezvous point for American Revolutionary forces in 1777 as they harassed troops under the command of General John Burgoyne, "cut[ting] off his supplies and in a thousand ways obstruct[ing] his march."

Having noted the beauty and productivity of the valley, "many soldiers of the Revolution...were so pleased with it, that on their release from the army they came directly here." This includes members of families still prominent in Pawlet today including the Huletts, Leaches, Sargents, and Sheldons.

== Major industries ==
=== Agriculture ===
Agriculture has long been at the heart of the Mettawee Valley, from the earliest days of homesteading settlers to the heyday of Vermont dairy farming in the 1940s. While the number of working farms has steadily declined, much of the Mettawee Valley remains in agriculture use by small farms producing milk, beef, pork, poultry, eggs, corn, alfalfa, and soybeans.
