= Slate Ridge Vermont =

Firearms training facility in Vermont

Slate Ridge, also called Slate Ridge Vermont and operating under the trade name Honvend Security Solutions, is an unpermitted firearms training facility in West Pawlet, Vermont, operated by Daniel Banyai. The use of this residential property for training has been a source of significant controversy since it began operating in 2017.

== Facility ==
According to Banyai, while deployed as a private military contractor (Note: It is unclear if Banyai was ever deployed. He was enlisted in the U.S. Army for only two weeks and though he was part of a military contracting company, the company received no contracts and performed no training according to his business partner) he perceived a lack of training among the other soldiers and developed an idea for a training camp for a wide range of combat situations. He purchased a plot of land in 2013 in Vermont because of the state's "constitutional carry" laws and he believed it was isolated enough from the surrounding properties to not disturb them. Banyai has since constructed, at a cost he puts at $1.6 million, a 500-square-foot training center and various other sites on the land to train for scenarios such as home invasion, carjacking, and shipboard combat. Often calling the facility a school, Banyai registered the place as a nonprofit corporation under the name Slate Ridge Incorporated in 2021.

Banyai says that most of Slate Ridge's visitors come from out-of-state, though members of the Vermont State Militia have also trained regularly at the facility. The property regularly displays the flag of the Green Mountain Boys, an 18th-century militia group formed in what is now southwestern Vermont to resist land formerly owned by New Hampshire from being controlled by New York, which had been given the land by the Crown. On many occasions neighbors have witnessed armed groups patrolling the boundaries of the facility.

== Conflict with Pawlet residents ==
After setting up the first firing ranges on his property, Banyai applied for a permit for a 500-square-foot schoolhouse in 2018, which was initially denied due to the property not having a wide enough driveway. Because this driveway ran through the neighboring Hulett family's property, Banyai needed his neighbors' permissions to widen it. The Huletts were already unhappy about the amount of shooting at his ranges and declined the request, as did his other neighbors. Banyai began construction anyway. He managed to get another application approved several months later, though forty-six Pawlet residents signed a petition opposing his permit and afterward appealed the decision. In subsequent years, several more permits were filed for Slate Ridge with varying success and residents continued to appeal any approvals. The Town of Pawlet also brought a case against Banyai for environmental violations.

During the course of these disputes, the neighbors and town officials who opposed Banyai's expansions began to receive threatening cards in the mail from Slate Ridge and also were the targets of threatening posts on the facility's Facebook page. In one incident in 2020 a group of two men and two teenagers were looking for a deer they believed they had shot while bow hunting near the property when they were confronted by Banyai. He threatened to shoot them if they crossed his property line.

== Official investigations and court rulings ==
In 2020 the federal Bureau of Alcohol, Tobacco, Firearms and Explosives released a bulletin about Banyai stating that he is prohibited from carrying firearms. This follows two felony charges in New York, including third-degree criminal possession of a weapon, to which he pleaded guilty.

Citing several threatening Facebook posts, in January 2021 a judge granted neighbor Mandy Hulett a two-year protective order against Banyai. In his defense, Banyai claimed to not operate the Facebook page for Slate Ridge, but that statement was deemed not credible. This ruling was affirmed by the Vermont Supreme Court six months later.

The Vermont Environmental Court ruled against Banyai on March 4, 2021, fining him $46,000 and ordering him to remove all buildings not permitted by zoning laws. Banyai stated publicly that he would not comply with the order and held a "Second Amendment Picnic" on April 17. During the event numerous visitors made use of the facility's shooting ranges, which prompted the Town of Pawlet to file a motion for civil contempt. His attorney filed an appeal to the Vermont Supreme Court the following May, but the higher court upheld the previous rulings. On July 6, 2023, a judge on the Vermont Environmental Court ruled that Banyai be arrested until he could prove that the unpermitted buildings have been removed or demolished.

On March 20, 2024, the town constable of Pawlet, Vermont arrested Banyai. Banyai was the passenger in a vehicle pulled over for speeding, resisted arrest, and was subdued with pepper spray and taken into custody.

On September 10, 2024, Banyai was arrested after being seen in New York state in August, 2024. A condition of his release after his contempt of court case in April, 2024 stated that he must remain in the state of Vermont.

On September 27, 2024, it was reported that the town of Pawlet, Vermont wanted to foreclose Slate Ridge. Town officials asked a judge to foreclose the property, citing that Banyai owes more than $226,000 in fines and legal fees associated with the ongoing legal disputes over the property.
