= Pawlet =

Pawlet or Pawlett may refer to:

- Pawlet, Vermont, United States
  - Pawlet (CDP), Vermont, the main village in the town of Pawlet
- Pawlett, Somerset, England
