= Vermont Route 31 =

State highway in Rutland County, Vermont, US

Vermont Route 31
- VT 31 highlighted in red

Route information
- Maintained by VTrans
- Length: 5.535 mi (8.908 km)
- Existed: December 1966–present

Major junctions
- South end: CR 25 at the New York state line in Wells
- North end: VT 30 in Poultney

Location
- Country: United States
- State: Vermont
- Counties: Rutland

Highway system
- State highways in Vermont
| ← VT 30B | → VT 35 |

Vermont Route 31 (VT 31) is a 5.535-mile-long (8.908 km) state highway in Vermont in the United States. Located entirely in Rutland County, it runs from the New York state line in Wells to Furnace Street (VT 30) in Poultney. VT 31 was established in December 1966.

== Route description ==
VT 31 begins at the New York state line in Wells, where it connects to Washington County's County Route 25. The county road continues south to New York State Route 149 in Granville. VT 31 heads north-northeast, roughly parallel to the New York – Vermont border, and to the west of the Taconic Mountains. The highway passes Lake St. Catherine as it heads towards South Poultney. Throughout the road's path, it crosses several creeks, including the Poultney River. Shortly after crossing over the river and entering the village of Poultney on Grove Street, VT 31 terminates at an intersection with VT 30 (Furnace Street). Grove Street continues north of this point as VT 30.

== Major intersections ==
The entire route is in Rutland County.

| Location | mi | km | Destinations | Notes |
|---|---|---|---|---|
| Wells | 0.000 | 0.000 | CR 25 | Continuation into New York |
| Village of Poultney | 5.535 | 8.908 | VT 30 (Furnace Street / Grove Street) | Northern terminus |
1.000 mi = 1.609 km; 1.000 km = 0.621 mi
