= Wells Village School =

- U.S. National Register of Historic Places
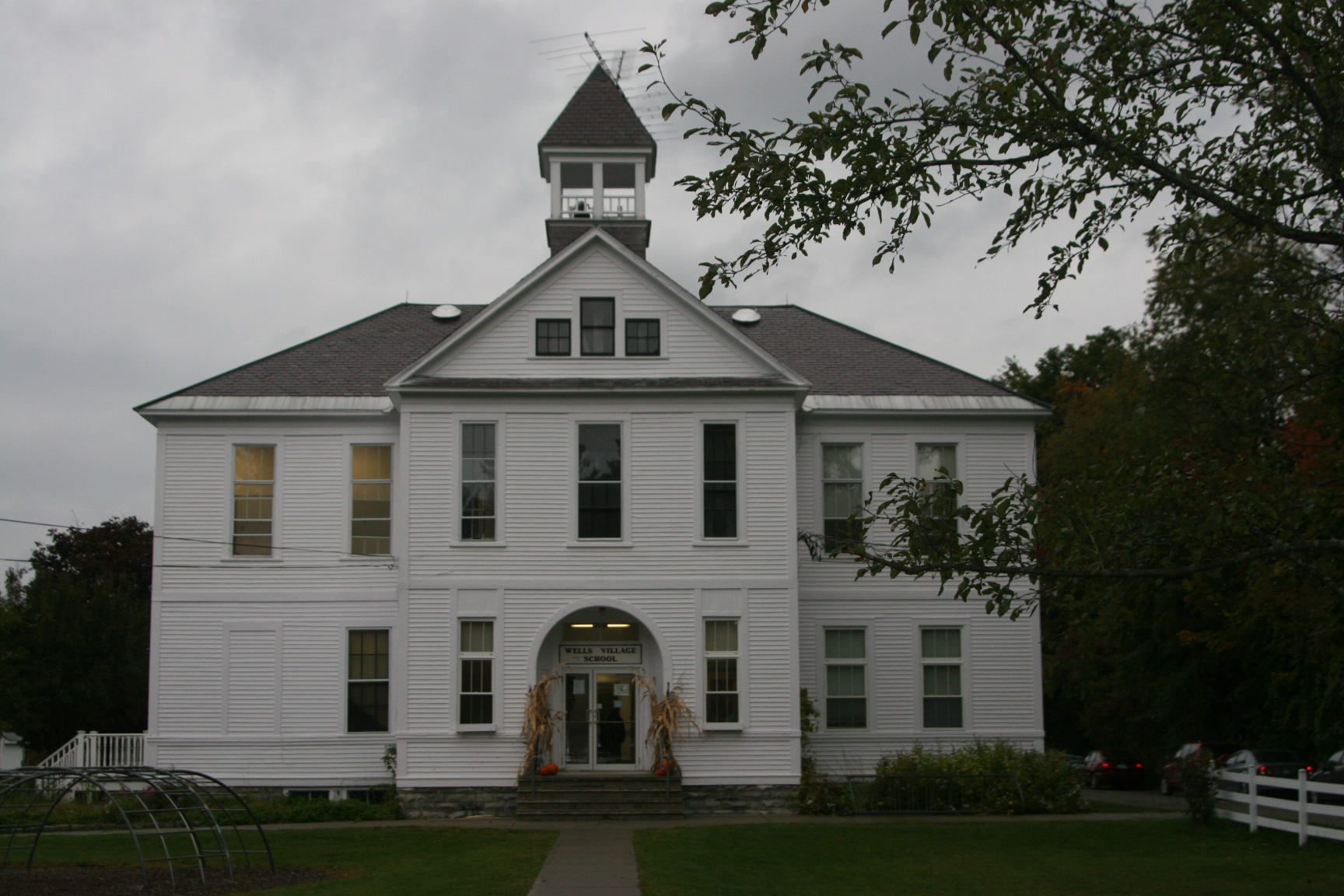

- Location within Vermont Location within the United States
- Location: N side of Main St. (VT 30), Wells, Vermont
- Coordinates: 43°25′5″N 73°12′25″W
- Area: less than one acre
- Built: 1899
- Architectural style: Colonial Revival
- Website: https://wvs.grcsu.org/
- MPS: Educational Resources of Vermont MPS
- NRHP reference No.: 93001004
- Added to NRHP: October 7, 1993

The Wells Village School is a public school serving grades K through 6 in Wells, Vermont. Built about 1899, it is a fine and imposing local example of Colonial Revival architecture, designed to meet the latest school standards of the time. It was listed on the National Register of Historic Places in 1993.

== Description and history ==
The Wells Village School is located on the west side of the main village of Wells, on the north side of Main Street (Vermont Route 30). It is a long rectangular two-story wood frame building, with hip-roofed end sections at either end of a central gabled section. The front-facing hipped section is fronted by a two-story gabled vestibule, with the main entrance set in a round-arch opening at its base. The front hip section is topped by a square turret with a pyramidal roof and an open belfry.

The school was built by the town in about 1899, in order to improve the town's school facilities and merge two district schools. It originally had two classrooms on the ground floor, and an open meeting space with stage on the upper floor, which could be used for town meetings. The building has undergone several alterations over the years, due to changing state requirements for schools. Additional windows and fire exits were added in the early decades of the 20th century. In 1987 the rear addition was added to the building, and the upstairs space was converted into two classrooms.

== See also ==
- National Register of Historic Places listings in Rutland County, Vermont
