= Vermont Route 315 =

State highway in Rupert, Vermont, United States

Vermont Route 315
- Map of Bennington County in southwestern Vermont with VT 315 highlighted in red

Route information
- Maintained by the Town of Rupert
- Length: 5.83 mi (9.38 km)

Major junctions
- West end: VT 153 in Rupert
- East end: VT 30 in Rupert

Location
- Country: United States
- State: Vermont
- Counties: Bennington

Highway system
- State highways in Vermont
← VT 314	→ VT 346

Vermont Route 315 (VT 315) is a 5.83-mile-long (9.38 km) state highway located within the town of Rupert in Bennington County, Vermont, United States. It connects VT 153 in Rupert to VT 30 in the village of East Rupert. The entirety of VT 315 is maintained by the town of Rupert.

== Route description ==
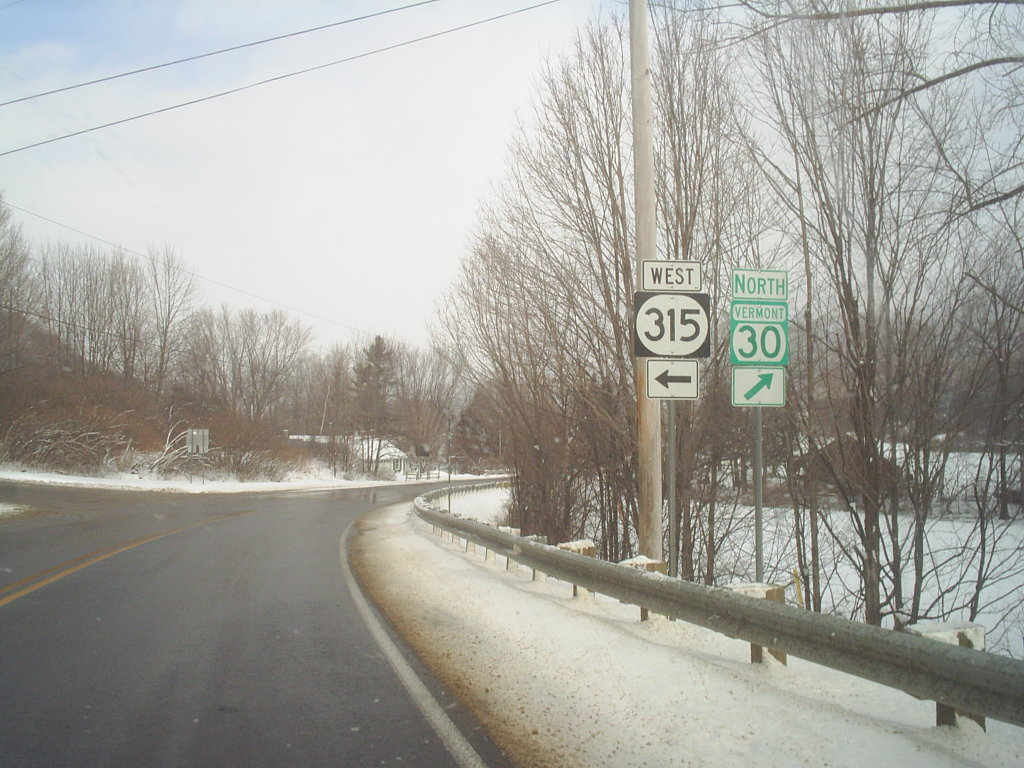
Eastern terminus of Route 315 at Route 30

VT 315 begins in the west at an intersection with VT 153. VT 153 southbound from this intersection provides a connection with New York State Route 22 and also runs northbound, paralleling the state border with New York to provide a more northerly connection with NY 22. VT 315 proceeds to the east, running through a generally isolated area, and ending at VT 30 in East Rupert.

== Major intersections ==
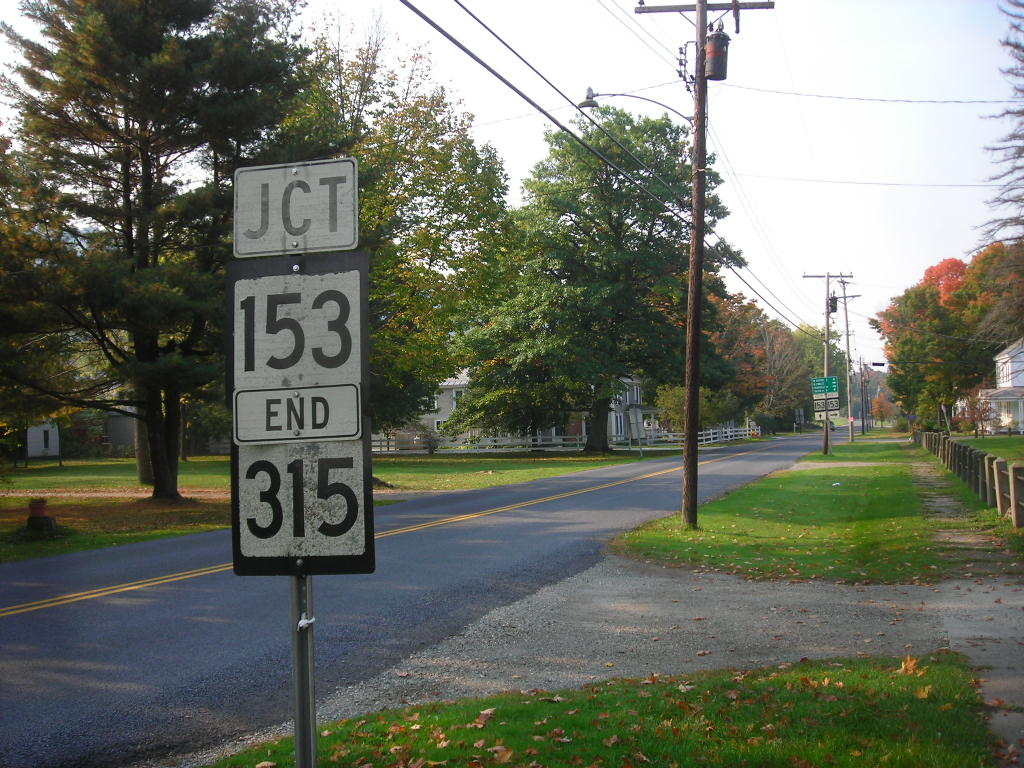
The western terminus of Route 315 at Route 153 in Rupert (This assembly was replaced sometime between 2008 and 2012).

The entire route is in Rupert, Bennington County.

mi	km	Destinations	Notes
0.00	0.00	VT 153 – West Rupert, Salem NY, West Pawlet, Granville NY	Western terminus
5.83	9.38	VT 30 – Poultney, Manchester	Eastern terminus
1.000 mi = 1.609 km; 1.000 km = 0.621 mi
