= Dorset (CDP), Vermont =

Census-designated place in Vermont, United States

Dorset, Vermont
- Census-designated place
- Location within Vermont Location within the United States
- Coordinates: 43°15′06″N 73°06′02″W
- Country: United States
- State: Vermont
- County: Bennington
- Town: Dorset

Area
  - Total: 2.10 sq mi (5.44 km^{2})
  - Land: 2.08 sq mi (5.39 km^{2})
  - Water: 0.019 sq mi (0.05 km^{2})
- Elevation: 915 ft (279 m)

Population (2020)
  - Total: 360
- Time zone: UTC-5 (Eastern (EST))
  - Summer (DST): UTC-4 (EDT)
- ZIP Code: 05251
- Area code: 802
- FIPS code: 50-17650
- GNIS feature ID: 2586627

Dorset is the primary settlement and a census-designated place (CDP) in the town of Dorset, Bennington County, Vermont, United States. As of the 2020 census, the CDP had a population of 360, out of 2,133 in the entire town.

It is in northern Bennington County, in the western part of the town of Dorset, in a valley between Spruce Peak to the west, Mount Aeolus to the southeast, and Dorset Mountain to the northeast. Vermont Route 30 passes through the center of the village, leading southeast 6 miles (10 km) to Manchester Center and northwest 8 miles (13 km) to Pawlet. The Mettawee River runs through the northern part of the CDP, flowing northwest to the southern end of Lake Champlain at Whitehall, New York.
