= Frederick W. Adams =

American physician

- Born: December 27, 1786; Pawlet, Vermont Republic
- Died: December 17, 1858 (aged 71), Montpelier, United States
- Education: Dartmouth College
- Occupation: physician

Frederick Whiting Adams (December 27, 1786 – December 17, 1858) was a medical doctor, writer, and violin maker.

== Biography ==
He was born in Pawlet, Vermont in 1786, and graduated from Dartmouth College with a medical degree in 1822.

Upon graduation, he practiced medicine in Barton, Vermont, continuing there through 1836. Beginning in 1835, he also attended medical lectures in Philadelphia, Pennsylvania. In 1836, he moved to Montpelier, Vermont, where he continued his practice.

He was a skilled violin player, and early in life turned his attention to making violins as an avocation. He was of the opinion that the superior tones of the Amati and Stradivarius instruments were due to their having been made of old and seasoned wood. Accordingly, he selected the wood for his violins himself from the forests of Vermont and Canada, taking his wood from partially decayed trees. He constructed 140 violins.

He is the author of several works dealing with theology, including Theological Criticism: or, Hints of the Philosophy of Man and Nature, published in 1843. He died in Montpelier in 1858.

He married Rachel Harmon (March 27, 1785 – December 16, 1818) on April 24, 1808. She was also born in Pawlet. They had five children. She died in Barton, Vermont, and he later married Mary Ann Wallace.
