= John Nassivera =

American author, playwright and professor

John Nassivera (born 1950) is an American author, playwright and college professor.

== Early life and education ==
Nassivera was born in Queensbury, New York into an Italian American family who came from Forni di Sotto, Italy. He received his B.A. from Boston University in 1972 and his Ph.D. in Comparative Literature from McGill University in Montreal in 1977. He also studied at the University of Pisa, Italy. He lives in the historic Jenks Tavern building in Dorset, Vermont, and part time in Mexico.

== Career ==
Nassivera then returned to New York to teach literature at Columbia University and become a Fellow in Columbia University's Society of Fellows in the Humanities.

Nassivera was active in the theater, both as a playwright and as a producer. As well as his work in New York, he was co-founder of the Dorset Theater Festival in Vermont, a professional theater company that has presented a number of plays that were then produced in New York off-Broadway and on Broadway.

Nassivera produced a number of plays with Broadway and off-Broadway producer Edgar Lansbury, including Nassivera's play All the Queen's Men starring Elizabeth Ashley, Without Apologies starring Carrie Nye, Advice from a Caterpillar starring Ally Sheedy, and Grace and Glory starring Estelle Parsons. Nassivera's play The Penultimate Problem of Sherlock Holmes starred Keith Baxter and run off-Broadway at the Hudson Guild Theater.

Another of Nassivera's plays, Making a Killing was presented at the Access Theatre at 390 Broadway, and later at the Limelight Theatre in North Hollywood. His play Phallacies, a farce about Sigmund Freud and Gustav Jung, ran at the New Playwrights Theater in Washington, DC. Tony Award-winning actress Adriane Lenox starred in his play with music The Jazz Club at the Coconut Grove Playhouse in Miami.

== Academic career ==
Nassivera, in his later life, returned to literary studies, the history of religion, and non-fiction writing. His Ph.D. dissertation was in medieval studies and was titled Amo Ergo Sum: A Retrospection of Medieval Secular and Spiritual Lyricism and is available on line. The work is a study of the transition from pagan to Christian ideas of love and the role that forms of proto-psychology played in both secular and religious poetry. His most recent books are The Devil's Dictionary for an Ungodly Age and God.org: Why Religion Really Matters. He has authored the book Sacred Stones, Sacrifice and Scandal: Temple Mount, Golgotha, and the Kaaba and their role in world peace. He has published in such monthly journals as Echos du Monde Classique, The Mediterranean Review, The Boston University Journal, Paideuma, and America. Nassivera has received awards from the National Endowment for the Arts, Canada Council on the Humanities, and has received a Walter Cerf Award from the Vermont Arts Council. He writes regular Commentary pieces on religion and society in the Pulitzer Prize winning paper The Rutland Herald.
