= Rupert, Vermont =

- Town
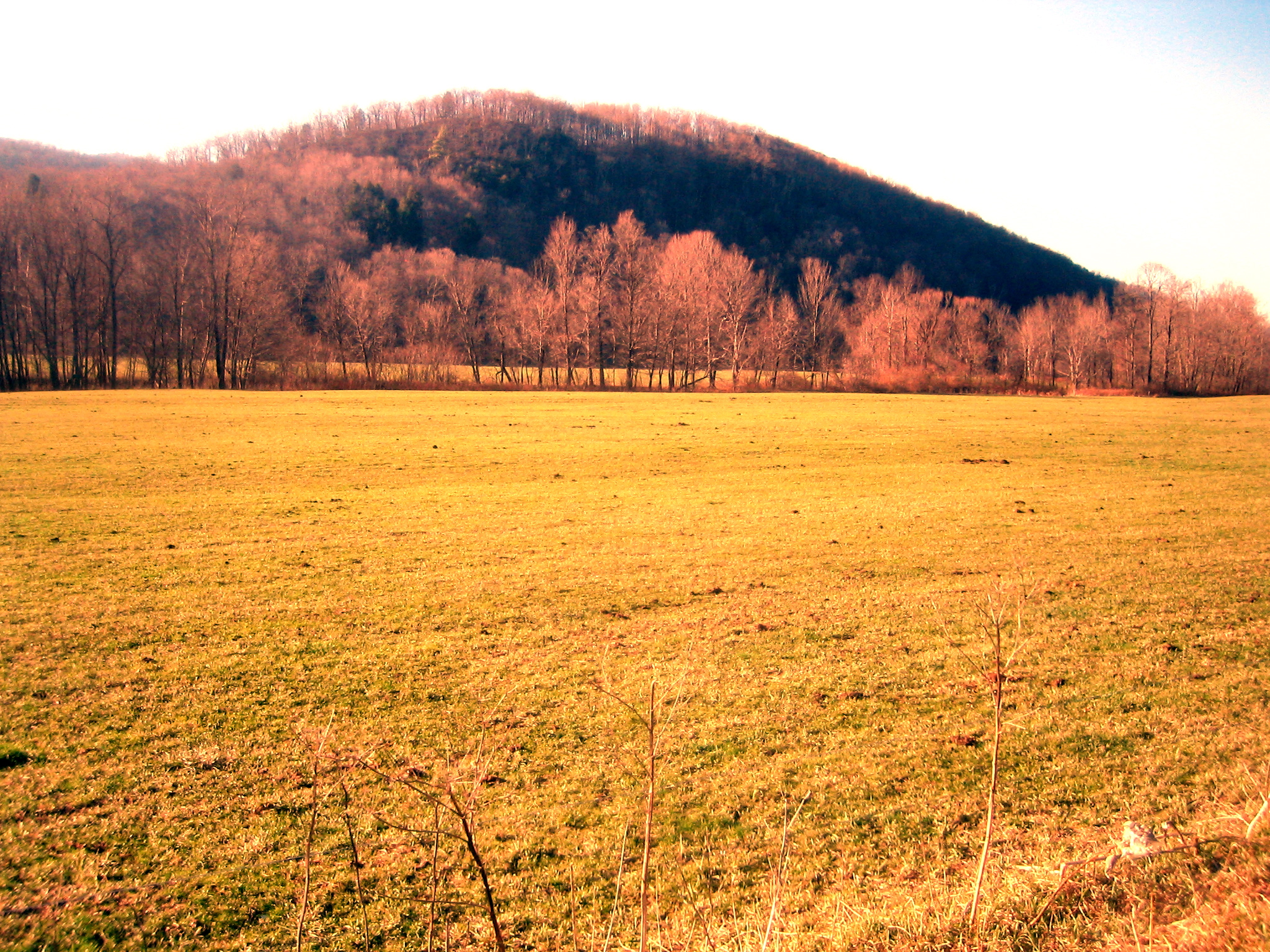
- Countryside in eastern Rupert

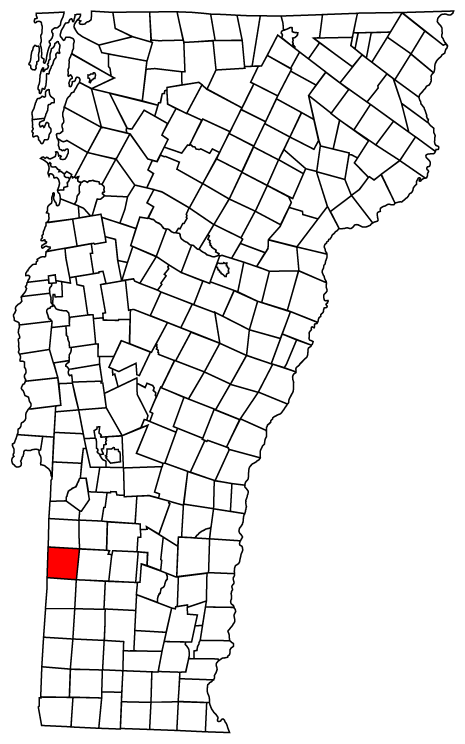
- Location of Rupert within Vermont
- Coordinates: 43°15′42″N 73°11′22″W
- Country: United States
- State: Vermont
- County: Bennington
- Communities: Rupert; East Rupert; North Rupert; West Rupert

Area
  - Total: 44.6 sq mi (115.5 km^{2})
  - Land: 44.6 sq mi (115.4 km^{2})
  - Water: 0.039 sq mi (0.1 km^{2})
- Elevation: 1,299 ft (396 m)

Population (2020)
  - Total: 698
  - Density: 16/sq mi (6/km^{2})
- Time zone: UTC-5 (Eastern (EST))
  - Summer (DST): UTC-4 (EDT)
- ZIP Codes: 05768 (Rupert); 05776 (West Rupert); 05251 (Dorset); 05761 (Pawlet); 05775 (West Pawlet)
- Area code: 802
- FIPS code: 50-61000
- GNIS feature ID: 1462192
- Website: rupert.vt.gov

Rupert is a town in Bennington County, Vermont, United States. The population was 698 at the 2020 census.

The town is home to The Maple News, a trade publication focused on the maple syrup industry, and the former Jenks Tavern, built around 1807, which is listed on the National Register of Historic Places.

== Geography ==
Rupert is located in the northwest corner of Bennington County, bordered by Washington County, New York to the west and Rutland County to the north. The town is situated in the Taconic Mountains; the highest point is a 3,010-foot (920 m) summit on the ridge of Bear Mountain in the southeast corner of the town.

According to the United States Census Bureau, the town has a total area of 44.6 square miles (115.5 km^{2}), of which 44.6 square miles (115.4 km^{2}) is land and 0.04 square miles (0.1 km^{2}), or 0.08%, is water. The northern portion of the town is drained by the Mettawee River and Indian River, tributaries of Lake Champlain, while the rest of the town drains to the Batten Kill in New York and eventually the Hudson River.

The northeast corner of town is crossed by Vermont Route 30, following the Mettawee River. Vermont Route 153 runs north–south through the western part of the town before crossing into New York. Vermont Route 315 runs east–west through the center of the town, connecting to VT 30 in East Rupert and to VT 153 in Rupert proper. The town also has the hamlets of West Rupert (on VT 153) and North Rupert (on VT 30).

== History ==
Many historians agree that Benning Wentworth, colonial governor of New Hampshire, gave Rupert its name, after Prince Rupert of the Rhine (1619–1682). Prince Rupert was a prominent figure in the English Civil War and afterwards.

One of Rupert's first settlers was Reuben Harmon, a metalsmith, who was given the right to mint coins, called Vermont coppers, for the Republic of Vermont. Harmon's Mint was originally located in East Rupert on a small stream known as Hagar's Brook. It was later moved Southwind Farm in North Rupert.

Rupert is the filming location for seasons 1-10 of the syndicated PBS cooking show Cook's Country. The iconic white country house, known as Carver House, is located near the center of town on the corner of Rupert Avenue and West Pawlett Road 43.25988°N 73.22325°W across the road from the Rupert Methodist Church.

== Demographics ==
Historical population
| Census | Pop. | Note | %± |
|---|---|---|---|
| 1790 | 1,033 | | — |
| 1800 | 1,648 | | 59.5% |
| 1810 | 1,630 | | −1.1% |
| 1820 | 1,332 | | −18.3% |
| 1830 | 1,318 | | −1.1% |
| 1840 | 1,091 | | −17.2% |
| 1850 | 1,101 | | 0.9% |
| 1860 | 1,103 | | 0.2% |
| 1870 | 1,017 | | −7.8% |
| 1880 | 957 | | −5.9% |
| 1890 | 861 | | −10.0% |
| 1900 | 863 | | 0.2% |
| 1910 | 825 | | −4.4% |
| 1920 | 674 | | −18.3% |
| 1930 | 691 | | 2.5% |
| 1940 | 678 | | −1.9% |
| 1950 | 713 | | 5.2% |
| 1960 | 603 | | −15.4% |
| 1970 | 582 | | −3.5% |
| 1980 | 605 | | 4.0% |
| 1990 | 654 | | 8.1% |
| 2000 | 704 | | 7.6% |
| 2010 | 714 | | 1.4% |
| 2020 | 698 | | −2.2% |
U.S. Decennial Census

At the 2000 census, there were 704 people, 295 households and 205 families residing in the town. The population density was 15.8 per square mile (6.1/km^{2}). There were 449 housing units at an average density of 10.1 per square mile (3.9/km^{2}). The racial makeup of the town was 99.72% White, 0.14% Native American and 0.14% Asian. Hispanic or Latino of any race were 0.99% of the population.

There were 295 households, of which 28.8% had children under the age of 18 living with them, 62.7% were couples living together and joined in either marriage or Civil Union, 4.7% had a female householder with no husband present, and 30.2% were non-families. 24.4% of all households were made up of individuals, and 14.2% had someone living alone who was 65 years of age or older. The average household size was 2.39 and the average family size was 2.86.

22.3% of the population were under the age of 18, 5.1% from 18 to 24, 23.9% from 25 to 44, 26.4% from 45 to 64, and 22.3% who were 65 years of age or older. The median age was 44 years. For every 100 females, there were 90.3 males. For every 100 females age 18 and over, there were 86.7 males.

The median household income was $36,429 and the median family income was $41,339. Males had a median income of $27,500 compared with $21,797 for females. The per capita income for the town was $20,480. About 2.7% of families and 6.1% of the population were below the poverty line, including 8.4% of those under age 18 and 4.8% of those age 65 or over.

== Notable people ==
- Frederick Buechner, American writer and theologian
- Samuel Gookins, Justice of the Indiana Supreme Court
- Christopher Kimball, American chef, editor, publisher, and radio/TV personality
- William H. Meyer, member of the United States House of Representatives
- Sheldon Roberts, American semi-conductor pioneer-member of the "traitorous eight" to form Fairchild Semiconductor One of the three founders of Teledyne
- General Moses Sherman, American land developer who built Streetcar systems in Phoenix, Arizona and Los Angeles, California. Born in Rupert
- Israel Smith, member of the U.S. House of Representatives, member of the U.S. Senate and fourth governor of Vermont; practiced law in Rupert
