= Wells (CDP), Vermont =

Census-designated place in Vermont, United States

Wells, Vermont
- Census-designated place
- Location within Vermont Location within the United States
- Coordinates: 43°25′15″N 73°12′27″W
- Country: United States
- State: Vermont
- County: Rutland
- Town: Wells

Area
  - Total: 0.81 sq mi (2.09 km^{2})
  - Land: 0.79 sq mi (2.05 km^{2})
  - Water: 0.015 sq mi (0.04 km^{2})
- Elevation: 486 ft (148 m)

Population (2020)
  - Total: 386
- Time zone: UTC-5 (Eastern (EST))
  - Summer (DST): UTC-4 (EDT)
- ZIP Code: 05774
- Area code: 802
- FIPS code: 50-77875
- GNIS feature ID: 2586659

Wells is the central village and a census-designated place (CDP) in the town of Wells, Rutland County, Vermont, United States. As of the 2020 census, it had a population of 386, out of 1,214 in the entire town.

== Geography ==
The CDP is in southwestern Rutland County, in the southwest part of the town of Wells. It sits at the western base of the Taconic Mountains, where Wells Brook exits and flows west toward the Mettawee River, a northwest-flowing tributary of Lake Champlain.

Vermont Route 30 passes through the village, leading north 8 miles (13 km) to Poultney and south 7 miles (11 km) to Pawlet. The village of Granville, New York, is 3 miles (5 km) to the southwest.
