= West Pawlet, Vermont =

Census-designated place in Vermont, United States

- Census-designated place
- Location within Vermont Location within the United States
- Coordinates: 43°21′28″N 73°14′58″W
- Country: United States
- State: Vermont
- County: Rutland
- Town: Pawlet

Area
  - Total: 0.53 sq mi (1.36 km^{2})
  - Land: 0.52 sq mi (1.35 km^{2})
  - Water: 0.0039 sq mi (0.01 km^{2})
- Elevation: 571 ft (174 m)

Population (2020)
  - Total: 220
- Time zone: UTC-5 (Eastern (EST))
  - Summer (DST): UTC-4 (EDT)
- ZIP Code: 05775
- Area code: 802
- FIPS code: 50-82150
- GNIS feature ID: 2807155

West Pawlet is an unincorporated village and census-designated place (CDP) in the town of Pawlet, Rutland County, Vermont, United States. As of the 2020 census, it had a population of 220, slightly more than the population of the village of Pawlet at the town center.

== Geography ==
The CDP is in southwestern Rutland County, along the western border of the town, which is also the New York state line. Vermont Route 153 passes through the village, leading northeast 3 miles (5 km) to Vermont Route 30 near North Pawlet and south 7 miles (11 km) to Rupert. Granville, New York, is 4 miles (6 km) to the north via New York State Route 22, which runs just west of West Pawlet.

West Pawlet is in the valley of the Indian River, a north-flowing tributary of the Mettawee River, which it joins at Granville. The rivers are part of the Lake Champlain watershed.
