= Joshua C. Stoddard =

Joshua C. Stoddard (August 26, 1814, in Pawlet, Vermont – April 5, 1902) was an American inventor. He was educated at public schools, and became noted as an apiarist. He also turned his attention to inventing, and on October 9, 1855, patented (U.S. patent 13,668) the steam calliope, used on Mississippi River steamboats. It was referred to in some newspapers as the "steam piano," with Stoddard and several financial backers forming the American Steam Music Company in Worcester, Massachusetts in 1856. His first instrument, consisting of a steam boiler, a set of valves, and fifteen graded steam whistles played from a pinned cylinder, reportedly could be heard for a range of 5 miles (8.0 km). The Worcester City Council banned him from playing it within the city limits because it was so loud. Subsequent models, including those improved by colleague Arthur S. Denny, included more whistles and a keyboard.

He also invented the Stoddard horse-rake, patented in 1879. More than 100,000 of his rakes were produced. Other inventions included a fruit-paring machine, a hay-tedder, and a fire escape system, patented 1884.
