= Kirby Flower Smith =

American classicist

- Born: December 06, 1862; Pawlet, Vermont, US
- Died: December 06, 1918 (aged 56); Baltimore, Maryland, US
- Education: Vermont University
- Spouse: Charlotte Rogers
- Scientific career
- Fields: Classics
- Workplaces: Johns Hopkins University

Kirby Flower Smith (December 6, 1862 – December 6, 1918) was an American classicist, historian, and translator of classical works.

== Early life ==
He was born at Pawlet, Vermont December 6, 1862, the son of Henry H. Smith and Julia Flower Smith. He married Charlotte Rogers on 8 June 1893. He died on December 6, 1918.

He graduated from the University of Vermont in 1884.

In 1885, he attended the Johns Hopkins University and studied Greek, Latin, and Sanskrit under Professors Gildersleeve, Warren, and Bloomfield. He received the degree of Doctor of Philosophy in 1889. He received the honorary degree of LL.D. from the University of Vermont in 1910.

== Career ==
He was immediately made a professor at Johns Hopkins University, and in spite of various offers from other institutions, he remained there until the day of his death.

In 1914–15, he was granted leave of absence to serve as Director of the School of Classical Studies in the American Academy in Rome.

== Bibliography ==
He is the author of several books:

- Archaisms of Terence Mentioned in the Commentary of Donatus
- The Elegies Of Albius Tibullus: The Corpus Tibullianum
- Martial, the Epigrammatist and Other Essays
- Propertius: A Modern Lover in the Augustan Age

== See also ==
- Tibullus
- Propertius
