= Pawlet (CDP), Vermont =

Census-designated place in Vermont, United States

Pawlet, Vermont
- Census-designated place
- Location within Vermont Location within the United States
- Coordinates: 43°20′51″N 73°10′27″W
- Country: United States
- State: Vermont
- County: Rutland
- Town: Pawlet

Area
  - Total: 2.49 sq mi (6.45 km^{2})
  - Land: 2.49 sq mi (6.44 km^{2})
  - Water: 0.0039 sq mi (0.01 km^{2})
- Elevation: 686 ft (209 m)

Population (2020)
  - Total: 194
- Time zone: UTC-5 (Eastern (EST))
  - Summer (DST): UTC-4 (EDT)
- ZIP Code: 05761
- Area code: 802
- FIPS code: 50-54175
- GNIS feature ID: 2807153

Pawlet is the central village and a census-designated place (CDP) in the town of Pawlet, Rutland County, Vermont, United States. As of the 2020 census, it had a population of 194, out of 1,424 in the entire town.

== Geography ==
The CDP is in southwestern Rutland County, at the geographic center of the town of Pawlet. It sits on the west side of the Taconic Mountains, in the valley of the Mettawee River, a northwest-flowing tributary of Lake Champlain.

Vermont Route 30 passes through the village, leading north 7 miles (11 km) to Wells and southeast 8 miles (13 km) to Dorset. Vermont Route 133 has its southern terminus at Route 30 in Pawlet; it leads north 11 miles (18 km) to Middletown Springs.
