= Dorset Mountain =

Mountain in Vermont, United States

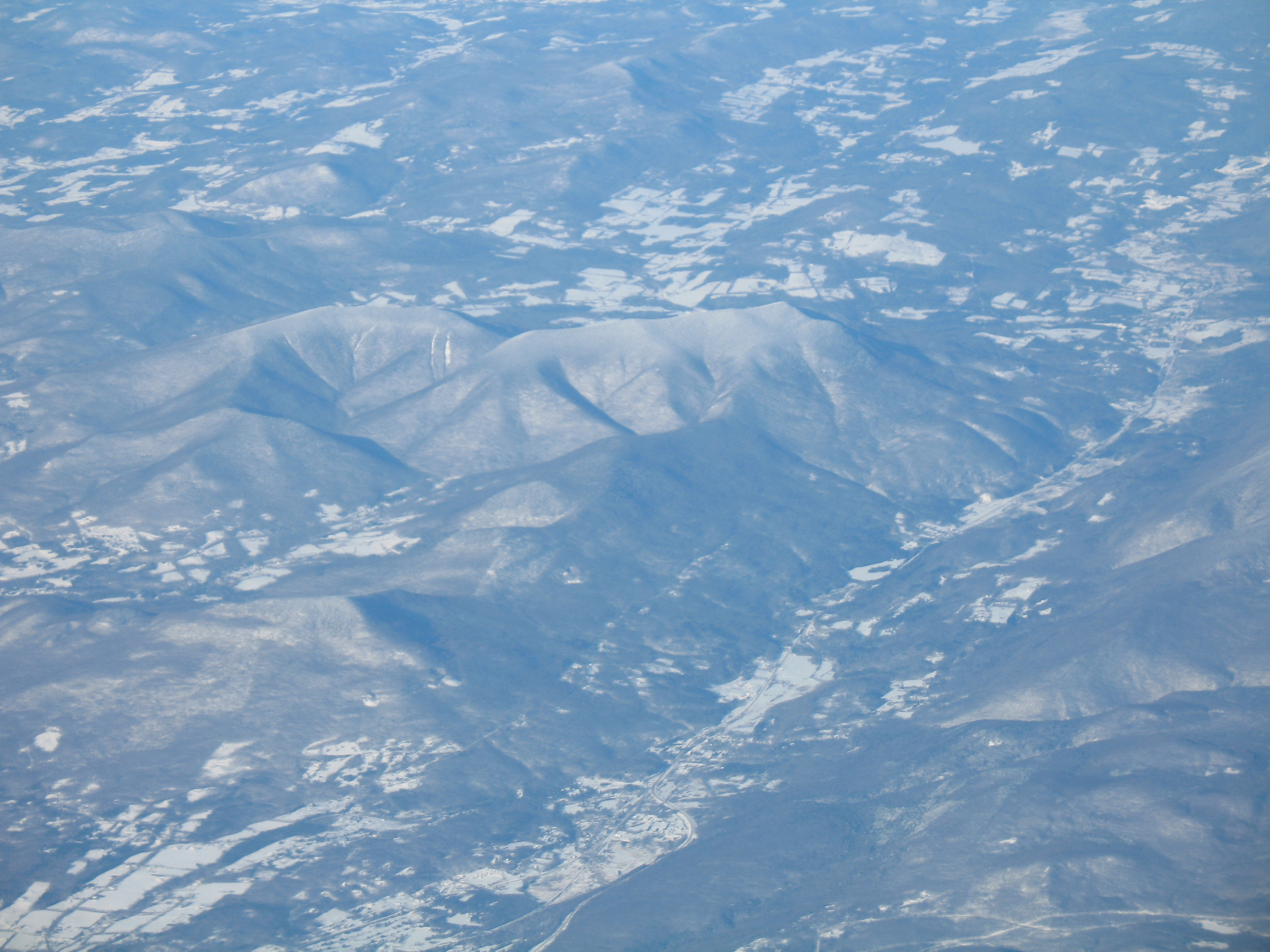
- Dorset Mtn. seen from the southeast

Highest point
- Elevation: 3760+ ft (1146+ m)
- Prominence: 2,820 ft (860 m)
- Listing: #11 New England Fifty Finest #99 New England 100 Highest
- Coordinates: 43°18′33″N 73°01′41″W

Geography
- Location: Rutland County / Bennington County, Vermont, U.S.
- Parent range: Taconic Mountains
- Topo map: USGS Dorset

Climbing
- Easiest route: unmaintained hiking trail

Dorset Mountain, on the border of Rutland and Bennington counties in Vermont, is part of the Taconic Range. The summit of Dorset Mountain is in Danby. An unmaintained hiking trail ascends from the southwest.

Dorset Mountain was the site of an unsuccessfully proposed alpine ski resort project in the 1960s.

Dorset Mountain is flanked to the south by Netop Mountain, Dorset Hill, and Mount Aeolus; to the west by The Scallop; to the northwest by Woodlawn Mountain; and to the southwest by Spruce Peak and The Gallop, subordinate peaks on the combined northern ridge of Bear Mountain and Mother Myrick Mountain. All of these mountains are of the Taconic Range. To the east, Dorset Mountain is flanked by Peru Peak and Styles Peak of the Green Mountains. The east face of Dorset Mountain drains into the upper part of Otter Creek, thence into Lake Champlain, and ultimately into the Gulf of Saint Lawrence in Canada. The northern slopes of Dorset Mountain drain into Mill Brook, thence into Otter Creek. The southwestern slopes drain into the Mettawee River, and thence into the south bay of Lake Champlain. The southeastern extension of Dorset's massif drains into Batten Kill, thence into the Hudson River, and into New York Harbor.

== Danby marble ==
Dorset Mountain is home to the largest underground marble quarry in the world. The quarry is entered through the same opening that has been in use for over 100 years. The mine is 1 ½ miles deep, and this is where Danby marble is quarried. Vermont Quarries Corporation took over the production and operation of the Danby marble quarry in 1992.

== See also ==
- List of mountains in Vermont
- New England Hundred Highest
- New England Fifty Finest
