= Wells, Vermont =

- Town
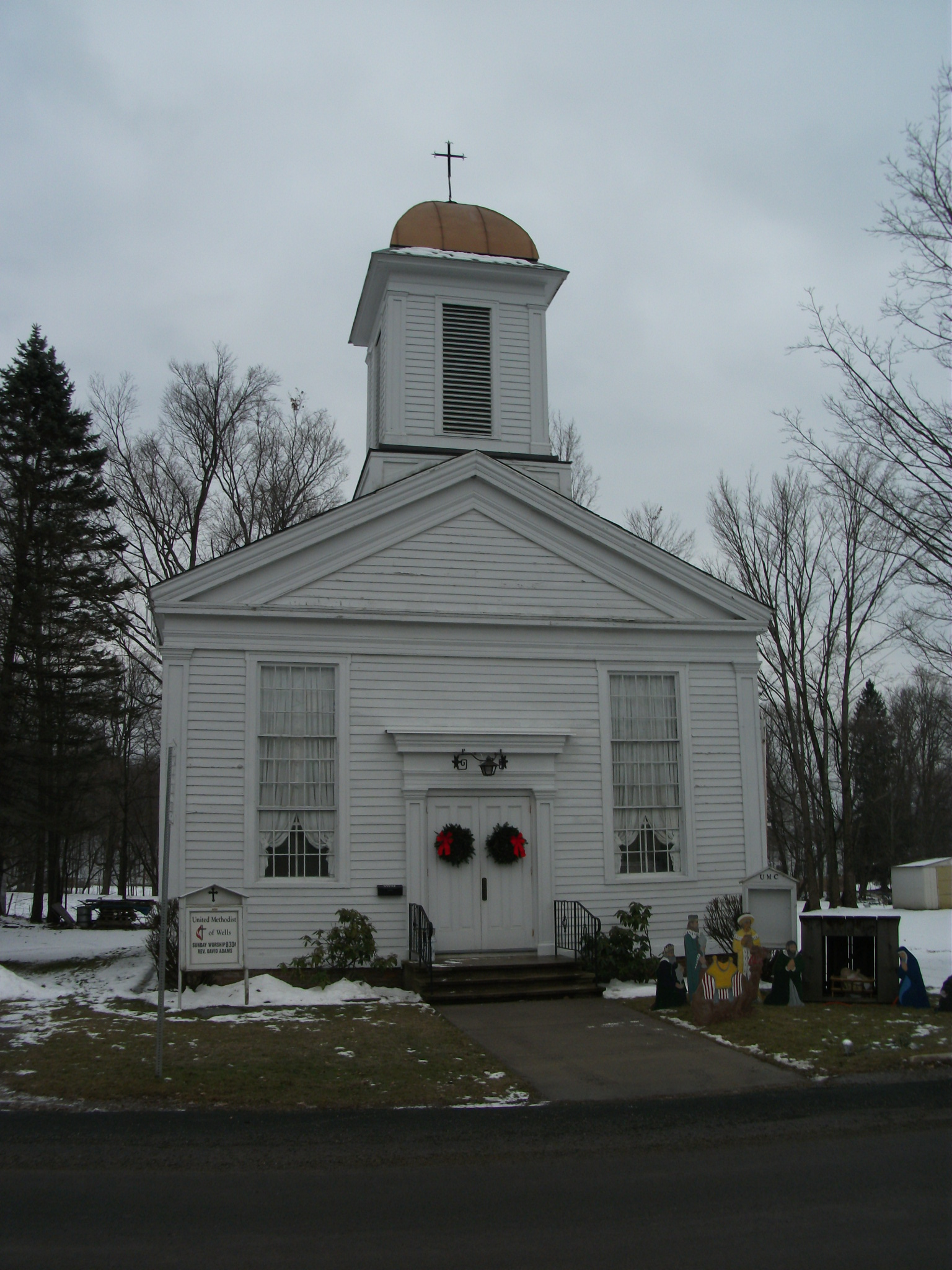
- Church in Wells, Vermont

- Seal

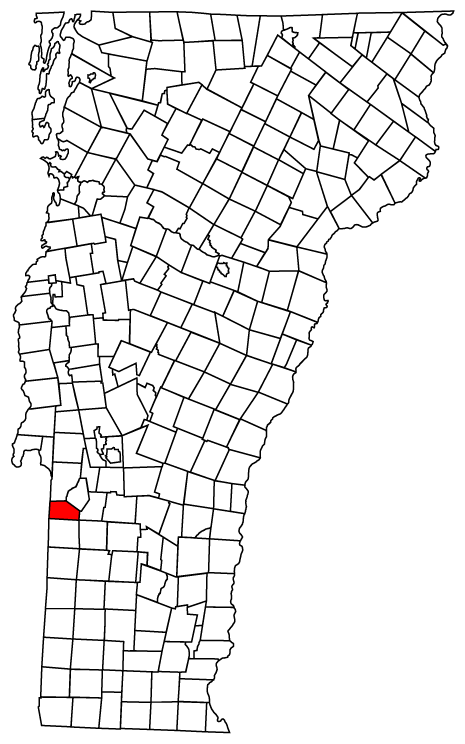
- Wells, Vermont
- Coordinates: 43°25′56″N 73°11′25″W
- Country: United States
- State: Vermont
- County: Rutland
- Communities: Wells; East Wells

Area
  - Total: 23.4 sq mi (60.5 km^{2})
  - Land: 22.5 sq mi (58.4 km^{2})
  - Water: 0.81 sq mi (2.1 km^{2})
- Elevation: 1,158 ft (353 m)

Population (2020)
  - Total: 1,214
  - Density: 53.8/sq mi (20.8/km^{2})
- Time zone: UTC-5 (Eastern (EST))
  - Summer (DST): UTC-4 (EDT)
- ZIP Codes: 05774 (Wells); 05764 (Poultney)
- Area code: 802
- FIPS code: 50-77950
- GNIS feature ID: 1462248
- Website: wellsvt.com

Wells is a town in Rutland County, Vermont, United States. As of the 2020 census, the town had a total population of 1,214.

== Geography ==
According to the United States Census Bureau, the town has a total area of 23.4 square miles (61 km^{2}), of which 22.5 square miles (58 km^{2}) is land and 0.8 square miles (2.1 km^{2}), or 3.42%, is water. The village of Wells is in the southern part of the town, along Vermont Route 30.

Little Lake (also known as Little Pond) is situated entirely within the town, and a portion of Lake Saint Catherine falls within the town as well. Raymond Lobdell's "A Natural Resource Planning Study of Wells, Vermont" (1975) indicates that "Lake St. Catherine is a large, long lake of 930 acres (376 ha) which begins at the Lily Pond in Poultney and drains south into Wells. The lake has a maximum depth of 68 feet, an average depth of 32.2 feet, and a volume of 36,937,000 m^{3} (1.304417845×10^{9} cu ft). "It is about five miles long and drains into a narrow channel which connects it with Little Pond. "Little Pond is a shallow lake of about 181 acres (73 ha), with an average depth of two feet, a maximum depth of only four feet and a volume of 447,000 m^{3} (15,785,656 cu ft).

== Demographics ==
Historical population
| Census | Pop. | Note | %± |
|---|---|---|---|
| 1790 | 622 | | — |
| 1800 | 978 | | 57.2% |
| 1810 | 1,040 | | 6.3% |
| 1820 | 986 | | −5.2% |
| 1830 | 880 | | −10.8% |
| 1840 | 740 | | −15.9% |
| 1850 | 804 | | 8.6% |
| 1860 | 642 | | −20.1% |
| 1870 | 483 | | −24.8% |
| 1880 | 665 | | 37.7% |
| 1890 | 621 | | −6.6% |
| 1900 | 606 | | −2.4% |
| 1910 | 569 | | −6.1% |
| 1920 | 521 | | −8.4% |
| 1930 | 515 | | −1.2% |
| 1940 | 420 | | −18.4% |
| 1950 | 487 | | 16.0% |
| 1960 | 419 | | −14.0% |
| 1970 | 560 | | 33.7% |
| 1980 | 815 | | 45.5% |
| 1990 | 902 | | 10.7% |
| 2000 | 1,121 | | 24.3% |
| 2010 | 1,150 | | 2.6% |
| 2020 | 1,214 | | 5.6% |
U.S. Decennial Census

As of the census of 2000, there were 1,121 people, 466 households, and 334 families residing in the town. The population density was 49.7 people per square mile (19.2/km^{2}). There were 857 housing units at an average density of 38.0 per square mile (14.7/km^{2}). The racial makeup of the town was 98.66% White, 0.36% African American, 0.09% Native American, 0.36% from other races, and 0.54% from two or more races. Hispanic or Latino of any race were 0.98% of the population.

There were 466 households, out of which 26.2% had children under the age of 18 living with them, 58.8% were married couples living together, 8.6% had a female householder with no husband present, and 28.3% were non-families. 23.2% of all households were made up of individuals, and 11.8% had someone living alone who was 65 years of age or older. The average household size was 2.41 and the average family size was 2.80.

In the town, the population was spread out, with 22.2% under the age of 18, 5.7% from 18 to 24, 25.2% from 25 to 44, 28.4% from 45 to 64, and 18.6% who were 65 years of age or older. The median age was 43 years. For every 100 females, there were 95.6 males. For every 100 females age 18 and over, there were 92.5 males.

The median income for a household in the town was $32,361, and the median income for a family was $41,023. Males had a median income of $30,921 versus $21,842 for females. The per capita income for the town was $16,280. About 6.8% of families and 11.8% of the population were below the poverty line, including 16.5% of those under age 18 and 12.4% of those age 65 or over.

== Notable people ==
- Tom Peters, business guru and author (In Search of Excellence)
- E. B. Ward, 19th-century American industrialist, spent part of his childhood here

== Education ==
- Wells Village School - Educates learners grades kindergarten through 6th grade.
