= Vermont Route 30 =

State highway in Vermont, US

Vermont Route 30
- Seth Warner Memorial Highway; Stone Valley Byway
- VT 30 highlighted in red

Route information
- Maintained by VTrans
- Length: 111.870 mi (180.037 km)

Major junctions
- South end: US 5 / VT 9 in Brattleboro
- VT 100 in Jamaica; US 7 in Manchester; US 4 in Castleton
- North end: US 7 / VT 125 in Middlebury

Location
- Country: United States
- State: Vermont
- Counties: Windham, Bennington, Rutland, Addison

Highway system
- State highways in Vermont
← VT 26	→ VT 30A
← Route 28	N.E.	→ Route 30A

Vermont Route 30 (VT 30) is a 111.870-mile-long (180.037 km) north–south state highway in the U.S. state of Vermont. VT 30 runs from U.S. Route 5 (US 5) and VT 9 in Brattleboro to US 7 and VT 125 in Middlebury. The northern portion, from Poultney to Middlebury, was part of the New England road marking system's Route 30, from which VT 30 got its number. The route passes through many historic small towns, and travel writers such as those at Southern Vermont have described the route as "idyllic" and "picturesque".

== Route description ==
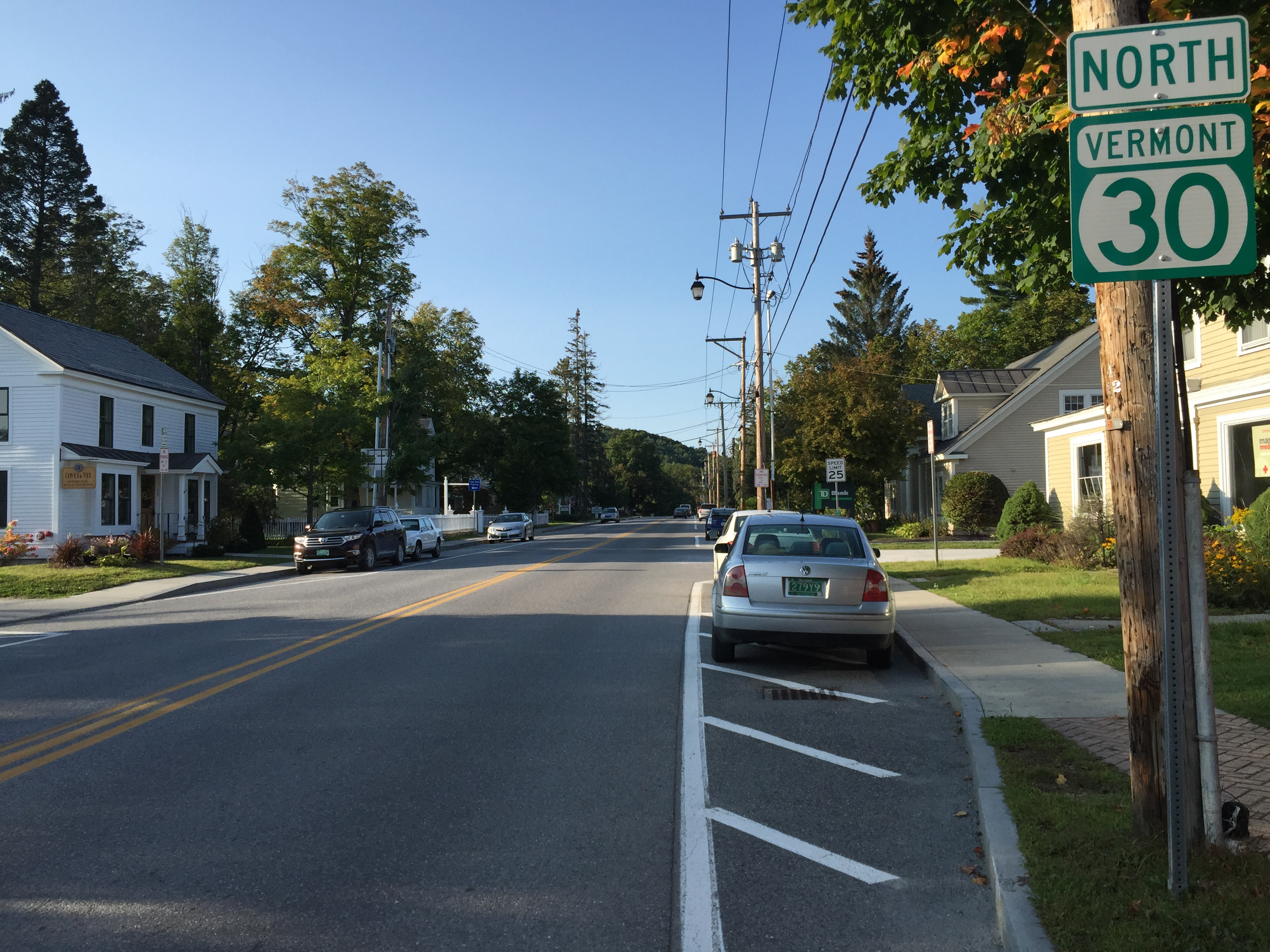
View north along VT 30 in Manchester Center

VT 30 starts in a residential neighborhood in Brattleboro and begins to follow the West River northwest through West Dummerston, Newfane, Townshend, and Jamaica. At Jamaica, the route climbs out of the West River valley and into Winhall, passing close to Stratton Mountain and Bromley Mountain ski areas. The route then joins VT 11 and proceeds southwest down the western slopes of the Green Mountains into Manchester, where it has an interchange with US-7. At the roundabout in Manchester Center, it again turns northwest, following the Mettawee River Drainage through the Taconic Mountains in the towns of Dorset, Pawlet, and Wells. In Poultney, VT 30 passes along the eastern edge of Lake St. Catherine State Park. At Poultney, VT 30 takes on a northerly course, then crosses US-4 in Castleton. To the north in Hubbardton, VT 30 runs along the eastern shore of Lake Bomoseen. It then continues almost due north with panoramic views of the Green Mountains and Adirondacks along a hilltop through pasture land in the towns of Sudbury, Whiting, and Cornwall. VT 30 then descends and turns northeast, following North Main Street past Middlebury College into a residential section of Middlebury, where it soon terminates at a roundabout with VT 125.

== History ==

From 1922 until 1926, New England Route 30 (part of the New England road marking system) ran from Granville, New York, through Poultney (via New York State Route 22A), continuing north through Burlington, to Alburg. The northern sections of Route 30 were assigned in 1926 to U.S. Route 7 (US 7) from Middlebury to Burlington, and to US 2 from Burlington to Alburg. Soon afterwards, Vermont extended the Route 30 designation southeast to its current Brattleboro terminus. (VT 30 to Brattleboro had been in place by 1933.) In August 2011, Hurricane Irene heavily damaged large sections of VT 30 and made it impassable for a period of time.

== Major intersections ==
County	Location	mi	km	Destinations	Notes
Windham	Brattleboro	0.000	0.000	US 5 / VT 9 to I-91 – Guilford, Putney	Southern terminus
Windham	Townshend	16.391	26.379	VT 35 north – Athens, Grafton	Southern terminus of VT 35
Windham	Jamaica	22.375	36.009	VT 100 south – Wardsboro, Wilmington	Southern end of VT 100 concurrency
Windham	Jamaica	30.511	49.103	VT 100 north – South Londonderry, Londonderry, Magic Mountain Ski Area	Northern end of VT 100 concurrency
Bennington	Winhall	39.474	63.527	VT 11 east – Bromley Ski Area, Peru, Londonderry, Magic Mountain Ski Area	Southern end of VT 11 concurrency
Bennington	Manchester	44.321– 44.560	71.328– 71.712	US 7 – Rutland, Bennington	Partial cloverleaf interchange; exit 4 on US 7
Bennington	Manchester	45.877	73.832	VT 7A south – Manchester Village VT 11 ends	Roundabout; southern end of VT 7A concurrency; western terminus of VT 11; former US 7
Bennington	Manchester	45.915	73.893	VT 7A north – Rutland	Northern end of VT 7A concurrency
Bennington	Rupert	54.021	86.938	VT 315 west – Rupert, Salem NY	Eastern terminus of VT 315
Rutland	Pawlet	60.248	96.960	VT 133 north – Middletown Springs, West Rutland	Southern terminus of VT 133
Rutland	Pawlet	64.592	103.951	VT 153 west – West Pawlet	Eastern terminus of VT 153
Rutland	Pawlet	65.522	105.447	VT 149 west – Granville NY	Western terminus of VT 149
Rutland	Poultney	75.550	121.586	VT 31 south	Northern terminus of VT 31
Rutland	Poultney	75.634	121.721	VT 140 east – East Poultney	Western terminus of VT 140
Rutland	Castleton	82.169	132.238	VT 4A – Hydeville, Fair Haven, Castleton, West Rutland	
Rutland	Castleton	82.746	133.167	US 4 – Fair Haven, Castleton, Rutland	Diamond interchange; exit 4 on US 4
Rutland	Sudbury	93.483	150.446	VT 144 west – Hortonia	Eastern terminus of VT 144
Rutland	Sudbury	95.735	154.071	VT 73 west – Orwell, Ferry to NY State	Southern end of VT 73 concurrency
Rutland	Sudbury	97.917	157.582	VT 73 east – Brandon	Northern end of VT 73 concurrency
Addison	Cornwall	107.416	172.869	VT 74 west – West Cornwall, Shoreham, Ferry to NY State	Eastern terminus of VT 74
Addison	Middlebury	111.475– 111.612	179.402– 179.622	VT 125 to VT 23 – Weybridge, Bridport, Bridge to NY	Roundabout
Addison	Middlebury	111.870	180.037	US 7 – East Middlebury, Brandon, Vergennes	Northern terminus
1.000 mi = 1.609 km; 1.000 km = 0.621 mi: Concurrency terminus
