= Pawlet, Vermont =

- Town
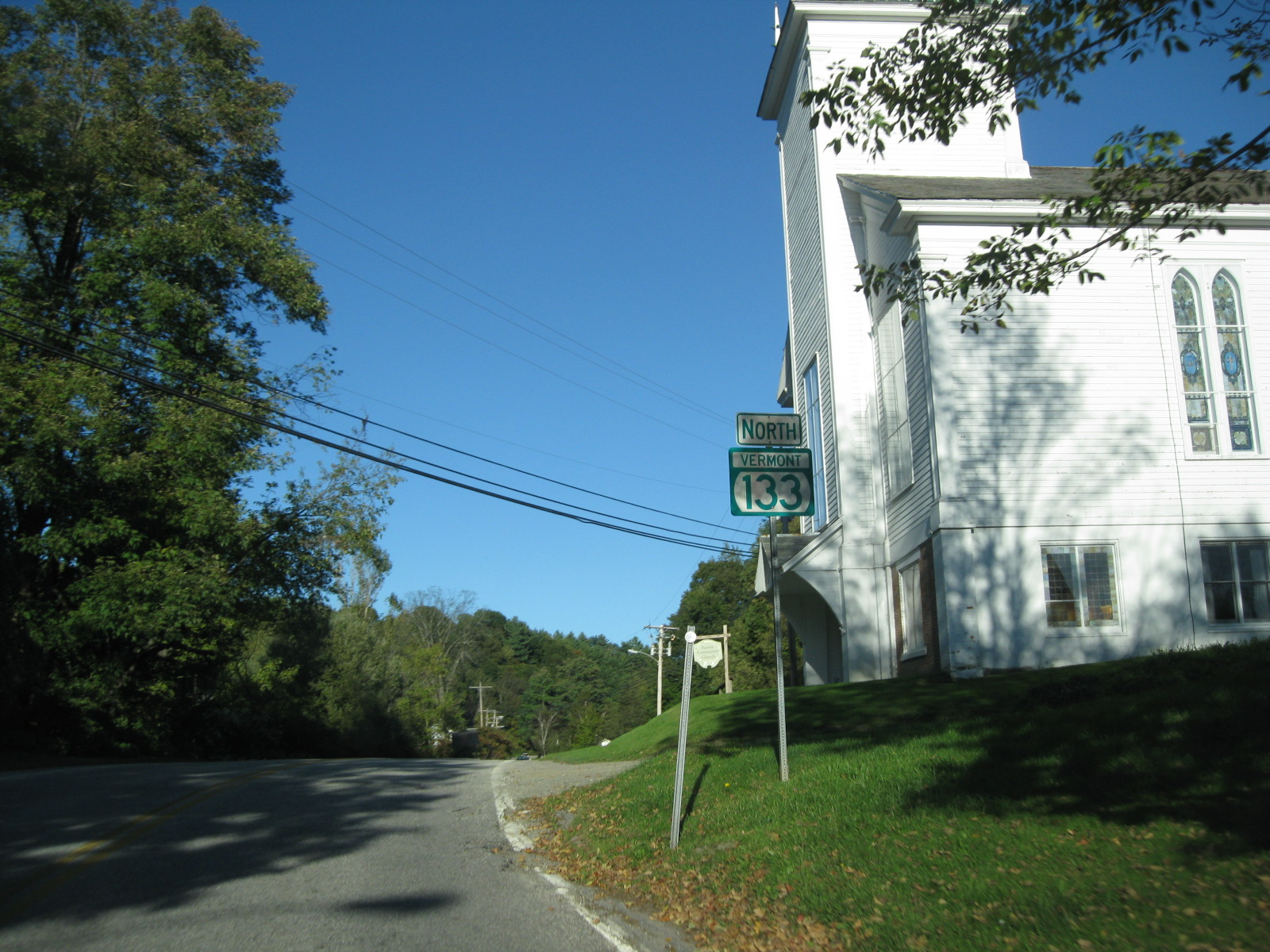
- Vermont Route 133 heading northward through Pawlet

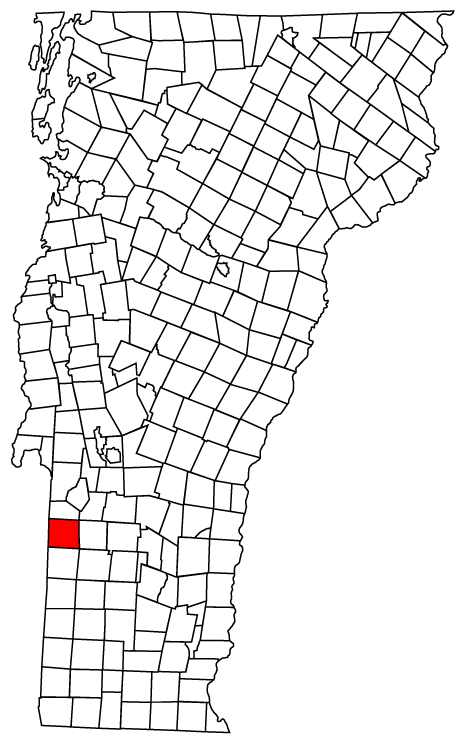
- Pawlet, Vermont
- Coordinates: 43°21′47″N 73°10′38″W
- Country: United States
- State: Vermont
- County: Rutland
- Communities: Pawlet; Blossoms Corners; Brimstone Corners; Butternut Bend; North Pawlet; West Pawlet

Area
  - Total: 42.9 sq mi (111.1 km^{2})
  - Land: 42.9 sq mi (111.1 km^{2})
  - Water: 0 sq mi (0.0 km^{2})
- Elevation: 604 ft (184 m)

Population (2020)
  - Total: 1,424
  - Density: 33.20/sq mi (12.82/km^{2})
- Time zone: UTC-5 (Eastern (EST))
  - Summer (DST): UTC-4 (EDT)
- ZIP Codes: 05761 (Pawlet); 05775 (West Pawlet); 05774 (Wells)
- Area code: 802
- FIPS code: 50-54250
- GNIS feature ID: 1462170
- Website: pawlet.vt.gov

Pawlet is a town in Rutland County, Vermont, United States. The population was 1,424 at the 2020 census.

== History ==
Pawlet was one of the New Hampshire Grants, chartered from Benning Wentworth, Governor of colonial New Hampshire. The charter was granted on August 26, 1761, to Jonathan Willard and 61 other shareholders. The town was named for the Mettawee River, which was called "Paulet" or "Paulette" on the earliest maps of the area that later became Vermont. Nine families lived there at the time of its organization in 1769. It was part of Bennington County until Rutland County was created in 1781.

The first town meeting on record took place on December 22, 1775. Since this meeting was called by town clerk Simeon Burton, it is apparent that Pawlet was already settled by then.

== Geography ==
Pawlet is located in the Taconic Mountains. The town is located on Vermont's western boundary with New York, and adjacent towns include Wells to the north, Danby to the east, Rupert to the south, and Granville and Hebron, New York to the west. The town contains two unincorporated villages: Pawlet in the center of town, and West Pawlet along the western border.

According to the United States Census Bureau, the town has a total area of 42.9 square miles (111 km^{2}), of which 0.02% is water.

Pawlet is a rural farming town. The local school (Mettawee Community School) is about five minutes from downtown Pawlet and downtown West Pawlet.

== Demographics ==
Historical population
Census	Pop.	Note	%±
1790	1,458		—
1800	1,938		32.9%
1810	2,233		15.2%
1820	2,155		−3.5%
1830	1,965		−8.8%
1840	1,748		−11.0%
1850	1,843		5.4%
1860	1,539		−16.5%
1870	1,505		−2.2%
1880	1,696		12.7%
1890	1,745		2.9%
1900	1,731		−0.8%
1910	1,959		13.2%
1920	1,413		−27.9%
1930	1,476		4.5%
1940	1,192		−19.2%
1950	1,156		−3.0%
1960	1,112		−3.8%
1970	1,184		6.5%
1980	1,244		5.1%
1990	1,314		5.6%
2000	1,394		6.1%
2010	1,477		6.0%
2020	1,424		−3.6%
U.S. Decennial Census

As of the census of 2000, there were 1,394 people, 575 households, and 396 families residing in the town. The population density was 32.5 people per square mile (12.5/km^{2}). There were 707 housing units at an average density of 16.5 per square mile (6.4/km^{2}). The racial makeup of the town was 98.85% White, 0.29% African American, 0.65% Native American, and 0.22% from two or more races. Hispanic or Latino of any race were 0.79% of the population.

There were 575 households, out of which 29.4% had children under the age of 18 living with them, 56.5% were married couples living together, 8.5% had a female householder with no husband present, and 31.0% were non-families. 26.1% of all households were made up of individuals, and 11.7% had someone living alone who was 65 years of age or older. The average household size was 2.42 and the average family size was 2.92.

In the town, the population was spread out, with 24.8% under the age of 18, 5.1% from 18 to 24, 27.0% from 25 to 44, 27.3% from 45 to 64, and 15.8% who were 65 years of age or older. The median age was 40 years. For every 100 females, there were 101.2 males. For every 100 females age 18 and over, there were 101.5 males.

The median income for a household in the town was $36,429, and the median income for a family was $42,750. Males had a median income of $27,847 versus $22,262 for females. The per capita income for the town was $20,726. About 8.3% of families and 9.5% of the population were below the poverty line, including 14.0% of those under age 18 and 8.2% of those age 65 or over.

== Notable people ==
- Frederick W. Adams (1786–1858), noted physician, born in Pawlet
- Aaron Clark, Mayor of New York City, 1837–1839, raised in Pawlet from the age of 2
- William Fairfield, businessman and politician in Upper Canada
- Claude Fredericks (1923–2013), resident 1948–2013, Bennington professor, ran the Banyan Press
- Lemuel Chipman, judge and politician
- James Campbell Hopkins, federal judge
- Kirby Flower Smith, classicist and translator
- Joshua C. Stoddard, inventor, born in Pawlet
