= Poultney (village), Vermont =

Poultney, Vermont
- Village
- Location within Vermont Location within the United States
- Coordinates: 43°31′05″N 73°14′09″W
- Country: United States
- State: Vermont
- County: Rutland
- Town: Poultney

Area
  - Total: 0.63 sq mi (1.64 km^{2})
  - Land: 0.63 sq mi (1.63 km^{2})
  - Water: 0.0077 sq mi (0.02 km^{2})
- Elevation: 430 ft (130 m)

Population (2020)
  - Total: 1,079
  - Density: 1,710/sq mi (662/km^{2})
- Time zone: UTC-5 (Eastern (EST))
  - Summer (DST): UTC-4 (EDT)
- ZIP codes: 05741, 05764
- Area code: 802
- FIPS code: 50-56800
- GNIS feature ID: 2378326

Poultney is a village in Rutland County of the U.S. state of Vermont. The village is entirely within the town of Poultney. The population was 1,079 at the 2020 census. Poultney was home to the former Green Mountain College.

== Geography ==
According to the United States Census Bureau, the village has a total area of 0.6 square miles (1.6 km^{2}), all land.

== Demographics ==
Historical population
Census	Pop.	Note	%±
1880	943		—
1890	1,070		13.5%
1910	1,474		—
1920	1,371		−7.0%
1930	1,570		14.5%
1940	1,333		−15.1%
1950	1,685		26.4%
1960	1,810		7.4%
1970	1,914		5.7%
1980	1,554		−18.8%
1990	1,731		11.4%
2000	1,575		−9.0%
2010	1,612		2.3%
2020	1,079		−33.1%
U.S. Decennial Census

As of the census of 2000, there were 1,575 people, 524 households, and 290 families residing in the village. The population density was 2,424.6 people per square mile (935.6/km^{2}). There were 573 housing units at an average density of 882.1/sq mi (340.4/km^{2}). The racial makeup of the village was 95.62% White, 1.21% Black or African American, 0.32% Native American, 1.78% Asian, 0.19% from other races, and 0.89% from two or more races. Hispanic or Latino of any race were 0.70% of the population.

There were 524 households, out of which 27.5% had children under the age of 18 living with them, 41.0% were married couples living together, 9.7% had a female householder with no husband present, and 44.5% were non-families. 36.5% of all households were made up of individuals, and 16.2% had someone living alone who was 65 years of age or older. The average household size was 2.18 and the average family size was 2.87.

In the village, the population was spread out, with 17.0% under the age of 18, 34.4% from 18 to 24, 21.8% from 25 to 44, 14.2% from 45 to 64, and 12.6% who were 65 years of age or older. The median age was 24 years. For every 100 females, there were 91.8 males. For every 100 females age 18 and over, there were 92.9 males.

The median income for a household in the village was $27,143, and the median income for a family was $37,857. Males had a median income of $30,074 versus $24,063 for females. The per capita income for the village was $13,114. About 11.9% of families and 15.8% of the population were below the poverty line, including 17.3% of those under age 18 and 7.1% of those age 65 or over.

== Notable people ==
- Oliver Cowdery, early leader of the Latter Day Saint Movement and associate of Joseph Smith
- Horace Greeley, newspaper editor, reformer and politician
- George Jones, co-founder of The New York Times
