= Mettawee River =

River in Vermont and New York, United States

Coordinates: 43°32′02″N 73°24′12″W

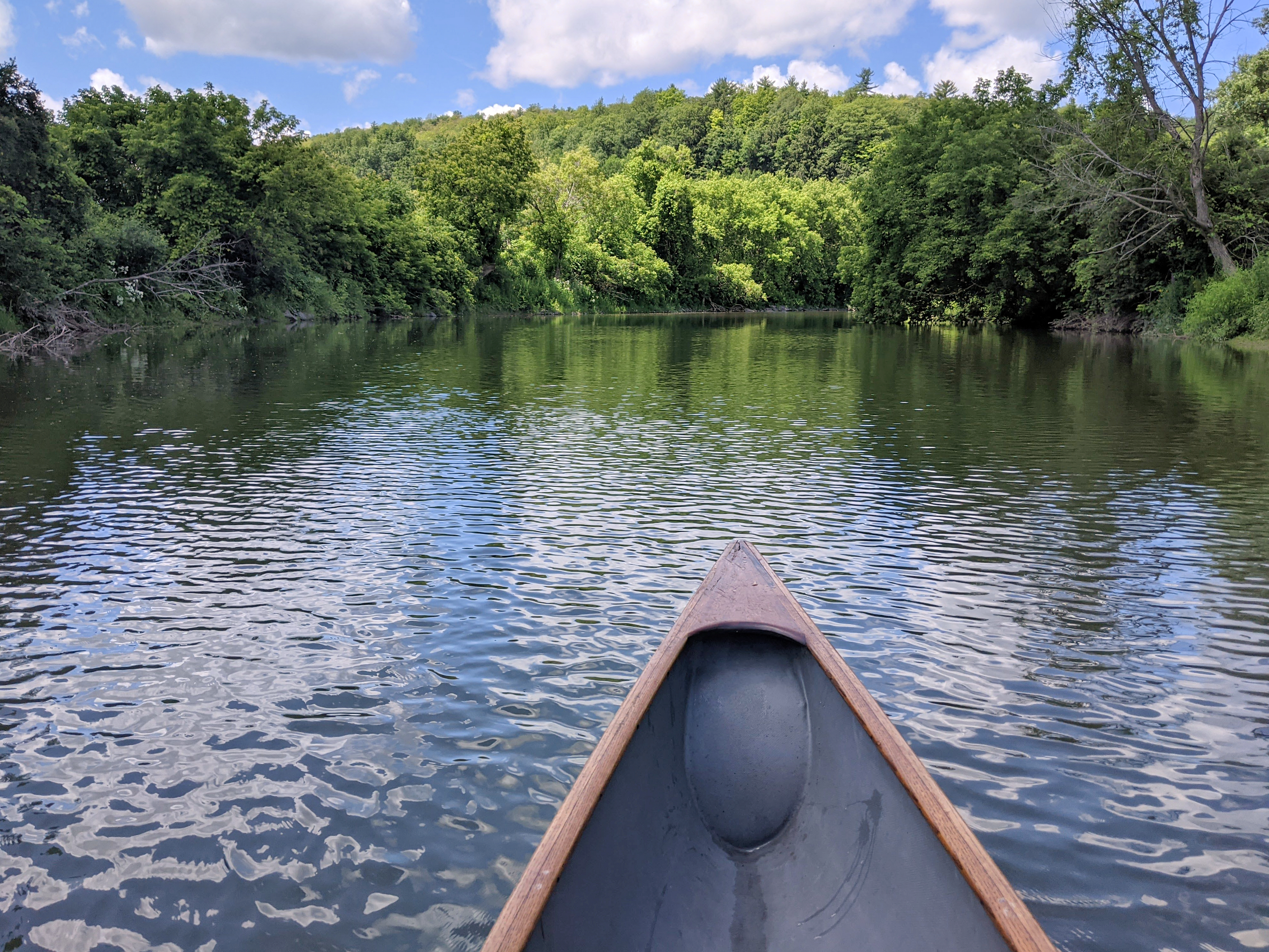
The Mettawee River near Whitehall, NY.

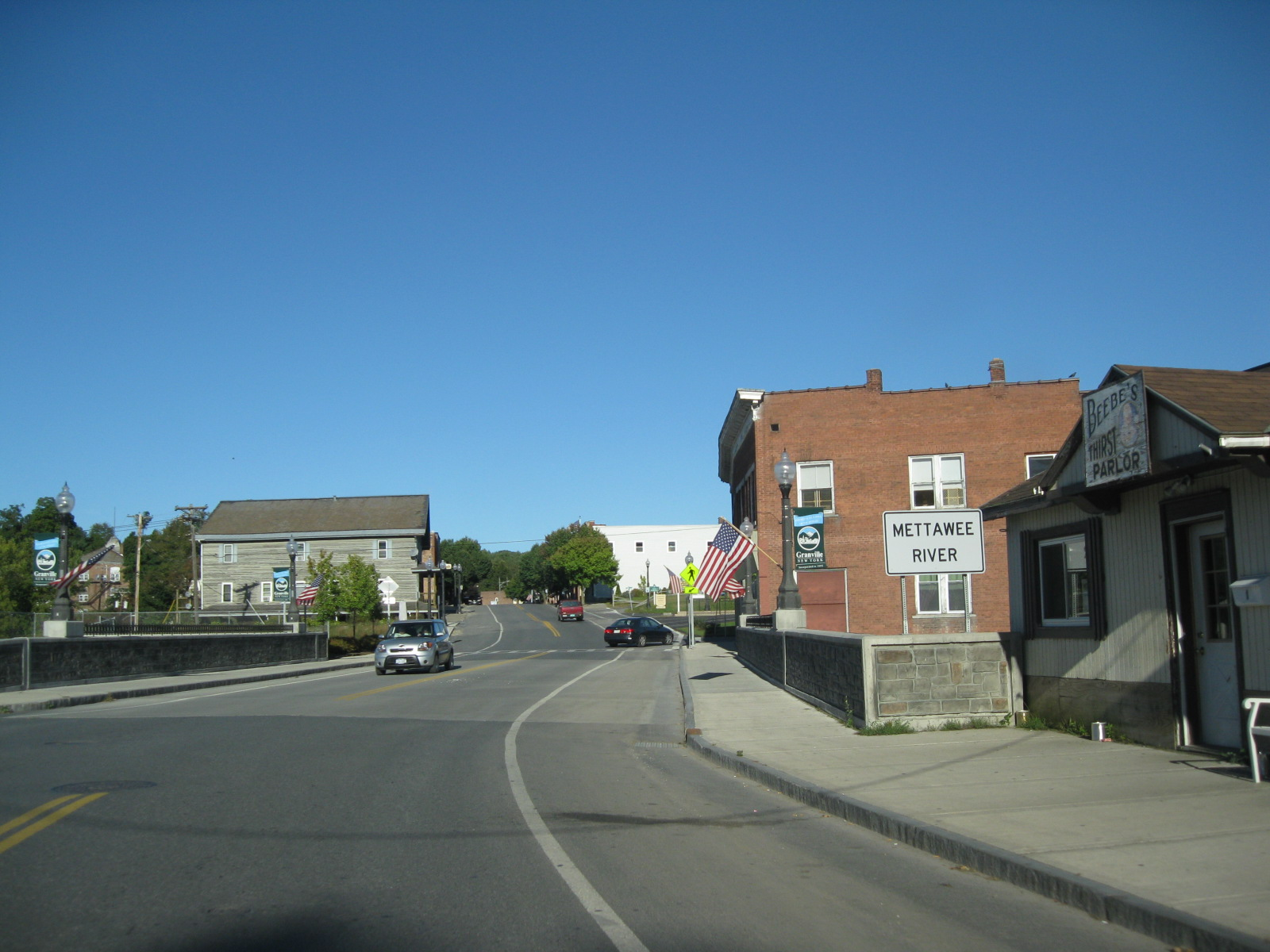
New York State Route 149 crosses the Mettawee in Granville.

The Mettawee River (sometimes spelled "Mettowee River") is a tributary of Lake Champlain in western Vermont and eastern New York in the United States. From its source at the southern slopes of Dorset Mountain, Vermont, the river flows northwards for 47 miles, flowing through Mettawee Valley in Vermont and passing the town of Granville, New York before emptying into Lake Champlain. It has a drainage basin of 168 square miles, with an average discharge of 254 cubic feet (7.2 m^{3}) per second.

The river is a popular attraction for rapids, kayaking, and fly fishing

== History ==
The Mettawee River got its name from the Algonquin tribe living alongside the river, although its exact origin is unknown. Suggestions of the name origin include being from an Algonquin language meaning “furthest away,” a derivation from the Massachusett language for "poplar tree," or from Abenaki for the junction of two rivers.

== See also ==
- List of rivers of New York
- List of rivers of Vermont
