= Mallender =

Mallender is a surname. Notable people with the surname include:

- Ken Mallender (born 1943), English footballer
- Neil Mallender (born 1961), English cricketer and umpire

== See also ==
- Mallinder
- Millender
