= Belevi Mausoleum =

Hellenistic tomb in Turkey

Coordinates: 38°00′53.1″N 27°28′19.7″E

The Belevi Mausoleum, also known as the Mausoleum at Belevi is a Hellenistic monument tomb located in Turkey. The intended occupant of the tomb may have been Antigonus Monophthalmus (r. 323-301) or Lysimachus (r. 323-281), and it may subsequently have been the burial place of the Seleucid king Antiochus II Theos (r. 261–246 BC).

== Location of Mausoleum ==
The Belevi Mausoleum was a grandiose tomb. The name of the mausoleum derives from the modern village of Belevi where the monument is located and sits on an isolated hillside. The mausoleum is located 14 km northeast of Ephesus next to the modern highway from İzmir to Aydın in the eastern part of the Kaystros-valley close to the ancient estates of the Ephesian sanctuary of Artemisia; is 16 km or 10 miles northeast of Selçuk and is 29 km from Kuşadası.

== Dating ==
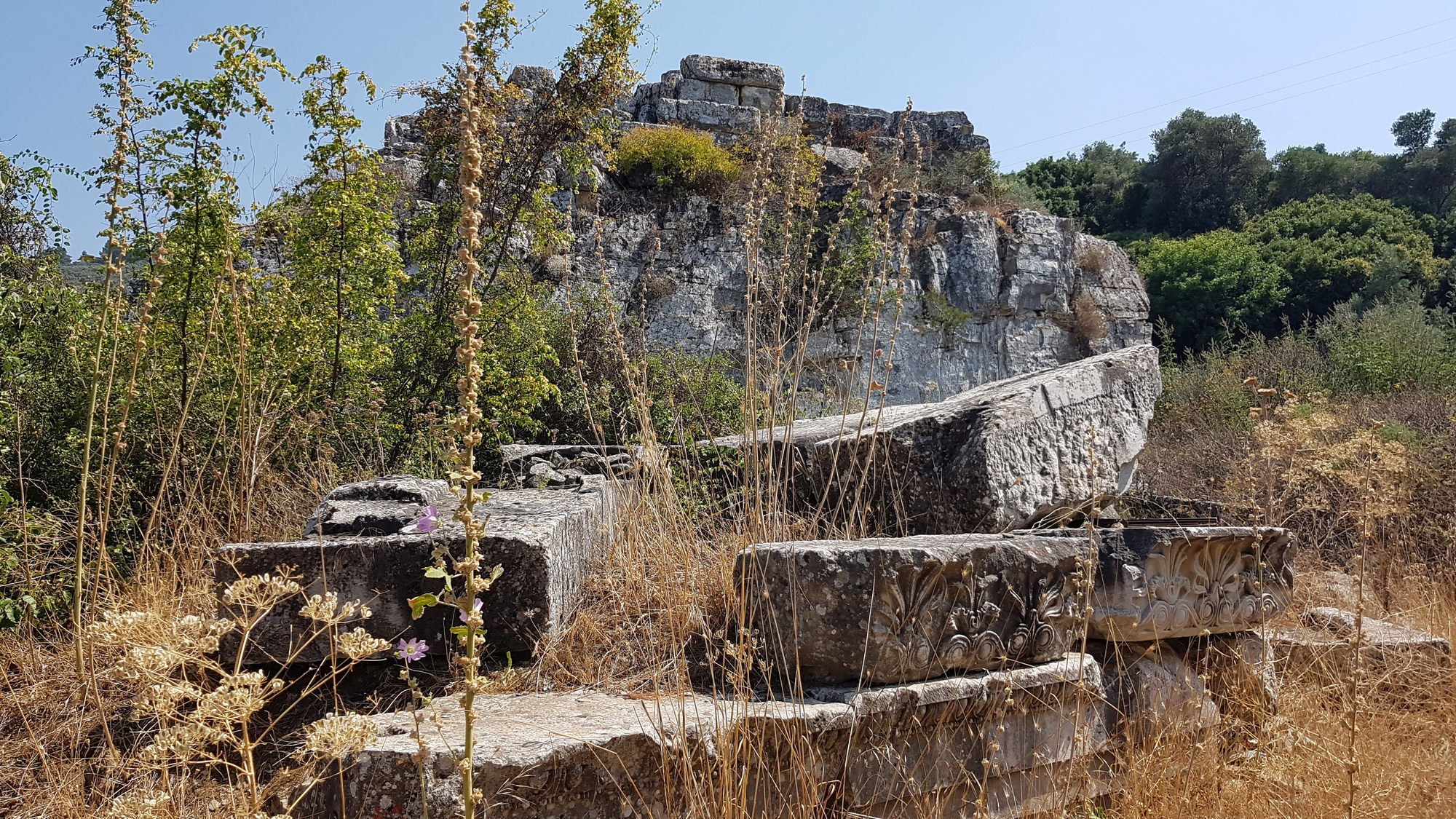
Belevi Mausoleum

The Belevi Mausoleum is the second largest mausoleum in Anatolia after the Mausoleum of Halicarnassus which it resembles and was possibly modeled after. The influence of this tomb seems to have been widespread throughout the Hellenistic world directly or indirectly in the construction of other royal tombs. It is unclear to whom the mausoleum should be attributed. Some posit that it was first erected as a royal tomb by Antigonos Monophthalmus or Lysimachus, two of the Diadochi or successors of Alexander the Great, who ruled western Asia Minor in the late fourth century BC. There is also disagreement regarding the dating of the monument, and views regarding its origin range from the 4th to the 1st centuries BC. Praschniker and Theuer, the authors of the original publication on the site, composed a table of previous attributions and dates and concluded that the construction of the mausoleum was originally for Lysimachus around 301 - 281 BC, but was interrupted when he died and was buried elsewhere, in the Greek colony of Thracian Chersonesos. The tomb was finally used in 246 BC by Laodice I who buried her husband Antiochus II there after he died mysteriously while visiting her, and various ornaments were added. Shortly after this the area came under Ptolomaic control and the complex was once again left incomplete. Some have dated the mausoleum to 333 BC, based on the assumption that it was the tomb of the admiral Memnon of Rhodes, who in that year died in a naval encounter before Lesbos. Others who may have owned the tomb were the brothers of Memnon: Mentor of Rhodes (died 333 BC) or Menandros (died shortly after 318 BC).

== Architecture and decoration ==
The Belevi Mausoleum has only recently received thorough publication, though articles and discussions on individual features of the monument have been written since the 1930s. The materials used for the construction of the mausoleum were probably sourced locally, for example marbles used for the construction of the monument were likely quarried in the region of Ephesus. An estimated two-thousand five-hundred cubic meters of marble were extracted for the building of the mausoleum.

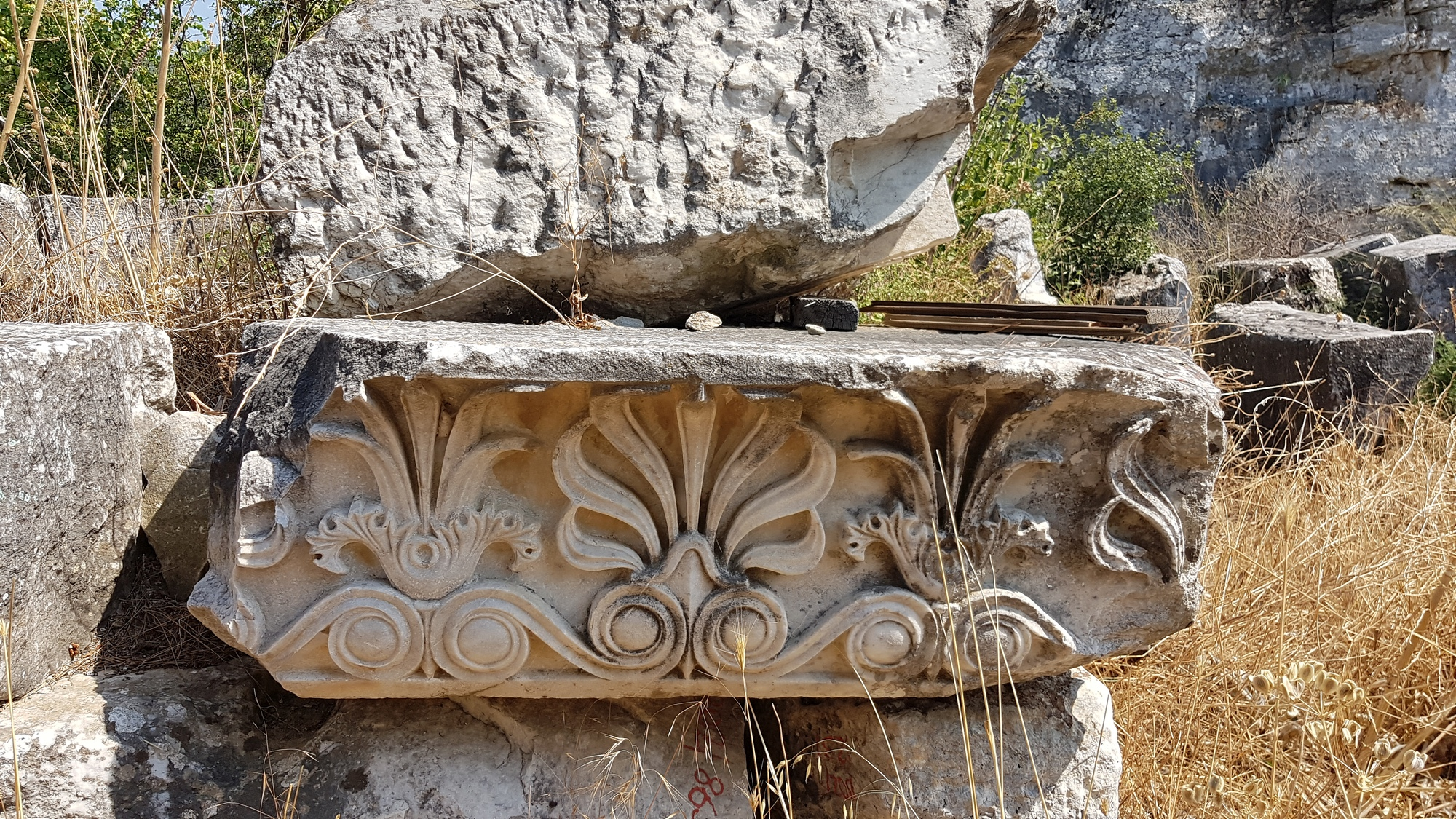
Architectural fragment with decoration from Belevi Mausoleum

The foundation of the mausoleum was a square outcrop of natural rock; each side measuring some 29.65 m, suggesting a length of 100 feet of 0.2965 m. The mausoleum was two stories. On the ground level there were three steps supporting the base mouldings. Each plain socle was surmounted by torus, cavetto and Lesbian cyma. Ten courses of large neatly cut ashlars, 69–88 cm high, which constituted the facing of the podium, made for a total height of 11.37 m. A low architrave, 45 cm high, and a higher Doric frieze of triglyphs and metopes ran around the top of the podium. The south side had a deep recess that was cut into the rock core for the burial chamber, which was placed in the center and sealed from outside. This was done in order to conceal what was in the monument and to protect the monument from tomb raiders. The chamber which Antiochus II was buried in was a small vestibule with a rectangular back room for his body to be put in a barrel-vault. There was an unfinished false door on the north side of the structure. The top story had 3 steps measuring 1.12 m high. The top slope served as a stylobate for a Corinthian Peristalsis, with eight columns on each side. The roof had flat marble tiles.

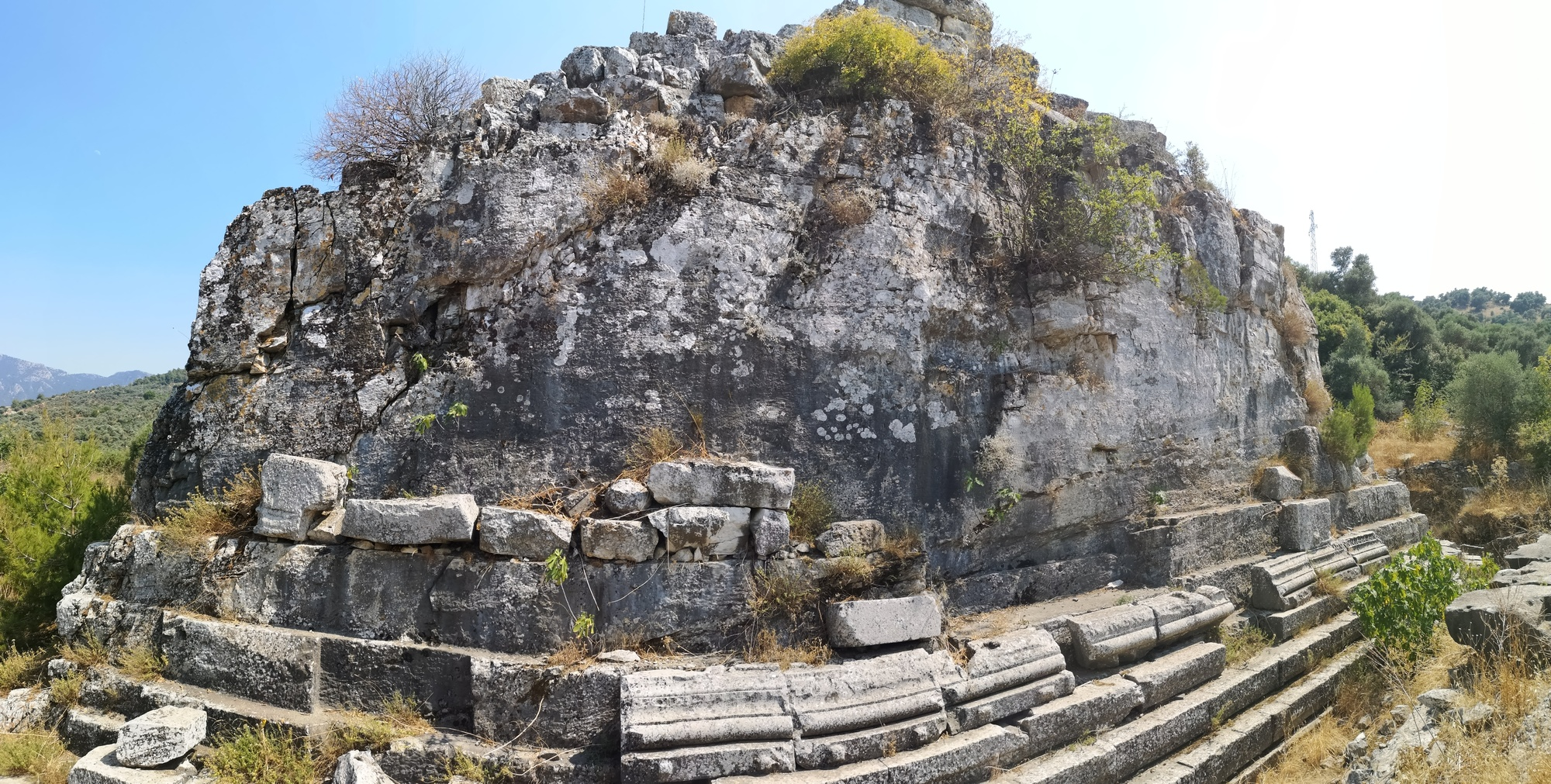
Belevi Mausoleum

Around the edge of the roof, were groups of Lion-Griffins figures facing large stone vases. Pairs of horses were placed at the corners. Little has survived from the mausoleum's roof. Antiochus II's mausoleum may have been a step pyramid with a crowning finial on top. The blocks of the outer architrave bore this Greek inscription:

ΗΛΙΑΔΕΣ ΖΕΥΣ ΦΑΕΔΩΝ ΑΦΡΟΔΙΤΗ
Heliades Zeus Phaedon Aphrodite

There could have been fragments of small-scale palm leaf capital with fluted Doric drum fragments. These parts could have decorated the scheme of the interior. The ceiling was embellished with large coffers. The coffers were painted intensively and adorn with panels on the ceiling. The panels facing north represented funeral games with the reliefs of the other sides dealt with a centauromachy. The burial chamber was the central part of the mausoleum. In it was a large unfinished sarcophagus with a reclining beardless male figure on top. The male figure was formerly crowned with a wreath and held a bowl in its right hand which formed together with standing statue of an oriental servant. The oriental servant characterized by his posture and clothes may have been a royal Persian servant or a page representing a banquet scene. Sculptures and architectural pieces found at the monument still bear remains of their painted finish. The frequent painting replaced carving on the architectural mouldings was a practice reminiscent of Macedonian architecture. The work of the mausoleum was never finished. If the monument was completed, it could have reached a height of about 35 m. When Lysimachus first erected the monument, the construction of his mausoleum had been interrupted because he died in battle. When Antiochus II died, Laodice I added in addition architectural and sculptural elements for the monument. In 244 BC, Ephesus and the surrounding region came under the rule of the Ptolemaic dynasty. The period that Laodice I spent on further work on her husband's mausoleum was brief.

The architectural dimensions and designs of the elaborate decorations have Greek and Persian elements. The high square podium with the pyramid on top is non-Greek. Persian influences are strong with some of the sculptural decorations such as the statue of the servant, the roof long-winged Lion-Griffin figures (symbols of the Persian Kings) and the vases. The Griffins and a centauromachy mean the battle between Centaur and Humans. This was a very common theme, which represents the victory of civilization over barbarism. The way the tomb chamber has been erected was Macedonian. Antiochus II was of Greek Macedonian and Persian descent.

The life sized statues of the Lion-Griffin figures are on display at the museums at Izmir and Ephesus. The sarcophagus of Antiochus II is on display at the museum at Selçuk together with two Lions. Fragments of the coffers depicting funeral games and the centauromachy are on display at the museums at Selçuk and Izmir. The human figures, horses and large urns are on display at the museums at Selçuk and Izmir.

== See also ==
- Greek temple

== Bibliography ==
- Belevi Mausoleum at Turkish Archaeological News
- Antiochus II Theos article at Livius.org
- Kusadasi Guide – Historical Places Belevi Mausoleum
- Belevi Mausoleum at Turkish Archaeological News
- E. Trinkl, "Chemical Analysis of Inclusion Fluids – A new method to pinpoint the origin of white marbles, illustrated at the mausoleum at Belevi" Zeitschrift für klassische Archäologie 12 (2007): 45 link
- P.A. Webb, Hellenistic architectural sculpture: figural motifs in western Anatolia and the Aegean Islands, University of Wisconsin Press, 1996
- B.S. Ridway, Prayers in stone: Greek architectural sculpture ca. 600-100 B.C.E., University of California Press, 1999
- D. Facaros & M. Pauls, Turkey, New Holland Publishers, 2000
- B.S. Ridway, Hellenistic sculpture: The styles of ca. 331-200 B.C, University of Wisconsin Press, 2001
- F.E. Winter, Studies in Hellenistic architecture, University of Toronto Press, 2006
- P. Ruggendorfer, Das Mausoleum von Belevi. Vienna, 2016.
