= Mennander =

Mennander is a surname. Notable people with the surname include:

- Carl Fredrik Mennander (1712–1786), Swedish Lutheran archbishop
- Olli Mennander (1936–2012), Finnish diplomat
- Patrik Mennander (born 1976), Finnish singer

== See also ==
- Menander (disambiguation)
