= Dorothy Gill Barnes =

American artist (1927–2020)

- Born: Dorothy Ellen Gill; May 30, 1927; Strawberry Point, Iowa, U.S.
- Died: November 23, 2020 (aged 93); Columbus, Ohio, U.S.
- Occupation(s): Artist, art educator

Dorothy Gill Barnes (born Dorothy Ellen Gill; May 30, 1927 – November 23, 2020) was an American artist. She was known for her use of natural materials in woven and sculpted forms.

== Early life and education ==
Dorothy Ellen Gill was born in Strawberry Point, Iowa, the daughter of Gorda J. Gill, the owner of a furniture store, and Dorothy Moninger Gill. She was the third of four sisters. Her aunt Margaret Moninger was a missionary teacher in Hainan, China.

Barnes attended Coe College and the Minneapolis School of Art, and earned a bachelor's degree and a master's degree (1952) in art education from the University of Iowa. She took a summer course at the Cranbrook Academy of Art while she was a teacher. While teaching at Parsons College in Fairfield, Iowa she met her future husband, a music teacher and composer, Marshall Barnes. They married in 1952, moved to Worthington, Ohio, and raised a family together.

== Career ==
In the late 1960's, Barnes discovered the work of basket maker Dwight Stump. His work with white oak wood inspired her to take her art materials from nature. She began creating small, non-traditional baskets and proceeded to make larger and more complex pieces that used wire, stone, glass and wood. She collected wood from all over Ohio.

Barnes was known for gathering and using natural materials for her woven and sculpted forms, including techniques from woodworking, basketry and tapestry. She made dendroglyphs (also known as arborglyphs), markings on live tree bark, allowed to develop scarring for months or years before using that section of bark in a sculpture. In one case she waited 14 years to harvest the result of her tree sculpting. She credited Kay Sekimachi, Osma Gallinger Tod, and Ed Rossbach among her notable influences.

Barnes' work was shown in solo and group shows at museums and galleries including the Ohio Craft Museum, Society for Contemporary Craft, Racine Art Museum, Center for Art in Wood, Mansfield Art Center, Morris Museum, Columbus Museum of Art, University of Hawaii Art Gallery, Saskatchewan Craft Council, Penland School of Crafts, San Francisco Folk Art Museum, and the Barbican Centre. Her work is in the collections of the Erie Museum of Art, the Mint Museum, the Ohio Craft Museum, the Renwick Gallery of the Smithsonian American Art Museum in Washington, D.C., and the Museum of Arts and Design in New York. The Smithsonian Institution's Archives of American Art has an oral history interview conducted with Barnes in 2003.

Barnes taught at Simpson College and Parsons College as a young woman. She taught at Capital University as an adjunct instructor from 1966 to 1990. She also taught frequently and hosted workshops at the Haystack Mountain School of Crafts in Maine, and the Penland School of Crafts in North Carolina. Her husband was a music professor, and she often made costumes, props and posters for campus musical productions; she also designed covers for his recordings. She taught workshops internationally, in New Zealand, Australia, Denmark, Fiji, and Canada, and across the United States, from Hawaii to New England. She was active in Habitat for Humanity and Central Ohioans for Peace.

== Personal life and death ==
Dorothy Gill married composer Marshall H. Barnes in 1952; she made her own wedding ring in a metal shop at the University of Iowa. They had three sons and a daughter. They lived in Ohio since 1957, when her husband joined the faculty of the Ohio State University.

She died from COVID-19 in Columbus, Ohio, on November 23, 2020, at the age of 93, amidst the COVID-19 pandemic in Ohio.

== Selected awards ==
- Fellowships, Ohio Arts Council (1986, 1994, 1998)
- Lifetime Achievement Award, National Museum of Women in the Arts (1993)
- Fellowship, American Craft Council (1999)
- Ohio Governor's Award for the Arts (1999)
- Fellowship, Minneapolis College of Art and Design (2003)
- Outstanding Artist Educator Award, Penland School of Crafts (2013)
- Lifetime Achievement Award, National Basketry Organization (2015)
- Raymond J. Hanley Award, Greater Columbus Arts Council (2015)
