= Gallinger =

Gallinger is a surname. Notable people with the surname include:

- Don Gallinger (1925–2000), Canadian ice hockey player
- Jacob Harold Gallinger (1837–1918), American politician
- Osma Gallinger Tod (1895–1983), American artist, writer, and arts educator

== See also ==
- Mallinger
