= Josephine Del Deo =

American preservationist (1925–2016)

- Josephine Couch, later Josephine Del Deo, in a 1946 newspaper photograph
- Born: Josephine Alice Couch; October 24, 1925; Pierrepont, New York, USA
- Died: August 25, 2016 (aged 90); Provincetown, Massachusetts, USA
- Other names: Josephine Couch Gallinger, Josephine Breen Del Deo
- Occupations: Preservationist, writer, artist
- Mother: Osma Gallinger Tod

Josephine Del Deo (October 24, 1925 – August 25, 2016), born Josephine Alice Couch, was an American artist, writer, and activist in preserving the Cape Cod National Seashore and the town of Provincetown, Massachusetts.

== Early life ==
Josephine Alice Couch was born in Pierrepont, New York, the only child of artists Frank Byron Couch and Osma Gallinger Tod. She was raised in Michigan, studied violin at the University of Michigan from 1938 to 1943, and graduated from St. Lawrence University.

== Career ==
Del Deo taught at the Tyler School of Art, Temple University, and assisted her mother with the activities of the National Conference of Hand Weavers. She also co-authored books about weaving with her mother, including Rug Weaving for Everyone (1957).

Del Deo moved to Provincetown in 1951. With her husband, she ran two restaurants, Ciro & Sal's, and Sal's Place, and a gift shop selling her handwoven goods. In the 1960s, she joined artist Ross Moffett in successfully opposing development of the Province Lands on Cape Cod. She testified before a Congressional committee on the matter in 1960. She later wrote about that work in Figures in a Landscape: The Life and Times of the American Painter Ross Moffett, 1888-1971 (1994). Other writings by Del Deo included Compass Grass Anthology (1983, with Salvatore Del Deo), and The Watch at Peaked Hill: Outer Cape Cod Dune Shack Life, 1953-2003 (2015).

In 1968, the Del Deos were founders of the Fine Arts Work Center in Provincetown. Josephine Del Deo was part of the efforts to create the Provincetown Heritage Museum in 1976, the Provincetown National Register District in 1989, and the Dune Shacks of Peaked Hill Bars Historic District in 2012. She was president of the Provincetown Symphony Orchestra, founded the local chapter of the ACLU, and raised funds for civil rights and anti-nuclear causes.

== Personal life and legacy ==
Josephine Couch married artist Salvatore Del Deo in 1953. They had a son, Romolo, and a daughter, Giovanna. Both children became artists. The Del Deos were married 63 years when she died after a stroke in 2016, aged 90 years, in Provincetown. "She fought with every fiber of her being to preserve the beauty and character of her adopted hometown", noted a former town official in a eulogy at her funeral. She was posthumously awarded the Rose Dorothea Award by the Provincetown Public Library's board of trustees, as "an internationally recognized writer" and "a passionate advocate of Provincetown's culture heart."

In 2018, the Pilgrim Monument and Provincetown Museum hosted an exhibit, "Creating a Difference: The Del Deo Family of Provincetown: Art and Activism on the Outer Cape", and a performance "Daughter of the Dunes: The Literary Life of Josephine Del Deo", featuring her works. The Del Deo Foundation for the Arts was founded by her husband, son, and daughter-in-law in 2020.
