= Edwin Albert Merritt =

American politician

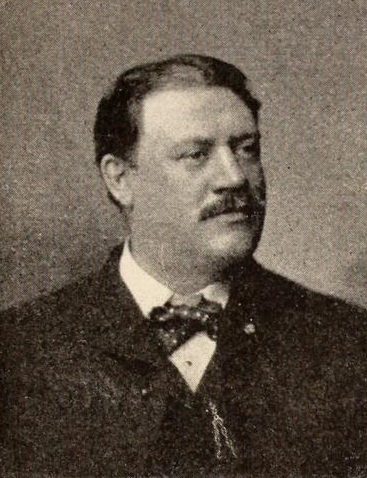

Member of the U.S. House of Representatives from New York
- In office November 5, 1912 – December 4, 1914
- Preceded by: George R. Malby
- Succeeded by: Bertrand Snell
- Constituency: 26th district (1912–1913); 31st district (1913–1914)

Personal details
- Born: July 25, 1860 Pierrepont, New York
- Died: December 4, 1914 (aged 54) Potsdam, New York
- Resting place: Pierrepont Hill Cemetery
- Party: Republican

Edwin Albert Merritt (July 25, 1860 – December 4, 1914) was an American politician from New York who served as a Republican member of the U.S. House of Representatives from 1912 to 1914.

== Biography ==
He was born on July 25, 1860, in Pierrepont, St. Lawrence County, New York, the son of Edwin Atkins Merritt (1828–1916), and was known all his life as Edwin A. Merritt Jr. although father and son had different middle names.

=== Education ===
Merritt Jr. graduated from Yale University in 1884. While at Yale, he was prominent among the undergraduate founders of the Wolf's Head Society, established in 1883 as The Third Society by the Phelps Trust Association. The society was founded with the aid of over 300 Yale alumni, including James Smith Bush, Charles Phelps Taft, Charles W. Harkness and William L. Harkness.

=== Political career ===
Merritt was a member of the New York State Assembly (St. Lawrence Co., 2nd D.), serving in each consecutive legislative session from 1902 through 1912. He was Majority Leader from 1908 to 1910, Minority Leader in 1911, and Speaker in 1912.

He was an alternate delegate to the 1908 Republican National Convention, and a delegate to the 1912 Republican National Convention.

He was elected to the 62nd United States Congress, to fill the vacancy caused by the death of George R. Malby, and was elected at the same time to the 63rd United States Congress, holding office from November 5, 1912, until his death on December 4, 1914, in Potsdam, New York.

He was buried at Pierrepont Hill Cemetery in Pierrepont, N.Y.

== See also ==
- List of members of the United States Congress who died in office (1900–1949)

== Sources ==
- United States Congress. "Edwin Albert Merritt (id: M000660)". Biographical Directory of the United States Congress.
- Edwin A. Merritt, late a representative from New York, Memorial addresses delivered in the House of Representatives and Senate frontispiece 1915

New York State Assembly
Preceded by Benjamin A. Babcock	New York State Assembly; St. Lawrence County, 2nd District; 1902–1912	Succeeded by John A. Smith
Preceded by Sherman Moreland	Majority Leader of the New York State Assembly; 1908–1910	Succeeded by Al Smith
Preceded by Daniel D. Frisbie	Minority Leader in the New York State Assembly; 1911	Succeeded by Al Smith
Preceded by Daniel D. Frisbie	Speaker of the New York State Assembly; 1912	Succeeded by Al Smith
U.S. House of Representatives
Preceded by George R. Malby	Member of the U.S. House of Representatives from New York's 26th congressional district 1912–1913	Succeeded by Edmund Platt
Preceded by Sereno E. Payne	Member of the U.S. House of Representatives from New York's 31st congressional district 1913–1914	Succeeded by Bertrand H. Snell
