= Milind =

Milind is an Indian male given name. Notable people with this name include:

- Milind Chittal, Indian classical vocalist
- Milind Date (born 28 February) is an Indian flautist and music composer who plays the Bansuri
- Milind Deora (born 1976), Indian politician, former Union Minister of State (MoS) for Communications & Information Technology and Shipping
- Milind Ekbote, president of Dharmaveer Sambhaji Maharaj Pratishthan and Samasta Hindu Aghadi
- Milind Gadhavi (born 1985), Gujarati language poet and lyricist from Gujarat, India
- Milind Gawali (born 1966), Indian actor and director
- Milind Gunaji (born 1961), Indian actor, model, television presenter, writer and author
- Milind Gunjal (born 1959), Indian former first-class cricketer
- Milind Ingle, Indian singer and music director from Pen, Maharashtra
- Milind Anna Kamble, Indian politician and member of the Nationalist Congress Party
- Milind Kamble, Indian entrepreneur notable for establishing Dalit Indian Chamber of Commerce and Industry (DICCI)
- Milind Vasant Kirtane, Indian otorhinolaryngologist, reported to have performed the first cochlear implant surgery in Mumbai
- Milind Kumar (born 1991), Indian professional cricketer
- Milind Mane (born 1970), member of the 13th Maharashtra Legislative Assembly
- Chama Milind (born 1994), Indian first-class cricketer plays for Hyderabad cricket team
- Milind Mulick, Indian watercolour painter, teacher and author
- Milind Naik (politician), Indian Politician from the state of Goa
- Milind Rege (born 1949), former Indian first-class cricketer
- Milind Shinde, Indian actor and film director who works in Marathi, Kannada and Hindi films
- Milind Soman (born 1965), Indian actor, supermodel, film producer, and fitness enthusiast
- Milind Tambe, Gordon McKay Professor of Computer Science and Director of Center for Research on Computation and Society at Harvard University
- Milind Teltumbde (died 2021), alias Jeeva or Deepak, Maoist insurgent leader and Central Committee member of CPI (Maoist)
- Milind Vaidya (Marathi: मिलिंद वैद्य) is Shiv Sena Politician from Mumbai

== See also ==
- Anand–Milind, duo of Indian film music composers
- Milind College, group of three coeducational general degree colleges located in Aurangabad, Maharashtra, India
- Millinder
