= Pierrepont Town Buildings =

- U.S. National Register of Historic Places
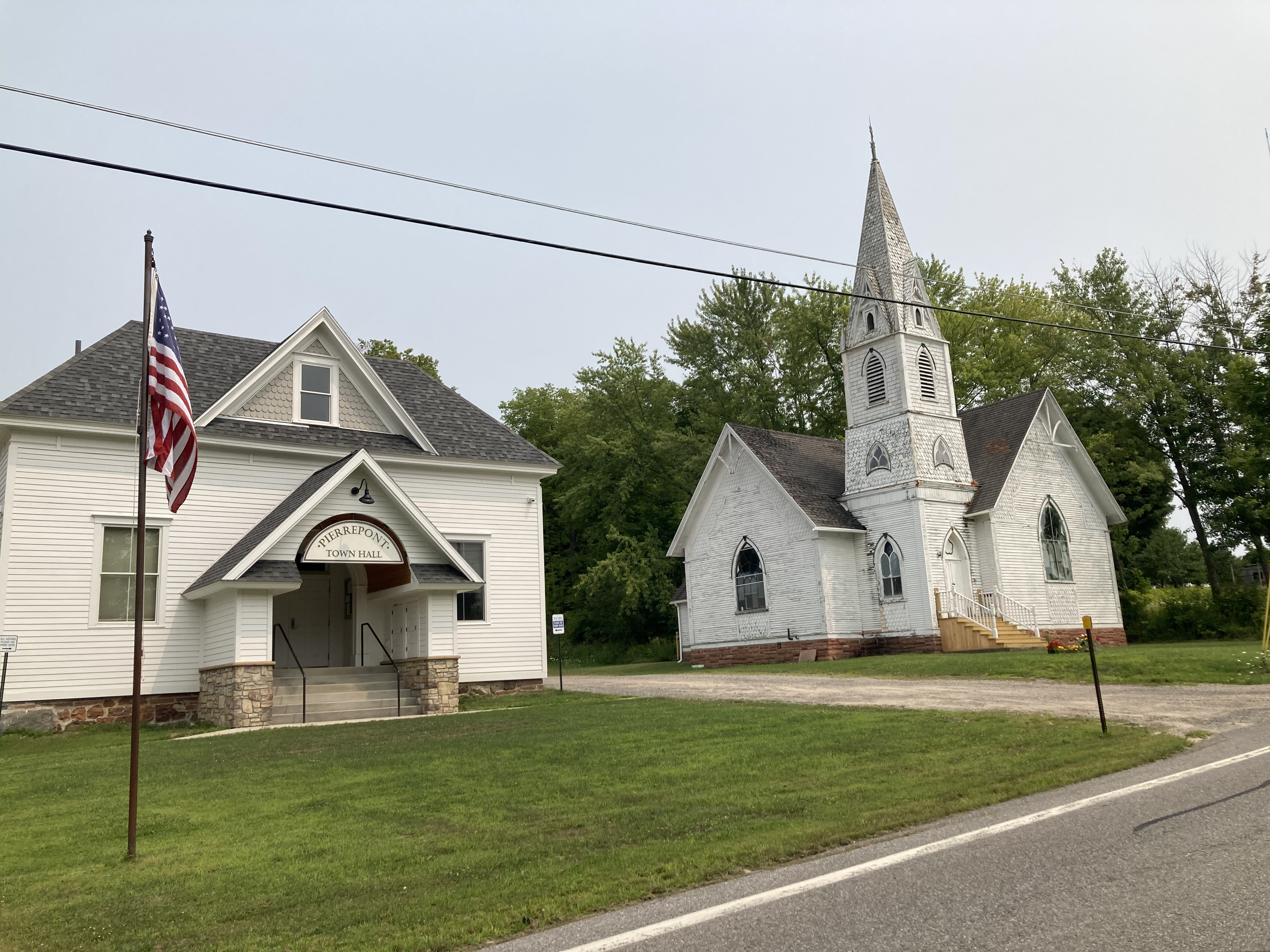
- The town hall (left) and church photographed in 2025.

- Location within New York Location within the United States
- Location: Main St. Pierrepont, New York, U.S.
- Coordinates: 44°32′30″N 75°0′39″W
- Area: 1.5 acres (0.61 ha)
- Built: 1826
- Architectural style: Greek Revival, Queen Anne
- NRHP reference No.: 82001271
- Added to NRHP: November 4, 1982

Pierrepont Town Buildings is a historic town hall and related building complex located at Pierrepont in St. Lawrence County, New York. The complex consists of three buildings: the Pierrepont Town Hall, Pierrepont Museum (District School #2), and Pierrepont Union Church. The Pierrepont Town Hall is a white frame clapboard structure built in 1847 and originally of Greek Revival design. It features an open porch with Greek pediment with four square tapering columns. It was remodeled in 1901 and again in 1953–1955.

The Pierrepont Museum is housed in a former one-room school and is a one-story wood-frame structure built about 1826.

The Pierrepont Union Church is a one-story wood-frame Queen Anne style building with two main gable roofed sections built in the mid-1880s.

It was listed on the National Register of Historic Places in 1982.
