= Pierrepont, New York =

- Town
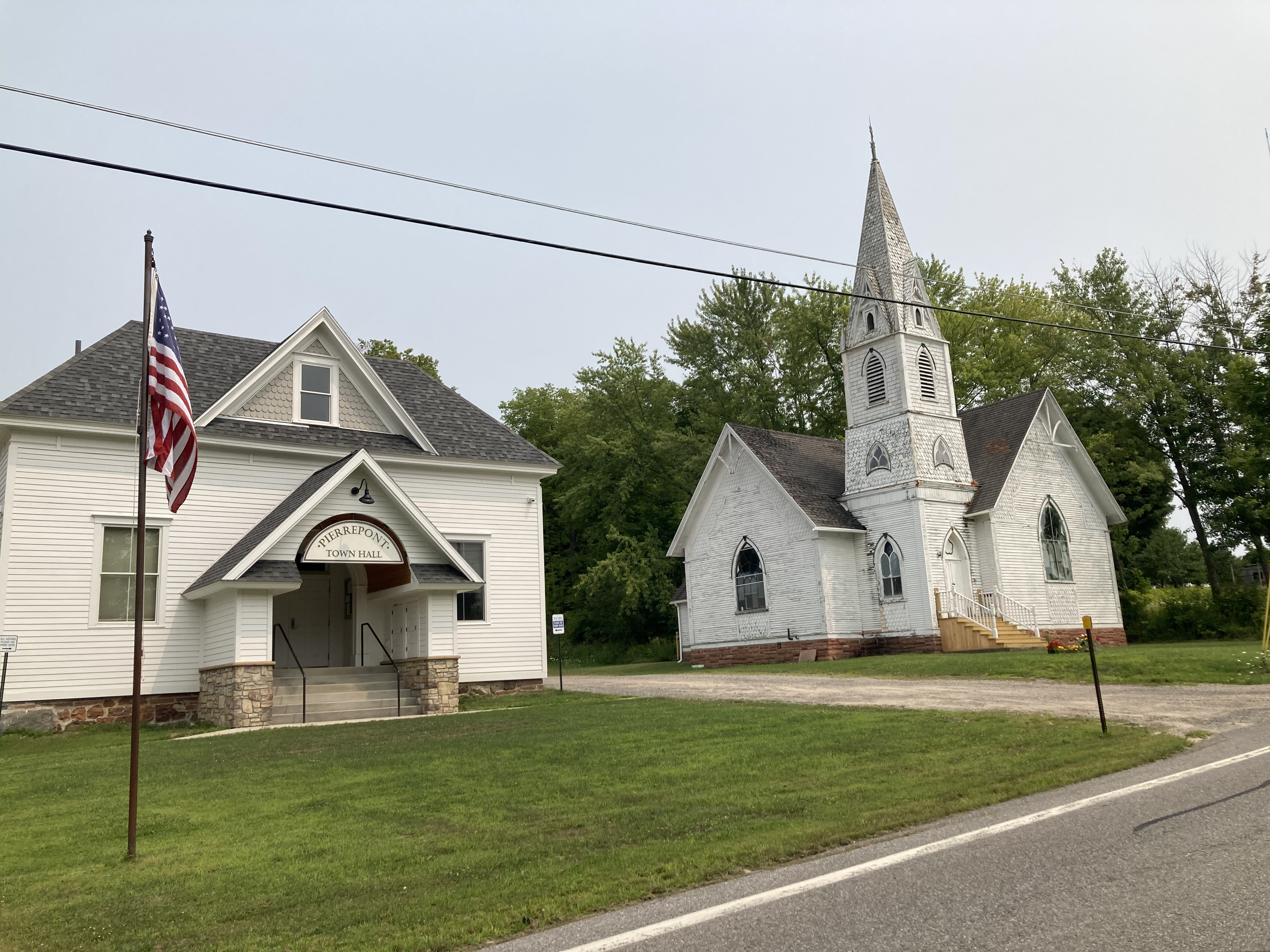
- The Pierrepont Town Hall (left) and the Pierrepont Union Church make up part of the National Register-listed Pierrepont Town Buildings complex.

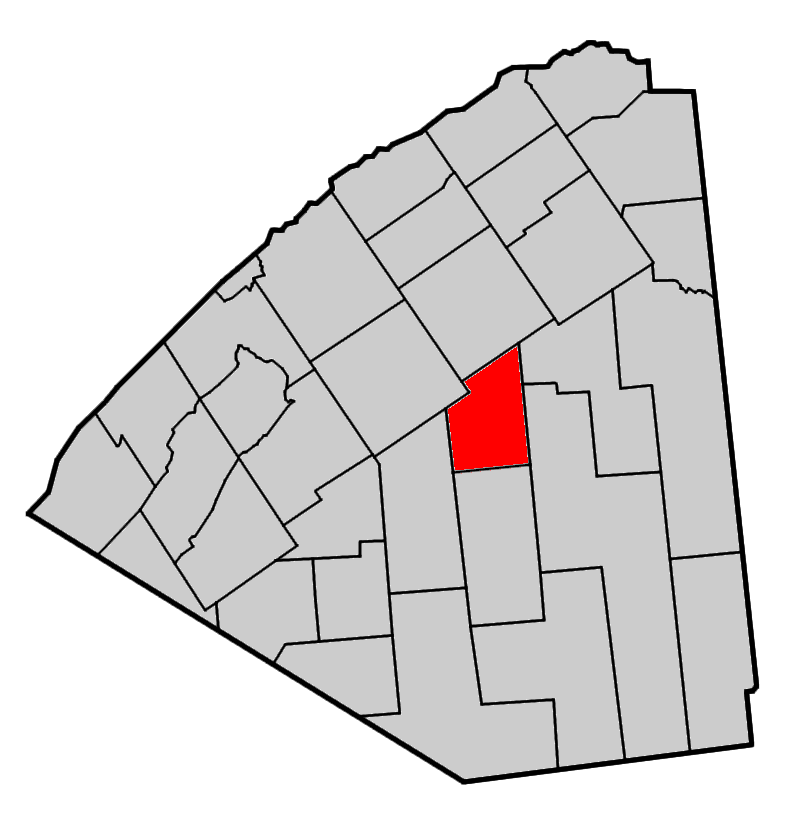
- Map highlighting Pierrepont's location within St. Lawrence County.

- Location within the state of New York
- Coordinates: 44°32′53″N 75°0′44″W
- Country: United States
- State: New York
- County: St. Lawrence

Area
  - Total: 60.72 sq mi (157.26 km^{2})
  - Land: 60.23 sq mi (156.00 km^{2})
  - Water: 0.49 sq mi (1.26 km^{2})
- Elevation: 922 ft (281 m)

Population (2020)
  - Total: 2,523
  - Density: 41.9/sq mi (16.17/km^{2})
- Time zone: UTC-5 (Eastern (EST))
  - Summer (DST): UTC-4 (EDT)
- FIPS code: 36-57771
- GNIS feature ID: 0979365
- Website: Official Town of Pierrepont official website

Pierrepont (traditionally spelled Pierpont) is a town and hamlet in St. Lawrence County, New York, United States. As of the 2020 census, the town population was 2,523. It was named after Hezekiah Pierrepont, the early owner of much of the town's territory. The Town of Pierrepont is centrally located in the county and is southeast of Canton. A hamlet of the same name is in the town of Pierrepont. Pierrepont Manor, however, is located in Jefferson County.

== History ==
The first European-American settlers arrived around 1806/7, after the American Revolutionary War, when many settlers from New England migrated into upstate New York. The town was established in 1818 from parts of the Towns of Russell and Potsdam. Later the town gave up territory to form, in whole or part, the Towns of Fine (1844), Clifton (1868), and Clare (1882).

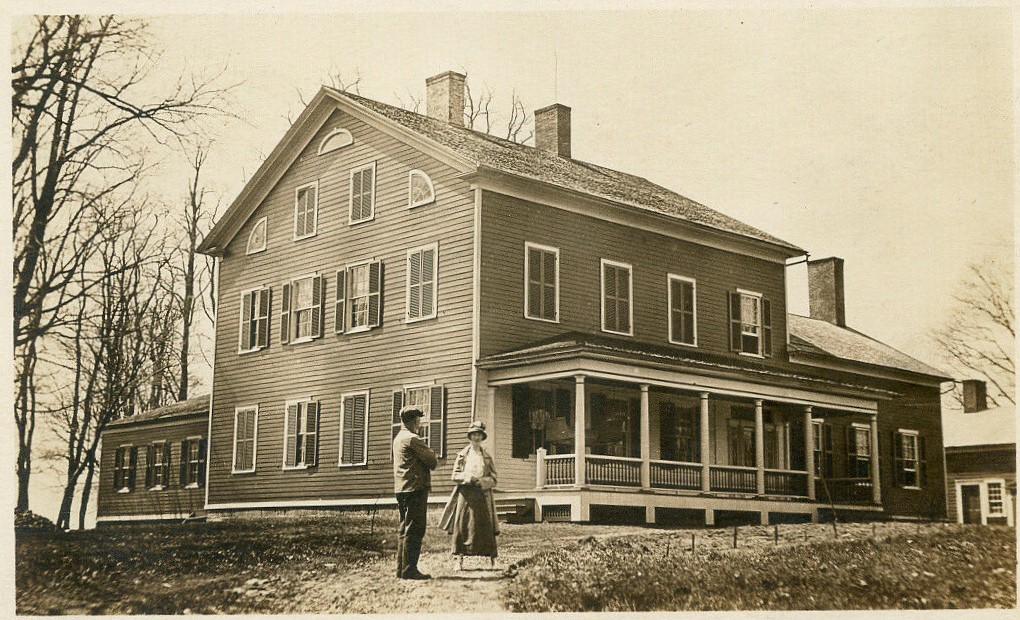
Manor House, Pierrepont, NY - c. 1915

== Geography ==
According to the United States Census Bureau, the town has a total area of 60.7 square miles (157 km^{2}), of which 60.4 square miles (156 km^{2}) is land and 0.3 square miles (0.78 km^{2}) (0.51%) is water.

The Raquette River, which is the longest river in St. Lawrence County and the third longest in New York state, flows through the northeast part of the town.

New York State Route 56 crosses the northeast part of Pierrepont, and New York State Route 68 is an east–west highway.

== Notable people ==
- Josephine Del Deo, artist, activist, and writer.
- Edwin Atkins Merritt, member of the New York State Assembly, Quartermaster General of the New York Militia, Collector of the Port of New York
- Edwin Albert Merritt, U.S. Congressman
- Irving Bacheller, author
- Albert P. Crary, polar geophysicist and glaciologist

== Demographics ==
Historical population
Census	Pop.	Note	%±
1820	235		—
1830	749		218.7%
1840	1,430		90.9%
1850	1,459		2.0%
1860	2,267		55.4%
1870	2,391		5.5%
1880	2,494		4.3%
1890	1,954		−21.7%
1900	1,885		−3.5%
1910	1,628		−13.6%
1920	1,425		−12.5%
1930	1,379		−3.2%
1940	1,312		−4.9%
1950	1,192		−9.1%
1960	1,523		27.8%
1970	1,726		13.3%
1980	2,207		27.9%
1990	2,375		7.6%
2000	2,674		12.6%
2010	2,589		−3.2%
2020	2,523		−2.5%
U.S. Decennial Census

As of the census of 2000, there were 2,674 people, 1,039 households, and 744 families residing in the town. The population density was 44.3 inhabitants per square mile (17.1/km^{2}). There were 1,233 housing units at an average density of 20.4 per square mile (7.9/km^{2}). The racial makeup of the town was 98.77% White, 0.19% African American, 0.15% Native American, 0.52% Asian, and 0.37% from two or more races. Hispanic or Latino of any race were 0.30% of the population.

There were 1,039 households, out of which 33.9% had children under the age of 18 living with them, 61.2% were married couples living together, 6.5% had a female householder with no husband present, and 28.3% were non-families. 21.0% of all households were made up of individuals, and 7.5% had someone living alone who was 65 years of age or older. The average household size was 2.57 and the average family size was 2.99.

In the town, the population was spread out, with 25.9% under the age of 18, 6.5% from 18 to 24, 29.6% from 25 to 44, 27.6% from 45 to 64, and 10.4% who were 65 years of age or older. The median age was 38 years. For every 100 females, there were 106.3 males. For every 100 females age 18 and over, there were 100.3 males.

The median income for a household in the town was $41,890, and the median income for a family was $44,500. Males had a median income of $36,398 versus $23,438 for females. The per capita income for the town was $19,239. About 7.3% of families and 11.5% of the population were below the poverty line, including 13.1% of those under age 18 and 5.6% of those age 65 or over.

== Communities and locations in Pierrepont ==
- Austin's Corners – a location by the southern town line.
- Browns Bridge – a location in the northeastern part of the town over the Raquette River. Previously a steel deck bridge constructed in the 1970s, the bridge was replaced with a more modern design in 2021. The bridge is a popular spot for bridge jumping; a dam and penstock are located at Browns Bridge. County Route 24, also known as the Russell Turnpike Road, goes through Browns Bridge.
- Coney Island – a dead-end roadway in Hannawa Falls located on the Raquette River, which was a small amusement park from the 1920s through the 1940s.
- Crary Mills – a hamlet in the northwestern part of the town at the town line. Crary Mills is located on the town lies of Pierrepont, Colton and Canton; County Route 35 goes through the hamlet. The Crary Mills Mighty Mall houses small specialty shops.
- Dean's Corners – a location in the southwestern part of Pierrepont.
- Hannawa Falls – a hamlet in the eastern part of the town on NY-56. The community was previously called "Cox's Mill", "East Pierrepont", and "Ellsworth". As of 2022, Hannawa Falls has two convenience stores (Chip's Place and the Country Store), a post office (ZIP 13647), the Hannawa Falls Volunteer Fire Department, one restaurant/bar called Jake's, a community park near the old school house on Church Street and the Postwood Park Beach on Postwood Road. Hannawa Pond is a reservoir on the Raquette River in the heart of Hannawa Falls which is a popular place for boating and swimming. Hannawa Pond is a closed body of water, meaning there is not a public boat launch. Potsdam Central School District covers the Hannawa Falls area after Potsdam absorbed the Hannawa Falls School in the 1970s. State Route 56 travels through the hamlet with County Routes 59 and 24 bordering the hamlet. The Gardner Cox House was listed on the National Register of Historic Places in 1986.
- Moore's Corners – a location in the southwestern part of the town.
- Pierrepont is on NY-68 at County Road 24. The town hall and museum are located here; Pierrepont has its own fire department. The Pierrepont Town Buildings was listed on the National Register of Historic Places in 1982.
- Selleck's Corners – a location in the southeastern part of Pierrepont.
- Vebber Corners – a location in the southeastern part of the town south of Washburn Corners.
- Washburn Corners – a location in the eastern part of the town.
- West Pierrepont – a hamlet in the southwestern part of the town.
- Willisville – a location in the eastern part of Pierrepont.
- Wilson Corners – a location in the southern part of the town, south of Washburn Corners.
- Postwood and 4-H – a popular place to swim, Postwood Park is a small beach located on the Raquette River. In the middle of the 20th century, Postwood had camping grounds. Next to Postwood is a large tract of county-owned land known as 4-H, which was once a popular spot for local 4-H troops. This area is now a popular spot for hiking.
