= Mallinder =

Mallinder is a surname. Notable people with the surname include:

- Harry Mallinder (born 1996), English rugby union player
- Jim Mallinder (born 1966), English rugby union player and coach
- Stephen Mallinder (born 1955), English musician

== See also ==
- Mallinger
- Millinder
