= Sudbury Congregational Church =

Historic church in Vermont, United States

- U.S. National Register of Historic Places
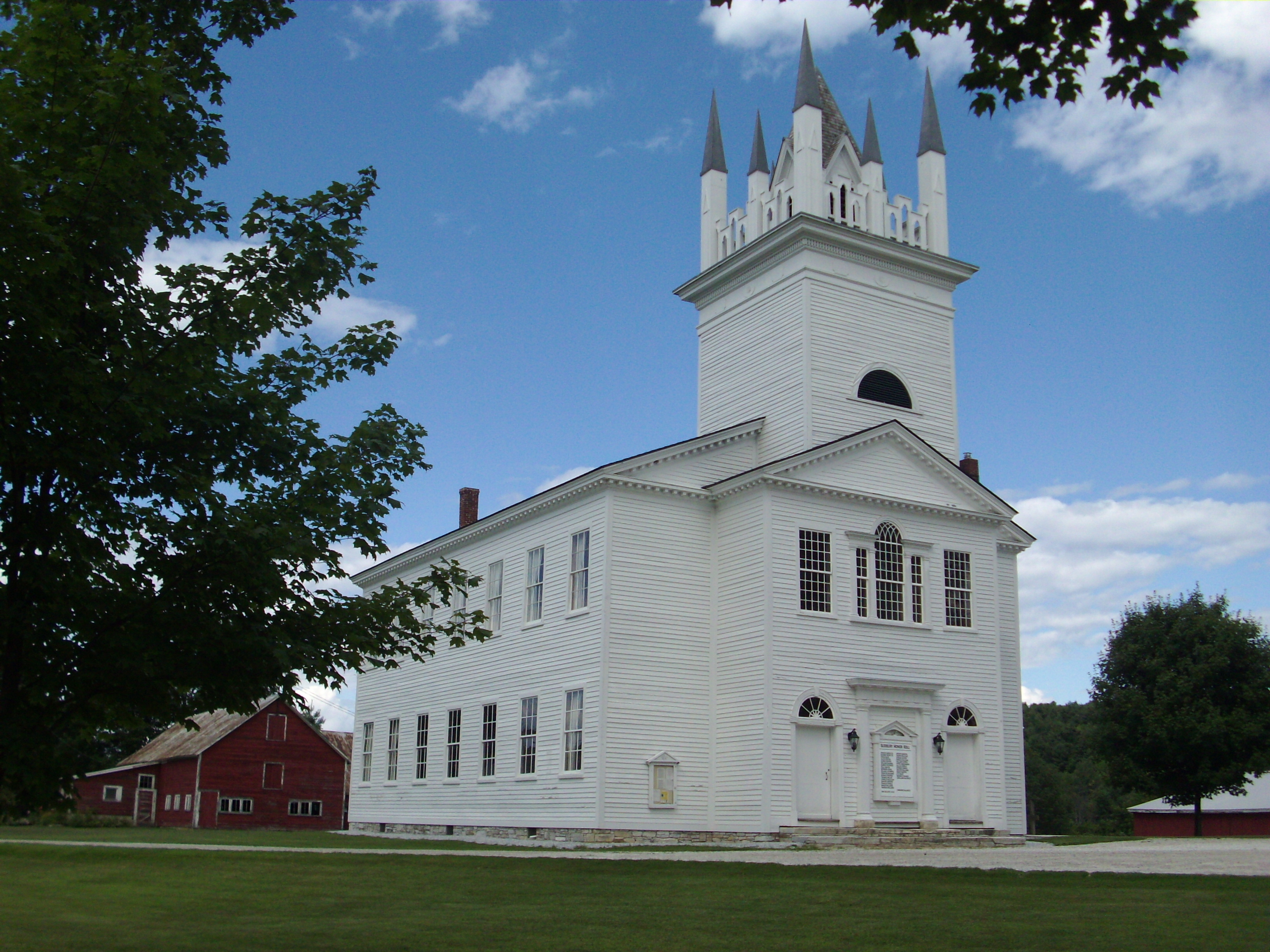
- Sudbury Congregational Church

- Location within Vermont Location within the United States
- Location: VT 30, Sudbury, Vermont
- Coordinates: 43°47′58″N 73°12′15″W
- Area: 1 acre (0.40 ha)
- Built: 1807
- Architect: Stewart, Charles C.
- Architectural style: Federal
- NRHP reference No.: 77000101
- Added to NRHP: October 28, 1977

Sudbury Congregational Church, also known as the Sudbury Meetinghouse, is a historic church and town hall at 2702 Vermont Route 30 in Sudbury, Vermont. When it was built in 1807, it was a nearly exact replica of Plate 33 in Asher Benjamin's 1805 Country Builders Assistant. It was listed on the National Register of Historic Places in 1977.

== Description and history ==
The Sudbury Congregational Church stands in the modest village center of Sudbury, separated from Vermont Route 30 by the village green and accessed via a dirt road on the green's east side. It is a two-story wood frame structure, with a gable roof and clapboard siding. A two-story vestibule projects from the south-facing front facade, with a square tower straddling the transition between the main roof line and that of the vestibule. The tower has a single stage, with a half-round louver on its front face, and Gothic corner pinnacles surrounding a short steeple. The eaves of the main roof, vestibule, and gables are lined with dentil moulding. The entry vestibule has a pair of entrances, each topped by a half-round multilight transom window. In between the entrances is what appears to be an entrance surround, consisting of pilasters supporting a corniced entablature. The framed space is presently occupied by a notice board. On the second level, sash windows flank a central Palladian window.

The church was built in 1807 by Charles C. Stewart, for a congregation organized in 1803. Its tower notably lacked the Gothic features now present, and had a taller steeple, which was reportedly pulled down amid concerns it might be blown off. During the 1850s, the building's interior was adapted to accommodate the municipal functions of the town meeting, and it is then that the exterior Gothic features were added. At the time of its listing on the National Register in 1977, it was still used for both municipal and religious functions.

== See also ==
- National Register of Historic Places listings in Rutland County, Vermont
