= Sudbury, Vermont =

- Town
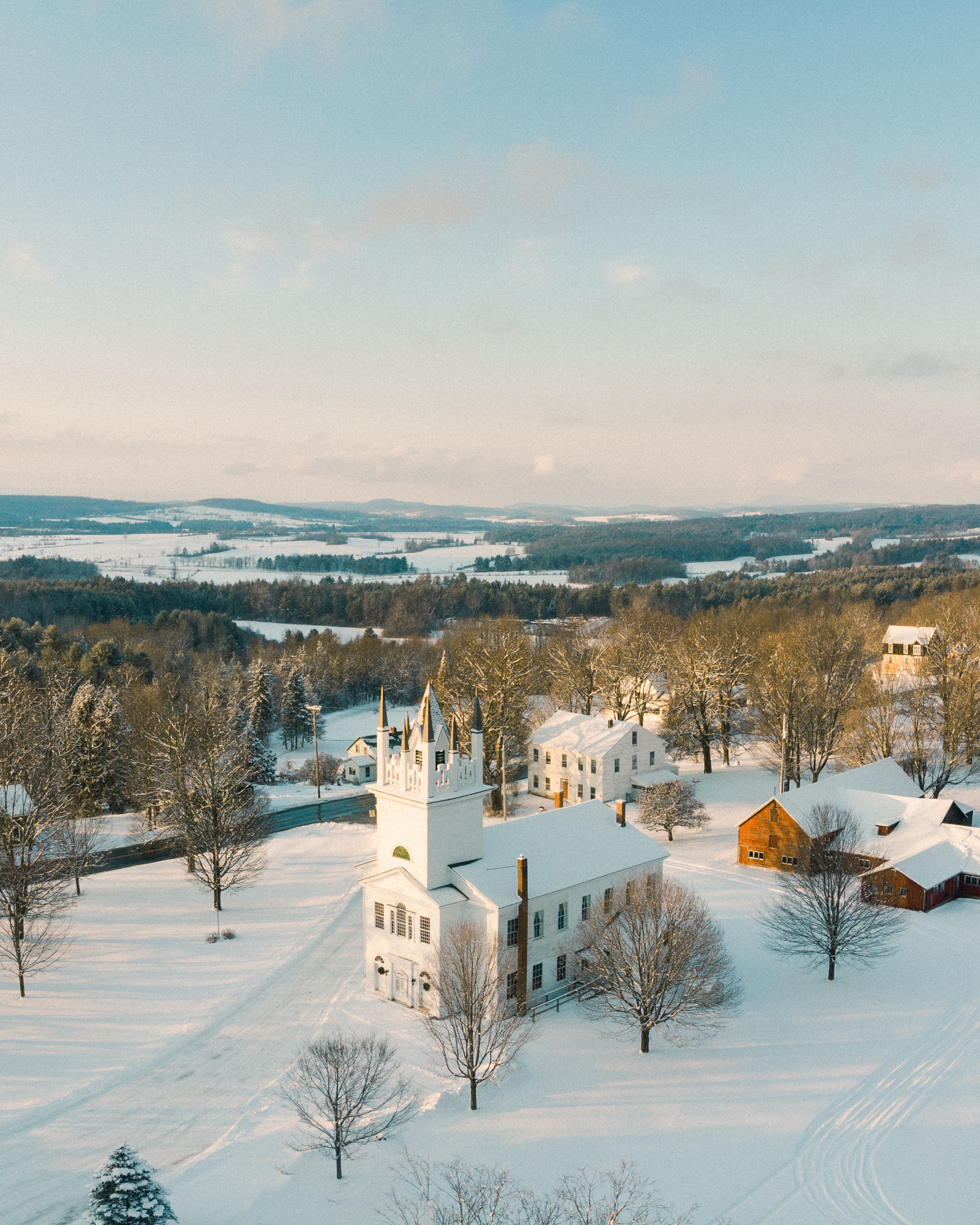
- The Sudbury Congregational Church in Sudbury village

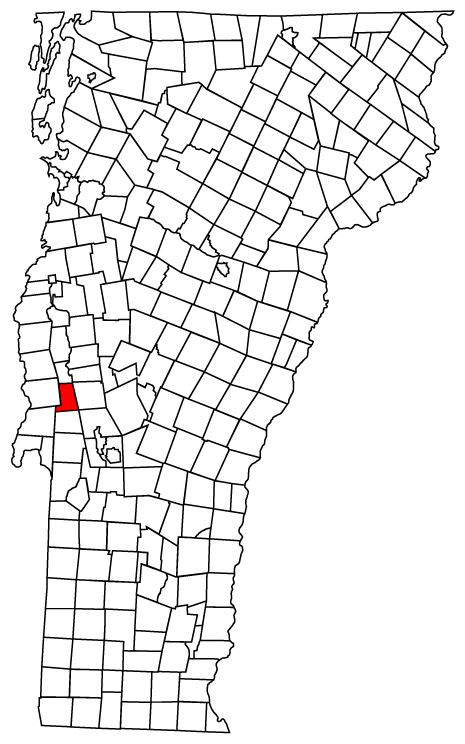
- Sudbury, Vermont
- Coordinates: 43°45′58″N 73°12′05″W
- Country: United States
- State: Vermont
- County: Rutland
- Communities: Hyde Manor; Sudbury

Area
  - Total: 22.2 sq mi (57.5 km^{2})
  - Land: 21.5 sq mi (55.7 km^{2})
  - Water: 0.69 sq mi (1.8 km^{2})
- Elevation: 810 ft (250 m)

Population (2020)
  - Total: 545
  - Density: 25.3/sq mi (9.78/km^{2})
- Time zone: UTC−5 (Eastern (EST))
  - Summer (DST): UTC−4 (EDT)
- ZIP Codes: 05733 (Sudbury); 05778 (Whiting)
- Area code: 802
- FIPS code: 50-71050
- GNIS feature ID: 1462222

Sudbury is a town in Rutland County, Vermont, United States. The population was 545 at the 2020 census.

== Geography ==
According to the United States Census Bureau, the town has a total area of 22.2 square miles (57 km^{2}), of which 21.5 square miles (56 km^{2}) is land and 0.7 square miles (1.8 km^{2}), or 3.15%, is water.

== Demographics ==
Historical population
Census	Pop.	Note	%±
1790	258		—
1800	521		101.9%
1810	754		44.7%
1820	809		7.3%
1830	812		0.4%
1840	796		−2.0%
1850	794		−0.3%
1860	696		−12.3%
1870	601		−13.6%
1880	562		−6.5%
1890	502		−10.7%
1900	474		−5.6%
1910	415		−12.4%
1920	417		0.5%
1930	361		−13.4%
1940	321		−11.1%
1950	263		−18.1%
1960	249		−5.3%
1970	253		1.6%
1980	380		50.2%
1990	516		35.8%
2000	583		13.0%
2010	560		−3.9%
2020	545		−2.7%
U.S. Decennial Census

As of the census of 2000, there were 583 people, 237 households, and 159 families residing in the town. The population density was 27.1 people per square mile (10.5/km^{2}). There were 373 housing units at an average density of 17.4 per square mile (6.7/km^{2}). The racial makeup of the town was 99.14% White, 0.34% African American, 0.17% Native American, 0.17% Pacific Islander, and 0.17% from two or more races. Hispanic or Latino of any race were 0.69% of the population.

There were 237 households, out of which 26.2% had children under the age of 18 living with them, 57.4% were married couples living together, 8.0% had a female householder with no husband present, and 32.9% were non-families. 24.9% of all households were made up of individuals, and 5.1% had someone living alone who was 65 years of age or older. The average household size was 2.46 and the average family size was 2.96.

In the town, the population was spread out, with 22.8% under the age of 18, 5.8% from 18 to 24, 27.8% from 25 to 44, 31.0% from 45 to 64, and 12.5% who were 65 years of age or older. The median age was 42 years. For every 100 females, there were 96.3 males. For every 100 females age 18 and over, there were 94.0 males.

The median income for a household in the town was $38,958, and the median income for a family was $47,083. Males had a median income of $33,333 versus $28,558 for females. The per capita income for the town was $18,994. About 3.2% of families and 7.7% of the population were below the poverty line, including 3.0% of those under age 18 and 12.1% of those age 65 or over.

== Notable people ==
- Edwin Atkins Merritt, former New York State Assemblyman and Collector of the Port of New York
