= Mallinger =

Mallinger is a surname. Notable people with the surname include:

- John Mallinger (born 1979), American golfer
- Mathilde Mallinger (1847–1920), Croatian opera singer
- Pat Mallinger (born 1964), American musician, composer, and bandleader

== See also ==
- Gallinger
- Mallinder
