= Gardner Cox House =

Historic house in New York, United States

- U.S. National Register of Historic Places
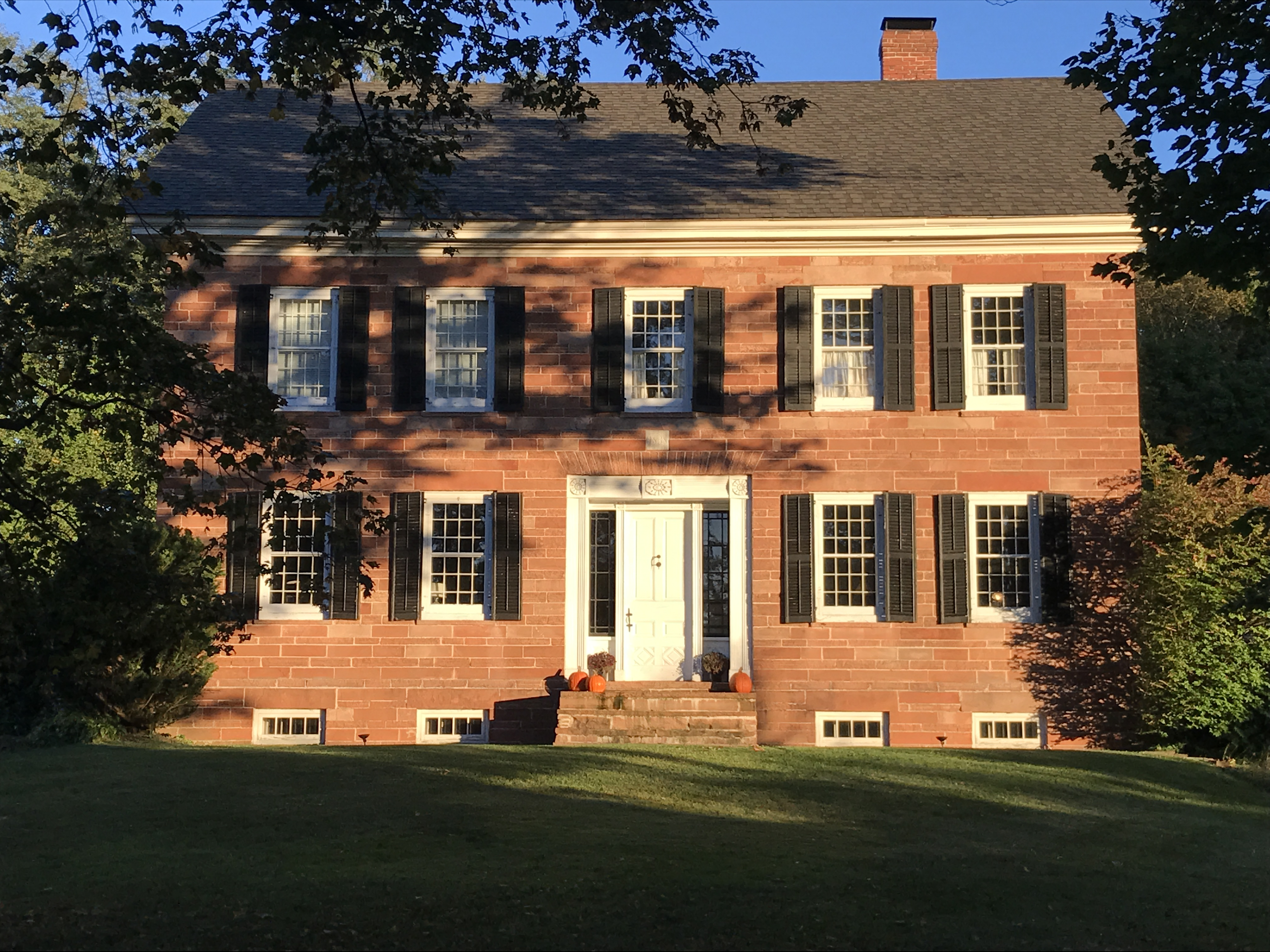
- Gardner Cox House from the front yard in October 2017,

- Location within New York Location within the United States
- Location: 5847 Main Street; Hannawa Falls, New York, U.S.
- Coordinates: 44°36′43″N 74°58′23″W
- Area: 1.3 acres (0.53 ha)
- Built: 1838
- Architectural style: Federal, Late Federal
- NRHP reference No.: 86000484
- Added to NRHP: March 20, 1986

Gardner Cox House is a historic home located at Hannawa Falls in St. Lawrence County, New York. It was built in 1838 and is a two-story, late Federal style stone structure, with a single-story wood-framed ell.

It was listed on the National Register of Historic Places in 1986.
