= Belevi =

- Neighbourhood
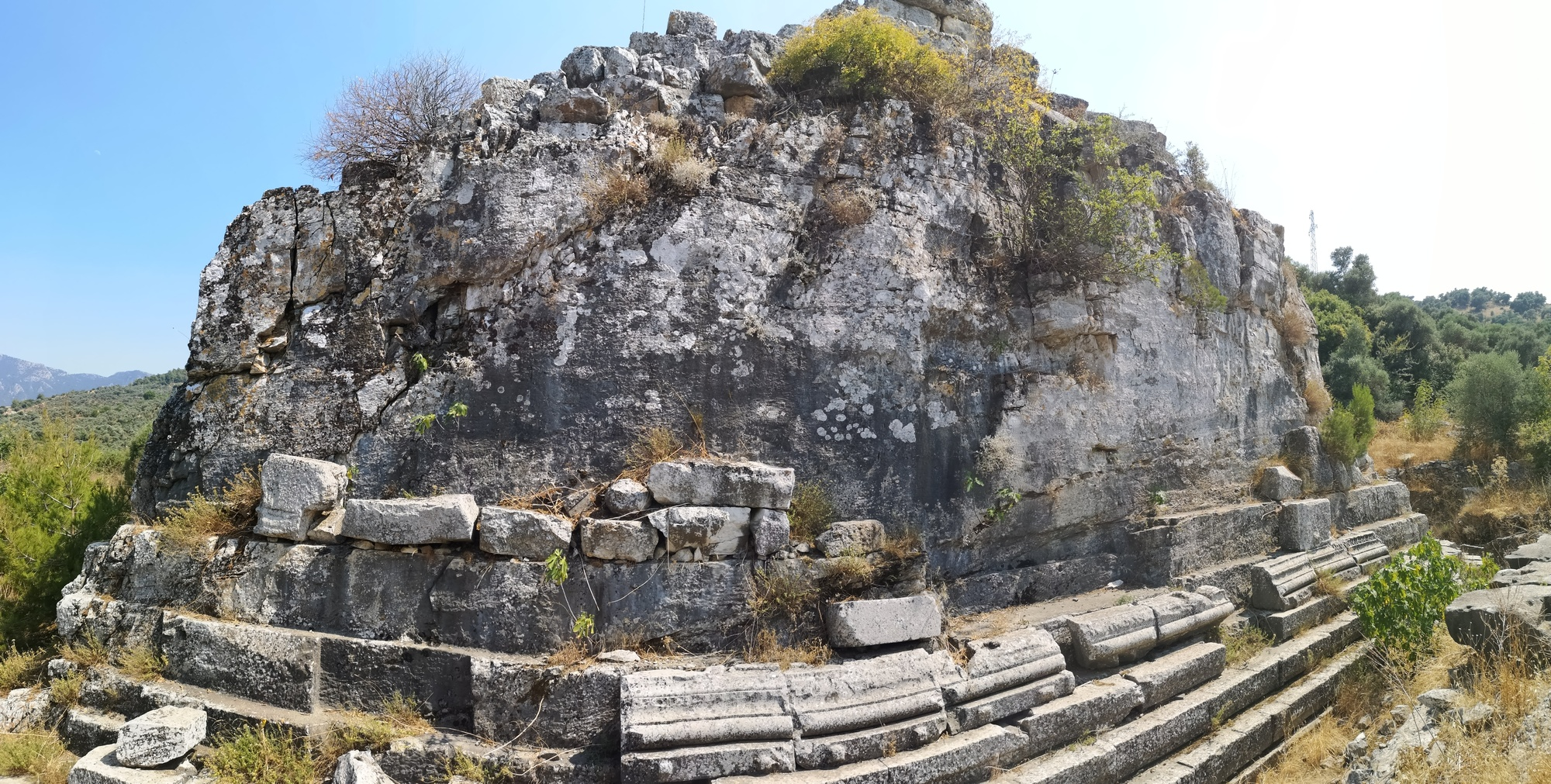
- Belevi Mausoleum

- Location within Turkey Location within İzmir
- Coordinates: 38°01′N 27°27′E
- Country: Turkey
- Province: İzmir
- District: Selçuk
- Elevation: 15 m (49 ft)
- Population (2022): 1,938
- Time zone: UTC+3 (TRT)
- Postal code: 35920
- Area code: 0232

Belevi is a neighbourhood in the municipality and district of Selçuk, İzmir Province, Turkey. Its population is 1,938 (2022). Before the 2013 reorganisation, it was a town (belde). It is situated between Turkish state highway D.550 and Turkish motorway O.31. Lake Belevi is to the east. The distance to Selçuk is 11 kilometres (6.8 mi) and to İzmir is 55 kilometres (34 mi). Belevi is the home of Belevi Mausoleum which was built by Lysimachus during the Hellenistic period of Anatolia. The mausoleum is situated 3 kilometres (1.9 mi) to the east of the town. Keçi kalesi or Kızılhisar is a castle situated in the Alamandağ (Galesion), a hill to the south of Belevi. In 1991 Belevi was declared a seat of township. Town economy depends on gardening, animal breeding and some light industries such as olive press. Citrus, figs and peaches are the main crops.
