= Edwin Atkins Merritt =

American politician

Edward Atkins Merritt
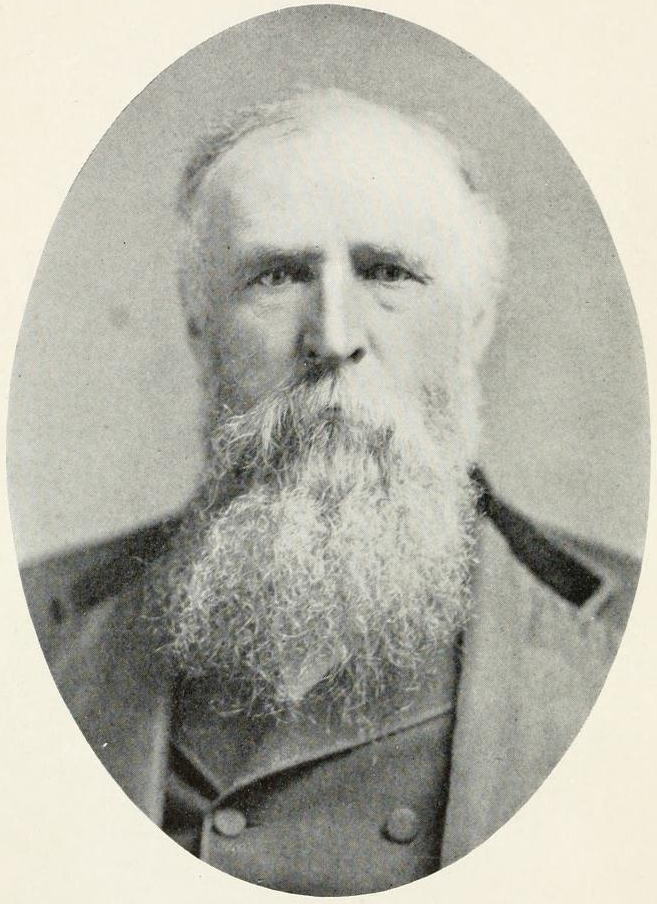

U.S. Consul General, London, England
- In office 1881–1885
- Preceded by: Adam Badeau
- Succeeded by: Thomas M. Waller

Collector of the Port of New York
- In office 1878–1881
- Preceded by: Chester A. Arthur
- Succeeded by: William H. Robertson

Surveyor of the Port of New York
- In office 1877–1878
- Preceded by: George H. Sharpe
- Succeeded by: Charles K. Graham

Naval Officer for the Port of New York
- In office 1869–1870
- Preceded by: John Adams Dix
- Succeeded by: Moses H. Grinnell

Member of the New York State Assembly from the St. Lawrence County, 2nd District
- In office 1860–1861
- Preceded by: William Briggs
- Succeeded by: James Redington

Clerk of the St. Lawrence County Board of Supervisors
- In office 1857–1861
- Preceded by: Martin Thatcher
- Succeeded by: Stillman Foote

Town Supervisor of Pierrepont, New York
- In office 1854–1857
- Preceded by: Peter F. Ryerson
- Succeeded by: Benjamin F. Hamilton

Personal details
- Born: February 26, 1828 Sudbury, Vermont, US
- Died: December 26, 1916 (aged 88) Potsdam, New York, US
- Resting place: Pierrepont Hill Cemetery, Pierrepont, New York
- Party: Republican
- Spouse: Eliza Rich (m. 1858)
- Relations: Edwin Albert Merritt (son)
- Occupation: Teacher; Surveyor; Engineer; Public official

Military service
- Branch/service: Union Army; New York Militia
- Years of service: 1861–1864 (Army); 1865-1869 (Militia)
- Rank: Captain (Army); Brigadier general (Militia)
- Battles/wars: American Civil War

Edwin Atkins Merritt (February 26, 1828 – December 26, 1916) was an American politician, civil service reformer and diplomat. He served as a Union Army officer in the American Civil War, and was a brigadier general in the New York Militia. In addition, he served in the New York State Assembly, and held the appointive post of Collector of the Port of New York.

== Life ==
Edwin A. Merritt was born in Sudbury, Vermont, on February 26, 1828, the son of Nodiah Merritt and Relief (Parker) Merritt. He was raised and educated in Essex County, New York, and attended St. Lawrence Academy to receive his teaching qualification. In addition to teaching, Merritt also worked as a surveyor and engineer.

From 1854 to 1857, Merritt was Town Supervisor of Pierrepont, New York. From 1857 to 1861 he was Clerk of the St. Lawrence County Board of Supervisors. He was a member of the New York State Assembly (St. Lawrence Co., 2nd D.) in 1860 and 1861.

During the American Civil War he served in the Union Army as quartermaster of the 60th New York Volunteer Infantry with the rank of captain, and took part in campaigns in Virginia, Maryland and Tennessee. He was later stationed in Washington, D.C., and assigned to supply reinforcements departing for the front lines. In January 1865 he was appointed Quartermaster General of the New York Militia with the rank of brigadier general, a position he held until 1869.

In April 1865, Merritt was New York's official representative at the second inauguration of Abraham Lincoln. He was a delegate to the 1867 state constitutional convention, and from 1869 to 1870 he was U.S. Naval Officer for the Port of New York, one of the three political appointees (collector, surveyor, and naval officer) who collected customs duties and fined importers who attempted to evade payment.

In 1871, he declined appointment as U.S. Minister to Brazil. In 1875 he ran on the Republican ticket for New York State Treasurer, but was defeated by Democrat Charles N. Ross. In 1877, Merritt was appointed Surveyor of the Port of New York, and in 1878 he was selected to serve as Collector, succeeding Chester A. Arthur. He served until 1881, when he was appointed U.S. Consul General in London, where he served until 1885.

Long interested in higher education, Merritt was a trustee of St. Lawrence University and Clarkson University, and was active in the creation of what is now the State University of New York at Potsdam. Merritt died in Potsdam, New York, on December 26, 1916. He was buried at Pierrepont Hill Cemetery in Pierrepont.

== Family ==
On May 5, 1858, Merritt married Eliza Rich of Pierrepont. Their son Edwin Albert Merritt was a Congressman from New York.

Government offices
Preceded by Chester A. Arthur	Collector of the Port of New York; 1878–1881	Succeeded by William H. Robertson
