= Menander (disambiguation) =

Menander is a Latinized form of the Greek Μένανδρος, Menandros, "staunch man" or "abiding man." It may refer to:

Persons

- Menander, Greek dramatist
- Menander (general), general of Alexander the Great
- Menander I Soter, also known as Milinda, Indo-Greek king
  - Milinda Panha, Buddhist work from ancient India, presented as a dialogue between Menander and the Indian monk Nagasena
- Menander II Dikaios, Indo-Greek king
- Menander of Laodicea, Greek rhetorician
- Menander Protector, Byzantine historian and ethnographer
- Menander of Ephesus, (c. early 2nd century BCE), wrote a history of Tyre, Lebanon
- Menander (gnostic), a student of Simon Magus and his successor as leader of Simonianism

Other

- The House of Menander, in Pompeii, named for its fresco of a poet
- Menander (butterfly), a genus of metalmark butterflies in the tribe Nymphidiini
- Milind, Indian form of the Greek name
