= Society for Contemporary Craft =

Art society in Pennsylvania

Contemporary Craft
- Society for Contemporary Craft
- Founded: 1971
- Type: Art museum, Non-profit
- Purpose: Craft, Contemporary art, Social justice
- Location: 5645 Butler Street, Lawrenceville, Pittsburgh, Pennsylvania
- Website: contemporarycraft.org

Contemporary Craft (CC), which was previously known as the Society for Contemporary Craft, presents contemporary art in craft media such as ceramics, metals, fiber, glass, wood, and mixed media by international, national, and regional artists. In 2020, CC relocated from The Strip District to its permanent location on Butler Street in the Lawrenceville neighborhood in Pittsburgh, Pennsylvania, United States. The organization offers exhibitions focusing on multi-cultural diversity and social justice., artist-led, hands-on workshops, and a store featuring handcrafted art objects by artists from across the United States. CC is free admission and open to the public.

Between three and four exhibits are displayed annually in CC's main gallery and bring in approximately 35,000 visitors. Another 100,000 visit the Satellite Gallery at One Mellon Center, that was opened in 1990. This second gallery is located in the Pittsburgh Steel Plaza T-station and allows those working downtown the opportunity to experience art.

CC is nonprofit, aiming to bring arts to the community. It provides as much free access and programs as possible. In addition to the current exhibits and various studio workshops, CC reaches out into the community and focuses on at-risk youth, seniors in assisted living, and those living in homeless shelters.

== History ==
CC was founded in 1971 by Elizabeth Rockwell Raphael in the belief that contemporary artists had new things to say with traditional materials, and that they needed wider opportunities to exhibit and sell their work. Since then, CC has organized more than 230 exhibitions and has established a satellite gallery and a permanent collection. CC also offers a range of studio classes, community outreach programs, and a retail store.

Elizabeth “Betty” Rockwell Raphael, who has been called one of the most groundbreaking women in the arts was the first to transform the Pittsburgh arts scene. Before its foundation in 1971, Raphael opened a small art gallery in 1941 making the first modern art gallery Pittsburgh had ever seen. She introduced a new vision of art to the city and created what is now one of the only organizations in the country that focuses solely on craft media.

In 2010, CC was named a "Champion in Action" in the community arts category by Citizens Bank and WPXI-TV, and received a $25,000 grant for “offering cutting-edge exhibitions focused on multicultural diversity and non-mainstream art, as well as a range of classes and community outreach programs,” said Ralph J, Papa, Chairman of Citizens Bank of Pennsylvania.

In 2018, CC received the Award of Distinction from American Craft Council. This award recognizes an organization, institution, corporation, or individual who has made significant contributions to the field of craft with a minimum of 25 years of service. CC was the first organization to receive this award in Pittsburgh, PA.

== General references ==
- https://nextpittsburgh.com/city-design/contemporary-craft-opens-in-a-renovated-building-in-upper-lawrenceville-more-than-ever-this-is-needed/
