= Millender =

Millender is a surname. Notable people with the surname include:

- Juanita Millender-McDonald (1938–2007), American politician
- Robert L. Millender - American lawyer, law partner of George W. Crockett, Jr.
- Curtis Millender (born 1987), American mixed martial artist

== See also ==
- Millender Center Apartments in Detroit, Michigan, United States
