= Osma Gallinger Tod =

American artist

- Osma Gallinger Tod, from a 1949 newspaper
- Born: Lucy Osma Palmer; January 18, 1895; Newark, New Jersey, U.S.
- Died: January 10, 1983 (aged 87); Centerville, Massachusetts, U.S.
- Other names: Osma P. Crouch, Osma Gallinger, Osma Tod
- Occupations: Artist, art educator, writer
- Children: Josephine Del Deo

Lucy Osma Palmer Gallinger Tod (January 18, 1895 – January 10, 1983) was an American artist, writer, and arts educator, specializing in weaving, basketry, and other craft techniques.

== Early life ==
Lucy Osma Palmer was born in Newark, New Jersey, the daughter of William E. Palmer and Alice Cornelia Hoyt Palmer. Her father was a clergyman. She studied piano and graduated from Wellesley College.

== Career ==
During World War II, Gallinger and her second husband ran a weaving studio and loom factory in Guernsey, Pennsylvania, near Gettysburg. One of their products was a loom for bed use, intended to be used by convalescent soldiers as occupational therapy. They also launched a home-weaving program in Michigan. She was head of the National Conference of American Handweavers for twenty years. In the 1960s and 1970s she taught at her weaving studio in Coral Gables, Florida. The Coral Gables Library and the Weavers Guild of South Florida held a retrospective show of Tod's work in 1981.

Books by Tod included Basket Pioneering (1933, with Daniel Carter Beard), Earth Basketry (1933), Embroidery in Wools (1933), The Game of Weaving (1938, with Constance Darrow and Dorothy McCloud), Joys of Handweaving (1944), Rug Weaving for Everyone (1952), Designing and Making Handwoven Rugs (1957), Bobbin Lace: Step-by-Step (1969), Household Baskets (1970), Basketry: A Popular Handbook, Wool Stitchery, Manual of Helpful Hints for Handweavers (1974), and Weaving with Reeds and Fibers (1975, with Oscar H. Benson). She also edited a magazine about weaving, Shuttle Service, wrote hundreds of articles for magazines, and ran a correspondence course on weaving. "It's like math," she explained of weaving's comforts. "Right is right and wrong is wrong. If you make a mistake, take it out, don't cover it up."

Artist Dorothy Gill Barnes described Osma Gallinger Tod as a helpful influence.

== Personal life ==
Osma Palmer married three times; her first husband was fellow artist Frank Byron Couch. They married in 1924, and had a daughter, Josephine (later writer and preservationist Josephine Del Deo, 1925–2016); he died in 1928. Her second husband was loombuilder Milo Oliver Gallinger; he died in 1956. Her third husband was engineer James Tod; they married in 1960, and he died in 1969. "Each time I was widowed it was my art that saved me", she recalled in 1981. "When you are passionately in love and that love is lost, you have to do something to close the gap." Osma Gallinger Tod died in 1983, in Centerville, Massachusetts, aged 87 years. Her papers are held in the Archives of American Art.
