= Millinder =

Millinder is a surname. Notable people with the surname include:

- Jim Millinder (born 1958), American soccer player and coach
- Lucky Millinder (1910–1966), American jazz musician
