= Arthur Smith =

Arthur Smith may refer to:

== Politicians ==
- Arthur Smith (burgess 1685) on List of members of the Virginia House of Burgesses
- Arthur Smith (burgess 1703) on List of members of the Virginia House of Burgesses
- Arthur Smith (assemblyman) in 29th New York State Legislature
- Arthur Smith (congressman) (1785–1853), U.S. representative from Virginia
- Arthur R. Smith (1805–1865), Virginia State Senate, Virginia Constitutional Convention of 1850, Secession Convention of 1861
- Arthur Smith-Barry, 1st Baron Barrymore (1843–1925), Anglo-Irish Conservative politician
- Arthur LeRoy Smith (1886–1951), Canadian politician, Member of Parliament for Calgary West
- Arthur Smith (Australian politician) (1902–1981), member of the Victorian Legislative Council, 1958–1961
- Arthur Leslie "Bud" Smith (1919–2002), Canadian politician
- Arthur Ryan Smith (1919–2008), Canadian politician, Member of Parliament for Calgary South

== Sports ==
=== American football ===
- Arthur F. Smith, American college football coach
- Arthur Smith (American football, early 1900s), American football player and coach in the early 1900s
- Arthur Smith (American football, born 1982), American football player and coach

=== Association football ===
- Arthur Smith (footballer, born 1879) (1879–1963), Australian rules footballer for South Melbourne
- Arthur Smith (footballer, born 1887) (1887–?), English association footballer
- Arthur Smith (Welsh footballer) (fl. 1927-1928) , Welsh footballer
- Arthur Smith (footballer, born 1908) (1908–1987), Australian rules footballer for Footscray and North Melbourne
- Jack Smith (footballer, born 1911) (Arthur John Smith, 1911–1975), Welsh footballer and football manager
- Arthur Smith (footballer, born 1915) (1915–2021), English association footballer

=== Cricket ===
- Arthur Smith (cricketer, born 1851) (1851–1923), English cricketer for Sussex
- Arthur Smith (cricketer, born 1853) (1853–1936), English cricketer for Middlesex
- Arthur Smith (cricketer, born 1857) (1857–1937), English cricketer for Lancashire and Nottinghamshire
- Arthur Smith (cricketer, born 1872) (1872–1952), English cricketer for Leicestershire

=== Rugby ===
- Arthur Smith (rugby) (c. 1880–1946), English rugby union and rugby league footballer of the 1900s and 1910s
- Arthur Smith (rugby league), English rugby league footballer of the 1920s for Warrington
- Arthur Smith (rugby union) (1933–1975), Scottish rugby union footballer

=== Other sports ===
- Arthur Smith (amateur jockey) in National Hunt Chase Challenge Cup
- Arthur Smith (sport shooter) (1887–1958), represented South Africa at the 1912 Summer Olympics
- Arthur Smith (golfer) in 1905 U.S. Open
- Arthur Smith (tennis) in 1930 Wimbledon Championships – Men's Singles
- Arthur Smith (fencer) (1915–?), British Olympic fencer

== Musicians ==
- A. E. Smith (violin maker) (Arthur Edward Smith, 1880–1978), Australian violin maker
- Fiddlin' Arthur Smith (1898–1971), old-time fiddler and songwriter
- Arthur "Guitar Boogie" Smith (1921–2014), American guitar player and composer

== Writers ==
- Arthur D. Howden Smith (1887–1945), American historian and novelist
- A. J. M. Smith (Arthur James Marshall Smith, 1902–1980), Canadian poet
- Arthur Smith (American poet) (1948–2018), American poet
- Arthur Smith (comedian) (born 1954), British comedian and writer

== Others ==
- Arthur Britton Smith (1920–2023), Canadian philanthropist and businessman
- Arthur Smith (captain) (1680–1755), Founder of Smithfield, Virginia
- Arthur Donaldson Smith (1866–1939), American explorer of Africa
- Arthur Hall Smith (1929–2013), American painter
- Arthur Henderson Smith (1845–1932), American missionary in China, author of books on Chinese culture
- Arthur H. Smith (architect) (1869–?), English-American architect
- Arthur Mumford Smith (1903–1968), judge of the U.S. Court of Customs and Patent Appeals
- Arthur O. Smith, industrial magnate who founded the A.O. Smith Corporation
- Arthur Smith (curator) (1860–1941), British museum curator and Director of the British School at Rome
- Arthur Smith (illustrator) (1916–1991), British entomological illustrator
- Arthur Smith (British Army officer) (1890–1977), commanding officer of British Forces in India and Pakistan, 1947–1948
- Arthur Smith (historian) (1850–1924), British historian at the University of Oxford
- Neddy Smith (Arthur Stanley Smith, 1944–2021), Australian criminal
- Arthur Smith (priest) (1909–2001), Archdeacon of Lincoln
- Arthur Smith (public servant) (1893–1971), Australian public servant
- Arthur Smith (producer) (born 1960), Canadian-born American television producer
- Arthur K. Smith (born 1937), American academic
- Arthur Francis Smith (1849–1915), British organist and composer

== See also ==
- Art Smith (disambiguation)
- Arthur Smyth (1707–1771), Archbishop of Dublin and Privy Counsellor of Ireland
- Arthur Bowes Smyth (1750–1790), naval officer and surgeon
