= List of National Natural Landmarks in Minnesota =

There are eight National Natural Landmarks in the U.S. state of Minnesota.

Minnesota National Natural Landmarks (clickable map)

Name	Image	Date	Location	County	Ownership	Description
Ancient River Warren Channel		1966	45°35′6″N 96°49′48″W	Big Stone	mixed- state, private	A channel cut by the Ancient River Warren during the Ice Age. Extends into South Dakota.
Cedar Creek Natural History Area		1975	45°24′7.29″N 93°11′57.85″W	Anoka, Isanti	mixed- state, private	A relatively undisturbed area where tall grass prairie, eastern deciduous forest and boreal coniferous forest biomes meet.
Itasca Natural Area	Itasca Natural Area	1975	47°11′40.21″N 95°9′55.22″W	Clearwater	state (Itasca State Park)	Contains some of the finest remaining stands of virgin red pine, spruce- balsam fir, and maple-basswood-aspen forest.
Keeley Creek Natural Area		1965	47°47′23.5″N 91°42′22.52″W	Lake	federal (Superior National Forest)	A large tract of undisturbed mixed pine and black spruce forest.
Lac la Croix Research Natural Area		1980	48°20′N 92°7′W	St. Louis	federal (Superior National Forest)	Old-growth virgin pine forests.
Lake Agassiz Peatlands Natural Area		1965	48.037°N 93.475°W	Koochiching	state	An example of the extensive peatlands occupying the bed of ancient glacial Lake Agassiz.
Pine Point Research Natural Area		1975	47°7′52.83″N 94°33′19.09″W	Cass	federal (Chippewa National Forest)	Contains undisturbed stands of red and mixed pine.
Upper Red Lake Peatland		1975	48°11′34″N 94°30′43″W	Beltrami	mixed- federal, state, private, native	One of the largest peatlands remaining in the coterminous United States.

== See also ==
- List of National Historic Landmarks in Minnesota
