= Arthur H. Smith (architect) =

American architect

- Born: 1869; London
- Occupation: Architect

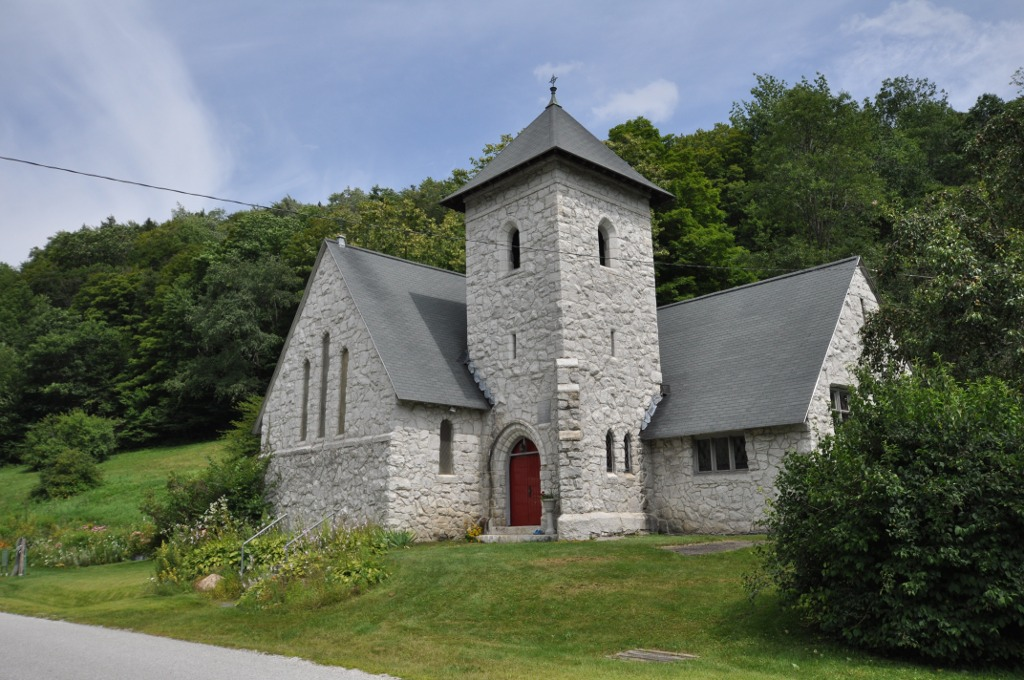
Church of Our Saviour, Killington, 1894.

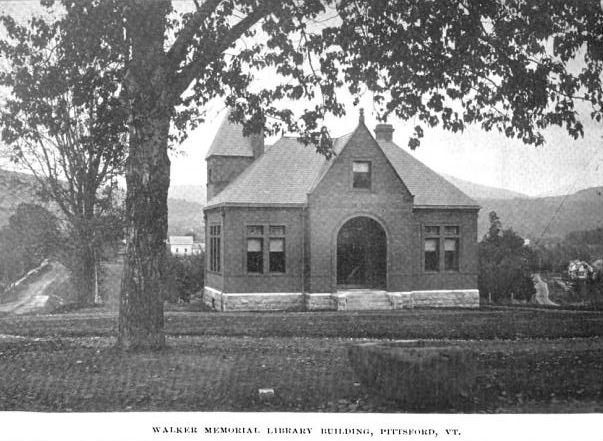
Maclure Library, Pittsford, 1895.

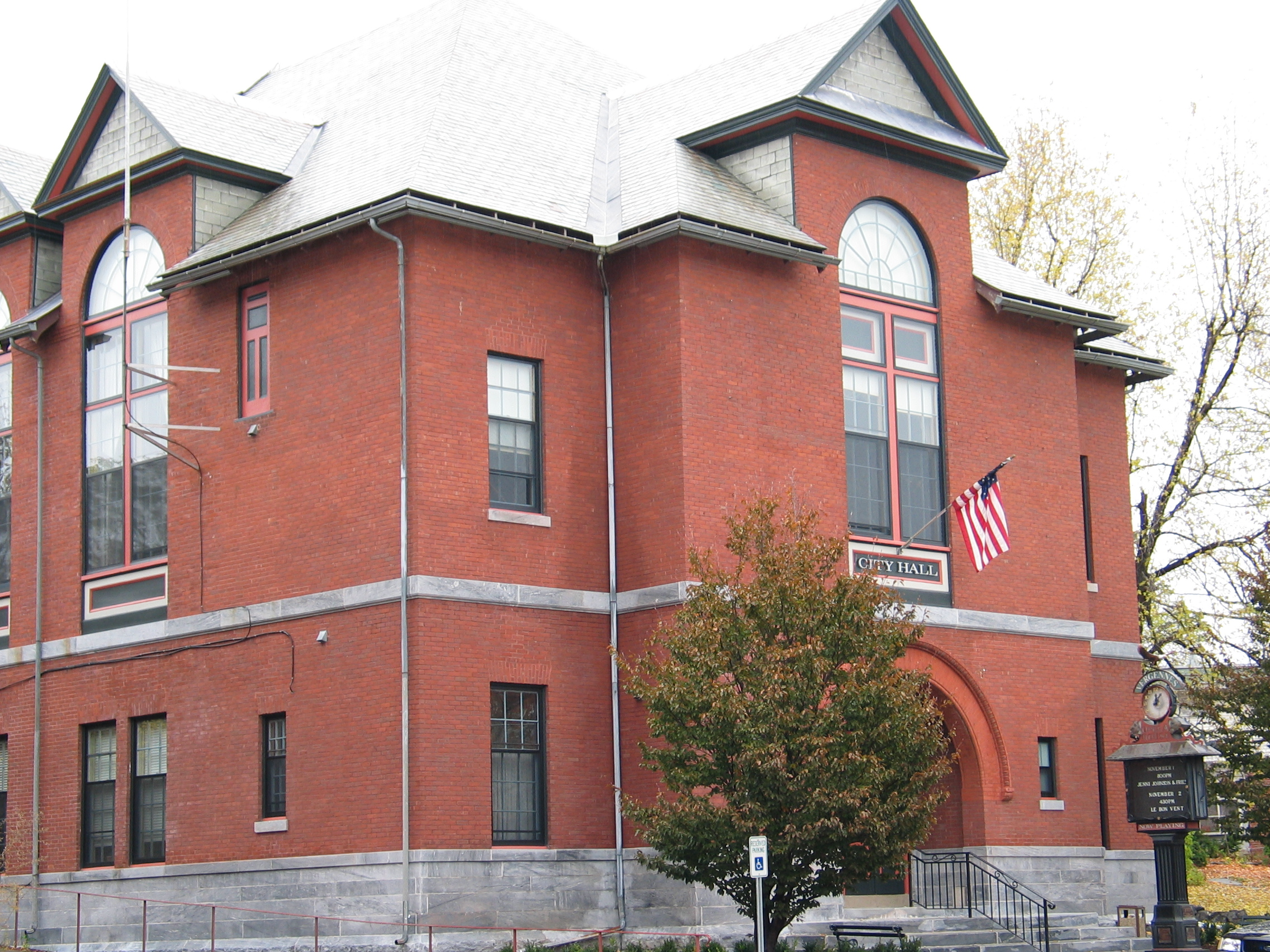
Vergennes City Hall, Vergennes, 1897.

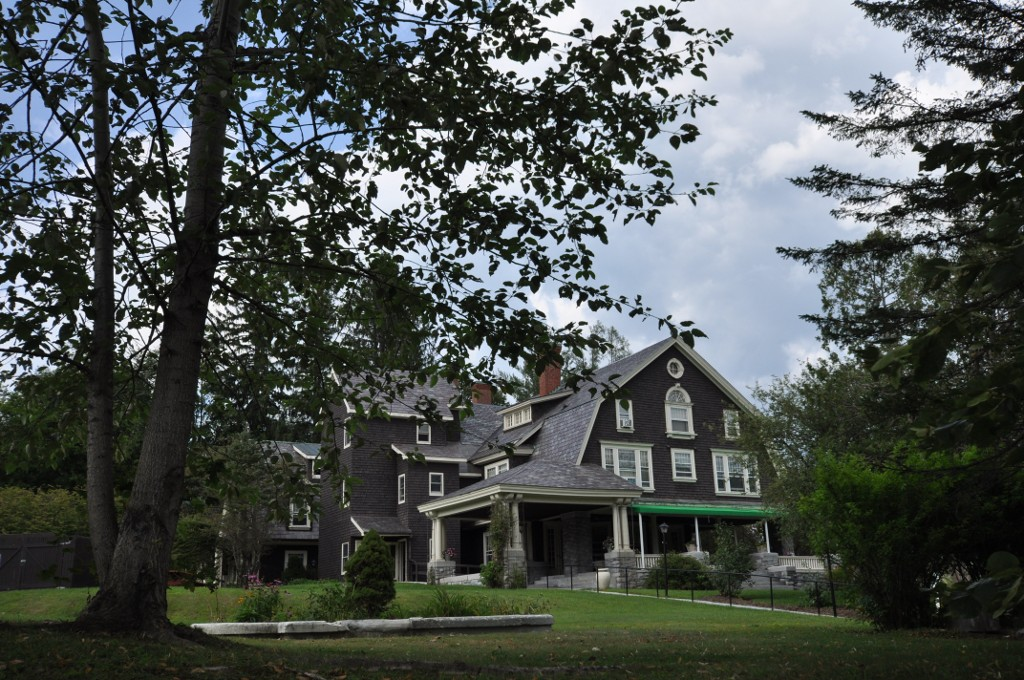
Linden Terrace, Rutland, 1912.

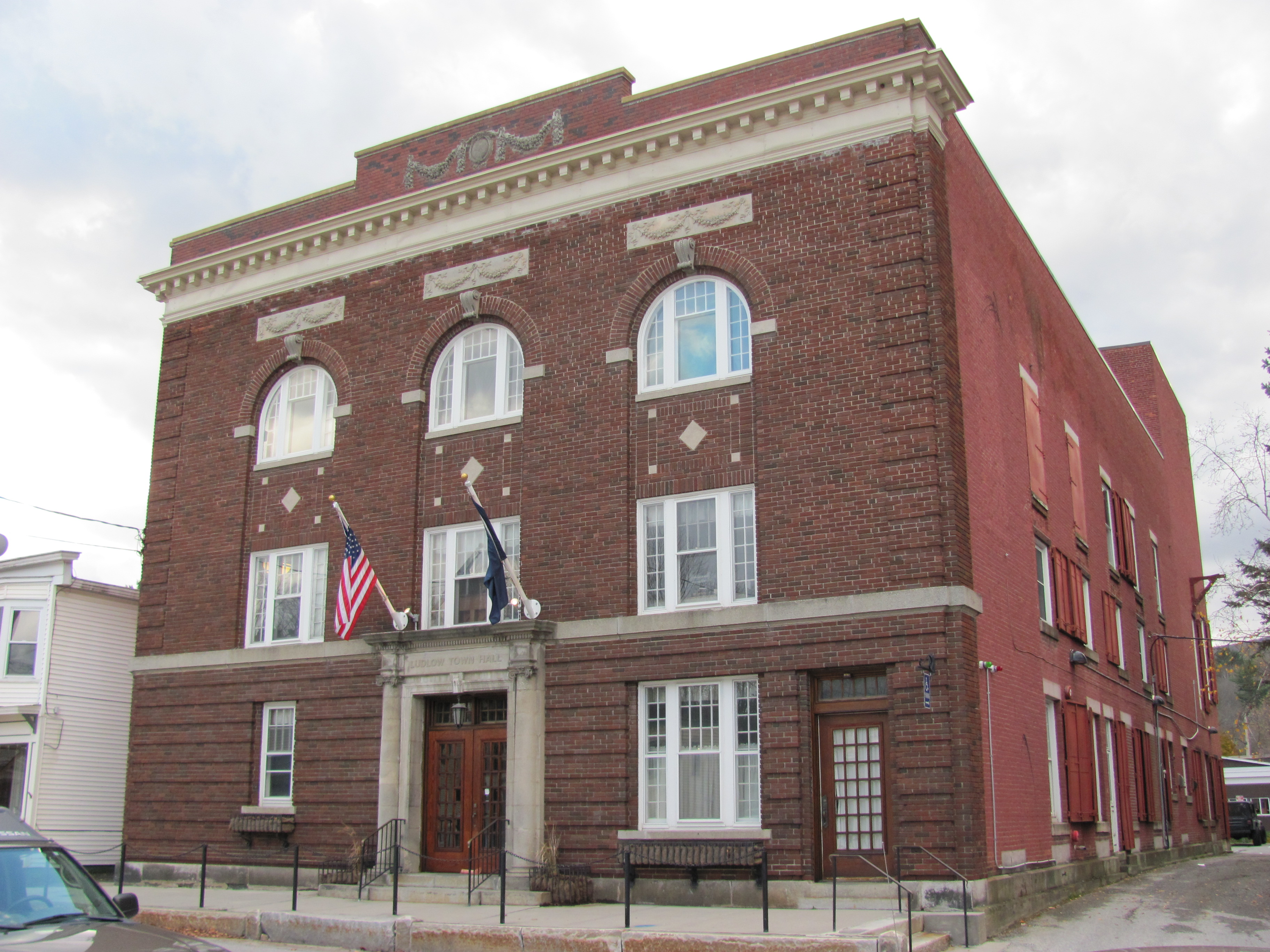
Ludlow Town Hall, Ludlow, 1922.

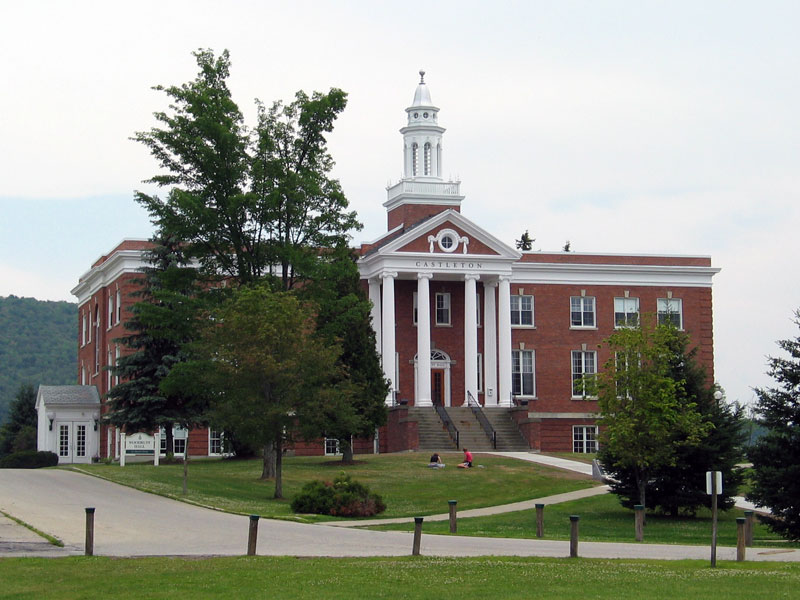
Woodruff Hall, Castleton University, 1924.

Arthur H. Smith (born 1869) was an English-American architect who practiced in the small city of Rutland, Vermont.

== Life and career ==
Smith was born in 1869 in London, and attended the University of Edinburgh. He immigrated to the United States in 1889, settling in Rutland in about 1892. He joined the office of Chappell & Burke, a civil engineering firm who wanted to expand to include architectural services, which Smith would provide. In 1895 John W. Burke left the firm, and Thomas F. Chappell and Smith formed a new partnership, Chappell & Smith. This firm was dissolved in about 1897.

Smith would go on to be the region's most prominent architect, practicing well into the 20th century.

== Legacy ==
Two buildings designed by Smith have been individually placed on the National Register of Historic Places, and several more of his designs contribute to listed historic districts. Linden Terrace, designed by him in 1912, is one of his greatest architectural accomplishments.

== Architectural works ==
=== For Chappell & Burke, before 1895 ===
- 1894 - Abraham Lincoln School, 110 Lincoln Ave, Rutland, Vermont
- 1894 - Episcopal Church of Our Saviour, 316 Mission Farm Rd, Killington, Vermont

=== Chappell & Smith, 1895-1897 ===
- 1895 - Maclure Library, 840 Arch St, Pittsford, Vermont
- 1896 - Arthur H. Smith House, 72 Crescent St, Rutland, Vermont
  - The architect's own residence.
- 1896 - James Walker House, 74 Crescent St, Rutland, Vermont
- 1897 - Vergennes City Hall, 120 Main St, Vergennes, Vermont

=== Arthur H. Smith, from 1897 ===
- 1897 - Barlow Street School, 39 Barlow St, St. Albans, Vermont
- 1897 - Messenger Street School, 75 Messenger St, St. Albans, Vermont
- 1897 - St. Albans City Hall, 100 N Main St, St. Albans, Vermont
- 1898 - Franklin County Jail, 30 Lincoln Ave, St. Albans, Vermont
- 1898 - St. Albans Town Hall, 579 Lake Rd, St. Albans, Vermont
- 1901 - Rutland City Hall, 52 Washington St, Rutland, Vermont
- 1906 - Gryphon Building, 122 West St, Rutland, Vermont
- 1906 - Tuttle-Caverly Block, 9-13 Center St, Rutland, Vermont
- 1910 - Grand Theatre, 106 West St, Rutland, Vermont
- 1912 - Herman W. Vaughan House (Linden Terrace), 191 Grove St, Rutland, Vermont
- 1913 - E. Fred Massey House, 65 N Main St, Rutland, Vermont
- 1914 - New Gryphon Building, 56 Merchants Row, Rutland, Vermont
  - Home to Smith's offices.
- 1922 - Ludlow Town Hall, 39 Depot St, Ludlow, Vermont
- 1924 - Woodruff Hall, Castleton University, Castleton, Vermont
- 1927 - Leavenworth Hall, Castleton University, Castleton, Vermont
  - Burned in 1971.
