= Lake Agassiz Peatlands Natural Area =

Protected area in Minnesota, US

- Location within Minnesota
- Location: Koochiching County, Minnesota
- Coordinates: 48°02′13″N 93°28′30″W
- Area: 25,411 acres (10,283 ha)
- Designated: 1965

Lake Agassiz Peatlands Natural Area is a 25,411-acre (10,283 ha) National Natural Landmark located in Koochiching County, Minnesota consisting of peatlands. The Myrtle Lake Peatland State Natural Area is contained within the Lake Agassiz Peatlands and covers 22,950 acres (9,290 ha).

== Description ==
Peatlands cover more than 10% of Minnesota and compared to other Minnesota ecosystems, have not been cleared or fragmented by development. Minnesota has over 6 million acres of peatlands, more than any other U.S. state except Alaska. Minnesota peatlands are accessible to researchers, and do not have permafrost, allowing for study of groundwater hydrology. They are also unusually close to the prairie-forest border compared to other North American peatlands. Extensive glacial lake plains also lie within the Laurentian Mixed Forest Province of Minnesota. Raised bogs, water track fens including pattern water tracks or fens and featureless water tracks, and spring fens all exist in Lake Agassiz Peatlands Natural Area.

== History ==
=== Formation ===
Minnesota's peatlands began to form about 5-6,000 years ago when the climate cooled and precipitation increased. They formed in part of the footprint from Lake Agassiz, a lake fed by meltwater from the retreating Laurentide Ice sheet at the end of the last ice age. Peat formation requires low-oxygen conditions that prevent normal decomposition of plant debris, and occurs in areas of poor drainage where there is more precipitation than evaporation. The water table also is high, at or near the surface, and saturates dead plant material, allowing organic matter to accumulate and form peat.

Some Minnesota peatlands are acidic, deep, and over 4,000 years old and support black spruce bogs and poor swam forests.

=== National Natural Landmark designation ===
Designated in November 1965 under the Historic Sites Act, its ownership and oversight are provided by the National Park Service of the United States. This designation from the United States Secretary of the Interior, gives it recognition as an outstanding example of the nation's natural history. The designation describes it as

An example of the extensive peatlands occupying the bed of ancient glacial Lake Agassiz, illustrating the process of peat accumulation over about 11,000 years. The area contains Myrtle Lake Bog, which developed contrary to the usual successional process of lake filling, and is an excellent example of both raised and string bogs.

== Natural diversity ==
=== Flora ===
Plants found in Minnesota peatlands include leather leaf, Labrador tea, sundews, bladderworts, black spruce, swamp laurel, bog rosemary, and sedges, cotton grasses, bog birch, willows, and brown and sphagnum moss species.

Endangered, threatened, or plants of concern can be found in Minnesota peatlands such as linear-leaved sundew, English sundew, coastal sedge, twig rush, bog rush, sooty colored beak-rush, and montane yellow-eyed grass.

=== Fauna ===
Otherwise uncommon animals in Minnesota peatlands include northern bog lemming, short-eared owl, yellow rail, and Wilson's phalarope. Some shrews and voles also inhabit peatlands, as well as red squirrels and snowshoe hares. With the construction of ditches, beaver, muskrat, otter, and mink are now more common.

Prior to the loss of migration routes in the early 1900s, woodland caribou were present in Minnesota peatlands.

Great grey owls live permanently in forested peatlands. Migratory birds come to peatlands in spring and summer months.
