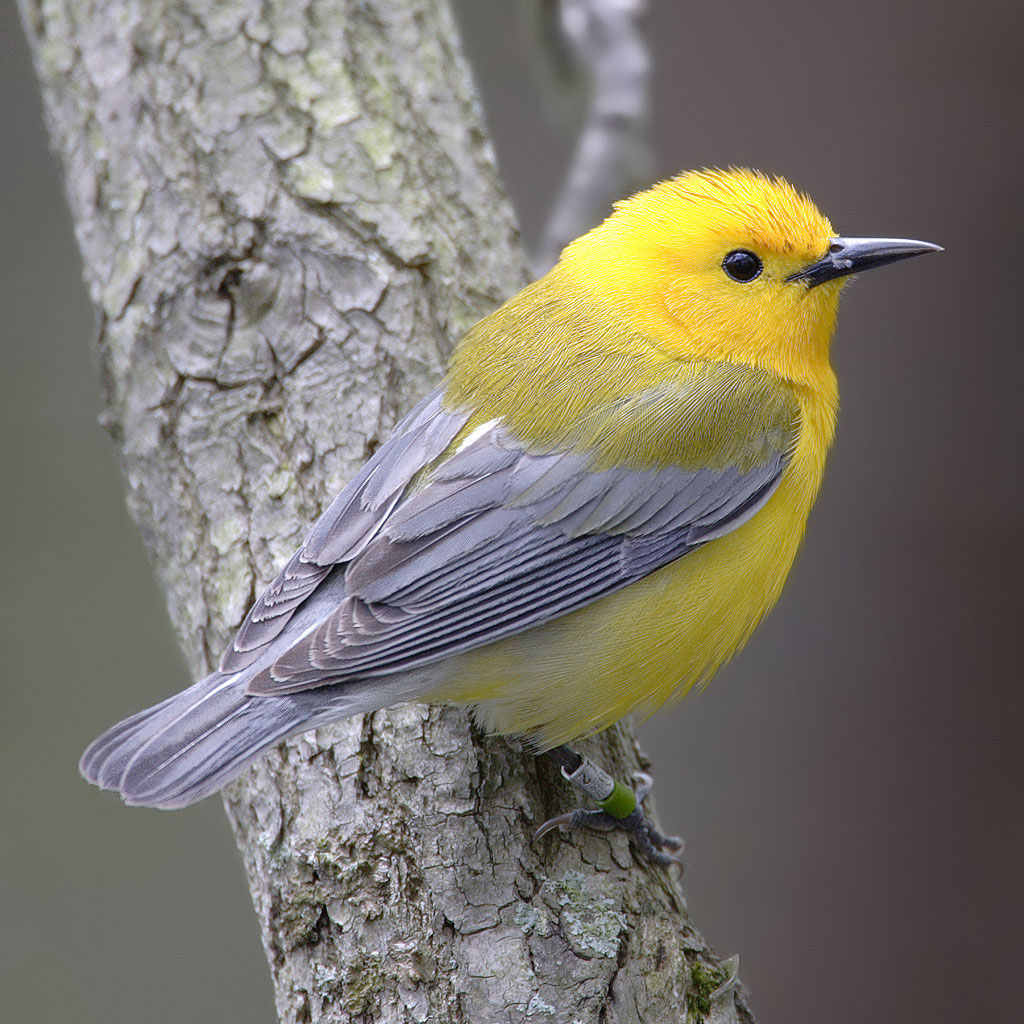
- Female

Conservation status
- Least Concern (IUCN 3.1)

Scientific classification
- Kingdom: Animalia
- Phylum: Chordata
- Class: Aves
- Order: Passeriformes
- Family: Parulidae
- Genus: Protonotaria; Baird, 1858
- Species: P. citrea

Binomial name
- Protonotaria citrea (Boddaert, 1783)
- Range of P. citrea Breeding range Wintering range

= Prothonotary warbler =

Species of bird

The prothonotary warbler (Protonotaria citrea) is a small songbird of the New World warbler family. It is named for its plumage, which resembles the yellow robes once worn by papal clerks (named prothonotaries) in the Roman Catholic Church.

The prothonotary warbler is the only member of the genus Protonotaria and the only eastern warbler that nests in natural or artificial cavities.

These warblers often move with quick, jerky, movements and will even crawl upside down on sticks or trees. During the spring they are often seen in wetlands gathering nesting material, or food, for their mate.

== Taxonomy ==
The prothonotary warbler was described by the French polymath Georges-Louis Leclerc, Comte de Buffon in 1779 in his Histoire Naturelle des Oiseaux from a specimen collected in Louisiana. Buffon coined the French name Le figuier protonotaire. The bird was also illustrated in a hand-coloured plate engraved by François-Nicolas Martinet in the Planches Enluminées D'Histoire Naturelle, which was produced under the supervision of Edme-Louis Daubenton to accompany Buffon's text. Neither the plate caption nor Buffon's description included a scientific name but in 1783 the Dutch naturalist Pieter Boddaert coined the binomial name Motacilla citrea in his catalogue of the Planches Enluminées. The prothonotary warbler is now the only species placed in the genus Protonotaria that was introduced in 1858 by the American naturalist Spencer Baird. The species is monotypic; no subspecies are recognised.

The genus name is from Late Latin protonotarius, meaning "prothonotary", a notary attached to the Byzantine court who wore golden-yellow robes. The specific citrea is from Latin citreus meaning the colour "citrine". It was once known as the golden swamp warbler.

A molecular phylogenetic study of the family Parulidae published in 2010 found that the prothonotary warbler was a sister species to Swainson's warbler (Limnothlypis swainsonii).

== Description ==
The prothonotary warbler is 13 cm (5.1 in) long, weighs a mean 14.3 g (0.50 oz), and has a wingspan of 22 cm (8.75 in). It has an olive-coloured back with blue-grey wings and tail, yellow underparts, a relatively long pointed bill, and black legs. The adult male has a bright orange-yellow head. Females and immature birds are duller and have a yellow head. In flight from below, the short, wide tail has a distinctive two-toned pattern, white at the base and dark at the tip.

== Distribution and habitat ==
The prothonotary warbler mostly breeds in hardwood swamps in extreme southeastern Ontario and the eastern United States. However, it may nest near other bodies of water such as creeks, streams, ponds, and swimming pools.

The habitat of the warblers during migration is not well known. However, they are particularly prominent in Belize during spring migration.

The warblers winter in the West Indies, Central America and northern South America, primarily in mangrove swamps.

It is a rare vagrant to parts of the western United States, most notably California.

== Behavior and ecology ==
The prothonotary warbler is the only eastern warbler that nests in natural or artificial cavities, sometimes using old downy woodpecker holes. The male often builds several incomplete, unused nests in his territory; the female builds the real nest and lays 3–7 eggs.

The preferred foraging habitat is dense, woody streams, where the prothonotary warbler forages actively in low foliage, mainly for insects and snails.

The song of this bird is a simple, loud, ringing sweet-sweet-sweet-sweet-sweet. The call is a loud, dry chip, like that of a hooded warbler. Its flight call is a loud seeep.

== Conservation status ==
Prothonotary warblers are declining in numbers due to loss of habitat. They also experience parasitism by the brown-headed cowbird (Molothrus ater), and are outcompeted for nest sites by the house wren (Troglodytes aedon). The warblers are listed as endangered in Canada, with approximately 30 individuals estimated to breed in Ontario as of 2008. The species persists in protected environments such as South Carolina's Francis Beidler Forest, which is currently home to more than 2,000 pairs, the densest known population.

== In culture ==
=== Art and literature ===
John James Audubon's painting of a prothonotary warbler is the third plate in The Birds of America.

The warbler has also been mentioned several times in literature. First, the warbler is mentioned in A Sand County Almanac by Aldo Leopold as the "jewel of my disease-ridden woodlot", "as proof that dead trees are transmuted into living animals, and vice versa. When you doubt the wisdom of this arrangement, take a look at the prothonotary." Second, Kurt Vonnegut described the warbler as "the only birds that are housebroken in captivity" in his novel, Jailbird.

=== The Hiss-Chambers Hearing ===
The prothonotary warbler became known to a wider audience in the 1940s as the bird that established a connection between Whittaker Chambers and Alger Hiss in front of the House Un-American Activities Committee.

On August 3, 1948, in a hearing before the committee, Chambers accused Hiss of being a communist spy who sought to infiltrate the U.S. government. Two days later, Hiss testified before the committee and claimed, among other things, that Chambers' allegations were false and that he did not know Chambers.

However, future U.S. president, Richard Nixon, who was then a freshman congressman on the committee, became convinced that Hiss had committed perjury at the hearing. To verify this suspicion, the committee had Chambers appear before it again on August 7, 1948, to testify about his relationship with Hiss. At that hearing, Chambers testified that Hiss enjoyed bird-watching, and once bragged to Chambers about seeing a prothonotary warbler along the Potomac River. When Hiss appeared before the committee again, he haphazardly confirmed spotting a prothonotary warbler on the Potomac, causing many members of the committee to become convinced of the pair's acquaintance. Ultimately, the Hiss-Chambers hearing has been credited with contributing to Nixon's political rise.

== Gallery ==
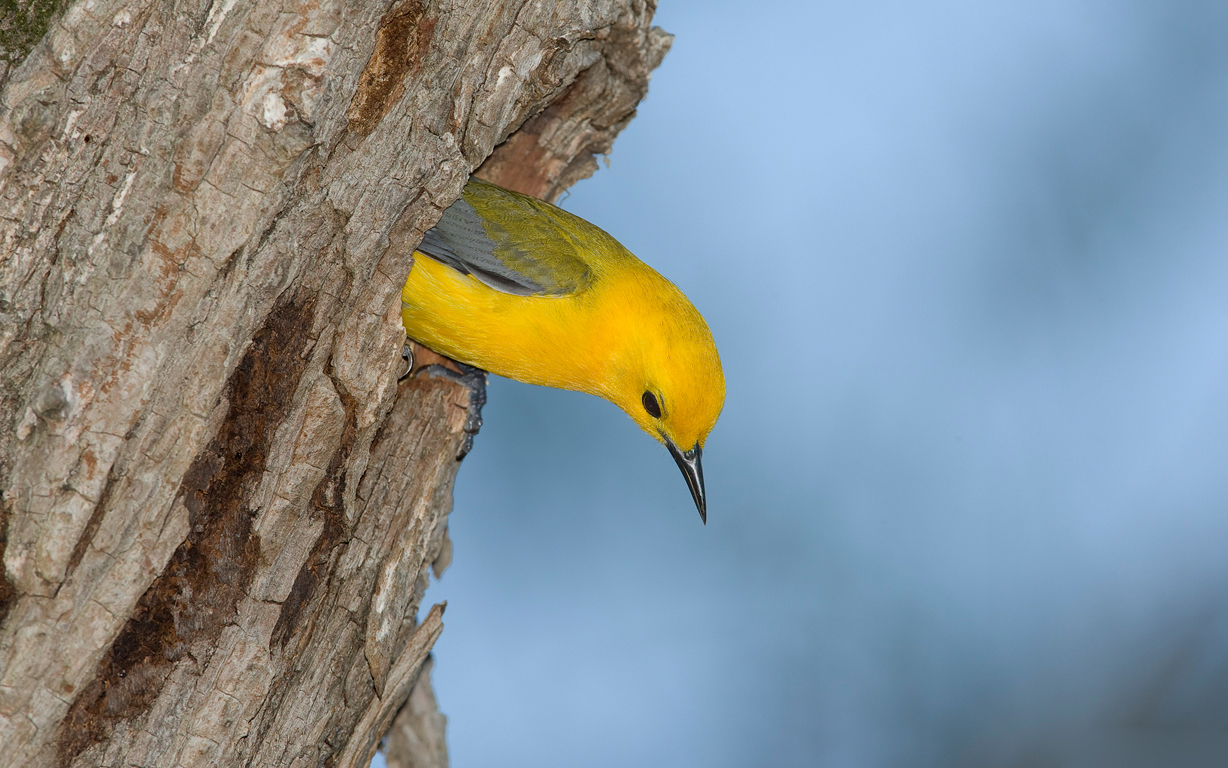
In a cavity nest

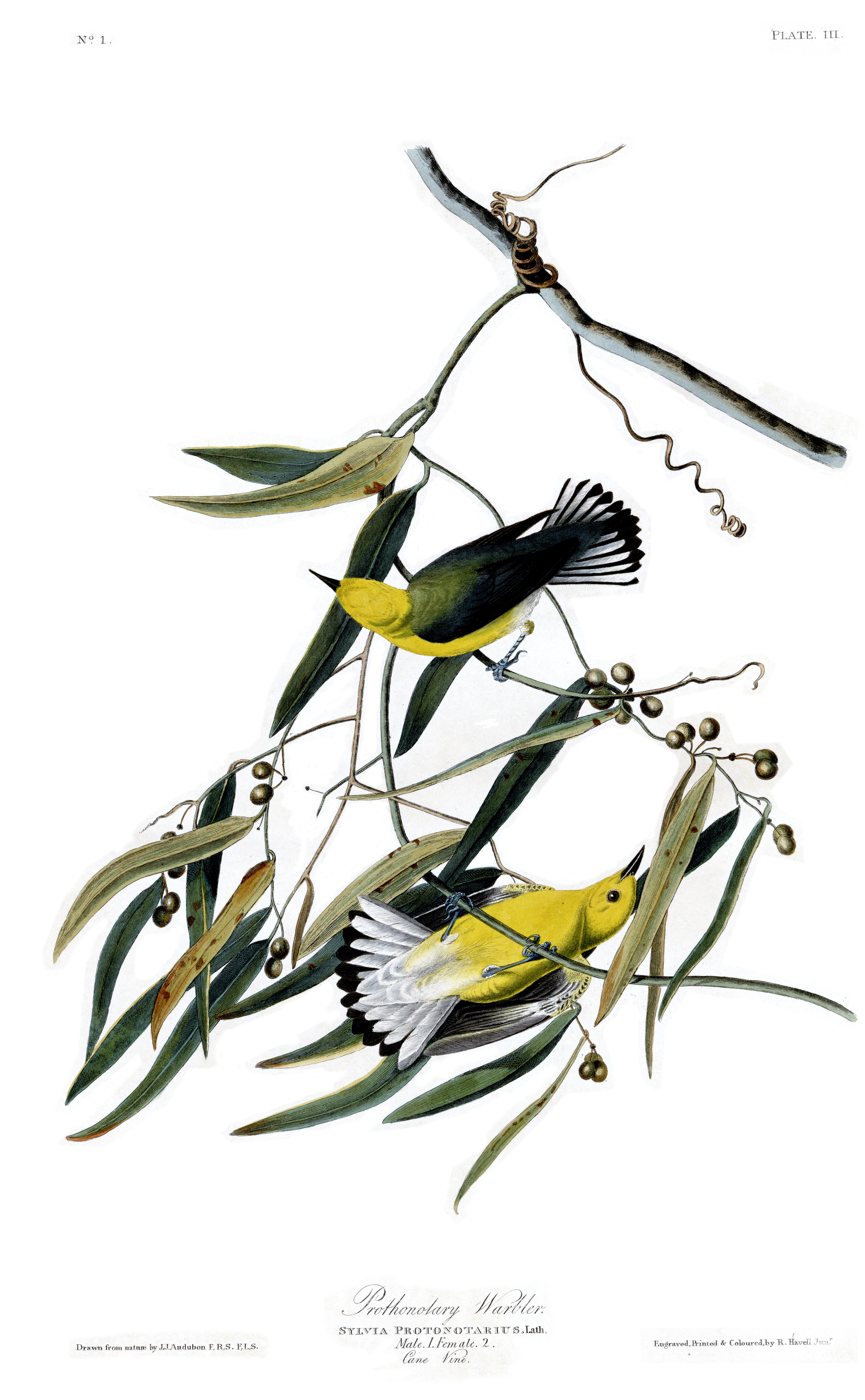
Painting by John James Audubon

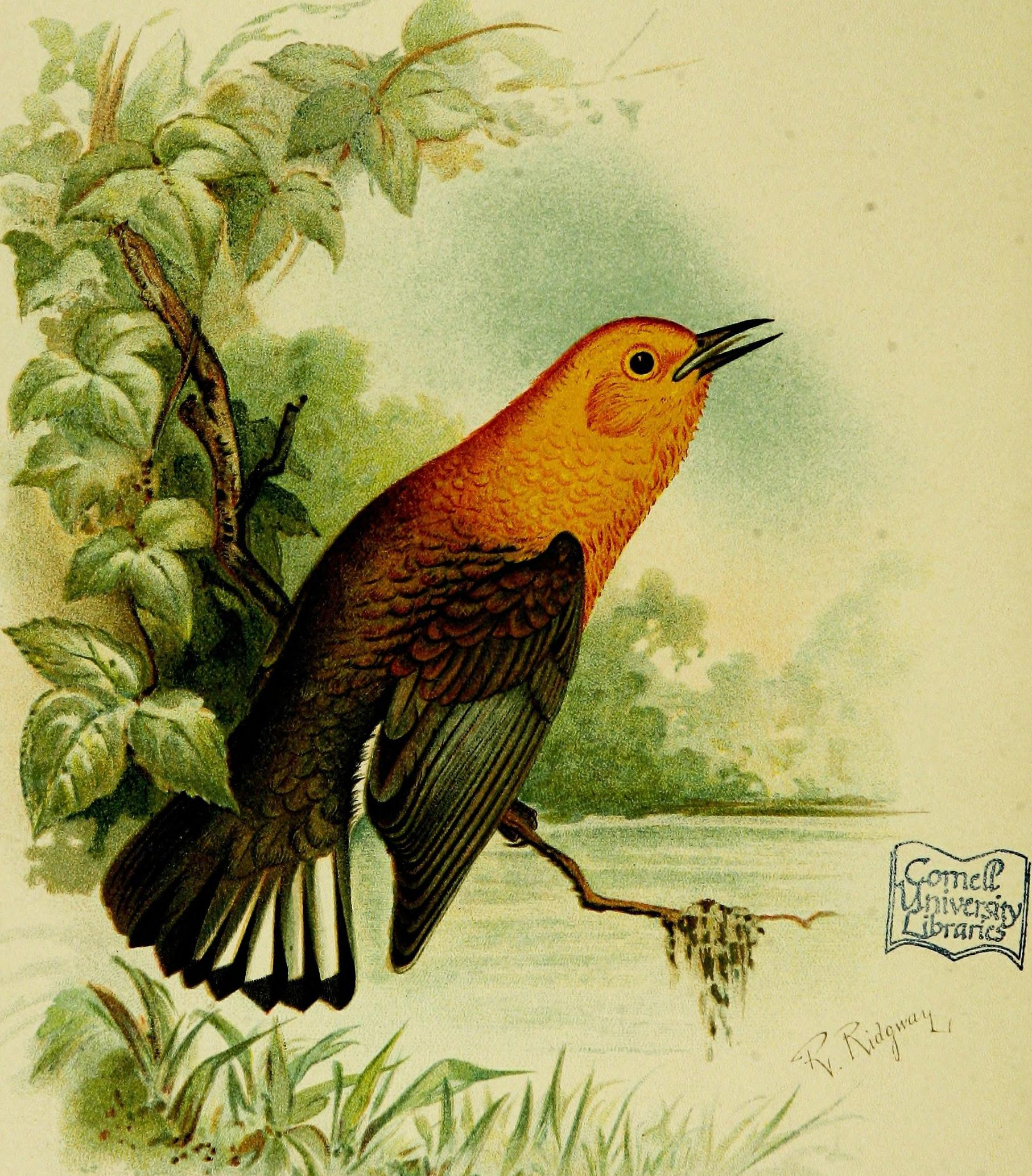
Painting by Robert Ridgway
