= Holly Trostle Brigham =

American painter (born 1965)

- Born: Holly Trostle; 1965 (age 60–61); Carlisle, Pennsylvania, United States
- Education: George Washington University (MFA), Pennsylvania Academy of the Fine Arts, University of Pittsburgh (MA), Smith College (BA)
- Known for: Painter
- Movement: Figurative painting, Feminist art
- Spouse: David R. Brigham
- Children: 2
- Website: www.hollytrostlebrigham.com

Holly Trostle Brigham (born 1965; née Holly Trostle) is an American figurative painter, whose feminist self-portraiture focuses on female subjects drawn from mythology and history.

== Background and education ==
Holly Trostle was born in 1965, in Carlisle, Pennsylvania, where she was raised.

She studied art history and Italian at Smith College and graduated with a BA degree, and continued graduate work in art history at the University of Pittsburgh.

Brigham then worked as an exhibition coordinator at the Philadelphia Museum of Art, and began studying painting at the Pennsylvania Academy of the Fine Arts in 1990, and enrolled in the certificate program, where she studied with artists Lou Sloan, Liz Osborne, and Dan Miller. She went on to earn her M.F.A. in 1994 in painting from George Washington University. At GWU, she worked closely with the artists Arthur Hall Smith and Doug Teller. GWU visiting artist Audrey Flack, who has said that “Holly Trostle Brigham is one of the most interesting young painters working today. She is pushing the depiction of the female figure into interesting new territory”.

She married art historian and educator, David R. Brigham, and together they have two children.

== Career and work ==
Brigham began exploring the self-portrait intensively as an M.F.A. student, starting by reclaiming the female nude from centuries of passive poses dominated by the male gaze. She portrays the nude woman as strong, self-possessed, and even godly, as many of her subjects come from mythology: “Inspired by Flack’s use of mythology, her concept of reclaiming the matriarchy and the way in which Flack talked about how women artists could approach the female nude without objectifying it since subject and object were one and the same, Brigham began a series of watercolors for which she, herself, posed as the nude model.”

Going “beyond the descriptive self-portrait”, Brigham then embarked on an ongoing series of paintings that merge her own history with art history, using self-portraiture to illuminate the lives of women artists and creators before her, such as in her Seven Sisters series.

The tremendous level of detail and iconography in her work invites the viewer to read her paintings as biography and autobiography intertwined: Brigham’s body performs the life of an historical figure while in turn, the choice and iconography of the figure reveal the events and concerns of Brigham’s own life, creating a “conflation of her self-image with their identities”. Brigham has stated that she often thinks of her work as “art history in reverse”: she began her education decoding the symbols and signifiers in the artwork of others, and now as an artist, she is encoding the emblems of her subjects.

Many of her paintings, such as Judith and Flora (2003) and Maria Sibylla Merian: Metamorphosis (2010), are intricate watercolors in “a muscular style with emphatic lights and darks reminiscent of the 1960s and 1970s work of Alfred Leslie”; but as in Zephyr, Angel, Wings and Me (2002), Brigham also uses oil paint. More recently, she has begun using found objects and sculpted relics to develop her themes in three dimensions, as in Hildegard’s Box (2013).

Brigham has collaborated with the renowned poet Marilyn Nelson on a project called Sacred Sisters that resulted in an exhibition at the William Benton Museum of Art at the University of Connecticut, Storrs, and Penn State Lehigh Valley, as well as in an artist book.

Brigham has been artist in resident at the Experimental Printmaking Institute (EPI) at Lafayette College, and has held many teaching positions, including posts at Pasadena City College, Worcester State College, Worcester Art Museum, and the Baum School of Art in Allentown, Pennsylvania. Featured at Art W Salon in New York and Evolve the Conversation in Philadelphia, she has also lectured at colleges, museums, and at the national meeting of the College Art Association in a panel on contemporary portraiture organized by Brandon Fortune, Senior Curator at the National Portrait Gallery.

== Selected exhibitions ==
- Holly Trostle Brigham: Mothers, Sisters, and Daughters, Reading Public Museum, 2023
- Holly Trostle Brigham: I Wake Again, Delaware Art Museum, 2022
- Sacred Sisters, Sordoni Art Gallery, Wilkes University, 2019
- Holly Trostle Brigham: Seven, Grossman Gallery, Lafayette College, 2015
- Holly Trostle Brigham: Dis/Guise, Luther W. Brady Art Gallery at George Washington University, 2014
- Holly Trostle Brigham: Painted Dichotomies, Berman Museum of Art at Ursinus College, 2013
- Home Front Heroes: Women of World War II, The Gallery at Penn State Lehigh Valley, 2012
- Cradle and Crucible: The Enduring Legacy of the Pennsylvania Academy of the Fine Arts, Avery Galleries, 2011
- Reflected Personae, Ahlum Gallery, 2005

== Public collections ==
- Reading Public Museum
- Delaware Art Museum
- Pennsylvania Academy of the Fine Arts
- National Museum of Women in the Arts
- Smithsonian Institution
- Smith College Museum of Art
- Mount Holyoke College Art Museum
- Georgia Museum of Art
- Swarthmore College
- Fisher Fine Arts Library at the University of Pennsylvania
- Penn State University
- Bates College
- Baylor University
- University of Iowa
- Worcester Art Museum

== Limited-edition artist books ==
Currently completing her fourth book, Brigham’s first was Sacred Sisters and was a collaboration with award-winning poet Marilyn Nelson and book artist MaryAnn Miller. The second book, Mother Monument, became a collaboration with Miller and eight women poets including Kim Bridgford and Marilyn Nelson. The third artist book was I Wake Again, which was based on the Pre-Raphaelite artist, Elizabeth Siddal. This book’s poet was Kim Bridgford, a long-time friend. This book was the catalyst for the exhibition ’I Wake Again’: Holly Trostle Brigham on Elizabeth Siddal at the Delaware Art Museum in spring 2022. The Museum purchased the artist book from this project. The fourth book is called Poor Persis and is being completed currently in the summer of 2023. Angela Alaimo O’Donnell, faculty at Fordham University is the poet. Brigham's artists' books have been collected by numerous museums and special collections libraries, including the Beinecke Library at Yale University, the Smithsonian Institution, and the National Museum of Women in the Arts.

== Awards ==
- 2004, Honorable Mention, Pennsylvania Academy of the Fine Arts
- 2004, Best of Show, Lancaster County Art Association, Strasberg, Pennsylvania
- 2004, First Prize for Watercolor, Harrisburg Art Association, Harrisburg, Pennsylvania
- 2003, Award of Excellence, Artists Guild of Delaware Valley
- 1992, David Lloyd Kreeger Prize in Painting, The George Washington University
- 1992, Cecille R. Hunt Prize (for watercolor), The George Washington University
