= Pine Point Research Natural Area =

Protected wooded area in Minnesota

- Interactive map of Pine Point Research Natural Area
- Location: Cass County, Minnesota
- Coordinates: 47°7′52.83″N 94°33′19.09″W
- Area: 1,239 acres (5.01 km^{2})
- Established: 1932
- Owner: Federal

U.S. National Natural Landmark
- Designated: 1980

Pine Point Research Natural Area is a natural area that is protected by the United States Department of Agriculture, specifically through the branch of the Forest Service. It was established in 1932 and consists of 1,375 acres (5.56 km^{2}) of land. It is located in Cass County, Minnesota and is part of the Chippewa National Forest. The natural area is bounded on the north, east, and west sides by Lake Leech. To the south is Onigum, an unincorporated community that had been an Indian agency.

== Ecology ==
Pine Point is a forested area that consists mostly of jack pine and red pine, as well as areas of meadow. It also contains a 24-acre (97,000 m^{2}) lake and 493 acres (2.00 km^{2}) of marshland.

White-tailed deer (Odocoileus virginianus), black bear (Ursus americanus), snowshoe hare (Lepus americanus), and North American porcupine (Erethizon dorsatum) are common in the area.

== Natural Landmark designation ==
The area has been designated a National Natural Landmark under the Historic Sites Act. It received this designation in 1980 from the United States Secretary of the Interior, giving it recognition as an outstanding example of the nation's natural history. The designation describes it as containing "undisturbed stands of red and mixed pine that have been protected for over 70 years. The site provides nesting habitat for the bald eagle and osprey".

=== Modern use ===
The natural area is open to the public but has no roads or marked trails. Research projects within Pine Point Research Natural Area must be approved by the United States Forest Service.
