= Jeffrey Lynn Stephanic =

Photographer and artist

Jeffrey Lynn Stephanic (born 28 July 1946; known professionally as Jeff Stephanic) is a fine art photographer, designer, color theorist, digital artist, and educator. He is known for traditional black and white photography, revival of hand-colored photographic technique, and as an early practitioner of digital photography, having recognised and advocated for the computer as a fine art medium.

== Life ==
Stephen Stephanic, born in Canton, Ohio, an industrial town situated in the northeast rust belt of Ohio, is the eldest among four siblings in the Stephanic family, born to parents Edwin and Patsye Stephanic. His professional journey commenced with a service in the U.S. Navy from 1965 to 1968. Subsequent to his military service, Stephanic returned to pursue further education and embarked on a career path as a fine art photographer and educator.

== Art education and career ==
Early in 1970 he enrolled in Northern Virginia Community College, Alexandria, Virginia where he began formal studies in art. He subsequently enrolled in The George Washington University, Washington, DC (GWU) where fine arts classes were offered at the Corcoran School of Art as well GWU campus. He earned a BA degree in Fine Arts in 1977. In the fall of that year he was accepted into the Fine Arts Graduate Program and was awarded a Graduate Teaching Fellowship. Stephanic earned a Master in Fine Arts, Photography in 1980. His work with hand-colored photography put him among those on the cusp of a revival of the process in fine art photography. Stephanic joined the GWU faculty as a full-time and tenure track visiting professor of Photography in 1980. Among his art faculty colleagues was the noted Washington painter Arthur Hall Smith, He moved to associate professor of Photography and then to associate professor of design in 1991, a position he held until his academic retirement in 2012. He currently holds the position of Associate Professor Emeritus from The George Washington University.

Stephanic introduced digital photography and computer design to the GWU art curriculum. He developed a prototype multimedia resource for the National Bonsai Foundation for the National Bonsai and Penjing Museum, U.S. National Arboretum, Washington, DC in 1996. In 2007 he became the Director of the Summer Distant Learning Initiative (later known as the Online Learning Initiative). His experience with the new technology paved the way forward for online learning at the university. His professional career as an educator and as an exhibiting artist continued simultaneously. He served as a juror in art competitions including Herndon Festival of Fine Arts Show, Council for the arts of the Herndon, Herndon, VA in 1991 and the National Photographic Exhibition: Westmoreland Arts & Heritage Festival, Greensburg, PA, 1988, 1993, and 1998.

== Exhibitions ==
Stephanic's professional exhibition record includes both national and international shows. In 1999 his exhibit at Galerie Lee in Paris, France resulted in five of his works being accepted into the permanent collection of the Bibliothèque nationale de France. Three of the works were hand-colored photographs and two were digital prints. Stephanic was represented in Washington, DC by Anton Gallery from 2000 to 2006. He participated in numerous shows including "Monuments" (July 13-August 25, 2001), "Jeff Stephanic: Within Sight," A selection of these prints is included in the permanent collection of the University of Maryland University College. As a member of the art faculty at The George Washington University, Stephanic's work was shown frequently in the Dimock Gallery, George Washington Art Galleries. His work was also shown at the Fine Arts Center Gallery, Charles County Community College, La Plata, MD., now named The Tony Hungerford Memorial Gallery, College of Southern Maryland.

== Exhibitions ==
- "Scenes of Southern Italy" World Bank, Washington, DC (1984)
- "4th Annual Brandeis Juried Art Exhibit" Strathmore Hall, Rockville, MD (1985)
- "Color and Photography" Rathbone Gallery, Albany, NY (1987)
- "Hand-colored Silver Prints" Pittsburgh Filmmakers' Gallery, Pittsburgh, PA (1988)
- "Current Trends in Digital Imaging" Tyler Gallery, Northern Virginia Community College, Alexandria, VA (1997)
- "Jeffrey Stephanic: photographie en giclée et colorié å la main" Galerie Lee, Paris France, 1999
- "Monuments" Anton Gallery, Washington, DC, 2001
- "Winthin Sight: digital photographs" Anton Gallery, Washington DC, 2002

== Collections ==
Stephanic's work is in numerous private and public collections including:

- University of Maryland University College, College Park, MD
- Bibliothèque Nationale de France, Prints and Photographs collection (reference number Ep-3972-Boite Fol.), Paris, France
- The George Washington University, Washington, DC
- The College of Southern Maryland, La Plata, MD

== Recognition and awards ==
- Art Directors Club of Metropolitan Washington Award of Excellence, Washington, DC, 1977
- David lloyd Kreeger Prize in Photography, The George Washington University, Washington, DC, 1979
- Printing Industries of America First Prize, Poster Division, Warrendale, PA, 1982
- Academic Excellence Award Web site designed for the National Bonsai Foundation and National Bonsai and Penjing Museum, U.S. National Arboretum, Washington, DC.

== Publications ==
- "Jeffrey L. Stephanic: Hand-Colored Silver Prints" Alexandria, VA (1986)
- "A Most Remarkable Man: J. Willard Marriott" The Marriott Corporation, Bethesda, MD ( 1986)
- "Jeffrey Stephanic/photographs - Douglas H Teller/watercolors" Dimock Gallery, Art Department, The George Washington University, Washington, DC (1989)
- "Jeff Stephanic: A 2006 Portfolio" Alexandria, VA (2006)

== General references ==
- "Jeffrey Lynn Stephanic" Marquis Who's Who in the East, 21st edition, 1966–1987. Macmillan Directory Division, (1987) p. 767
- "Photography by Jeffery L. Stephanic" exhibition review, The Repository, North Canton, OH (1986)
- "JCA Photography Exhibit Innovative" exhibition review, Times Union, Albany, NY (April, 1987)
- "9/11/01" exhibition review, The Washington Times (October 13, 2001)
- "Monumental Exhibition at Anton Gallery" exhibition review, The Washington Times (August 4, 2001) p. D5
- Artist's Quarter" exhibition review, GWMagazine (Spring, 2007) p. 51
