= Lac la Croix Research Natural Area =

Wilderness area in Saint Louis County, Minnesota

- Interactive map of Lac la Croix Research Natural Area
- Location: Saint Louis County, Minnesota
- Coordinates: 48°20′N 92°7′W
- Area: 973 acres (3.94 km^{2})
- Established: 1942

U.S. National Natural Landmark
- Designated: 1980

Lac la Croix Research Natural Area is a natural area that is protected by the United States Department of Agriculture, specifically through the branch of the Forest Service. It was established in 1942 and consists of 973 acres (3.94 km^{2}) of land. It is located in St. Louis County, Minnesota and is part of the Superior National Forest.

== Ecology ==
Lac la Croix is a forested area that consists mostly of red and white pine trees. It is one of the few remaining unmodified sections of "virgin pine" in the United States. Moose, black bear, and white-tailed deer are common in the area.

== Conservation ==
The area was established as a Research Natural Area by the U. S. Forest Service in 1942. In February 1980 the United States Secretary of the Interior designated Lac la Croix Research Natural Area as a National Natural Landmark under the Historic Sites Act. This designation recognized the area as an outstanding example of the United States' natural history. The National Park Service describes the area as "old-growth virgin pine forests . . . [which] contains most of the physiographic and ecological features characteristic of the Boundary Waters region."
