= Killington Village, Vermont =

Census-designated place in Vermont, United States

- Census-designated place
- Location within Vermont Location within the United States
- Coordinates: 43°38′05″N 72°46′34″W
- Country: United States
- State: Vermont
- County: Rutland
- Town: Killington

Area
  - Total: 6.01 sq mi (15.57 km^{2})
  - Land: 5.94 sq mi (15.39 km^{2})
  - Water: 0.069 sq mi (0.18 km^{2})
- Elevation: 1,755 ft (535 m)

Population (2020)
  - Total: 861
- Time zone: UTC-5 (Eastern (EST))
  - Summer (DST): UTC-4 (EDT)
- ZIP Code: 05751 (Killington)
- Area code: 802
- FIPS code: 50-37750
- GNIS feature ID: 2807150

Killington Village is a census-designated place (CDP) in the town of Killington, Rutland County, Vermont, United States, comprising residential development associated with Killington Ski Resort. As of the 2020 census, Killington Village had a population of 861, out of 1,407 people in the entire town.

== Geography ==
The CDP is in eastern Rutland County, within the Green Mountains, along both sides of Killington Road, which runs south 4 miles (6 km) from U.S. Route 4 to the Killington ski area. Route 4 runs through the northern part of the CDP from Sherburne Pass in the west to the valley of the Ottauquechee River in the east, then turns south at Sherburne Center and forms the eastern border of the CDP. North of Route 4, the CDP extends to Kent Pond and includes part of Gifford Woods State Park. The Appalachian Trail crosses the northern part of the CDP.
