= Keeley Creek Natural Area =

Protected area of Lake County, Minnesota

- Interactive map of Keeley Creek Natural Area
- Location: Lake County, Minnesota
- Coordinates: 47°47′23.5″N 91°42′22.52″W
- Area: 1,180 acres (4.8 km^{2})
- Established: 1942

U.S. National Natural Landmark
- Designated: 1980

Keeley Creek Natural Area is a Research Natural Area and a National Natural Landmark that is protected by the United States Department of Agriculture, specifically through the branch of the Forest Service. It is located in Stony River Township, in Lake County, Minnesota, and is part of the Superior National Forest.

== History of Keeley Creek Natural Area ==
In 1942, 640-acre (2.6 km^{2}) of land was designated a Research Natural Area. The National Park Service describes the area as "a large tract of undisturbed mixed pine and black spruce forest with rare mature jackpine stands and significant upland bogs". In February 1980, the United States Secretary of the Interior designated a 1,180-acre (4.8 km^{2}) area, including Keeley Creek Natural Area, as a National Natural Landmark under the Historic Sites Act. This designation recognizes the area as an outstanding example of the United States' natural history.

== Ecology ==
Keeley Creek is a forested area that consists mainly of native fir trees including mostly Jackpine and Black Spruce. White-tailed deer, snowshoe rabbit, and ruffed grouse are common in the area. In the 21st century, the make-up of the Keeley Creek is changing due to fire suppression. Fire benefits Jack pines and black spruce by causing germination of their seeds and by clearing the forest canopy, allowing more direct sunlight for young trees. Without fire, jack pines and spruce can be overtaken by more shade-tolerant plants.
