= List of National Natural Landmarks in Utah =

There are 4 National Natural Landmarks in Utah.

Utah National Natural Landmarks (clickable map)

Name	Image	Date	Location	County	Ownership	Description
Cleveland-Lloyd Dinosaur Quarry		October 1965	Cleveland 39.32282°N 110.689509°W	Emery	federal/Bureau of Land Management	A possible predator trap that now contains over 15,000 Jurassic dinosaur fossils.
Joshua Tree Natural Area		1966		Washington	federal/Beaver Dam Wash National Conservation Area	The only Joshua tree forest in Utah and the northernmost stand of tree yuccas in the country.
Little Rockies		1975		Garfield	federal/Glen Canyon National Recreation Area	Exposures of intrusive plugs or stocks with associated sills, dikes and laccoliths, all of which were first studied, described and named there.
Neffs Canyon Caves		1977		Salt Lake	federal/Wasatch National Forest	An excellent example of a cave formed by the capture of a surface stream

== See also ==
- List of National Historic Landmarks in Utah
