= Four Hole Swamp =

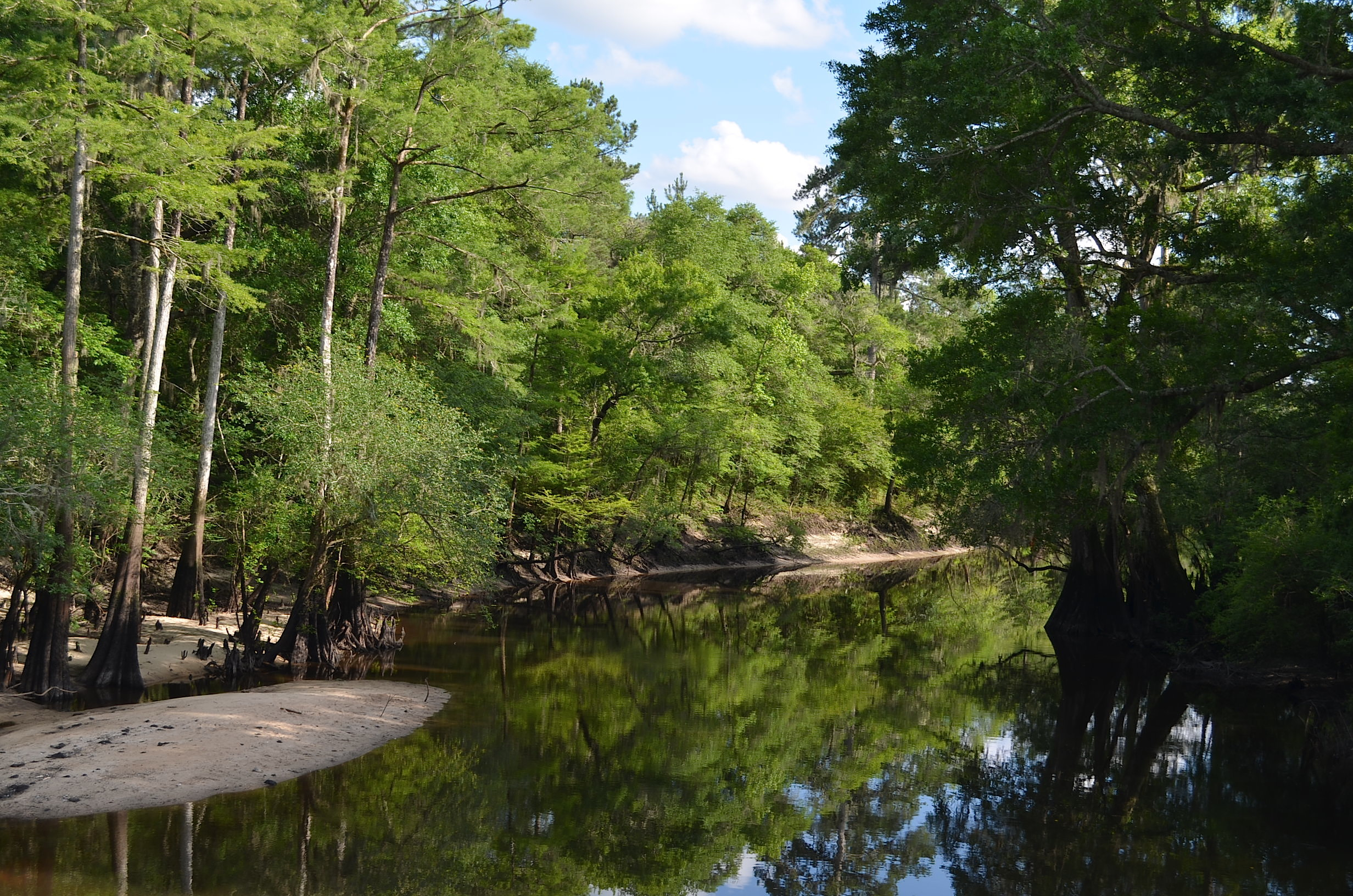

Physical characteristics
- Source
  - coordinates: 33°36′05″N 80°46′10″W
- Mouth
  - coordinates: 33°03′05″N 80°24′15″W

Four Hole Swamp is a small blackwater river that is a tributary to the Edisto River in South Carolina. The swamp rises in Calhoun County and flows 62 miles (100 km) to the confluence. The river is noteworthy for its unusual braided pattern; it has no well-defined channel but instead has multiple channels that start and disappear, maintaining a flow.

The swamp is the home of the Francis Beidler Forest, an 18,000-acre (73 km^{2}) nature preserve containing over 1,800 acres of virgin cypress and tupelo forest owned and operated by the National Audubon Society. Some of the trees are over 1500 years in age, and the forest is the home of a number of rare or endangered species.
