= List of National Natural Landmarks in South Carolina =

There are six National Natural Landmarks in the U.S. state of South Carolina.

South Carolina National Natural Landmarks (clickable map)

Name	Image	Date	Location	County	Ownership	Description
Congaree River Swamp		October 1974	Columbia 33°47′N 80°47′W	Richland	federal	The most extensive, mature cypress-gum swamp and bottomland hardwood forest complex in the State and a sanctuary for wildlife. Part of Congaree National Park.
Flat Creek Natural Area and 40 Acre Rock		August 1984	Kershaw 34°40′8″N 80°31′38″W	Lancaster	state	Contains the largest remaining undisturbed granitic flat-rock outcrop in the Carolina Piedmont. Flat-rock vegetation is in good condition, including 13 rare or endemic species and 20 other species characteristic of these outcrops. Flat Creek Dike is one of the thickest in eastern North America at 1,123 ft (342 m). Part of 40 Acre Rock Heritage Preserve.
Francis Beidler Forest		March 1979	Harleyville 33°14′N 80°21′W	Berkeley & Dorchester	private	One of the last large virgin stands of bald cypress-tupelo gum swamp in the United States, with five major community types providing for a rich diversity of species.
John de la Howe Forest		January 1976	McCormick 33°56′N 82°24′W	McCormick	state	An old-growth stand of oak-pine forest protected against fire and timbering since 1797, and one of the best remaining examples of this type of forest in the Piedmont.
St. Phillips Island		May 1986	Beaufort 32°17′N 80°37′W	Beaufort	private	This barrier island is approximately 4 miles (6.4 km) in length and 2 miles (3.2 km) wide. It is unique among the barrier islands of Georgia, South Carolina and northern Florida, because it exists in a nearly undisturbed state with minimal development and past consumptive use; it is also unique to the entire Atlantic Coast for the pronounced multiple vegetated beach dune ridges found here.
Stevens Creek Natural Area		March 1979	Plum Branch 33°50′39″N 82°13′27″W	McCormick	state	Pleistocene relict ecosystem harboring flora considered unusual for its combination of plants in this southern location due to unique microenvironmental conditions. Part of Stevens Creek Heritage Preserve.

== See also ==
- List of National Natural Landmarks
- List of National Historic Landmarks in South Carolina
