= Church of Our Saviour (Killington, Vermont) =

Historic church in Vermont, United States

- Mission of the Church of Our Saviour and Mission Farm
- U.S. National Register of Historic Places
- U.S. Historic district
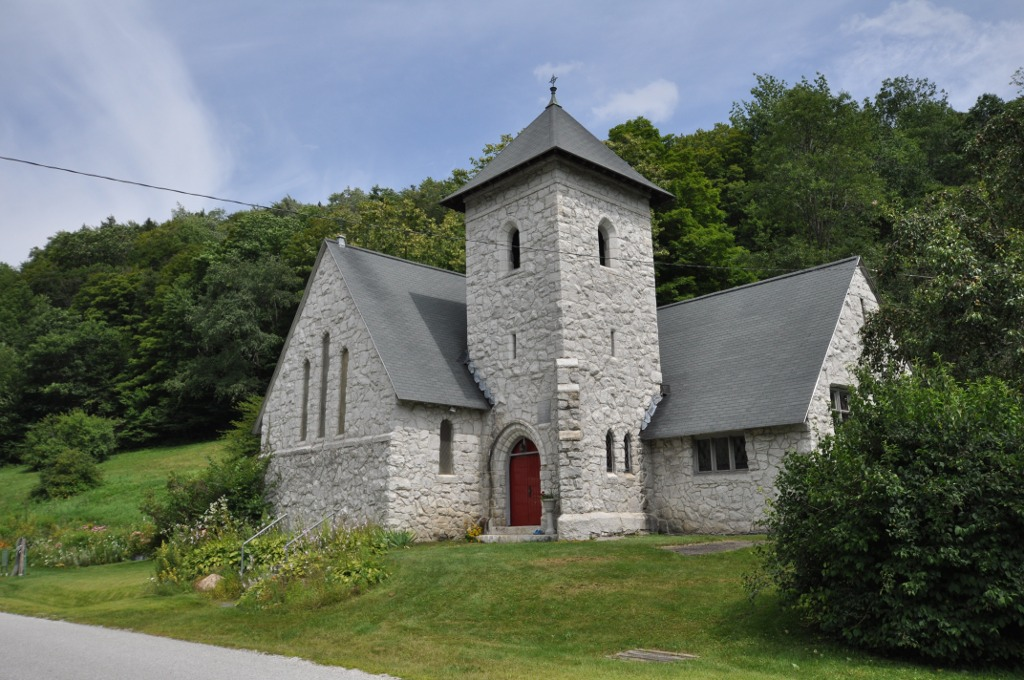

- Location within Vermont Location within the United States
- Location: 316 Mission Farm Road, Killington, Vermont
- Coordinates: 43°37′9″N 72°45′25″W
- Area: 34 acres (14 ha)
- Built: 1817
- Architect: Smith, Arthur H.
- Architectural style: Gothic, Georgian plan
- NRHP reference No.: 92001479
- Added to NRHP: October 29, 1992

The Church of Our Saviour, also known as the Church of Our Saviour at Mission Farm, the Mission of the Church of Our Saviour, and the Josiah Wood Jr. Farm, is a historic Episcopal church and farm complex located at 316 Mission Farm Road, in Killington, Vermont. The church is a Gothic Revival stone building, built in 1894-95 of Vermont granite. In addition to the church, the 170-acre (69 ha) Mission Farm property includes a c. 1817 farmhouse, a guest and retreat house, a vicarage, a bakery and agricultural buildings. On October 29, 1992, it was added to the National Register of Historic Places. The Rev. Lisa Ransom is the Executive Director of Mission Farm and Vicar of The Church of Our Saviour.

The church reported 11 members in 2019 and 54 members in 2023; no membership statistics were reported in 2024 parochial reports. Plate and pledge income reported for the congregation in 2024 was $35,831 with average Sunday attendance (ASA) of 19 persons. This was a relative decrease from ASA of 46 reported in 2023.

== Description and history ==
The Church of Our Saviour and Mission Farm are located on the east side of the Ottauquechee River, roughly across the river from the Killington Ski Resort to the west. The developed portion of the property is roughly bisected by Mission Farm Road (an old alignment of United States Route 4), with the historic farm complex on the west side and the church on the east side. The main farmhouse is a 2 1/2-story wood-frame structure, with a gabled roof and clapboard siding, with an attached converted carriage barn. The church, standing directly across the street, is a stone structure, with its tall main block oriented perpendicular to the street, a shorter cross-gabled side ell, and a square tower in the crook of the joint between those sections. Further south on the property stands a smaller wood-frame building that now serves as a bakery.

The farmhouse was built about 1817 by Josiah Wood, Jr., whose father was one of Killington's early settlers. The house is one of the best-preserved examples of period residential architecture in eastern Rutland County. Wood raised a large family here, operated a tavern, and was responsible for construction of the road. The property remained in the hands of various Wood family members, until it was repurchased in 1894 by Wood's daughter, Elizabeth Wood Clement, who then donated it to the Episcopal Diocese of Vermont for use as a mission site. The church, built in 1894–95, was designed by Rutland-based English architect Arthur H. Smith, then one of central Vermont's leading architects. The church maintains an active mission, and the farm's fields continue to see some agricultural uses.

== See also ==
- National Register of Historic Places listings in Rutland County, Vermont
