= Francis Beidler Forest =

Wildlife sanctuary in South Carolina, US

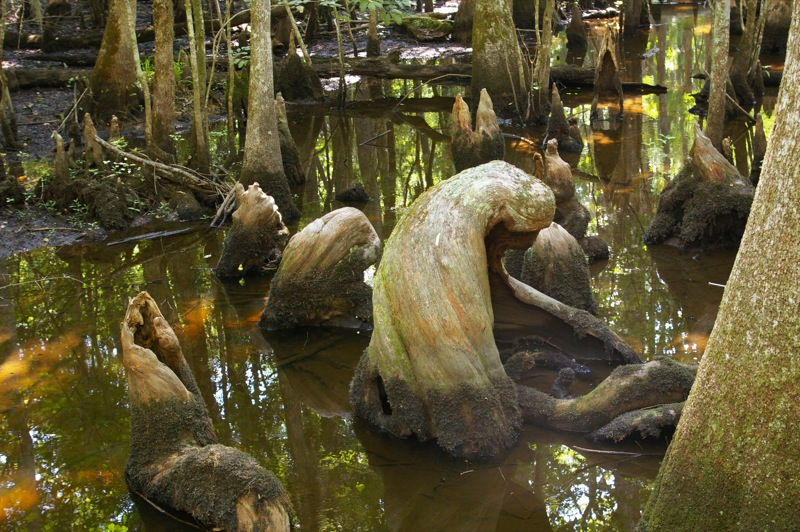
- Cypress knees from the Beidler Forest.

- Location within South Carolina Location within the United States
- Location: South-central South Carolina
- Coordinates: 33°14′02″N 80°21′40″W
- Area: 16,000 acres (6,500 ha)
- Governing body: National Audubon Society
- Website: beidlerforest.audubon.org

Ramsar Wetland
- Designated: 30 May 2008
- Reference no.: 1773

U.S. National Natural Landmark
- Designated: 1979

The Francis Beidler Forest is an Audubon wildlife sanctuary in Four Holes Swamp, a blackwater creek system in South Carolina, United States. It consists of over 18,000 acres (73 km²) of mainly bald cypress and tupelo gum hardwood forest and swamp with approximately 1,800 acres (7 km^{2}) of old-growth forest. It is the largest virgin stand of cypress-tupelo forest in the world, with some Bald Cypress trees over 1,000 years old. It is a common spot for birdwatchers and is used for biological research projects by area schools.

The preserve was established to protect one of only two stands of old-growth forest in South Carolina. It was designated a National Natural Landmark in 1979. On May 30, 2008 the forest was designated a Ramsar Wetland of International Importance. In 2020, Four Holes Swamp was designated a site on the National Park Service's Underground Railroad - Network to Freedom program.

== History ==
The land was acquired by Francis Beidler in the 1890s, and maintained by his family after his death in 1924. On liquidation of the estate, the National Audubon Society raised the funds to acquire the land, built a boardwalk, and purchase land from surrounding farmers to ensure access. In 2003 the Audubon Society, which maintains the preserve, announced it had recently obtained funding with which to purchase an additional 909 acres of adjacent land to expand the preserve. Other similar adjacent lands have been protected to total over 18,000 acres as of 2021.

== Facilities ==
It has an environmental education center and a 1.75-mile (2.82 km) boardwalk trail through the old-growth portion of the swamp, established in 1977. During the spring, there are guided canoe trips in the swamp which offer a different perspective. Night walks are also offered on a monthly basis. A new woodland and grassland trail system was opened in 2020. These trails are accessed by a gravel parking lot adjacent to the entrance gate at Beidler; the trails are open every day from sunrise to sunset.

== Location ==
336 Sanctuary Road, Harleyville, South Carolina 29448

== See also ==
- List of National Natural Landmarks in South Carolina

== Sources ==
- National Recreation Trails: Francis Beidler Forest
- Southern Forests: Francis Beidler Forest
- Text of The Francis Beidler Forest in Four Holes Swamp
- Francis Beidler - text from guidebook
