= Chazy Fossil Reef =

U.S National Natural Landmark

- Stromatoporoid at Fisk Quarry, Isle La Motte, Vermont

- Location within Vermont Location within New York Location within the United States
- Location: Clinton County, New York; Grand Isle County, Vermont
- Coordinates: 44°51′10″N 73°20′24″W
- Area: 1,567 acres (6.34 km^{2})
- Governing body: Mixed (federal, state, and private)

U.S. National Natural Landmark
- Designated: May 2009

Chazy Fossil Reef is a United States National Natural Landmark spanning three Lake Champlain islands in Clinton County, New York, and Grand Isle County, Vermont. The site is recognized as the oldest known diverse fossil reef in the world, and contains fossils that demonstrate faunal succession. The 1,567-acre (6.34 km^{2}) site was dedicated as a National Natural Landmark in May 2009.

== Location ==
The Chazy Fossil Reef National Natural Landmark includes three islands in Lake Champlain. Included within the designated area are two preserves on Vermont's Isle La Motte; the 20-acre (8.1 ha) Fisk Quarry Preserve and the 83-acre (34 ha) Goodsell Ridge Preserve are both open to the public and managed by the Isle La Motte Preservation Trust. New York's Valcour Island and Garden Island are also included as part of the landmark.

== Fossils ==
The reef is an observable portion of the larger Chazy Formation which extends from Quebec to Tennessee. The location features an exposed Ordovician fossil reef, approximately 450 to 480 million years old, containing fossils from what was once a tropical marine environment. The site is recognized as the oldest known fossil reef that contains substantial biological diversity.

Strata from successive periods of time may be viewed across the landscape due to the tilted orientation of the sedimentary rock layers. The presence of fossils from a continuous time series allow for the observation of faunal succession. On Isle La Motte, the oldest fossils occur at the southern end of the island, with progressively newer layers visible toward the island's north end.

Among the preserved specimens are prehistoric stromatoporoids, gastropods, cephalopods, echinoderms, brachiopods, sponges, coral, bryozoa and stromatolites.

== See also ==
- List of National Natural Landmarks in New York
- List of National Natural Landmarks in Vermont
