= List of National Natural Landmarks in Virgin Islands =

From List of National Natural Landmarks, these are the National Natural Landmarks in Virgin Islands. There are 7 in total.

	Name	Image	Date	Location	District	Ownership	Description
1	Coki Point Cliffs		1980		St. Thomas	mixed- territorial, private	One of the rare localities on St. Thomas Island where fossils are found.
2	Green Cay National Wildlife Refuge		1980		St. Croix	federal	Nesting ground for the American oyster catcher, brown pelican and other shore birds.
3	Lagoon Point		1980		Saint John	mixed- territorial, private	An excellent example of a Caribbean fringing reef
4	Sandy Point National Wildlife Refuge	Sandy Point National Wildlife Refuge	1980		St. Croix	federal	Regularly used for nesting by the endangered leatherback sea turtle.
5	Salt River Bay	Salt Bay	1980		St. Croix	mixed- federal, private	The best remaining stands of mangrove in the Virgin Islands.
6	Vagthus Point		1980		St. Croix	private	The best-known locality for Upper Cretaceous fossils in the Virgin Islands.
7	West End Cays		1980		St. Thomas	territorial	One of the few nesting sites for species such as the blue-faced booby and the Bahama duck and the brown pelican.
