= Art Smith =

Art Smith may refer to:

- Art Smith (actor) (1899–1973), film and television supporting actor
- Art Smith (baseball) (1906–1995), American pitcher
- Art Smith (chef) (born 1960), personal chef to Oprah Winfrey and cookbook author
- Art Smith (ice hockey, born 1906) (1906–1962), National Hockey League player with Toronto and Ottawa
- Art Smith (ice hockey, fl. 1952–1956)
- Art Smith (jeweler) (1917–1982), Cuban-American modernist jeweler
- Art Smith (pilot) (1890–1926), American pilot
- Art Smith (American football) (1915–2010), American football and basketball coach
- Art Smith, character in Action

== See also ==
- Arthur Smith (disambiguation)
