= David R. Brigham =

American educator

David R. Brigham is an American educator, academic administrator, curator, and art historian. He served as President of the Pennsylvania Academy of the Fine Arts (PAFA) in Philadelphia. He is the CEO of the Historical Society of Pennsylvania, starting in fall 2020.

== Biography ==
A native of Hartford, Connecticut, Brigham studied English and accounting at the University of Connecticut; before pursuing a master's degree in museum studies/American civilization, and a doctorate degree in American civilization at the University of Pennsylvania.

Brigham had served as executive director of the Allentown Museum of Art, from 2002 to 2007; and the director of collections and exhibitions and curator of American Art at the Worcester Art Museum in Massachusetts, from 1996 to 2002. He is the author of Public Culture in the Early Republic: Charles Wilson Peale's Museum and Its Audience (1995).

From 2010 to 2020, Brigham served as president and CEO of the Pennsylvania Academy of the Fine Arts (PAFA) in Philadelphia.

Brigham is married to Holly Trostle Brigham, together they had two children.
