= List of National Natural Landmarks in Vermont =

There are 12 National Natural Landmarks in Vermont.

Vermont National Natural Landmarks (clickable map)

Name	Image	Date	Location	County	Ownership	Description
Battell Biological Preserve		1976		Addison	private	A pristine, climax, New England forest.
Barton River Marsh		1973		Orleans	state	A large, shallow, freshwater marsh considered one of the best in New England.
Camel's Hump	Camel's Hump	1968	44.319547°N 72.886328°W	Chittenden, Washington	state	Supports the second largest extent of alpine-tundra in Vermont.
Cornwall Marsh		1973	43.915926°N 73.186342°W	Addison	mixed- state, municipal, private	The largest unbroken red maple swamp in Vermont.
Franklin Bog		1973		Franklin	private	A cold, northern sphagnum-heath bog.
Fisher-Scott Memorial Pines		1976		Bennington	state	An old-growth stand of white pine.
Gifford Woods		1980	43.6762°N 72.8109°W	Rutland	state	An old-growth, northern hardwood, climax forest.
Little Otter Creek Marsh		1973		Addison	mixed- state, private	Considered the best large expanse of marsh land in Vermont
Lake Willoughby Natural Area	Lake Willoughby	1967	44.751944°N 72.062778°W	Orleans	state	The deepest lake in Vermont and one of the most significant and scenic examples of glacial erosion in the northeast.
Molly Bog		1973		Lamoille	mixed- state, private	A classic, early successional, cold northern bog.
Mount Mansfield	Mount Mansfield	1980	44.543947°N 72.81431°W	Chittenden, Lamoille	state	Contains a virgin, red spruce- balsam fir forest, extensive alpine tundra, and rare arctic flora not found elsewhere in the northeast.
Chazy Fossil Reef		2009	44.8528°N 73.34°W	Grand Isle	mixed- federal, state, private	The oldest known occurrence of a biologically diverse fossil reef in the world.

== See also ==
- List of National Historic Landmarks in Vermont
