= Gifford Woods State Park =

United States historic place and State Park in Rutland County, Vermont

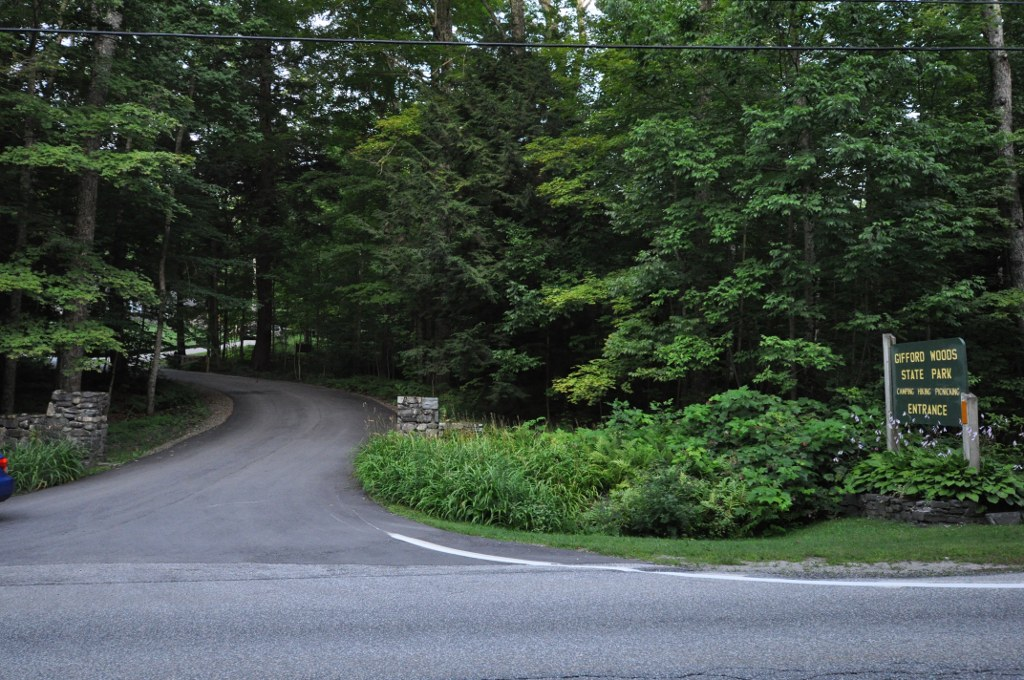
- Park entrance

- Location within Vermont
- Interactive map of Gifford Woods State Park
- Location: Killington, Vermont, United States
- Coordinates: 43°40′34″N 72°48′39″W
- Area: 285 acres (115 ha)
- Established: 1931
- Administrator: Vermont Department of Forests, Parks, and Recreation
- Open: Mid May - Mid October
- Website: Official website
Vermont State Parks
- Gifford Woods State Park
- U.S. National Register of Historic Places
- U.S. Historic district
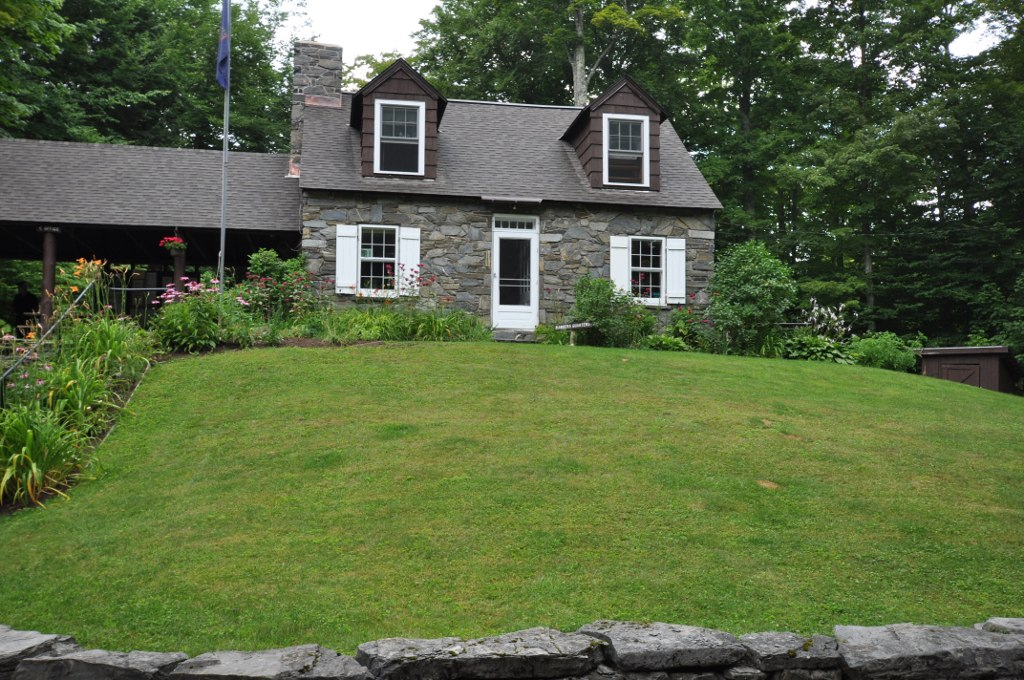
- Rangers quarters
- Location: VT 100, Killington, Vermont
- Built: 1931
- Architectural style: CCC State Park
- MPS: Historic Park Landscapes in National and State Parks MPS
- NRHP reference No.: 02000414
- Added to NRHP: April 23, 2002

Gifford Woods State Park is a state park located at the base of Pico Peak in Killington, Vermont. The wooded park provides camping, picnic, and fishing facilities, and has hiking trails, including a portion of the Appalachian Trail. It preserves an area of old-growth forest that has been designated a National Natural Landmark, and is accessible via an interpretive trail. The park was established in 1931. Part of it is listed on the National Register of Historic Places, for facilities developed by the Civilian Conservation Corps in the 1930s.

== Setting ==
Gifford Woods State Park is located on the east side of the Green Mountains, in the northern part of the town of Killington. It is bounded on the south by United States Route 4, and is bounded on the east by Vermont Route 100, except for a few acres between that road and Kent Pond to the east. The park consists of about 285 acres (115 ha) set on the northeastern slope of Pico Peak.

== History ==
The park was established in 1931 with the purchase by the state of 13 acres (5.3 ha) of land. In 1933 and 1934, a CCC crew built the main access road (including its stone gates), contact station, ranger house, picnic area, and the upper section of the campground loop. The park grew with additional land acquisitions over the years, reaching its present size of 285 acres in 2003. The campground was enlarged in 1959, after the acquisition of Kent Farm. Most of its leantos and picnic facilities date to the 1960s.

A 40-acre (16 ha) area of the park was listed on the National Register of Historic Places in 2002, for its association with the CCC, and 13 acres (5.3 ha) of old-growth forest were designated a National Natural Landmark in 1980 by the United States Department of the Interior. The Gifford Woods Natural Area (7 acres) is designated as a State Natural Area.

== Features ==
Most of the park is wooded. An access road on the east side of VT 100 provides access to a boat launch and fishing area on Kent Pond, while the main access road is located on the west side, providing access to the park's other facilities. It leads to a contact station and ranger house, built by the Civilian Conservation Corps (CCC) in the 1930s, with a parking area for day-use hikers. The road then leads past the contact station to the picnic area and campground, which offers 22 campsites, 21 leantos, and 4 rental cabins. Part of the campground loop, including one of the comfort stations, were built by the CCC in the 1930s.

North of the contact station is an interpretive hiking trail, which passes through the park's old growth forest area. The Appalachian Trail, which branches from the Long Trail on the mountain ridge above the park, runs east–west through the campground and around Kent Pond.

== See also ==
- National Register of Historic Places listings in Rutland County, Vermont
- List of National Natural Landmarks in Vermont
