= Linden Terrace =

Historic house in Vermont, United States

- U.S. National Register of Historic Places
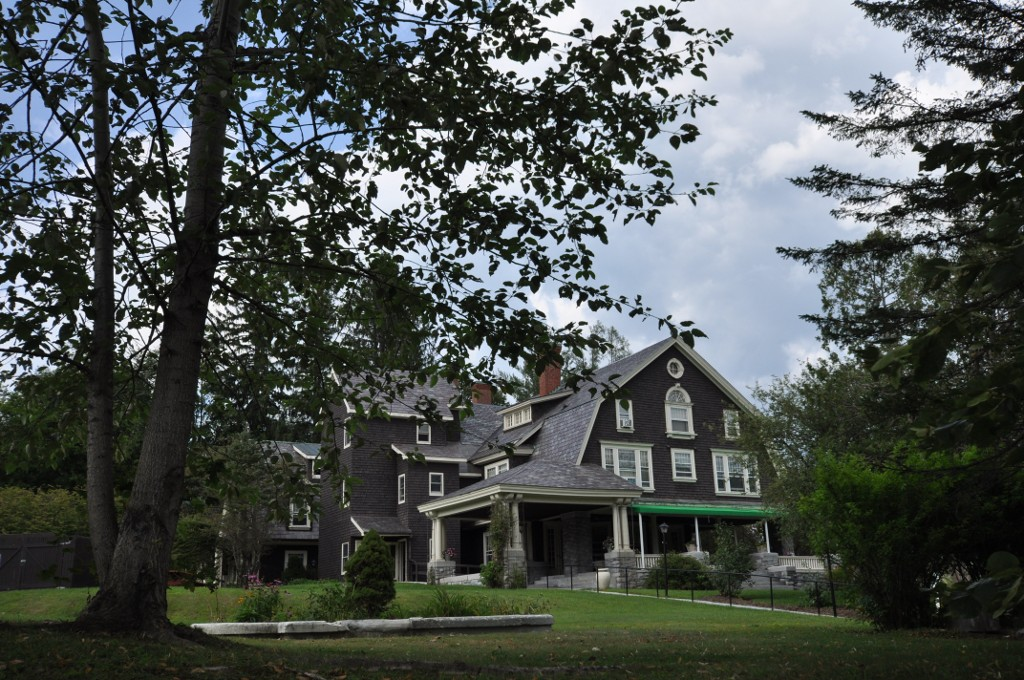

- Location within Vermont Location within the United States
- Location: 191 Grove St., Rutland, Vermont
- Coordinates: 43°37′7″N 72°59′6″W
- Area: 2 acres (0.81 ha)
- Built: 1912
- Architect: Arthur H. Smith,
- Architectural style: Shingle Style, Colonial Revival
- NRHP reference No.: 07000844
- Added to NRHP: August 23, 2007

Linden Terrace is a historic house at 191 Grove Street in Rutland, Vermont. Built in 1912 as a summer estate for a prominent businessman, it is one of the finer surviving summer houses of the period in southern Vermont. It was listed on the National Register of Historic Places in 2007. It now houses senior and assisted living apartments.

== Description and history ==
Linden Terrace is located in what is a residential area of the northwestern part of the city of Rutland. It is a rectangular/L shaped estate, bounded on the east by Grove Street, the west by Holly Street, and the south by Linden Street, where one vehicular entrance is located. The property includes a large main house, a carriage house, and a small garden house, formerly part of a greenhouse. The main house is a very large 3 story wood-frame structure, capped by a 1 1/2-story gambrel roof, with Shingle and Colonial Revival features. It has a roughly symmetrical main facade. The west side of the house has an L section on the northwest, with a variety of dormers and projecting sections, plus the porte-cochere to the southwest, and its post foundations and the skirting of the front porch are gray marble, which was also used for the foundation. The interior, despite its conversion to apartments, retains a substantial amount of original woodwork and decorative elements. The carriage house is built in a similar style to the main house.

The estate was built in 1912 for Herman W. Vaughan, director of a Boston paper company, Hollingsworth and Whitney, who had married a Rutland woman whom he met while working in Rutland in his teens. Originally intended as a summer estate, Vaughan moved here permanently in 1920, and it was his home until his death in 1950. The house is featured in what is believed to be the first feature film shot in Vermont, the 1916 A Vermont Romance. Arthur H. Smith, who designed the house, was one of Vermont's leading architects of the early 20th century.

== See also ==
- National Register of Historic Places listings in Rutland County, Vermont
