= Arthur Smith (cricketer, born 1853) =

English cricketer

Arthur Frederick Smith (13 May 1853 – 18 January 1936) was an English first-class cricketer active 1873–78 who played for Middlesex. He played in 14 first-class matches as a right-handed batsman, scoring 193 runs with a highest score of 48*.

Smith was born in Regent's Park, London, and educated at Harrow School, Wellington College and Trinity College, Cambridge, where he was awarded blues for both cricket and rugby. He moved to South Africa and worked for the mining company De Beers. He died at Kimberley, Cape Province.
