= Arthur Smith (cricketer, born 1872) =

English cricketer

Personal information
- Full name: Arthur Smith
- Born: 17 March 1872; Barlestone, Leicestershire, England
- Died: 3 October 1952 (aged 80); Melton Mowbray, Leicestershire, England
- Batting: Right-handed
- Bowling: Right-arm fast

Domestic team information
- Years: Team
- 1890: Leicestershire

Career statistics
Competition	First-class
Matches	4
Runs scored	16
Batting average	2.66
100s/50s	–/–
Top score	9
Balls bowled	313
Wickets	5
Bowling average	27.00
5 wickets in innings	–
10 wickets in match	–
Best bowling	3/40
Catches/stumpings	–/–
- Source: Cricinfo, 28 February 2012

Arthur Smith (17 March 1872 – 3 October 1952) was an English cricketer. Smith was a right-handed batsman who bowled right-arm fast. He was born at Barlestone, Leicestershire.

Smith made his first-class debut for Leicestershire against Yorkshire at Headingley in the 1897 County Championship. He made two further first-class appearances in that season against Lancashire and the Marylebone Cricket Club, while his fourth and final first-class appearance came in the 1901 County Championship against Derbyshire. Smith's main role was as a bowler, in his four first-class matches he took 5 wickets at an expensive average of 27.00, with best figures of 3/40. With the bat, he scored 16 runs at a batting average of 2.66, with a high score of 9.

He died at Melton Mowbray, Leicestershire, on 3 October 1952.
