= Vergennes Historic District =

Historic district in Vermont, United States

- U.S. National Register of Historic Places
- U.S. Historic district
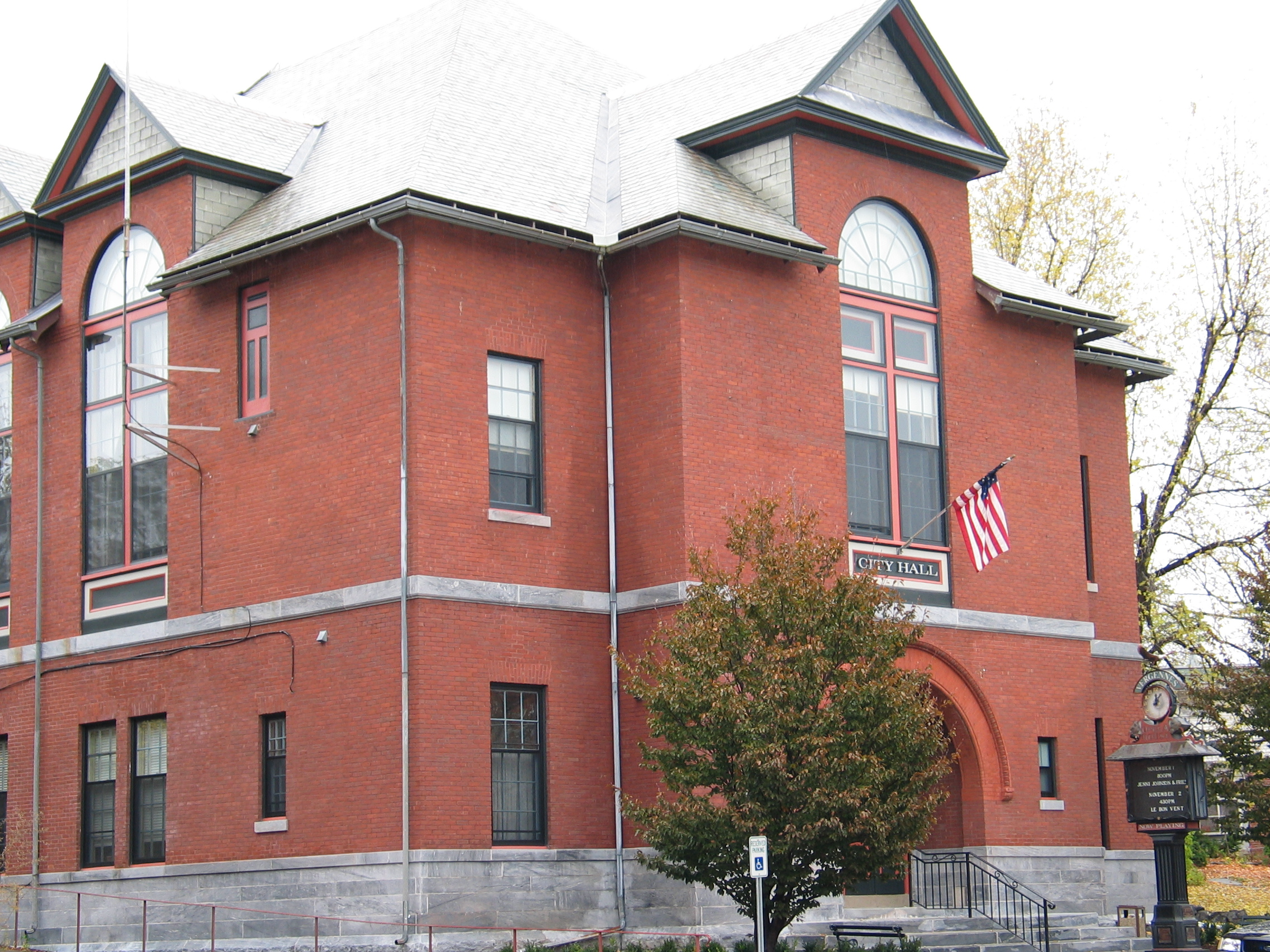
- Town hall

- Location within Vermont Location within the United States
- Location: Vergennes, Vermont
- Coordinates: 44°10′7″N 73°15′15″W
- Area: 84 acres (34 ha)
- Built: 1788
- Architectural style: Greek Revival, Late Victorian
- NRHP reference No.: 76000136
- Added to NRHP: September 3, 1976

The Vergennes Historic District encompasses the historic commercial and industrial heart of the city of Vergennes, Vermont. Incorporated in 1788, the city developed as a major industrial center, and served as a military center during the War of 1812. The district includes mainly 19th and early-20th century commercial, retail, residential and civic properties, as well as the former site of the Monkton Iron Works, once one of the nation's largest iron foundries. The district was listed on the National Register of Historic Places in 1976.

== Description and history ==
The city of Vergennes was first settled in the 1760s, but only began significant growth in the 1780s, when it became one of Vermont's early industrial centers. The city is located at a bend in Otter Creek where there is a 37-foot (11 m) falls that could be harnessed for water power, and it also benefited by its location as the crossing point of two major stagecoach routes. It was incorporated as a city in 1788. Sawmills, gristmills, and later other types of industry were all powered by the waters of the creek, and the city experienced growth through the 19th century. One of the major businesses, founded in 1807, was the Monkton Iron Works, which became one of the nation's largest early 19th-century iron foundries. It became a critical factor in the War of 1812, when Vergennes, with ready access to Lake Champlain via Otter Creek, served as a military base. The ironworks and the Macdonough Shipyard both played key roles in the eventual United States victory at the 1814 Battle of Plattsburgh.

The historic district extends primarily along Main Street (now Vermont Route 22A) between Mechanic Street and Monkton Road. It extends northward along both sides of Otter Creek, in order to include the now largely archaeological remnants of the iron works and shipyard. The blocks of Main Street just east of the creek are primarily commercial and civic in character, with 19th and early 20th-century commercial buildings, while it becomes more residential further east. Civic buildings include Vergennes City Hall and the public library.

== See also ==
- Vergennes Residential Historic District
- National Register of Historic Places listings in Addison County, Vermont
