= Arthur Smith (footballer, born 1879) =

Australian rules footballer

Personal information
- Full name: Arthur Digby Smith
- Born: 16 November 1879; Bairnsdale, Victoria
- Died: 28 October 1963 (aged 83); Caulfield, Victoria
- Original team: Bairnsdale

Playing career^{1}
Years	Club	Games (Goals)
1901	South Melbourne	9 (0)
- ^{1} Playing statistics correct to the end of 1901.

Arthur Digby Smith (16 November 1879 – 28 October 1963) was an Australian rules footballer who played for the South Melbourne Football Club in the Victorian Football League (VFL).

== Family ==
The son of John Digby Smith (1829–1916), and Ann Eliza Smith (-1915), née Gibson, Arthur Digby Smith was born at Bairnsdale, Victoria on 16 November 1879.

He married Katherine Hooper (1892–1929) on 29 October 1914.

== Football ==
He played his first senior game for South Melbourne against St Kilda on 4 May 1901.

== Death ==
He died at a private hospital in Caulfield, Victoria on 28 October 1963.
