= Arthur Smith (rugby league) =

English rugby league footballer

Personal information
- Full name: Arthur Smith
- Born: Cumberland, England

Playing information
- Position: Centre
Club
Years	Team	Pld	T	G	FG	P
1923–24	Warrington	7	0	0	0	0
- As of 12 December 2016

Arthur Smith was an English professional rugby league footballer who played in the 1920s. He played at club level for Warrington, as a centre.

== Playing career ==
=== Club career ===
Arthur Smith made his début for Warrington in the 0-35 defeat by Barrow at Craven Park, Barrow on Saturday 24 November 1923, and he played his last match for Warrington on Saturday 12 January 1924.
