= Arthur Hall Smith =

American painter

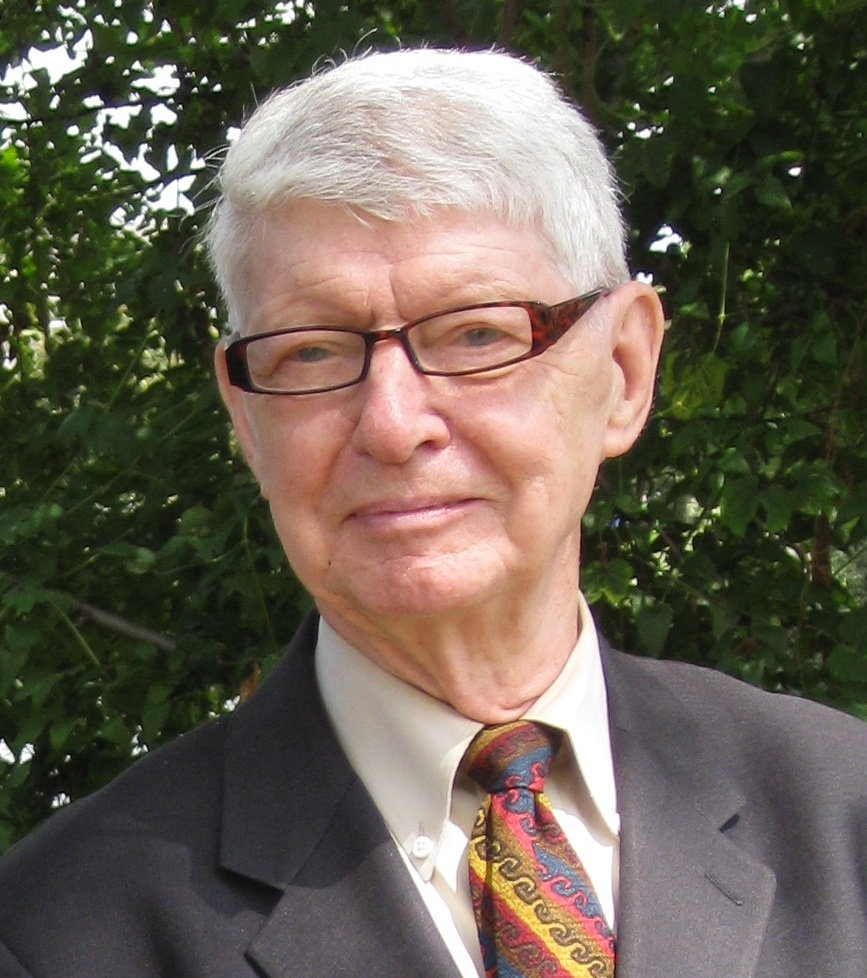
- Smith in 2009
- Born: March 23, 1929; Norfolk, Virginia
- Died: February 20, 2013 (aged 83); Paris, France
- Education: Illinois Wesleyan, École nationale supérieure des Beaux-Arts, École du Louvre, Institute d'Art et Archeologie, University of Washington, The George Washington University - MFA, and private studies with Stanley William Hayter and Mark Tobey
- Known for: Painting

Arthur Hall Smith (23 March 1929 – 20 February 2013) was an American painter.

== Biography ==
Smith grew up in Norfolk, Virginia where he received his first drawing instruction at an early age from his father, who was a naval architect. He studied at Illinois Wesleyan University, where he obtained a BFA. He received a Fulbright Fellowship upon graduation and went to Paris to study at the Ecole des Beaux-Arts, École du Louvre, and the Institute d'Art et Archeologie. While in Paris, he also studied privately with Stanley William Hayter. He did graduate study at the University of Washington and also privately studied with Mark Tobey. Some of his commissions include the Centennial Murals at the Memorial Center at Illinois Wesleyan University and the Mural of Mammals in World Art in the Mammal Hall of the National Museum of Natural History. He served in Korea and later took a teaching post at The George Washington University. In 1961, he had a ten-year retrospective at the Corcoran Gallery of Art.
