= National Natural Landmark =

Natural areas program in the United States

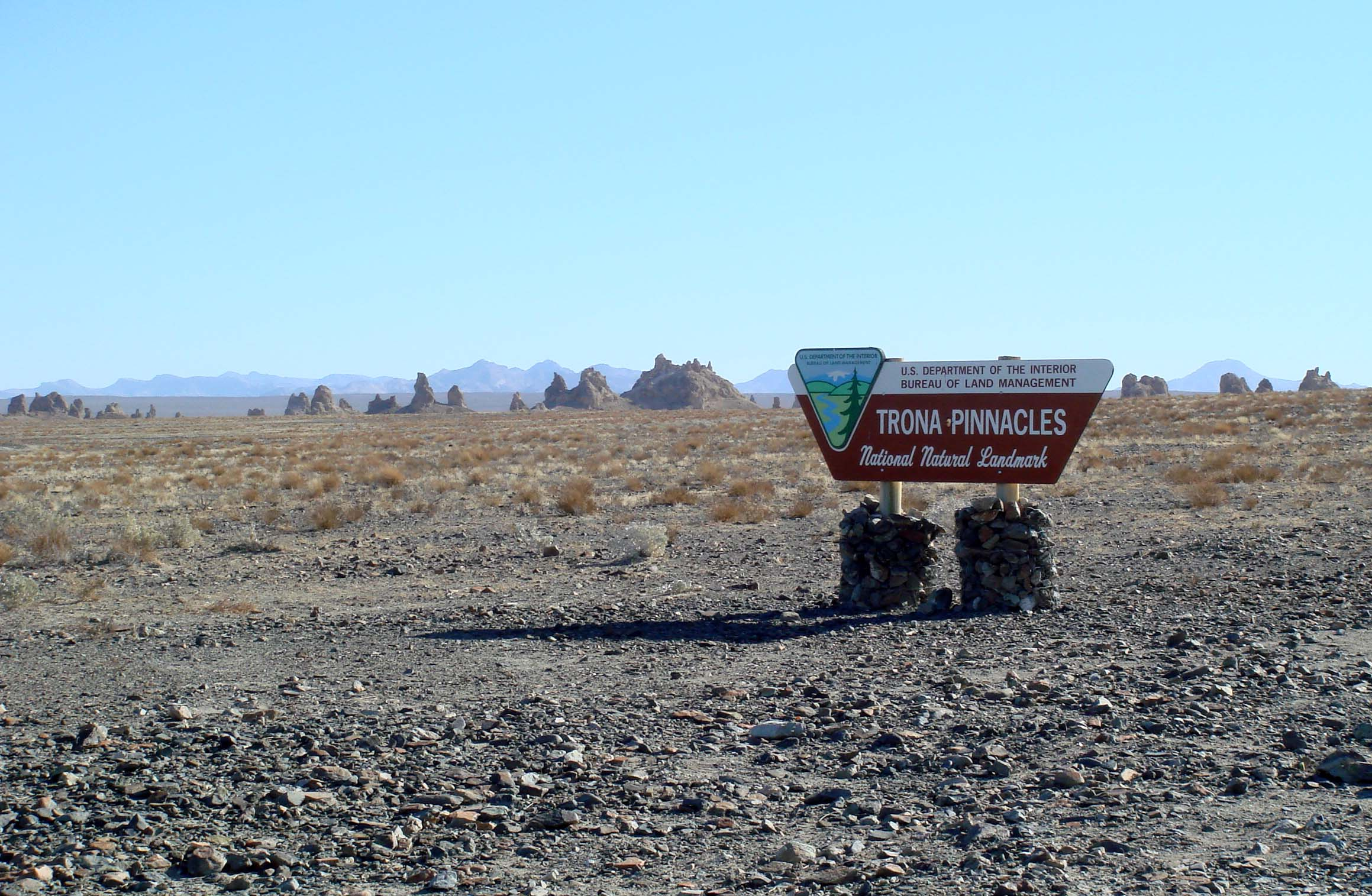
The Trona Pinnacles with National Natural Landmark sign

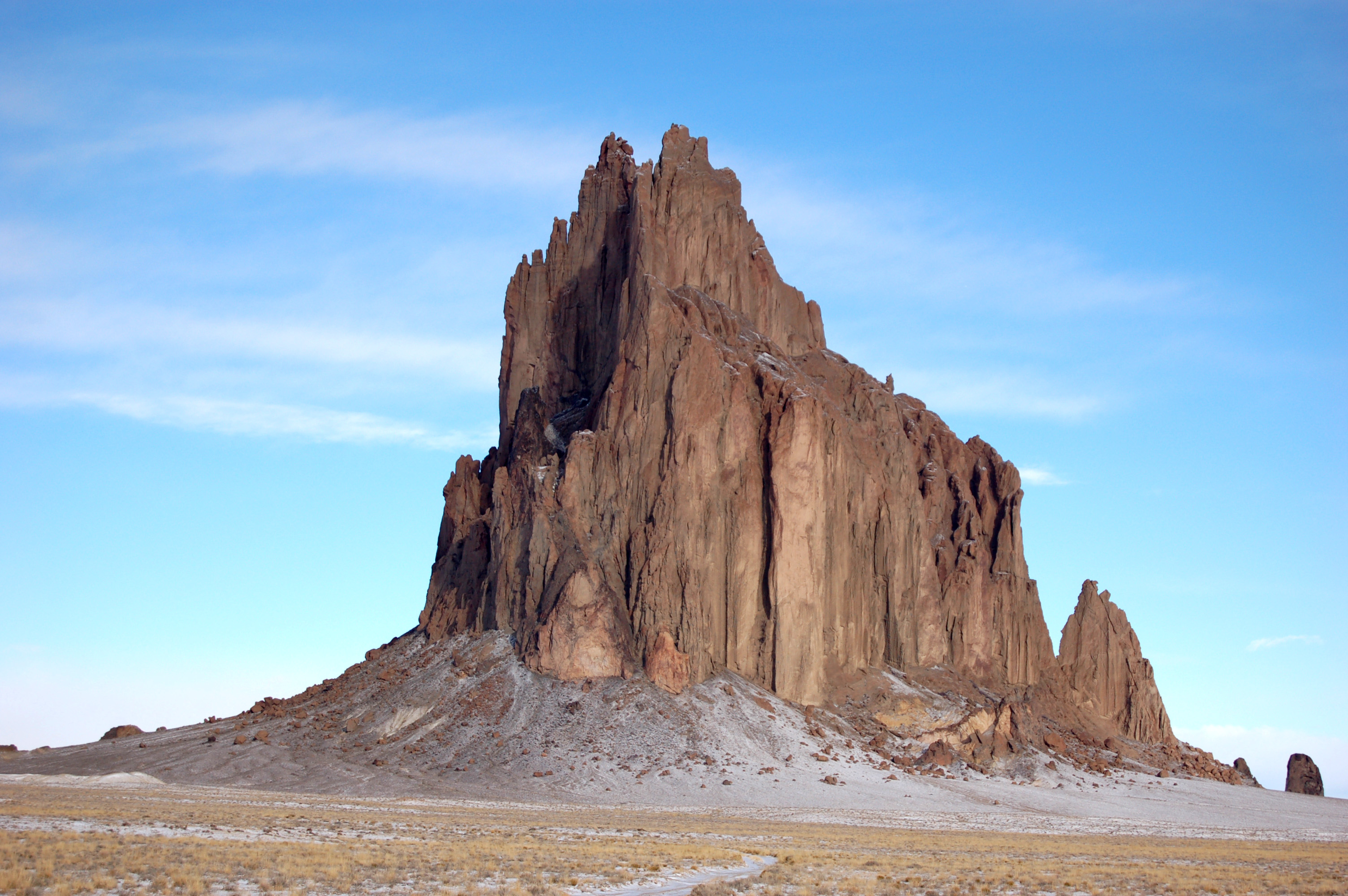
Shiprock National Natural Landmark

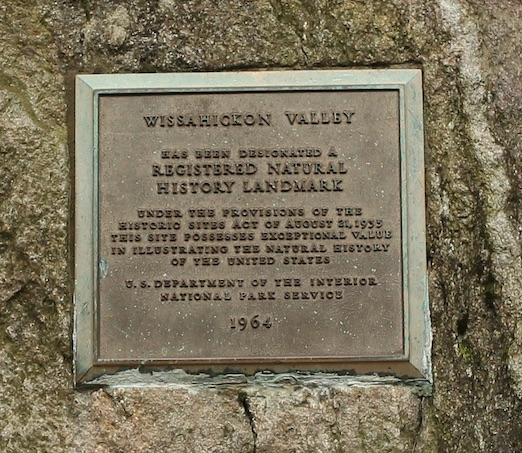
Wissahickon Valley plaque in Philadelphia near Valley Green Inn

The National Natural Landmarks (NNL) Program in the United States recognizes and encourages the conservation of outstanding examples of the natural history of the country. It is the only national natural areas program that identifies and recognizes the best examples of biological and geological features in both public and private ownership. The program was established on May 18, 1962, by United States Secretary of the Interior Stewart Udall.

The program aims to encourage and support voluntary preservation of sites that illustrate the geological and ecological history of the United States. It also hopes to strengthen the public's appreciation of the country's natural heritage. As of July 2024, 605 sites have been added to the National Registry of Natural Landmarks. The registry includes nationally significant geological and ecological features in 48 states, American Samoa, Guam, Puerto Rico, and the U.S. Virgin Islands.

The National Park Service administers the NNL Program and, if requested, assists NNL owners and managers with the conservation of these sites. Land acquisition by the federal government is not a goal of the program. National Natural Landmarks are nationally significant sites owned by a variety of land stewards, and their participation in this federal program is voluntary.

The legislative authority for the National Natural Landmarks Program stems from the Historic Sites Act of August 21, 1935 (49 Stat. 666, 16 U.S.C. 641); the program is governed by federal regulations. The NNL Program does not have the protection features of Section 106 of the National Historic Preservation Act of 1966. Thus, the designation of a National Natural Landmark constitutes only an agreement with the owner to preserve, as far as possible, the significant natural values of the site or area. Administration and preservation of National Natural Landmarks is solely the owner's responsibility. Either party may terminate the agreement after they notify the other.

== Designation ==
The NNL designation is made by the Secretary of the Interior after an in-depth scientific study of a potential site. All new designations must have owner concurrence. The selection process is rigorous: to be considered for NNL status, a site must be one of the best examples of a natural region's characteristic biotic or geologic features. Since the establishment of the NNL program, a multi-step process has been used to designate a site for NNL status. Since 1970, the following steps have constituted the process.

1. A natural area inventory of a natural region is completed to identify the most promising sites.
2. After landowners are notified that the site is being considered for NNL status, a detailed onsite evaluation is conducted by scientists other than those who conducted the inventory. (Note: This step was dropped after 1979 but was reinstituted in 1999.)
3. The evaluation report is peer-reviewed by other experts to assure its soundness.
4. The report is reviewed further by National Park Service staff.
5. The site is reviewed by the Secretary of the Interior's National Park Advisory Board to determine that the site qualifies as an NNL.
6. The findings are provided to the Secretary of the Interior who approves or declines.
7. Landowners are notified a third time informing them that the site has been designated an NNL.

Prospective sites for NNL designation are terrestrial and aquatic ecosystems; geological features, exposures, and landforms that record active geological processes or portions of earth history; and fossil evidence of biological evolution. Each major natural history "theme" can be further subdivided into various sub-themes. For example, sub-themes suggested in 1972 for the overall theme "Lakes and ponds" included large deep lakes, large shallow lakes, lakes of complex shape, crater lakes, kettle lake and potholes, oxbow lakes, dune lakes, sphagnum-bog lakes, lakes fed by thermal streams, tundra lakes and ponds, swamps and marshy areas, sinkhole lakes, unusually productive lakes, and lakes of high productivity and high clarity.

== Ownership ==
The NNL program does not require designated properties to be owned by public entities. Lands under almost all forms of ownership or administration have been designated—federal, state, local, municipal, and private. Federal lands with NNLs include those administered by the National Park Service, U.S. Forest Service, Bureau of Land Management, Bureau of Reclamation, Fish and Wildlife Service, Air Force, Marine Corps, Army Corps of Engineers, Navy, and others.

Some NNLs has been designated on lands held by Native Americans or tribes. NNLs also have been designated on state lands that cover a variety of types and management, such as forest, park, game refuge, recreation area, and preserve. Private lands with NNLs include those owned by universities, museums, scientific societies, conservation organizations, land trusts, commercial interests, and private individuals. Approximately 52% of NNLs are administered by public agencies, more than 30% are entirely privately owned, and the remaining 18% are owned or administered by a mixture of public agencies and private owners.

== Access ==
Participation in the NNL Program carries no requirements regarding public access. The NNL registry includes many sites of national significance that are open for public tours, but others are not. Since many NNLs are located on federal and state property, permission to visit is often unnecessary. Some private properties may be open to public visitation or just require permission from the site manager. On the other hand, some NNL private landowners desire no visitors whatsoever and might even prosecute trespassers. The reasons for this viewpoint vary: potential property damage or liability, fragile or dangerous resources, and desire for solitude or no publicity.

== Property status ==
NNL designation is an agreement between the property owner and the federal government. NNL designation does not change ownership of the property nor induce any encumbrances on the property. NNL status does not transfer with changes in ownership.

Participation in the NNL Program involves a voluntary commitment on the part of the landowner(s) to retain the integrity of their NNL property as it was when designated. If "major" habitat or landscape destruction is planned, participation in the NNL Program by a landowner would be disingenuous and meaningless.

The federal action of designation imposes no new land use restrictions that were not in effect before the designation. It is conceivable that state or local governments of their own volition could initiate regulations or zoning that might apply to an NNL. However, as of 2005 no examples of such a situation have been identified. Some states require planners to ascertain the location of NNLs.

== List of landmarks ==
Listed by state or territory in alphabetical order. As of July 2024, there were 605 listings. (Note: The links connected with the state name go to that state's site list.)

State or territory	Number of landmarks	Number, non-duplicated	Earliest declared	Latest declared	Image
Alabama	7	7	October 1971	November 1987	
Alaska	16	16	1967	1976	
American Samoa	7	7	1972	1972	
Arizona	10	10	1965	2011	
Arkansas	5	5	1972	1976	
California	37	37	1964	January 2021	
Colorado	17	16 (Note: Sand Creek shared between Colorado and Wyoming)	1964	2023	
Connecticut	8	7 (Note: Bartholomew's Cobble shared between Connecticut and Massachusetts)	April 1968	November 1973	
Delaware	0				
Florida	18	18	March 1964	May 1987	
Georgia	11	11	1966	April 2013	
Guam	4	4	1972	1972	
Hawaii	7	7	June 1971	December 1972	
Idaho	11	11	1968	1980	
Illinois	18	18	1965	1987	
Indiana	30	29 (Note: Ohio Coral Reef shared between Indiana and Kentucky)	1965	1986	
Iowa	7	7	1965	1987	
Kansas	5	5	1968	1980	
Kentucky	7	6	1966	2009	
Louisiana	0				
Maine	14	14	1966	1984	
Maryland	6	5 (Note: Cranesville Swamp Nature Sanctuary shared between Maryland and West Virginia)	1964	1980	
Massachusetts	12	11	October 1971	December 2024	
Michigan	12	12	1967	1984	
Minnesota	8	7 (Note: Ancient River Warren Channel shared between Minnesota and South Dakota)	1965	1980	
Mississippi	5	5	1965	1976	
Missouri	16	16	June 1971	May 1986	
Montana	10	10	1966	1980	
Nebraska	5	5	1964	2006	
Nevada	6	6	1968	1973	
New Hampshire	11	11	1971	1987	
New Jersey	11	10 (Note: Palisades of the Hudson shared between New Jersey and New York)	October 1965	June 1983	
New Mexico	12	12	1969	1982	
New York	29	27 (Note: Chazy Fossil Reef shared between Vermont and New York)	March 1964	2023	
North Carolina	13	13	1967	1983	
North Dakota	4	4	1960	1975	
Northern Mariana Islands	0				
Ohio	23	23	1965	1980	
Oklahoma	3	3	December 1974	June 1983	
Oregon	11	11	1966	June 2016	
Pennsylvania	27	27	March 1964	January 2009	
Puerto Rico	5	5	1975	1980	
Rhode Island	1	1	May 1974	May 1974	
South Carolina	6	6	May 1974	May 1986	
South Dakota	13	12	1965	1980	
Tennessee	13	13	1966	1974	
Texas	21	21	1965	July 2024	
Utah	4	4	October 1965	1977	
Vermont	12	11	1967	2009	
Virgin Islands	7	7	1980	1980	
Virginia	10	10	1965	1987	
Washington	18	18	1965	2011	
Washington D.C.	0				
West Virginia	16	15	1964	2021	
Wisconsin	18	18	1964	May 2012	
Wyoming	6	5	October 1965	December 1984	

== See also ==
- National Historic Landmark
