= Historic Sites Act =

The Historic Sites Act of 1935 was enacted by the United States Congress largely to organize the myriad federally owned parks, monuments, and historic sites under the National Park Service and the United States Secretary of the Interior. However, it is also significant in that it declared for the first time "...that it is a national policy to preserve for public use historic sites, buildings, and objects of national significance...". Thus it is the first assertion of historic preservation as a government duty, which was only hinted at in the 1906 Antiquities Act.

Section 462 of the act enumerates a wide range of powers and responsibilities given to the National Park Service and the Secretary of the Interior, including:

- codification and institutionalization of the temporary Historic American Buildings Survey
- authorization to survey and note significant sites and buildings (this became National Historic Landmark program, which was integrated into the National Register after the 1966 National Historic Preservation Act)
- authorization to actually perform preservation work

Section 463 established the National Park System Advisory Board to assist the Secretary of the Interior with administration.
