= Killington =

There are 2 places named Killington in England, and 1 in the US.

- Killington, Cumbria, a village and civil parish in Cumbria, England
  - Killington Beck, the location of Killington Lake (or Killington Reservoir) in Cumbria
  - Killington Lake services, a service area on the M6 motorway in England
- Killington, Devon, a hamlet in Devon, England
- Killington, Vermont, a town in Rutland County, Vermont, USA
  - Killington Peak, a mountain in Killington, Vermont
  - Killington Ski Resort, a ski resort on Killington Peak

Other uses:

- Dylan Killington, a fictional character on the American television series Studio 60 on the Sunset Strip
