= Sherburne Pass =

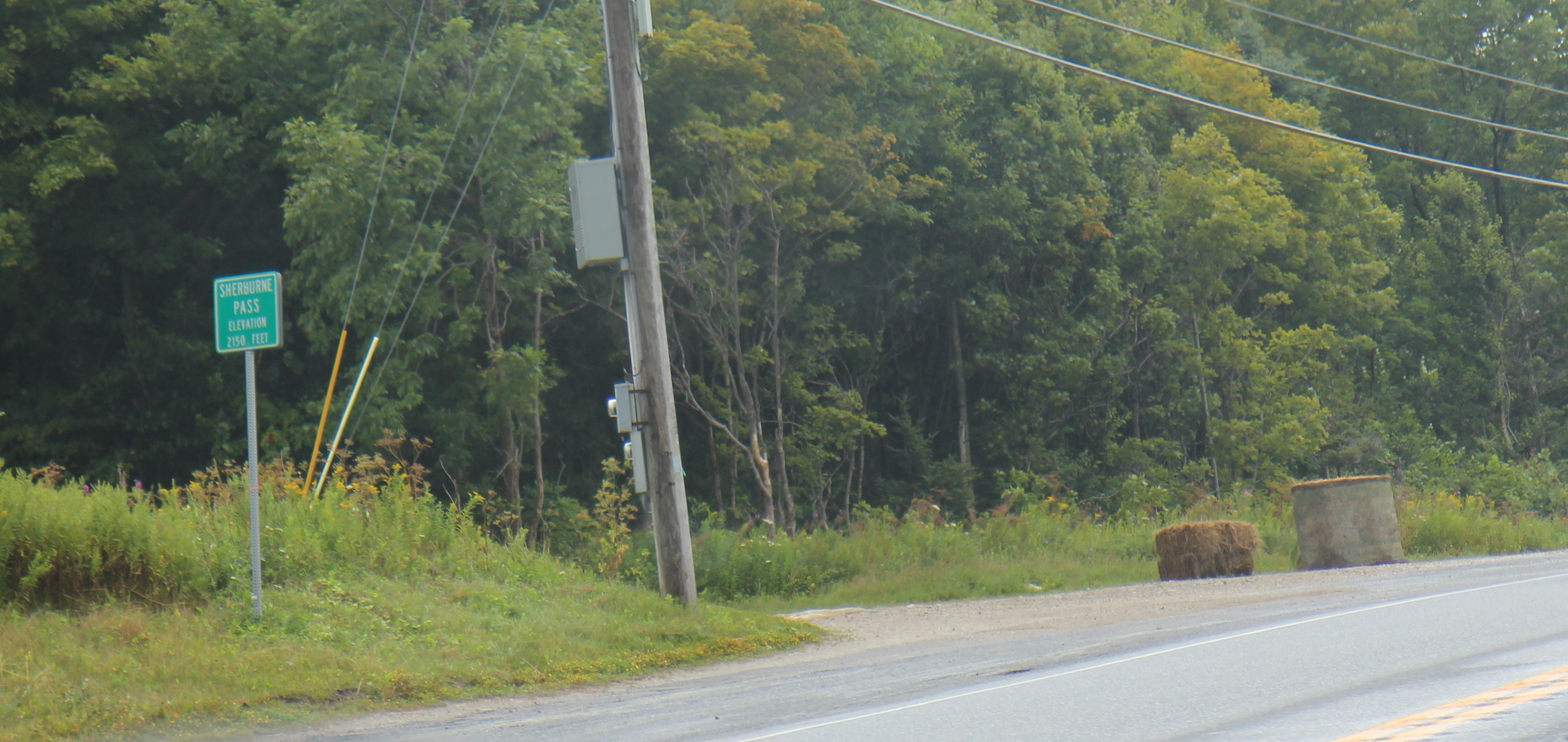
- Sherburne Pass on U.S. Route 4
- Interactive map of Sherburne Pass
- Elevation: 2,150 feet (660 m)
- Traversed by: U.S. Route 4

Third Approach
- Location: Killington, Rutland County, Vermont, United States
- Range: Green Mountains
- Coordinates: 43°39.82′N 72°49.98′W
- Topo map: USGS Pico Peak

Sherburne Pass, is a mountain pass in the Green Mountains of Vermont, between 3,957-foot (1,206 m) Pico Peak to the south and 2,782-foot (848 m) Deer Leap Mountain to the north. The height of land of the pass is located in the town of Killington, while its western ascent begins in the town of Mendon.

On the east side, the pass drains into Kent Brook, thence into the Ottauquechee River, the Connecticut River, and into Long Island Sound in Connecticut. To the west, the pass drains via Mendon Brook, then East Creek, into Otter Creek, thence into Lake Champlain. Lake Champlain drains into the Richelieu River in Québec, thence into the Saint Lawrence River, and into the Gulf of Saint Lawrence.

Pico Mountain, part of Killington Ski Resort since December 1997, is on the south side of Sherburne Pass, with a ski lifts running from Rte. 4 to the summit of Pico Peak.

The Long Trail (LT), a 272-mile (438 km) hiking trail, runs the length of Vermont from Massachusetts to Québec along the spine of the Green Mountains, crossing U.S. Route 4 about half a mile west of the height of Sherburne Pass. The Appalachian Trail (AT), a 2,170-mile (3,490 km) National Scenic Trail from Georgia to Maine, coincides with the LT south of the pass. The AT diverges from the LT about a mile north of Rt. 4 at Maine Junction — northwest of Deer Leap Mtn. in Willard Gap — and runs east to New Hampshire and the White Mountains. The AT and LT formerly crossed Rt. 4 at the height of Sherburne Pass, and split on the east side of Deer Leap Mountain. Until 1999, the trails passed 0.3 mi (0.5 km) east of the summit of Pico Peak, along the 3,500-foot (1,100 m) contour. Both were moved to the west slope of the mountain. The old route of the AT/LT is now a blue-blazed trail, named the Sherburne Pass Trail.
