= Lift accessed mountain biking =

Summer activity in ski areas

Lift accessed mountain biking or Mountain bike park is a summer activity that is spreading all over the world. Using the chairlifts or gondola lifts at a ski area, mountain bikers can get up to higher altitudes quickly. The bikers don't have to ride up, and the ski area operators can keep the hill more profitable during the summer. Most bike parks have a mix of dirtjumping, downhill, enduro and freeride terrain on the trails.

Many ski resorts have embraced the sport, opening the chairlifts and building trails to rider in the summer. Lift-accessed bike parks are good because they offer the chance to make many more runs down a mountain than could be done without use of a lift.

== Canada ==
- Whistler-Blackcomb- Whistler, British Columbia
- Sun Peaks Resort- Kamloops, British Columbia
- Panorama Mountain Village- Invermere, British Columbia
- Fernie Alpine Resort- Fernie, British Columbia
- Kicking Horse Mountain Resort- Golden, British Columbia
- Mount Washington Alpine Resort- Comox, British Columbia (closed MTB operations down in 2013)
- Silver Star Mountain Resort- Vernon, British Columbia
- Blue Mountain- Collingwood, Ontario (closed MTB operations down in 2020)
- Horseshoe Resort- Horseshoe Valley, Ontario
- Mont Tremblant- Mont Tremblant, Quebec
- Mont Sainte-Anne- Quebec
- Mont Brome- Bromont, Quebec
- Mont Sutton- Sutton, Quebec
- Camp Fortune- Chelsea, Quebec
- Canada Olympic Park- Calgary, Alberta
- Rabbit Hill-Edmonton, Alberta (closed summer operations down in 2011)
- Sugarloaf Provincial Park- Campbellton, New Brunswick

== France ==
- Tignes, Savoie department
- Lac Blanc (Vosges), Alsace

== Finland ==
- Levi
- Sappeen hiihtokeskus
- Kalpalinna
- Vuokatti

== Italy ==
- Mottolino Fun Mountain, Livigno

== Norway ==
- Hafjell

== Romania ==
- Bușteni
- Sinaia
- Azuga

== United States ==
- Mammoth Mountain Ski Area- Mammoth Lakes, California
- Northstar at Tahoe- Truckee, California
- Kirkwood Mountain Resort- Kirkwood, California
- Angel Fire Resort- New Mexico
- Mount Hood Skibowl- Government Camp, Oregon
- Brian Head Resort- Parowan, Utah
- Snowbasin- Ogden, Utah
- Snowbird-Salt Lake City, Utah
- Solitude Mountain Resort-Salt Lake City, Utah
- Sugarloaf Mountain-Carrabassett Valley, Maine
- Sundance-Provo, Utah
- Park City Mountain Resort- Park City, Utah
- Deer Valley Resort-Park City, Utah
- The Canyons-Park City, Utah
- Plattekill Mountain- Roxbury, New York
- Vail Mountain- Vail, Colorado
- Killington Ski Resort- Killington, Vermont
- Waterville Valley Resort- Waterville Valley, New Hampshire
- Marquette Mountain- Marquette, Michigan
- Bryce Resort- Virginia
- Attitash Bear Peak-Bartlett, New Hampshire
- Whitefish Mountain Resort-Whitefish, Montana
- Keystone Resort-Dillon, Colorado
- Sunrise Park Resort-Greer, Arizona
- Seven Springs Mountain Resort-Champion, Pennsylvania
- Sunday River-Maine
- Alyeska Resort-Girdwood, Alaska
- Stevens Pass-Skykomish, Washington
- Pajarito-Los Alamos, New Mexico
- Blue Mountain-Palmerton, Pennsylvania
- Mount Snow-West Dover, Vermont
- Greek Peak Mountain Resort-Virgil, New York

== Scotland ==
- Nevis Range, Fort William
- Glencoe Mountain, Argyll
