= Powdr =

American Mountain Resort Company

POWDR
- Type: Private
- Founded: 1994
- Founder: John Cumming
- Headquarters: Park City, Utah
- Key people: Justin Sibley, CEO
- Website: www.powdr.com

Powdr, stylized as POWDR, is an American privately held company that owns and operates ski resorts in the United States. It is headquartered in Park City, Utah, and was founded in 1994 by John Cumming, an early investor in the clothing company Mountain Hardwear with his father Ian.

== History ==
Powdr was founded by John Cumming in 1994 with the purchase of the Park City Mountain Resort in Park City, Utah, about 30 miles outside of Salt Lake City. Later that year, the company bought the Alpine Meadows ski resort near Lake Tahoe, California. In August 1995, the company bought the Boreal Mountain Resort near Lake Tahoe and the Soda Springs ski area near the Donner Summit by Soda Springs, Nevada County, California. In April 2001, Powdr bought the Mount Bachelor ski area in Central Oregon. The company bought Las Vegas Ski and Snowboard Resort in November 2003. Powdr bought the Killington and the Pico Mountain ski resorts near Killington, Vermont, from American Skiing Company in May 2007, and in December 2019 Powdr purchased Silver Star Mountain Resort, its first mountain resort in Canada.

In July 2007, Powdr sold Alpine Meadows to JMA Ventures.

In 2008, Powdr bought the Outside TV media venture, which it later sold in 2021 to Pocket Outdoor Media, which simultaneously renamed itself to Outside.

Powdr bought Copper Mountain in Colorado in December 2009 from Intrawest. Powdr bought "World of Adventure Sports Presented by GoPro", an Emmy Award-winning TV series on December 3, 2013.

In July 2011, Powdr bought a majority share of Camp Woodward, an operator of youth summer camps established in 1970. As of 2022, Camp Woodward destinations include Woodward Mt. Bachelor, Woodward Tahoe, Woodward West, Woodward Park City, Woodward Copper, Woodward Eldora, Woodward Pennsylvania and Woodward Killington. Woodward Sydney was planned to open in 2024 but had not yet opened as of mid-2025.

In June 2016, Powdr bought the 55-year-old Eldora Mountain Resort near Boulder, Colorado.

In December 2019, Powdr opened Woodward Park City youth sports complex.

In 2023, Powdr was awarded the contract for Stovepipe Wells Village near the entrance of Death Valley National Park.

In August 2024, Powdr announced it would sell Killington and Pico Mountain ski resorts in Vermont, Eldora in Colorado, Mt. Bachelor in Oregon and SilverStar in British Columbia. It later announced the retain of Mount Bachelor.

== Lawsuits ==
=== Non-honoring of certain passes issued by prior Killington owner ===
In July 2010, a federal judge dismissed a class action lawsuit against Killington Resort over so-called 'lifetime' ski passes. Judge Christina Reiss found that the resort's current owner (Powdr) was under no legal obligation to honor previously issued investor season passes when it purchased Killington Resort in 2007.

=== Loss of Park City lease ===
When Park City Mountain Resort, a Powdr resort, mistakenly failed to renew a "sweetheart lease" for a portion of its ski terrain acreage, the company was eventually evicted from the property and, after a protracted legal fight, "reluctantly" sold its remaining area assets to Vail Resorts for approximately 180 million dollars in late 2014.

== Properties ==
=== Ski resorts ===
==== Western United States ====
- California
  - Boreal Mountain Resort
  - Soda Springs
- Colorado
  - Copper Mountain
  - Eldora Mountain Resort
- Oregon
  - Mt. Bachelor
- Utah
  - Snowbird
  - Woodward Park City

=== Camp Woodward youth camp locations ===
- Bend, Oregon; Mt. Bachelor, Oregon; Tahoe, California; Southern California; Snowbird, Utah; Park City, Utah, Copper Mountain, Colorado; Eldora Mountain, Colorado, Killington Mountain, Vermont, and Woodward Pennsylvania.

=== Other operations ===
- Sun Country Tours, Oregon
- Powderbird Helicopter Skiing, Utah
- Stovepipe Wells Village, California

=== Former properties ===
==== United States ====
- Alpine Meadows, California
- Park City Mountain Resort, Utah (sale to Vail Resorts announced September 11, 2014)
- Lee Canyon, Nevada (sale to Mountain Capital Partners announced April 13, 2023)
- Killington Ski Resort, Vermont (sale to a small group of local investors led by Phill Gross announced Aug 22, 2024)
- Pico Mountain, Vermont (sale to a small group of local investors led by Phill Gross announced Aug 22, 2024)

==== Canada ====
- Silver Star Mountain Resort, Vernon, British Columbia
