= Pico Peak =

Mountain in Vermont

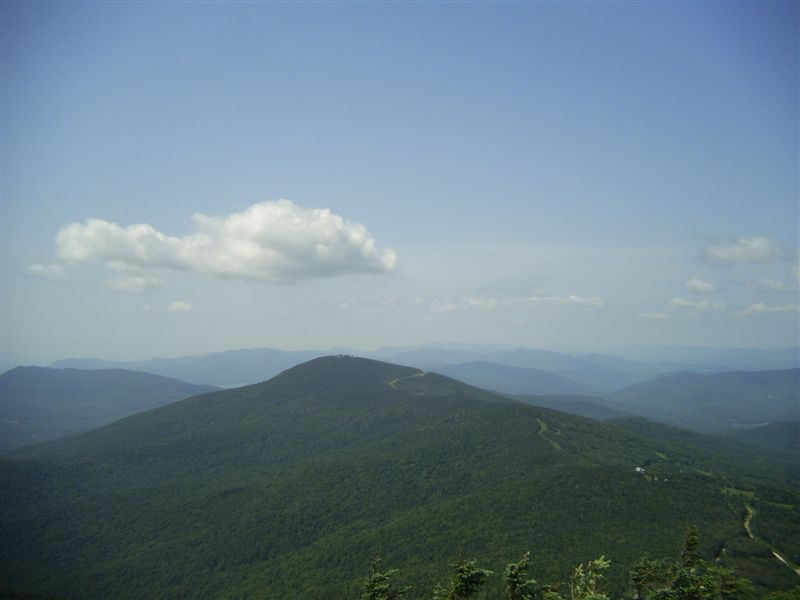
- Pico Peak seen from Killington Peak

Highest point
- Elevation: 3,967 ft (1,209 m)
- Prominence: 590 ft (180 m)
- Listing: #71 New England 100 Highest
- Coordinates: 43°38.36′N 72°50.18′W

Geography
- Location: Rutland County, Vermont
- Parent range: Coolidge Range
- Topo map: USGS Pico Peak Quad

Climbing
- Easiest route: maintained hiking trail

Pico Peak is a mountain in the Green Mountains in Rutland County, Vermont, United States. Pico Peak is flanked to the south by Ramshead Peak. To the north, it faces Deer Leap Mountain across Sherburne Pass. Seen from the pass, the summit of Pico Peak resembles a cone.

Pico Peak is the northernmost mountain of the Coolidge Range, and the second highest mountain in that range after Killington Peak. In 1927 the State Legislature named the Coolidge Range after Vermont native Calvin Coolidge. The range runs between Pico Peak and the town of Plymouth, where Coolidge grew up.

The peak's name may stem from the Abenaki for "the pass/opening" or indeed from the Spanish or Portuguese word for "peak", Pico. "Pico Peak" appears on the 1869 Beers Atlas of Rutland County, Walling's 1860 Map of the State of Vermont and Chace's 1854 Map of Rutland County (albeit reversed with Killington Peak).

The northeast side of Pico Peak drains into Kent Brook, thence into the Ottauquechee River, the Connecticut River, and into Long Island Sound in Connecticut. The southeast side of Pico drains into Roaring Brook, and thence into the Ottauquechee. The northwest side of Pico drains into Mendon Brook, thence into East Creek, Otter Creek, and Lake Champlain, which drains via the Saint Lawrence River into the Gulf of St. Lawrence in Quebec, Canada. The southwest side of Pico drains into Brewer's Brook, and thence into Mendon Brook.

Pico Peak and 1,000 acres (4 km^{2}) of forest were presented to Mortimer R. Proctor as a birthday present in 1910. He sold the mountain to Pico Ski Inc. in 1948. Pico Mountain ski area — part of Killington Ski Resort since December 1997 — is located on the northwest side of Pico Peak, with its base lodge on U.S. Route 4. Pico opened in 1937, and the first T-bar lift in the United States was installed there in 1940.

The Appalachian Trail (AT), a 2,170-mile (3,490 km) National Scenic Trail from Georgia to Maine, once passed 0.3 mi (0.48 km) east of the summit along the 3,500-foot (1,100 m) contour, until a 1999 re-routing. The Long Trail (LT), a 272-mile (438 km) hiking trail which runs along the ridge of the Green Mountains from Massachusetts to Quebec, which coincides with the Appalachian Trail in this area, was re-routed at the same time. Both were moved west of the mountain. The old AT/LT along here is now a blue-blazed trail, named the Sherburne Pass Trail. It had previously only been known as the Long Trail. The summit is reached by the 0.4 mi (0.64 km) Pico Link Trail, a segment of the defunct Pico Loop Trail. The AT and LT formerly split 2 miles (3 km) north of Pico, on Deer Leap Mountain. Now they diverge at Long Trail Junction (the former Maine Junction), just north of U.S. Route 4.

== See also ==
- List of mountains of Vermont
- List of New England Hundred Highest
