= Silver Star Provincial Park =

Provincial park in British Columbia, Canada

- IUCN category II (national park)
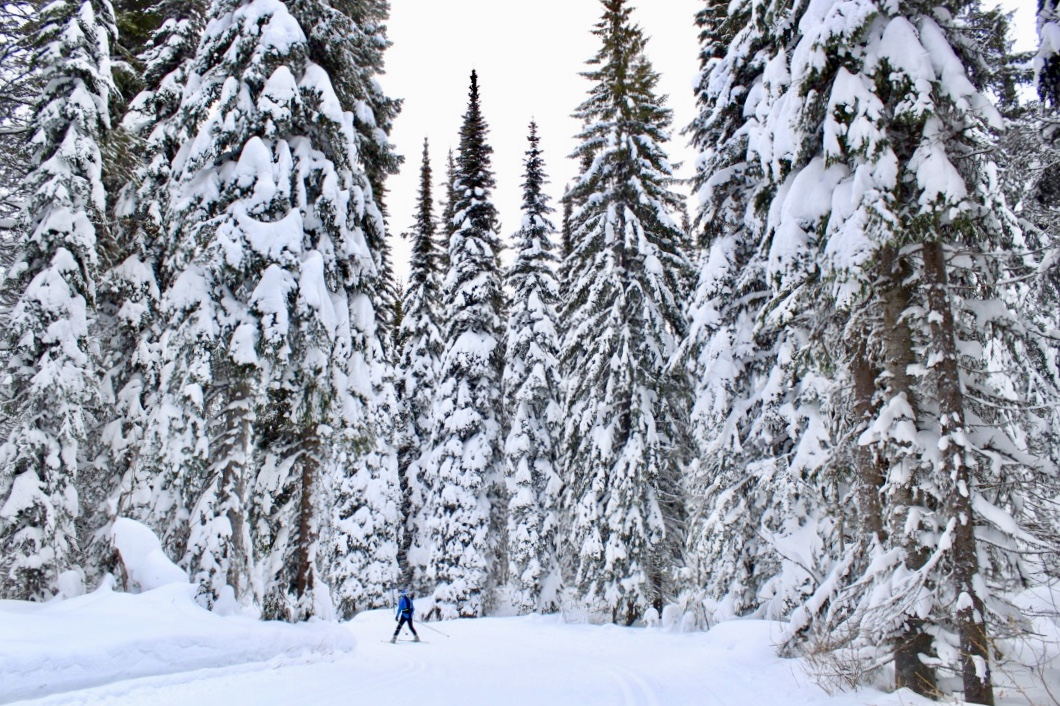
- Sovereign Lake Nordic Club in Silver Star Provincial Park

- Location within British Columbia
- Interactive map of Silver Star Provincial Park
- Location: North Okanagan, British Columbia, Canada
- Nearest city: Vernon
- Coordinates: 50°22′30″N 119°05′00″W
- Area: 5,573 ha (21.52 sq mi)
- Designation: Class C Provincial Park
- Established: March 21, 1989
- Governing body: BC Parks

Silver Star Provincial Park is a Class C provincial park in British Columbia, Canada, located northeast of the city of Vernon in the Shuswap Highland of the Monashee Mountains.

== See also ==
- Silver Star Mountain Resort
