= Boreal Mountain Resort =

Ski area in California, United States

Boreal Mountain California
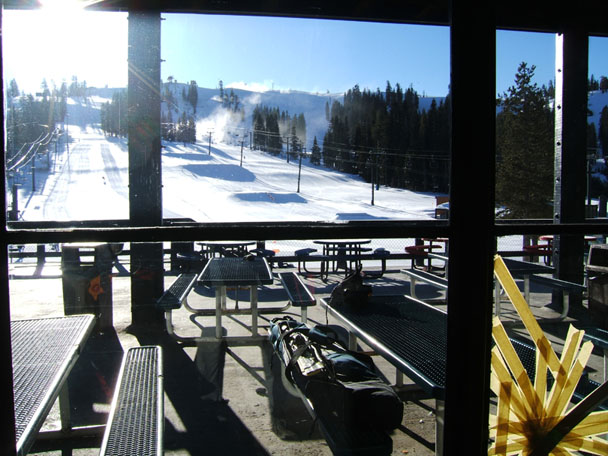
- Boreal Mountain from the lodge

- Location in California Boreal Mountain California (the United States)
- Location: Boreal Ridge
- Nearest city: Truckee, California
- Coordinates: 39.3317°N 120.3511°W
- Vertical: 500 ft (150 m)
- Top elevation: 7,700 ft (2,300 m)
- Base elevation: 7,200 ft (2,200 m)
- Skiable area: 380 acres (150 ha)
- Trails: 41 total 30% beginner 55% intermediate 15% advanced
- Longest run: 1 mi (1.6 km)
- Lift system: 8 lifts: 2 quads, 3 triples, 1 double, 2 moving carpets
- Snowfall: 400 in (1,000 cm)
- Website: www.rideboreal.com

Boreal Mountain California is a ski area in Soda Springs, near the Lake Tahoe area of California. It has six chairlifts and two surface lifts, and offers the only night skiing in Tahoe, until 8 pm. It is owned by Powdr Corporation.

Located on Interstate 80, West of Truckee, California, Boreal is typically the first area to open for skiing and snowboarding in Northern California. For the 2017-2018 season, Boreal was the first resort to open in all of California, opening on November 8, 2017. Although it is relatively small compared to other Tahoe area resorts, Boreal hosted the US Snowboarding Grand Prix in 2009.

Boreal added a new Magic Carpet for the 2007 season and a fix gripped mid-mountain quad chairlift for the 2008 season. For the 2018–19 season, Boreal opened a new fix gripped beginner quad chairlift, named California Cruiser. The Terrain park is the main feature for many "park" skiers and snowboarders. Features include handrails, boxes, a half-pipe, a jump line, snow-sculpted transition and flow lines, and the Woodward Peace Park. The family snow play area, called Tahoe Tubing features snow tubing lanes and snow play for the entire family. Tahoe Tubing is accessible from a Magic Carpet surface lift to transport guest back up the tubing lanes. Boreal Mountain is also home to Woodward Tahoe, a 33,000 square foot action sports hub open year-round. In the summer months Boreal / Woodward offers lift-served downhill mountain biking trails and an 11-acre network of outdoor skateparks, parkour zones, and dirt jump lines.

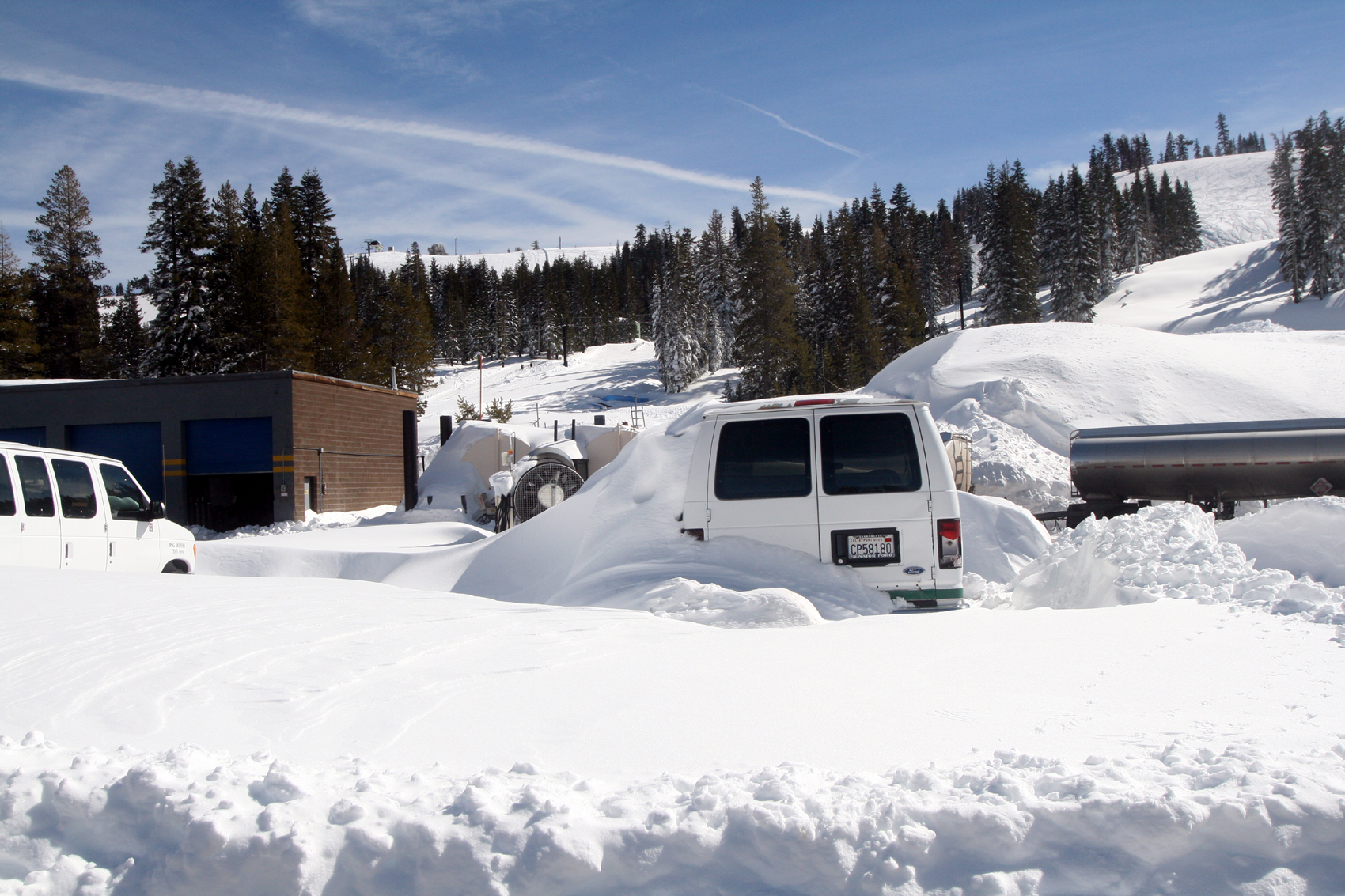
Parking lot at Boreal
