= Killington Peak =

Mountain in Vermont, United States

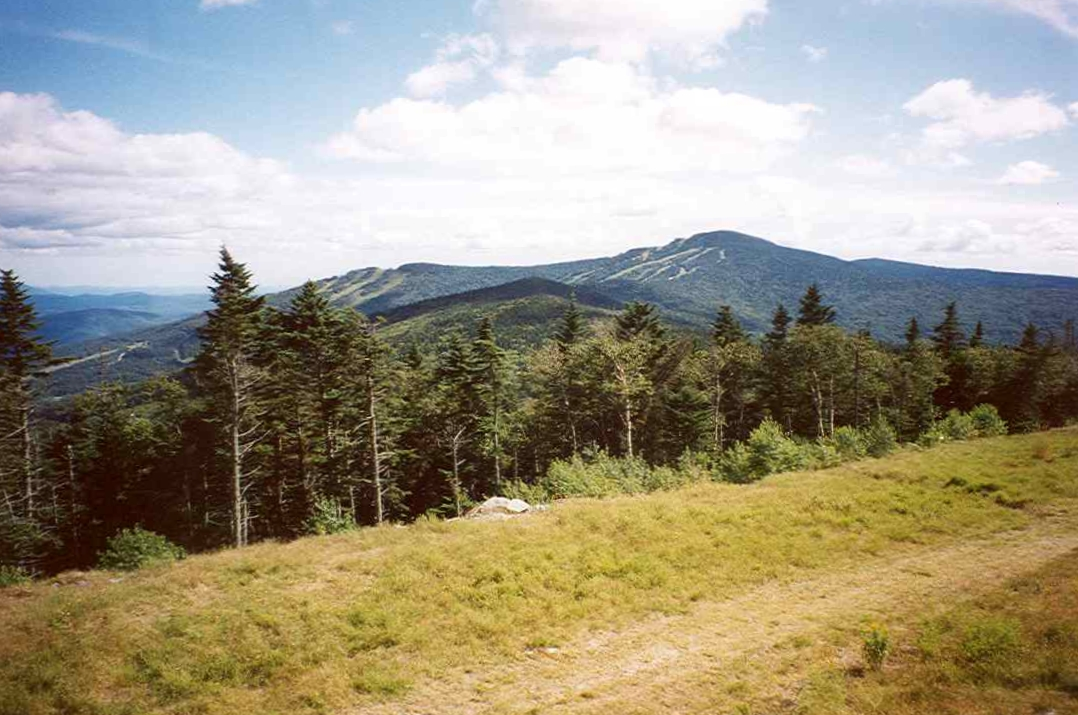
- Killington Peak seen from Pico Peak

Highest point
- Elevation: 4,229 ft (1,289 m) NAVD 88
- Prominence: 3,315 ft (1,010 m)
- Listing: New England 4,000 footers #5 New England Fifty Finest
- Coordinates: 43°36′16″N 72°49′12″W

Geography
- Location: Rutland County, Vermont, U.S.
- Parent range: Coolidge Range
- Topo map: USGS Killington Peak

Killington Peak is the second highest summit in the Green Mountains and in the U.S. state of Vermont. It is located east of Rutland in south-central Vermont. Killington Peak is a stop on the Long Trail, which here shares its route with the Appalachian Trail. Traveling southbound on the Trail, it is the last 4,000-foot (1,200 m) peak close to the trail until Virginia.

A ski resort, Killington Ski Resort, nicknamed "the beast of the east", is located on the mountain. A gondola transports skiers and non-hikers to the summit in winter, summer, and during fall leaf peeping season. There is a lodge near the peak which is complete with a restaurant and bar with panoramic views.

In 1763, the mountain was known as Pisgah. Killington (a.k.a. Sherburne) lodging situations have changed over the years, from sleeping on barroom floors and barns on the mountain road, traveling up from nearby Rutland or Woodstock, to the present day, in which the vicinity has over 120 inns, lodges, and condominium complexes. Their sleeping capacity brings this Central Vermont region's tourist population to 60,000+ on prime winter weekends.

== Climate ==
Climate data for Killington Peak 43.5944 N, 72.8234 W, Elevation: 3,780 ft (1,152 m) (1991–2020 normals)
Month	Jan	Feb	Mar	Apr	May	Jun	Jul	Aug	Sep	Oct	Nov	Dec	Year
Mean daily maximum °F (°C)	21.2 (−6.0)	23.5 (−4.7)	30.6 (−0.8)	46.2 (7.9)	58.1 (14.5)	66.3 (19.1)	70.5 (21.4)	69.2 (20.7)	63.9 (17.7)	51.5 (10.8)	35.9 (2.2)	26.2 (−3.2)	46.9 (8.3)
Daily mean °F (°C)	12.3 (−10.9)	14.1 (−9.9)	21.7 (−5.7)	35.5 (1.9)	48.1 (8.9)	57.1 (13.9)	61.7 (16.5)	60.4 (15.8)	54.3 (12.4)	42.2 (5.7)	28.6 (−1.9)	18.6 (−7.4)	37.9 (3.3)
Mean daily minimum °F (°C)	3.4 (−15.9)	4.7 (−15.2)	12.8 (−10.7)	24.9 (−3.9)	38.1 (3.4)	47.9 (8.8)	53.0 (11.7)	51.5 (10.8)	44.7 (7.1)	32.8 (0.4)	21.3 (−5.9)	11.0 (−11.7)	28.8 (−1.8)
Average precipitation inches (mm)	4.95 (126)	4.22 (107)	5.29 (134)	5.88 (149)	6.19 (157)	6.80 (173)	6.78 (172)	6.57 (167)	6.02 (153)	7.16 (182)	5.45 (138)	6.27 (159)	71.58 (1,817)
Source: PRISM Climate Group

== Gallery ==
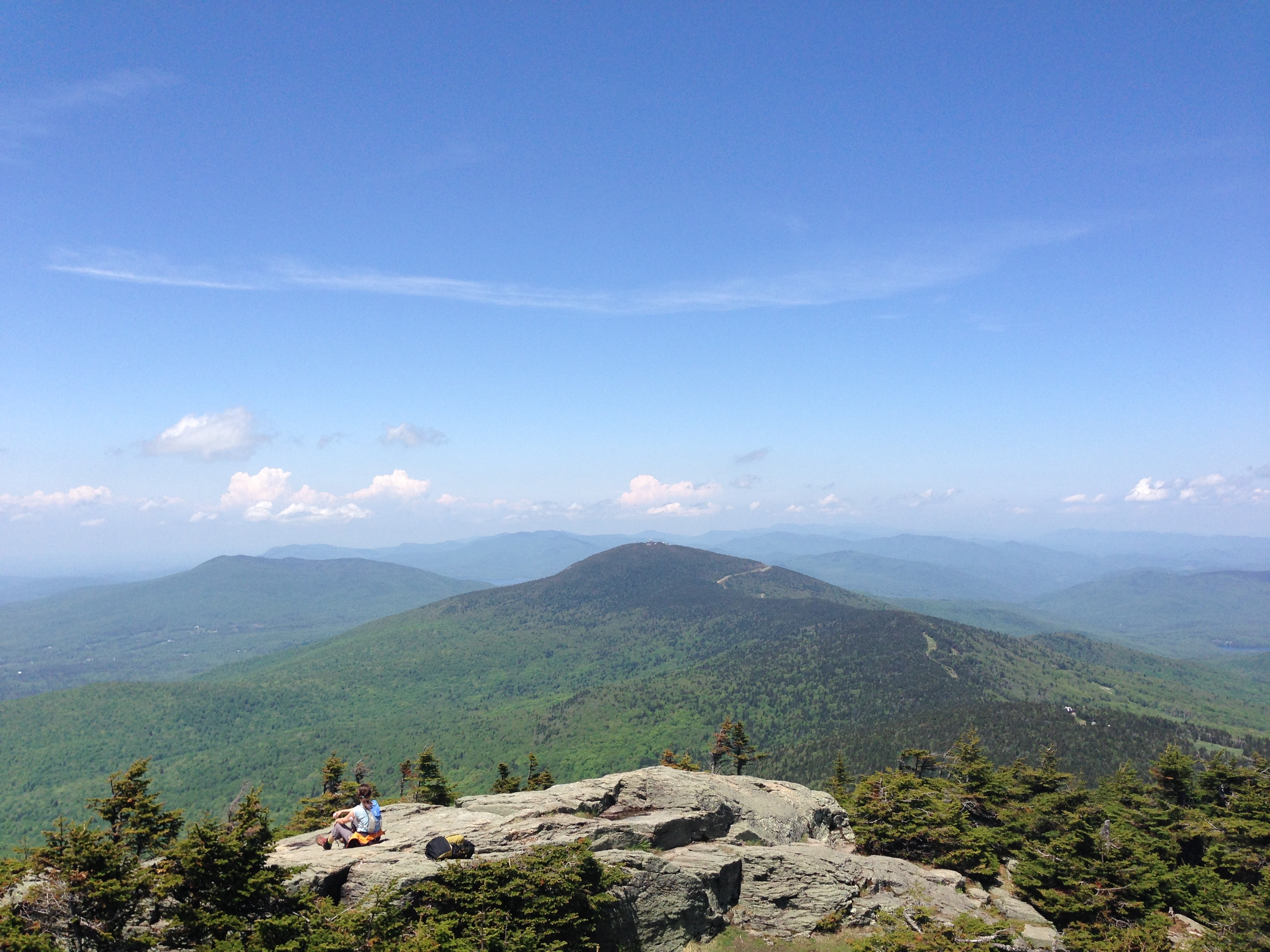

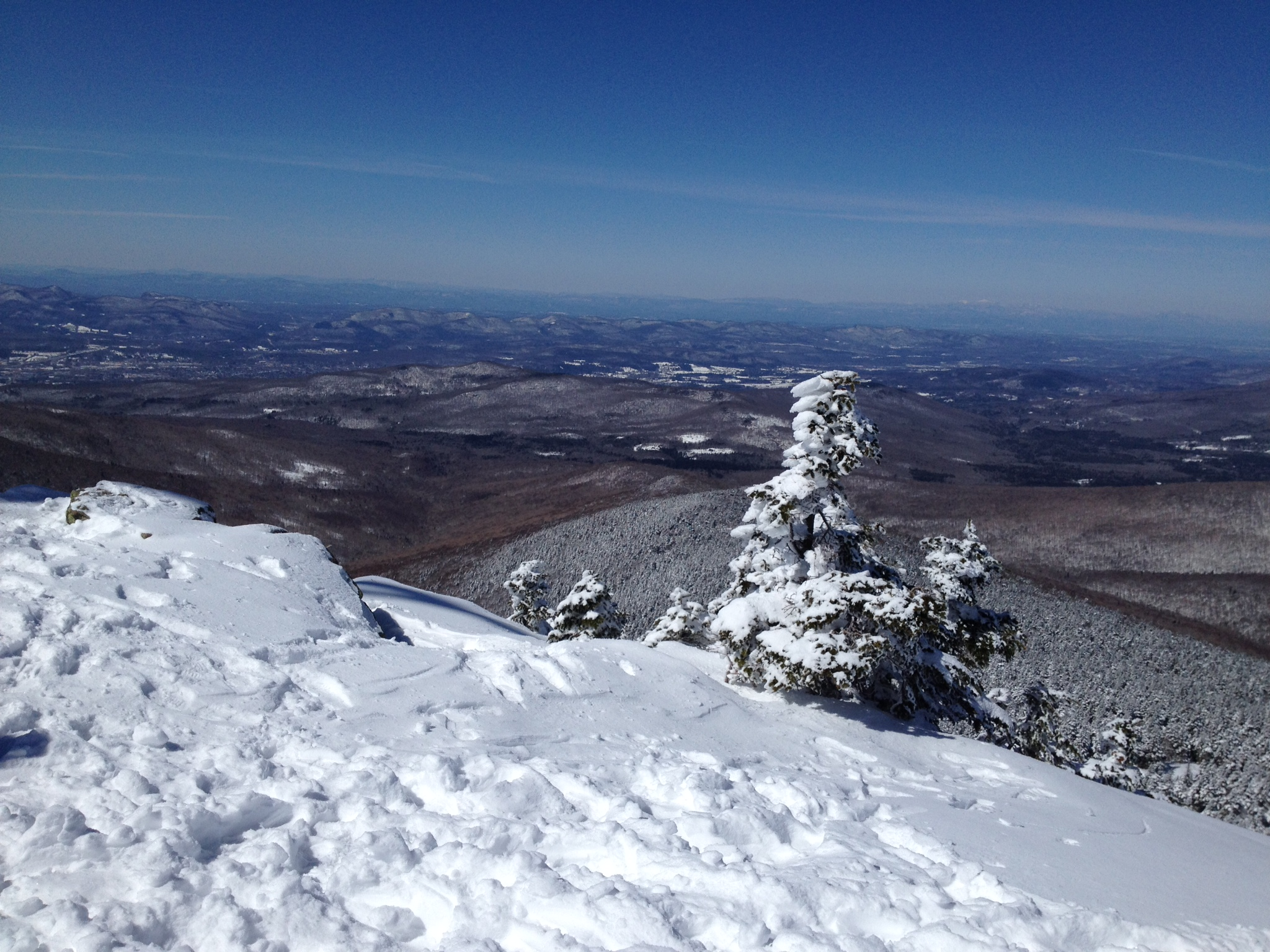

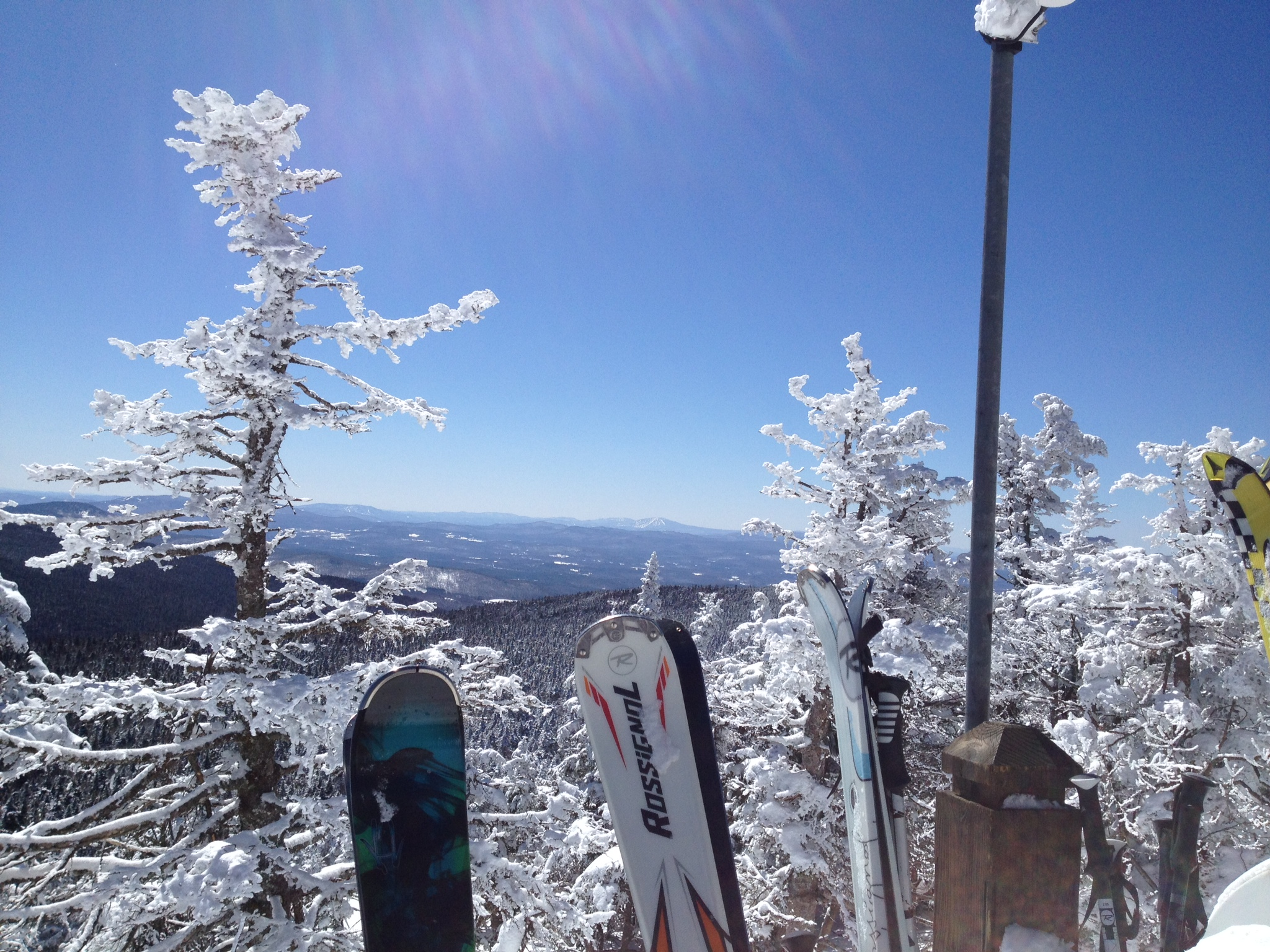

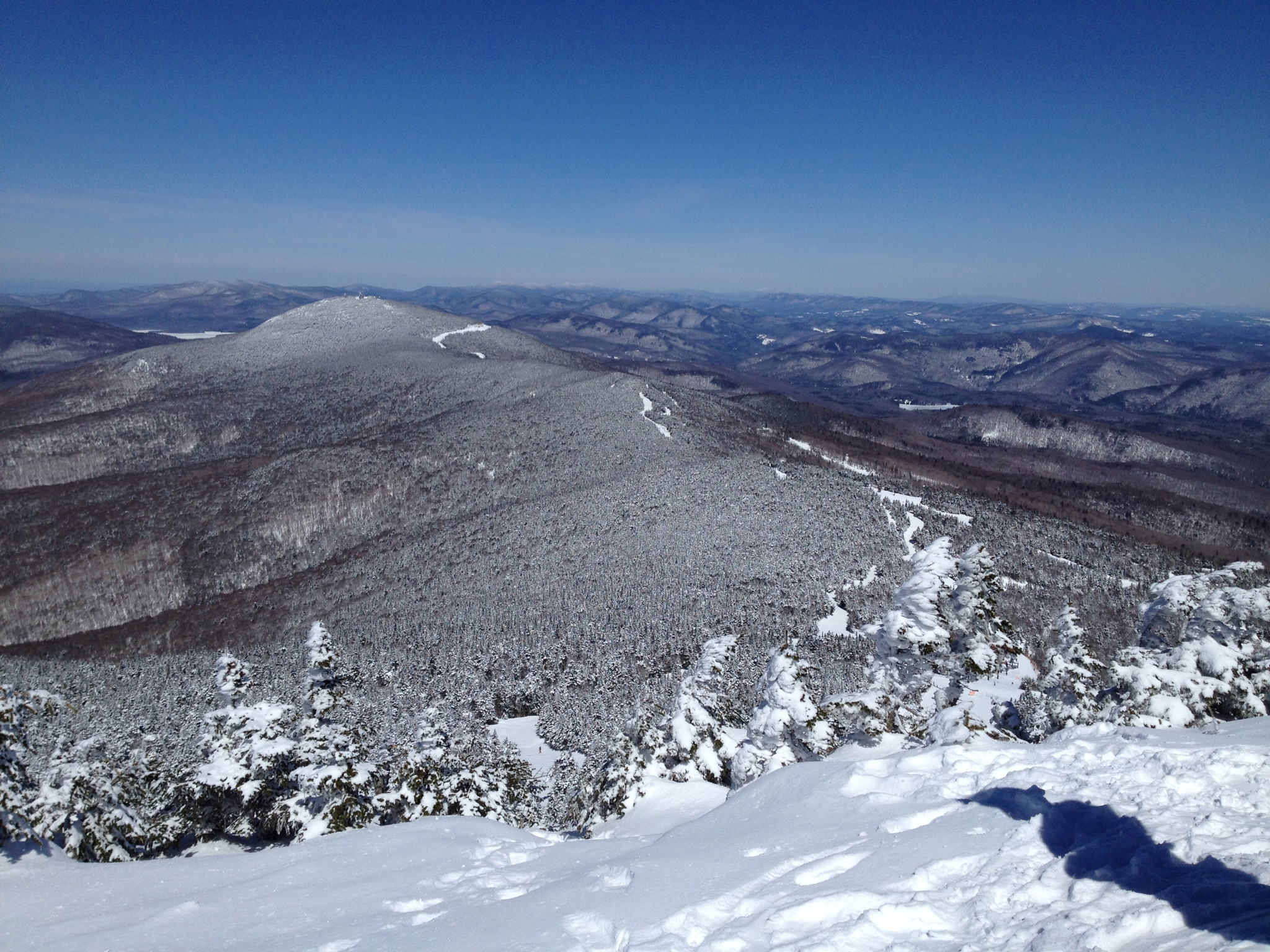

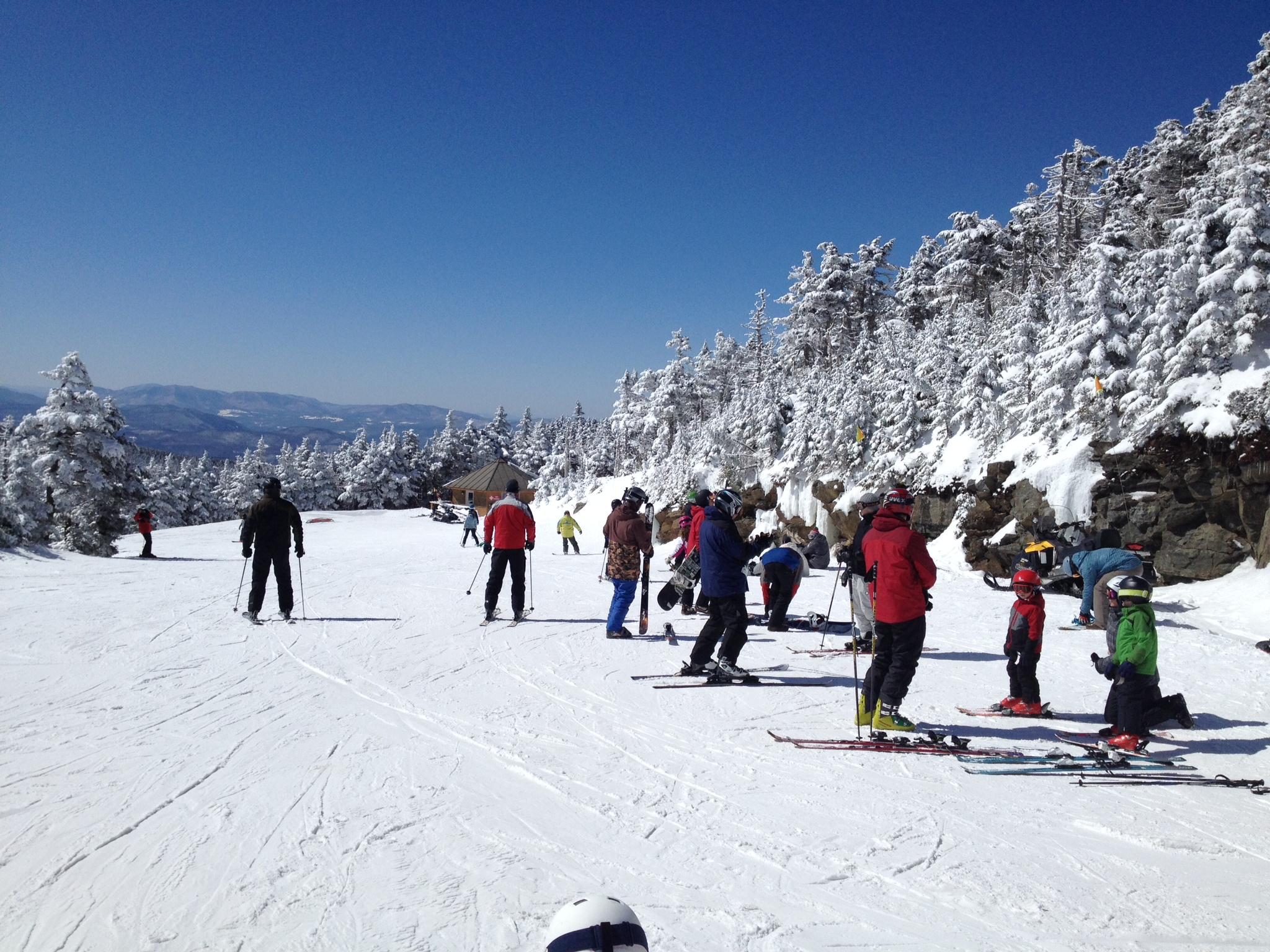
