= Silver Star Mountain Resort =

Ski resort in British Columbia, Canada

SilverStar Mountain Resort
- Location within British Columbia Location within Canada
- Location: British Columbia, Canada
- Nearest city: Vernon
- Coordinates: 50°21′35″N 119°03′29″W
- Vertical: 760 m (2,490 ft)
- Top elevation: 1,915 m (6,283 ft)
- Base elevation: 1,155 m (3,789 ft)
- Skiable area: 3,282 acres (13.3 km^{2})
- Trails: 132 Designated Trails; 15% Beginner; 40% Intermediate; 35% Expert; 10% Extreme
- Longest run: 8 km (5.0 mi)
- Lift system: 12 Total (1 8 person express gondola, 1 six-pack express, 2 detachable high-speed quads, 2 fixed grip quads,1 t-bar, 3 beginner magic carpets, 2 tube lifts)
- Lift capacity: 14,000 boarders/skiers per hour
- Terrain parks: Terrain Park
- Snowfall: 700 cm (280 in)
- Snowmaking: None
- Website: www.skisilverstar.com

Silver Star Mountain Resort (Silver Star) is a ski resort located near Silver Star Provincial Park in the Shuswap Highland of the Monashee Mountains, 22 km northeast of the city of Vernon, British Columbia, Canada. Silver Star's snow season runs from late November to mid-April, weather permitting. Silver Star provides summer lift access for mountain biking and hiking from the end of June through September.

Silver Star's current government leadership consists of local mayor Amanda Shatzko, MP Mel Arnold, and MLA Harwinder Sandhu.

== Terrain ==
Silver Star has an annual snowfall of 700 cm or 23 ft (7.0 m). There are a total of 132 marked trails, with a vertical drop of 760 m (2,500 ft). The elevation of the village is 1,609 m (5,279 ft), while the summit is 1,915 m (6,283 ft) above sea level.

Silver Star has a total of 12 lifts: One eight-seater gondola (Summit Express), one Six-Pack Express chairlift (Comet Six-Pack Express), two detachable high-speed quads (Silverwoods Express, Powder Gulch Express), two fixed-grip quads (Silver Queen Chair, Alpine Meadows Chair) one T-bar (Home Run T-bar), three beginner magic carpets, and two tube lifts, on 3,269 acres (13 km2) of skiable terrain. The resort spans over four mountain faces: Vance Creek, Attridge, Silver Woods, and Putnam Creek.

== Climate ==
Vernon Silver Star Lodge is a weather station near the summit of Silver Star Mountain, situated at an elevation of 1586 m (5203 ft). Vernon Silver Star Lodge has a subalpine climate (Köppen Dfc).

Climate data for Vernon Silver Star Lodge, British Columbia, 2003-2020 normals, 1970-2020 extremes: 1586m (5203ft)
| Month | Jan | Feb | Mar | Apr | May | Jun | Jul | Aug | Sep | Oct | Nov | Dec | Year |
|---|---|---|---|---|---|---|---|---|---|---|---|---|---|
| Record high °C (°F) | 11 (52) | 12 (54) | 15 (59) | 21 (69) | 26 (79) | 30 (86) | 33 (91) | 35 (95) | 29 (84) | 22 (71) | 19 (67) | 7 (45) | 35 (95) |
| Mean maximum °C (°F) | 2.9 (37.3) | 4.3 (39.8) | 8.6 (47.5) | 13.9 (57.0) | 19.7 (67.5) | 23.9 (75.1) | 28.0 (82.4) | 27.9 (82.2) | 21.8 (71.3) | 14.9 (58.9) | 6.5 (43.7) | 2.2 (35.9) | 29.1 (84.4) |
| Mean daily maximum °C (°F) | −3.4 (25.9) | −2.1 (28.2) | 1.5 (34.7) | 6.1 (42.9) | 11.5 (52.7) | 15.7 (60.3) | 20.2 (68.3) | 20.1 (68.2) | 13.8 (56.8) | 6.4 (43.5) | −1.2 (29.8) | −4.3 (24.2) | 7.0 (44.6) |
| Daily mean °C (°F) | −6.2 (20.8) | −5.6 (21.9) | −2.7 (27.2) | 1.1 (34.0) | 6.5 (43.7) | 10.7 (51.3) | 14.8 (58.6) | 14.7 (58.5) | 9.4 (48.9) | 2.7 (36.8) | −4.1 (24.6) | −7.3 (18.9) | 2.8 (37.1) |
| Mean daily minimum °C (°F) | −9.3 (15.2) | −9.3 (15.3) | −6.8 (19.8) | −3.8 (25.2) | 1.6 (34.8) | 5.5 (41.9) | 9.4 (49.0) | 9.3 (48.8) | 4.8 (40.7) | −1.1 (30.0) | −7.1 (19.2) | −10.4 (13.3) | −1.4 (29.4) |
| Mean minimum °C (°F) | −20.4 (−4.7) | −18.7 (−1.6) | −16.1 (3.1) | −9.2 (15.4) | −3.4 (25.8) | 0.1 (32.1) | 2.1 (35.8) | 2.6 (36.6) | −0.3 (31.5) | −7.9 (17.8) | −16.2 (2.9) | −19.7 (−3.4) | −27.4 (−17.3) |
| Record low °C (°F) | −33 (−28) | −30 (−22) | −31 (−24) | −16 (4) | −10 (14) | −6 (21) | −2 (28) | −3 (27) | −6 (22) | −17 (1) | −35 (−31) | −33 (−27) | −35 (−31) |
| Average precipitation mm (inches) | 113 (4.45) | 85 (3.36) | 86 (3.40) | 34 (1.35) | 40 (1.59) | 57 (2.23) | 57 (2.23) | 31 (1.24) | 49 (1.91) | 51 (2.00) | 88 (3.48) | 112 (4.39) | 803 (31.63) |
| Average snowfall cm (inches) | 113 (44.4) | 85 (33.5) | 86 (33.7) | 33 (12.9) | 9.7 (3.8) | 2.0 (0.8) | trace | 0.0 (0.0) | 4.1 (1.6) | 28 (11.2) | 86 (33.9) | 108 (42.4) | 554.8 (218.2) |
Source: XMACIS2 (normals, extremes & precip/snow)

== History ==
The Early Days

Vernon resident Bert Thorburn became the first person to ski in the Silver Star area in 1930. In 1946, the first rope tow was built on Burney Ridge, south of Vernon, above the lookout overlooking Kalamalka Lake, which is 800 ft (240 m) long. An old four-cylinder engine powered it. The cooling system was a 40-gallon water drum hooked up to the radiator. For $.50, visitors could ski all day.

A few years later, the ski hill was moved to Lavington on Michael Freeman's farm on the north slope above Highway 6, but skiing was limited to a few months of the year.

Initially, Silver Star was part of a Class A provincial park with no development allowed. Silver Star Sports got approval from the Province to build a ski hill in the Class A park in the summer of 1957. In 1958, the final three kilometers of the Silver Star road were pushed through to the village area.

Two rope-tow lifts and an A-frame day lodge were built in 1958. In 1959, a poma lift was installed from the 5,000-foot (1,500 m) level at the parking lot to the top of SilverStar Mountain, replacing the rope tow. In 1964, new T-bars were installed to replace the slower rope tows, and in 1965, a second A-frame structure was added to the day lodge. In 1967 and 1968, the Summit and Yellow Chairs (6,000 feet) built by GMD Mueller were installed.

SilverStar Mountain Resort Era

In 1981, Silver Star Sports became Silver Star Mountain Resorts Ltd. In 1983, the Putnam Station Hotel was built. From 1984 to 1990, many new hotels and amenities were built on the hill. In 1990, the Silver Queen chair was built by Yan and replaced by a Doppelmayr quad chair, and it now serves as the bunny hill. In 1991 the original Putnam Creek and Vance Creek express quads were built and opened up terrain. In 2001, the Schumann family, owners of Big White Ski Resort since 1985, reached an agreement in principle with the Judd Buchanan, the majority shareholder of Silver Star Mountain Resort, on the purchase of the majority assets of Silver Star Mountain Resort.

In 2002 Silver Star Mountain Resort invested in new chair lifts and opening up new terrain followed by further expansion in 2005/06 to open up the Silver Woods ski area. The Comet Express, made by Leitner-Poma and carrying a rated 2600 passengers per hour, is Canada's largest 6-passenger chairlift. 2005 saw the expansion of the Silver Star Bike Park to start using the Comet Six-Pack chairlift for biking.

In 2012, following the death of her father, Desmond Schumann, Jane Cann received 100% stake in Siver Star Resort. Cann's brother Peter Schumann was given ownership of Big White. Formerly operated as a joint venture, the two resorts became separate entities.

On July 14, 2018, Silver Star held an opening event for its new Gondola, the Schumann Summit Express. The Gondola was manufactured by Doppelmayr. It can transport skiers and mountain bikers from the mid-mountain village to the summit in 4.4 minutes.

On December 3, 2019 it was announced that SilverStar had been sold to Powdr Corporation, a Utah-based owner of ski resorts.

== See also ==
- List of ski areas and resorts in Canada
- Skiing
- Snowboarding
- Mountain biking
