= Pico Mountain =

Ski area in Vermont, United States

Coordinates: 43°39′42″N 72°50′33″W

Pico Mountain Ski Resort
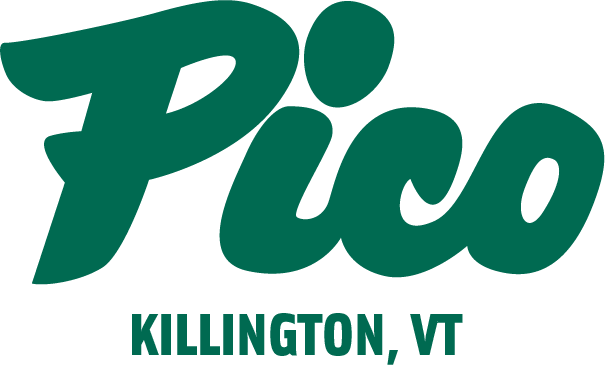

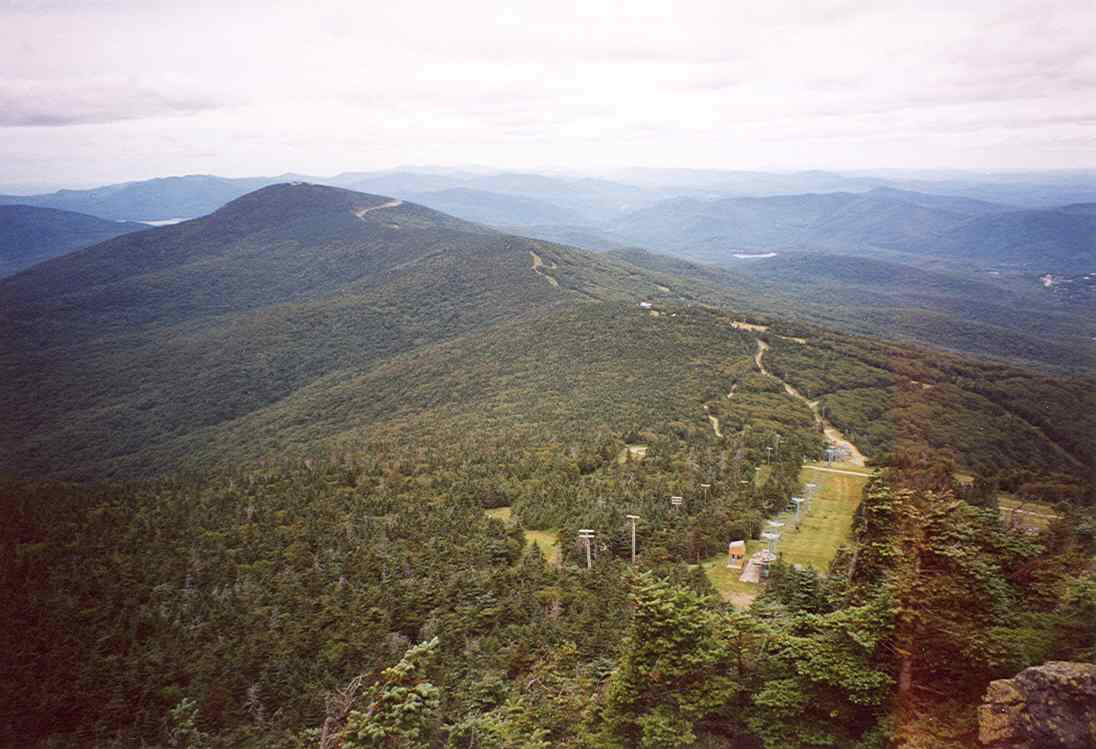
- Pico Peak ski runs as seen from Killington in 2003
- Interactive map of Pico Mountain Ski Resort
- Location: Killington, Vermont, United States
- Nearest city: Rutland, Vermont
- Vertical: 1,967 feet (600 m)
- Top elevation: 3,967 feet (1,209 m)
- Base elevation: 2,000 feet (610 m)
- Skiable area: 468 acres (189 ha)
- Trails: 58
- Longest run: Upper-Mid-Lower Pike
- Lift system: 7 total
- Snowfall: 250 inches (640 cm)
- Snowmaking: 75%
- Website: picomountain.com

Pico Mountain Ski Resort is a ski area located in Killington, Vermont, United States. Established in 1937, it was one of the first commercial ski resorts in the state. The base of the resort is located on the northwest side of Pico Peak on U.S. Route 4 approximately 9 miles (14 kilometers) northeast of Rutland, Vermont, and 3 mi (5 km) north of Killington Peak. The site lies just inside the town line that separates Killington from the Town of Mendon, to its west. The mountain now features 58 trails and 7 lifts with a 1,967-foot (600-meter) vertical drop.

== History ==
Pico first opened as Pico Peak on Thanksgiving day, in 1937. The first T-bar lift in the US began operation there in 1940. The Mead family founded the ski resort. Their daughter, Andrea Mead-Lawrence, won a pair of gold medals in skiing in the 1952 Winter Olympics in Oslo, Norway. Pico soon began expansion, installing its first chairlift in 1954 and expanding to the current summit in 1965. By its 50th anniversary in 1987, Pico had become a major resort in the region with high speed quads, snowmaking, and a new sportcenter.

In 1996, the resort went into receivership and was bought by the nearby Killington Mountain Resort and Ski Area in December 1997. However, ski runs have not yet been cut to connect the two resorts. The only access is along a sewer line that runs from Killington to Rutland, which allows for equipment (snowmobiles and groomers) to go from one area to the other. Most passes purchased for Killington are valid at Pico, but Pico passes are not valid at Killington. Pico celebrated its 75th anniversary in 2013.

Pico Mountain is home to a Vermont Ski and Snowboard Museum exhibit, located on the third level of the main base lodge.

== Skiing the mountain ==
The mountain contains 468 acres (189 hectares) of skiable land on 58 trails of varying difficulty, divided into several lift areas. The trails from atop the golden express cater mainly to families and other beginner and intermediate riders. The trails which run from the peak of the mountain are generally steeper and mainly black diamond trails used by experts. They are reached via the summit express, which loads at mid mountain. Another area of Pico is Outpost. This region relies primarily on natural snow and is served by the outpost double, Pico's oldest lift. This area has seen less use in recent years. A very challenging area known as "Little Pico", has some of the toughest terrain. Pico also contains a freestyle terrain park, Triple slope, which contains small and medium size features.
