= Killington Ski Resort =

Ski resort in Vermont, United States

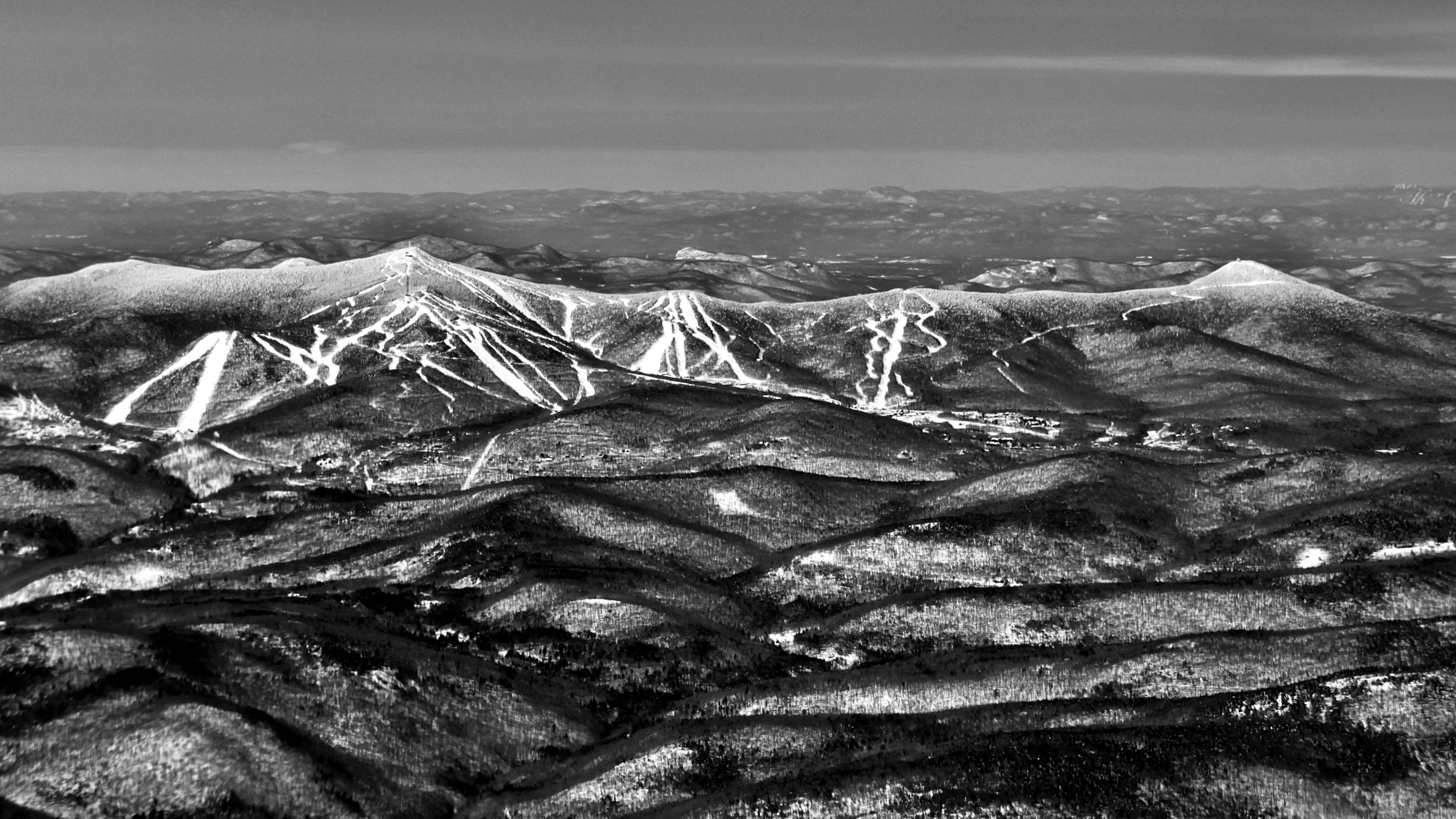
- Aerial view of Killington resort looking West

- Location within the United States Location within Vermont
- Location: Killington, Vermont, U.S.
- Nearest city: Rutland – 15 miles (24 km)
- Coordinates: 43.626°N 72.798°W
- Status: Operating
- Owner: Independent
- Vertical: 3,076 ft (938 m)
- Top elevation: 4,241 ft (1,293 m) NAVD 88
- Base elevation: 1,165 ft (355 m) (Skyeship)
- Skiable area: 1,509 acres (6.1 km^{2})
- Trails: 155 – 28% beginner – 33% intermediate – 39% advanced
- Lift system: https://liftblog.com/killington-vt/
- Lift capacity: 37,535 per hour
- Snowfall: 250 inches (640 cm)
- Snowmaking: 71%
- Website: killington.com

Killington Mountain Resort & Ski Area is a ski resort in Rutland County, Vermont, United States, near the town of Killington. It is the largest ski area in the eastern U.S., and has the largest vertical drop in New England at 3,050 feet (930 meters). The mountain has been nicknamed the "Beast of the East."

== History ==
In 1954, Perry H. Merrill, known as the Father of Vermont's State Parks and Alpine Ski Areas and Vermont State's land lease officer, wanted to see a ski resort developed on Killington Peak, the second highest mountain in Vermont. Preston Leete Smith agreed to work with him to develop this area. Killington opened on December 13, 1958.

The resort expanded in the 1960s at a pace "well above industry standards." Many new trails were created and Smith had beginner trails accessible from every lift. In the 1960s, Killington installed snowmaking equipment, which had been invented in the 1950s, but was considered a banana belt luxury. Several low-snow seasons proved their value.

Killington introduced the ticket wicket in 1963 to prevent skiers sharing lift tickets, while also not damaging ski clothing.

Extensive investment in the mid-1990s by American Skiing Company gave Killington a modernized lift system, similar in footprint to what exists today. Killington Peak was once accessible by the original three-stage Killington Gondola and Killington Double. The Skyeship Gondola replaced the first two stages of the Killington Gondola, running from the Skyeship base near Route 4 through the Needle's Eye area and up to Skye Peak, but not on to Killington Peak. The K-1 gondola replaced the earlier Killington Peak double chairlift in the same alignment, significantly increasing capacity out of the main base. Other lift installations in this era included the Ramshead and Needles Eye express quads, and a quad connecting Needle's Eye with the top of Snowshed.

In the summer of 2011, the Killington area was damaged by Tropical Storm Irene in late August, which caused flooding and damage along U.S. Route 4, the road leading into Killington. The resort was damaged by excess runoff from Ottauquechee River, which lifted the Superstar Pub off of its foundation, condemning the structure. Killington has since repaired damaged infrastructure, and is operating at full or near-full potential.

=== Ownership ===
Date	Owner	Notes
December 1958	Sherburne Corporation	Initial development
November 1984	S-K-I Limited	Sherburne Corporation a publicly traded was renamed S-K-I Ltd. (Sherburne-Killington-Investments) and became a Nasdaq listed company.
February 1996	American Skiing Company	Originally LBO Resort Enterprises Corporation
May 11, 2007	Powdr Corporation and SP Land Company	Park City-based Powdr Corporation was the operator; SP Land Company announced real estate development, including a ski village, probably beginning in 2009. SP Land is an affiliate of Ski Partners LLC, which is in turn affiliated with E2M Partners LLC, a private equity fund. SP Land was formed in 2004 and acquired most of the developable land at the base of the resort.
September 27, 2024	Killington Independence Group	Local passholders and community members formed the Killington Independence Group and purchased Killington/Pico from Powdr.

The last mention of the development of Killington Village was in February 2014 when SP Land Company, LLC. filed its Act 250 permit application for the $133.4 million Phase 1 of development, along with the conceptual Killington Village Master Plan and a revised application for what is referred to as the Overall Subdivision.

Shortly after the acquisition in 2007, Powdr announced that it will stop honoring "lifetime" lift passes issued by the previous owners after two years. A class action lawsuit was filed on behalf of about 800 pass holders.

== Skiing Killington ==
Located in central Vermont, Killington has 155 trails, 21 lifts, and 1,509 acres (6.1 km^{2}) extending across six interconnected mountain peaks. A seventh peak, Pico Mountain, was purchased by Killington in 1996, but operates as a separate resort on the same lift tickets. There have been several proposals to connect Killington and Pico with a series of lifts and trails since 1998, however, no plans have been finalized.

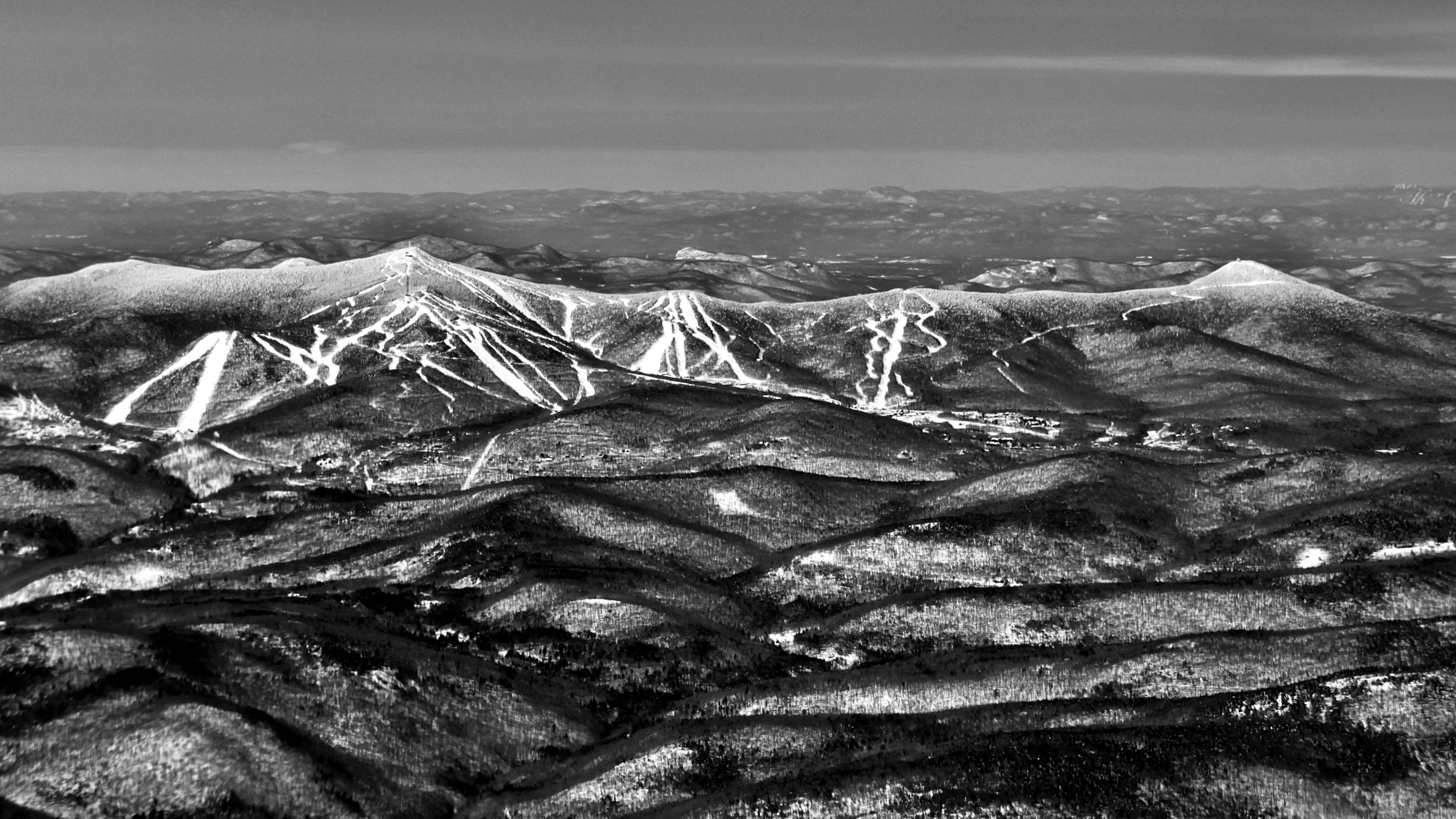
Aerial Photo of Killington’s 6 Peaks

The primary mountain is Killington Peak at 4,229 ft (1,289 m), which has the second-highest summit in Vermont and has the second greatest vertical drop in the eastern United States (3,050 ft (930 m)), after Whiteface Mountain in Wilmington, New York, at 3,430 ft (1,045 m).

The mountains that make up the Killington resort separate the town of Killington (with its access road) from the city of Rutland.

=== Trails ===
The resort offers trails ranging from beginner to expert. Part of the mountain is set aside for terrain parks, with five snowboard and alpine parks. Killington has several learning areas for first-time skiers, mainly located around the Ramshead and Snowshed base areas.

Killington has one of the east's largest half-pipes located at Bear Mountain for a portion of each winter season. There are boarder cross terrain and at least three to five major trails with ramps and jumps.

Famed ski map creator, James Niehues, hand-painted the Killington ski map in 1990.

=== Mountains ===
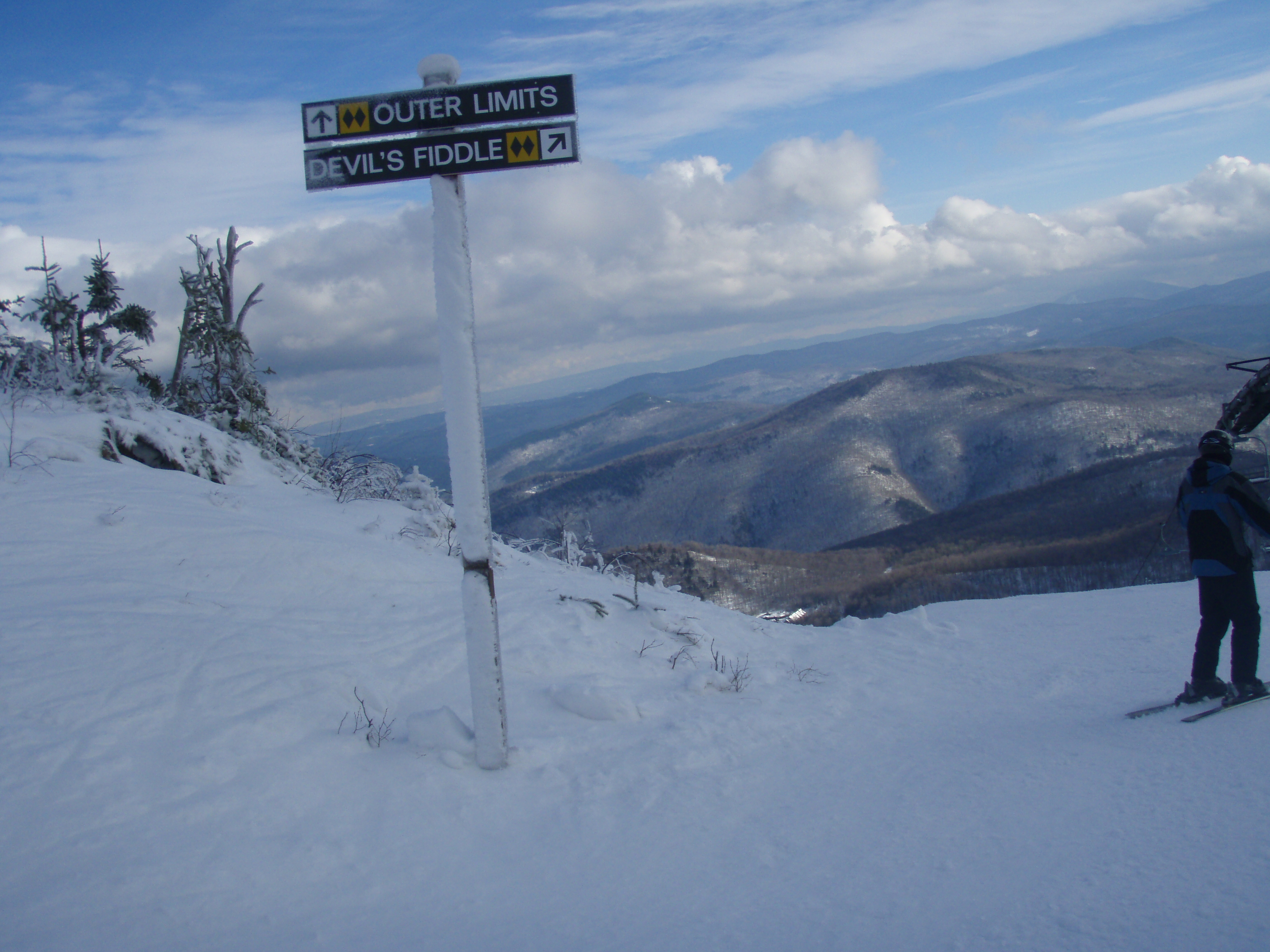
A sign pointing to Devil's Fiddle and Outer Limits, some of the steepest trails at Killington

- Snowshed, devoted to beginners, is serviced by a high-speed quad and one double lift, which used to be a double-double. Snowshed is an open slope, with a lodge and restaurant at the bottom. The adult ski school is located at Snowshed. The Killington Grand Hotel is located near the bottom of Snowshed, across a pond.
- Ramshead Mountain features beginner and intermediate terrain serviced by a Poma express quad lift, and a Poma platter lift for race training on Swirl trail. The youth ski school is located at the Ramshead base lodge. "Squeeze Play" is an easy gladed trail with wide gaps between trees and a relatively flat profile.
- Snowdon Mountain provides a variety of beginner, intermediate and expert trails. Among the trails are Conclusion, rated double black diamond, and Great Northern, a beginner trail. There are two chairlifts, a Heron-Poma quad out of the K-1 base and a Detachable Six-Pack with blue bubble chairs based near the end of Caper and Chute.
- Killington Peak is the highest of the six mountain peaks. It includes the "Canyon Area", near the top, with some of the steepest terrain on the mountain. There are several double black diamond trails there, including Cascade, Downdraft, Double Dipper, and the Big Dipper Glade. It is serviced by the Poma-built K-1 gondola, North Ridge Quad, and the Canyon Quad. The eastern U.S. ski season traditionally begins here, on Rime and Reason in the North Ridge area. Easier trails, Bear Trax and Great Northern, connect this peak to the rest of the mountain. There are lodges with restaurants at both the summit and base of Killington Peak.
- Skye Peak includes every type of terrain available. Trails include upper Vertigo, the steepest non-gladed trail at Killington, Ovation, another steep double-black diamond, Great Eastern, a long green running approximately four miles off Skye Peak. Superstar has extensive snowmaking, which serves the dual function of hosting World Cup races in November and allowing Killington to stay open until late May or early June. It is serviced by the Yan-built Superstar Express Quad, the 2008 Leitner-Poma Skye Peak Express Quad, and the Skyeship Express Gondola, erected in 1994.
- Bear Mountain is home to Outer Limits, a very steep double black diamond mogul run which is home to the Bear Mountain Mogul Challenge, and Devil's Fiddle, another double black diamond. Bear Mountain also features terrain parks, including a superpipe. It is serviced by one quad lift up Outer Limits following the removal of the Devils Fiddle Quad and has a lodge and restaurant. Bear Mountain frequently hosts large-scale competitive racing and freestyle events.

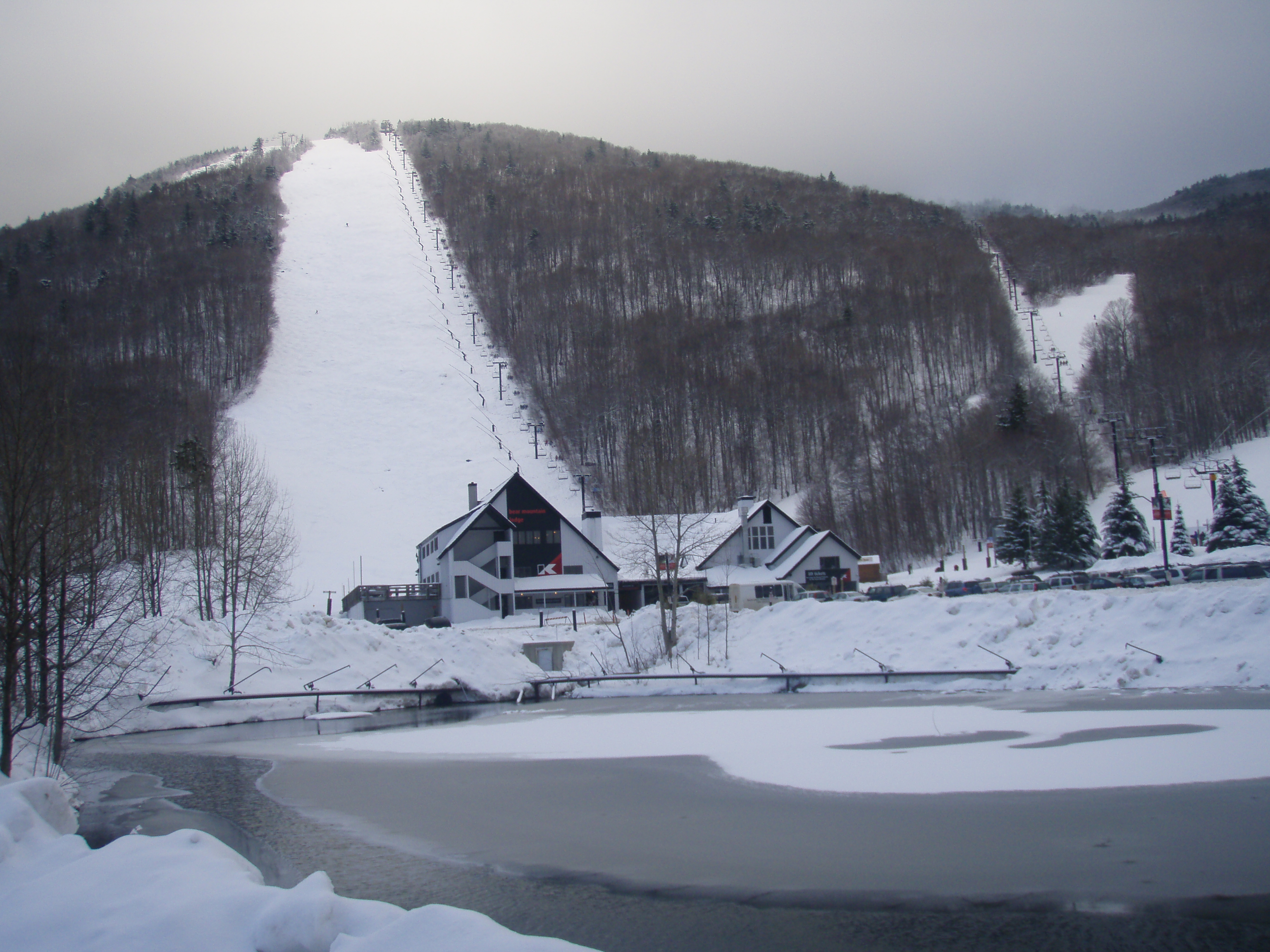
Bear Mountain

- Sunrise Mountain: Sunrise Mountain is serviced by one lift and is all beginner terrain. It was developed in the early 1980s with the Northeast Passage lift, which at the time was billed as the world's longest triple chair, extending nearly three miles to the corner of US-4 and VT-100 in West Bridgewater. Due to the relatively low elevation and poor exposure, Killington had difficulty maintaining snow cover on the lower portions, so they were removed from the trail system in the late 1990s, ending the "Northeast Passage" entrance into Killington. The upper portion of the lift was maintained by Sunrise Condos, and provides them with direct access to the rest of the mountain. Killington originally opened Sunrise with the intention of expanding skiing trails and lifts southeast into an area known as Parker's Gore. When these plans were halted due to concerns for bear habitat, the costs of snowmaking and maintaining terrain at such a low elevation were no longer justified by the few skiers utilizing the area.

==== Pico Mountain ====
Pico Mountain is located on a separate mountain, Pico Peak, several miles away from the main resort. It has 57 trails covering 19 mi (31 km), all serviced by seven lifts including two high-speed quads. Runs include The Pike, 49er, Summit Glades, Upper KA, Giant Killer, and Sunset 71. There are hotels, condos and restaurants at the base. The mountain is accessible from the main base by car or bus.

Pico was once an independent ski resort called Pico Peak, and was bought out of bankruptcy by American Skiing Company which also owned Killington in the mid-1990s. Upon the collapse of ASC, Powdr Corp. bought both mountains and continues to operate them. Lift tickets at Killington are currently valid at Pico. There have been plans to connect Pico to the main Killington resort since it was purchased. Connector trails have been cut (and are often used for maintenance purposes), and it is possible to ski from Pico to Killington when natural snow allows. Combined, the two resorts offer over 1977 acres of skiable terrain.

=== Snow and season length ===
Killington averages 250 inches (20.8 ft; 6.4 m) of natural snow each winter, coupled with a snowmaking system that covers 71% of the trails. This has allowed Killington to offer what is often the longest skiing season in eastern North America, which usually spans from late October to late May, over 200 days. It has opened as early as October 1 and closed as late as June 22. Killington had a reputation for being the first ski area every season in the eastern U.S. to open, as well as the last to close, although in recent years the length of the season has begun to shorten. For example, in the 15 years between 1986 and 2001, the resort opened in October in every year but one, and never closed earlier than May 21. But in the five years ending in 2011, opening day has always been in November, and closing day has never made it past May 6. The years after 2011 have reversed this trend slightly with the 2019 season ending June 2 and the 2022 season ending June 4. The 2020 season ended early on March 14 due to the COVID-19 pandemic.

=== World Cup races ===
Since Nov 2016, Killington has hosted the World Cup tour, with women's technical events (giant slalom, slalom) on Thanksgiving weekend, held on the "Superstar" run. American Mikaela Shiffrin won the slalom events in each of the race's first five offerings.

Season	Date	Giant Slalom Winner	Date	Slalom Winner
2017	Nov 26, 2016	(France) Tessa Worley	Nov 27, 2016	(United States) Mikaela Shiffrin
2018	Nov 25, 2017	(Germany) Viktoria Rebensburg	Nov 26, 2017	(United States) Mikaela Shiffrin
2019	Nov 24, 2018	(Italy) Federica Brignone	Nov 25, 2018	(United States) Mikaela Shiffrin
2020	Nov 30, 2019	(Italy) Marta Bassino	Dec 1, 2019	(United States) Mikaela Shiffrin
2022	Nov 27, 2021	cancelled due to strong wind	Nov 28, 2021	(United States) Mikaela Shiffrin (5)
2023	Nov 26, 2022	(Switzerland) Lara Gut-Behrami	Nov 27, 2022	(Switzerland) Wendy Holdener (Sweden) Anna Swenn-Larsson
2025	Nov 30, 2024	(Sweden) Sara Hector	Dec 1, 2024	(Switzerland) Camille Rast

Prior to 2016, the most recent World Cup races in the eastern U.S. were in March 1991 at Waterville Valley in New Hampshire; the last in Vermont were in March 1978 at Stratton Mountain.

== Mountain statistics ==
The base elevation is 1,165 ft (355 m) above sea level and the vertical drop is 3,050 ft (930 m).

- Summit elevation (Killington Peak) 4,229 ft (1,289 m) NAVD 88
- Pico Peak – 3,967 ft (1,209 m)
- Skye Peak – 3,800 ft (1,158 m)
- Ramshead Peak – 3,610 ft (1,100 m)
- Snowdon Peak – 3,592 ft (1,095 m)
- Bear Mountain – 3,295 ft (1,004 m)
- Sunrise Mountain – 2,456 ft (749 m)

=== Trails ===
- 212 trails (including Pico Mountain) measuring 73 miles (117 km)

- – Easier 28%
- – More Difficult 33%
- – Most Difficult: 39%

=== Lift roster ===
- Killington has 21 Lifts.

Lift Name	Type	Builder	Built	Length (feet)	Vertical Rise (feet)	Notes
Skyeship Stage I	Gondola 8	Poma	1994	7848	1187	Starts from Rt.100 and travels to the Needle's Eye area. New cabins installed in 2025.
Skyeship Stage II	Gondola 8	Poma	1994	5105	1335	Extends from Needle's Eye to Skye Peak. New cabins installed in 2025.
K-I Gondola	Gondola 8	Poma	1997	6453	1642	Main lift to Killington Summit, new cabins in 2018.
Snowdon Six	High Speed Six	Leitner-Poma	2018	4428	1114	Has Blue Bubbles. Replaced the Snowdon Quad chairlift, which was then relocated to become the South Ridge Quad.
Superstar Express Six	High Speed Six	Doppelmayr	2025	3459	1201	Replaced Superstar Express Quad with same alignment.
Needles Eye Express	High Speed Quad	Poma	1996	3590	990	Parallel to Skyeship Stage II on shorter alignment.
Ramshead Express	High Speed Quad	Poma	1996	5499	1073	
Skye Peak Express	High Speed Quad	Leitner-Poma	2008	4926	1525	Runs from Bear Mountain Base to Skye Peak.
Snowshed Express	High Speed Quad	Yan/Poma	1987	3532	549	Retrofitted by Poma in 1994.
Bear Mountain	Fixed-grip quad	Yan	1979	2825	1184	
Canyon	Fixed-grip quad	Yan	1990	3638	1193	
North Ridge	Fixed-grip quad	Leitner-Poma	2019	2295	587	Replaced a triple chair in same alignment.
Northbrook	Fixed-grip quad	Poma	1996	2279	401	
South Ridge	Fixed-grip quad	Poma	2018	3979	863	Originally installed as the Snowdon Quad, then relocated to South Ridge when the Snowdon Six was installed.
Snowdon	Fixed Grip quad	Doppelmayr	2026	4435	1070	Has a mid-station for unloading only.
Sunrise Village	Fixed-grip triple	Yan	1982	3088	434	The bottom terminal was moved uphill in 1999 with the closure of the Northeast Passage base area.
Snowshed I	Fixed-grip double	Yan	1987	3280	529	Used to be 2 doubles, but now only Snowshed I remains
Alpine Training Venue	Platter	Poma	2018	2000	462	One of the first lifts to be installed as the Upper Snowdon Poma, then relocated to upper Ramshead for race training. Closed to the public.
Learn-To Carpet	Magic Carpet				49	
Progression Carpet I	Magic Carpet				11	

== Summer ==
Killington has 45 miles (72 km) of hiking and mountain biking trails, and an 18-hole golf course. It also has lift accessed mountain biking in the summer with technical trail features, jumps, and other obstacles. In March 2015, the resort successfully applied to the state for permit allowing them to add zip lines and a mountain coaster.

== Image gallery ==
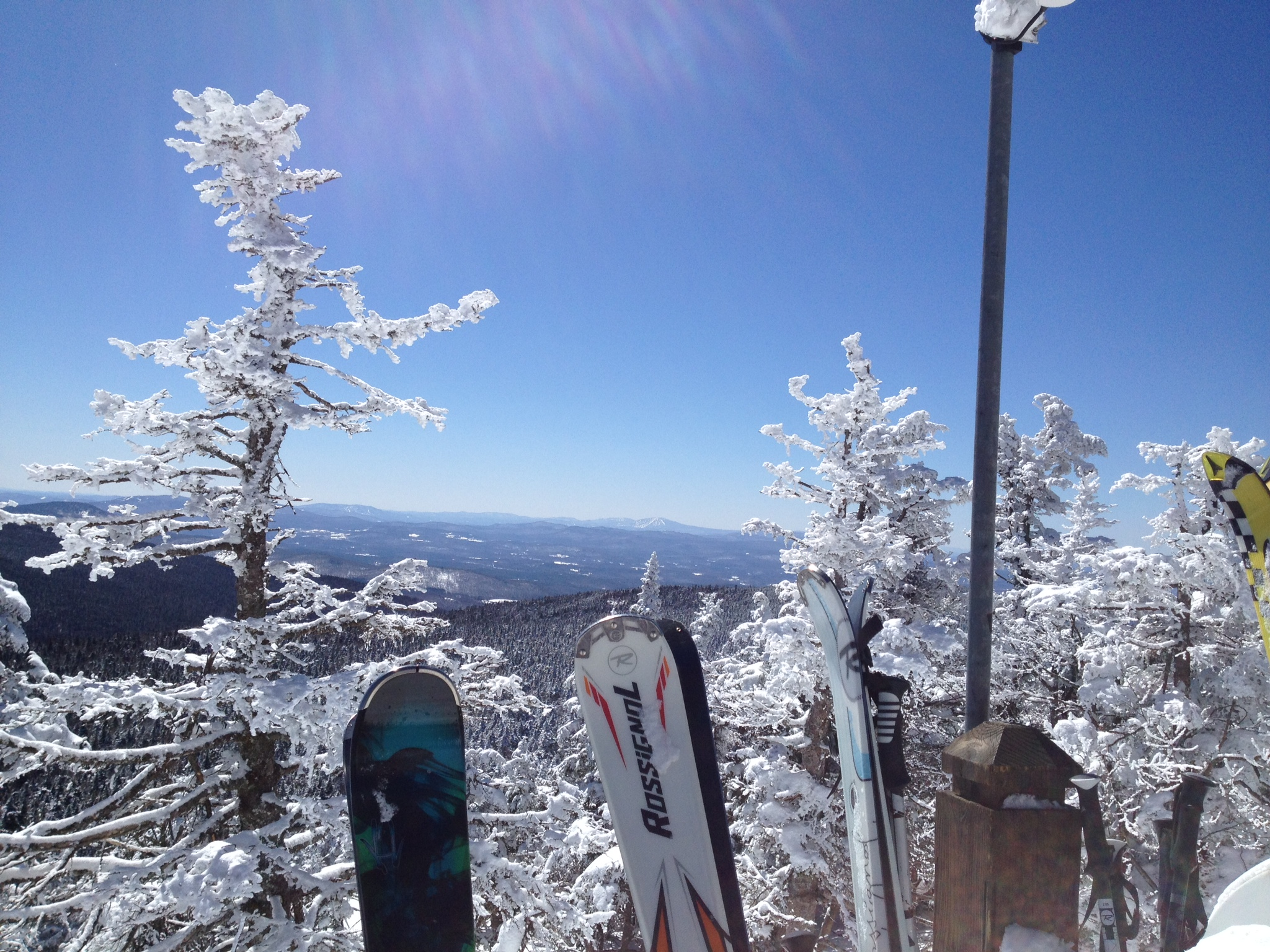
The top of Mount Killington, near where the K1 gondola disembarks

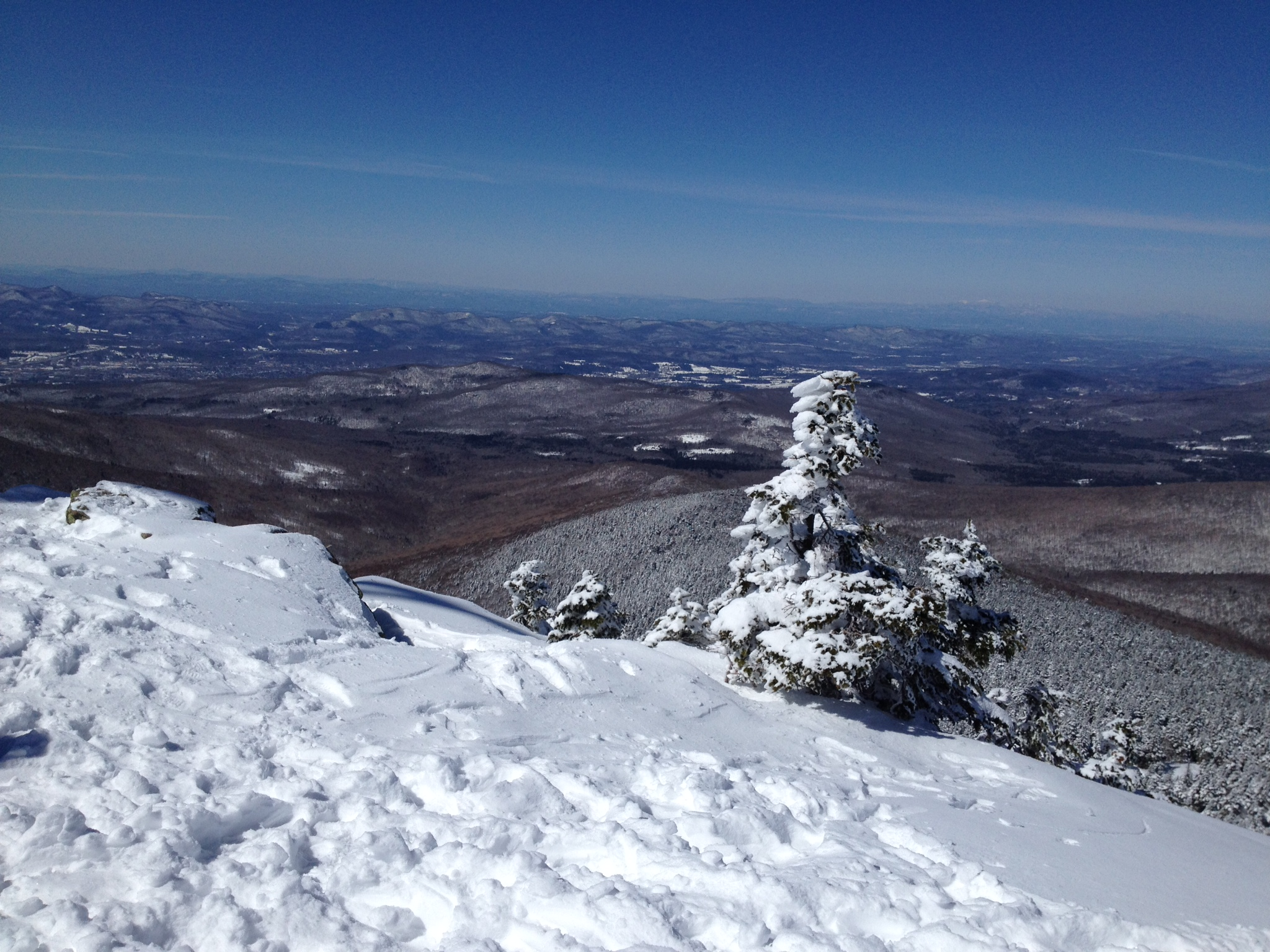
View from the peak of Mount Killington

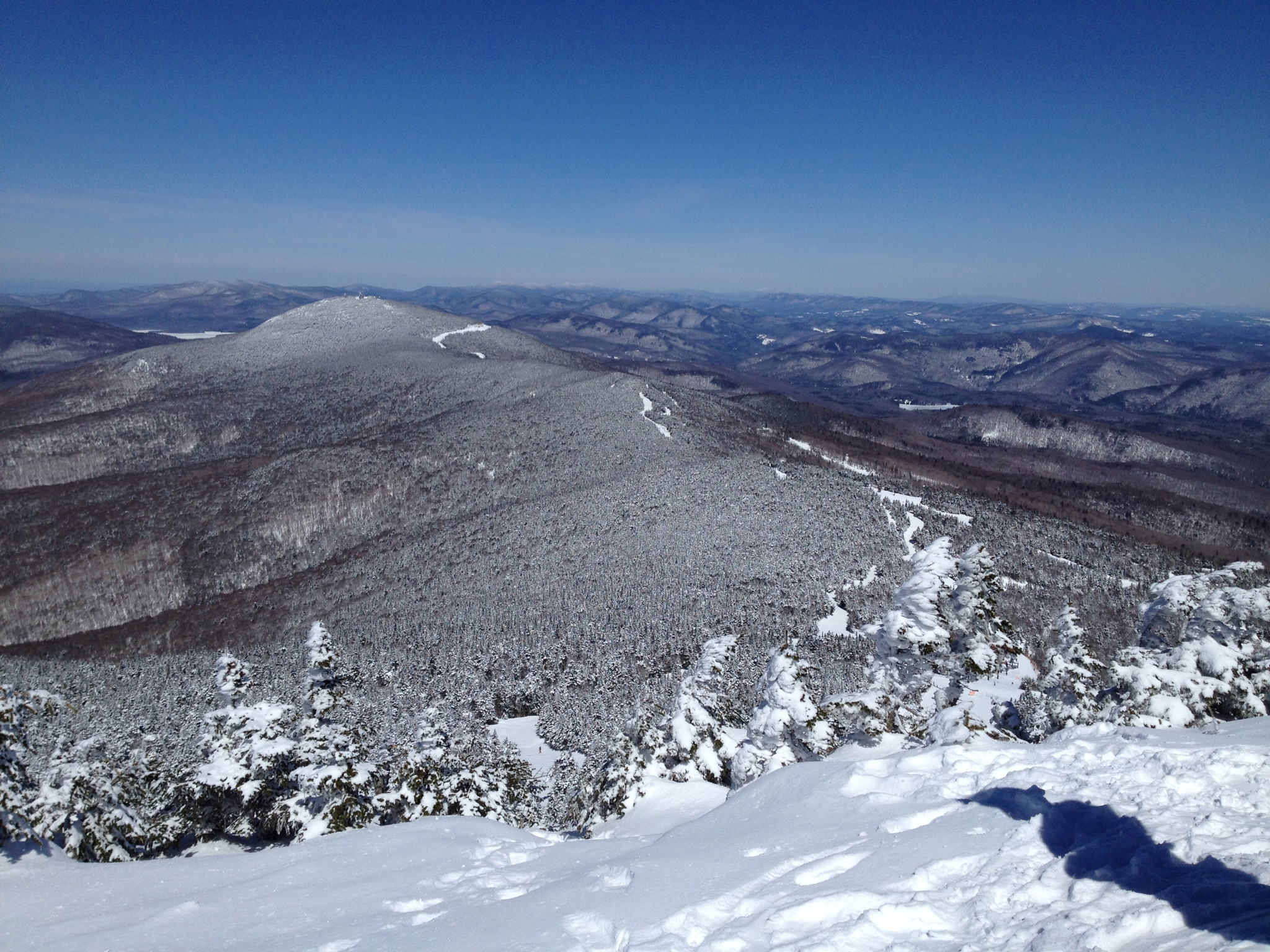
View from the peak of Mount Killington

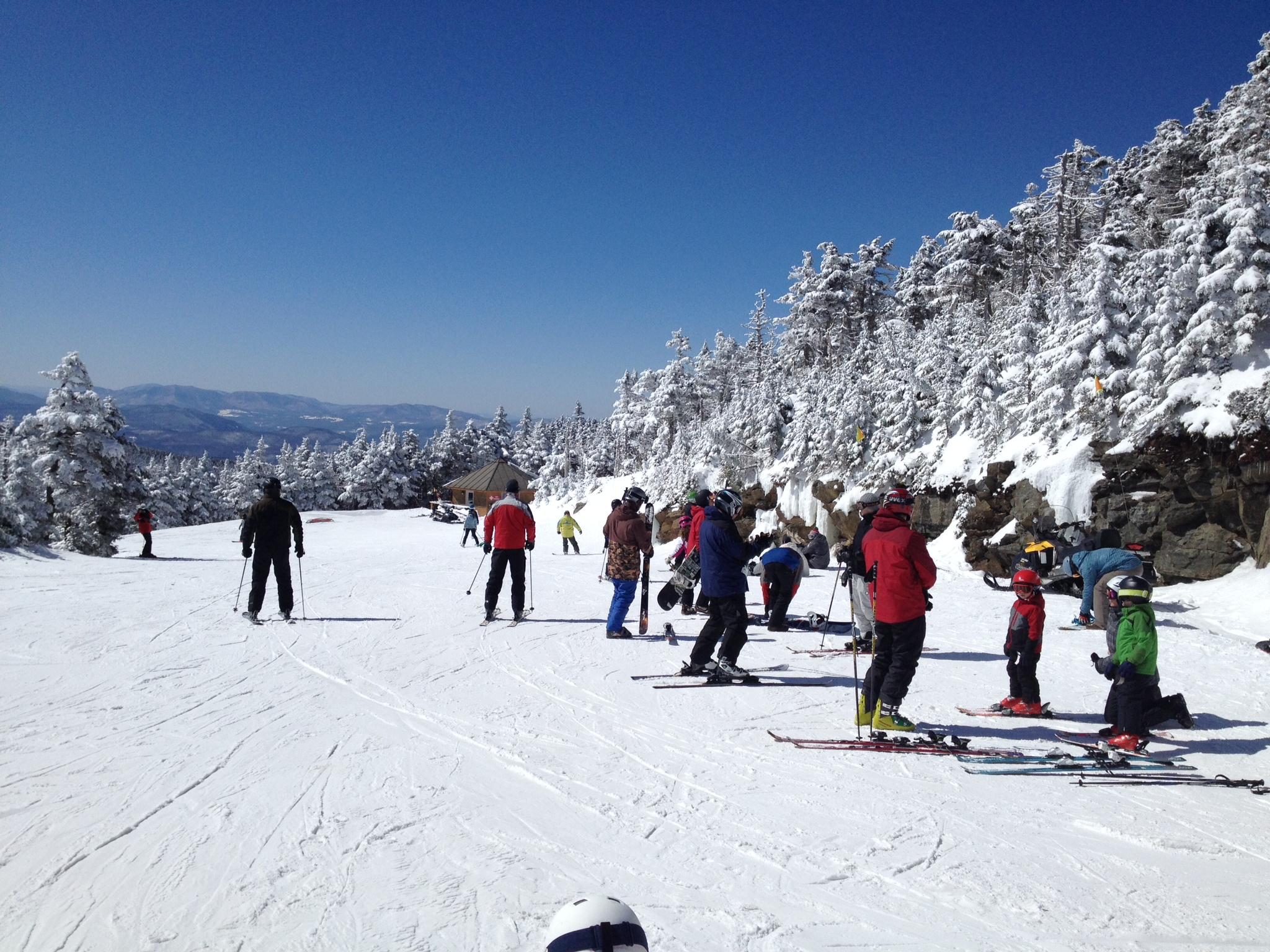
The top of the Great Northern run at Mount Killington

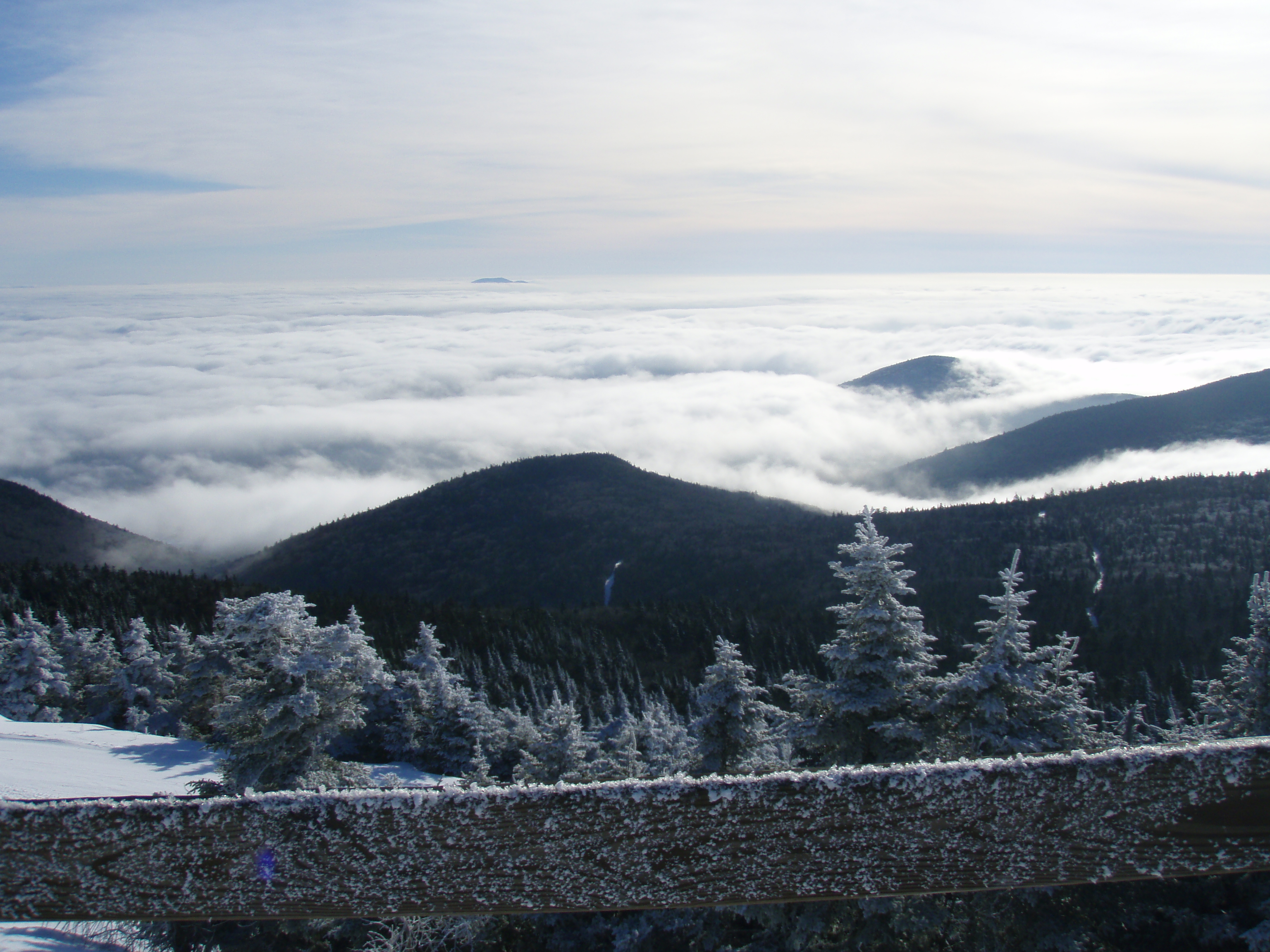
View from the peak of Mount Killington

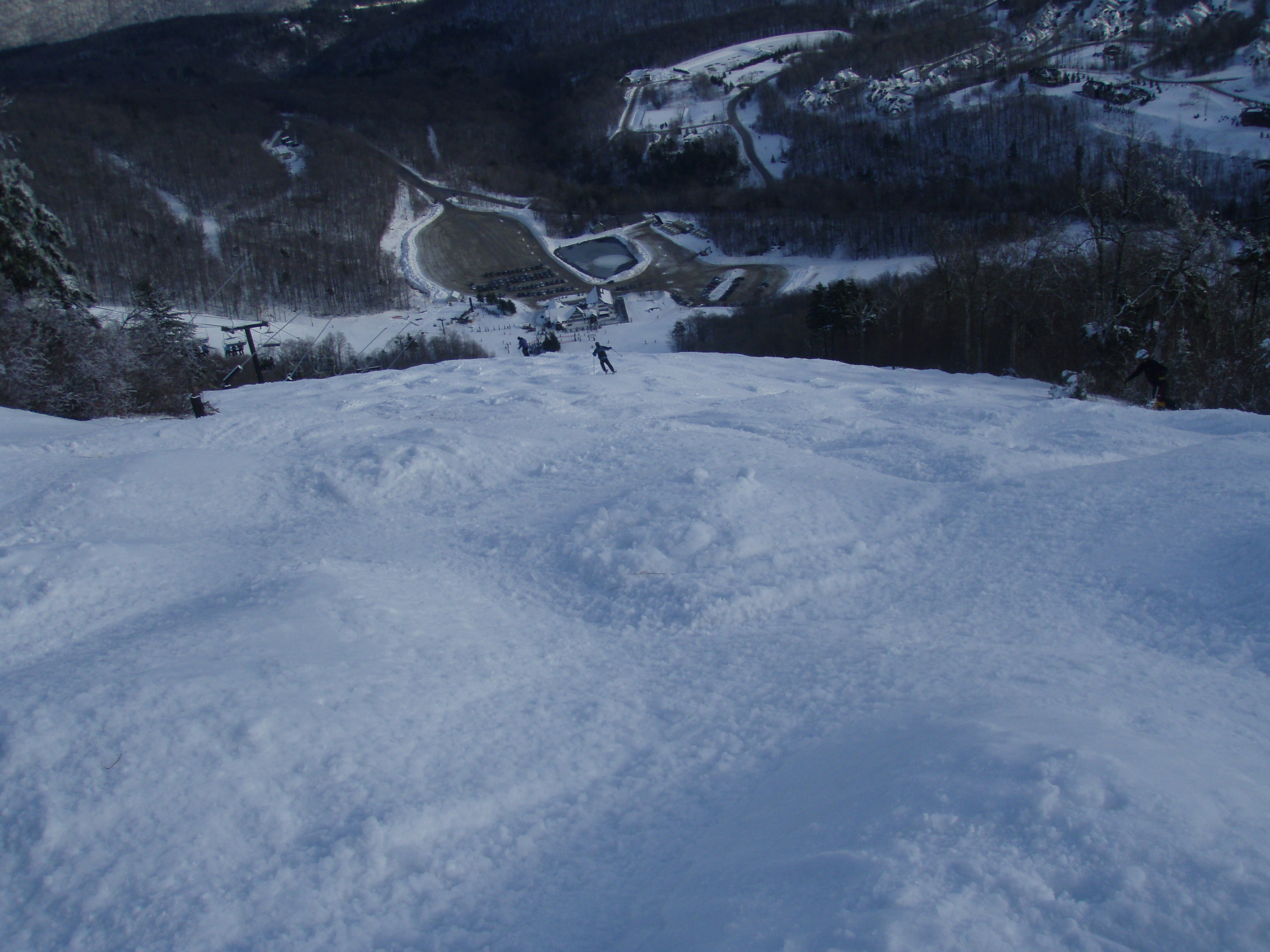
The top of Outer Limits, a double black diamond trail on Bear Mountain

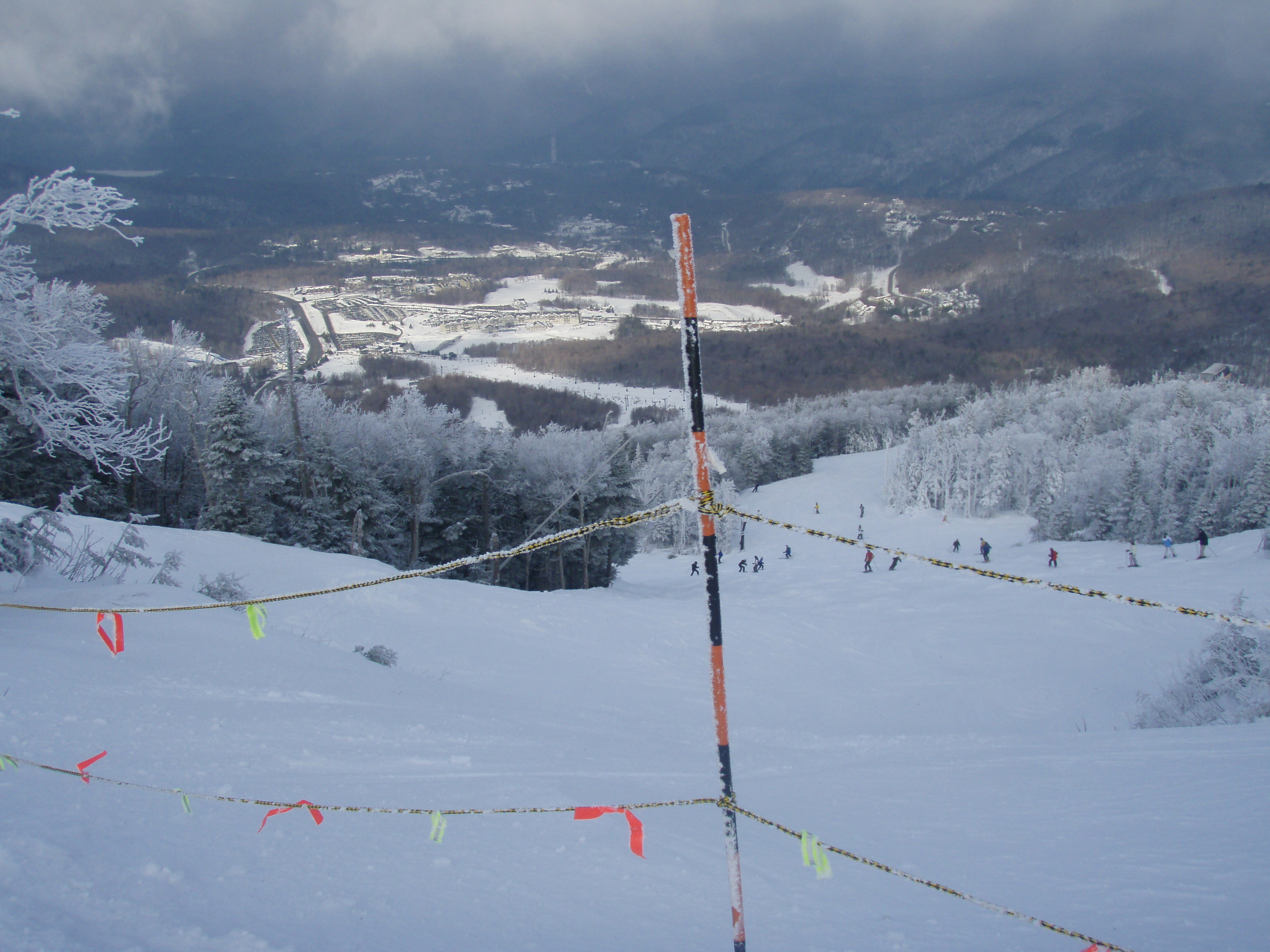
View of East Mountain Road from Skye Peak

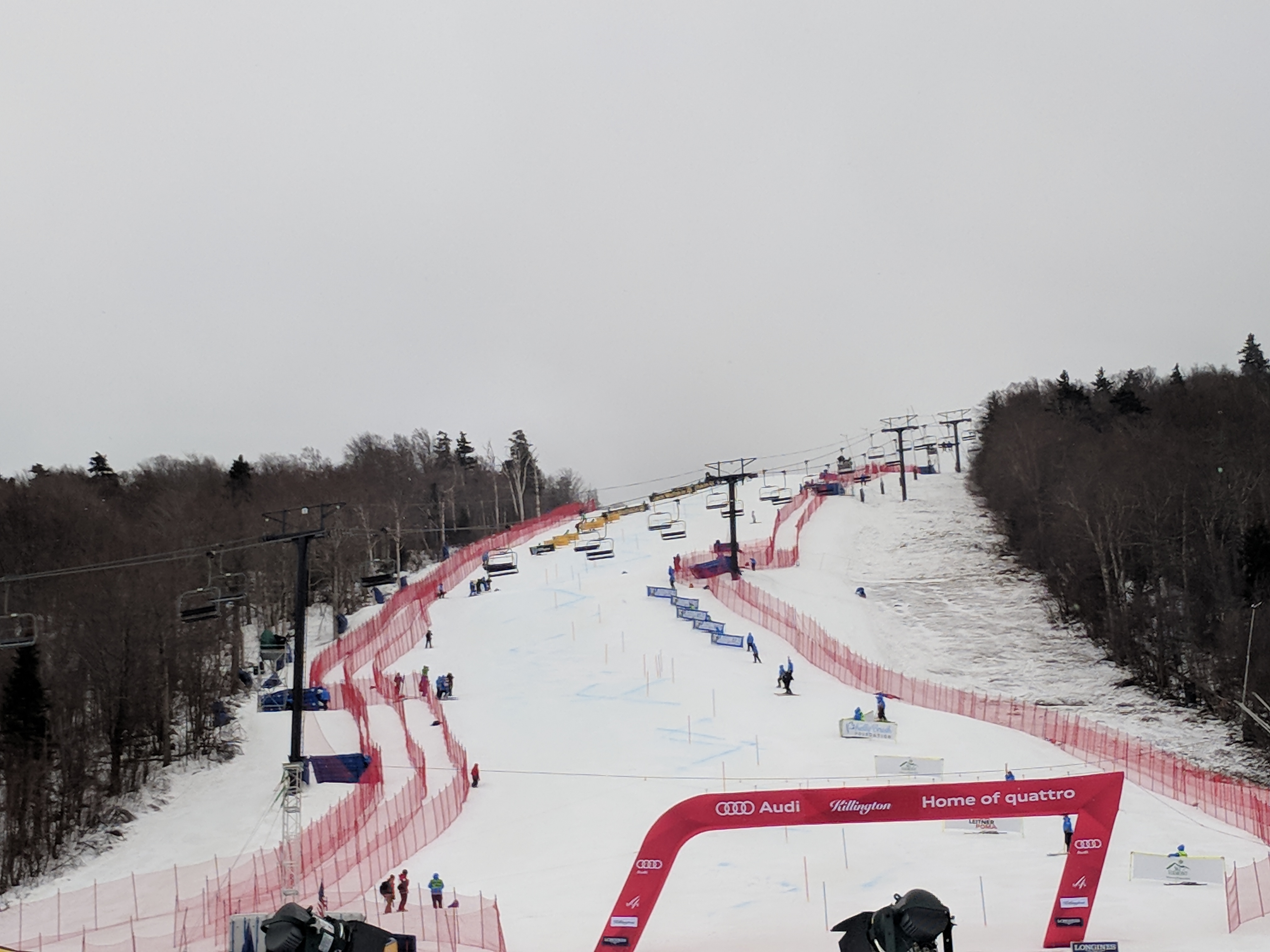
Superstar World Cup Slalom, November 2017
